= Speed skating at the 1972 Winter Olympics – Men's 5000 metres =

Speed skating at the Olympics

Men's 5000 metres at the XI Olympic Winter Games
- Pictogram for speed skating
- Venue: Makomanai Open Stadium
- Dates: 4 February 1972
- Competitors: 28 from 14 nations
- Winning time: 7:23.61

Medalists
1st place, gold medalist(s)		Ard Schenk; Netherlands
2nd place, silver medalist(s)		Roar Grønvold; Norway
3rd place, bronze medalist(s)		Sten Stensen; Norway

The men's 5000 metres in speed skating at the 1972 Winter Olympics took place on 4 February, at the Makomanai Open Stadium.

== Records ==
Prior to this competition, the existing world and Olympic records were as follows:

World record	Ard Schenk (NED)	7:12.0	Inzell, West Germany	13 March 1971
Olympic record	Fred Anton Maier (NOR)	7:22.4	Grenoble, France	15 February 1968

== Results ==
Rank	Athlete	Country	Time
1st place, gold medalist(s)	Ard Schenk	Netherlands	7:23.61
2nd place, silver medalist(s)	Roar Grønvold	Norway	7:28.18
3rd place, bronze medalist(s)	Sten Stensen	Norway	7:33.39
4	Göran Claeson	Sweden	7:36.17
5	Willy Olsen	Norway	7:36.47
6	Kees Verkerk	Netherlands	7:39.17
7	Valery Lavrushkin	Soviet Union	7:39.26
8	Jan Bols	Netherlands	7:39.40
9	Gerd Zimmermann	West Germany	7:41.16
10	Dan Carroll	United States	7:44.72
11	Kimmo Koskinen	Finland	7:45.15
12	Johnny Höglin	Sweden	7:45.68
13	Kiyomi Ito	Japan	7:45.96
14	Örjan Sandler	Sweden	7:47.92
15	Giancarlo Gloder	Italy	7:55.77
16	Osamu Naito	Japan	7:56.97
17	Bruno Toniolli	Italy	7:57.30
18	Jouko Salakka	Finland	7:57.42
19	Kevin Sirois	Canada	8:02.66
20	Charles Gilmore	United States	8:03.04
21	Clark King	United States	8:07.20
22	David Hampton	Great Britain	8:07.85
23	Colin Coates	Australia	8:09.35
24	Richard Tourne	France	8:11.52
25	Andy Barron	Canada	8:11.84
26	John Blewitt	Great Britain	8:16.75
27	Herbert Schwarz	West Germany	8:26.03
28	Luvsansharavyn Tsend	Mongolia	8:30.47
