= Speed skating at the 1972 Winter Olympics – Men's 1500 metres =

Speed skating at the Olympics

Men's 1500 metres at the XI Olympic Winter Games
- Pictogram for speed skating
- Venue: Makomanai Open Stadium
- Dates: 6 February 1972
- Competitors: 39 from 16 nations
- Winning time: 2:02.96

Medalists
1st place, gold medalist(s)		Ard Schenk	Netherlands
2nd place, silver medalist(s)		Roar Grønvold	Norway
3rd place, bronze medalist(s)		Göran Claeson	Sweden

The men's 1500 metres in speed skating at the 1972 Winter Olympics took place on 6 February, at the Makomanai Open Stadium.

== Records ==
Prior to this competition, the existing world and Olympic records were as follows:

World record	Ard Schenk (NED)	1:58.7	Davos, Switzerland	16 January 1971
Olympic record	Kees Verkerk (NED)	2:03.4	Grenoble, France	19 February 1968

The following new Olympic record was set.

Date	Pair	Athlete	Country	Time	OR	WR
6 February	Pair 8	Ard Schenk	Netherlands	2:02.96	OR	

== Results ==
Rank	Athlete	Country	Time	Notes
1st place, gold medalist(s)	Ard Schenk	Netherlands	2:02.96	OR
2nd place, silver medalist(s)	Roar Grønvold	Norway	2:04.26	
3rd place, bronze medalist(s)	Göran Claeson	Sweden	2:05.89	
4	Bjørn Tveter	Norway	2:05.94	
5	Jan Bols	Netherlands	2:06.58	
6	Valery Lavrushkin	Soviet Union	2:07.16	
7	Dan Carroll	United States	2:07.24	
8	Kees Verkerk	Netherlands	2:07.43	
9	Johnny Höglin	Sweden	2:08.11	
10	Kimmo Koskinen	Finland	2:08.18	
11	Svein-Erik Stiansen	Norway	2:08.63	
12	Gerd Zimmermann	West Germany	2:08.95	
13	Dag Fornæss	Norway	2:09.52	
14	Gary Jonland	United States	2:09.55	
15	Göran Johansson	Sweden	2:09.66	
16	Johan Granath	Sweden	2:10.21	
17	Jouko Salakka	Finland	2:10.22	
18	Bruno Toniolli	Italy	2:10.24	
19	Eddy Verheijen	Netherlands	2:10.96	
20	Mutsuhiko Maeda	Japan	2:11.09	
21	Valery Muratov	Soviet Union	2:11.83	
22	Kiyomi Ito	Japan	2:11.96	
23	Bob Hodges	Canada	2:12.13	
24	Colin Coates	Australia	2:12.14	
25	Bill Lanigan	United States	2:12.31	
26	Kevin Sirois	Canada	2:13.99	
27	Giancarlo Gloder	Italy	2:14.07	
28	Seppo Hänninen	Finland	2:14.52	
29	David Hampton	Great Britain	2:14.60	
30	Clark King	United States	2:14.83	
31	Otmar Braunecker	Austria	2:14.88	
32	Herbert Schwarz	West Germany	2:15.42	
33	Richard Tourne	France	2:16.37	
34	Leo Linkovesi	Finland	2:16.86	
35	Jeong Chung-Gu	South Korea	2:17.36	
36	Andy Barron	Canada	2:17.71	
37	John Blewitt	Great Britain	2:18.96	
38	Luvsanlkhagvyn Dashnyam	Mongolia	2:20.42	
39	Jim Lynch	Australia	2:26.69	
