= Speed skating at the 1972 Winter Olympics – Men's 10,000 metres =

Speed skating at the Olympics

Men's 10,000 metres at the XI Olympic Winter Games
- Pictogram for speed skating
- Venue: Makomanai Open Stadium
- Dates: 7 February 1972
- Competitors: 24 from 14 nations
- Winning time: 15:01.35 OR

Medalists
1st place, gold medalist(s)		Ard Schenk; Netherlands
2nd place, silver medalist(s)		Kees Verkerk; Netherlands
3rd place, bronze medalist(s)		Sten Stensen; Norway

The men's 10,000 metres in speed skating at the 1972 Winter Olympics took place on 7 February, at the Makomanai Open Stadium.

== Records ==
Prior to this competition, the existing world and Olympic records were as follows:

World record	Ard Schenk (NED)	14:55.9	Inzell, West Germany	14 March 1971
Olympic record	Johnny Höglin (SWE)	15:23.6	Grenoble, France	17 February 1968

The following new World and Olympic records was set during the competition.

Date	Pair	Athlete	Country	Time	OR	WR
7 February	Pair 2	Sten Stensen	Norway	15:07.08	OR	
7 February	Pair 8	Kees Verkerk	Netherlands	15:04.70	OR	
7 February	Pair 12	Ard Schenk	Netherlands	15:01.35	OR	

== Results ==
Rank	Athlete	Country	Time	Notes
1st place, gold medalist(s)	Ard Schenk	Netherlands	15:01.35	OR
2nd place, silver medalist(s)	Kees Verkerk	Netherlands	15:04.70	
3rd place, bronze medalist(s)	Sten Stensen	Norway	15:07.08	
4	Jan Bols	Netherlands	15:17.99	
5	Valery Lavrushkin	Soviet Union	15:20.08	
6	Göran Claeson	Sweden	15:30.19	
7	Kimmo Koskinen	Finland	15:38.87	
8	Gerd Zimmermann	West Germany	15:43.92	
9	Dan Carroll	United States	15:44.41	
10	Kiyomi Ito	Japan	15:48.17	
11	Per Willy Guttormsen	Norway	15:48.71	
12	Osamu Naito	Japan	15:52.93	
13	Dag Fornæss	Norway	15:53.33	
14	Kevin Sirois	Canada	15:58.61	
15	Örjan Sandler	Sweden	16:04.90	
16	Bruno Toniolli	Italy	16:14.52	
17	Giancarlo Gloder	Italy	16:21.42	
18	Colin Coates	Australia	16:29.94	
19	Jouko Salakka	Finland	16:35.64	
20	David Hampton	Great Britain	16:39.01	
21	Clark King	United States	16:39.82	
22	Richard Tourne	France	16:48.70	
23	John Blewitt	Great Britain	16:51.50	
24	Luvsansharavyn Tsend	Mongolia	17:15.34	
