= 1972 World Allround Speed Skating Championships =

International speed skating competition

1972 World Allround Speed Skating Championships for Men
- Venue: Bislett stadion, Oslo, Norway
- Dates: 19–20 February
- Competitors: 31 skaters from 13 countries

Medalist men
1st place, gold medalist(s)		Ard Schenk	NED
2nd place, silver medalist(s)		Roar Grønvold	NOR
3rd place, bronze medalist(s)		Jan Bols	NED

The World Allround Speed Skating Championships for Men took place on 19 and 20 February 1972 in Oslo at the Bislett stadion ice rink.

The title holder and winner was Ard Schenk who prolonged his title to become the third speed skater to win the world allround title three times in a row, equaling the performances of Oscar Mathisen and Hjalmar Andersen.

== Classification ==
Rank	Skater	Country	Points Samalog	500m	5000m	1500m	10,000m
1st place, gold medalist(s)	Ard Schenk	Netherlands	171.549	40.14 (gold)	7:22.84 (gold)	2:03.06 (gold)	15:22.09 (gold)
2nd place, silver medalist(s)	Roar Grønvold	Norway	174.306	40.14 (gold)	7:30.76 (5)	2:04.40 (2)	15:52.45 (7)
3rd place, bronze medalist(s)	Jan Bols	Netherlands	174.493	41.01 (9)	7:29.97 (2)	2:06.48 (7)	15:26.52 (2)
4	Sten Stensen	Norway	175.028	41.37 (13)	7:30.39 (4)	2:05.95 (4)	15:32.72(3)
5	Eddy Verheijen	Netherlands	175.446	41.64 (14)	7:30.32 (3)	2:05.78 (3)	15:36.94 (14)
6	Kees Verkerk	Netherlands	177.175	42.25 (20)	7:31.44 (6)	2:07.74 (9)	15:44.01 (5)
7	Göran Claeson	Sweden	177.339	41.04 (10)	7:40.17 (10)	2:07.38 (8)	15:56.43 (10)
8	Valery Lavrushkin	Soviet Union	177.506	40.50 (4)	7:36.24 (8)	2:09.18 15)	16:06.43 (13)
9	Kimmo Koskinen	Finland	177.802	40.70 (7)	7:45.60 (15)	2:06.23 (5)	16:09.29 (14)
10	Bjørn Tveter	Norway	177.882	40.72 (8)	7:44.11 (14)	2:06.30 (6)	16:13.02 (15)
11	Vladimir Ivanov	Soviet Union	178.233	41.81 (15)	7:39.50 (9)	2:08.22 (10)	15:54.65 (9)
12	Willy Olsen	Norway	178.962	42.06 (17)	7:35.41 (7)	2:09.13 (14)	16:06.36 (12)
13	Per Willy Guttormsen	Norway	179.398	42.41 (22)	7:43.12 (12)	2:09.58 (17)	15:49.65 (6)
14	Jappie van Dijk	Netherlands	179.477	42.64 (23)	7:42.04 (11)	2:09.01 (12)	15:52.59 (8)
15	Dan Carroll	United States	179.509	40.66 (6)	7:46.80 (16)	2:09.34 (16)	16:21.11 (16)
16	Aleksandr Tsjekoelajev	Soviet Union	179.699	42.12 (19)	7:43.67 (13)	2:09.60 (18)	16:00.24 (11)
NC17	Johnny Höglin	Sweden	130.643	40.51 (5)	7:51.16 (17)	2:09.05 (13)	–
NC18	Gary Jonland	United States	131.870	41.09 (11)	7:58.17 (19)	2:08.89 (11)	–
NC19	Göran Johansson	Sweden	133.079	41.11 (12)	8:02.86 (21)	2:11.05 (19)	–
NC20	Kiyomi Ito	Japan	134.374	42.73 (24)	7:55.81 (18)	2:12.19 (20)	–
NC21	David Hampton	United Kingdom	134.891	41.83 (16)	8:04.61 (22)	2:13.80 (23)	–
NC22	Jouko Salakka	Finland	135.442	42.11 (18)	8:07.72 (23)	2:13.68 (21)	–
NC23	Colin Coates	Australia	136.319	42.97 (25)	8:07.86 (24)	2:13.69 (23)	–
NC24	Franz Krienbühl	Switzerland	137.156	44.68 (31)	7:58.66 (20)	2:13.83 (24)	–
NC25	Örjan Sandler	Sweden	137.648	44.11 (30)	8:08.25 (25)	2:14.14 (25)	–
NC26	Zhao Weichang	China	138.051	42.30 (21)	8:23.21 (29)	2:16.29 (29)	–
NC27	Richard Tourne	France	138.193	43.00 (26)	8:20.03 (28)	2:15.57 (28)	–
NC28	Helmut Kraus	West Germany	138.753	43.22 (28)	8:26.33 (30)	2:14.70 (26)	–
NC29	John Blewitt	United Kingdom	139.404	44.76 (32)	8:09.57 (26)	2:17.06 (30)	–
NC30	Anton Eicher	West Germany	139.751	43.54 (29)	8:31.14 (31)	2:15.29 (27)	–
NC31	Kuangchun Chin	China	141.066	44.85 (33)	8:15.16 (27)	2:20.10 (31)	–
NC32	Jim Lynch	Australia	148.133	43.21 (27)	9:48.33 (32)	2:24.27 (32)	–
NC	Takayuki Hida	Japan	40.180	44.85 (34)	DNS	–	–

:  DNS = Did not start

== Attribution ==
In Dutch
