= 1971 World Allround Speed Skating Championships =

Men's speed skating championship

1971 World Allround Speed Skating Championships for Men
- Venue: Ullevi, Gothenburg, Sweden
- Dates: 13 – 14 February
- Competitors: 34 skaters from 14 countries

Medalist men
1st place, gold medalist(s)		Ard Schenk	NED
2nd place, silver medalist(s)		Göran Claeson	SWE
3rd place, bronze medalist(s)		Kees Verkerk	NED

The World Allround Speed Skating Championships for Men took place on 13 and 14 February 1971 in Gothenburg at the Ullevi ice rink.

Title holder was the Netherlander Ard Schenk.

== Result ==
Rank	Skater	Country	Points Samalog	500m	5000m	1500m	10,000m
1st place, gold medalist(s)	Ard Schenk	Netherlands	171.130 WR	40.57 (3)	7:18.8 (gold)	2:04.8 (gold)	15:01.6 WR (gold)
2nd place, silver medalist(s)	Göran Claeson	Sweden	173.368	40.46 (2)	7:22.4 (3)	2:08.2 (4)	15:18.7 (4)
3rd place, bronze medalist(s)	Kees Verkerk	Netherlands	174.958	42.08 (12)	7:20.6 (2)	2:09.4 (10)	15:13.7 (2)
4	Dag Fornæss	Norway	175.707	40.31 (gold)	7:29.0 (7)	2:07.7 (3)	15:58.6 (10)
5	Sten Stensen	Norway	177.102	43.79 (28)	7:26.5 (5)	2:08.3 (5)	15:17.9 (3)
6	Jan Bols	Netherlands	177.128	41.78 (7)	7:26.4 (4)	2:08.5 (6)	15:57.5 (9)
7	Eddy Verheijen	Netherlands	177.762	42.09 (13)	7:29.7 (8)	2:08.9 (8)	15:54.7 (6)
8	Per Willy Guttormsen	Norway	178.405	42.49 (17)	7:28.5 (6)	2:09.9 (11)	15:55.3 (8)
9	Aleksandr Tsjekoelajev	Soviet Union	178.745	41.89 (10)	7:30.6 (9)	2:11.4 (18)	15:59.9 (11)
10	Gerhard Zimmermann	West Germany	179.193	42.59 (19)	7:36.0 (12)	2:10.0 (12)	15:53.4 (5)
11	Johnny Höglin	Sweden	179.360	41.38 (5)	7:37.5 (14)	2:10.2 (13)	16:16.6 (15)
12	Willy Olsen	Norway	180.132	42.45 (16)	7:34.7 (11)	2:13.4 (21)	15:54.9 (7)
13	Örjan Sandler	Sweden	180.807	42.61 (21)	7:37.6 (16)	2:11.0 (15)	16:08.4 (13)
14	Raimo Hietala	Finland	180.973	42.69 (22)	7:34.3 (10)	2:13.3 (20)	16:08.4 (13)
15	Osamu Naito	Japan	181.293	43.96 (29)	7:36.7 (13)	2:10.3 (14)	16:04.6 (12)
16	Giovanni Gloder	Italy	183.958	43.14 (26)	7:37.5 (14)	2:14.5 (27)	16:44.7 (16)
NC17	Magne Thomassen	Norway	130.753	41.84 (9)	7:39.8 (18)	2:08.8 (7)	–
NC18	Göran Johansson	Sweden	131.130	42.34 (14)	7:42.9 (20)	2:07.5 (2)	–
NC19	Peter Nottet	Netherlands	131.247	41.36 (4)	7:39.2 (17)	2:11.9 (19)	–
NC20	Bruno Toniolli	Italy	131.547	42.36 (15)	7:41.2 (19)	2:09.2 (9)	–
NC21	Kimmo Koskinen	Finland	132.710	41.81 (8)	7:44.0 (21)	2:13.5 (22)	–
NC22	Jouko Salakka	Finland	133.923	42.53 (18)	7:46.6 (22)	2:14.2 (23)	–
NC23	Bill Lanigan	United States	134.803	42.59 (19)	7:54.8 (25)	2:14.2 (23)	–
NC24	Vladislav Matvejev	Soviet Union	134.960	43.06 (25)	8:02.0 (26)	2:11.1 (11)	–
NC25	Shigeki Kobayashi	Japan	135.287	43.59 (27)	7:49.3 (23)	2:14.3 (25)	–
NC26	David Hampton	United Kingdom	136.717	43.00 (24)	8:04.5 (27)	2:15.8 (29)	–
NC27	Dan Carroll	United States	136.773	41.73 (6)	8:33.1 * (33)	2:11.2 (17)	–
NC28	Franz Krienbühl	Switzerland	137.173	44.45 (33)	7:50.9 (24)	2:16.9 (32)	–
NC29	Kevin Sirois	Canada	137.463	43.98 (30)	8:04.5 (27)	2:15.1 (28)	–
NC30	Helmut Kraus	West Germany	138.007	42.94 (23)	8:23.0 (32)	2:14.3 (25)	–
NC31	Siegfried Hartmann	Austria	139.020	44.12 (32)	8:16.0 (31)	2:15.9 (30)	–
NC32	Richard Tourne	France	139.097	44.47 (34)	8:10.6 (29)	8:10.6 (31)	–
NC33	Bob Hodges	Canada	139.230	44.06 (31)	8:12.7 (30)	2:17.7 (33)	–
NC	Otmar Braunecker	Austria	–	41.89 (10)	DNS	–	–

DNS = Did not start
* = Fell

== Attribution ==
In Dutch
