= 1970 World Allround Speed Skating Championships =

International speed skating competition

1970 World Allround Speed Skating Championships for Men
- Venue: Bislett Stadium, Oslo, Norway
- Dates: 14–15 February
- Competitors: 33 skaters

Medalist men
1st place, gold medalist(s)		Ard Schenk	NED
2nd place, silver medalist(s)		Magne Thomassen	NOR
3rd place, bronze medalist(s)		Kees Verkerk	NED

The World Allround Speed Skating Championships for Men took place on 14 and 15 February 1970 in Oslo at the Bislett Stadium ice rink.

Title holder was the Norwegian Dag Fornæss.

== Result ==
Rank	Skater	Country	Points Samalog	500m	5000m	1500m	10,000m
1st place, gold medalist(s)	Ard Schenk	Netherlands	173.487	40.30 (3)	7:30.7 (3)	2:04.4 (gold)	15:33.0 (4)
2nd place, silver medalist(s)	Magne Thomassen	Norway	173.893	40.15 (gold)	7:33.5 (4)	2:06.1 (3)	15:27.2 (2)
3rd place, bronze medalist(s)	Kees Verkerk	Netherlands	174.433	41.57 (10)	7:29.0 (2)	2:04.6 (2)	15:28.6 (3)
4	Jan Bols	Netherlands	175.470	41.78 (14)	7:28.6 (gold)	2:08.1 (9)	15:22.6 (gold)
5	Dag Fornæss	Norway	175.717	40.87 (6)	7:38.2 (7)	2:06.2 (4)	15:39.2 (6)
6	Göran Claeson	Sweden	176.697	40.78 (5)	7:39.8 (11)	2:06.2 (5)	15:57.4 (13)
7	Sten Stensen	Norway	177.038	41.62 (12)	7:37.4 (6)	2:07.0 (6)	15:46.9 (8)
8	Bjørn Tveter	Norway	177.278	41.17 (8)	7:36.9 (15)	2:08.2 (10)	15:53.7 (10)
9	Eddy Verheijen	Netherlands	177.430	42.24 (18)	7:39.0 (8)	2:07.5 (7)	15:35.8 (5)
10	Bård Henriksen	Norway	177.827	41.62 (12)	7:39.4 (9)	2:08.6 (11)	15:48.0 (9)
11	Johnny Höglin	Sweden	178.382	41.12 (7)	7:42.8 (14)	2:08.0 (8)	16:06.3 (16)
12	Kimmo Koskinen	Finland	178.922	42.28 (19)	7:39.5 (10)	2:10.1 (14)	15:46.5 (7 )
13	Gerhard Zimmermann	West Germany	179.283	42.07 (17)	7:40.9 (13)	2:09.4 (13)	15:59.8 (14)
14	Valery Lavrushkin	Soviet Union	179.780	42.43 (21)	7:44.0 (16)	2:09.3 (12)	15:57.0 (12)
15	Joeri Joemasjev	Soviet Union	181.025	42.56 (22)	7:43.7 (15)	2:11.7 (16)	16:03.9 (15)
16	Jappie van Dijk	Netherlands	181.313	43.28 (26)	7:40.7 (12)	2:12.4 (17)	15:56.6 (11)
NC17	Göran Johansson	Sweden	133.197	41.86 (15)	7:57.7 (18)	2:10.7 (15)	–
NC18	Bill Lanigan	United States	133.460	41.60 (11)	7:54.6 (19)	2:13.2 (20)	–
NC19	Dan Carroll	United States	134.463	41.48 (9)	8:04.5 (23)	2:13.6 (21)	–
NC20	Örjan Sandler	Sweden	135.157	42.88 (25)	7:59.1 (20)	2:13.1 (19)	–
NC21	Mutsuhiko Maeda	Japan	135.293	41.87 (16)	8:06.9 (24)	2:14.2 (23)	–
NC22	Claes Lavås	Sweden	136.573	42.86 (24)	8:09.8 (25)	2:14.2 (23)	–
NC23	Seppo Hänninen	Finland	137.317	40.64 (4)	8:36.1 (30)	2:15.2 (25)	–
NC24	Bob Hodges	Canada	137.343	42.81 (23)	8:11.0 (26)	2:16.3 (27)	–
NC25	Erhard Keller	West Germany	138.697	40.26 (2)	8:57.7 (33)	2:14.0 (22)	–
NC26	Franz Krienbühl	Switzerland	139.213	44.66 (30)	8:02.2 (22)	2:19.0 (32)	–
NC27	Richard Tourne	France	139.980	44.24 (28)	8:14.4 (17)	2:18.9 (31)	–
NC28	Kevin Sirois	Canada	140.207	44.40 (29)	8:16.4 (28)	2:18.5 (29)	–
NC29	John Blewitt	United Kingdom	140.610	44.12 (27)	8:22.9 (29)	2:18.6 (33)	–
NC30	Giorgio Torgler	Italy	141.657	42.32 (20)	8:55.7 (32)	2:17.3 (28)	–
NC31	Raimo Hietala	Finland	145.300	53.15* (31)	7:58.5 (19)	2:12.9 (18)	–
NC32	Bruno Toniolli	Italy	148.320	54.82* (32)	8:01.0 (21)	2:16.2 (26)	–
NC33	Keiichi Suzuki	Japan	154.827	54.82* (32)	8:55.4 (31)	2:19.4 (33)	–

* = Fell
