= 1973 World Allround Speed Skating Championships =

International speed skating competition

1973 World Allround Speed Skating Championships for Men
- Venue: IJsselstadion, Deventer, Netherlands
- Dates: 17–18 February
- Competitors: 39 skaters from 17 nations

Medalist men
1st place, gold medalist(s)		Göran Claeson	SWE
2nd place, silver medalist(s)		Sten Stensen	NOR
3rd place, bronze medalist(s)		Piet Kleine	NED

The World Allround Speed Skating Championships for Men took place on 17 and 18 February 1973 in Deventer at the IJsselstadion ice rink.

== Classification ==
Rank	Skater	Country	Points Samalog	500m	5000m	1500m	10,000m
1st place, gold medalist(s)	Göran Claeson	Sweden	181.259	42.10 (2)	7:47.03 (gold)	2:15.47 (6)	15:45.98 (gold)
2nd place, silver medalist(s)	Sten Stensen	Norway	181.343	42.98 (7)	7:47.30 (2)	2:12.70 (gold)	15:48.00 (2)
3rd place, bronze medalist(s)	Piet Kleine	Netherlands	181.869	43.04 (8)	7:50.69 (4)	2:13.00 (2)	15:48.53 (3)
4	Harm Kuipers	Netherlands	183.529	43.27 (10)	7:53.10 (6)	2:14.69 (5)	16:01.04 (5)
5	Vladimir Ivanov	Soviet Union	183.789	42.93 (6)	7:49.76 (3)	2:15.86 (10)	16:11.92 (8)
6	Jappie van Dijk	Netherlands	184.563	43.55 (13)	7:55.21 (7)	2:15.48 (7)	16:06.63 (7)
7	Hans van Helden	Netherlands	184.655	43.99 (25)	7:51.88 (5)	2:15.89 (11)	16:03.60 (6)
8	Jan Egil Storholt	Norway	184.772	42.61 (5)	8:11.59 (16)	2:13.15 (3)	16:12.39 (9)
9	Jan Derksen	Netherlands	185.764	44.73 (34)	7:55.43 (8)	2:16.48 (13)	15:59.96 (4)
10	Erik Vea	Norway	186.530	43.48 (12)	8:02.49 (10)	2:17.06 (16)	16:22.27 (12)
11	Yuri Kondakov	Soviet Union	186.977	43.74 (18)	8:01.74 (9)	2:18.44 (22)	16:18.31 (11)
12	Ingar Bollerud	Norway	187.292	44.21 (28)	8:03.35 (12)	2:17.66 (19)	16:17.19 (10)
13	Colin Coates	Australia	188.234	43.23 (9)	8:04.86 (13)	2:20.55 (30)	16:33.36 (15)
14	Sergey Marchuk	Soviet Union	188.410	43.66 (15)	8:07.10 (14)	2:19.25 (28)	16:32.45 (14)
15	Bo Fransson	Sweden	188.470	43.96 (24)	8:02.49 (10)	2:20.95 (31)	16:25.55 (13)
16	Shigeki Kobayashi	Japan	188.755	43.56 (14)	8:11.28 (15)	2:18.20 (21)	16:40.00 (16)
NC17	Gary Jonland	United States	137.269	42.23 (4)	8:13.32 (18)	2:17.12 (17)	–
NC18	Bill Lanigan	United States	138.493	42.00 (gold)	8:39.26 (33)	2:13.70 (4)	–
NC19	Jouko Salakka	Finland	138.922	43.70 (16)	8:20.59 (25)	2:15.49 (8)	–
NC20	Zhao Weichang	China	138.994	43.27 (10)	8:23.71 (27)	2:16.06 (12)	–
NC21	Dagfinn Hagen	Norway	139.096	44.01 (26)	8:13.03 (17)	2:17.35 (18)	–
NC22	Krzysztof Ferens	Poland	140.384	44.25 (29)	8:18.27 (23)	2:18.92 (25)	–
NC23	Bruno Toniolli	Italy	140.432	44.31 (31)	8:18.89 (24)	2:18.70 (24)	–
NC24	Peter Lake	United Kingdom	140.437	44.14 (27)	8:17.77 (22)	2:19.56 (29)	–
NC25	Franz Krienbühl	Switzerland	140.914	45.17 (36)	8:13.87 (19)	2:19.07 (26)	–
NC26	Masaki Suzuki	Japan	141.171	42.17 (3)	8:54.81 (38)	2:16.56 (15)	–
NC27	Dan Johansson	Sweden	141.247	45.68 (38)	8:23.30 (26)	2:15.71 (9)	–
NC28	Raimo Hietala	Finland	141.270	43.90 (21)	8:17.37 (20)	2:22.90 (37)	–
NC29	Helmut Kraus	West Germany	141.572	43.75 (19)	8:38.45 (32)	2:17.93 (20)	–
NC30	Giovanni Gloder	Italy	141.641	44.25 (29)	8:17.64 (21)	2:22.88 (36)	–
NC31	Valery Lavrushkin	Soviet Union	142.064	43.93 (23)	8:46.17 (36)	2:16.55 (14)	–
NC32	Gerard Cassan	Canada	142.248	43.84 (20)	8:31.18 (28)	2:21.87 (35)	–
NC33	Yang Shaohua	China	142.435	43.73 (17)	8:45.02 (35)	2:18.61 (23)	–
NC34	Jerzy Liebchen	Poland	142.898	43.90 (21)	8:46.25 (37)	2:19.12 (27)	–
NC35	John Cassidy	Canada	143.317	44.59 (33)	8:34.90 (30)	2:21.71 (33)	–
NC36	Herbert Schwarz	West Germany	143.678	44.41 (32)	8:40.45 (34)	2:21.67 (32)	–
NC37	Gus Katinas	Austria	143.739	44.74 (35)	8:37.52 (31)	2:21.74 (34)	–
NC38	Geoff Sandys	United Kingdom	146.065	46.23 (39)	8:32.22 (29)	2:25.84 (39)	–
NC39	Ludwig Kronfuß	Austria	148.099	45.43 (37)	9:01.79* (39)	2:25.47 (38)	–

*= Fell

== Attribution ==
In Dutch
