= Speed skating at the 1972 Winter Olympics – Men's 500 metres =

Speed skating at the Olympics

Men's 500 metres at the XI Olympic Winter Games
- Pictogram for speed skating
- Venue: Makomanai Open Stadium
- Dates: 5 February
- Competitors: 38 from 16 nations
- Winning time: 39.44 OR

Medalists
1st place, gold medalist(s)		Erhard Keller; West Germany
2nd place, silver medalist(s)		Hasse Börjes; Sweden
3rd place, bronze medalist(s)		Valery Muratov; Soviet Union

The men's 500 metres in speed skating at the 1972 Winter Olympics took place on 5 February, at the Makomanai Open Stadium.

== Records ==
Prior to this competition, the existing world and Olympic records were as follows:

World record	Leo Linkovesi (FIN)	38.0	Davos, Switzerland	8 January 1972
Olympic record	Terry McDermott (USA)	40.1	Innsbruck, Austria	4 February 1964

The following new Olympic and World records was set during the competition.

Date	Pair	Athlete	Country	Time	OR	WR
5 February	Pair 1	Hasse Börjes	Sweden	39.69	OR	
5 February	Pair 3	Erhard Keller	West Germany	39.44	OR	

== Results ==
Rank	Athlete	Country	Time	Notes
1st place, gold medalist(s)	Erhard Keller	West Germany	39.44	OR
2nd place, silver medalist(s)	Hasse Börjes	Sweden	39.69	
3rd place, bronze medalist(s)	Valery Muratov	Soviet Union	39.80	
4	Per Bjørang	Norway	39.91	
5	Seppo Hänninen	Finland	40.12	
6	Leo Linkovesi	Finland	40.14	
7	Ove König	Sweden	40.25	
8	Masaki Suzuki	Japan	40.35	
9	Mats Wallberg	Sweden	40.41	
10	Hans Lichtenstern	West Germany	40.55	
11	Pete Eberling	United States	40.58	
12	Lasse Efskind	Norway	40.60	
13	Takayuki Hida	Japan	40.62	
14	Vladimir Komarov	Soviet Union	40.65	
15	Neil Blatchford	United States	40.67	
16	Johan Granath	Sweden	40.79	
17	Norio Hirate	Japan	41.08	
18	Johan Lind	Norway	41.14	
19	Keiichi Suzuki	Japan	41.28	
20	Greg Lyman	United States	41.30	
21	Gerd Zimmermann	West Germany	41.35	
22	Jeong Chung-gu	South Korea	41.42	
23	Otmar Braunecker	Austria	42.14	
24	David Hampton	Great Britain	42.59	
25	Bruno Toniolli	Italy	42.67	
25	Eddy Verheijen	Netherlands	42.67	
27	Jouko Salakka	Finland	42.81	
28	Luvsanlkhagvyn Dashnyam	Mongolia	42.86	
29	Gerry Cassan	Canada	42.87	
30	John Cassidy	Canada	43.01	
31	Herbert Schwarz	West Germany	43.03	
32	Jappie van Dijk	Netherlands	43.04	
33	Richard Tourne	France	43.06	
34	Ard Schenk	Netherlands	43.40	
35	Jim Lynch	Australia	43.51	
36	Colin Coates	Australia	44.74	
-	Ole Christian Iversen	Norway	DNF	
-	John Wurster	United States	DNF	
