= Netherlands at the 1972 Winter Olympics =

- Flag of the Netherlands
- IOC code: NED (HOL used at these Games)
- NOC: Dutch Olympic Committee

in Sapporo
- Competitors: 11 (5 men, 6 women) in 2 sports
- Flag bearer: Atje Keulen-Deelstra (speed skating)
- Medals Ranked 4th: Gold 4 Silver 3 Bronze 2 Total 9

Winter Olympics appearances (overview)
- 1928; 1932; 1936; 1948; 1952; 1956; 1960; 1964; 1968; 1972; 1976; 1980; 1984; 1988; 1992; 1994; 1998; 2002; 2006; 2010; 2014; 2018; 2022; 2026

Athletes from the Netherlands competed at the 1972 Winter Olympics in Sapporo, Japan.

== Medalists ==
Medal	Name	Sport	Event
Gold	Ard Schenk	Speed skating	Men's 1500 metres
Gold	Ard Schenk	Speed skating	Men's 5000 metres
Gold	Ard Schenk	Speed skating	Men's 10,000 metres
Gold	Stien Baas-Kaiser	Speed skating	Women's 3000 metres
Silver	Kees Verkerk	Speed skating	Men's 10,000 metres
Silver	Atje Keulen-Deelstra	Speed skating	Women's 1000 metres
Silver	Stien Baas-Kaiser	Speed skating	Women's 1500 metres
Bronze	Atje Keulen-Deelstra	Speed skating	Women's 1500 metres
Bronze	Atje Keulen-Deelstra	Speed skating	Women's 3000 metres

== Figure skating ==
Athlete	Event	CF	FS	Points	Places	Final rank
Dianne de Leeuw	Women's singles	15	16	2298.7	143	16

== Speed skating ==
Men

Event	Athlete	Race	
Event	Athlete	Time	Rank
500 m	Jappie van Dijk	43.03	32
500 m	Ard Schenk	43.40	34
500 m	Eddy Verheijen	42.67	25
1500 m	Jan Bols	2:06.58	5
1500 m	Ard Schenk	2:02.96 OR	1st place, gold medalist(s)
1500 m	Eddy Verheijen	2:10.96	19
1500 m	Kees Verkerk	2:07.43	8
5000 m	Jan Bols	7:39.40	8
5000 m	Ard Schenk	7:23.61	1st place, gold medalist(s)
5000 m	Kees Verkerk	7:39.17	6
10,000 m	Jan Bols	15:17.99	4
10,000 m	Ard Schenk	15:01.35 OR	1st place, gold medalist(s)
10,000 m	Kees Verkerk	15:04.70	2nd place, silver medalist(s)

Women

Event	Athlete	Race	
Event	Athlete	Time	Rank
500 m	Ellie van den Brom	45.62	10
500 m	Atje Keulen-Deelstra	44.89	6
500 m	Trijnie Rep	46.60	20
1000 m	Ellie van den Brom	1:32.60	7
1000 m	Atje Keulen-Deelstra	1:31.61	2nd place, silver medalist(s)
1000 m	Trijnie Rep	1:35.82	24
1500 m	Stien Baas-Kaiser	2:21.05	2nd place, silver medalist(s)
1500 m	Ellie van den Brom	2:22.27	4
1500 m	Atje Keulen-Deelstra	2:22.05	3rd place, bronze medalist(s)
3000 m	Stien Baas-Kaiser	4:52.14 OR	1st place, gold medalist(s)
3000 m	Atje Keulen-Deelstra	4:59.91	3rd place, bronze medalist(s)
3000 m	Sippie Tigchelaar	5:01.67	4
