= World record progression big combination speed skating men =

The world record progression of the men's speed skating big combination as recognised by the International Skating Union:

#	Name	times (500 - 5000 / 1500 - 10000)	Points	Date	Venue	Meet	Ref
1	(Norway) Sverre Farstad	41.8 - 8:15.4 / 2:13.9 - 17:39.7	188.958	5–6 February 1949	(Switzerland) Davos	European Championships	
2	(Soviet Union) Dmitry Sakunenko	42.6 - 7:54.9 / 2:13.0 - 16:44.3	184.638	9–10 January 1955	(Soviet Union) Medeu		
3	(West Germany) Günter Traub	43.1 - 8:12.1 / 2:09.3 - 16:21.6	184.490	19–20 January 1963	(Italy) Madonna di Campiglio		
4	(Norway) Knut Johannesen	43.3 - 7:47.1 / 2:13.8 - 16:08.5	183.035	19–20 January 1963	(Norway) Hamar	Norwegian Allround Championships	
5	(Norway) Nils Aaness	41.6 - 7:42.8 / 2:10.8 - 16:21.6	180.560	26–27 January 1963	(Norway) Oslo	Norway–USSR Match	
6	(Sweden) Jonny Nilsson	43.0 - 7:34.3 / 2:10.1 - 15:33.0	178.447	23–24 February 1963	(Japan) Karuizawa	World Allround Championships	
7	(Norway) Fred Anton Maier	43.6 - 7:33.1 / 2:08.2 - 15:32.2	178.253	5–6 February 1966	(Norway) Oslo		
8	(Netherlands) Kees Verkerk	42.1 - 7:30.4 / 2:10.0 - 15:51.7	178.058	11–12 February 1967	(Norway) Oslo	World Allround Championships	
9	(Norway) Svein-Erik Stiansen	41.8 - 7:27.6 / 2:07.7 - 15:57.1	176.982	13–14 January 1968	(Italy) Madonna di Campiglio	Trofeo Alberto Nicolodi	
10	(West Germany) Günter Traub	41.7 - 7:40.2 / 2:05.6 - 15:42.6	176.717	20–21 January 1968	(West Germany) Inzell	West German Allround Championships	
11	(Norway) Fred Anton Maier	42.7 - 7:25.0 / 2:08.4 - 15:26.8	176.340	24–25 February 1968	(Sweden) Göteborg	World Allround Championships	
12	(Netherlands) Kees Verkerk	40.4 - 7:19.9 / 2:03.7 - 15:28.7	172.058	9–10 March 1968	(West Germany) Inzell		
13	(Sweden) Göran Claeson	40.2 - 7:17.0 / 2:05.2 - 15:22.5	171.758	1–2 March 1969	(West Germany) Inzell		
14	(Netherlands) Jan Bols	40.51 - 7:19.8 / 2:04.4 - 15:11.1	171.512	7–8 March 1970	(West Germany) Inzell		
15	(Netherlands) Ard Schenk	40.29 - 7:25.9 / 2:02.3 - 15:13.4	171.317	30–31 January 1971	(Norway) Oslo		
16	(Netherlands) Ard Schenk	40.57 - 7:18.8 / 2:04.8 - 15:01.6	171.130	13–14 February 1971	(Sweden) Göteborg	World Allround Championships	
17	(Netherlands) Ard Schenk	39.82 - 7:12.0 / 2:01.3 - 14:55.9	168.248	13–14 March 1971	(West Germany) Inzell		
18	(Netherlands) Ard Schenk	39.0 - 7:09.8 / 1:58.8 - 15:16.8	167.420	4–5 March 1972	(West Germany) Inzell		
19	(Netherlands) Piet Kleine	40.69 - 7:02.38 / 1:56.28 - 14:43.92	165.884	12–13 March 1976	(West Germany) Inzell		
20	(Norway) Jan Egil Storholt	38.07 - 7:01.16 / 1:55.18 - 14:52.84	163.221	19–20 March 1977	(Soviet Union) Medeu	USSR–Norway Match	
21	(United States) Eric Heiden	38.22 - 6:59.15 / 1:56.05 - 14:43.11	162.973	11–12 February 1979	(Norway) Oslo	World Allround Championships	
22	(Soviet Union) Viktor Shasherin	37.63 - 6:55.43 / 1:54.36 - 14:45.14	161.550	25–26 March 1983	(Soviet Union) Medeu	USSR–GDR Match	
23	(Soviet Union) Viktor Shasherin	38.04 - 6:49.15 / 1:53.80 - 14:38.39	160.807	23–24 March 1984	(Soviet Union) Medeu		
24	(Soviet Union) Nikolay Gulyayev	37.24 - 6:51.28 / 1:52.70 - 14:28.45	159.356	14–15 February 1987	(Netherlands) Heerenveen	World Allround Championships	
25	(Norway) Johann Olav Koss	38.46 - 6:41.73 / 1:52.76 - 13:43.54	157.396	9–10 February 1991	(Netherlands) Heerenveen	World Allround Championships	
26	(Italy) Roberto Sighel	37.38 - 6:43.91 / 1:52.38 - 13:58.39	157.150	21–22 March 1992	(Canada) Calgary	World Allround Championships	
27	(Netherlands) Falko Zandstra	37.90 - 6:40.01 / 1:52.90 - 13:46.96	156.882	22–23 January 1993	(Netherlands) Heerenveen	European Championships	
28	(Netherlands) Rintje Ritsma	37.30 - 6:39.46 / 1:51.60 / 13:55.11	156.201	7–9 January 1994	(Norway) Hamar	European Championships	
29	(Japan) Keiji Shirahata	37.78 - 6:37.80 / 1:50.91 - 13:48.72	155.966	3–4 January 1998	(Japan) Nagano	Japanese Allround Championships	
30	(Netherlands) Ids Postma	36.48 - 6:33.09 / 1:48.85 / 13:45.91	153.367	13–15 March 1998	(Netherlands) Heerenveen	World Allround Championships	
31	(Netherlands) Rintje Ritsma	36:51 - 6:30:38 / 1:48:69 - 13:37:47	152.651	6–7 February 1999	(Norway) Hamar	World Allround Championships	
32	(Netherlands) Jochem Uytdehaage	36.59 - 6:30.27 / 1:49.51 / 13:27.25	152.482	15–17 March 2002	(Netherlands) Heerenveen	World Allround Championships	
33	(Netherlands) Mark Tuitert	36.18 - 6:27.63 / 1:47.41 / 13:38.91	151.691	9–11 January 2004	(Netherlands) Heerenveen	European Championships	
34	(United States) Chad Hedrick	36.49 - 6:20.69 / 1:47.51 - 13:21.67	150.478	7–8 February 2004	(Norway) Hamar	World Allround Championships	
35	(United States) Shani Davis	35.85 - 6:24.21 / 1:43.33 - 13:32.90	149.359	8–9 January 2005	(United States) Salt Lake City	American World Championships qualification	
36	(United States) Chad Hedrick	36.23 - 6:16.93 / 1:44.92 - 13:18.06	148.799	21–22 January 2006	(Canada) Calgary	American World Championships qualification	
37	(United States) Shani Davis	35.17 - 6:10.49 / 1:42.68 - 13:05.94	145.742	18–19 March 2006	(Canada) Calgary	World Allround Championships	
38	(Netherlands) Patrick Roest	35.74 - 6:08.27 / 1:43.31 - 12:51.17	145.561	2–3 March 2019	(Canada) Calgary	World Allround Championships	
39	(United States) Jordan Stolz	34.10 - 6:14.76 / 1:41.78 - 13:04.76	144.740	9–10 March 2024	(Germany) Inzell	World Allround Championships	
