= Hans Lichtenstern =

German speed skater

Personal information
- Nationality: German
- Born: 4 October 1948 (age 76); Munich, Germany

Sport
- Sport: Speed skating

Hans Lichtenstern (born 4 October 1948) is a German speed skater. He competed in the men's 500 metres event at the 1972 Winter Olympics.
