= Greg Lyman =

American speed skater

Personal information
- Nationality: American
- Born: March 9, 1950 (age 76) Gary, Indiana, United States

Sport
- Sport: Speed skating

Greg Lyman (born March 9, 1950) is an American speed skater. He competed in the men's 500 metres event at the 1972 Winter Olympics.
