= Gerry Cassan =

Canadian speed skater

Personal information
- Born: 5 December 1954 (age 70); Ottawa, Ontario, Canada

Sport
- Sport: Speed skating

Gerry Cassan (born 5 December 1954) is a Canadian speed skater. He competed in the men's 500 metres event at the 1972 Winter Olympics.
