= World record progression 3000 m speed skating men =

The world record progression 3000 m speed skating men as recognised by the International Skating Union:

Name	Result	Date	Venue
(Finland) Clas Thunberg	5:19.2	8 January 1932	Davos
(Norway) Michael Staksrud	4:59.1	25 February 1933	Hamar
(Norway) Ivar Ballangrud	4:49.6	29 January 1935	Davos
(Sweden) Åke Seyffarth	4:45.7	3 February 1942	Davos
(Netherlands) Anton Huiskes	4:40.2	24 January 1953	Davos
(Norway) Knut Johannesen	4:33.9	12 January 1963	Tønsberg
(Norway) Ivar Eriksen	4:33.0	28 February 1963	Oslo
(Sweden) Jonny Nilsson	4:27.6	23 March 1963	Tolga
(Soviet Union) Ants Antson	4:27.3	11 February 1964	Oslo
(Netherlands) Rudie Liebrechts	4:26.8	25 February 1965	Oslo
(Netherlands) Ard Schenk	4:26.2	29 January 1966	Inzell
(Netherlands) Ard Schenk	4:18.4	25 February 1967	Inzell
(Norway) Fred Anton Maier	4:17.5	7 March 1968	Inzell
(Norway) Dag Fornæss	4:17.4	28 January 1969	Misurina
(Netherlands) Jan Bols	4:16.4	27 January 1970	Misurina
(Netherlands) Ard Schenk	4:12.6	15 January 1971	Davos
(Netherlands) Ard Schenk	4:08.3	2 March 1972	Inzell
(United States) Eric Heiden	4:07.01	2 March 1978	Inzell
(United States) Eric Heiden	4:06.91	18 March 1979	Savalen
(Soviet Union) Dmitry Ogloblin	4:04.06	28 March 1979	Medeo
(East Germany) André Hoffmann	4:03.31	12 January 1985	Davos
(Soviet Union) Viktor Shasherin	4:03.22	18 January 1986	Davos
(Netherlands) Leo Visser	3:59.27	19 March 1987	Heerenveen
(Norway) Johann Olav Koss	3:57.52	13 March 1990	Heerenveen
(Netherlands) Thomas Bos	3:56.16	3 April 1992	Calgary
(Netherlands) Bob de Jong	3:53.06	8 March 1996	Calgary
(Netherlands) Jelmer Beulenkamp	3:52.67	25 February 1998	Heerenveen
(Belgium) Bart Veldkamp	3:48.91	21 March 1998	Calgary
(Canada) Steven Elm	3:45.23	19 March 1999	Calgary
(Canada) Steven Elm	3:43.76	17 March 2000	Calgary
(Netherlands) Gianni Romme	3:42.75	11 August 2000	Calgary
(United States) Chad Hedrick	3:39.02	10 March 2005	Calgary
(Norway) Eskil Ervik	3:37.28	5 November 2005	Calgary
(Netherlands) Sven Kramer	3:37.15	17 November 2007	Heerenveen
(Czech Republic) Metoděj Jílek	3:32.52	26 October 2025	Salt Lake City
