= Eddy Verheijen =

Dutch speed skater

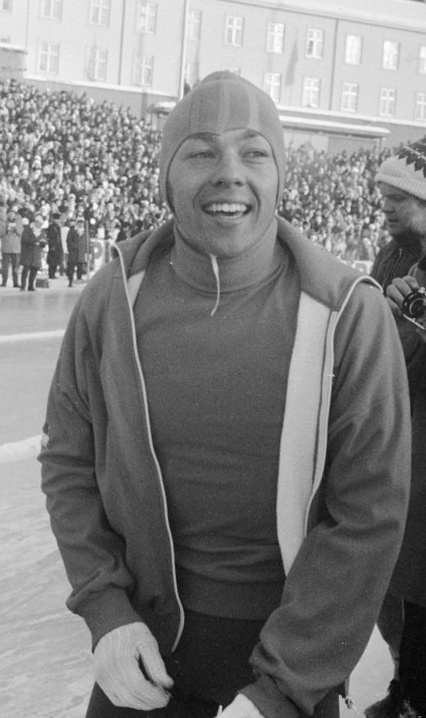
- Verheijen in 1970

Personal information
- Full name: Frits Eddy Verheijen
- Born: 21 March 1946 (age 80) Vaals, the Netherlands
- Height: 1.71 m (5 ft 7 in)
- Weight: 63 kg (139 lb)

Sport
- Sport: Speed skating

Frits Eddy Verheijen (born 21 March 1946) is a retired speed skater from the Netherlands. He competed at the 1972 Winter Olympics in the 500 and 1500 meter events finishing in 25th and 19th place, respectively.

Verheijen married Rieneke Demming, an international speed skater. Their two sons, Frank and Carl, also became prominent speed skaters.

== Personal records ==
Personal records
Men's Speed skating
Event	Result	Date	Location	Notes
500 meter	40.2	2 March 1972	Inzell	
1000 meter	1:22.8	19 January 1971	Davos	
1500 meter	2:01.4	6 February 1971	Davos	
3000 meter	4:10.7	2 March 1972	Inzell	
5000 meter	7:20.6	4 March 1972	Inzell	
10000 meter	15:15.3	5 March 1972	Inzell	

Source
Verheijen has a score of 170.491 points on the Adelskalender

== Tournament overview ==
Season	Dutch Championships Allround	European Championships Allround	World Championships Allround	Olympic Games	ISSF World Championships	ISSF European Championships
1965–66	DEVENTER 4th 500m 7th 5000m 5th 1500m 7th 10000m 5th overall	DEVENTER 28th 500m 19th 5000m 21st 1500m DNQ 10000m NC overall(26th)				
1966–67	AMSTERDAM 17th 500m 13th 5000m 13th 1500m 8th 10000m 13th overall					
1967–68	AMSTERDAM 13th 500m 6th 5000m 12th 1500m (bronze) 10000m 8th overall					
1968–69	HEERENVEEN 11th 500m 9th 5000m 7th 1500m (bronze) 10000m 6th overall	INZELL 20th 500m 9th 5000m 12th 1500m 8th 10000m 12th overall	DEVENTER 27th 500m 15th 5000m 18th 1500m 14th 10000m 15th overall			
1969–70	DEVENTER 10th 500m 4th 5000m 6th 1500m 6th 10000m 5th overall		OSLO 18th 500m 8th 5000m 7th 1500m 5th 10000m 9th overall			
1970–71	AMSTERDAM (bronze) 500m 5th 5000m (bronze) 1500m (silver) 10000m (bronze) overall	HEERENVEEN 5th 500m 10th 5000m 12th 1500m 8th 10000m 6th overall	GOTHENBURG 13h 500m 8th 5000m 8th 1500m 6th 10000m 7th overall			
1971–72	DEVENTER 5th 500m (gold) 5000m (silver) 1500m (gold) 10000m (bronze) overall	DAVOS 15th 500m 5th 5000m 8th 1500m 4th 10000m 8th overall	OSLO 14th 500m (bronze) 5000m (bronze) 1500m 4th 10000m 5th overall	SAPPORO 25th 500m 19th 1500m		
1972–73					GOTHENBURG 8th 500m 7th 5000m 6th 1500m 4th 10000m 8th overall	SKIEN 8th 500m 4th 5000m 8th 1500m 4th 10000m 7th overall

- ISSL = International Speed Skating League [defunct]
- NC = No classification
- DNQ = Did not qualify for the final distance
