= Jeong Chung-gu =

South Korean speed skater

Personal information
- Nationality: South Korean
- Born: 5 March 1949 (age 76)

Sport
- Sport: Speed skating

Jeong Chung-gu (born 5 March 1949) is a South Korean speed skater. He had competed in two events at the 1972 Winter Olympics.
