= John Cassidy (speed skater) =

Canadian speed skater

Personal information
- Born: 7 June 1952 (age 72); Montreal, Quebec, Canada

Sport
- Sport: Speed skating

John Cassidy (born 7 June 1952) is a Canadian speed skater. He competed in the men's 500 metres event at the 1972 Winter Olympics.
