= Andrew Barron (speed skater) =

Canadian speed skater

Andrew Barron (born May 2, 1951 in Penrith, Cumberland, England) is a former ice speed skater, who represented Canada in two consecutive Winter Olympics, starting in 1972 in Sapporo, Japan. Barron is a resident of Canmore, Alberta.
