= Magne Thomassen =

Norwegian speed skater (born 1941)

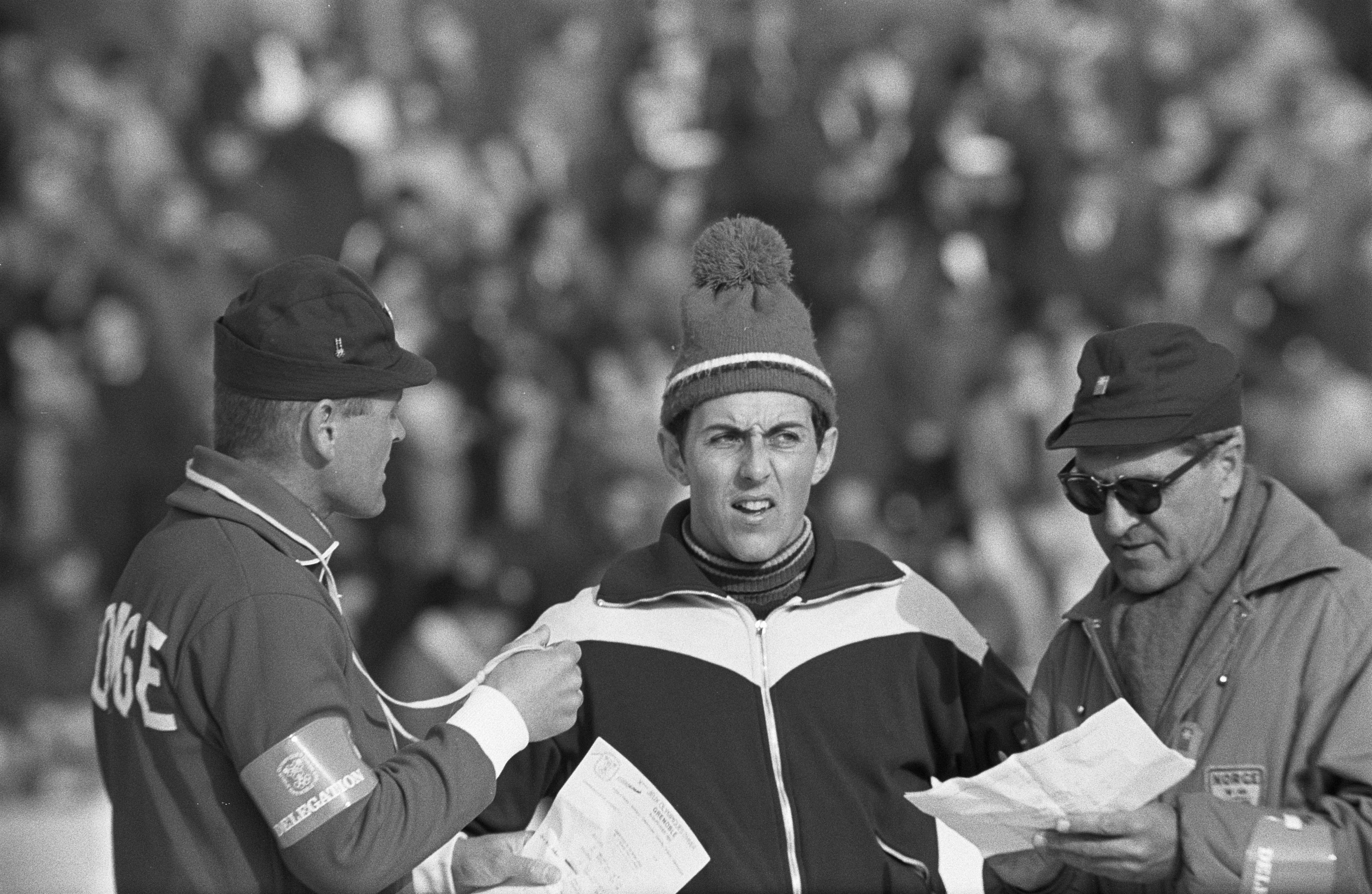
- Thomassen with coaches at the 1968 Olympics

Personal information
- Born: 1 May 1941 (age 85) Melhus Municipality, Reichskommissariat Norwegen (today Norway)
- Height: 1.81 m (5 ft 11 in)
- Weight: 77 kg (170 lb)

Sport
- Country: Norway
- Sport: Speed skating
- Club: Trondhjems Skøiteklub

Achievements and titles
- Personal bests: 500 m: 39.8 (1970); 1000 m: 1:21.0 (1971); 1500 m: 2:02.5 (1968); 3000 m: 4:23.1 (1968); 5000 m: 7:22.3 (1969); 10 000 m: 15:23.3 (1969)
Medal record
Men's speed skating
Representing Norway
Olympic Games
Silver medal – second place	1968 Grenoble	500 m
World Allround Championships
Silver medal – second place	1968 Gothenburg	Allround
Silver medal – second place	1970 Oslo	Allround
World Sprint Championships
Bronze medal – third place	1970 West Allis	Sprint
European Allround Championships
Bronze medal – third place	1968 Oslo	Allround

Magne Thomassen (born 1 May 1941) is a former speed skater from Norway. He participated in international championships over a period of more than ten years. He took part in 23 country matches for Norway in the period 1959–1971 and competed in the European Speed Skating Championships, World Allround Speed Skating Championships and World Sprint Speed Skating Championships between 1962 and 1972.

== Biography ==
After setting a world record on the 1,500 meters with the time 2:02.5 on 5 February 1972, Magne Thomassen conquered the first position on the Adelskalenderen ranking for a period of two days until Kees Verkerk regained that position.

Thomassen became Norwegian allround champion in 1968. He became the first winner of the Norwegian sprint speed skating championship in 1970, a title he also won the year thereafter.

Thomassen won silver in the 500 m event of the 1968 Winter Olympic Games, silver in the World Allround Speed Skating Championships in 1968 and 1970, bronze in the 1970 World Sprint Speed Skating Championships as well as bronze in the 1968 allround European Speed Skating Championships.

He represented the club Trondhjems Skøiteklub.

== Records ==
=== World record ===
Discipline	Time	Date	Location
1500 m	2.02,5	5 February 1968	(Switzerland) Davos

Source: SpeedSkatingStats.com

=== Personal records ===
To put these personal records in perspective, the WR column lists the official world records on the dates that Thomassen skated his personal records.

Event	Result	Date	Venue	WR
500 m	39.8	27 January 1970	Cortina d'Ampezzo	38.87
1,000 m	1:21.0	20 February 1971	Inzell	1:19.2
1,500 m	2:02.5	5 February 1968	Davos	2:03.9
3,000 m	4:23.1	28 January 1969	Cortina d'Ampezzo	4:17.5
5,000 m	7:22.3	1 March 1969	Inzell	7:16.7
10,000 m	15:23.3	10 March 1968	Inzell	15:20.3
Big combination	173.252	10 March 1968	Inzell	176.340

Note that Thomassen's score on the Big combination was no world record because Kees Verkerk skated an even lower total of points on that day.
