= Osamu Naito =

Japanese speed skater (born 1949)

Personal information
- Nationality: Japanese
- Born: 14 April 1949 Usuda, Japan
- Died: 22 October 2016 (aged 67)

Sport
- Sport: Speed skating

Osamu Naito (14 April 1949 – 22 October 2016) was a Japanese speed skater. He competed in two events at the 1972 Winter Olympics.
