= Takayuki Hida =

Japanese speed skater (born 1944)

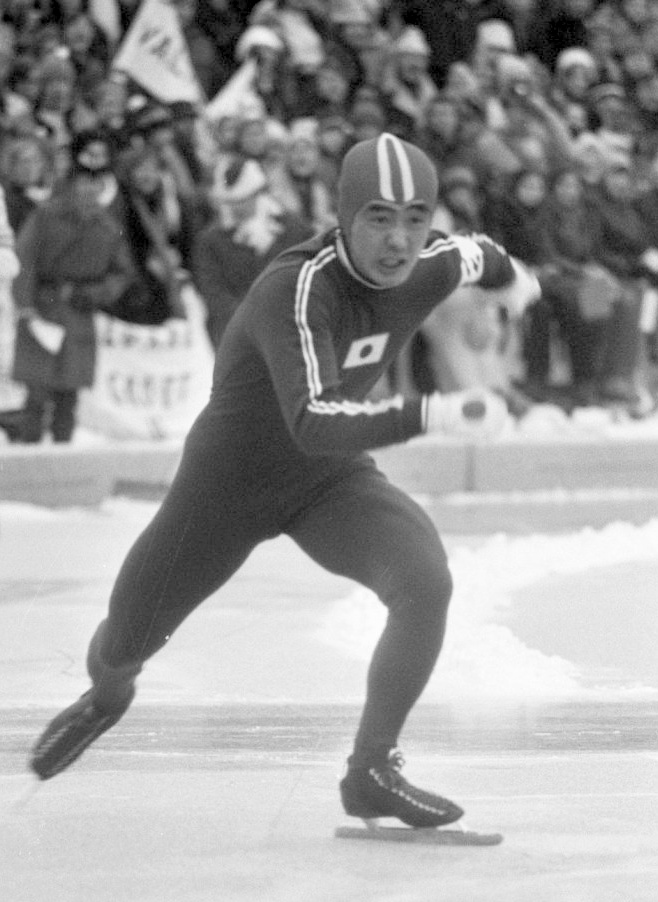
- Takayuki Hida in 1972

Personal information
- Born: May 4, 1944 (age 82) Hokkaido, Japan
- Height: 1.70 m (5 ft 7 in)
- Weight: 65 kg (143 lb)

Sport
- Sport: Speed skating
- Club: Sankyo Seiki

Takayuki Hida (肥田隆行, Hida Takayuki; born May 4, 1944) is a retired Japanese speed skater. He competed at the 1968 and 1972 Winter Olympics in the 500 m events and finished in 37th and 13th place, respectively. His best achievement in the world sprint championships was fourth place in 1971.

Personal bests:

- 500 m – 38.4 (1971)
- 1000 m – 1:20.8 (1971)
- 1500 m – 2:07.9 (1971)
