= Clark King =

American speed skater

Personal information
- Born: December 1, 1949 (age 76) Burbank, California, United States

Sport
- Sport: Speed skating

Clark King (born December 1, 1949) is an American speed skater. He competed in three events at the 1972 Winter Olympics.
