= Roar Grønvold =

Norwegian speed skater

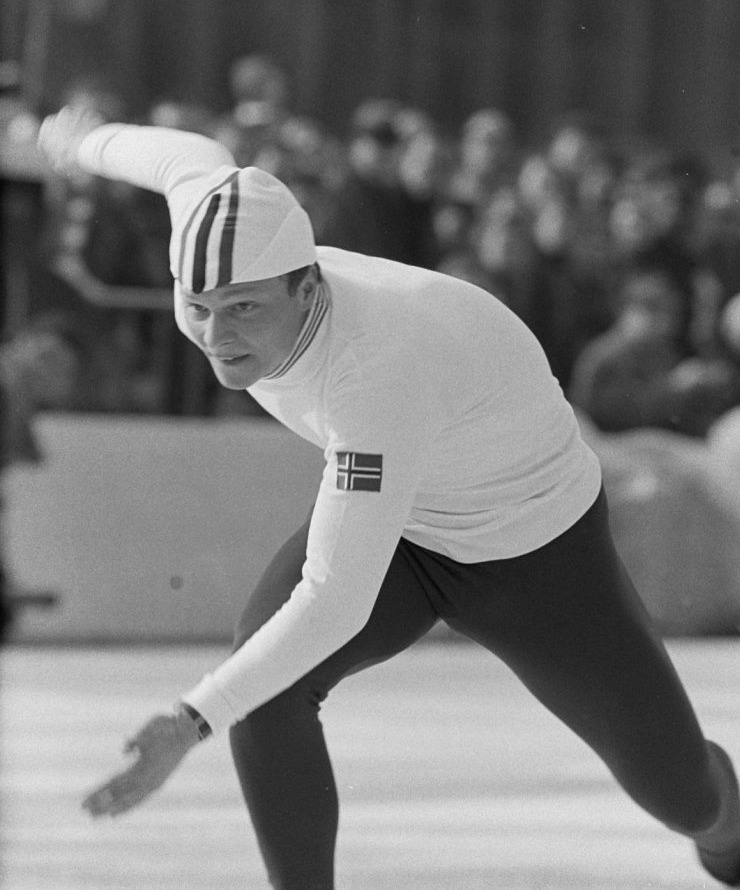
- Roar Grønvold at the 1968 Olympics

Personal information
- Born: 19 March 1946 (age 80) Hvittingfoss, Norway
- Height: 1.86 m (6 ft 1 in)
- Weight: 80 kg (180 lb)

Sport
- Sport: Speed skating
- Club: Tønsbergs Turnforening

Achievements and titles
- Personal best(s): 500 m: 39:3 (1972); 1000 m: 1:21.32 (1972); 1500 m: 2:01.45 (1972); 3000 m: 4:15.7 (1972); 5000 m: 7:22.55 (1972); 10 000 m: 15:19.98 (1972)
Medal record
Representing Norway
Olympic Games
Silver medal – second place	1972 Sapporo	1,500 m
Silver medal – second place	1972 Sapporo	5,000 m

Roar Grønvold (born 19 March 1946) is a former speed skater from Norway.

Grønvold had his best year in 1972 when he became Norwegian Allround Champion and won silver at the Norwegian Sprint Championships. In addition, he won silver at the 1972 Winter Olympics of Sapporo on both the 1,500 m and the 5,000 m, and he won silver at both the European Allround and the World Allround Championships. All four of those Olympic, World, and European silver medals were behind Ard Schenk.

In 1973, Grønvold joined the short-lived professional league, winning bronze at the Professional World Allround Championships that year and silver at the Professional European Allround Championships. At both those championships, it was again Ard Schenk who won the gold medals. In 1974, Grønvold again won silver at the Professional European Allround Championships, this time behind fellow Norwegian Bjørn Tveter. The professional league was dissolved that same year and that also meant the end of Grønvold's skating career. After his speed skating career ended, Grønvold became a speed skating coach.

== Medals ==
An overview of medals won by Grønvold at important championships he participated in, listing the years in which he won each:

Championships	Gold medal	Silver medal	Bronze medal
Winter Olympics	–	1972 (1,500 m); 1972 (5,000 m)	–
World Allround	–	1972	–
World Sprint	–	–	–
European Allround	–	1972	–
Norwegian Allround	1972	1970; 1971	–
Norwegian Sprint	–	1972	–

== Personal records ==
To put these personal records in perspective, the WR column lists the official world records on the dates that Grønvold skated his personal records.

Event	Result	Date	Venue	WR
500 m	39.3	2 March 1972	Inzell	38.0
1,000 m	1:21.32	26 February 1972	Eskilstuna	1:18.8
1,500 m	2:01.45	23 January 1972	Davos	1:58.7
3,000 m	4:15.7	2 March 1972	Inzell	4:12.6
5,000 m	7:22.55	22 January 1972	Davos	7:12.0
10,000 m	15:19.98	23 January 1972	Davos	14:55.9
Big combination	170.647	23 January 1972	Davos	168.248

Grønvold has an Adelskalender score of 170.037 points. His highest ranking on the Adelskalender was a fifth place.
