= Gary Jonland =

American speed skater

Personal information
- Born: June 21, 1952 (age 74) Chicago, Illinois, United States

Sport
- Sport: Speed skating

Gary Jonland (born June 21, 1952) is an American speed skater. He competed in the men's 1500 metres event at the 1972 Winter Olympics.
