= Willy Olsen =

Norwegian speed skater

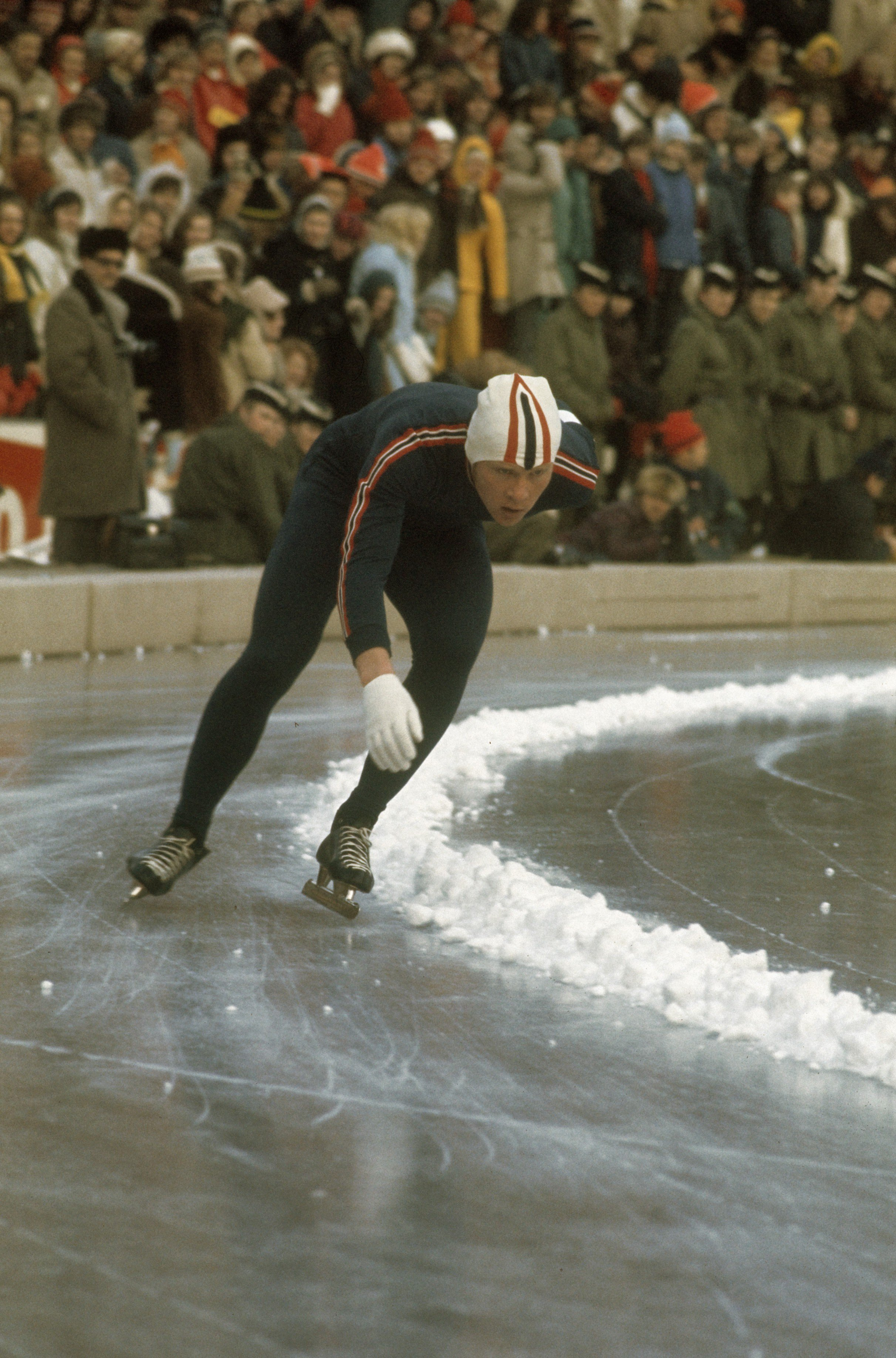
- Willy Olsen in 1972

Personal information
- Nationality: Norwegian
- Born: 28 February 1950 (age 75); Tynset Municipality`Tynset, Norway

Sport
- Sport: Speed skating
- Club: Tynset IF

Willy Olsen (born 28 February 1950) is a retired Norwegian speed skater from Tynset Municipality who competed internationally in the 1970s. His strength was in the long distances, and he won the 5000 metres event at the national championship in 1972. At the 1972 Winter Olympics in Sapporo, he finished 5th in the 5000 metres.

Olsen joined the first professional league, International Speed Skating League, in 1973. After the dissolution of the league in 1974, Olsen became a speed skating coach.
