= Jan Bols =

Dutch speed skater

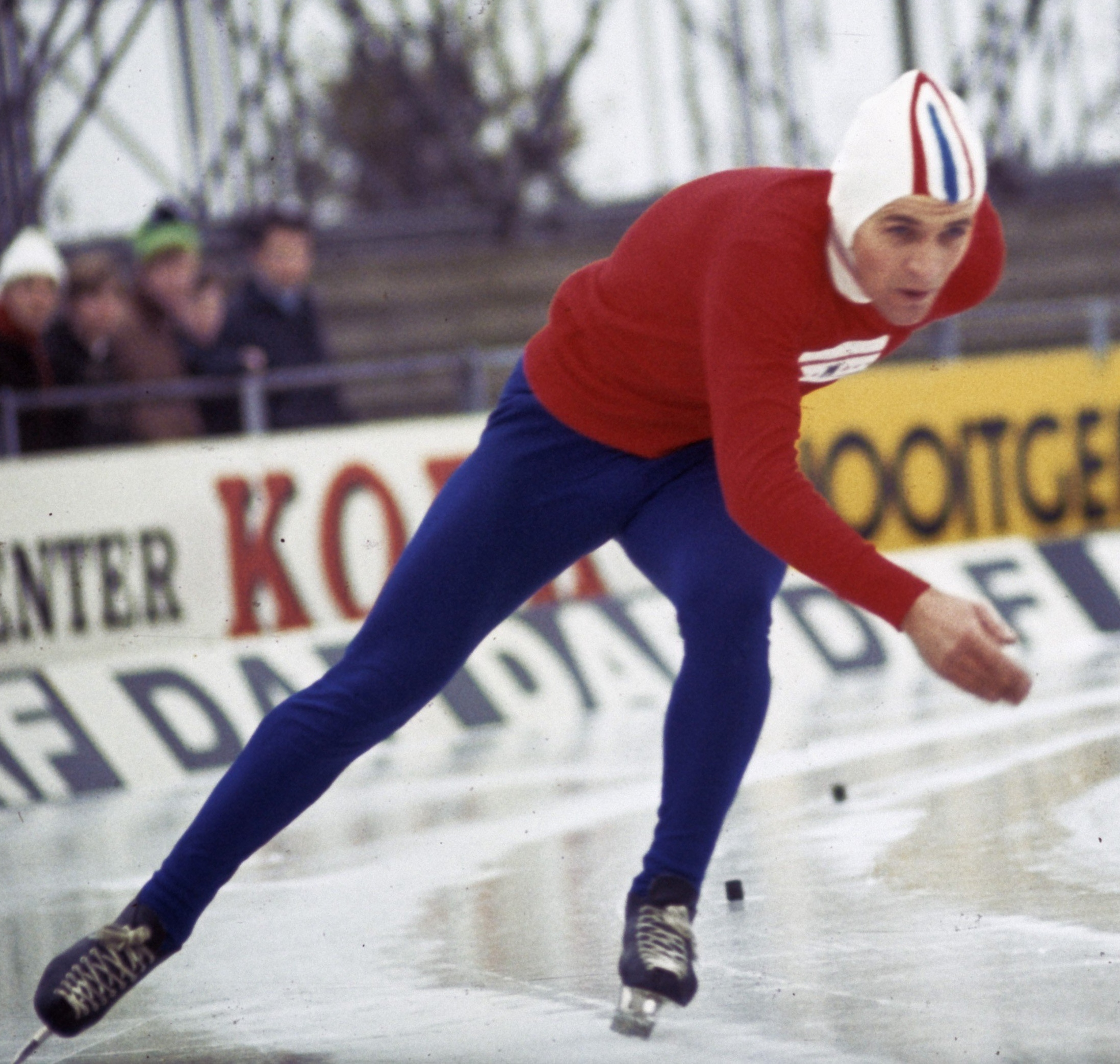
- Jan Bols in 1968

Personal information
- Born: 27 August 1944 (age 81) Hoogeveen, Netherlands
- Height: 1.75 m (5 ft 9 in)
- Weight: 69 kg (152 lb)

Sport
- Country: Netherlands
- Sport: Speed skating
Medal record
Representing the Netherlands
World Allround Championships
Bronze medal – third place	1972 Oslo	Allround
European Championships
Bronze medal – third place	1972 Davos	Allround

Jan Bols (born 27 August 1944 in Hoogeveen, Drenthe) is a former Dutch long track speed skater. Bols was among the top all-rounders in the late 60s and early 70s, this period overlapped the glory days of Kees Verkerk and Ard Schenk, so that he tends to be known as the third best Dutch skater of his time.

Bols participated in the 1968 and 1972 Olympics, but, as an all-rounder rather than a distance specialist, he did not win medals. His best results were a fifth place on the 1,500 m and a fourth place on the 10,000 m in 1972 in Sapporo. He also came in fourth at both the European and World all-round championships in 1970.

In 1971 he won the Dutch championships ahead of Verkerk and Schenk. He was in excellent shape at the European Championships in Heerenveen that year and finished second at both the 500m and 5000m the first day and was first in the standing. During the 5000m a failure to change lanes resulted in him skating two outer lanes in a row (i.e. he skated about 25 m longer) and a disqualification. The next day, his fans waved a commercial Bols flag half-staff in the stadium.

Bols did (bronze) medal in both the 1972 European and World all-round championships. The next year, he joined most top skaters in a short-lived professional league, finishing third and second in their championships in 1973 and 1974. After retiring from competitions in 1974 he ran a sporting goods shop in his hometown of Hoogeveen.

== Personal records ==
Personal records
Men's speed skating
Event	Result	Date	Location	Notes
500 meter	39.4	15 January 1972	Davos	
1000 meter	1:20.4	19 January 1971	Davos	
1500 meter	2:01.6	22 January 1972	Davos	
3000 meter	4:13.5	2 March 1972	Inzell	
5000 meter	7:10.7	4 March 1972	Inzell	
10000 meter	15:10.2	5 March 1972	Inzell	

- Bols has an Adelskalender score of 168.513 points. He reached second place on this ranking list from 7 February 1970 to 16 January 1971 and would retain third place until March 1975.

== World records ==
Nr.	Event	Result	Date	Location	Note
1.	3000 meter	4:16.4	27 January 1970	Cortina d'Ampezzo	World record until 15 January 1971
2.	Big combination	171.512	8 March 1970	Ludwig Schwabl Stadion, Inzell	World record until 31 January 1971

== Tournament overview ==
Season	Dutch Championships Allround	European Championships Allround	Olympic Games	World Championships Allround	World Championships Sprint	ISSL European Allround	ISSL World Allround
1965–66	DEVENTER 17th 500m 21st 5000m 18th 1500m DNQ 10000m NC overall(22nd)						
1966–67	AMSTERDAM 8th 500m 9th 5000m 12th 1500m 4th 10000m 7th overall						
1967–68	AMSTERDAM 15th 500m 4th 5000m 8th 1500m (gold) 10000m (bronze) overall	OSLO 8th 500m 6th 5000m 6th 1500m (bronze) 10000m 5th overall	GRENOBLE DNF 500m 16th 1500m 8th 5000m 13th 10000m	GOTHENBURG 19th 500m (bronze) 5000m 7th 1500m (silver) 10000m 5th overall			
1968–69	HEERENVEEN (silver) 500m (silver) 5000m (silver) 1500m (silver) 10000m (silver) overall	INZELL 18th 500m 11th 5000m 17th 1500m 10th 10000m 14th overall		DEVENTER 15th 500m 5th 5000m 15th 1500m (gold) 10000m 9th overall			
1969–70	DEVENTER 4th 500m (gold) 5000m 5th 1500m (gold) 10000m (silver) overall	INNSBRUCK 8th 500m (silver) 5000m 7th 1500m (silver) 10000m 4th overall		OSLO 14th 500m (gold) 5000m 9th 1500m (gold) 10000m 4th overall			
1970–71	AMSTERDAM (silver) 500m (gold) 5000m (bronze) 1500m (gold) 10000m (gold) overall	HEERENVEEN (silver) 500m (silver) 5000m DNS 1500m DNS 10000m NC overall		GOTHENBURG 7th 500m 4th 5000m 6th 1500m 9th 10000m 6th overall	INZELL 26th 500m 7th 1000m 19th 500m 7th 1000m 13th overall		
1971–72	DEVENTER (silver) 500m (bronze) 5000m 4th 1500m (silver) 10000m (silver) overall	DAVOS 11th 500m (silver) 5000m (bronze) 1500m (silver) 10000m (bronze) overall	SAPPORO 5th 1500m 8th 5000m 4th 10000m	OSLO 9th 500m (silver) 5000m 7th 1500m (silver) 10000m (bronze) overall	ESKILSTUNA 20th 500m 14th 1000m 26th 500m 9th 1000m 19th overall		
1972–73						SKIEN 4th 500m 5th 5000m 6th 1500m (gold) 10000m (bronze) overall	GOTHENBURG 5th 500m (silver) 5000m (silver) 1500m (silver) 10000m (silver) overall
1973–74						TYNSET 6th 500m 6th 5000m 8th 1500m 5th 10000m 8th overall	

NC = No classification

== Medals won ==
Championship	Gold (gold)	Silver (silver)	Bronze (bronze)
Dutch Allround	1	3	1
European Allround	0	0	1
Olympic Games	0	0	0
World Allround	0	0	1
World Sprint	0	0	0
ISSL European Allround	0	0	1
ISSL World Allround	0	1	0
