= Göran Johansson (speed skater, born 1941) =

Swedish speed skater

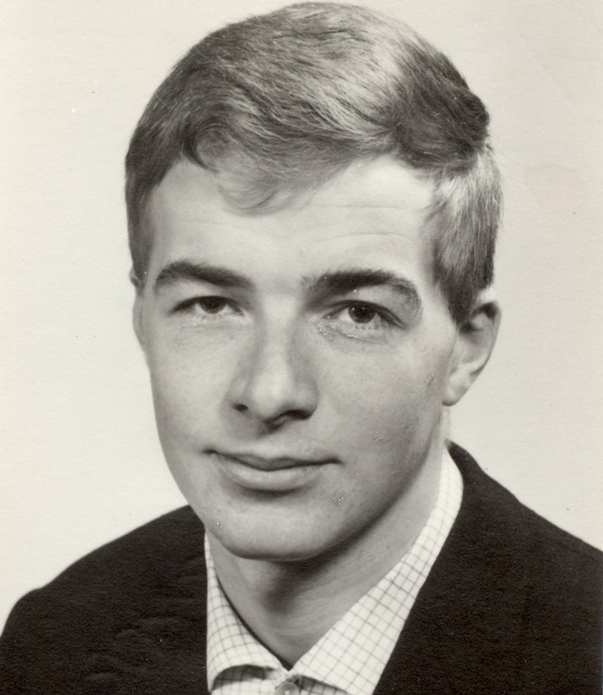
- Johansson in 1972

Personal information
- Nationality: Swedish
- Born: 6 November 1941 (age 83); Skara, Sweden

Sport
- Sport: Speed skating
- Club: Telge SK, Södertälje

Göran Johansson (born 6 November 1941) is a Swedish speed skater. He finished 15th in the 1500 m event at the 1972 Winter Olympics. At the European championships he placed 14–15th in 1971 and 1972.
