= Kiyomi Ito (speed skater) =

Japanese speed skater (born 1949)

Personal information
- Nationality: Japanese
- Born: 30 October 1949 (age 75); Fukuoka, Japan

Sport
- Sport: Speed skating

Kiyomi Ito (born 30 October 1949) is a Japanese speed skater. He competed in three events at the 1972 Winter Olympics.
