= Ard Schenk =

Dutch speed skater

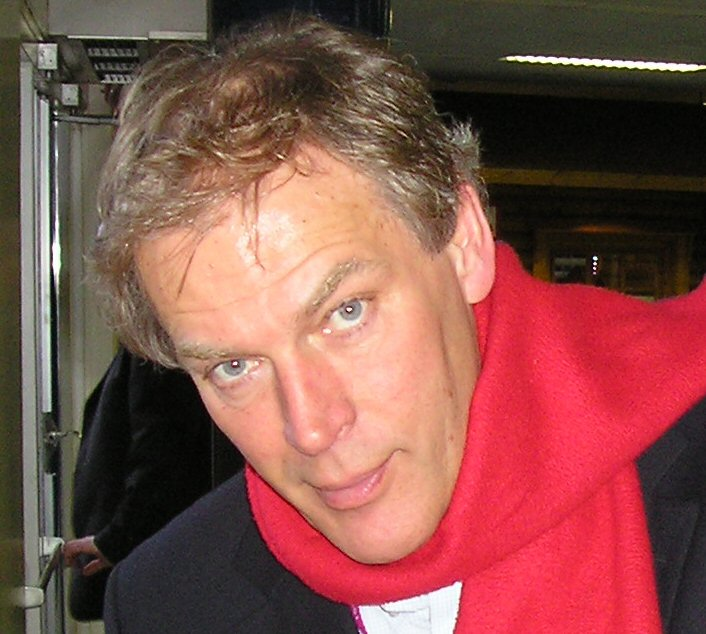
- Ard Schenk during World Cup competitions in the Thialf in Heerenveen, Netherlands in March 2006

Personal information
- Full name: Adrianus Schenk
- Nationality: Dutch
- Born: 16 September 1944 (age 82) Anna Paulowna, Netherlands
- Height: 1.90 m (6 ft 3 in)
- Weight: 90 kg (198 lb)

Sport
- Country: Netherlands
- Sport: Speed skating
- Turned pro: 1973
- Retired: 1974

Achievements and titles
- Personal bests: 500 m: 39.8 (1971); 1000 m: 1:20.6 (1968); 1500 m: 2:05.3 (1966); 3000 m: 4:08.3 (1972); 5000 m: 7:09.8 (1972); 10 000 m: 14:55.9 (1971)
Medal record
Men's speed skating
Representing the Netherlands
Olympic Games
Gold medal – first place	1972 Sapporo	1500 m
Gold medal – first place	1972 Sapporo	5000 m
Gold medal – first place	1972 Sapporo	10000 m
Silver medal – second place	1968 Grenoble	1500 m
World Allround Championships
Gold medal – first place	1970 Oslo	Allround
Gold medal – first place	1971 Gothenburg	Allround
Gold medal – first place	1972 Oslo	Allround
Silver medal – second place	1966 Gothenburg	Allround
Silver medal – second place	1967 Oslo	Allround
Bronze medal – third place	1965 Oslo	Allround
Bronze medal – third place	1968 Gothenburg	Allround
World Sprint Championships
Bronze medal – third place	1971 Inzell	Sprint
Bronze medal – third place	1972 Eskilstuna	Sprint
European Allround Championships
Gold medal – first place	1966 Deventer	Allround
Gold medal – first place	1970 Innsbruck	Allround
Gold medal – first place	1972 Davos	Allround
Silver medal – second place	1971 Heerenveen	Allround

Adrianus "Ard" Schenk (born 16 September 1944) is a former speed skater from the Netherlands. His first Olympic success came in 1968, when he won a silver medal at the Winter Olympics. Between 1970 and the 1972 Winter Olympics, Schenk won three consecutive World Allround Speed Skating Championships. He won three gold medals at the 1972 Winter Olympics, becoming, along with Galina Kulakova of the Soviet Union, the most successful athlete there.

== Biography ==
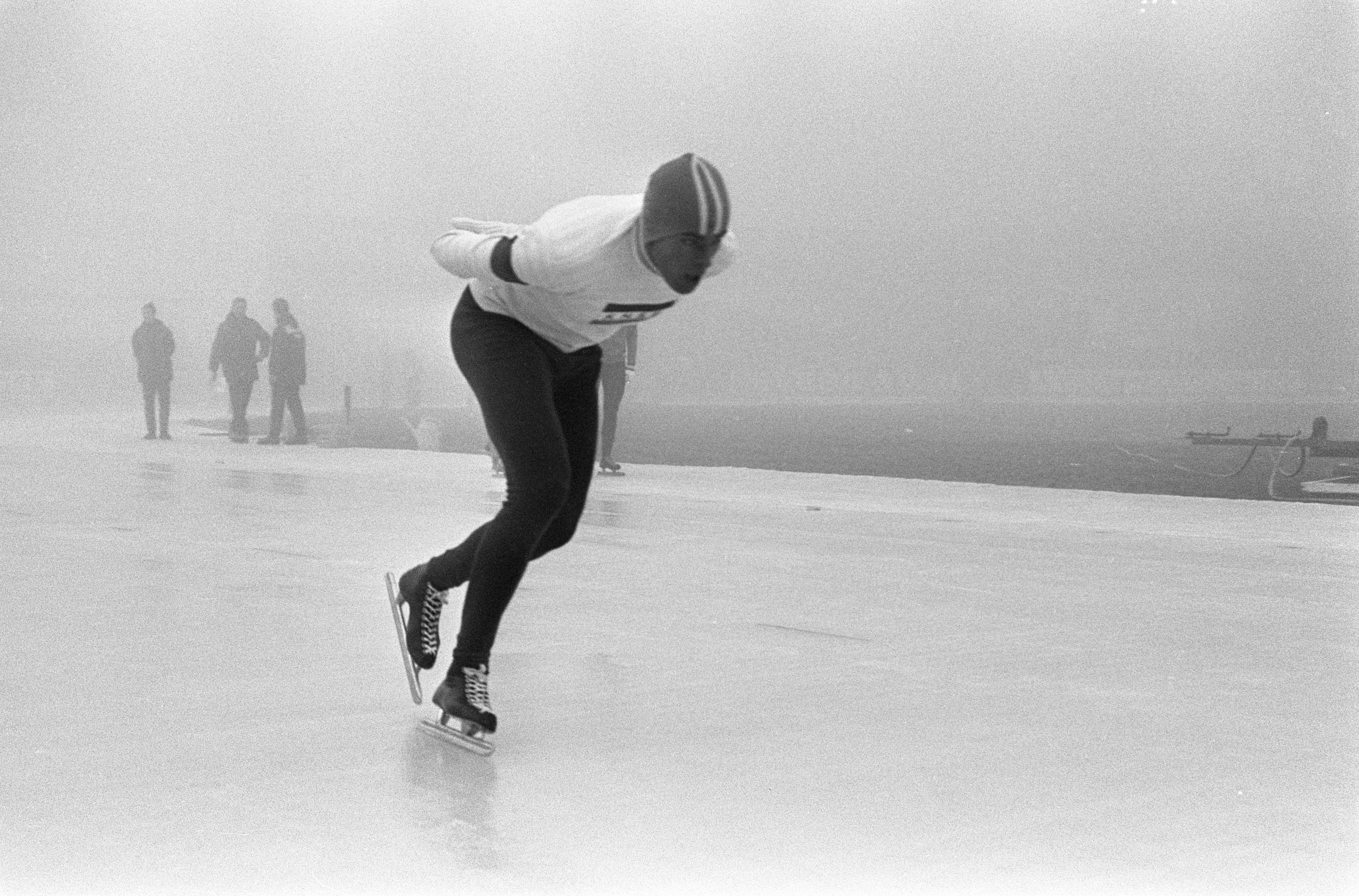
Schenk (1965)

Schenk competed in international meets from 1964 on, winning his first medal at the 1965 World Championships and his first gold medal at the 1966 European Championships. He won three gold medals at the Olympic Games in Sapporo (a fall in the 500 m precluded gold in all four distances). That same year, he also won the European Allround and the World Allround Championships. He became World Allround Champion by winning all four distances, a feat that nobody had achieved since Ivar Ballangrud 40 years earlier, and which only Eric Heiden has repeated since (in 1979). Finally, he won bronze that year at the World Sprint Championships.

The next season (1973), he turned professional with a number of other prominent speed skaters, thereby forgoing the opportunity of winning more championships. The professional circuit lasted two seasons and Schenk retired from speed skating at 30. Schenk also won five of the six 1000 meter races at World Sprint Championship he participated in.

== Records ==
=== World records ===
Schenk was the first to skate the 10,000 meters within 15 minutes, and the first skater to finish the 1500 meters in less than 2 minutes. Over the course of his career he broke a total of 18 (senior) world records, a feat no skater before or after him has bettered. Among men, the sprint specialist Jeremy Wotherspoon came closest with his 16th world record in 2007, while among women long-distance specialist Gunda Niemann equalled Schenk's mark in 2001. By March 1971, Schenk held 6 of the 7 official world records at the same time, missing only the 500 m. His 1000 m record was broken in March 1972 by Erhard Keller, but the other five stood until 1975 to 1978, when world records started to be skated at the high-altitude rink of Medeo.

Discipline	Time	Date	Location
1500 m	2:06.2	26 January 1966	Davos
3000 m	4:26.2	29 January 1966	Inzell
1500 m	2:05.3	30 January 1966	Inzell
3000 m	4:18.4	25 February 1967	Inzell
1000 m	1:20.6	28 February 1967	Inzell
1000 m	1:20.6	5 February 1968	Davos
3000 m	4:12.6	15 January 1971	Davos
1500 m	1:58.7	16 January 1971	Davos
Big combination	171.317	31 January 1971	Oslo
10000 m	15:01.6	14 February 1971	Gothenburg
Big combination	171.130	14 February 1971	Gothenburg
1000 m	1:18.8	20 February 1971	Inzell
5000 m	7:12.0	13 March 1971	Inzell
10000 m	14:55.9	14 March 1971	Inzell
Big combination	168.248	14 March 1971	Inzell
3000 m	4:08.3	2 March 1972	Inzell
5000 m	7:09.8	4 March 1972	Inzell
Big combination	167.420	5 March 1972	Inzell

Source: SpeedSkatingStats.com

== Personal records ==
Personal records
Men's speed skating
Event	Result	Date	Location	Notes
500 meter	38.9	15 January 1971	Davos	
1000 meter	1:18.8	20 February 1971	Inzell	
1500 meter	1:58.7	16 January 1971	Davos	
3000 meter	4:08.3	2 March 1972	Inzell	
5000 meter	7:09.8	4 March 1972	Inzell	
10000 meter	14:55.9	14 March 1971	Inzell	
Big combination	167.420	5 March 1972	Inzell	

Schenk has an Adelskalender score of 166.241 points. He was number one on the Adelskalender from 13 January 1966 until 27 February 1967 and again from 13 February 1971 until 19 March 1976 for a total of 6 years and 58 days. The Adelskalender is an all-time allround speed skating ranking.

== Tournament overview ==
Season	Dutch Championships Allround	ISU European Championships Allround	Olympic Games	ISU* World Championships Allround	ISU World Championships Sprint	ISSL* European Championships Allround	ISSL World Championships Allround
1963–1964	DEVENTER (silver) 500m 5th 5000m (silver) 1500m 9th 10000m (silver) overall		INNSBRUCK 13th 1500m	HELSINKI 9th 500m 15th 5000m 11th 1500m 13th 10000m 7th overall			
1964–1965	AMSTERDAM (gold) 500m (silver) 5000m (silver) 1500m (gold) 10000m (gold) overall	GOTHENBURG (gold) 500m 12th 5000m 10th 1500m 6th 10000m 5th overall		OSLO 6th 500m 10th 5000m (silver) 1500m 6th 10000m (bronze) overall			
1965–1966	DEVENTER (gold) 500m (silver) 5000m (gold) 1500m (silver) 10000m (silver) overall	DEVENTER 4th 500m (gold) 5000m (gold) 1500m 4th 10000m (gold) overall		GOTHENBURG (bronze) 500m (bronze) 5000m 5th 1500m 4th 10000m (silver) overall			
1966–1967	AMSTERDAM (gold) 500m (bronze) 5000m 4th 1500m (silver) 10000m (silver) overall	LAHTI 32nd 500m (silver) 5000m 10th 1500m 4th 10000m 15th overall		OSLO (bronze) 500m (bronze) 5000m (gold) 1500m 4th 10000m (silver) overall			
1967–1968	AMSTERDAM (gold) 500m (gold) 5000m (gold) 1500m 5th 10000m (gold) overall	OSLO 4th 500m 7th 5000m 10th 1500m 8th 10000m 6th overall	GRENOBLE 13th 500m (silver) 1500m	GOTHENBURG (bronze) 500m 8th 5000m (silver) 1500m 8th 10000m (bronze) overall			
1968–1969	HEERENVEEN (gold) 500m (bronze) 5000m 5th 1500m 5th 10000m (bronze) overall	INZELL 6th 500m 4th 5000m 5th 1500m 13th 10000m 4th overall		DEVENTER 9th 500m (bronze) 5000m 28th 1500m 8th 10000m 13th overall			
1969–1970	DEVENTER (gold) 500m (bronze) 5000m (gold) 1500m (silver) 10000m (gold) overall	INNSBRUCK 4th 500m (bronze) 5000m (gold) 1500m 5th 10000m (gold) overall		OSLO (bronze) 500m (bronze) 5000m (gold) 1500m 4th 10000m (gold) overall	WEST ALLIS 16th 500m (silver) 1000m 19th 500m (gold) 1000m 6th overall		
1970–1971	AMSTERDAM (gold) 500m (gold) 5000m (gold) 1500m 5th 10000m (silver) overall	HEERENVEEN (gold) 500m 11th 5000m (silver) 1500m 3rd 10000m (silver) overall		GOTHENBURG (bronze) 500m (gold) 5000m (gold) 1500m (gold) 10000m (gold) overall	INZELL 10th 500m (gold) 1000m 11th 500m (gold) 1000m (bronze) overall		
1971–1972		DAVOS (gold) 500m (gold) 5000m (gold) 1500m 5th 10000m (gold) overall	SAPPORO 34th 500m (gold) 1500m (gold) 5000m (gold) 10000m	OSLO (gold) 500m (gold) 5000m (gold) 1500m (gold) 10000m (gold) overall	ESKILSTUNA 16th 500m (gold) 1000m 16th 500m (gold) 1000m (bronze) overall		
1972–1973						SKIEN (bronze) 500m (gold) 5000m (gold) 1500m (silver) 10000m (gold) overall	GOTHENBURG (silver) 500m (gold) 5000m (gold) 1500m (gold) 10000m (gold) overall
1973–1974						TYNSET 4th 500m 8th 5000m 7th 1500m 6th 10000m 6th overall	

- ISSL = International Speed Skating League
- ISU = International Skating Union

== Medals won ==
Championship	Gold (gold)	Silver (silver)	Bronze (bronze)
Dutch Allround	3	4	1
European Allround	3	1	0
Olympic Games	3	1	0
World Allround	3	2	2
World Sprint	0	0	2
ISSL European Allround	1	0	0
ISSL World Allround	1	0	0

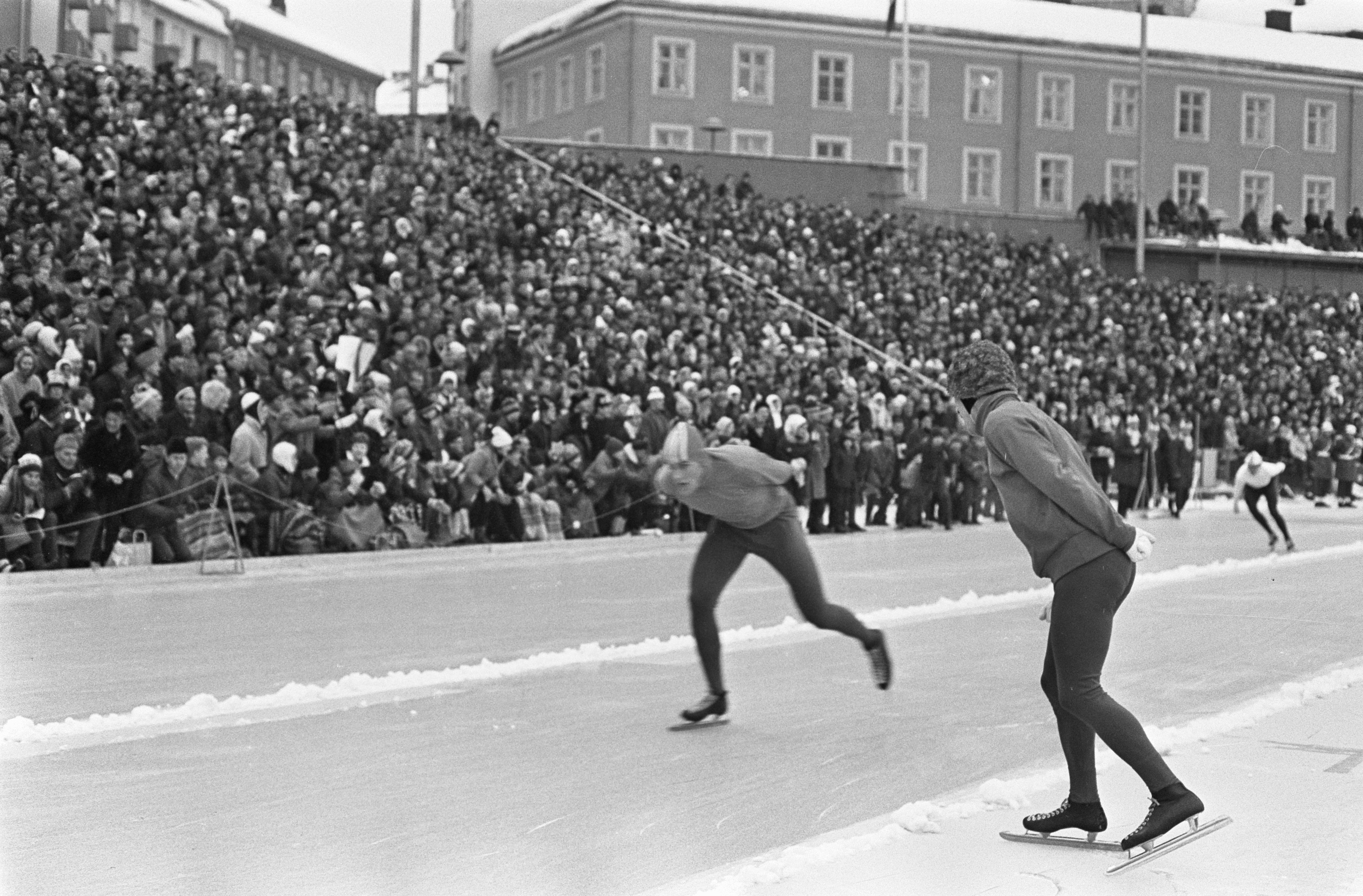
Schenk (Oslo, 1967)

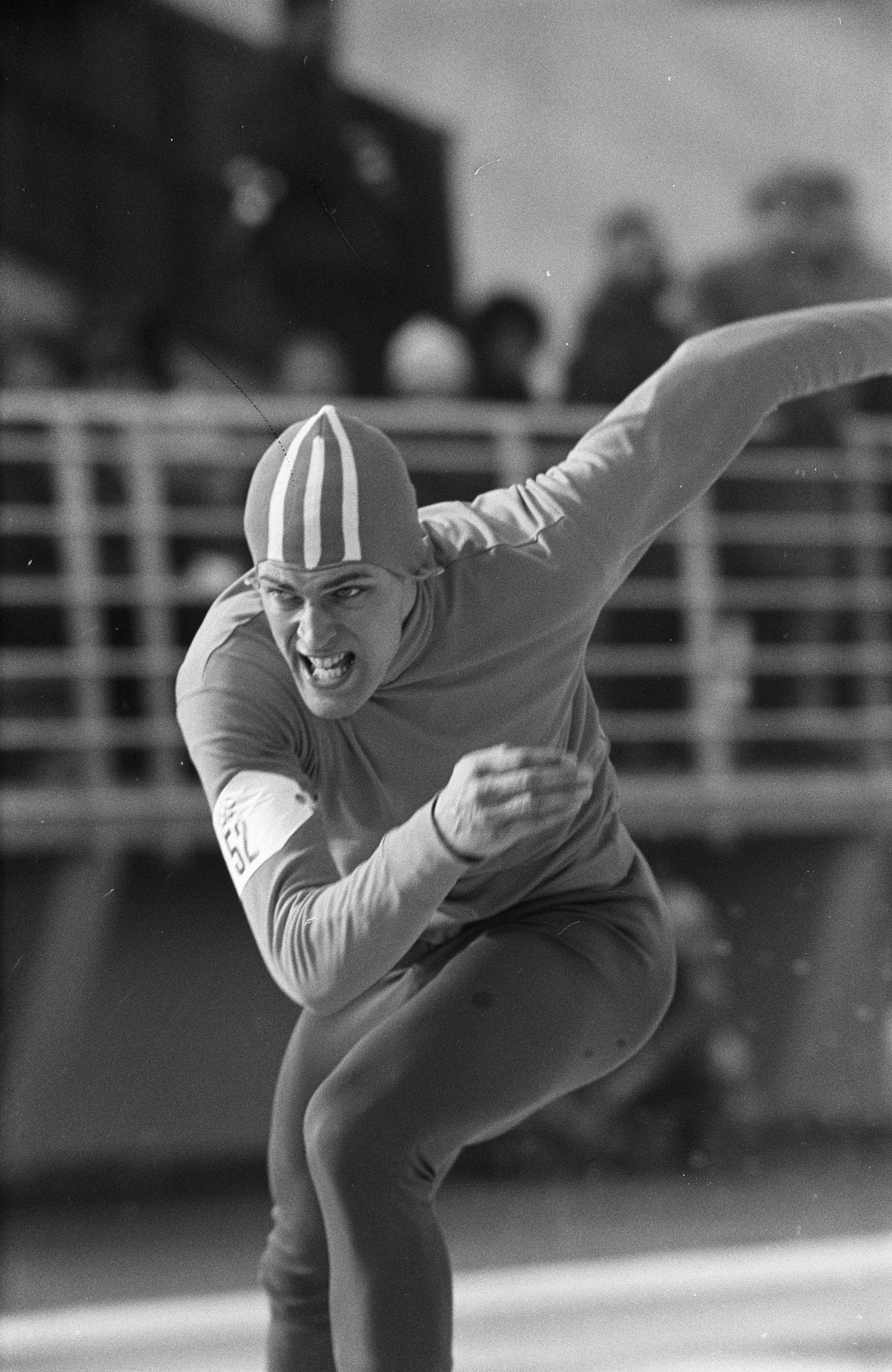
Schenk (Grenoble, 1968)

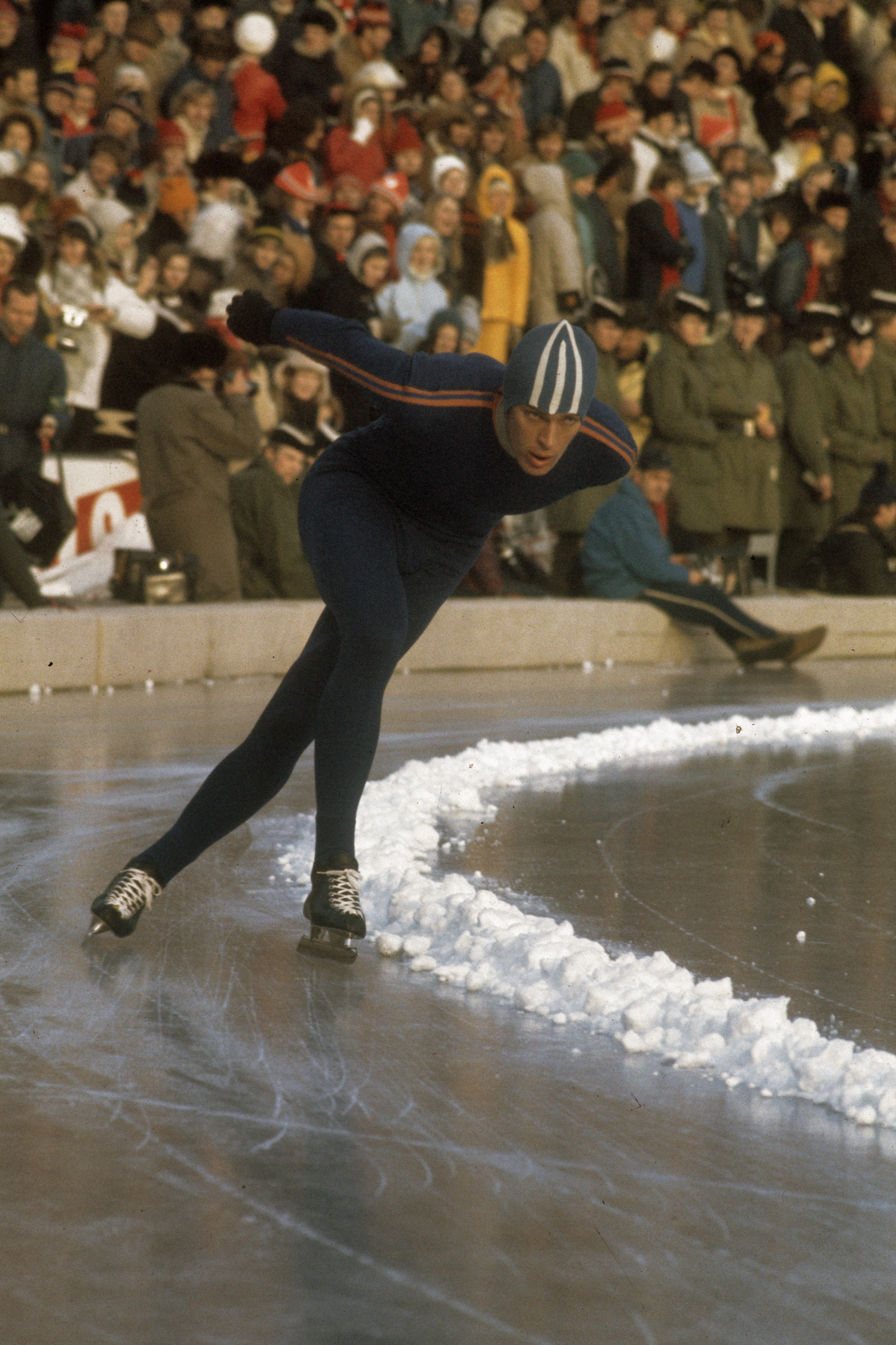
Schenk (Oslo, 1972)

== See also ==
- List of multiple Olympic gold medalists at a single Games

Awards
Preceded by (Netherlands) Anton Geesink	Dutch Sportsman of the Year with Kees Verkerk; 1966	Succeeded by (Netherlands) Kees Verkerk
Preceded by (Netherlands) Tom Okker	Dutch Sportsman of the Year; 1970 to 1972	Succeeded by (Netherlands) Johan Cruijff
Preceded by (Norway) Dag Fornæss	Oscar Mathisen Award; 1970–1972	Succeeded by (Sweden) Göran Claeson
Olympic Games
Preceded by Kees Broekman	Flagbearer for Netherlands; 1964 Innsbruck	Succeeded by Stien Kaiser
