= Giancarlo Gloder =

Italian speed skater

Personal information
- Nationality: Italian
- Born: 10 May 1945 (age 79); Gallio, Italy

Sport
- Sport: Speed skating

Giancarlo Gloder (born 10 May 1945) is an Italian speed skater. He competed at the 1968 Winter Olympics and the 1972 Winter Olympics.
