= Jappie van Dijk =

Dutch speed skater

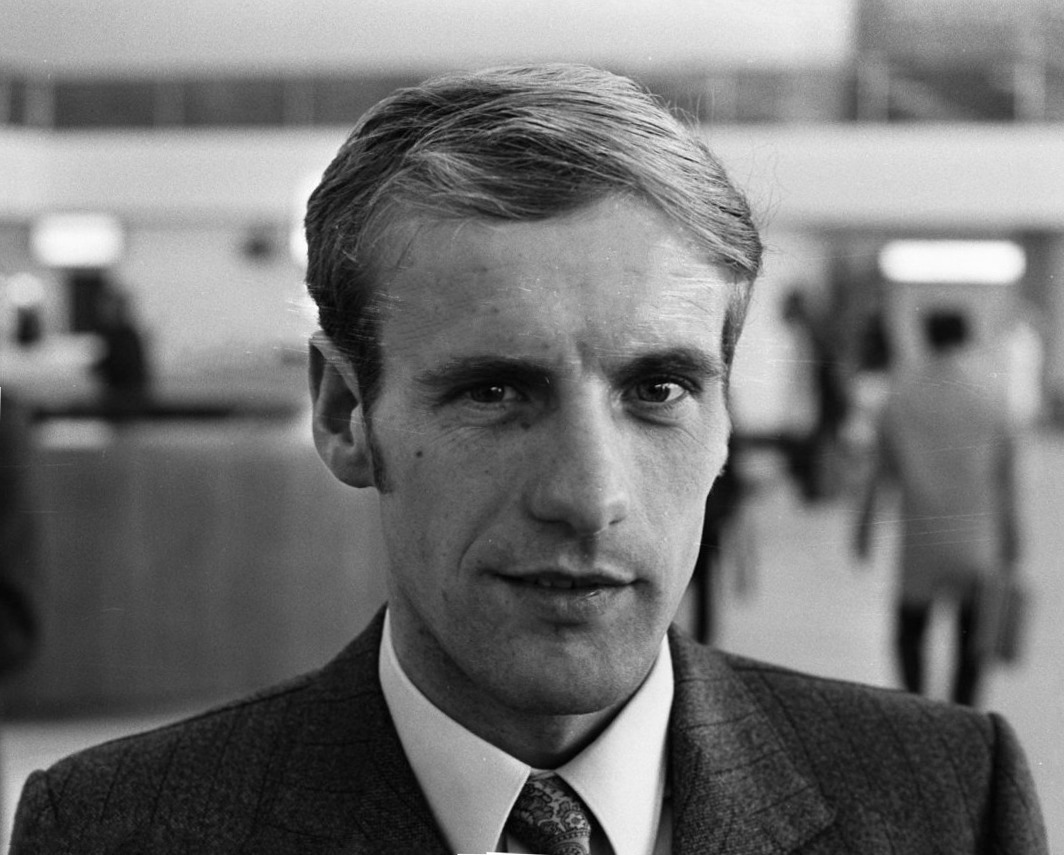
- Jappie van Dijk in 1970

Personal information
- Born: 29 September 1944 (age 81) Ruigahuizen, Netherlands
- Height: 1.75 m (5 ft 9 in)
- Weight: 66 kg (146 lb)

Sport
- Sport: Speed skating

Jacobus "Jappie" van Dijk (born 29 September 1944) is a former speed skater from the Netherlands. He competed at the 1972 Winter Olympics in the 500 m and finished in 32nd place. A year later he won the national allround title.

== Personal records ==
Personal records
Men's speed skating
Event	Result	Date	Location	Notes
500 meter	41.00	4 March 1972	Inzell	
1000 meter	1:24.85	19 November 1972	Inzell	
1500 meter	2:02.50	15 January 1972	Davos	
3000 meter	4:17.00	19 January 1973	Davos	
5000 meter	7:16.90	4 March 1972	Inzell	
10000 meter	15:32.12	27 January 1973	Grenoble	

== Tournament overview ==
Season	Dutch Championships Allround	European Championships Allround	World Championships Allround	Olympic Games	ISSL European Championships Allround
1967–68	AMSTERDAM 22nd 500m 13th 5000m 18th 1500m 4th 10000m 14th overall				
1968–69	HEERENVEEN 19th 500m 5th 5000m 9th 1500m 6th 10000m 9th overall				
1969–70	DEVENTER 13th 500m (silver) 5000m (silver) 1500m (bronze) 10000m (bronze)		OSLO 26th 500m 12th 5000m 17th 1500m 11th 10000m 16th overall		
1970–71	AMSTERDAM 9th 500m (bronze) 5000m 6th 1500m 4th 10000m 7th overall				
1971–72	DEVENTER 12th 500m 5th 5000m 8th 1500m 5th 10000m 5th overall		OSLO 23rd 500m 11th 5000m 12th 1500m 8th10000m 14th overall	SAPPORO 32nd 500m	
1972–73	HEERENVEEN 9th 500m (gold) 5000m 4th 1500m (gold) 10000m (gold) overall	GRENOBLE 23rd 500m (gold) 5000m 8th 1500m (gold) 10000m 6th overall	DEVENTER 13th 500m 7th 5000m 7th 1500m 7th 10000m 6th overall		
1973–74					TYNSET 7th 500m (bronze) 5000m 5th 1500m (silver) 10000m 4th overall
1975–76	GRONINGEN 10th 500m 9th 5000m 7th 1500m 10th 10000m 7th overall				

- ISSL = International Speed Skating League
