= Kevin Sirois =

Canadian speed skater

Personal information
- Born: 20 April 1949; Edmonton, Alberta, Canada
- Died: 14 May 1972 (aged 23); Ponoka, Alberta, Canada

Sport
- Sport: Speed skating

Kevin Sirois (20 April 1949 – 14 May 1972) was a Canadian speed skater. He competed in three events at the 1972 Winter Olympics. He was killed in a cycling accident.
