= Makomanai Open Stadium =

Stadium in Sapporo, Japan

Makomanai Sekisui Heim Stadium
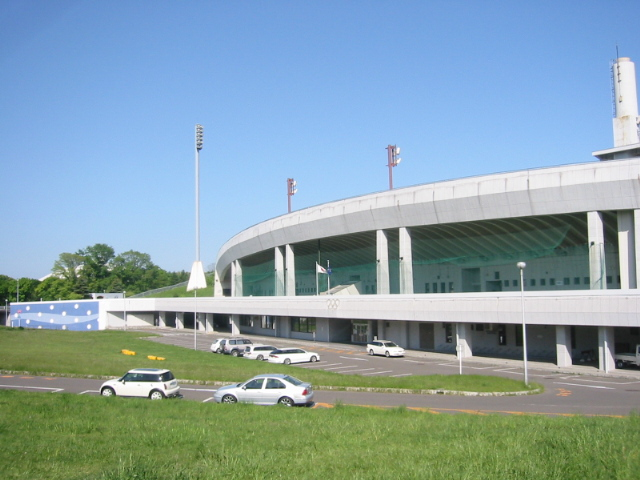
- Interactive map of Makomanai Sekisui Heim Stadium
- Former names: Makomanai Open Stadium (1971–2007)
- Location: Sapporo, Japan
- Coordinates: 42°59′47″N 141°20′35″E
- Operator: Hokkaido Sports Association
- Capacity: 17,324

Construction
- Groundbreaking: 1970
- Opened: February 1971

The Makomanai Sekisui Heim Stadium is a multi-purpose stadium in Sapporo, Japan. During the 1972 Winter Olympics, it hosted the opening ceremonies and the speed skating events. Located inside the Makomanai Park, the stadium holds 17,324 people.

Currently the stadium holds the speed skating Winter Annual National Competition, and until 2011 the Toyota Big Air snowboarding contest.

During summer it is used as tennis courts (up to eight at the same time) or futsal fields (up to two at the same time).

As of 2021, the Olympic cauldron is still seemingly mounted on the original 1972 plinth, just within the stadium's south east perimeter.

== Access ==
- Namboku Line: 25 minutes walking distance from Makomanai Station.
