= David Hampton (speed skater) =

British speed skater

Personal information
- Nationality: British
- Born: 16 December 1947 (age 78)
- Height: 178 cm (5 ft 10 in)

Sport
- Sport: Speed skating

David Hampton (born 16 December 1947) is a British speed skater. He competed in four events at the 1972 Winter Olympics.
