= Dag Fornæss =

Norwegian speed skater (born 1948)

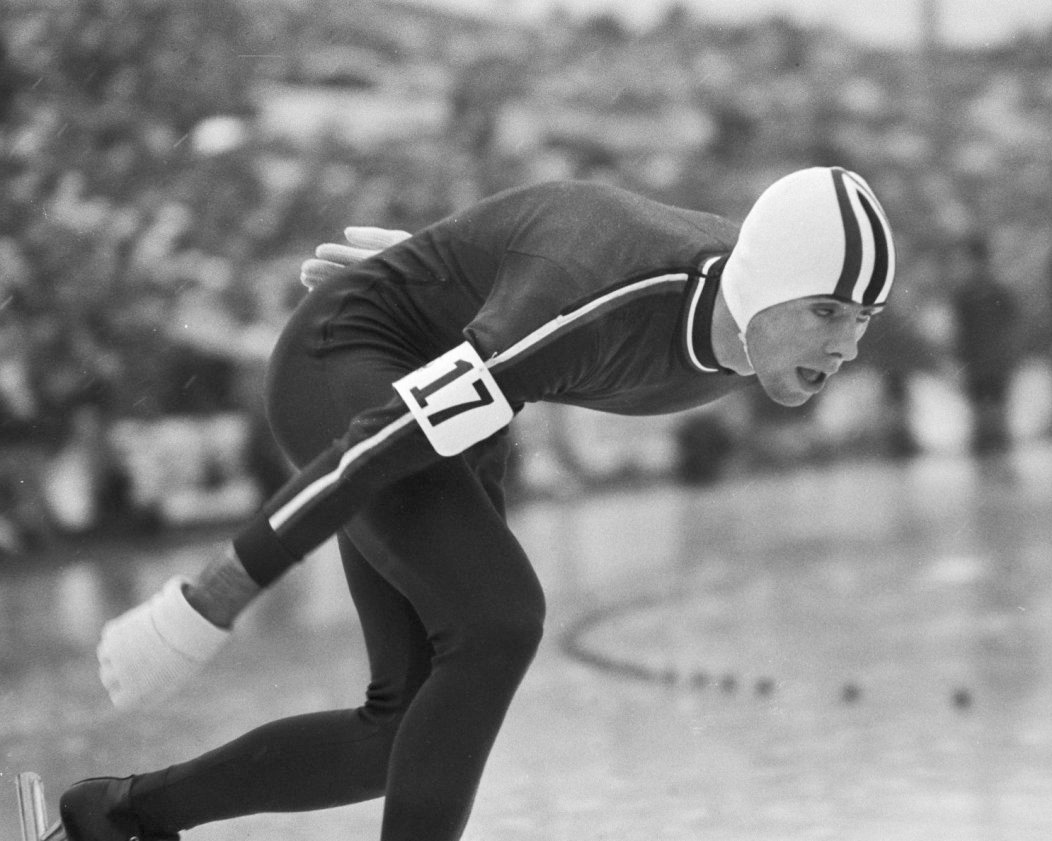
- Dag Fornæss in 1971

Personal information
- Born: 30 June 1948 (age 78) Hamar, Norway
- Height: 1.78 m (5 ft 10 in)
- Weight: 64 kg (141 lb)

Sport
- Sport: Speed skating
- Club: Hamar IL

Dag Fornæss (born 30 June 1948) is a former speed skater from Norway who won the Norwegian, European, and World Allround Championships in 1969. He was born in Hamar.

== Biography ==
Representing Hamar Idrettslag (Hamar Sports Club), Fornæss had his international breakthrough in 1969, when he won the Norwegian Allround Championships, the European Allround Championships, and the World Allround Championships. That same year, he also skated a new world record on the 3,000 m. For his accomplishments that year, Fornæss received the Oscar Mathisen Award and was chosen Norwegian Sportsperson of the Year.

He became European Allround Champion again in 1971. Fornæss participated in his last international event at the 1972 Winter Olympic Games, after which he ended his skating career.

Fornæss also was a successful association football player, playing in the Norwegian Premier League for the club Skeid Fotball in 1972. His grandfather, Embret Skogen, was an Olympic shooter.

== Medals ==
An overview of medals won by Fornæss at important championships he participated in, listing the years in which he won each:

Championships	Gold medal	Silver medal	Bronze medal
Winter Olympics	–	–	–
World Allround	1969	–	–
World Sprint	–	–	–
European Allround	1969; 1971	1970	–
Norwegian Allround	1969; 1970; 1971	1972	–
Norwegian Sprint	–	1970	–

== Records ==
=== World record ===
Fornæss successively broke the 3,000 m record twice. world record:

Discipline	Time	Date	Location
3000 m	4.17,4	January 28, 1969	Cortina d'Ampezzo

Source: SpeedSkatingStats.com

=== Personal records ===
To put these personal records in perspective, the column WR lists the official world records on the dates that Fornæss skated his personal records.

Event	Result	Date	Venue	WR
500 m	39.1	15 January 1972	Davos	38.0
1,000 m	1:20.6	3 March 1971	Notodden	1:18.8
1,500 m	2:01.98	23 January 1972	Davos	1:58.7
3,000 m	4:17.4	28 January 1969	Cortina d'Ampezzo	4:17.5
5,000 m	7:20.6	4 March 1972	Inzell	7:12.0
10,000 m	15:23.8	2 March 1969	Inzell	15:03.6
Big combination	171.752	23 January 1972	Davos	168.248

Fornæss has an Adelskalender score of 170.010 points. His highest ranking on the Adelskalender was a 3rd place.

Awards
Preceded by (Norway) Fred Anton Maier	Oscar Mathisen Award; 1969	Succeeded by (Netherlands) Ard Schenk
Preceded by (Norway) Fred Anton Maier	Norwegian Sportsperson of the Year; 1969	Succeeded by (Norway) Stig Berge
