= John Blewitt =

British speed skater

Personal information
- Full name: John Barry Blewitt
- Nationality: British
- Born: 19 December 1945 (age 79); Richmond, England

Sport
- Sport: Speed skating

John Barry Blewitt (born 19 December 1945) is a British speed skater. He competed at the 1968 Winter Olympics and the 1972 Winter Olympics.
