= Jouko Salakka =

Finnish speed skater

Personal information
- Nationality: Finnish
- Born: 10 August 1951 (age 73); Somero, Finland

Sport
- Sport: Speed skating

Jouko Salakka (born 10 August 1951) is a Finnish speed skater. He competed in four events at the 1972 Winter Olympics.
