= Göran Claeson =

Swedish speed skater (born 1945)

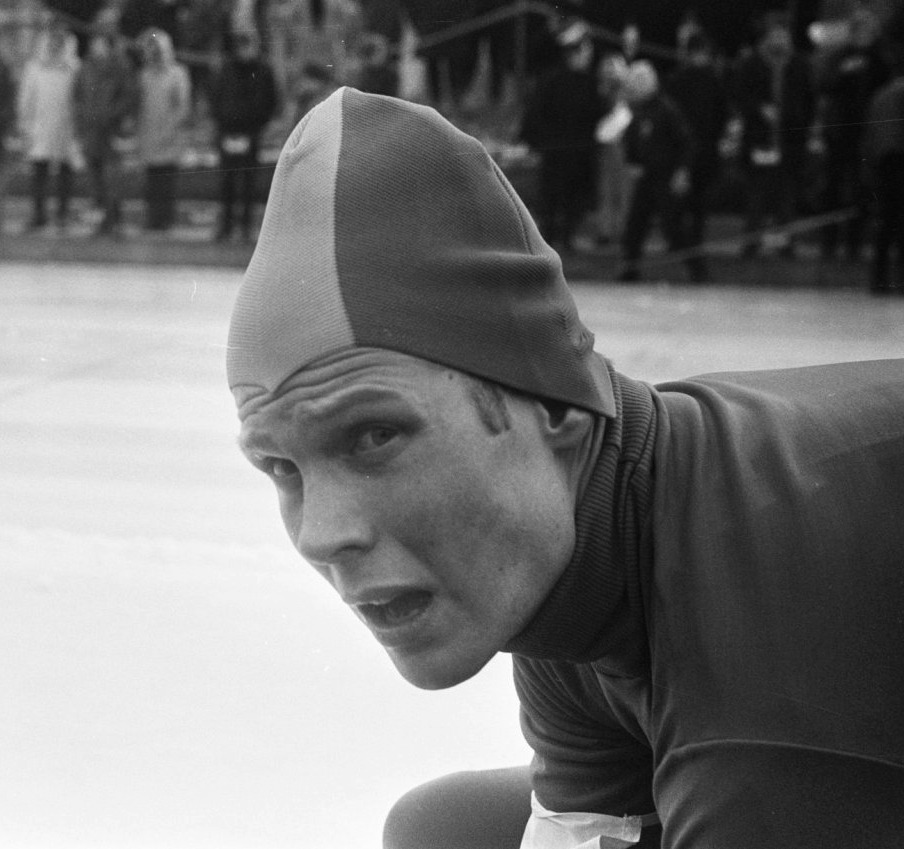
- Göran Claeson in 1970

Personal information
- Full name: Rolf Göran Claeson
- Born: 4 March 1945 (age 81) Älvsjö, Sweden
- Height: 1.91 m (6 ft 3 in)
- Weight: 82 kg (181 lb)

Sport
- Sport: Speed skating
- Club: Södermalms IK, Bromma
Medal record
Men's speed skating
Representing Sweden
Olympic Games
Bronze medal – third place	1972 Sapporo	1,500 m

Rolf Göran Claeson (born 4 March 1945) is a former speed skater from Sweden.

Claeson participated in the 1,500 m at the 1968 Winter Olympics of Grenoble, but finished only 20th. In 1969, at the first European Allround Championships in which Claeson participated, he won bronze. Three weeks later, at the first World Allround Championships in which he participated, he won silver. More international medals followed during the next few years, but none of them were gold. Then, after the 1971–1972 season, two of the world's top skaters, Ard Schenk and Kees Verkerk, joined a newly formed professional league. Another top skater, Dag Fornæss, retired from speed skating. The following season, Claeson promptly became both European and World Allround Champion.

Claeson won several more medals, including a bronze medal on the 1,500 m at the 1972 Winter Olympics of Sapporo. In 1975, he entered the European Allround Championships as the reigning European Champion, but he finished only 11th. He retired from speed skating that same year.

== Medals ==
Claeson WC 1973 (Polygoon Film)

An overview of medals won by Claeson at important championships he participated in, listing the years in which he won each:

Championships	Gold medal	Silver medal	Bronze medal
Winter Olympics	–	–	1972 (1,500 m)
World Allround	1973	1969; 1971	1974
World Sprint	–	–	–
European Allround	1973; 1974	–	1969; 1970

In addition, Claeson won a total of 25 Swedish National Championships titles:

- Swedish Championships 1,500 m: 1969, 1970, 1971, 1973, 1974, and 1975.
- Swedish Championships 5,000 m: 1969, 1970, 1971, 1972, 1973, 1974, and 1975.
- Swedish Championships 10,000 m: 1970, 1971, 1972, 1973, and 1974.
- Swedish Championships Allround: 1969, 1970, 1971, 1972, 1973, 1974, and 1975.

== Records ==
=== World record ===
Over the course of his career, Claeson skated one world record:

Discipline	Time	Date	Location
Big combination	171.758	2 March 1969	Inzell

Source: SpeedSkatingStats.com

== Personal records ==
To put these personal records in perspective, the column WR lists the official world records on the dates that Claeson skated his personal records.

Event	Result	Date	Venue	WR
500 m	39.2	15 January 1972	Davos	38.0
1,000 m	1:20.2	3 March 1971	Notodden	1:18.8
1,500 m	2:00.1	17 January 1971	Inzell	1:58.7
3,000 m	4:17.47	10 January 1973	Misurina	4:08.3
5,000 m	7:17.0	1 March 1969	Inzell	7:16.7
10,000 m	15:18.7	14 February 1971	Gothenburg	15:03.6
Big combination	171.758	2 March 1969	Inzell	172.058

Claeson has an Adelskalender score of 168.868 points. His highest ranking on the Adelskalender was a second place.

Awards
Preceded by (Netherlands) Ard Schenk	Oscar Mathisen Award; 1973	Succeeded by (Norway) Sten Stensen
