= Valery Lavrushkin =

Soviet speed skater

Personal information
- Nationality: Soviet
- Born: 17 March 1945 (age 80); Tula, Russian SFSR, Soviet Union

Sport
- Sport: Speed skating

Valery Lavrushkin (born 17 March 1945) is a Soviet speed skater. He competed at the 1968 Winter Olympics and the 1972 Winter Olympics.
