= Dan Carroll =

American speed skater

Personal information
- Born: December 17, 1949 (age 76) St. Louis, Missouri, United States

Sport
- Sport: Speed skating

Dan Carroll (born December 17, 1949) is an American speed skater. He competed at the 1972 Winter Olympics and the 1976 Winter Olympics.
