= Kimmo Koskinen =

Finnish speed skater

Personal information
- Nationality: Finnish
- Born: 11 March 1948 (age 77); Tampere, Finland

Sport
- Sport: Speed skating

Kimmo Koskinen (born 11 March 1948) is a Finnish speed skater. He competed at the 1968 Winter Olympics and the 1972 Winter Olympics.
