= Speed skating at the 1972 Winter Olympics =

Speed skating at the XI Olympic Winter Games
- Pictogram for speed skating
- Venue: Makomanai Open Stadium
- Date: 4–12 February 1972
- No. of events: 8
- Competitors: 118 from 18 nations

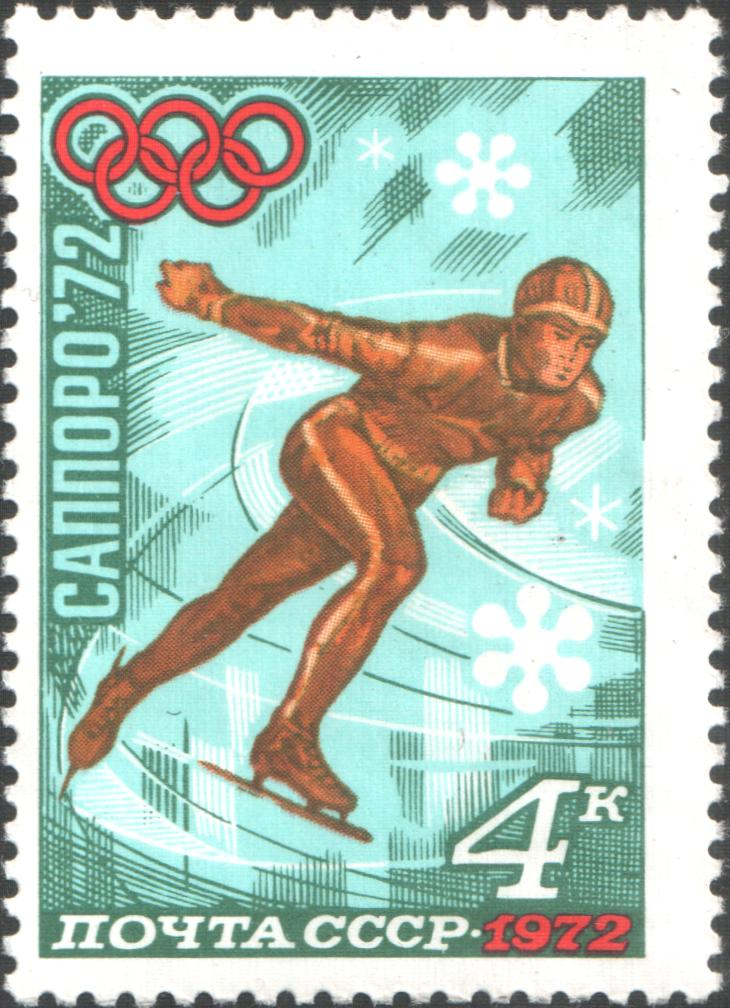
1972 Russian 4 kopeks stamp. Olympic Winter Games Sapporo.

Speed skating at the 1972 Winter Olympics, was held from 4 to 12 February. Eight events were contested at Makomanai Open Stadium in Sapporo, Japan. This was the first Olympics at which electronic times were recorded to the hundredth of a second.

== Medal summary ==
=== Medal table ===
Rank	Nation	Gold	Silver	Bronze	Total
1	Netherlands	4	3	2	9
2	United States	2	1	1	4
3	West Germany	2	0	0	2
4	Norway	0	2	2	4
5	Soviet Union	0	1	2	3
6	Sweden	0	1	1	2
Totals (6 entries)		8	8	8	24

The Netherlands topped the medal table, with four golds and nine overall, led by Ard Schenk's three gold medals.

Schenk led the individual medal table, winning each of the three longer distance events. The most successful female skater was the Netherlands's Stien Kaiser, who won one gold and one silver medal.

=== Men's events ===
Event	Gold		Silver		Bronze	
500 metres	Erhard Keller; West Germany	39.44 (OR)	Hasse Börjes; Sweden	39.69	Valery Muratov; Soviet Union	39.80
1500 metres	Ard Schenk; Netherlands	2:02.96 (OR)	Roar Grønvold; Norway	2:04.26	Göran Claeson; Sweden	2:05.89
5000 metres	Ard Schenk; Netherlands	7:23.61	Roar Grønvold; Norway	7:28.18	Sten Stensen; Norway	7:33.39
10,000 metres	Ard Schenk; Netherlands	15:01.35 (OR)	Kees Verkerk; Netherlands	15:04.70	Sten Stensen; Norway	15:07.08

=== Women's events ===
Event	Gold		Silver		Bronze	
500 metres	Anne Henning; United States	43.33 (OR)	Vera Krasnova; Soviet Union	44.01	Lyudmila Titova; Soviet Union	44.45
1000 metres	Monika Pflug; West Germany	1:31.40 (OR)	Atje Keulen-Deelstra; Netherlands	1:31.61	Anne Henning; United States	1:31.62
1500 metres	Dianne Holum; United States	2:20.85 (OR)	Stien Kaiser; Netherlands	2:21.05	Atje Keulen-Deelstra; Netherlands	2:22.05
3000 metres	Stien Kaiser; Netherlands	4:52.14 (OR)	Dianne Holum; United States	4:58.67	Atje Keulen-Deelstra; Netherlands	4:59.91

== Records ==
Seven of the eight events had new Olympic records set, with only the men's 5000 metres record remaining unbroken.

Event	Date	Team	Time	OR	WR
Men's 500 metres	5 February	Erhard Keller (FRG)	39.44	OR	
Men's 1500 metres	6 February	Ard Schenk (NED)	2:02.96	OR	
Men's 10,000 metres	7 February	Ard Schenk (NED)	15:01.35	OR	
Women's 500 metres	10 February	Anne Henning (USA)	43.33	OR	
Women's 1000 metres	11 February	Monika Pflug (FRG)	1:31.40	OR	
Women's 1500 metres	9 February	Dianne Holum (USA)	2:20.85	OR	
Women's 3000 metres	12 February	Stien Kaiser (NED)	4:52.14	OR	

== Participating NOCs ==
Eighteen nations competed in the speed skating events at Sapporo.

- Australia (2)
- Austria (1)
- Canada (10)
- Finland (6)
- France (1)
- East Germany (2)
- West Germany (7)
- Great Britain (2)
- Italy (2)
- Japan (13)
- North Korea (6)
- South Korea (4)
- Mongolia (2)
- Netherlands (10)
- Norway (14)
- Soviet Union (9)
- Sweden (11)
- United States (11)
