= Richard Tourne =

French speed skater (born 1951)

Personal information
- Nationality: French
- Born: 14 January 1951 (age 74)

Sport
- Sport: Speed skating

Richard Tourne (born 14 January 1951) is a French speed skater. He competed at the 1972 Winter Olympics and the 1976 Winter Olympics.
