= Bruno Toniolli =

Italian speed skater

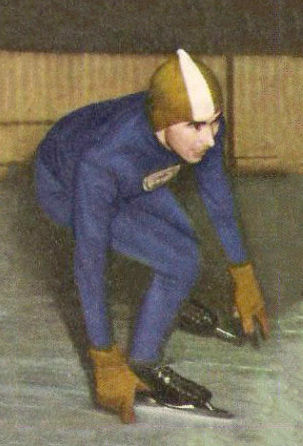

Personal information
- Born: 29 August 1943 (age 82) Bolzano, Italy
- Height: 1.76 m (5 ft 9 in)
- Weight: 67 kg (148 lb)

Sport
- Sport: Speed skating
- Event: 500-10000 m
- Club: G.S. Fiamme Oro, Moena

Achievements and titles
- Personal best(s): 500 m – 40.55 (1976); 1000 m – 1:20.63 (1976); 1500 m – 2:04.6 (1972); 5000 m – 7:41.2 (1971); 10000 m – 16:00.0 (1971)

Bruno Toniolli (born 29 August 1943) is a retired Italian speed skater who was active internationally between 1969 and 1976. He competed at the 1972 and 1976 Winter Olympics, with the best result of 14th place in the 1000 m in 1976.
