= Kees Verkerk =

Dutch speed skater

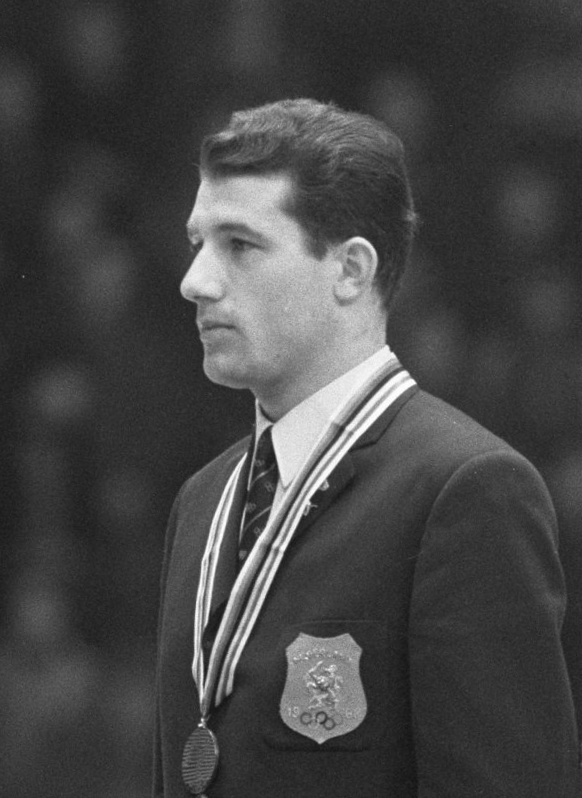
- Verkerk in 1968

Personal information
- Nationality: Dutch
- Born: Cornelis Arie Verkerk; 28 October 1942 (age 83) Maasdam, Netherlands
- Height: 1.71 m (5 ft 7 in)
- Weight: 71 kg (157 lb)

Sport
- Country: Netherlands
- Sport: Speed skating
- Club: Puttershoek
- Turned pro: 1964
- Retired: 1972

Achievements and titles
- Personal best(s): 500 m: 39.9 (1971); 1000 m: 1:21.4 (1971); 1500 m: 1:58.9 (1971); 3000 m: 4:14.9 (1972); 5000 m: 7:13.2 (1969); 10 000 m: 15:03.6 (1969)
Medal record
Men's speed skating
Representing Netherlands
Olympic Games
Gold medal – first place	1968 Grenoble	1500 m
Silver medal – second place	1964 Innsbruck	1500 m
Silver medal – second place	1968 Grenoble	5000 m
Silver medal – second place	1972 Sapporo	10,000 m
World Allround Championships
Gold medal – first place	1966 Gothenburg	Allround
Gold medal – first place	1967 Oslo	Allround
Bronze medal – third place	1969 Deventer	Allround
Bronze medal – third place	1970 Oslo	Allround
Bronze medal – third place	1971 Gothenburg	Allround
European Allround Championships
Silver medal – second place	1966 Deventer	Allround
Gold medal – first place	1967 Lahti	Allround
Silver medal – second place	1969 Inzell	Allround
Bronze medal – third place	1971 Heerenveen	Allround

Cornelis Arie "Kees" Verkerk (born 28 October 1942) is a former speed skater from the Netherlands.

== Short biography ==
Kees Verkerk was World Allround Champion in 1966 and 1967, and European Allround Champion in 1967. He won an Olympic gold medal on the 1,500 m in 1968 and a silver medal on the 5,000 m. Four years earlier (in 1964), he had won Olympic silver on the 1,500 m. In 1972, he won Olympic silver on the 10,000 m. Nationally, he won four Allround titles in 1966, 1967, 1969 and 1972. As a result of his performances, he received the Oscar Mathisen Award in 1966 and 1967, the first skater to win this award twice, although until 1967, skaters were not eligible to win it more than once.

In 1973, together with Ard Schenk and a dozen other skaters, Verkerk joined in a newly formed professional league, but this lasted only two years. The end of this professional league also marked the end of Verkerk's career as a speed skater. Later, he was coach of the Swedish team. Verkerk met his future Norwegian wife in 1972 and has lived in Norway since his speed skating career ended.

== World records ==
Over the course of his career, Verkerk skated eight world records:

Discipline	Result	Date	Location	Note
Big combination	178.058	12 February 1967	Oslo	World record until 14 January 1968
1500 m	2:03.9	26 February 1967	Inzell	World record until 5 February 1968
5000 m	7:26.6	26 February 1967	Inzell	World record until 7 January 1968
Big combination	172.058	10 March 1968	Inzell	World record until 2 March 1969
10000 m	15:03.6	26 January 1969	Inzell	World record until 14 February 1971
1500 m	2:02.0	9 February 1969	Davos	World record until 8 March 1970
5000 m	7:13.2	1 March 1969	Inzell	World record until 13 March 1971
1500 m	2:01.9	8 March 1970	Inzell	World record until 16 January 1971

Source: SpeedSkatingStats.com

== Personal records ==
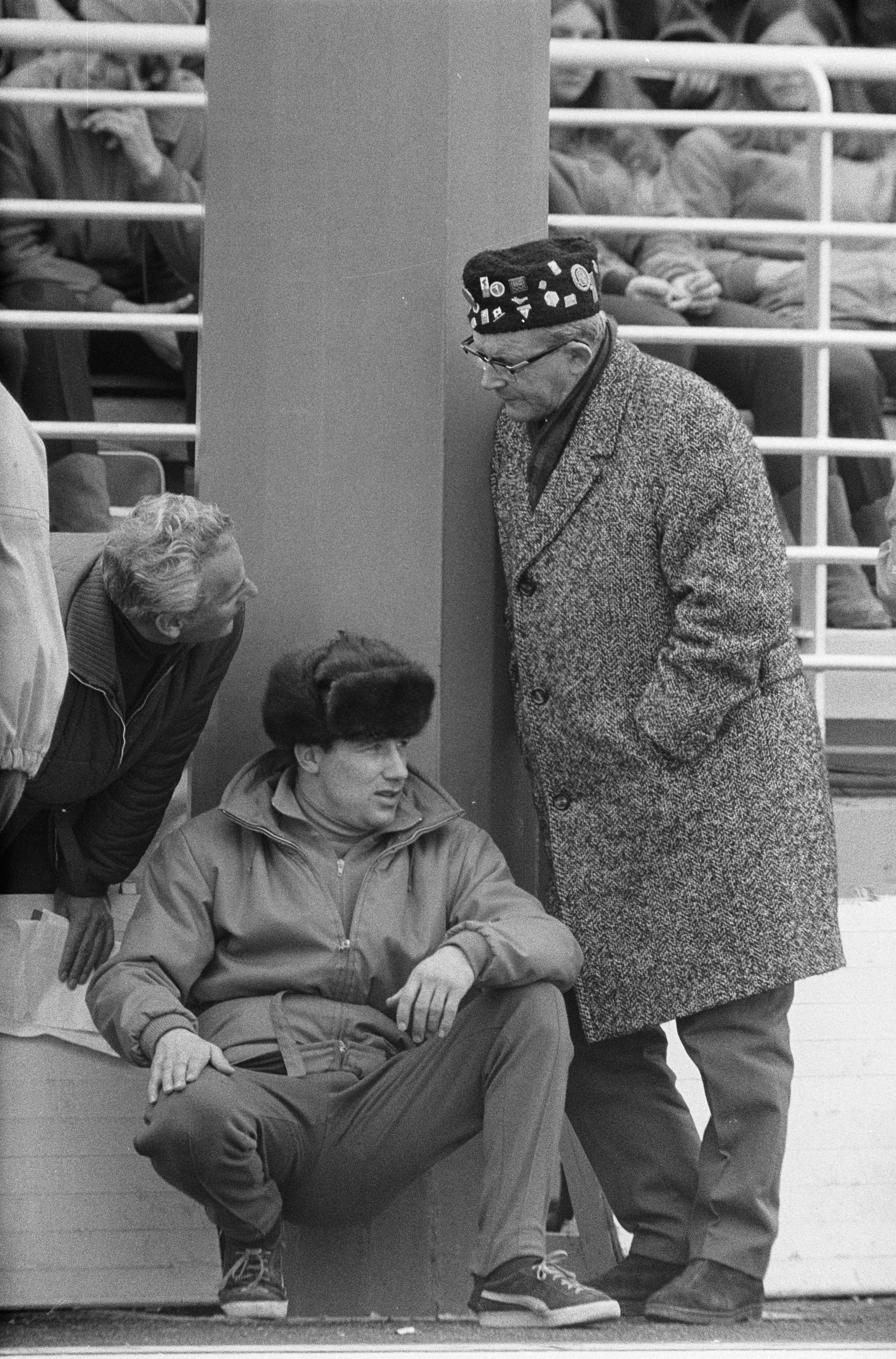
Kees Verkerk with father at the 1968 Olympics

Personal records
Discipline	Result	Date	Location	Note
500m	39.9	15 January 1971	Davos	
1,000m	1:21.4	19 January 1971	Davos	
1,500m	1:58.9	16 January 1971	Davos	
3,000m	4:14.9	2 March 1972	Inzell	
5,000m	7:13.2	1 March 1969	Inzell	
10,000m	15:03.6	26 January 1969	Inzell	
Big combination	171.520	23 January 1972	Davos	

Verkerk has an Adelskalender score of 168.033 points. Except for two days in February 1968, he was number one on the Adelskalender from 28 February 1967 until 5 February 1971 – a total of 1444 days. The Adelskalender is an all-time allround speed skating ranking.

Source: SpeedSkatingStats.com

== Tournament overview ==
Season	Dutch Championships Allround	European Championships Allround	Olympic Games	World Championships Allround	ISSL European Championships Allround	ISSL World Championships Allround
1962–63	GRONINGEN 12th 500m (bronze) 5000m 4th 1500m 4th 10000m 4th overall					
1963–64		OSLO 21st 500m 10th 5000m 15th 1500m 8th 10000m 12th overall	INNSBRUCK (silver) 1500m 9th 5000m 16th 10000m	HELSINKI 28th 500m 13th 5000m 20th 1500m 12th 10000m 11th overall		
1964–65	AMSTERDAM 8th 500m (gold) 5000m 4th 1500m (bronze) 10000m (bronze) overall	GOTHENBURG 13th 500m 4th 5000m 8th 1500m 4th 10000m 8th overall		OSLO 14th 500m 4th 5000m 19th 1500m 13th 10000m 10th overall		
1965–66	DEVENTER (gold) 500m (gold) 5000m (gold) 1500m (gold) 10000m (gold) overall	DEVENTER 4th 500m (bronze) 5000m (bronze) 1500m (silver) 10000m (silver) overall		GOTHENBURG 20th 500m (gold) 5000m (gold) 1500m (gold) 10000m (gold) overall		
1966–67	AMSTERDAM (bronze) 500m (gold) 5000m (gold) 1500m (gold) 10000m (gold) overall	LAHTI 4th 500m (gold) 5000m (gold) 1500m (gold) 3000m• (gold) overall		OSLO 9th 500m (gold) 5000m (silver) 1500m (gold) 10000m (gold) overall		
1967–68	AMSTERDAM 9th 500m 9th 5000m (silver) 1500m 7th 10000m 4th overall	OSLO 11th 500m 7th 5000m 9th 1500m 7th 10000m 8th overall	GRENOBLE 33rd 500m (gold) 1500m (silver) 5000m 5th 10000m	GOTHENBURG 9th 500m (silver) 5000m 5th 1500m 6th 10000m 4th overall		
1968–69	HEERENVEEN (silver) 500m (gold) 5000m (gold) 1500m (gold) 10000m (gold) overall	INZELL 6th 500m 10th 5000m (gold) 1500m (gold) 10000m (silver) overall		DEVENTER 22nd 500m (gold) 5000m (gold) 1500m 4th 10000m (bronze) overall		
1969–70		INNSBRUCK 11th 500m (gold) 5000m 10th 1500m 4th 10000m 7th overall		OSLO 10th 500m (silver) 5000m (silver) 1500m (bronze) 10000m (bronze) overall		
1970–71	AMSTERDAM 4th 500m 8th 5000m (silver) 1500m 5th 10000m 4th overall	HEERENVEEN 16th 500m 5th 5000m 4th 1500m (silver) 10000m (bronze) overall		GOTHENBURG 12th 500m (silver) 5000m 10th 1500m (silver) 10000m (bronze) overall		
1971–72	DEVENTER (gold) 500m 4th 5000m (gold) 1500m (bronze) 10000m (gold) overall	DAVOS 13th 500m (bronze) 5000m 7th 1500m (gold) 10000m 4th overall	SAPPORO 8th 1500m 6th 5000m (silver) 10000m	OSLO 20th 500m 6th 5000m 9th 1500m 5th 10000m 6th overall		
1972–73					SKIEN 7th 500m (silver) 5000m 7th 1500m (bronze) 10000m 5th overall	GOTHENBURG 7th 500m (bronze) 5000m 5th 1500m 5th 10000m 6th overall
1973–74					TYNSET (bronze) 500m 4th 5000m (bronze) 1500m (gold) 10000m (bronze) overall	

- ISSL= International Speed Skating League

== Medals won ==
Championship	Gold (gold)	Silver (silver)	Bronze (bronze)
European Allround Classification	1	2	1
Olympic Games	1	3	0
World Allround Classification	2	0	3
International Speed Skating League	0	0	1

Awards
Preceded by (Netherlands) Anton Geesink	Dutch Sportsman of the Year with Ard Schenk; 1966	Succeeded by (Netherlands) Kees Verkerk
Preceded by (Netherlands) Kees Verkerk and Ard Schenk	Dutch Sportsman of the Year; 1967	Succeeded by (Netherlands) Jan Janssen
Preceded by (Norway) Per Ivar Moe	Oscar Mathisen Award; 1966–1967	Succeeded by (Norway) Fred Anton Maier
