= World Allround Speed Skating Championships for Men =

Sporting competition

World Allround Speed Skating Championships
- Status: active
- Genre: sports event
- Date: January–March
- Frequency: biennial
- Location: various
- Inaugurated: 1889
- Organiser: ISU

The International Skating Union has organised the World Allround Speed Skating Championships for Men since 1893. Unofficial Championships were held in the years 1889–1892.

== History ==
=== Distances used ===
- In 1889, three distances had to be skated: 1/2 mile (805 m) — 1 mile (1,609 m) — 2 miles (3,219 m).
- In the years 1890–1892, four distances had to be skated: 1/2 mile (805 m) — 1 mile (1,609 m) — 2 miles (3,219 m) — 5 miles (8,047 m).
- Since 1893, four distances have to be skated: 500 m (0.31 mi) — 1,500 m (0.93 mi) — 5,000 m (3.1 mi) — 10,000 m (6.2 mi) (the big combination).

=== Ranking systems used ===
- In 1889, one could only win the World Championships by winning all three distances. If no one won all three distances, no winner would be declared. Silver and bronze medals were not awarded.
- In the years 1890–1907, one could only win the World Championships by winning at least three of the four distances, so there would be no World Champion if no skater won at least three distances. Silver and bronze medals were never awarded.
- In the years 1908–1925, ranking points were awarded (1 point for 1st place, 2 points for 2nd place, and so on); the final ranking was then decided by ordering the skaters by lowest point totals. The rule that a skater winning at least three distances was automatically World Champion was still in effect, though, so the ranking could be affected by that. Silver and bronze medals were awarded now as well.
- In the years 1926–1927, the ranking points on each distance were percentage points, calculated from a skater's time and the current world record time. Apart from that, the system used was the same as in the immediately preceding years.
- Since 1928, the samalog system has been in use. However, the rule that a skater winning at least three distances was automatically World Champion remained in effect until (and including) 1986. This rule was applied in 1983 when Rolf Falk-Larssen from Norway won three distances and thus become World Champion despite after end of fourth distance (10,000 m) he had a worse samalog score than silver medalist Tomas Gustafson from Sweden.

=== Records ===
- Sven Kramer from Netherlands has won a total of nine world championships, in 2007, 2008, 2009, 2010, 2012, 2013, 2015, 2016 and 2017. He also hold records for total number of medals (12) by winning bronze medals in 2005, 2006 and 2019. Before Kramer, Clas Thunberg from Finland and Oscar Mathisen from Norway held the record with five world championships.
- Sven Kramer has won four consecutive world championships, in 2007, 2008, 2009 and 2010.
- The youngest World Allround Champion is Eric Heiden from the United States who won his first of three world allround titles in 1977 at age 18.
- The oldest World Allround Champion is Clas Thunberg from Finland who won his fifth and last world allround title in 1931 at age 37.
- Roberto Sighel from Italy hold record by number of participations in the championships (16 times in 1987–2002).
- The biggest point margin between the winner and the second placed skater at the end of competition is 4.832 points between Eric Heiden from the United States and Jan Egil Storholt from Norway in 1979.
- At the 1983 championships, Rolf Falk-Larssen from Norway won three distances and thus become World Allround Champion in accordance with then-existing rule. Being de-facto champion, he finished in 13th place at final distance (10,000 m) and in second place in points classification by losing 0.424 points to Tomas Gustafson from Sweden who eventually become silver medalist. Without taking into account this case, the smallest winning margin between the champion and the runner-up is 0.042 points between Soviet skaters Oleg Goncharenko and Robert Merkulov in 1956.
- There are six speed skaters who become World Allround Champions by winning all four distances at the championships – Joe Donoghue from the United States (1891; unofficial championships), Jaap Eden from Netherlands (1896), Nikolay Strunnikov from Russia (1911), Oscar Mathisen from Norway (1912), Ard Schenk from Netherlands (1972) and Eric Heiden from the United States (1979).
- By contrast, there are 13 speed skaters who become World Allround Champions without winning any of four distances – Michael Staksrud from Norway (1937), Alfons Bērziņš from Latvia (1940; unofficial championships), Odd Lundberg from Norway (1948), Juhani Järvinen from Finland (1959), Viktor Kosichkin from the Soviet Union (1962), Dag Fornæss from Norway (1969), Harm Kuipers from Netherlands (1975), Eric Flaim from the United States (1988), Johann Olav Koss from Norway (1990), Roberto Sighel from Italy (1992), Rintje Ritsma from Netherlands (1999 and 2001), Chad Hedrick from the United States (2004) and Koen Verweij from Netherlands (2014).
- Eric Heiden and Shani Davis (both from the United States) are only men's speed skaters who become champions both at the World Allround and the World Sprint Championships. Heiden won three World Allround Championships in 1977–1979 and four World Sprint Championships in 1977–1980. He remained the only men's speed skater who win both championships in one calendar year by firstly achieving this feat in 1977 and then repeating this success in 1978 and 1979. Shani Davis is the only men's speed skater who won world titles at three different championships – World Allround Championships (2005 and 2006), World Sprint Championships (2009) and World Single Distances Championships (8 gold medals in 2004–2015).

== Medal winners ==
=== Unofficial championships ===
Year	Location	Gold	Silver	Bronze
1889	Amsterdam	None declared	None declared	None declared
1890	Amsterdam	None declared	None declared	None declared
1891	Amsterdam	(United States) Joe Donoghue	None declared	None declared
1892	Amsterdam	Cancelled due to ice conditions		
1940	Oslo	(Latvia) Alfons Bērziņš	(Norway) Harry Haraldsen	(Norway) Charles Mathiesen
1946	Oslo	(Norway) Odd Lundberg	(Sweden) Göthe Hedlund	(Norway) Charles Mathiesen

=== Official championships ===
Year	Location	Gold	Silver	Bronze
1893	Amsterdam	(Netherlands) Jaap Eden	None declared	None declared
1894	Stockholm	None declared	None declared	None declared
1895	Hamar	(Netherlands) Jaap Eden	None declared	None declared
1896	St. Petersburg	(Netherlands) Jaap Eden (3)	None declared	None declared
1897	Montreal	(Canada) Jack McCulloch	None declared	None declared
1898	Davos	(Norway) Peder Østlund	None declared	None declared
1899	Berlin	(Norway) Peder Østlund (2)	None declared	None declared
1900	Kristiania (Oslo)	(Norway) Edvard Engelsaas	None declared	None declared
1901	Stockholm	(Russia) Franz Frederik Wathén (Note: Wathén represented the Grand Duchy of Finland which was part of the Russian Empire at that time.)	None declared	None declared
1902	Helsingfors (Helsinki)	None declared	None declared	None declared
1903	St. Petersburg	None declared	None declared	None declared
1904	Kristiania (Oslo)	(Norway) Sigurd Mathisen	None declared	None declared
1905	Groningen	(Netherlands) Coen de Koning	None declared	None declared
1906	Helsingfors (Helsinki)	None declared	None declared	None declared
1907	Trondhjem (Trondheim)	None declared	None declared	None declared
1908	Davos	(Norway) Oscar Mathisen	(Norway) Martin Sæterhaug	(Sweden) Moje Öholm
1909	Kristiania (Oslo)	(Norway) Oscar Mathisen	(Norway) Oluf Steen	(Sweden) Otto Andersson
1910	Helsingfors (Helsinki)	(Russia) Nikolay Strunnikov	(Norway) Oscar Mathisen	(Norway) Martin Sæterhaug
1911	Trondhjem (Trondheim)	(Russia) Nikolay Strunnikov (2)	(Norway) Martin Sæterhaug	(Norway) Henning Olsen
1912	Kristiania (Oslo)	(Norway) Oscar Mathisen	(Russia) Gunnar Strömsten (Note: Strömsten represented the Grand Duchy of Finland which was part of the Russian Empire at that time.)	(Norway) Trygve Lundgreen
1913	Helsingfors (Helsinki)	(Norway) Oscar Mathisen	(Russia) Vasily Ippolitov	(Russian Empire) Nikita Naidenov
1914	Kristiania (Oslo)	(Norway) Oscar Mathisen (5)	(Russia) Vasily Ippolitov	(Russia) Väinö Wickström (Note: Wickstrøm represented the Grand Duchy of Finland which was part of the Russian Empire at that time.)
1915	Not held due to World War I			
1916	Not held due to World War I			
1917	Not held due to World War I			
1918	Not held due to World War I			
1919	Not held due to World War I			
1920	Not held due to World War I			
1921	Not held due to World War I			
1922	Kristiania (Oslo)	(Norway) Harald Strøm	(Norway) Roald Larsen	(Finland) Clas Thunberg
1923	Stockholm	(Finland) Clas Thunberg	(Norway) Harald Strøm	(Soviet Union) Yakov Melnikov
1924	Helsinki	(Norway) Roald Larsen	(Finland) Uuno Pietilä	(Finland) Julius Skutnabb
1925	Oslo	(Finland) Clas Thunberg	(Finland) Uuno Pietilä	(Norway) Roald Larsen
1926	Trondhjem (Trondheim)	(Norway) Ivar Ballangrud	(Norway) Roald Larsen	(Norway) Bernt Evensen
1927	Tampere	(Norway) Bernt Evensen	(Finland) Clas Thunberg	(Norway) Armand Carlsen
1928	Davos	(Finland) Clas Thunberg	(Norway) Ivar Ballangrud	(Norway) Bernt Evensen
1929	Oslo	(Finland) Clas Thunberg	(Norway) Ivar Ballangrud	(Norway) Michael Staksrud
1930	Oslo	(Norway) Michael Staksrud	(Norway) Ivar Ballangrud	(Netherlands) Dolf van der Scheer
1931	Helsinki	(Finland) Clas Thunberg (5)	(Norway) Bernt Evensen	(Norway) Ivar Ballangrud
1932	Lake Placid	(Norway) Ivar Ballangrud	(Norway) Michael Staksrud	(Norway) Bernt Evensen
1933	Trondheim	(Norway) Hans Engnestangen	(Norway) Michael Staksrud	(Norway) Ivar Ballangrud
1934	Helsinki	(Norway) Bernt Evensen (2)	(Finland) Birger Wasenius	(Norway) Ivar Ballangrud
1935	Oslo	(Norway) Michael Staksrud	(Norway) Ivar Ballangrud	(Norway) Hans Engnestangen
1936	Davos	(Norway) Ivar Ballangrud	(Finland) Birger Wasenius	(United States) Eddie Schroeder
1937	Oslo	(Norway) Michael Staksrud (3)	(Finland) Birger Wasenius	(Austria) Max Stiepl
1938	Davos	(Norway) Ivar Ballangrud (4)	(Austria) Karl Wazulek	(Norway) Charles Mathiesen
1939	Helsinki	(Finland) Birger Wasenius	(Latvia) Alfons Bērziņš	(Norway) Charles Mathiesen
1940	Not held due to World War II			
1941	Not held due to World War II			
1942	Not held due to World War II			
1943	Not held due to World War II			
1944	Not held due to World War II			
1945	Not held due to World War II			
1946	Not held due to World War II			
1947	Oslo	(Finland) Lassi Parkkinen	(Norway) Sverre Farstad	(Sweden) Åke Seyffarth
1948	Helsinki	(Norway) Odd Lundberg (2 (Note: Lundberg won his first allround title in 1946 at the unofficial World Championships.))	(United States) Johnny Werket	(Norway) Henry Wahl
1949	Oslo	(Hungary) Kornél Pajor	(Netherlands) Kees Broekman	(Norway) Odd Lundberg
1950	Eskilstuna	(Norway) Hjalmar Andersen	(Norway) Odd Lundberg	(United States) Johnny Werket
1951	Davos	(Norway) Hjalmar Andersen	(United Kingdom) Johnny Cronshey	Kornél Pajor (Note: Pajor used to skate for Hungary until he defected in 1949. From then on the ISU allowed him to participate as an independent skater representing the ISU as he did in 1951. In 1952 he represented Sweden at the European Allround Championships in Östersund in Sweden winning the bronze medal in the overall standings.)
1952	Hamar	(Norway) Hjalmar Andersen (3)	(Finland) Lassi Parkkinen	(Norway) Ivar Martinsen
1953	Helsinki	(Soviet Union) Oleg Goncharenko	(Soviet Union) Boris Shilkov	(Netherlands) Wim van der Voort
1954	Sapporo	(Soviet Union) Boris Shilkov	(Soviet Union) Oleg Goncharenko	(Soviet Union) Yevgeny Grishin
1955	Moscow	(Sweden) Sigvard Ericsson	(Soviet Union) Oleg Goncharenko	(Soviet Union) Boris Shilkov
1956	Oslo	(Soviet Union) Oleg Goncharenko	(Soviet Union) Robert Merkulov	(Soviet Union) Yevgeny Grishin
1957	Östersund	(Norway) Knut Johannesen	(Soviet Union) Boris Shilkov	(Soviet Union) Boris Tsybin
1958	Helsinki	(Soviet Union) Oleg Goncharenko (3)	(Soviet Union) Vladimir Shilykovsky	(Norway) Roald Aas
1959	Oslo	(Finland) Juhani Järvinen	(Finland) Toivo Salonen	(Soviet Union) Robert Merkulov
1960	Davos	(Soviet Union) Boris Stenin	(France) André Kouprianoff	(East Germany) Helmut Kuhnert
1961	Gothenburg	(Netherlands) Henk van der Grift	(Soviet Union) Viktor Kosichkin	(Netherlands) Rudie Liebrechts
1962	Moscow	(Soviet Union) Viktor Kosichkin	(Netherlands) Henk van der Grift	(Sweden) Ivar Nilsson
1963	Karuizawa	(Sweden) Jonny Nilsson	(Norway) Knut Johannesen	(Norway) Nils Aaness
1964	Helsinki	(Norway) Knut Johannesen (2)	(Soviet Union) Viktor Kosichkin	(Netherlands) Rudie Liebrechts
1965	Oslo	(Norway) Per Ivar Moe	(Finland) Jouko Launonen	(Netherlands) Ard Schenk
1966	Gothenburg	(Netherlands) Kees Verkerk	(Netherlands) Ard Schenk	(Sweden) Jonny Nilsson
1967	Oslo	(Netherlands) Kees Verkerk (2)	(Netherlands) Ard Schenk	(Norway) Fred Anton Maier
1968	Gothenburg	(Norway) Fred Anton Maier	(Norway) Magne Thomassen	(Netherlands) Ard Schenk
1969	Deventer	(Norway) Dag Fornæss	(Sweden) Göran Claeson	(Netherlands) Kees Verkerk
1970	Oslo	(Netherlands) Ard Schenk	(Norway) Magne Thomassen	(Netherlands) Kees Verkerk
1971	Gothenburg	(Netherlands) Ard Schenk	(Sweden) Göran Claeson	(Netherlands) Kees Verkerk
1972	Oslo	(Netherlands) Ard Schenk (3)	(Norway) Roar Grønvold	(Netherlands) Jan Bols
1973	Deventer	(Sweden) Göran Claeson	(Norway) Sten Stensen	(Netherlands) Piet Kleine
1974	Inzell	(Norway) Sten Stensen	(Netherlands) Harm Kuipers	(Sweden) Göran Claeson
1975	Oslo	(Netherlands) Harm Kuipers	(Soviet Union) Vladimir Ivanov	(Soviet Union) Yuri Kondakov
1976	Heerenveen	(Netherlands) Piet Kleine	(Norway) Sten Stensen	(Netherlands) Hans van Helden
1977	Heerenveen	(United States) Eric Heiden	(Norway) Jan Egil Storholt	(Norway) Sten Stensen
1978	Gothenburg	(United States) Eric Heiden	(Norway) Jan Egil Storholt	(Soviet Union) Sergey Marchuk
1979	Oslo	(United States) Eric Heiden (3)	(Norway) Jan Egil Storholt	(Norway) Kay Arne Stenshjemmet
1980	Heerenveen	(Netherlands) Hilbert van der Duim	(United States) Eric Heiden	(Norway) Tom Erik Oxholm
1981	Oslo	(Norway) Amund Sjøbrend	(Norway) Kay Arne Stenshjemmet	(Norway) Jan Egil Storholt
1982	Assen	(Netherlands) Hilbert van der Duim (2)	(Soviet Union) Dmitry Bochkaryov	(Norway) Rolf Falk-Larssen
1983	Oslo	(Norway) Rolf Falk-Larssen	(Sweden) Tomas Gustafson	(Soviet Union) Aleksandr Baranov
1984	Gothenburg	(Soviet Union) Oleg Bozhev	(East Germany) Andreas Ehrig	(Netherlands) Hilbert van der Duim
1985	Hamar	(Netherlands) Hein Vergeer	(Soviet Union) Oleg Bozhev	(Netherlands) Hilbert van der Duim
1986	Inzell	(Netherlands) Hein Vergeer (2)	(Soviet Union) Oleg Bozhev	(Soviet Union) Viktor Shasherin
1987	Heerenveen	(Soviet Union) Nikolay Gulyayev	(Soviet Union) Oleg Bozhev	(Austria) Michael Hadschieff
1988	Alma-Ata	(United States) Eric Flaim	(Netherlands) Leo Visser	(United States) Dave Silk
1989	Oslo	(Netherlands) Leo Visser	(Netherlands) Gerard Kemkers	(Norway) Geir Karlstad
1990	Innsbruck	(Norway) Johann Olav Koss	(Netherlands) Ben van der Burg	(Netherlands) Bart Veldkamp
1991	Heerenveen	(Norway) Johann Olav Koss	(Italy) Roberto Sighel	(Netherlands) Bart Veldkamp
1992	Calgary	(Italy) Roberto Sighel	(Netherlands) Falko Zandstra	(Norway) Johann Olav Koss
1993	Hamar	(Netherlands) Falko Zandstra	(Norway) Johann Olav Koss	(Netherlands) Rintje Ritsma
1994	Gothenburg	(Norway) Johann Olav Koss (3)	(Netherlands) Ids Postma	(Netherlands) Rintje Ritsma
1995	Baselga di Pinè	(Netherlands) Rintje Ritsma	(Japan) Keiji Shirahata	(Italy) Roberto Sighel
1996	Inzell	(Netherlands) Rintje Ritsma	(Netherlands) Ids Postma	(Japan) Keiji Shirahata
1997	Nagano	(Netherlands) Ids Postma	(Japan) Keiji Shirahata	(Germany) Frank Dittrich
1998	Heerenveen	(Netherlands) Ids Postma (2)	(Netherlands) Rintje Ritsma	(Italy) Roberto Sighel
1999	Hamar	(Netherlands) Rintje Ritsma	(Russia) Vadim Sayutin	(Norway) Eskil Ervik
2000	Milwaukee	(Netherlands) Gianni Romme	(Netherlands) Ids Postma	(Netherlands) Rintje Ritsma
2001	Budapest	(Netherlands) Rintje Ritsma (4)	(Netherlands) Ids Postma	(Belgium) Bart Veldkamp (Note: Until 1995 Veldkamp skated for the Netherlands. From 1996 he skated for Belgium in order to avoid having to participate in Dutch qualification trials for the major tournaments.)
2002	Heerenveen	(Netherlands) Jochem Uytdehaage	(Russia) Dmitry Shepel	(United States) Derek Parra
2003	Gothenburg	(Netherlands) Gianni Romme (2)	(Netherlands) Rintje Ritsma	(Netherlands) Ids Postma
2004	Hamar	(United States) Chad Hedrick	(United States) Shani Davis	(Netherlands) Carl Verheijen
2005	Moscow	(United States) Shani Davis	(United States) Chad Hedrick	(Netherlands) Sven Kramer
2006	Calgary	(United States) Shani Davis (2)	(Italy) Enrico Fabris	(Netherlands) Sven Kramer
2007	Heerenveen	(Netherlands) Sven Kramer	(Italy) Enrico Fabris	(Netherlands) Carl Verheijen
2008	Berlin	(Netherlands) Sven Kramer	(Norway) Håvard Bøkko	(United States) Shani Davis
2009	Hamar	(Netherlands) Sven Kramer	(Norway) Håvard Bøkko	(Italy) Enrico Fabris
2010	Heerenveen	(Netherlands) Sven Kramer	(United States) Jonathan Kuck	(Norway) Håvard Bøkko
2011	Calgary	(Russia) Ivan Skobrev	(Norway) Håvard Bøkko	(Netherlands) Jan Blokhuijsen
2012	Moscow	(Netherlands) Sven Kramer	(Netherlands) Jan Blokhuijsen	(Netherlands) Koen Verweij
2013	Hamar	(Netherlands) Sven Kramer	(Norway) Håvard Bøkko	(Belgium) Bart Swings
2014	Heerenveen	(Netherlands) Koen Verweij	(Netherlands) Jan Blokhuijsen	(Russia) Denis Yuskov
2015	Calgary	(Netherlands) Sven Kramer	(Russia) Denis Yuskov	(Norway) Sverre Lunde Pedersen
2016	Berlin	(Netherlands) Sven Kramer	(Norway) Sverre Lunde Pedersen	(Netherlands) Jan Blokhuijsen
2017	Hamar	(Netherlands) Sven Kramer (9)	(Netherlands) Patrick Roest	(Netherlands) Jan Blokhuijsen
2018	Amsterdam	(Netherlands) Patrick Roest	(Norway) Sverre Lunde Pedersen	(Netherlands) Marcel Bosker
2019	Calgary	(Netherlands) Patrick Roest	(Norway) Sverre Lunde Pedersen	(Netherlands) Sven Kramer
2020	Hamar	(Netherlands) Patrick Roest (3)	(Norway) Sverre Lunde Pedersen	(Japan) Seitaro Ichinohe
2022	Hamar	(Sweden) Nils van der Poel	(Netherlands) Patrick Roest	(Belgium) Bart Swings
2024	Inzell	(United States) Jordan Stolz	(Netherlands) Patrick Roest	(Norway) Hallgeir Engebråten
2026	Heerenveen	(Norway) Sander Eitrem	(Czech Republic) Metoděj Jílek	(Poland) Vladimir Semirunniy

=== All-time medal count ===
Rank	Nation	Gold	Silver	Bronze	Total
1	Netherlands	40	20	30	90
2	Norway	38	36	34	108
3	Finland	9	10	3	22
4	United States	9	5	5	19
5	Soviet Union	8	13	10	31
6	Sweden	4	4	6	14
7	Russia	3	5	2	10
8	Italy	1	3	3	7
9	Latvia	1	1	0	2
10	Canada	1	0	0	1
10	Hungary	1	0	0	1
12	Japan	0	2	2	4
13	Austria	0	1	2	3
14	East Germany	0	1	1	2
15	Czech Republic	0	1	0	1
15	France	0	1	0	1
15	Great Britain	0	1	0	1
18	Belgium	0	0	3	3
19	Germany	0	0	1	1
19	Poland	0	0	1	1
–	Independent	0	0	1	1
Totals (20 entries)		115	104	104	323

Unofficial World Championships of 1889–1892, 1940 and 1946 (not recognized by the ISU) included

== Multiple medalists ==
Boldface denotes active skaters and highest medal count among all skaters (including those who are not included in these tables) per type.

Rank	Skater	Country	From	To	Gold	Silver	Bronze	Total
1	Sven Kramer	Netherlands	2005	2019	**9**	–	3	**12**
2	Clas Thunberg	Finland	1922	1931	5	1	1	7
3	Oscar Mathisen	Norway	1908	1914	5	1	–	6
4	Ivar Ballangrud	Norway	1926	1938	4	**4**	3	11
5	Rintje Ritsma	Netherlands	1993	2003	4	2	3	9
6	**Patrick Roest**	Netherlands	2017	2024	3	3	–	6
7	Ard Schenk	Netherlands	1965	1972	3	2	2	7
8	Michael Staksrud	Norway	1929	1937	3	2	1	6
9	Oleg Goncharenko	Soviet Union	1953	1958	3	2	–	5
10	Johann Olav Koss	Norway	1990	1994	3	1	1	5

== See also ==
- World Allround Speed Skating Championships for Women
