= 1979 World Allround Speed Skating Championships =

International speed skating competition

1979 World Allround Speed Skating Championships for Men
- Venue: Bislett Stadium, Oslo, Norway
- Dates: 11–12 February
- Competitors: 33 skaters from 15 nations

Medalist men
1st place, gold medalist(s)		Eric Heiden	USA
2nd place, silver medalist(s)		Jan Egil Storholt	NOR
3rd place, bronze medalist(s)		Kay Arne Stenshjemmet	NOR

The World Allround Speed Skating Championships for Men took place on 11 and 12 February in Oslo at the Bislett Stadium ice rink.

It was for the third time that Eric Heiden became the world champion and he equaled the performances of the Norwegians Oscar Mathisen and Hjalmar Andersen and the Netherlander Ard Schenk.

== Classification ==
Rank	Skater	Country	Points Samalog	500m	5000m	1500m	10,000m
1st place, gold medalist(s)	Eric Heiden	United States	162.973 WR	38.22 (gold)	6:59.15 (gold)	1:56.05 (gold)	14:43.11 (gold)
2nd place, silver medalist(s)	Jan Egil Storholt	Norway	167.805	39.03 (2)	7:13.18 (7)	2:00.68 (5)	15:04.62 (5)
3rd place, bronze medalist(s)	Kay Arne Stenshjemmet	Norway	167.903	39.24 (4)	7:12.73 (6)	1:59.60 (2)	15:10.48 (8)
4	Mike Woods	United States	168.497	39.83 (13)	7:10.93 (2)	2:01.87 (11)	14:59.03 (4)
5	Viktor Lyoskin	Soviet Union	168.660	40.12 (15)	7:12.10 (4)	2:01.18 (7)	14:58.74 (2)
6	Masahiko Yamamoto	Japan	168.870	39.64 (8)	7:16.91 (12)	2:01.78 (10)	14:58.93 (3)
7	Masayuki Kawahara	Japan	169.036	39.70 (11)	7:16.10 (11)	2:00.67 (4)	15:10.06 (7)
8	Amund Martin Sjøbrend	Norway	169.223	40.07 (14)	7:11.22 (3)	2:00.92 (6)	15:14.51 (11)
9	Tomas Gustafson	Sweden	169.533	39.60 (6)	7:14.40 (8)	2:01.61 (9)	15:19.14 (13)
10	Vladimir Lobanov	Soviet Union	170.340	39.64 (8)	7:18.61 (15)	2:00.12 (3)	15:35.98 (16)
11	Yep Kramer	Netherlands	170.360	40.24 (16)	7:15.28 (10)	2:02.05 (14)	15:18.19 (12)
12	Henning Kaarud	Norway	170.695	40.47 (18)	7:17.79 (13)	2:02.94 (16)	15:09.33 (6)
13	Piet Kleine	Netherlands	170.772	40.93 (21)	7:15.23 (9)	2:01.94 (13)	15:13.46 (10)
14	Colin Coates	Austria	171.456	41.03 (23)	7:18.95 (16)	2:03.00 (17)	15:10.63 (9)
15	Klaas Vriend	Netherlands	172.082	40.63 (20)	7:18.05 (14)	2:03.04 (18)	15:32.68 (15)
16	Hilbert van der Duim	Netherlands	174.122	39.69 (10)	7:12.25 (5)	2:15.69* (32)	15:19.55 (14)
NC17	Sergey Marchuk	Soviet Union	124.023	39.61 (7)	7:20.03 (19)	2:01.23 (8)	–
NC18	Craig Kressler	United States	124.338	39.41 (5)	7:22.92 (20)	2:01.91 (12)	–
NC19	Lee Yeong-ha	South Korea	125.626	39.12 (3)	7:32.70 (26)	2:03.71 (19)	–
NC20	Andreas Ehrig	East Germany	125.670	41.08 (24)	7:19.00 (17)	2:02.07 (15)	–
NC21	Jan Junell	Sweden	126.030	40.35 (17)	7:22.97 (21)	2:04.15 (22)	–
NC22	Dmitry Ogloblin	Soviet Union	126.667	41.30 (26)	7:19.97 (18)	2:04.11 (21)	–
NC23	Uwe Sauerteig	East Germany	127.112	40.95 (22)	7:23.36 (22)	2:05.48 (23)	–
NC24	Craig Webster	Canada	128.035	40.61 (19)	7:31.09 (24)	2:06.95 (28)	–
NC25	Jouko Salakka	Finland	128.209	41.09 (25)	7:32.43 (25)	2:05.63 (24)	–
NC26	Günter Schumacher	West Germany	129.267	41.56 (28)	7:36.71 (28)	2:06.11 (26)	–
NC27	Fritz Gawenus	West Germany	129.672	41.31 (27)	7:41.22 (29)	2:06.72 (27)	–
NC28	Simon Grenshaw	United Kingdom	129.951	39.76 (12)	7:57.21 (32)	2:07.41 (29)	–
NC29	Olivier Belle	France	131.469	41.75 (29)	7:50.46 (31)	2:08.02 (30)	–
NC30	Ulf Ekstrand	Sweden	135.900	50.18* (30)	7:24.07 (23)	2:03.94 (20)	–
NC31	Andrei Erdelyi	Romania	144.505	55.53* (32)	7:33.39 (27)	2:10.91 (31)	–
NC32	Antonio Gómez Fernández	Spain	155.785	50.41 (31)	9:06.55 (33)	2:32.16 (33)	–
NC	Maurizio Marchetto	Italy	88.215	DQ	7:42.39 (30)	2:05.93 (25)	–

* = Fell
DQ = Disqualified

== Attribution ==
In Dutch
