= 1976 World Allround Speed Skating Championships =

International speed skating competition

1976 World Allround Speed Skating Championships for Men
- Venue: Thialf, Heerenveen, Netherlands
- Dates: 28–29 February
- Competitors: 32 skaters from 17 nations

Medalist men
1st place, gold medalist(s)		Piet Kleine	NED
2nd place, silver medalist(s)		Sten Stensen	NOR
3rd place, bronze medalist(s)		Hans van Helden	NED

The World Allround Speed Skating Championships for Men took place on 28 and 29 February 1976 in Heerenveen at the Thialf ice rink.

== Classification ==
Rank	Skater	Country	Points Samalog	500m	5000m	1500m	10,000m
1st place, gold medalist(s)	Piet Kleine	Netherlands	170.255	40.60 (12)	7:09.32 (2)	2:03.33 (gold)	15:12.25 (gold)
2nd place, silver medalist(s)	Sten Stensen	Norway	170.956	40.42 (7)	7:16.11 (3)	2:03.81 (3)	15:13.10 (2)
3rd place, bronze medalist(s)	Hans van Helden	Netherlands	171.108	39.80 (4)	7:08.72 (gold)	2:04.33 (5)	15:39.85 (10)
4	Kay Arne Stenshjemmet	Norway	172.028	39.65 (2)	7:21.77 (8)	2:04.06 (4)	15:36.96 (6)
5	Eric Heiden	United States	172.738	39.11 (gold)	7:28.64 (16)	2:04.56 (6)	15:44.88 (13)
6	Jan Egil Storholt	Norway	172.759	40.25 (6)	7:23.82 (12)	2:03.76 (2)	15:37.47 (8)
7	Amund Martin Sjøbrend	Norway	173.001	40.48 (9)	7:18.97 (4)	2:05.39 (8)	15:36.54 (5)
8	Sergey Marchuk	Soviet Union	173.867	40.56 (11)	7:24.57 (13)	2:05.94 (11)	15:37.39 (7)
9	Dan Carroll	United States	174.005	40.47 (8)	7:23.52 (10)	2:05.78 (10)	15:45.11 (14)
10	Lennart Carlsson	Sweden	174.403	40.07 (5)	7:26.93 (14)	2:06.72 (13)	15:48.00 (15)
11	Viktor Varlamov	Soviet Union	174.718	41.85 (24)	7:21.04 (6)	2:06.87 (15)	15:29.47 (3)
12	Colin Coates	Australia	174.777	41.18 (17)	7:21.19 (7)	2:08.99 (19)	15:29.62 (4)
13	Vladimir Ivanov	Soviet Union	175.185	42.06 (27)	7:22.36 (9)	2:06.04 (12)	15:37.52 (9)
14	Yuri Kondakov	Soviet Union	175.932	40.88 (15)	7:31.75 (17)	2:07.28 (16)	15:49.00 (16)
15	Joop Pasman	Netherlands	179.200	40.66 (13)	7:23.74 (11)	2:21.16* (31)	15:42.26 (11)
16	Klaas Vriend	Netherlands	225.001	1:32.35* (32)	7:19.50 (5)	2:04.66 (7)	15:42.95 (12)
NC17	Klaus Wunderlich	East Germany	128.205	40.91 (16)	7:34.32 (20)	2:05.59 (9)	–
NC18	Lee Yeong-ha	South Korea	128.549	40.78 (14)	7:34.92 (21)	2:06.83 (14)	–
NC19	Masayuki Kawahara	Japan	129.190	41.36 (18)	7:33.03 (18)	2:07.58 (17)	–
NC20	Gaétan Boucher	Canada	130.112	39.68 (3)	7:56.89 (31)	2:08.23 (18)	–
NC21	Olavi Köppä	Finland	130.472	41.45 (22)	7:37.12 (22)	2:09.93 (22)	–
NC22	Andrzej Zawadzki	Poland	130.715	41.36 (18)	7:41.25 (23)	2:09.69 (20)	–
NC23	Masahiko Yamamoto	Japan	131.460	41.36 (18)	7:44.33 (24)	2:11.00 (23)	–
NC24	Ulf Ekstrand	Sweden	131.464	41.71 (23)	7:44.61 (25)	2:09.88 (21)	–
NC25	Zhao Weichang	Canada	132.223	41.36 (18)	7:45.40 (27)	2:12.97 (26)	–
NC26	Richard Tourne	France	132.285	40.51 (10)	8:00.28 (32)	2:11.24 (25)	–
NC27	Guo Chengjiang	China	132.301	41.86 (25)	7:47.31 (28)	2:11.13 (24)	–
NC28	Franz Krienbühl	Switzerland	133.043	42.53 (28)	7:33.63 (19)	2:15.45 (29)	–
NC29	Bruno Toniolli	Italy	134.151	41.93 (26)	7:50.94 (29)	2:15.38 (28)	–
NC30	Geoff Sandys	United Kingdom	134.879	42.96 (31)	7:45.26 (26)	2:16.18 (30)	–
NC31	Markus Eicher	West Germany	135.024	42.79 (29)	7:55.41 (30)	2:14.08 (27)	–
NC	Örjan Sandler	Sweden	87.620	42.84 (30)	7:27.80 (15)	~~2:07.57~~ DQ	–

DQ = Disqualified
* = Fell

== Attribution ==
In Dutch
