= 1983 World Allround Speed Skating Championships =

International speed skating competition

1983 World Allround Speed Skating Championships for Men
- Venue: Bislett Stadion, Oslo, Norway
- Dates: 12–13 February
- Competitors: 35 skaters from 16 nations

Medalist men
1st place, gold medalist(s)		Rolf Falk-Larssen	NOR
2nd place, silver medalist(s)		Tomas Gustafson	SWE
3rd place, bronze medalist(s)		Aleksandr Baranov	SOV

The World Allround Speed Skating Championships for Men took place on 12 and 13 February 1983 in Oslo at the Bislett Stadion ice rink.

Title holder was the Netherlander Hilbert van der Duim.

Prior to 1986, it was possible to win the world championships by winning 3 of the 4 distances. This is why Rolf Falk-Larssen became champion even though he had a higher samalog total than Tomas Gustafson.

== Classification ==
Rank	Skater	Country	Points Samalog	500m	5000m	1500m	10,000m
1st place, gold medalist(s)	Rolf Falk-Larssen	Norway	166.637	38.93 (gold)	7:05.05 (gold)	1:57.66 (gold)	15:19.64 (13)
2nd place, silver medalist(s)	Tomas Gustafson	Sweden	166.213	39.27 (5)	7:09.67 (4)	1:59.49 (4)	14:42.93 (gold)
3rd place, bronze medalist(s)	Aleksandr Baranov	Soviet Union	167.157	39.10 (3)	7:11.96 (8)	1:57.91 (2)	15:11.17 (8)
4	Yep Kramer	Netherlands	167.466	39.52 (11)	7:08.71 (2)	1:59.54 (5)	15:04.59 (6)
5	Dmitry Bochkaryov	Soviet Union	167.611	39.98 (19)	7:09.75 (5)	1:58.53 (3)	15:02.92 (3)
6	Sergey Berezin	Soviet Union	168.228	39.48 (10)	7:12.51 (9)	2:00.90 (11)	15:03.95 (4)
7	Bjørn Arne Nyland	Norway	168.302	39.62 (12)	7:13.48 (10)	2:00.32 (8)	15:04.56 (5)
8	Andreas Dietel	East Germany	168.663	39.45 (9)	7:15.44 (12)	2:00.26 (7)	15:11.67 (10)
9	Geir Karlstad	Norway	168.961	40.57 (30)	7:09.47 (3)	2:03.22 (22)	14:47.43 (2)
10	Konstantin Korotkov	Soviet Union	169.229	40.15 (23)	7:10.58 (6)	2:01.30 (14)	15:11.77 (11)
11	Frits Schalij	Netherlands	169.231	39.90 (17)	7:14.59 (11)	2:00.42 (9)	15:14.64 (12)
12	Jan Junell	Sweden	169.620	40.44 (28)	7:11.43 (7)	2:01.39 (15)	15:11.49 (9)
13	Werner Jäger	Austria	170.780	40.37 (26)	7:18.08 (14)	2:01.41 (16)	15:22.64 (14)
14	Hans van Helden	France	170.869	39.63 (13)	7:19.62 (15)	2:00.22 (6)	15:44.08 (16)
15	Michael Hadschieff	Austria	171.250	40.42 (27)	7:17.18 (13)	2:02.31 (18)	15:26.85 (15)
16	Frank Nauschütz	East Germany	175.495	43.35 (35)	7:21.35 (16)	2:07.78 (31)	15:08.35 (7)
17	Hilbert van der Duim	Netherlands	123.384	38.95 (2)	7:22.08 (17)	2:00.68 (10)	–
18	Masahito Shinohara	Japan	124.631	39.36 (7)	7:24.71 (21)	2:02.40 (19)	–
19	Wolfgang Scharf	West Germany	124.779	40.03 (21)	7:23.96 (19)	2:01.06 (12)	–
20	Mark Mitchell	United States	124.915	39.34 (6)	7:24.65 (20)	2:03.33 (24)	–
21	Gaétan Boucher	Canada	124.973	39.24 (4)	7:33.73 (27)	2:01.08 (13)	–
22	André Hoffmann	East Germany	124.973	39.71 (14)	7:25.20 (22)	2:02.23 (17)	–
23	Ulf Ekstrand	Sweden	125.310	39.73 (15)	7:26.10 (23)	2:02.91 (21)	–
24	Jean Pichette	Canada	125.544	40.19 (24)	7:22.31 (18)	2:03.37 (25)	–
25	Pertti Niittylä	Finland	126.091	40.24 (25)	7:27.68 (26)	2:03.25 (23)	–
26	Hans Sture Magnusson	Sweden	126.148	39.90 (17)	7:33.98 (28)	2:02.55 (20)	–
27	Tibor Kopacz	Romania	126.348	40.47 (29)	7:27.12 (25)	2:03.50 (26)	–
28	Masanori Takeshita	Japan	127.066	40.01 (20)	7:34.73 (29)	2:04.75 (28)	–
29	Yoon-Soo Ra	South Korea	127.997	40.09 (22)	7:43.57 (31)	2:04.65 (27)	–
30	Jacques Thibault	Canada	128.204	39.37 (8)	7:49.81 (33)	2:05.56 (29)	–
31	Mike Plant	United States	128.273	39.77 (16)	7:45.57 (32)	2:05.84 (30)	–
32	Maurizio Marchetto	Italy	129.449	42.03 (32)	7:26.73 (24)	2:08.24 (32)	–
33	Marc Vernier	France	131.033	40.58 (31)	7:52.53 (34)	2:09.60 (34)	–
34	Colin Coates	Australia	131.292	42.35 (33)	7:40.46 (30)	2:08.69 (33)	–
35	Derek Webber	United Kingdom	135.036	43.24 (34)	8:01.66 (35)	2:10.89 (35)	–

== Attribution ==
In Dutch
