= 1982 World Allround Speed Skating Championships =

International speed skating competition

1982 World Allround Speed Skating Championships for Men
- Venue: De Bonte Wever, Assen, Netherlands
- Dates: 20–21 February
- Competitors: 33 skaters from 16 nations

Medalist men
1st place, gold medalist(s)		Hilbert van der Duim	NED
2nd place, silver medalist(s)		Dmitry Bochkaryov	SOV
3rd place, bronze medalist(s)		Rolf Falk-Larssen	NOR

The World Allround Speed Skating Championships for Men took place on 20 and 21 February 1982 in Assen at the De Bonte Wever ice rink.

Title holder was the Norwegian Amund Sjøbrend.

== Classification ==
Rank	Skater	Country	Points Samalog	500m	5000m	1500m	10,000m
1st place, gold medalist(s)	Hilbert van der Duim	Netherlands	168.410	39.11 (4)	7:17.39 (3)	2:00.59 (gold)	15:07.30 (4)
2nd place, silver medalist(s)	Dmitry Bochkaryov	Soviet Union	168.771	39.56 (8)	7:13.65 (gold)	2:03.26 (9)	14:55.20 (gold)
3rd place, bronze medalist(s)	Rolf Falk-Larssen	Norway	169.320	39.38 (5)	7:17.84 (4)	2:01.13 (3)	15:15.60 (6)
4	Frits Schalij	Netherlands	169.412	39.00 (3)	7:22.12 (8)	2:00.69 (2)	15:19.40 (8)
5	Tomas Gustafson	Sweden	169.613	40.01 (12)	7:16.62 (2)	2:03.20 (8)	14:57.50 (2)
6	Tom Erik Oxholm	Norway	170.764	39.91 (10)	7:26.48 (12)	2:03.08 (6)	15:03.60 (3)
7	Viktor Shasherin	Soviet Union	170.901	39.44 (6)	7:23.33 (9)	2:04.00 (11)	15:15.90 (7)
8	Jan Junell	Sweden	171.754	40.08 (14)	7:24.93 (10)	2:04.82 (18)	15:11.50 (5)
9	Gaétan Boucher	Canada	172.445	38.53 (gold)	7:37.02 (27)	2:01.18 (4)	15:56.40 (16)
10	Aleksandr Ratsjev	Soviet Union	172.461	40.56 (21)	7:26.93 (13)	2:03.10 (7)	15:23.50 (9)
11	Sergej Pribytkov	Soviet Union	172.613	40.31 (17)	7:19.52 (6)	2:04.43 (16)	15:37.50 (14)
12	Werner Jäger	Austria	172.678	40.68 (23)	7:21.17 (7)	2:04.10 (14)	15:30.30 (11)
13	Claes Bengtsson	Sweden	173.171	40.37 (19)	7:27.55 (15)	2:03.59 (10)	15:37.00 (13)
14	Uwe Sauerteig	East Germany	174.023	41.04 (27)	7:26.28 (11)	2:05.82 (22)	15:28.30 (10)
15	Hans van Helden	France	174.046	41.22 (28)	7:19.31 (5)	2:04.29 (15)	15:49.30 (15)
16	Yep Kramer	Netherlands	183.953	51.14 *(31)	7:27.42 (14)	2:04.04 (12)	15:34.50 (12)
NC17	Andreas Dietel	East Germany	125.888	39.80 (9)	7:33.12 (23)	2:02.33 (5)	–
NC18	Masahiko Yamamoto	Japan	126.705	39.55 (7)	7:33.22 (24)	2:05.50 (21)	–
NC19	Hans Sture Magnusson	Sweden	126.721	40.25 (15)	7:29.41 (16)	2:04.59 (17)	–
NC20	Andreas Ehrig	East Germany	127.076	40.32 (18)	7:31.26 (19)	2:04.89 (19)	–
NC21	Jean Pichette	Canada	127.432	39.99 (11)	7:34.72 (25)	2:05.91 (23)	–
NC22	Nick Thometz	United States	127.472	38.77 (2)	7:41.76 (29)	2:07.58 (28)	–
NC23	Henning Kaarud	Norway	127.794	40.58 (22)	7:31.68 (21)	2:06.14 (25)	–
NC24	Masanori Takeshita	Japan	127.921	40.44 (20)	7:31.38 (20)	2:07.03 (27)	–
NC25	Pertti Niittylä	Finland	128.066	41.37 (29)	7:30.50 (18)	2:04.94 (20)	–
NC26	Øyvind Tveter	Norway	128.085	40.71 (24)	7:31.69 (22)	2:06.62 (26)	–
NC27	Andreas Lemcke	West Germany	128.596	40.88 (25)	7:36.83 (26)	2:06.10 (24)	–
NC28	Lee Yeong-ha	South Korea	129.199	40.02 (13)	7:43.19 (30)	2:08.58 (29)	–
NC29	Maurizio Marchetto	Italy	130.587	41.98 (30)	7:37.34 (28)	2:08.62 (30)	–
NC30	Guo Chengjiang	China	131.104	41.01 (26)	7:49.94 (31)	2:09.30 (31)	–
NC31	Mike Richmond	Australia	131.421	40.26 (16)	7:58.51 (32)	2:09.93 (32)	–
NC32	Yasuhiro Shimizu	Japan	137.911	51.52 *(33)	7:30.45 (17)	2:04.04 (12)	–
NC33	Antonio Gómez Fernandez	Spain	162.246	51.31 (32)	9:29.66 (33)	2:41.91 (33)	–

* = Fell

== Attribution ==
In Dutch
