= 1977 World Allround Speed Skating Championships =

International speed skating competition

1977 World Allround Speed Skating Championships for Men
- Venue: Thialf, Heerenveen, Netherlands
- Dates: 12–13 February
- Competitors: 32 skaters from 16 nations

Medalist men
| 1st place, gold medalist(s) | | Eric Heiden | USA |
| 2nd place, silver medalist(s) | | Jan Egil Storholt | NOR |
| 3rd place, bronze medalist(s) | | Sten Stensen | NOR |

The World Allround Speed Skating Championships for Men took place on 12 and 13 February 1977 in Heerenveen at the Thialf ice rink.

== Classification ==
| Rank | Skater | Country | Points Samalog | 500m | 5000m | 1500m | 10,000m |
|---|---|---|---|---|---|---|---|
| 1st place, gold medalist(s) | Eric Heiden | United States | 167.831 | 38.80 (gold) | 7:15.27 (9) | 2:01.66 (3) | 14:9.02 (3) |
| 2nd place, silver medalist(s) | Jan Egil Storholt | Norway | 168.003 | 39.42 (6) | 7:11.48 (4) | 2:01.29 (2) | 15:00.09 (4) |
| 3rd place, bronze medalist(s) | Sten Stensen | Norway | 168.196 | 40.03 (11) | 7:08.81 (2) | 2:02.54 (8) | 14:48.75 (gold) |
| 4 | Sergey Marchuk | Soviet Union | 168.759 | 40.01 (10) | 7:10.23 (3) | 2:02.72 (9) | 14:56.38 (2) |
| 5 | Kay Arne Stenshjemmet | Norway | 168.800 | 39.17 (3) | 7:12.86 (6) | 2:01.84 (4) | 15:14.61 (9) |
| 6 | Amund Martin Sjøbrend | Norway | 169.220 | 39.87 (9) | 7:11.74 (5) | 2:01.16 (gold) | 15:15.78 (10) |
| 7 | Hans van Helden | Netherlands | 169.668 | 40.32 (12) | 7:06.40 (gold) | 2:02.50 (7) | 15:17.50 (11) |
| 8 | Piet Kleine | Netherlands | 170.143 | 40.93 (19) | 7:14.27 (7) | 2:02.24 (6) | 15:00.77 (5) |
| 9 | Vladimir Lobanov | Soviet Union | 170.181 | 39.32 (5) | 7:17.21 (11) | 2:01.97 (5) | 15:29.66 (14) |
| 10 | Valeri Atlaskin | Soviet Union | 171.621 | 40.83 (17) | 7:16.93 (10) | 2:04.17 (12) | 15:14.16 (8) |
| 11 | Masayuki Kawahara | Japan | 171.881 | 40.53 (13) | 7:21.36 (12) | 2:03.73 (10) | 15:19.43 (12) |
| 12 | Klaas Vriend | Netherlands | 172.390 | 41.03 (20) | 7:15.10 (8) | 2:04.91 (14) | 15:24.25 (13) |
| 13 | Colin Coates | Australia | 172.850 | 41.08 (21) | 7:22.17 (13) | 2:05.62 (16) | 15:13.59 (7) |
| 14 | Viktor Lyoskin | Soviet Union | 173.288 | 41.54 (25) | 7:23.47 (14) | 2:05.62 (16) | 15:10.55 (6) |
| 15 | Herbert Schwarz | West Germany | 174.859 | 41.28 (23) | 7:23.84 (15) | 2:05.16 (15) | 15:49.50 (16) |
| 16 | Mike Woods | United States | 178.758 | 39.67 (8) | 7:24.80 (16) | 2:23.69* (31) | 15:34.22 (15) |
| NC17 | Klaus Wunderlich | East Germany | 126.434 | 40.58 (16) | 7:24.81 (17) | 2:04.12 (11) | – |
| NC18 | Lennart Carlsson | Sweden | 127.034 | 40.56 (15) | 7:24.94 (18) | 2:05.94 (18) | – |
| NC19 | Gaétan Boucher | Canada | 127.212 | 39.16 (2) | 7:45.32 (26) | 2:04.56 (13) | – |
| NC20 | Andreas Fischer | East Germany | 128.789 | 40.54 (14) | 7:35.69 (21) | 2:08.04 (23) | – |
| NC21 | Pertti Niittylä | Finland | 129.032 | 41.10 (22) | 7:36.92 (23) | 2:06.72 (20) | – |
| NC22 | Olavi Köppä | Finland | 129.601 | 41.35 (24) | 7:35.98 (22) | 2:07.96 (22) | – |
| NC23 | Ulf Berggren | Sweden | 129.791 | 41.70 (27) | 7:35.11 (20) | 2:07.74 (21) | – |
| NC24 | Maurizio Marchetto | Italy | 130.019 | 42.00 (29) | 7:32.62 (19) | 2:08.27 (25) | – |
| NC25 | Dan Immerfall | United States | 130.485 | 39.21 (4) | 8:10.45 (29) | 2:06.69 (19) | – |
| |NC26 | Gary Goplen | Canada | 130.916 | 41.73 (28) | 7:37.33 (24) | 2:10.36 (28) | – |
| NC27 | Mikio Oyama | Japan | 131.524 | 39.64 (7) | 8:11.41 (30) | 2:08.23 (24) | – |
| NC28 | Olivier Belle | France | 132.163 | 42.10 (30) | 7:51.70 (27) | 2:08.68 (26) | – |
| NC29 | Walter Birk | Switzerland | 132.182 | 41.60 (26) | 7:54.29 (28) | 2:09.46 (27) | – |
| NC30 | Geoff Sandys | United Kingdom | 132.907 | 42.23 (31) | 7:43.30 (25) | 2:13.04 (29) | – |
| NC31 | Antonio Gómez Fernandez | Spain | 166.687 | 53.94 (32) | 9:33.70 (31) | 2:46.13 (32) | – |
| NC | Alain Moechars | Belgium | 85.303 | 40.83 (17) | DQ | 2:13.42 (30) | – |

* = Fell
DQ = Disqualified

== Attribution ==
In Dutch
