= Peter Sinnerud =

Norwegian speed skater (1876–1972)

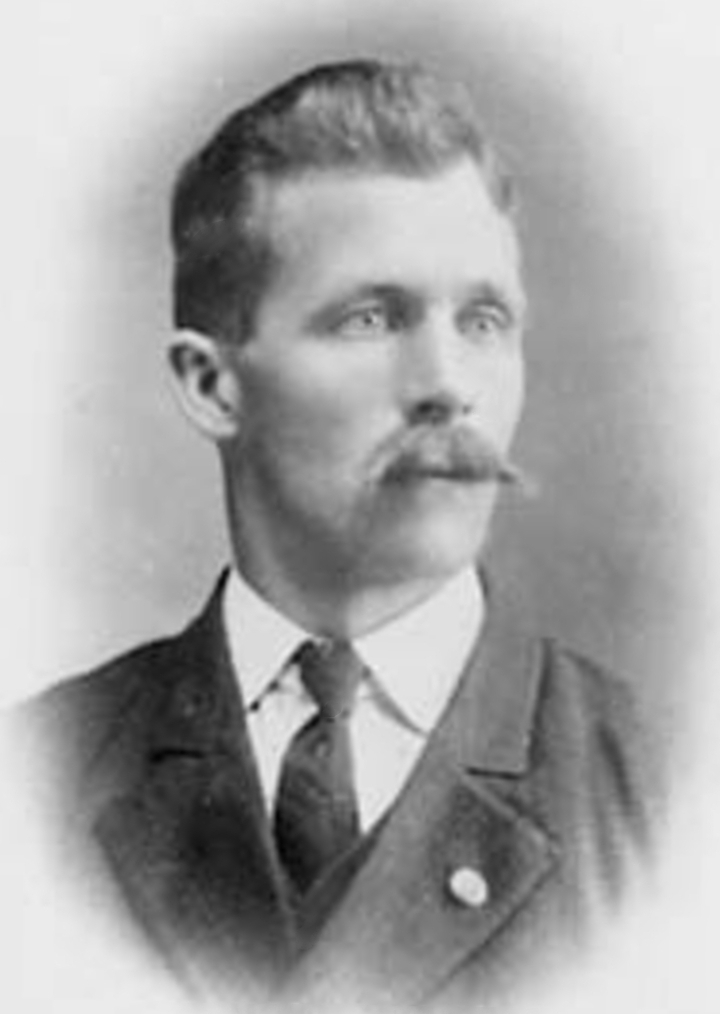

Personal information
- Born: 4 January 1876 Stange, Sweden-Norway
- Died: 22 March 1972 (aged 96) Hamar, Norway

Sport
- Sport: Speed skating
- Club: Hamar SK
Medal record
Representing Norway
World Championships
Silver medal – second place	1895 Hamar	Allround

Peter Sinnerud (4 January 1876 – 22 March 1972) was a Norwegian speed skater.

== Biography ==
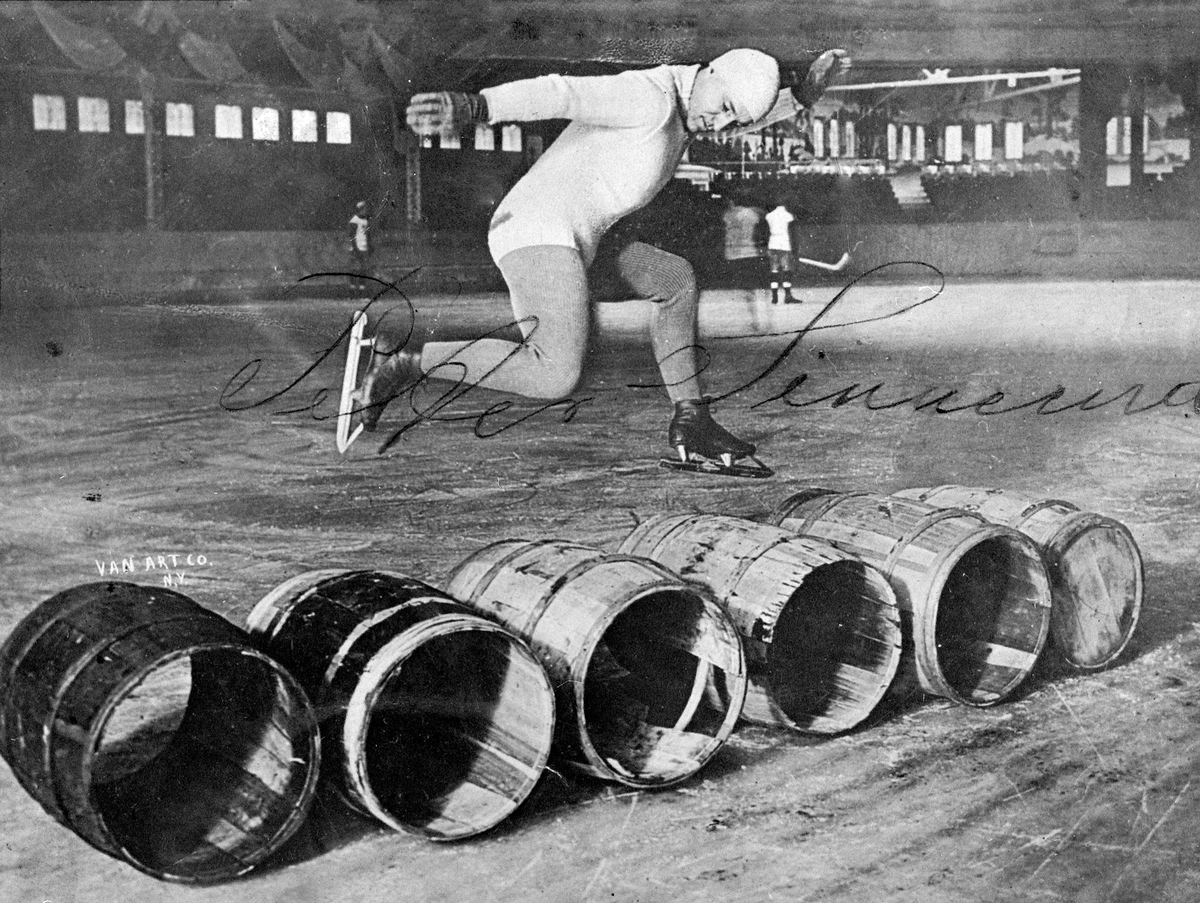
Sinnerud while training in the United States

At the 1895 World Allround Championships Sinnerud won a silver medal and set a world record over 10,000 m at 18:50.0, though later that day the gold medalist Jaap Eden broke that record by almost a minute. After that Sinnerud skated for 15 years in North America, winning six U.S. and Canadian titles in total. He returned to Norway for the 1904 world and national championships. He won both, but was later stripped of these titles because he participated in professional races in the U.S. (it is not known whether he was paid for that). Disappointed, Sinnerud returned to the U.S. and skated there professionally for several years, winning nothing, but placing within the podium in several races. Although Sinnerud was Norwegian he was often referred to in American newspapers by the nickname "The Terrible Swede" because of his speed and the Swedish–Norwegian Union.

In 1910 he returned to Norway for good and worked as a farmer outside of Hamar. He also converted his house into an accommodation and training center, becoming Norway's first speed skating coach. His trainees included Jan Langedijk, Klaas Schenk, Kees Broekman, Michael Staksrud, Reidar Liaklev and Hans Engnestangen.

Sinnerud was married to Astrid Margaretha Fjetre. He closed up his training center in 1956, after a sudden death of his son Arve at age 43. His grandson Sven Peter Sinnerud became a technician at the Vikingskipet, preparing ice for all championships conducted there since 1994.
