= 1912 World Allround Speed Skating Championships =

International speed skating competition

World Allround Speed Skating Championships
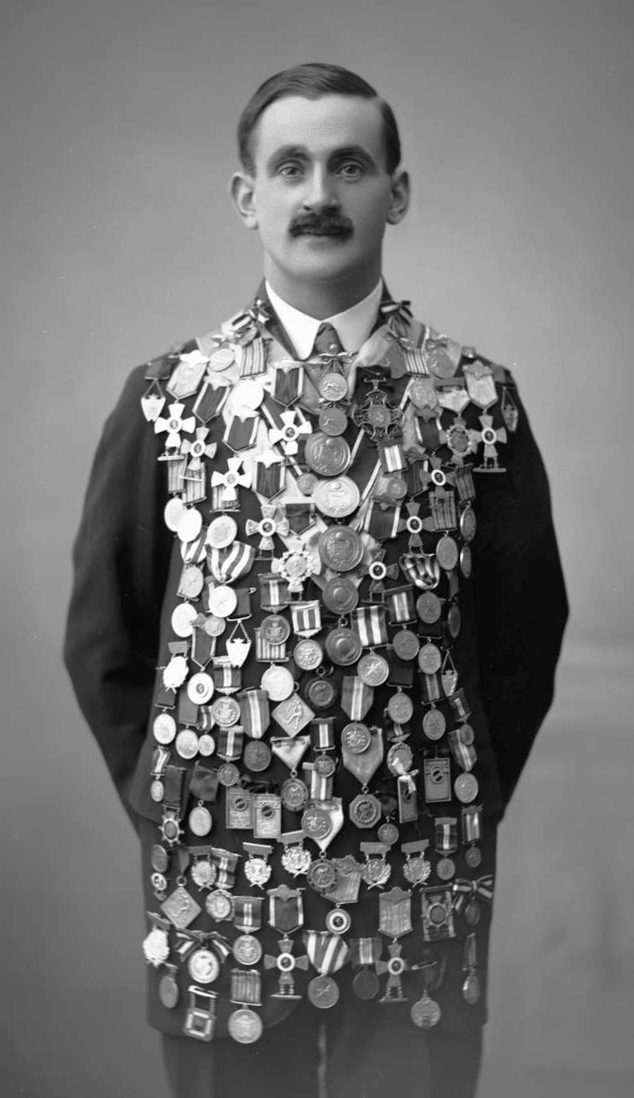
- Oscar Mathisen World champion 1912
- Venue: Gamle Frogner, Kristiania, Norway
- Dates: 17–18 February
- Competitors: 15 from 4 nations

Medalist men
1st place, gold medalist(s)		Oscar Mathisen	NOR
2nd place, silver medalist(s)		Gunnar Strömstén	FIN
3rd place, bronze medalist(s)		Trygve Lundgreen	NOR

The 1912 World Allround Speed Skating Championships took place at 17 and 18 February 1912 at the ice rink Gamle Frogner in Kristiania, Norway.

Nikolay Strunnikov was defending champion but did not take part in these championships. Oscar Mathisen had the lowest number of points awarded and won all four distances. He became World champion for the third time. He and Jaap Eden are the only ice-skaters winning the World championship three times (so far).

== Allround results ==
Place	Athlete	Country	Points	500m	5000m	1500m	10000m
1st place, gold medalist(s)	Oscar Mathisen	Norway	4	44.2 (1)	8:45.2 (1)	2:20.8 (1)	17:46.3 (1)
2nd place, silver medalist(s)	Gunnar Strömstén	Finland	10,5	47.0 (5)	8:53.3 (3)	2:26.1 (2)	18:13.3 (2)
3rd place, bronze medalist(s)	Trygve Lundgreen	Norway	12,5	47.0 (5)	8:52.5 (2)	2:27.3 (4)	18:15.3 (3)
4	Martin Sæterhaug	Norway	19	46.6 (3)	9:11.9 (7)	2:26.3 (3)	18:57.9 (7)
5	Ernst Cederlöf	Sweden	20	47.2 (7)	9:06.6 (4)	2:28.2 (5)	18:18.2 (6)
6	Stener Johannessen	Norway	22	48.1 (10)	9:07.1 (5)	2:28.3 (6)	18:16.8 (5)
7	Vasili Ippolitov	Russia	24,5	48.2 (11)	9:07.9 (6)	2:28.9 (7)	18:16.7 (4)
8	Einar Berntsen	Norway	31,5	48.2 (11)	9:27.7 (9)	2:32.4 (8)	19:16.4 (8)
9	Olaf Hansen	Norway	36	51.0 (14)	9:47.7 (11)	2:39.8 (13)	19:57.2 (9)
NC	Magnus Herseth	Norway	–	47.7 (9)	10:05.6 (14)	2:35.8 (11)	NF
NC	Thoralf Thoresen	Norway	–	47.5 (8)	9:47.6 (10)	2:35.2 (10)	NF
NC	Bjarne Frang	Norway	–	46.7 (4)	9:57.6 (13)	2:33.8 (9)	NS
NC	Reidar Gundersen	Norway	–	48.6 (13)	9:53.0 (12)	2:38.0 (12)	NS
NC	Henning Olsen	Norway	–	46.2 (2)	9:14.5 (8)	NS	NS
NC	Aksel Mathiesen	Norway	–	NF	NS	NS	NS

* = Fell
NC = Not classified
NF = Not finished
NS = Not started
DQ = Disqualified

Source: SpeedSkatingStats.com

== Rules ==
Four distances have to be skated:

- 500m
- 1500m
- 5000m
- 10000m

The ranking was made by award ranking points. The points were awarded to the skaters who had skated all the distances. The final ranking was then decided by ordering the skaters by lowest point totals.

- 1 point for 1st place
- 2 point for 2nd place
- 3 point for 3rd place
- and so on

One could win the World Championships also by winning at least three of the four distances, so the ranking could be affected by this.

Silver and bronze medals were awarded.
