= Franz Frederik Wathén =

Finnish speed skater

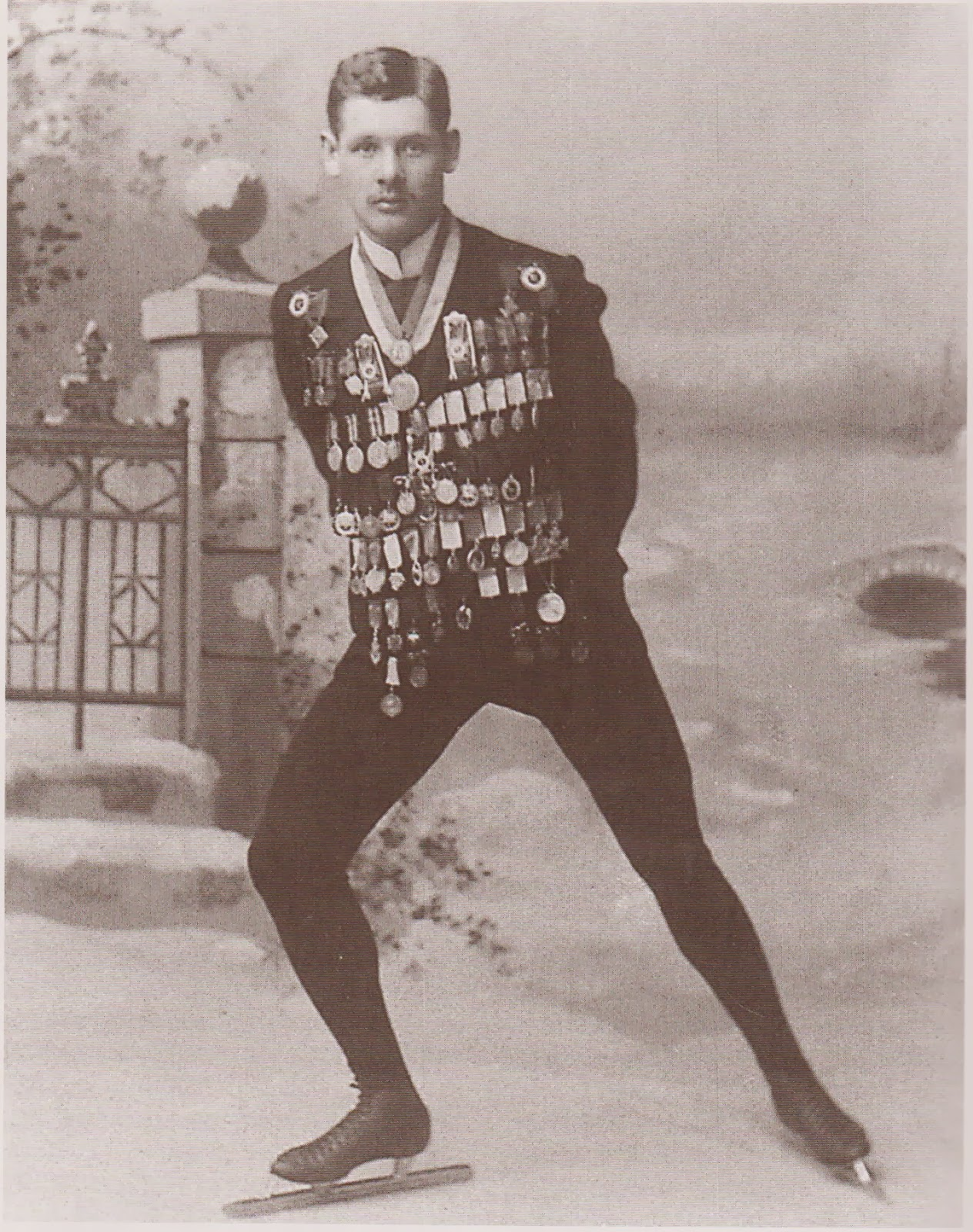
- Franz Frederik Wathén

Personal information
- Born: Franz Frederik Wathén; 30 March 1878 Helsinki, Finland
- Died: 21 October 1914 (aged 36) Helsinki, Finland

Sport
- Country: Finland
- Sport: Speed skating
Medal record
Representing Finland
Men's speed skating
World Allround Championships
Gold medal – first place	1891 Stockholm	Allround

Franz Frederik Wathén (30 March 1878 – 21 October 1914) was a Finnish speed skater.

Wathén became the first Finnish World Allround Champion in 1901 in Stockholm.

== Records ==
=== Personal bests ===
- 500 meter – 46,2
- 1500 meter – 2.30,8
- 5000 meter – 8.58,0
- 10000 meter – 18.44,0
