= 1889 World Allround Speed Skating Championships =

International speed skating competition

World Allround Speed Skating Championships
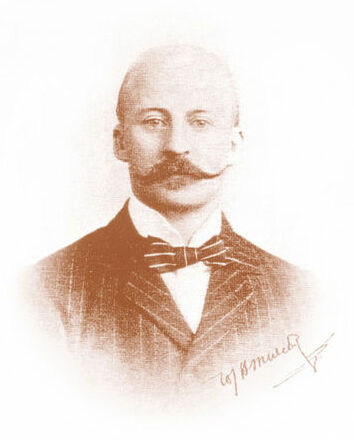
- Pim Mulier; Participant of the 1889 World Allround Championships
- Venue: Museumplein, Amsterdam, Netherlands
- Dates: 8–9 January
- Competitors: 22 from 4 nations

Medalist men
1st place, gold medalist(s)		None declared

The 1889 World Allround Speed Skating Championships took place at 8 and 9 January at the ice rink Museumplein in Amsterdam, Netherlands. It is the first World Allround Speed Skating Championships, it's unofficial because there was no International Skating Union (ISU is founded in 1892)

Three distances were skated at the World Championship, the ½ mile (850 meter), the 1 mile (1609 meter) and the 2 miles (3219 meter). One became champion if one won all three distances.

The Russian Aleksandr Pansjin didn't win the final at the 2 miles and was not declared as winner due to the rules.

== Allround results ==
Place	Athlete	Country	½ mile kwalification	½ mile skate-off	½ mile final	1 mile kwalification	1 mile final	2 mile kwalification	2 mile final
NC1	Aleksandr Panshin	Russia	1:24.6 (1)		1:25.6 (1)	2:59.0 (1)	2:58.6 (1)	6:31.6 (1)	6:31.0 (2)
NC2	Joe Donoghue	United States	1:35.0 (9)*			3:05.0 (2)	3:00.2 (2)	6:34.2 (2)	6:24.0 (1)
NC3	Klaas Pander	Netherlands	1:30.8 (2)		1:30.8 (2)	3:26.0 (11)		6:50.0 (4)	6:46.8 (4)
NC4	George Jurrjens	Netherlands	1:35.6 (10)			3:10.3 (3)	3:07.2 (3)	6:49.0 (3)	6:43.2 (3)
NC5	A. Couvée	Netherlands	1:33.0 (5)	1:32.2 (2)		3:19.0 (6)		7:04.8 (5)
NC6	Louis Tebbutt	United Kingdom	1:34.0 (7)			3:14.0 (4)	3:12.4 (4)	7:07.2 (6)
NC7	C. Venema	Netherlands	1:33.2 (6)			3:21.0 (9)		7:11.0 (7)*
NC8	G. van Blommestein	Netherlands	1:41.0 (19)			3:30.6 (16)		7:50.0 (9)
NC9	Jakob de Jong	Netherlands	1:40.0 (16)			3:30.2 (15)		7:35.2 (8)
NC	T. Vethake	Netherlands	1:44.0 (21)			3:39.8 (19)		NF
NC	D. Doijer	Netherlands	1:43.0 (20)			3:26.8 (12)		NF
NC	Charles Tebbutt	United Kingdom	1:33.0 (4)	1:32.0 (1)	NF	3:20.2 (8)		NS
NC	Pim Mulier	Netherlands	1:37.0 (12)			3:32.0 (18)		NS
NC	R. Broekmeijer	Netherlands	1:40.0 (16)			3:18.4 (5)		NS
NC	G. Green	United Kingdom	1:38.0 (15)			3:28.8 (14)		NS
NC	Willem van Vollenhoven	Netherlands	1:36.8 (11)			3:27.0 (13)		NS
NC	Wim de Boer	Netherlands	1:37.0 (12)			3:20.0 (7)		NS
NC	James Loveday	United Kingdom	1:34.4 (8)			NS		NS
NC	William Loveday	United Kingdom	1:32.0 (3)		1:34.0 (3)	3:21.6 (10)		NS
NC	J. van Vollenhoven	Netherlands	1:40.0 (16)			NS		NS
NC	Foeke Tjalma	Netherlands	1:37.0 (14)*			NS		NS
NC	P. Ruitinga	Netherlands	NF			3:31.0 (17)		NS

* = Fell
NC = Not classified
NF = Not finished
NS = Not started
DQ = Disqualified

Source: SpeedSkatingStats.com

== Rules ==
Three distances have to be skated:

- ½ mile (805 m)
- 1 mile (1609 m)
- 2 miles (3219 m)

One could only win the World Championships by winning at all three distances, so there would be no World Champion if no skater won all three distances.

The winner of the distances was decided by a final of the best four skaters of the distance. If the same time was skated a skate-off is skated to decide the ranking.

Silver and bronze medals were not awarded.
