= 1914 World Allround Speed Skating Championships =

International speed skating competition

World Allround Speed Skating Championships
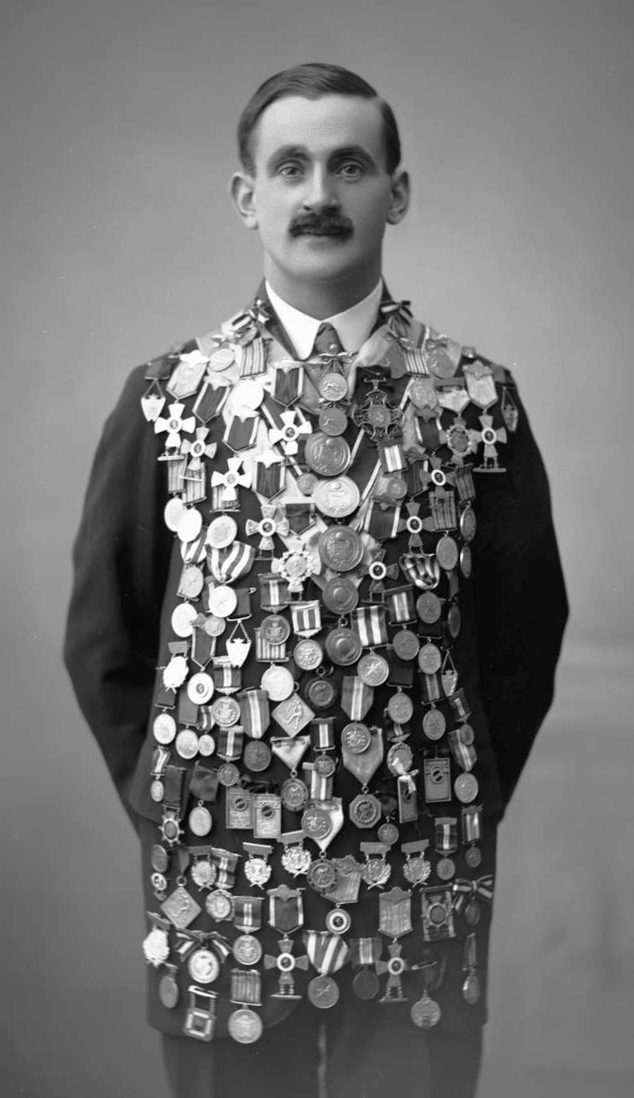
- Oscar Mathisen World champion 1914
- Venue: Frogner Stadion, Kristiania, Norway
- Dates: 14–15 February
- Competitors: 21 from 5 nations

Medalist men
| 1st place, gold medalist(s) | | Oscar Mathisen | NOR |
| 2nd place, silver medalist(s) | | Vasili Ippolitov | RUS |
| 3rd place, bronze medalist(s) | | Väinö Wickström | FIN |

The 1914 World Allround Speed Skating Championships took place at 14 and 15 February 1914 at the ice rink Frogner Stadion in Kristiania, Norway.

Oscar Mathisen was defending champion and succeeded in prolonging his title. Oscar Mathisen became World champion for the fifth time. He is together with Clas Thunberg and Sven Kramer holder of the record of fifth World Allround titles.

== Allround results ==
| Place | Athlete | Country | Points | 500m | 5000m | 1500m | 10000m |
|---|---|---|---|---|---|---|---|
| 1st place, gold medalist(s) | Oscar Mathisen | Norway | 6 | 45.3 (1) | 9:20.6 (1) | 2:26.1 (1) | 18:53.2 (3) |
| 2nd place, silver medalist(s) | Vasili Ippolitov | Russia | 9 | 47.7 (4) | 9:22.5 (2) | 2:29.3 (2) | 18:47.6 (1) |
| 3rd place, bronze medalist(s) | Väinö Wickström | Finland | 17 | 48.0 (6) | 9:27.0 (4) | 2:34.1 (5) | 18:52.2 (2) |
| 4 | Nikita Najdenov | Russia | 25.5 | 49.0 (10) | 9:28.9 (5) | 2:34.5 (7) | 19:01.2 (4) |
| 5 | Platon Ippolitov | Russia | 32 | 48.8 (8) | 9:26.9 (3) | 2:44.9 (19) | 19:05.7 (5) |
| 6 | Walter Tverin | Finland | 33 | 48.5 (7) | 9:43.0 (8) | 2:36.3 (9) | 19:32.6 (9) |
| 7 | Kristian Strøm | Norway | 34 | 50.0 (14) | 9:39.8 (6) | 2:34.4 (6) | 19:34.4 (10) |
| 8 | Bjarne Frang | Norway | 35 | 46.2 (2) | 9:52.2 (14) | 2:32.0 (3) | 20:34.4 (16) |
| 9 | Martin Sæterhaug | Norway | 35 | 47.5 (3) | 10:01.3 (16) | 2:34.0 (4) | 19:50.6 (12) |
| 10 | Julius Skutnabb | Finland | 36 | 50.8 (17) | 9:41.0 (7) | 2:37.2 (11) | 19:18.8 (6) |
| 11 | Thomas Bohrer | Austria | 40.5 | 47.8 (5) | 9:45.7 (9) | 2:38.3 (12) | 20:15.2 (15) |
| 12 | Sigurd Syversen | Norway | 41.5 | 49.2 (11) | 9:50.0 (13) | 2:34.5 (7) | 19:43.5 (11) |
| 13 | Trygve Lundgreen | Norway | 47 | 49.9 (13) | 9:46.8 (11) | 2:38.9 (13) | 19:51.4 (13) |
| 14 | Bror Ravander | Finland | 47 | 51.0 (18) | 9:45.7 (9) | 2:41.5 (16) | 19:27.3 (8) |
| 15 | Sverre Aune | Norway | 49 | 51.6 (20) | 9:47.3 (12) | 2:39.7 (15) | 19:26.8 (7) |
| 16 | Stener Johannessen | Norway | 56.5 | 51.0 (18) | 9:55.9 (15) | 2:39.3 (14) | 19:57.1 (14) |
| NC | Gunnar Schou | Norway | – | 49.5 (12) | 10:26.8 (20) | 2:36.5 (10) | NS |
| NC | Thorolf Hansen | Norway | – | 50.2 (15) | 10:27.8 (21) | 2:42.9 (17) | NS |
| NC | Gustaf Wiberg | Sweden | – | 50.2 (15) | 10:09.4 (18) | 2:43.8 (18) | NS |
| NC | Henning Olsen | Norway | – | 48.8 (8) | 10:20.6 (19) | NS | NS |
| NC | Paul Poss | Sweden | – | 51.8 (21) | 10:07.3 (17) | NS | NS |

* = Fell
NC = Not classified
NF = Not finished
NS = Not started
DQ = Disqualified

Source: SpeedSkatingStats.com

== Rules ==
Four distances have to be skated:

- 500m
- 1500m
- 5000m
- 10000m

The ranking was made by award ranking points. The points were awarded to the skaters who had skated all the distances. The final ranking was then decided by ordering the skaters by lowest point totals.

- 1 point for 1st place
- 2 point for 2nd place
- 3 point for 3rd place
- and so on

One could win the World Championships also by winning at least three of the four distances, so the ranking could be affected by this.

Silver and bronze medals were awarded.
