= 1894 World Allround Speed Skating Championships =

International speed skating competition

World Allround Speed Skating Championships
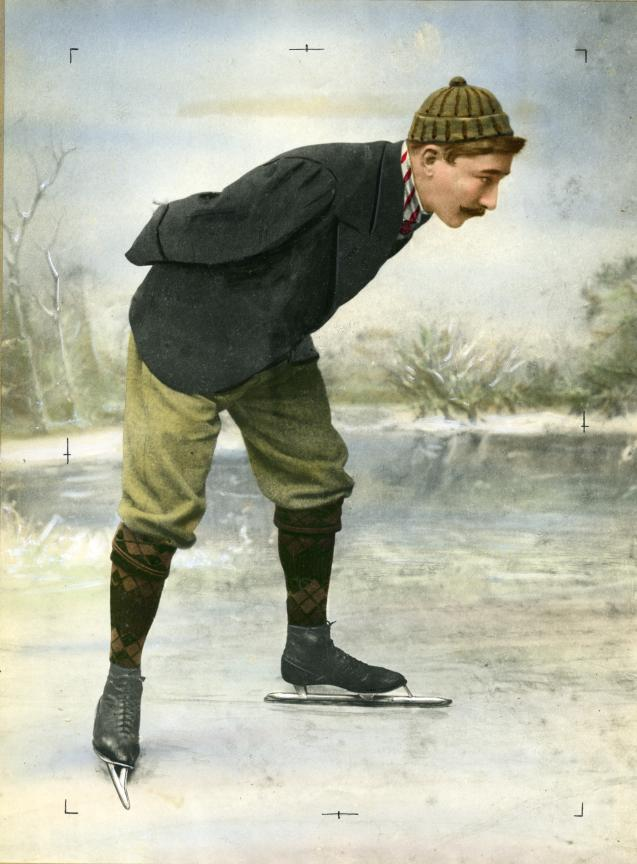
- Jaap Eden; First official ISU-World Champion
- Venue: Saltsjöbanen, Stockholm, Sweden
- Dates: 10–11 February
- Competitors: 19 from 6 nations

Medalist men
1st place, gold medalist(s)		Not declared

The 1894 World Allround Speed Skating Championships took place at 10 and 11 February 1894 at the ice rink Saltsjöbanen in Stockholm, Sweden. 19 skaters from six countries participated. It is the first World Allround Speed Skating Championships skated outside of Amsterdam. The Dutch skater Jaap Eden was the defending champion. No new champion was declared because none of the skaters won three distances.

== Allround results ==
Place	Athlete	Country	500m	500m final	5000m	1500m	1500m final	10000m
NC1	Halvdan Nielsen	Norway	54.4 (9)		10:01.0 (2)	2:56.8 (7)		19:43.8 (2)
NC2	Sergey Puresev	Russia	55.8 (12)		10:19.0 (3)	2:52.6 (5)		20:28.6 (4)
NC3	Frithjof Ericson	Sweden	56.6 (14)		10:21.6 (4)	3:02.4 (10)		20:08.8 (3)
NC4	Mauritz Callin	Sweden	53.4 (8)		10:22.6 (5)	3:06.2 (13)*		20:43.4 (6)
NC5	John Larsson	Sweden	55.0 (10)		10:49.2 (9)	2:58.8 (9)		20:35.0 (5)
NC6	Gustaf Johansson	Sweden	55.4 (11)		10:44.0 (8)	2:58.6 (8)		20:45.4 (7)
NC7	James Aveling	United Kingdom	56.0 (13)		11:02.8 (11)	3:06.8 (15)		21:51.0 (12)
NC8	Fredrik Gölin	Sweden	59.2 (17)		10:54.2 (10)	3:06.0 (12)		21:48.4 (11)
NC	Einar Halvorsen	Norway	51.8 (5)		9:32.0 (1)	2:45.8 (2)	2:35.6 (1)	NS
NC	Peder Østlund	Norway	51.0 (2)	52.2 (4)	10:25.6 (6)	2:48.4 (3)	2:48.2 (3)	NS
NC	Sven Bodee	Sweden	58.2 (16)		10:31.0 (7)	NF		20:55.0 (8)
NC	Josef Jahnzon	Sweden	1:04.8 (18)*		11:08.0 (11)	NS		NS
NC	Jaap Eden	Netherlands	51.4 (3)	50.4 (2)	NF	2:45.2 (1)	2:36.2 (2)	19:12.4 (1)
NC	Alfred Næss	Norway	50.4 (1)	51.4 (3)	NS	2:55.4 (6)		NS
NC	Oskar Fredriksen	Norway	51.4 (3)	50.4 (1)	NS	2:49.8 (4)	2:49.8 (4)	NF
NC	Gustaf Gustafsson	Sweden	52.2 (6)		NS	3:03.2 (11)		NS
NC	Helmer Langborg	Sweden	53.0 (7)		NS	NS		NS
NC	Johan Lindstedt	Finland	56.8 (15)		NS	3:06.2 (13)		21:17.6 (10)
NC	Gunnar Langborg	Sweden	NS		NS	NS		NF

* = Fell
NC = Not classified
NF = Not finished
NS = Not started
DQ = Disqualified

Source: SpeedSkatingStats.com

== Rules ==
Four distances had to be skated: 500, 1500, 5000 and 10,000 m. One could earn the world title only by winning at least three of the four distances, otherwise the title would be vacant. The winner of the 500 and 1500 meter was decided by a skate off of the best four skaters of the distance. Silver and bronze medals were not awarded.
