= 1891 World Allround Speed Skating Championships =

International speed skating competition

World Allround Speed Skating Championships
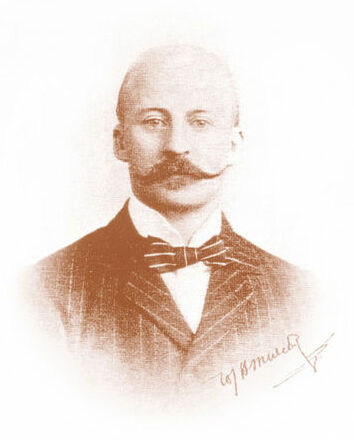
- Pim Mulier; Participant of the 1891 World Allround Championships
- Venue: Museumplein, Amsterdam, Netherlands
- Dates: 6–7 January
- Competitors: 15 from 3 nations

Medalist men
1st place, gold medalist(s)		Joe Donoghue	USA

The 1891 World Allround Speed Skating Championships took place at 6 and 7 January at the ice rink Museumplein in Amsterdam, Netherlands. It's an unofficial championship because there was no International Skating Union (ISU is founded in 1892)

Four distances were skated at the World Championship, the ½ mile (850 meter), the 1 mile (1609 meter), the 2 miles (3219 meter) and the 5 miles (8047 meter). One became champion if one won three of the four distances.

The American Joe Donoghue won all the four distances and became the first World allround champion.

== Allround results ==
Place	Athlete	Country	½ mile kwalification	½ mile final	1 mile	2 mile	5 mile
1st place, gold medalist(s)	Joe Donoghue	United States	1:25.4 (1)	1:25.6 (1)	6:10.8 (1)	3:00.4 (1)	16:02.2 (1)
NC2	Klaas Pander	Netherlands	1:34.0 (2)	1:30.2 (2)	6:38.6 (2)	3:11.2 (2)	17:04.0 (2)
NC3	August Underborg	German Empire	1:36.0 (4)	1:32.4 (4)	6:52.4 (4)	3:14.2 (3)	17:04.4 (3)
NC4	A.L. Couvée	Netherlands	1:36.6 (5)		7:19.4 (8)	3:18.0 (5)	17:04.8 (4)
NC5	Maurits Cartier van Dissel	Netherlands	1:37.0 (6)		6:52.2 (3)	3:27.4 (7)	17:56.0 (5)
NC6	G.J.M. Couvée	Netherlands	1:44.2 (9)		6:53.4 (5)	3:46.0 (10)	18:30.0 (8)
NC7	Willem de Boer	Netherlands	1:49.6 (10)		7:38.6 (9)	3:35.0 (9)	18:26.4 (7)
NC8	N.J. Kampers	Netherlands	1:52.4 (13)		7:19.4 (7)	3:29.0 (8)	18:13.0 (6)
NC9	Dirk Fenenga	Netherlands	1:55.2 (14)		8:27.4 (12)	3:56.4 (11)	20:54.0 (9)
NC	Jaap Houtman	Netherlands	1:40.0 (7)		7:04.4 (6)	3:21.0 (6)	NF
NC	C. Henny	Netherlands	2:02.0 (15)*		9:04.4 (13)	NF	NS
NC	Bernardus van Rijckevorsel	Netherlands	1:42.4 (8)		8:01.4 (11)	NS	NS
NC	Pim Mulier	Netherlands	1:51.6 (12)		7:34.4 (10)	NS	NS
NC	Jaap Eden	Netherlands	1:35.2 (3)	1:31.2 (3)	NS	3:15.2 (4)*	NS
NC	B.A. Jansen	Netherlands	1:49.6 (10)		NS	NS	NS

* = Fell
NC = Not classified
NF = Not finished
NS = Not started
DQ = Disqualified

Source: SpeedSkatingStats.com

== Rules ==
Four distances have to be skated:

- ½ mile (805 m)
- 1 mile (1609 m)
- 2 miles (3219 m)
- 5 miles (8047 meter)

One could only win the World Championships by winning at three of the four distances, so there would be no World Champion if no skater won three distances.

The winner of the ½ mile was decided by a final of the best four skaters of the distance. If the same time was skated a skate-off is skated to decide the ranking.

Silver and bronze medals were not awarded.
