= Dmitry Bochkaryov =

Soviet speed skater

Personal information
- Nationality: Russian
- Born: 28 December 1958 (age 67) Leningrad, Russian SFSR, Soviet Union

Sport
- Sport: Speed skating
Medal record
Representing Soviet Union
World Championships
Silver medal – second place	1982 Assen	Allround

Dmitry Yevgenyevich Bochkaryov (Russian: Дмитрий Евгеньевич Бочкарёв; born 28 December 1958 in Leningrad) is a former speed skater from the Soviet Union.

Bochkaryov's most notable feat was a silver medal at the 1982 World Allround Speed Skating Championships for Men in Assen, the Netherlands, behind Hilbert van der Duim. In 1981 he had already come close to a medal with a 4th place behind three Norwegian skaters in Oslo, while in 1983 he placed 5th, again in Oslo. In 1985 he became allround champion of the Soviet Union. He finished 6th at the 10.000 m event of the 1984 Winter Olympics in Sarajevo, but could only reach 17th place at the 5.000 m event at the 1988 Winter Olympics in Calgary.

== Personal records ==
Event	Result	Date	Venue	World Record
500 m	38.6	23 March 1981	Medeu	37.00
1,000 m	1:17.93	5 March 1982	Divnogorsk	1:13.39
1,500 m	1:55.63	25 December 1982	Medeu	1:54.79
3,000 m	4:03.98	28 March 1979	Medeu	4:06.91
5,000 m	6:50.83	17 March 1986	Medeu	6:49.15
10,000 m	14:12.81	28 December 1983	Medeu	14:23.59
Big combination	162.578	28 December 1983	Medeu	161.550

Twice his personal best was better than the official world record at the time, both times at the Medeu speed skating rink near Alma Ata, which in the early 80s was by far the fastest rink in the world.
Bochkaryov skated his personal best on the 3000 m (4:03.98) at the same event (the Soviet Cup on 28 March 1979 at Medeu) as Dmitry Ogloblin, who skated 4;04.06; however, since Bochkaryov skated in a quartet and Oglobin in a pair, only the second best time was recognized as the official new world record. In 2019, the latter is still Medeu's official track record. Medeu's unofficial track record is far lower; already in December 1973, Yuri Kondakov had set it at 4:03.67, while Sergey Marchuk skated a remarkable 3:56.65 there on March 11, 1977, an unofficial world record that stood until 1992.
At the Nikolay Kiselyov Memorial championships in December 1983, Bochkaryov was one of three skaters to skate below the world record on the 10,000 m of 14:23.59. Igor Malkov was the fastest with an extraordinary time of 13:54.81. None of these times were ever recognised as an official world record by the International Skating Union.

Bochkaryov has an Adelskalender score of 160.866 points. His highest ranking on the Adelskalender was second place behind Eric Heiden from 31 March 1981 until 1 April 1982.
