= 1895 World Allround Speed Skating Championships =

International speed skating competition

World Allround Speed Skating Championships
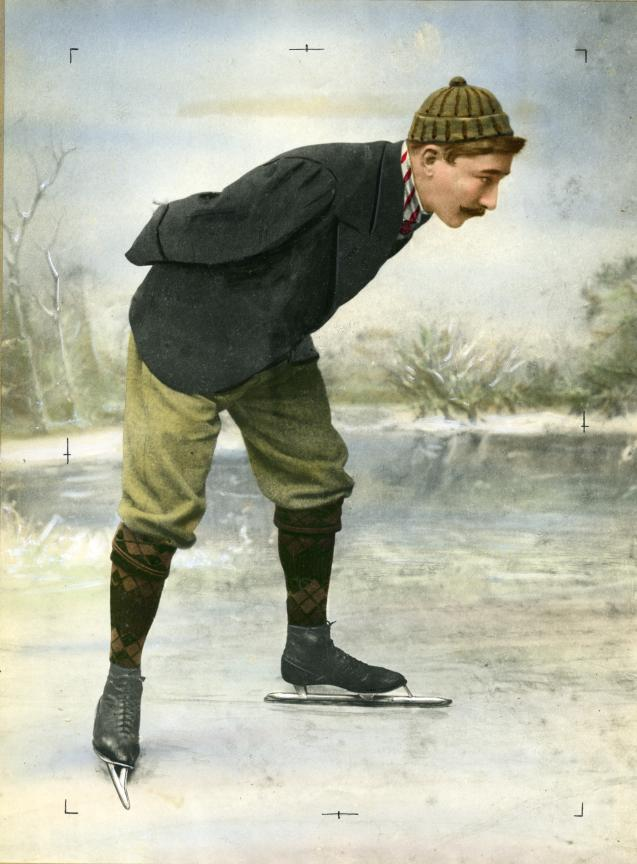
- Jaap Eden; First official ISU-World Champion
- Venue: Mjøsen, Hamar, Norway
- Dates: 23–24 February
- Competitors: 18 from 3 nations

Medalist men
1st place, gold medalist(s)		Jaap Eden	NED

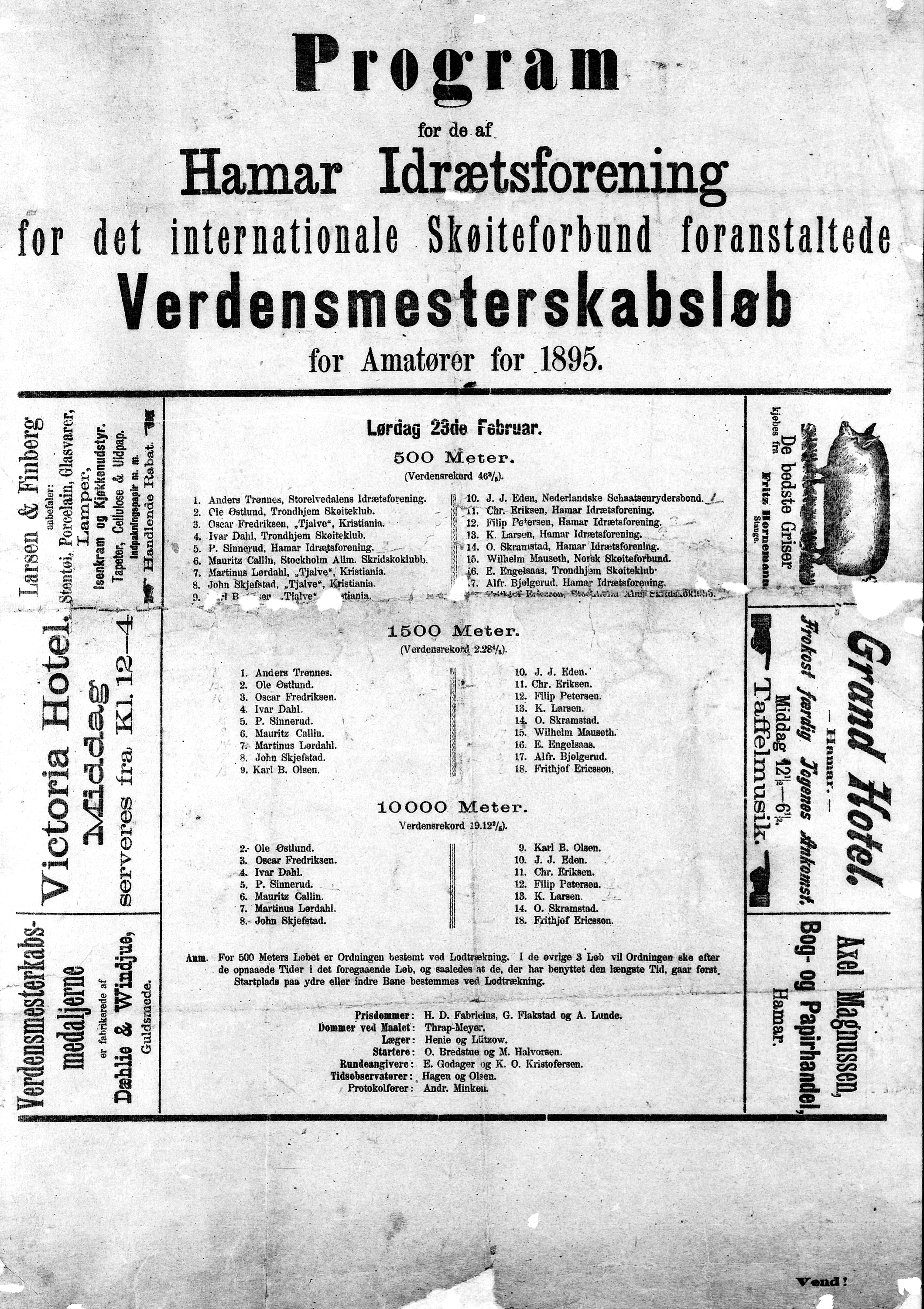
Official program

The 1895 World Allround Speed Skating Championships took place at 23 and 24 February 1895 at the ice rink Mjøsen in Hamar, Norway. There was no defending champion. In 1894 no champion was declared because none of the skaters won three distances. Jaap Eden became the first skater to win two world titles.

== Allround results ==
Place	Athlete	Country	500m	500m final	5000m	1500m	1500m final	10000m
1st place, gold medalist(s)	Jaap Eden	Netherlands	48.2 (1)	48.4 (2)	8:41.0 (1)	2:25.4 (1)	2:25.4 (1)	17:56.0 (1)
NC2	Peter Sinnerud	Norway	49.4 (4)	48.6 (3)	9:23.4 (4)	2:40.2 (8)		18:50.0 (2)
NC3	Karenus Larsen-Stai	Norway	50.6 (8)		9:13.2 (2)	2:40.0 (7)		18:50.0 (2)
NC4	Filip Petersen	Norway	50.6 (8)		9:16.2 (3)	2:37.0 (3)	2:37.2 (4)	19:05.4 (4)
NC5	Ole Østlund	Norway	50.4 (7)		9:34.2 (8)	2:39.8 (6)		19:42.6 (7)
NC6	Frithjof Ericson	Sweden	53.4 (13)		9:29.8 (5)	2:46.4 (13)		19:13.4 (5)
NC7	Mauritz Callin	Sweden	51.0 (10)		9:48.6 (10)	2:45.0 (10)		19:57.6 (8)
NC8	Iver Dahl	Norway	53.8 (15)		9:37.4 (9)	2:48.2 (14)		19:41.2 (6)
NC9	Christian Theodor Eriksen	Norway	53.4 (13)		10:01.2 (12)	2:49.8 (15)		20:40.8 (10)
NC10	Oscar Skramstad	Norway	55.2 (16)		9:51.0 (11)	3:04.2 (18)		20:20.0 (9)
NC	Martinus Lørdahl	Norway	50.0 (5)		10:24.8 (14)	2:39.4 (5)		NF
NC	Oskar Fredriksen	Norway	49.0 (3)	48.2 (1)	9:30.6 (6)	2:38.8 (4)	2:36.2 (3)	NS
NC	Edvard Engelsaas	Norway	51.6 (11)		9:32.0 (7)	2:41.6 (9)		NS
NC	Alfred Bjølgerud	Norway	55.4 (17)		10:16.8 (13)	2:53.4 (17)		NS
NC	Karl Bernhard Olsen	Norway	50.2 (6)		NS	2:45.4 (12)		NF
NC	Wilhelm Mauseth	Norway	48.8 (2)	48.6 (3)	NS	2:34.6 (2)	2:35.2 (2)	NS
NC	John Skjefstad	Norway	52.2 (12)		NS	2:45.0 (10)		NS
NC	Anders Trønnes	Norway	NF		NS	2:52.0 (16)		NS

* = Fell
NC = Not classified
NF = Not finished
NS = Not started
DQ = Disqualified

Source: SpeedSkatingStats.com

== Rules ==
Four distances had to be skated: 500, 1500, 5000 and 10,000 m. One could earn the world title only by winning at least three of the four distances, otherwise the title would be vacant. The winner of the 500 and 1500 meter was decided by a skate off of the best four skaters of the distance. Silver and bronze medals were not awarded.
