= 1893 World Allround Speed Skating Championships =

International speed skating competition

World Allround Speed Skating Championships
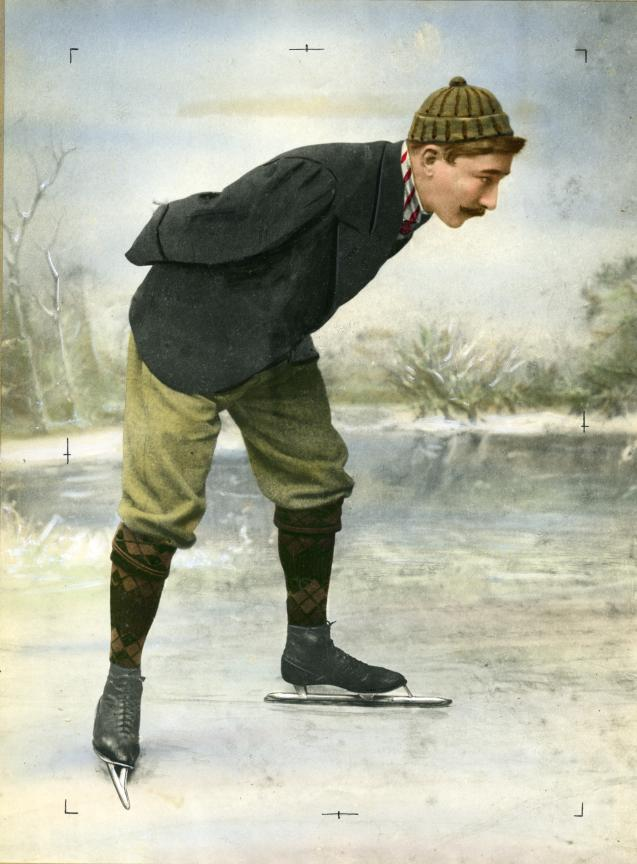
- Jaap Eden; First official ISU-World Champion
- Venue: Museumplein, Amsterdam, Netherlands
- Dates: 13–14 January
- Competitors: 17 from 4 nations

Medalist men
1st place, gold medalist(s)		Jaap Eden	NED

The 1893 World Allround Speed Skating Championships took place at 13 and 14 January at the ice rink Museumplein in Amsterdam, the Netherlands. It is the fourth World Allround Speed Skating Championships organised at the Museumplein in Amsterdam. (The championships in 1892 were canceled due to thaw). It was the first official World Allround Speed Skating Championship after the foundation of the International Skating Union (ISU) in 1892. The Dutch skater Jaap Eden became the first official ISU-World allround by winning the 1500, 5000 en 500 meter. He did not need to finish the 10000m according to the rules. Oskar Fredriksen from Norway skated the championship the first World record at the 10000 meter.

== Allround results ==
Place	Athlete	Country	1500m	1500m final	5000m	500m	500m final	10000m
1st place, gold medalist(s)	Jaap Eden	Netherlands	2:49.2 (1)	2:48.2 (1)	9:59.0 (1)	51.2 (2)	51.2 (1)	NF
NC2	Rudolf Ericson	Sweden	2:54.0 (4)	2:59.2 (3)	10:36.8 (3)	52.2 (4)	52.2 (4)	21:13.0 (2)
NC3	Filip Petersen	Norway	2:58.2 (7)		10:31.4 (2)	54.0 (7)		21:23.4 (3)
NC4	Julius von Salzen	German Empire	2:58.0 (5)		11:15.0 (5)	53.2 (5)		22:23.4 (4)
NC5	Maurits Cartier van Dissel	Netherlands	3:18.0 (9)		11:24.4 (6)	59.6 (11)		23:04.0 (5)
NC6	Wim de Boer	Netherlands	3:21.0 (11)		11:38.2 (8)	59.0 (10)		23:39.2 (6)
NC7	Jan Vervoort	Netherlands	3:28.4 (12)		11:57.6 (10)	1:01.0 (13)		23:57.0 (9)
NC8	Willem Gronert	Netherlands	3:38.4 (15)		11:52.0 (9)	1:01.2 (14)		23:45.0 (7)
NC	N.N.	Netherlands	NS		NS	1:00.6 (12)		NF
NC	Einar Halvorsen	Norway	2:52.6 (3)	3:01.0 (4)	10:43.0 (4)	51.0 (1)	52.0 (2)	NS
NC	Oskar Fredriksen	Norway	2:49.2 (1)	2:55.0 (2)	NF	52.0 (3)	52.0 (3)	20:21.4 (1) WR
NC	Bernhard Bruzelius	Sweden	2:58.0 (5)		NF	55.0 (8)		NS
NC	Dirk de Koe	Netherlands	3:28.4 (12)		11:31.0 (7)	NS		NS
NC	J. Schoenmaker	Netherlands	3:31.4 (14)*		12:06.0 (11)	NS		NS
NC	R. Damste	Netherlands	3:40.4 (16)		12:54.0 (12)	NS		NS
NC	Albert de Wely	Netherlands	3:09.8 (8)		NS	53.8 (6)		23:52.0 (8)
NC	Hector van Sminia	Netherlands	3:18.6 (10)		NS	58.0 (9)		25:00.0 (10)

* = Fell
NC = Not classified
NF = Not finished
NS = Not started
DQ = Disqualified

Source: SpeedSkatingStats.com

== Rules ==
Four distances had to be skated: 500, 1500, 5000 and 10,000 m. One could earn the world title only by winning at least three of the four distances, otherwise the title would be vacant. The winner of the 500 and 1500 meter was decided by a skate off of the best four skaters of the distance. Silver and bronze medals were not awarded.
