= 1896 World Allround Speed Skating Championships =

1896 edition of the World Allround Speed Skating Championships

World Allround Speed Skating Championships
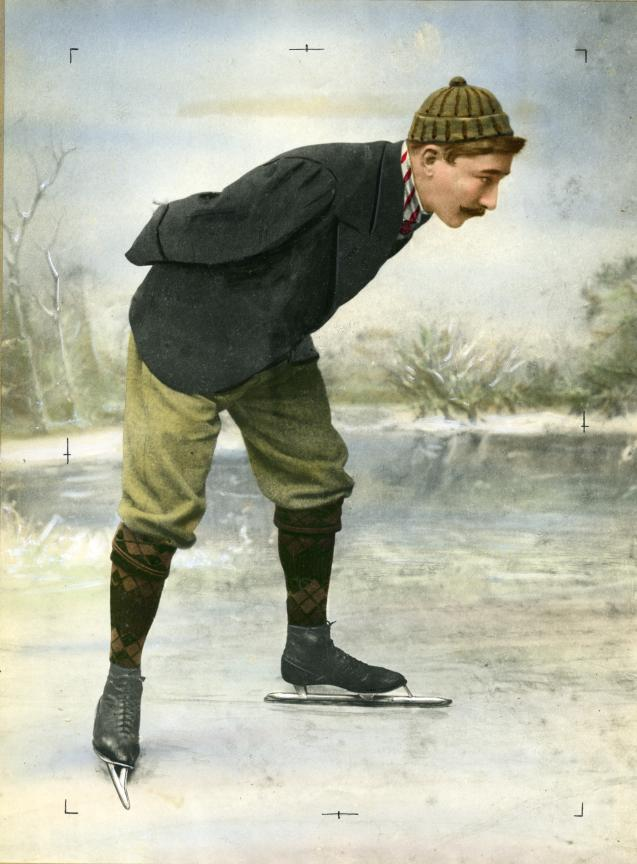
- Jaap Eden; First official ISU-World Champion
- Venue: Joesoepovski Park, Saint Petersburg, Russian Empire
- Dates: 7–8 February
- Competitors: 14 from 4 nations

Medalist men
1st place, gold medalist(s)		Jaap Eden	NED

The 1896 World Allround Speed Skating Championships took place at 7 and 8 February 1896 at the ice rink Joesoepovski Park in Saint Petersburg, Russia. Jaap Eden was the defending champion, he extended his title by winning all four distances.

== Allround results ==
Place	Athlete	Country	500m	5000m	1500m	10000m
1st place, gold medalist(s)	Jaap Eden	Netherlands	50.2 (1)	9:03.2 (1)	2:36.2 (1)	18:52.4 (1)
NC2	Gustaf Estlander	Finland	53.8 (3)	9:42.4 (2)	2:44.2 (2)	19:57.4 (2)
NC3	Johan Wink	Finland	55.0 (7)	9:48.6 (3)	2:54.4 (6)	20:12.2 (3)
NC4	Nikolay Fyodorov	Russia	1:00.8 (10)	11:01.2 (8)	3:12.6 (11)	23:11.6 (5)
NC	N. Obukhov	Russia	58.8 (9)	10:59.0 (7)	3:08.2 (10)	NF
NC	Sergey Muller	Russia	54.2 (4)	10:03.2 (4)	2:49.2 (4)	NS
NC	V. Gumbin	Russia	1:03.2 (11)	11:19.8 (9)	3:18.2 (12)	NS
NC	A. Nikolayev	Russia	56.6 (8)	NS	NF	NS
NC	Eduard Vollenveyder	Russia	54.6 (5)	NS	NS	NS
NC	Aleksandr Papikin	Russia	52.8 (2)	NS	2:54.4 (6)	NS
NC	Pyotr Kusminski	Russia	54.8 (6)	NS	2:53.2 (5)	NS
NC	M. Pfeffer	Russia	NF	10:48.0 (6)	3:02.6 (9)	NS
NC	Julius Seyler	German Empire	NS	NS	2:44.2 (2)	NS
NC	H. Roos	Russia	NS	10:12.6 (5)	2:56.0 (8)	21:05.6 (4)

* = Fell
NC = Not classified
NF = Not finished
NS = Not started
DQ = Disqualified

Source: SpeedSkatingStats.com

== Rules ==
Four distances had to be skated: 500, 1500, 5000 and 10,000 m. One could earn the world title only by winning at least three of the four distances, otherwise the title would become vacant. Silver and bronze medals were not awarded.
