= Robert Merkulov =

Soviet speed skater (1931–2022)

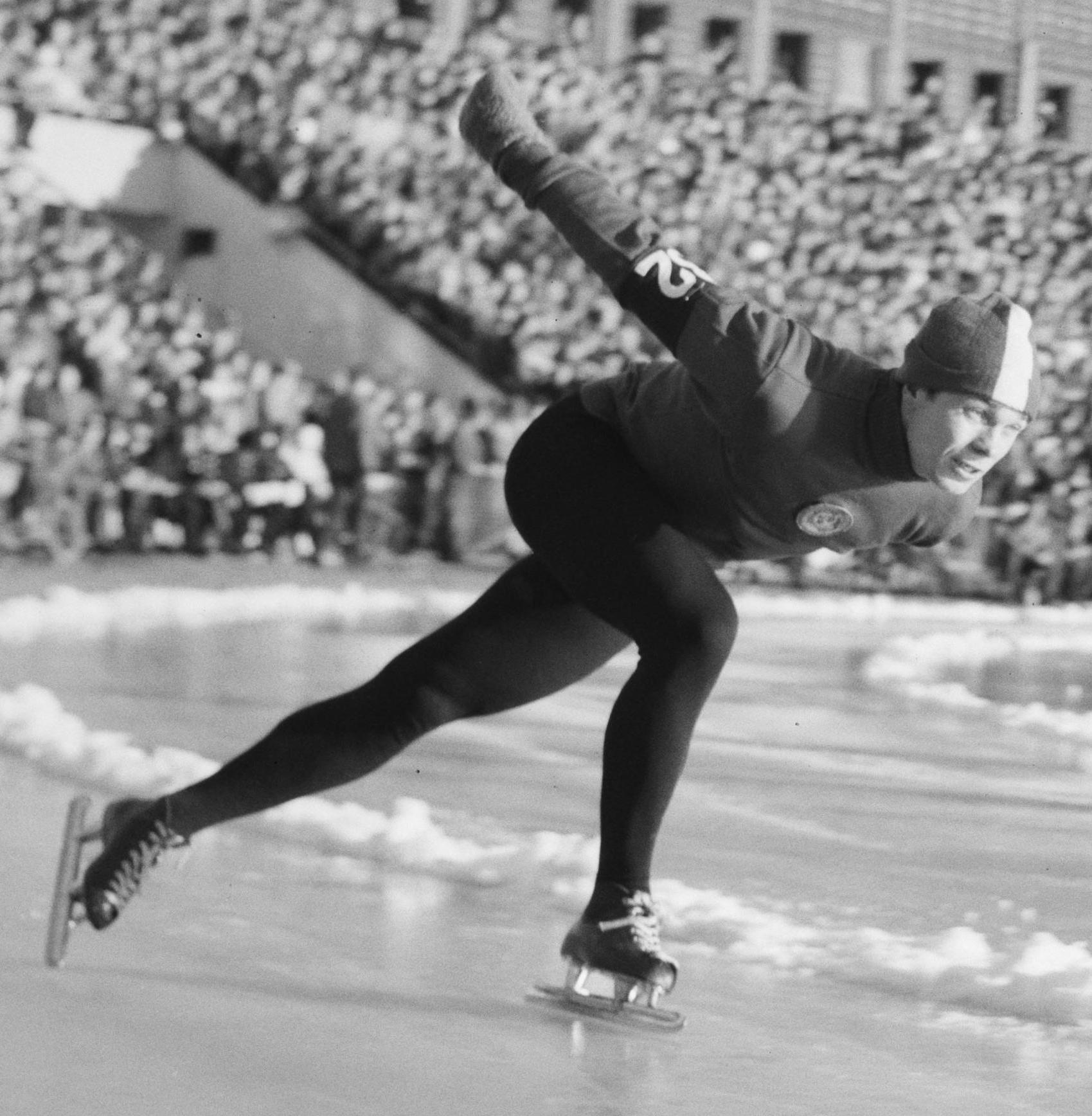

Personal information
- Born: August 9, 1931 Moscow, USSR
- Died: November 6, 2022 (aged 91)

Sport
- Country: Soviet Union
- Sport: Speed skating

Achievements and titles
- Olympic finals: 1956 Winter Olympics

Robert Viktorovich Merkulov (Russian: Роберт Викторович Меркулов, 9 August 1931 – 6 November 2022) was a Russian speed skater who competed for the Soviet Union in the 1956 Winter Olympics. He was born in Moscow. In 1956 he finished fifth in the 1500 metres event.

Merkulov died on 6 November 2022, at the age of 91.
