= 1890 World Allround Speed Skating Championships =

International speed skating competition

World Allround Speed Skating Championships
- Venue: Museumplein, Amsterdam, Netherlands
- Dates: 3-4 January
- Competitors: 17 from 5 nations

Medalist men
1st place, gold medalist(s)		None declared

The 1890 World Allround Speed Skating Championships took place at 3 and 4 January at the ice rink Museumplein in Amsterdam, Netherlands. It's an unofficial championship because the ISU was founded in 1892.

Four distances were skated at the World Championship, the ½ mile (805 meter), the 1 mile (1609 meter), the 2 miles (3219 meter) and the 5 miles (8047 meter). One became champion if one won three of the four distances.

The Norwegian Adolf Norseng did not become World Champion because he only won two distances of the four. He skated the fastest ½ mile in qualifying but finished second in the final.

== Allround results ==
Place	Athlete	Country	½ mile qualifying	½ mile final	1 mile	2 mile	5 mile
NC1	Adolf Norseng	Norway	1:22.4 (1)	1:24.6 (2)	3:07.0 (2)	6:25.0 (1)	16:48.4 (1)
NC2	George Jurrjens	Netherlands	1:31.2 (6)		3:15.0 (3)	6:53.0 (3)	18:33.4 (2)
NC3	Fritz Ahrendt	German Empire	1:31.4 (7)		3:34.6 (6)	7:20.8 (5)	19:38.4 (3)
NC	Klaas Pander	Netherlands	1:22.6 (2)	1:24.4 (1)*	3:06.0 (1)	6:33.4 (2)	NS
NC	Jaap Houtman	Netherlands	1:30.8 (5)		3:20.0 (4)	7:09.0 (4)	NS
NC	N.J. Kampers	Netherlands	1:45.0 (10)		NS	NS	20:40.0 (4)
NC	Willem de Boer	Netherlands	1:37.0 (9)		NS	NS	NS
NC	Aleksandr Panshin	Russia	1:26.0 (3)	1:26.0 (3)	NS	NS	NS
NC	Even Godager	Norway	1:26.8 (4)	1:27.0 (4)	NS	NS	NS
NC	Foeke Tjalma	Netherlands	1:31.6 (8)		NS	NS	NS
NC	J.E. Jurrjens	Netherlands	2:02.0 (11)*		NS	NS	NS
NC	A.L. Couvée	Netherlands	NF		NS	NS	NS
NC	G.J.M. Couvée	Netherlands	NF		NS	NS	NS
NC	C.F. Jibbens	Netherlands	NF		NS	NS	NS
NC	Charles Tebbutt	United Kingdom	NS		3:25.6 (5)	NF	NS
NC	Rosenau	Netherlands	NS		NS	NS	NS
NC	Verspijck	Netherlands	NS		NS	NS	NS

* = Fell
NC = Not classified
NF = Not finished
NS = Not started
DQ = Disqualified

Source: SpeedSkatingStats.com

== Rules ==
Four distances have to be skated:

- ½ mile (805 m)
- 1 mile (1609 m)
- 2 miles (3219 m)
- 5 miles (8047 m)

One could only win the World Championships by winning at three of the four distances, so there would be no World Champion if no skater won three distances.

The winner of the ½ mile was decided by a final of the best four skaters of the distance. If the same time was skated a skate-off is skated to decide the ranking.

Silver and bronze medals were not awarded.
