= Joe Donoghue =

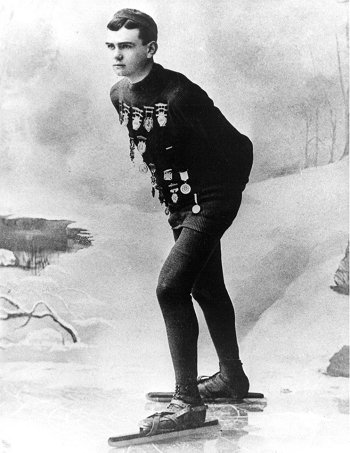

Personal information
- Born: February 11, 1871 Newburgh, New York, United States
- Died: April 1, 1921 (aged 50) New York City, New York, United States

Sport
- Country: United States
- Sport: Speed skating
Medal record
Men's speed skating
Representing the United States
World Allround Championships
Gold medal – first place	1891 Amsterdam	Allround

Joseph F. Donoghue (February 11, 1871 – April 1, 1921) was an American speed skater. He became the speed skating World Champion in 1891 and was a member of the Manhattan Athletic Club.

== Biography ==
Joe Donoghue skated on ice-skates with longer irons than did the other skaters in his time. This gave him an advantage because he did not need to swing with his arms.

Joe Donoghue came from a family of skaters. His father Timothy Donoghue was an American champion in 1864 and a pioneer skate designer, and of his sons Timothy Jr, Joe and James competed as speed skaters. In 1889, at age 18, Joe Donoghue traveled to Russia where he raced against the Russian champion Alexander Panshin.

Timothy Donoghue Sr on skating techniques in windy or windless conditions and the difference between Joe Donoghue's and Alexander Panshin's skating in the February 10, 1889 issue of the Pittsburg Dispatch (page 11):

"A good skater will always have the wind against him, for he goes faster than an ordinary breeze. Going before the wind a man can make 33 per cent better time than on a calm day. When the wind is against a man it is desirable to present as little surface to it as possible. For this reason I have taught the boys to skate with their arms folded behind them. With our long skate we make long strokes. Von Panschin, in spite of his size, makes 30 strokes to Joe's 20 while they are skating."

== World records ==
Distance	Distance	Date	Location
Hour record	26292m	January 26, 1893	(United Kingdom); Stamford

Source: SpeedSkatingStats.com
