= 1901 World Allround Speed Skating Championships =

International speed skating competition

World Allround Speed Skating Championships
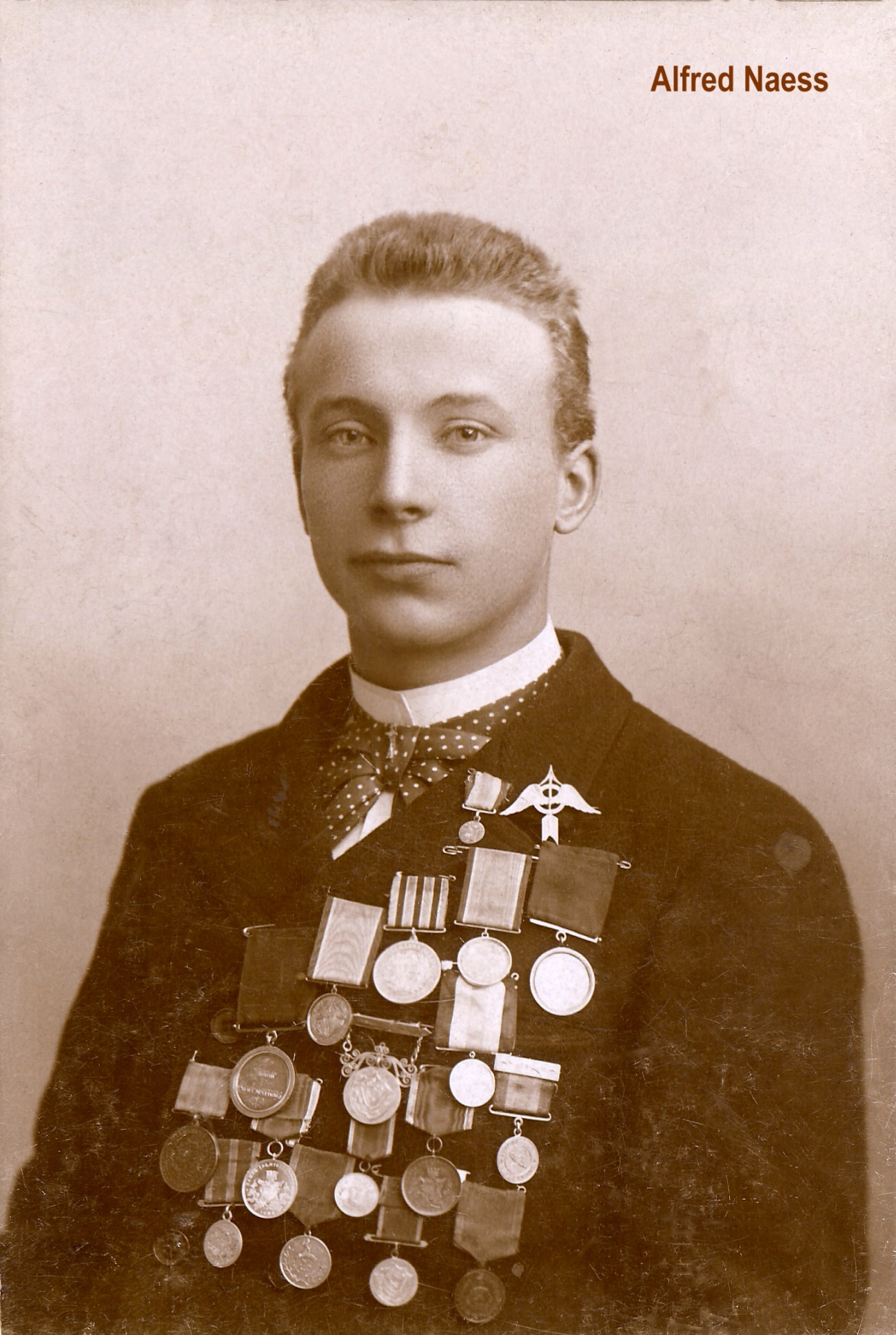
- Alfred Naess; Participated in the 1901 World Championship
- Venue: Djurgårdsbrunnsviken, Stockholm, Sweden
- Dates: 9–10 February
- Competitors: 13 from 4 nations

Medalist men
1st place, gold medalist(s)		Franz Wathén	FIN

The 1901 World Allround Speed Skating Championships took place on 9 and 10 February 1901 at the ice rink Djurgårdsbrunnsviken in Stockholm, Sweden.

Edvard Engelsaas was the defending champion, who was not there to defend his championship. The Fin Franz Wathén won three distances and became the new World champion.

== Allround results ==
Place	Athlete	Country	500m	5000m	1500m	10000m
1st place, gold medalist(s)	Franz Wathén	Finland	54.0 (1)	10:15.2 (3)	2:43.4 (1)	20:13.2 (1)
NC2	Rudolf Gundersen	Norway	1:04.0 (10)*	9:56.8 (1)	2:44.8 (2)	20:47.0 (3)
NC3	Gustaf Sörman	Sweden	1:01.0 (9)	10:53.0 (7)	2:51.8 (5)	22:36.4 (6)
NC	Josef Jahnzon	Sweden	57.0 (5)	10:49.6 (6)	2:56.4 (7)	NS
NC	Martinus Lørdahl	Norway	54.2 (2)	10:15.2 (3)	2:46.6 (3)	NS
NC	Walter Johansson	Norway	55.2 (4)	10:18.0 (5)	2:54.2 (6)	NS
NC	Jan Greve	Netherlands	57.2 (6)	10:07.2 (2)	NF	20:37.0 (2)
NC	Fredrik Sjöqvist	Sweden	1:00.2 (8)	11:22.0 (8)	NS	NS
NC	David Jahrl	Sweden	54.8 (3)	2:48.8 (4)	21:04.2 (4)
NC	Ernst Johansson	Sweden	58.2 (7)	NF	NF	NS
NC	Ernst Ehrnström	Sweden	1:04.8 (11)	NS	NS	NS
NC	Karl Olofsson	Sweden	NF	NS	3:05.0 (8)	NS
NC	Gösta Smitt	Sweden	NS	NS	3:06.8 (9)	22:17.0 (5)

* = Fell
NC = Not classified
NF = Not finished
NS = Not started
DQ = Disqualified

Source: SpeedSkatingStats.com

== Rules ==
Four distances have to be skated:

- 500m
- 1500m
- 5000m
- 10000m

One could only win the World Championships by winning at least three of the four distances, so there would be no World Champion if no skater won at least three distances.

Silver and bronze medals were not awarded.
