= Klaas Vriend =

Dutch speed skater (1952–2019)

- Klaas Vriend in 1979

Personal information
- Born: 12 June 1952 Grootebroek, North Holland, Netherlands
- Died: 12 June 2019 (aged 67) Enkhuizen, North Holland, Netherlands
- Years active: 1972–1981

Sport
- Sport: Speed skating
- Events: Long-track speed skating Marathon speed skating

Klaas Vriend (8 June 1952 – 12 June 2019) was a Dutch long-track speed skater.

He was a cauliflower grower's son. He was married to Gerie Jonkman, and they had three children, one of whom, however, only lived for one day. Jonkman would often accompany him to his competitions. Initially, Vriend worked in his father's business, growing cauliflower in the summer and ice skating in the winter, which resulted in him developing a weak back. Furthermore, he was prone to influenza and suffered from extreme nervousness whenever he stood at the starting line. Later in life, around 1976, he started his own business, and subsequently, he worked for the seed company Royal Sluis.

Vriend's role model in speed skating was Ard Schenk; he himself faced opponents such as Hans van Helden, Piet Kleine, and younger skaters like Hilbert van der Duim, Yep Kramer, and Eric Heiden.

Vriend's name as a speed skater appears in the national press beginning in 1968 (Delpher, accessed March 15, 2026). From that point on, he competed in race after race, often finishing in second place (in 1969, he was even dubbed the "perennial runner-up"). Vriend was active at a high level between 1972 and 1981, placing third in the Dutch All-round Championships in both 1977 and 1979. He also participated in the European All-round Championships five times and the World All-round Championships four times. He qualified for the 10,000 metres at the 1976 Winter Olympics; he was also entered for the 500 and 1,500 metres, but was unable to start due to illness. His coach and mentor, Egbert van 't Oever, observed that he performed well during training sessions and selection races, but he would freeze up at major tournaments. Consequently, from 1979 onwards, Van 't Oever decided not to include him in the core national team any longer. In 1985, Vriend completed the thirteenth Elfstedentocht, and in 1986, he took up marathon speed skating.

Until shortly before his death, Vriend remained active in cycling (with the West Friesland Cycling Club) and ice skating, particularly on natural ice.

== Personal bests ==
Distance	Time	Date	Track
500 m	39.70	18 January 1977	(Switzerland) Davos
1000 m	1:19.70	5 February 1976	(Switzerland) Davos
1500 m	1:59.04	21 March 1976	(Soviet Union) Medeu
3000 m	4:13.45	5 January 1979	(Germany) Inzell
5000 m	7:12.89	23 December 1979	(Austria) Innsbruck
10 000 m	14:59.26	21 March 1976	(Soviet Union) Medeu
