= Ulf Ekstrand =

Swedish speed skater

Ulf Arne Ekstrand (born 21 September 1957) is a former speed skater from Sweden, who represented his native country at the 1980 Winter Olympics in Lake Placid, New York.
