= Vasili Ippolitov =

Vasili Afanasievitsch Ippolitov (Russian: Василий Афанасьевич Ипполитов, born 1892, died 1957) was a Russian/Soviet speed skater from Moscow.

He was European Champion in 1913, Russian champion in 1911 and Soviet champion in 1923.

In 1913 and 1914 Ippolitov and Oscar Mathisen were the two main rivals in speed skating. Ippolitov had trained hard in Trondheim prior to the 1913 season, and his goal was to beat Mathisen. Mathisen won most of their races, but Ippolitov often beat him over 10,000 metres. At the European Championships in St.Petersburg in 1913, Ippolitov beat Mathisen and won the Championship.

Ippolitov was also a good cyclist, and was Soviet cycling champion in 1923. His brother, Platon was also an international speed skater.

== Personal records ==
- 500 m - 45.4
- 1500 m - 2:22.2
- 5000 m - 8:41.6
- 10 000 m - 17:35.5
