= Masahiko Yamamoto =

Japanese speed skater (born 1956)

Personal information
- Nationality: Japanese
- Born: 26 August 1956 (age 69) Hokkaido, Japan

Sport
- Sport: Speed skating

Masahiko Yamamoto (山本 雅彦, Yamamoto Masahiko; born 26 August 1956) is a Japanese speed skater. He competed at the 1976 Winter Olympics and the 1980 Winter Olympics.
