= Rolf Falk-Larssen =

Norwegian speed skater

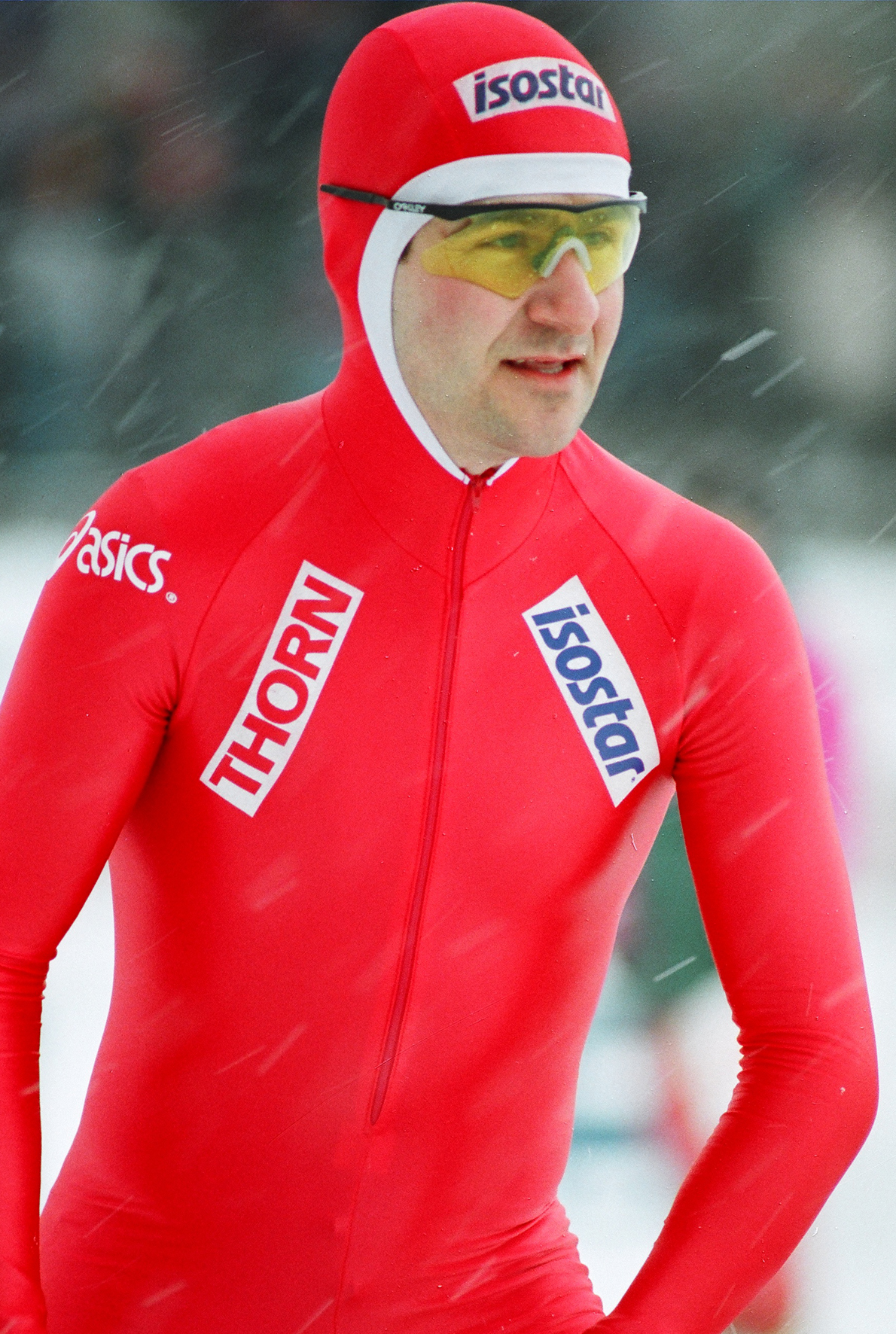
- Rolf Falk-Larssen

Personal information
- Born: 21 February 1960 (age 66) Trondheim, Norway
- Height: 1.73 m (5 ft 8 in)
- Weight: 67 kg (148 lb)

Sport
- Country: Norway
- Sport: Men's speed skating
- Club: Trondhjems Skøiteklub

Achievements and titles
- Personal best(s): 500 m: 37.88 (1988); 1000 m: 1:15.42 (1988); 1500 m: 1:54.26 (1987); 3000 m: 4:02.79 (1987); 5000 m: 6:50.93 (1987); 10 000 m: 14:30.34 (1982)
Medal record
Representing Norway
Men's speed skating
World Championships
Gold medal – first place	1983 Oslo	Allround
Bronze medal – third place	1982 Assen	Allround
World Cup
Bronze medal – third place	1987–88	1,500 m
European Championships
Silver medal – second place	1982 Oslo	Allround
Silver medal – second place	1984 Larvik	Allround

Rolf Falk-Larssen (born 21 February 1960) is a former speed skater.

Representing Trondhjems Skøiteklub, Rolf Falk-Larssen made his international debut at the European Allround Championships of 1982 and he was in the lead after three distances. On the final distance (the 10,000 m), he was paired against Tomas Gustafson, the number two after three distances. With just one lap left to go in that 10,000 m, it seemed that Falk-Larssen would be crowned as the new European Champion, but Gustafson skated an extraordinary last lap, setting a new world record of 14:23.59, and beating Falk-Larssen (who skated a great 14:30.34– a new Norwegian record) by 0.021 points (equivalent to just 0.42 seconds of difference on the 10,000 m). So Falk-Larssen won silver, and he would win a second European Allround silver medal in 1984. Three weeks later, at the 1982 World Allround Championships, Falk-Larssen won bronze.

In 1983, at the age of 22, Falk-Larssen won the World Allround Championships in Oslo. Winning three out of four distances, he managed to leave Tomas Gustafson behind before the final distance, the 10,000 m. Falk-Larssen finished the 10,000 m in thirteenth place, 37 seconds behind Gustafson, and if samalog scores had been used, he would have been number two. However, the rule at the time was that anyone who won three distances was World Champion (a remnant from pre–World War I days, when a skater had to win at least three distances to become World Champion). Segments of the crowd thought Falk-Larssen did not give his utmost during the final 10,000 m race, and he was booed during many of the laps. This was the only time in history that the World Champion had a worse samalog score than the number two, and it eventually resulted in the abolishment of the three-distance-wins rule in favour of ranking by samalog points exclusively (the Lex Gustafson, from 1987 onwards). For his accomplishments in 1983, Falk-Larssen received the Oscar Mathisen Award.

Being a typical allrounder, Falk-Larssen was not specialised enough to win an Olympic medal; he participated in the 1984 Winter Olympics in Sarajevo and the 1988 Winter Olympics in Calgary, but his best result in six races during those two Olympics was only a twelfth place. Falk-Larssen twice held world records in the allround small combination (500 m– 3,000 m– 1,500 m– 5,000 m), in 1982 and 1983. Falk-Larssen competed internationally until 1994. He won numerous medals at various Norwegian Championships.

He married speed skater Mona Iversen and has five children. Their daughters June Falk-Larssen and Mia Falk-Larssen are figure skaters at national level and their son Svein-Petter Falk-Larssen is an ice hockey player at national level.

== Medals ==
An overview of medals won by Falk-Larssen at important championships he participated in, listing the years in which he won each:

Championships	Gold medal	Silver medal	Bronze medal
Winter Olympics	–	–	–
World Allround	1983	–	1982
World Sprint	–	–	–
World Cup	–	–	1988 (1,500 m)
European Allround	–	1982; 1984	–
Norwegian Allround	1982; 1983; 1984; 1985; 1988	–	1986
Norwegian Sprint	–	1982; 1987	–
Norwegian Single Distance	1988 (1,000 m); 1988 (1,500 m); 1993 (1,500 m)	–	1988 (500 m); 1993 (5,000 m); 1994 (1,000 m)

== Records ==
=== World records ===
Over the course of his career, Falk-Larssen skated two world records:

Discipline	Time	Date	Location
Small combination	162.734	January 17, 1982	Davos
Small combination	161.758	January 23, 1983	Davos

Source: SpeedSkatingStats.com

=== Personal records ===
To put these personal records in perspective, the WR column lists the official world records on the dates that Falk-Larssen skated his personal records.

Event	Result	Date	Venue	WR
500 m	37.88	5 March 1988	Medeo	36.45
1,000 m	1:15.42	18 February 1988	Calgary	1:12.58
1,500 m	1:54.26	21 March 1987	Heerenveen	1:52.70
3,000 m	4:02.79	19 March 1987	Heerenveen	4:03.22
5,000 m	6:50.93	4 December 1987	Calgary	6:45.44
10,000 m	14:30.34	31 January 1982	Oslo	14:26.71
Big combination	162.062	15 February 1987	Heerenveen	160.807

Note that Falk-Larssen's personal record on the 3,000 m was not a world record because Leo Visser skated 3:59.27 at the same tournament.

Falk-Larssen has an Adelskalender score of 160.576 points. His highest ranking on the Adelskalender was a ninth place.

Awards
Preceded by (Sweden) Tomas Gustafson	Oscar Mathisen Award; 1983	Succeeded by (Canada) Gaétan Boucher
