= Masayuki Kawahara =

Japanese speed skater (born 1956)

Personal information
- Nationality: Japanese
- Born: 1 February 1956 (age 70) Hokkaido, Japan

Sport
- Sport: Speed skating

Masayuki Kawahara (川原 正行, Kawahara Masayuki; born 1 February 1956) is a Japanese speed skater. He competed at the 1976 Winter Olympics and the 1980 Winter Olympics.
