= Jan Junell =

Swedish speed skater

Personal information
- Nationality: Swedish
- Born: 14 October 1956 (age 68); Motala, Sweden

Sport
- Sport: Speed skating

Jan Junell (born 14 October 1956) is a Swedish speed skater. He competed at the 1980 Winter Olympics and the 1984 Winter Olympics.
