= Jaap Eden =

Dutch speed skater and track cyclist (1873–1925)

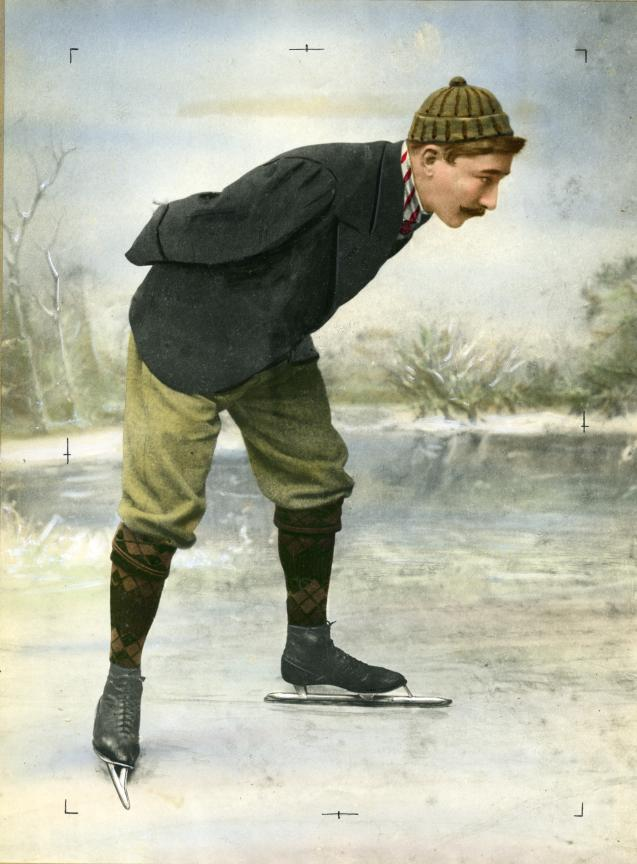
- Hand-colored photograph of Jaap Eden

Personal information
- Born: Jacobus Johannes Eden; 19 October 1873 Groningen, Netherlands
- Died: 2 February 1925 (aged 51) Haarlem, Netherlands
- Spouse: Louise Elisabeth Prinsen (m. 1914)

Sport
- Country: Netherlands
- Sport: Speed skating
- Retired: 1915
Medal record
Representing the Netherlands
Men's speed skating
World Allround Championships
| Gold medal – first place | 1893 Amsterdam | Allround |
| Gold medal – first place | 1895 Hamar | Allround |
| Gold medal – first place | 1896 Saint Petersburg | Allround |
Men's track cycling
World Championships
| Gold medal – first place | 1894 Antwerp | 10 km |
| Gold medal – first place | 1895 Cologne | Sprint |
| Silver medal – second place | 1894 Antwerp | Sprint |

Jacobus Johannes "Jaap" Eden (Note: The phrase Jacobus Johannes Eden is pronounced [jaːˈkoːbʏ ɕoːˈɦɑnəs ˈeːdə(n)], while Jaap Eden is pronounced [jaːp ˈeːdə(n)]. The first two names in isolation are pronounced [jaːˈkoːbʏs] and [joːˈɦɑnəs].) (19 October 1873 – 2 February 1925) was a Dutch athlete. He is the only male athlete to win world championships in both speed skating and bicycle racing.

== Early life ==
Jaap Eden was born in Groningen to Johannes Eden and Maria Baale. Eden's mother died of complications from his birth. His father, a gymnastics teacher, could not take care of the baby alone and sent him to his grandparents, who owned a hotel near Santpoort. As a boy, Eden enjoyed running in dunes near his grandparents' home, gymnastics and, in the winter, skating. His speed and skating technique were noticed by the best Dutch skater at the time, Klaas Pander, who invited the 15-year-old Eden to join him training.

Jaap Eden's first significant victory came in a short track race over 160m in December 1890. Thus, Eden, at age 17, was allowed by the Dutch Federation to compete in the world championships.

The championships were organized by the Skating Club of Amsterdam, as there was no international governing body at the time. Only two foreign skaters entered, American Joe Donoghue becoming the first champion. (Note: These world championships were later declared official by the ISU, and Donoghue is now considered to be first official speed skating world champion.) Eden skated in the shortest two of the four events, placing 3rd and 4th in the half mile and mile, respectively. Eden entered the European Championships in Hamburg, but without any notable success.

Bad weather canceled the 1892 world championships; the European Championships that year were only attended by Austrian skaters. Eden instead competed in the Prince of Orange Cup in England, where he won his first international competition.

In summer 1892, skating officials from several European countries convened in Scheveningen. The International Skating Union (ISU) was established, and the body's constitution announced annual world championships, over 500m, 1500m, 5000m and 10000m. The first ISU-governed world championships were to take place on the Museumplein in Amsterdam.

Eden also played bandy on an elite level, when it had been introduced to the Netherlands in 1891.

== Skating successes ==
Two days before the championships, Eden won the 1500m and 5000m Dutch championships. His time in the 1500 m, 2:35.0 is the first ISU-recognized world record in that distance. This made Eden, who trained in Norway earlier that winter, a favorite for the world championships.

In the 1500m, Eden tied with Oskar Frederiksen (Norway) in the preliminaries, but beat him in a head-to-head final race. He outclassed the field in the 5000m, winning by half a minute, while his main opponent Frederiksen did not finish. Eden was challenged again by Frederiksen in the first run of the 500m on the second day, but in the final Eden again beat the Norwegian. This meant Eden's third victory, sufficient for the world title. Frederiksen skated the first official world record in the 10000m. Eden, skating alone in the last race, fell after the first lap and abandoned the race.

After his victory, Eden was welcomed by a crowd in his home town Haarlem. He became known throughout the country.

The next winter, Eden trained in Hamar, Norway and traveled to Stockholm for the world championships in early February 1894. Because of bad weather, the championships were held in nearby Saltsjöbaden. The 500m, saw Eden paired with Frederiksen. The Norwegian made a false start, but was unaware of this until the finish. He was requested to re-skate immediately, but he wanted to recover. Eden, convinced Frederiksen would be disqualified, skated alone, finishing in 50.4 seconds. Frederiksen matched it in his second attempt. Jaap Eden did not want to skate a tie-breaker and Frederiksen won after drawing lots.

Eden skated a world record in 10,000m. With 19:12.4, he was half a minute ahead of the others. In the third distance, he lost to Einar Halvorsen, which meant no world champion. Eden failed to finish the final distance after a fall.

Two weeks later, the European championships took place in Hamar. Eden failed to compete on the first day, officially because of the strong wind. However, he was in his hotel with one of the chambermaids. Eden returned to the ice on the second day, and emphatically won the 5,000m in 8:37.6 — a world record by almost half a minute. The record remained for nearly 17 years, until it was broken by 0.4 seconds by Nikolay Strunnikov. (Note: Strunnikov's time was in an out-of-competition race, and was not officially recognized until 1967. In 1914, Oscar Mathisen was the first to break the record according to contemporary rules.)

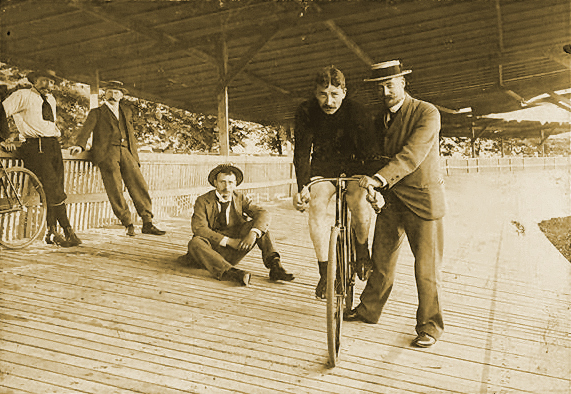
Jaap Eden won two world championships in cycling, one each in 1894 and 1895.

== Records ==
=== Personal records ===
Personal records
Men's speed skating
| Event | Result | Date | Location | Notes |
| 500m | 48.20 | 23 February 1895 | Hamar | |
| 1,500m | 2:25.4 | 23 February 1895 | Hamar | WR (1895–1898) |
| 5,000m | 8:37.6 | 25 February 1894 | Hamar | WR (1894–1911) |
| 10,000m | 17:56.0 | 23 February 1895 | Hamar | WR (1895–1900) |

Source: speedskatingbase.eu

=== World records ===
| Discipline | Time | Date | Location |
|---|---|---|---|
| 1,500 m | 2:35.0 | 11 January 1893 | Paterswolde |
| 10,000 m | 19:12.4 | 10 February 1894 | Neglingeviken |
| 5,000 m | 8:37.6 | 25 February 1894 | Hamar |
| 1,500 m | 2:25.4 | 23 February 1895 | Hamar |
| 10,000 m | 17:56.0 | 23 February 1895 | Hamar |

Source: SpeedSkatingStats.com

== Legacy ==
The ice skating rinks Jaap Edenbaan (outdoor) and Jaap Edenhal (indoor) in Amsterdam are named after Eden.

Since 1972, the Dutch Sportsman of the year receives the Jaap Eden Award. The prize for this achievement is a statue created by painter and sculptor Jits Bakker (1937–2014) from Bilthoven and is named after Eden.
