= Sergey Marchuk =

Soviet speed skater

Personal information
- Nationality: Russian
- Born: Sergey Vasilyevich Marchuk; 13 April 1953 Moscow, Russian SFSR, Soviet Union
- Died: 25 August 2016 (aged 63)
- Height: 1.74 m (5 ft 9 in)

Sport
- Country: Soviet Union
- Sport: Speed skating
- Club: Dynamo Moscow
- Turned pro: 1973
- Retired: 1980

Achievements and titles
- Personal bests: 500 m: 38.45 (1977); 1000 m: 1:14.65 (1977); 1500 m: 1:56.4 (1977); 3000 m: 3:56.65 (1977); 5000 m: 6:57.68 (1977= 10 000 m: 14:39.56 (1977)

Sergey Vasilyevich Marchuk (Russian: Серге́й Васильевич Марчук; 13 April 1952 – 25 August 2016) was a Russian speed skater.

== Biography ==
In 1977, Marchuk skated 3:56.65 on the 3,000 m on the Medeo rink of Alma-Ata, significantly below Ard Schenk's world record time of 4:08.3. Unfortunately for Marchuk, the tournament had not been approved by the International Skating Union (ISU) and so his time was not recognised as a world record. It would be 15 years before anyone, officially or unofficially, skated the 3,000 m faster than Marchuk had. This happened in 1992 when Thomas Bos skated an official world record of 3:56.16 at the indoor arena of Calgary – the Olympic Oval. Marchuk had his best year in 1978 when he became Soviet Allround Champion, European Allround Champion, and won bronze at the World Allround Championships.

== Medals ==
An overview of medals won by Marchuk at important championships he participated in, listing the years in which he won each. He participated at least once in all the championships that are listed.

Championships	Gold medal	Silver medal	Bronze medal
Winter Olympics	–	–	–
World Allround	–	–	1978
World Cup	–	–	–
European Allround	1978	–	1979
Soviet Allround	1977; 1978; 1979	1976; 1980	–

== Personal records ==
To put these personal records in perspective, the WR column lists the official world records on the dates that Marchuk skated his personal records.

Event	Result	Date	Venue	WR
500 m	38.45	26 March 1977	Medeo	37.00
1,000 m	1:14.65	12 March 1977	Medeo	1:15.70
1,500 m	1:56.4	25 December 1976	Medeo	1:55.61
3,000 m	3:56.65	11 March 1977	Medeo	4:08.3
5,000 m	6:57.68	29 December 1980	Medeo	6:56.9
10,000 m	14:39.56	3 April 1977	Medeo	14:38.08
Big combination	164.187	20 March 1977	Medeo	165.884

Note that Marchuk's personal record on the 1,000 m was not recognised as a world record by the ISU because he skated it at a non-approved meet. In addition, Eric Heiden skated even faster (1:14.47) at that same meet. Marchuk's personal record on the 3,000 m was set during that same non-approved meet, so it was not recognised as a world record either. Finally, Marchuk's personal record on the big combination was not a world record either because Jan Egil Storholt skated 163.221 at that same meet.

Marchuk has an Adelskalender score of 162.996 points. He was number one on the Adelskalender for 350 days in 1977 and 1978.
