= 1978 World Allround Speed Skating Championships =

International speed skating competition

1978 World Allround Speed Skating Championships for Men
- Venue: Ruddalens IP, Gothenburg, Sweden
- Dates: 25–26 February
- Competitors: 32 skaters from 15 nations

Medalist men
1st place, gold medalist(s)		Eric Heiden	USA
2nd place, silver medalist(s)		Jan Egil Storholt	NOR
3rd place, bronze medalist(s)		Sergey Marchuk	Soviet Union

The World Allround Speed Skating Championships for Men took place on 25 and 26 February 1978 in Gothenburg at the Ruddalens IP ice rink.

== Result ==
Rank	Skater	Country	Points Samalog	500m	5000m	1500m	10,000m
1st place, gold medalist(s)	Eric Heiden	United States	169.016	39.01 (gold)	7:20.80 (gold)	2:00.22 (gold)	15:17.06 (5)
2nd place, silver medalist(s)	Jan Egil Storholt	Norway	170.346	39.79 (2)	7:24.57 (4)	2:01.93 (2)	15:09.13 (2)
3rd place, bronze medalist(s)	Sergey Marchuk	Soviet Union	171.144	40.42 (5)	7:21.46 (2)	2:02.79 (4)	15:12.96 (3)
4	Kay Arne Stenshjemmet	Norway	171.458	39.88 (4)	7:26.10 (5)	2:02.63 (3)	15:21.85 (9)
5	Vladimir Lobanov	Soviet Union	172.911	39.81 (3)	7:32.05 (13)	2:03.14 (5)	15:37.00 (16)
6	Viktor Lyoskin	Soviet Union	172.967	41.17 (15)	7:26.29 (6)	2:04.43 (8)	15:13.84* (4)
7	Sten Stensen	Norway	173.239	40.95 (9)	7:29.68 (8)	2:05.98 (13)	15:06.57 (gold)
8	Amund Martin Sjøbrend	Norway	173.301	40.42 (5)	7:29.76 (9)	2:03.90 (6)	15:32.10 (14)
9	Hilbert van der Duim	Netherlands	173.342	40.64 (7)	7:27.43 (7)	2:06.22 (14)	15:17.73 (6)
10	Piet Kleine	Netherlands	173.802	41.61 (22)	7:24.07 (3)	2:05.49 (11)	15:19.11 (7)
11	Vitali Zazerski	Soviet Union	173.932	40.81 (8)	7:31.87 (11)	2:04.37 (7)	15:29.59 (11)
12	Mike Woods	United States	174.050	40.97 (10)	7:33.93 (15)	2:04.95 (9)	15:20.74 (8)
13	Jan Junell	Sweden	175.329	41.11 (12)	7:32.00 (12)	2:06.57 (15)	15:36.58 (15)
14	Andreas Ehrig	East Germany	175.843	41.50 (21)	7:31.18 (10)	2:07.95 (20)	15:31.51 (13)
15	Colin Coates	Austria	176.891	41.90 (24)	7:33.64 (14)	2:09.18 (25)	15:31.35 (12)
16	Klaas Vriend	Netherlands	199.340	1:04.43* (32)	7:34.88 (16)	2:09.02 (23)	15:28.33 (10)
NC17	Masahiko Yamamoto	Japan	129.499	41.13 (13)	7:43.89 (22)	2:05.94 (12)	–
NC18	Jürgen Warnicke	East Germany	129.522	41.09 (11)	7:40.69 (17)	2:07.09 (18)	–
NC19	Herbert Schwarz	West Germany	130.184	41.26 (16)	7:45.94 (23)	2:06.99 (16)	–
NC20	Tomas Gustafson	Sweden	130.361	41.13 (13)	7:42.21 (20)	2:09.03 (24)	–
NC21	Joop Pasman	Netherlands	130.386	41.43 (19)	7:46.00 (24)	2:07.07 (17)	–
NC22	Andrew Barron	Canada	130.812	41.87 (23)	7:41.16 (19)	2:08.48 (22)	–
NC23	Günter Schumacher	West Germany	131.008	42.98 (28)	7:43.62 (21)	2:05.00 (10)	–
NC24	Jouko Salakka	Finland	131.281	41.30 (18)	7:48.95 (25)	2:09.26 (26)	–
NC25	Masayuki Kawahara	Japan	131.303	41.29 (17)	7:54.93 (26)	2:07.56 (19)	–
NC26	Floriano Martello	Italy	132.452	42.09 (25)	7:56.06 (28)	2:08.27 (21)	–
NC27	Jarmo Alppi	Finland	132.725	42.74 (27)	7:40.79 (18)	2:11.72 (28)	–
NC28	Craig Webster	Canada	132.746	41.48 (20)	8:00.23 (29)	2:09.73 (27)	–
NC29	Olivier Belle	France	134.968	42.32 (26)	8:05.98 (30)	2:12.15 (29)	–
NC30	Geoff Sandys	United Kingdom	136.498	43.92 (30)	7:57.78 (28)	2:14.40 (31)	–
NC31	Guo Chengjiang	China	136.962	43.05 (29)	8:13.92 (31)	2:13.56 (30)	–
NC32	Antonio Gómez Fernández	Spain	175.485	1:02.48* (31)	9:50.92 (32)	2:41.74 (32)	–

* = Fell

== Attribution ==
In Dutch
