= 1981 World Allround Speed Skating Championships =

International speed skating competition

1981 World Allround Speed Skating Championships for Men
- Venue: Bislett Stadion, Oslo, Norway
- Dates: 14–15 February
- Competitors: 36 skaters from 16 nations

Medalist men
1st place, gold medalist(s)		Amund Martin Sjøbrend	NOR
2nd place, silver medalist(s)		Kay Arne Stenshjemmet	NOR
3rd place, bronze medalist(s)		Jan Egil Storholt	NOR

The World Allround Speed Skating Championships for Men took place on 14 and 15 February 1981 in Oslo at the Bislett Stadion ice rink.

Title holder was the Netherlander Hilbert van der Duim.

== Classification ==
Rank	Skater	Country	Points Samalog	500m	5000m	1500m	10,000m
1st place, gold medalist(s)	Amund Martin Sjøbrend	Norway	167.781	39.54 (11)	7:18.20 (4)	1:58.46 (gold)	14:58.71 (3)
2nd place, silver medalist(s)	Kay Arne Stenshjemmet	Norway	167.887	38.72 (gold)	7:17.51 (3)	1:58.64 (2)	15:17.40 (12)
3rd place, bronze medalist(s)	Jan Egil Storholt	Norway	168.374	38.92 (3)	7:23.13 (11)	1:58.68 (3)	15:11.62 (8)
4	Dmitry Bochkaryov	Soviet Union	168.770	39.82 (16)	7:17.39 (2)	2:00.27 (8)	15:02.42 (6)
5	Andreas Ehrig	East Germany	169.087	39.81 (15)	7:19.25 (5)	2:00.94 (11)	15:00.79 (4)
6	Tomas Gustafson	Sweden	169.106	39.47 (10)	7:23.10 (10)	1:59.14 (4)	15:12.27 (9)
7	Øyvind Tveter	Norway	169.511	40.21 (21)	7:19.34 (7)	2:00.98 (12)	15:00.82 (5)
8	Frits Schalij	Netherlands	169.677	39.23 (8)	7:26.75 (13)	2:00.05 (6)	15:15.13 (10)
9	Jan Junell	Sweden	170.036	40.12 (20)	7:19.79 (8)	2:00.50 (9)	15:15.43 (11)
10	Piet Kleine	Netherlands	170.080	40.72 (27)	7:16.17 (gold)	2:00.98 (12)	15:08.35 (7)
11	Sergey Berezin	Soviet Union	170.480	41.32 (30)	7:19.25 (5)	2:02.00 (16)	14:51.38 (gold)
12	Andreas Dietel	East Germany	170.527	38.73 (2)	7:27.54 (15)	1:59.61 (5)	15:43.46 (15)
13	Ulf Mademann	East Germany	171.322	39.61 (13)	7:27.43 (14)	2:01.19 (14)	15:31.47 (14)
14	Yasuhiro Shimizu	Japan	172.729	40.70 (26)	7:28.75 (16)	2:02.58 (19)	15:25.89 (13)
15	Ulf Ekstrand	Sweden	173.444	40.53 (24)	7:25.39 (12)	2:03.46 (21)	15:44.45 (16)
16	Hilbert van der Duim	Netherlands	173.934	39.09 (6)	7:21.17 (9)	2:17.76* (33)	14:56.14 (2)
NC17	Gaétan Boucher	Canada	124.676	38.95 (4)	7:35.43 (21)	2:00.55 (10)	–
NC18	Sergey Balashov	Soviet Union	124.795	39.63 (14)	7:30.99 (17)	2:00.20 (7)	–
NC19	Masahiko Yamamoto	Japan	125.557	39.26 (9)	7:35.64 (22)	2:02.20 (17)	–
NC20	Yevgeni Solunski	Soviet Union	126.211	40.51 (23)	7:31.45 (18)	2:01.67 (15)	–
NC21	Hans Magnusson	Sweden	126.541	39.82 (16)	7:39.45 (24)	2:02.33 (18)	–
NC22	Yep Kramer	Netherlands	126.668	40.28 (22)	7:33.15 (19)	2:03.22 (20)	–
NC23	Fritz Gawenus	West Germany	127.409	40.09 (18)	7:40.46 (26)	2:03.82 (22)	–
NC24	Jukka Ala-Louko	Finland	127.498	39.05 (5)	7:50.78 (31)	2:04.11 (23)	–
NC25	Pertti Niittylä	Finland	127.835	40.78 (28)	7:34.39 (20)	2:04.85 (25)	–
NC26	Nick Thometz	United States	127.855	39.57 (12)	7:47.59 (29)	2:04.58 (24)	–
NC27	Pat Moore	United States	128.011	39.15 (7)	7:46.05 (28)	2:06.77 (29)	–
NC28	Colin Coates	Australia	129.333	41.42 (31)	7:39.80 (25)	2:05.80 (26)	–
NC29	Kent Thometz	United States	129.546	40.09 (18)	7:54.16 (32)	2:06.12 (27)	–
NC30	Maurizio Marchetto	Italy	130.030	42.16 (33)	7:37.17 (23)	2:06.46 (28)	–
NC31	Mike Plant	United States	131.496	40.89 (29)	8:00.36 (33)	2:07.71 (30)	–
NC32	Marc Vernier	France	131.985	40.67 (25)	8:06.45 (34)	2:08.01 (31)	–
NC33	Alan Luke	United Kingdom	133.402	43.35 (34)	7:49.49 (30)	2:09.31 (32)	–
NC34	Garry Wilson	New Zealand	148.801	45.54 (35)	9:15.81* (35)	2:23.04 (34)	–
NC35	Antonio Gómez Fernández	Spain	160.365	50.89 (36)	9:29.85 (36)	2:37.47 (35)	–
NC	Werner Jäger	Austria	87.848	41.70 (32)	7:41.48 (27)	DNS	–

DQ = Disqualified
* = Fell

== Attribution ==
In Dutch
