= Speed skating at the 1980 Winter Olympics – Men's 5000 metres =

Speed skating at the Olympics

Men's 5000 metres at the XIII Olympic Winter Games
- Pictogram for speed skating
- Venue: James B. Sheffield Olympic Skating Rink
- Dates: February 16, 1980
- Competitors: 29 from 15 nations
- Winning time: 7:02.29 OR

Medalists
1st place, gold medalist(s)		Eric Heiden; United States
2nd place, silver medalist(s)		Kay Stenshjemmet; Norway
3rd place, bronze medalist(s)		Tom Erik Oxholm; Norway

The men's 5000 metres in speed skating at the 1980 Winter Olympics took place on 16 February, at the James B. Sheffield Olympic Skating Rink.

== Records ==
Prior to this competition, the existing world and Olympic records were as follows:

World record	Kay Arne Stenshjemmet (NOR)	6:56.9	Alma-Ata, Kazakh SSR, Soviet Union	19 March 1977
Olympic record	Fred Anton Maier (NOR)	7:22.4	Grenoble, France	15 February 1968

The following new Olympic records was set.

Date	Pair	Athlete	Country	Time	OR	WR
16 February	Pair 1	Tom Erik Oxholm	Norway	7:05.59	OR	
16 February	Pair 2	Eric Heiden	United States	7:02.29	OR	

== Results ==
Rank	Pair	Lane	Athlete	Country	Time	Time behind	Notes
1st place, gold medalist(s)	2	i	Eric Heiden	United States	7:02.29	–	OR
2nd place, silver medalist(s)	4	i	Kay Stenshjemmet	Norway	7:03.28	+0.99	
3rd place, bronze medalist(s)	1	i	Tom Erik Oxholm	Norway	7:05.59	+3.30	
4	2	o	Hilbert van der Duim	Netherlands	7:07.97	+5.68	
5	3	i	Øyvind Tveter	Norway	7:08.36	+6.07	
6	6	o	Piet Kleine	Netherlands	7:08.96	+6.67	
7	3	o	Mike Woods	United States	7:10.39	+8.10	
8	8	i	Ulf Ekstrand	Sweden	7:13.13	+10.84	
9	5	o	Yep Kramer	Netherlands	7:14.09	+11.80	
10	10	i	Andreas Ehrig	East Germany	7:14.56	+12.27	
11	4	o	Viktor Lyoskin	Soviet Union	7:16.24	+13.95	
12	1	o	Tomas Gustafson	Sweden	7:16.85	+14.56	
13	9	i	Dmitry Ogloblin	Soviet Union	7:16.92	+14.63	
14	10	o	Jan Junell	Sweden	7:19.50	+17.21	
15	8	o	Sergey Berezin	Soviet Union	7:19.93	+17.64	
16	14	i	Yasuhiro Shimizu	Japan	7:21.50	+19.21	
17	12	i	Pertti Niittylä	Finland	7:21.51	+19.22	
18	7	i	Craig Kressler	United States	7:25.43	+23.14	
19	7	o	Colin Coates	Australia	7:27.25	+24.96	
20	9	o	Craig Webster	Canada	7:28.94	+26.65	
21	5	i	Masahiko Yamamoto	Japan	7:33.02	+30.73	
22	11	o	Andrei Erdely	Romania	7:34.41	+32.12	
23	14	o	Maurizio Marchetto	Italy	7:35.50	+33.21	
24	11	i	Na Yun-Su	South Korea	7:39.62	+37.33	
25	6	i	Masayuki Kawahara	Japan	7:42.18	+39.89	
26	12	o	Alan Luke	Great Britain	7:52.65	+50.36	
27	15	i	John French	Great Britain	7:59.62	+57.33	
28	13	i	Geoff Sandys	Great Britain	8:01.09	+58.80	
29	13	o	Tömörbaataryn Nyamdavaa	Mongolia	8:07.68	+1:05.39	
