= Speed skating at the 1980 Winter Olympics – Men's 1500 metres =

Speed skating at the Olympics

Men's 1500 metres at the XIII Olympic Winter Games
- Pictogram for speed skating
- Venue: James B. Sheffield Olympic Skating Rink
- Dates: February 21, 1980
- Competitors: 36 from 16 nations
- Winning time: 1:55.44

Medalists
1st place, gold medalist(s)		Eric Heiden	United States
2nd place, silver medalist(s)		Kay Arne Stenshjemmet	Norway
3rd place, bronze medalist(s)		Terje Andersen	Norway

The men's 1500 metres in speed skating at the 1980 Winter Olympics took place on 21 February, at the James B. Sheffield Olympic Skating Rink.

== Records ==
Prior to this competition, the existing world and Olympic records were as follows:

World record	Eric Heiden (USA)	1:54.79	Davos, Switzerland	19 January 1980
Olympic record	Jan Egil Storholt (NOR)	1:59.38	Innsbruck, Austria	13 February 1976

The following new Olympic record was set.

Date	Pair	Athlete	Time	OR	WR
21 February	Pair 1	Jan Egil Storholt (NOR)	1:57.95	OR	
21 February	Pair 4	Eric Heiden (USA)	1:55.44	OR	

== Results ==
Rank	Pair	Lane	Athlete	Country	Time	Time behind	Notes
1st place, gold medalist(s)	4	o	Eric Heiden	United States	1:55.44	–	OR
2nd place, silver medalist(s)	4	i	Kay Arne Stenshjemmet	Norway	1:56.81	+1.37	
3rd place, bronze medalist(s)	5	o	Terje Andersen	Norway	1:56.92	+1.48	
4	8	o	Andreas Dietel	East Germany	1:57.14	+1.70	
5	6	i	Yury Kondakov	Soviet Union	1:57.36	+1.92	
6	1	i	Jan Egil Storholt	Norway	1:57.95	+2.51	
7	2	o	Tomas Gustafson	Sweden	1:58.18	+2.64	
8	3	o	Vladimir Lobanov	Soviet Union	1:59.30	+3.86	
9	10	o	Andreas Ehrig	East Germany	1:59.47	+4.03	
9	2	i	Yevhen Solunskiy	Soviet Union	1:59.47	+4.03	
11	9	i	Hilbert van der Duim	Netherlands	1:59.49	+4.05	
12	9	o	Herbert Schwarz	West Germany	1:59.58	+4.14	
13	11	i	Bert de Jong	Netherlands	1:59.83	+4.39	
14	7	o	Pertti Niittylä	Finland	2:00.01	+4.57	
15	18	i	Gaétan Boucher	Canada	2:00.15	+4.71	
16	11	o	Ulf Ekstrand	Sweden	2:00.23	+4.79	
17	5	i	Tom Plant	United States	2:00.57	+5.13	
18	6	o	Craig Kressler	United States	2:00.60	+5.16	
19	1	o	Masahiko Yamamoto	Japan	2:01.25	+5.81	
20	3	i	Masayuki Kawahara	Japan	2:01.28	+5.84	
21	10	i	Jan Junell	Sweden	2:02.11	+6.67	
22	7	i	Lee Yeong-Ha	South Korea	2:02.37	+6.93	
23	14	i	Craig Webster	Canada	2:02.41	+6.97	
24	12	i	Yasuhiro Shimizu	Japan	2:04.54	+9.10	
25	15	i	Zhao Weichang	China	2:05.48	+10.04	
26	16	i	Na Yun-su	South Korea	2:06.65	+11.21	
27	17	o	Jacques Thibault	Canada	2:06.79	+11.35	
28	17	i	Maurizio Marchetto	Italy	2:07.45	+12.01	
29	14	o	Guo Chengjiang	China	2:08.33	+12.89	
30	12	o	Li Huchun	China	2:10.00	+14.56	
31	15	o	Tömörbaataryn Nyamdavaa	Mongolia	2:11.51	+16.07	
32	13	o	Mike Richmond	Australia	2:13.40	+17.96	
33	16	o	Geoff Sandys	Great Britain	2:15.06	+19.62	
34	13	i	Alan Luke	Great Britain	2:17.79	+22.35	
35	18	i	Dorjiin Tsenddoo	Mongolia	2:19.30	+23.86	
-	8	i	Yep Kramer	Netherlands	DNF		
