= European Speed Skating Championships for Men =

International speed skating competition

The International Skating Union has organised the European Speed Skating Championships for Men since 1893. Unofficial championships were held in the years 1891–1892.

== History ==
=== Program ===
- In the years 1891–1892, three distances had to be skated: 1/3 mile (536 m) – 1 mile (1,609 m) – 3 miles (4.8 km) (4,828 m).
- In the years 1893–1895, three distances had to be skated: 500 m – 1500 m – 5000 m.
- In the years 1896–1935, four distances had to be skated: 500 m – 1500 m – 5000 m – 10000 m (the big combination).
- In the years 1936–1939 and 1947, four distances had to be skated: 500 m – 1500 m – 3000 m – 5000 m (the small combination).
- In the years 1946, 1948–2017 and subsequent odd years, four distances are skated: 500 m – 1500 m – 5000 m – 10000 m (the big combination).
- Starting in 2017, in odd years, a separate competition with four distances is held: 500 m – 1000 m – 500 m – 1000 m (the sprint combination).
- Starting in 2018, in even years, a single distance championships with seven events will be held: 500 m, 1000 m, 1500 m, 5000 m, team pursuit, mass start, and team sprint.

Note that at the 1967 European Championships in Lahti, Finland, it was so cold that the officials decided that they did not want to expose the skaters to the extreme cold for a long time and so they replaced the 10000 m event with a 3000 m event, in effect using the small combination distances instead of the big combination ones.

=== Ranking systems used ===
- In the years 1891–1895, one could only win the European Championships by winning the majority of the distances, so there would be no European Champion if no skater won at least two of three distances. Silver and bronze medals were never awarded.
- In the years 1896–1907, one could only win the European Championships by winning the majority of the distances, so there would be no European Champion if no skater won at least two of four distances. If there would be two skaters who won two distances each, the title would be awarded to one of them who had the better total time at four distances. Silver and bronze medals were never awarded.
- In the years 1908–1925, ranking points were awarded (1 point for 1st place, 2 points for 2nd place, and so on); the final ranking was then decided by ordering the skaters by lowest point totals. The rule that a skater winning at least three distances was automatically European Champion was in effect, though, so the ranking could be affected by that. Silver and bronze medals were awarded now as well.
- In the years 1926–1927, the ranking points on each distance were percentage points, calculated from a skater's time and the current European record time. Apart from that, the system used was the same as in the immediately preceding years.
- Since 1928, the samalog system has been in use. However, the rule that a skater winning at least three distances was automatically European Champion remained in effect until (and including) 1986.

== Medal winners ==
Numbers in brackets denotes number of victories in corresponding disciplines. Boldface denotes record number of victories.

=== Unofficial Allround championships ===
Year	Location	Gold	Silver	Bronze
1891	Hamburg	None declared	None declared	None declared
1892	Vienna	(Austria) Franz Schilling	None declared	None declared
1946	Trondheim	(Sweden) Göthe Hedlund	(Norway) Aage Johansen	(Soviet Union) Nikolay Petrov

=== Official Allround championships ===
Note that from 1936 to 1948, non-European skaters were allowed to participate if they were members of European skating clubs.

Year	Location	Gold	Silver	Bronze
1893	Berlin	(Sweden) Rudolf Ericson	None declared	None declared
1894	Hamar	None declared	None declared	None declared
1895	Budapest	(Norway) Alfred Næss	None declared	None declared
1896	Hamburg	(Germany) Julius Seyler	None declared	None declared
1897	Amsterdam	(Germany) Julius Seyler (2)	None declared	None declared
1898	Helsingfors (Helsinki)	(Russia) Gustaf Estlander (Note: Estlander represented the Grand Duchy of Finland which was part of the Russian Empire at that time.)	None declared	None declared
1899	Davos	(Norway) Peder Østlund	None declared	None declared
1900	Štrbské Pleso	(Norway) Peder Østlund (2)	None declared	None declared
1901	Trondhjem (Trondheim)	(Norway) Rudolf Gundersen	None declared	None declared
1902	Davos	(Norway) Johan Schwartz	None declared	None declared
1903	Kristiania (Oslo)	None declared	None declared	None declared
1904	Davos	(Norway) Rudolf Gundersen	None declared	None declared
1905	Stockholm	(Russia) Johan Vikander (Note: Vikander represented the Grand Duchy of Finland which was part of the Russian Empire at that time.)	None declared	None declared
1906	Davos	(Norway) Rudolf Gundersen (3)	None declared	None declared
1907	Davos	(Sweden) Moje Öholm	None declared	None declared
1908	Klagenfurt	(Sweden) Moje Öholm (2)	(Norway) Oscar Mathisen	(Austria) Thomas Bohrer
1909	Budapest	(Norway) Oscar Mathisen	(Austria) Thomas Bohrer	(Sweden) Moje Öholm
1910	Viipuri	(Russia) Nikolay Strunnikov	(Norway) Magnus Johansen	(Norway) Oscar Mathisen
1911	Hamar	(Russia) Nikolay Strunnikov (2)	(Austria) Thomas Bohrer	(Sweden) Otto Andersson
1912	Stockholm	(Norway) Oscar Mathisen	(Russia) Gunnar Strömstén (Note: Strömstén represented the Grand Duchy of Finland which was part of the Russian Empire at that time.)	(Norway) Martin Sæterhaug
1913	St. Petersburg	(Russia) Vasily Ippolitov	(Norway) Oscar Mathisen	(Russia) Nikita Naidenov
1914	Berlin	(Norway) Oscar Mathisen (3)	(Russia) Vasily Ippolitov	(Norway) Bjarne Frang
1915	Not held due to World War I			
1916	Not held due to World War I			
1917	Not held due to World War I			
1918	Not held due to World War I			
1919	Not held due to World War I			
1920	Not held due to World War I			
1921	Not held due to World War I			
1922	Helsingfors (Helsinki)	(Finland) Clas Thunberg	(Norway) Ole Olsen	(Finland) Asser Wallenius
1923	Hamar	(Norway) Harald Strøm	(Finland) Clas Thunberg	(Norway) Roald Larsen
1924	Kristiania (Oslo)	(Norway) Roald Larsen	(Finland) Clas Thunberg	(Norway) Oskar Olsen
1925	St. Moritz	(Austria) Otto Polacsek	(Norway) Roald Larsen	(Norway) Oskar Olsen
1926	Chamonix	(Finland) Julius Skutnabb	(Austria) Otto Polacsek	(Finland) Uuno Pietilä
1927	Stockholm	(Norway) Bernt Evensen	(Finland) Clas Thunberg	(Norway) Ivar Ballangrud
1928	Oslo	(Finland) Clas Thunberg	(Norway) Bernt Evensen	(Norway) Roald Larsen
1929	Davos	(Norway) Ivar Ballangrud	(Finland) Clas Thunberg	(Norway) Roald Larsen
1930	Nidaros (Trondheim)	(Norway) Ivar Ballangrud	(Norway) Michael Staksrud	(Norway) Thorstein Stenbek
1931	Stockholm	(Finland) Clas Thunberg	(Finland) Ossi Blomqvist	(Netherlands) Dolf van der Scheer
1932	Davos	(Finland) Clas Thunberg (4)	(Finland) Ossi Blomqvist	(Austria) Rudolf Riedl
1933	Viipuri	(Norway) Ivar Ballangrud	(Finland) Birger Wasenius	(Finland) Kalle Paananen
1934	Hamar	(Norway) Michael Staksrud	(Austria) Max Stiepl	(Austria) Karl Wazulek
1935	Helsinki	(Austria) Karl Wazulek	(Norway) Bernt Evensen	(Finland) Birger Wasenius
1936	Oslo	(Norway) Ivar Ballangrud (4)	(Norway) Charles Mathiesen	(Norway) Harry Haraldsen
1937	Davos	(Norway) Michael Staksrud (2)	(Norway) Hans Engnestangen	(Finland) Birger Wasenius
1938	Oslo	(Norway) Charles Mathiesen	(Norway) Harry Haraldsen	(Norway) Ivar Ballangrud
1939	Riga	(Latvia) Alfons Bērziņš	(Norway) Charles Mathiesen	(Norway) Aage Johansen
1940	Not held due to World War II			
1941	Not held due to World War II			
1942	Not held due to World War II			
1943	Not held due to World War II			
1944	Not held due to World War II			
1945	Not held due to World War II			
1946	Not held due to World War II			
1947	Stockholm	(Sweden) Åke Seyffarth	(Sweden) Göthe Hedlund	(Norway) Sverre Farstad
1948	Hamar	(Norway) Reidar Liaklev	(Sweden) Göthe Hedlund	(Norway) Odd Lundberg
1949	Davos	(Norway) Sverre Farstad	(Norway) Hjalmar Andersen	(Hungary) Kornél Pajor
1950	Helsinki	(Norway) Hjalmar Andersen	(Norway) Reidar Liaklev	(Norway) Sverre Haugli
1951	Oslo	(Norway) Hjalmar Andersen	(Netherlands) Wim van der Voort	(Norway) Henry Wahl
1952	Östersund	(Norway) Hjalmar Andersen (3)	(Netherlands) Kees Broekman	(Sweden) Kornél Pajor (Note: Pajor used to skate for Hungary until he defected in 1949. From then on the ISU allowed him to participate as an independent skater representing the ISU. In 1952 he skated for the Castor Sport Federation of Östersund in Sweden also representing Sweden.)
1953	Hamar	(Netherlands) Kees Broekman	(Netherlands) Wim van der Voort	(Norway) Ivar Martinsen
1954	Davos	(Soviet Union) Boris Shilkov	(Norway) Hjalmar Andersen	(Sweden) Sigvard Ericsson
1955	Falun	(Sweden) Sigvard Ericsson	(Soviet Union) Oleg Goncharenko	(Soviet Union) Dmitry Sakunenko
1956	Helsinki	(Soviet Union) Yevgeny Grishin	(Norway) Knut Johannesen	(Sweden) Sigvard Ericsson
1957	Oslo	(Soviet Union) Oleg Goncharenko	(Norway) Knut Johannesen	(Norway) Roald Aas
1958	Eskilstuna	(Soviet Union) Oleg Goncharenko (2)	(Soviet Union) Vladimir Shilykovsky	(Norway) Knut Johannesen
1959	Gothenburg	(Norway) Knut Johannesen	(Finland) Juhani Järvinen	(Finland) Toivo Salonen
1960	Oslo	(Norway) Knut Johannesen (2)	(Soviet Union) Boris Stenin	(Norway) Roald Aas
1961	Helsinki	(Soviet Union) Viktor Kosichkin	(Netherlands) Henk van der Grift	(France) André Kouprianoff
1962	Oslo	(Soviet Union) Robert Merkulov	(France) André Kouprianoff	(Soviet Union) Boris Stenin
1963	Gothenburg	(Norway) Nils Aaness	(Norway) Knut Johannesen	(Norway) Per Ivar Moe
1964	Oslo	(Soviet Union) Ants Antson	(Soviet Union) Yuri Yumashev	(Norway) Per Ivar Moe
1965	Gothenburg	(Soviet Union) Eduard Matusevich	(Norway) Per Ivar Moe	(Soviet Union) Viktor Kosichkin
1966	Deventer	(Netherlands) Ard Schenk	(Netherlands) Kees Verkerk	(Soviet Union) Valeri Kaplan
1967	Lahti	(Netherlands) Kees Verkerk	(Soviet Union) Valeri Kaplan	(Soviet Union) Eduard Matusevich
1968	Oslo	(Norway) Fred Anton Maier	(Soviet Union) Eduard Matusevich	(Norway) Magne Thomassen
1969	Inzell	(Norway) Dag Fornæss	(Netherlands) Kees Verkerk	(Sweden) Göran Claeson
1970	Innsbruck	(Netherlands) Ard Schenk	(Norway) Dag Fornæss	(Sweden) Göran Claeson
1971	Heerenveen	(Norway) Dag Fornæss (2)	(Netherlands) Ard Schenk	(Netherlands) Kees Verkerk
1972	Davos	(Netherlands) Ard Schenk (3)	(Norway) Roar Grønvold	(Netherlands) Jan Bols
1973	Grenoble	(Sweden) Göran Claeson	(Netherlands) Hans van Helden	(Netherlands) Harm Kuipers
1974	Eskilstuna	(Sweden) Göran Claeson (2)	(Norway) Amund Sjøbrend	(Netherlands) Hans van Helden
1975	Heerenveen	(Norway) Sten Stensen	(Netherlands) Harm Kuipers	(Netherlands) Piet Kleine
1976	Oslo	(Norway) Kay Arne Stenshjemmet	(Norway) Sten Stensen	(Norway) Jan Egil Storholt
1977	Larvik	(Norway) Jan Egil Storholt	(Norway) Kay Arne Stenshjemmet	(Norway) Amund Sjøbrend
1978	Oslo	(Soviet Union) Sergey Marchuk	(Norway) Sten Stensen	(Norway) Jan Egil Storholt
1979	Deventer	(Norway) Jan Egil Storholt (2)	(Norway) Kay Arne Stenshjemmet	(Soviet Union) Sergey Marchuk
1980	Trondheim	(Norway) Kay Arne Stenshjemmet (2)	(Norway) Jan Egil Storholt	(Norway) Tom Erik Oxholm
1981	Deventer	(Norway) Amund Sjøbrend	(Netherlands) Hilbert van der Duim	(Norway) Kay Arne Stenshjemmet
1982	Oslo	(Sweden) Tomas Gustafson	(Norway) Rolf Falk-Larssen	(Netherlands) Hilbert van der Duim
1983	The Hague	(Netherlands) Hilbert van der Duim	(Netherlands) Yep Kramer	(Norway) Bjørn Nyland
1984	Larvik	(Netherlands) Hilbert van der Duim (2)	(Norway) Rolf Falk-Larssen	(Netherlands) Frits Schalij
1985	Eskilstuna	(Netherlands) Hein Vergeer	(Netherlands) Frits Schalij	(Soviet Union) Oleg Bozhev
1986	Oslo	(Netherlands) Hein Vergeer (2)	(Soviet Union) Aleksandr Mozin	(Sweden) Tomas Gustafson
1987	Trondheim	(Soviet Union) Nikolay Gulyayev	(Austria) Michael Hadschieff	(Netherlands) Hein Vergeer
1988	The Hague	(Sweden) Tomas Gustafson (2)	(Netherlands) Leo Visser	(Netherlands) Gerard Kemkers
1989	Gothenburg	(Netherlands) Leo Visser	(Netherlands) Gerard Kemkers	(Norway) Geir Karlstad
1990	Heerenveen	(Netherlands) Bart Veldkamp	(Sweden) Tomas Gustafson	(Netherlands) Leo Visser
1991	Sarajevo	(Norway) Johann Olav Koss	(Netherlands) Leo Visser	(Netherlands) Bart Veldkamp
1992	Heerenveen	(Netherlands) Falko Zandstra	(Norway) Johann Olav Koss	(Netherlands) Rintje Ritsma
1993	Heerenveen	(Netherlands) Falko Zandstra (2)	(Norway) Johann Olav Koss	(Netherlands) Rintje Ritsma
1994	Hamar	(Netherlands) Rintje Ritsma	(Norway) Johann Olav Koss	(Netherlands) Falko Zandstra
1995	Heerenveen	(Netherlands) Rintje Ritsma	(Netherlands) Falko Zandstra	(Italy) Roberto Sighel
1996	Heerenveen	(Netherlands) Rintje Ritsma	(Netherlands) Ids Postma	(Netherlands) Martin Hersman
1997	Heerenveen	(Netherlands) Ids Postma	(Netherlands) Rintje Ritsma	(Netherlands) Falko Zandstra
1998	Helsinki	(Netherlands) Rintje Ritsma	(Italy) Roberto Sighel	(Russia) Vadim Sayutin
1999	Heerenveen	(Netherlands) Rintje Ritsma	(Italy) Roberto Sighel	(Russia) Dmitry Shepel
2000	Hamar	(Netherlands) Rintje Ritsma (6)	(Norway) Eskil Ervik	(Netherlands) Ids Postma
2001	Baselga di Pinè	(Russia) Dmitry Shepel	(Belgium) Bart Veldkamp (Note: Until 1995 Veldkamp skated for the Netherlands. From 1996 he skated for Belgium in order to avoid having to participate in Dutch qualification trials for the major tournaments.)	(Netherlands) Ids Postma
2002	Erfurt	(Netherlands) Jochem Uytdehaage	(Netherlands) Carl Verheijen	(Russia) Dmitry Shepel
2003	Heerenveen	(Netherlands) Gianni Romme	(Netherlands) Rintje Ritsma	(Netherlands) Mark Tuitert
2004	Heerenveen	(Netherlands) Mark Tuitert	(Netherlands) Carl Verheijen	(Netherlands) Jochem Uytdehaage
2005	Heerenveen	(Netherlands) Jochem Uytdehaage (2)	(Netherlands) Sven Kramer	(Netherlands) Carl Verheijen
2006	Hamar	(Italy) Enrico Fabris	(Norway) Eskil Ervik	(Norway) Håvard Bøkko
2007	Collalbo	(Netherlands) Sven Kramer	(Italy) Enrico Fabris	(Netherlands) Carl Verheijen
2008	Kolomna	(Netherlands) Sven Kramer	(Norway) Håvard Bøkko	(Italy) Enrico Fabris
2009	Heerenveen	(Netherlands) Sven Kramer	(Norway) Håvard Bøkko	(Netherlands) Wouter olde Heuvel
2010	Hamar	(Netherlands) Sven Kramer	(Italy) Enrico Fabris	(Russia) Ivan Skobrev
2011	Collalbo	(Russia) Ivan Skobrev	(Netherlands) Jan Blokhuijsen	(Netherlands) Koen Verweij
2012	Budapest	(Netherlands) Sven Kramer	(Netherlands) Jan Blokhuijsen	(Norway) Håvard Bøkko
2013	Heerenveen	(Netherlands) Sven Kramer	(Netherlands) Jan Blokhuijsen	(Norway) Håvard Bøkko
2014	Hamar	(Netherlands) Jan Blokhuijsen	(Netherlands) Koen Verweij	(Norway) Håvard Bøkko
2015	Chelyabinsk	(Netherlands) Sven Kramer	(Netherlands) Koen Verweij	(Russia) Denis Yuskov
2016	Minsk	(Netherlands) Sven Kramer	(Belgium) Bart Swings	(Netherlands) Jan Blokhuijsen
2017	Heerenveen	(Netherlands) Sven Kramer	(Netherlands) Jan Blokhuijsen	(Belgium) Bart Swings
2019	Collalbo	(Netherlands) Sven Kramer **(10)**	(Netherlands) Patrick Roest	(Norway) Sverre Lunde Pedersen
2021	Heerenveen	(Netherlands) Patrick Roest	(Netherlands) Marcel Bosker	(Norway) Sverre Lunde Pedersen
2023	Hamar	(Netherlands) Patrick Roest (2)	(Norway) Sander Eitrem	(Belgium) Bart Swings
2025	Heerenveen	(Norway) Sander Eitrem	(Norway) Peder Kongshaug	(Netherlands) Beau Snellink

=== Sprint championships ===
Year	Location	Gold	Silver	Bronze
2017	Heerenveen	(Netherlands) Kai Verbij	(Netherlands) Kjeld Nuis	(Germany) Nico Ihle
2019	Collalbo	(Netherlands) Kai Verbij **(2)**	(Norway) Håvard Holmefjord Lorentzen	(Norway) Henrik Fagerli Rukke
2021	Heerenveen	(Netherlands) Thomas Krol	(Netherlands) Hein Otterspeer	(Germany) Joel Dufter
2023	Hamar	(Netherlands) Merijn Scheperkamp	(Netherlands) Hein Otterspeer	(Estonia) Marten Liiv
2025	Heerenveen	(Netherlands) Jenning de Boo	(Netherlands) Merijn Scheperkamp	(Netherlands) Tim Prins

=== 500 metres ===
Year	Location	Gold	Silver	Bronze
2018	Kolomna	(Netherlands) Ronald Mulder	(Finland) Mika Poutala	(Russia) Pavel Kulizhnikov
2020	Heerenveen	(Russia) Pavel Kulizhnikov	(Netherlands) Dai Dai N'tab	(Russia) Ruslan Murashov
2022	Heerenveen	(Poland) Piotr Michalski	(Netherlands) Merijn Scheperkamp	(Netherlands) Dai Dai N'tab
2024	Heerenveen	(Netherlands) Jenning de Boo	(Estonia) Marten Liiv	(Poland) Marek Kania
2026	Tomaszów Mazowiecki	(Poland) Damian Żurek	(Poland) Marek Kania	(Norway) Bjørn Magnussen

=== 1000 metres ===
Year	Location	Gold	Silver	Bronze
2018	Kolomna	(Russia) Pavel Kulizhnikov	(Russia) Denis Yuskov	(Germany) Nico Ihle
2020	Heerenveen	(Russia) Pavel Kulizhnikov **(2)**	(Netherlands) Thomas Krol	(Netherlands) Kai Verbij
2022	Heerenveen	(Netherlands) Thomas Krol	(Netherlands) Kjeld Nuis	(Netherlands) Kai Verbij
2024	Heerenveen	(Netherlands) Kjeld Nuis	(Netherlands) Jenning de Boo	(Netherlands) Tim Prins
2026	Tomaszów Mazowiecki	(Poland) Damian Żurek	(Netherlands) Tim Prins	(Estonia) Marten Liiv

=== 1500 metres ===
Year	Location	Gold	Silver	Bronze
2018	Kolomna	(Russia) Denis Yuskov	(Netherlands) Thomas Krol	(Netherlands) Koen Verweij
2020	Heerenveen	(Netherlands) Thomas Krol	(Russia) Denis Yuskov	(Netherlands) Patrick Roest
2022	Heerenveen	(Netherlands) Kjeld Nuis	(Netherlands) Thomas Krol	(Norway) Allan Dahl Johansson
2024	Heerenveen	(Norway) Peder Kongshaug	(Netherlands) Kjeld Nuis	(Netherlands) Patrick Roest
2026	Tomaszów Mazowiecki	(Norway) Peder Kongshaug **(2)**	(Poland) Vladimir Semirunniy	(Netherlands) Tim Prins

=== 5000 metres ===
Year	Location	Gold	Silver	Bronze
2018	Kolomna	(Italy) Nicola Tumolero	(Russia) Aleksandr Rumyantsev	(Netherlands) Marcel Bosker
2020	Heerenveen	(Netherlands) Patrick Roest	(Netherlands) Sven Kramer	(Russia) Denis Yuskov
2022	Heerenveen	(Netherlands) Patrick Roest	(Netherlands) Jorrit Bergsma	(Norway) Hallgeir Engebråten
2024	Heerenveen	(Netherlands) Patrick Roest **(3)**	(Italy) Davide Ghiotto	(Norway) Sander Eitrem
2026	Tomaszów Mazowiecki	(Poland) Vladimir Semirunniy	(Italy) Riccardo Lorello	(Italy) Davide Ghiotto

=== Mass start ===
Year	Location	Gold	Silver	Bronze
2018	Kolomna	(Netherlands) Jan Blokhuijsen	(Italy) Andrea Giovannini	(Russia) Ruslan Zakharov
2020	Heerenveen	(Belgium) Bart Swings	(Netherlands) Arjan Stroetinga	(Russia) Danila Semerikov
2022	Heerenveen	(Belgium) Bart Swings	(Switzerland) Livio Wenger	(Russia) Ruslan Zakharov
2024	Heerenveen	(Belgium) Bart Swings	(Austria) Gabriel Odor	(Norway) Allan Dahl Johansson
2026	Tomaszów Mazowiecki	(Belgium) Bart Swings **(4)**	(Netherlands) Bart Hoolwerf	(Italy) Andrea Giovannini

=== Team pursuit ===
Year	Location	Gold	Silver	Bronze
2018	Kolomna	Netherlands; Jan Blokhuijsen; Marcel Bosker; Simon Schouten	Russia; Sergey Gryaztsov; Aleksandr Rumyantsev; Danila Semerikov	Poland; Zbigniew Bródka; Jan Szymański; Adrian Wielgat
2020	Heerenveen	Netherlands; Marcel Bosker; Sven Kramer; Patrick Roest	Russia; Aleksandr Rumyantsev; Danila Semerikov; Denis Yuskov	Norway; Håvard Bøkko; Hallgeir Engebråten; Sverre Lunde Pedersen
2022	Heerenveen	Netherlands; Marcel Bosker **(3)**; Sven Kramer (2); Patrick Roest (2)	Norway; Hallgeir Engebråten; Allan Dahl Johansson; Sverre Lunde Pedersen	Italy; Davide Ghiotto; Andrea Giovannini; Michele Malfatti
2024	Heerenveen	Norway; Sander Eitrem; Peder Kongshaug; Sverre Lunde Pedersen	Italy; Davide Ghiotto; Andrea Giovannini; Michele Malfatti	Netherlands; Marcel Bosker; Bart Hoolwerf; Chris Huizinga
2026	Tomaszów Mazowiecki	Italy; Davide Ghiotto; Andrea Giovannini; Michele Malfatti	Netherlands; Louis Hollaar; Kars Jansman; Wisse Slendebroek	Norway; Sigurd Henriksen; Peder Kongshaug; Didrik Eng Strand

=== Team sprint ===
Year	Location	Gold	Silver	Bronze
2018	Kolomna	Russia; Ruslan Murashov; Pavel Kulizhnikov; Denis Yuskov	Finland; Harri Levo; Pekka Koskela; Mika Poutala	Poland; Artur Nogal; Piotr Michalski; Sebastian Kłosiński
2020	Heerenveen	Russia; Ruslan Murashov **(2)**; Viktor Mushtakov; Pavel Kulizhnikov **(2)**	Norway; Bjørn Magnussen; Håvard Holmefjord Lorentzen; Odin By Farstad	Switzerland; Oliver Grob; Christian Oberbichler; Livio Wenger
2022	Heerenveen	Netherlands; Merijn Scheperkamp; Kai Verbij; Tijmen Snel	Norway; Bjørn Magnussen; Henrik Fagerli Rukke; Håvard Holmefjord Lorentzen	Poland; Marek Kania; Damian Żurek; Piotr Michalski
2024	Heerenveen	Poland; Marek Kania; Piotr Michalski; Damian Żurek	Norway; Pål Myhren Kristensen; Bjørn Magnussen; Håvard Holmefjord Lorentzen	Netherlands; Stefan Westenbroek; Jenning de Boo; Wesly Dijs
2026	Tomaszów Mazowiecki	Poland; Piotr Michalski **(2)**; Marek Kania **(2)**; Szymon Wojtakowski	Netherlands; Stefan Westenbroek; Kayo Vos; Merijn Scheperkamp	Norway; Siver Brattgjerd; Henrik Fagerli Rukke; Bjørn Magnussen

== All-time medal count ==
=== Allround and Sprint Championships (1891–2025) ===
Rank	Nation	Gold	Silver	Bronze	Total
1	Netherlands	42	34	28	104
2	Norway	39	40	38	117
3	Soviet Union	10	7	8	25
4	Sweden	10	3	8	21
5	Finland	7	9	6	22
6	Russia	5	1	6	12
7	Austria	3	5	3	11
8	Germany	2	0	2	4
9	Italy	1	4	2	7
10	Latvia	1	0	0	1
11	Belgium	0	2	2	4
12	France	0	1	1	2
13	Estonia	0	0	1	1
13	Hungary	0	0	1	1
Totals (14 entries)		120	106	106	332

Unofficial European Championships of 1891, 1892 and 1946 (not recognized by the ISU) included

=== Single Distance Championships (2018–2026) ===
Rank	Nation	Gold	Silver	Bronze	Total
1	Netherlands	14	15	11	40
2	Russia	6	5	6	17
3	Poland	6	2	4	12
4	Belgium	4	0	0	4
5	Norway	3	4	8	15
6	Italy	2	4	3	9
7	Finland	0	2	0	2
8	Estonia	0	1	1	2
8	Switzerland	0	1	1	2
10	Austria	0	1	0	1
11	Germany	0	0	1	1
Totals (11 entries)		35	35	35	105

=== Combined all-time medal count (1891–2026) ===
Rank	Nation	Gold	Silver	Bronze	Total
1	Netherlands	56	49	39	144
2	Norway	42	44	46	132
3	Russia	11	6	12	29
4	Soviet Union	10	7	8	25
5	Sweden	10	3	8	21
6	Finland	7	11	6	24
7	Poland	6	2	4	12
8	Belgium	4	2	2	8
9	Italy	3	8	5	16
10	Austria	3	6	3	12
11	Germany	2	0	3	5
12	Latvia	1	0	0	1
13	Estonia	0	1	2	3
14	France	0	1	1	2
14	Switzerland	0	1	1	2
16	Hungary	0	0	1	1
Totals (16 entries)		155	141	141	437

Unofficial European Championships of 1891, 1892 and 1946 (not recognized by the ISU) included

== Multiple medalists ==
Boldface denotes active skaters and highest medal count among all skaters (including these who not included in these tables) per type.

=== Allround and Sprint Championships ===
Rank	Skater	Country	From	To	Gold	Silver	Bronze	Total
1	Sven Kramer	Netherlands	2005	2019	**10**	1	–	**11**
2	Rintje Ritsma	Netherlands	1992	2003	6	2	2	10
3	Clas Thunberg	Finland	1922	1932	4	**4**	–	8
4	Ivar Ballangrud	Norway	1927	1938	4	–	2	6
5	Oscar Mathisen	Norway	1908	1914	3	2	1	6
6	Hjalmar Andersen	Norway	1949	1954	3	2	–	5
7	Ard Schenk	Netherlands	1966	1972	3	1	–	4
8	Rudolf Gundersen	Norway	1901	1906	3	–	–	3
9	Knut Johannesen	Norway	1956	1963	2	3	1	6
10	Kay Arne Stenshjemmet	Norway	1976	1981	2	2	1	5

=== All events ===
Rank	Skater	Country	From	To	Gold	Silver	Bronze	Total
1	Sven Kramer	Netherlands	2005	2022	**12**	2	–	**14**
2	**Patrick Roest**	Netherlands	2019	2024	7	1	2	10
3	Rintje Ritsma	Netherlands	1992	2003	6	2	2	10
4	**Pavel Kulizhnikov**	Russia	2018	2020	5	–	1	6
5	Clas Thunberg	Finland	1922	1932	4	**4**	–	8
6	**Bart Swings**	Belgium	2016	2026	4	1	2	7
7	Ivar Ballangrud	Norway	1927	1938	4	–	2	6
8	Jan Blokhuijsen	Netherlands	2011	2018	3	**4**	1	8
9	Thomas Krol	Netherlands	2018	2022	3	3	–	6
10	Oscar Mathisen	Norway	1908	1914	3	2	1	6

== See also ==
- European Speed Skating Championships for Women
- World Allround Speed Skating Championships for Men
