= 1980 World Allround Speed Skating Championships =

International speed skating competition

1980 World Allround Speed Skating Championships for Men
- Venue: Thialf, Heerenveen, Netherlands
- Dates: 1–2 March
- Competitors: 33 skaters from 14 nations

Medalist men
1st place, gold medalist(s)		Hilbert van der Duim	NED
2nd place, silver medalist(s)		Eric Heiden	USA
3rd place, bronze medalist(s)		Tom Erik Oxholm	NOR

The World Allround Speed Skating Championships for Men took place on 1 and 2 March 1980 in Heerenveen at the Thialf ice rink.

Title holder was the American Eric Heiden.

== Result ==
Rank	Skater	Country	Points Samalog	500m	5000m	1500m	10,000m
1st place, gold medalist(s)	Hilbert van der Duim	Netherlands	171.747	40.33 (5)	7:21.57 (2)	2:02.57 (gold)	15:27.94 (9)
2nd place, silver medalist(s)	Eric Heiden	United States	171.879	39.82 (gold)	7:25.37 (6)	2:03.87 (2)	15:24.65 (6)
3rd place, bronze medalist(s)	Tom Erik Oxholm	Norway	172.330	40.33 (5)	7:14.51 (gold)	2:06.30 (12)	15:28.99 (10)
4	Amund Martin Sjøbrend	Norway	173.270	41.36 (16)	7:22.04 (3)	2:04.54 (5)	15:23.86 (5)
5	Kay Arne Stenshjemmet	Norway	173.694	40.00 (3)	7:24.93 (4)	2:08.85 (22)	15:25.02 (7)
6	Øyvind Tveter	Norway	173.707	41.12 (12)	7:32.10 (13)	2:06.41 (15)	15:04.83 (2)
7	Mike Woods	United States	173.983	42.06 (24)	7:31.91 (12)	2:04.84 (6)	15:02.39 (gold)
8	Andreas Ehrig	East Germany	174.531	40.63 (8)	7:28.60 (8)	2:05.77 (10)	15:42.36 (13)
9	Piet Kleine	Netherlands	174.577	41.46 (17)	7:27.71 (7)	2:05.12 (9)	15:32.81 (11)
10	Sergey Marchuk	Soviet Union	174.688	41.61 (18)	7:30.23 (9)	2:06.37 (14)	15:18.64 (4)
11	Viktor Lyoskin	Soviet Union	174.750	42.00 (23)	7:33.58 (15)	2:04.99 (7)	15:14.58 (3)
12	Jan Junell	Sweden	174.959	41.24 (14)	7:33.99 (16)	2:05.91 (11)	15:27.00 (8)
13	Masayuki Kawahara	Japan	175.978	41.92 (21)	7:32.29 (14)	2:05.08 (8)	15:42.72 (14)
14	Dmitry Bochkaryov	Soviet Union	176.238	41.32 (15)	7:31.37 (11)	2:07.93 (19)	15:42.76 (15)
15	Dmitry Ogloblin	Soviet Union	177.525	42.69 (27)	7:34.07 (17)	2:07.97 (20)	15:35.45 (12)
NC	Pertti Niittylä	Finland	127.003	40.48 (7)	7:31.17 (10)	2:04.22 (4)	16:25.47 (DQ)
17	Frits Schalij	Netherlands	128.525	40.65 (9)	7:36.72 (20)	2:06.61 (16)	–
18	Andreas Dietel	East Germany	129.278	40.00 (3)	7:34.35 (19)	2:11.53 (29)	–
19	Ulf Ekstrand	Sweden	129.701	41.89 (20)	7:36.91 (21)	2:06.36 (13)	–
20	Claes Bengtsson	Sweden	129.903	41.13 (13)	7:42.53 (25)	2:07.56 (17)	–
21	Tom Plant	United States	130.001	39.95 (2)	7:54.85 (29)	2:07.70 (18)	–
22	Craig Webster	Canada	130.733	40.82 (10)	7:50.20 (27)	2:08.68 (21)	–
23	Masahiko Yamamoto	Japan	130.958	41.02 (11)	7:45.28 (26)	2:10.23 (25)	–
24	Yasuhiro Shimizu	Japan	131.758	42.57 (26)	7:39.95 (23)	2:09.58 (24)	–
25	Wolfgang Scharf	West Germany	131.859	42.75 (28)	7:39.49 (22)	2:09.48 (23)	–
26	Colin Coates	Austria	131.888	42.98 (30)	7:34.32 (18)	2:10.43 (26)	–
27	Włodzimierz Was	Poland	132.224	42.51 (25)	7:40.94 (24)	2:10.86 (27)	–
28	Mike Plant	United States	134.404	41.86 (19)	7:59.58 (30)	2:13.76 (30)	–
29	Olivier Belle	France	136.360	42.84 (29)	8:01.54 (31)	2:16.10 (31)	–
30	Mike Richmond	Australia	138.860	41.97 (22)	8:27.14 (32)	2:18.53 (32)	–
31	Antonio Gómez Fernández	Spain	162.663	53.18 (31)	9:23.80 (33)	2:39.31 (33)	–
NC	Werner Jäger	Austria	91.123	DQ	7:52.93 (28)	2:11.49 (28)	–
NC	Yep Kramer	Netherlands	85.807	DQ	7:24.94 (5)	2:03.94 (3)	–

DQ = Disqualified

== Attribution ==
In Dutch
