= Hilbert van der Duim =

Dutch speed skater

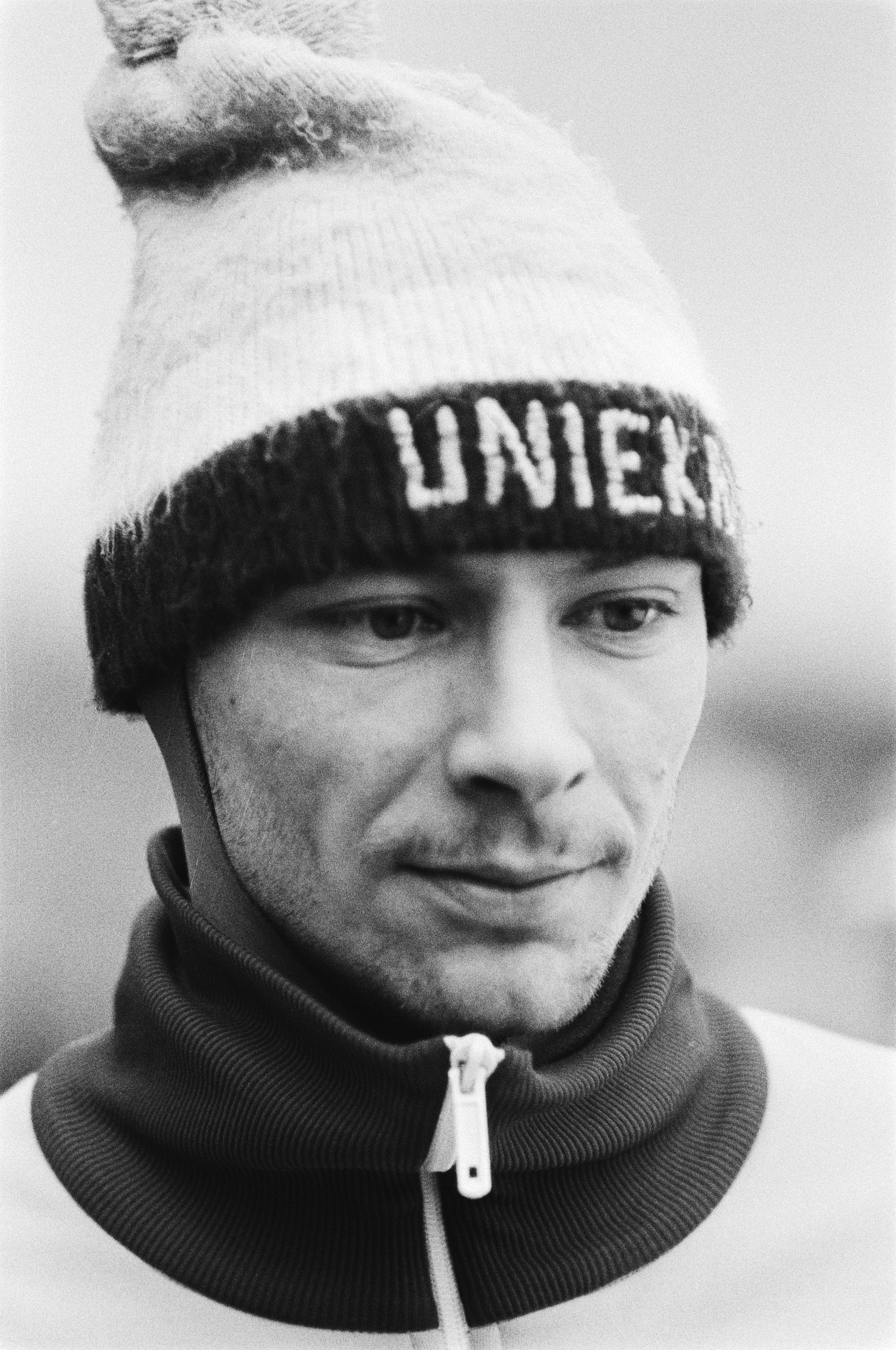

Personal information
- Nationality: Dutch
- Born: 4 August 1957 (age 68) Beetsterzwaag, Netherlands

Sport
- Country: Netherlands
- Sport: Speed skating
- Turned pro: 1979
- Retired: 1987

Achievements and titles
- Personal best(s): 500 m: 37.70 (1982); 1000 m: 1:15.80 (1981); 1500 m: 1:57.57 (1985); 3000 m: 4:06.59 (1983); 5000 m: 6:59.73 (1982); 10 000 m: 14:27.81 (1982)
Medal record
Men's speed skating
Representing the Netherlands
World Allround Championships
Gold medal – first place	1980 Heerenveen	Allround
Gold medal – first place	1982 Assen	Allround
Bronze medal – third place	1984 Gothenburg	Allround
Bronze medal – third place	1985 Hamar	Allround
World Sprint Championships
Bronze medal – third place	1983 Helsinki	Sprint
European Allround Championships
Gold medal – first place	1983 The Hague	Allround
Gold medal – first place	1984 Larvik	Allround
Silver medal – second place	1981 Deventer	Allround
Bronze medal – third place	1982 Oslo	Allround
Dutch Allround Championships
Gold medal – first place	1979 Heerenveen	Allround
Gold medal – first place	1980 Den Haag	Allround
Gold medal – first place	1981 Assen	Allround
Gold medal – first place	1982 Heerenveen	Allround
Gold medal – first place	1983 Deventer	Allround
Gold medal – first place	1984 Groningen	Allround
Gold medal – first place	1985 Alkmaar	Allround
Silver medal – second place	1978 Eindhoven	Allround
Dutch Sprint Championships
Bronze medal – third place	1983 Utrecht	Sprint
Bronze medal – third place	1985 Utrecht	Sprint
Dutch Marathon Championships
Gold medal – first place	1987 Eernewoude	Natural Ice

Hilbert van der Duim (born 4 August 1957) is a Dutch former speed skater. A two-time world and European champion, Van der Duim "won often but also fell often", and has become famous for some of the incidents that happened to him during his career.

== Career ==
Hilbert van der Duim became World Allround Champion in 1980, was the first skater in four years to beat Eric Heiden in international competition. He became World Allround Champion again in 1982. He also was European Allround Champion twice (in 1983 and 1984) and became Dutch Allround Champion a record number of seven times, winning seven consecutive national Allround titles in the years 1979-1985.

He participated in the Winter Olympics, twice (in 1980 and 1984), but his highest finish was fourth place in the 5,000 meters in 1980 in Lake Placid. In 1986, Van der Duim switched to marathon skating and impressed by his high skating speed. On 28 November 1986, he became World Hour Record holder, skating 39,492.80 metres in one hour. He was forced to end his skating career when he was involved in a severe automobile accident in 1987, driving home after a marathon.

Van der Duim was of the last generation of skaters before the commercialization of the sport in the Netherlands; the Dutch skating league had such strict rules against advertising, for instance, that Van der Duim was threatened with expulsion after he appeared on television with the name of a sponsor on his hat. After his skating career, Van der Duim became a teacher, teaching economics at Drenthe College, and in the late 1990s he was also active in local politics, taking a seat on the city council of Assen for a populist party.

== Incidents ==
Van der Duim gained fame as a colourful skater because of several incidents. At the European Allround Championships in 1981, he fell on the 10,000 m and finished this distance in a time of 15:28.53 (for comparison: during the European Championships the year before, he had skated a time of 15:06.29). His fall probably cost him the title – he won European Allround silver 0.728 points (equivalent to 14.56 seconds on the 10,000 m) behind Amund Sjøbrend. After his 10,000 m race, Van der Duim explained that skating over "bird poop" had made him fall, causing widespread speculation in the Dutch popular press over the nature of the bird. Later, Van der Duim admitted there had been no excrement, but the episode has come to stand for any unexplained failure in Dutch sports.

On the 5,000 m at the World Allround Championships that same year, he sprinted to the finish line one lap too soon and it took him some time to understand what people were trying to tell him – that he had one more lap to go. His chances to successfully defend his World Allround Championships title were ruined when he fell on the 1,500 m the next day.

At the 1983 World Allround Championships in Oslo, Van der Duim was still the reigning World Allround Champion, and he made his appearance in a "rainbow speed skating suit", a white suit with coloured stripes, influenced by the rainbow jersey used by reigning World Champions in bicycle racing. After an excellent 500 m race, he finished only 17th on the 5,000 m and therefore did not qualify for the final distance, the 10,000 m. After his disastrous 5,000 m race, Van der Duim declared that he had "porridge in his legs".

== Personal records ==
Personal records
Men's Speed skating
Event	Result	Date	Location	Notes
500m	37.70	10 February 1982	Davos	Hand clocked
1,000m	1:15.80	31 January 1981	Davos	
1,500m	1:57.57	20 January 1985	Davos	
3,000m	4:06.59	10 February 1983	Inzell	
5,000m	6:59.73	3 January 1982	Inzell	
10,000m	14:27.81	7 March 1982	Inzell	

Source: www.isu.org

Van der Duim has an Adelskalender score of 162.253 points. His highest ranking on the Adelskalender was a 3rd place.

== World records ==
Event	Result	Date	Venue	Note
1000 meter	1:19.41	8 March 1977	Savalen	Junior world record until 30 January 1981
World one hour record	39.4928 km	28 November 1986	Heerenveen	Unofficial world record, did not use clap skates

== Tournament overview ==
Season	Dutch Championships Allround	Dutch Championships Sprint	European Championships Allround	Olympic Games	World Championships Allround	World Championships Sprint	World Championships Junior Allround
1975–76							MADONNA di CAMPIGLIO 6th 500m 20th 1500m DQ 1000m DNQ 5000m NC overall
1976–77							INZELL (silver) 500m 6th 1500m 7th 1000m (silver) 5000m (bronze) overall
1977–78	EINDHOVEN (silver) 500m (silver) 5000m (silver) 1500m (silver) 10000m (silver) overall		OSLO 6th 500m 12th 5000m 18th 1500m 9th 10000m 11th overall		GOTHENBURG 7th 500m 7th 5000m 14th 1500m 6th 10000m 9th overall		MONTREAL 33rd 500m 6th 1500m (bronze) 1000m (silver) 5000m 16th overall
1978–79	HEERENVEEN (silver) 500m (gold) 5000m (gold) 1500m (gold) 10000m (gold) overall		DEVENTER 4th 500m 7th 5000m 11th 1500m 12th 10000m 6th overall		OSLO 10th 500m 5th 5000m 32nd 1500m 14th 10000m 16th overall		
1979–80	THE HAGUE (silver) 500m (bronze) 5000m (gold) 1500m (bronze) 10000m (gold) overall		TRONDHEIM 4th 500m 9th 5000m 6th 1500m 9th 10000m 5th overall	LAKE PLACID 28th 500m 21st 1000m 11th 1500m 4th 5000m 6th 10000m	HEERENVEEN 5th 500m (silver) 5000m (gold) 1500m 9th 10000m (gold) overall		
1980–81	ASSEN (silver) 500m (gold) 5000m (silver) 1500m (gold) 10000m (gold) overall		DEVENTER (gold) 500m (silver) 5000m 5th 1500m 8th 10000m (silver) overall		OSLO 6th 500m 9th 5000m 33rd 1500m (silver) 10000m 16th overall	GRENOBLE 9th 500m 4th 1000m 10th 500m 15th 1000m 7th overall	
1981–82	HEERENVEEN (silver) 500m (gold) 5000m (silver) 1500m (gold) 10000m (gold) overall		OSLO (gold) 500m 9th 5000m 4th 1500m (bronze) 10000m (bronze) overall		ASSEN 4th 500m (bronze) 5000m (gold) 1500m 4th 10000m (gold) overall		
1982–83	DEVENTER (gold) 500m (silver) 5000m 5th 1500m (silver) 10000m (gold) overall	UTRECHT 4th 500m 4th 1000m (bronze) 500m (silver) 1000m (bronze) overall	THE HAGUE 5th 500m 13th 5000m (gold) 1500m (silver) 10000m (gold) overall		OSLO (silver) 500m 17th 5000m 10th 1500m DNQ 10000m NC overall	HELSINKI 11th 500m (bronze) 1000m 9th 500m (silver) 1000m (bronze) overall	
1983–84	GRONINGEN (gold) 500m (bronze) 5000m 4th 1500m (silver) 10000m (gold) overall		LARVIK (gold) 500m 7th 5000m (bronze) 1500m 7th 10000m (gold) overall	SARAJEVO 7th 1000m 7th 1500m 9th 5000m 10th 10000m	GOTHENBURG (gold) 500m (bronze) 5000m 8th 1500m 11th 10000m (bronze) overall		
1984–85	ALKMAAR (gold) 500m (gold) 5000m (silver) 1500m (silver) 10000m (gold) overall	UTRECHT 6th 500m (silver) 1000m 5th 500m (gold) 1000m (bronze) overall	ESKILSTUNA 4th 500m 7th 5000m 11th 1500m (silver) 10000m 4th overall		HAMAR 4th 500m (silver) 5000m 11th 1500m 6th 10000m (bronze) overall	HEERENVEEN 13th 500m 9th 1000m 22nd 500m 7th 1000m 8th overall	

DNQ = Did not qualify for the last distance
NC = No classification

== Medals won ==
Championship	Gold (gold)	Silver (silver)	Bronze (bronze)
Dutch Allround Classification	7	1	0
Dutch Allround Single Event	12	15	3
Dutch Sprint Classification	0	0	2
Dutch Sprint Single Event	1	2	1
European Allround Classification	2	1	1
European Allround Single Event	4	3	1
Olympic Games	0	0	0
World Allround Classification	2	0	2
World Allround Single Event	3	4	2
World Sprint Classification	0	0	1
World Sprint Single Event	0	1	1
World Junior Allround Classification	0	0	1
World Junior Allround Single Event	0	3	1

Olympic Games
Preceded by Piet Kleine	Flagbearer for Netherlands; Sarajevo 1984	Succeeded by Jan Ykema
