= Sten Stensen =

Norwegian speed skater

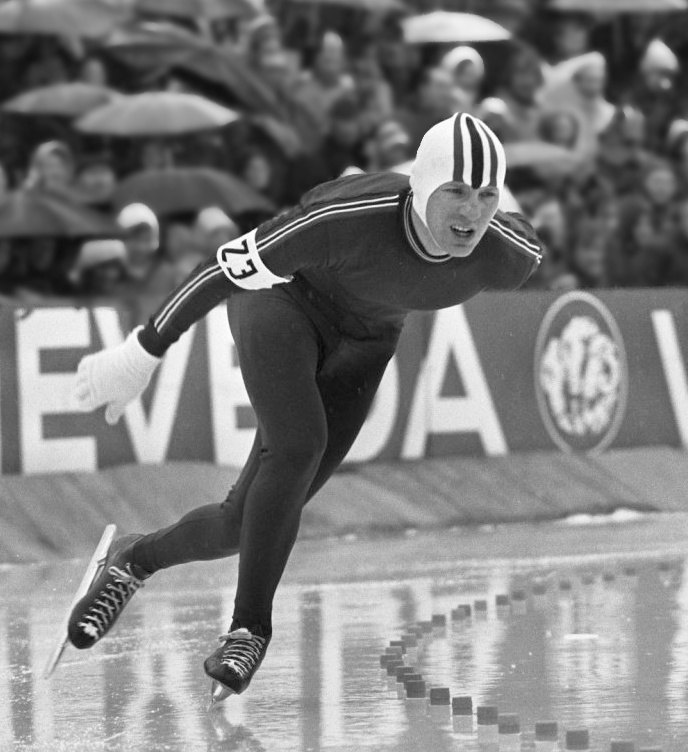
- Sten Stensen in 1973

Personal information
- Nationality: Norwegian
- Born: Sten Einar Stensen; 18 December 1947 (age 78) Drammen, Norway
- Height: 1.83 m (6 ft 0 in)
- Weight: 74 kg (163 lb)

Sport
- Country: Norway
- Sport: Speed skating
- Club: Drammens SK
- Turned pro: 1969
- Retired: 1978

Achievements and titles
- Personal best(s): 500 m: 39.03 (1977); 1000 m: 1:23.4 (1973); 1500 m: 1:58.72 (1976); 3000 m: 4:13.6 (1977); 5000 m: 7:05.04 (1977); 10 000 m: 14:38.08 (1976)
Medal record
Representing Norway
Olympic Games
| Gold medal – first place | 1976 Innsbruck | 5,000 m |
| Silver medal – second place | 1976 Innsbruck | 10,000 m |
| Bronze medal – third place | 1972 Sapporo | 5,000 m |
| Bronze medal – third place | 1972 Sapporo | 10,000 m |

Sten Einar Stensen (born 18 December 1947) is a former speed skater. Together with Amund Sjøbrend, Kay Stenshjemmet, and Jan Egil Storholt, he was one of the legendary four S-es ("four aces" in Norwegian), contemporary Norwegian top skaters in the 1970s and early 1980s. Stensen excelled at the longer distances, especially the 5,000 m and 10,000 m, and set two world records. He was World Allround Champion in 1974 and European Allround Champion in 1975. He also won Olympic gold on the 5,000 m in Innsbruck in 1976. For his accomplishments, he received the Oscar Mathisen Award in 1974 and 1976.

During the 1976 European Allround Championships in Oslo, Stensen (the defending European Champion), set a new world record on the 10,000 m, but he still lost his title to fellow Norwegian Kay Stenshjemmet by a tiny margin of only 0.005 points (equivalent to 0.10 seconds on the 10,000 m).

Stensen won gold on the 5,000 m at the 1976 Winter Olympics the next month, a race in which Piet Kleine won silver and the world record holder on that distance, Hans van Helden, won bronze. Still being the world record holder on the 10,000 m, Stensen was the favourite for that distance three days later, but he was beaten by Kleine in a close race. Again, Van Helden finished third.

After ending his speed skating career in 1978, Stensen became a Norwegian broadcasting commentator at speed skating events.

== Medals ==
An overview of medals won by Stensen at important championships he participated in, listing the years in which he won each:

| Championships | Gold medal | Silver medal | Bronze medal |
|---|---|---|---|
| Winter Olympics | 1976 (5,000 m) | 1976 (10,000 m) | 1972 (5,000 m); 1972 (10,000 m) |
| World Allround | 1974 | 1973; 1976 | 1977 |
| European Allround | 1975 | 1976; 1978 | – |
| Norwegian Allround | 1973; 1974 | 1976; 1977; 1978 | 1971; 1972 |

== Records ==
=== World records ===
Over the course of his career, Stensen skated two world records:

| Discipline | Time | Date | Location |
|---|---|---|---|
| 10,000 m | 14.50,31 | 25 January 1976 | (Norway) Oslo |
| 10,000 m | 14.38,08 | 21 March 1976 | (Soviet Union) Medeo |

=== Personal records ===
| Event | Result | Date | Venue |
|---|---|---|---|
| 500 m | 39.03 | 19 March 1977 | Medeo |
| 1,000 m | 1:23.44 | 7 January 1973 | Kongsberg |
| 1,500 m | 1:58.72 | 21 March 1976 | Medeo |
| 3,000 m | 4:13.6 | 17 December 1977 | Hamar |
| 5,000 m | 7:05.04 | 19 March 1977 | Medeo |
| 10,000 m | 14:38.08 | 21 March 1976 | Medeo |
| Big combination | 165.316 | 20 March 1977 | Medeo |

Stensen has an Adelskalender score of 165.011 points. His highest ranking on the Adelskalender was a fourth place.

Awards
| Preceded by (Sweden) Göran Claeson | Oscar Mathisen Award; 1974 | Succeeded by (Soviet Union) Yevgeny Kulikov |
| Preceded by (Soviet Union) Yevgeny Kulikov | Oscar Mathisen Award; 1976 | Succeeded by (United States) Eric Heiden |
