= Van der Duim =

Van der Duim is a Dutch surname. Notable people with the surname include:

- Antal van der Duim (born 1987), Dutch tennis player
- Dirk van der Duim (1908–1980), Dutch speed skater
- Hilbert van der Duim (born 1957), Dutch speed skater
