= Yep Kramer =

Dutch speed skater

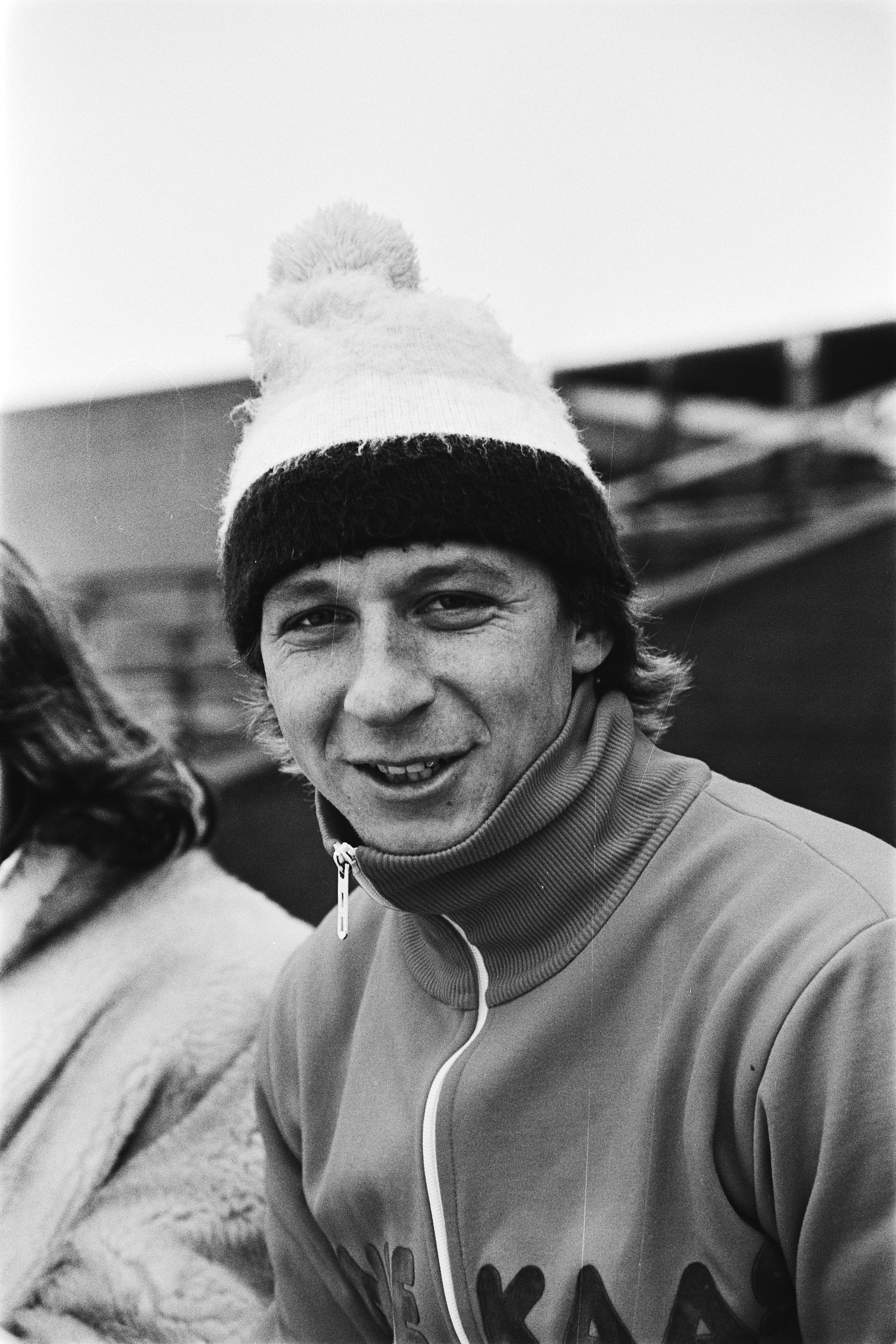

Personal information
- Born: 15 November 1957 (age 68) Nieuweschoot, Netherlands

Sport
- Country: Netherlands
- Sport: Speed skating
- Turned pro: 1976
- Retired: 1992

Achievements and titles
- Personal best(s): 500 m: 38.6 (1982); 1000 m: 1:17.17 (1981); 1500 m: 1:57.42 (1983); 3000 m: 4:06.75 (1983); 5000 m: 7:04.97 (1992); 10 000 m: 14:03.92 (1987)
Medal record
Men's speed skating
Representing the Netherlands
European Championships
Silver medal – second place	1983 The Hague	All round
Dutch Marathon Championships
Gold medal – first place	1995 Ermerzand	Natural Ice

Yep Kramer (born 15 November 1957) is a Dutch-Frisian long track and marathon speed skater. He is the father of speed skaters Sven Kramer and Brecht Kramer.

In 1985, 1986 and 1997 he participated in the Elfstedentocht (Eleven Cities Tour), the world's largest speed skating competition. In 1997 he finished the almost 200 km long race in 8th position.

In 1993 and 1996 he participated in the Dutch natural track marathon championships (100 km). In 1993 he came in 4th and in 1996 he won the Dutch natural track marathon championships (100 km).

== Personal records ==
To put these personal records in perspective, the WR column lists the official world records on the dates that Kramer skated his personal records.

Event	Result	Date	Venue	WR
500 m	38.6	14 February 1982	Davos	36.91
1,000 m	1:17.17	31 January 1981	Davos	1:13.60
1,500 m	1:57.42	6 March 1983	Inzell	1:54.79
3,000 m	4:06.75	3 March 1983	Inzell	4:04.06
5,000 m	7:04.97	2 January 1992	Heerenveen	6:41.73
10,000 m	14:49.5	2 March 1987	Heerenveen	14:03.92
Big combination	166.844	6 March 1983	Inzell	162.973

Kramer has an Adelskalender score of 164.712 points.

== Tournament overview ==
Season	Dutch Championships Single Distances	Dutch Championships Allround	Dutch Championships Sprint	European Championships Allround	World Championships Allround	Olympic Games	World Championships Junior Allround
1975–1976							MADONNA di CAMPIGLIO 29th 500m 12th 3000m 11th 1500m 14th 5000m 15th overall
1976–1977							INZELL 13th 500m (silver) 3000m 5th 1500m 4th 5000m 5th overall
1977–1978		EINDHOVEN 10th 500m 8th 5000m 6th 1500m 8th 10000m 6th overall					
1978–1979		HEERENVEEN 4th 500m 4th 5000m (silver) 1500m 4th 10000m (silver) overall			OSLO 16th 500m 10th 5000m 14th 1500m 12th 10000m 11th overall		
1979–1980		THE HAGUE 7th 500m (gold) 5000m 4th 1500m 4th 10000m (silver) overall		TRONDHEIM 7th 500m 6th 5000m 11th 1500m 12th 10000m 7th overall	HEERENVEEN DQ 500m 5th 5000m (bronze) 1500m DNQ 10000m NC overall	LAKE PLACID 9th 5000m 11th 10000m	
1980–1981		ASSEN 5th 500m 4th 5000m 4th 1500m 4th 10000m 4th overall		DEVENTER 11th 500m 12th 5000m 7th 1500m 11th 10000m 11th overall	OSLO 22nd 500m 19th 5000m 20th 1500m DNQ 10000m NC overall(22nd)		
1981–1982		HEERENVEEN 5th 500m 6th 5000m 4th 1500m 5th 10000m 4th overall		OSLO 9th 500m 17th 5000m 19th 1500m DNQ 10000m NC overall(18th)	ASSEN 31st 500m 14th 5000m 12th 1500m 12th 10000m 16th overall		
1982–1983		DEVENTER 5th 500m 4th 5000m (silver) 1500m 4th 10000m 4th overall	UTRECHT 5th 500m (gold) 1000m 9th 500m (gold) 1000m 4th overall	THE HAGUE 5th 500m (bronze) 5000m (bronze) 1500m 7th 10000m (silver) overall	OSLO 11th 500m (silver) 5000m 5th 1500m 6th 10000m 4th overall		
1983–1984		GRONINGEN 7th 500m (silver) 5000m (bronze) 1500m 4th 10000m (bronze) overall		LARVIK 11th 500m 9th 5000m 7th 1500m 8th 10000m 7th overall	GOTHENBURG 6th 500m 6th 5000m 6th 1500m 13th 10000m 6th overall	SARAJEVO 9th 10000m	
1984–1985							
1985–1986		ASSEN 9th 500m 9th 5000m 6th 1500m 8th 10000m 6th overall	UTRECHT 6th 500m 17th 1000m 15th 500m 12th overall	OSLO 13th 500m 14th 5000m 19th 1500m 11th 10000m 12th overall			
1991–1992	HEERENVEEN 8th 5000m						

== Medals won ==
Championship	Gold (gold)	Silver (silver)	Bronze (bronze)
Dutch Allround Classification	0	2	1
Dutch Allround Single Event	1	1	1
Dutch Sprint Single Event	2	0	0
European Allround Classification	0	1	0
European Allround Single Event	0	0	2
World Allround Single Event	0	1	1
World Junior Allround Single Event	0	1	0
