= 1984 World Allround Speed Skating Championships =

Skating Championship

1984 World Allround Speed Skating Championships for Men
- Venue: Ullevi, Gothenburg
- Dates: 25–26 February
- Competitors: 34 skaters from 14 nations

Medalist men
1st place, gold medalist(s)		Oleg Bozhev	SOV
2nd place, silver medalist(s)		Andreas Ehrig	DDR
3rd place, bronze medalist(s)		Hilbert van der Duim	NED

The World Allround Speed Skating Championships for Men took place on 25 and 26 February 1984 in Gothenburg at the Ullevi outdoor stadium temporary ice rink.

Title holder was the Norwegian Rolf Falk-Larssen.

== Classification ==
Rank	Skater	Country	Points Samalog	500m	5000m	1500m	10,000m
1st place, gold medalist(s)	Oleg Bozhev	Soviet Union	169.663	39.50 (5)	7:22.48 (8)	1:59.62 (gold)	15:20.85 (8)
2nd place, silver medalist(s)	Andreas Ehrig	East Germany	170.283	39.49 (4)	7:21.31 (4)	2:01.84 (3)	15:20.99 (9)
3rd place, bronze medalist(s)	Hilbert van der Duim	Netherlands	170.678	39.06 (gold)	7:20.57 (3)	2:03.50 (8)	15:27.90 (11)
4	Rolf Falk-Larssen	Norway	170.729	39.33 (3)	7:21.69 (5)	2:02.46 (4)	15:28.20 (12)
5	Michael Hadschieff	Austria	171.114	40.40 (10)	7:22.59 (10)	2:04.32 (12)	15:00.30 (gold)
6	Yep Kramer	Netherlands	171.336	39.78 (6)	7:22.18 (6)	2:02.76 (6)	15:28.37 (13)
7	Frits Schalij	Netherlands	171.667	40.47 (15)	7:24.55 (15)	2:01.58 (2)	15:24.32 (10)
8	Igor Malkov	Soviet Union	172.213	41.27 (24)	7:18.60 (22)	2:04.43 (13)	15:12.15 (4)
9	Pertti Niittylä	Finland	172.748	41.45 (26)	7:24.39 (14)	2:02.64 (5)	15:19.58 (7)
10	Hans van Helden	France	172.899	40.30 (8)	7:29.32 (22)	2:03.02 (7)	15:33.22 (15)
11	Geir Karlstad	Norway	173.175	41.88 (28)	7:17.62 (gold)	2:05.88 (22)	15:11.47 (3)
12	Mike Woods	United States	173.205	41.97 (29)	7:22.48 (9)	2:04.31 (11)	15:11.02 (2)
13	Sergey Berezin	Soviet Union	173.349	41.14 (22)	7:22.91 (11)	2:04.43 (13)	15:28.84 (14)
14	Mark Mitchell	United States	173.520	40.45 (14)	7:22.27 (7)	2:05.36 (19)	15:41.14 (16)
15	René Schöfisch	East Germany	175.047	42.56 (31)	7:23.35 (13)	2:07.37 (28)	15:13.92 (5)
16	Henry Nilsen	Norway	175.052	42.25 (30)	7:23.02 (12)	2:07.98 (29)	15:16.81 (6)
NC17	Werner Jäger	Austria	126.982	41.08 (21)	7:25.06 (16)	2:04.19 (10)	−
NC18	Bjørn Arne Nyland	Norway	126.984	40.16 (7)	7:29.71 (23)	2:05.56 (21)	−
NC19	Claes Bengtsson	Sweden	126.995	40.63 (16)	7:28.09 (19)	2:04.67 (16)	−
NC20	Tomas Gustafson	Sweden	127.010	40.41 (11)	7:28.70 (21)	2:05.19 (17)	−
NC21	Toshiaki Imamura	Japan	127.586	40.96 (18)	7:28.43 (20)	2:05.35 (18)	−
NC22	Dmitry Bochkaryov	Soviet Union	127.610	40.67 (17)	7:33.90 (27)	2:04.65 (15)	−
NC23	Christian Eminger	Austria	127.840	41.65 (27)	7:30.14 (25)	2:03.53 (9)	−
NC24	Jan Junell	Sweden	128.159	41.05 (20)	7:30.99 (26)	2:06.03 (23)	−
NC25	Robert Vunderink	Netherlands	128.428	41.42 (25)	7:26.62 (18)	2:07.04 (26)	−
NC26	Masahito Shinohara	Japan	128.764	40.97 (19)	7:30.04 (24)	2:08.37 (30)	−
NC27	Piotr Krysiak	Poland	128.839	40.42 (12)	7:46.23 (30)	2:05.39 (20)	−
NC28	Jacques Thibault	Canada	130.326	39.28 (2)	8:07.10 (34)	2:07.01 (25)	−
NC29	Andreas Lemcke	West Germany	130.819	40.44 (13)	8:03.19 (33)	2:06.18 (24)	−
NC30	Wolfgang Scharf	West Germany	131.162	42.91 (32)	7:39.06 (29)	2:07.04 (26)	−
NC31	Marc Vernier	France	131.261	40.34 (9)	7:55.08 (31)	2:10.24 (31)	−
NC32	Colin Coates	Australia	132.524	43.04 (33)	7:37.84 (28)	2:11.10 (32)	−
NC33	Jean Pichette	Canada	132.688	41.22 (23)	7:57.28 (32)	2:11.22 (33)	−
NC	Frank Nauschütz	East Germany		43.98 (34)	7:26.36 (17)	DNS	−

== Attribution ==
In Dutch
