= Jan Egil Storholt =

Norwegian speed skater (born 1949)

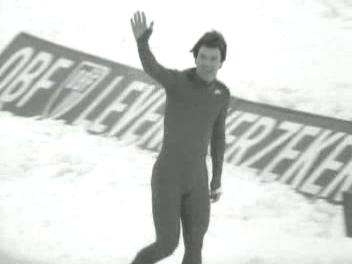
- Jan Egil Storholt in 1979

Personal information
- Nationality: Norwegian
- Born: 13 February 1949 (age 77) Løkken Verk, Norway
- Height: 1.83 m (6 ft 0 in)
- Weight: 80 kg (176 lb)

Sport
- Country: Norway
- Sport: Men's speed skating
- Club: Sportsklubben Falken

Achievements and titles
- Personal bests: 500 m: 38.07 (1977); 1000 m: 1:16.77 (1977); 1500 m: 1:55.18 (1977); 3000 m: 4:09.05 (1978); 5000 m: 7:01.16 (1977); 10 000 m: 14:49.26 (1978)
Medal record
Representing Norway
Men's speed skating
Olympic Games
Gold medal – first place	1976 Innsbruck	1,500 m
World Championships
Silver medal – second place	1977 Heerenveen	Allround
Silver medal – second place	1978 Gothenburg	Allround
Silver medal – second place	1979 Oslo	Allround
Bronze medal – third place	1981 Oslo	Allround
European Championships
Gold medal – first place	1977 Larvik	Allround
Gold medal – first place	1979 Deventer	Allround
Silver medal – second place	1980 Trondheim	Allround
Bronze medal – third place	1976 Oslo	Allround
Bronze medal – third place	1978 Oslo	Allround

Jan Egil Storholt (born 13 February 1949) is a former speed skater from Norway. He was born in Løkken Verk which at the time was part of the Meldal municipality.

== Biography ==
Together with Amund Sjøbrend, Sten Stensen, and Kay Stenshjemmet, Jan Egil Storholt was one of the legendary four S-es (which sounds like "four aces" in Norwegian), four Norwegian top skaters in the 1970s and early 1980s.

Storholt grew up in the village of Løkken about 65 kilometres (40 mi) from Trondheim. He became a member of sports club Falken ("Falcon") in Trondheim. Falken was the club 1948 Olympic 1,500 m Champion Sverre Farstad and three-time 1952 Olympic Champion (on the 1,500 m, 5000 m, and 10000 m) Hjalmar Andersen had skated for.

Storholt was the Norwegian Junior Champion in 1969, but when he was almost killed in a mining accident in 1970, he was told he would probably not be able to compete at the highest levels again, and it seemed that his promising career had already come to an end. However, Storholt's determination got him back to the Norwegian top by 1972. After some of the best Norwegian speed skaters had turned professional in 1973 (and therefore also could no longer participate in the Olympic Games), Storholt suddenly was one of the best Norwegian amateurs.

It still took until 1976 for his first major international successes: After having won bronze at the European Allround Championships that year, Storholt went on to win Olympic gold on the 1,500 m in Innsbruck. This made him the third Olympic 1,500 m Champion for sports club Falken. In 1977 he became European Allround Champion and was narrowly defeated by Eric Heiden in the World Allround Championships. He won silver behind Heiden in three consecutive World Championships, and became European Allround Champion for the second time in 1979. This year he won his only Norwegian allround title as a senior.

Storholt ended his speed skating career in 1981, after having won bronze in the World Championships.

== Medals ==
An overview of medals won by Storholt at important championships he participated in, listing the years in which he won each:

Championships	Gold medal	Silver medal	Bronze medal
Winter Olympics	1976 (1500 m)	–	–
World Allround	–	1977; 1978; 1979	1981
World Sprint	–	–	–
European Allround	1977; 1979	1980	1976; 1978
Norwegian Allround	1979	1975	1977; 1978
Norwegian Sprint	–	1976; 1977; 1981	1974; 1980

== Records ==
=== World records ===
Over the course of his career, Storholt skated two world records:

Discipline	Time	Date	Location
1500 m	1.55,18	March 20, 1977	(Soviet Union) Medeo
Big combination	163.221	March 20, 1977	(Soviet Union) Medeo

Source: SpeedSkatingStats.com

=== Personal records ===
To put these personal records in perspective, the WR column lists the official world records on the dates that Storholt skated his personal records.

Event	Result	Date	Venue	WR
500 m	38.07	19 March 1977	Medeo	37.00
1000 m	1:16.77	3 January 1978	Oslo	1:15.33
1500 m	1:55.18	20 March 1977	Medeo	1:55.61
3000 m	4:09.05	2 March 1978	Inzell	4:08.3
5000 m	7:01.16	19 March 1977	Medeo	7:02.38
10000 m	14:49.26	19 March 1978	Medeo	14:33.34
Big combination	163.221	20 March 1977	Medeo	165.884

Note that Storholt's personal record on the 5,000 m was not a world record because Kay Stenshjemmet skated 6:56.9 at the same tournament.

Storholt was number one on the Adelskalender, the all-time allround speed skating ranking, for a total of 30 days, divided over two short periods in 1977 and 1978. He has an Adelskalender score of 163.042 points.
