= Yevhen Solunskiy =

Soviet speed skater

Personal information
- Nationality: Soviet
- Born: 13 June 1959
- Died: 5 December 1990 (aged 31)

Sport
- Sport: Speed skating

Yevhen Solunskiy (13 June 1959 – 5 December 1990) was a Soviet speed skater. He competed in the men's 1500 metres event at the 1980 Winter Olympics.
