= Speed skating at the 1980 Winter Olympics =

Speed skating at the XIII Olympic Winter Games
- Pictogram for speed skating
- Venue: James B. Sheffield Olympic Skating Rink
- Dates: February 14–23, 1980
- No. of events: 9
- Competitors: 127 from 20 nations

Speed skating at the 1980 Winter Olympics, was held from 9 February to 18 February. Nine events were contested at James B. Sheffield Olympic Skating Rink.

== Medal summary ==
=== Medal table ===
Rank	Nation	Gold	Silver	Bronze	Total
1	United States	5	2	1	8
2	Norway	1	2	4	7
3	Netherlands	1	2	1	4
4	East Germany	1	1	2	4
4	Soviet Union	1	1	2	4
6	Canada	0	1	0	1
Totals (6 entries)		9	9	10	28

The United States led the medal table with five gold medals, thanks to Eric Heiden's sweep of the men's events, which made him the first athlete to win five gold medals at a Winter Games.

Heiden led the individual medal table, while the most successful woman was Russian Nataliya Petrusyova, who won one gold and one bronze medal. American Leah Poulos-Mueller won two silver medals.

=== Men's events ===
Event	Gold		Silver		Bronze	
500 metres	Eric Heiden; United States	38.03 (OR)	Yevgeny Kulikov; Soviet Union	38.37	Lieuwe de Boer; Netherlands	38.48
1000 metres	Eric Heiden; United States	1:15.18 (OR)	Gaétan Boucher; Canada	1:16.68	Vladimir Lobanov; Soviet Union; Frode Rønning; Norway	1:16.91
1500 metres	Eric Heiden; United States	1:55.44 (OR)	Kay Stenshjemmet; Norway	1:56.81	Terje Andersen; Norway	1:56.92
5000 metres	Eric Heiden; United States	7:02.29 (OR)	Kay Stenshjemmet; Norway	7:03.28	Tom Erik Oxholm; Norway	7:05.59
10,000 metres	Eric Heiden; United States	14:28.13 WR	Piet Kleine; Netherlands	14:36.03	Tom Erik Oxholm; Norway	14:36.60

=== Women's events ===
Event	Gold		Silver		Bronze	
500 metres	Karin Enke; East Germany	41.78 (OR)	Leah Poulos-Mueller; United States	42.26	Natalya Petrusyova; Soviet Union	42.42
1000 metres	Natalya Petrusyova; Soviet Union	1:24.10 (OR)	Leah Poulos-Mueller; United States	1:25.41	Sylvia Albrecht; East Germany	1:26.46
1500 metres	Annie Borckink; Netherlands	2:10.95 (OR)	Ria Visser; Netherlands	2:12.35	Sabine Becker; East Germany	2:12.38
3000 metres	Bjørg Eva Jensen; Norway	4:32.13 (OR)	Sabine Becker; East Germany	4:32.79	Beth Heiden; United States	4:33.77

== Records ==
All previous Olympic records were broken in Lake Placid, along with one world record, from Eric Heiden in the final event, the men's 10000 metres.

Event	Date	Team	Time	OR	WR
Men's 500 metres	15 February	Eric Heiden (USA)	38.03	OR	
Men's 1000 metres	19 February	Eric Heiden (USA)	1:15.18	OR	
Men's 1500 metres	21 February	Eric Heiden (USA)	1:55.44	OR	
Men's 5000 metres	16 February	Eric Heiden (USA)	7:02.29	OR	
Men's 10000 metres	23 February	Eric Heiden (USA)	14:28.13	OR	WR
Women's 500 metres	15 February	Karin Enke (GDR)	41.78	OR	
Women's 1000 metres	17 February	Nataliya Petrusyova (URS)	1:24.10	OR	
Women's 1500 metres	14 February	Annie Borckink (NED)	2:10.95	OR	
Women's 3000 metres	20 February	Bjørg Eva Jensen (NOR)	4:32.13	OR	

== Participating NOCs ==
Nineteen nations competed in the speed skating events at Lake Placid. China and Romania made their debuts in the sport.

- Australia (2)
- Canada (7)
- China (13)
- Finland (3)
- France (1)
- West Germany (4)
- Great Britain (6)
- East Germany (9)
- Italy (3)
- Japan (8)
- South Korea (5)
- Mongolia (2)
- Netherlands (9)
- Norway (11)
- Poland (2)
- Romania (3)
- Switzerland (1)
- Soviet Union (16)
- United States (11)
