= Guo Chengjiang =

Chinese speed skater

Personal information
- Full name: 郭成江
- Nationality: Chinese
- Born: 17 June 1955 (age 69)

Sport
- Sport: Speed skating

Guo Chengjiang (born 17 June 1955) is a Chinese speed skater. He competed in the men's 1500 metres event at the 1980 Winter Olympics.
