= Piet Kleine =

Dutch speed skater (born 1951)

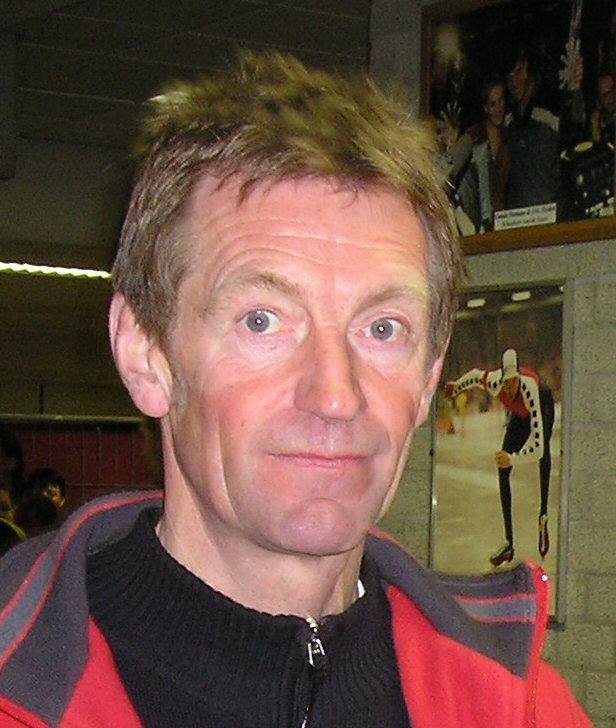
- Piet Kleine in 2006

Personal information
- Born: 17 September 1951 (age 74) Hollandscheveld, Netherlands
- Height: 1.88 m (6 ft 2 in)
- Weight: 86 kg (190 lb)

Sport
- Country: Netherlands
- Sport: Speed skating
- Turned pro: 1973
- Retired: 1981

Achievements and titles
- Personal best(s): 500 m: 40.10 (1981); 1000 m: 1:17.35 (1981); 1500 m: 1:56.28 (1976); 3000 m: 4:08.86 (1981); 5000 m: 7:02.38 1976); 10 000 m: 14:36.03 (1980)
Medal record
Men's speed skating
Representing the Netherlands
Olympic Games
Gold medal – first place	1976 Innsbruck	10000 m
Silver medal – second place	1980 Lake Placid	10000 m
Silver medal – second place	1976 Innsbruck	5000 m
World Allround Championships
Gold medal – first place	1976 Heerenveen	Allround
Bronze medal – third place	1973 Deventer	Allround
European Allround Championships
Bronze medal – third place	1975 Heerenveen	Allround

Pieter "Piet" Kleine (born 17 September 1951) is a former speed skater from the Netherlands who specialized in the longer distances.

== Short biography ==
At the 1976 Winter Olympics in Innsbruck, Piet Kleine became Olympic Champion on the 10,000 m, beating world record holder Sten Stensen – who won silver – in a close race. This was a reversal of the roles in the Olympic 5,000 m (which had been held three days earlier), in which Stensen had won gold and Kleine silver. In both the 5,000 m and the 10,000 m, Dutch – later French – speed skater Hans van Helden (then world record holder on the 5,000 m) won bronze. Later that same year (1976), Kleine broke 4 worlds records (including Van Helden's 5,000 m world record) and also became World Allround Champion.

Kleine participated again in the Winter Olympics of Lake Placid (1980), winning Olympic silver on the 10,000 m behind Eric Heiden. He ended his career as a speed skater in 1981 and started a successful career in amateur bicycle racing. In 1985, as a member of the Dutch national team, he finished 5th at the World Championships on the 100 km team time trial.

In 1986, Kleine became a marathon skater. This led to some controversy in 1997 when he finished 5th in the Elfstedentocht, but was subsequently removed from the final list of results because of a missing stamp on his stamp card. The controversy lay in the fact that, afterwards, it became clear that in the past several winners of the Elfstedentocht had missed stamps too, but were still declared the winners.

Kleine ended his skating career in 2001 and continued his profession as a postman, a profession he had always kept alongside his sports careers. In his free time, Kleine is the leader of a team of marathon skaters.

He later coached Dan Jansen.

== Records ==
=== World records ===
Over the course of his career, Kleine skated 4 world records:

Discipline	Result	Date	Location	Note
5000 meter	7:04.86	5 March 1976	Inzell	World record until 12 March 1976
5000 meter	7:02.38	12 March 1976	Inzell	World record until 19 March 1976
10000 meter	14:43.92	13 March 1976	Inzell	World record until 21 March 1976
Big combination	165.884	13 March 1976	Inzell	World record until 20 March 1977

Source: SpeedSkatingStats.com

=== Personal records ===
Personal records
Men's Speed skating
Event	Result	Date	Location	Notes
500 meter	40.10	30 January 1981	Davos	
1000 meter	1:17.35	30 January 1981	Davos	
1500 meter	1:56.28	13 March 1976	Inzell	
3000 meter	4:08.86	26 February 1981	Inzell	
5000 meter	7:02.38	12 March 1976	Inzell	
10000 meter	14:36.03	23 February 1980	Lake Placid	
Big combination	165.884	13 March 1976	Inzell	

Kleine has an Adelskalender score of 164.899 points. His highest ranking on the Adelskalender was 2nd place.

== Tournament overview ==
Season	Dutch Championships Allround	European Championships Allround	Olympic Games	World Championships Allround
1970–71	AMSTERDAM 11th 500m 9th 5000m 8th 1500m 9th 10000m 8th overall			
1971–72	DEVENTER 8th 500m 10th 5000m 10th 1500m 9th 10000m 8th overall			
1972–73	HEERENVEEN 5th 500m (bronze) 5000m (bronze) 1500m 4th 10000m (silver) overall	GRENOBLE 20th 500m 6th 5000m (bronze) 1500m 4th 10000m 5th overall		DEVENTER 8th 500m 4th 5000m (silver) 1500m (bronze) 10000m (bronze) overall
1973–74	ASSEN 6th 500m (bronze) 5000m (bronze) 1500m (gold) 10000m (silver) overall	ESKILSTUNA DQ 500m 10th 5000m 8th 1500m DQ 10000m DQ overall		INZELL 24th 500m 10th 5000m 7th 1500m 8th 10000m 10th overall
1974–75	ASSEN 13th 500m (silver) 5000m 4th 1500m (silver) 10000m (silver) overall	HEERENVEEN 14th 500m (silver) 5000m 10th 1500m 4th 10000m (bronze) overall		OSLO 25th 500m 10th 5000m 13th 1500m 5th 10000m 13th overall
1975–76	GRONINGEN 4th 500m (silver) 5000m (bronze) 1500m (gold) 10000m (silver) overall	OSLO 14th 500m 8th 5000m 9th 1500m 7th 10000m 8th overall	INNSBRUCK 18th 1000m 6th 1500m (silver) 5000m (gold) 10000m	INZELL 12th 500m (silver) 5000m (gold) 1500m (gold) 10000m (gold) overall
1976–77	ASSEN 8th 500m (gold) 5000m (silver) 1500m (gold) 10000m (silver) overall	LARVIK 22nd 500m (bronze) 5000m 9th 1500m (bronze) 10000m 7th overall		HEERENVEEN 19th 500m 7th 5000m 6th 1500m 5th 10000m 8th overall
1977–78	EINDHOVEN 9th 500m (gold) 5000m (gold) 1500m (gold) 10000m (gold) overall	OSLO 20th 500m 4th 5000m 10th 1500m 4th 10000m 9th overall		GOTHENBURG 22nd 500m (bronze) 5000m 11th 1500m 7th 10000m 10th overall
1978–79		DEVENTER 13th 500m (bronze) 5000m 10th 1500m (bronze) 10000m 5th overall		OSLO 21st 500m 9th 5000m 13th 1500m 10th 10000m 13th overall
1979–80	THE HAGUE 11th 500m (silver) 5000m 5th 1500m (gold) 10000m (bronze) overall	TRONDHEIM 15th 500m 7th 5000m 12th 1500m 7th 10000m 12th overall	LAKE PLACID 6th 5000m (silver) 10000m	HEERENVEEN 17th 500m 7th 5000m 9th 1500m 11th 10000m 9th overall
1980–81	ASSEN 7th 500m (silver) 5000m (bronze) 1500m (silver) 10000m (silver) overall	DEVENTER 18th 500m 4th 5000m 10th 1500m (silver) 10000m 8th overall		OSLO 27th 500m (gold) 5000m 12th 1500m 7th 10000m 10th overall

== Medals won ==
Championship	Gold (gold)	Silver (silver)	Bronze (bronze)
Olympic Games	1	2	0
World Allround	1	0	1
European Allround	0	0	1
Dutch Allround	1	6	1

== Medals ==
An overview of medals won by Kleine at important championships he participated in, listing the years in which he won each:

Championship	Gold	Silver	Bronze
Olympic Games	1976 (10000 m)	1976 (5000 m); 1980 (10000 m)	
World Allround	1976		1973
European Allround			1975
Dutch Allround	1978	1973; 1974; 1975; 1976; 1977; 1981	1980

Awards
Preceded by Jos Hermens	Dutch Sportsman of the Year; 1976	Succeeded by Hennie Kuiper
Olympic Games
Preceded by Dianne de Leeuw	Flagbearer for Netherlands; Lake Placid 1980	Succeeded by Hilbert van der Duim
