= Kay Stenshjemmet =

Norwegian speed skater (born 1953)

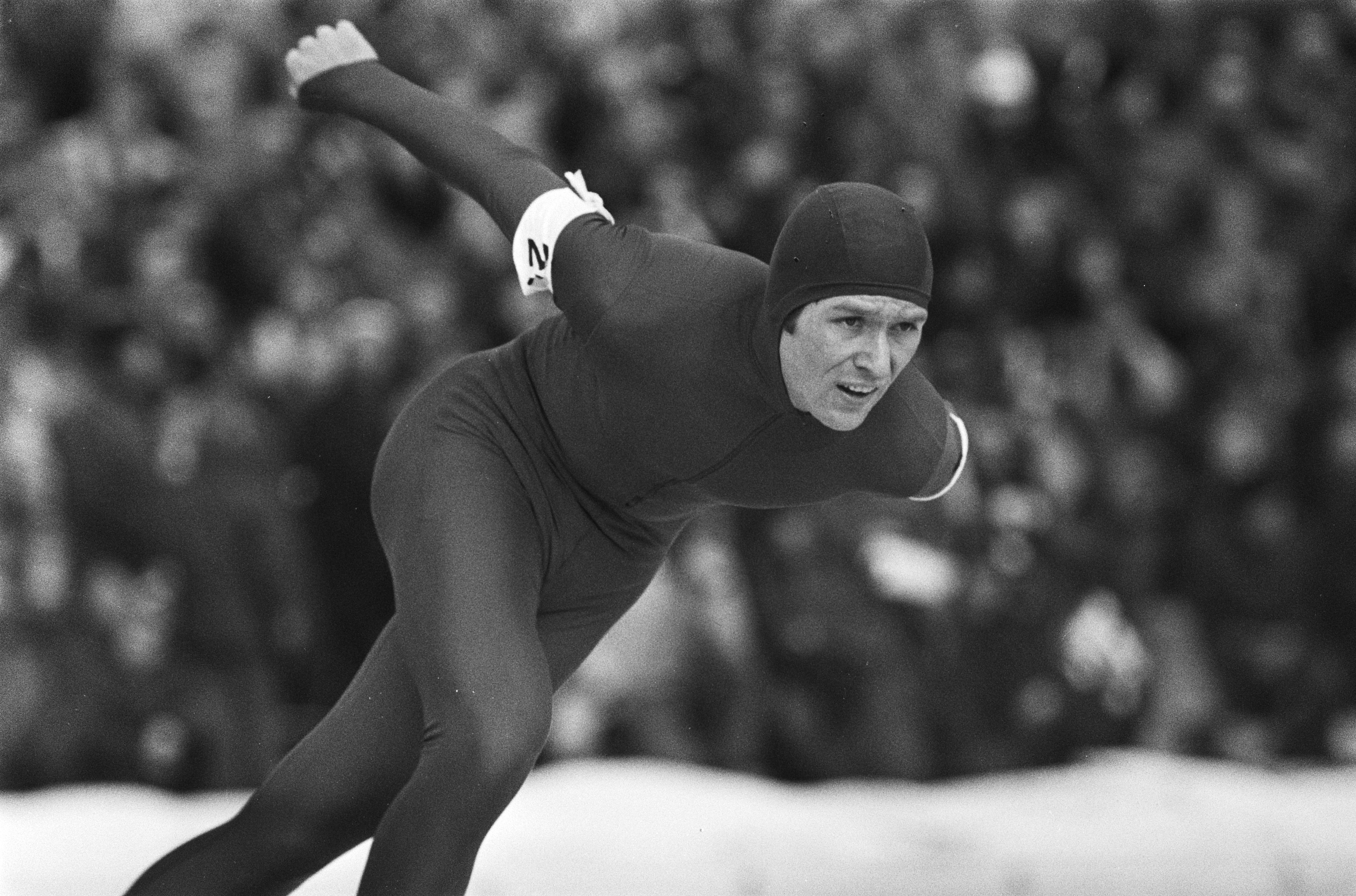
- Kay Arne Stenshjemmet in 1977

Personal information
- Nationality: Norwegian
- Born: Kay Arne Stenshjemmet; 9 August 1953 (age 72) Lillestrøm, Norway
- Height: 1.88 m (6 ft 2 in)
- Weight: 84 kg (185 lb)

Sport
- Country: Norway
- Sport: Speed skating
- Club: Sportsklubben Ceres (1965–1979); Rælingen Skøyteklubb (1979–1982)
- Turned pro: 1972
- Retired: 1981

Achievements and titles
- Personal best(s): 500 m: 38.2 (1981); 1000 m: 1:17.5 (1981); 1500 m: 1:56.18 (1981); 3000 m: 4:07.22 (1981); 5000 m: 6:56.9 (1977); 10 000 m: 14:57.30 (1980)
Medal record
Silver medal – second place	1980 Lake Placid	1,500 m
Silver medal – second place	1980 Lake Placid	5,000 m

Kay Arne Stenshjemmet (born 9 August 1953) is a former speed skater from Norway.

== Short biography ==
Together with Amund Sjøbrend, Sten Stensen, and Jan Egil Storholt, Kay Stenshjemmet was one of the legendary four S-es (which sounds like "four aces" in Norwegian), four Norwegian top skaters in the 1970s and early 1980s. Kay is now working for Romerikes Blad

During the 1976 European Allround Championships in Oslo, fellow Norwegian Sten Stensen (the defending European Champion), set a new world record on the 10,000 m, but Stenshjemmet still became European Champion by a tiny margin of only 0.005 points (equivalent to 0.10 seconds on the 10000 m).

At the end of the 1975–1976 season, the world record on the 5000 m was Piet Kleine's 7:02.38. On 19 March 1977, first Sergey Marchuk and then in the following pair Stenshjemmet were the first to skate the 5000 m below seven minutes, with 6:58.88 and 6:56.9, respectively. Stenshjemmet's world record would last for five years, until Aleksandr Baranov skated 6:54.44.

Stenshjemmet was European Allround Champion in 1976 and 1980. He was also Norwegian Allround Champion in 1976, 1977, 1978, and 1981, as well as Norwegian Sprint Champion in 1976. At the 1980 Winter Olympics in Lake Placid, Stenshjemmet won silver on the 1500 m and on the 5000 m, both behind Eric Heiden.

== Medals ==
An overview of medals won by Stenshjemmet at important championships he participated in, listing the years in which he won each:

Championships	Gold medal	Silver medal	Bronze medal
Winter Olympics	–	1980 (1500 m); 1980 (5000 m)	–
World Allround	–	1981	1979
World Sprint	–	–	–
European Allround	1976; 1980	1977; 1979	1981
Norwegian Allround	1976; 1977; 1978; 1981	1979	–
Norwegian Sprint	1976	1980	1977

== World record ==
During his career, Stenshjemmet skated one world record:

Discipline	Time	Date	Location
5000 m	6.56,9	19 March 1977	Medeo

Source: SpeedSkatingStats.com

== Personal records ==
To put these personal records in perspective, the WR column lists the official world records on the dates that Stenshjemmet skated his personal records.

Event	Result	Date	Venue	WR
500 m	38.2	31 March 1981	Harbin	36.91
1000 m	1:17.5	31 March 1981	Harbin	1:13.39
1500 m	1:56.18	11 January 1981	Davos	1:54.79
3000 m	4:07.22	16 January 1981	Davos	4:04.06
5000 m	6:56.9	19 March 1977	Medeo	7:02.38
10000 m	14:57.30	20 January 1980	Trondheim	14:34.33
Big combination	164.283	20 March 1977	Medeo	165.884

Note that Stenshjemmet's personal record on the big combination was not a world record because Jan Egil Storholt skated 163.221 at the same tournament.

Stenshjemmet has an Adelskalender score of 163.481 points. His highest ranking on the Adelskalender was a third place.
