= Amund Sjøbrend =

Norwegian speed skater (1952–2026)

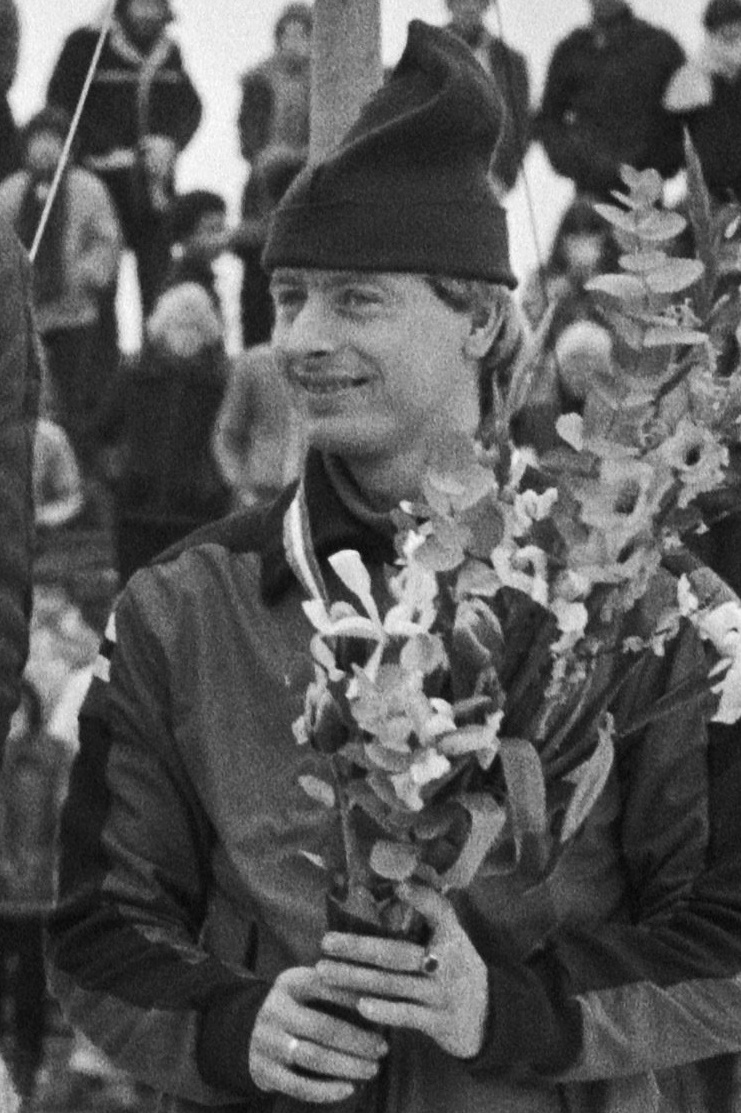
- Amund Sjøbrend in 1979

Personal information
- Nationality: Norwegian
- Born: Amund Martin Sjøbrend; 1 December 1952 Sør-Odal, Norway
- Died: 4 October 2026 (aged 73)
- Height: 1.80 m (5 ft 11 in)
- Weight: 77 kg (170 lb)

Sport
- Sport: Speed skating
- Club: Hamar IL, Hamar

Achievements and titles
- Personal bests: 500 m: 38.62 (1977); 1000 m: 1:19.4 (1981); 1500 m: 1:56.32 (1981); 3000 m: 4:08.22 (1981); 5000 m: 7:08.88 (1981); 10 000 m: 14:58.71 (1981)

Amund Martin Sjøbrend (1 December 1952 – 4 October 2026) was a Norwegian speed skater.

== Biography ==
Together with Sten Stensen, Kay Stenshjemmet, and Jan Egil Storholt, Sjøbrend was one of the legendary four S-es (which sounds like "four aces" in Norwegian), four Norwegian top skaters in the 1970s and early 1980s. His first international success came in 1974, when he won silver at the European Allround Championships. Sjøbrend participated at the 1976 Winter Olympics in Innsbruck, but had no success there. In 1977, he won bronze at the European Allround Championships.

Sjøbrend was more or less in the shadow of the other three of the four S-es until he had his best year in 1981. That year, he became both European Allround Champion and World Allround Champion. For his accomplishments, he received the Oscar Mathisen Award that same year.

Sjøbrend died on 4 October 2026, at the age of 73.

== Medals ==
An overview of medals won by Sjøbrend at important championships he participated in, listing the years in which he won each:

Championships	Gold medal	Silver medal	Bronze medal
Winter Olympics	–	–	–
World Allround	1981	–	–
European Allround	1981	1974	1977
Norwegian Allround	1975	1974; 1981	1976; 1979; 1980

== Personal records ==
To put these personal records in perspective, the WR column lists the official world records on the dates that Sjøbrend skated his personal records.

Event	Result	Date	Venue	WR
500 m	38.62	19 March 1977	Medeo	37.00
1,000 m	1:19.4	29 March 1981	Changchun	1:13.39
1,500 m	1:56.32	11 January 1981	Davos	1:54.79
3,000 m	4:08.22	16 January 1981	Davos	4:04.06
5,000 m	7:08.88	24 January 1981	Deventer	6:56.9
10,000 m	14:58.71	15 February 1981	Oslo	14:26.71
Big combination	166.664	20 March 1977	Medeo	165.884

Sjøbrend has an Adelskalender score of 165.216 points. His highest ranking on the Adelskalender was a twelfth place.

Awards
Preceded by (United States) Eric Heiden	Oscar Mathisen Award; 1981	Succeeded by (Sweden) Tomas Gustafson
