= Alan Luke =

British speed skater

Personal information
- Full name: Alan Francis Luke
- Nationality: British
- Born: 17 June 1959 (age 65); Amersham, England

Sport
- Sport: Speed skating

Alan Francis Luke (born 17 June 1959) is a British speed skater. He competed in two events at the 1980 Winter Olympics.
