= Craig Webster =

Canadian speed skater

Personal information
- Born: 23 November 1957 (age 67); Regina, Saskatchewan, Canada

Sport
- Sport: Speed skating

Craig Webster (born 23 November 1957) is a Canadian speed skater. He competed in three events at the 1980 Winter Olympics.
