= Sergey Berezin =

Soviet speed skater (born 1960)

Personal information
- Nationality: Soviet
- Born: 11 March 1960 (age 65); Nizhny Novgorod, Russian SFSR, Soviet Union

Sport
- Sport: Speed skating

Sergey Berezin (born 11 March 1960) is a Soviet speed skater. He competed at the 1980 Winter Olympics, the 1984 Winter Olympics and the 1988 Winter Olympics.
