= Eric Heiden =

American speed skater (born 1958)

- Heiden in 1979

Personal information
- Born: Eric Arthur Heiden; June 14, 1958 (age 68) Madison, Wisconsin, U.S.
- Education: Stanford University (BS, MD)
- Height: 6 ft 0 1/2 in (184 cm)
- Weight: 185 lb (84 kg)

Sport
- Country: United States
- Sport: Speed skating

Achievements and titles
- Personal bests: 500 m: 37.63 (1980); 1000 m: 1:13.60 (1980); 1500 m: 1:54.79 (1980); 3000 m: 4:06.47 (1980); 5000 m: 6:59.15 (1979); 10 000 m: 14:28.13 (1980)
Medal record
Men's speed skating
Representing the United States
Olympic Games
Gold medal – first place	1980 Lake Placid	500 m
Gold medal – first place	1980 Lake Placid	1000 m
Gold medal – first place	1980 Lake Placid	1500 m
Gold medal – first place	1980 Lake Placid	5000 m
Gold medal – first place	1980 Lake Placid	10000 m
World Allround Championships
Gold medal – first place	1977 Heerenveen	Allround
Gold medal – first place	1978 Gothenburg	Allround
Gold medal – first place	1979 Oslo	Allround
Silver medal – second place	1980 Heerenveen	Allround
World Sprint Championships
Gold medal – first place	1977 Alkmaar	Sprint
Gold medal – first place	1978 Lake Placid	Sprint
Gold medal – first place	1979 Inzell	Sprint
Gold medal – first place	1980 Milwaukee	Sprint

Eric Arthur Heiden (born June 14, 1958) is an American physician and a former long track speed skater, road cyclist and track cyclist. At the 1980 Winter Olympics, Heiden was the most successful athlete, setting four Olympic records and one world record, and winning an unprecedented five individual gold medals. Only two nations — the Soviet Union (10) and East Germany (9) — won more gold medals at the Lake Placid Olympics. In the 2026 Milano-Cortino Winter Games, Norwegian cross-country skier Johannes Høsflot Klæbo won six golds, though two were in team events. Heiden delivered the Athlete's Oath at those same 1980 Games. His coach was Dianne Holum.

Heiden is an icon in the speed skating community. His victories are significant, as few speed skaters (and athletes in general) have won competitions in both sprint and long-distance events. Heiden is the only athlete in the history of speed skating to have won all five events in a single Olympic tournament and the only one to have won a gold medal in all events. He is considered by some to be the best overall speed skater (short and long distances) in the sport's history. Heiden ranked No. 46 in ESPN's SportsCentury 50 Greatest Athletes of the 20th Century in 1999, the only speed skater to make the list. In 2000, a Dutch newspaper called him the greatest skater ever.

== Early life, education and family ==
Heiden was born in Madison, Wisconsin, on June 14, 1958. His father, Jack Heiden, was a longtime orthopedic surgeon in Madison. His sister, Beth Heiden, also became an accomplished cyclist, speed skater, and cross-country skier. In their hometown Shorewood Hills, Wisconsin (a suburb of Madison), Eric and his sister Beth were the driving forces behind the creation of the Heiden Haus, a small outpost where local children can warm up after skating or playing hockey on the ice rink (complete with underground clay platform). He graduated from Madison West High School in 1976.

After starting his undergraduate education at the University of Wisconsin–Madison, Heiden transferred to the University of California, San Diego and then to Stanford University in California, earning a B.S. degree in 1984 and an M.D. degree in 1991.

== Athletic career ==
=== Speed skating ===
Heiden won the World Junior Speed Skating Championships in 1977 and 1978. During his brief speed skating career, Heiden won three World Allround Championships and four World Sprint Championships, becoming the youngest athlete to do so. Three times he broke the world record in the 1000 metres, twice in the 3000 metres, and once each in the 1500 metres and 10000 metres. He also broke the points world record in both allround and the sprinting distances.

Heiden finished his speed skating career by finishing second behind Hilbert van der Duim at the 1980 World Allround Championships in Heerenveen. He stood at the top of the Adelskalender, a ranking system for long-track speed skating, for a record 1,495 days, and he won the Oscar Mathisen Award four times in a row from 1977 until 1980. As of 2026, he still is the only skater who has won the award four times.

He received the 1980 James E. Sullivan Award as the top amateur athlete in the United States. In 1983, he was inducted into the United States Olympic Hall of Fame.

Heiden was elected to the Wisconsin Athletic Hall of Fame in 1990.

==== World records ====
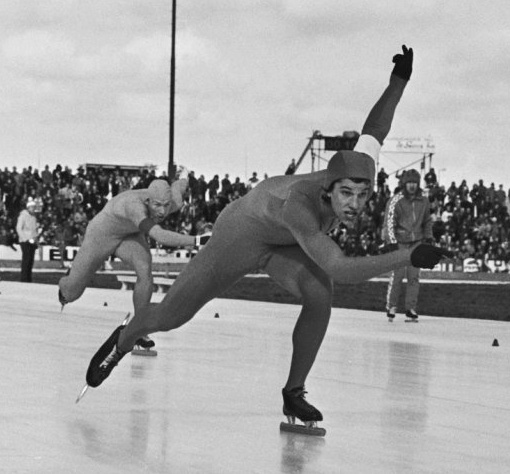
Heiden in 1977

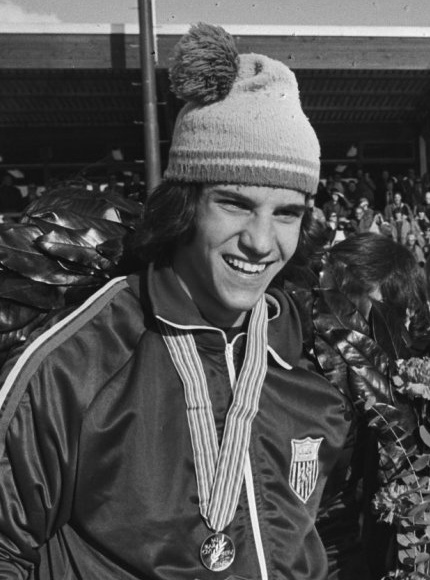
Heiden in 1977

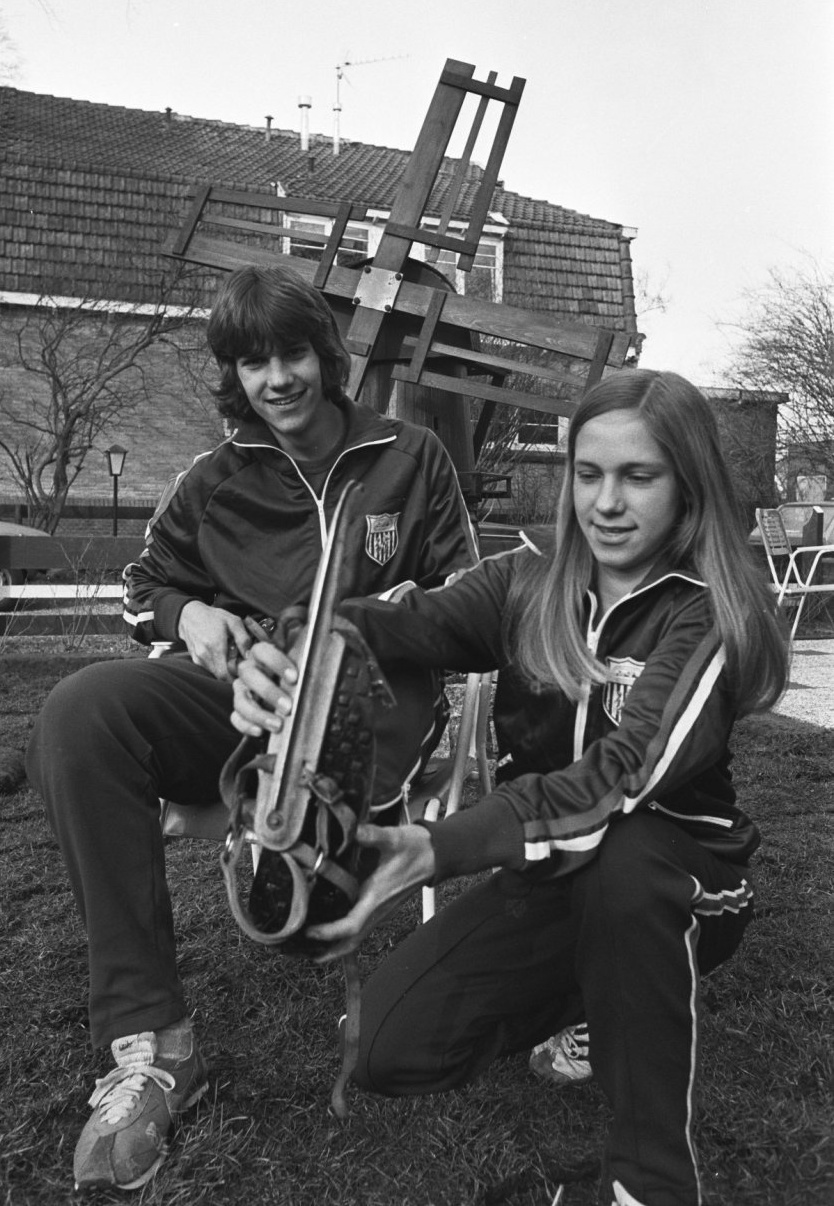
Eric and Beth Heiden in 1977 in Alkmaar, the Netherlands

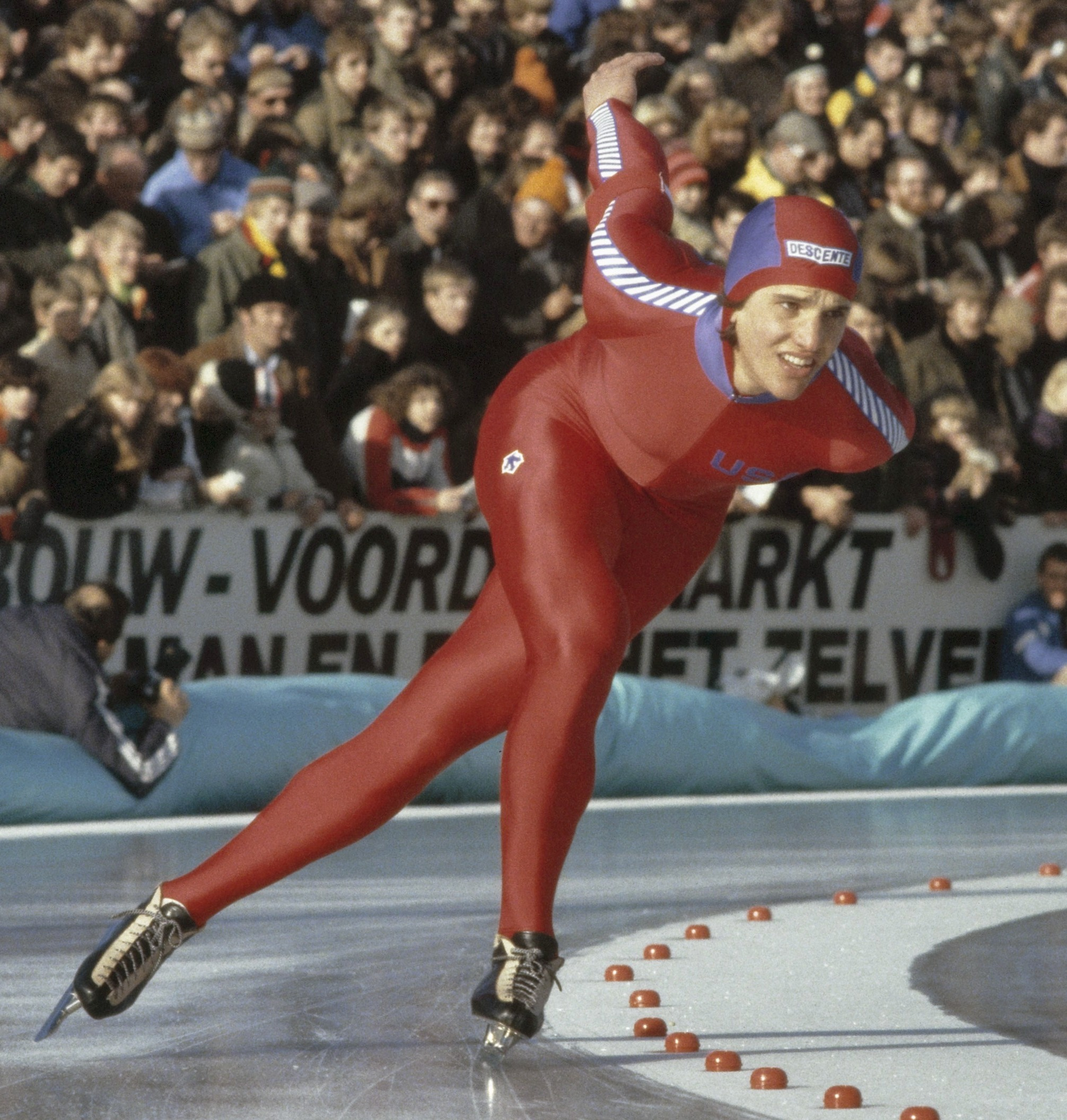
Heiden in 1980

Over the course of Heiden's career he skated 15 world records:

Discipline	Time	Date	Location
1500 m junior	2:02.75	January 18, 1976	Madonna di Campiglio
5000 m junior	7:30.23	February 20, 1977	Inzell
1500 m junior	1:59.46	February 20, 1977	Inzell
Allround junior	168.716	February 19–20, 1977	Inzell
3000 m junior	4:16.2	February 4, 1977	Montreal
Allround junior	166.584	February 4–5, 1977	Montreal
5000 m junior	7:23.54	February 5, 1978	Montreal
3000 m	4:07.01	March 2, 1978	Inzell
1000 m	1:14.99	March 12, 1978	Savalen
Big combination	162.973	February 11, 1979	Oslo
1000 m	1:14.99	February 17, 1979	Inzell
3000 m	4:06.91	March 18, 1979	Savalen
1000 m	1:13.60	January 13, 1980	Davos
Sprint combination	150.250	January 13, 1980	Davos
1500 m	1:54.79	January 19, 1980	Davos
10000 m	14:28.13	February 23, 1980	Lake Placid

=== Cycling ===
After his speed-skating career Heiden became a professional cyclist.

==== Track cycling ====
As a track cyclist Heiden competed at the 1981 UCI Track Cycling World Championships in Brno, but was not successful. He finished 19th and last in the men's individual pursuit event.

==== Road bicycle racing ====
Heiden became a professional racing cyclist. He was one of the first cross-over athletes, becoming a founding member of the 7-Eleven Cycling Team. Together with his former speed skating coach (and ex-bike racer), Jim Ochowicz, he conceived of the idea of a European-style sponsored team for North American riders Heiden won a few American professional races. He finished the 1985 Giro d'Italia and took part in the 1986 Tour de France, although he did not complete the race, crashing on a downhill stretch and suffering a concussion five days from the finish.

Heiden is believed to have recorded one of the fastest times at 14:10 (1986 or 1987) on one of the local benchmark climbs in Woodside, California: Old La Honda Road. In 1985, Heiden won the first U.S. Professional Cycling Championship, becoming the American road race champion.

In 1999, Heiden was inducted into the United States Bicycling Hall of Fame.

== Medical career ==
Heiden completed medical school at Stanford University in 1991, and orthopedic residency training at University of California, Davis, in 1996, then spent a year at a sports medicine clinic in Birmingham, Alabama. He returned to California to practice as an orthopedic surgeon in Sacramento. At that time, he also served as team physician for the NBA's Sacramento Kings and the Sacramento Monarchs of the WNBA. In 2002, 2006, 2010 and 2014 he was team physician for the U.S. Olympic speed skating team. He opened a sports medicine-based practice at The Orthopedic Specialty Hospital (TOSH) in Murray, Utah, and expanded Heiden Orthopaedics with an additional office in Park City, Utah.

In 2008, Heiden and Massimo Testa published Faster, Better, Stronger, a book about exercise science and exercise programs.

In 2009, Heiden was one of the team of doctors assisting U.S. speed skater J.R. Celski as the latter recovered from a very bad speed skating crash during the U.S. Olympic trials. Despite cutting himself to the bone and requiring 60 stitches, Celski was able to recover in time for the 2010 Winter Olympics in Vancouver, where he won the bronze medal in both men's 1500 m and 5000 m relay.

== Personal life ==
Heiden met fellow medical student Karen Drews while the two were studying at Stanford, and they married in 1995. Karen is a hand surgeon. They have a daughter, Zoe, born in 2001.

Heiden was offered many sponsorship opportunities after his record-setting performance in the 1980 Winter Olympics, but turned down most of them, saying he had enough money, and preferred the anonymity.

A number of American former gold medal winners, including Heiden, were asked to participate in the ceremonies for the 2002 Winter Olympics held in Salt Lake City, Utah, but Heiden declined after he was passed over for the honor of lighting the Olympic torch. The 1980 U.S. Hockey Team, which won the gold medal at the 1980 games, was given the honor instead. Heiden said in 2009: "I was probably just too stubborn. I figured if they don't appreciate what I did as a skater, if they don't appreciate now what I am doing as a human being, I'd just as soon hang out with my buddies and watch it. I did not mean to slight the Olympic hockey team in any way."

== See also ==
- List of multiple Olympic gold medalists at a single Games
- List of Olympic medalist families

Awards and achievements
Preceded by (Norway) Sten Stensen	Oscar Mathisen Award; 1977–1980	Succeeded by (Norway) Amund Sjøbrend
Preceded by (United Kingdom) Sebastian Coe	United Press International; Athlete of the Year; 1980	Succeeded by (United Kingdom) Sebastian Coe
Preceded by (United States) Kurt Thomas	James E. Sullivan Award; 1980	Succeeded by (United States) Carl Lewis
