= Samalog =

Speed skating scoring system

Samalog (or samalogue in UK spelling; sometimes sammenlagt in both Norwegian and Danish: "put together", "total sum") is a scoring system in speed skating. It is used in allround tournaments to convert results at various distances into points in order to determine an overall champion. All times are measured in seconds and then converted to points, using the average times on 500 meter units; thus the number of points for a 1,000 meters race is the time in seconds divided by two (so the average time for each of the two 500 meter "units" in a 1,000 meters race); for the 1,500 meters, the time in seconds is divided by three, and so on. Points are calculated to three decimal places and truncation is applied; the numbers are not rounded. All points are added up; the lower the score the better.

The samalog method is used in national and international allround speed skating events, with the most prominent being the European Championships and the World Allround Championships. The samalog method is also used in two-day sprint championships, such as the World Sprint Championship, where each of the two sprint distances (the 500 meters and the 1,000 meters) is skated twice.

The ranking of samalog scores based on a skater's personal records in official championships over the skater's entire career is called the Adelskalender.

Although any combination of any number of events is possible, the following combinations (all consisting of four events) are commonly used or have been commonly used in the past:

- Sprint combination: 500 m, 1000 m, 500 m, 1000 m — this format is used at the World Sprint Championships (for both men and women).
- Old combination: 500 m, 1000 m, 3000 m, 5000 m — this format was used at the World Allround Championships for women up to 1955.
- Mini combination: 500 m, 1000 m, 1500 m, 3000 m — this format was used at the World Allround Championships for women in the years 1956–1982.
- Small combination: 500 m, 1500 m, 3000 m, 5000 m — this format is currently used at the World Allround Championships for women (since 1983).
- Big combination: 500 m, 1500 m, 5000 m, 10000 m — this format is used at the World Allround Championships for men.

== Examples ==
The points for the current leaders of the Adelskalender (as of March 2019) ranking are calculated as follows:

Women: Cindy Klassen

Distance	Time	Seconds	Divided by	Points
500m	37.51	37.51	1	37.510
1500m	1:51.79	111.79	3	37.263
3000m	3:53.34	233.34	6	38.890
5000m	6:48.97	408.97	10	40.897
Total				154.560

Men: Patrick Roest

Distance	Time	Seconds	Divided by	Points
500m	35.74	35.74	1	35.740
1500m	1:42.56	102.56	3	34.187
5000m	6:03.70	363.70	10	36.370
10000m	12:47.89	767.89	20	38.395
Total				144.690
