= European Speed Skating Championships =

Annual series of speed skating events

The European Speed Skating Championships are a series of long track speed skating events held annually to determine the best speed skaters of Europe.

== History ==
The International Skating Union has organised the European Championships for Men since 1893 (unofficial Championships were held in the years 1891–1892) and the European Championships for Women since 1970. Since 1990, the men's and women's European Championships have been held at the same time and venue.

Starting in 2017, in odd years, the men's and women's European Sprint Speed Skating Championships are also held at the same time and venue. Starting in 2018, in even years, the men's and women's single distance championships are held instead of Allround and Sprint championships.

== Medal winners ==
=== Allround and Sprint Championships (1891–2025) ===
Rank	Nation	Gold	Silver	Bronze	Total
1	Netherlands	59	54	50	163
2	Norway	39	41	39	119
3	Germany	16	13	6	35
4	Soviet Union	14	11	16	41
5	Sweden	10	3	8	21
6	East Germany	8	6	5	19
7	Finland	7	9	6	22
8	Czech Republic	6	3	4	13
9	Austria	5	6	5	16
10	Russia	5	4	10	19
11	Italy	1	4	3	8
12	Latvia	1	0	0	1
13	Belgium	0	2	2	4
14	France	0	1	1	2
15	Estonia	0	0	1	1
15	Hungary	0	0	1	1
Totals (16 entries)		171	157	157	485

Unofficial European Championships of 1891, 1892 and 1946 (not recognized by the ISU) included

=== Single Distance Championships (2018–2026) ===
Rank	Nation	Gold	Silver	Bronze	Total
1	Netherlands	36	28	19	83
2	Russia	10	13	14	37
3	Poland	9	4	6	19
4	Norway	5	5	12	22
5	Belgium	4	3	1	8
6	Italy	3	7	7	17
7	Austria	1	3	3	7
8	Czech Republic	1	1	1	3
9	Denmark	1	0	0	1
10	Finland	0	2	0	2
11	Germany	0	1	3	4
12	Switzerland	0	1	2	3
13	Belarus	0	1	1	2
13	Estonia	0	1	1	2
Totals (14 entries)		70	70	70	210

=== Combined all-time medal count (1891–2026) ===
Rank	Nation	Gold	Silver	Bronze	Total
1	Netherlands	95	82	69	246
2	Norway	44	46	51	141
3	Germany	16	14	9	39
4	Russia	15	17	24	56
5	Soviet Union	14	11	16	41
6	Sweden	10	3	8	21
7	Poland	9	4	6	19
8	East Germany	8	6	5	19
9	Finland	7	11	6	24
10	Czech Republic	7	4	5	16
11	Austria	6	9	8	23
12	Italy	4	11	10	25
13	Belgium	4	5	3	12
14	Denmark	1	0	0	1
14	Latvia	1	0	0	1
16	Estonia	0	1	2	3
16	Switzerland	0	1	2	3
18	Belarus	0	1	1	2
18	France	0	1	1	2
20	Hungary	0	0	1	1
Totals (20 entries)		241	227	227	695

Unofficial European Championships of 1891, 1892 and 1946 (not recognized by the ISU) included

== Multiple medalists ==
Boldface denotes active skaters and highest medal count among all skaters (including these who not included in these tables) per type.

=== Allround and Sprint Championships ===
Rank	Skater	Country	Gender	From	To	Gold	Silver	Bronze	Total
1	Sven Kramer	Netherlands	M	2005	2019	**10**	1	–	11
2	Gunda Niemann-Stirnemann (Kleemann)	East Germany; Germany	F	1988	2001	8	3	–	11
3	Rintje Ritsma	Netherlands	M	1992	2003	6	2	2	10
4	Ireen Wüst	Netherlands	F	2006	2017	5	4	2	11
5	Martina Sáblíková	Czech Republic	F	2007	2021	5	3	4	**12**
6	Anni Friesinger	Germany	F	1998	2005	5	1	–	6
7	Andrea Ehrig (Schöne)	East Germany	F	1983	1988	5	–	–	5
8	Clas Thunberg	Finland	M	1922	1932	4	4	–	8
9	Ivar Ballangrud	Norway	M	1927	1938	4	–	2	6
9	**Antoinette Rijpma-de Jong**	Netherlands	F	2016	2025	4	–	2	6

=== All events ===
Rank	Skater	Country	Gender	From	To	Gold	Silver	Bronze	Total
1	Sven Kramer	Netherlands	M	2005	2022	**12**	2	–	14
2	**Antoinette Rijpma-de Jong**	Netherlands	F	2016	2025	9	2	2	13
3	Ireen Wüst	Netherlands	F	2006	2022	8	**6**	2	**16**
4	Gunda Niemann-Stirnemann (Kleemann)	East Germany; Germany	F	1988	2001	8	3	–	11
5	**Patrick Roest**	Netherlands	M	2019	2024	7	1	2	10
6	Rintje Ritsma	Netherlands	M	1992	2003	6	2	2	10
7	**Jutta Leerdam**	Netherlands	F	2020	2025	6	1	–	7
8	Martina Sáblíková	Czech Republic	F	2007	2021	5	3	4	12
9	Irene Schouten	Netherlands	F	2020	2024	5	3	–	8
10	Anni Friesinger	Germany	F	1998	2005	5	1	–	6
