= Adelskalender (skating) =

Speed skating (long track) ranking based on personal bests

The Adelskalender in skating is a ranking for long track speed skating based on skaters' all-time personal records for certain distances. As in samalog competitions, the skater's time (measured in seconds) for each distance is divided in 500 metre averages, truncated (not rounded) to 3 decimal places, and the results are then added up – the lower the sum, the better. The samalog system was introduced in 1928 in Norway, replacing ranking points in the traditional 4 distance championships, and can also be used to reconstruct scores based on personal records that were set before the samalog system was invented.

The classical Adelskalender consists of the Allround Championships distances:

- Men: 500 m - 1500 m - 5000 m - 10,000 m
- Women: 500 m - 1500 m - 3000 m - 5000 m

Similar rankings in many other combinations are maintained by enthusiasts and available on the Internet.

== Calculation ==
As an example, the points for the current leader in the men's Adelskalendern ranking Jordan Stolz are calculated as follows:

Distance	Time	Seconds	Divided by	Points
500m	33.69	33.69	1	33.690
1500m	1:40.48	100.48	3	33.493
5000m	6:14.76	374.76	10	37.476
10000m	13:04.67	784.67	20	39.234
Total				143.897

== Caveats ==
The Adelskalender score is calculated over a skater's entire career and not for a single tournament. Theoretically, this would make it possible for a skater to lead the Adelskalender without ever having set a 4 distance championships samalog record, or even having won - or participated in - such a tournament.

Speed skating records have improved dramatically over the years due to a combination of larger participation, introduction of professionalism, improvements in training and selection, and, especially, technical developments, distorting the comparative accomplishments of skaters over time. For comparison, the ranking leader on 1 January 1900 (Jaap Eden) had a score of 202.226, "averaging" 35.6 km/h. In 1925 Oscar Mathisen led with 192.860 (37.3 km/h), in 1950 Åke Seyffarth led with 188.678 (38.2 km/h), in 1975 Ard Schenk led with 166.241 (43.3 km/h), and in 2000 Rintje Ritsma led with 150.720 (47.8 km/h).

Among major technical developments were the introduction of artificial (refrigerated) 400 m ovals, the first opening in Gothenburg in 1958, aerodynamics suits in 1976 (by Franz Krienbühl), indoor, climate-controlled ovals in 1986, and the clap skate in 1996. Also, over time, more high altitude skating rinks have been built; the lower air pressure at higher altitude greatly benefits the skater's speed -the rule of thumb is 0.1 points at each distance for every 100 m of increased altitude- and world records generally are set at high altitude.

Even the ranking points of concurrent skaters can be strongly affected by the opportunity skaters have to train and compete on fast rinks. For example, before the 1960s, skaters were dependent on long periods of frost, less common at more southerly latitudes. The effect of access to high altitude rinks was especially notable from 1973 to 1986, when most world records were set at Medeo in Kazakhstan, a rink at 1,691 m that also enjoyed an unusual all-around tailwind, but was rarely accessible to non-Soviet skaters. In 1977–78, the Adelskalender top 10 consisted almost entirely of times set at Medeo, while several skaters in the top 10 never reached the podium at international meets. Currently, the two fastest speed skating rinks are, by a long way, the high altitude covered ovals at Calgary and Salt Lake City, both in North America. Indeed, after the 2014–15 season, 65 of the last 67 new world distance records and the 264 best times ever on the men's 1000 m were recorded at one of these two venues.

== Current Adelskalenders ==
=== Men ===
This table is correct as of 24 January 2026. Times in bold are the current world records at that distance. For comparison: the world record big combination (similar to the men's Adelskalender samalog, only for times in one weekend) is 144.740, by Jordan Stolz on 9–10 March 2024.

Pos	Name	Country	500 m	1500 m	5000 m	10000 m	Samalog
1	Jordan Stolz	United States	33.69	1:40.48	6:14.76	13:04.76	143.897
2	Patrick Roest	Netherlands	35.74	1:42.56	6:02.98	12:35.20	143.984
3	Shani Davis	United States	34.78	1:41.04	6:10.49	13:05.94	144.806
4	Sander Eitrem	Norway	36.79	1:43.23	**5:58.52**	12:38.04	144.954
5	Sven Kramer	Netherlands	36.17	1:43.54	6:03.32	12:38.89	144.959
6	Chad Hedrick	United States	35.52	1:42.14	6:09.68	12:55.11	145.289
7	Peder Kongshaug	Norway	35.45	1:41.34	6:05.89	13:12.15	145.426
8	Sverre Lunde Pedersen	Norway	35.85	1:42.39	6:07.16	12:56.91	145.541
9	Vladimir Semirunniy	Poland	36.95	1:43.41	6:07.81	12:28.05	145.603
10	Bart Swings	Belgium	36.36	1:42.48	6:08.76	12:44.75	145.633

=== Women ===
This table is correct as of 15 February 2026. Times in bold are the current world records at that distance. For comparison: the world record small combination (similar to the women's Adelskalender samalog, only for times in one weekend) is 154.580, by Cindy Klassen on 18/19 Mar 2006.

Pos	Name	Country	500 m	1500 m	3000 m	5000 m	Samalog
1	Cindy Klassen	Canada	37.51	1:51.79	3:53.34	6:48.97	154.560
2	Miho Takagi	Japan	37.12	**1:49.83**	3:55.45	7:00.08	154.979
3	Joy Beune	Netherlands	38.69	1:51.05	3:53.69	6:45.76	155.230
4	Irene Schouten	Netherlands	39.24	1:52.12	3:52.89	6:41.25	155.553
5	Martina Sáblíková	Czech Republic	39.23	1:53.44	**3:52.02**	6:41.18	155.831
6	Marijke Groenewoud	Netherlands	38.57	1:53.05	3:54.73	6:44.59	155.833
7	Francesca Lollobrigida	Italy	39.06	1:52.23	3:54.28	6:46.17	156.134
8	Ivanie Blondin	Canada	38.51	1:51.76	3:56.88	6:48.98	156.141
9	Antoinette Rijpma-de Jong	Netherlands	38.22	1:51.71	3:55.19	6:56.26	156.280
10	Ireen Wüst	Netherlands	38.44	1:50.70	3:58.01	6:54.28	156.436
