= Speed skating at the 1988 Winter Olympics – Men's 10,000 metres =

Speed skating at the Olympics

Men's 10,000 metres at the XV Olympic Winter Games
- Pictogram for speed skating
- Venue: Olympic Oval
- Dates: 21 February 1988
- Competitors: 32 from 19 nations
- Winning time: 13:48.20 WR

Medalists
1st place, gold medalist(s)		Tomas Gustafson; Sweden
2nd place, silver medalist(s)		Michael Hadschieff; Austria
3rd place, bronze medalist(s)		Leo Visser; Netherlands

The men's 10,000 metres in speed skating at the 1988 Winter Olympics took place on 21 February, at the Olympic Oval. 32 competitors from 19 nations participated in the event.

== Medalists ==
Gold	Silver	Bronze
Tomas Gustafson; Sweden	Michael Hadschieff; Austria	Leo Visser; Netherlands

== Records ==
Prior to this competition, the existing world and Olympic records were as follows:

World record	Geir Karlstad (NOR)	13:48.51	Calgary, Canada	6 December 1987
Olympic record	Eric Heiden (USA)	14:28.13	Lake Placid, United States	23 February 1980

The following new Olympic and World records were set during the competition:

Date	Pair	Athlete	Country	Time	OR	WR
21 February	Pair 1	Yury Klyuyev	Soviet Union	14:09.68	OR	
21 February	Pair 2	Gerard Kemkers	Netherlands	14:08.34	OR	
21 February	Pair 4	Leo Visser	Netherlands	14:00.55	OR	
21 February	Pair 5	Michael Hadschieff	Austria	13:56.11	OR	
21 February	Pair 9	Tomas Gustafson	Sweden	13:48.20	OR	WR

== Results ==
Rank	Pair	Lane	Athlete	Country	Time	Time Behind	Notes
1st place, gold medalist(s)	9	o	Tomas Gustafson	Sweden	13:48.20	–	(WR)
2nd place, silver medalist(s)	5	i	Michael Hadschieff	Austria	13:56.11	+7.91	
3rd place, bronze medalist(s)	4	i	Leo Visser	Netherlands	14:00.55	+12.35	
4	10	o	Eric Flaim	United States	14:05.57	+17.37	
5	2	o	Gerard Kemkers	Netherlands	14.08,34 f	+20.14	
6	1	o	Yury Klyuyev	Soviet Union	14:09.68	+21.48	
7	16	i	Roberto Sighel	Italy	14:13.60	+25.40	
8	9	i	Roland Freier	East Germany	14:19.16	+30.98	
9	6	o	Sergey Berezin	Soviet Union	14:20.48	+32.28	
10	3	o	Ben Lamarche	Canada	14:21.39	+33.19	
11	5	o	Herbert Dijkstra	Netherlands	14:22.53	+34.33	
12	11	i	Joakim Karlberg	Sweden	14:22.94	+34.74	
13	14	o	Bruno Milesi	Italy	14:23.84	+35.64	
14	7	i	Dave Silk	United States	14:25.56	+37.36	
15	7	o	Pertti Niittylä	Finland	14:26.57	+38.37	
16	15	i	Jiří Kyncl	Czechoslovakia	14:27.32	+39.12	
17	12	i	Timo Järvinen	Finland	14:27.69	+39.49	
18	2	i	Aleksandr Mozin	Soviet Union	14:28.91	+40.71	
19	3	i	Christian Eminger	Austria	14:30.21	+42.01	
20	14	i	Gordon Goplen	Canada	14:31.18	+42.98	
21	4	o	Frode Syvertsen	Norway	14:32.08	+43.88	
22	13	o	Kim Gwan-gyu	South Korea	14:34.65	+46.45	
23	11	o	Hans van Helden	France	14:34.84	+46.64	
24	8	o	Toru Aoyanagi	Japan	14:34.87	+46.67	
25	10	i	Jeff Klaiber	United States	14:38.60	+50.40	
26	16	o	Colin Coates	Australia	14:41.88	+53.68	
27	1	i	Hansjörg Baltes	West Germany	14:45.41	+57.21	
28	8	i	Yoshiyuki Shimizu	Japan	14:47.21	+59.01	
29	13	i	Lu Shuhai	China	14:49.52	+1:01.32	
30	15	o	Julian Green	Great Britain	14:59.53	+1:11.33	
–	6	i	Geir Karlstad	Norway	dnf, f	–	
–	12	o	Song Yong-hun	North Korea	dsq [14:33,41]	–	
