= 1985 World Allround Speed Skating Championships =

International speed skating competition

1985 World Allround Speed Skating Championships for Men
- Venue: Hamar stadion, Hamar, Norway
- Dates: 16–17 February
- Competitors: 33 skaters from 14 nations

Medalist men
1st place, gold medalist(s)		Hein Vergeer	NED
2nd place, silver medalist(s)		Oleg Bozhev	SOV
3rd place, bronze medalist(s)		Hilbert van der Duim	NED

The World Allround Speed Skating Championships for Men took place on 16 and 17 February 1985 in Hamar at the Hamar stadion ice rink.

The title holder was Oleg Bozhev from the USSR.

== Classification ==
Rank	Skater	Country	Points Samalog	500m	5000m	1500m	10,000m
1st place, gold medalist(s)	Hein Vergeer	Netherlands	166.931	38.94 (6)	7:05.59 (gold)	1:59.37 (2)	15:12.84 (8)
2nd place, silver medalist(s)	Oleg Bozhev	Soviet Union	167.679	38.49 (2)	7:17.61 (12)	1:59.16 (gold)	15:14.17 (11)
3rd place, bronze medalist(s)	Hilbert van der Duim	Netherlands	167.718	38.87 (4)	7:08.74 (2)	2:01.30 (11)	15:10.82 (6)
4	Frits Schalij	Netherlands	168.323	39.43 (11)	7:12.41 (6)	2:00.98 (10)	15:06.53 (4)
5	Michael Hadschieff	Austria	168.378	39.25 (9)	7:14.50 (9)	2:00.45 (7)	15:10.56 (5)
6	Dave Silk	United States	168.466	40.01 (19)	7:11.65 (5)	2:00.79 (9)	15:00.56 (2)
7	Geir Karlstad	Norway	168.840	40.67 (28)	7:10.30 (3)	2:02.14 (16)	14:48.54 (gold)
8	Rolf Falk-Larssen	Norway	168.855	38.91 (5)	7:13.67 (8)	2:00.72 (8)	15:26.77 (14)
9	Christian Eminger	Austria	169.214	40.67 (28)	7:11.59 (4)	2:00.42 (6)	15:04.91 (3)
10	Emiel Hopman	Netherlands	170.166	40.59 (25)	7:13.58 (7)	2:01.80 (13)	15:12.37 (7)
11	Tom Erik Oxholm	Norway	170.180	39.91 (17)	7:16.78 (11)	2:01.53 (12)	15:21.64 (13)
12	Pertti Niittylä	Finland	170.265	39.96 (18)	7:19.09 (13)	2:02.13 (15)	15:13.73 (9)
13	Werner Jäger	Austria	171.094	40.41 (22)	7:19.67 (16)	2:02.04 (14)	15:20.74 (12)
14	Henry Nilsen	Norway	172.347	41.17 (31)	7:19.50 (14)	2:04.60 (26)	15:13.89 (10)
15	Hansjörg Baltes	West Germany	173.225	40.59 (25)	7:19.65 (15)	2:02.56 (18)	15:56.34 (16)
16	Viktor Shasherin	Soviet Union	179.378	38.82 (3)	7:15.47 (10)	2:32.00 * (33)	15:26.91 (15)
NC17	Gaétan Boucher	Canada	123.279	38.00 (gold)	7:34.63 (28)	1:59.45 (3)	–
NC18	Tomas Gustafson	Sweden	123.523	39.30 (10)	7:21.30 (18)	2:00.28 (5)	–
NC19	André Hoffmann	East Germany	123.687	39.06 (7)	7:25.84 (23)	2:00.13 (4)	–
NC20	Uwe Sauerteig	East Germany	125.065	40.05 (20)	7:20.45 (17)	2:02.91 (19)	–
NC21	Konstantin Korotkov	Soviet Union	125.301	40.32 (21)	7:22.28 (20)	2:02.26 (17)	–
NC22	Igor Malkov	Soviet Union	125.493	39.70 (14)	7:23.03 (21)	2:04.47 (25)	–
NC23	Joakim Karlberg	Sweden	125.980	39.84 (16)	7:30.07 (25)	2:03.40 (20)	–
NC24	Claes Bengtsson	Sweden	126.722	39.80 (15)	7:35.72 (29)	2:04.05 (21)	–
NC25	Toshiaki Imamura	Japan	126.781	40.45 (23)	7:29.31 (24)	2:04.20 (23)	–
NC26	Bae Ki-tae	South Korea	126.920	39.51 (12)	7:39.54 (32)	2:04.37 (24)	–
NC27	Hans van Helden	France	127.059	40.82 (30)	7:25.83 (22)	2:04.97 (27)	–
NC28	Marc Vernier	France	127.852	39.52 (13)	7:49.49 (33)	2:04.15 (22)	–
NC29	Nobuo Takehara	Japan	127.970	40.49 (24)	7:32.54 (26)	2:06.68 (30)	–
NC30	Jeff Klaiber	United States	128.218	40.61 (27)	7:36.65 (30)	2:05.83 (29)	–
NC31	Bruno Milesi	Italy	130.232	41.99 (32)	7:34.62 (27)	2:08.34 (31)	–
NC32	Mark Mitchell	United States	130.479	39.24 (8)	7:21.69 (19)	2:21.21* (32)	–
NC33	Urpo Pikkupeura	Finland	137.093	49.37* (33)	7:39.33 (31)	2:05.37 (28)	–

* = Fall

== Attribution ==
In Dutch
