= 1987 World Allround Speed Skating Championships =

International speed skating competition

1987 World Allround Speed Skating Championships for Men
- Venue: Thialf, Heerenveen, Netherlands
- Dates: 14–15 February
- Competitors: 35 skaters from 18 nations

Medalist men
1st place, gold medalist(s)		Nikolay Gulyayev	SOV
2nd place, silver medalist(s)		Oleg Bozhev	SOV
3rd place, bronze medalist(s)		Michael Hadschieff	AUT

The World Allround Speed Skating Championships for Men took place on 14 and 15 February 1987 in Heerenveen at the Thialf ice rink. This was the first international skating tournament to be held in an indoor stadium with the result that 9 world records and 93 personal records were set.

Title holder was the Netherlander Hein Vergeer.

== Classification ==
Rank	Skater	Country	Points Samalog	500m	5000m	1500m	10,000m
1st place, gold medalist(s)	Nikolay Gulyayev	Soviet Union	159.356 WR	37.24 (2)	6:51.28 (2)	1:52.70 WR (gold)	14:28.45 (7)
2nd place, silver medalist(s)	Oleg Bozhev	Soviet Union	160.558	37.74 (4)	6:56.73 (8)	1:53.52 (3)	14:26.11 (6)
3rd place, bronze medalist(s)	Michael Hadschieff	Austria	160.567	38.34 (10)	6:53.78 (6)	1:54.65 (5)	14:12.66 (3)
4	Leo Visser	Netherlands	160.808	38.66 (16)	6:47.01 WR (gold)	1:56.60 (15)	14:11.63 (2)
5	Gerard Kemkers	Netherlands	161.545	38.57 (14)	6:52.75 (4)	1:56.83 (17)	14:15.14 (4)
6	Viktor Shasherin	Soviet Union	161.707	38.18 (7)	6:57.78 (9)	1:53.10 (2)	14:40.98 (13)
7	Rolf Falk-Larssen	Norway	162.129	38.24 (8)	6:53.20 (5)	1:55.51 (7)	14:39.99 (11)
8	Christian Eminger	Austria	162.406	39.26 (21)	6:53.85 (7)	1:56.07 (13)	14:21.42 (5)
9	Benoît Lamarche	Canada	162.730	38.63 (15)	6:59.28 (11)	1:55.60 (10)	14:32.79 (8)
10	Hein Vergeer	Netherlands	162.779	37.79 (6)	7:02.27 (18)	1:55.46 (6)	14:45.52 (14)
11	Geir Karlstad	Norway	163.050	40.05 (29)	6:52.18 (3)	1:58.76 (27)	14:03.92 WR (gold)
12	Pertti Niittylä	Finland	163.981	39.21 (20)	6:59.86 (13)	1:56.96 (18)	14:35.98 (9)
13	Roland Freier	East Germany	164.926	39.35 (23)	7:01.65 (15)	1:58.14 (24)	14:40.62 (12)
14	Henry Kraaijenbos	Netherlands	165.022	40.07 (30)	6:58.17 (10)	1:57.96 (23)	14:36.30 (10)
15	Hansjörg Baltes	West Germany	165.873	40.24 (31)	6:59.50 (12)	1:57.85 (22)	14:48.01 (15)
NC	Toru Aoyanagi	Japan	–	37.55 (3)	7:01.44 (14)	1:54.45 (4)	DQ
NC17	Eric Flaim	United States	118.549	37.75 (5)	7:02.96 (20)	1:55.51 (7)	–
NC18	Peter Adeberg	East Germany	119.332	38.26 (9)	7:04.22 (21)	1:55.95 (12)	–
NC19	Dave Silk	United States	119.469	38.48 (11)	7:01.96 (17)	1:56.38 (14)	–
NC20	Bae Ki-tae	South Korea	119.495	37.04 (gold)	7:19.42 (34)	1:55.54 (9)	–
NC21	Bjørn Arne Nyland	Norway	119.892	38.53 (12)	7:04.39 (23)	1:56.77 (16)	–
NC22	Masahiko Omura	Japan	119.898	39.09 (19)	7:01.75 (16)	1:55.90 (11)	–
NC23	Mark Mitchell	United States	120.497	38.68 (17)	7:04.31 (22)	1:58.16 (25)	–
NC24	Andrej Jermolin	Soviet Union	120.910	39.65 (26)	7:02.34 (19)	1:57.08 (19)	–
NC25	Joakim Karlberg	Sweden	121.078	39.56 (24)	7:04.45 (24)	1:57.22 (10)	–
NC26	Hwang Ik-hwan	South Korea	121.325	38.55 (13)	7:12.92 (33)	1:58.45 (26)	–
NC27	Danny Kah	Australia	121.404	39.27 (22)	7:04.88 (26)	1:58.94 (28)	–
NC28	Roberto Sighel	Italy	121.508	39.02 (18)	7:08.25 (28)	1:58.99 (29)	–
NC29	Werner Jäger	Austria	121.712	39.61 (25)	7:09.46 (30)	1:57.47 (21)	–
NC30	Ari Leppänen	Finland	122.714	39.69 (27)	7:09.44 (29)	2:00.24 (33)	–
NC31	Hans van Helden	France	122.956	39.85 (28)	7:11.46 (32)	1:59.88 (31)	–
NC32	Jiří Kyncl	Czechoslovakia	123.322	40.28 (32)	7:09.72 (31)	2:00.21 (32)	–
NC33	Roman Derks	Poland	123.523	40.46 (33)	7:04.77 (25)	2:01.76 (34)	–
NC34	Behudin Merdovic	Yugoslavia	131.846	42.10 (34)	7:49.70 (35)	2:08.33 (35)	–
NC35	Nils Einar Aas	Norway	141.188	58.60 * (35)	7:08.05 (27)	1:59.35 (30)	–

* = Fell
DQ = Disqualified

== Attribution ==
In Dutch
