= 1986 World Allround Speed Skating Championships =

International speed skating competition

1986 World Allround Speed Skating Championships for Men
- Venue: Ludwig Schwabl Stadion, Inzell, West Germany
- Dates: 15–16 February
- Competitors: 37 skaters from 20 nations

Medalist men
1st place, gold medalist(s)		Hein Vergeer	NED
2nd place, silver medalist(s)		Oleg Bozhev	SOV
3rd place, bronze medalist(s)		Viktor Shasherin	SOV

The World Allround Speed Skating Championships for Men took place on 15 and 16 February 1986 in Inzell at the Ludwig Schwabl Stadion ice rink.

Title holder was the Netherlander Hein Vergeer.

== Classification ==
Rank	Skater	Country	Points Samalog	500m	5000m	1500m	10,000m
1st place, gold medalist(s)	Hein Vergeer	Netherlands	161.936	38.04 (2)	6:54.91 (gold)	1:55.36 (2)	14:39.05 (12)
2nd place, silver medalist(s)	Oleg Bozhev	Soviet Union	162.077	37.99 (1) (gold)	6:58.77 (5)	1:54.95 (gold)	14:37.89 (10)
3rd place, bronze medalist(s)	Viktor Shasherin	Soviet Union	162.727	38.21 (3)	6:55.49 (2)	1:55.77 (3)	14:47.56 (16)
4	Gerard Kemkers	Netherlands	163.660	39.03 (10)	7:00.73 (10)	1:58.11 (11)	14:23.74 (2)
5	Dave Silk	United States	163.832	39.03 (10)	6:59.66 (6)	1:56.79 (5)	14:38.13 (11)
6	Michael Hadschieff	Austria	163.935	38.90 (9)	7:02.98 (14)	1:56.04 (4)	14:41.15 (13)
7	Aleksandr Mozin	Soviet Union	164.098	39.53 (17)	6:56.24 (3)	1:58.26 (13)	14:30.49 (4)
8	Leo Visser	Netherlands	164.441	39.39 (15)	7:00.56 (8)	1:57.83 (8)	14:34.39 (7)
9	Geir Karlstad	Norway	164.487	40.09 (25)	7:02.34 (13)	1:58.67 (15)	14:12.14 (gold)
10	Igor Malkov	Soviet Union	165.024	39.79 (21)	7:00.04 (7)	2:00.00 (27)	14:24.61 (3)
11	Frits Schalij	Netherlands	165.127	39.57 (18)	7:04.73 (16)	1:57.82 (7)	14:36.23 (8)
12	Pertti Niittylä	Finland	165.220	39.85 (23)	7:00.91 (11)	1:59.13 (23)	14:31.39 (5)
13	Christian Eminger	Austria	165.381	40.33 (29)	6:56.93 (4)	1:58.62 (14)	14:36.37 (9)
14	Hans van Helden	France	165.785	39.58 (19)	7:01.43 (12)	1:59.56 (26)	14:44.19 (15)
15	Hansjörg Baltes	West Germany	166.426	40.32 (28)	7:04.08 (15)	1:58.77 (18)	14:42.18 (14)
16	Tomas Gustafson	Sweden	197.885	1:07.85 * (37)	7:00.59 (9)	2:13.13 *(37)	14:32.01 (6)
NC17	Rolf Falk-Larssen	Norway	120.744	38.29 (4)	7:11.51 (23)	1:57.91 (10)	–
NC18	Mark Mitchell	United States	120.950	38.55 (7)	7:08.34 (21)	1:58.70 (16)	–
NC19	Munehisa Kuroiwa	Japan	121.305	39.14 (13)	7:05.89 (17)	1:58.73 (17)	–
NC20	André Hoffmann	East Germany	121.536	38.39 (6)	7:19.23 (30)	1:57.67 (6)	–
NC21	Bjørn Arne Nyland	Norway	121.694	38.88 (8)	7:14.08 (24)	1:58.22 (12)	–
NC22	Bae Ki-Tae	South Korea	121.880	38.35 (5)	7:17.80 (29)	1:59.25 (25)	–
NC23	Uwe Sauerteig	East Germany	121.968	39.48 (16)	7:08.35 (22)	1:58.96 (20)	–
NC24	Werner Jäger	Austria	122.170	39.83 (19)	7:06.70 (22)	1:59.01 (22)	–
NC25	Joakim Karlberg	Sweden	122.179	40.28 (18)	7:06.13 (27)	1:57.86 (9)	–
NC26	Tom Erik Oxholm	Norway	122.676	39.22 (14)	7:17.16 (28)	1:59.22 (24)	–
NC27	Georg Herda	West Germany	122.864	39.12 (12)	7:20.98 (32)	1:58.94 (19)	–
NC28	Benoît Lamarche	Canada	123.542	40.38 * (30)	7:15.09 (26)	1:58.96 (20)	–
NC29	Danny Kah	Australia	123.921	39.73 (20)	7:15.08 (25)	2:02.05 (30)	–
NC30	Heinz Steinberger	Austria	124.713	40.91 (33)	7:15.20 (27)	2:00.85 (28)	–
NC31	Roman Derks	Austria	124.964	41.06 (34)	7:08.21 (20)	2:03.25 (31)	–
NC32	Mario De March	Italy	125.397	40.24 (26)	7:26.51 (34)	2:01.52 (29)	–
NC33	Lü Shuhai	China	126.047	40.61 (31)	7:19.94 (31)	2:04.33 (33)	–
NC34	Gordon Goplen	Canada	126.231	39.85 (23)	7:30.28 (35)	2:04.06 (32)	–
NC35	Jiří Kyncl	Czechoslovakia	128.080	41.07 (35)	7:25.80 (33)	2:07.29 (35)	–
NC36	Pascal Hinni	Switzerland	128.270	40.73 (32)	7:35.84 (36)	2:05.87 (34)	–
NC37	Behudin Merdović	Yugoslavia	134.941	43.15 (36)	7:55.25 (37)	7:55.25 (36)	–

* = Fell
NC = Not qualified for the 10000 m (only the best 16 were qualified)

== Attribution ==
In Dutch
