= Speed skating at the 1992 Winter Olympics – Men's 5000 metres =

Speed skating at the Olympics

Men's 5000 metres at the XVI Olympic Winter Games
- Pictogram for speed skating
- Venue: Stade de Patinage Olympique
- Dates: 13 February 1992
- Competitors: 36 from 20 nations
- Winning time: 6:59.97

Medalists
| 1st place, gold medalist(s) | | Geir Karlstad; Norway |
| 2nd place, silver medalist(s) | | Falko Zandstra; Netherlands |
| 3rd place, bronze medalist(s) | | Leo Visser; Netherlands |

The men's 5000 metres in speed skating at the 1992 Winter Olympics took place on 13 February, at the L'anneau de vitesse.

== Records ==
Prior to this competition, the existing world and Olympic records were as follows:

| World record | Johann Olav Koss (NOR) | 6:41.73 | Heerenveen, Netherlands | 9 February 1991 |
| Olympic record | Tomas Gustafson (SWE) | 6:44.63 | Calgary, Canada | 17 February 1988 |

== Results ==
| Rank | Pair | Lane | Name | Country | Time | Time behind |
|---|---|---|---|---|---|---|
| 1st place, gold medalist(s) | 7 | i | Geir Karlstad | Norway | 6:59.97 | – |
| 2nd place, silver medalist(s) | 5 | i | Falko Zandstra | Netherlands | 7:02.28 | +2.31 |
| 3rd place, bronze medalist(s) | 4 | i | Leo Visser | Netherlands | 7:04.96 | +4.99 |
| 4 | 14 | i | Frank Dittrich | Germany | 7:06.33 | +6.36 |
| 5 | 2 | o | Bart Veldkamp | Netherlands | 7:08.00 | +8.03 |
| 6 | 13 | i | Eric Flaim | United States | 7:11.15 | +11.18 |
| 7 | 3 | i | Johann Olav Koss | Norway | 7:11.32 | +11.35 |
| 8 | 16 | o | Yevgeny Sanarov | Unified Team | 7:11.38 | +11.41 |
| 9 | 15 | i | Jonas Schön | Sweden | 7:12.15 | +12.18 |
| 10 | 10 | o | Michael Hadschieff | Austria | 7:12.97 | +13.00 |
| 11 | 18 | i | Vadim Sayutin | Unified Team | 7:13.20 | +13.23 |
| 12 | 14 | o | Brian Wanek | United States | 7:13.35 | +13.38 |
| 13 | 10 | i | Tomas Gustafson | Sweden | 7:15.56 | +15.59 |
| 14 | 6 | i | Roberto Sighel | Italy | 7:16.55 | +16.58 |
| 15 | 5 | o | Markus Tröger | Germany | 7:17.62 | +17.65 |
| 16 | 6 | o | Jaromir Radke | Poland | 7:18.40 | +18.43 |
| 17 | 1 | i | Kazuhiro Sato | Japan | 7:19.69 | +19.72 |
| 18 | 8 | o | Toshihiko Itokawa | Japan | 7:20.50 | +20.53 |
| 19 | 15 | o | Mark Greenwald | United States | 7:21.19 | +21.22 |
| 20 | 2 | i | Danny Kah | Australia | 7:22.86 | +22.89 |
| 21 | 3 | o | Per Bengtsson | Sweden | 7:23.03 | +23.06 |
| 22 | 9 | i | Keiji Shirahata | Japan | 7:24.95 | +24.98 |
| 23 | 16 | i | O Yong-seok | South Korea | 7:25.31 | +25.34 |
| 24 | 18 | o | Liu Yanfei | China | 7:25.56 | +25.59 |
| 25 | 11 | o | Phillip Tahmindjis | Australia | 7:26.56 | +26.59 |
| 26 | 9 | o | Neal Marshall | Canada | 7:27.64 | +27.67 |
| 27 | 11 | i | Jiří Kyncl | Czechoslovakia | 7:27.78 | +27.81 |
| 28 | 4 | o | Atle Vårvik | Norway | 7:28.28 | +28.31 |
| 29 | 7 | o | Bronislav Snetkov | Unified Team | 7:28.93 | +28.96 |
| 30 | 17 | i | Jiří Musil | Czechoslovakia | 7:29.91 | +29.94 |
| 31 | 17 | o | Nyamdondovyn Ganbold | Mongolia | 7:30.07 | +30.10 |
| 32 | 8 | i | Timo Järvinen | Finland | 7:30.88 | +30.91 |
| 33 | 12 | o | Zsolt Baló | Romania | 7:32.89 | +32.92 |
| 34 | 1 | i | Rudi Jeklic | Germany | 7:33.15 | +33.18 |
| 35 | 13 | o | Thierry Lamberton | France | 7:35.51 | +35.54 |
| 36 | 12 | i | Bajro Čenanović | Yugoslavia | 8:20.30 | +1.20:33 |
