= Speed skating at the 1992 Winter Olympics – Men's 1500 metres =

Speed skating at the Olympics

Men's 1500 metres at the XVI Olympic Winter Games
- Pictogram for speed skating
- Venue: L'anneau de vitesse
- Dates: 16 February 1992
- Competitors: 46 from 21 nations
- Winning time: 1:54.81

Medalists
1st place, gold medalist(s)		Johann Olav Koss; Norway
2nd place, silver medalist(s)		Ådne Søndrål; Norway
3rd place, bronze medalist(s)		Leo Visser; Netherlands

The men's 1500 metres in speed skating at the 1992 Winter Olympics took place on 16 February, at the L'anneau de vitesse.

== Records ==
Prior to this competition, the existing world and Olympic records were as follows:

World record	André Hoffmann (GDR)	1:52.06	Calgary, Canada	20 February 1988
Olympic record	André Hoffmann (GDR)	1:52.06	Calgary, Canada	20 February 1988

== Results ==
Rank	Pair	Lane	Name	Country	Time	Time behind
1st place, gold medalist(s)	8	I	Johann Olav Koss	Norway	1:54.81	-
2nd place, silver medalist(s)	9	O	Ådne Søndrål	Norway	1:54.85	+0.04
3rd place, bronze medalist(s)	5	O	Leo Visser	Netherlands	1:54.90	+0.09
4	6	O	Rintje Ritsma	Netherlands	1:55.70	+0.89
5	11	O	Bart Veldkamp	Netherlands	1:56.33	+1.52
6	6	I	Olaf Zinke	Germany	1:56.74	+1.93
7	3	O	Falko Zandstra	Netherlands	1:56.96	+2.15
8	4	O	Geir Karlstad	Norway	1:56.98	+2.17
9	11	I	Yukinori Miyabe	Japan	1:56.99	+2.18
10	15	I	Igor Zhelezovski	Unified Team	1:57.24	+2.43
11	5	I	Roberto Sighel	Italy	1:57.32	+2.51
12	4	I	Toru Aoyanagi	Japan	1:57.36	+2.55
13	7	I	Markus Tröger	Germany	1:57.42	+2.61
14	8	O	Michael Hadschieff	Austria	1:57.43	+2.62
15	1	O	Peter Adeberg	Germany	1:57.54	+2.73
16	7	O	Paweł Jaroszek	Poland	1:57.80	+2.99
16	14	O	Yuriy Shulha	Unified Team	1:57.80	+2.99
18	20	O	Liu Yanfei	China	1:58.44	+3.63
19	14	I	Brian Wanek	United States	1:58.50	+3.69
20	16	I	Guy Thibault	Canada	1:58.87	+4.06
21	2	I	Bo König	Sweden	1:58.94	+4.13
22	2	O	Konstantin Kalistratov	Unified Team	1:59.02	+4.21
23	1	I	Danny Kah	Australia	1:59.33	+4.52
24	10	O	Roland Brunner	Austria	1:59.60	+4.79
24	10	I	Eric Flaim	United States	1:59.60	+4.79
26	23	I	Joakim Karlberg	Sweden	2:00.01	+5.20
27	12	O	Choi In-Chol	North Korea	2:00.36	+5.55
28	18	I	Kazuhiro Sato	Japan	2:00.51	+5.70
29	3	I	Steinar Johansen	Norway	2:00.79	+5.98
30	13	I	Alessandro De Taddei	Italy	2:00.86	+6.05
31	22	O	Aleksandr Klimov	Unified Team	2:00.94	+6.13
32	15	O	Chris Shelley	United States	2:01.11	+6.30
33	13	O	Zsolt Baló	Romania	2:01.33	+6.52
34	12	I	Jonas Schön	Sweden	2:01.53	+6.72
35	22	I	Nathaniel Mills	United States	2:01.54	+6.73
36	17	I	Neal Marshall	Canada	2:01.62	+6.81
37	17	O	Craig McNicoll	Great Britain	2:02.06	+7.25
38	20	I	Phillip Tahmindjis	Australia	2:02.08	+7.27
39	9	I	O Yong-seok	South Korea	2:02.17	+7.36
40	21	O	Kevin Scott	Canada	2:03.18	+8.37
41	19	O	Thierry Lamberton	France	2:04.04	+9.23
42	19	I	Csaba Madarász	Hungary	2:05.00	+10.19
43	23	O	Altangadasyn Sodnomdarjaa	Mongolia	2:05.43	+10.62
44	21	I	Keiji Shirahata	Japan	2:05.47	+10.66
45	16	O	Bajro Čenanović	Yugoslavia	2:12.09	+17.28
-	18	O	Pat Kelly	Canada	DNF	
