= Nikolay Gulyayev =

Russian speed skater (born 1966)

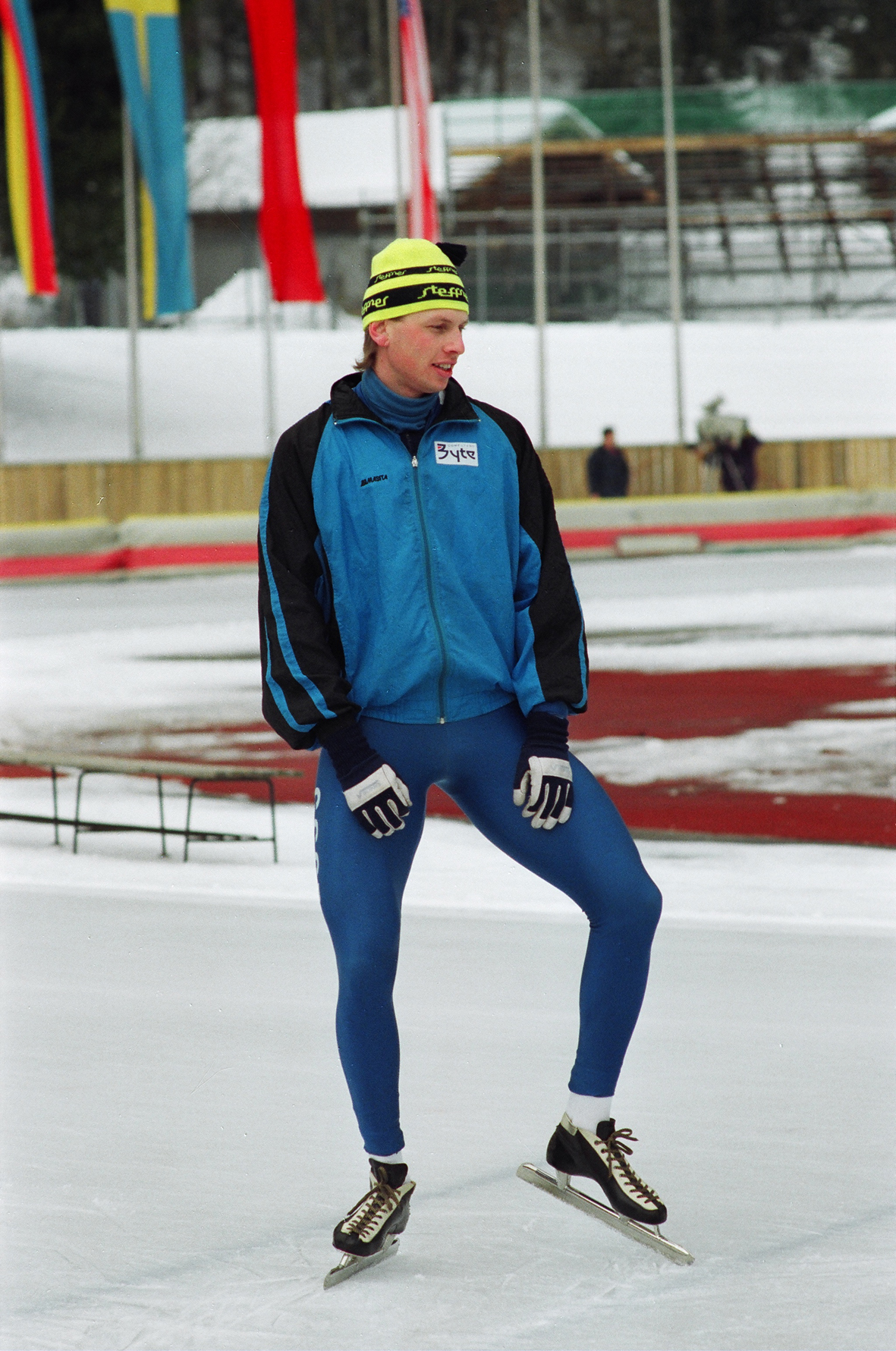

Personal information
- Nationality: Russian
- Born: 1 January 1966 (age 60) Vologda, Russian SFSR, Soviet Union
- Height: 1.92 m (6 ft 4 in)
- Weight: 88 kg (194 lb)

Sport
- Country: Soviet Union
- Sport: Speed skating

Achievements and titles
- Personal best(s): 500 m: 36.84 (1989); 1000 m: 1:13.03 (1988); 1500 m: 1:52.70 (1988); 3000 m: 4:11.2 (1987); 5000 m: 6:51.28 (1987); 10 000 m: 14:28.45 (1987)
Medal record
Men's speed skating
Representing Soviet Union
Olympic Games
Gold medal – first place	1988 Calgary	1,000 m
World Championships
Gold medal – first place	1987 Heerenveen	Allround
European Championships
Gold medal – first place	1987 Trondheim	Allround

Nikolay Alekseyevich Gulyayev (Russian: Николай Алексеевич Гуляев, born 1 January 1966) is a former speed skater, considered among the world's best in the 1980s.

== Biography ==
Nikolay Gulyayev trained at Armed Forces sports society in Moscow. Skating for the Soviet Union, his first international appearance was in 1986 at the European Allround Championships in Oslo. Gulyayev debuted with a 5th place in the tournament won by Dutchman Hein Vergeer and impressed with a 2nd-place finish on the 1,500 metres.

In 1987, he was at the top of the international skating field. In January, he won the European Championships in Trondheim, in front of Michael Hadschieff and Hein Vergeer. Gulyayev held his form until the World Allround Championships in Heerenveen. At these championships, the first to be held in a climate-controlled indoor stadium, he was the first to achieve an overall point total (samalog) below 160.000 points, finishing before fellow countryman Oleg Bozhev and the Austrian Michael Hadschieff. His samalog World Record of 159.356 stood for 4 years before being broken by Johann Olav Koss at the same venue. In Heerenveen he also set the 1,500 metres world record at 1:52.70. For his achievements that year, he received the Oscar Mathisen Award.

His performance at the World Championships in Heerenveen put him in first place on the Adelskalender, the all-time allround speedskating ranking, displacing his compatriot Viktor Shasherin, until, at the 1988 Winter Olympics, Austrian skater Michael Hadschieff took over first place, followed a few days later by Eric Flaim from the United States. Gulyayev was number one in the Adelskalender for 364 days and in the top 10 from February 1987 until January 1994.

For the 1988 Winter Olympics in Calgary, he was a favourite for the 1,500 metres and he was also considered to have a chance for a medal in the 1,000 metres, especially after he won both distances at the World Cup in Inzell, one month before the start of the games. But in the same month, he got caught trying to smuggle 700 capsules of Dianabol, an anabolic steroid. Because of this, he did not defend his European and World titles. Since he never tested positive for steroid use, the IOC could not refuse Gulyayev participation in the 1988 Winter Olympics. He then did compete in Calgary, but under close scrutiny.

In the first distance he participated in, the 500 metres, Gulyayev did not finish because of a fall. Four days later, in the 1,000 metres, despite a strong field of sprinters, he won the gold medal by setting the Olympic 1,000 metre record at 1:13.03, leaving Uwe-Jens Mey and Igor Zhelezovski behind. Two days later, he was favoured at the 1,500 metres, but he finished only 7th. After those Olympics, Gulyayev found himself incapable of competing at the top level of international allround speed skating, so he switched his focus to the shorter sprinting distances. At the 1992 Winter Olympics in Albertville he tried to defend his 1,000 metres title, but he did not get further than the 8th place. In March 1992, he became the Russian Sprint Champion in Kolomna in front of the young Sergey Klevchenya.

Gulyayev had to end his speed skating career because of back problems. These days, he is vice-president of the Russian Speed Skating Federation. His reorganisations may have contributed to Olympic medals at the 2006 Winter Olympics for Dmitry Dorofeyev en Svetlana Zhurova. His aim was to sign on Peter Mueller as the new coach of the Russian team after the Olympics.

== Records ==
=== World records ===
Over the course of his career, Gulyayev skated 2 world records:

Event	Time	Date	Venue
1500 m	1.52,70	15 February 1987	Heerenveen
Big combination	159.356	15 February 1987	Heerenveen

Source: SpeedSkatingStats.com

=== Personal records ===
To put these personal records in perspective, the last column (WR) lists the official world records on the dates that Gulyayev skated his personal records.

Distance	Result	Date	Location	WR
500 m	36.84	22 December 1989	Medeo	36.45
1,000 m	1:13.03	18 February 1988	Calgary	1:12.58
1,500 m	1:52.70	15 February 1987	Heerenveen	1:53.26
3,000 m	4:11.2	17 December 1987	Leningrad	3:59.27
5,000 m	6:51.28	14 February 1987	Heerenveen	6:49.15
10,000 m	14:28.45	15 February 1987	Heerenveen	14:12.14
Big combination	159.356	15 February 1987	Heerenveen	160.807

Gulyayev has an Adelskalender score of 158.956 points. His highest ranking on the Adelskalender was a 1st place.

Awards
Preceded by (Norway) Geir Karlstad	Oscar Mathisen Award; 1987	Succeeded by (Sweden) Tomas Gustafson
