= World record progression 10,000 m speed skating men =

The world record progression 10,000 m speed skating men as recognised by the International Skating Union:

Nr	Name	Nation	Result	Date	Venue	Meeting
1	Oskar Fredriksen	Norway	20:21.4	14 January 1893	Amsterdam	
2	Halfdan Nielsen	Norway	19:47.4	13 February 1893	Stockholm	
3	Frithiof Ericson	Sweden	19:22.8	7 January 1894	Stockholm	
4	Jaap Eden	Netherlands	19:12.4	10 February 1894	Stockholm	
5	Jaap Eden	Netherlands	17:56.0	23 February 1895	Hamar	
6	Peder Østlund	Norway	17:50.6	11 February 1900	Davos	
7	Oscar Mathisen	Norway	17:46.3	18 February 1912	Kristiania	
8	Oscar Mathisen	Norway	17:36.4	25 January 1913	Trondhjem	
9	Oscar Mathisen	Norway	17:22.6	1 February 1913	Kristiania	
10	Armand Carlsen	Norway	17:17.4	5 February 1928	Davos	
11	Ivar Ballangrud	Norway	17:14.4	6 February 1938	Davos	
12	Charles Mathiesen	Norway	17:01.5	3 March 1940	Hamar	
13	Hjalmar Andersen	Norway	16:57.4	6 February 1949	Davos	
14	Hjalmar Andersen	Norway	16:51.4	27 January 1952	Gjøvik	
15	Hjalmar Andersen	Norway	16:32.6	10 February 1952	Hamar	ECh Allround 1952
16	Kjell Bäckman	Sweden	16:14.2	27 February 1960	Squaw Valley	
17	Knut Johannesen	Norway	15:46.6	27 February 1960	Squaw Valley	OG 1960
18	Jonny Nilsson	Sweden	15:33.0	24 February 1963	Karuizawa	WCh Allround 1963
19	Fred Anton Maier	Norway	15:32.2	6 February 1966	Oslo	
20	Fred Anton Maier	Norway	15:31.8	28 February 1967	Inzell	
21	Fred Anton Maier	Norway	15:29.5	21 January 1968	Horten	
22	Fred Anton Maier	Norway	15:20.3	28 January 1968	Oslo	
23	Per Willy Guttormsen	Norway	15:16.1	10 March 1968	Inzell	
24	Kees Verkerk	Netherlands	15:03.6	26 January 1969	Inzell	ECh 1969
25	Ard Schenk	Netherlands	15:01.6	14 February 1971	Gothenburg	WCh 1971
26	Ard Schenk	Netherlands	14:55.9	14 March 1971	Inzell	
27	Viktor Varlamov	Soviet Union	14:52.73	25 March 1975	Medeo	
28	Sten Stensen	Norway	14:50.31	25 January 1976	Oslo	ECh 1976
29	Piet Kleine	Netherlands	14:43.92	13 March 1976	Inzell	
30	Sten Stensen	Norway	14:38.08	21 March 1976	Medeo	
31	Viktor Lyoshkin	Soviet Union	14:34.33	3 April 1977	Medeo	
32	Eric Heiden	USA	14:28.13	23 February 1980	Lake Placid	OG 1980
33	Dmitry Ogloblin	Soviet Union	14:26.71	29 March 1980	Medeo	
34	Tomas Gustafson	Sweden	14:23.59	31 January 1982	Oslo	Allround ECh 1982
35	Igor Malkov	Soviet Union	14:21.51	24 March 1984	Medeo	
36	Geir Karlstad	Norway	14:12.14	16 February 1986	Inzell	Allround WCh 1986
37	Geir Karlstad	Norway	14:03.92	15 February 1987	Heerenveen	Allround WCh 1987
38	Geir Karlstad	Norway	13:48.51	6 December 1987	Calgary	Speed skating World Cup 1986/87 – World Cup 3
39	Tomas Gustafson	Sweden	13:48.20	21 February 1988	Calgary	OG 1988
40	Johann Olav Koss	Norway	13:43.54	10 February 1991	Heerenveen	Allround WCh 1991
41	Johann Olav Koss	Norway	13:30.55	20 February 1994	Hamar	OG 1994
42	Gianni Romme	Netherlands	13:15.33	17 February 1998	Nagano	OG 1998
43	Gianni Romme	Netherlands	13:08.71	29 March 1998	Calgary	World Single Distance Championships
44	Gianni Romme	Netherlands	13:03.40	26 November 2000	Heerenveen	
45	Jochem Uytdehaage	Netherlands	12:58.92	22 February 2002	Salt Lake City	OG 2002
46	Carl Verheijen	Netherlands	12:57.92	4 December 2005	Heerenveen	
47	Chad Hedrick	United States	12:55.11	31 December 2005	Salt Lake City	
48	Sven Kramer	Netherlands	12:51.60	19 March 2006	Calgary	Allround WCh 2006
49	Sven Kramer	Netherlands	12:49.88	11 February 2007	Heerenveen	Allround WCh 2007
50	Sven Kramer	Netherlands	12:41.69	10 March 2007	Salt Lake City	World Single Distance Championships
51	Ted-Jan Bloemen	Canada	12:36.30	21 November 2015	Salt Lake City	World Cup
52	Graeme Fish	Canada	12:33.86	14 February 2020	Salt Lake City	World Single Distance Championships
53	Nils van der Poel	Sweden	12:32.95	14 February 2021	Heerenveen	World Single Distance Championships
54	Nils van der Poel	Sweden	12:30.74	11 February 2022	Beijing	OG 2022
55	Davide Ghiotto	Italy	12:25.69	25 January 2025	Calgary	2024–25 ISU World Cup 3
