= World record progression 5000 m speed skating men =

The world record progression 5000 m speed skating men as recognised by the International Skating Union:

Nr.	Name	Country	Result	Date	Venue	
1	Oskar Fredriksen	Norway	9:19.8	2 March 1890	Stockholm	
2	Einar Halvorsen	Norway	9:10.2	28 February 1892	Hamar	
3	Einar Halvorsen	Norway	9:07.0	26 February 1893	Hamar	
4	Jaap Eden	Netherlands	8:37.6	25 February 1894	Hamar	
5	Nikolay Strunnikov	Russia	8:37.2	4 February 1911	Kristiania	
6	Oscar Mathisen	Norway	8:36.6	17 January 1914	Davos	
7	Oscar Mathisen	Norway	8:36.3	23 January 1916	Kristiania	
8	Harald Strøm	Norway	8:33.7	4 February 1917	Trondhjem	
9	Harald Strøm	Norway	8:27.7	20 February 1921	Kristiania	
10	Harald Strøm	Norway	8:26.5	18 February 1922	Kristiania	
11	Ivar Ballangrud	Norway	8:24.2	19 January 1929	Davos	
12	Ivar Ballangrud	Norway	8:21.6	11 January 1930	Davos	
13	Siem Heiden	Netherlands	8:19.2	22 January 1933	Davos	
14	Max Stiepl	Austria	8:18.9	3 February 1934	Hamar	
15	Ivar Ballangrud	Norway	8:17.2	18 January 1936	Oslo	
16	Åke Seyffarth	Sweden	8:13.7	3 February 1941	Davos	
17	Kornél Pajor	Hungary	8:13.5	5 February 1949	Davos	
18	Hjalmar Andersen	Norway	8:07.3	13 January 1951	Trondheim	
19	Nikolay Mamonov	Soviet Union	8:03.7	23 January 1952	Medeo	
20	Boris Shilkov	Soviet Union	7:45.6	9 January 1955	Medeo	
21	Knut Johannesen	Norway	7:37.8	26 January 1963	Oslo	
22	Jonny Nilsson	Sweden	7:34.3	23 February 1963	Karuizawa	Allround WCh 1963
23	Jonny Nilsson	Sweden	7:33.2	13 February 1965	Oslo	
24	Fred Anton Maier	Norway	7:28.1	4 March 1965	Notodden	
25	Kees Verkerk	Netherlands	7:26.6	26 February 1967	Inzell	
26	Fred Anton Maier	Norway	7:26.2	7 January 1968	Deventer	
27	Fred Anton Maier	Norway	7:22.4	15 February 1968	Grenoble	OG 1968
28	Fred Anton Maier	Norway	7:16.7	9 March 1968	Inzell	
29	Kees Verkerk	Netherlands	7:13.2	1 March 1969	Inzell	Allround ECh 1969
30	Ard Schenk	Netherlands	7:12.0	13 March 1971	Inzell	
31	Ard Schenk	Netherlands	7:09.8	4 March 1972	Inzell	
32	Yury Kondakov	Soviet Union	7:08.92	24 March 1975	Medeo	
33	Hans van Helden	Netherlands	7:07.82	30 January 1976	Davos	
34	Piet Kleine	Netherlands	7:04.86	5 March 1976	Inzell	
35	Piet Kleine	Netherlands	7:02.38	12 March 1976	Inzell	
36	Kay Arne Stenshjemmet	Norway	6:56.9	19 March 1977	Medeo	
37	Aleksandr Baranov	Soviet Union	6:54.66	18 March 1982	Medeo	
38	Viktor Shasherin	Soviet Union	6:49.15	23 March 1984	Medeo	
39	Leo Visser	Netherlands	6:47.01	14 February 1987	Heerenveen	Allround WCh 1987
40	Geir Karlstad	Norway	6:45.44	22 November 1987	Heerenveen	
41	Geir Karlstad	Norway	6:43.59	4 December 1987	Calgary	
42	Johann Olav Koss	Norway	6:41.73	9 February 1991	Heerenveen	Allround WCh 1991
43	Johann Olav Koss	Norway	6:38.77	22 January 1993	Heerenveen	ECh 1993
44	Johann Olav Koss	Norway	6:36.57	13 March 1993	Heerenveen	
45	Johann Olav Koss	Norway	6:35.53	4 December 1993	Hamar	
46	Johann Olav Koss	Norway	6:34.96	13 February 1994	Hamar	OG 1994
47	Gianni Romme	Netherlands	6:30.63	7 December 1997	Heerenveen	
48	Gianni Romme	Netherlands	6:22.20	8 February 1998	Nagano	OG 1998
49	Gianni Romme	Netherlands	6:21.49	27 March 1998	Calgary	
50	Gianni Romme	Netherlands	6:18.72	30 January 2000	Calgary	
51	Jochem Uytdehaage	Netherlands	6:14.66	9 February 2002	Salt Lake City	OG 2002
52	Chad Hedrick	United States	6:09.68	13 November 2005	Calgary	
53	Sven Kramer	Netherlands	6:08.78	19 November 2005	Salt Lake City	
54	Sven Kramer	Netherlands	6:07.48	3 March 2007	Calgary	
55	Enrico Fabris	Italy	6:07.40	10 November 2007	Salt Lake City	
56	Sven Kramer	Netherlands	6:03.32	17 November 2007	Calgary	
57	Ted-Jan Bloemen	Canada	6:01.86	10 December 2017	Salt Lake City	
58	Nils van der Poel	Sweden	6:01.56	3 December 2021	Salt Lake City	
59	Timothy Loubineaud	France	6:00.23	14 November 2025	Salt Lake City	WC 1 2025
60	Sander Eitrem	Norway	5:58.52	24 January 2026	Inzell	WC 5 2026
