= Jiří Musil =

Jiří Musil may refer to:

- Jiří Musil (figure skater) (1957–2025), ice dancer for Czechoslovakia
- Jiří Musil (speed skater) (born 1965), Czech speed skater at the 1992 Winter Olympics
