= Halfdan Nielsen =

Norwegian speed skater

Halfdan Nicolaus Nielsen (26 March 1874 – 21 June 1952) was a Norwegian speedskater.

He was the second registered world record holder in 10,000 m, when he improved Oskar Fredriksen's record in Stockholm in 1893.

== World record ==
Discipline	Time	Date	Location
10,000 m	19.47,4	February 13, 1893	(Sweden) Stockholm

Source: SpeedSkatingStats.com
