= Vergeer =

Vergeer is a surname. Notable people with the surname include:

- Esther Vergeer (born 1981), Dutch wheelchair tennis player
- Hein Vergeer (born 1961), Dutch speed skater
