= Konstantin Kalistratov =

Soviet speed skater

Personal information
- Nationality: Soviet
- Born: 14 August 1967 (age 57); Osh, Kyrgyzstan

Sport
- Sport: Speed skating

Konstantin Kalistratov (born 14 August 1967) is a Soviet speed skater. He competed in the men's 1500 metres event at the 1992 Winter Olympics.
