= Tomas Gustafson =

Swedish speed skater (born 1959)

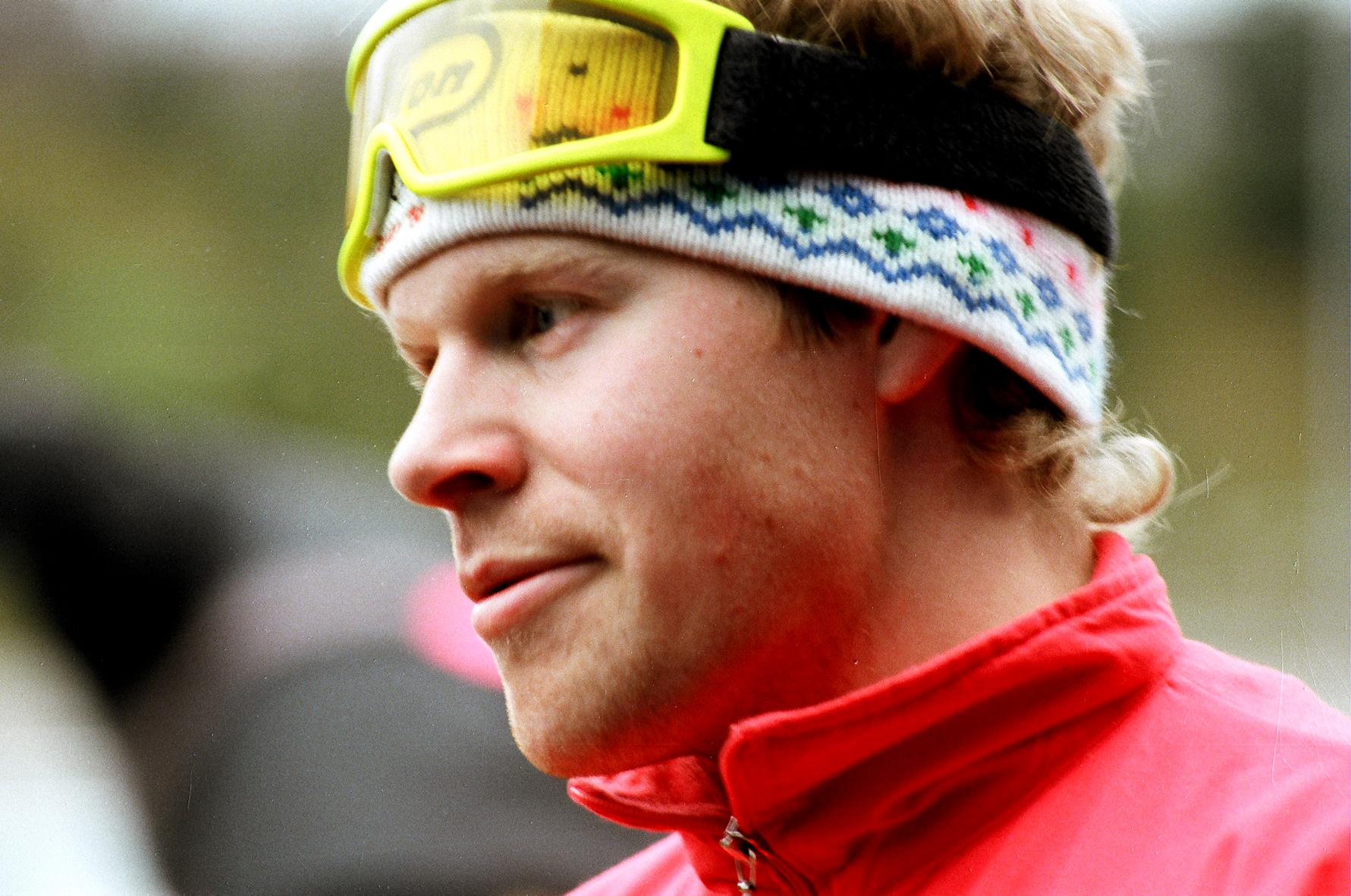
- Gustafson in 2010

Personal information
- Nationality: Swedish
- Born: Sven Tomas Gustafson; 28 December 1959 (age 66) Katrineholm, Sweden
- Height: 1.75 m (5 ft 9 in)
- Weight: 70 kg (154 lb)
- Spouse: Elisabet Gustafson

Sport
- Country: Sweden
- Sport: Speed skating
- Turned pro: 1979
- Retired: 1992

Achievements and titles
- Personal best(s): 500 m: 38.10 (1990); 1000 m: 1:18.48 (1981); 1500 m: 1:53.22 (1990); 3000 m: 4:03.17 (1987); 5000 m: 6:44.51 (1987); 10 000 m: 13:48.20 (1988)
Medal record
Men's speed skating
Olympic Games
Gold medal – first place	1984 Sarajevo	5000 m
Gold medal – first place	1988 Calgary	5000 m
Gold medal – first place	1988 Calgary	10,000 m
Silver medal – second place	1984 Sarajevo	10,000 m
World Championships
Silver medal – second place	1983 Oslo	Allround
European Championships
Gold medal – first place	1982 Oslo	Allround
Gold medal – first place	1988 The Hague	Allround
Silver medal – second place	1990 Heerenveen	Allround
Bronze medal – third place	1986 Oslo	Allround

Sven Tomas Gustafson (born 28 December 1959) is a retired Swedish speed skater and distance skater, active in the 1980s, who won several events and set world records.

== Early career ==
Born in Katrineholm, he won the World Junior Championships title in Grenoble, France, in 1979. A year later, at the European Championships for seniors, he finished 4th. The following month, he participated in the 1980 Winter Olympics at Lake Placid, New York, US achieving a 7th place finish in the 1500 m as his best performance. Later that same month, he defended his Junior World title.

== 1982 to Sarajevo leadup ==
In 1982, he became allround European Champion in Oslo, where he set a 10,000 m world record. As of 2017 this was the last outdoor world record for men on a lowland track. For this performance, he was awarded the Oscar Mathisen Award for the best skating performance of the season. A year later, on the same track, he won silver at the World Allround Championships, finishing second behind Rolf Falk-Larssen. Gustafson had the better allround point total (samalog), but Falk-Larssen was declared champion due to a rule stating that a skater winning three of the four distances and finishing the fourth was automatically pronounced the champion. This result caused a renewed debate about the three-distance-wins rule, which was subsequently abolished. From 1984 onwards, the champion was determined by the skater with the best samalog point sum.

== Sarajevo to Calgary leadup ==
The following year, his focus shifted from the World Allround Championships to the 1984 Winter Olympics at Sarajevo. He won Olympic gold in the 5,000 m, finishing just two hundredths of a second ahead of Soviet skater Igor Malkov. In the 10,000 m he again faced a close finish with Malkov, this time losing by five hundredths of a second. Following these Olympics, Gustafson underwent knee surgery, contracted meningitis, and his father died.

== Calgary ==
In January 1988, he won the European Allround Championships in The Hague, the only speedskater to win at all four distances since the Second World War. His rival Malkov had retired, and Gustafson focused on outpacing long-distance skaters such as Dutchmen Leo Visser and Gerard Kemkers and Austrian skater Michael Hadschieff. Gustafson first succeeded in the 5000 m. He trailed Leo Visser's pace by eight hundredths of a second with only 400 m remaining but skated a strong final lap to win by one third of a second. Four days later, he won Olympic gold again, this time in the 10,000 m, setting a new world record time of 13:48.20, broken three years later by Johann Olav Koss. Gustafson received the Oscar Mathisen Award again for his 1988 performances. He also earned the Svenska Dagbladet Gold Medal and the Jerring Award.

== Late career ==
Gustafson's only notable achievement after the 1988 Winter Olympics in Calgary was a second-place finish behind Bart Veldkamp in the 1990 European Allround Championships. At the 1992 Winter Olympics in Albertville, he only took part in the 5000 m race, finishing 13th; this was Gustafson's last international race.

== Personal life ==
Gustafson is married to curler Elisabet Gustafson.

== Records ==
=== World records ===
Gustafson set two world records:

Discipline	Time	Date	Location
10,000 m	14:23.59	January 31, 1982	Oslo
10,000 m	13:48.20	February 21, 1988	Calgary

Source: SpeedSkatingStats.com

=== Personal records ===
Distance	Time	Date	Location
500 m	38.10	19 January 1990	Heerenveen
1000 m	1:18.48	15 March 1981	Savalen
1500 m	1:53.22	8 December 1990	Calgary
3000 m	4:03.17	26 December 1987	Inzell
5000 m	6:44.51	4 December 1987	Calgary
10,000 m	13:48.20	21 February 1988	Calgary
Big combination	160.347	21 January 1990	Heerenveen

Gustafson holds an Adelskalender score of 157.701 points. In March 1988, he reached third place in the ranking, behind Eric Flaim and Michael Hadschieff. After improving his personal best time in the 1500 metres distance in December 1990, he reached second place. Gustafson was ranked among the top 3 for 1468 days.

Awards
Preceded by (Norway) Amund Sjøbrend	Oscar Mathisen Award; 1982	Succeeded by (Norway) Rolf Falk-Larssen
Preceded by (Soviet Union) Nikolay Gulyayev	Oscar Mathisen Award; 1988	Succeeded by (Netherlands) Leo Visser
Preceded by Swedish men's ice hockey team and Marie-Helene Westin	Svenska Dagbladet Gold Medal; 1988	Succeeded by Sweden national table tennis team
