= Oscar Mathisen Award =

Sports award

Beginning in 1959 the Oscar Mathisen Award (also known as the Oscar Mathisen Memorial Award, the Oscar Mathisen Memorial Trophy, and sometimes the Skating Oscar) has been awarded annually to the skater with the most outstanding speed skating performance of the season. The award was introduced by Oslo Skøiteklub (Oslo Skating Club, OSK) to commemorate the legendary Norwegian speed skater Oscar Mathisen (1888–1954). The winner is awarded a miniature of a statue of Oscar Mathisen created by the sculptor Arne Durban. The statue is placed outside Frogner Stadium in Oslo, the venue of many of Oscar Mathisen's most memorable victories.

For the first eight years (1959–1966) no repeat winners were allowed, and women were not eligible to win until 1987. Since its inception in 1959 it has been awarded 67 times to 51 skaters (42 men and 9 women) from 11 countries. Eric Heiden from the United States holds the record for most awards (4 times in 1977–1980) while Gunda Niemann from Germany is the only woman who received this award more than once (3 times in 1995–1997).

== Oscar Mathisen Award winners ==
Year	Winner	Country
1959	Knut Johannesen	Norway
1960	Boris Stenin	Soviet Union
1961	Henk van der Grift	Netherlands
1962	Jonny Nilsson	Sweden
1963	Nils Aaness	Norway
1964	Ants Antson	Soviet Union
1965	Per Ivar Moe	Norway
1966	Kees Verkerk	Netherlands
1967	Kees Verkerk	Netherlands
1968	Fred Anton Maier	Norway
1969	Dag Fornæss	Norway
1970	Ard Schenk	Netherlands
1971	Ard Schenk	Netherlands
1972	Ard Schenk	Netherlands
1973	Göran Claeson	Sweden
1974	Sten Stensen	Norway
1975	Yevgeny Kulikov	Soviet Union
1976	Sten Stensen	Norway
1977	Eric Heiden	United States
1978	Eric Heiden	United States
1979	Eric Heiden	United States
1980	Eric Heiden	United States
1981	Amund Sjøbrend	Norway
1982	Tomas Gustafson	Sweden
1983	Rolf Falk-Larssen	Norway
1984	Gaétan Boucher	Canada
1985	Hein Vergeer	Netherlands
1986	Geir Karlstad	Norway
1987	Nikolay Gulyayev	Soviet Union
1988	Tomas Gustafson	Sweden
1989	Leo Visser	Netherlands
1990	Johann Olav Koss	Norway
1991	Johann Olav Koss	Norway
1992	Bonnie Blair	United States
1993	Falko Zandstra	Netherlands
1994	Johann Olav Koss	Norway
1995	Gunda Niemann	Germany
1996	Gunda Niemann	Germany
1997	Gunda Niemann	Germany
1998	Ådne Søndrål	Norway
1999	Rintje Ritsma	Netherlands
2000	Gianni Romme	Netherlands
2001	Hiroyasu Shimizu	Japan
2002	Jochem Uytdehaage	Netherlands
2003	Anni Friesinger	Germany
2004	Chad Hedrick	United States
2005	Shani Davis	United States
2006	Cindy Klassen	Canada
2007	Sven Kramer	Netherlands
2008	Jeremy Wotherspoon	Canada
2009	Shani Davis	United States
2010	Martina Sáblíková	Czech Republic
2011	Bob de Jong	Netherlands
2012	Christine Nesbitt	Canada
2013	Ireen Wüst	Netherlands
2014	Jorrit Bergsma	Netherlands
2015	Brittany Bowe	United States
2016	Ted-Jan Bloemen	Canada
2017	Sven Kramer	Netherlands
2018	Håvard Holmefjord Lorentzen	Norway
2019	Kjeld Nuis	Netherlands
2020	Natalya Voronina	Russia
2021	Nils van der Poel	Sweden
2022	Nils van der Poel	Sweden
2023	Jordan Stolz	United States
2024	Jordan Stolz	United States
2025	Davide Ghiotto	Italy

=== Number of awards by country ===
Awards won	Country
18	Netherlands
15	Norway
11	United States
6	Sweden
5	Canada
4	Germany
4	Soviet Union
1	Czech Republic
1	Italy
1	Japan
1	Russia

=== Number of awards by person ===
Awards won	Skater	Country	Year(s)
4	Eric Heiden	United States	1977, 1978, 1979, 1980
3	Johann Olav Koss	Norway	1990, 1991, 1994
3	Gunda Niemann	Germany	1995, 1996, 1997
3	Ard Schenk	Netherlands	1970, 1971, 1972
2	Shani Davis	United States	2005, 2009
2	Tomas Gustafson	Sweden	1982, 1988
2	Sven Kramer	Netherlands	2007, 2017
2	Sten Stensen	Norway	1974, 1976
2	Jordan Stolz	United States	2023, 2024
2	Nils van der Poel	Sweden	2021, 2022
2	Kees Verkerk	Netherlands	1966, 1967
1	Nils Aaness	Norway	1963
1	Ants Antson	Soviet Union	1964
1	Jorrit Bergsma	Netherlands	2014
1	Bonnie Blair	United States	1992
1	Ted-Jan Bloemen	Canada	2016
1	Gaétan Boucher	Canada	1984
1	Brittany Bowe	United States	2015
1	Göran Claeson	Sweden	1973
1	Bob de Jong	Netherlands	2011
1	Rolf Falk-Larssen	Norway	1983
1	Dag Fornæss	Norway	1969
1	Anni Friesinger	Germany	2003
1	Davide Ghiotto	Italy	2025
1	Nikolay Gulyayev	Soviet Union	1987
1	Chad Hedrick	United States	2004
1	Knut Johannesen	Norway	1959
1	Geir Karlstad	Norway	1986
1	Cindy Klassen	Canada	2006
1	Yevgeny Kulikov	Soviet Union	1975
1	Håvard Holmefjord Lorentzen	Norway	2018
1	Fred Anton Maier	Norway	1968
1	Per Ivar Moe	Norway	1965
1	Christine Nesbitt	Canada	2012
1	Jonny Nilsson	Sweden	1962
1	Kjeld Nuis	Netherlands	2019
1	Rintje Ritsma	Netherlands	1999
1	Gianni Romme	Canada	2000
1	Martina Sáblíková	Czech Republic	2010
1	Hiroyasu Shimizu	Japan	2001
1	Amund Sjøbrend	Norway	1981
1	Ådne Søndrål	Norway	1998
1	Boris Stenin	Soviet Union	1960
1	Jochem Uytdehaage	Netherlands	2002
1	Henk van der Grift	Netherlands	1961
1	Hein Vergeer	Netherlands	1985
1	Leo Visser	Netherlands	1989
1	Natalya Voronina	Russia	2020
1	Jeremy Wotherspoon	Canada	2008
1	Ireen Wüst	Netherlands	2013
1	Falko Zandstra	Netherlands	1993
