= Chris Shelley =

American speed skater

Personal information
- Born: June 22, 1963 (age 61); Boston, Massachusetts, United States

Sport
- Sport: Speed skating

Chris Shelley (born June 22, 1963) is an American speed skater. He competed in the men's 1500 metres event at the 1992 Winter Olympics. Shelley later moved to Calgary and became the coach of the Canadian national team.
