= Oskar Fredriksen (speed skater) =

Norwegian speed skater

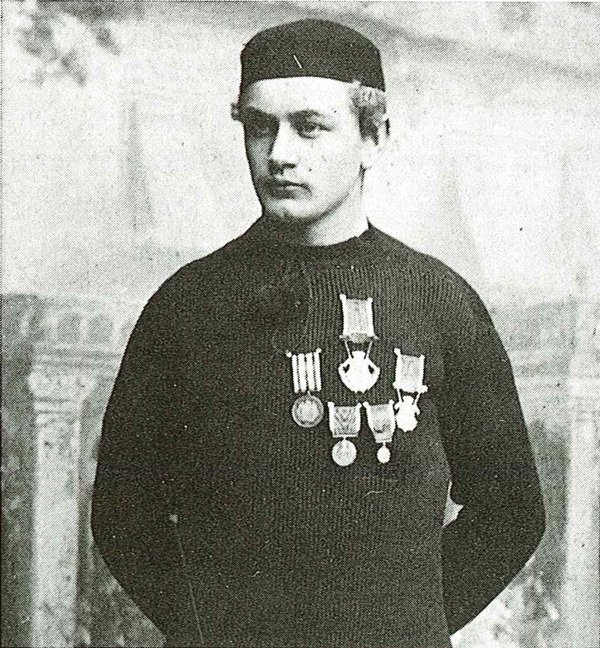
Oskar Fredriksen

Oskar Fredriksen (4 July 1870 – 16 August 1920) was a Norwegian speedskater.

In 1890 he became the first registered world record holder in the 5,000-meter race. He did it again in 1893 in the 10,000-meter race. In 1894 Fredriksen set a world record in the 500-meter race with a time of 47.8 seconds.

== World records ==
Discipline	Time	Date	Location
5000 m	9.19,8	2 March 1890	(Sweden) Stockholm
10,000 m	20.21,4	14 January 1893	(Netherlands) Amsterdam
500 m	0.47,8	21 January 1894	(Norway) Kristiania

Source: SpeedSkatingStats.com
