= Oleg Bozhev =

Soviet speed skater

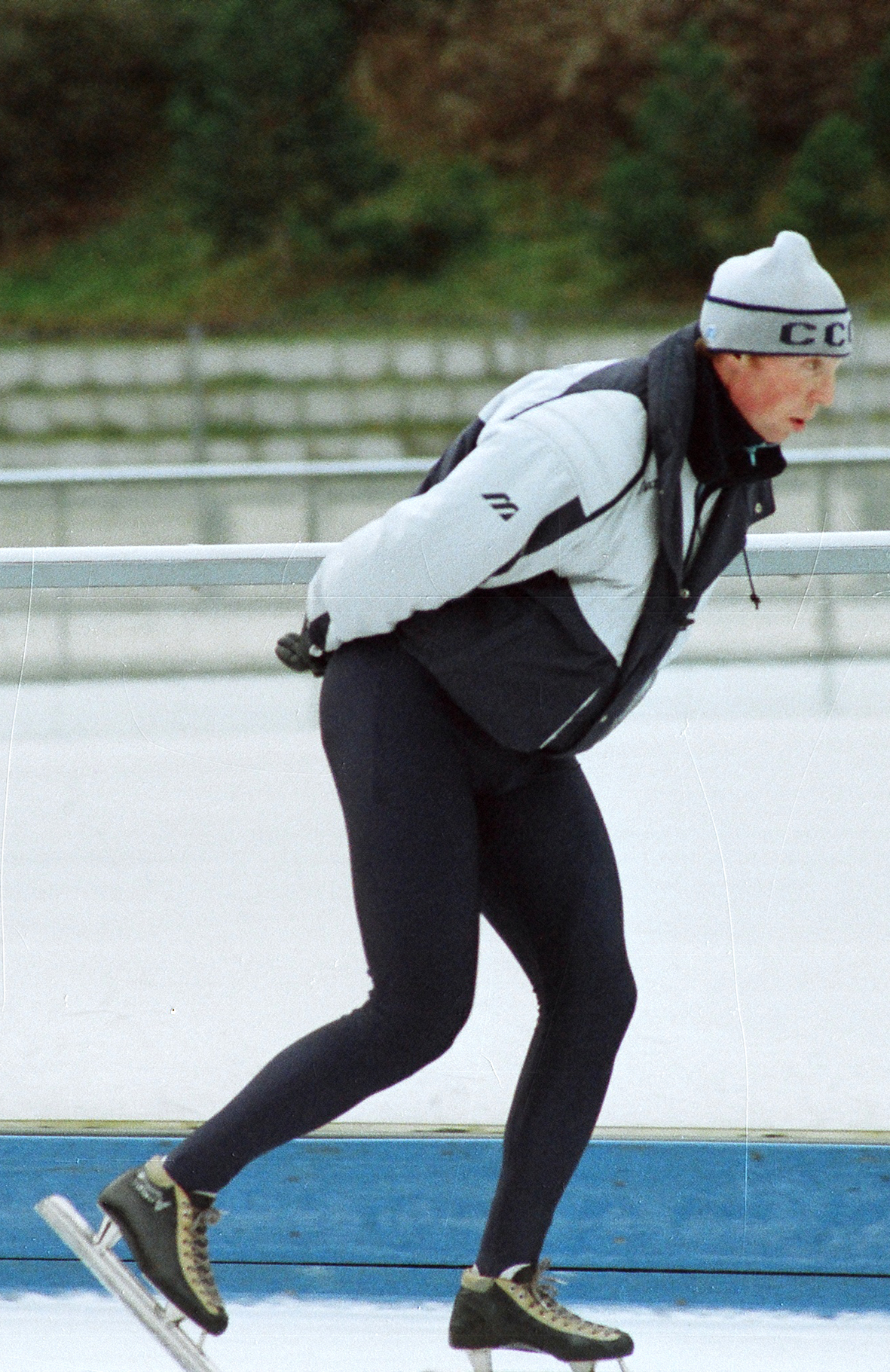

Personal information
- Nationality: Russian
- Born: Oleg Felevich Bozhev; 25 August 1961 (age 64) Moscow, Russian SFSR, Soviet Union

Sport
- Country: Soviet Union
- Sport: Speed skating
- Turned pro: 1984
- Retired: 1992

Achievements and titles
- Personal best(s): 500 m: 36.88 (1985); 1000 m: 1:14.31 (1985); 1500 m: 1:53.26 (1984); 3000 m: 4:03.05 (1987); 5000 m: 6:56.73 (1987); 10 000 m: 14:26.11 (1987)
Medal record
Representing Soviet Union
Men's speed skating
Bronze medal – third place	1984 Sarajevo	1,500 m

Oleg Felevich Bozhev (Russian: Олег Фелевич Божьев) (born 25 August 1961) is a Russian former speed skater. He trained at VSS Trud.

== Biography ==
Competing for the Soviet Union, Oleg Bozhev had his best year in 1984 when he won a bronze medal on the 1,500 m at the Winter Olympics in Sarajevo, became World Allround Champion ten days later, became Soviet Allround Champion two weeks after that and skated a world record on the 1,500 m another two weeks later. He also was awarded the Order of Friendship of Peoples that year. The following three years (1985–1987), he won silver at the World Allround Championships. The closest he came to winning a second World Allround Championship was in 1986 when he finished second behind Hein Vergeer, with a difference of only 0.141 points, which translates to a mere 2.8 seconds of difference on the final distance (the 10,000 m). Except for one more international appearance in 1992, his last international appearance was in 1988.

Bozhev currently is the senior coach of the Russian skating team.

== Medals ==
An overview of medals won by Bozhev at important championships he participated in, listing the years in which he won each:

Championships	Gold medal	Silver medal	Bronze medal
Winter Olympics	–	–	1984 (1,500 m)
World Allround	1984	1985; 1986; 1987	–
European Allround	–	–	1985
Soviet Allround	1984	1986	1987

== Records ==
=== World records ===
Over the course of his career, Bozhev skated one world record:

Discipline	Time	Date	Location
1500 m	1.53,26	24 March 1984	(Soviet Union) Medeo

Source: SpeedSkatingStats.com

=== Personal records ===
To put these personal records in perspective, the WR column lists the official world records on the dates that Bozhev skated his personal records.

Event	Result	Date	Venue	WR
500 m	36.88	28 March 1985	Medeo	36.57
1,000 m	1:14.31	28 March 1985	Medeo	1:12.58
1,500 m	1:53.26	24 March 1984	Medeo	1:54.26
3,000 m	4:03.05	19 March 1987	Heerenveen	4:03.22
5,000 m	6:56.73	14 February 1987	Heerenveen	6:49.15
10,000 m	14:26.11	15 February 1987	Heerenveen	14:12.14
Big combination	160.558	15 February 1987	Heerenveen	160.807

Note that Bozhev's personal record on the 3,000 m was not a world record because Leo Visser skated 3:59.27 at the same tournament. Bozhev's personal record on the big combination was not a world record either because Nikolay Gulyayev skated 159.356 at the same tournament.

Bozhev has an Adelskalender score of 159.611 points. His highest ranking on the Adelskalender was a third place.
