= Roland Freier =

German speed skater

Personal information
- Nationality: German
- Born: 16 January 1964 (age 61); Barth, East Germany

Sport
- Sport: Speed skating

Roland Freier (born 16 January 1964) is a German former speed skater. He competed in two events at the 1988 Winter Olympics representing East Germany.
