= Bruno Milesi =

Italian speed skater

Personal information
- Nationality: Italian
- Born: 1 February 1965 (age 61) Bruneck, Italy

Sport
- Sport: Speed skating

Bruno Milesi (born 1 February 1965) is an Italian speed skater. He competed in two events at the 1988 Winter Olympics.
