= Jiří Musil (speed skater) =

Czech speed skater

Personal information
- Nationality: Czech
- Born: 21 June 1965 (age 59); Prague, Czechoslovakia

Sport
- Sport: Speed skating

Jiří Musil (born 21 June 1965) is a Czech speed skater. He competed in three events at the 1992 Winter Olympics.
