= Aleksandr Mozin =

Russian speed skater

Personal information
- Born: 9 June 1961
- Died: 20 February 2021 (aged 59)
- Height: 1.85 m (6 ft 1 in)
- Weight: 85 kg (187 lb)

Sport
- Sport: Speed skating
- Club: Dynamo Gorky, Nizhny Novgorod
Medal record
Representing the Soviet Union
European Speed Skating Championships
Silver medal – second place	1986 Oslo	All-round

Aleksandr Mozin (Russian: Александр Мозин; 9 June 1961 – 20 February 2021) was a Russian speed skater who won the silver all-round medal at the European championships in 1986. He competed at the 1988 Winter Olympics in the 10,000 m event and finished in 18th place.

Personal bests

- 500 m – 39.49 (1984)
- 1000 m – 1:20.92 (1985)
- 1500 m – 1:56.8 (1985)
- 5000 m – 6:55.54 (1981)
- 10000 m – 14:28.91 (1988)
