= Hein Vergeer =

Dutch speed skater

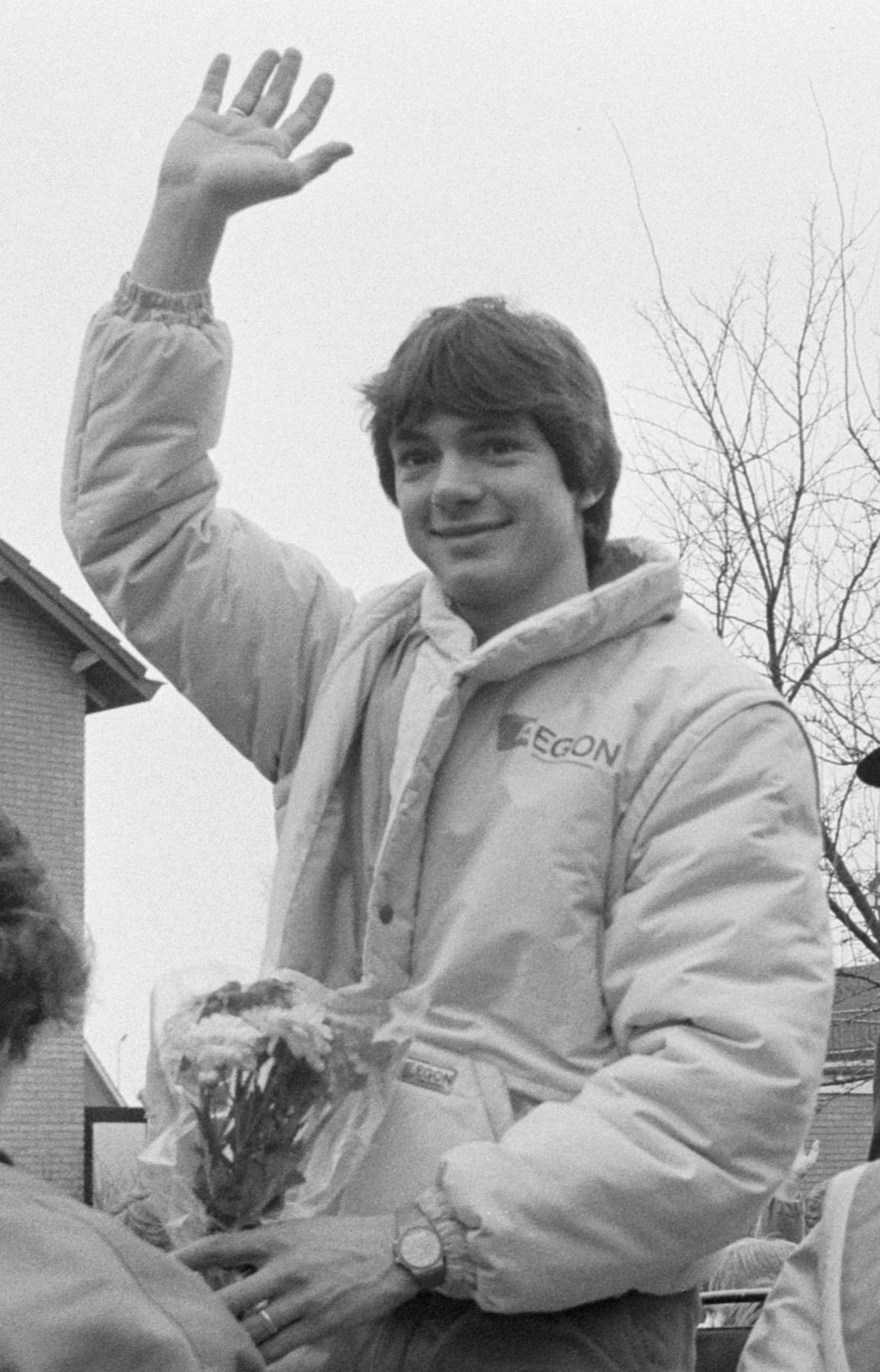
- Hein Vergeer in 1985

Personal information
- Nationality: Dutch
- Born: Henricus Coenradus Nicolaas Vergeer; 2 May 1961 (age 65) Haastrecht, Netherlands
- Height: 1.80 m (5 ft 11 in)
- Weight: 75 kg (165 lb)

Sport
- Country: Netherlands
- Sport: Speed skating
- Turned pro: 1980
- Coached by: Henk Gemser
- Retired: 1988

Achievements and titles
- Personal bests: 500 m: 37.79 (1987); 1000 m: 1:14.62 (1988); 1500 m: 1:53.88 (1987); 3000 m: 4:01.21 (1987); 5000 m: 6:54.91 (1986); 10 000 m: 14:39.05 (1986)
Medal record
Representing the Netherlands
Men's Speed Skating
World Allround Championships
| Gold medal – first place | 1985 Hamar | Allround |
| Gold medal – first place | 1986 Inzell | Allround |
European Allround Championships
| Gold medal – first place | 1985 Eskilstuna | Allround |
| Gold medal – first place | 1986 Oslo | Allround |
| Bronze medal – third place | 1987 Trondheim | Allround |

Henricus Coenradus Nicolaas "Hein" Vergeer (born 2 May 1961) is a Dutch former speed skater who became both European and World Allround Champion in both 1985 (in which year he also became National Sprint Champion) and 1986 (in which year he also became National Allround Champion).

Hein Vergeer was a dominant allround skater, but after recovering from an injury, he was never able to reach that same level again. Because of this, he was unable to fulfil his wish of winning an Olympic medal – at the 1988 Winter Olympics in Calgary, Vergeer competed in the 500 m, the 1,000 m, and the 1,500 m, but his best result was a mere fifteenth place. He had also competed in those same three distances at the Winter Olympics in Sarajevo four years earlier, but did not do much better than with a tenth place as his best result. His best years were in between those two Winter Olympics.

Vergeer lived during his skating years in Haastrecht, a town where Leo Visser, another former World Champion speed skating, also used to live. Both skaters used to train at the skating club STV Lekstreek.

Back in the days of Vergeer's dominance, speed skating was not very lucrative, so Vergeer did what many other top skaters in those days did – he used his fame as a stepping stone to a career in marketing and communication. Vergeer currently is an advisor of several ventures and he organises events.

In 2006 and 2007, Vergeer participated in the Holiday on Ice show called Fantasy.

== Personal records ==
To put these personal records in perspective, the last column (Notes) lists the official world records on the dates that Vergeer skated his personal records.

Personal records
Men's Speed skating
| Event | Result | Date | Location | Notes |
| 500 meter | 37.79 | 14 February 1987 | Heerenveen | 36.57 |
| 1000 meter | 1:14.62 | 18 February 1988 | Calgary | 1:12.58 |
| 1500 meter | 1:53.88 | 21 March 1987 | Heerenveen | 1:52.70 |
| 3000 meter | 4:01.21 | 19 March 1987 | Heerenveen | 4:03.22 |
| 5000 meter | 6:54.91 | 15 February 1986 | Inzell | 6:49.15 |
| 10000 meter | 14:39.05 | 16 February 1986 | Inzell | 14:21.51 |
| Big combination | 161.936 | 16 February 1986 | Inzell | 160.807 |

Note that Vergeer's personal record on the 3000 meter was not a world record because Leo Visser skated 3:59.27 that same day at the same tournament. Also note that when Vergeer set his personal record on the 10000 meter Geir Karlstad set a new world record of 14:12.14 that same day at the same tournament.

Vergeer has an Adelskalender score of 161.193 points. His highest ranking on the Adelskalender was a seventh place. The Adelskalender is an all-time allround speed skating ranking.

== Tournament overview ==
| Season | Dutch Championships Allround | Dutch Championships Sprint | Dutch Championships Single Distances | European Championships Allround | Olympic Games | World Championships Allround | World Championships Sprint | World Championships Junior Allround |
|---|---|---|---|---|---|---|---|---|
| 1979–80 | | | | | | | | ASSEN 12th 500m 10th 3000m 21st 1500m 10th 5000m 12th overall |
| 1980–81 | ASSEN 8th 500m 12th 5000m 12th 1500m 10th 10000m 10th allround | | | | | | | |
| 1981–82 | HEERENVEEN (bronze) 500m 10th 5000m (bronze) 1500m 8th 10000m 7th overall | | | | | | | |
| 1982–83 | DEVENTER (bronze) 500m 11th 5000m 6th 1500m 11th 10000m 8th overall | UTRECHT (bronze) 500m 5th 1000m 4th 500m (bronze) 1000m (silver) overall | | | | | HELSINKI 10th 500m 9th 1000m 9th 500m 15th1000m 10th overall | |
| 1983–84 | | EINDHOVEN (gold) 500m (gold) 1000m (silver) 500m (gold) 1000m (gold) overall | | | SARAJEVO 13th 500m 10th 1000m 12th 1500m | | TRONDHEIM 18th 500m 11th 1000m 13th 500m 8th 1000m 11th overall | |
| 1984–85 | ALKMAAR (silver) 500m 5th 5000m (gold) 1500m 5th 10000m (silver) overall | UTRECHT (bronze) 500m (gold) 1000m 4th 500m (silver) 1000m (gold) overall | | ESKILSTUNA (gold) 500m (gold) 5000m (gold) 1500m 5th 10000m (gold) overall | | HAMAR 6th 500m (gold) 5000m (silver) 1500m 8th 10000m (gold) overall | HEERENVEEN 9th 500m 4th 1000m 13th 500m 14th 1000m 7th overall | |
| 1985–86 | ASSEN (gold) 500m (bronze) 5000m (gold) 1500m 6th 10000m (gold) overall | UTRECHT (silver) 500m (silver) 1000m (bronze) 500m (silver) overall | | OSLO (gold) 500m 7th 5000m (gold) 1500m 4th 10000m (gold) overall | | INZELL (silver) 500m 16th 5000m 18th 1500m 7th 10000m (gold) overall | KARUIZAWA (silver) 500m 16th 1000m 18th 500m 7th 1000m 16th overall | |
| 1986–87 | DEVENTER (gold) 500m (bronze) 5000m (gold) 1500m (bronze) 10000m (gold) overall | | THE HAGUE UTRECHT (silver) 1500m (gold) 5000m | TRONDHEIM (silver) 500m 5th 5000m (silver) 1500m 14th 10000m (bronze) overall | | HEERENVEEN 6th 500m 18th 5000m 6th 1500m 14th 10000m 10th overall | | |
| 1987–88 | | ALKMAAR 7th 500m (gold) 1000m 7th 500m (silver) 1000m (bronze) overall | HEERENVEEN (silver) 1000m (bronze) 1500m | THE HAGUE (silver) 500m 11th 5000m (bronze) 1500m 15th 10000m 5th overall | CALGARY 24th 500m 15th 1000m 27th 1500m | | | |

== Medals won ==
| Championship | Gold (gold) | Silver (silver) | Bronze (bronze) |
|---|---|---|---|
| Dutch Allround | 2 | 1 | 0 |
| Dutch Sprint | 2 | 2 | 1 |
| Dutch Single Distances | 1 | 2 | 1 |
| European Allround Classification | 2 | 0 | 1 |
| World Allround Classification | 2 | 0 | 0 |

== Medals ==
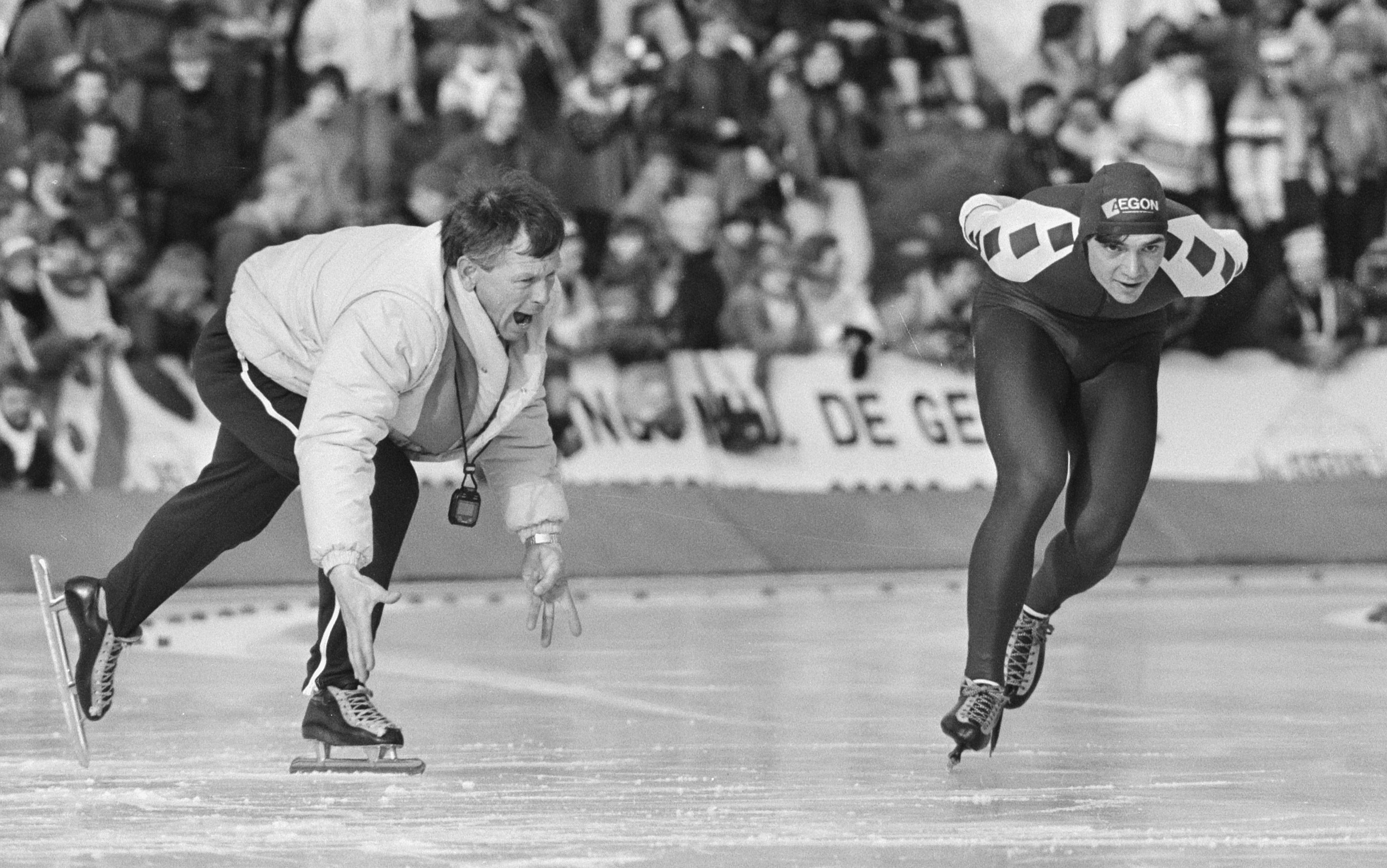
Hein Vergeer with coach Henk Gemser during a 10000 m race at the national championships in 1985.jpg

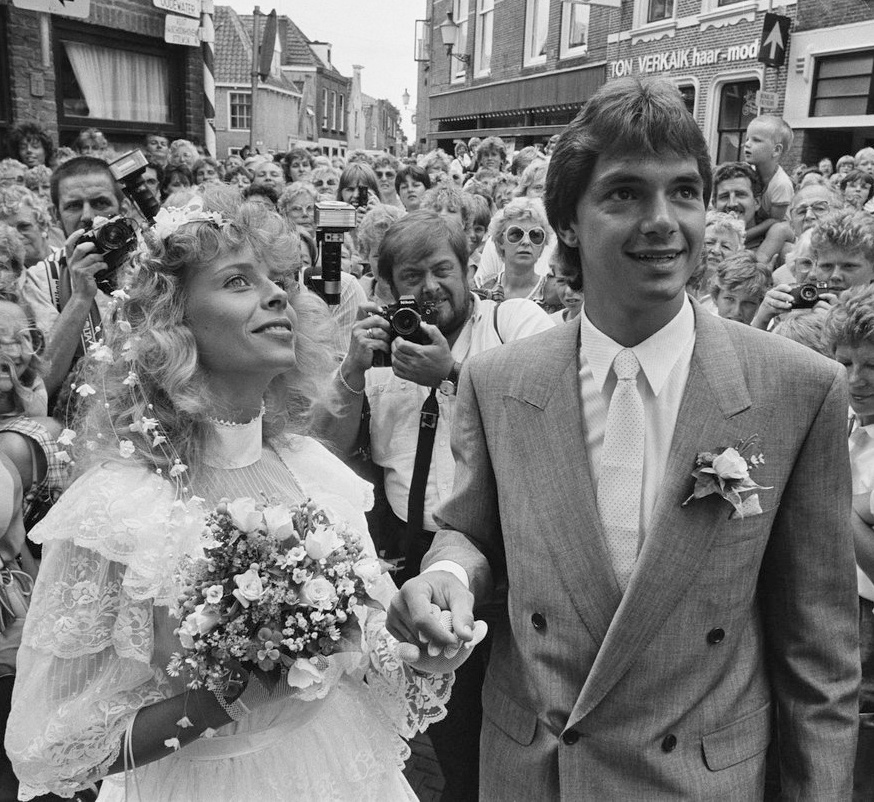
Hein Vergeer is marrying Carolien Kruisinga on 4 July 1986

An overview of medals won by Vergeer at important championships he participated in, listing the years in which he won each:

| Championship | Gold medal | Silver medal | Bronze medal |
|---|---|---|---|
| Winter Olympics | – | – | – |
| World Allround | 1985; 1986 | – | – |
| World Sprint | – | – | – |
| World Cup | – | – | 1987 (1500 m) |
| European Allround | 1985; 1986 | – | 1987 |
| Dutch Allround | 1986; 1987 | 1985 | – |
| Dutch Sprint | 1984; 1985 | 1983; 1986 | 1988 |
| Dutch Single Distance | 1987 (5000 m) | 1987 (1500 m); 1988 (1000 m) | 1988 (1500 m) |

Awards
| Preceded by (Canada) Gaétan Boucher | Oscar Mathisen Award; 1985 | Succeeded by (Norway) Geir Karlstad |
| Preceded by (Netherlands) Joop Zoetemelk | Dutch Sportsman of the Year; 1986 | Succeeded by (Netherlands) Ruud Gullit |
