= Leo Visser =

Dutch speed skater

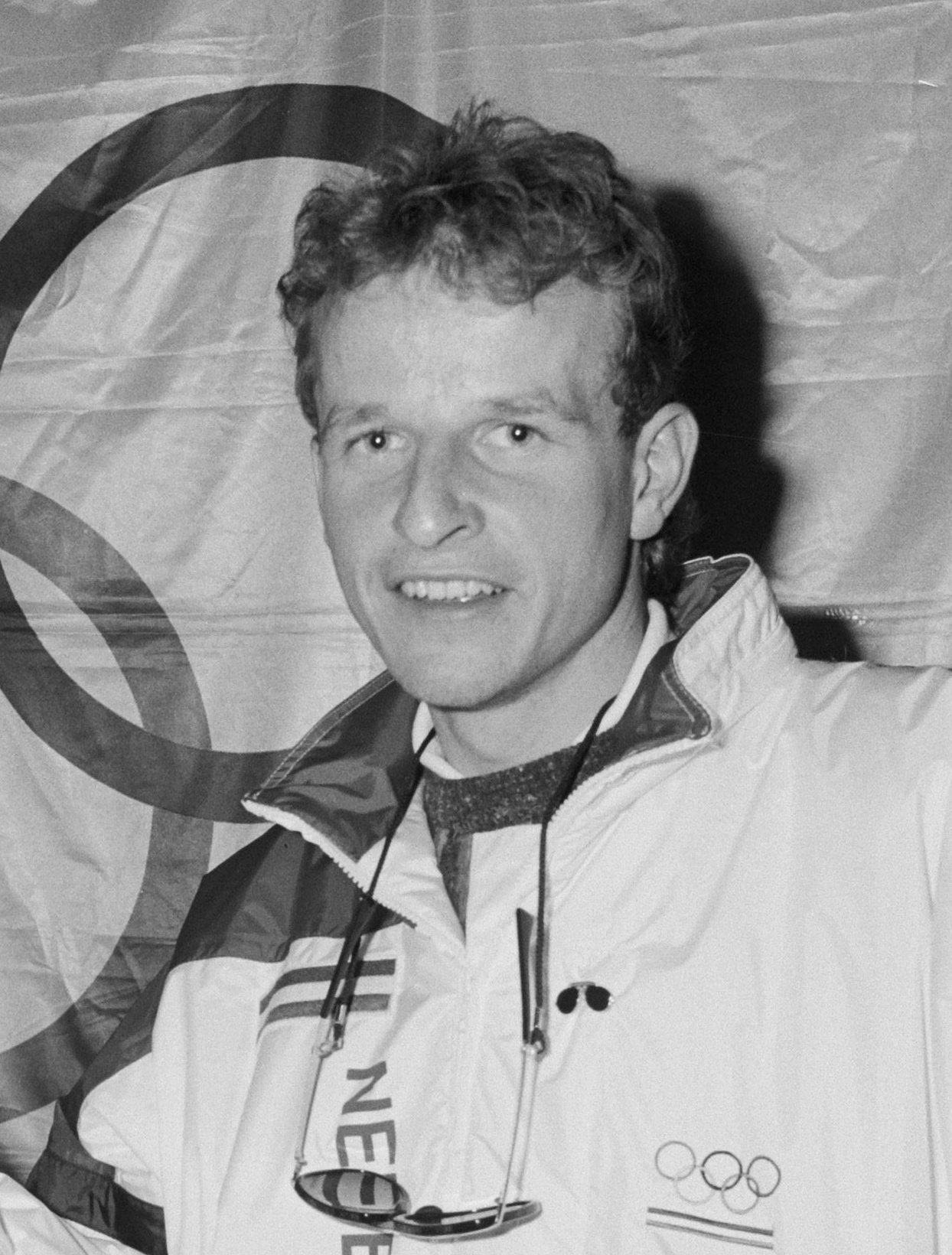
- Leo Visser in 1988

Personal information
- Full name: Leendert Visser
- Nationality: Dutch
- Born: 13 January 1966 (age 60) Haastrecht, Netherlands
- Spouse: Sandra Voetelink

Sport
- Country: Netherlands
- Sport: Speed skating
- Turned pro: 1986
- Retired: 1992

Achievements and titles
- Personal best(s): 500 m: 38.65 (1992); 1000 m: 1:16.21 (1992); 1500 m: 1:54.65 (1990); 3000 m: 3:59.27 (1987); 5000 m: 6:44.98 (1988); 10 000 m: 13:58.47 (1988)
Medal record
Representing the Netherlands
Men's Speed Skating
Olympic Games
Silver medal – second place	1988 Calgary	5,000 m
Bronze medal – third place	1988 Calgary	10,000 m
Bronze medal – third place	1992 Albertville	1,500 m
Bronze medal – third place	1992 Albertville	5,000 m
World Championships
Gold medal – first place	1989 Oslo	Allround
Silver medal – second place	1988 Alma-Ata	Allround
European Championships
Gold medal – first place	1989 Gothenburg	Allround
Silver medal – second place	1988 The Hague	Allround
Silver medal – second place	1991 Sarajevo	Allround
Bronze medal – third place	1990 Heerenveen	Allround

Leendert "Leo" Visser (born 13 January 1966) is a Dutch former speed skater, who in 1989 won the World Allround championships and European championships.

At the 1988 Olympics in Calgary he won a silver medal in the 5000 m and a bronze medal in the 10 000 meter. Four years later, at the 1992 Olympics in Albertville, Visser won a bronze medal in both the 1,500 and the 5,000 metres, behind Norwegians Johann Olav Koss and Geir Karlstad.

Nationally, he won the allround titles in 1988, 1989 and 1991, as well as four distance titles.

After his career as a speed skater, Visser became a pilot and he is now captain on the Boeing 777 for Dutch airline KLM. In 2002, he was the chef de mission for the Dutch Olympic team. His wife, Sandra Voetelink, is also a former Olympic speed skater.

== Records ==
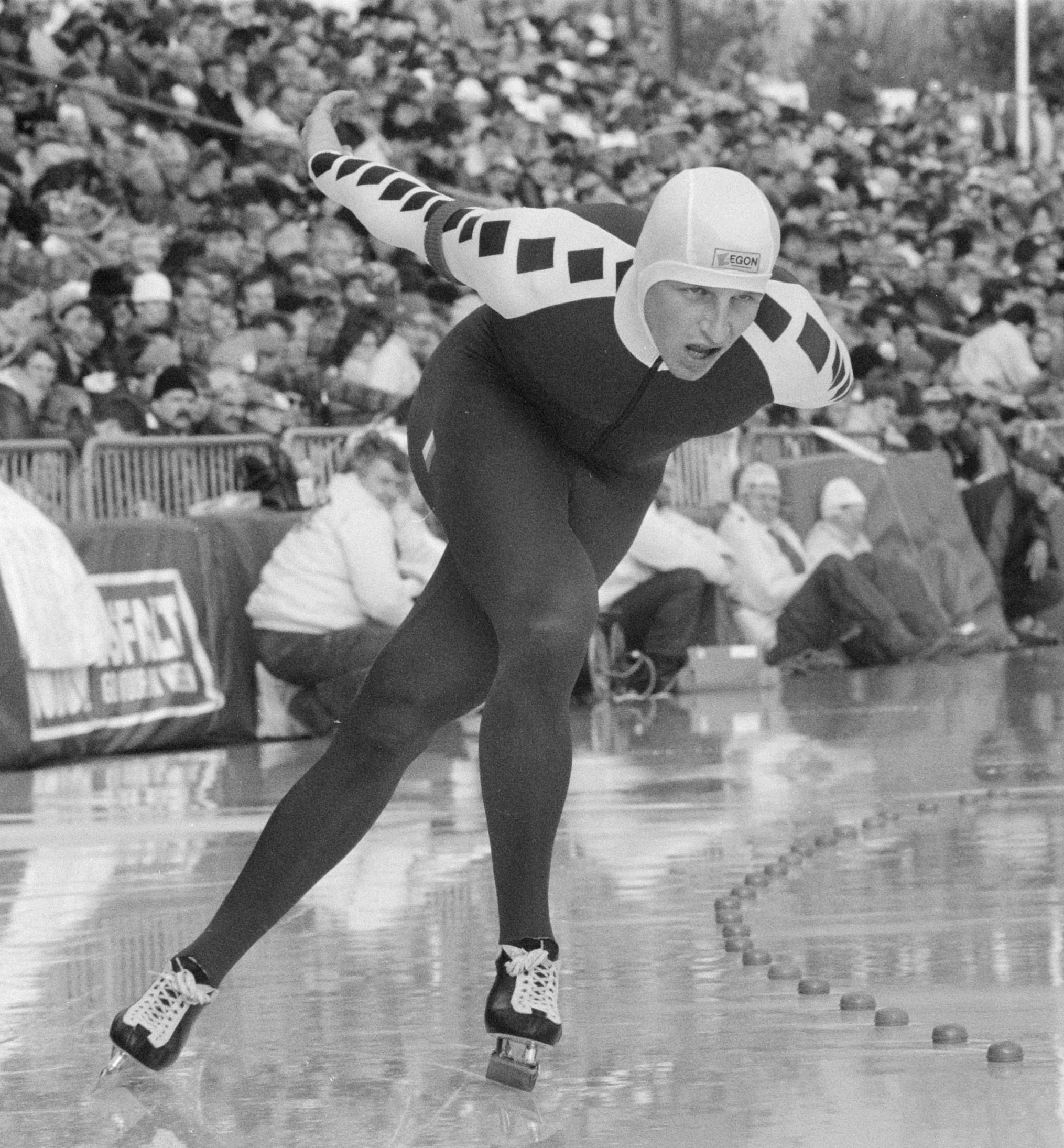
Leo Visser in 1988

=== Personal records ===
Personal records
Men's Speed skating
Event	Result	Date	Location	Notes
500 meter	38.65	31 January 1992	Davos	
1000 meter	1:16.21	2 January 1992	Heerenveen	
1500 meter	1:54.65	19 January 1990	Heerenveen	
3000 meter	3:59.27	19 March 1987	Heerenveen	
5000 meter	6:44.98	13 February 1988	Calgary	
10000 meter	13:58.47	2 January 1988	Heerenveen	

Visser has a score of 159.287 points on the Adelskalender

=== World records ===
Event	Result	Date	Location	Notes
5000 meter	6:47.01	14 February 1987	Heerenveen	
3000 meter	3:59.27	19 March 1987	Heerenveen	

== Tournament overview ==
Season	Dutch Championships Single Distances	Dutch Championships Allround	European Championships Allround	Olympic Games	World Cup	World Championships Allround
1984–1985		ALKMAAR 16th 500m 21st 5000m 15th 1500m DNQ 10000m NC overall				
1985–1986		ASSEN 7th 500m (silver) 5000m (bronze) 1500m 5th 10000m 4th overall			44th 1500m 16th 5000/10000m	INZELL 15th 500m 8th 5000m 8th 1500m 7th 10000m 8th overall
1986–1987	THE HAGUE 19th 500m (gold) 1500m (silver) 5000m (bronze) 10000m	DEVENTER 6th 500m (gold) 5000m (bronze) 1500m (gold) 10000m (bronze) overall	TRONDHEIM 12th 500m (silver) 5000m 16th 1500m (bronze) 10000m 5th overall		10th 1500m (bronze) 5000/10000m	HEERENVEEN 16th 500m (gold) 5000m 15th 1500m (silver) 10000m 4th overall
1987–1988	HEERENVEEN (gold) 1500m 20th 5000m (gold) 10000m	ALKMAAR (silver) 500m (silver) 5000m (gold) 1500m (gold) 10000m (gold) overall	THE HAGUE 4th 500m (silver) 5000m 4th 1500m 4th 10000m (silver) overall	CALGARY (silver) 5000m (bronze) 10000m	15th 1500m (bronze) 5000/10000m	ALMA ATA 15th 500m 12th 5000m 21st 1500m (gold) 10000m (silver) overall
1988–1989	HEERENVEEN (bronze) 1500m (bronze) 5000m (bronze) 10000m	THE HAGUE 9th 500m (silver) 5000m (silver) 1500m (gold) 10000m (gold) overall	GÖTEBORG 12th 500m (gold) 5000m 7th 1500m (gold) 10000m (gold) overall		28th 1500m 14th 5000/10000m	OSLO 14th 500m (gold) 5000m (gold) 1500m (silver) 10000m (gold) overall
1989–1990	HEERENVEEN 19th 500m (silver) 1500m 5th 5000m 7th 10000m	ASSEN (bronze) 500m 14th 5000m DNS 1500m DNS 10000m NC overall	HEERENVEEN 16th 500m 4th 5000m (bronze) 1500m 4th 10000m (bronze) overall			
1990–1991	THE HAGUE (gold) 1500m (silver) 5000m 4th 10000m	ALKMAAR 10th 500m (gold) 5000m (gold) 1500m (silver) 10000m (gold) overall	SARAJEVO 5th 500m (bronze) 5000m (gold) 1500m 4th 10000m (silver) overall		4th 1500m (silver) 5000/10000m	HEERENVEEN 10th 500m 5th 5000m 5th 1500m (bronze) 10000m 4th overall
1991–1992	HEERENVEEN (silver) 1000m (silver) 1500m (silver) 5000m			ALBERTVILLE (bronze) 1500m (bronze) 5000m	20th 1500m	

== Medals won ==
Championship	Gold (gold)	Silver (silver)	Bronze (bronze)
Dutch Single Distances	4	6	4
Dutch Allround	3	0	1
European Allround	1	2	1
Olympic Games	0	1	3
World Cup	0	1	2
World Allround	1	1	0

Source: SpeedSkatingStats.com

Awards
Preceded by (Netherlands) Steven Rooks	Dutch Sportsman of the Year; 1989	Succeeded by (Netherlands) Erik Breukink
Preceded by (Sweden) Tomas Gustafson	Oscar Mathisen Award; 1989	Succeeded by (Norway) Johann Olav Koss
Olympic Games
Preceded by Jan Ykema	Flagbearer for Netherlands; Albertville 1992	Succeeded by Christine Aaftink
