= Hansjörg Baltes =

German speed skater

Personal information
- Nationality: German
- Born: 11 August 1964 (age 60); Munich, West Germany

Sport
- Sport: Speed skating

Hansjörg Baltes (born 11 August 1964) is a German speed skater. He competed at the 1984 Winter Olympics and the 1988 Winter Olympics.
