= Johann Olav Koss =

Norwegian speed skater (born 1968)

Johann Olav Koss CM, OLY
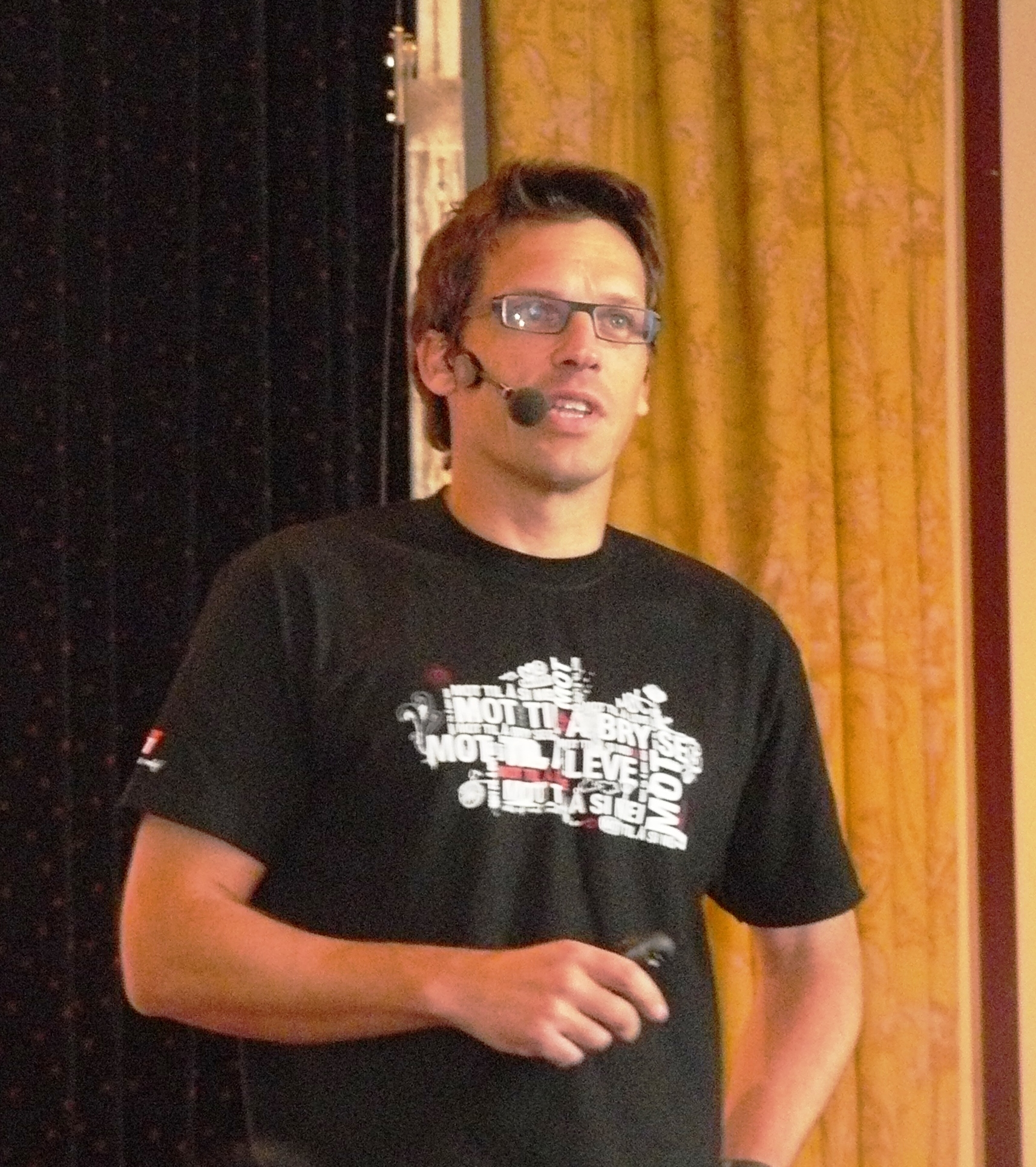
- Koss in 2007

Personal information
- Born: 29 October 1968 (age 57) Drammen, Norway
- Height: 1.89 m (6 ft 2 1/2 in)
- Weight: 77 kg (170 lb)

Sport
- Country: Norway
- Sport: Speed skating
- Turned pro: 1986
- Retired: 1994

Achievements and titles
- Personal bests: 500 m: 37.98 (1994); 1000 m: 1:14.9 (1993); 1500 m: 1:51.29 (1994); 3000 m: 3:57.52 (1990); 5000 m: 6:34.96 (1994); 10 000 m: 13:30.55 (1994)
Medal record
Men's speed skating
Representing Norway
Winter Olympics
Gold medal – first place	1992 Albertville	1,500 m
Gold medal – first place	1994 Lillehammer	1,500 m
Gold medal – first place	1994 Lillehammer	5,000 m
Gold medal – first place	1994 Lillehammer	10,000 m
Silver medal – second place	1992 Albertville	10,000 m

Johann Olav Koss (born 29 October 1968) is a former speed skater from Norway. He won four Olympic gold medals, including three at the 1994 Winter Olympics in his home country.

== Biography ==
Johann Olav Koss was born in Drammen, Buskerud County, Norway. Koss became the Norwegian Junior Champion in 1987, but he could not compete with the world top skaters in the 1986 and 1987 World Junior Championships. In 1988, he debuted with the seniors at the World Championships in Alma-Ata, but failed to qualify for the final distance. The following year, he finished eighth in the same tournament (after a fifteenth place in the European Allround Championships), placing second on the 1,500 m. His breakthrough came in 1990, winning the World Allround Championships in Innsbruck, Austria. The following four years, he would win two more world titles (1991 and 1994), while finishing second in 1993 and third in 1992. He won the European Allround Championships in 1991 and finished second in the next three editions. Koss had a total of twenty-three World Cup wins, while winning four overall World Cup titles (the 1,500 m in 1990 and 1991, and the combined 5,000/10,000 m in 1991 and 1994).

Koss made his Olympic debut at the 1992 Winter Olympics, finishing seventh on the 5,000 m, five days after undergoing surgery because of an inflamed pancreas. He would recover to win gold on the 1,500 m (by only 0.04 seconds over his countryman Ådne Søndrål) and silver on the 10,000 m (behind Dutch skater Bart Veldkamp).

In 1994, the final year of his speed skating career, Koss also gained fame outside the speed skating world by winning three gold medals at the 1994 Winter Olympics in his native Norway, winning all races in new world records, two of which would remain unbeaten until the clap skate era. For his performance, he was named Sports Illustrated magazine's Sportsman of the Year in 1994, together with Bonnie Blair. In addition, he received the Oscar Mathisen Award three times: in 1990, 1991, and 1994.

After his speed skating career, Koss trained as a physician at the University of Queensland in Australia. He became a UNICEF ambassador and a member of the International Olympic Committee (until 2002). He married Canadian businessperson and politician Belinda Stronach on 31 December 1999, but they divorced in 2003.

in 2000, Koss founded the Canadian-based International Humanitarian Organisation, Right To Play, which uses sport and play as a tool for the development of children and youth in the most disadvantaged areas of the world. The organization operates in more than 20 countries reaching over one million children each week and is supported by more than 620 staff worldwide and over 14,900 volunteer coaches. In August 2015, Koss transitioned into the role of founder at Right To Play, where he still stays very active in a variety of fundraising initiatives, and where he maintains his seat on the International Board of Directors.

He married his second wife, Jennifer Lee, in New York on 23 May 2009. Lee's friend Chelsea Clinton was one of the bridesmaids. Lee is a Harvard College, University of Oxford, and Harvard Business School graduate, and a former cellist who studied at The Juilliard School. She is the granddaughter of Kim Chung Yul, the former Prime Minister of South Korea and Chief of the Korean Armed Forces during the Korean War. She is the co-founder of a retail business called BRIKA which sells products from under-the-radar artisans and makers. Lee is a former management consultant and most recently a private equity investment professional at Ontario Teachers' Private Capital in Toronto. They have four children together, Aksel, Annabelle, Andreas and Aleksander.

In November 2009, after American Peter Mueller was stripped of his coaching role with Norway for an inappropriate comment to a female team member, Koss was appointed head coach, despite no previous coaching experience. Association sporting director Oystein Haugen told Reuters that Koss has been a revelation despite no previous coaching experience.

Koss completed his Executive MBA at the Joseph L. Rotman School of Management in the University of Toronto in Canada. He has Honorary Doctorates from several universities - Brock University, University of Calgary, Vrije Universiteit Brussels, and the University of Agder in Norway. In July 2015, Koss was made an Honorary Member of the Order of Canada (CM).

At the 2018 Olympic Games Koss was inducted into the Olympians for Life project for using sport to make a better world.

== Controversy regarding medical advice ==
In later years, Koss's medical guidance during his peak years came under scrutiny following the release of the 2012 documentary When Heroes Lie (Finnish: Sinivalkoinen valhe), directed by Arto Halonen. The film alleged that Koss was among several elite Norwegian athletes who received medical advice from the controversial Italian physician Francesco Conconi in the early 1990s. Conconi was later linked to the systematic introduction of EPO in professional sports.

Koss confirmed he had visited Conconi but maintained that the visits were strictly for physiological testing and training optimization. He has consistently and firmly denied any allegations of doping, calling the claims in the documentary "absurd" and "groundless." While no physical evidence has ever surfaced to prove he used performance-enhancing drugs, the documentary sparked significant debate due to the unprecedented nature of his 1994 Olympic performances. At the 1994 Winter Olympics, Koss famously lowered his own world record in the 10,000m by nearly 13 seconds. His decision to retire from the sport that same year at the age of 25 has also been a subject of retrospective discussion, although Koss maintained he left to pursue his medical studies and humanitarian work.

== Medals ==
An overview of medals won by Koss at important championships he participated in, listing the years in which he won each:

Championships	Gold medal	Silver medal	Bronze medal
Winter Olympics	1992 (1,500 m); 1994 (1,500 m); 1994 (5,000 m); 1994 (10,000 m)	1992 (10,000 m)	–
World Allround	1990; 1991; 1994	1993	1992
World Cup	1990 (1,500 m); 1991 (1,500 m); 1991 (5,000 m / 10,000 m); 1994 (5,000 m / 10,000 m)	1992 (1,500 m); 1992 (5,000 m / 10,000 m); 1993 (5,000 m / 10,000 m)	1990 (5,000 m / 10,000 m)
European Allround	1991	1992; 1993; 1994	–
Norwegian Allround	1991; 1992; 1993; 1994	1989; 1990	–
Norwegian Single Distance	1989 (1,500 m); 1989 (5,000 m); 1990 (1,500 m); 1990 (5,000 m); 1990 (10,000 m); 1991 (1,500 m); 1991 (5,000 m); 1991 (10,000 m); 1993 (1,000 m); 1993 (5,000 m); 1994 (1,500 m)	1989 (1,000 m); 1990 (1,000 m); 1992 (1,000 m); 1992 (5,000 m)	1988 (10,000 m); 1991 (1,000 m); 1992 (1,500 m); 1994 (5,000 m)
Norwegian Marathon	–	1988	–

== Records ==
=== World records ===
Koss skated ten world records:

Event	Time	Date	Venue
3000 m	3.57,52	13 March 1990	Heerenveen
5000 m	6.41,73	9 February 1991	Heerenveen
10,000 m	13.43,54	10 February 1991	Heerenveen
Big combination	157.396	10 February 1991	Heerenveen
5000 m	6.38,77	22 January 1993	Heerenveen
5000 m	6.36,57	13 March 1993	Heerenveen
5000 m	6.35,53	4 December 1993	Hamar
5000 m	6.34,96	13 February 1994	Hamar
1500 m	1.51,29	16 February 1994	Hamar
10,000 m	13.30,55	20 February 1994	Hamar

Source: SpeedSkatingStats.com

=== Personal records ===
To put these personal records in perspective, the WR column lists the official world records on the dates that Koss skated his personal records.

Event	Result	Date	Venue	WR
500 m	37.98	7 January 1994	Hamar	35.92
1,000 m	1:14.9	10 January 1993	Hamar	1:12.58
1,500 m	1:51.29	16 February 1994	Hamar	1:51.60
3,000 m	3:57.52	13 March 1990	Heerenveen	3:59.27
5,000 m	6:34.96	13 February 1994	Hamar	6:35.53
10,000 m	13:30.55	20 February 1994	Hamar	13:43.54
Big combination	157.257	9 January 1994	Hamar	156.882

Source: SpeedskatingResults.com

Koss was number one on the Adelskalender, the all-time allround speed skating ranking, for a total of 1,998 days, divided over three periods between 1992 and 1997. He has an Adelskalender score of 155.099 points.

== See also ==
- List of multiple Olympic gold medalists at a single Games

== Other sources ==
- Eng, Trond. All Time International Championships, Complete Results: 1889 - 2002. Askim, Norway: WSSSA-Skøytenytt, 2002.
- Eng, Trond; Gjerde, Arild and Teigen, Magne. Norsk Skøytestatistikk Gjennom Tidene, Menn/Kvinner, 1999 (6. utgave). Askim/Skedsmokorset/Veggli, Norway: WSSSA-Skøytenytt, 1999.
- Eng, Trond; Gjerde, Arild; Teigen, Magne and Teigen, Thorleiv. Norsk Skøytestatistikk Gjennom Tidene, Menn/Kvinner, 2004 (7. utgave). Askim/Skedsmokorset/Veggli/Hokksund, Norway: WSSSA-Skøytenytt, 2004.
- Eng, Trond and Teigen, Magne. Komplette Resultater fra offisielle Norske Mesterskap på skøyter, 1894 - 2005. Askim/Veggli, Norway: WSSSA-Skøytenytt, 2005.
- Teigen, Magne. Komplette Resultater Norske Mesterskap På Skøyter, 1887 - 1989: Menn/Kvinner, Senior/Junior. Veggli, Norway: WSSSA-Skøytenytt, 1989.
- Teigen, Magne. Komplette Resultater Internasjonale Mesterskap 1889 - 1989: Menn/Kvinner, Senior/Junior, allround/sprint. Veggli, Norway: WSSSA-Skøytenytt, 1989.

Awards and achievements
Preceded by (Netherlands) Leo Visser	Oscar Mathisen Award; 1990–1991	Succeeded by (United States) Bonnie Blair
Preceded by (Netherlands) Falko Zandstra	Oscar Mathisen Award; 1994	Succeeded by (Germany) Gunda Niemann
Preceded by (Spain) Miguel Indurain	United Press International; Athlete of the Year; 1994	Succeeded by (United Kingdom) Jonathan Edwards
Preceded by (Norway) Atle Skårdal	Norwegian Sportsperson of the Year; 1991	Succeeded by (Norway) Vegard Ulvang
Preceded by Norway national football team	Norwegian Sportsperson of the Year; 1994	Succeeded by (Norway) Bjørn Dæhlie
