= Dave Silk (speed skater) =

American speed skater

David William Silk (Butte, Montana, October 18, 1965) is a former all-round speed skater from the United States who was active from 1983 to 1990. He finished third at the 1988 World Allround Speed Skating Championships and was a World Cup winner in 1985–86 in the 5,000/10,000 category. He competed in three events at the 1988 Winter Olympics.
