= Werner Jäger =

Austrian speed skater

Werner Jäger (born September 3, 1959) is a former ice speed skater from Austria, who represented his native country at the 1984 Winter Olympics in Sarajevo, Yugoslavia
