= Joakim Karlberg =

Swedish speed skater (born 1964)

Personal information
- Nationality: Swedish
- Born: 18 March 1964 (age 62) Gothenburg, Sweden

Sport
- Sport: Speed skating

Joakim Karlberg (born 18 March 1964) is a Swedish speed skater. He competed at the 1988 Winter Olympics and the 1992 Winter Olympics.
