= Geir Karlstad =

Norwegian speed skater

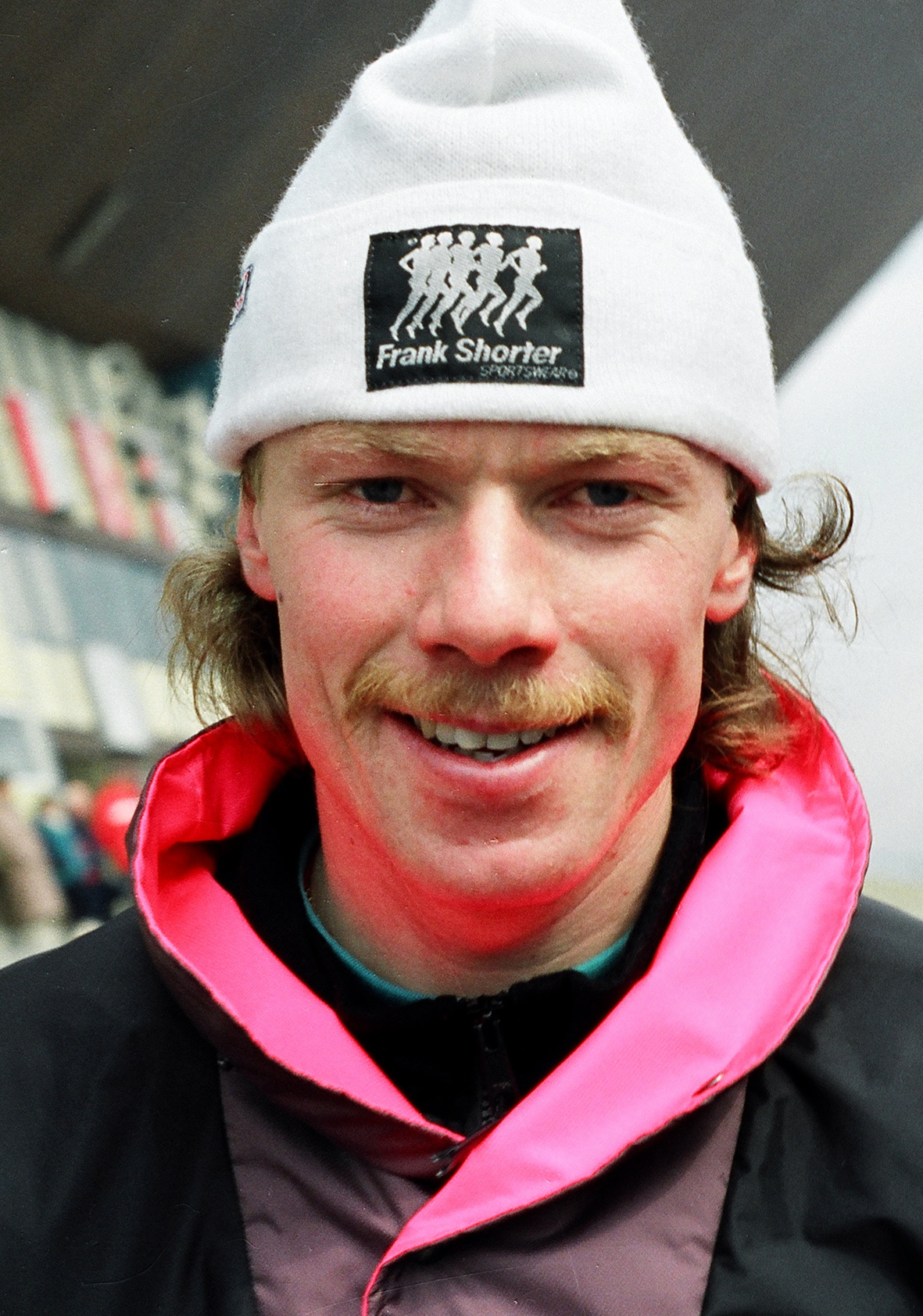
- Geir Karlstad

Personal information
- Nationality: Norwegian
- Born: 7 July 1963 (age 63) Skedsmo Municipality, Akershus, Norway
- Height: 1.90 m (6 ft 3 in)
- Weight: 80 kg (176 lb)

Sport
- Country: Norway
- Sport: Speed skating
- Club: SK Ceres (1972/73–1981/82); Ask SK (1982/83–1986/87); Lillestrøm SK (1987/88–1991/92)
- Turned pro: 1981
- Retired: 1992

Achievements and titles
- Personal bests: 500 m: 39.41 (1992); 1000 m: 1:22.5 (1981); 1500 m: 1:55.24 (1992); 3000 m: 3:59.78 (1987); 5000 m: 6:43.59 (1987); 10 000 m: 13:48.29 (1992)
Medal record
Men's speed skating
Olympic Games
Gold medal – first place	1992 Albertville	5,000 m
Bronze medal – third place	1992 Albertville	10,000 m
World Allround
Bronze medal – third place	1989 Oslo	Allround
European Allround
Bronze medal – third place	1989 Gothenburg	Allround
World Junior
Gold medal – first place	1982 Innsbruck	Allround
Norwegian Allround
Gold medal – first place	1989 Hundorp	Allround
Gold medal – first place	1990 Verdal	Allround
Silver medal – second place	1985 Trondheim	Allround
Silver medal – second place	1986 Jevnaker	Allround
Silver medal – second place	1988 Oslo	Allround
Silver medal – second place	1991 Hol/Gol	Allround
Silver medal – second place	1992 Savalen	Allround
Norwegian Single Distances
Gold medal – first place	1987 Stavanger	5,000 m
Gold medal – first place	1987 Stavanger	10,000 m
Gold medal – first place	1988 Hundorp	5,000 m
Gold medal – first place	1992 Trondheim	5,000 m
Silver medal – second place	1987 Stavanger	1,500 m
Silver medal – second place	1990 Brandbu	1,500 m
Silver medal – second place	1990 Brandbu	5,000 m

Geir Karlstad (born 7 July 1963) is a Norwegian former speed skater and national team speed skating coach.

== Biography ==
Although best at the longest distances (the 5,000 m and the 10,000 m), Geir Karlstad became Junior World Allround Champion in 1982 and, as a senior, won bronze in both the World and European Allround Championships in 1989. Among the dominating speed skaters in the 1980s, Karlstad competed at the 1984 and 1988 Winter Olympics, winning no medals. At the 1992 Winter Olympics in Albertville, he won the gold medal on the 5,000 m and the bronze on the 10,000 m while skating for Lillestrøm SK. He also represented Aktiv SK, but in his youth he represented SK Ceres.

A severe back injury forced him to end his career before the 1994 Winter Olympics of Lillehammer held in his homeland. He had originally intended to end his career at those Winter Olympics. From 1998 to 2002, he was the national team coach of the Norwegian speed skating team. Karlstad received the Oscar Mathisen Award in 1986.

== Medals ==
An overview of medals won by Karlstad at important championships he participated in, listing the years in which he won each:

Championships	Gold medal	Silver medal	Bronze medal
Winter Olympics	1992 (5,000 m)	–	1992 (10,000 m)
World Allround	–	–	1989
European Allround	–	–	1989
Norwegian Allround	1989; 1990	1985; 1986; 1988; 1991; 1992	–
Norwegian Single Distance	1987 (5,000 m); 1987 (10,000 m); 1988 (5,000 m); 1992 (5,000 m)	1987 (1,500 m); 1990 (1,500 m); 1990 (5,000 m)	–

== Records ==
=== World records ===
Over the course of his career, Karlstad set five world records:

Discipline	Time	Date	Location
10,000 m	14.12,14	16 February 1986	Inzell
10,000 m	14.03,92	15 February 1987	Heerenveen
5,000 m	6.45,44	22 November 1987	Heerenveen
5,000 m	6.43,59	4 December 1987	Calgary
10,000 m	13.48,51	6 December 1987	Calgary

Source: SpeedSkatingStats.com

=== Personal records ===
To put these personal records in perspective, the WR column lists the official world records on the dates that Karlstad skated his personal records.

Event	Result	Date	Venue	WR
500 m	39.41	17 January 1992	Heerenveen	36.45
1,000 m	1:22.5	25 January 1981	Notodden	1:13.60
1,500 m	1:55.24	22 March 1992	Calgary	1:52.06
3,000 m	3:59.78	19 March 1987	Heerenveen	4:03.22
5,000 m	6:43.59	4 December 1987	Calgary	6:45.44
10,000 m	13:48.29	19 January 1992	Heerenveen	13:43.54
Big combination	160.189	19 January 1992	Heerenveen	157.396

Karlstad's personal record on the 3,000 m was not a world record because Leo Visser skated 3:59.27 at the same tournament.

Karlstad has an Adelskalender score of 159.596 points. His highest ranking on the Adelskalender was seventh place.

Awards
Preceded by (Netherlands) Hein Vergeer	Oscar Mathisen Award; 1986	Succeeded by (Soviet Union) Nikolay Gulyayev
