= Michael Hadschieff =

Austrian speed skater

Personal information
- Full name: Michael Florian Hadschieff
- Nationality: Austrian
- Born: October 5, 1963 (age 62) Innsbruck, Austria
- Years active: 1983–1994
- Height: 1.85 m (6 ft 1 in)
- Weight: 75 kg (165 lb)

Sport
- Country: Austria
- Sport: Speed skating
- Turned pro: 1981
- Coached by: Werner Jäger
- Retired: 1994

Achievements and titles
- Personal best(s): 500 m: 37.85 (1989); 1000 m: 1.13.84 (1988); 1500 m: 1:52.31 (1988); 3000 m: 3:59.42 (1987); 5000 m: 6:47.93 (1987); 10 000 m: 13:56.11 (1988)
Medal record
Men's speed skating
Representing Austria
Olympic Games
Bronze medal – third place	1988 Calgary	1,500 m
Silver medal – second place	1988 Calgary	10,000 m

Michael Florian Hadschieff (born 5 October 1963) is a former speed skater from Austria.

== Biography ==
At the 1988 Winter Olympics in Calgary, Michael Hadschieff participated in all five distances (500 m - 1,000 m - 1,500 m - 5,000 m - 10,000 m), winning medals in two of those. This performance earned him the first place in the Adelskalender, the all-time allround speed skating ranking, taking over first place from Nikolay Gulyayev. Only three days later, he lost this first place to Eric Flaim.

Hadschieff won two World Cups: On the 1,500 m in 1986 and on the 1,000 m in 1989. His second win was a first place shared with Eric Flaim. Other notable results include winning silver at the European Allround Championships and bronze at the World Allround Championships, both in 1987.

Hadschieff was awarded the Austrian Sportler des Jahres ("Sportsman of the Year") title in 1986.

== Personal records ==
Event	Result	Date	Venue
500 m	37.85	26 February 1989	Heerenveen
1,000 m	1:13.84	18 February 1988	Calgary
1,500 m	1:52.31	20 February 1988	Calgary
3,000 m	3:59.42	19 March 1987	Heerenveen
5,000 m	6:47.93	4 December 1987	Calgary
10,000 m	13:56.11	21 February 1988	Calgary
Big combination	160.567	15 February 1987	Heerenveen

Hadschieff has an Adelskalender score of 157.884 points. His highest ranking on the Adelskalender was a first place.
