= Eric Flaim =

American speed skater (born 1967)

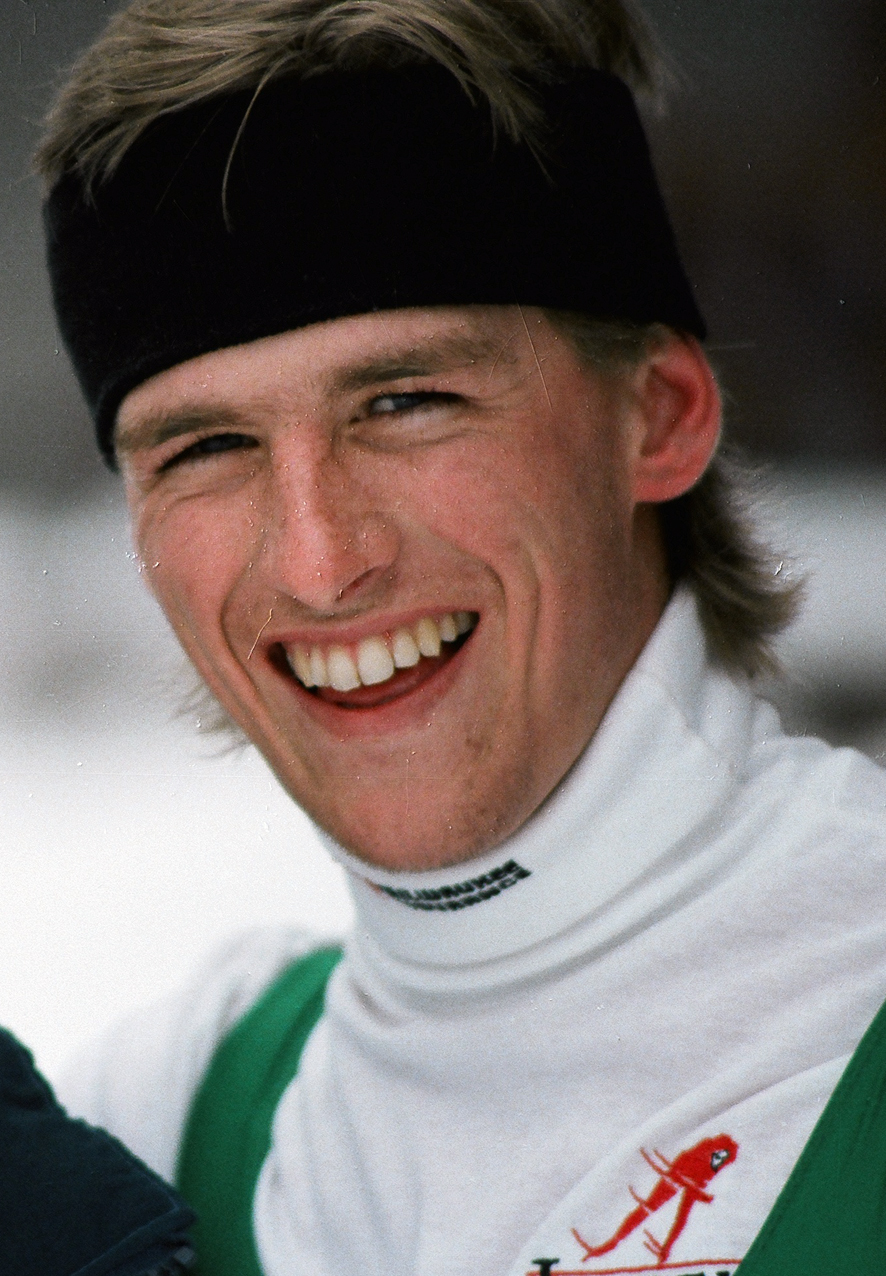

Personal information
- Full name: Eric Joseph Flaim
- Born: March 9, 1967 (age 59) Pembroke, Massachusetts, U.S.
- Height: 173 cm (5 ft 8 in)
- Weight: 73 kg (161 lb)

Sport
- Country: United States
- Sport: Speed skating Short track speed skating

Achievements and titles
- Personal bests: 500 m: 36.98 (1988); 1000 m: 1:13.53 (1988); 1500 m: 1:52.12 (1988); 3000 m: 4:02.64 (1988); 5000 m: 6:47.09 (1988); 10 000 m: 14:05.57 (1988)
Medal record
Representing the United States
Men's speed skating
Olympic Games
Silver medal – second place	1988 Calgary	1500 m
World Allround Championships
Gold medal – first place	1988 Alma-Ata	Allround
World Sprint Championships
Bronze medal – third place	1988 West Allis	Sprint
Men's short track speed skating
Olympic Games
Silver medal – second place	1994 Lillehammer	5000 m relay
World Championships
Silver medal – second place	1995 Gjøvik	1500 m
World Team Championships
Bronze medal – third place	1995 Zoetermeer	Team

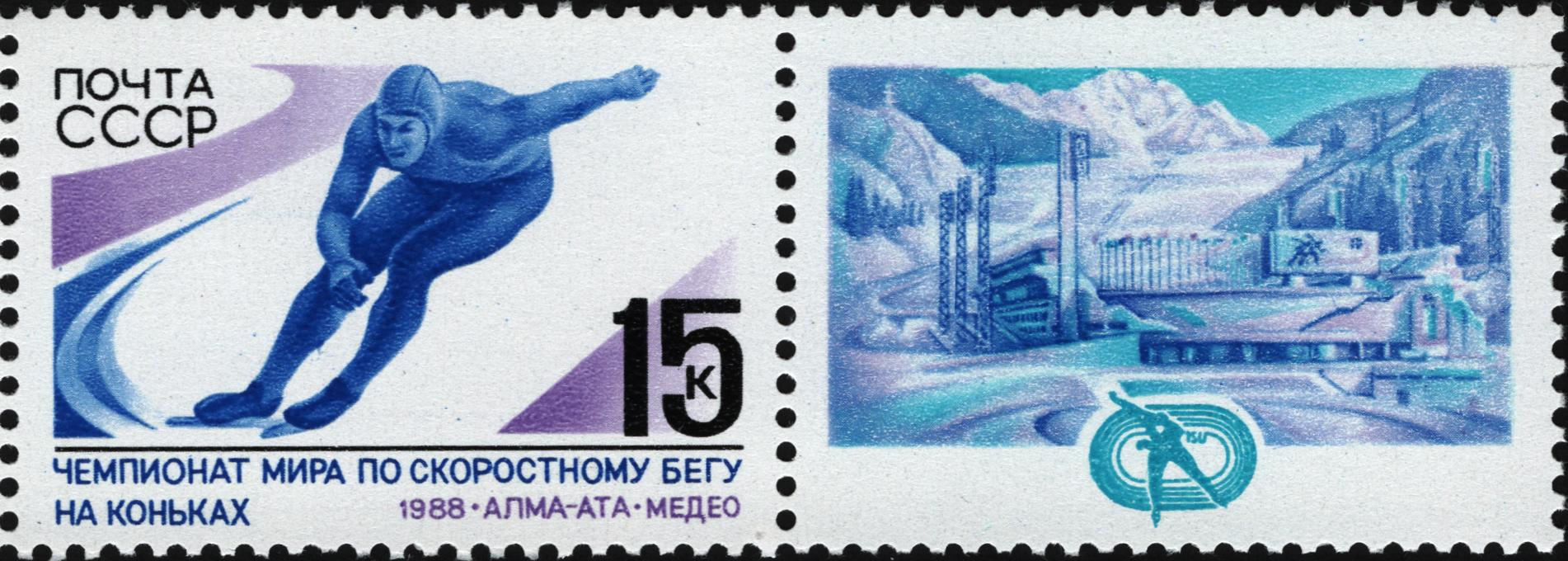
A Soviet stamp commemorating the World Allround Speed Skating Championships of 1988, in which Eric Flaim was victorious

Eric Joseph Flaim (born March 9, 1967) is an American former speed skater. He became a world champion in 1988, as well as capturing Olympic silver medals, namely in speed skating at the 1988 Winter Olympics and in short track speed skating at the 1994 Winter Olympics.

== Biography and Olympic career ==
Flaim was born in Pembroke, Massachusetts. He began skating at the age of five on a small pond next to his home on Fairwood Drive, Pembroke. He soon starting playing youth ice hockey in his hometown at the Hobomock Arena, later joining travel teams always with the encouragement and support of his father Enrico. His first introduction to the sport started in short track speed skating with the Baystate Speed Skating Club. At 11 years of age in 1979, he pursued both hockey and speed skating for two seasons. Watching the 1980 Winter Olympics in Lake Placid and Eric Heiden's astonishing five-gold-medal achievement fueled Flaim's own dream of competing for the U.S. in the Winter Olympics, and he focused on speed skating. After the 1983 season and winning both North American titles for juniors in short track and long track speed skating, he decided to fully pursue long track as short track was not yet an official Olympic sport. In his first major international competition, the Junior World Allround Championships, he placed in the top 30, he competed in two. As a senior, he participated in his first World Allround Championships in 1987 in Heerenveen, Netherlands. He finished 17th, failing to qualify for the final distance (the 10,000 m) by just one position.

In 1988, Flaim had his worst season. In front of a Milwaukee crowd, he won a 1000m gold medal and bronze overall at the World Sprint Championships. Two weeks later, at the 1988 Winter Olympics in Calgary, Flaim missed medals, placing fourth three times. In his favorite distance he had the disadvantage of starting in the first pair on the 1,500 m and immediately broke Igor Zhelezovski's world record. This was a surprise, as the 20-year-old was not regarded as a leading contender. It would not be the new world record, though, because two pairs later, East German skater André Hoffmann set an even faster time, by just .06 of a second. Flaim's time, however, would remain the second fastest 1,500 m time and so he earned Olympic silver. A highlight for Flaim's career came two weeks later when, in Alma-Ata – then a part of the Soviet Union – he became World Allround Champion at the high-altitude Medeu stadium. Despite poor outdoor conditions, he skated the best 10,000m of his career to solidify his championship.

In 1989, Flaim won the 1,000 m World Cup, a first-place overall finish shared with Austrian skater Michael Hadschieff. After that season he underwent knee surgery in early 1990 and began extensive therapy to get back into elite condition. In 1992, he seemed to be on his way to a comeback when he finished first in Davos, Switzerland, one of the eight 1,000 m races to determine the 1,000 m World Cup, two weeks prior to the start of the Olympics. During the 1992 Winter Olympics in Albertville, after a 6th place in the 5,000 m, a case of food-poisoning the evening before his 1,500 m race ruined his chances for the rest of the Olympics.

At the 1994 Winter Olympics, he won his second Olympic silver medal – this time in short track skating – as part of the United States team in the 5,000 m relay. This made him the first skater to win Olympic medals in two different winter disciplines (though not the first skater to win Olympic medals in two different overall disciplines – that honor goes to Christa Luding-Rothenburger). Flaim participated in his fourth and final Olympics during the 1998 Winter Olympics in Nagano, having been elected by his Olympic peers to carry the flag into the opening ceremonies.

=== Personal records ===
Distance	Time	Date	Location
500 m	36.98	January 23, 1988	Calgary
1,000 m	1:13.53	February 18, 1988	Calgary
1,500 m	1:52.12	February 20, 1988	Calgary
3,000 m	4:02.64	December 11, 1988	Calgary
5,000 m	6:47.09	February 17, 1988	Calgary
10,000 m	14:05.57	February 21, 1988	Calgary
Big combination	160.219	March 22, 1992	Calgary

Flaim was number one on the Adelskalender, the all-time allround speed skating ranking, from February 17, 1988, to March 21, 1992, a total of 1,494 days, which is almost exactly equal to Eric Heiden's reign length of 1,495 days. Flaim's Adelskalender score is 157.340 points.

== Personal life ==
Flaim currently is the Managing Director of a Registered Independent Investment practice; Estate Planners of New Hampshire www.epne.net. Father of Colby Flaim, Camden Flaim, and Sydney Flaim.

Olympic Games
Preceded by Bruce Baumgartner	Flagbearer for United States; Nagano 1998	Succeeded by Cliff Meidl
