= Speed skating at the 1984 Winter Olympics – Women's 1000 metres =

Women's 1000 metres at the XIV Olympic Winter Games
- Pictogram for speed skating
- Venue: Zetra Ice Rink
- Dates: February 13, 1984
- Competitors: 38 from 17 nations
- Winning time: 1:21.61 OR

Medalists
1st place, gold medalist(s)		Karin Enke; East Germany
2nd place, silver medalist(s)		Andrea Schöne; East Germany
3rd place, bronze medalist(s)		Nataliya Petrusyova; Soviet Union

The women's 1000 metres in speed skating at the 1984 Winter Olympics took place on 13 February, at the Zetra Ice Rink.

== Records ==
Prior to this competition, the existing world and Olympic records were as follows:

World record	Nataliya Petrusyova (URS)	1:19.31	Alma-Ata, Kazakh SSR, Soviet Union	26 March 1983
Olympic record	Nataliya Petrusyova (URS)	1:24.10	Lake Placid, United States	17 February 1980

The following new Olympic record was set.

Date	Athlete	Time	OR	WR
13 February	Karin Enke (GDR)	1:21.61	OR	

== Results ==
Rank	Athlete	Country	Time	Behind	Notes
1st place, gold medalist(s)	Karin Enke	East Germany	1:21.61	–	OR
2nd place, silver medalist(s)	Andrea Schöne	East Germany	1:22.83	+1.22	
3rd place, bronze medalist(s)	Nataliya Petrusyova	Soviet Union	1:23.21	+1.60	
4	Valentina Lalenkova	Soviet Union	1:23.68	+2.07	
5	Christa Rothenburger	East Germany	1:23.98	+2.37	
6	Yvonne van Gennip	Netherlands	1:25.36	+3.75	
7	Erwina Ryś-Ferens	Poland	1:25.81	+4.20	
8	Monika Pflug	West Germany	1:25.87	+4.26	
9	Annette Carlén	Sweden	1:26.15	+4.54	
10	Lilianna Morawiec	Poland	1:26.53	+4.92	
11	Silvia Brunner	Switzerland	1:26.61	+5.00	
12	Seiko Hashimoto	Japan	1:26.69	+5.08	
13	Lydia Stephans	United States	1:26.73	+5.12	
14	Zofia Tokarczyk	Poland	1:26.95	+5.34	
15	Sigrid Smuda	West Germany	1:27.05	+5.44	
16	Bjørg Eva Jensen	Norway	1:27.08	+5.47	
17	Katie Class	United States	1:27.57	+5.96	
18	Natalie Grenier	Canada	1:27.67	+6.06	
19	Pak Gum-hyon	North Korea	1:27.86	+6.25	
20	Edel Therese Høiseth	Norway	1:27.90	+6.29	
21	Thea Limbach	Netherlands	1:28.12	+6.51	
22	Shoko Fusano	Japan	1:28.19	+6.58	
23	Alie Boorsma	Netherlands	1:28.40	+6.79	
24	Mary Docter	United States	1:28.55	+6.94	
25	Sylvie Daigle	Canada	1:28.96	+7.35	
26	Shen Guoqin	China	1:29.11	+7.50	
27	Hiromi Ozawa	Japan	1:29.20	+7.59	
28	Miao Min	China	1:29.22	+7.61	
29	Han Chun-ok	North Korea	1:29.30	+7.69	
30	Emese Hunyady	Hungary	1:29.36	+7.75	
31	Lee Yeon-ju	South Korea	1:29.80	+8.19	
32	Cao Guifeng	China	1:30.28	+8.67	
33	Marzia Peretti	Italy	1:30.33	+8.72	
34	Lee Kyung-ja	South Korea	1:31.11	+9.50	
35	Choi Seung-youn	South Korea	1:32.31	+10.70	
36	Bibija Kerla	Yugoslavia	1:51.06	+29.45	
37	Natalya Glebova	Soviet Union	1:55.42	+33.81	
38	Dubravka Vukušić	Yugoslavia	2:03.02	+41.41	
