= Speed skating at the 1984 Winter Olympics – Women's 1500 metres =

Women's 1500 metres at the XIV Olympic Winter Games
- Pictogram for speed skating
- Venue: Zetra Ice Rink
- Dates: February 9, 1984
- Competitors: 32 from 15 nations
- Winning time: 2:03.42 WR

Medalists
1st place, gold medalist(s)		Karin Enke; East Germany
2nd place, silver medalist(s)		Andrea Schöne; East Germany
3rd place, bronze medalist(s)		Natalya Petrusyova; Soviet Union

The women's 1500 metres in speed skating at the 1984 Winter Olympics took place on February 9, at the Zetra Ice Rink.

== Records ==
Prior to this competition, the existing world and Olympic records were as follows:

World record	Nataliya Petrusyova (URS)	2:04.04	Alma-Ata, Kazakh SSR, Soviet Union	25 March 1983
Olympic record	Annie Borckink (NED)	2:10.95	Lake Placid, United States	14 February 1980

The following new world record was set.

Date	Athlete	Time	OR	WR
9 February	Karin Enke (GDR)	2:03.42	OR	WR

== Results ==
Rank	Pair	Lane	Athlete	Country	Time	Behind	Notes
1st place, gold medalist(s)	5	o	Karin Enke	East Germany	2:03.42	–	WR
2nd place, silver medalist(s)	1	o	Andrea Schöne	East Germany	2:05.29	+1.87	
3rd place, bronze medalist(s)	3	i	Natalya Petrusyova	Soviet Union	2:05.78	+2.36	
4	2	o	Gabi Schönbrunn	East Germany	2:07.69	+4.27	
5	15	i	Erwina Ryś-Ferens	Poland	2:08.08	+4.66	
6	4	o	Valentina Lalenkova	Soviet Union	2:08.17	+4.75	
7	2	i	Nataliya Kurova	Soviet Union	2:08.41	+4.99	
8	4	i	Bjørg Eva Jensen	Norway	2:09.53	+6.11	
9	9	i	Thea Limbach	Netherlands	2:10.35	+6.93	
10	9	o	Sigrid Smuda	West Germany	2:10.55	+7.13	
11	3	o	Yvonne van Gennip	Netherlands	2:10.61	+7.19	
12	5	i	Annette Carlén	Sweden	2:10.80	+7.38	
13	1	i	Ria Visser	Netherlands	2:11.06	+7.64	
14	8	i	Mary Docter	United States	2:12.14	+8.72	
15	7	i	Seiko Hashimoto	Japan	2:12.56	+9.14	
16	11	i	Silvia Brunner	Switzerland	2:12.62	+9.20	
17	7	o	Jane Goldman	United States	2:12.94	+9.52	
18	6	o	Nancy Swider-Peltz	United States	2:13.74	+10.32	
19	12	o	Pak Gum-hyon	North Korea	2:14.23	+10.81	
20	11	o	Han Chun-ok	North Korea	2:14.25	+10.83	
21	8	i	Natalie Grenier	Canada	2:14.72	+11.30	
22	6	i	Sylvie Daigle	Canada	2:15.50	+12.08	
23	15	o	Wang Guifang	China	2:16.19	+12.77	
24	13	i	Wang Xiuli	China	2:16.68	+13.26	
25	14	o	Kim Chang-hae	North Korea	2:17.37	+13.95	
26	13	o	Choi Seung-youn	South Korea	2:17.80	+14.38	
27	10	i	Lee Kyung-ja	South Korea	2:17.96	+14.54	
28	12	i	Lee Yeon-ju	South Korea	2:18.34	+14.92	
29	14	i	Kong Meiyu	China	2:19.56	+16.14	
30	16	i	Lilianna Morawiec	Poland	2:39.37	+35.95	
31	10	o	Dubravka Vukušić	Yugoslavia	2:42.12	+38.70	
32	16	o	Bibija Kerla	Yugoslavia	2:46.32	+42.90	
