= Speed skating at the 1984 Winter Olympics – Women's 500 metres =

Women's 500 metres at the XIV Olympic Winter Games
- Pictogram for speed skating
- Venue: Zetra Ice Rink
- Dates: February 10, 1984
- Competitors: 33 from 16 nations
- Winning time: 41.02 OR

Medalists
1st place, gold medalist(s)		Christa Rothenburger; East Germany
2nd place, silver medalist(s)		Karin Enke; East Germany
3rd place, bronze medalist(s)		Natalya Shive; Soviet Union

The women's 500 metres in speed skating at the 1984 Winter Olympics took place on 10 February, at the Zetra Ice Rink.

== Records ==
Prior to this competition, the existing world and Olympic records were as follows:

World record	Christa Rothenburger (GDR)	39.69	Alma-Ata, Kazakh SSR, Soviet Union	25 March 1983
Olympic record	Karin Enke (GDR)	41.78	Lake Placid, United States	15 February 1980

The following new Olympic record was set.

Date	Athlete	Time	OR	WR
10 February	Christa Rothenburger (GDR)	41.02	OR	

== Results ==
Rank	Pair	Lane	Athlete	Country	Time	Behind	Notes
1st place, gold medalist(s)	5	i	Christa Rothenburger	East Germany	41.02	–	OR
2nd place, silver medalist(s)	6	i	Karin Enke	East Germany	41.28	+0.26	
3rd place, bronze medalist(s)	3	o	Natalya Shive	Soviet Union	41.50	+0.48	
4	4	o	Irina Kuleshova	Soviet Union	41.70	+0.68	
5	2	o	Skadi Walter	East Germany	42.16	+1.14	
6	1	i	Natalya Petrusyova	Soviet Union	42.19	+1.17	
7	4	i	Monika Pflug	West Germany	42.40	+1.38	
8	8	o	Bonnie Blair	United States	42.53	+1.51	
9	7	i	Erwina Ryś-Ferens	Poland	42.71	+1.69	
10	16	i	Katie Class	United States	42.97	+1.95	
11	10	i	Silvia Brunner	Switzerland	42.99	+1.97	
11	7	o	Seiko Hashimoto	Japan	42.99	+1.97	
13	10	o	Connie Paraskevin	United States	43.05	+2.03	
14	14	i	Zofia Tokarczyk	Poland	43.13	+2.11	
15	16	o	Lilianna Morawiec	Poland	43.43	+2.41	
16	13	o	Hiromi Ozawa	Japan	43.46	+2.44	
17	5	o	Marzia Peretti	Italy	43.63	+2.61	
18	6	o	Annette Carlén	Sweden	43.65	+2.63	
19	9	i	Emese Hunyady	Hungary	43.70	+2.68	
20	2	i	Sylvie Daigle	Canada	43.74	+2.72	
20	3	i	Sigrid Smuda	West Germany	43.74	+2.72	
22	9	o	Shoko Fusano	Japan	43.75	+2.73	
22	11	i	Lee Yeon-ju	South Korea	43.75	+2.73	
24	15	o	Edel Therese Høiseth	Norway	43.96	+2.94	
25	8	i	Cao Guifeng	China	44.11	+3.09	
26	15	i	Shen Guoqin	China	44.21	+3.19	
27	12	o	Thea Limbach	Netherlands	44.31	+3.29	
28	17	i	Miao Min	China	44.49	+3.47	
29	14	o	Choi Seung-youn	South Korea	44.79	+3.77	
30	11	o	Ria Visser	Netherlands	45.05	+4.03	
31	12	i	Dubravka Vukušić	Yugoslavia	51.99	+10.97	
32	13	i	Bibija Kerla	Yugoslavia	58.23	+17,21	
33	1	o	Alie Boorsma	Netherlands	62.05	+21,03	
