= China at the 1980 Winter Olympics =

Sporting event delegation

- IOC code: CHN
- NOC: Chinese Olympic Committee
- Website: www.olympic.cn (in Chinese and English)

in Lake Placid
- Competitors: 24 (13 men, 11 women) in 5 sports
- Flag bearer: Zhao Weichang (speed skating)
- Medals: Gold 0 Silver 0 Bronze 0 Total 0

Winter Olympics appearances (overview)
- 1980; 1984; 1988; 1992; 1994; 1998; 2002; 2006; 2010; 2014; 2018; 2022; 2026

The People's Republic of China competed at the Winter Olympic Games for the first time at the 1980 Winter Olympics in Lake Placid, United States.

== Alpine skiing ==
Men

Athlete	Event	Race 1		Race 2		Total	
Athlete	Event	Time	Rank	Time	Rank	Time	Rank
Piao Dongyi	Giant Slalom	1:38.38	58	1:44.62	52	3:23.00	50
Piao Dongyi	Slalom	1:10.89	40	1:10.71	34	2:21.60	34

Women

Athlete	Event	Race 1		Race 2		Total	
Athlete	Event	Time	Rank	Time	Rank	Time	Rank
Wang Guizhen	Giant Slalom	1:32.41	39	2:12.18	35	3:44.59	35
Wang Guizhen	Slalom	59.26	24	59.75	18	1:59.01	18

== Biathlon ==
Men

Event	Athlete	Misses ^{1}	Time	Rank
10 km Sprint	Li Xiaoming	DSQ	–	–
10 km Sprint	Han Jinsuo	6	44:06.85	46
10 km Sprint	Song Yongjun	3	38:37.19	41

Event	Athlete	Time	Penalties	Adjusted time ^{2}	Rank
20 km	Wang Yumjie	1'17:49.77	16	1'33:49.77	46
20 km	Ying Zhenshan	1'15:47.00	13	1'28:47.00	44

Men's 4 x 7.5 km relay

Athletes	Race		
Athletes	Misses ^{1}	Time	Rank
Song Yongjun; Ying Zhenshan; Li Xiaoming; Wang Yumjie	18	2'01:33.36	14

^{1} A penalty loop of 150 metres had to be skied per missed target.
^{2} One minute added per close miss (a hit in the outer ring), two minutes added per complete miss.

== Cross-country skiing ==
Men

Event	Athlete	Race	
Event	Athlete	Time	Rank
15 km	Lin Guanghao	48:38.36	50

Women

Event	Athlete	Race	
Event	Athlete	Time	Rank
5 km	Ren Guiping	19:01.74	38
10 km	Ren Guiping	38:23.45	38

== Figure skating ==
Men

Athlete	CF	SP	FS	Points	Places	Rank
Zhaoxiao Xu	17	16	16	117.16	144	16

Women

Athlete	CF	SP	FS	Points	Places	Rank
Bao Zhenhua	22	21	20	126.96	191	22

== Speed skating ==
Men

Event	Athlete	Race	
Event	Athlete	Time	Rank
500 m	Su He	41.26	33
500 m	Zhao Weichang	41.18	31
500 m	Wang Nianchun	39.73	23
1000 m	Wang Nianchun	1:24.20	36
1000 m	Li Huchun	1:22.10	32
1000 m	Zhao Weichang	1:20.97	24
1500 m	Li Huchun	2:10.00	30
1500 m	Guo Chengjiang	2:08.33	29
1500 m	Zhao Weichang	2:05.48	25

Women

Event	Athlete	Race	
Event	Athlete	Time	Rank
500 m	Wang Limei	45.57	29
500 m	Shen Guoqin	45.03	27
500 m	Cao Guifeng	44.43	21
1000 m	Shen Zhenshu	1:32.49	32
1000 m	Zhang Li	1:32.20	31
1000 m	Cao Guifeng	1:31.74	27
1500 m	Shen Guoqin	2:41.99	30
1500 m	Chen Shuhua	2:29.48	29
1500 m	Kong Meiyu	2:22.48	27
3000 m	Piao Meiji	5:19.07	28
3000 m	Kong Meiyu	5:08.90	27
