= 1975 Women's World Allround Speed Skating Championships =

International speed skating competition

- Venue: De Bonte Wever Rink, Assen, Netherlands
- Dates: 22–23 February
- Competitors: 30 from 13 nations

Medalist women
1st place, gold medalist(s)		Karin Kessow	GDR
2nd place, silver medalist(s)		Tatyana Averina	URS
3rd place, bronze medalist(s)		Sheila Young	USA

The 36th edition of the World Allround Speed Skating Championships for Women was held on 22 and 23 February in Assen at the De Bonte Wever ice rink.

Title holder was the Netherlander Atje Keulen-Deelstra.

== Distance medalists ==
Event	Gold (gold)	Silver (silver)	Bronze (bronze)
500m	Sheila Young	Cathy Priestner	Makiko Nagaya
1500m	Karin Kessow	Erwina Ryś	Tatyana Averina
1000m	Sheila Young	Tatyana Averina	Cathy Priestner
3000m	Sippie Tigchelaar	Karin Kessow	Tatyana Averina

== Classification ==
Rank	Skater	Land	Points Samalog	500m	1500m	1000m	3000m
1st place, gold medalist(s)	Karin Kessow	East Germany	186.394	44.9 (8)	2:19.31 (gold)	1:31.70 (4)	4:55.24 (2)
2nd place, silver medalist(s)	Tatyana Averina	Soviet Union	186.653	44.5 (4)	2:20.98 (2)	1:30.97 (2)	4:58.05 (3)
3rd place, bronze medalist(s)	Sheila Young	United States	186.984	42.3 (gold)	2:23.42 (6)	1:30.87 (gold)	5:08.65 (9)
4	Erwina Ryś	Poland	187.312	44.6 (5)	2:20.39 (2)	1:32.20 (6)	4:58.89 (4)
5	Cathy Priestner	Canada	190.415	43.7 (2)	2:25.12 (15)	1:31.56 (3)	5:15.37 (16)
6	Paula-Irmeli Halonen	Finland	190.487	45.0 (9)	2:24.09 (10)	1:31.77 (5)	5:09.43 (11)
7	Sippie Tigchelaar	Netherlands	190.861	47.8 (29)	2:23.23 (5)	1:33.62 (13)	4:51.05 (gold)
8	Sophie Westenbroek	Netherlands	190.973	45.6 (11)	2:23.80 (8)	1:33.37 (11)	5:04.53 (6)
9	Tatyana Shelekhova-Rastopshyna	Soviet Union	191.655	45.9 (14)	2:23.88 (9)	1:33.91 (15)	5:05.04 (7)
10	Annie Borckink	Netherlands	191.695	46.3 (17)	2:22.22 (4)	1:33.49 (12)	5:07.46 (8)
11	Galina Stepanskaya	Soviet Union	192.061	46.7 (24)	2:24.19 (12)	1:33.62 (13)	5:02.93 (5)
12	Makiko Nagaya	Japan	192.145	44.2 (3)	2:26.96 (19)	1:33.29 (10)	5:13.88 (15)
13	Janina Korowicka	Poland	193.492	46.3 (17)	2:24.71 (13)	1:34.96 (22)	5:08.85 (10)
14	Gayle Gordon	Canada	193.620	46.3 (17)	2:24.81 (14)	1:34.73 (19)	5:10.11 (12)
15	Sigrid Sundby	Norway	193.862	46.1 (16)	2:24.12 (11)	1:34.93 (20)	5:13.54 (14)
16	Monika Holzner-Pflug	West Germany	196.645	44.7 (6)	2:23.54 (7)	1:43.91 * (30)	5:12.86 (13)
NC17	Lyudmila Ankudimova	Soviet Union	141.198	45.6 (11)	2:28.30 (20)	1:32.33 (7)	-
NC18	Connie Carpenter	United States	141.380	46.0 (15)	2:25.17 (16)	1:33.98 (16)	-
NC19	Sylvia Filipsson	Sweden	141.952	46.3 (17)	2:25.31 (17)	1:34.43 (17)	-
NC20	Leah Poulos	United States	142.263	44.8 (7)	2:33.82 (27)	1:32.38 (8)	-
NC21	Lisbeth Korsmo-Berg	Norway	143.095	46.7 (24)	2:26.10 (18)	1:35.39 (23)	-
NC22	Denise Chlapaty	United States	143.422	46.3 (17)	2:28.94 (21)	1:34.95 (21)	-
NC23	Chieko Ito	Japan	145.243	47.3 (28)	2:29.32 (22)	1:36.34 (24)	-
NC24	Fu Huimin	China	145.483	46.6 (22)	2:31.30 (24)	1:36.90 (25)	-
NC25	Haitske Pijlman	Netherlands	146.155	45.6 (11)	2:42.72 * (28)	1:32.63 (9)	-
NC26	Heidi Schalch	Switzerland	146.372	46.7 (24)	2:31.82 (26)	1:38.13 (27)	-
NC27	Berit Haugård	Norway	147.178	47.0 (27)	2:30.70 (23)	1:39.89 (29)	-
NC28	Mariko Sugawara	Japan	147.728	48.0 (30)	2:31.45 (25)	1:38.49 (28)	-
NC29	Ann-Sofie Järnström	Sweden	149.347	45.3 (10)	2:50.30 * (29)	1:35.56 (18)	-
NC30	Liz Appleby	Canada	154.562	46.6 (22)	2:57.70 * (30)	1:37.59 (26)	-

* = Fall
