= Speed skating at the 1980 Winter Olympics – Women's 1000 metres =

Women's 1000 metres at the XIII Olympic Winter Games
- Pictogram for speed skating
- Venue: James B. Sheffield Olympic Skating Rink
- Dates: February 17, 1980
- Competitors: 37 from 16 nations
- Winning time: 1:24.10

Medalists
1st place, gold medalist(s)		Nataliya Petrusyova; Soviet Union
2nd place, silver medalist(s)		Leah Poulos-Mueller; United States
3rd place, bronze medalist(s)		Sylvia Albrecht; East Germany

The women's 1000 metres in speed skating at the 1980 Winter Olympics took place on 17 February, at the James B. Sheffield Olympic Skating Rink.

== Records ==
Prior to this competition, the existing world and Olympic records were as follows:

World record	Tatyana Averina-Barabash (URS)	1:23.46	Alma-Ata, Kazakh SSR, Soviet Union	29 March 1975
Olympic record	Tatyana Averina-Barabash (URS)	1:28.43	Innsbruck, Austria	7 February 1976

The following new world and olympic record was set during the competition.

Date	Pair	Athlete	Country	Time	OR	WR
17 February	Pair 1	Sylvia Filipsson	Sweden	1:28.18	OR	
17 February	Pair 2	Natalya Petrusyova	Soviet Union	1:24.10	OR	

== Results ==
Rank	Pair	Lane	Athlete	Country	Time	Behind	Notes
1st place, gold medalist(s)	2	i	Nataliya Petrusyova	Soviet Union	1:24.10	–	OR
2nd place, silver medalist(s)	2	o	Leah Poulos-Mueller	United States	1:25.41	+1.31	
3rd place, bronze medalist(s)	3	o	Sylvia Albrecht	East Germany	1:26.46	+2.36	
4	6	o	Karin Enke	East Germany	1:26.66	+2.56	
5	9	i	Beth Heiden	United States	1:27.01	+2.91	
6	17	o	Annie Borckink	Netherlands	1:27.24	+3.14	
7	4	i	Sylvia Burka	Canada	1:27.50	+3.40	
8	5	o	Ann-Sofie Järnström	Sweden	1:28.10	+4.00	
9	1	o	Sylvia Filipsson	Sweden	1:28.18	+4.08	
10	15	o	Annette Karlsson	Sweden	1:28.25	+4.15	
11	7	o	Valentina Lalenkova	Soviet Union	1:28.27	+4.17	
12	7	i	Bjørg Eva Jensen	Norway	1:28.55	+4.45	
13	15	i	Sijtje van der Lende	Netherlands	1:28.72	+4.62	
14	5	i	Sarah Docter	United States	1:28.80	+4.70	
14	10	o	Haitske Valentijn-Pijlman	Netherlands	1:28.80	+4.70	
16	16	i	Erwina Ryś-Ferens	Poland	1:28.82	+4.72	
17	10	i	Miyoshi Kato	Japan	1:28.97	+4.87	
18	4	o	Christa Rothenburger	East Germany	1:29.69	+5.59	
19	9	o	Brenda Webster	Canada	1:29.84	+5.74	
20	1	o	Irina Kovrova	Soviet Union	1:29.94	+5.84	
21	8	o	Monika Pflug	West Germany	1:30.13	+6.03	
22	1	o	Makiko Nagaya	Japan	1:30.27	+6.17	
23	12	i	Sigrid Smuda	West Germany	1:30.29	+6.19	
24	8	o	Kathy Vogt	Canada	1:30.33	+6.23	
25	9	i	Yuko Yaegashi-Ota	Japan	1:30.72	+6.62	
26	14	i	Lee Nam-Sun	South Korea	1:31.30	+7.20	
27	18	i	Cao Guifeng	China	1:31.74	+7.64	
28	14	o	Anneli Repola	Finland	1:31.76	+7.66	
29	11	i	Silvia Brunner	Switzerland	1:31.79	+7.69	
30	12	o	Lee Seong-ae	South Korea	1:32.04	+7.94	
31	19	i	Zhang Li	China	1:32.20	+8.10	
32	17	i	Shen Zhenshu	China	1:32.49	+8.39	
33	13	i	Brigitte Flierl	West Germany	1:33.61	+9.51	
34	16	o	Kim Yeong-hui	South Korea	1:34.17	+10.07	
35	18	o	Kim Ferran	Great Britain	1:34.19	+10.09	
36	11	o	Marzia Peretti	Italy	1:35.66	+11.56	
37	13	o	Mandy Horsepool	Great Britain	1:36.31	+12.21	
