= 1976 Women's World Allround Speed Skating Championships =

International speed skating competition

1976 World Allround Speed Skating Championships for Women
- Venue: Gjøvik Stadion, Gjøvik, Norway
- Dates: 21–22 February
- Competitors: 29 skaters from 10 countries

Medalist women
1st place, gold medalist(s)		Sylvia Burka	CAN
2nd place, silver medalist(s)		Tatjana Averina	SOV
3rd place, bronze medalist(s)		Sheila Young	USA

The 37th edition of the World Allround Speed Skating Championships 1976 took place on 21 and 22 February in Gjøvik, Norway at the Gjøvik Stadion ice rink.

Title holder was the East German Karin Kessow.

== Distance medalists ==
Event	Gold (gold)	Silver (silver)	Bronze (bronze)
500m	Sheila Young	Leah Poulos	Paula-Irmeli Halonen
1500m	Sylvia Burka	Sijtje van der Lende	Tatyana Averina
1000m	Sheila Young	Tatyana Averina	Sylvia Burka
3000m	Karin Kessow	Sylvia Filipsson	Monika Zernicek

== Classification ==
Rank	Skater	Country	Points Samalog	500m	1500m	1000m	3000m
1st place, gold medalist(s)	Sylvia Burka	Canada	184.840	44.09 (5)	2:18.60 (gold)	1:29.59 (3)	4:58.53 (7)
2nd place, silver medalist(s)	Tatyana Averina	Soviet Union	185.283	43.79 (4)	2:19.44 (3)	1:29.58 (2)	5:01.34 (9)
3rd place, bronze medalist(s)	Sheila Young	United States	186.540	42.26 (gold)	2:20.76 (6)	1:28.69 (gold)	5:12.09 (14)
4	Sijtje van der Lende	Netherlands	186.580	45.40 (15)	2:19.38 (2)	1:30.63 (7)	4:56.43 (4)
5	Paula-Irmeli Halonen	Finland	186.716	43.69 (3)	2:20.38 (4)	1:30.02 (4)	5:07.34 (13)
6	Sylvia Filipsson	Sweden	186.766	44.73 (9)	2:20.56 (5)	1:31.83 (14)	4:55.61 (2)
7	Karin Kessow	East Germany	187.425	45.72 (18)	2:21.28 (9)	1:32.22 (16)	4:51.01 (gold)
8	Lisbeth Korsmo-Berg	Norway	187.932	45.35 (14)	2:21.95 (12)	1:31.69 (13)	4:56.52 (5)
9	Lyudmila Ankudimova	Soviet Union	188.103	45.07 (11)	2:20.76 (6)	1:30.43 (5)	5:05.39 (12)
10	Monika Zernicek	East Germany	188.167	45.99 (20)	2:21.33 (10)	1:31.58 (11)	4:55.66 (3)
11	Nancy Swider-Peltz	United States	188.190	45.33 (13)	2:22.97 (15)	1:30.61 (6)	4:59.39 (8)
12	Erwina Rys	Poland	189.087	45.24 (12)	2:22.32 (13)	1:31.63 (12)	5:03.55 (11)
13	Galina Stepanskaya	Soviet Union	189.112	46.63 (24)	2:21.15 (8)	1:31.49 (10)	4:58.12 (6)
14	Annie Borckink	Netherlands	189.125	45.51 (17)	2:21.35 (11)	1:31.93 (15)	5:03.20 (10)
15	Kim Kostron	United States	191.125	44.37 (6)	2:24.18 (18)	1:31.11 (8)	5:18.84 (16)
16	Vera Bryndzei	Soviet Union	192.595	45.43 (16)	2:23.59 (16)	1:34.20 (21)	5:13.21 (15)
NC17	Haitske Pijlman	Netherlands	138.980	44.93 (10)	2:22.71 (14)	1:32.96 (17)	–
NC18	Ann-Sofie Järnström	Sweden	139.097	44.40 (7)	2:27.02 (23)	1:31.38 (9)	–
NC19	Liz Appleby	Canada	141.275	46.18 (21)	2:23.88 (17)	1:34.27 (22)	–
NC20	Tuula Vilkas	Finland	141.277	45.96 (19)	2:25.64 (21)	1:33.54 (18)	–
NC21	Makiko Nagaya	Japan	141.315	44.51 (8)	2:29.34 (26)	1:34.05 (20)	–
NC22	Margriet Pomper	Netherlands	141.718	46.61 (23)	2:24.55 (20)	1:33.85 (19)	–
NC23	Janina Korowicka	Poland	143.043	46.66 (25)	2:26.74 (22)	1:34.94 (24)	–
NC24	Yuko Ota	Japan	143.925	46.46 (22)	2:29.04 (25)	1:35.57 (25)	–
NC25	Ewa Malewicka	Poland	144.230	47.44 (28)	2:28.29 (24)	1:34.72 (23)	–
NC26	Anne Gjersem	Norway	146.767	47.09 (26)	2:32.33 (27)	1:37.80 (27)	–
NC27	Berit Haugård	Norway	147.483	47.23 (27)	2:33.94 (28)	1:37.88 (28)	–
NC28	Brigitte Flierl	West Germany	148.125	47.90 (29)	2:34.86 (29)	1:37.21 (26)	–
NC	Leah Poulos	United States	91.177	43.08 (2)	2:24.29 (19)	DQ	–

* = Fell

== Attribution ==
In Dutch
