= Speed skating at the 1984 Winter Olympics – Women's 3000 metres =

Women's 3000 metres at the XIV Olympic Winter Games
- Pictogram for speed skating
- Venue: Zetra Ice Rink
- Dates: February 15, 1984
- Competitors: 26 from 14 nations
- Winning time: 4:24.79

Medalists
1st place, gold medalist(s)		Andrea Schöne; East Germany
2nd place, silver medalist(s)		Karin Enke; East Germany
3rd place, bronze medalist(s)		Gabi Schönbrunn; East Germany

The women's 3000 metres in speed skating at the 1984 Winter Olympics took place on 15 February, at the Zetra Ice Rink.

== Records ==
Prior to this competition, the existing world and Olympic records were as follows:

World record	Gabi Zange (GDR)	4:21.70	Alma-Ata, Kazakh SSR, Soviet Union	28 March 1981
Olympic record	Bjørg Eva Jensen (NOR)	4:32.13	Lake Placid, United States	20 February 1980

The following new Olympic record was set.

Date	Athlete	Time	OR	WR
15 February	Andrea Schöne (GDR)	4:24.79	OR	

== Results ==
Rank	Pair	Lane	Athlete	Country	Time	Behind	Notes
1st place, gold medalist(s)	1	i	Andrea Schöne	East Germany	4:24.79	–	OR
2nd place, silver medalist(s)	3	i	Karin Enke	East Germany	4:26.33	+1.54	
3rd place, bronze medalist(s)	4	o	Gabi Schönbrunn	East Germany	4:33.13	+8.34	
4	2	i	Olga Pleshkova	Soviet Union	4:34.42	+9.63	
5	5	i	Yvonne van Gennip	Netherlands	4:34.80	+10.09	
6	9	i	Mary Docter	United States	4:36.25	+11.46	
7	6	i	Bjørg Eva Jensen	Norway	4:36.28	+11.49	
8	5	o	Valentina Lalenkova	Soviet Union	4:37.36	+12.57	
9	7	o	Natalya Petrusyova	Soviet Union	4:39.36	+14.57	
10	3	o	Nancy Swider-Peltz	United States	4:40.10	+15.31	
11	1	o	Annette Carlén	Sweden	4:40.36	+15.57	
12	7	i	Jane Goldman	United States	4:42.49	+17.70	
13	12	o	Thea Limbach	Netherlands	4:42.84	+18.05	
14	3	i	Erwina Ryś-Ferens	Poland	4:42.90	+18.11	
15	8	o	Natalie Grenier	Canada	4:48.60	+23.81	
16	10	i	Pak Gum-hyon	North Korea	4:49.26	+24.47	
17	11	i	Han Chun-ok	North Korea	4:51.91	+27.12	
18	8	i	Sigrid Smuda	West Germany	4:53.22	+28.43	
19	6	o	Seiko Hashimoto	Japan	4:53.38	+28.59	
20	13	i	Kim Chang-hae	North Korea	4:58.41	+33.62	
21	10	o	Wang Guifang	China	4:59.32	+34.53	
22	12	o	Wang Xiuli	China	5:00.15	+35.36	
23	9	o	Kong Meiyu	China	5:03.43	+38.64	
24	11	o	Lee Kyung-ja	South Korea	5:07.12	+42.33	
25	4	i	Ria Visser	Netherlands	5:14.80	+50.01	
26	13	o	Bibija Kerla	Yugoslavia	5:37.67	+1:12.47	
