= Speed skating at the 1980 Winter Olympics – Women's 500 metres =

Women's 500 metres at the XIII Olympic Winter Games
- Pictogram for speed skating
- Venue: James B. Sheffield Olympic Skating Rink
- Dates: February 15, 1980
- Competitors: 31 from 15 nations
- Winning time: 41.78

Medalists
1st place, gold medalist(s)		Karin Enke	East Germany
2nd place, silver medalist(s)		Leah Poulos-Mueller	United States
3rd place, bronze medalist(s)		Nataliya Petrusyova	Soviet Union

The women's 500 metres in speed skating at the 1980 Winter Olympics took place on 15 February, at the James B. Sheffield Olympic Skating Rink.

== Records ==
Prior to this competition, the existing world and Olympic records were as follows:

World record	Sheila Young (USA)	40.68	Inzell, West Germany	13 March 1976
Olympic record	Sheila Young (USA)	42.76	Innsbruck, Austria	6 February 1976

The following new Olympic record was set.

Date	Athlete	Time	OR	WR
15 February	Karin Enke (GDR)	41.78	OR	

== Results ==
Rank	Pair	Lane	Athlete	Country	Time	Difference	Notes
1st place, gold medalist(s)	2	o	Karin Enke	East Germany	41.78	–	OR
2nd place, silver medalist(s)	4	i	Leah Poulos-Mueller	United States	42.26	+0.48	
3rd place, bronze medalist(s)	3	o	Natalya Petrusyova	Soviet Union	42.42	+0.64	
4	1	i	Ann-Sofie Järnström	Sweden	42.47	+0.69	
5	1	o	Makiko Nagaya	Japan	42.70	+0.92	
6	4	o	Cornelia Jacob	East Germany	42.98	+1.20	
7	3	i	Beth Heiden	United States	43.18	+1.40	
8	9	o	Tetiana Tarasova	Soviet Union	43.26	+1.48	
9	10	i	Sylvia Burka	Canada	43.43	+1.65	
10	5	i	Irina Kovrova	Soviet Union	43.50	+1.72	
11	11	i	Erwina Ryś-Ferens	Poland	43.52	+1.74	
12	5	o	Christa Rothenburger	East Germany	43.60	+1.82	
13	10	o	Silvia Brunner	Switzerland	43.72	+1.94	
14	16	i	Lee Nam-Sun	South Korea	43.85	+2.07	
15	8	i	Haitske Valentijn-Pijlman	Netherlands	44.02	+2.24	
16	14	i	Sylvia Filipsson	Sweden	44.05	+2.27	
17	11	o	Sigrid Smuda	West Germany	44.11	+2.33	
18	8	i	Kathy Vogt	Canada	44.15	+2.37	
19	8	o	Sylvie Daigle	Canada	44.16	+2.38	
20	12	o	Anneli Repola	Finland	44.33	+2.55	
21	13	i	Cao Guifeng	China	44.43	+2.66	
22	13	o	Annie Borckink	Netherlands	44.47	+2.69	
23	2	i	Sarah Docter	United States	44.48	+2.70	
24	6	o	Annette Karlsson	Sweden	44.52	+2.74	
25	9	i	Monika Pflug	West Germany	44.59	+2.81	
26	14	o	Sijtje van der Lende	Netherlands	44.74	+2.96	
27	12	i	Shen Guoqin	China	45.03	+3.25	
28	7	o	Brigitte Flierl	West Germany	45.28	+3.50	
29	15	i	Wang Limei	China	45.57	+3.79	
30	16	o	Kim Ferran	Great Britain	47.25	+5.47	
-	7	i	Marzia Peretti	Italy	DNF	–	Fall
