= Speed skating at the 1976 Winter Olympics – Women's 1000 metres =

Women's 1000 metres at the XII Olympic Winter Games
- Pictogram for speed skating
- Venue: Eisschnellaufbahn
- Dates: February 7, 1976
- Competitors: 27 from 12 nations
- Winning time: 1:28.43

Medalists
1st place, gold medalist(s)		Tatyana Averina; Soviet Union
2nd place, silver medalist(s)		Leah Poulos; United States
3rd place, bronze medalist(s)		Sheila Young; United States

The women's 1000 metres in speed skating at the 1976 Winter Olympics took place on 7 February, at the Eisschnellaufbahn.

== Records ==
Prior to this competition, the existing world and Olympic records were as follows:

World record	Tatyana Averina (URS)	1:23.46	Alma-Ata, Kazakh SSR, Soviet Union	29 March 1975
Olympic record	Monika Pflug (FRG)	1:31.40	Sapporo, Japan	11 February 1972

The following new world and olympic records was set during the competition.

Date	Pair	Athlete	Country	Time	OR	WR
7 February	Pair 1	Monika Holzner-Pflug	West Germany	1:29.54	OR	
7 February	Pair 5	Leah Poulos	United States	1:28.57	OR	
7 February	Pair 6	Tatyana Averina	Soviet Union	1:28.43	OR	

== Results ==
Rank	Pair	Lane	Athlete	Country	Time	Behind	Notes
1st place, gold medalist(s)	6	o	Tatyana Averina	Soviet Union	1:28.43	–	OR
2nd place, silver medalist(s)	5	o	Leah Poulos	United States	1:28.57	+0.14	
3rd place, bronze medalist(s)	9	i	Sheila Young	United States	1:29.14	+0.71	
4	7	i	Sylvia Burka	Canada	1:29.47	+1.04	
5	1	i	Monika Holzner-Pflug	West Germany	1:29.54	+1.11	
6	2	i	Cathy Priestner	Canada	1:29.66	+1.23	
7	5	i	Lyudmila Titova	Soviet Union	1:30.06	+1.63	
8	8	o	Heike Lange	East Germany	1:30.55	+2.12	
9	2	o	Makiko Nagaya	Japan	1:31.23	+2.80	
10	10	i	Erwina Ryś-Ferens	Poland	1:31.59	+3.16	
11	10	o	Sijtje van der Lende	Netherlands	1:31.66	+3.23	
12	6	i	Monika Zernicek	East Germany	1:31.68	+3.25	
13	3	o	Paula-Irmeli Halonen	Finland	1:31.72	+3.29	
14	1	o	Ann-Sofie Järnström	Sweden	1:32.06	+3.63	
15	11	i	Tetiana Shelekhova	Soviet Union	1:32.08	+3.65	
16	4	i	Annie Borckink	Netherlands	1:32.50	+4.07	
17	6	i	Tuula Vilkas	Finland	1:32.94	+4.51	
18	3	i	Sigrid Sundby-Dybedahl	Norway	1:33.05	+4.62	
19	4	o	Ewa Malewicka	Poland	1:33.89	+5.46	
20	12	i	Yuko Yaegashi-Ota	Japan	1:33.99	+5.56	
21	13	i	Ute Dix	East Germany	1:34.14	+5.71	
22	12	o	Liz Appleby	Canada	1:34.27	+5.84	
23	14	o	Christa Jaarsma	Netherlands	1:34.63	+6.20	
24	9	o	Keiko Hasegawa	Japan	1:35.42	+6.99	
25	7	o	Lee Nam-Sun	South Korea	1:35.58	+7.15	
26	14	i	Janina Korowicka	Poland	1:35.81	+7.38	
-	13	o	Peggy Crowe	United States	DQ		
