= Speed skating at the 1980 Winter Olympics – Women's 1500 metres =

Women's 1500 metres at the XIII Olympic Winter Games
- Pictogram for speed skating
- Venue: James B. Sheffield Olympic Skating Rink
- Dates: February 14, 1980
- Competitors: 31 from 14 nations
- Winning time: 2:10.95

Medalists
1st place, gold medalist(s)		Annie Borckink; Netherlands
2nd place, silver medalist(s)		Ria Visser; Netherlands
3rd place, bronze medalist(s)		Sabine Becker; East Germany

The women's 1500 metres in speed skating at the 1980 Winter Olympics took place on February 14, at the James B. Sheffield Olympic Skating Rink.

== Records ==
Prior to this competition, the existing world and Olympic records were as follows:

World record	Khalida Vorobyeva (URS)	2:07.18	Alma-Ata, Kazakh SSR, Soviet Union	10 April 1978
Olympic record	Galina Stepanskaya (URS)	2:16.58	Innsbruck, Austria	5 February 1976

The following new Olympic and world records were set during this competition.

Date	Pair	Athlete	Country	Time	OR	WR
14 February	Pair 1	Beth Heiden	United States	2:13.10	OR	
14 February	Pair 3	Ria Visser	Netherlands	2:12.35	OR	
14 February	Pair 5	Annie Borckink	Netherlands	2:10.95	OR	

== Results ==
Rank	Pair	Lane	Athlete	Country	Time	Behind	Notes
1st place, gold medalist(s)	5	o	Annie Borckink	Netherlands	2:10.95	–	OR
2nd place, silver medalist(s)	3	i	Ria Visser	Netherlands	2:12.35	+1.40	
3rd place, bronze medalist(s)	8	i	Sabine Becker	East Germany	2:12.38	+1.43	
4	4	i	Bjørg Eva Jensen	Norway	2:12.59	+1.64	
5	6	o	Sylvia Filipsson	Sweden	2:12.84	+1.89	
6	11	i	Andrea Mitscherlich	East Germany	2:13.05	+2.10	
7	1	i	Beth Heiden	United States	2:13.10	+2.15	
8	3	o	Nataliya Petrusyova	Soviet Union	2:14.15	+3.20	
9	2	o	Sylvia Albrecht	East Germany	2:14.27	+3.32	
10	1	o	Sylvia Burka	Canada	2:14.65	+3.70	
11	10	o	Brenda Webster	Canada	2:14.73	+3.78	
12	11	o	Mary Docter	United States	2:14.74	+3.79	
13	4	o	Sarah Docter	United States	2:15.11	+4.16	
14	7	i	Lisbeth Korsmo	Norway	2:15.63	+4.68	
15	8	o	Sijtje van der Lende	Netherlands	2:16.05	+5.10	
16	12	i	Kathy Vogt	Canada	2:16.09	+5.14	
17	2	i	Erwina Ryś	Poland	2:16.29	+5.34	
18	5	i	Tatyana Averina	Soviet Union	2:16.32	+5.37	
18	6	i	Vira Bryndzei	Soviet Union	2:16.32	+5.37	
20	9	o	Annette Karlsson	Sweden	2:17.31	+6.36	
21	7	o	Anneli Repola	Finland	2:17.81	+6.86	
22	10	i	Sigrid Smuda	West Germany	2:18.86	+7.91	
23	9	i	Yuko Yaegashi-Ota	Japan	2:19.41	+8.46	
24	16	i	Miyoshi Kato	Japan	2:19.80	+8.85	
25	15	i	Kim Yeong-hui	South Korea	2:20.23	+9.28	
26	12	o	Lee Seong-ae	South Korea	2:20.67	+9.72	
27	13	o	Kong Meiyu	China	2:22.48	+11.53	
28	13	i	Mandy Horsepool	Great Britain	2:23.05	+12.10	
29	15	o	Chen Shuhua	China	2:29.48	+18.53	
30	14	i	Shen Guoqin	China	2:41.99	+31.04	
-	14	o	Kim Ferran	Great Britain	DQ		
