= 1983 World Allround Speed Skating Championships for women =

International speed skating competition

1983 World Allround Speed Skating Championships for Women
- Venue: Eisschnelllaufbahn ice rink, Karl-Marx-Stadt, East Germany
- Dates: 19–20 February
- Competitors: 32 from 13 nations

Medalist women
1st place, gold medalist(s)		Andrea Schöne-Mitscherlich	DDR
2nd place, silver medalist(s)		Karin Enke	DDR
3rd place, bronze medalist(s)		Valentina Lalenkova-Golovenkina	SOV

The 44th edition of the World Allround Speed Skating Championships for Women took place on 19 and 20 February 1983 in Karl-Marx-Stadt at the Eisschnelllaufbahn ice rink.

Title holder was Karin Enke from East Germany.

This was the first world championship for women using the big combination of 500m, 3000m, 1500m and 5000m distances. The 1000m distance was replaced with 5000m. This was the only occasion that this championship was ever held in East Germany

== Distance medalists ==
Event	Gold (gold)	Silver (silver)	Bronze (bronze)
500m	Natalja Shive-Glebova	Karin Enke	Marzia Peretti
3000m	Andrea Schöne-Mitscherlich	Gabi Schönbrunn	Bjørg Eva Jensen
1500m	Andrea Schöne-Mitscherlich	Karin Enke	Valentina Lalenkova-Golovenkina
5000m	Andrea Schöne-Mitscherlich	Sabine Brehm	Gabi Schönbrunn

== Classification ==
Rank	Skater	Country	Points Samalog	500m	3000m	1500m	5000m
1st place, gold medalist(s)	Andrea Schöne-Mitscherlich	East Germany	178.983	43.09 (6)	4:30.33 (gold)	2:10.19 (gold)	7:54.42 (gold)
2nd place, silver medalist(s)	Karin Enke	East Germany	181.472	42.13 (2)	4:36.50 (4)	2:11.03 (2)	8:15.83 (8)
3rd place, bronze medalist(s)	Valentina Lalenkova-Golovenkina	Soviet Union	182.163	42.54 (5)	4:39.90 (7)	2:12.54 (3)	8:07.93 (5)
4	Gabi Schönbrunn	East Germany	182:571	43.23 (9)	4:35.79 (2)	2:14.98 (9)	8:03.83 (3)
5	Svetlana Kasjoek	Soviet Union	182.572	42.47 (4)	4:38.40 (6)	2:14.40 (7)	8:09.02 (6)
6	Sabine Brehm	East Germany	183.180	44.06 (19)	4:36.71 (5)	2:15.47 (10)	7:58.46 (2)
7	Bjørg Eva Jensen	Norway	183.399	44.08 (21)	4:36.41 (3)	2:14.25 (6)	8:05.01 (4)
8	Natalja Shive-Glebova	Soviet Union	183.846	41.66 (gold)	4:43.55 (12)	2:13.04 (4)	8:25.82 (14)
9	Ria Visser	Netherlands	184.846	44.06 (19)	4:40.39 (8)	2:13.84 (5)	8:14.42 (7)
10	Thea Limbach	Netherlands	185.626	44.27 (24)	4:40.74 (9)	2:14.79 (8)	8:16.36 (10)
11	Annette Karlsson	Sweden	186.473	43.77 (17)	4:44.60 (14)	2:15.70 (12)	8:20.37(11)
12	Ina Steenbruggen	Netherlands	186.960	44.11 (22)	4:45.85 (15)	2:16.84 (14)	8:15.96 (9)
13	Alie Boorsma	Netherlands	186.984	43.36 (11)	4:45.72 (16)	2:16.57 (13)	8:24.81 (12)
14	Seiko Hashimoto	Japan	188.664	43.41 (13)	4:46.69 (17)	2:19.26 (20)	8:30.53 (15)
15	Sylvie Daigle	Canada	188.805	43.66 (16)	4:44.04 (13)	2:18.55 (16)	8:36.22 (16)
16	Brenda Webster	Canada	190.432	43.13 (7)	4:42.54 (11)	2:29.19 (31)	8:24.82 (13)
NC17	Sigrid Smuda	West Germany	136.995	43.60 (15)	4:48.99 (18)	2:15.69 (11)	–
NC18	Dorie Boyce	United States	139.389	44.27 (24)	4:49.52 (20)	2:20.60 (22)	–
NC19	Miyoshi Kato	Japan	139.724	44.28 (26)	4:54.49 (21)	2:19.09 (17)	–
NC20	Nancy Swider	United States	139.798	44.82 (28)	4:49.49 (19)	2:20.19 (21)	–
NC21	Lydia Stephans	United States	140.173	44.21 (23)	4:57.48 (24)	2:19.15 (18)	–
NC22	Chieko Sato	Japan	140.239	43.98 (18)	4:54.94 (22)	2:21.31 (23)	–
NC23	Edel Therese Høiseth	Norway	140.364	43.31 (10)	5:03.95 (26)	2:19.19 (19)	–
NC24	Ewa Bialkowska	Poland	140.521	43.22 (8)	4:55.05 (23)	2:24.38 (26)	–
NC25	Marzia Peretti	Italy	141.751	42.44 (3)	5:04.75 (27)	2:25.56 (29)	–
NC26	Hiromi Ozawa	Japan	143.347	44.45 (27)	5:09.97 (29)	2:21.71 (24)	–
NC27	Lee Yeon-ju	South Korea	143.601	43.49 (14)	5:10.47 (30)	2:25.10 (28)	–
NC28	Angelika Haßmann	West Germany	143.988	46.05 (29)	4:58.71 (25)	2:24.46 (27)	–
NC29	Rose-Marie Karlsson	Sweden	145.649	46.19 (30)	5:08.96 (28)	2:23.90 (25)	–
NC30	Elena Belci	Italy	147.623	46.90 (31)	5:11.96 (31)	2:26.19 (30)	–
NC	Aila Tartia	Finland	89.483	43.40 (12)	DQ	2:18.25 (15)	–
NC	Mary Docter	United States	46.885	DQ	4:41.31 (10)	DQ	–

== Attribution ==
In Dutch
