= Speed skating at the 1980 Winter Olympics – Women's 3000 metres =

Women's 3000 metres at the XIII Olympic Winter Games
- Pictogram for speed skating
- Venue: James B. Sheffield Olympic Skating Rink
- Dates: February 20, 1980
- Competitors: 29 from 14 nations
- Winning time: 4:32.13 OR

Medalists
1st place, gold medalist(s)		Bjørg Eva Jensen; Norway
2nd place, silver medalist(s)		Sabine Becker; East Germany
3rd place, bronze medalist(s)		Beth Heiden; United States

The women's 3000 metres in speed skating at the 1980 Winter Olympics took place on 20 February, at the James B. Sheffield Olympic Skating Rink.

== Records ==
Prior to this competition, the existing world and Olympic records were as follows:

World record	Galina Stepanskaya (URS)	4:31.00	Alma-Ata, Kazakh SSR, Soviet Union	23 March 1976
Olympic record	Tatyana Averina (URS)	4:45.19	Innsbruck, Austria	8 February 1976

The following new Olympic record was set.

Date	Pair	Athlete	Country	Time	OR	WR
20 February	Pair 1	Bjørg Eva Jensen	Norway	4:32.13	OR	

== Results ==
Rank	Pair	Lane	Athlete	Country	Time	Behind	Notes
1st place, gold medalist(s)	1	o	Bjørg Eva Jensen	Norway	4:32.13	–	OR
2nd place, silver medalist(s)	2	o	Sabine Becker	East Germany	4:32.79	+0.66	
3rd place, bronze medalist(s)	1	i	Beth Heiden	United States	4:33.77	+1.64	
4	11	i	Andrea Mitscherlich	East Germany	4:37.69	+5.56	
5	3	o	Erwina Ryś-Ferens	Poland	4:37.89	+5.76	
6	4	i	Mary Docter	United States	4:39.29	+7.16	
7	4	o	Sylvia Filipsson	Sweden	4:40.22	+8.09	
8	6	o	Nataliya Petrusyova	Soviet Union	4:42.59	+10.46	
9	2	i	Olga Pleshkova	Soviet Union	4:43.11	+10.89	
10	8	i	Sarah Docter	United States	4:43.30	+11.17	
11	3	i	Brenda Webster	Canada	4:43.67	+11.54	
12	9	i	Sylvia Burka	Canada	4:44.22	+12.09	
13	6	i	Annie Borckink	Netherlands	4:47.35	+15.22	
14	10	i	Sylvia Albrecht	East Germany	4:47.76	+15.63	
15	11	o	Anneli Repola	Finland	4:50.51	+18.38	
16	8	o	Sijtje van der Lende	Netherlands	4:51.53	+19.40	
17	5	o	Valentina Lalenkova	Soviet Union	4:51.72	+19.59	
18	7	o	Annette Karlsson	Sweden	4:52.70	+20.57	
19	9	i	Sigrid Smuda	West Germany	4:53.55	+21.42	
20	10	o	Lisbeth Korsmo	Norway	4:54.95	+22.82	
21	7	i	Miyoshi Kato	Japan	4:57.39	+25.26	
22	13	o	Kim Yeong-Hui	South Korea	4:58.41	+26.28	
23	14	i	Pat Durnin	Canada	4:58.42	+26.29	
24	12	o	Lee Seong-Ae	South Korea	4:58.77	+26.64	
25	14	o	Yuko Yaegashi-Ota	Japan	5:00.40	+28.87	
26	13	i	Mandy Horsepool	Great Britain	5:08.78	+36.65	
27	12	i	Kong Meiyu	China	5:08.90	+36.77	
28	15	i	Piao Meiji	China	5:19.07	+46.94	
-	5	i	Ria Visser	Netherlands	DNF		
