= 1977 World Allround Speed Skating Championships for women =

International speed skating competition

1977 World Allround Speed Skating Championships for Women
- Venue: Speed & Figure Skating Centre, Keystone, Colorado, United States
- Dates: 12–13 February
- Competitors: 23 skaters from 10 countries

Medalist women
1st place, gold medalist(s)		Vera Brindzej	SOV
2nd place, silver medalist(s)		Galina Stepanskaya	SOV
3rd place, bronze medalist(s)		Galina Nikitina	SOV

The 38th edition of the World Allround Speed Skating Championships 1977 took place on 12 and 13 February in Keystone, Colorado.

Title holder was Sylvia Burka from the USA.

== Distance medalists ==
Event	Gold (gold)	Silver (silver)	Bronze (bronze)
500 m	Vera Bryndzei	Paula-Irmeli Halonen	Beth Heiden
1500 m	Galina Stepanskaya	Sylvia Burka	Vera Bryndzei
1000 m	Vera Bryndzei	Sylvia Burka	Galina Nikitina
3000 m	Galina Stepanskaya	Beth Heiden	Galina Nikitina

== Classification ==
Rank	Skater	Country	Points Samalog	500m	1500m	1000m	3000m
1st place, gold medalist(s)	Vera Bryndzei	Soviet Union	177.085	41.7 (gold)	2:12.43 (3)	1:25.27 (gold)	4:51.64 (5)
2nd place, silver medalist(s)	Galina Stepanskaya	Soviet Union	178.297	43.5 (15)	2:11.85 (gold)	1:26.21 (4)	4:46.45 (gold)
3rd place, bronze medalist(s)	Galina Nikitina	Soviet Union	178.624	42.8 (6)	2:14.36 (5)	1:25.91 (3)	4:48.49 (3)
4	Beth Heiden	United States	179.107	42.5 (3)	2:14.40 (6)	1:27.47 (9)	4:48.43 (2)
5	Haitske Pijlman	Netherlands	181.057	42.8 (6)	2:14.91 (10)	1:26.58 (5)	4:59.98 (8)
6	Lisbeth Korsmo-Berg	Norway	181.147	43.0 (9)	2:14.33 (4)	1:29.60 (18)	4:51.42 (4)
7	Kim Kostron	United States	182.190	43.0 (9)	2:14.78 (9)	1:26.94 (6)	5:04.76 (12)
8	Annie Borckink	Netherlands	182.229	43.3 (13)	2:14.51 (7)	1:27.75 (10)	5:01.30 (9)
9	Galina Blinkova	Soviet Union	182.240	43.2 (12)	2:17.67 (14)	1:27.24 (7)	4:57.18 (6)
10	Pat Durnin	Canada	182.573	43.1 (11)	2:14.91 (10)	1:28.06 (12)	5:02.84 (10)
11	Sijtje van der Lende	Netherlands	182.925	44.4 (11)	2:14.75 (8)	1:27.31 (8)	4:59.72 (7)
12	Paula-Irmeli Halonen	Finland	183.204	42.2 (2)	2:16.58 (12)	1:28.01 (11)	5:08.83 (13)
13	Sylvia Filipsson	Sweden	185.054	43.9 (19)	2:18.11 (15)	1:28.75 (17)	5:04.45 (11)
14	Cindy Seikkula	United States	185.892	43.3 (13)	2:18.5 (16)	1:28.51 (15)	5:12.84 (14)
15	Sylvia Burka	Canada	187.320	42.8 (6)	2:12.01 (2)	1:25.67 (2)	5:46.09 * (16)
16	Joke van Rijssel	Netherlands	187.897	43.7 (18)	2:16.97 (13)	1:28.46 (13)	5:25.86 * (15)
NC17	Kathy Vogt	Canada	134.807	43.5 (15)	2:21.17 (19)	1:28.50 (14)	–
NC18	Makiko Nagaya	Japan	134.840	42.6 (4)	2:21.06 (18)	1:30.44 (20)	–
NC19	Ann-Sofie Järnström	Sweden	135.283	43.5 (15)	2:22.30 (20)	1:28.70 (16)	–
NC20	Anna Lenner	Sweden	135.493	42.7 (5)	2:23.59 (22)	1:29.86 (19)	–
NC21	Nancy Swider	United States	136.127	44.3 (20)	2:19.16 (17)	1:30.88 (22)	–
NC22	Janne Tenmann	Norway	137.473	44.6 (23)	2:22.33 (21)	1:30.86 (21)	–
NC23	Brigitte Flierl	West Germany	138.301	44.4 (21)	2:23.84 (23)	1:31.91 (23)	–

* = Fell

== Attribution ==
In Dutch
