= Speed skating at the 1980 Winter Olympics – Men's 1000 metres =

Speed skating at the Olympics

Men's 1000 metres at the XIII Olympic Winter Games
- Pictogram for speed skating
- Venue: James B. Sheffield Olympic Skating Rink
- Dates: February 19, 1980
- Competitors: 41 from 19 nations
- Winning time: 1:15.18

Medalists
1st place, gold medalist(s)		Eric Heiden; United States
2nd place, silver medalist(s)		Gaétan Boucher; Canada
3rd place, bronze medalist(s)		Vladimir Lobanov; Soviet Union
3rd place, bronze medalist(s)		Frode Rønning; Norway

The men's 1000 metres in speed skating at the 1980 Winter Olympics took place on 19 February, at the James B. Sheffield Olympic Skating Rink.

== Records ==
Prior to this competition, the existing world and Olympic records were as follows:

World record	Eric Heiden (USA)	1:13.60	Davos, Switzerland	13 January 1980
Olympic record	Peter Mueller (USA)	1:19.32	Innsbruck, Austria	12 February 1976

The following new Olympic record was set.

Date	Pair	Athlete	Country	Time	OR	WR
19 February	Pair 1	Eric Heiden	United States	1:15.18	OR	

== Results ==
Rank	Pair	Lane	Athlete	Country	Time	Time behind	Notes
1st place, gold medalist(s)	1	i	Eric Heiden	United States	1:15.18	–	OR
2nd place, silver medalist(s)	1	o	Gaétan Boucher	Canada	1:16.68	+1.50	
3rd place, bronze medalist(s)	4	i	Vladimir Lobanov	Soviet Union	1:16.91	+1.73	
3rd place, bronze medalist(s)	3	i	Frode Rønning	Norway	1:16.91	+1.73	
5	5	o	Peter Mueller	United States	1:17.11	+1.93	
6	4	o	Bert de Jong	Netherlands	1:17.29	+2.11	
7	18	o	Andreas Dietel	East Germany	1:17.71	+2.53	
8	10	o	Oloph Granath	Sweden	1:17.74	+2.56	
9	5	i	Sergey Khlebnikov	Soviet Union	1:17.96	+2.78	
10	3	o	Lieuwe de Boer	Netherlands	1:17.97	+2.79	
11	6	i	Craig Kressler	United States	1:18.37	+3.19	
12	7	i	Terje Andersen	Norway	1:18.52	+3.34	
13	15	o	Jan Józwik	Poland	1:18.83	+3.65	
14	20	o	Pertti Niittylä	Finland	1:18.85	+3.67	
15	19	i	Anatoly Medennikov	Soviet Union	1:18.92	+3.74	
16	2	i	Jan-Åke Carlberg	Sweden	1:19.13	+3.95	
17	2	o	Jan Egil Storholt	Norway	1:19.34	+4.16	
18	9	o	Emmanuel Michon	France	1:19.43	+4.25	
19	15	i	Kaoru Fukuda	Japan	1:19.66	+4.48	
20	6	o	Jacques Thibault	Canada	1:19.79	+4.61	
21	8	i	Hilbert van der Duim	Netherlands	1:19.89	+4.71	
22	17	i	Lee Yeong-Ha	South Korea	1:20.04	+4.86	
23	11	o	Masayuki Kawahara	Japan	1:20.88	+5.70	
24	14	i	Zhao Weichang	China	1:20.97	+5.79	
25	8	o	Kazuaki Ichimura	Japan	1:21.05	+5.87	
26	7	o	Steffen Doering	East Germany	1:21.19	+6.01	
27	14	o	Craig Webster	Canada	1:21.47	+6.29	
28	18	i	Giovanni Paganin	Italy	1:21.50	+6.32	
29	16	i	Colin Coates	Australia	1:21.68	+6.50	
30	20	i	Jukka Salmela	Finland	1:21.78	+6.60	
31	18	i	Vasile Coroş	Romania	1:21.89	+6.71	
32	17	o	Li Huchun	China	1:22.10	+6.92	
33	13	o	Dezideriu Jenei	Romania	1:22.66	+7.48	
34	20	i	Mike Richmond	Australia	1:23.30	+8.12	
35	12	i	Esa Puolakka	Finland	1:23.54	+8.36	
36	12	o	Wang Nianchun	China	1:24.20	+9.02	
37	16	o	Tömörbaataryn Nyamdavaa	Mongolia	1:24.84	+9.66	
38	19	o	Dorjiin Tsenddoo	Mongolia	1:27.00	+11.82	
39	9	i	Herbert Schwarz	West Germany	1:44.23	+29.05	
40	13	i	Archie Marshall	Great Britain	2:00.93	+45.75	
-	11	i	Johan Granath	Sweden	DNF		
