= Kim Young-hee =

- Hangul: 김영희
- RR: Gim Yeonghui
- MR: Kim Yŏnghŭi

Kim Young-hee (Korean: 김영희), also spelled Kim Yeong-hui, is a Korean name consisting of the family name Kim and the given name Young-hee, and may also refer to:

- Kim Young-hee (speed skater) (born 1955), South Korean speed skater
- Kim Young-hee (rower) (born 1962), South Korean rower
- Kim Young-hee (basketball) (1963–2023), South Korean basketball player
- Kim Young-hee (comedian) (born 1983), South Korean comedian

== See also ==
- Kim Yong-hee (disambiguation) (Korean: 김용희; RR: Gim Yonghui; MR: Kim Yonghŭi)
