= Sabine Becker =

German speed skater (born 1959)

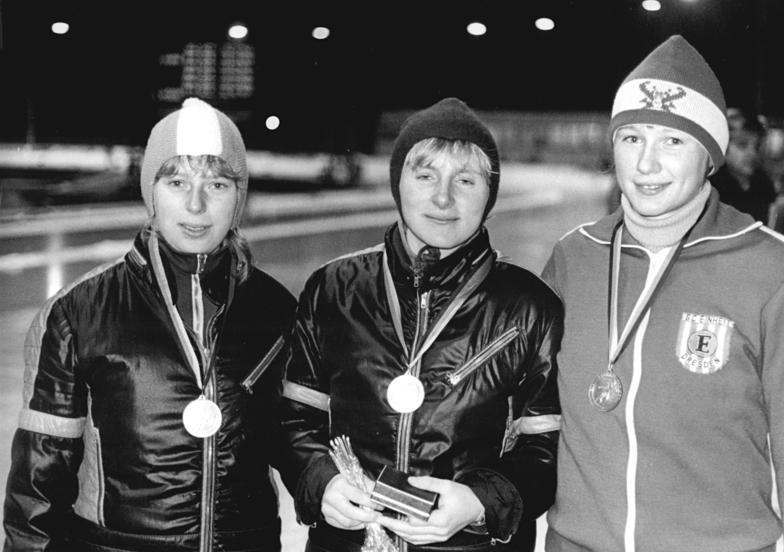
- Albrecht (left), Becker (middle), Karin Kanis (right)

Personal information
- Born: 13 August 1959 (age 67) Karl-Marx-Stadt, East Germany

Sport
- Country: East Germany
- Sport: Speed skating
Medal record
Representing East Germany
World Championships
| Silver medal – second place | 1980 Lake Placid | 3000 m |
| Bronze medal – third place | 1980 Lake Placid | 1500 m |

Sabine Becker (born 13 August 1959) is a German speed skater who competed for East Germany in the 1980 Winter Olympics.

She was born in Karl-Marx-Stadt.

In 1980 she won the silver medal in the 3000 metres event and the bronze medal in the 1500 metres competition.

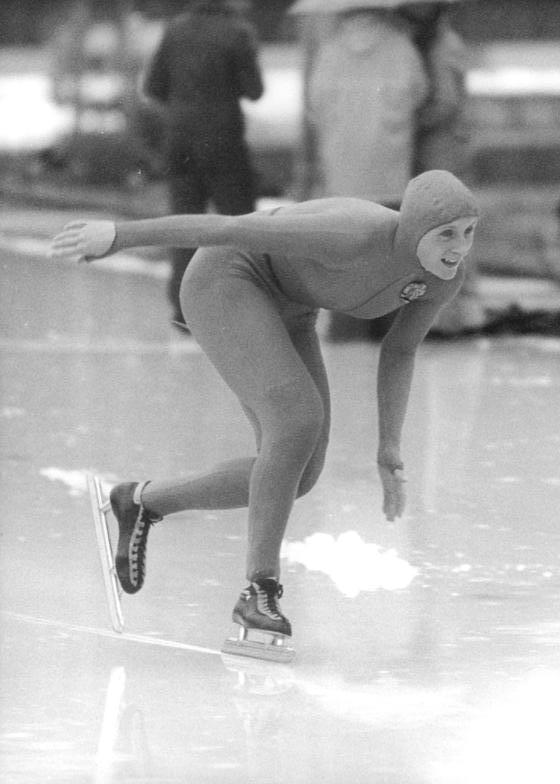
Becker in 1975: winning the 1000 metres event, her second national championship.
