= Young-hee =

- Hangul: 영희
- RR: Yeonghui
- MR: Yŏnghŭi

Young-hee, also spelled Young-hi, Yong-hui or Yong-hi, is a Korean given name. Young-hee was the third-most popular name for newborn girls in South Korea in 1950, falling to ninth place by 1960.

People with this name include:

== Academics and artists ==
- Lee Young-hee (designer) (1936–2018), South Korean hanbok designer
- Younghi Pagh-Paan (born 1945), South Korean-born German composer
- Chang Young-hee (1952–2009), South Korean writer
- Lee Young-hee (physicist) (born 1955), South Korean physicist
- Yang Yong-hi (born 1964), Japanese-born Korean writer
- Young-Hee Chan, South Korean-born Australian classical double-bassist

== Entertainers ==
- Ko Yong-hui (1951–2004), North Korean dancer, mistress of Kim Jong-il and mother of Kim Jong-un
- Na Young-hee (born 1961), South Korean actress
- Seo Young-hee (born 1980), South Korean actress
- Kim Young-hee (comedian) (born 1983), South Korean comedian

== Sportspeople ==
- Kim Yeong-hui (speed skater) (born 1955), South Korean speed skater
- Kim Yeong-hui (rower) (born 1962), South Korean rower
- Kim Young-hee (basketball) (born 1963), South Korean basketball player
- Pak Yong-hui (born 1970), North Korean sport shooter
- Han Yeong-hui (born 1973), South Korean swimmer
- Moon Young-hui (born 1983), South Korean field hockey player
- Son Young-hee (born 1993), South Korean weightlifter

== Fictional characters ==
- Young-hee, the animatronic doll featured in Squid Game.
- One of the dummy names for the questions in Arirang TV quiz show, Superkids

== See also ==
- List of Korean given names
- Kim Yong-hee (disambiguation), for people with Yong (용) rather than Yeong (영) in the first syllable of their given name
