= Cornelia Jacob =

German speed skater

Personal information
- Nationality: German
- Born: 3 April 1960 (age 64); Halle, East Germany

Sport
- Sport: Speed skating

Cornelia Jacob (born 3 April 1960) is a German speed skater. She competed in the women's 500 metres at the 1980 Winter Olympics.
