= Vladimir Lobanov =

Russian speed skater

Olympic medal record

Men's Speed Skating
Bronze medal – third place	1980 Lake Placid	1000 m

Vladimir Vladimirovich Lobanov (Russian: Владимир Владимирович Лобанов; December 26, 1953 – August 29, 2007) was a Russian speed skater who competed for the Soviet Union in the 1980 Winter Olympics, in European and World all round championships between 1977 and 1979, and in Sprint World Championships 1981 and 1982.

In 1980 he won the bronze medal in the 1000 metres event. In the 1500 metres competition he finished eighth. He placed fifth in both the World and the European all round Championships 1978, and in the Sprint World Championships 1981.
