= North Korea at the 1984 Winter Olympics =

- IOC code: PRK
- NOC: Olympic Committee of the Democratic People's Republic of Korea

in Sarajevo
- Competitors: 6 (3 men, 3 women) in 1 sport
- Flag bearer: Im Ri-Bin
- Medals: Gold 0 Silver 0 Bronze 0 Total 0

Winter Olympics appearances (overview)
- 1964; 1968; 1972; 1976–1980; 1984; 1988; 1992; 1994; 1998; 2002; 2006; 2010; 2014; 2018; 2022; 2026; 2030

Other related appearances
- Korea (2018)

North Korea competed as the Democratic People's Republic of Korea at the 1984 Winter Olympics in Sarajevo, Yugoslavia.

== Speed skating ==
Men

Event	Athlete	Race	
Event	Athlete	Time	Rank
500 m	Kim Song-Hi	41.23	37
1000 m	Kim Gwang-hyun	1:22.26	38
1000 m	Kim Song-Hi	1:22.04	36
1000 m	Im Li-bin	1:21.16	35
1500 m	Kim Gwang-hyun	2:06.80	36
1500 m	Im Li-bin	2:03.93	31
5000 m	Kim Gwang-hyun	7:46.12	33
5000 m	Im Li-bin	7:37.49	23
10,000 m	Im Li-bin	15:45.19	29

Women

Event	Athlete	Race	
Event	Athlete	Time	Rank
1000 m	Han Chun-ok	1:29.30	29
1000 m	Pak Gum-yeen	1:27.86	19
1500 m	Kim Chang-hae	2:17.37	25
1500 m	Han Chun-ok	2:14.25	20
1500 m	Pak Gum-yeen	2:14.23	19
3000 m	Kim Chang-hae	4:58.41	20
3000 m	Han Chun-ok	4:51.91	17
3000 m	Pak Gum-yeen	4:49.26	16
