= Tetiana Tarasova =

Ukrainian speed skater

Personal information
- Nationality: Ukrainian
- Born: 8 November 1957 (age 67); Astana, Soviet Union

Sport
- Sport: Speed skating

Tetiana Tarasova (born 8 November 1957) is a Ukrainian speed skater. She competed in the women's 500 metres at the 1980 Winter Olympics, representing the Soviet Union.
