= Tatyana Shelekhova =

Ukrainian speed skater

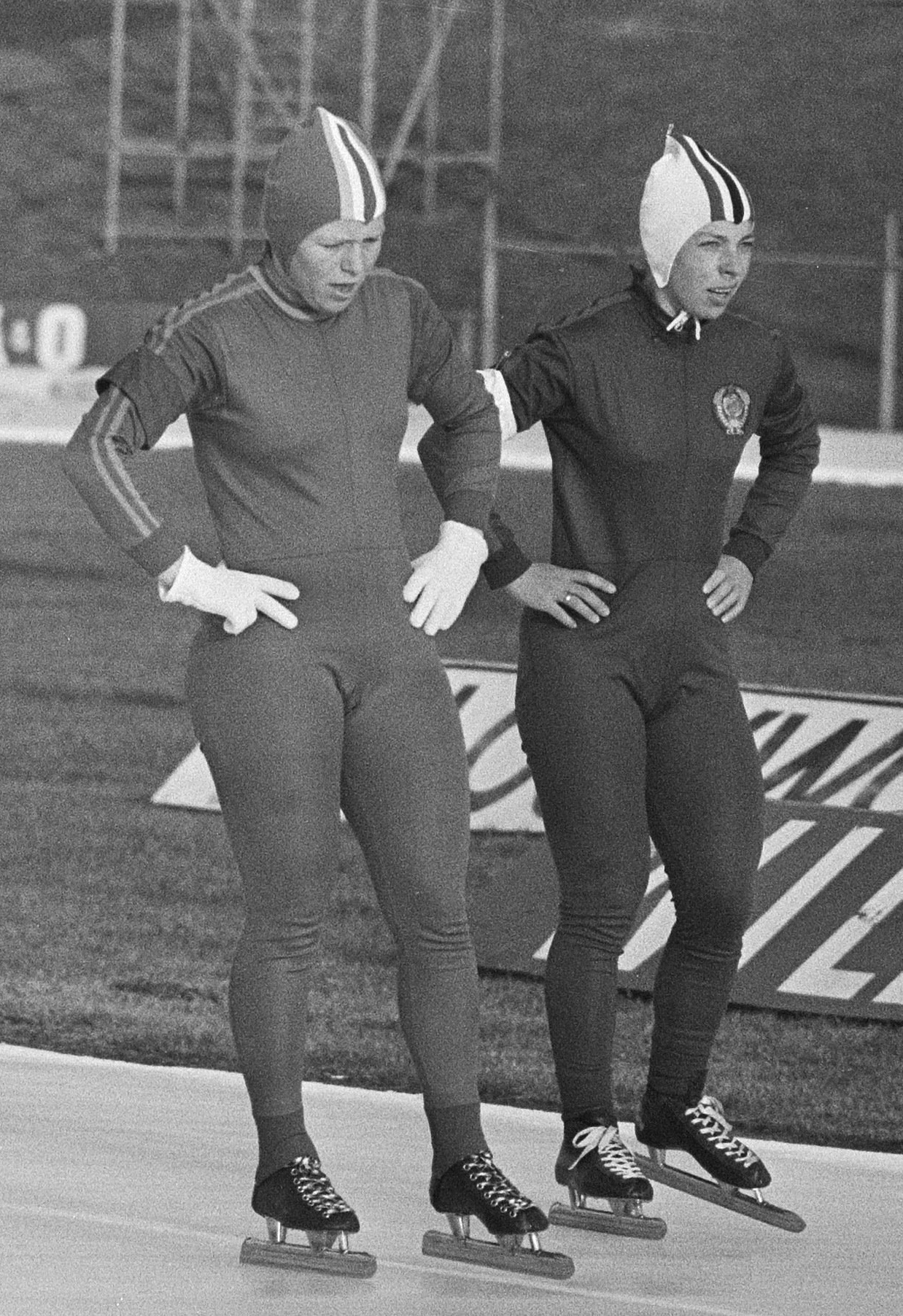
- Annie Borckink (left) and Tatyana Shelekhova in 1976

Personal information
- Born: 4 April 1946 (age 80) Kiev, USSR
- Height: 1.60 m (5 ft 3 in)

Sport
- Sport: Speed skating
- Club: Avangard Kyiv

Tatyana Rastopshyna-Shelekhova (Ukrainian: Тетяна Шелехова; born 4 April 1946). She won a silver allround medal at the world championships in 1973 and a bronze allround medal at the European championships in 1974. She competed in 1000 m and 3000 m at the 1976 Winter Olympics and finished in 15th and 14th place, respectively.

She won two national titles in 1973, in 1000 m and 1500 m. Allround she finished second in 1972 and 1974 and third in 1973.

Personal bests:

- 500 m – 43.50 (1974)
- 1000 m – 1:26.8 (1973)
- 1500 m – 2:14.3 (1973)
- 3000 m – 4:47.0 (1973)
- 5000 m – 8:48.3 (1976)
