= Kim Gwang-hyun =

North Korean speed skater (born 1967)

Personal information
- Nationality: North Korean
- Born: 24 November 1967 (age 57)

Sport
- Sport: Speed skating

Kim Gwang-hyun (born 24 November 1967) is a North Korean speed skater. He competed in three events at the 1984 Winter Olympics.
