= Kim Yong-hee =

Kim Yong-hee may refer to:

- Kim Yong-hee (baseball) (born 1955), manager of the South Korean professional baseball club SK Wyverns
- Kim Yong-hee (actor) (born 1973), South Korean actor
- Kim Yong-hee (footballer) (born 1978), South Korean football player
- Kim Yong-hee (born 2000), South Korean singer, member of CIX
- Kim Yong-hee (activist), South Korean labor rights activist and protester
