= Monika Zernicek =

German speed skater

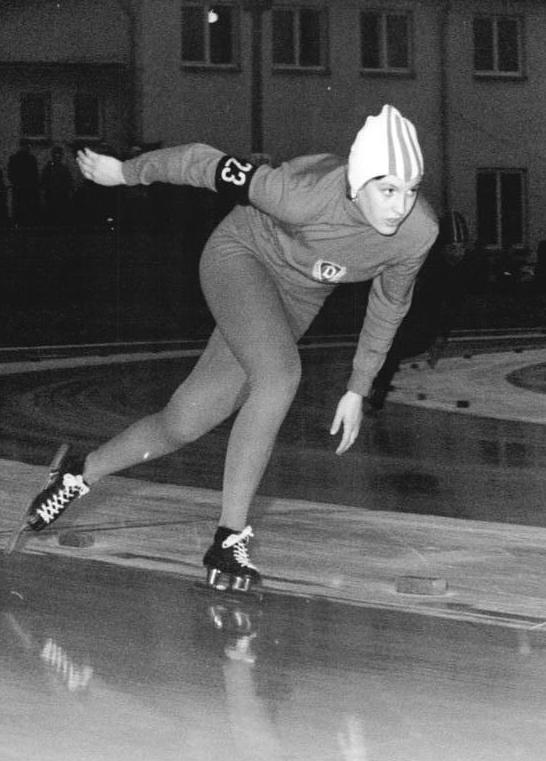
- Monika Zernicek in 1973

Personal information
- Nationality: East Germany
- Born: 18 October 1954 (age 70); West Berlin, West Germany

Sport
- Sport: Speed skating

Monika Zernicek (born 18 October 1954) is a German speed skater. She competed in the women's 1000 metres at the 1976 Winter Olympics representing East Germany.
