= Wang Limei =

Chinese speed skater (born 1961)

Personal information
- Full name: 王丽梅
- Nationality: Chinese
- Born: 30 March 1961 (age 63)

Sport
- Sport: Speed skating

Wang Limei (born 30 March 1961) is a Chinese speed skater. She competed in the women's 500 metres at the 1980 Winter Olympics.
