= Zhang Li (speed skater) =

Chinese speed skater

Zhang Li (Chinese: 张丽, born 7 November 1963) is a former Chinese speed skater who participated in the 1980 Winter Olympics where she finished in 31st at the 1000 metres race.
