= Shen Zhenshu =

Chinese speed skater

Personal information
- Nationality: Chinese
- Born: 18 July 1961 (age 63)

Sport
- Sport: Speed skating

Shen Zhenshu (born 18 July 1961) is a Chinese speed skater. She competed in the women's 1000 metres at the 1980 Winter Olympics.
