= Chen Shuhua (speed skater) =

Chinese speed skater

Personal information
- Full name: 陈淑华
- Nationality: Chinese
- Born: 20 May 1958 (age 66)

Sport
- Sport: Speed skating

Chen Shuhua (Chinese: 陈淑华, born 20 May 1958) is a Chinese speed skater. She competed in the women's 1500 metres at the 1980 Winter Olympics.
