= Piao Dongyi =

Chinese alpine skier (born 1947)

Personal information
- Full name: 朴东锡
- Nationality: Chinese
- Born: 11 May 1947 (age 78) Tonghua, Jilin, China

Sport
- Sport: Alpine skiing

Piao Dongyi (Chinese: 朴东锡; Chinese: 朴東錫; pinyin: Piáo Dōngxī; born 11 May 1947) or Park Dong-seok (Korean: 박동석) is a retired Chinese alpine skier. He competed in two events at the 1980 Winter Olympics.

== Biography ==
Piao was born in Tonghua on 11 May 1947. When he was 12 years old, he attended Tonghua Ski School (Chinese: 通化市滑雪学校). For 10 years in the 1970s, Piao won numerous domestic competitions. Xinhua News Agency said he "became a pinnacle of alpine skiing in China" during that era. When he was 33 years old, he was chosen to be on China's national team for alpine skiing. In November 1979, Piao accompanied his team to do training in Japan. He competed at the 1980 Winter Olympics in Lake Placid, New York, representing the People's Republic of China at its first-ever Winter Olympics. During the men's slalom event, Piao finished 34th out of 37. He retired from competition after the 1980 Olympics.

In 1971, Piao married cross-country skier Zhang Guizhen (Chinese: 张桂珍), whom he had met while they were training together. They have two children: a daughter, Piao Xueli (Chinese: 朴雪俐), and a son, Piao Xuefeng (Chinese: 朴雪峰). He founded the Snow Wind ski club (Chinese: 风雪行) in Tonghua in 2008 and established a ski gear shop. He repaired ski equipment and ran free skiing classes. During winters, Piao trains an amateur ski club team as their head coach. He was a resident of Tonghua in 2021.
