= Ren Guiping =

Chinese cross-country skier

Personal information
- Full name: 任桂平
- Nationality: Chinese
- Born: 2 April 1960 (age 64)

Sport
- Sport: Cross-country skiing

Ren Guiping (born 2 April 1960) is a Chinese cross-country skier. She competed in two events at the 1980 Winter Olympics.
