= Piao Meiji =

Chinese speed skater

Personal information
- Full name: 朴美姬
- Nationality: Chinese
- Born: 27 December 1957 (age 67); Yanji, Yanbian Korean Autonomous Prefecture, Jilin, China

Sport
- Sport: Speed skating

Piao Meiji (Chinese: 朴美姬; pinyin: Piáo Měijī, born 27 December 1957) or Park Mi-hee (Hangul: 박미희) is a Chinese speed skater. She competed in the women's 3000 metres at the 1980 Winter Olympics.
