= Lydia Stephans =

American speed skater

Lydia Murphy-Stephans
Personal information
- Birth name: Lydia Stephans
- Nationality: American
- Born: October 19, 1960 (age 64); Chicago, Illinois, United States

Sport
- Sport: Speed skating

Lydia Murphy-Stephans (born October 19, 1960) is an American speed skater, television producer, sports media pioneer, and CEO of SportsBubble. She competed in the women's 1000 metres at the 1984 Winter Olympics. Following a short international career in speed skating, Murphy-Stephans worked for several television networks, including ABC Sports, and has gone on to win multiple Emmy Awards. She was the first woman to run a national sporting network in the United States.

== Biography ==
Murphy-Stephans was born in Chicago, Illinois, in 1960. She was inspired to take up speed skating, after watching the 1972 Winter Olympics on the television. In 1976, Murphy-Stephans won the junior National Short Track Championship title. Six years later, she won the senior National Short Track Championship title and the North American Short Track Championship in the following year. In 1982, she graduated from National Louis University, and three years later, earned a master's degree at Northwestern University.

Between 1980 and 1984, Murphy-Stephans won four medals, one silver and three bronze, at the World Short Track Speed Skating Championships. At the 1985 Winter Universiade, she also won two silver medals. At the 1984 Winter Olympics in Sarajevo, Murphy-Stephans competed in the women's 1000 metres event, finishing in 13th place. Following the Olympics, Murphy-Stephans served as the national short track coach at the US Olympic Education Center. In 1994, she was inducted into the National Speedskating Hall of Fame.

In 1986, Murphy-Stephans began working at ABC Sports, where she later became the first female vice-president of the organisation. While at ABC, she was in charge of their show Wide World of Sports. By the end of the 1990s, Murphy-Stephans had moved to the television network Oxygen, in the role of President and Executive Producer. Three years later, she moved on to the MSG Network as their Executive Vice-president. In 2006, Murphy-Stephans had left MSG to form her own company, Peace Tree Media.

In 2022, Murphy-Stephans founded SportsBubble, an internet-based company that provides software, marketing and services. With the launch of SportsBubble, Murphy-Stephans released the company's first product, the WatchSports app.
