= Galina Nikitina =

Personal information
- Nationality: Soviet
- Born: 1952 (age 73–74)

Sport
- Sport: Speed skating
Medal record
Representing Soviet Union
Women's speed skating
World Championships
| Bronze medal – third place | 1977 Keystone | Allround |

Galina Nikitina (Russian: Галина Никитина; born 1952) is a former Soviet female speed skater. She won a bronze medal at the World Allround Speed Skating Championships for Women in 1977.
