= Sylvia Albrecht =

German speed skater

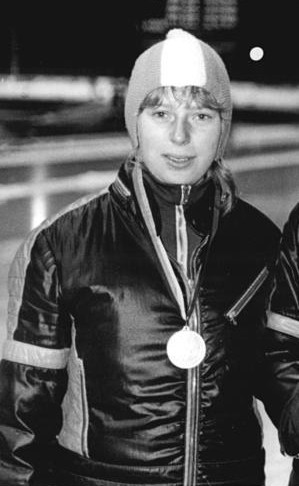
- Albrecht in 1979

Personal information
- Born: 28 October 1962 (age 63) Berlin, East Germany

Sport
- Country: East Germany
- Sport: Speed skating
Medal record
Women's speed skating
Representing East Germany
Olympic Games
Bronze medal – third place	1980 Lake Placid	1000 m

Sylvia Albrecht (later Heckendorf, born 28 October 1962) is a German speed skater who competed for East Germany in the 1980 Winter Olympics.

She was born in East Berlin. In 1980 she won the bronze medal in the 1000 metres event. In the 1500 metres competition she finished ninth and in the 3000 metres contest she finished 14th.
