= Pat Durnin =

Canadian speed skater

Personal information
- Born: 4 August 1959 (age 66) Winnipeg, Manitoba, Canada

Sport
- Sport: Speed skating

Pat Durnin (born 4 August 1959) is a Canadian speed skater. She competed in the women's 3000 metres at the 1980 Winter Olympics.
