= Song Yongjun =

Chinese biathlete

Personal information
- Full name: 宋永军
- Nationality: Chinese
- Born: 3 February 1959 (age 66)

Sport
- Sport: Biathlon

Song Yongjun (born 3 February 1959) is a Chinese biathlete. He competed at the 1980 Winter Olympics and the 1984 Winter Olympics.
