= Natalya Glebova =

Russian speed skater

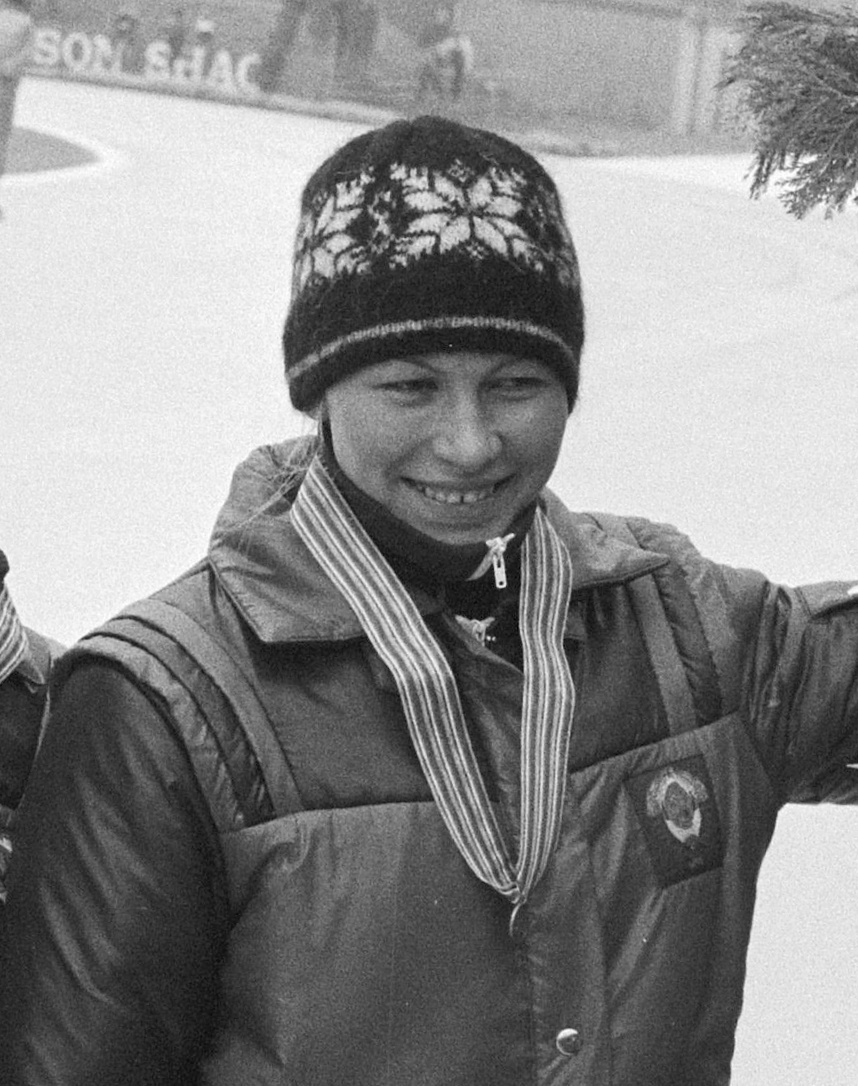
- Natalya Glebova in 1982

Personal information
- Born: 30 April 1963 (age 63) Kemerovo, Russian SFSR, Soviet Union
- Height: 1.73 m (5 ft 8 in)
- Weight: 66 kg (146 lb)

Sport
- Sport: Speed skating
- Club: Spartak Kemerovo
Medal record
Winter Olympics
Bronze medal – third place	1984 Sarajevo	500 m

Natalya Glebova (née Shive, Russian: Наталья Глебова, née Шиве, born 30 April 1963) is a Russian speed skater who competed for the Soviet Union in the 1984 and 1988 Winter Olympics. In 1984 she won the bronze medal in the 500 m event. In the 1000 m competition she finished 37th. Four years later she finished ninth in the 500 m contest and 20th in the 1000 m event.

Her first international competitions were the 1982 European Championships where she won three bronze medals (all-around, 1,000 m and 1,500 m) and a silver medal in the 500 m. Next year she won a silver and a gold medal in the 500 m at the European and World All-around Championships, respectively, and finished eights overall. At the 1984 World Championships she again won silver in the 500 m. During her career, Glebova won six national titles: all-around in 1983, sprint all-around in 1984, 1,000 m in 1982 and 1984, 3,000 m in 1983, and 5,000 m in 1983. She retired after the 1988 Olympics.

Personal bests:

- 500 m – 40.39 (1983)
- 1000 m – 1:22.22 (1984)
- 1500 m – 2:09.36 (1982)
- 3000 m – 4:37.97 (1983)
- 5000 m – 8:07.20 (1983)
