= Wang Yumjie =

Chinese biathlete

Personal information
- Nationality: Chinese
- Born: 29 July 1950 (age 74)

Sport
- Sport: Biathlon

Wang Yumjie (Chinese: 王允杰; pinyin: Wáng Yǔnjié, born 29 July 1950) is a Chinese biathlete. He competed in the 20 km individual event at the 1980 Winter Olympics.
