= Ria Visser =

Dutch speed skater (born 1961)

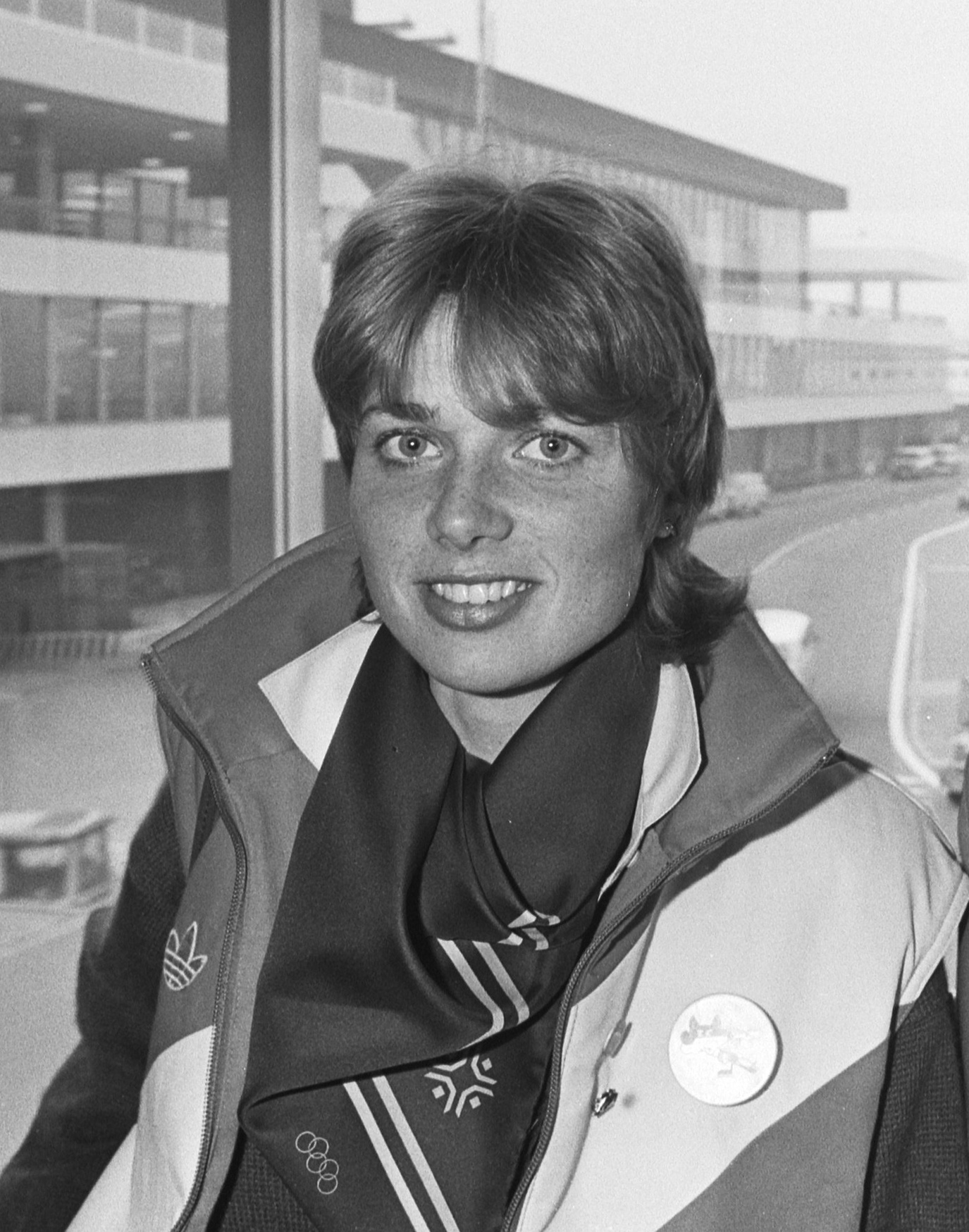
- Visser in 1984

Personal information
- Born: 20 July 1961 (age 64) Oud-Beijerland, Netherlands
- Height: 1.67 m (5 ft 6 in)
- Weight: 52 kg (115 lb)

Sport
- Sport: Speed skating
Medal record
Women's speed skating
Representing the Netherlands
Olympic Games
Silver medal – second place	1980 Lake Placid	1500 metres

Adriana Johanna "Ria" Visser (born 20 July 1961) is a Dutch ice speed skater.

== Career ==
Visser participated in six World Allround Speed Skating Championships, performing best at her first attempt in 1979, when she came in 6th. In 1979 and 1980, she won the bronze medal in the World Junior Speed Skating Championships. At the 1980 Winter Olympics in Lake Placid she won the silver medal in the women's 1500 metres, finishing just behind her Dutch teammate Annie Borckink. At the 1984 Winter Olympics she raced three distances, but did not reach higher than a 13th place. Unlike in international events, Visser was very successful at the Dutch National Allround Championships, winning the event five times and coming in second twice. Only Stien Kaiser has been more successful at the national level.

In the 1990s, she was a TV commentator for the Dutch sports program NOS Studio Sport.

== Personal records ==
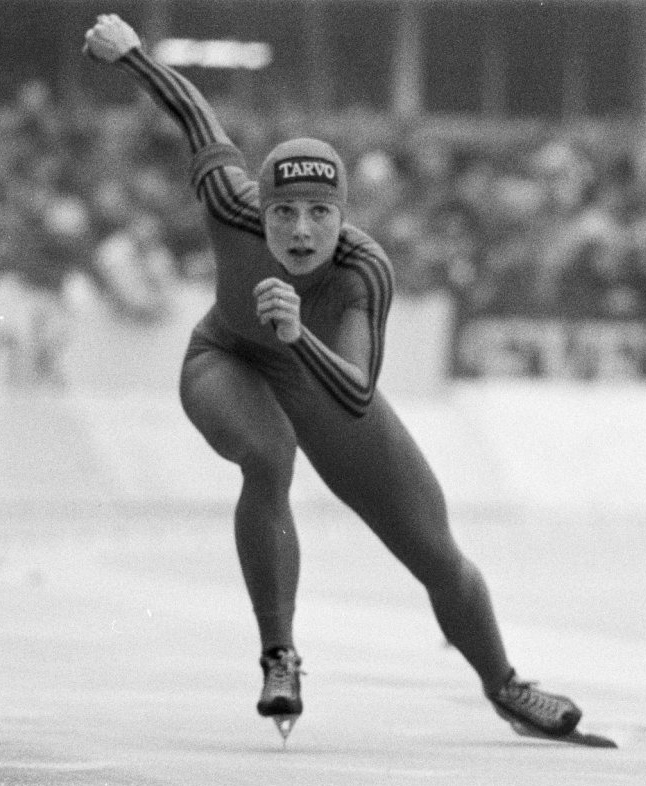
Ria Visser in 1983

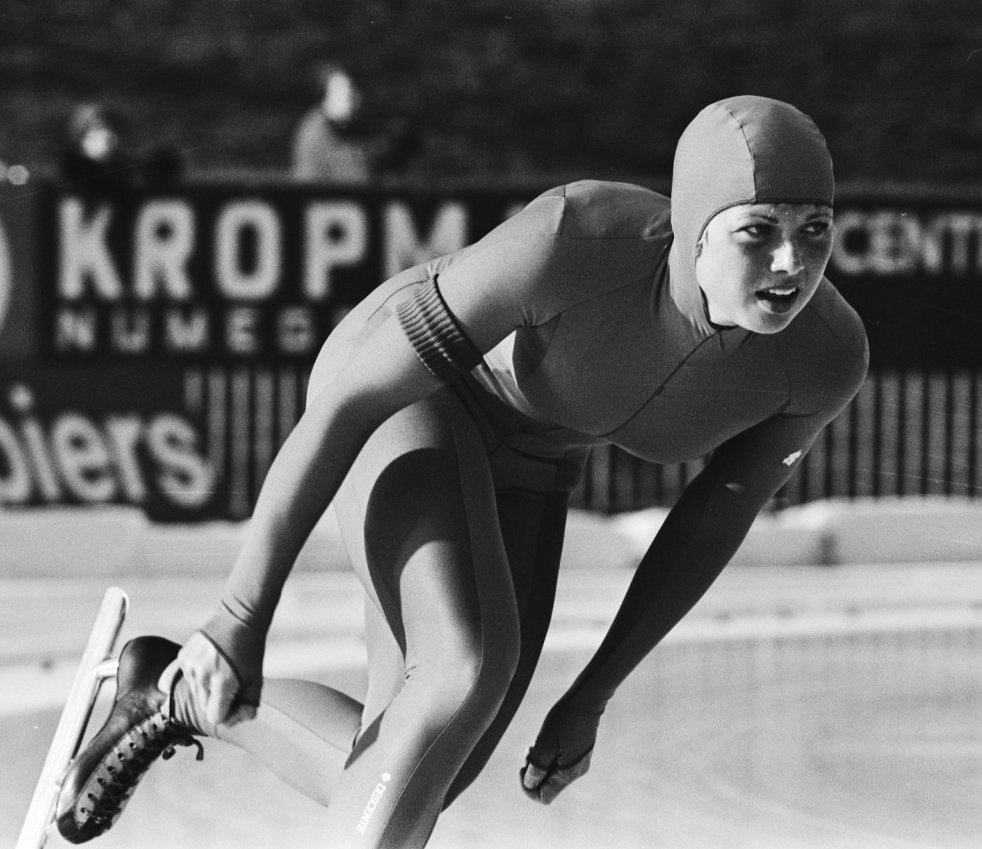
Ria Visser in 1980

Personal records
Women's speed skating
Event	Result	Date	Location	Notes
500m	42.23	17 December 1983	Inzell	
1000m	1:25.76	27 December 1981	Inzell	
1500m	2:07.06	17 December 1983	Inzell	
3000m	4:29.13	26 December 1984	Inzell	
5000m	7:40.68	6 December 1987	Calgary	

== Tournament overview ==
Season	Dutch Championships Single Distances	Dutch Championships Allround	Dutch Championships Sprint	European Championships Allround	Olympic Games	World Championships Allround	World Championships Sprint	World Championships Junior Allround
1978–79		HEERENVEEN 6th 500m (silver) 3000m (bronze) 1500m (gold) 5000m (silver) overall				THE HAGUE 17th 500m 4th 3000m 13th 1500m (bronze) 5000m 6th overall		GRENOBLE 9th 500m (bronze) 1500m (bronze) 1000m (bronze) 3000m (bronze) overall
1979–80		THE HAGUE 6th 500m (gold) 3000m (bronze) 1500m (gold) 5000m (gold) overall			LAKE PLACID (silver) 1500m DNF 3000m	HAMAR 28th 500m 7th 3000m 24th 1500m 8th 5000m 14th overall	WEST ALLIS 28th 500m 7th 1000m 22nd 500m 29th 1000m** 27th overall	ASSEN 13th 500m (silver) 1500m 6th 1000m 4th 3000m (bronze) overall
1980–81		ASSEN 7th 500m 5th 3000m 6th 1500m (gold) 5000m 5th overall						
1981–82		HEERENVEEN (silver) 500m (gold) 3000m (silver) 1500m (gold) 5000m (silver) overall		HEERENVEEN 19th 500m 10th 3000m 13th 1500m 10th 3000m 12th overall				
1982–83		DEVENTER 6th 500m (gold) 3000m (gold) 1500m (silver) 5000m (gold) overall	UTRECHT 15th 500m 5th 1000m 8th 500m 23rd 1000m 23rd overall	HEERENVEEN 20th 500m 11th 3000m 9th 1500m 10th 5000m 12th overall		KARL-MARX-STADT 19th 500m 8th 3000m 5th 1500m 7th 5000m 9th overall		
1983–84		GRONINGEN 8th 500m (gold) 3000m (gold) 1500m (gold) 5000m (gold) overall			SARAJEVO 30th 500m 13th 1500m 25th 3000m	DEVENTER 11th 500m 8th 3000m 11th 1500m 10th 5000m 11th overall		
1984–85		ALKMAAR (bronze) 500m (gold) 3000m (gold) 1500m (gold) 5000m (gold) overall	UTRECHT 5th 500m (silver) 1000m 5th 500m (bronze) 1000m 4th overall	GRONINGEN 17th 500m 5th 3000m (gold) 1500m (silver) 5000m 4th overall				
1985–86		ASSEN 4th 500m (gold) 3000m 4th 1500m (gold) 5000m (gold) overall	UTRECHT 10th 500m (bronze) 1000m 18th 500m 5th 1000m 18th overall	GEITHUS 18th 500m 7th 3000m 8th 1500m 13th 5000m 10th overall		THE HAGUE 25th 500m 6th 3000m 10th 1500m 6th 5000m 9th overall		
1986–87								
1987–88	HEERENVEEN 8th 1500m (bronze) 3000m 5th 5000m	ALKMAAR 14th 500m (silver) 3000m 12th 1500m 10th 5000m 11th overall						

** fell
