= Ying Zhenshan =

Chinese biathlete

Personal information
- Nationality: Chinese
- Born: 1 October 1956 (age 68)

Sport
- Sport: Biathlon

Ying Zhenshan (Chinese: 尹振山; pinyin: Yǐn Zhènshān, born 1 October 1956) is a Chinese biathlete. He competed in the 20 km individual event at the 1980 Winter Olympics.
