= Kim Yong-hee (activist) =

South Korean labor rights activist and protester

Kim Yong-hee (Korean: 김용희) is a South Korean labor rights activist and protester. He was employed at Samsung Aerospace from 1982 to 1995, when he was dismissed for attempting to organize a labor union. Kim had also claimed that Samsung had filed defamation lawsuits against him, alongside claims of sexual assault and accusations of spying.

Kim began a series of sit-ins and hunger strikes after his firing in 1995, largely focused on Samsung. Since June 2019, he has been living atop a 25-metre (82 ft) traffic camera tower overlooking an intersection in Seoul while protesting Samsung activities. His platform on the tower includes a sleeping bag, placards, a megaphone, and necessary supplies that are replenished by rope. Samsung Electronics vice chairman Lee Jae-yong announced in May 2020 that the company would end its policy of suppressing the creation of labor unions.
