= Gabi Zange =

German speed skater

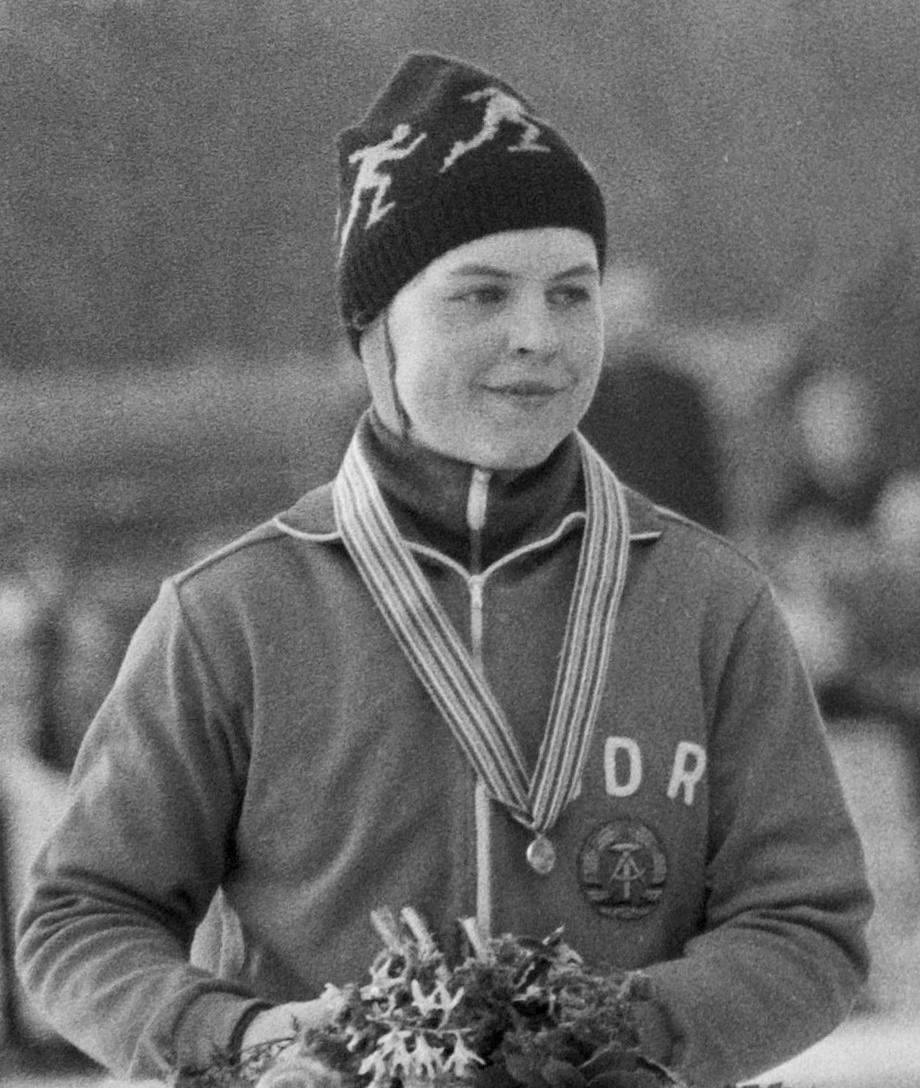
- Gabi Zange in 1981

Personal information
- Born: 1 June 1961 (age 65) Crimmitschau, East Germany
- Height: 1.67 m (5 ft 5 1/2 in)
- Weight: 60 kg (132 lb)

Sport
- Sport: Speed skating
- Club: SC Karl-Marx-Stadt
Medal record
Women's speed skating
Representing East Germany
Olympic Games
Bronze medal – third place	1984 Sarajevo	3000 m
Bronze medal – third place	1988 Calgary	3000 m
Bronze medal – third place	1988 Calgary	5000 m
World Championships
Silver medal – second place	1985 Sarajevo	Allround
Bronze medal – third place	1984 Deventer	Allround
European Championships
Gold medal – first place	1984 Alma-Ata	Allround
Bronze medal – third place	1981 Heerenveen	Allround

Gabriele Zange (née Schönbrunn, born 1 June 1961) is a retired East German speed skater who specialized in the long distances (3000 m and 5000 m), winning three Olympic bronze medals in these events in 1984 and 1988. In 1981 she won a European bronze medal in the 3000 m and later set a world record at the high-altitude rink of Medeo (3000 m, 4:21.70). In 1984, she won European championships, setting two world records, in the 5000 m (7:39.44) and allround, and finished third at the world championships. Next year she won a silver at the world championships, but then had no success until the 1987–88 season, when she set her fourth world record (4:14.76 in the 3000 m) and won two Olympics medals. She retired soon after the 1988 Olympics and worked as a physiotherapist.

Personal bests:

- 500 m – 41:93 (1981)
- 1000 m – 1:22.00 (1988)
- 1500 m – 2:04.98 (1988)
- 3000 m – 4:16.76 (1988)
- 5000 m – 7:21.61 (1988)
