= Wang Nianchun =

Chinese speed skater

Personal information
- Full name: 王年春
- Nationality: Chinese
- Born: 26 October 1956 (age 68)

Sport
- Sport: Speed skating

Wang Nianchun (born 26 October 1956) is a Chinese speed skater. He competed at the 1980 Winter Olympics and the 1984 Winter Olympics.
