= Miao Min =

Chinese speed skater

Personal information
- Nationality: Chinese
- Born: 28 April 1960 (age 64); Heilongjiang, China
- Height: 160 cm (5 ft 3 in)
- Weight: 51 kg (112 lb)

Sport
- Sport: Speed skating

Miao Min (born 28 April 1960) is a Chinese speed skater. She competed in two events at the 1984 Winter Olympics.
