= Wang Guifang =

Chinese speed skater

Personal information
- Nationality: Chinese
- Born: 23 October 1962 (age 62)

Sport
- Sport: Speed skating

Wang Guifang (born 23 October 1962) is a Chinese speed skater. She competed in two events at the 1984 Winter Olympics.
