= Leah Poulos-Mueller =

American speed skater

Leah Poulos Mueller
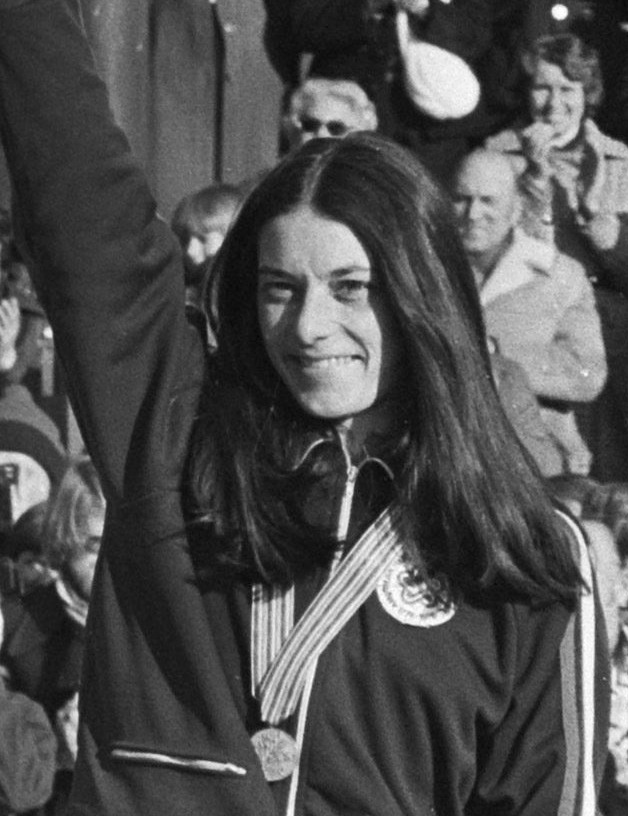
- Leah Poulos in 1977

Personal information
- Born: October 5, 1951 (age 74) Berwyn, Illinois, U.S.
- Height: 1.70 m (5 ft 7 in)
- Weight: 59 kg (130 lb)
- Spouse: Peter Mueller (divorced)

Sport
- Country: United States
- Sport: Speed skating
- Club: Northbrook Speedskating Club

Achievements and titles
- Personal bests: 500 m – 41.13 (1980); 1000 m – 1:23.07 (1980); 1500 m – 2:13.98 (1976); 3000 m – 5:11.43 (1976)
Medal record
Representing the United States
Olympic Games
| Silver medal – second place | 1976 Innsbruck | 1000 m |
| Silver medal – second place | 1980 Lake Placid | 500 m |
| Silver medal – second place | 1980 Lake Placid | 1000 m |
World Championships
| Gold medal – first place | 1974 Innsbruck | Sprint |
| Gold medal – first place | 1979 Inzell | Sprint |
| Silver medal – second place | 1976 Berlin | Sprint |
| Silver medal – second place | 1977 Alkmaar | Sprint |
| Silver medal – second place | 1980 West Allis | Sprint |

Leah Jean Poulos-Mueller (née Poulos; born October 5, 1951) is an American retired speed skater. She competed at the 1972, 1976 and 1980 Winter Olympics, and won two silver medals in 1980 and one in 1976. She garnered more than 65 Olympic, world, and international speed skating medals and titles during a career that spanned 12 competitive years and three Olympic teams. After retiring from competitions she had a long career in law as a civil litigator.

== Early life and education ==
In the early years, Poulos was a member of the Northbrook Speedskating Club in Northbrook, Illinois where many Olympians were trained. The club was founded in 1952 and resulted in Northbrook being dubbed as the Speedskating Capital of the World. More than twenty skaters from the club went on to the Olympic Games, and at least five skaters were recipients of various medals.

In the early days of her athletic career, her parents financed her training and travel expenses. She began training at the age of 7.

== Speedskating career ==
=== 1970 World Sprint Championships ===
Poulos specialized in sprint events and made her international debut at the World Sprint Speed Skating Championships (then called the ISU Sprint Championships) in 1970, where she won a silver medal in the 500 meter event.

=== 1972 Winter Olympic Games, Japan ===
Poulos placed 24th in the 1500 m and 17th in the 3000 m at the 1972 Winter Olympics.

=== 1974 World Allround Championships ===
Poulos competed in several World Allround Championships. Her first World Championship title came in 1974 when she became World Sprint Champion.

=== 1976 Winter Olympic Games, Innsbruck ===
Poulos participated in the 1976 Winter Olympics in Innsbruck and she entered in three distances. The first race was the 1500 m, in which she finished 6th. The next day, she skated the 500 m and finished 4th – only 0.04 seconds away from a bronze medal. The day after that, she won silver on the 1000 m, behind world record holder Tatyana Averina, and ahead of her compatriot Sheila Young, who took the bronze medal. Later that year, she won silver at the World Sprint Championships, behind Sheila Young.

=== 1976–1979 World Sprint Championships ===
In 1976 and 1977, Poulos-Mueller won silver again at the World Sprint Championships. In 1977, she won just behind Sylvia Burka. Poulos-Mueller retired from competition for one year when she married Peter Mueller. She returned to competition in 1979 and immediately became World Sprint Champion again. At this point, Poulos-Mueller was considered the best in the world in the women's 500 meter category. The following year, Poulos-Mueller finished second at the World Sprint Championships.

=== 1980 Winter Olympic Games, New York ===
Poulos participated in the 1980 Winter Olympics, where she competed in the 500 m and the 1000 m, winning silver in both.

=== 1980 World Sprint Championships ===
In 1980, Poulos-Mueller won silver again at the World Sprint Championships.

== Hall of Fame ==
Poulos-Mueller was inducted into the following Halls of Fame:

| Date | Hall of Fame |
|---|---|
| 1984 | American Hellenic Educational Progressive Association Athletic Hall of Fame (First Woman Inductee) |
| 1988 | National Speedskating Hall of Fame |
| 1995 | Northbrook Sports Hall of Fame in 1995. |
| 2009 | Chicagoland Sports Hall of Fame |

== Legal career ==
Poulos-Mueller is a JD graduate of Marquette University Law School. Presently, Poulos-Mueller is a practicing attorney and is the Senior Partner of Poulos-Mueller Attorneys out of Milwaukee where her practice was focused on constitutional rights. Poulos-Mueller currently concentrates a significant portion of her law practice in the areas of family and elder law.

=== White House Guest ===
Poulos-Mueller was a frequent guest of the United States President at the White House. Following are dates and events that Poulos-Mueller was an official guest at the White House:

She was a founding member of Title IX discussions resulting in increased participatory rights for women and girls in sports.

| Date | President | Event |
|---|---|---|
| May 7, 1976 | Gerald Ford | Meeting With the 1976 U.S. Winter Olympic Medal Winners |

== Personal life ==
After partially retiring from skating, in September 1977, Poulos married Peter Mueller, who had also won a gold medal on the 1000 m at the 1976 Winter Olympics. She then retired in earnest and then came out of retirement three years later to participate in the 1980 Winter Olympics. Subsequent to winning her string of medals, Poulos-Mueller retired from her Olympic career in order to support her husband's career and training and to prioritize her family values. Throughout her career as an Olympian, she also maintained a part-time career as a sales representative for Coca-Cola was the executive director or the United States International Speed Skating Association and mother of two.
