= Karin Kessow =

German speed skater

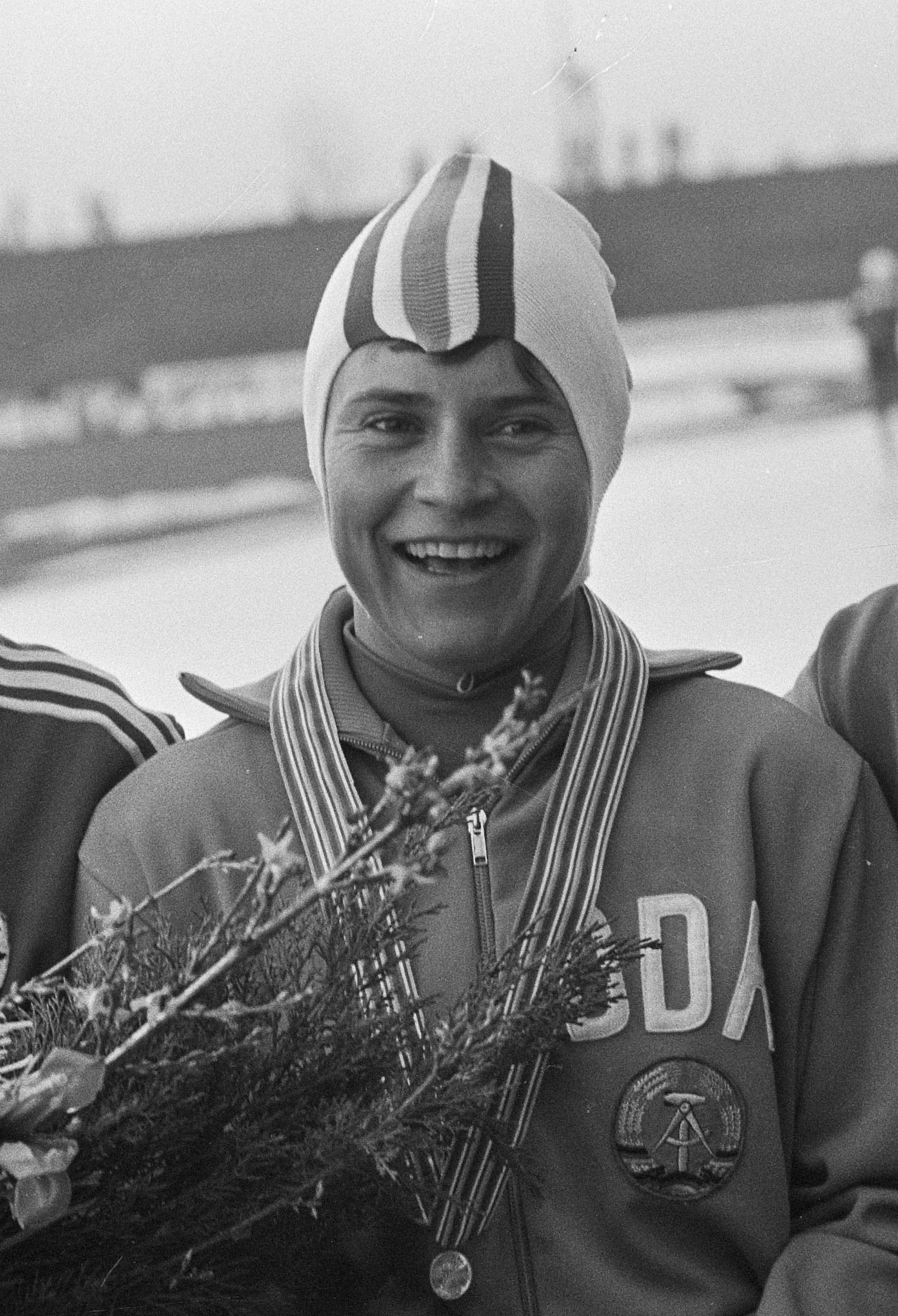
- Karin Kessow in 1975

Personal information
- Born: 8 January 1954 (age 72) Rostock, East Germany
- Height: 1.61 m (5 ft 3 1/2 in)
- Weight: 57 kg (126 lb)

Sport
- Country: East Germany
- Sport: Speed skating
- Club: SC Dynamo Berlin
Medal record
World Allround Championships
Gold medal – first place	1975 Assen	Allround

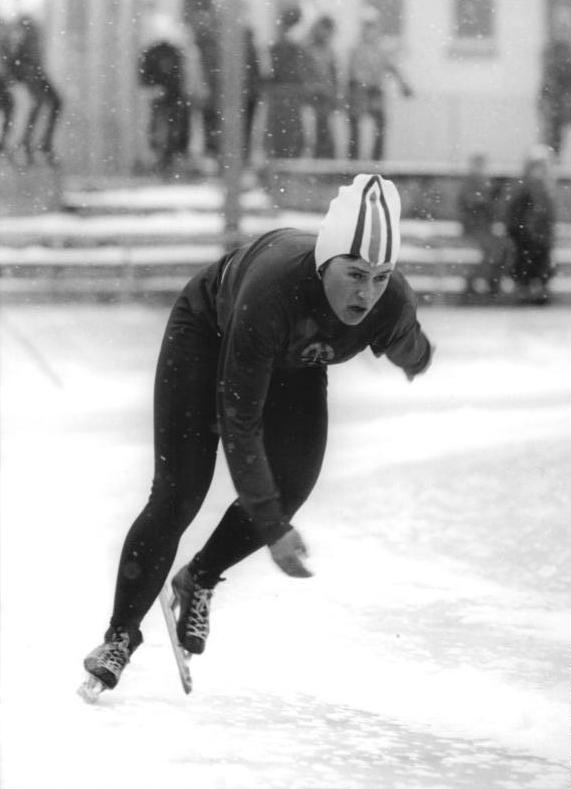
Karin Kessow, 1975

Karin Kessow (born 8 January 1954, married name Drbal) is a retired German speed skater who won the World All-Round Speed Skating Championships in 1975. Next year she competed at the 1976 Winter Olympics in the 1500 m and 3000 m and finished in fifth and fourth place, respectively.

After marrying Karl-Heinz Drbal she changed her last name to Drbal. She works as a speed skating coach in Berlin.

Personal bests:

- 500 m – 44.2 (1976)
- 1000 m – 1:27.2 (1976)
- 1500 m – 2:13.1 (1976)
- 3000 m – 4:39.1 (1976)
- 5000 m – 8:20.4 (1976)
