= Li Huchun =

Chinese speed skater

Personal information
- Full name: 李虎春
- Nationality: Chinese
- Born: 25 November 1956 (age 68)

Sport
- Sport: Speed skating

Li Huchun (born 25 November 1956) is a Chinese speed skater. He competed in two events at the 1980 Winter Olympics.
