= Cathy Priestner =

Canadian speed skater

Medal record

Women's speed skating

Representing Canada

Olympic Games
Silver medal – second place	1976 Innsbruck	500 m

World Championships
Bronze medal – third place	1975 Gothenburg	Sprint

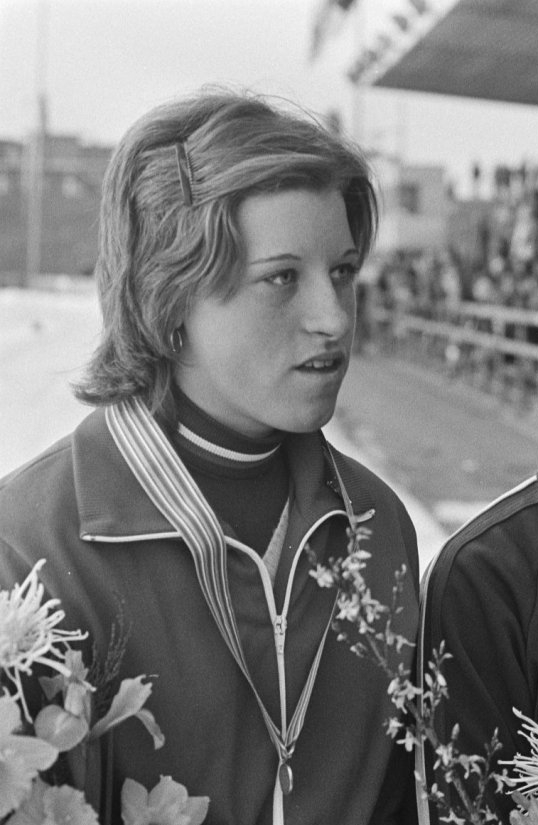
Priestner in 1975

Catherine Ann Priestner (born May 27, 1956 in Windsor, Ontario) is a Canadian who won a silver medal in speed skating at the 1976 Winter Olympics, where she was Canada's flag bearer in the closing ceremonies. She also competed in the 1972 Winter Olympics. She was inducted into the Canadian Olympic Hall of Fame in 1994. Priestner competed in her first competition at the age of 15.

She is married to Todd Allinger, a bio-mechanist and sports scientist, and resides in Vancouver, British Columbia.

As Cathy Priestner Allinger she has had a career in sport management, including the 2010 Vancouver Olympics, where she was executive vice president of sport, paralympic games and venue management, as well as roles with the 2006 Winter Olympics in Torino and the 2002 Winter Olympics in Salt Lake City and Canada's Own the Podium Olympic medal program. For the 2014 Sochi Winter Olympics in Russia she worked with the Russian Olympic Team to improve on its medal performance following the Canadian example from 2010.
