= Zhao Weichang =

Chinese speed skater

Personal information
- Full name: 赵伟昌
- Nationality: Chinese
- Born: 21 April 1950 Changchun, Jilin, China
- Died: 6 February 2025 (aged 74)

Sport
- Sport: Speed skating

Zhao Weichang (Chinese: 赵伟昌, 21 April 1950 – 6 February 2025) was a Chinese speed skater from Changchun, Jilin. He competed in three events at the 1980 Winter Olympics and became the head coach of Jilin Speed Skating Team after the 1980 games.

He was the first torch runner at the opening ceremony of the 2022 Winter Olympics.
