= Kim Chang-hae =

North Korean speed skater (born 1968)

Personal information
- Nationality: North Korean
- Born: 4 July 1968 (age 57)

Sport
- Sport: Speed skating

Kim Chang-hae (born 4 July 1968) is a North Korean speed skater. She competed in two events at the 1984 Winter Olympics.
