= Lee Kyung-ja =

South Korean speed skater

Personal information
- Nationality: South Korean
- Born: 8 April 1964 (age 60); Chungcheongbuk, South Korea

Sport
- Sport: Speed skating

Lee Kyung-ja (born 8 April 1964) is a South Korean speed skater. She competed in three events at the 1984 Winter Olympics.
