= Janina Korowicka =

Polish speed skater

Personal information
- Full name: Janina Urszula Korowicka
- Born: 14 April 1954 (age 72) Syców, Poland
- Height: 1.69 m (5 ft 7 in)
- Weight: 68 kg (150 lb)

Sport
- Country: Poland
- Sport: Speed skating

Janina Urszula Korowicka (born 14 April 1954) is a former Polish speed skater, who represented her native country at the 1976 Winter Olympics in Innsbruck, Austria. She is the mother of the German champion speed skater Anni Friesinger-Postma.
