= Choi Seung-youn =

South Korean speed skater

Personal information
- Nationality: South Korean
- Born: 25 July 1964 (age 60)

Sport
- Sport: Speed skating

Choi Seung-youn (born 25 July 1964) is a South Korean speed skater. She competed in three events at the 1984 Winter Olympics.
