= Liz Appleby =

Canadian speed skater

Personal information
- Born: 25 November 1958 (age 66) Winnipeg, Manitoba, Canada

Sport
- Sport: Speed skating

Elizabeth Appleby (born November 25, 1958) is a Canadian speed skater. She competed in three events at the 1976 Winter Olympics.

In 1986, Appleby was inducted into the Manitoba Sports Hall of Fame.
