= Dubravka Vukušić =

Croatian speed skater

Personal information
- Nationality: Croatian
- Born: 22 December 1965 (age 59); Zagreb, Yugoslavia

Sport
- Sport: Speed skating

Dubravka Vukušić (born 22 December 1965) is a Croatian speed skater. She competed in three events at the 1984 Winter Olympics, representing Yugoslavia.
