= Vera Bryndzei =

Ukrainian speed skater

Personal information
- Born: Vera Vladimirovna Bryndzei; 25 January 1952 (age 74) Ivano-Frankivsk, Soviet Union

Sport
- Country: Soviet Union
- Sport: Speed skating
Medal record
Representing Soviet Union
Women's speed skating
World Allround Championships
Gold medal – first place	1977 Keystone	Allround

Vera Vladimirovna Bryndzei (Russian: Вера Владимировна Брындзей, Ukrainian: Віра Володимирівна Бриндзей) (born 25 January 1952 in Ivano-Frankivsk, Ukrainian SSR) is a former speed skater who competed for the Soviet Union.

Skating for Dynamo Kiev, Vera Bryndzei won a silver medal at the Soviet Sprint Championships in 1975. She would eventually win two more national medals, both at the Soviet Allround Championships: silver in 1977 and bronze in 1978.

Bryndzei made her first international appearance in 1976 at the World Allround Championships in Gjøvik where she finished 16th. Her only international success came the next year when Bryndzei became the 1977 World Allround Champion in Keystone. She also participated in the World Sprint Championships two weeks later, finishing 23rd. In 1978, Bryndzei did not successfully defend her World Champion title, finishing in a disappointing 14th place. At the 1980 Winter Olympics of Lake Placid, she competed in the 1,500 m, resulting in an 18th place.

== Personal records ==
To put these personal records in perspective, the WR column lists the official world records on the dates that Bryndzei skated her personal records.

Event	Result	Date	Venue	WR
500 m	41.7	12 February 1977	Keystone	40.68
1,000 m	1:23.72	25 December 1976	Alma-Ata	1:23.46
1,500 m	2:10.93	26 March 1977	Alma-Ata	2:09.90
3,000 m	4:41.78	25 December 1979	Alma-Ata	4:31.00
5,000 m	8:15.41	7 April 1976	Alma-Ata	none

Note that the 5,000 m was suspended as a world record event at the 1955 ISU (International Skating Union) Congress and was reinstated at the 1982 ISU Congress.

Bryndzei has an Adelskalender score of 181.847 points.
