= Hiromi Ozawa =

Japanese speed skater (born 1961)

Personal information
- Nationality: Japanese
- Born: 18 September 1961 (age 63); Nagano, Nagano, Japan

Sport
- Sport: Speed skating

Hiromi Ozawa (小沢 洋美, Ozawa Hiromi; born 18 September 1961) is a Japanese speed skater. She competed in two events at the 1984 Winter Olympics.
