= Lilianna Morawiec =

Polish speed skater

Personal information
- Nationality: Polish
- Born: 11 February 1961 (age 64); Głuszyca, Poland

Sport
- Sport: Speed skating

Lilianna Morawiec (born 11 February 1961) is a Polish speed skater. She competed in three events at the 1984 Winter Olympics.
