= Pak Gum-hyon =

North Korean speed skater

Personal information
- Nationality: North Korean
- Born: 5 October 1964 (age 60); Kanggye, North Korea

Sport
- Sport: Speed skating

Pak Gum-hyon (born 5 October 1964) is a North Korean speed skater. She competed in three events at the 1984 Winter Olympics.
