= Paula-Irmeli Halonen =

Finnish speed skater

Personal information
- Nationality: Finnish
- Born: 22 August 1945 (age 79); Varkaus, Finland

Sport
- Sport: Speed skating

Paula-Irmeli Halonen (born 22 August 1945) is a Finnish speed skater. She competed in three events at the 1976 Winter Olympics.
