= Lee Yeon-ju (speed skater) =

South Korean speed skater

Personal information
- Nationality: South Korean
- Born: 19 January 1964 (age 61); Chuncheon, South Korea

Sport
- Sport: Speed skating

Lee Yeon-ju (born 19 January 1964) is a South Korean speed skater. She competed in three events at the 1984 Winter Olympics.
