= Shen Guoqin =

Chinese speed skater

Personal information
- Full name: 沈国芹
- Nationality: Chinese
- Born: 18 July 1961 (age 63); Jilin, China

Sport
- Sport: Speed skating

Shen Guoqin (Chinese: 沈国芹; pinyin: Shěn Guóqín, born 18 July 1961) is a Chinese speed skater. She competed at the 1980 Winter Olympics and the 1984 Winter Olympics.
