= Valentina Lalenkova =

Ukrainian speed skater

Personal information
- Nationality: Ukrainian
- Born: 5 May 1957 (age 67); Sverdlovsk, Russian SFSR, Soviet Union

Sport
- Sport: Speed skating

Valentina Lalenkova
Medal record

Representing Soviet Union

Women's speed skating

World Allround Championships
Bronze medal – third place	1983 Karl Marx Stadt	Allround

World Sprint Championships
Silver medal – second place	1984 Trondheim	Sprint

European Championships
Silver medal – second place	1984 Medeo	Allround

Valentina Lalenkova (born 5 May 1957) is a Ukrainian speed skater. She competed at the 1980 Winter Olympics and the 1984 Winter Olympics, representing the Soviet Union.
