= Cao Guifeng =

Chinese speed skater

Personal information
- Full name: 曹桂凤
- Nationality: Chinese
- Born: 5 November 1960 (age 64); Heilongjiang, China

Sport
- Sport: Speed skating

Cao Guifeng (born 5 November 1960) is a Chinese speed skater. She competed at the 1980 Winter Olympics and the 1984 Winter Olympics.
