= Marzia Peretti =

Italian speed skater

Personal information
- Nationality: Italian
- Born: 19 June 1965 (age 59); Turin, Italy

Sport
- Sport: Speed skating

Marzia Peretti (born 19 June 1965) is an Italian speed skater. She competed at the 1980 Winter Olympics and the 1984 Winter Olympics.
