= Kong Meiyu =

Chinese speed skater

Personal information
- Full name: 孔美玉
- Nationality: Chinese
- Born: 13 February 1960 (age 65); Jilin, China

Sport
- Sport: Speed skating

Kong Meiyu (born 13 February 1960) is a Chinese speed skater. She competed at the 1980 Winter Olympics and the 1984 Winter Olympics.
