= Kim Young-hee (speed skater) =

South Korean speed skater

Personal information
- Nationality: South Korean
- Born: 23 December 1955 (age 69); Seoul, South Korea

Sport
- Sport: Speed skating

Kim Young-hee (Korean: 김영희; Hanja: 金暎熙; RR: Gim Yeonghui, born 23 December 1955) is a South Korean speed skater. She competed in three events at the 1980 Winter Olympics.
