= Makiko Nagaya =

Japanese speed skater

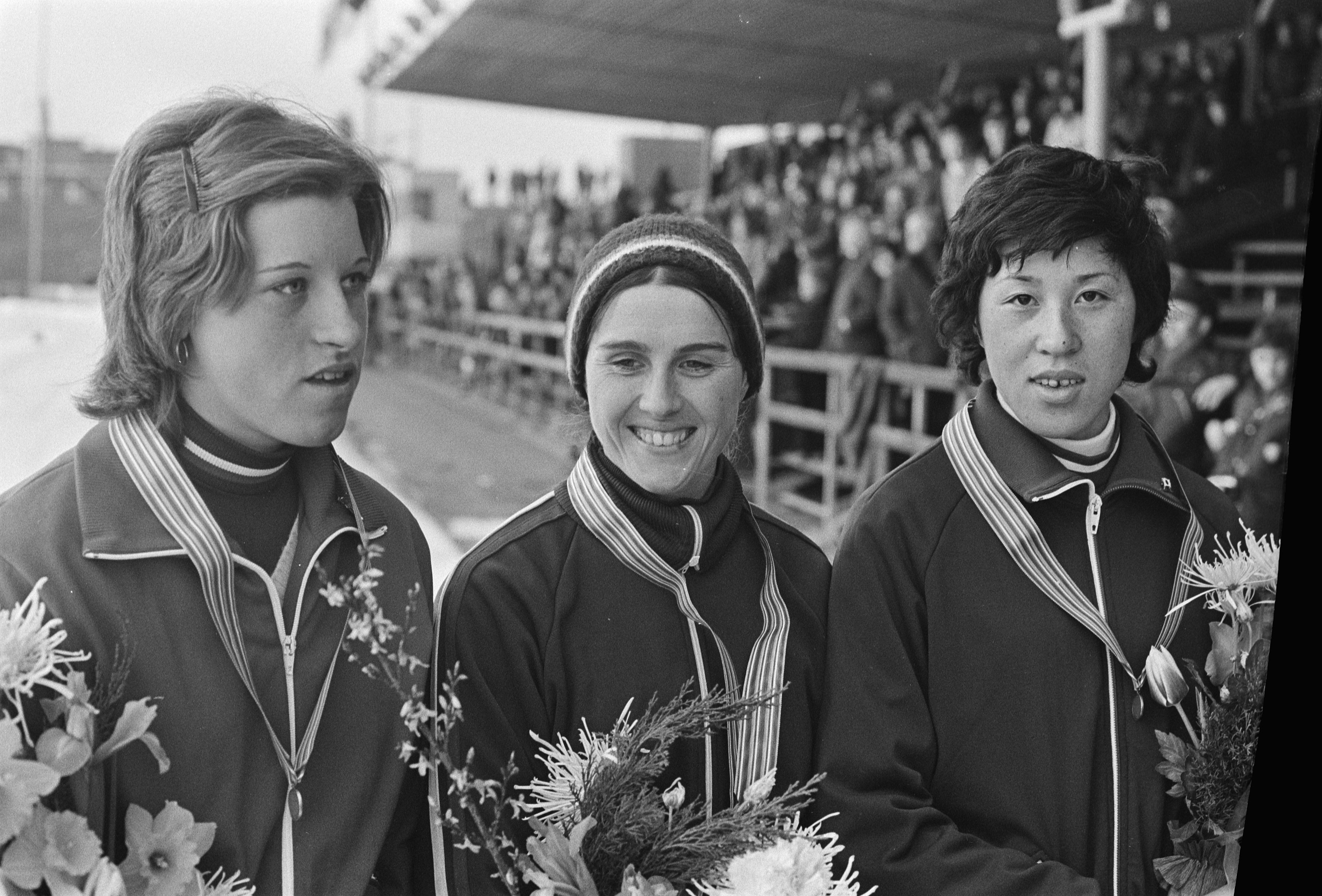
- Nagaya (right), bronze 1975 500 mtr.

Personal information
- Nationality: Japanese
- Born: 8 October 1955 (age 69); Rikubetsu, Hokkaido, Japan

Sport
- Sport: Speed skating

Makiko Nagaya (長屋 真紀子, Nagaya Makiko, born 8 October 1955) is a Japanese speed skater. She competed at the 1976 Winter Olympics and the 1980 Winter Olympics.
