= Ann-Sofie Järnström =

Swedish speed skater

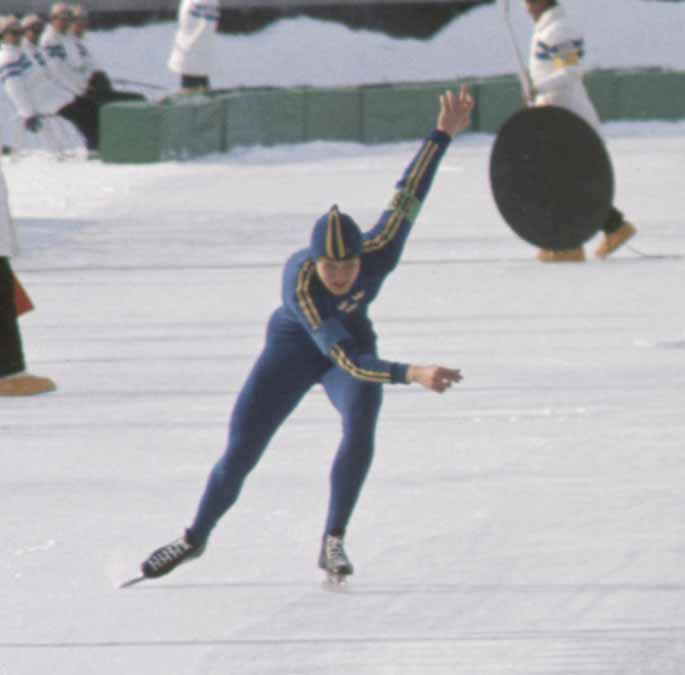
- Järnström at the 1972 Olympics

Personal information
- Born: 16 July 1949 (age 75); Kristinehamn, Sweden

Sport
- Sport: Speed skating
- Club: IFK Gothenburg (1972–1976); IK Wega (1980)

Ann-Sofie Järnström (born 16 July 1949) is a former ice speed skater from Sweden, who represented her native country at three consecutive Winter Olympics, starting in 1972 in Sapporo, Japan. She had her best results in 1980, when she finished fourth over 500 m and eighth over 1000 m.
