= Annette Carlén-Karlsson =

Swedish speed skater

Personal information
- Nationality: Swedish
- Born: 2 August 1956 (age 68); Kristinehamn, Sweden

Sport
- Sport: Speed skating

Annette Carlén-Karlsson (born 2 August 1956) is a Swedish speed skater. She competed at the 1980 Winter Olympics and the 1984 Winter Olympics.
