= Sigrid Smuda =

German speed skater

Personal information
- Full name: Sigrid Smuda-Fröschl
- Nationality: German
- Born: 4 February 1960 (age 65) Munich, West Germany

Sport
- Sport: Speed skating

Sigrid Smuda-Fröschl (born 4 February 1960) is a German speed skater. She competed at the 1980 Winter Olympics and the 1984 Winter Olympics.
