= Annie Borckink =

Dutch speed skater

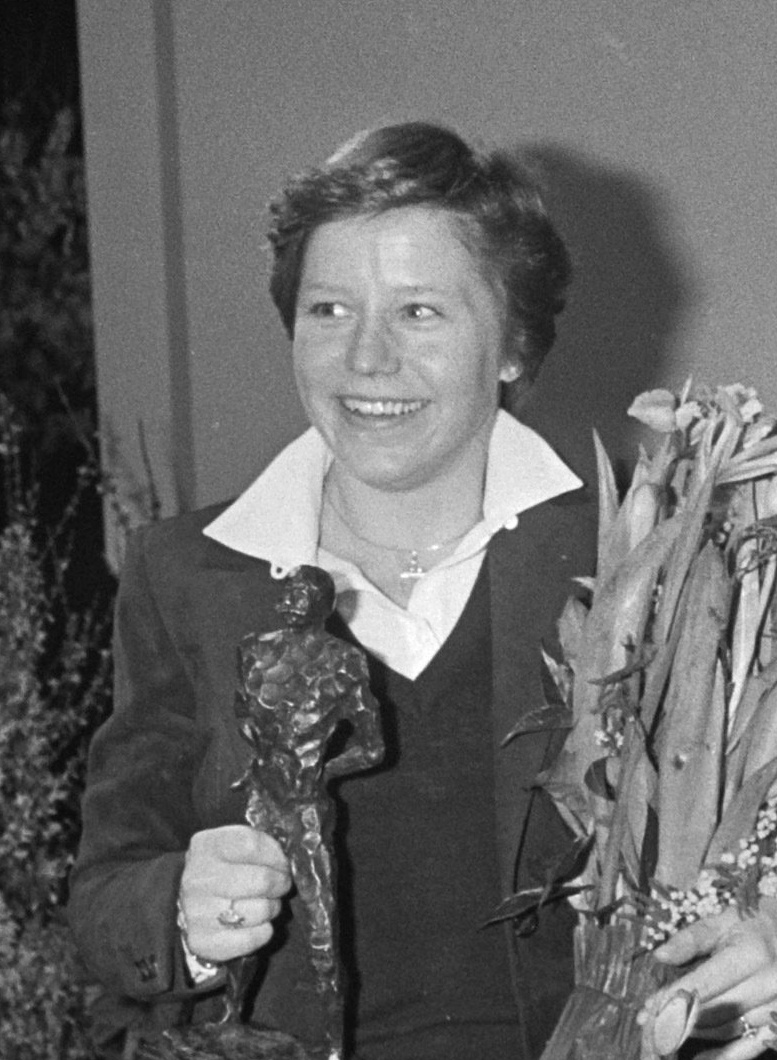
- Annie Borckink with the Sportswoman of the Year award in January 1981

Personal information
- Born: 17 October 1951 (age 74) Hupsel, Netherlands

Sport
- Sport: Speed skating
Medal record
Women's speed skating
Representing the Netherlands
Olympic Games
Gold medal – first place	1980 Lake Placid	1500 metres

Anna "Annie" Johanna Geertruida Maria Borckink (born 17 October 1951) is a former speed skater from the Netherlands, who represented her native country at the 1980 Winter Olympics in Lake Placid, United States. She won the gold medal in the women's 1500 metres event, with Dutch teammate Ria Visser winning the silver medal. For her performance, Borckink was named Dutch Sportswoman of the year. After retiring from skating she runs a sporting goods store in Dronten.

Personal bests:

- 500 m – 43.3 (1977)
- 1000 m – 1:25.60 (1980)
- 1500 m – 2:10.95 (1980)
- 3000 m – 4:41.75 (1981)

Awards
Preceded by Petra de Bruin	Dutch Sportswoman of the year 1980	Succeeded by Bettine Vriesekoop
