= Erwina Ryś-Ferens =

Polish speed skater (1955–2022)

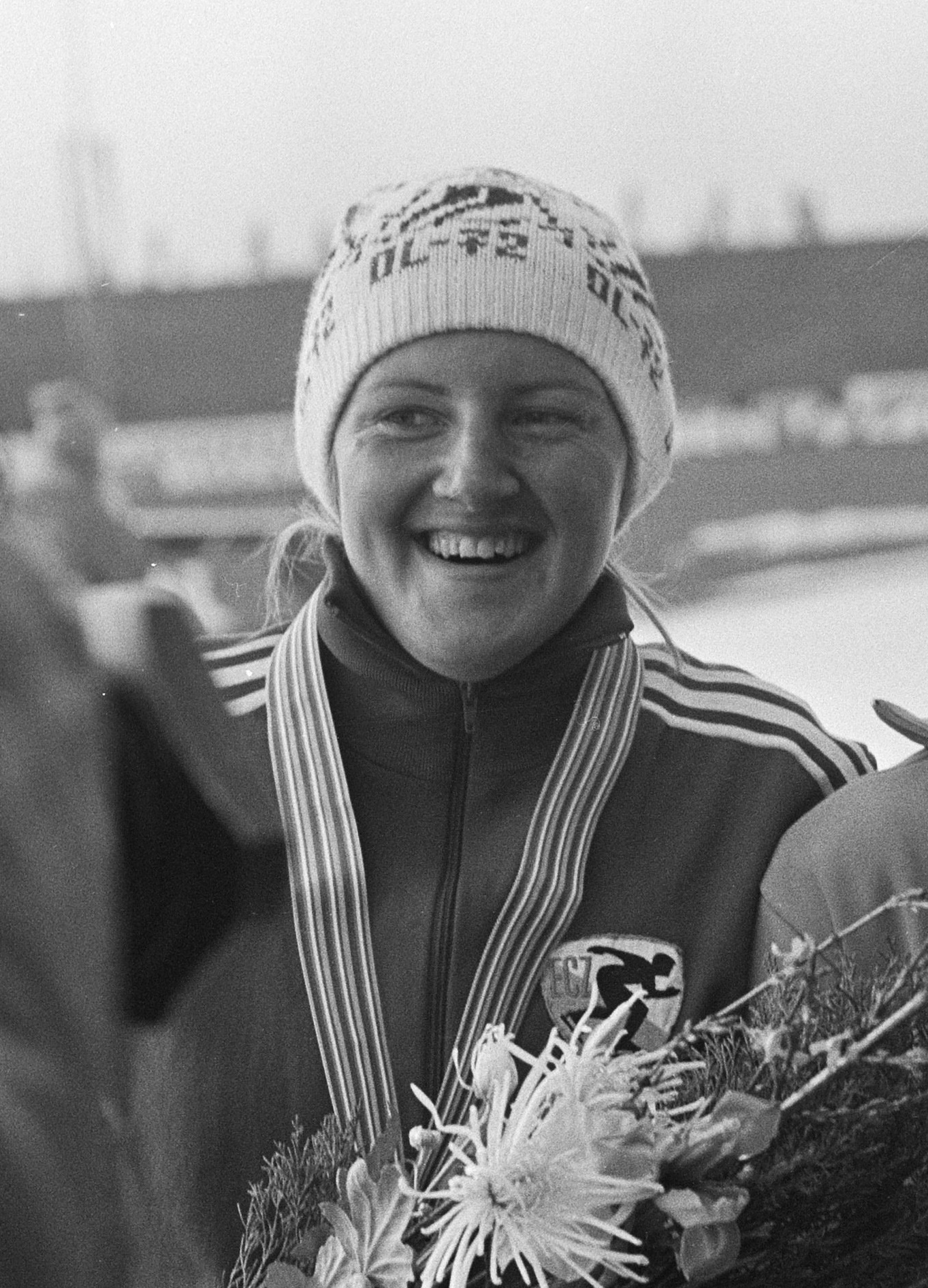
- Ryś-Ferens in 1975

Personal information
- Born: Erwina Lilia Ryś; 19 January 1955 Elbląg, Poland
- Died: 20 April 2022 (aged 67) Warsaw, Poland
- Height: 1.68 m (5 ft 6 in)
- Weight: 61 kg (134 lb)

Sport
- Country: Poland
- Sport: Speed skating
- Club: ZKS Olimpia Elbląg; Marymont Warszawa

Erwina Lilia Ryś-Ferens (née Ryś; 19 January 1955 – 20 April 2022) was a Polish speed skater.

== Career ==
She competed in four consecutive Winter Olympics from 1976 to 1988 in all distances from 500 m to 3000 m. She reached fifth place on three occasions: in 1980 (3000 m), in 1984 (1500 m) and in 1988 (3000 m).

She won a silver and a bronze medal at the World Junior Speed Skating Championships in 1974 and 1975, respectively. As a senior skater, she won bronze medals in the World Sprint Championships in 1978 and 1985.

Ryś-Ferens graduated from the local high school in her native Elbląg (1974) and then from the Karol Świerczewski Academy of Physical Education in Warsaw (1979). After retirement she worked as a speed skating coach.

Personal bests:

- 500 m – 40.86 (1985)
- 1000 m – 1:21.44 (1988)
- 1500 m – 2:04.68 (1988)
- 3000 m – 4:22.59 (1988)
- 5000 m – 7:46.60 (1988)

== Life in politics ==
Ryś-Ferens was an experienced politician. She unsuccessfully ran for the national and European Parliament in 2001, 2004, 2005, 2007, and 2009, representing various parties, including the National Party of Retirees and Pensioners, Democratic Left Alliance – Labor Union, Law and Justice, and Polish People's Party (PPP). She had success in the 2010 Polish local elections and 2011 representing PPP.

== Later life and death ==
She died after a long illness on 20 April 2022, at age 67. Two years before her death, her family revealed she suffered from bone cancer.
