= Norwegian Allround Championships =

Speed skating championships

The Norwegian Allround Championships are organized by the Norges Skøyteforbund (Norwegian Skating Association).

== Men's result ==
=== 1887-1893 Unofficial ===
Only one distance was skated, the 5000 meter. The winner was Norwegian Champion.

Year	Location	Gold	NC2	NC3
1887	Kristiania	Even Godager	Thor Larsen	Dagfin Døvle
1888	Kristiania	Even Godager	Adolf D Norseng	Fritz Lühr
1889	Kristiania	Even Godager	Julius E Olsen	Adolf D Norseng
1890	Kristiania	Oskar F Fredriksen	Henrik Lindahl	Ingvald Ottersen
1891	Kristiania	Henrik Lindahl	Olaf Nordtvedt	Nils Nilsen
1892	Kristiania	No Champions declared		
1893	Kristiania	No Champions declared		

- NC = Not classified

Source: skoyteforbundet.no

=== 1894-1911 ===
Three distances were skated, the 500, 1500 and 5000 meter.

Year	Location	Gold	NC2	NC3
1894	Hamar	Einar Halvorsen	Olaf Norseng	Filip N Petersen
1895	Trondhjem	Wilhelm Mauseth	Oskar F Fredriksen	Ole Østlund
1896	Kristiania	Wilhelm Mauseth	Martinius Lørdahl	Karl B. Olsen
1897	Trondhjem	Not declared		
1898	Trondhjem	Peder Østlund	Edvard Engelsaas	Martinius Llørdahl
1899	Kristiania	Alfred Næss	Rudolf Gundersen	Edvard Engelsaas
1900	Trondhjem	Edvard Engelsaas	Rudolf Gundersen	Asbjørn Bye
1901	Kristiania	Rudolf Gundersen	Asbjørn Bye	Carl Frantzen

- NC = Not classified

Year	Location	Gold	Silver	Bronze
1902	Hamar	Rudolf Gundersen	Johan Schwartz	Oluf Steen
1903	Drammen	Johan Schwartz	Rudolf Gundersen	Sigurd Mathisen
1904	Trondhjem	Oluf Steen	Martin Sæterhaug	Rudolf Røhne
1905	Kristiania	Rudolf Gundersen	Sigurd Mathisen	Oluf Steen
1906	Trondhjem	John Røst	Oluf Steen	Sigurd Mathsen
1907	Hamar	Oscar Mathisen	Martin Sæterhaug	Oluf Steen
1908	Kristiania	Martin Sæterhaug	Oscar Mathisen	Sigurd Mathisen
1909	Lillehammer	Oscar Mathisen	Sigurd Mathisen	Martin Sæterhaug
1910	Trondhjem	Oscar Mathisen	Martin Sæterhaug	Magnus Johansen
1911	Kristiania	Henning Olsen	Sigurd Mathisen	Stener Johannessen

Source: skoyteforbundet.no

=== 1912-Current ===
Four distances were skated, the 500, 1500, 5000 and 10000 meter.

Year	Location	Gold	Silver	Bronze
1912	Hamar	Oscar Mathisen	Henning Olsen	Martin Sæterhaug
1913	Horten	Oscar Mathisen	Kristian Strøm	Martin Sæterhaug
1914	Trondhjem	Martin Sæterhaug	Stener Johannessen	Melvin Johansen
1915	Kristiania	Oscar Mathisen	Sverre Aune	Kristian Strøm
1916	Drammen	Kristian Strøm	Sverre Aune	Martin Sæterhaug
1917	Kristiania	Kristian Strøm	Ole Mamen	Martin Sæterhaug
1918	Horten	Kristian Strøm	Fridtjof Paulsen	Gustav Gulbrandsen
1919	Hamar	Kristian Strøm	Martin Sæterhaug	Ole Mamen
1920	Trondhjem	Kristian Strøm	Fridtjof Paulsen	Ole Olsen
1921	Moss	Ole Olsen	Roald Larsen	Ole Mamen
1922	Drammen	Roald Larsen	Ole Olsen	Theodor Pedersen
1924	Kongsberg	Roald Larsen	Sigurd Moen	Sverre Aune
1925	Moss	Sigurd Moen	Roald Larsen	Ragnvald Olsen
1926	Tønsberg	Ivar Ballangrud	Sigurd Moen	Roald Larsen
1927	Oslo	Bernt Evensen	Roald Larsen	Ragnvald Olsen
1928	Sandefjord	Bernt Evensen	Roald Larsen	Armand Carlsen
1929	Lillehammer	Ivar Ballangrud	Michael Staksrud	Bernt Evensen
1930	Hamar	Ivar Ballangrud	Michael Staksrud	Per Holtung
1931	Horten	Thorstein Stenbek	Kolbjørn Andersen	Carsten Christensen
1932	Oslo	Michael Staksrud	Ivar Ballangrud	Hans Engnestangen
1933	Notodden	Bernt Evensen	Mons Mjelde	Michael Staksrud
1934	Drammen	Michael Staksrud	Charles Mathiesen	Hans Engnestangen

Year	Location	Gold	Points	Silver	Points	Bronze	Points
1935	Brandbu	Bernt Evensen	199,472	Ivar Ballangrud	201,217	Charles Mathiesen	203,472
1936	Oslo	Ivar Ballangrud	197,602	Charles Mathiesen	197,717	Michael Staksrud	198,583
1937	Gjøvik	Hans Engnestangen	198,983	Charles Mathiesen	200,675	Harry Haraldsen	202,477
1938	Skien	Hans Engnestangen	204,885	Harry Haraldsen	205,750	Charles Mathiesen	207,232
1939	Oslo	Ivar Ballangrud	196,700	Charles Mathiesen	196,878	Edward Wangberg	197,113
1940	Hamar	Harry Haraldsen	199,633	Charles Mathiesen	200,430	Edward Wangberg	200,540
1941	Not held due to WWII						
1942	Not held due to WWII						
1943	Not held due to WWII						
1944	Not held due to WWII						
1945	Not held due to WWII						
1946	Oslo	Aage Johansen	198,668	Charles Mathiesen	199,240	Odd Lundberg	201,152
1947	Trondheim	Henry Wahl	210,437	Odd Lundberg	209,877	Aage Johansen	213,860
1948	Drammen	Odd Lundberg	208,675	Reidar Liaklev	210,343	Charles Mathiesen	211,963
1949	Tønsberg	Reidar Liaklev	200,320	Sverre Farstad	201,152	Hjalmar Andersen	201,633
1950	Trondheim	Hjalmar Andersen	193,940	Henry Wahl	197,612	Reidar Liaklev	197,667
1951	Lillehammer	Hjalmar Andersen	195,130	Sverre Haugli	197,145	Roald Aas	197,283
1952	Gjøvik	Hjalmar Andersen	191,313	Roald Aas	195,615	Yngvar Karlsen	196,545
1953	Skien	Sverre Haugli	195,798	Roald Aas	196,520	Finn Hodt	198,043
1954	Oslo	Hjalmar Andersen	199,815	Sverre Haugli	200,737	Finn Hodt	200,930
1955	Bergen	Knut Johannesen	207,442	Roald Aas	208,442	Per Ødegaard	211,657
1956	Hamar	Roald Aas	192,273	Knut Johannesen	193,192	Hjalmar Andersen	196,590
1957	Larvik	Knut Johannesen	195,995	Roald Aas	196,865	Finn Hodt	199,260
1958	Notodden	Knut Johannesen	194,202	Roald Aas	195,593	Knut Tangen	199,222
1959	Trondheim	Knut Johannesen	193,207	Roald Aas	194,993	Torstein Seiersten	196,323
1960	Hønefoss	Knut Johannesen	191,220	Roald Aas	193,635	Torstein Seiersten	195,537
1961	Sandefjord	Knut Johannesen	202,600	Nils Aaness	204,097	Fred Anton Maier	205,587
1962	Harstad	Knut Johannesen	191,220	Nils Aaness	191,140	Svein-Erik Stiansen	192,548
1963	Hamar	Knut Johannesen	183,035	Nils Aaness	185,088	Fred Anton Maier	185,185
1964	Tønsberg	Per Ivar Moe	183,830	Knut Johannesen	185,055	Nils Aaness	186,837
1965	Arendal	Fred Anton Maier	184,528	Per Ivar Moe	185,028	Magne Thomassen	185,942
1966	Drammen	Svein-Erik Stiansen	181,742	Fred Anton Maier	182,857	Per Ivar Moe	183,317
1967	Trondheim	Svein-Erik Stiansen	183,817	Fred Anton Maier	185,580	Magne Thomassen	185,650
1968	Horten	Magne Thomassen	179,462	Fred Anton Maier	179,518	Per Willy Guttormsen	181,038
1969	Lillehammer	Dag Fornæss	178,098	Magne Thomassen	179,173	Svein-Erik Stiansen	179,377
1970	Skien	Dag Fornæss	177,868	Roar Grønvold	178,247	Magne Thomassen	179,363
1971	Moss	Dag Fornæss	178,147	Roar Grønvold	179,422	Sten Stensen	180,182
1972	Tønsberg	Roar Grønvold	177,929	Dag Fornæss	178,540	Sten Stensen	179,122
1973	Notodden	Sten Stensen	179,506	Per Willy Guttormsen	182,453	Erik Vea	183,039
1974	Alta	Sten Stensen	177,464	Amund Sjøbrend	178,547	Asle Terje Johansen	178,610
1975	Brandbu	Amund Sjøbrend	179,886	Jan Egil Storholt	180,441	Terje Andersen	181,042
1976	Trondheim	Kay Stenshjemmet	177,698	Sten Stensen	177,977	Amund Sjøbrend	179,234
1977	Lillehammer	Kay Stenshjemmet	168,677	Sten Stensen	169,653	Jan Egil Storholt	170,423
1978	Larvik	Kay Stenshjemmet	173,417	Sten Stensen	173,519	Jan Egil Storholt	174,501
1979	Hamar	Jan Egil Storholt	169,556	Kay Stenshjemmet	171,896	Amund Sjøbrend	172,424
1980	Drammen	Tom Erik Oxholm	170,713	Øyvind Tveter	173,658	Amund Sjøbrend	174,407
1981	Kongsvinger	Kay Stenshjemmet	174,068	Amund Sjøbrend	175,283	Øyvind Tveter	175,766
1982	Oppdal	Rolf Falk-Larssen	168,132	Tom Erik Oxholm	169,119	Øyvind Tveter	169,624
1983	Tynset	Rolf Falk-Larssen	166,165	Bjørn Nyland	167,827	Tom Erik Oxholm	168,577
1984	Kongsberg	Rolf Falk-Larssen	168,071	Bjørn Nyland	168,843	Tom Erik Oxholm	171,750
1985	Trondheim	Rolf Falk-Larssen	171,035	Geir Karlstad	172,873	Øyvind Tveter	174,751
1986	Jevnaker	Tom Erik Oxholm	171,374	Geir Karlstad	172,084	Rolf Falk-Larssen	172,201
1987	Hamar	Bjørn Nyland	167,943	Tom Erik Oxholm	170,252	Frode Syvertsen	170,321
1988	Oslo	Rolf Falk-Larssen	167,468	Geir Karlstad	168,961	Frode Syvertsen	169,488
1989	Hundorp	Geir Karlstad	170,950	Johann Olav Koss	172,104	Frode Syvertsen	175,123
1990	Verdal	Geir Karlstad	170,124	Johann Olav Koss	171,303	Ådne Søndrål	173,239
1991	Hol/Gol	Johann Olav Koss	167,092	Geir Karlstad	170,678	Ådne Søndrål	171,375
1992	Savalen	Johann Olav Koss	163,621	Geir Karlstad	166,174	Ådne Søndrål	166,615
1993	Trondheim	Johann Olav Koss	168,020	Steinar Johansen	173,232	Ådne Søndrål	173,482
1994	Larvik	Johann Olav Koss	168,844	Kjell Storelid	171,022	Steinar Johansen	171,565
1995	Hønefoss	Ådne Søndrål	169,656	Steinar Johansen	170,909	Kjell Storelid	171,881
1996	Tromsø	Petter Andersen	175,340	Ronny Yndestad	177,412	Ørjan Tvenge	177,630
1997	Bergen	Kjell Storelid	168,430	Brigt Rykkje	168,908	Steinar Johansen	170,706
1998	Geithus	Lasse Sætre	166.080	Remi Hereide	166,332	Brigt Rykkje	166,467
1999	Alta	Ørjan Tvenge	167,784	Lasse Sætre	168,164	Stian Bjørge	168,204
2000	Hamar	Eskil Ervik	155,663	Petter Andersen	156,628	Lasse Sætre	157,954
2001	Geithus	Eskil Ervik	164,050	Stian Bjørge	164,935	Kjell Storelid	167,233
2002	Skien	Eskil Ervik	164,212	Stian Bjørge	166,916	Øystein Grødum	167,960
2003	Bergen	Eskil Ervik	164,101	Lasse Sætre	165,979	Øystein Grødum	169,201
2004	Oslo	Eskil Ervik	165,573	Odd B. Borgersen	166,795	Øystein Grødum	168,532
2005	Drammen	Henrik Christiansen	166,275	Sverre Haugli	167,052	Arild Nebb Ervik	167,652
2006	Arendal	Eskil Ervik	155,844	Håvard Bøkko	157,458	Odd B. Borgersen	158,458
2007	Geithus	Eskil Ervik	157,648	Henrik Christiansen	159,162	Sverre Haugli	160,054
2008	Bjugn	Håvard Bøkko	156,300	Sverre Haugli	160,055	Henrik Christiansen	162,185
2009	Gol	Håvard Bøkko	157,542	Sverre Haugli	161,404	Tore Solli	162,989
2010	Bergen	Håvard Bøkko	158,408	Henrik Christiansen	161,931	Sverre Haugli	162,695
2011	Oslo	Håvard Bøkko	159,361	Sverre Lunde Pedersen	160,942	Henrik Christiansen	161,471
2012	Tønsberg	Håvard Bøkko	(156,902)	Kristian Reistad Fredriksen	(160,271)	Simen Spieler Nilsen	(161,545)
2013	Stavanger	Håvard Bøkko	150,084	Sverre Lunde Pedersen	150,865	Simen Spieler Nilsen	154,213
2014	Asker	Håvard Bøkko	161,154	Fredrik van der Horst	162,284	Tormod Bjørnetun Haugen	164,389
2015	Arendal	Håvard Bøkko	159,537	Fredrik van der Horst	161,890	Simen Spieler Nilsen	162,154
2016	Stavanger	Sverre Lunde Pedersen	150,150	Håvard Bøkko	152,826	Sindre Henriksen	155,394
2017	Trondheim	Sverre Lunde Pedersen	159,780	Sindre Henriksen	162,844	Fredrik van der Horst	164,674
2018	Jevnaker	Magnus Bakken Haugli	162,829	Kristian Ulekleiv	163,678	Runar Njåtun Krøyer	164,359
2019	Arendal	Sverre Lunde Pedersen	154,134	Håvard Bøkko	155,969	Kristian Ulekleiv	157,748
2020	Asker	Not held because of COVID-19 pandemic in Norway.					
2021	Hamar	Sverre Lunde Pedersen	151,160	Hallgeir Engebråten	151,755	Peder Kongshaug	152,254
2022							

Source: skoyteforbundet.no

== Women's result ==
=== 1932 Unofficial ===
Three distances were skated, the 500, 1000 and 1500 meter.

Year	Location	Gold	Silver	Bronze
1932	Oslo	Synnøve Lie	Erna Andersen	Borghild Aasen

Source: skoyteforbundet.no

=== 1933-1936 ===
Three distances were skated, the 500, 1000 and 1500 meter.

Year	Location	Gold	Silver	Bronze
1933	Oslo	Synnøve Lie	Undis Blikken	Bera Brinck Løvstad
1934	Horten	Undis Blikken	Laila Schou Nilsen	Synnøve Lie

Year	Location	Gold	Points	Silver	Points	Bronze	Points
1935	Oslo	Laila Schou Nilsen	163,883	Undis Blikken	165,333	Synnøve Lie	170,750
1936	Hønefoss	Undis Blikken	161,000	Synnøve Lie	164,833	Jane Bjerke	170,283

Source: skoyteforbundet.no

=== 1937-1982 ===
Four distances were skated, the 500, 1000, 1500 and 3000 meter

Year	Location	Gold	Points	Silver	Points	Bronze	Points
1937	Oslo	Laila Schou Nilsen	210,717	Synnøve Lie	218,500	Ella Berntsen	238,750
1938	Tønsberg	Undis Blikken	245,666	Laila Schou Nilsen	239,350	Synnøve Lie	239,383
1939	Kongsberg	Laila Schou Nilsen	222,134	Synnøve Lie	224,250	Edith Kleven	235,700
1940	Lavik	Laila Schou Nilsen	217,150	Undis Blikken	228,500	Synnøve Lie	229,317
1941	Not held due to WWII						
1942	Not held due to WWII						
1943	Not held due to WWII						
1944	Not held due to WWII						
1945	Not held due to WWII						
1946	Larvik	Randi Thorvaldsen	234,634	Aslaug Pedersen	235,016	Maggi Kvestad	241,866
1947	Rjukan	Randi Thorvaldsen	226,350	Else Marie Christiansen	236,317	Elsa Jondalen	237,216
1948	Larvik	Randi Thorvaldsen	224,550	Else Marie Christiansen	235,484	Elsa Jondalen	237,450
1949	Tønsberg	Randi Thorvaldsen	212,734	Maggi Kvestad	232,233	Erna Aas	233,017
1950	Gjøvik	Randi Thorvaldsen	207,883	Ragnhild Mikkelsen	230,716	Aase Halstvedt	232,067
1951	Hønefoss	Randi Thorvaldsen	218,833	Astri Mæhre Johannessen	232,334	Ragnhild Mikkelsen	236,633
1952	Trondheim	Randi Thorvaldsen	204,283	Astri Mæhre Johannessen	218,717	Kari Danielsen	229,417
1953	Horten	Randi Thorvaldsen	211,850	Astri Mæhre Johannessen	219,350	Sonja Ackermann-Olsen	223,367
1954	Larvik	Randi Thorvaldsen	216,950	Sonja Ackermann-Olsen	223,450	Astri Mæhre Johannessen	230,017
1955	Skien	Astri Mæhre Johannessen	232,383	Sonja Ackermann-Olsen	234,183	Bjørg Hæhre	245,367
1956	Not held due to not enough competitors.						
1957	Not held due to not enough competitors.						
1958	Sandefjord	Sonja Ackermann-Olsen	233,016	Jorun Tangen	241,767	Else Methi	247,616
1959	Lillehammer	Sonja Ackermann-Olsen	221,600	Astri Mæhre Johannessen	226,217	Karin Horn Evensen	236,250
1960	Hakadal	Randi Elisabeth Nilsen	227,216	Elsie Heibø	236,933	-	-
1961	Rakkestad	Randi Elisabeth Nilsen	227,200	Aud Groven	234,967	Bjørg Hovden	238,767
1962	Hamar	Tove Jacobsen	223,484	Aud Groven	223,500	Randi Elisabeth Nilsen	228,484
1963	Oslo	Sigrid Sundby	209,433	Randi Elisabeth Nilsen	216,266	Mette Rosenvinge	219,467
1964	Larvik	Sigrid Sundby	216,383	Gerd Inger De Groot	219,717	Aud Groven	222,250
1965	Horten	Sigrid Sundby	210,167	Kari Kåring	213,067	Gerd Inger De Groot	216,284
1966	Lillehammer	Sigrid Sundby	207,550	Lisbeth Berg	208,284	Kari Kåring	209,550
1967	Brandbu	Sigrid Sundby	206,250	Lisbeth Berg	207,900	Kari Kåring	211,900
1968	Bergen/Voss	Sigrid Sundby	214,500	Lisbeth Berg	216,184	Kari Kåring	216,333
1969	Oslo	Sigrid Sundby	198,266	Lisbeth Berg	200,267	Kirsti Biermann	200,916
1970	Hønefoss	Sigrid Sundby	193,083	Lisbeth Berg	193,700	Kirsti Biermann	197,983
1971	Holmestrand	Lisbeth Berg	196,350	Kirsti Biermann	197,550	Sigrid Sundby	198,483
1972	Brandbu	Lisbeth Berg	190,833	Sigrid Sundby	191,734	Inger Karset	198,600
1973	Horten	Sigrid Sundby	198,616	Lisbeth Berg	202,816	Tove Berntsen	208,000
1974	Gjøvik	Lisbeth Berg	192,533	Sigrid Sundby	193,533	Tove Berntsen	198,967
1975	Oslo	Lisbeth Korsmo	192,984	Sigrid Sundby	195,900	Berit Haugård	204,066
1976	Dokka	Lisbeth Korsmo	190,016	Berit Haugård	205,000	Elisabeth Schjenken	208,500
1977	Eidsvoll	Lisbeth Korsmo	195,395	Elisabeth Schjenken	203,885	Berit Haugård	205,360
1978	Skedsmo	Lisbeth Korsmo	187,283	Elisabeth Schjenken	193,532	Anne Gjersem	196,433
1979	Stange	Bjørg Eva Jensen	183,542	Ann-Mari Tollefsen	190,526	Grethe Viksaas	193,852
1980	Tynset	Bjørg Eva Jensen	181,442	Turid Lillehagen	191,196	Anne Bjørnsmoen	201,121
1981	Hol	Bjørg Eva Jensen	190,816	Mona Iversen	196,382	Ann-Mari Amundsen	198,116
1982	Kolbotn	Bjørg Eva Jensen	177,062	Turid Lillehagen	188,243	Mona Iversen	191,039

Source: skoyteforbundet.no

=== 1983-Current ===
Four distances were skated, the 500, 1500, 3000 and 5000 meter

Year	Location	Gold	Points	Silver	Points	Bronze	Points
1983	Hamar	Bjørg Eva Jensen	182,613	Turid Lillehagen	198,582	Rigmor Lundby	200,222
1984	Stavanger	Tone Regine Hølstad	209,939	Anne Elisabeth Hølstad	213,672	Bente Munkerud	213,924
1985	Kongsvinger	Edel Therese Høiseth	195,142	Marie Tollefsen	202,037	Merete Pettersen	203,967
1986	Tromsø	Bjørg Eva Jensen	186,165	Edel Therese Høiseth	190,778	Marie Tollefsen	195,600
1987	Hamar	Bjørg Eva Jensen	191,728	Minna Nystedt	194,517	Else Ragni Yttredal	195,515
1988	Oslo	Bjørg Eva Jensen	191,929	Minna Nystedt	191,975	Anette Tønsberg	195,623
1989	Hundorp	Heidi Skjeggestad	191,271	Anette Tønsberg	191,426	Minna Nystedt	191,952
1990	Verdal	Heidi Skjeggestad	187,322	Minna Nystedt	188,980	Else Ragni Yttredal	189,841
1991	Hol	Else Ragni Yttredal	187,890	Anette Tønsberg	191,488	Minna Nystedt	192,530
1992	Savalen	Else Ragni Yttredal	183,393	Minna Nystedt	IL 184,992	Anette Tønsberg	186,757
1993	Trondheim	Else Ragni Yttredal	190,540	Anette Tønsberg	191,693	Minna Nystedt	196,353
1994	Larvik	Anette Tønsberg	197,466	Else Ragni Yttredal	203,081	Lillan Westli	208,453
1995	Hønefoss	Anette Tønsberg	188,190	Nina Tørset	198,035	Heidi Støkker	198,372
1996	Tromsø	Anette Tønsberg	193,248	Nina Tørset	200,580	Anne Therese Tveter	202,901
1997	Bergen	Anette Tønsberg	183,735	Anne Therese Tveter	190,350	Ellen Kathrine Lie	192,806
1998	Geithus	Anette Tønsberg	179,767	Lise Marie Braathen	186,125	Ellen Kathrine Lie	189,478
1999	Alta	Anne Therese Tveter	189,421	Nina Tørset	190,299	Ragnhild Andresen	198,254
2000	Hamar	Hedvig Bjelkevik	173,901	Edel Therese Høiseth	175,011	Ellen Kathrine Lie	175,896
2001	Geithus	Annette Bjelkevik	186,179	Ellen Kathrine Lie	186,545	Anne Therese Tveter	187,027
2002	Skien	Anette Tønsberg	184,677	Anne Therese Tveter	189,698	Silje Bjelkevik	196,977
2003	Bergen	Hedvig Bjelkevik	184,779	Annette Bjelkevik	186,624	Maren Haugli	189,875
2004	Oslo	Hedvig Bjelkevik	183,742	Annette Bjelkevik	183,968	Maren Haugli	186,778
2005	Drammen	Mari Hemmer	187,575	Anne Grethe Viik	206,242	Line Foss	215,930
2006	Arendal	Maren Haugli	172,443	Hedvig Bjelkevik	176,453	Annette Bjelkevik	176,764
2007	Geithus	Mari Hemmer	177,083	Hedvig Bjelkevik	178,082	Annette Bjelkevik	178,958
2008	Bjugn	Mari Hemmer	176,875	Maren Haugli	177,339	Ida Njåtun	184,579
2009	Gol	Maren Haugli	178,430	Mari Hemmer	179,005	Hege Bøkko	181,542
2010	Bergen	Mari Hemmer	175,733	Maren Haugli	176,780	Hanne Haugland	187,284
2011	Oslo	Ida Njåtun	175,487	Mari Hemmer	176,915	Hege Bøkko	179,496
2012	Tønsberg	Hege Bøkko	(179,254)	Mari Hemmer	(181,659)	Ellen Bjertnes	(186,048)
2013	Stavanger	Ida Njåtun	166,797	Mari Hemmer	169,838	Sofie Karoline Haugen	173,595
2014	Asker	Ida Njåtun	178,919	Mari Hemmer	179,194	Camilla Farestveit	181,488
2015	Arendal	Ida Njåtun	174,334	Frida van Megen	178,201	Hege Bøkko	179,014
2016	Stavanger	Ida Njåtun	165,713	Sofie Karoline Haugen	171,081	Camilla Lund	172,474
2017	Trondheim	Sofie Karoline Haugen	181,572	Camilla Lund	181,906	Inga Anne Vasaasen	184,369
2018	Jevnaker	Sofie Karoline Haugen	176,624	Camilla Lund	179,469	Ragne Wiklund	179,558
2019	Arendal	Ida Njåtun	175,376	Ragne Wiklund	178,033	Camilla Lund	178,365
2020	Asker	Not held because of COVID-19 pandemic in Norway.					
2021	Hamar	Ragne Wiklund	164,201	Sofie Karoline Haugen	168,032	Marte Bjerkreim Furnée	174,520
2022							

Source: skoyteforbundet.no
