= Frogner stadion =

Sports venue in Oslo, Norway

Frogner
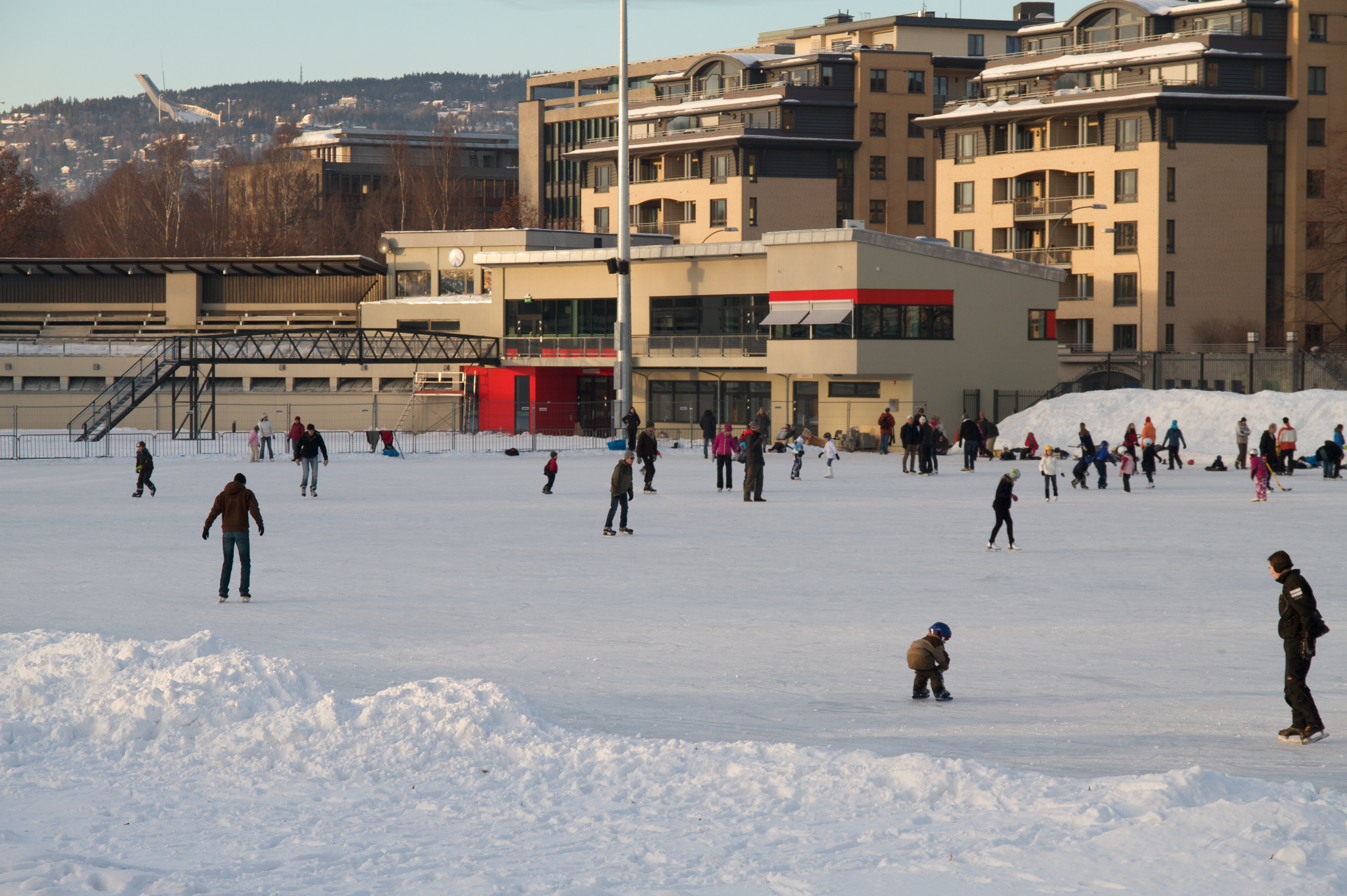
- Frogner stadion, February 2010.
- Interactive map of Frogner
- Full name: Frogner stadion
- Location: Middelthunsgate 28; Oslo, Norway
- Owner: City of Oslo
- Capacity: 4,200
- Surface: Skating / artificial turf

Construction
- Opened: 10 January 1914
- Renovated: 2010

Tenants
- Frigg Oslo FK; Frigg Bandy; Oslo Vikings; Lyn Fotball; Oslo SK

Frogner stadion is a sports stadium in Oslo, Norway, which has artificial ice in the winter for speed skating and bandy. The artificial grass is used in the summer for soccer and American football. It is located close to the Frogner Park, between the park and Majorstuen. One match, Norway-Belarus, was played here at the 2013 Bandy World Championship.

== History ==
It opened in 1901, and was built by the speed skating club Kristiania Skøiteklub. In 1914, the stadium was moved to its current position, due to the 1914 Jubilee Exhibition. At the inaugural race in 1914, two speed skating world records were set by Oscar Mathisen, in 500 m and 1,500 m. In 1928, Oslo Municipality took over responsibility for the stadium.

Frogner stadion was one of the most important ice skating venues in Norway until 1940. A long series of championships were held at Frogner stadion, both in figure skating and in speed skating. A total of 23 speed skating world records have been set at the stadium (including some not officially listed). Seventeen of the records from Frogner are listed among the official ISU world records in speed skating.

Outside the stadium are statues of Oscar Mathisen and Sonja Henie.

Frogner stadion has been the venue for international matches both in football and bandy, as well as international track and field athletics competitions. The venue hosted the Norwegian Athletics Championships in 1906, 1911, 1912, 1914, 1917, 1918, 1920, 1922 and 1924.

In 1985 and 1989, the stadium was used for motorcycle speedway and held the final of the Norwegian Individual Speedway Championship.

In 2010, the stadium became the home field of the Oslo Vikings.

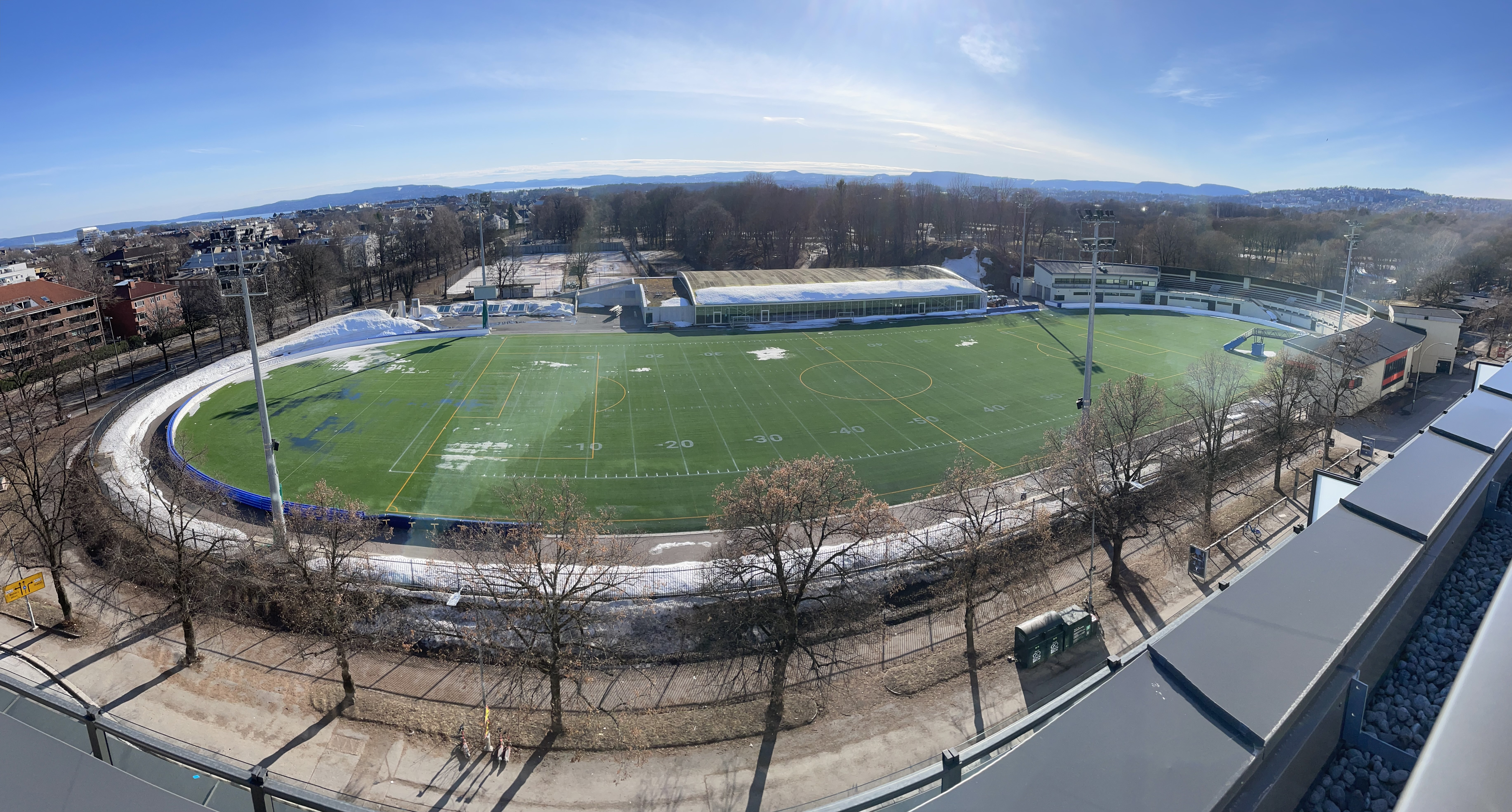
The stadium in 2023

== Speed skating world records at Frogner stadion ==
=== Men's records ===
World records at the old stadium (before 1914)

In 1911, Nikolay Strunnikov skated the 5,000 m distance in a world record time of 8:37.2. This record was originally not approved by ISU, but is now listed among the world records. Oscar Mathisen set two records on 17 and 18 February 1912. The 500 m time was 44.2, while the 10,000 m record was 17:46.3. He improved his own record twice in 1913, first in Trondhjem and later at Frogner, and the new record was 17:22.6.

World records at the new stadium from 1914

Oscar Mathisen set two world records at the opening of the new stadium on 10 January 1914. The time was 43.7 over 500 m and 2:19.4 over 1,500 m. In 1916, Oscar Mathisen set a world record over 5,000 m, with the time 8:36.3. In 1921, Harald Strøm set the record 8:27.7, and in 1922 he improved his own record to 8:26.5, both at Frogner stadion. Strøm's 5,000 m record from 1922 lasted seven years, the longest lasting of all world records set at Frogner, until it was beaten by Ivar Ballangrud in Davos in 1929.

In 1932, Clas Thunberg skated the 1,000 m distance in 1:27.4, better than the world record, but this time is not registered as an official record. In 1936, Allan Potts set a world record over 500 m, with the time 42.4, improving on Hans Engnestangen's time from Davos three years earlier. This record lasted only 12 days, when Engnestangen set another world record in Davos. Ivar Ballangrud set a world record at Frogner over 5,000 m in 1936, with the time 8:17.2, and this record lasted five years.

=== Women's records ===
Several records from Frogner stadion from the 1930s are not listed as official world records. Those that are listed are Synnøve Lie's 50.3 over 500 m in 1934, and Laila Schou Nilsen's 49.3 in 1935. Verné Lesche set a world record over 1,000 m in 1934, with 1:45.7. For the 1,500 m distance, three world records set at Frogner stadium are listed: Synnøve Lie's 3:08.1 in 1932, Undis Blikken's 2:40.0 in 1934, and Laila Schou Nilsen's 2:38.1 in 1937.

== Transport ==
The stadium is served by a nearby light rail station on the Frogner Line; the station is named Frogner stadion. The station is served by line 12, which uses high-floor SL79 Trams.

Preceding station	Trams in Oslo	Following station
Majorstuen Terminus	Line 12	Vigelandsparken towards Kjelsås
