= Jorun Askersrud Tangen =

Norwegian multi-sports athlete (1929–2012)

Jorun Askersrud Tangen, née Askersrud, later married Nygaard (6 May 1929 – 12 October 2012) was a Norwegian cross-country skier and track and field athlete during the 1950s. She was the first Norwegian woman to compete at both the Summer and Winter Olympics, and won a record-setting 39 national titles in track and field. Her individual national titles came between 1950 and 1960, spanning 17 in sprints and hurdles, four in jumps, one in throws and 17 in combined events. In Norwegian championships she also won 16 silver and 11 bronze medals as well as 9 relay gold medals between 1949 and 1961.

== Combined events and hurdles ==
Jorun Askersrud was born in Lunner, and represented the clubs Lunner IL, Oslo IL and from 1950 IL i BUL.

First and foremost, she dominated combined events in Norway during most of the 1950s. In the triathlon event—100 metres, discus throw and high jump—she finished second at the Norwegian championships of 1950 and 1951, behind Unni Sæther and Kirsti Jordet, respectively. Jorun Tangen then started her decade-long domination, winning every Norwegian championship through 1960 (except for 1953). Similarly, the pentathlon was inaugurated in 1951, was absent in 1952 only to return in 1953, and Jorun Tangen again won every Norwegian championship through 1960.

Already in 1951, Askersrud Tangen set her first Norwegian record in the pentathlon. The score was 2,956 points, and she particularly had a better hurdles result than the previous record holder Unni Sæther. Tangen's subsequent improvements came in 1954, 1955 twice, 1956 and 1957, bringing the record to 4,081 points, though the vast embetterment was also caused by a new scoring system. Her first and only Norwegian record in the triathlon came in 1957, which was beaten by Karen Fladset in 1962. The next year, Tangen's national pentathlon record fell to Oddrun Lange.

The other event where she showcased a similar level of domination was the 80 metres hurdles, where she became Norwegian champion in 1951 and every year from 1953 through 1960. Her championship record of 11.9 seconds stood until 1965. Her first Norwegian record came already in 1950, running 12.6 at Jordal Idrettspark. In 1951 she improved to 12.5 at Bislett Stadium and 12.0 at Trondheim Stadium. She registered 11.9 three times before achieving 11.8 seconds in October 1954–a time she equalled no less than five times. She was also the first Norwegian to receive automatic timing in this event, which was 12.51 seconds at the 1952 Olympic Games. (The same thing pertained to her 100 metres time of 13.18 seconds, but there were no official automatic-time national records at the time.)

== International career ==
Jorun Askersrud Tangen competed without reaching the final in the 100 metres and 80 metres hurdles at the Summer Olympics.

She finished 17th in the pentathlon at both the 1954 European Championships and the 1958 European Championships; and competed in the 80 metres hurdles at the 1954 European Championships without reaching the final.

== Winter sports ==
She finished 12th in the 10 kilometre cross-country event at the Winter Olympics in Oslo. Norway had originally opposed cross-country skiing for women at their own 1952 Winter Olympics. Accordingly, there were no Norwegian championships in women's cross-country skiing, accounting for her lack of national titles in this sport.

She was the first Norwegian woman to compete at both the Summer and Winter Olympics, following five male sportsmen who had previously done the same. Askersrud Tangen would however only be followed by one man, Bjørn Oscar Gulbrandsen (1952–1956), and one woman, Jeanette Lunde (1994–2000).

As a speed skater she entered the Norwegian Allround Championships in 1958 in Sandefjord, winning the silver medal, behind the winner Sonja Ackermann-Olsen.

== Sprints and relay ==
Sprints event gave Jorun Askersrud her first medals at a Norwegian championship. Following her silver medal in the 60 metres and her bronze medal in the 200 metres in 1949, she would win gold medals in the 60, 100, 200 and 400 metres. She took back-to-back 100 and 200 metre titles in both 1950 and 1951, as well as a total of three silvers and eight bronze. Her 60 metres golds came in 1951 and 1954, ending with two bronzes before the event was discontinued. Instead, the 400 metres were inaugurated in 1959, with Askersrud Tangen taking the first two gold medals.

Her only individual Norwegian records in sprint events came in the 400 metres, where she became the first Norwegian sub-minute woman in 1959. She ran in 59.7 seconds in Hamar before achieving 59.3 at Bislett Stadium on 30 September. The record stood until 1961. Her personal best time in the 100 metres was 12.2 seconds.

For many years, Jorun Askersrud Tangen also participated on the national team in the 4 x 100 metres relay. Before the mid-1950s, however, only clubs competed in relay. She set one record of 50.8 seconds with the club Oslo IL in 1949, improved to 49.9 in 1955 when she had switched to IL i BUL.

In 1954, the first modern relay record was set by a national team; Askersrud Tangen would set four such records with varying team members: 49.8 seconds in 1954, 49.6 in July 1955 and then 48.7 in September the same year, followd by 48.4 in 1956. This record stood for eight years.

In the field events, Tangen's successes were somewhat more limited. She won the national long jump title in 1951, 1954, 1957 and 1958, taking additional silvers in 1955, 1956 and 1959 and the bronze in 1953. She did set a championship record of 5.36 in 1957, which stood for three years. Her sole throwing gold came in the shot put in 1959, where she also had silvers from 1954, 1955 and 1958.

She was awarded the King's Cup in 1953, the Norwegian Athletics Association Gold Medal in 1958 and became an honorary member of IL i BUL in 1963. Sports statistician Tom A. Schanke called Jorun Askersrud the second most versatile Norwegian sportswoman, after Laila Schou-Nilsen.

== Personal life ==
She married Reidar Tangen in April 1952. Later, she married Ingvar Nygaard in May 1961 in Roa.
