= Thorvaldson =

Thorvaldson may refer to:

- Erik Thorvaldson, a.k.a. Erik the Red (950–1003), the Icelandic-Norwegian Viking founder of Norse Greenland
- Gunnar Thorvaldson (1901-1960), Canadian politician
- Sveinn Thorvaldson (1872–1950), Canadian politician
- Thorbergur Thorvaldson (1883-1965), Icelandic-Canadian chemist
- Thorvaldson Lake, Saskatchewan, Canada

== See also ==
- Thorvaldsen
