= Oslo SK =

Norwegian skating club

Oslo Skøiteklub (OSK) is a sports club in Oslo. Its home arena is Frogner Stadion. The club has departments for speed skating and figure skating.

== Establishment ==
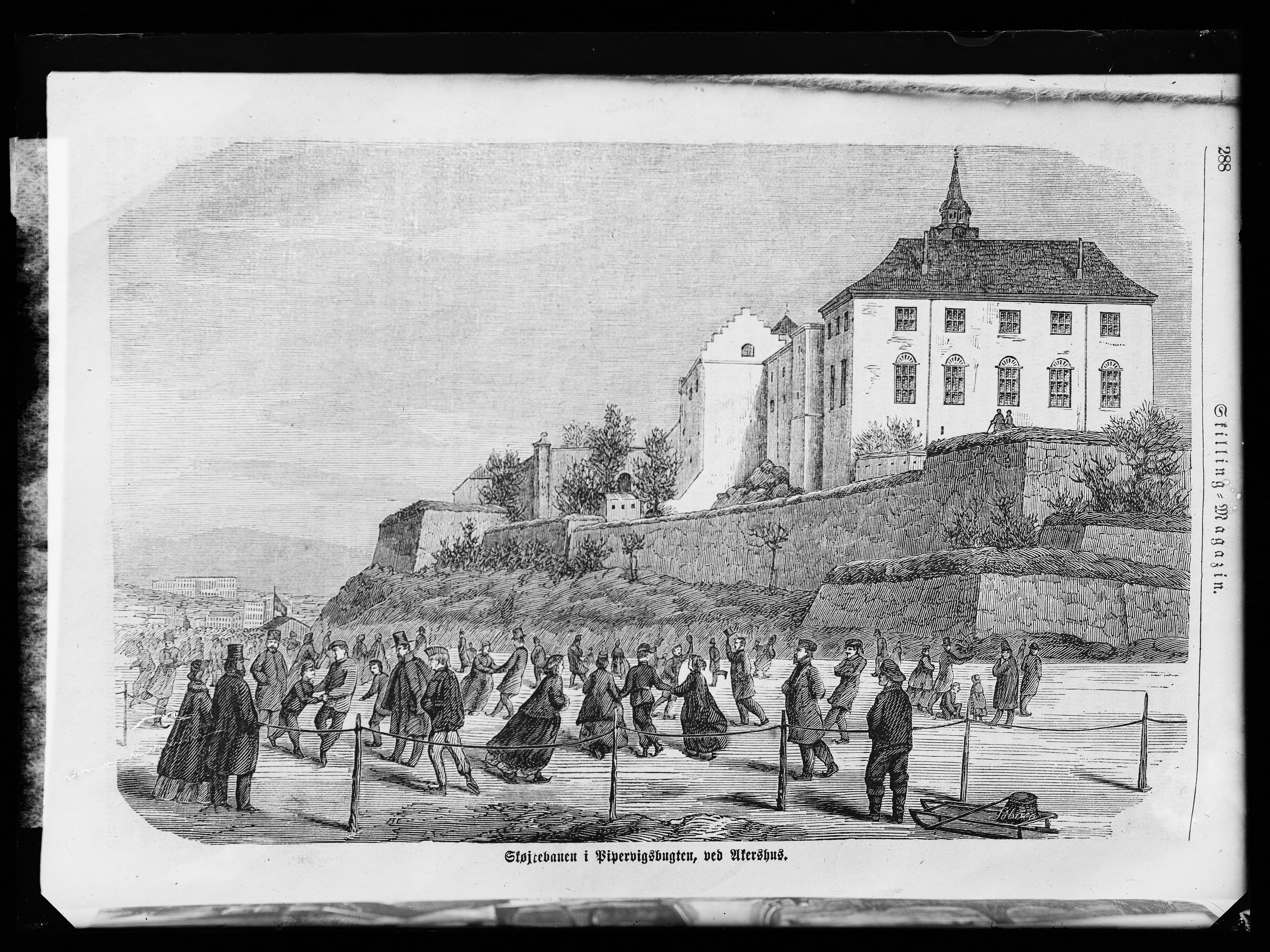
Skating in Piperviksbugten.

Christiania Skøiteklub - later Kristiania Skøiteklub (KSK) - was founded 18 February 1864. The formation of the club was a spin-off from a skating competition on fjord ice in the Oslo Fjord 1 March 1863. The skating sport was quite popular at the time, and the club had about 1000 members after two years, and more than 5000 members in 1870, when Christiania had less than 70000 inhabitants. In 1924, the club changed its name to Oslo Skøiteklub.

== Arena ==
The first skating activities were done on sea ice, outside Vippetangen or in Frognerkilen. Also, Tullinløkken and the Majorstuen stadium were used for skating competitions and performances. In 1901 the club's new stadium opened at Frogner, and this soon became the most important skating arena in Oslo and Norway. Because of the 1914 Jubilee Exhibition in Kristiania, another stadium was built north of the first one. At this stadium a long series of international championships were organized, in both speed skating and figure skating.

== Prominent skaters ==
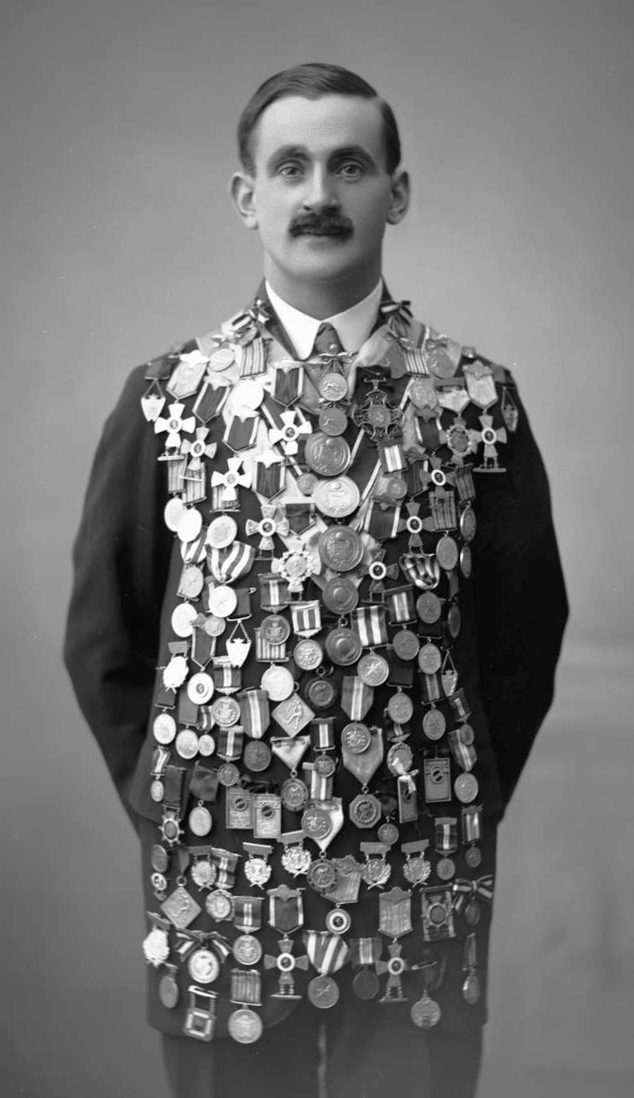
Oscar Mathisen was a member of Kristiania Skøiteklub.

The first stars of the club were Axel Paulsen, inventor of the Axel jump in 1882, who competed in both figure skating and speed skating, and speed skater Rudolf Gundersen. From 1907 and onwards Oscar Mathisen was KSK's big star. In the 1920s Bernt Evensen won several championship titles and Olympic medals for OSK. The club also fostered the figure skater Sonja Henie, who won three successive Olympic Championships, and ten World Championships.

During the 1930s Oslo Skøiteklub played an important role in organizing speed skating for women. Several women who dominated the sport in the 1930s were members of OSK: Synnøve Lie, Undis Blikken and Laila Schou Nilsen.

After the Second World War skaters as Roald Aas and Svein-Erik Stiansen won titles for the club.

== Oscar Mathiesen Award ==
In 1959 Oslo Skøiteklub introduced the Oscar Mathisen Award to commemorate the speed skater Oscar Mathisen (1888–1954). The winner is awarded a miniature of sculptor Arne Durban's statue of Oscar Mathisen. The statue is placed outside Frogner Stadion in Oslo.

== Notable club members ==
- Axel Paulsen
- Rudolf Gundersen
- Oscar Mathisen
- Bernt Evensen
- Michael Staksrud
- Roald Larsen
- Sonja Henie
- Ivar Ballangrud
- Synnøve Lie
- Laila Schou Nilsen
- Finn Helgesen
- Roald Aas
- Nils Aaness
- Svein-Erik Stiansen
- Lasse Efskind

== National presidents ==
These presidents of the Norwegian Skating Association represented Kristiania SK or Oslo SK:

- 1898–1900 : Henrik Olsen Biørn Homan
- 1903–1903 : Karl Ingvar Nandrup
- 1904–1906 : Ivar Hellesnes
- 1906–1907 : Christopher Fougner
- 1908–1911 : Aksel Gresvig
- 1911–1915 : Ludvig Albert Thue
- 1915–1916 : Aksel Gresvig
- 1918–1919 : Knut Ørn Meinich
- 1922–1925 : Knut Ørn Meinich
- 1925–1926 : Ivar Hellesnes
- 1926–1927 : Yngvar Bryn
- 1931–1931 : Oskar Viktor Olsen
- 1932–1937 : Gerhard Karlsen
- 1938–1940 : Henning August Olsen
- 1949–1952 : Oskar Viktor Olsen
- 1952–1954 : Harald Halvorsen
- 1956–1961 : Armand Carlsen
- 1965–1966 : Roald Vatn
- 1966–1969 : Willy Reisvang
- 1973–1975 : Kjell Trystad
- 1999–2001 : Finn Arne Bakke
