= Maggi Kvestad =

Norwegian speed skater

Personal information
- Nationality: Norwegian
- Born: 10 February 1921
- Died: 24 November 2004 (aged 83)

Sport
- Sport: Speed skating
Medal record
Representing Norway
Women's speed skating
World Championships
Bronze medal – third place	1947 Drammen	Allround

Maggi Kvestad (10 February 1921 – 24 November 2004) was a Norwegian speed skater. Her achievements include winning a bronze medal at the allround world championships.

== Biography ==
Kvestad won a bronze medal at the World Allround Speed Skating Championships for Women in 1947, behind Verné Lesche and Else Marie Christiansen. She competed at the 1949 World Championships, where she placed 14th.

She won a silver medal at the national allround championships in 1949, behind Randi Thorvaldsen, and a bronze medal in 1946.
