= Thorvaldsen =

Thorvaldsen is a surname. Notable people with the surname include:

- Bertel Thorvaldsen (1770–1844), Danish/Icelandic sculptor
- Randi Thorvaldsen (1925–2011), Norwegian speedskater
- Thor Thorvaldsen (1909–1987), Norwegian Olympic sailor
- Unn Thorvaldsen (born 1943), Norwegian javelin thrower

== See also ==
- Thorvaldson (disambiguation)
