= Per Ivar Moe =

Norwegian speed skater (born 1944)

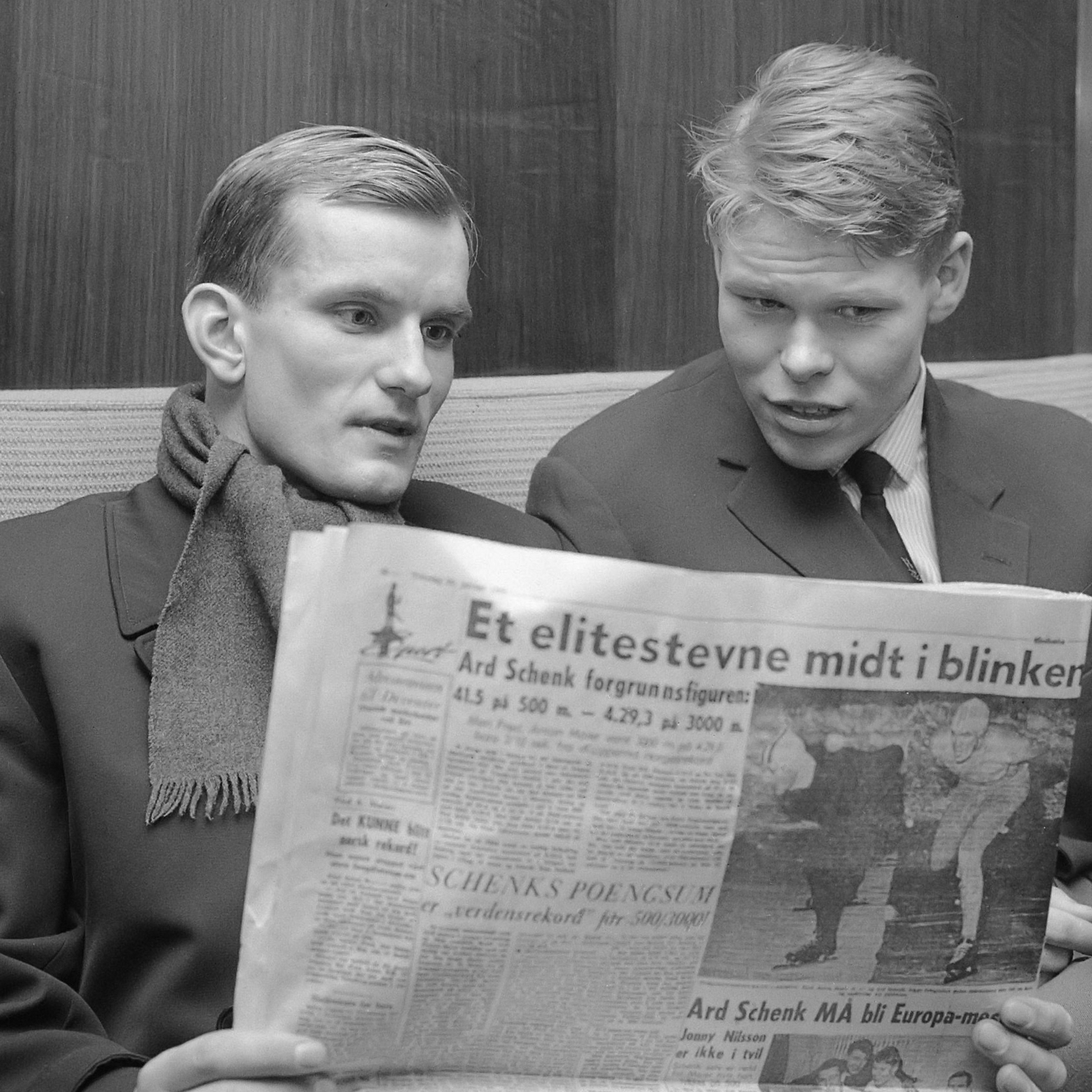
- Svein-Erik Stiansen and Per Ivar Moe (r.) (1966)

Personal information
- Born: 11 November 1944 (age 81) Ålesund, Norway

Sport
- Sport: Speed skating
- Club: Lillehammer SK, Lillehammer; Oslo Idrettslag, Oslo

Achievements and titles
- Personal bests: 500 m: 41.6 (1963); 1000 m: 1:36.5 (1960); 1500 m: 2:06.9 (1966); 3000 m: 4:31.8 (1965); 5000 m: 7:38.6 (1964); 10 000 m: 15:47.8 (1964)
Medal record
Men's Speed Skating
Representing Norway
Olympic Games
| Silver medal – second place | 1964 Innsbruck | 5,000 m |

Per Ivar Moe (born 11 November 1944) is a Norwegian former speed skater.

== Biography ==
In 1963, 18-year-old Per Ivar Moe won bronze at the European Allround Championships, an achievement he would repeat the following year. In addition, in 1964, he became the first in 8 years to beat Knut Johannesen at the Norwegian Championships. That year, he also participated in the 1964 Winter Olympics in Innsbruck and won a silver medal on the 5,000 m in a time of 7:38.6, a mere 0.2 seconds behind Johannesen. At first, it seemed that Moe had won gold when 7:38.7 was displayed as Johannesen's time, but this was quickly corrected to 7:38.4.

In 1965, Moe won silver at the European Championships and two weeks later he became World Allround Champion. For his achievements, he received the 1965 Oscar Mathisen Award and was elected Norwegian Sportsperson of the Year that same year. Moe retired in 1966 to complete his university degree. Per Ivar Moe was in banking business in his professional life. He was Vice President in Nordea, one of the biggest banks in Norway.

== Medals ==
An overview of medals won by Moe at important championships he participated in, listing the years in which he won each:

| Championships | Gold medal | Silver medal | Bronze medal |
|---|---|---|---|
| Winter Olympics | – | 1964 (5,000 m) | – |
| World Allround | 1965 | – | – |
| European Allround | – | 1965 | 1963; 1964 |
| Norwegian Allround | 1964 | 1965 | 1966 |

== Personal records ==
To put these personal records in perspective, the WR column lists the official world records on the dates that Moe skated his personal records.

| Event | Result | Date | Venue | WR |
|---|---|---|---|---|
| 500 m | 41.6 | 23 February 1963 | Karuizawa | 39.5 |
| 1,000 m | 1:36.5 | 17 February 1960 | Hamar | 1:22.8 |
| 1,500 m | 2:06.9 | 26 January 1966 | Davos | 2:06.3 |
| 3,000 m | 4:31.8 | 25 February 1965 | Oslo | 4:27.3 |
| 5,000 m | 7:38.6 | 5 February 1964 | Innsbruck | 7:34.3 |
| 10,000 m | 15:47.8 | 19 January 1964 | Oslo | 15:33.0 |
| Big combination | 178.727 | 14 February 1965 | Oslo | 178.447 |

Moe was number one on the Adelskalender, the all-time allround speed skating ranking, from 26 January 1964 to 13 February 1965 and for 4 more days in January 1966 – a total of 388 days. He has an Adelskalender score of 177.150 points.

Awards
| Preceded by (Soviet Union) Ants Antson | Oscar Mathisen Award; 1965 | Succeeded by (Netherlands) Kees Verkerk |
| Preceded by (Norway) Terje Pedersen | Norwegian Sportsperson of the Year; 1965 | Succeeded by (Norway) Gjermund Eggen |
