= Groven (surname) =

Groven is a surname. Notable people with the surname include:

- Alexander Groven (born 1992, né Hassum), Norwegian football player
- Aud Groven (born 1942), Norwegian speed skater
- Eivind Groven (1901–1977), Norwegian composer and music-theorist
- Rolf Groven (1943–2025), Norwegian painter
- Sigmund Groven (born 1946), Norwegian harmonica player
- Tone Groven Holmboe (1930–2020), Norwegian composer and teacher
