= Erik Vea =

Norwegian speedskater (born 1951)

Erik Vea (born 11 June 1951) is a Norwegian former speedskater.

In 1973, Erik Vea competed for Norway in both the European and World Championships, and finished in 13th and 10th places respectively.

Erik Vea is the subject of Di Derre's song "Er det noen som husker Erik Vea?" ("Does Anyone Remember Eric Vea?"). The subject is taken from the National Championships in 1973 which in the song took place in Larvik, but in reality took place in Notodden. Vea finished in third place in this championship, behind Sten Stensen and Per Willy Guttormsen. He raced for Arbeidernes SK.

Erik Vea was class winner in the unofficial World Cup for veterans in Inzell 29 February 2004.

== Personal records ==
- 500 m - 40.02 seconds
- 1500 m - 2:00.44 minutes
- 5000 m - 7:20.85 minutes
- 10 000 m - 15:34.5 minutes
