= Tom Erik Oxholm =

Norwegian speed skater

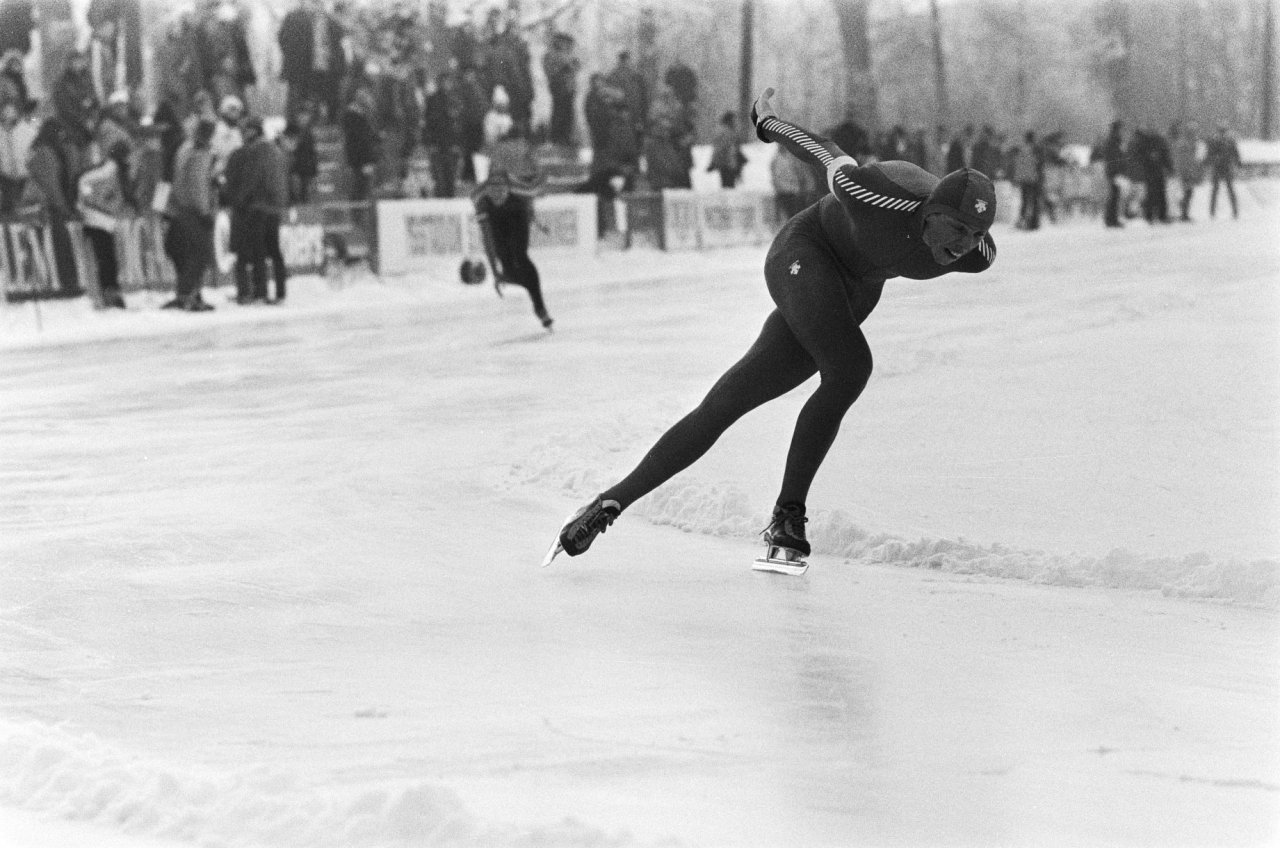
- Oxholm in 1981

Personal information
- Born: 22 February 1959 (age 67) Larvik, Norway
- Height: 1.83 m (6 ft 0 in)
- Weight: 80 kg (176 lb)

Sport
- Country: Norway
- Sport: Speed skating
Medal record
Representing Norway
Men's speed skating
Olympic Games
Bronze medal – third place	1980 Lake Placid	5,000 m
Bronze medal – third place	1980 Lake Placid	10,000 m

Tom Erik Oxholm (born 22 February 1959) is a former speed skater from Norway. He had his best period in the early 1980s.

At the 1980 Winter Olympics in Lake Placid, Oxholm won two bronze medals – on the 5,000 m and the 10,000 m. In addition, he finished third at both the European Allround Championships and the World Allround Championships that same year.

Oxholm was Norwegian Allround Champion in 1980 and 1986. He skated a few seasons for Oslo Skøiteklubb but otherwise represented Idrettsforeningen Fram in Larvik. After his active career, he enjoyed successes as a coach for Ådne Søndrål and Roger Strøm.

== Medals ==
An overview of medals won by Oxholm at important championships he participated in, listing the years in which he won each:

Championships	Gold medal	Silver medal	Bronze medal
Winter Olympics	–	–	1980 (5,000 m); 1980 (10,000 m)
World Allround	–	–	1980
World Cup	–	–	–
European Allround	–	–	1980
Norwegian Allround	1980; 1986	1982; 1987	1983; 1984
Norwegian Single Distance	–	–	1988 (1,500 m)

== Personal records ==
To put these personal records in perspective, the WR column lists the official world records on the dates that Oxholm skated his personal records.

Event	Result	Date	Venue	WR
500 m	39.58	17 March 1983	Medeo	36.91
1,000 m	1:16.8	9 November 1984	Inzell	1:12.58
1,500 m	1:57.19	23 January 1983	Davos	1:54.79
3,000 m	4:09.24	26 February 1981	Inzell	4:04.06
5,000 m	7:05.58	17 March 1983	Medeo	6:54.66
10,000 m	14:36.60	23 February 1980	Lake Placid	14:34.33
Big combination	166.148	18 March 1983	Medeo	162.973

Oxholm has an Adelskalender score of 164.031 points.
