= Staksrud =

Staksrud is a surname.

Notable people with the surname Staksrud include:

- Michael Staksrud (1908 - 1940), Norwegian speed skater
- Federico Staksrud (born 1996), Argentine professional tennis and pickleball player
