= Ragnhild Mikkelsen =

Norwegian speed skater (1931–2008)

Medal record

Representing Norway

Women's speed skating

World Championships
Bronze medal – third place	1951 Eskilstuna	Allround

Gerd Ragnhild Mikkelsen Pedersen (born Gerd Ragnhild Mikkelsen; 26 March 1931 – 31 August 2008) was a former Norwegian female speed skater. She won a bronze medal at the World Allround Speed Skating Championships for Women in 1951, behind Eevi Huttunen and Randi Thorvaldsen.

She won a silver medal at the national allround championships in 1950 behind Randi Thorvaldsen, and a bronze medal in 1951.
