= Nystedt =

Nystedt is a surname. Notable people with the surname include:

- Knut Nystedt (1915–2014), Norwegian composer
- Minna Nystedt (born 1967), Norwegian speed skater
