= Bjørn Nyland (speed skater) =

Norwegian speed skater

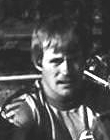

Personal information
- Nationality: Norwegian
- Born: 8 October 1962 (age 63) Lillestrøm, Norway

Sport
- Sport: Speed skating
Medal record
Representing Norway
Men's speed skating
European Championships
Bronze medal – third place	1983 The Hague	Allround
Junior World Championships
Gold medal – first place	1981 Elverum	Allround

Bjørn Arne Nyland (born 8 October 1962) is a Norwegian speed skater.

He was born in Lillestrøm, and represented the clubs SK Ceres and Aktiv SK. He competed at the 1984 Winter Olympics in Sarajevo. He won a bronze medal at the 1983 European allround speed skating championships. In 1987 he became norwegian national allround speed skating champion at Hamar stadion, Hamar. The same season he also became the first national single distance champion of the 1500 meters at Stavanger, then outdoors at Sørmarka stadium, in the same single distance championships he also got a silver on the 1.000 meter behind Frode Rønning.
