= SK Ceres =

Norwegian sports team

- Full name: Sportsklubben Ceres
- Founded: 25 September 1921 (104 years ago)
- Home ground: Lillestrøm Stadion

Sportsklubben Ceres (The sports club Ceres) was founded September 25, 1921, and is a multidisciplinary team for cycling, cross-country skiing and triathlon and ice skating.

SK Ceres is a member of the Norwegian Confederation of Sports through the Akershus Sports Club. The club is also a member of the special federations of Norwegian Cycling Federation, Norwegian Ski Federation, Norwegian Skating Association and Norway's Triathlon Association (here as a separate group as there are no circles for this branch in Norway), through the Akershus Cycle Circle, Akershus Ski Circuit and Akershus and Oslo Skating Circuits. It was earlier a member of the Workers' Sports Federation.

SK Ceres belongs in Skedsmo municipality and is a member of Skedsmo Sports Council.

== Cycling ==
The sports club was technical host for the norwegian championships in track cycling 1958.

== Speed skating ==
The sports club was technical host for the norwegian junior all-round speed skating championships for men in 1952 and 1983, both held at the Lillestrøm Stadion. The speed skating relay team of Linda Olsen, Jane Iren Nielsen and Trude Nielsen are the national speed skating relay champions in both senior and junior in 1990.

=== Famous skaters ===
- Kay Stenshjemmet – 1980 double olympic silvermedalist (1500 meter and 5000 meter), behind Eric Heiden.
- Bjørn Nyland – 1981 speed skating junior world champion, and 1983 european speed skating bronzemedalist.
- Geir Karlstad – 1992 speed skating olympic champion (5000 meter), and 1982 speed skating junior world champion.
- Frode Syvertsen – 1988 speed skating olympian.
- Øystein Hammeren – 1989 norwegian single distances speed skating champion 10.000 meter.
- Jane Iren Nielsen – member of the norwegian women's speed skating relay champions for 1990.
- Linda Olsen – member of the norwegian women's speed skating relay champions for 1990, and 5 time world speed skating sprint championships-participant (1994, 1995, 2000, 2001 and 2002).
- Trude Nielsen – member of the norwegian women's speed skating relay champions for 1990.
