= Synnøve Lie =

Norwegian speed skater

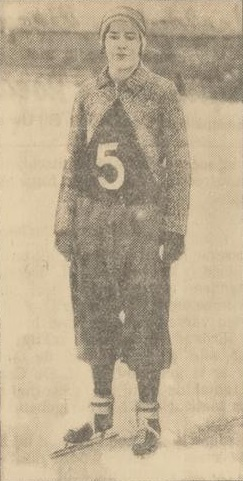
Lie in 1934

Synnøve Lie (22 August 1908 – 9 July 1980) was a Norwegian speed skater.

== Biography ==
Representing Oslo Skøiteklub (Oslo Skating Club), Lie became Norwegian Allround Champion in 1933 after having already won the unofficial Norwegian Allround Championships the year before. At the unofficial 1933 World Allround Championships, she won silver, something she would repeat in 1935, while in 1934, she won bronze. In 1936, the World Allround Championships became official and Lie won the bronze medal there. In 1937, she would win silver and in 1938 bronze again.

== Medals ==
An overview of medals won by Lie at important championships she participated in, listing the years in which she won each:

Championships	Gold medal	Silver medal	Bronze medal
World Allround	–	(1933) (1935); 1937	(1934); 1936; 1938
Norwegian Allround	(1932); 1933	1936; 1937; 1939	1934; 1935; 1938; 1940

Note that the World Allround Championships were unofficial from 1933 to 1935 and that the Norwegian Allround Championships were unofficial in 1932.

== World records ==
Over the course of her career, Lie skated five world records:

Event	Result	Date	Venue
1,500 m	3:08.1	7 March 1932	Oslo-Frogner
1,000 m	1:51.2	20 March 1932	Brandbu
500 m	56.0	20 March 1932	Brandbu
1,000 m	1:48.1	14 January 1934	Davos
500 m	50.3	12 February 1934	Oslo-Frogner

== Norwegian records ==
Over the course of her career, Lie skated seven Norwegian records:

Event	Result	Date	Venue
1,500 m	3:08.1	7 March 1932	Oslo-Frogner
1,000 m	1:51.2	20 March 1932	Brandbu
500 m	56.0	20 March 1932	Brandbu
500 m	53.9	6 February 1933	Oslo-Frogner
1,500 m	2:58.7	6 February 1933	Oslo-Frogner
500 m	50.3	12 February 1934	Oslo-Frogner
5000 m	9:44.7	10 February 1938	Oslo-Frogner

== Personal records ==
To put these personal records in perspective, the WR column lists the official world records on the dates that Lie skated her personal records.

Event	Result	Date	Venue	WR
500 m	49.9	30 January 1937	Davos	49.3
1,000 m	1:42.2	31 January 1937	Davos	1:42.3
1,500 m	2:43.2	24 February 1938	Sandefjord	2:38.1
3,000 m	5:31.8	30 January 1937	Davos	6:12.0
5,000 m	9:29.6	31 January 1937	Davos	10:15.3
Old combination	213.260	31 January 1937	Davos	none

Note that Lie's personal records on the 1,000 m, the 3,000 m, and the 5,000 m were not world records because in all three cases Laila Schou Nilsen skated faster at the same tournament. Nilsen's respective times were 1:38.8, 5:29.6, and 9:28.3. Also note that the Old combination was not an official world record event, as governed by the International Skating Union, until 1949.
