= Else Marie Christiansen =

Norwegian speed skater (1921–2017)

Personal information
- Nationality: Norwegian
- Born: 13 May 1921
- Died: 19 September 2017 (aged 96)

Sport
- Sport: Speed skating
Medal record
Representing Norway
Women's speed skating
World Championships
Silver medal – second place	1947 Drammen	Allround

Else Marie Karlsen (born Else Marie Christiansen; 13 May 1921 – 19 September 2017) was a Norwegian female speed skater. She won a silver medal at the World Allround Speed Skating Championships for Women in 1947, behind Verné Lesche from Finland.

She won silver medals at the national allround championships in 1947 and 1948, both times behind Randi Thorvaldsen.
