= Bjørn Tveter =

Norwegian speed skater

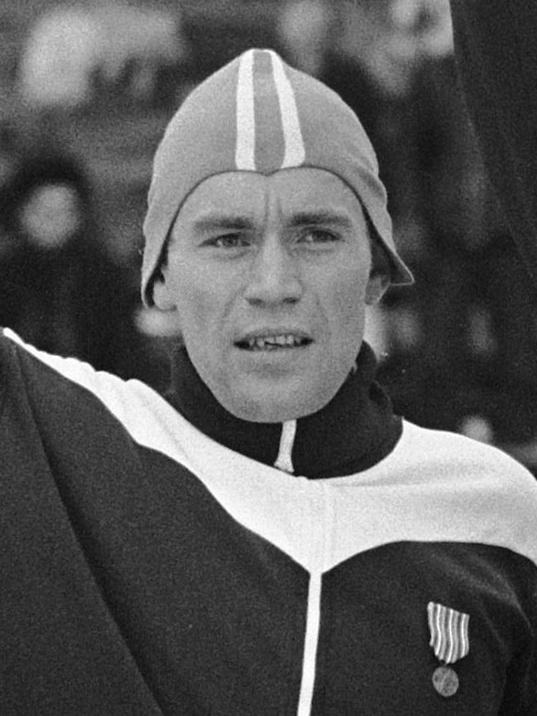
- Tveter at the 1968 World Championships

Personal information
- Born: 13 June 1944 (age 82) Sandefjord, Norway
- Height: 187 cm (6 ft 2 in)
- Weight: 90 kg (198 lb)

Sport
- Sport: Speed skating
- Club: Tønsbergs Turnforening

Achievements and titles
- Personal best(s): 500 m – 39.8 (1972); 1000 m – 1:20.8 (1971); 1500 m – 2:02.17 (1974); 5000 m – 7:20.2 (1970); 10000 m – 15:35.27 (1974)

Bjørn Tveter (born 13 June 1944) is a former Norwegian speed skater. He competed in the 1500 m event at the 1968 and 1972 Winter Olympics and finished fifth and fourth, respectively. He won a bronze medal over this distance at the 1968 World Allround Championships, placing seventh overall.

In 1973, Tveter joined the professional skating league, and in 1974 he won gold medals at the Professional European Allround Championships. The professional league was dissolved in 1974.

Tveter's younger brother Øyvind was also an Olympic speed skater.
