= Frode Syvertsen =

Norwegian speed skater

Personal information
- Nationality: Norwegian
- Born: Frode Hermann Syvertsen; 14 January 1963 Askøy Municipality, Norway

Sport
- Country: Norway
- Sport: Speed skating
- Club: Sportsklubben Ceres (1975/76–1991/92)
Medal record
Norwegian Allround Championships
Bronze medal – third place	1987 Hamar	Allround
Bronze medal – third place	1988 Oslo	Allround
Bronze medal – third place	1989 Hundorp	Allround
Norwegian Single Distance Championships
Silver medal – second place	1987 Stavanger	5000 m
Silver medal – second place	1988 Hundorp	5000 m
Silver medal – second place	1989 Tynset	5000 m
Silver medal – second place	1989 Tynset	10000 m

Frode Hermann Syvertsen (born 14 January 1963) is a Norwegian speed skater, born in Askøy Municipality. He competed at the 1988 Winter Olympics in Calgary.

He placed third in the all-round national championships in 1987, 1988 and 1989.
