= Rudolf Gundersen =

Norwegian speed skater

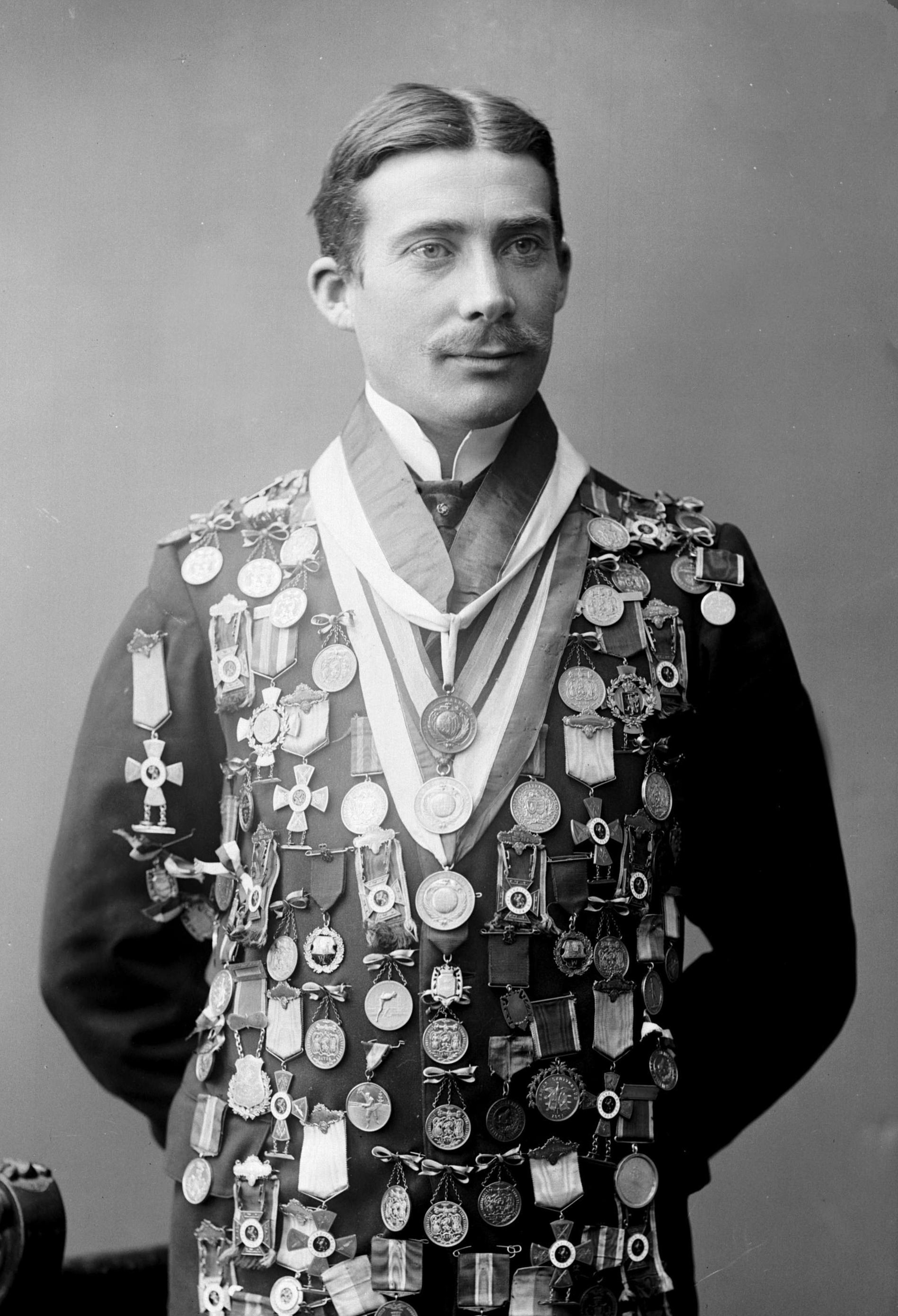
Rudolf Gundersen

Rudolf Gundersen (6 December 1879 – 21 August 1946) was a Norwegian speed skater. He represented Kristiania Skøiteklub and was among the world's best skaters around the start of the 20th century. Gundersen made his Norwegian National Allround Championships debut in 1899 and promptly finished second, an achievement he would repeat the next year. In 1901, Gundersen became both Norwegian and European Allround Champion. In 1904, Gundersen won his second European Allround title and in 1906, he became European Allround Champion for the third and last time, while setting a new world record on the 500 m during those championships. His dominance at the European Allround Championships is illustrated by the fact that at the four European Allround Championships Gundersen participated in, he finished either first or second on every distance, finishing in first place ten times and in second place six times.

In addition to winning prizes for speed, Gundersen also won several prizes for best skating style. After retiring from top skating, Gundersen skated veteran races for many years. In 1934, he was given honorary membership of his club, Oslo Skøiteklub. Note that in 1925, the city Kristiania was renamed to Oslo and as a result, Kristiania Skøiteklub was renamed to Oslo Skøiteklub. Gundersen died in 1946 at the age of 66.

== Medals ==
An overview of medals won by Gundersen at important championships he participated in, listing the years in which he won each. Note that he won only the medals given for the years that are not within parentheses. During the time that Gundersen participated in the World and European Allround Championships, silver and bronze medals were never awarded. In addition, an overall winner would not be declared if none of the skaters had been dominant enough, as measured in the number of first places on the individual distances. If the samalog system had been in use then, as it is today (as of 2007), then Gundersen would have won the additional medals listed within parentheses:

Championships	Gold medal	Silver medal	Bronze medal
World Allround	(1902)	(1901)	(1900) (1904) (1906)
European Allround	1901; 1904; 1906	(1902)	–
Norwegian Allround	1901; 1902; 1905	1899; 1900; 1903	–

== World records ==
Over the course of his career, Gundersen skated one world record:

Discipline	Time	Date	Location
500 m	0.44,8	January 27, 1906	(Switzerland) DavosDavos

Source: SpeedSkatingStats.com

== Personal records ==
To put these personal records in perspective, the WR column lists the official world records on the dates that Gundersen skated his personal records.

Event	Result	Date	Venue	WR
500 m	44.8	27 January 1906	Davos	45.2
1,000 m	1:34.4	29 January 1906	Davos	1:34.0
1,500 m	2:26.6	19 January 1902	Davos	2:22.6
5,000 m	8:54.0	18 January 1902	Davos	8:37.6
10,000 m	18:41.0	19 January 1902	Davos	17:50.6

Gundersen has an Adelskalender score of 203.116 points. His highest ranking on the Adelskalender was a fourth place.
