= Heidi Skjeggestad =

Norwegian speed skater

Personal information
- Nationality: Norwegian
- Born: 28 January 1970

Sport
- Sport: Speed skating
- Club: IF Fram Larvik

Achievements and titles
- World finals: 1 (1990)

Heidi Skjeggestad (born 28 January 1970) is a Norwegian former speed skater.

Her achievements include two victories at the Norwegian Allround Championships, in 1989 and 1990. She competed in the World Allround Speed Skating Championships for Women in 1990.
