= Allan Potts =

American speed skater (1904–1952)

Personal information
- Born: May 14, 1904 Brooklyn, New York
- Died: November 5, 1952 (aged 48) New York City Rink, New York

Sport
- Country: United States
- Sport: Speed skating

Achievements and titles
- Olympic finals: 1932 Winter Olympics; 1936 Winter Olympics

Allan W. Potts (May 14, 1904 – November 5, 1952) was an American National Indoor and Outdoor Champion speed skater who competed in the 1932 Winter Olympics and in the 1936 Winter Olympics. Inducted May 18, 1967, at Detroit, Michigan, into The National Speedskating Hall of Fame and also once known as The Fastest Human.

He was born in Brooklyn and died in New York City.

In 1932 he participated in the 500 metres event but was eliminated in the heats.

Four years later he finished sixth in the Speed skating at the 1936 Winter Olympics, set a world record in men's 500-metre shortly before the 1936 winter Olympics, and made the time of 42.4 seconds and 32nd in men's 1500-metre.

== World records ==
Discipline	Time	Date	Location
500 m	0.42,4	January 18, 1936	(Norway) Oslo

Source: SpeedSkatingStats.com

Records
Preceded by (Norway) Hans Engnestangen	Men's 500 m World Record Holder; January 18, 1936 – January 30, 1937	Succeeded by (Norway) Hans Engnestangen
