= Undis Blikken =

Norwegian speed skater

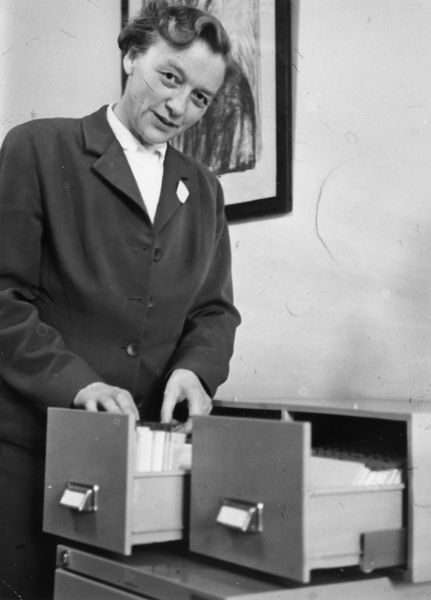
- Undis Blikken in 1962.

Personal information
- Nationality: Norwegian
- Born: 7 May 1914
- Died: 22 January 1992 (aged 77)

Sport
- Sport: Speed skating
Medal record
Women's speed skating
World Allround Speed Skating Championships
Gold medal – first place	1934 Oslo (unofficial)	Allround

Undis Blikken (7 May 1914 – 22 January 1992) was a Norwegian female speed skating pioneer.

She won the unofficial World Allround Speed Skating Championships for Women in 1934, ahead of Verné Lesche from Finland. Her winning time on the 1500 metres distance (2.40,0) was also world record for women.

She participated at the official world championships in 1936 and 1938. In 1938 she finished 5th overall, and 3rd on two of the distances.

At the Norwegian Allround Speed Skating Championships she won gold medals in 1934, 1936 and 1938, "alternating" with Laila Schou Nilsen, and silver medals in 1933, 1935 and 1940. She represented the club Oslo SK.

She represented the Liberal Party in Oslo city council. She was a parliamentary ballot candidate from the constituency Hedmark in 1945 and from Oslo in 1957 and 1961.

She has got a road named after her in Åsnes kommune.
