= Øyvind Tveter =

Norwegian speed skater

Personal information
- Born: 28 March 1954 (age 71); Larvik, Norway

Sport
- Sport: Speed skating

Øyvind Tveter (born 28 March 1954) is a former Norwegian speed skater who competed internationally in the 1970s and 1980s. At the 1980 Winter Olympics in Lake Placid he finished 5th in the 5000 metres and 5th in the 10000 metres.

Tveter's elder brother Bjørn was also a speed skater who competed in international championships and in the Olympics.
