= Stian Bjørge =

Norwegian speed skater

Personal information
- Nationality: Norwegian
- Born: 31 July 1976 (age 49) Skien, Norway

Sport
- Sport: Speed skating

Stian Bjørge (born 31 July 1976) is a Norwegian speed skater, born in Skien. He competed in the 5000 m at the 2002 Winter Olympics in Salt Lake City.
