= Thorvaldson Lake =

Lake in Saskatchewan, Canada

- Location of the lake in Saskatchewan Thorvaldson Lake (Canada)
- Location: Northern Administration District, Saskatchewan
- Coordinates: 55°49′N 104°28′W
- Part of: Churchill River drainage basin
- Basin countries: Canada
- Settlements: None

Thorvaldson Lake is a fresh water lake in Northern Saskatchewan, named after Thorbergur Thorvaldson in 1966.

== See also ==
- List of lakes of Saskatchewan
