= Kristian Strøm =

Norwegian speed skater

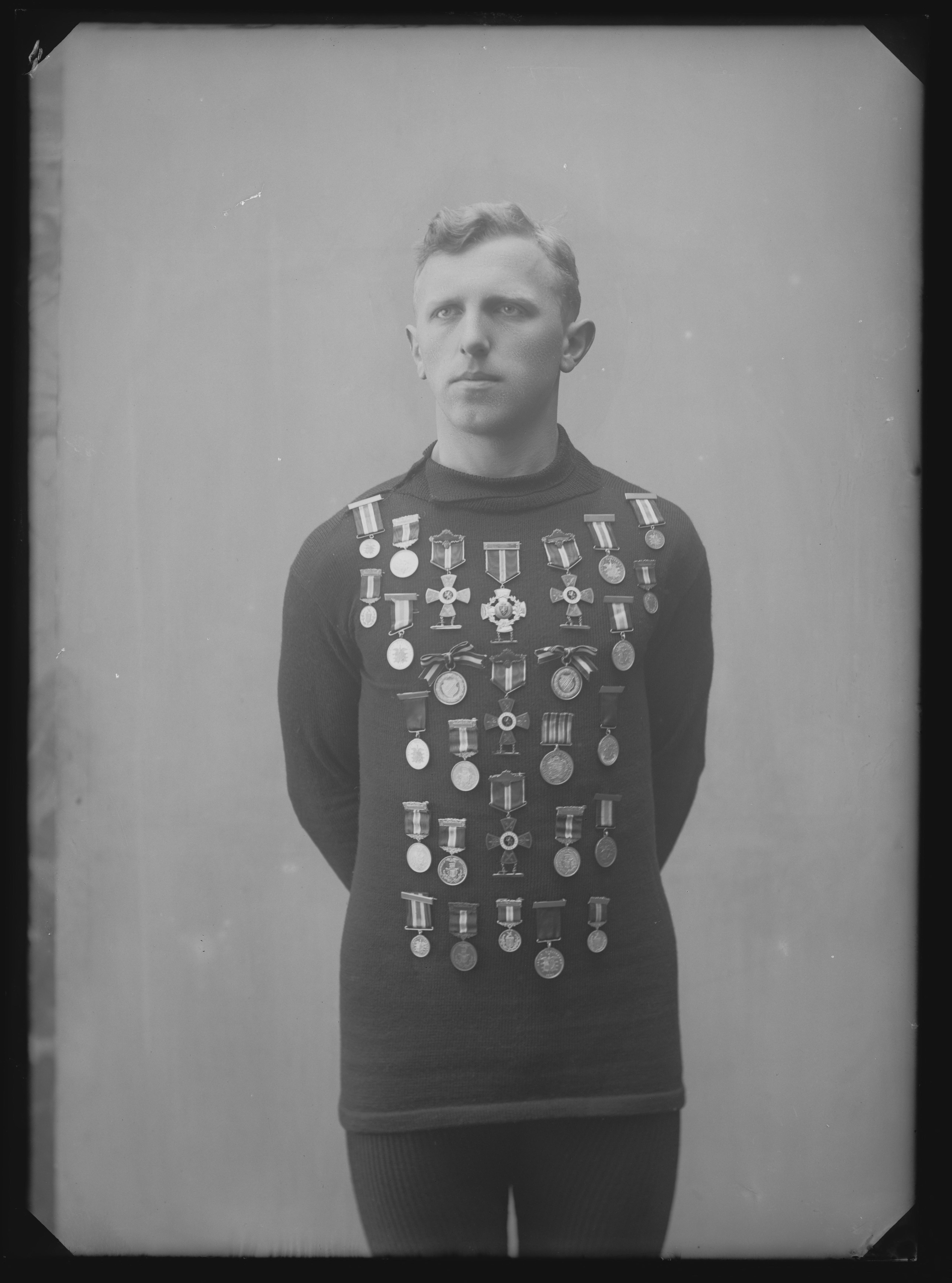
Kristian Strøm

Kristian Strøm (24 December 1892 – 10 November 1980) was a Norwegian speedskater.

He set a world record in 5000 m in 1917, when he improved Oscar Mathisen's previous record in Trondheim. This record lasted four years, until it was beaten by Harald Strøm in 1921.

Strøm became national all-round champion in 1916, 1917, 1919 and 1920, and took five King's Cups.

He represented the club Hortens SK, and chaired the Norwegian Skating Association from 1929 to 1931.

== World record ==
Discipline	Time	Date	Location
5000 m	8.33,7	February 4, 1917	(Norway) Trondheim

Source: SpeedSkatingStats.com

Sporting positions
Preceded by Anders Melteig	President of the Norwegian Skating Association; 1929–1931	Succeeded by Oskar Viktor Olsen
