= Anette Tønsberg =

Norwegian speed skater

Personal information
- Born: 2 April 1970 (age 54); Lørenskog, Norway

Sport
- Sport: Speed skating
- Club: Aurskog/Finstadbru SK

Anette Tønsberg (born 2 April 1970) is a Norwegian speed skater.

== Biography ==
Anette Tønsberg was born in Lørenskog and represented the club Aurskog/Finstadbru SK. She competed at the 1992 Winter Olympics in Albertville and at the 1998 Winter Olympics in Nagano.

She was Norwegian all-round champion 1994-1998 and in 2002. Her personal best times were 40.24 in the 500 metres (1999); 1:18.50 in the 1000 metres (1999); 2:00.10 in the 1500 metres (1998); 4:12.92 in the 3000 metres (1998) and 7:21.57 in the 5000 metres (1999).

During her career she set 23 Norwegian speed-skating records, at the distances 1500 m, 3000 m, and 5000 m, and all-round.
