= Sigrid Sundby =

Norwegian speed skater

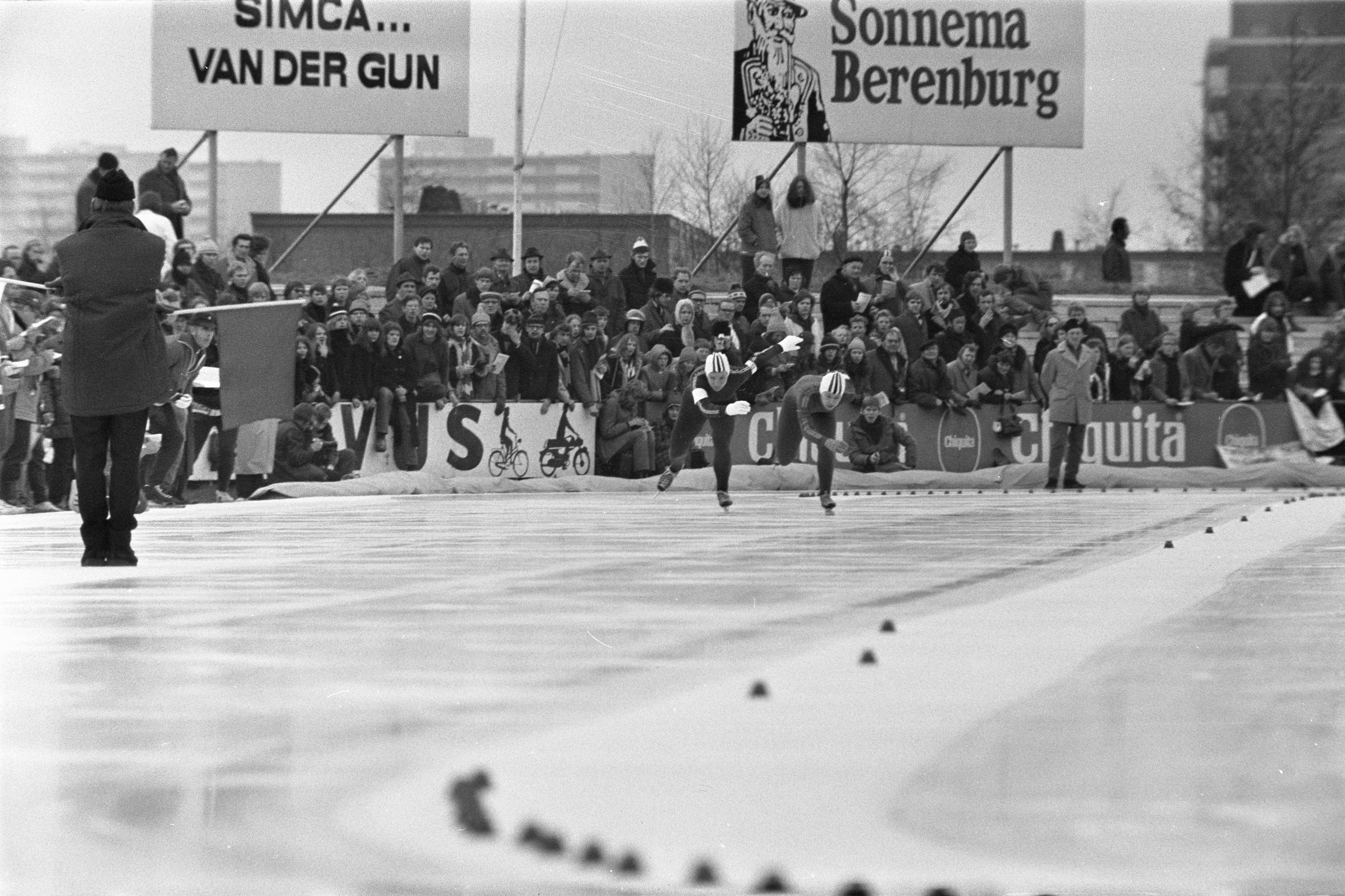
- Sundby at the 1972 World Allround Speed Skating Championships for Women

Personal information
- Full name: Sigrid Milfrid Sundby
- Nationality: Norwegian
- Born: 13 July 1942 Rakkestad
- Died: 24 July 1977 (aged 35) Oslo

Sport
- Sport: Speed skating
Medal record
Representing Norway
Women's speed skating
World Allround Speed Skating Championships
Bronze medal – third place	1970 West Allis	Allround

Sigrid Milfrid Sundby (13 July 1942 – 24 July 1977) was a Norwegian speed skater who competed internationally in the 1960s and 1970s.

== Personal life ==
Sundby was born in Rakkestad on 13 July 1942.

== Skating career ==
She competed at the Winter Olympics in 1968, 1972 and 1976. Her best Olympic results were 4th in the 1500 metres, 6th in 500 metres, and 6th in 1000 metres at the 1968 Winter Olympics in Grenoble. She won a bronze medal at the World Allround Speed Skating Championships for Women in 1970.

Sundby dominated women's skating nationally for about a decade, winning the Norwegian allround championships in 1963, 1964, 1965, 1966, 1967, 1968, 1969, 1970 and 1973. She also won two national sprint titles.

Sundby died in Oslo on 24 July 1977, 35 years old.
