= Aud Groven =

Norwegian speed skater

Aud Groven Halvorsen
Personal information
- Nationality: (Norway) Norwegian
- Born: Aud Ingebjørg Groven; 2 May 1942 (age 84)
- Years active: 1958/59–1964/65

Sport
- Sport: Women's speed skating
- Club: Vågå IL ( –1963/64); Aktiv SK (1964/65–)

Aud Groven
Medal record

Representing Norway

Women's speed skating

Women's Allround National Championships (Norway)
Silver medal – second place	1961 Allround	Rakkestad 1961
Silver medal – second place	1962 Allround	Hamar 1962
Bronze medal – third place	1964 Allround	Larvik 1964

Aud Ingebjørg Groven Halvorsen (born 2 May 1942) is a former Norwegian speed skater who took part in national and international speed skating competitions and represented Norway and the Norwegian sports club Vågå IL.

She won her first medal in the senior national championship at the 1961 Women's Allround National Championship in Rakkestad.

== Personal records ==
Distance	Time	Date	Place	Venue	Race
500 m	50.0	19 February 1961	Vinstra	Kåja Stadium	
1,000 m	1:44.7	2 January 1964	Oslo	Bislett Stadium	1964 New Year Race
1,500 m	2:45.5	19 January 1965	Nordstrand		
3,000 m	5:56.9	31 January 1965	Horten	Lystlunden Stadium	1965 Allround National Championships
