= Aktiv SK =

Norwegian speed skating club

Aktiv Skøyteklubb ("Active Skating Club"), formerly Arbeidernes Skøyteklubb (Workers' Skating Club") is a Norwegian speed skating club from Oslo.

The club was founded as Arbeidernes Cykleklubb in 1924, and adopted Arbeidernes Skøyteklubb in 1927. It was a member of the Workers' Sports Federation. After the discontinuation of the Workers' Sports Federation, it retained its worker name until 1978. It then went by ASK; from 2001 Aktiv Skøyteklubb. Its home track is Valle Hovin, formerly Jordal stadion.

Well-known speed skaters include Berit Haugård, Knut Johannesen, Per Willy Guttormsen, Sigrid Sundby Dybedahl, Ivar Eriksen, Kai Arne Engelstad, Bjørn Nyland, Frode Rønning, Geir Karlstad, Petter Andersen and Gerd Inger De Groot.
