= Nils Aaness =

Norwegian speed skater (1936–2024)

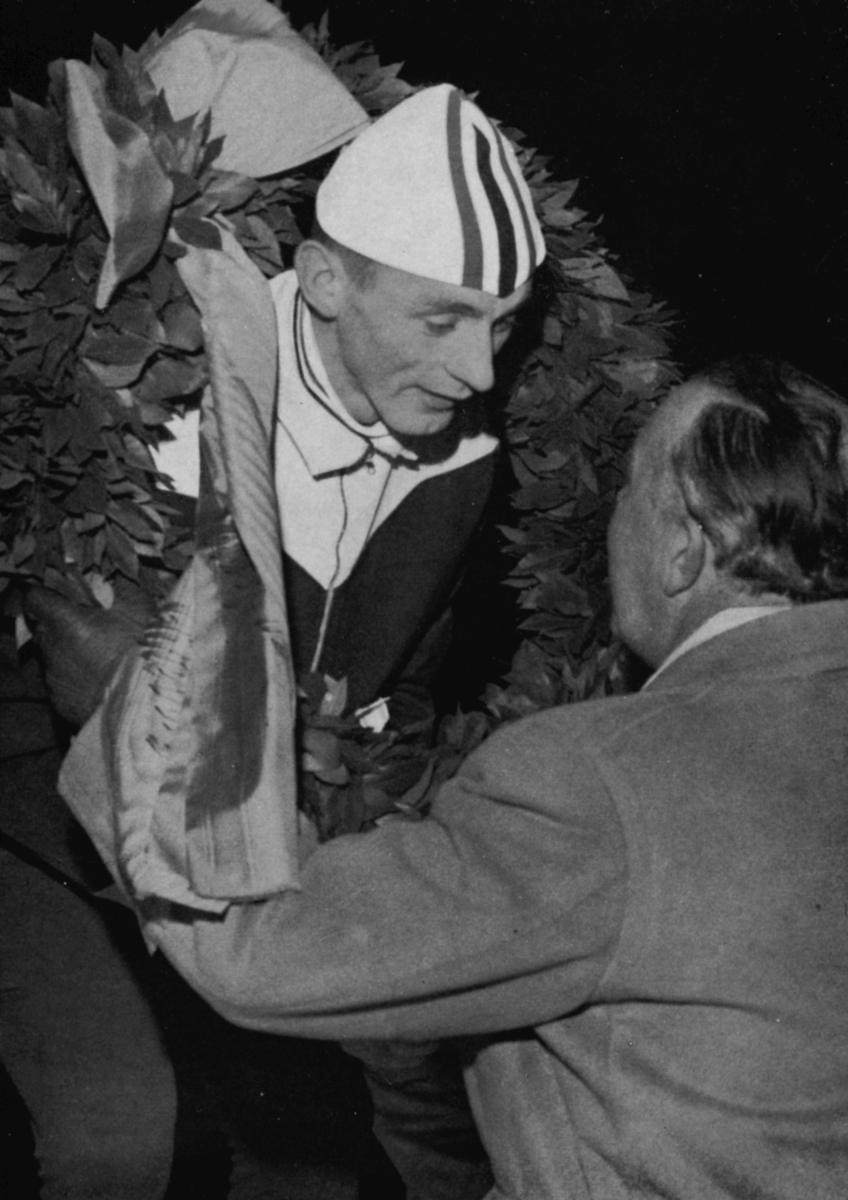
Nils Egil Aaness receives the laurel wreath from Prince Bertil at 1963 European Allround Speed Skating Championships for men at Nya Ullevi, Gothenburg.

Nils Egil Aaness (31 January 1936 – 24 December 2024) was a Norwegian speed skater who competed in the 1960 and 1964 Winter Olympics.

== Biography ==
Aaness competed on the Norwegian national team from 1959 to 1965, and thus became part of the Norwegian speedskating revolution under the trainer Stein Johnson. His best season was 1962/1963, when he won silver at the Norwegian Allround Championships, skated a world record on the big combination one week later (in late January), became European Allround Champion in Gothenburg early February, and won bronze at the World Allround Speed Skating Championships of Karuizawa three weeks after that.

Nils Aaness had his best years alongside Knut Johannesen, and usually ended up a good number two after him. Aaness won a total of three silver medals and one bronze medal at the Norwegian Championships – every time behind Johannesen.

Aaness died on 24 December 2024, at the age of 88.

== Medals ==
An overview of medals won by Aaness at important championships he participated in, listing the years in which he won each:

Championships	Gold medal	Silver medal	Bronze medal
Winter Olympics	–	–	–
World Allround	–	–	1963
European Allround	1963	–	–
Norwegian Allround	–	1961; 1962; 1963	1964

== Records ==
=== World record ===
Over the course of his career, Aaness skated one world record:

Discipline	Time	Date	Location
Big combination	180.560	27 January 1963	(Norway) Oslo

Source: SpeedSkatingStats.com

=== Personal records ===
To put these personal records in perspective, the WR column lists the official world records on the dates that Aaness skated his personal records.

Event	Result	Date	Venue	WR
500 m	41.6	26 January 1963	Oslo	40.2
1,000 m	1:26.7	25 February 1964	Oslo	1:22.8
1,500 m	2:10.6	28 February 1960	Squaw Valley	2:06.3
3,000 m	4:35.0	25 February 1965	Oslo	4:27.3
5,000 m	7:42.8	26 January 1963	Oslo	7:45.6
10,000 m	15:54.9	24 February 1963	Karuizawa	15:46.6

Note that Aaness's personal record on the 5,000 m was not a world record because Knut Johannesen skated 7:37.8 at the same tournament.

Aaness has an Adelskalender score of 179.158 points. His highest ranking on the Adelskalender was a second place.

Awards
Preceded by (Sweden) Jonny Nilsson	Oscar Mathisen Award; 1963	Succeeded by (Soviet Union) Ants Antson
