= Steinar Johansen =

Norwegian speed skater

Steinar Kjetil Johansen (born 27 February 1972) is a Norwegian speed skater. He was born in Holmestrand. He competed at the 1992 Winter Olympics in Albertville, at the 1994 Winter Olympics in Lillehammer, and at the 1998 Winter Olympics in Nagano.
