= Thorbergur Thorvaldson =

Icelandic-Canadian chemist

- Born: August 24, 1883; Iceland
- Died: October 4, 1965 (aged 82); Saskatoon, Saskatchewan
- Occupation: Chemist

Thorbergur Thorvaldson (August 24, 1883 – October 4, 1965) was an Icelandic-Canadian chemist. He was the head of the Department of Chemistry at the University of Saskatchewan.

Thorvaldson and his team at the National Research Council developed a sulphate-resistant cement in 1919 which prevented decay and deterioration in existing structures. He served as president of the Canadian Institute of Chemistry in 1941. In 1946, he was named first dean of graduate studies at the University of Saskatchewan.

== Biography ==
Thorvaldson's family settled in Gimli, Manitoba. Thorvaldson graduated from the University of Manitoba with honours.He also got the Thorvaldson building named after him.

== Awards ==
He was made a Knight ( Riddari ) in the Order of the Falcon ( Hin íslenska fálkaorða ) in 1939.

Henry Marshall Tory Medal was awarded to Thorbergur Thorvaldson, FRSC Professor Emeritus at the University of Saskatchewan in 1951.

== Other honours ==
The official dedication ceremony of the Chemistry Building on the University of Saskatchewan campus was held June 1966 wherein the building was named in honour of Thorbergur Thorvaldson. Thorvaldson was a pioneer researcher in the development of cement that would not deteriorate in alkaline ground water areas.

In 1966, Thorvaldson Lake in northern Saskatchewan was named in his honour.

== See also ==
- Order of the Falcon
- Henry Marshall Tory Medal
