= Finn Hodt =

Norwegian speed skater (1919–2016)

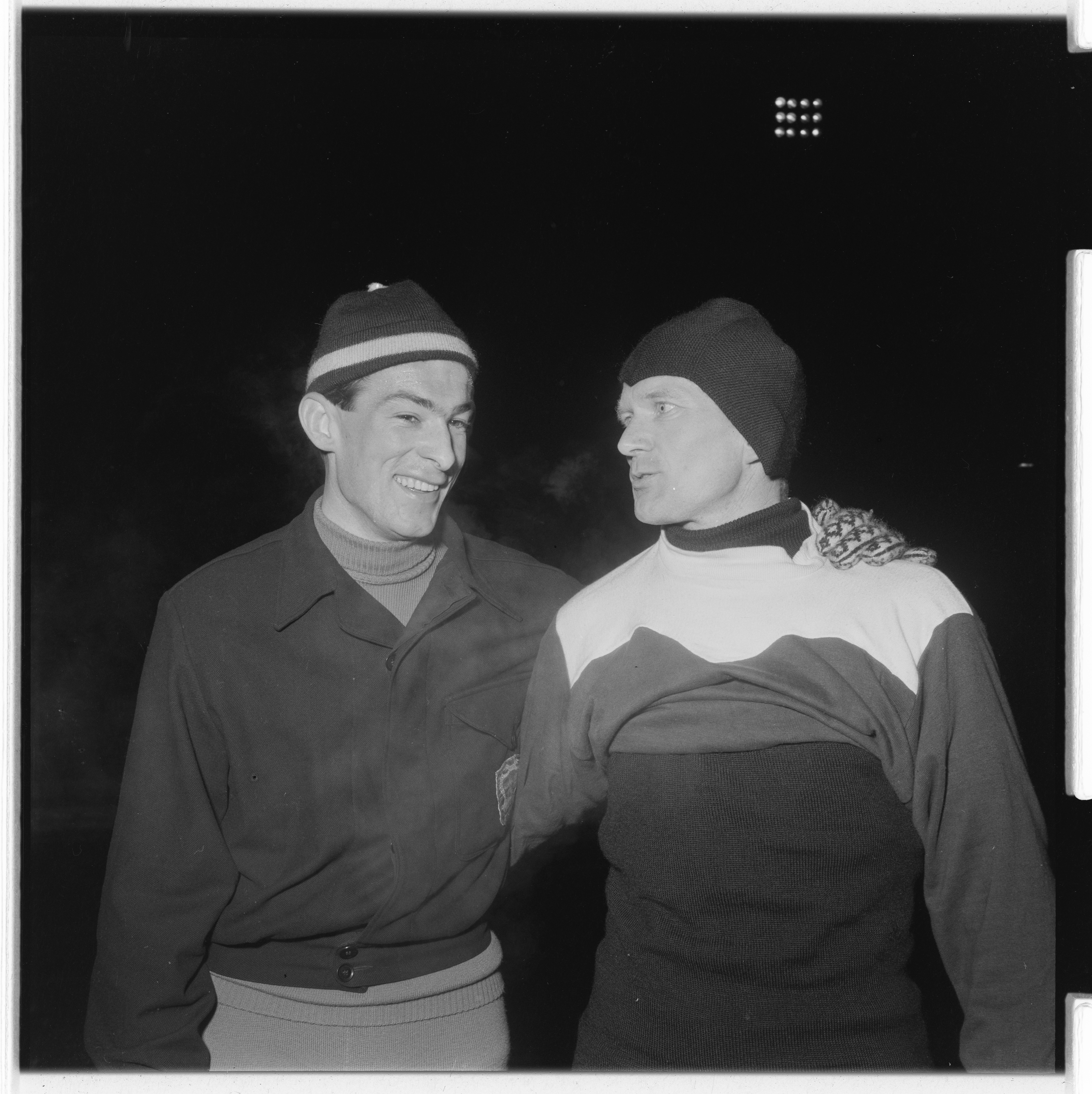
- Finn Hodt and Hroar Elvenes

Personal information
- Nationality: Norwegian
- Born: Finn Einar Hodt; 16 June 1919 Drammen, Norway
- Died: 9 April 2016 (aged 96) Drammen, Norway

Sport
- Country: Norway
- Sport: Speed skating

Finn Einar Hodt (16 June 1919 – 9 April 2016) was a Norwegian speed skater who competed in the 1950s, and later was a speed skating coach.

== Career ==
Hodt was born in Drammen on 16 June 1919, and represented the club Drammens SK. He finished in 13th place in the 500 metres at the 1956 Winter Olympics in Cortina d'Ampezzo. He also won bronze medals at the Norwegian Allround Championship in 1953, 1954 and 1957, and won his favorite distance 500 metres in 1940, 1951, 1953, 1954 and 1957.

Hodt was nominated by the Norwegian Skating Union as a member of the team for the 1952 Winter Olympics in Oslo, but his selection was rejected by the Norwegian Olympic Committee due to his collaboration during the German occupation of Norway in World War II. Along with fellow speed skater Hans Engnestangen, Hodt had been one of the few leading Norwegian athletes not to follow a nationwide boycott of sports events (the "sports strike") during the occupation. The boycott had been launched by the Norwegian sports leadership in response to attempts from 1940 onwards by the collaborationist Quisling regime at nazification of all sports events in Norway.

He was later coach for the Norwegian Skating Association. He was accredited as a coach for the 1964 Winter Olympics and team manager for the 1980 and 1992 Winter Olympics. He then joined the team of speed skater Johann Olav Koss as his team leader, resigning after Koss' immense success at the 1994 Winter Olympics. In 1992 he was awarded the Golden Token, the highest award within the Norwegian Skating Association. He died in 2016, 96 years old.
