= Per Willy Guttormsen =

Norwegian speed skater

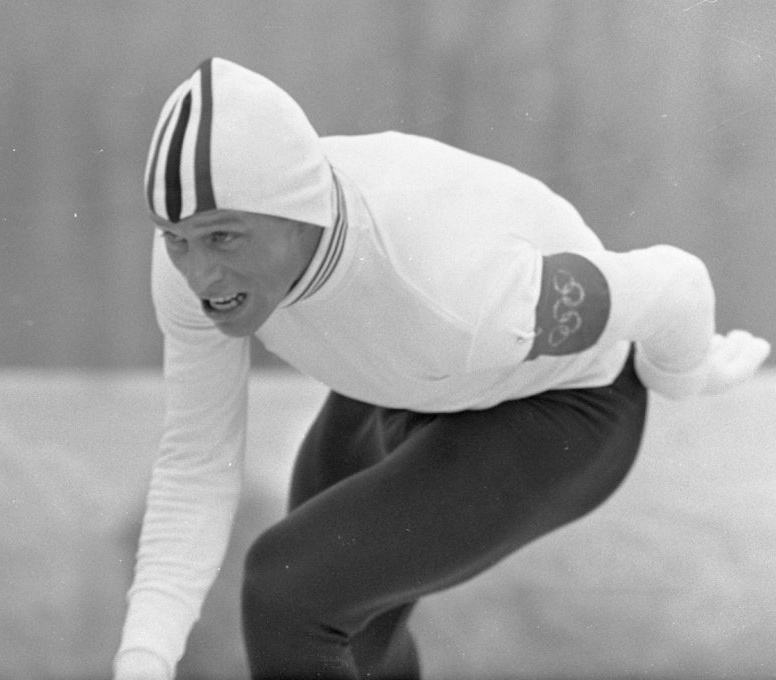
- Per Willy Guttormsen at the 1968 Olympics

Personal information
- Born: 11 June 1942 (age 84) Narvik, Norway
- Height: 1.70 m (5 ft 7 in)
- Weight: 69 kg (152 lb)

Sport
- Sport: Speed skating
- Club: Aktiv SK

Per Willy Guttormsen (born 11 June 1942) is a former Norwegian speed skater and cyclist. He was among the world's best long distance skaters in the 1960s.

Guttormsen's international breakthrough was his 6th place in the 1964 World Speed Skating Championships, at age 21. That year he was just outside the Norwegian three-man quota on the long distances at the 1964 Winter Olympics. He participated however in the 1968 and 1972 Olympics, and in the 1968 Winter Olympics he won 4th places in both the 5000 m and 10000 m.

Guttormsen held three world records in the course of his skating career. These lasted for 12.7 seconds, for about twenty minutes, and for ten and a half months, respectively.

The first of these was set in the allround big combination samalogue pointsum event at Madonna di Campiglio at 13–14 January 1968, where the world record to attack was Kees Verkerk's 178.058, set at Bislett in Oslo 11–12 February 1967. After skating 42.5, 7:28.7, 2:10.4 at the three first distances, it was clear that Guttormsen would break Verkerk's record if he could skate the 10000 m in 15:44.4 or better. Guttormsen managed to achieve this very time of 15:44.4, and thereby broke the samalogue world record by the slimmest of margins (in itself a world record at the time), with a pointsum 178.056. However, his pairmate Svein-Erik Stiansen had skated the three first distances faster than Guttormsen, who lost his first world record when Stiansen crossed the finishing line in 15:57.1, achieving a pointsum of 176.982. Guttormsen's second world record was the 10000 m result 15:25.9, set during the European Championships at Bislett 28 January 1968, breaking Fred Anton Maier's 15:29.5 from Horten a week earlier. However, Maier set the record straight with 15:20.3 in the following pair. Guttormsen's third and most long-lived world record was again on the 10000 m, with 15:16.1, skated in Inzell 10 March 1968. It lasted until Kees Verkerk's legendary 15:03.6 on 26 January 1969.

He skated for Norway in each of the World Speed Skating Championships from 1964 to 1972, apart from 1970, and in these he was ranked 6, 12, 4, 7, 9, 8, 8, 13, respectively. Guttormsen's personal records are 41.2, 1:24.9, 2:04.6, 4:18.9, 7:14.9, 15:13.7. The affectionate and collectively used nickname for Guttormsen was Bettong, as in hard as concrete.

As a cyclist, he participated and finished the 1963 Peace Race.

Guttormsen has been engaged in Sami politics, and has represented the political party Sámit Mátta/Lulli-Norggas.

== World records ==
| Discipline | Time | Date | Location |
|---|---|---|---|
| 10,000 m | 15.16,1 | 10 March 1968 | Inzell |
