= Sonja Ackermann-Olsen =

Norwegian speed skater (1934–2018)

Personal information
- Nationality: Norwegian
- Born: 13 March 1934
- Died: 30 October 2018 (aged 84)

Sport
- Sport: Speed skating

Achievements and titles
- World finals: 4 (1953, 1954, 1955, 1958)

Sonja Ackermann-Olsen (13 March 1934 – 30 October 2018) was a Norwegian speed skater.

Her achievements include two overall victories at the Norwegian Allround Championships, in 1958 and 1959. She participated in the World Allround Speed Skating Championships for Women four times, placing 11th in 1953, and 9th in 1954, 1955 and 1958.

She died in October 2018.
