= Svein-Erik Stiansen =

Norwegian speed skater

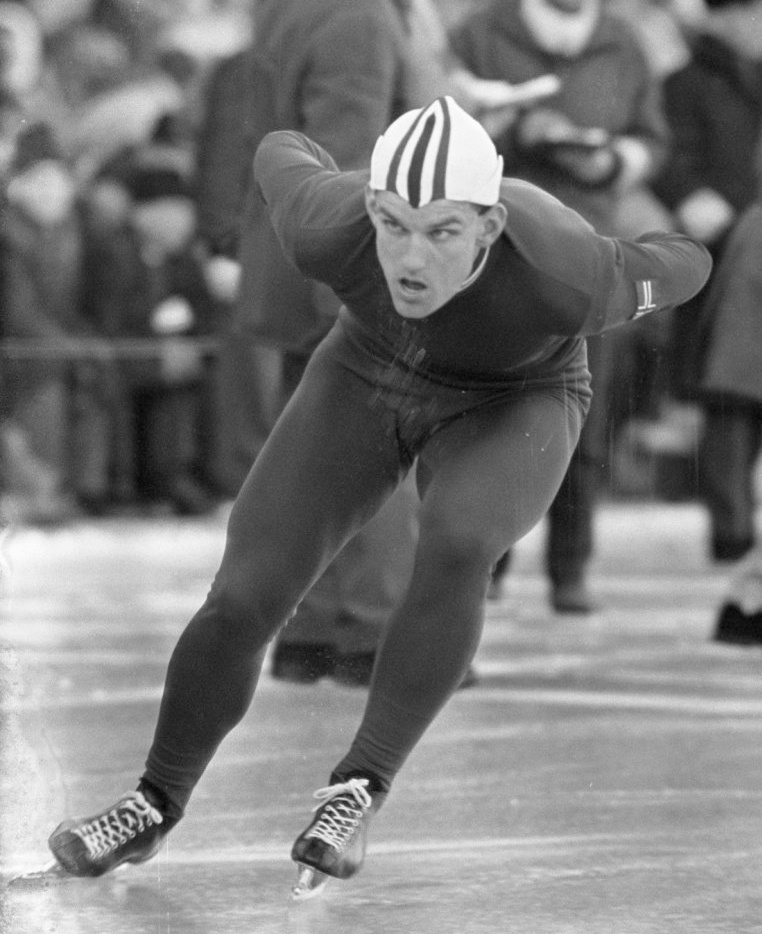
- Svein-Erik Stiansen in 1968

Personal information
- Born: 6 May 1942 (age 84) Oslo, Norway
- Height: 1.80 m (5 ft 11 in)
- Weight: 82 kg (181 lb)

Sport
- Sport: Speed skating
- Club: Oslo Skøiteklub

Svein-Erik Stiansen (born 6 May 1942) is a Norwegian former speed skater.

He participated in the 1968 and 1972 Olympics, and in the 1968 Winter Olympics he finished 7th in the 1500 m and 12th in the 5000 m.

Stiansen set the world record in the all-round samalog event at Madonna di Campiglio at 13–14 January 1968, after skating 41.8, 7:27.6, 2:07.7 and 15:57.1, achieving a sum of 176.982.

He became Norwegian all-round champion in 1966 and in 1967.

Stiansen is the father of Tom Stiansen, world champion in slalom skiing in 1997.
