= Hans Engnestangen =

Norwegian speed skater

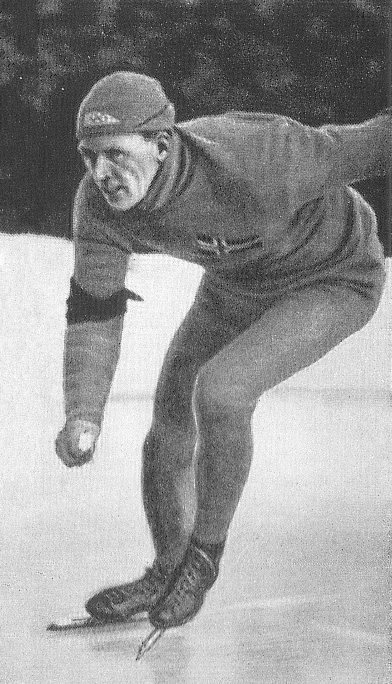

Personal information
- Born: 28 March 1908 Brandbu, Norway
- Died: 9 May 2003 (aged 95) Jevnaker, Norway
- Height: 1.80 m (5 ft 11 in)

Sport
- Sport: Speed skating
- Event: 500–10000 m
- Club: Hamar IL

Achievements and titles
- Personal best(s): 500 m – 41.8 (1938); 1500 m – 2:13.8 (1939); 5000 m – 8:31.3 (1934); 10000 m – 18:06.9 (1933)
Medal record
Representing Norway
World Championships
Gold medal – first place	1933 Trondheim	Allround
Bronze medal – third place	1935 Oslo	Allround
European Championships
Silver medal – second place	1937 Davos	Allround

Hans Engnestangen (28 March 1908 – 9 May 2003) was a Norwegian speed skater and world champion. He held the world records over 500 and 1500 meters for more than 13 years.

== International championships ==
At the 1932 Winter Olympics he participated in the 10000 metres event but was eliminated in the heats. Four years later he finished eights in the 1500 metres competition. He also participated in the 500 metres event but did not finish.

Engnestangen won a gold medal at the 1933 World Allround Championships, and a bronze medal in 1935. He won the 500 m event in 1933, 1938 and 1939, and the 1500 m in 1937 and 1938. He received a silver medal at the 1937 European Allround Championships, where he also won the 500 m race.

== World records ==
In January 1933 Engnestangen broke the Clas Thunberg's world record over 500 m, with 42.5, a record which lasted until 1936. Engnestangen improved the time in January 1937 (42.3), and again in February 1938 (41.8). The last record was unbeaten for 14 years, until 1952.

In January 1939 Engnestangen set a world record over 1500 m at 2:13.8. This record was unbeaten for 13 years.

Discipline	Time	Date	Location
500 m	42.5	21 January 1933	Davos
500 m	42.3	30 January 1937	Davos
500 m	41.8	5 February 1938	Davos
1500 m	2:13.8	29 January 1939	Davos

Source: SpeedSkatingStats.com

== World War II ==
Along with fellow speed skater Finn Hodt, Engnestangen had been one of the few leading Norwegian athletes not to follow a nationwide boycott of sports events (the "sports strike") during the occupation. In particular, in 1942 he skated in a Norway-Germany meet in Klagenfurt in Austria. The boycott had been launched by the Norwegian sports leadership in response to attempts from 1940 onwards by the collaborationist Quisling regime at nazification of all sports events in Norway. After the war Engnestangen was sentenced to two years for collaborating with the Nazi Germany, though contrary to other involved sportsmen he had no personal connection to Nazis.

Records
Preceded by (Finland) Clas Thunberg	Men's 500 m World Record Holder; 21 January 1933 – 18 January 1936	Succeeded by (United States) Allan Potts
Preceded by (United States) Allan Potts	Men's 500 m World Record Holder; 30 January 1937 – 6 January 1952	Succeeded by (Soviet Union) Yury Sergeev
Preceded by (Norway) Michael Staksrud	Men's 1500 m World Record Holder; 29 January 1939 – 20 January 1952	Succeeded by (Soviet Union) Valentin Chaikin
