= Minna Nystedt =

Norwegian speed skater

Minna Rosita Nystedt (born 11 October 1967) is a Norwegian speed skater, born in Levanger Municipality. She competed at the 1988 Winter Olympics in Calgary, Canada.

She won four Norwegian single distance championships, and placed second in the all-round national championships in 1987, 1988, 1990 and 1992.
