= Laila Schou Nilsen =

Norwegian speed skater, alpine skier, and tennis player (1919–1998)

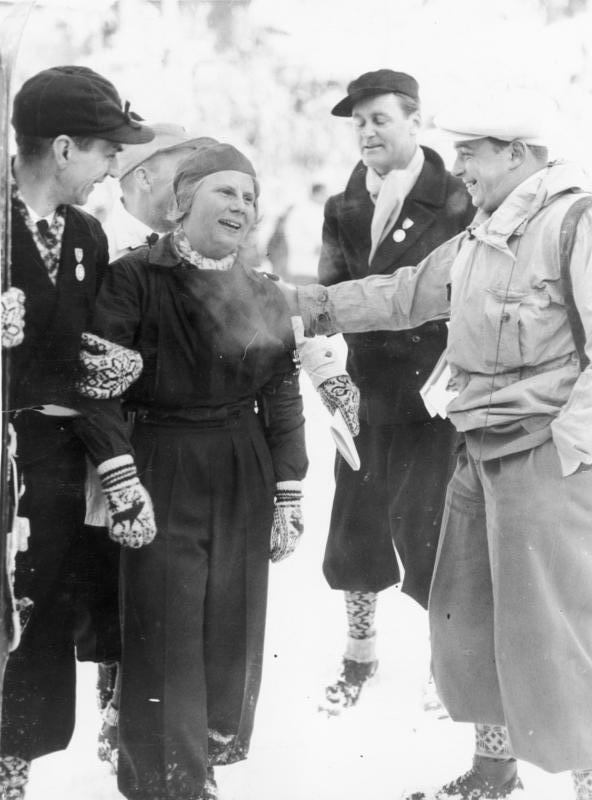
- Nilsen after the downhill event at the 1936 Olympics.

Personal information
- Nationality: Norwegian
- Born: 18 March 1919 Vestre Aker, Kristiania
- Died: 30 July 1998 (aged 79) Oslo, Norway
- Years active: 1931–c. 1965

Sport
- Country: Norway
- Sport: Alpine skiing; Speed skating; Tennis; Handball; Motorsport
- Club: Alpine skiing and handball; Grefsen Idrettslag; Speed skating; Oslo Skøiteklub; Tennis; Grefsen Tennisklubb; Oslo Tennisklub; SK Njård
Medal record
Representing Norway
Women's alpine skiing
Olympic Games
Bronze medal – third place	1936 Garmisch-Partenkirchen	Combined
Women's speed skating
World Championship
Gold medal – first place	1935 Oslo
Gold medal – first place	1937 Davos
Gold medal – first place	1938 Oslo

Laila Schou Nilsen (18 March 1919 – 30 July 1998) was one of the foremost Norwegian sportspeople of the 20th century, best known as a speed skater, alpine skier, and tennis player. She was one of the pioneers in women's speed skating, both in Norway and internationally, along with two other skaters from the Oslo Skøiteklub ('Oslo Skating Club'), Undis Blikken and Synnøve Lie. Across her sporting career – which also included handball, ski jumping, cross-country skiing, and motorsport – Nilsen won 101 Norwegian Championship titles, of which 86 were in tennis.

== Speed skating ==
Nilsen won the last of a series of three unofficial World Championships in speed skating for women that were organised by the Oslo Skøiteklub at Oslo Frogner stadion in 1935, two weeks before her sixteenth birthday. At the 1937 edition of the World Allround Speed Skating Championships for Women at the Eisstadion Davos in Davos, Switzerland, she set records in all four distances (500 m, 1,000 m, 3,000 m, and 5,000 m). She also won the 1938 World Championships in Oslo. Her 500 m record of 46.6 seconds held until 1955, when Tamara Rylova of the Soviet Union beat it at the Medeo track in Alma Ata. Her record for the 1,500 m was not bested until 1950.

Nilsen was the Norwegian Allround Champion in speed skating in 1935, 1937, 1939, and 1940.

=== Medals ===
An overview of speed skating medals won by Laila Schou Nilsen at elite championships, listed with the years won.

Championship	1st place, gold medalist(s)	2nd place, silver medalist(s)	3rd place, bronze medalist(s)
World Allround	1935*; 1937; 1938	–	–
Norwegian Allround	1935; 1937; 1939; 1940	1934; 1938; 1939	–

*The World Allround Championships were unofficial from 1933 to 1935.

=== Personal records ===
To put these personal records in perspective, the WR column lists the official world records on the dates that Laila Schou Nilsen skated her personal records.

Event	Result	Date	Venue	WR
500 m	46.4	30 January 1937	Eisstadion Davos, Davos	49.3
1,000 m	1:38.8	31 January 1937	Eisstadion Davos, Davos	1:42.3
1,500 m	2:38.1	23 January 1937	Frogner stadion, Oslo	2:40.0
3,000 m	5:29.6	30 January 1937	Eisstadion Davos, Davos	6:12.0
5,000 m	9:28.3	31 January 1937	Eisstadion Davos, Davos	10:15.3
Old combination	207.563	31 January 1937	Eisstadion Davos, Davos	none

== Alpine skiing ==
As speed skating for women was not included in the Olympic program for the 1936 Winter Olympics, 16 year old Nilsen sought out other sports in which she could compete at the Olympics. She settled on alpine skiing, a sport in which she'd earned good results at the national level but not internationally. After just a month of intensive training in the lead-up to the Olympics, she won the downhill race and claimed Olympic bronze in the alpine combined. No medals were awarded in sub-disciplines at the 1936 Olympic Games, so her gold medal-worthy downhill finish did not result in the honour it would have had it come at a later Olympics.

After the World War II, Nilsen competed in alpine skiing at the 1948 Winter Olympics in St. Moritz, where she finished 7th in downhill and 14th in slalom.

== Other ==
Nilsen was awarded the Egebergs Ærespris in 1936 for "outstanding achievements in alpine skiing and speed skating and excellent achievements in tennis."

Nilsen was also a member of the Norwegian women's national handball team and participated in the Monte Carlo Rally in 1963.

Sporting positions
Preceded by Øyvind Mørch Smith	President of the Norwegian Handball Federation; 1962–1966	Succeeded by Odd Svartberg
Awards
Preceded by Bjarne Bryntesen	Egebergs Ærespris; 1936	Succeeded by Johan Haanes
