= Michael Staksrud =

Norwegian speed skater (1908–1940)

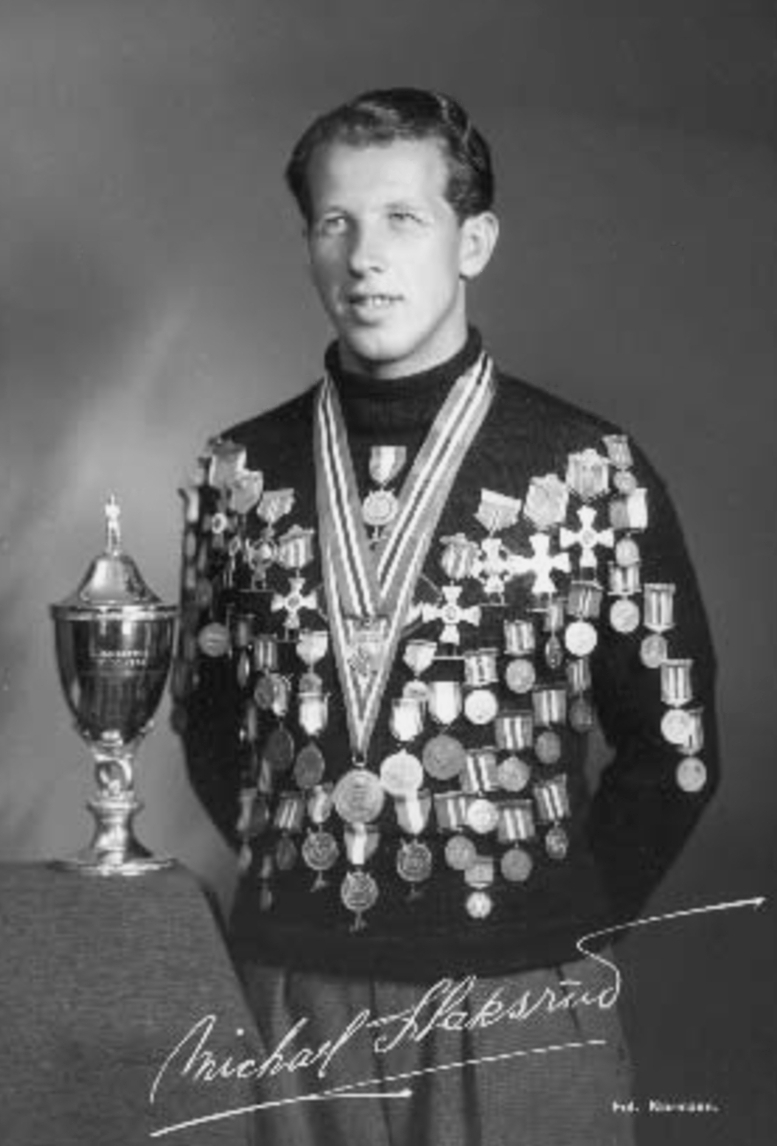

Personal information
- Born: 2 June 1908 Tingelstad, Norway
- Died: 10 November 1940 (aged 32) Gjersjøen, Norway
- Height: 178 cm (5 ft 10 in)

Sport
- Sport: Speed skating

Achievements and titles
- Personal bests: 500 m – 42.8 (1937); 1500 m – 2:14.4 (1939); 5000 m – 8:19.9 (1933); 10,000 m – 17:23.2 (1928)
Medal record
Representing Norway
World championships
Bronze medal – third place	1929 Oslo	Allround
Gold medal – first place	1930 Oslo	Allround
Silver medal – second place	1932 Lake Placid	Allround
Silver medal – second place	1933 Trondheim	Allround
Gold medal – first place	1935 Oslo	Allround
Gold medal – first place	1937 Oslo	Allround
European championships
Silver medal – second place	1930 Nidaros	Allround
Gold medal – first place	1934 Hamar	Allround
Gold medal – first place	1937 Davos	Allround

Michael Staksrud (2 June 1908 – 10 November 1940) was a Norwegian World Champion in speed skating.

== Life and sports career ==
Born in Gran Municipality, in the district of Hadeland, Staksrud started his speed skating career at Hamar Idrettslag (Hamar Sports Club). From 1937 onward, he represented Oslo Skøiteklub (Oslo Skating Club). Together with Ivar Ballangrud and Hans Engnestangen, he formed the famous Hadeland Trio, three Norwegians who dominated both Norwegian and international speed skating in the 1930s. Seven of the nine World Allround Championships between 1930 and 1938, and six of the nine European Allround Championships between 1929 and 1937 were won by a member of this Hadeland Trio, with Staksrud himself winning three World titles and two European titles.

Another illustration of the domination of the Hadeland Trio was the 1,500 m event at a tournament in Davos on 29 January 1939. Staksrud entered that tournament as the world record holder on that distance with a time of 2:14.9. He was paired with Ballangrud and skated 2:14.4, faster than his world record time, but Ballangrud had finished 0.4 seconds earlier in a time of 2:14.0. However, neither of them became the new world record holder, because Engnestangen skated 2:13.8 in his race.

Although Staksrud participated in several events at the Winter Olympic Games of 1928, 1932, and 1936, he never won any Olympic medals. In 1940, Staksrud drowned at the age of 32. Some of his family members were helping the Germans, and it was speculated that Staksrud was killed, but apparently it was an accident – he fell into Gjersjøen lake, hit a stone with his head, lost consciousness and drowned. However, his elder brother Paul, who was also a speed skater and died in the 1940s, was probably shot by the Norwegian resistance.

== World records ==
Over the course of his career, Staksrud skated two world records:

Discipline	Time	Date	Location
3000 m	4.59,1	25 February 1933	Hamar
1500 m	2.14,9	31 January 1937	Davos

Source: SpeedSkatingStats.com

== Personal records ==
To put these personal records in perspective, the WR column lists the official world records on the dates that Staksrud skated his personal records.

Event	Result	Date	Venue	WR
500 m	42.8	30 January 1937	Davos	42.4
1,000 m	1:32.3	3 February 1929	Hamar	1:31.8
1,500 m	2:14.4	29 January 1939	Davos	2:14.9
3,000 m	4:55.2	30 January 1937	Davos	4:49.6
5,000 m	8:19.9	4 February 1933	Hamar	8:19.2
10,000 m	17:23.2	5 February 1928	Davos	17:22.6

Note that Staksrud's personal record on the 1,500 m was not a world record because Hans Engnestangen skated 2:13.8 at the same tournament.

Staksrud has an Adelskalender score of 189.750 points. His highest ranking on the Adelskalender was a first place, which he held for a total of 728 days between 1937 and 1939.
