= Randi Thorvaldsen =

Norwegian speed skater

Personal information
- Born: 4 March 1925 Fiskum, Norway
- Died: 10 February 2011 (aged 85)

Sport
- Country: Norway
- Sport: Speed skating
Medal record
Representing Norway
Women's speed skating
World Championships
Silver medal – second place	1951 Eskilstuna	Allround
Bronze medal – third place	1952 Kokkola	Allround

Randi Thorvaldsen (4 March 1925, in Øvre Eiker – 10 February 2011) was a Norwegian speedskater, silver medalist from the allround World Championship, and a previous World Record holder in 1,500 metres. She was the dominating female speedskater in Norway from the end of the Second World War to 1954. She was born in Fiskum, Øvre Eiker, and represented the club IF Liv, Hønefoss.

== National merits ==
Thorvaldsen won the first national all-round speed skating championship held in Norway after World War II, in 1946. She became Norwegian all-round champion nine years in a row, every year from 1946 to 1954. In these championships she won 34 distances, out of 36 possible. She set ten national records during her career. Her national record on 5,000 m from 1953, 9:35.6, was unbeaten for 29 years, until 1982.

== World championships ==
Thorvaldsen participated in eight World Championships. She placed fourth in 1948, and again fourth in 1949, and ninth in 1950. She won a silver medal at the World Allround Speed Skating Championships for Women in 1951 in Eskilstuna, behind Eevi Huttunen. At the 1951 championship she won the 500 m distance with the time 49.4, placed second at 1,000 m (1:42.6), second on 3,000 m (5:56.0) and second on 5,000 m (9:54.8), resulting in the samalog (total score) 219.513. At the World Championships in 1952 in Kokkola she won the bronze medal, after placing second on 500 m and 1,500 m, fifth on 3,000 m and sixth on 5,000 m. At the 1953 World Championships she finished sixth, and again sixth in 1954.

== Records ==
Thorvaldsen set a world record in women's 1500 m in Gjøvik in 1950, when she improved Laila Schou Nilsen's previous record from 1937. Her new record, 2:37.5, lasted less than one month, when it was beaten by Rimma Zhukova.

World records
Distance	Result	Date	Location
1,500 m	2:37.5	25 February 1950	Gjøvik

Norwegian records
Distance	Result	Date	Location
3,000 m	5:38.7	7 March 1948	Rjukan
3,000 m	5:38.0	12 February 1949	Kongsberg
1,500 m	2:37.5	25 February 1950	Gjøvik
3,000 m	5:34.1	26 February 1950	Gjøvik
Mini combination	207.883	25 February 1950	Gjøvik
1500 m	2:32.4	2 February 1952	Trondheim
1,000 m	1:39.7	3 February 1952	Trondheim
3,000 m	5:33.8	3 February 1952	Trondheim
Mini combination	204.283	3 February 1952	Trondheim
5,000 m	9:35.6	22 February 1953	Lillehammer

Personal records
Distance	Result	Date	Location
500 m	48.0	2 February 1952	Trondheim
1,000 m	1:39.7	3 February 1952	Trondheim
1,500 m	2:32.4	2 February 1952	Trondheim
3,000 m	5:33.8	3 February 1952	Trondheim
5,000 m	9:35.6	22 February 1953	Lillehammer
Mini combination	204.283	3 February 1952	Trondheim

Records
Preceded by (Norway) Laila Schou Nilsen 2:38.1	Women's 1500 m world record holder 25 February 1950 – 17 March 1950	Succeeded by (Soviet Union) Rimma Zhukova 2:36.7
