= World Allround Speed Skating Championships =

Championship

The World Allround Speed Skating Championships are a series of speed skating events held annually to determine the best allround speed skater of the world. The event is held over two days, with all skaters entering the first three distances (500 m, 3000 m and 1500 m for women; 500 m, 5000 m and 1500 m for men) and the best eight skaters over these distances getting to ride the last event (5000 m for women; 10 000 m for men). The results of the races are converted to points, and the skater with lowest total score wins the championship.

The International Skating Union has organised the World Allround Championships for Men since 1893 (with unofficial Championships being held in the years 1889–1892) and the World Allround Championships for Women since 1936 (unofficial Championships were held in the years 1933–1935). Since 1996 the men's and women's World Allround Championships are held at the same time and venue. Since 2020, the men's and women's World Allround Championships are held every even year – at same time and venue as the men's and women's World Sprint Championships.

== Overview ==
Speed skating Distances
Men	Women
500 m
1,500 m
5,000 m	3,000 m
Top 8 skaters (Men / Women)
10,000 m	5,000 m

== History and medal winners ==
=== Combined all-time medal count ===
Rank	Nation	Gold	Silver	Bronze	Total
1	Netherlands	57	33	52	142
2	Norway	43	41	43	127
3	Soviet Union	32	38	30	100
4	Finland	12	14	5	31
5	Germany	12	12	6	30
6	United States	11	6	12	29
7	East Germany	10	9	6	25
8	Czech Republic	5	3	1	9
9	Canada	4	6	5	15
10	Sweden	4	4	6	14
11	Russia	3	6	3	12
12	Austria	2	3	2	7
13	Japan	1	5	7	13
14	Italy	1	3	3	7
15	Latvia	1	1	0	2
16	Hungary	1	0	0	1
17	France	0	1	0	1
17	Great Britain	0	1	0	1
17	Kazakhstan	0	1	0	1
17	North Korea	0	1	0	1
21	Belgium	0	0	3	3
22	Poland	0	0	2	2
23	Romania	0	0	1	1
–	Independent^{[a]}	0	0	1	1
Totals (23 entries)		199	188	188	575

- ^[a] Kornél Pajor skated for Hungary until he defected in 1949. From then on, the ISU allowed him to participate as an independent skater representing the ISU, as he did winning the bronze medal in 1951.
- From 1889 to 1907 only gold medals were awarded: to win the gold medal, an athlete was required to win at least three of the distances. In seven competitions, no winner was declared due to this rule.
- Unofficial World Championships (not recognized by the ISU) included

== Repeat winners ==
Rank	Skater	Year	1st place, gold medalist(s)	2nd place, silver medalist(s)	3rd place, bronze medalist(s)	Total
1	(Netherlands) Sven Kramer	2007, 2008, 2009, 2010, 2012, 2013, 2015, 2016, 2017	9	0	3	12
2	(East Germany) / (Germany) Gunda Niemann-Stirnemann (Kleemann)	1991, 1992, 1993, 1995, 1996, 1997, 1998, 1999	8	2	0	10
3	(Netherlands) Ireen Wüst	2007, 2011, 2012, 2013, 2014, 2017, 2020	7	4	2	13
4	(Czech Republic) Martina Sáblíková	2009, 2010, 2015, 2016, 2019	5	2	1	8
5	(East Germany) Karin Kania (Enke, Busch)	1982, 1984, 1986, 1987, 1988	5	2	0	7
6	(Finland) Clas Thunberg	1923, 1925, 1928, 1929, 1931	5	1	1	7
7	(Norway) Oscar Mathisen	1908, 1909, 1912, 1913, 1914	5	1	0	6
8	(Norway) Ivar Ballangrud	1926, 1932, 1936, 1938	4	4	3	11
9	(Netherlands) Rintje Ritsma	1995, 1996, 1999, 2001	4	2	3	9
10	(Soviet Union) Inga Voronina (Artamonova)	1957, 1958, 1962, 1965	4	2	0	6
11	(Netherlands) Atje Keulen-Deelstra	1970, 1972, 1973, 1974	4	0	0	4
12	(Netherlands) Patrick Roest	2018, 2019, 2020	3	3	0	6
13	(Netherlands) Ard Schenk	1970, 1971, 1972	3	2	2	7
14	(Norway) Michael Staksrud	1930, 1935, 1937	3	2	1	6
14	(Soviet Union) Valentina Stenina	1960, 1961, 1966	3	2	1	6
16	(Soviet Union) Oleg Goncharenko	1953, 1956, 1958	3	2	0	5
17	(Norway) Johann Olav Koss	1990, 1991, 1994	3	1	1	5
17	(Germany) Anni Friesinger	2001, 2002, 2005	3	1	1	5
19	(United States) Eric Heiden	1977, 1978, 1979	3	1	0	4
20	(Netherlands) Jaap Eden	1893, 1895, 1896	3	0	0	3
20	(Norway) Laila Schou Nilsen	1935 *, 1937, 1938	3	0	0	3
20	(Soviet Union) Maria Isakova	1948, 1949, 1950	3	0	0	3
20	(Norway) Hjalmar Andersen	1950, 1951, 1952	3	0	0	3
24	(Netherlands) Stien Kaiser	1967, 1968	2	4	2	8
25	(Netherlands) Ids Postma	1997, 1998	2	4	1	7
26	(East Germany) Andrea Ehrig (Schöne)	1983, 1985	2	4	0	6
27	(Finland) Verné Lesche	1939, 1947	2	3	1	6
28	(Canada) Cindy Klassen	2003, 2006	2	2	1	5
29	(Norway) Bernt Evensen	1927, 1934	2	1	3	6
29	(Soviet Union) Lidiya Skoblikova	1963, 1964	2	1	3	6
31	(Soviet Union) Lidia Selikhova	1952, 1954	2	1	2	5
32	(Norway) Odd Lundberg	1946 *, 1948	2	1	1	4
32	(Soviet Union) Natalya Petrusyova	1980, 1981	2	1	1	4
32	(United States) Shani Davis	2005, 2006	2	1	1	4
35	(Norway) Knut Johannesen	1957, 1964	2	1	0	3
36	(Netherlands) Kees Verkerk	1966, 1967	2	0	3	5
37	(Netherlands) Hilbert van der Duim	1980, 1982	2	0	2	4
38	(Norway) Peder Østlund	1898, 1899	2	0	0	2
38	(Russia) Nikolay Strunnikov	1910, 1911	2	0	0	2
38	(Netherlands) Hein Vergeer	1985, 1986	2	0	0	2
38	(Netherlands) Gianni Romme	2000, 2003	2	0	0	2

* unofficial World Championships

Source: SpeedSkatingStats.com

== See also ==
- World Sprint Speed Skating Championships
- Speed skating at the Winter Olympics
- European Speed Skating Championships
