= 1973 Women's World Allround Speed Skating Championships =

International speed skating competition

- Venue: Strömsvallen, Strömsund, Sweden
- Dates: 24–25 February
- Competitors: 26 skaters from 11 countries

Medalist women
1st place, gold medalist(s)		Atje Keulen-Deelstra	NED
2nd place, silver medalist(s)		Tatyana Shelekhova	URS
3rd place, bronze medalist(s)		Trijnie Rep	NED

The 34th edition of the World Allround Speed Skating Championships for Women took place on 24 and 25 February in Strömsund at the Strömsvallen Strömsund ice rink.

Title holder was the Netherlander Atje Keulen-Deelstra.

== Distance medalists ==
Event	Gold (gold)	Silver (silver)	Bronze (bronze)
500m	Sheila Young	Sylvia Burka	Atje Keulen-Deelstra
1500m	Galina Stepanskaya	Sippie Tigchelaar	Atje Keulen-Deelstra
1000m	Atje Keulen-Deelstra	Monika Pflug	Tatyana Shelekhova
3000m	Sippie Tigchelaar	Atje Keulen-Deelstra	Nina Statkevich

== Classification ==
Rank	Skater	Country	Points Samalog	500m	1500m	1000m	3000m
1st place, gold medalist(s)	Atje Keulen-Deelstra	Netherlands	185.950	45.03 (3)	2:21.37 (3)	1:30.41 (gold)	4:51.55 (2)
2nd place, silver medalist(s)	Tatyana Shelekhova	Soviet Union	188.363	45.41 (8)	2:21.91 (5)	1:31.68 (3)	4:58.86 (4)
3rd place, bronze medalist(s)	Trijnie Rep	Netherlands	188.651	45.26 (5)	2:22.12 (7)	1:32.24 (5)	4:59.39 (5)
4	Nina Statkevich	Soviet Union	188.685	46.21 (13)	2:22.04 (6)	1:31.76 (4)	4:55.49 (3)
5	Sippie Tigchelaar	Netherlands	189.164	47.67 (24)	2:21.23 (2)	1:32.08 (6)	4:50.26 (gold)
6	Monika Pflug	West Germany	189.804	45.28 (6)	2:21.74 (4)	1:30.69 (2)	5:11.59 (14)
7	Galina Stepanskaya	Soviet Union	190.240	46.33 (15)	2:20.88 (gold)	1:33.41 (12)	5:01.47 (6)
8	Ellie van den Brom	Netherlands	191.543	46.10 (11)	2:22.98 (8)	1:32.76 (9)	5:08.42 (10)
9	Lisbeth Berg	Norway	191.600	45.98 (10)	2:23.79 (9)	1:33.86 (15)	5:04.56 (8)
10	Lāsma Kauniste	Soviet Union	191.991	46.34 (16)	2:25.36 (13)	1.32.66 (8)	5:05.21 (9)
11	Sheila Young	United States	192.220	43.56 (gold)	2:26.21 (14)	1:33.26 (11)	5:19.76 (16)
12	Sylvia Burka	Canada	193.080	44.71 (2)	2:25.35 (12)	1:33.44 (13)	5:19.20 (15)
13	Sijtje van der Lende	Netherlands	193.379	47.60 (23)	2:25.22 (11)	1:34.19 (16)	5:01.66 (7)
14	Lyudmila Savrulina	Soviet Union	193.390	46.14 (12)	2:24.25 (10)	1:34.55 (18)	5:11.35 (13)
15	Satomi Koike	Japan	194.357	47.31 (20)	2:26.58 (15)	1:33.53 (14)	5:08.53 (11)
16	Sylvia Filipsson	Sweden	195.114	46.75 (17)	2:26.96 (16)	1:35.24 (20)	5:10.54 (12)
NC17	Ann-Sofie Järnström	Sweden	140.667	45.18 (4)	2:27.23 (17)	1:32.82 (10)	–
NC18	Leah Poulos	United States	141.177	45.39 (7)	2:29.45 (19)	1:31.94 (5)	–
NC19	Kaname Ide	Japan	143.208	45.82 (9)	2:29.86 (20)	1:34.87 (19)	–
NC20	Erwina Ryś	Poland	144.083	46.76 (18)	2:27.31 (18)	1:36.44 (21)	–
NC21	Gayle Gordon	Canada	146.475	46.91 (19)	2:30.81 (21)	1:38.59 (25)	–
NC22	Connie Carpenter	United States	146.493	47.36 (21)	2:32.53 (25)	1:36.58 (22)	–
NC23	Wang Xiuyou	China	147.170	47.48 (22)	2:32.13 (24)	1:37.96 (24)	–
NC24	Marja Repola	Finland	147.303	47.95 (25)	2:31.27 (23)	1:37.86 (23)	–
NC25	Sigrid Sundby	Norway	147.538	46.21 (13)	2:42.52 * (26)	1:34.31 (17)	–
NC26	Jiang Youfeng	China	149.265	48.93 (26)	2:31.23 (22)	1:39.85 (26)	–

* = Fall

== Attribution ==
In Dutch
