= World record progression 3000 m speed skating women =

The world record progression 3000 m speed skating women as recognised by the International Skating Union:

Name	Result	Date	Venue
(Poland) Zofia Nehringowa	6:52.8	8 February 1931	Warsaw
(Poland) Zofia Nehringowa	6:22.4	9 February 1935	Warsaw
(United States) Kit Klein	6:12.0	1 February 1936	Stockholm
(Norway) Laila Schou Nilsen	5:29.6	30 January 1937	Davos
(Soviet Union) Zoya Kholshevnikova	5:29.1	30 January 1949	Moscow
(Soviet Union) Tatyana Karelina	5:26.7	11 February 1951	Medeo
(Soviet Union) Olga Akifyeva	5:22.2	16 February 1951	Medeo
(Soviet Union) Rimma Zhukova	5:21.3	8 January 1952	Medeo
(Soviet Union) Rimma Zhukova	5:13.8	23 January 1953	Medeo
(Soviet Union) Inga Artamonova	5:06.0	28 January 1962	Medeo
(Soviet Union) Lidia Skoblikova	5:05.9	15 January 1967	Oslo
(Netherlands) Stien Kaiser	5:04.8	29 January 1967	Davos
(Netherlands) Stien Kaiser	4:56.8	5 March 1967	Inzell
(Netherlands) Stien Kaiser	4:54.6	3 February 1968	Davos
(Netherlands) Ans Schut	4:52.0	2 February 1969	Grenoble
(Netherlands) Ans Schut	4:50.4	9 February 1969	Davos
(Netherlands) Ans Schut	4:50.3	23 February 1969	Inzell
(Netherlands) Stien Kaiser	4:46.5	16 January 1971	Davos
(Soviet Union) Tamara Kuznetsova	4:44.69	12 January 1975	Medeo
(United States) Nancy Swider	4:40.85	13 March 1976	Inzell
(Soviet Union) Galina Stepanskaya	4:40.59	16 March 1976	Medeo
(Soviet Union) Galina Stepanskaya	4:31.00	23 March 1976	Medeo
(East Germany) Gabi Schönbrunn	4:21.70	28 March 1981	Medeo
(East Germany) Andrea Schöne	4:20.91	23 March 1984	Medeo
(East Germany) Karin Kania	4:18.02	21 March 1986	Medeo
(Netherlands) Yvonne van Gennip	4:16.85	19 March 1987	Heerenveen
(East Germany) Gabi Zange	4:16.76	5 December 1987	Calgary
(Netherlands) Yvonne van Gennip	4:11.94	23 February 1988	Calgary
(East Germany) Gunda Kleemann	4:10.80	9 December 1990	Calgary
(Germany) Gunda Niemann	4:09.32	25 March 1994	Calgary
(Germany) Gunda Niemann-Stirnemann	4:07.80	7 December 1997	Heerenveen
(Germany) Claudia Pechstein	4:07.13	13 December 1997	Hamar
(Germany) Gunda Niemann-Stirnemann	4:05.08	14 March 1998	Heerenveen
(Germany) Gunda Niemann-Stirnemann	4:01.67	27 March 1998	Calgary
(Germany) Gunda Niemann-Stirnemann	4:00.51	30 January 2000	Calgary
(Germany) Gunda Niemann-Stirnemann	4:00.26	17 February 2001	Hamar
(Germany) Claudia Pechstein	3:59.27	2 March 2001	Calgary
(Germany) Claudia Pechstein	3:57.70	10 February 2002	Salt Lake City
(Canada) Cindy Klassen	3:55.75	12 November 2005	Calgary
(Canada) Cindy Klassen	3:53.34	18 March 2006	Calgary
(Czech Republic) Martina Sáblíková	3:53.31	2 March 2019	Calgary
(Czech Republic) Martina Sáblíková	3:52.02	9 March 2019	Salt Lake City
