= 1978 World Allround Speed Skating Championships for women =

International speed skating competition

1978 World Allround Speed Skating Championships for Women
- Venue: Oulunkylä Ice Rink, Helsinki, Finland
- Dates: 4–5 March
- Competitors: 31 skaters

Medalist women
1st place, gold medalist(s)		Tatyana Averina	SOV
2nd place, silver medalist(s)		Galina Stepanskaya	SOV
3rd place, bronze medalist(s)		Marion Dittmann	DDR

The 39th edition of the World Allround Speed Skating Championships 1978 took place on 4 and 5 March in Helsinki, at the Oulunkylä Ice Rink.

Title holder was Vera Bryndzei from the Soviet Union.

== Distance medalists ==
Event	Gold (gold)	Silver (silver)	Bronze (bronze)
500m	Valentina Lalenkova	Tatyana Averina	Erwina Ryś-Ferens
1500m	Tatyana Averina	Galina Stepanskaya	Sylvia Filipsson
1000m	Tatyana Averina	Kim Kostron	Sylvia Burka
3000m	Marion Dittmann	Galina Stepanskaya	Bjørg Eva Jensen

== Classification ==
Rank	Skater	Country	Points Samalog	500m	1500m	1000m	3000m
1st place, gold medalist(s)	Tatyana Averina	Soviet Union	186.891	45.20 (2)	2:21.44 (gold)	1:29.56 (gold)	4:58.59 (5)
2nd place, silver medalist(s)	Galina Stepanskaya	Soviet Union	187.218	45.45 (5)	2:22.42 (2)	1:30.50 (6)	4:54.27 (2)
3rd place, bronze medalist(s)	Marion Dittmann	East Germany	187.760	45.90 (12)	2:22.95 (5)	1:30.34 (4)	4:54.24 (gold)
4	Bjørg Eva Jensen	Norway	188.381	45.82 (10)	2:24.20 (9)	1:30.66 (7)	4:54.99 (3)
5	Valentina Lalenkova	Soviet Union	188.546	44.91 (gold)	2:24.41 (11)	1:30.34 (4)	5:01.98 (9)
6	Sylvia Burka	Canada	189.254	45.63 (6)	2:23.41 (6)	1:30.25 (3)	5:04.18 (12)
7	Sylvia Filipsson	Sweden	189.541	45.41 (4)	2:22.81 (3)	1:32.12 (20)	5:02.81 (10)
8	Lisbeth Korsmo-Berg	Norway	190.067	46.48 (22)	2:23.87 (7)	1:31.48 (12)	4:59.35 (6)
9	Kim Kostron	United States	190.098	45.67 (7)	2:24.69 (12)	1:29.99 (2)	5:07.22 (15)
10	Beth Heiden	United States	190.144	45.75 (9)	2:25.03 (14)	1:31.86 (17)	5:00.73 (8)
11	Nancy Swider	United States	190.333	46.82 (25)	2:24.25 (10)	1:31.86 (17)	4:57.00 (4)
12	Sijtje van der Lende	Netherlands	190.458	47.05 (26)	2:22.87 (4)	1:31.51 (13)	5:00.18 (7)
13	Sophie Westenbroek	Netherlands	190.518	45.99 (14)	2:25.50 (15)	1:31.04 (9)	5:03.05 (11)
14	Vera Bryndzei	Soviet Union	190.566	45.88 (11)	2:24.80 (13)	1:31.02 (8)	5:05.46 (13)
15	Anna Lenner	Sweden	191.094	46.27 (18)	2:24.13 (8)	1:31.33 (11)	5:06.70 (14)
16	Kathy Vogt	Canada	193.539	46.02 (15)	2:25.97 (16)	1:31.11 (10)	5:19.85 (16)
NC17	Erwina Ryś-Ferens	Poland	139.818	45.37 (3)	2:26.05 (17)	1:31.53 (14)	–
NC18	Ina Steenbruggen	Netherlands	140.530	45.72 (8)	2:26.31 (19)	1:32.08 (19)	–
NC19	Joke van Rijssel	Netherlands	141.016	46.39 (20)	2:26.21 (18)	1:31.78 (16)	–
NC20	Cindy Seikkula	United States	141.088	46.15 (17)	2:27.19 (22)	1:31.75 (15)	–
NC21	Pat Durnin	Canada	141.726	45.91 (13)	2:27.08 (21)	1:33.58 (27)	–
NC22	Yuko Yaegashi-Ota	Japan	142.688	47.32 (29)	2:26.59 (20)	1:33.01 (22)	–
NC23	Brenda Webster	Canada	142.756	46.58 (24)	2:28.73 (25)	1:33.20 (23)	–
NC24	Anna Lenner	Sweden	143.066	46.08 (16)	2:31.01 (29)	1:33.30 (24)	–
NC25	Tarja Rinne	Finland	143.171	47.14 (27)	2:28.04 (24)	1:33.37 (25)	–
NC26	Brigitte Flierl	West Germany	143.230	46.27 (18)	2:30.27 (26)	1:33.74 (28)	–
NC27	Paula-Irmeli Halonen	Finland	143.251	46.42 (21)	2:31.25 (30)	1:32.83 (21)	–
NC28	Ann-Sofie Järnström	Sweden	143.511	46.50 (23)	2:30.86 (28)	1:33.45 (26)	–
NC29	Dolores Lier	Switzerland	144.635	48.01 (31)	2:27.81 (23)	1:34.71 (29)	–
NC30	Etsuko Nakamichi	Japan	145.691	47.85 (30)	2:30.35 (27)	1:35.45 (30)	–
NC31	Chen Shuhua	China	146.786	47.16 (28)	2:31.70 (31)	1:38.12 (31)	–

== Attribution ==
In Dutch
