= 1974 Women's World Allround Speed Skating Championships =

International speed skating competition

- Venue: Thialf, Heerenveen, Netherlands
- Dates: 23–24 February
- Competitors: 29 skaters from 12 countries

Medalist women
1st place, gold medalist(s)		Atje Keulen-Deelstra	NED
2nd place, silver medalist(s)		Tatyana Averina	URS
3rd place, bronze medalist(s)		Nina Statkevich	URS

The 35th edition of the World Allround Speed Skating Championships for Women took place on 23 and 24 February in Heerenveen at the Thialf ice rink.

Title holder was the Netherlander Atje Keulen-Deelstra.

== Distance medalists ==
Event	Gold (gold)	Silver (silver)	Bronze (bronze)
500m	Sheila Young	Keiko Hasegawa	Tatyana Averina
1500m	Atje Keulen-Deelstra	Sippie Tigchelaar	Sheila Young
1000m	Atje Keulen-Deelstra	Erwina Rys	Tatyana Averina
3000m	Atje Keulen-Deelstra	Sippie Tigchelaar	Nina Statkevich

== Classification ==
Rank	Skater	Country	Points Samalog	500m	1500m	1000m	3000m
1st place, gold medalist(s)	Atje Keulen-Deelstra	Netherlands	184.410	45.52 (5)	2:19.01 (gold)	1:28.91 (gold)	4:49.07 (gold)
2nd place, silver medalist(s)	Tatyana Averina	Soviet Union	186.869	45.11 (3)	2:22.13 (4)	1:30.22 (3)	4:54.63 (4)
3rd place, bronze medalist(s)	Nina Statkevich	Soviet Union	187.385	45.67 (6)	2:22.56 (5)	1:31.38 (6)	4:51.03 (3)
4	Sheila Young	United States	188.045	44.44 (gold)	2:21.52 (10)	1:30.43 (4)	5:07.30 (11)
5	Erwina Rys	Poland	188.703	45.69 (7)	2:24.10 (10)	1:30.01 (2)	4:59.85 (8)
6	Sippie Tigchelaar	Netherlands	189.642	48.10 (20)	2:20.58 (2)	1:32.62 (10)	4:50.23 (2)
7	Monika Pflug	West Germany	189.942	45.43 (4)	2:22.76 (6)	1:30.72 (5)	5:09.39 (14)
8	Tatyana Shelekhova-Rastopshyna	Soviet Union	190.520	46.02 (9)	2:24.78 (13)	1:32.46 (9)	5:00.06 (9)
9	Sijtje van der Lende	Netherlands	191.191	47.03 (12)	2:24.07 (9)	1:33.19 (14)	4:57.26 (6)
10	Galina Stepanskaya	Soviet Union	191.375	47.19 (13)	2:24.59 (12)	1:32.99 (11)	4:56.96 (5)
11	Sylvia Burka	Canada	192.525	46.39 (10)	2:25.51 (14)	1:31.41 (7)	5:11.56 (15)
12	Truus de Koning-Dijkstra	Netherlands	193.308	47.78 (18)	2:23.76 (8)	1:33.29 (15)	5:05.78 (10)
13	Mariko Sugawara	Japan	193.310	48.76 (24)	2:24.25 (11)	1:33.12 (12)	4:59.44 (7)
14	Connie Carpenter	United States	194.103	47.96 (19)	2:26.13 (16)	1:32.04 (8)	5:08.48 (13)
15	Ewa Malewicka	Poland	199.647	50.53 (29)	2:26.04 (15)	1:34.04 (17)	5:20.50 (16)
16	Monika Zernicek	East Germany	199.752	48.64 (22)	2:23.51 (7)	1:44.03 * (29)	5:07.56 * (12)
NC17	Leah Poulos	United States	141.178	45.76 (8)	2:26.53 (17)	1:33.15 (13)	–
NC18	Keiko Hasegawa	Japan	141.525	45.02 (2)	2:28.02 (21)	1:34.33 (18)	–
NC19	Gayle Gordon	Canada	143.153	46.68 (11)	2:27.43 (18)	1:34.66 (21)	–
NC20	Lisbeth Berg	Norway	143.545	47.38 (17)	2:27.48 (19)	1:34.01 (16)	–
NC21	Sigrid Sundby	Norway	143.810	47.30 (16)	2:27.81 (20)	1:34.48 (19)	–
NC22	Ann-Sofie Järnström	Sweden	144.895	47.25 (14)	2:31.20 (25)	1:34.49 (20)	–
NC23	Chieko Ito	Japan	146.667	48.74 (23)	2:31.19 (24)	1:35.06 (23)	–
NC24	Shan Xuxian	China	146.950	49.32 (25)	2:28.86 (22)	1:36.02 (24)	–
NC25	Tuula Vilkas	Finland	147.408	49.72 (27)	2:30.70 (23)	1:34.91 (22)	–
NC26	Linda Rombouts	Belgium	147.467	48.51 (21)	2:31.34 (26)	1:37.02 (26)	–
NC27	Monika Stützle	West Germany	148.808	49.77 (28)	2:32.41 (27)	1:36.47 (25)	–
NC28	Sylvia Filipsson	Sweden	150.797	49.49 (26)	2:36.89 (28)	1:38.02 (28)	–
NC29	Lena Tillqvist	Sweden	151.705	47.25 (14)	2:47.73 * (29)	1:37.09 (27)	–

* = Fall

== Attribution ==
In Dutch
