= 1979 World Allround Speed Skating Championships for women =

International speed skating competition

1979 World Allround Speed Skating Championships for Women
- Venue: De Uithof ice rink, The Hague, The Netherlands
- Dates: 3–4 February
- Competitors: 31 skaters from 14 countries

Medalist women
1st place, gold medalist(s)		Beth Heiden	USA
2nd place, silver medalist(s)		Natalya Petrusyova	SOV
3rd place, bronze medalist(s)		Sylvia Burka	CAN

The 40th edition of the World Allround Speed Skating Championships 1979 took place on 3 and 4 February at De Uithof ice rink in The Hague, The Netherlands:

Title holder was Tatyana Averina from the Soviet Union.

== Distance medalists ==
Event	Gold (gold)	Silver (silver)	Bronze (bronze)
500m	Beth Heiden	Sylvia Albrecht	Natalya Petrusyova
1500m	Beth Heiden	Natalya Petrusyova	Sylvia Burka
1000m	Beth Heiden	Tatyana Averina	Sylvia Burka
3000m	Beth Heiden	Bjørg Eva Jensen	Ria Visser

== Classification ==
Rank	Skater	Country	Points Samalog	500m	1500m	1000m	3000m
1st place, gold medalist(s)	Beth Heiden	United States	179.029	44.49 (gold)	2:13.79 (gold)	1:26.14 (gold)	4:41.24 * (gold)
2nd place, silver medalist(s)	Natalya Petrusyova	Soviet Union	181.721	44.88 (3)	2:14.73 (2)	1:28.19 (5)	4:47.02 (8)
3rd place, bronze medalist(s)	Sylvia Burka	Canada	181.994	45.52 (7)	2:15.62 (3)	1:27.53 (3)	4:45.02 (6)
4	Bjørg Eva Jensen	Norway	183.545	46.24 (15)	2:17.34 (6)	1:29.03 (11)	4:42.06 (2)
5	Valentina Lalenkova	Soviet Union	183.576	44.93 (4)	2:17.66 (7)	1:29.32 (14)	4:48.60 (10)
6	Ria Visser	Netherlands	184.014	46.69 (17)	2:16.52 (4)	1:29.30 (13)	4:43.01 (3)
7	Sijtje van der Lende	Netherlands	184.156	47.00 (23)	2:16.52 (4)	1:28.15 (4)	4:45.45 (7)
8	Sylvia Filipsson	Sweden	184.216	45.78 (9)	2:19.84 (11)	1:28.75 (9)	4:44.69 (5)
9	Sophie Westenbroek	Netherlands	184.319	45.09 (5)	2:18.70 (10)	1:29.41 (15)	4:49.75 (11)
10	Sylvia Albrecht	East Germany	184.875	44.83 (2)	2:20.46 (15)	1:28.83 (10)	4:52.86 (13)
11	Marion Dittmann	East Germany	184.954	45.91 (13)	2:21.10 (16)	1:29.13 (12)	4:44.68 (4)
12	Sarah Docter	United States	184.963	46.77 (18)	2:17.82 (8)	1:28.57 (7)	4:47.81 (9)
13	Erwina Ryś-Ferens	Poland	185.123	45.83 (12)	2:17.83 (9)	1:28.33 (6)	4:55.11 (14)
14	Yuko Yaegashi-Ota	Japan	187.661	46.21 (14)	2:20.04 (12)	1:30.59 (21)	4:56.86 (16)
15	Mary Docter	United States	187.958	46.91 (22)	2:20.34 (14)	1:31.69 (25)	4:50.54 (12)
16	Sigrid Smuda	West Germany	214.123	1:12.69 * (31)	2:20.22 (13)	1:30.67 (22)	4:56.15 (15)
NC17	Joke van Rijssel	Netherlands	137.875	45.82 (11)	2:21.18 (17)	1:29.99 (17)	–
NC18	Natalja Zaborskikh	Soviet Union	138.003	45.69 (8)	2:21.94 (19)	1:30.00 (18)	–
NC19	Linda Palle	Sweden	138.773	45.25 (6)	2:24.94 (23)	1:30.42 (20)	–
NC20	Kim Kostron	United States	138.776	45.79 (10)	2:21.62 (18)	1:31.56 (24)	–
NC21	Brenda Webster	Canada	139.035	46.80 (20)	2:23.64 (20)	1:28.71 (8)	–
NC22	Annette Carlén-Karlsson	Sweden	139.630	46.79 (19)	2:23.85 (22)	1:29.78 (16)	–
NC23	Kathy Vogt	Canada	139.653	46.66 (16)	2:23.68 (21)	1:30.20 (19)	–
NC24	Lilianna Morawiec	Poland	141.700	47.36 (26)	2:26.28 (24)	1:31.16 (23)	–
NC25	Ann-Mari Tollefsen	Norway	143.435	47.76 (28)	2:27.21 (26)	1:33.21 (27)	–
NC26	Grethe Viksaas	Norway	143.493	47.74 (27)	2:26.80 (25)	1:33.64 (28)	–
NC27	Marie-France van Helden	France	143.613	46.89 (21)	2:30.46 (30)	1:33.14 (26)	–
NC28	Dolores Lier	Switzerland	146.751	49.37 (29)	2:29.39 (29)	1:35.17 (30)	–
NC29	Pirjo Hyvärinen	Finland	154.473	47.25 (25)	2:28.09 (27)	1:55.72 * (31)	–
NC30	Kim Ferran	United Kingdom	169.925	1:12.65 * (30)	2:29.13 (28)	1:35.13 (29)	–
NC	Tatyana Averina	Soviet Union	90.790	47.07 (24)	DQ	1:27.44 (2)	–

* = Fell

== Attribution ==
In Dutch
