= 1972 World Allround Speed Skating Championships for women =

International speed skating competition

1972 World Allround Speed Skating Championships for Women
- Venue: Thialf, Heerenveen
- Dates: 4 – 5 March
- Competitors: 30 skaters from 11 countries

Medalist women
1st place, gold medalist(s)		Atje Keulen-Deelstra	NED
2nd place, silver medalist(s)		Stien Baas-Kaiser	NED
3rd place, bronze medalist(s)		Dianne Holum	USA

The 33rd edition of the World Allround Speed Skating Championships took place on 4 and 5 March in Heerenveen at the Thialf ice rink.

Title holder was the Netherlander Atje Keulen-Deelstra.

== Distance medalists ==
Event	Gold (gold)	Silver (silver)	Bronze (bronze)
500m	Dianne Holum	Leah Poulos	Atje Keulen-Deelstra
1500m	Atje Keulen-Deelstra	Stien Baas-Kaiser	Dianne Holum
1000m	Atje Keulen-Deelstra	Stien Baas-Kaiser	Dianne Holum
3000m	Stien Baas-Kaiser	Atje Keulen-Deelstra	Kapitolina Seryogina

== Classification ==
Rank	Skater	Land	Points Samalog	500m	1500m	1000m	3000m
1st place, gold medalist(s)	Atje Keulen-Deelstra	Netherlands	185.341	44.23 (3)	2:17.98 (gold)	1:30.49 (gold)	4:59.23 (2)
2nd place, silver medalist(s)	Stien Baas-Kaiser	Netherlands	185.543	44.81 (8)	2:18.09 (2)	1:31.20 (2)	4:54.62 (gold)
3rd place, bronze medalist(s)	Dianne Holum	United States	186.252	43.59 (gold)	2:18.51 (3)	1:31.73 (3)	5:03.76 (5)
4	Nina Statkevich	Soviet Union	188.831	45.04 (12)	2:20.71 (4)	1:32.55 (4)	5:03.68 (4)
5	Trijnie Rep	Netherlands	190.672	44.73 (7)	2:21.75 (6)	1:33.71 (8)	5:11.02 (8)
6	Lyudmila Titova	Soviet Union	191.728	44.85 (9)	2:21.87 (7)	1:33.69 (7)	5:16.46 (10)
7	Lyudmila Savrulina	Soviet Union	191.805	45.35 (13)	2:22.9 (9)	1:35.34 (14)	5:08.33 (6)
8	Kapitolina Seryogina	Soviet Union	191.887	46.74 (25)	2:22.40 (10)	1.34.14 (10)	5:03.66 (3)
9	Ellie van den Brom	Netherlands	192.078	44.35 (4)	2:24.64 (14)	1:32.96 (5)	5:18.21 (11)
10	Sachiko Saito-Yobekura	Japan	192.593	44.93 (10)	2:22.14 (8)	1:34.06 (9)	5:19.52 (12)
11	Tuula Vilkas	Finland	193.619	46.02 (21)	2:24.89 (15)	1:35.11 (12)	5:10.48 (7)
12	Sigrid Sundby	Norway	193.668	44.64 (6)	2:24.46 (13)	1:35.19 (13)	5:19.68 (13)
13	Wil Schenk-Burgmeijer	Netherlands	194.225	45.48 (16)	2:21.61 (5)	1:34.30 (11)	5:26.35 * (15)
14	Leah Poulos	United States	194.243	43.79 (2)	2:26.01 (20)	1:33.44 (6)	5:30.38 (16)
15	Galina Baranova	Soviet Union	194.923	47.16 (28)	2:22.96 (11)	1:36.21 (15)	5:12.03 (9)
16	Sylvia Burka	Canada	194.980	45.01 (11)	2:34.30 (12)	1:36.29 (16)	5:22.35 (14)
NC17	Connie Carpenter	United States	143.273	45.68 (17)	2:25.42 (17)	1:38.24 (17)	-
NC18	Rosemarie Taupadel	East Germany	143.688	45.79 (19)	2:24.91 (16)	1:39.19 (18)	-
NC19	Kaname Ide	Japan	143.765	45.39 (14)	2:25.89 (19)	1:39.49 (20)	-
NC20	Ylva Hedlund	Sweden	144.003	45.68 (17)	2:25.87 (18)	1:39.40 (19)	-
NC21	Sylvia Filipsson	Sweden	145.410	46.34 (22)	2:26.64 (21)	1:40.38 (22)	-
NC22	Tarja Rinne	Finland	145.490	46.35 (23)	2:27.36 (22)	1:40.04 (21)	-
NC23	Ann-Sofie Järnström	Sweden	146.272	44.58 (5)	2:29.81 (26)	1:43.51 (28)	-
NC24	Romana Troicka	Poland	146.388	45.46 (15)	2:28.18 (23)	1:43.07 (27)	-
NC25	Marja Repola	Finland	147.132	46.80 (26)	2:28.19 (24)	1:41.87 (24)	-
NC26	Erwina Rys	Poland	147.232	45.87 (20)	2:33.26 (29)	1:40.55 (23)	-
NC27	Monika Zernicek	East Germany	147.495	47.07 (27)	2:28.35 (25)	1:41.95 (26)	-
NC28	Tove Berntsen	Norway	147.775	46.56 (24)	2:30.81 (28)	1:41.89 (25)	-
NC29	Tien Cailian	China	150.762	47.90 (29)	2:30.35 (27)	1:45.49 (29)	-
NC30	Jiang Youfeng	China	153.342	48.13 (30)	2:34.64 (30)	1:47.33 (30)	-

* = Fell

== Attribution ==
In Dutch
