= Tamara Rylova =

Russian speed skater (1931–2021)

Personal information
- Born: Tamara Nikolayevna Rylova; 1 October 1931 Vologda, Russian SFSR, Soviet Union
- Died: 1 February 2021 (aged 89)
- Height: 1.63 m (5 ft 4 in)
- Weight: 66 kg (146 lb)

Sport
- Country: Soviet Union
- Sport: Speed skating
Medal record
Women's speed skating
Representing Soviet Union
Olympic Games
Bronze medal – third place	1960 Squaw Valley	1,000 m
World Championships
Gold medal – first place	1959 Sverdlovsk	Allround
Silver medal – second place	1955 Kuopio	Allround
Silver medal – second place	1957 Imatra	Allround
Silver medal – second place	1958 Kristinehamn	Allround
Silver medal – second place	1960 Östersund	Allround
Bronze medal – third place	1956 Kvarnsveden	Allround
Bronze medal – third place	1964 Kristinehamn	Allround

Tamara Nikolayevna Rylova (Russian: Тамара Николаевна Рылова; 1 October 1931 – 1 February 2021) was a speed skater.

== Career ==
After World War II had ended, Soviet women started dominating speed skating and would continue do so for at least 20 years. Tamara Rylova was one of them. She trained at Burevestnik in Leningrad. Having debuted nationally at the 1952 Soviet Allround Championships and internationally at the 1954 World Allround Championships, Rylova soon became a force to be reckoned with. Early 1955, Rylova proved this by setting a new world record on the 500 m – breaking Laila Schou Nilsen's record that had stood for almost 18 years. That same month, she would break two more world records.

The next month, she won silver at the 1955 World Allround Championships behind fellow Soviet skater Rimma Zhukova and that already showed that most of the time, Rylova's strongest competition was from other Soviet skaters. The next year, she won bronze, behind two Soviet skaters, thus making all three medals going to the Soviet Union. And this was not an exception, rather it was the rule. In fact, in the years 1953–1964, Soviet women won all three medals at every one of those twelve World Allround Championships.

In 1957 and 1958, Rylova won two more silver medals at the World Allround Championships, both behind Inga Artamonova. Finally, in 1959, she became World Allround Champion, with a big lead over silver medallist Valentina Stenina. The next year, she won yet another silver medal at the 1960 World Allround Championships, this time not being able to retain her lead after three of the four distances because Stenina skated the final distance, the 3,000 m, more than seven seconds faster. At the Winter Olympics of Squaw Valley the next month, Rylova (now the world record holder on the 500 m and the 1,000 m) had a somewhat disappointing performance; she finished fourth on the 500 m, one tenth of a second short of a medal, and she won the bronze medal on the 1,000 m.

After that, Rylova would not make any more international appearances except once, four years later, when she won another bronze medal at the 1964 World Allround Championship. During the intermediate years, she had not won much on a national level. Her last appearance at the Soviet Allround Championships was in 1966.

== Medals ==
An overview of medals won by Rylova at important championships she participated in, listing the years in which she won each:

Championships	Gold medal	Silver medal	Bronze medal
Winter Olympics	–	–	1960 (1,000 m)
World Allround	1959	1955; 1957; 1958; 1960	1956; 1964
Soviet Allround	1955; 1957; 1959; 1960	1958	1954; 1964

== World records ==
Over the course of her career, Rylova skated four world records:

Event	Result	Date	Venue
500 m	45.6	11 January 1955	Medeo
1,000 m	1:33.4	12 January 1955	Medeo
Old combination	203.920	22 January 1955	Medeo
Mini combination	196.416	21 January 1960	Medeo
