= Tuzova =

Tuzova is a surname. Notable people with the surname include:

- Albina Tuzova (1929–1984), Soviet speed skater
- Tanya Tuzova (born 1993), Russian artiste
