= World Allround Speed Skating Championships for Women =

Global annual speed skating competition

World Allround Speed Skating Championships
- Status: active
- Genre: sports event
- Date: January–March
- Frequency: biennial
- Location: various
- Inaugurated: 1933
- Organiser: ISU

The International Skating Union has organised the World Allround Speed Skating Championships for Women since 1936. Unofficial championships were held in the years 1933–1935.

== History ==
=== Distances used ===
- In the years 1933–1935, three distances were skated: 500 m, 1000 m and 1500 m.
- In the years 1936–1955, four distances were skated: 500 m, 1000 m, 3000 m and 5000 m (the old combination).
- In the years 1956–1982, four distances were skated: 500 m, 1000 m, 1500 m and 3000 m (the mini combination).
- Since 1983, four distances are skated: 500 m, 1500 m, 3000 m and 5000 m (the small combination).

=== Ranking systems used ===
- Since 1933, the samalog system has been in use. However, the rule that a skater winning at least three distances (at least two distances in 1933–1935) was automatically World Champion remained in effect until (and including) 1986. This rule was applied in 1949 when Maria Isakova from the Soviet Union won three distances and thus become World Champion despite after end of fourth distance (5000 m) she had a worse samalog score than her compatriots Zoya Kholshevnikova and Rimma Zhukova who won silver and bronze medals respectively.

=== Records ===
- Gunda Niemann-Stirnemann (née Kleemann) from East Germany won a total of 8 world championship titles, three consecutive in 1991, 1992, 1993, and another five consecutive titles in 1995, 1996, 1997, 1998 and 1999.
- Ireen Wüst from Netherlands has a record 13 medals, 12 of which were won in consecutive championships (2007–2018) – seven golds (2007, 2011, 2012, 2013, 2014, 2017, 2020), four silvers (2008, 2015, 2016, 2018) and two bronzes (2009, 2010). Previously, this record belonged to Claudia Pechstein from Germany – 11 medals in consecutive championships (1996–2006) with one gold (2000), eight silvers (1996, 1997, 1998, 1999, 2001, 2003, 2004, 2006) and two bronzes (2002, 2005).
- The youngest World Allround Champion is Laila Schou Nilsen from Norway who won her first of three world allround titles in 1935 at age 15 (although it was unofficial world championships). Two years later she won official world championships at age 17 (which is also a record).
- The oldest World Allround Champion is Atje Keulen-Deelstra from Netherlands who won her fourth and last world allround title in 1974 at age 35.
- Claudia Pechstein from Germany hold record by number of participations in the championships (25 times in 1992–2022).
- The biggest point margin between the winner and the second placed skater at the end of competition is 20.923 points between Verné Lesche from Finland and Else Marie Christiansen from Norway in 1947.
- At the 1949 championships, Maria Isakova from the Soviet Union won three distances and thus become World Allround Champion in accordance with then-existing rule. Being de-facto champion, she finished in 6th place at final distance (5000 m) and in third place in points classification by losing 1.510 points to her compatriot Zoya Kholshevnikova who eventually become silver medalist. Without taking into account this case, the smallest winning margin between the champion and the runner-up is 0.073 points between Soviet skaters Khalida Shchegoleyeva and Rimma Zhukova in 1953.
- There are eight speed skaters who become World Allround Champions by winning all four distances at the championships – Laila Schou Nilsen from Norway (1937), Verné Lesche from Finland (1947), Lidiya Skoblikova from the Soviet Union (1963 and 1964), Beth Heiden from the United States (1979), Andrea Schöne from East Germany (1985), Gunda Niemann from Germany (1995), Anni Friesinger from Germany (2005) and Cindy Klassen from Canada (2006). Lidiya Skoblikova is the only speed skater who achieved this feat twice.
- By contrast, there are five speed skaters who become World Allround Champions without winning any of four distances – Lidia Selikhova from the Soviet Union (1954), Valentina Stenina from the Soviet Union (1966), Atje Keulen-Deelstra from Netherlands (1970), Cindy Klassen from Canada (2003) and Ireen Wüst from Netherlands (2012).
- There are five female speed skaters who become champions both at the World Allround and the World Sprint Championships – Sylvia Burka from Canada (Allround: 1976; Sprint: 1977), Natalya Petrusyova from the Soviet Union (Allround: 1980, 1981; Sprint: 1982), Karin Kania (Enke, Busch) from East Germany (Allround: 1982, 1984, 1986, 1987, 1988; Sprint: 1980, 1981, 1983, 1984, 1986, 1987), Anni Friesinger from Germany (Allround: 2001, 2002, 2005; Sprint: 2007) and Miho Takagi from Japan (Allround: 2018; Sprint: 2020, 2024). Karin Kania (Enke, Busch) remained the only female speed skater who win both championships in one calendar year by firstly achieving this feat in 1984 and then repeating this success in 1986 and 1987. Anni Friesinger and Miho Takagi are the only female speed skaters who won world titles at three different championships – World Allround Championships, World Sprint Championships and World Single Distances Championships (at the latter competition Friesinger won 12 gold medals in 1998–2009 and Takagi won six gold medals in 2015–2025).

== Medal winners ==
=== Unofficial championships ===
Year	Location	Gold	Silver	Bronze
1933	Oslo	(Austria) Liselotte Landbeck	(Norway) Synnøve Lie	(United States) Helen Bina
1934	Oslo	(Norway) Undis Blikken	(Finland) Verné Lesche	(Norway) Synnøve Lie
1935	Oslo	(Norway) Laila Schou Nilsen	(Norway) Synnøve Lie	(United States) Kit Klein

=== Official championships ===
Year	Location	Gold	Silver	Bronze
1936	Stockholm	(United States) Kit Klein	(Finland) Verné Lesche	(Norway) Synnøve Lie
1937	Davos	(Norway) Laila Schou Nilsen	(Norway) Synnøve Lie	(Finland) Verné Lesche
1938	Oslo	(Norway) Laila Schou Nilsen (3 (Note: Laila Schou Nilsen won her first allround title in 1935 at the unofficial World Championships.))	(Finland) Verné Lesche	(Norway) Synnøve Lie
1939	Tampere	(Finland) Verné Lesche	(Finland) Liisa Salmi	(Finland) Laura Tamminen
1940	Not held due to World War II			
1941	Not held due to World War II			
1942	Not held due to World War II			
1943	Not held due to World War II			
1944	Not held due to World War II			
1945	Not held due to World War II			
1946	Not held due to World War II			
1947	Drammen	(Finland) Verné Lesche (2)	(Norway) Else Marie Christiansen	(Norway) Maggi Kvestad
1948	Turku	(Soviet Union) Maria Isakova	(Soviet Union) Lidia Selikhova	(Soviet Union) Zoya Kholshevnikova
1949	Kongsberg	(Soviet Union) Maria Isakova	(Soviet Union) Zoya Kholshevnikova	(Soviet Union) Rimma Zhukova
1950	Moscow	(Soviet Union) Maria Isakova (3)	(Soviet Union) Zinaida Krotova	(Soviet Union) Rimma Zhukova
1951	Eskilstuna	(Finland) Eevi Huttunen	(Norway) Randi Thorvaldsen	(Norway) Ragnhild Mikkelsen
1952	Kokkola	(Soviet Union) Lidia Selikhova	(Soviet Union) Maria Anikanova	(Norway) Randi Thorvaldsen
1953	Lillehammer	(Soviet Union) Khalida Shchegoleyeva	(Soviet Union) Rimma Zhukova	(Soviet Union) Lidia Selikhova
1954	Östersund	(Soviet Union) Lidia Selikhova (2)	(Soviet Union) Rimma Zhukova	(Soviet Union) Sofya Kondakova
1955	Kuopio	(Soviet Union) Rimma Zhukova	(Soviet Union) Tamara Rylova	(Soviet Union) Sofya Kondakova
1956	Kvarnsveden	(Soviet Union) Sofya Kondakova	(Soviet Union) Rimma Zhukova	(Soviet Union) Tamara Rylova
1957	Imatra	(Soviet Union) Inga Artamonova	(Soviet Union) Tamara Rylova	(Soviet Union) Lidia Selikhova
1958	Kristinehamn	(Soviet Union) Inga Artamonova	(Soviet Union) Tamara Rylova	(Soviet Union) Sofya Kondakova
1959	Sverdlovsk	(Soviet Union) Tamara Rylova	(Soviet Union) Valentina Stenina	(Soviet Union) Lidiya Skoblikova
1960	Östersund	(Soviet Union) Valentina Stenina	(Soviet Union) Tamara Rylova	(Soviet Union) Lidiya Skoblikova
1961	Tønsberg	(Soviet Union) Valentina Stenina	(Soviet Union) Albina Tuzova	(Soviet Union) Lidiya Skoblikova
1962	Imatra	(Soviet Union) Inga Voronina	(Soviet Union) Lidiya Skoblikova	(Soviet Union) Albina Tuzova
1963	Karuizawa	(Soviet Union) Lidiya Skoblikova	(Soviet Union) Inga Voronina	(Soviet Union) Valentina Stenina
1964	Kristinehamn	(Soviet Union) Lidiya Skoblikova (2)	(Soviet Union) Inga Voronina	(Soviet Union) Tamara Rylova
1965	Oulu	(Soviet Union) Inga Voronina (4)	(Soviet Union) Valentina Stenina	(Netherlands) Stien Kaiser
1966	Trondheim	(Soviet Union) Valentina Stenina (3)	(North Korea) Kim Song-soon	(Netherlands) Stien Kaiser
1967	Deventer	(Netherlands) Stien Kaiser	(Soviet Union) Lāsma Kauniste	(United States) Dianne Holum
1968	Helsinki	(Netherlands) Stien Kaiser (2)	(Netherlands) Ans Schut	(Netherlands) Carry Geijssen
1969	Grenoble	(Soviet Union) Lāsma Kauniste	(Netherlands) Stien Kaiser	(Netherlands) Ans Schut
1970	West Allis	(Netherlands) Atje Keulen-Deelstra	(Netherlands) Stien Kaiser	(Norway) Sigrid Sundby
1971	Helsinki	(Soviet Union) Nina Statkevich	(Netherlands) Stien Kaiser	(Soviet Union) Lyudmila Titova
1972	Heerenveen	(Netherlands) Atje Keulen-Deelstra	(Netherlands) Stien Baas-Kaiser	(United States) Dianne Holum
1973	Strömsund	(Netherlands) Atje Keulen-Deelstra	(Soviet Union) Tatyana Shelekhova	(Netherlands) Trijnie Rep
1974	Heerenveen	(Netherlands) Atje Keulen-Deelstra (4)	(Soviet Union) Tatyana Averina	(Soviet Union) Nina Statkevich
1975	Assen	(East Germany) Karin Kessow	(Soviet Union) Tatyana Averina	(United States) Sheila Young
1976	Gjøvik	(Canada) Sylvia Burka	(Soviet Union) Tatyana Averina	(United States) Sheila Young
1977	Keystone	(Soviet Union) Vera Bryndzei	(Soviet Union) Galina Stepanskaya	(Soviet Union) Galina Nikitina
1978	Helsinki	(Soviet Union) Tatyana Averina	(Soviet Union) Galina Stepanskaya	(East Germany) Marion Dittmann
1979	The Hague	(United States) Beth Heiden	(Soviet Union) Natalya Petrusyova	(Canada) Sylvia Burka
1980	Hamar	(Soviet Union) Natalya Petrusyova	(United States) Beth Heiden	(Norway) Bjørg Eva Jensen
1981	Sainte-Foy	(Soviet Union) Natalya Petrusyova (2)	(East Germany) Karin Enke	(United States) Sarah Docter
1982	Inzell	(East Germany) Karin Busch	(East Germany) Andrea Schöne	(Soviet Union) Natalya Petrusyova
1983	Karl-Marx-Stadt	(East Germany) Andrea Schöne	(East Germany) Karin Enke	(Soviet Union) Valentina Lalenkova
1984	Deventer	(East Germany) Karin Enke	(East Germany) Andrea Schöne	(East Germany) Gabi Schönbrunn
1985	Sarajevo	(East Germany) Andrea Schöne (2)	(East Germany) Gabi Schönbrunn	(East Germany) Sabine Brehm
1986	The Hague	(East Germany) Karin Kania	(East Germany) Andrea Ehrig	(East Germany) Sabine Brehm
1987	West Allis	(East Germany) Karin Kania	(East Germany) Andrea Ehrig	(Netherlands) Yvonne van Gennip
1988	Skien	(East Germany) Karin Kania (5)	(Netherlands) Yvonne van Gennip	(Poland) Erwina Ryś-Ferens
1989	Lake Placid	(East Germany) Constanze Moser	(East Germany) Gunda Kleemann	(Netherlands) Yvonne van Gennip
1990	Calgary	(East Germany) Jacqueline Börner	(Japan) Seiko Hashimoto	(East Germany) Constanze Moser
1991	Hamar	(Germany) Gunda Kleemann	(Germany) Heike Warnicke	(Netherlands) Lia van Schie
1992	Heerenveen	(Germany) Gunda Niemann	(Austria) Emese Hunyady	(Japan) Seiko Hashimoto
1993	Berlin	(Germany) Gunda Niemann	(Austria) Emese Hunyady	(Germany) Heike Warnicke
1994	Butte	(Austria) Emese Hunyady	(Germany) Ulrike Adeberg	(Romania) Mihaela Dascălu
1995	Savalen	(Germany) Gunda Niemann	(Kazakhstan) Lyudmila Prokasheva	(Netherlands) Annamarie Thomas
1996	Inzell	(Germany) Gunda Niemann	(Germany) Claudia Pechstein	(Japan) Mie Uehara
1997	Nagano	(Germany) Gunda Niemann	(Germany) Claudia Pechstein	(Netherlands) Tonny de Jong
1998	Heerenveen	(Germany) Gunda Niemann-Stirnemann	(Germany) Claudia Pechstein	(Germany) Anni Friesinger
1999	Hamar	(Germany) Gunda Niemann-Stirnemann (8)	(Germany) Claudia Pechstein	(Netherlands) Tonny de Jong
2000	Milwaukee	(Germany) Claudia Pechstein	(Germany) Gunda Niemann-Stirnemann	(Japan) Maki Tabata
2001	Budapest	(Germany) Anni Friesinger	(Germany) Claudia Pechstein	(Netherlands) Renate Groenewold
2002	Heerenveen	(Germany) Anni Friesinger	(Canada) Cindy Klassen	(Germany) Claudia Pechstein
2003	Gothenburg	(Canada) Cindy Klassen	(Germany) Claudia Pechstein	(Germany) Daniela Anschütz
2004	Hamar	(Netherlands) Renate Groenewold	(Germany) Claudia Pechstein	(Netherlands) Wieteke Cramer
2005	Moscow	(Germany) Anni Friesinger (3)	(Canada) Cindy Klassen	(Germany) Claudia Pechstein
2006	Calgary	(Canada) Cindy Klassen (2)	(Germany) Claudia Pechstein	(Canada) Kristina Groves
2007	Heerenveen	(Netherlands) Ireen Wüst	(Germany) Anni Friesinger	(Canada) Cindy Klassen
2008	Berlin	(Netherlands) Paulien van Deutekom	(Netherlands) Ireen Wüst	(Canada) Kristina Groves
2009	Hamar	(Czech Republic) Martina Sáblíková	(Canada) Kristina Groves	(Netherlands) Ireen Wüst
2010	Heerenveen	(Czech Republic) Martina Sáblíková	(Canada) Kristina Groves	(Netherlands) Ireen Wüst
2011	Calgary	(Netherlands) Ireen Wüst	(Canada) Christine Nesbitt	(Czech Republic) Martina Sáblíková
2012	Moscow	(Netherlands) Ireen Wüst	(Czech Republic) Martina Sáblíková	(Canada) Christine Nesbitt
2013	Hamar	(Netherlands) Ireen Wüst	(Netherlands) Diane Valkenburg	(Russia) Yekaterina Shikhova
2014	Heerenveen	(Netherlands) Ireen Wüst	(Russia) Olga Graf	(Netherlands) Yvonne Nauta
2015	Calgary	(Czech Republic) Martina Sáblíková	(Netherlands) Ireen Wüst	(Norway) Ida Njåtun
2016	Berlin	(Czech Republic) Martina Sáblíková	(Netherlands) Ireen Wüst	(Netherlands) Antoinette de Jong
2017	Hamar	(Netherlands) Ireen Wüst	(Czech Republic) Martina Sáblíková	(Japan) Miho Takagi
2018	Amsterdam	(Japan) Miho Takagi	(Netherlands) Ireen Wüst	(Netherlands) Annouk van der Weijden
2019	Calgary	(Czech Republic) Martina Sáblíková (5)	(Japan) Miho Takagi	(Netherlands) Antoinette de Jong
2020	Hamar	(Netherlands) Ireen Wüst (7)	(Canada) Ivanie Blondin	(Netherlands) Antoinette de Jong
2022	Hamar	(Netherlands) Irene Schouten	(Japan) Miho Takagi	(Netherlands) Antoinette de Jong
2024	Inzell	(Netherlands) Joy Beune	(Netherlands) Marijke Groenewoud	(Netherlands) Antoinette Rijpma-de Jong
2026	Heerenveen	(Norway) Ragne Wiklund	(Netherlands) Marijke Groenewoud	(Japan) Miho Takagi

=== All-time medal count ===
Rank	Nation	Gold	Silver	Bronze	Total
1	Soviet Union	24	25	20	69
2	Netherlands	17	13	22	52
3	Germany	12	12	5	29
4	East Germany	10	8	5	23
5	Norway	5	5	9	19
6	Czech Republic	5	2	1	8
7	Canada	3	6	5	14
8	Finland	3	4	2	9
9	Austria	2	2	0	4
10	United States	2	1	7	10
11	Japan	1	3	5	9
12	Russia	0	1	1	2
13	Kazakhstan	0	1	0	1
13	North Korea	0	1	0	1
15	Poland	0	0	1	1
15	Romania	0	0	1	1
Totals (16 entries)		84	84	84	252

Unofficial World Championships of 1933–1935 (not recognized by the ISU) included

== Multiple medalists ==
Boldface denotes active skaters and highest medal count among all skaters (including those not included in these tables) per type.

Rank	Skater	Country	From	To	Gold	Silver	Bronze	Total
1	Gunda Niemann-Stirnemann (Kleemann)	East Germany; Germany	1989	2000	**8**	2	–	10
2	Ireen Wüst	Netherlands	2007	2020	7	4	2	**13**
3	Martina Sáblíková	Czech Republic	2009	2019	5	2	1	8
4	Karin Kania (Enke, Busch)	East Germany	1981	1988	5	2	–	7
5	Inga Voronina (Artamonova)	Soviet Union	1957	1965	4	2	–	6
6	Atje Keulen-Deelstra	Netherlands	1970	1974	4	–	–	4
7	Valentina Stenina	Soviet Union	1959	1966	3	2	1	6
8	Anni Friesinger	Germany	1998	2007	3	1	1	5
9	Maria Isakova	Soviet Union	1948	1950	3	–	–	3
9	Laila Schou Nilsen	Norway	1935	1938	3 *	–	–	3 *

* including one medal won at the unofficial championship of 1935.

== See also ==
- World Allround Speed Skating Championships for Men
