= Laura Tamminen =

Personal information
- Nationality: Finnish
- Born: May 30th 1917
- Died: March 23 2001 Pålsboda

Sport
- Sport: Speed skating
Medal record
Representing Finland
Women's speed skating
World Championships
Bronze medal – third place	1939 Tampere	Allround

Laura Tamminen was a Finnish speed skater. She was born in 1917 and died in 2001. She won a bronze medal at the World Allround Speed Skating Championships for Women in 1939 in Tampere, behind Verné Lesche and Liisa Salmi.
