= 1981 World Allround Speed Skating Championships for women =

International speed skating competition

1981 World Allround Speed Skating Championships for Women
- Venue: Anneau Gaétan-Boucher Oval, Sainte-Foy, Quebec City, Canada
- Dates: 6–7 February
- Competitors: 30 from 11 nations

Medalist women
1st place, gold medalist(s)		Natalya Petrusyova	SOV
2nd place, silver medalist(s)		Karin Enke	DDR
3rd place, bronze medalist(s)		Sarah Docter	USA

The 42nd edition of the World Allround Speed Skating Championships for Women took place on 6 and 7 February in Sainte-Foy, Quebec City at the Gaétan-Boucher ice rink.

Title holder was Natalya Petrusyova from the USSR.

== Distance medalists ==
Event	Gold (gold)	Silver (silver)	Bronze (bronze)
500m	Natalya Petrusyova	Karin Enke	Svetlana Kasjoek
1500m	Karin Enke	Natalya Petrusyova	Bjørg Eva Jensen
1000m	Natalya Petrusyova	Karin Enke	Sarah Docter
3000m	Olga Pleshkova	Bjørg Eva Jensen	Sarah Docter

== Classification ==
Rank	Skater	Country	Points Samalog	500m	1500m	1000m	3000m
1st place, gold medalist(s)	Natalja Petroeseva	Soviet Union	178.947	42.93 (gold)	2:13.70 (2)	1:25.90 (gold)	4:51.01 (6)
2nd place, silver medalist(s)	Karin Enke	East Germany	180.266	43.32 (2)	2:13.58 (gold)	1:28.03 (2)	4:50.43 (5)
3rd place, bronze medalist(s)	Sarah Docter	United States	182.441	45.30 (14)	2:15.27 (4)	1:28.57 (3)	4:46.60 (3)
4	Bjørg Eva Jensen	Norway	182.485	45.27 (13)	2:14.94 (3)	1:29.07 (4)	4:46.20 (2)
5	Irina Mikhaylova	Soviet Union	183.196	44.13 (4)	2:17.32 (9)	1:29.08 (5)	4:52.52 (8)
6	Olga Pleshkova	Soviet Union	183.254	45.45 (17)	2:16.16 (6)	1:30.00 (11)	4:44.51 (gold)
7	Erwina Ryś-Ferens	Poland	183.953	44.48 (8)	2:16.38 (7)	1:29.11 (6)	4:56.75 (13)
8	Svetlana Kasjoek	Soviet Union	184.280	43.90 (3)	2:19.17 (13)	1:29.22 (7)	4:56.28 (11)
9	Annette Karlsson	Sweden	184.739	44.33 (6)	2:18.61 (10)	1:29.62 (8)	4:56.38 (12)
10	Ines Bautzmann	East Germany	184.856	44.75 (9)	2:18.97 (12)	1:29.85 (9)	4:53.15 (9)
11	Gabi Schönbrunn	East Germany	185.663	45.41 (16)	2:16.06 (5)	1:32.66 (19)	4:51.42 (7)
12	Mary Docter	United States	186.134	46.31 (24)	2:16.94 (8)	1:31.85 (14)	4:49.52 (4)
13	Alie Boorsma	Netherlands	186.544	44.18 (5)	2:20.66 (16)	1:29.94 (10)	5:03.05 (15)
14	Annie Borckink	Netherlands	187.243	45.60 (18)	2:18.78 (11)	1:31.85 (14)	4:56.75 (13)
15	Ina Steenbruggen	Netherlands	187.873	45.93 (23)	2:19.74 (15)	1:32.66 (19)	4:54.20 (10)
16	Miyoshi Kato	Japan	188.631	45.87 (21)	2:19.31 (14)	1:30.67 (12)	5:05.94 (16)
NC17	Birgit Czak	East Germany	138.286	45.17 (12)	2:20.69 (17)	1:32.44 (18)	–
NC18	Seiko Hashimoto	Japan	138.401	45.13 (11)	2:21.47 (20)	1:32.23 (17)	–
NC19	Sylvie Daigle	Canada	138.595	44.36 (7)	2:22.02 (22)	1:33.79 (24)	–
NC20	Ann-Mari Tollefsen	Norway	138.603	45.71 (20)	2:21.04 (18)	1:31.76 (13)	–
NC21	Mona Iversen	Norway	138.801	45.69 (19)	2:21.32 (19)	1:32.01 (16)	–
NC22	Sigrid Smuda	West Germany	139.235	45.39 (15)	2:22.47 (25)	1:32.71 (21)	–
NC23	Ewa Bialkowska	Poland	139.245	44.84 (10)	2:22.89 (26)	1:33.55 (23)	–
NC24	Linda Palle	Sweden	139.640	45.87 (21)	2:22.14 (24)	1:32.78 (22)	–
NC25	Shigeko Tomita	Japan	141.133	46.82 (27)	2:21.70 (21)	1:34.16 (26)	–
NC26	Rose-Marie Karlsson	Sweden	141.575	46.40 (25)	2:24.45 (27)	1:34.05 (25)	–
NC27	Dorie Boyce	United States	141.806	46.93 (28)	2:22.13 (23)	1:35.00 (27)	–
NC28	Susan Sandvig	United States	144.761	47.09 (29)	2:27.65 (28)	1:36.91 (29)	–
NC29	Anne Girard	Canada	145.251	46.45 (26)	2:32.27 (30)	1:36.09 (28)	–
NC30	Mandy Horsepool	United Kingdom	148.721	49.13 (30)	2:28.61 (29)	1:40.11 (30)	–

* = Fall

== Attribution ==
In Dutch
