= 1984 World Allround Speed Skating Championships for women =

International speed skating competition

1984 World Allround Speed Skating Championships for Women
- Venue: IJsselstadion, Deventer, Netherlands
- Dates: 28–29 January
- Competitors: 30 from 13 nations

Medalist women
1st place, gold medalist(s)		Karin Enke	DDR
2nd place, silver medalist(s)		Andrea Schöne-Mitscherlich	DDR
3rd place, bronze medalist(s)		Gabi Schönbrunn	DDR

The 45th edition of the World Allround Speed Skating Championships for Women took place on 28 and 29 January 1984 in Deventer at the IJsselstadion ice rink.

Title holder was Andrea Schöne-Mitscherlich from East Germany.

== Distance medalists ==
Event	Gold (gold)	Silver (silver)	Bronze (bronze)
500m	Karin Enke	Natalya Glebova	Natalya Petrusyova
3000m	Karin Enke	Andrea Schöne-Mitscherlich	Mary Docter
1500m	Karin Enke	Andrea Schöne-Mitscherlich	Natalya Petrusyova
5000m	Andrea Schöne-Mitscherlich	Karin Enke	Gabi Schönbrunn

== Classification ==
Rank	Skater	Country	Points Samalog	500m	3000m	1500m	5000m
1st place, gold medalist(s)	Karin Enke	East Germany	175.510	42.04 (gold)	4:28.20 (gold)	2:05.59 (gold)	7:49.07 (2)
2nd place, silver medalist(s)	Andrea Schöne-Mitscherlich	East Germany	176.980	43.10 (5)	4:28.92 (2)	2:07.37 (2)	7:46.04 (gold)
3rd place, bronze medalist(s)	Gabi Schönbrunn	East Germany	181.063	43.92 (7)	4:38.94 (6)	2:10.44 (4)	7:51.73 (3)
4	Natalya Petrusyova	Soviet Union	181.765	42.48 (3)	4:44.39 (11)	2:09.58 (3)	8:06.94 (9)
5	Sabine Brehm	East Germany	182.079	43.95 (8)	4:37.03 (4)	2:14.34 (10)	7:51.78 (4)
6	Olga Pleshkova	Soviet Union	182.839	45.00 (18)	4:37.76 (5)	2:11.51 (6)	7:57.10 (7)
7	Natalya Glebova	Soviet Union	183.255	42.17 (2)	4:47.44 (15)	2:11.61 (7)	8:13.09(11)
8	Valentina Lalenkova-Golovenkina	Soviet Union	183.438	42.51 (4)	4:46.12 (14)	2:10.67 (5)	8:16.86 (13)
9	Bjørg Eva Jensen	Norway	183.698	45.24 (19)	4:39.42 (7)	2:13.72 (9)	7:53.15 (6)
10	Mary Docter	United States	183.986	45.62 (23)	4:32.44 (3)	2:17.15 (14)	7:52.44 (5)
11	Ria Visser	Netherlands	184.752	44.42 (11)	4:40.29 (8)	2:14.43 (11)	8:08.07 (10)
12	Yvonne van Gennip	Netherlands	184.780	44.68 (14)	4:41.90 (9)	2:13.69 (8)	8:05.54 (8)
13	Annette Karlsson	Sweden	187.070	44.70 (16)	4:44.75 (12)	2:15.60 (12)	8:17.12 (14)
14	Seiko Hashimoto	Japan	187.890	44.01 (9)	4:48.75 (16)	2:18.24 (15)	8:16.75 (12)
15	Marieke Stam	Netherlands	189.174	44.58 (13)	4:44.16 (10)	2:19.00 (18)	8:29.01 (16)
16	Nancy Swider	United States	189.995	46.00 (26)	4:44.76 (13)	2:20.23 (23)	8:17.92 (15)
NC17	Thea Limbach	Netherlands	139.633	45.36 (22)	4:53.54 (19)	2:16.05 (13)	–
NC18	Jane Goldman	United States	139.858	45.32 (20)	4:48.89 (17)	2:19.17 (19)	–
NC19	Aila Tartia	Finland	140.166	44.53 (12)	4:56.48 (23)	2:18.67 (17)	–
NC20	Sylvie Daigle	Canada	140.296	44.26 (10)	4:53.86 (20)	2:21.15 (24)	–
NC21	Sigrid Smuda	West Germany	140.548	45.35 (21)	4:54.63 (21)	2:18.28 (16)	–
NC22	Natalie Grenier	Canada	141.656	45.86 (25)	4:49.98 (18)	2:22.40 (25)	–
NC23	Ariane Loignon	Canada	142.646	46.84 (29)	4:56.28 (22)	2:19.28 (20)	–
NC24	Shoko Fusano	Japan	142.766	43.82 (6)	5:02.90 (27)	2:25.39 (28)	–
NC25	Miriam Heruth	West Germany	142.821	46.32 (27)	4:58.57 (25)	2:20.22 (22)	–
NC26	Jasmin Krohn	Sweden	142.829	46.83 (28)	4:56.62 (24)	2:19.69 (21)	–
NC27	Marie-France van Helden-Vives	France	143.851	45.76 (24)	5:00.03 (26)	2:24.76 (27)	–
NC28	Ewa Bialkowska	Poland	143.896	44.68 (14)	5:07.70 (28)	2:23.80 (26)	–
NC29	Hiromi Ozawa	Japan	146.203	44.79 (17)	5:14.84 (29)	2:26.82 (29)	–
NC30	Ans Kremer	New Zealand	160.256	54.10 (30)	5:24.78 (30)	2:36.08 (30)	–

== Attribution ==
In Dutch
