= 1982 World Allround Speed Skating Championships for women =

International speed skating competition

1982 World Allround Speed Skating Championships for Women
- Venue: Ludwig Schwabl Stadion, Inzell, West Germany
- Dates: 13–14 February
- Competitors: 30 from 15 nations

Medalist women
1st place, gold medalist(s)		Karin Busch-Enke	DDR
2nd place, silver medalist(s)		Andrea Schöne-Mitscherlich	DDR
3rd place, bronze medalist(s)		Natalya Petrusyova	SOV

The 43rd edition of the World Allround Speed Skating Championships for Women took place on 13 and 14 February 1982 in Inzell at the Ludwig Schwabl Stadion ice rink.

Title holder was Natalya Petrusyova from the USSR.

== Distance medalists ==
Event	Gold (gold)	Silver (silver)	Bronze (bronze)
500m	Karin Busch-Enke	Natalya Petrusyova	Alie Boorsma
1500m	Karin Busch-Enke	Natalya Petrusyova	Andrea Schöne-Mitscherlich
1000m	Karin Busch-Enke	Natalya Petrusyova	Andrea Schöne-Mitscherlich
3000m	Andrea Schöne-Mitscherlich	Gabi Schönbrunn	Sarah Docter

== Classification ==
Rank	Skater	Country	Points Samalog	500m	1500m	1000m	3000m
1st place, gold medalist(s)	Karin Busch-Enke	East Germany	168.271	40.81 (gold)	2:05.79 (gold)	1:20.98 (gold)	4:30.25 (5)
2nd place, silver medalist(s)	Andrea Schöne-Mitscherlich	East Germany	170.699	42.39 (8)	2:08.09 (3)	1:23.14 (3)	4:24.26 (gold)
3rd place, bronze medalist(s)	Natalya Petrusyova	Soviet Union	171.231	40.99 (2)	2:07.03 (2)	1:22.28 (2)	4:50.55 (7)
4	Gabi Schönbrunn	East Germany	171.576	42.41 (9)	2:08.11 (4)	1:23.64 (4)	4:27.86 (2)
5	Sarah Docter	United States	172.075	42.69 (15)	2:08.37 (5)	1:23.84 (5)	4:28.05 (3)
6	Bjørg Eva Jensen	Norway	172.870	42.65 (14)	2:09.54 (7)	1:24.32 (8)	4:29.28 (4)
7	Alie Boorsma	Netherlands	174.536	41.21 (3)	2:10.55 (10)	1:25.40 (10)	4:42.66 (11)
8	Natalja Shive-Glebova	Soviet Union	175.071	41.48 (4)	2:09.36 (6)	1:23.96 (6)	4:50.95 (14)
9	Joke van Rijssel	Netherlands	175.668	42.85 (16)	2:09.76 (8)	1:25.27 (9)	4:41.58 (8)
10	Annette Karlsson	Sweden	176.303	42.59 (12)	2:11.89 (13)	1:25.50 (12)	4:42.00 (10)
11	Thea Limbach	Netherlands	176.423	43.14 (19)	2:12.10 (15)	1:24.15 (7)	4:43.05 (12)
12	Mary Docter	United States	177.681	44.66 (29)	2:10.31 (9)	1:26.87 (17)	4:36.90 (6)
13	Shigeko Tomita	Japan	177.968	43.49 (22)	2:11.68 (12)	1:26.48 (16)	4:44.07 (13)
14	Monika Holzner-Pflug	West Germany	179.025	42.44 (10)	2:11.94 (14)	1:25.46 (11)	4:59.42 (16)
15	Miyoshi Kato	Japan	180.479	43.95 (26)	2:12.13 (16)	1:27.21 (18)	4:53.29 (15)
16	Marina Koltsova	Soviet Union	183.559	42.37 (7)	2:11.33 (11)	1:40.91 * (29)	4:41.75 (9)
NC17	Seiko Hashimoto	Japan	129.476	41.93 (5)	2:13.79 (18)	1:25.90 (14)	–
NC18	Sylvie Daigle	Canada	130.188	42.49 (11)	2:14.65 (19)	1:25.63 (13)	–
NC19	Marzia Peretti	Italy	130.531	41.96 (6)	2:16.58 (23)	1:26.09 (15)	–
NC20	Sylvia Brunner	Switzerland	131.820	42.64 (13)	2:16.38 (22)	1:27.44 (19)	–
NC21	Dorie Boyce	United States	132.168	43.15 (20)	2:15.28 (20)	1:27.85 (20)	–
NC22	Cao Guifeng	China	132.256	42.94 (17)	2:16.10 (21)	1:27.90 (21)	–
NC23	Olga Pleshkova	Soviet Union	132.658	43.97 (27)	2:13.69 (17)	1:28.25 (23)	–
NC24	Ewa Bialkowska	Poland	133.631	43.01 (18)	2:18.17 (28)	1:29.13 (26)	–
NC25	Aila Tartia	Finland	133.651	43.76 (24)	2:16.70 (24)	1:28.65 (24)	–
NC26	Natalie Grenier	Canada	133.756	43.76 (24)	2:17.99 (27)	1:28.00 (22)	–
NC27	Turid Lillehagen	Norway	133.953	43.46 (21)	2:17.35 (26)	1:29.42 (27)	–
NC28	Karin Rybäck	Sweden	134.715	44.63 (28)	2:16.71 (25)	1:29.03 (25)	–
NC29	Zofia Tokarczyk	Poland	134.885	43.74 (23)	2:19.02 (29)	1:29.61 (28)	–
NC30	Ans Kremer	New Zealand	155.333	51.15 (30)	2:38.26 (30)	1:42.86 (30)	–

* = Fall

== Attribution ==
In Dutch
