= 1971 Women's World Allround Speed Skating Championships =

International speed skating competition

- Venue: Oulunkylä Ice Rink, Helsinki, Finland
- Dates: 6–7 February
- Competitors: 30 skaters from 11 countries

Medalist women
1st place, gold medalist(s)		Nina Statkevich	URS
2nd place, silver medalist(s)		Stien Kaiser	NED
3rd place, bronze medalist(s)		Lyudmila Titova	URS

The 32nd edition of the World Allround Speed Skating Championships for Women took place on 6 and 7 February in Helsinki at the Oulunkylä Ice Rink.

Title holder was the Netherlander Atje Keulen-Deelstra.

== Distance medal winners ==
Event	Gold (gold)	Silver (silver)	Bronze (bronze)
500m	Anne Henning	Lyudmila Titova	Tatyana Averina
1500m	Nina Statkevich	Stien Kaiser	Dianne Holum
1000m	Dianne Holum	Stien Kaiser	Nina Statkevich
3000m	Stien Kaiser	Ans Schut	Nina Statkevich

== Classification ==
Rank	Skater	Country	Points Samalog	500m	1500m	1000m	3000m
1st place, gold medalist(s)	Nina Statkevich	Soviet Union	191.400	46.8 (4)	2:23.2 (gold)	1:34.0 (3)	4:59.2 (3)
2nd place, silver medalist(s)	Stien Kaiser	Netherlands	193.433	48.7 (17)	2:24.9 (2)	1:33.7 (2)	4:57.5 (gold)
3rd place, bronze medalist(s)	Lyudmila Titova	Soviet Union	195.883	45.8 (2)	2:29.1 (9)	1:35.2 (6)	5:16.7 (10)
4	Dianne Holum	United States	196.000	48.3 (15)	2:25.6 (3)	1:33.0 (gold)	5:16.0 (9)
5	Lisbeth Berg	Norway	196.184	46.8 (4)	2:27.5 (5)	1:36.2 (8)	5:12.9 (8)
6	Ans Schut	Netherlands	196.667	48.2 (14)	2:29.3 (10)	1:38.2 (18)	4:57.6 (2)
7	Tatyana Averina	Soviet Union	197.633	46.4 (3)	2:27.7 (6)	1:36.7 (11)	5:21.9 (14)
8	Kapitolina Seryogina	Soviet Union	197.683	49.2 (24)	2:26.7 (4)	1.36.5 (10)	5:08.0 (6)
9	Tuula Vilkas	Finland	198.166	47.9 (10)	2:29.8 (13)	1:36.7 (11)	5:11.9 (7)
10	Trijnie Rep	Netherlands	198.500	48.3 (15)	2:28.6 (7)	1:35.0 (5)	5:19.0 (12)
11	Satomi Saiko	Japan	198.884	49.9 (25)	2:28.7 (8)	1:36.9 (14)	5:05.8 (4)
12	Ylva Hedlund	Sweden	200.117	48.1 (12)	2:29.6 (12)	1:38.2 (18)	5:18.3 (11)
13	Kaname Ide	Japan	200.500	51.3 (29)	2:29.4 (11)	1:36.2 (8)	5:07.8 (5)
14	Anne Henning	United States	200.950	44.6 (gold)	2:33.9 (22)	1:36.9 (14)	5:39.6 (16)
15	Marja Repola	Finland	201.016	48.8 (20)	2:30.7 (15)	1:37.2 (17)	5:20.3 (13)
16	Monika Pflug	West Germany	201.867	47.6 (9)	2:29.9 (14)	1:36.8 (13)	5:35.4 (15)
NC17	Sigrid Sundby	Norway	147.050	49.0 (22)	2:31.8 (16)	1:34.9 (4)	–
NC18	Kirsti Biermann	Norway	147.333	46.9 (6)	2:31.9 (17)	1:39.6 (22)	–
NC19	Arja Kantola	Finland	147.800	48.1 (12)	2:33.6 (21)	1:37.0 (16)	–
NC20	Inger Karset	Norway	148.867	48.0 (11)	2:33.2 (18)	1:39.6 (22)	–
NC21	Sylvia Filipsson	Sweden	149.717	48.8 (20)	2:33.5 (20)	1:39.5 (21)	–
NC22	Romana Troicka	Poland	150.100	48.7 (17)	2:35.7 (23)	1:39.0 (20)	–
NC23	Leah Poulos	United States	150.333	47.4 (8)	2:37.3 (25)	1:41.0 (27)	–
NC24	Sylvie Chevauchet	France	152.100	49.9 (25)	2:35.7 (23)	1:40.6 (26)	–
NC25	Sylvia Burka	Canada	153.117	48.7 (17)	2:38.0 (26)	1:43.5 (28)	–
NC26	Helena Pilejczyk	Poland	153.167	50.4 (27)	2:38.0 (26)	1:40.2 (25)	–
NC27	Tove Berntsen	Norway	156.783	49.0 (22)	2:53.5 (29)	1:39.9 (24)	–
NC28	Jennifer Jackson	Canada	157.667	51.3 (29)	2:41.6 (28)	1:45.0 (29)	–
NC29	Rieneke Demming	Netherlands	164.150	50.28 (28)	2:33.3 (19)	2:05.1 * (30)	–
NC	Atje Keulen-Deelstra	Netherlands	95.200	47.3 (7)	DNF	1:35.8 (7)	–

* = Fall

== Attribution ==
In Dutch
