= 1986 World Allround Speed Skating Championships for women =

1986 World Allround Speed Skating Championships for Women
- Venue: De Uithof, The Hague, Netherlands
- Dates: 9–10 February
- Competitors: 34 from 18 nations

Medalist women
1st place, gold medalist(s)		Karin Kania-Enke	DDR
2nd place, silver medalist(s)		Andrea Schöne-Mitscherlich	DDR
3rd place, bronze medalist(s)		Sabine Brehm	DDR

The 47th edition of the World Allround Speed Skating Championships for Women took place on 8 and 9 February 1986 in The Hague at the De Uithof ice rink.

Title holder was Andrea Schöne-Mitscherlich from East Germany.

== Distance medalists ==
Event	Gold (gold)	Silver (silver)	Bronze (bronze)
500m	Karin Kania-Enke	Seiko Hashimoto	Bonnie Blair
3000m	Karin Kania-Enke	Andrea Schöne-Mitscherlich	Sabine Brehm
1500m	Karin Kania-Enke	Andrea Schöne-Mitscherlich	Yvonne van Gennip
5000m	Andrea Schöne-Mitscherlich	Sabine Brehm	Gabi Schönbrunn

== Classification ==
Rank	Skater	Country	Points Samalog	500m	3000m	1500m	5000m
1st place, gold medalist(s)	Karin Kania-Enke	East Germany	175.649	41.13 (gold)	4:27.77 (gold)	2:08.34 (gold)	7:51.11 (4)
2nd place, silver medalist(s)	Andrea Schöne-Mitscherlich	East Germany	176.810	42.47 (5)	4:29.41 (2)	2:09.45 (2)	7:42.89 (gold)
3rd place, bronze medalist(s)	Sabine Brehm	East Germany	179.732	43.06 (7)	4:34.86 (3)	2:12.00 (4)	7:48.62 (2)
4	Yvonne van Gennip	Netherlands	180.759	43.55 (9)	4:36.55 (4)	2:11.42 (3)	7:53.12 (5)
5	Gabi Schönbrunn	East Germany	181.649	43.86 (15)	4:39.00 (5)	2:12.65 (5)	7:50.73 (3)
6	Seiko Hashimoto	Japan	183.970	42.06 (2)	4:45.97 (8)	2:14.91 (9)	8:12.79 (12)
7	Marieke Stam	Netherlands	184.315	43.89 (16)	4:46.03 (9)	2:13.57 (6)	8:02.31 (7)
8	Yelena Lapuga	Soviet Union	184.905	43.83 (13)	4:45.91 (7)	2:13.97 (8)	8:07.68 (10)
9	Ria Visser	Netherlands	184.987	44.78 (25)	4:43.60 (6)	2:14.97 (10)	7:59.51 (6)
10	Annette Karlsson	Sweden	186.366	43.77 (11)	4:51.00 (11)	2:16.17 (12)	8:07.06 (9)
11	Wang Xiuli	China	186.562	42.48 (6)	4:53.26 (16)	2:13.95 (7)	8:25.56 (15)
12	Svetlana Boyko	Soviet Union	186.585	44.57 (23)	4:46.07 (10)	2:17.69 (16)	8:04.41 (8)
13	Petra Moolhuizen	Netherlands	187.415	44.32 (19)	4:51.33 (12)	2:15.42 (11)	8:14.00 (13)
14	Marie-France van Helden-Vives	France	188.591	44.14 (18)	4:51.46 (15)	2:17.33 (15)	8:20.99 (14)
15	Bjørg Eva Jensen	Norway	189.092	45.35 (28)	4:53.13 (15)	2:17.13 (14)	8:11.77 (11)
16	Nathalie Lambert	Canada	191.188	44.33 (20)	4:52.85 (14)	2:18.93 (20)	8:37.40 (16)
NC17	Katie Class	United States	138.084	43.18 (8)	4:53.81 (18)	2:17.81 (17)	–
NC18	Inga Gilauri	Soviet Union	138.380	43.82 (12)	4:53.40 (17)	2:16.98 (13)	–
NC19	Bonnie Blair	United States	138.627	42.11 (3)	5:02.59 (26)	2:18.26 (19)	–
NC20	Zofia Tokarczyk	Poland	139.833	42.22 (4)	5:06.44 (30)	2:19.62 (22)	–
NC21	Aila Tartia	Finland	140.077	44.11 (17)	4:56.53 (20)	2:19.64 (23)	–
NC22	Sigrid Fröschl-Smuda	West Germany	140.383	43.70 (10)	4:57.72 (21)	2:21.19 (25)	–
NC23	Natalie Grenier	Canada	140.401	43.83 (13)	4:54.51 (19)	2:22.46 (26)	–
NC24	Natsue Seki	Japan	141.647	44.35 (21)	5:01.51 (25)	2:21.14 (24)	–
NC25	Lena Andersson	Sweden	142.803	45.89 (30)	5:02.76 (27)	2:19.36 (21)	–
NC26	Kim Hyeon-na	South Korea	142.889	44.72 (24)	4:59.18 (22)	2:24.92 (30)	–
NC27	Angelika Haßmann	West Germany	143.201	45.59 (29)	5:00.47 (24)	2:22.60 (27)	–
NC28	Emese Nemeth-Hunyady	Austria	143.746	44.81 (26)	5:04.18 (28)	2:24.72 (29)	–
NC29	Ariane Loignon	Canada	151.169	44.44 (22)	4:59.26 (23)	2:50.56 * (34)	–
NC30	Karen Gardiner-Kah	Australia	155.133	49.94 (32)	5:24.66 (31)	2:24.66 (31)	–
NC31	Lee Kyung-ja	South Korea	155.244	56.83 * (34)	5:05.11 (29)	2:22.69 (28)	–
NC32	Bibija Kerla	Yugoslavia	155.610	48.59 (31)	5:30.78 (32)	2:35.67 (32)	–
NC33	Anje Kremer	New Zealand	161.383	52.78 (33)	5:33.90 (33)	2:38.86 (33)	–
NC	Keiko Asao	Japan	91.086	45.11 (27)	DQ	2:17.93 (18)	–

* = Fall
DQ = Disqualified

== Attribution ==
In Dutch
