= Selikhov =

Selikhov (Russian: Се́лихов), female form Selikhova (Russian: Се́лихова) is a Russian surname. Notable people with this surname include:

- Aleksandr Selikhov (born 1994), Russian football player
- Aleksey Selikhov, Russian equestrian
- Lidia Selikhova (1922–2003), Russian skater
- Yuri Selikhov (born 1941), Russian basketball player
- Yury Selikhov (born 1986), Russian bobsledder
