= 1970 Women's World Allround Speed Skating Championships =

International speed skating competition

- Venue: State Fair Park, West Allis, Wisconsin, United States
- Dates: 28 February – 1 March
- Competitors: 22 skaters from 8 countries

Medalist women
1st place, gold medalist(s)		Atje Keulen-Deelstra	NED
2nd place, silver medalist(s)		Stien Kaiser	NED
3rd place, bronze medalist(s)		Sigrid Sundby	NOR

The 31st edition of the World Allround Speed Skating Championships for Women took place on 28 February and 1 March in West Allis at the State Fair Park ice rink.

Title holder was Lāsma Kauniste from the USSR.

== Distance medalists ==
Distance	Gold (gold)	Silver (silver)	Bronze (bronze)
500m	Lyudmila Titova	Leah Poulos	Lisbeth Berg
1500m	Ans Schut	Stien Kaiser	Rieneke Demming
1000m	Lyudmila Titova; Sigrid Sundby	–	Atje Keulen-Deelstra
3000m	Ans Schut	Stien Kaiser	Rieneke Demming

== Classification ==
Rank	Skater	Country	Points Samalog	500m	1500m	1000m	3000m
1st place, gold medalist(s)	Atje Keulen-Deelstra	Netherlands	192.303	46.17 (6)	2:25.6 (4)	1:32.6 (3)	5:07.8 (4)
2nd place, silver medalist(s)	Stien Kaiser	Netherlands	192.780	47.38 (15)	2:23.9 (2)	1:34.4 (8)	5:01.4 (2)
3rd place, bronze medalist(s)	Sigrid Sundby	Norway	193.473	46.29 (7)	2:26.1 (5)	1:32.6 (gold)	5:11.9 (9)
4	Dianne Holum	United States	193.693	46.06 (4)	2:26.1 (5)	1:33.9 (6)	5:11.9 (6)
5	Lāsma Kauniste	Soviet Union	194.613	46.88 (12)	2:27.1 (9)	1.33.2 (4)	5:12.6 (8)
6	Lisbeth Berg	Norway	194.726	46.01 (3)	2:27.7 (12)	1:35.0 (12)	5:11.9 (6)
7	Ans Schut	Netherlands	195.104	46.72 (11)	2:23.3 (gold)	1:42.5 * (20)	4:56.2 (gold)
8	Ellie van den Brom	Netherlands	195.427	46.96 (14)	2:26.4 (7)	1:34.2 (7)	5:15.4 (12)
9	Rieneke Demming	Netherlands	195.636	48.27 (19)	2:24.4 (3)	1:36.9 (16)	5:04.7 (3)
10	Kirsti Biermann	Norway	195.756	46.44 (9)	2:27.1 (9)	1:36.0 (14)	5:13.7 (10)
11	Tuula Vilkas	Finland	195.797	48.03 (17)	2:26.7 (8)	1:34.4 (8)	5:10.0 (5)
12	Tatyana Averina	Soviet Union	196.083	46.65 (10)	2:27.7 (12)	1:35.3 (13)	5:15.3 (11)
13	Lyudmila Titova	Soviet Union	196.764	45.38 (gold)	2:27.2 (11)	1:32.6 (gold)	5:36.1 * (16)
14	Sachiko Saito	Japan	197.017	46.90 (13)	2:30.5 (15)	1:34.5 (11)	5:16.2 (13)
15	Tatyana Sidorova	Soviet Union	198.926	46.16 (5)	2:31.9 (16)	1:36.0 (14)	5:24.8 (15)
16	Akiko Aruga	Japan	210.073	58.14 * (22)	2:28.6 (14)	1:38.4 (18)	5:19.2 (14)
NC17	Nina Statkevich	Soviet Union	143.843	46.31 (8)	2:32.2 * (17)	1:33.6 (5)	–
NC18	Leah Poulos	United States	144.330	45.73 (2)	2:34.2 (18)	1:34.4 (8)	–
NC19	Paula Dufter	West Germany	149.590	48.49 (20)	2:36.6 (20)	1:37.8 (17)	–
NC20	Sylvia Burka	Canada	150.380	47.68 (16)	2:37.2 (21)	1:40.6 (19)	–
NC21	Jeanne Omelenchuk	United States	155.330	48.08 (21)	2:35.4 (19)	1:50.9 * (22)	–
NC22	Cheryl Rey	Canada	157.143	50.01 (21)	2:45.1 (22)	1:44.2 (21)	–

* = Fall

== Attribution ==
In Dutch
