= Liisa Salmi =

Finnish speed skater

Medal record

Representing Finland

Women's speed skating

World Championships
Silver medal – second place	1939 Tampere	Allround

Liisa Salmi (1 October 1914 - 30 August 2001) was a Finnish speed skater. She won a silver medal at the World Allround Speed Skating Championships for Women in 1939 in Tampere, behind Verne Lesche.
