= Zinaida Krotova =

Personal information
- Nationality: Soviet
- Born: 1923
- Died: 2008 (aged 84–85)

Sport
- Sport: Speed skating
Medal record
Representing Soviet Union
Women's speed skating
World Championships
Silver medal – second place	1950 Moscow	Allround

Zinaida Krotova (Russian: Зинаида Кротова; 1923–2008) was a former Soviet female speed skater. She won a silver medal at the World Allround Speed Skating Championships for Women in 1950 in Moscow.
