= Maria Anikanova =

Soviet speed skater (1916-2005)

Personal information
- Nationality: Soviet
- Born: 25 November 1916
- Died: 2005 (aged 88–89)

Sport
- Sport: Speed skating
Medal record
Representing Soviet Union
Women's speed skating
World Championships
Silver medal – second place	1952 Kokkola	Allround

Maria Anikanova (Russian: Мария Аниканова; 25 November 1916 – 2005) was a Soviet female speed skater. She won a silver medal at the World Allround Speed Skating Championships for Women in 1952.
