= 1985 World Allround Speed Skating Championships for women =

International speed skating competition

1985 World Allround Speed Skating Championships for Women
- Venue: Zetra Ice Rink, Sarajevo, Yugoslavia
- Dates: 9–10 February
- Competitors: 31 from 15 nations

Medalist women
1st place, gold medalist(s)		Andrea Schöne-Mitscherlich	DDR
2nd place, silver medalist(s)		Gabi Schönbrunn	DDR
3rd place, bronze medalist(s)		Sabine Brehm	DDR

The 46th edition of the World Allround Speed Skating Championships for Women took place on 9 and 10 February 1985 in Sarajevo, Yugoslavia at the Zetra Ice Rink.

Title holder was Karin Enke from East Germany.

== Distance medalists ==
Event	Gold (gold)	Silver (silver)	Bronze (bronze)
500m	Andrea Schöne-Mitscherlich	Irina Fatejeva	Bonnie Blair; Seiko Hashimoto
3000m	Andrea Schöne-Mitscherlich	Gabi Schönbrunn	Heike Schalling
1500m	Andrea Schöne-Mitscherlich	Sabine Brehm	Gabi Schönbrunn
5000m	Andrea Schöne-Mitscherlich	Gabi Schönbrunn	Yvonne van Gennip

== Classification ==
Rank	Skater	Country	Points Samalog	500m	3000m	1500m	5000m
1st place, gold medalist(s)	Andrea Schöne-Mitscherlich	East Germany	173.853	41.0 (gold)	4:34.49 (gold)	2:05.47 (gold)	7:32.82 (gold)
2nd place, silver medalist(s)	Gabi Schönbrunn	East Germany	176.798	42.2 (9)	4:37.27 (2)	2:08.10 (3)	7:36.87 (2)
3rd place, bronze medalist(s)	Sabine Brehm	East Germany	177.122	41.7 (5)	4:41.96 (5)	2:06.15 (2)	7:43.79 (4)
4	Yvonne van Gennip	Netherlands	178.067	42.5 (10)	4:39.12 (4)	2:09.48 (5)	7:38.87 (3)
5	Olga Pleshkova	Soviet Union	179.588	42.8 (12)	4:44.12 (6)	2:08.46 (4)	7:46.15 (5)
6	Heike Schalling	East Germany	179.963	43.7 (21)	4:37.86 (3)	2:09.49 (6)	7:47.90 (6)
7	Seiko Hashimoto	Japan	180.134	41.4 (3)	4:49.09 (7)	2:09.64 (7)	7:53.40 (7)
8	Irina Fatejeva	Soviet Union	181.359	41.3 (2)	4:53.86 (13)	2:09.68 (8)	8:58.57 (10)
9	Marieke Stam	Netherlands	182.426	43.0 (15)	4:49.18 (8)	2:11.48 (11)	7:54.04 (8)
10	Annette Karlsson	Sweden	182.821	42.9 (13)	4:52.31 (12)	2:10.64 (9)	7:56.57 (9)
11	Park Gum-Hyon	North Korea	183.250	42.1 (8)	4:51.56 (11)	2:11.16 (10)	8:08.37 (14)
12	Thea Limbach	Netherlands	184.129	43.2 (17)	4:53.87 (14)	2:11.95 (12)	7:59.68 (11)
13	Angelika Haßmann	West Germany	186.262	44.4 (24)	4:50.54 (9)	2:15.46 (20)	8:02.86 (12)
14	Marie-France van Helden-Vives	France	188.168	43.8 (22)	4:54.09 (16)	2:15.83 (23)	8:20.77 (16)
15	Jasmin Krohn	Sweden	189.415	44.7 (26)	4:53.96 (15)	2:17.00 (26)	8:20.56 (15)
16	Irina Bogatova	Soviet Union	195.938	54.7 * (31)	4:51.07 (10)	2:12.85 (16)	8:04.44 (13)
NC17	Alie Boorsma	Netherlands	135.158	42.0 (7)	4:54.17 (17)	2:12.39 (14)	8:08.07 (10)
NC18	Bonnie Blair	United States	135.189	41.4 (3)	4:54.20 (18)	2:14.27 (18)	7:52.44 (5)
NC19	Natalie Grenier	Canada	136.671	43.3 (18)	4:55.69 (20)	2:12.27 (13)	–
NC20	Miyuki Gonoi	Japan	138.419	42.9 (13)	5:02.02 (24)	2:15.55 (21)	–
NC21	Lee Kyung-ja	South Korea	138.498	44.1 (23)	4:54.57 (19)	2:15.91 (25)	–
NC22	Nathalie Lambert	Canada	138.661	43.4 (19)	5:06.29 (26)	2:12.64 (15)	–
NC23	Jane Goldman	United States	138.747	43.5 (20)	4:59.83 (23)	2:15.83 (23)	–
NC24	Edel Therese Høiseth	Norway	139.198	41.9 (6)	5:12.21 (28)	2:15.79 (22)	–
NC25	Lilianna Jezierska-Morawiec	Poland	139.303	42.5 (10)	5:13.76 (30)	2:13.53 (17)	–
NC26	Aila Tartia	Finland	139.979	43.1 (16)	5:11.42 (27)	2:14.93 (19)	–
NC27	Larisa Kharlamova	Soviet Union	140.477	44.9 (27)	4:58.81 (21)	2:17.33 (27)	–
NC28	Kelly Mullen	United States	141.698	44.9 (27)	4:59.57 (22)	2:20.61 (29)	–
NC29	Taina Salmia	Finland	141.972	44.9 (27)	5:03.52 (25)	2:19.46 (28)	–
NC30	Moira d'Andrea	United States	144.225	44.6 (25)	5:12.45 (29)	2:22.65 (30)	–
NC31	Bibija Kerla	Yugoslavia	157.691	49.3 (30)	5:40.31 (31)	2:35.02 (31)	–

* = Fall

== Attribution ==
In Dutch
