= 1988 World Allround Speed Skating Championships for Women =

International speed skating competition

- Venue: Skien Isstadion, Skien, Norway
- Dates: 12–13 March
- Competitors: 28 from 14 nations

Medalist women
1st place, gold medalist(s)		Karin Kania-Enke	DDR
2nd place, silver medalist(s)		Yvonne van Gennip	NED
3rd place, bronze medalist(s)		Erwina Ryś-Ferens	POL

The 49th edition of the World Allround Speed Skating Championships for Women took place on 12 and 13 March 1988 in Skien at the Skien Isstadion ice rink.

The titleholder is Karin Kania-Enke from East Germany.

== Distance medalists ==
Event	Gold (gold)	Silver (silver)	Bronze (bronze)
500m	Karin Kania-Enke	Seiko Hashimoto	Erwina Ryś-Ferens
3000m	Karin Kania-Enke	Yvonne van Gennip	Gabi Zange-Schönbrunn
1500m	Karin Kania-Enke	Yvonne van Gennip	Erwina Ryś-Ferens
5000m	Yvonne van Gennip	Gabi Zange-Schönbrunn	Karin Kania-Enke

== Classification ==
Rank	Skater	Country	Points Samalog	500m	3000m	1500m	5000m
1st place, gold medalist(s)	Karin Kania-Enke	East Germany	178.313	41.33 (gold)	4:34.78 (gold)	2:09.75 (gold)	7:59.37 (3)
2nd place, silver medalist(s)	Yvonne van Gennip	Netherlands	180.054	43.14 (5)	4:37.58 (2)	2:09.96 (2)	7:53.31 (gold)
3rd place, bronze medalist(s)	Erwina Ryś-Ferens	Poland	182.682	42.85 (3)	4:40.52 (5)	2:12.76 (3)	8:08.26 (5)
4	Gabi Zange-Schönbrunn	East Germany	183.555	44.15 (14)	4:39.74 (3)	2:14.63 (9)	7:59.06 (2)
5	Petra Moolhuizen	Netherlands	184.299	44.54 (20)	4:39.76 (4)	2:13.71 (6)	8:05.63 (4)
6	Yelena Lapuga	Soviet Union	185.399	44.41 (19)	4:43.22 (6)	2:14.00 (7)	8:11.20 (6)
7	Constanze Scandolo	East Germany	185.435	43.62 (10)	4:46.07 (8)	2:12.99 (4)	8:18.07 (8)
8	Irina Bogatova	Soviet Union	187.375	43.21 (6)	4:48.31 (9)	2:17.50 (14)	8:22.81 (13)
9	Leslie Bader	United States	187.480	42.86 (4)	4:49.71 (12)	2:13.63 (5)	8:37.92 (16)
10	Inga Gilauri	Soviet Union	187.780	44.21 (15)	4:48.92 (10)	2:16.50 (12)	8:19.17 (10)
11	Ariane Loignon	Canada	188.174	43.53 (9)	4:51.24 (16)	2:18.16 (18)	8:20.51 (12)
12	Svetlana Boyko	Soviet Union	188.207	45.69 (25)	4:45.06 (7)	2:17.55 (15)	8:11.57 (7)
13	Elena Belci	Italy	188.389	44.79 (22)	4:51.11 (15)	2:15.56 (11)	8:18.95 (9)
14	Marga Preuter	Netherlands	188.812	43.82 (11)	4:49.59 (11)	2:20.24 (22)	8:19.81 (11)
15	Natalie Grenier	Canada	188.923	43.27 (7)	4:51.06 (14)	2:18.01 (16)	8:31.40 (15)
16	Minna Nystedt	Norway	192.245	45.97 (27)	4:50.92 (13)	2:21.20 (24)	8:27.23 (14)
NC17	Marieke Stam	Netherlands	138.211	43.88 (12)	4:52.21 (17)	2:16.89 (13)	–
NC18	Emese Nemeth-Hunyady	Austria	138.302	43.28 (8)	4:54.04 (22)	2:18.05 (17)	–
NC19	Katie Class	United States	139.971	45.95 * (26)	4:53.53 (20)	2:15.30 (10)	–
NC20	Jane Goldman	United States	140.404	45.25 (24)	4:52.55 (18)	2:19.19 (19)	–
NC21	Anja Mischke	West Germany	140.433	44.26 (16)	4:53.78 (21)	2:21.63 (25)	–
NC22	Natsue Seki	Japan	140.629	45.08 (23)	4:52.94 (19)	2:20.18 (21)	–
NC23	Aila Tartia	Finland	141.076	44.77 (21)	4:58.54 (23)	2:19.65 (20)	–
NC24	Chantal Côté	Canada	141.870	44.35 (18)	5:00.60 (24)	2:22.26 (26)	–
NC25	Ylva Fors	Sweden	142.859	44.01 (13)	5:12.08 (25)	2:20.51 (23)	–
NC26	Anette Hammarin	Sweden	145.041	44.32 (17)	5:12.97 (26)	2:25.68 (27)	–
NC27	Anje Kremer	New Zealand	163.511	54.13 (28)	5:34.75 (27)	2:40.77 (28)	–
NC	Seiko Hashimoto	Japan	86.860	42.17 (2)	DQ	2:14.07 (8)	–

* = Fall
DQ = Disqualified

== Attribution ==
In Dutch
