= Zoya Kholshevnikova =

Soviet speed skater

Medal record

Representing Soviet Union

Women's speed skating

World Championships
Silver medal – second place	1949 Kongsberg	Allround
Bronze medal – third place	1948 Turku	Allround

Zoya Kholshevnikova (Russian: Зоя Холщевникова; December 31, 1920 - June 12, 1991) is a former Soviet female speed skater. She won a silver medal at the World Allround Speed Skating Championships for Women in 1949, and a bronze medal in 1948.

She has broken once the 3000 m world record.
