= Sofya Kondakova =

Soviet speed skater

Medal record

Representing Soviet Union

Women's speed skating

World Championships
Gold medal – first place	1956 Karnsveden	Allround
Bronze medal – third place	1954 Östersund	Allround
Bronze medal – third place	1955 Kuopio	Allround

Sofya Kondakova (Russian: Софья Кондакова; born 1922. (Note: Sources differ on her date of birth which is claimed to be either 1 January 1922 or 23 December 1922) – 24 September 2012) was a Soviet female speed skater. She won a gold medal at the World Allround Speed Skating Championships for Women in 1956, and bronze medals in 1954 and 1955.
