= Khalida Shchegoleyeva =

Medal record

Representing Soviet Union

Women's speed skating

World Championships
Gold medal – first place	1953 Lillehammer	Allround

Khalida Shchegoleyeva (Russian: Халида Щеголеева; born 1933) is a former Soviet female speed skater. She won a gold medal at the World Allround Speed Skating Championships for Women in 1953.
