= Maria Isakova =

Soviet speed skater

Medal record

Representing Soviet Union

Women's speed skating

World Championships
Gold medal – first place	1948 Turku	Allround
Gold medal – first place	1949 Kongsberg	Allround
Gold medal – first place	1950 Moscow	Allround

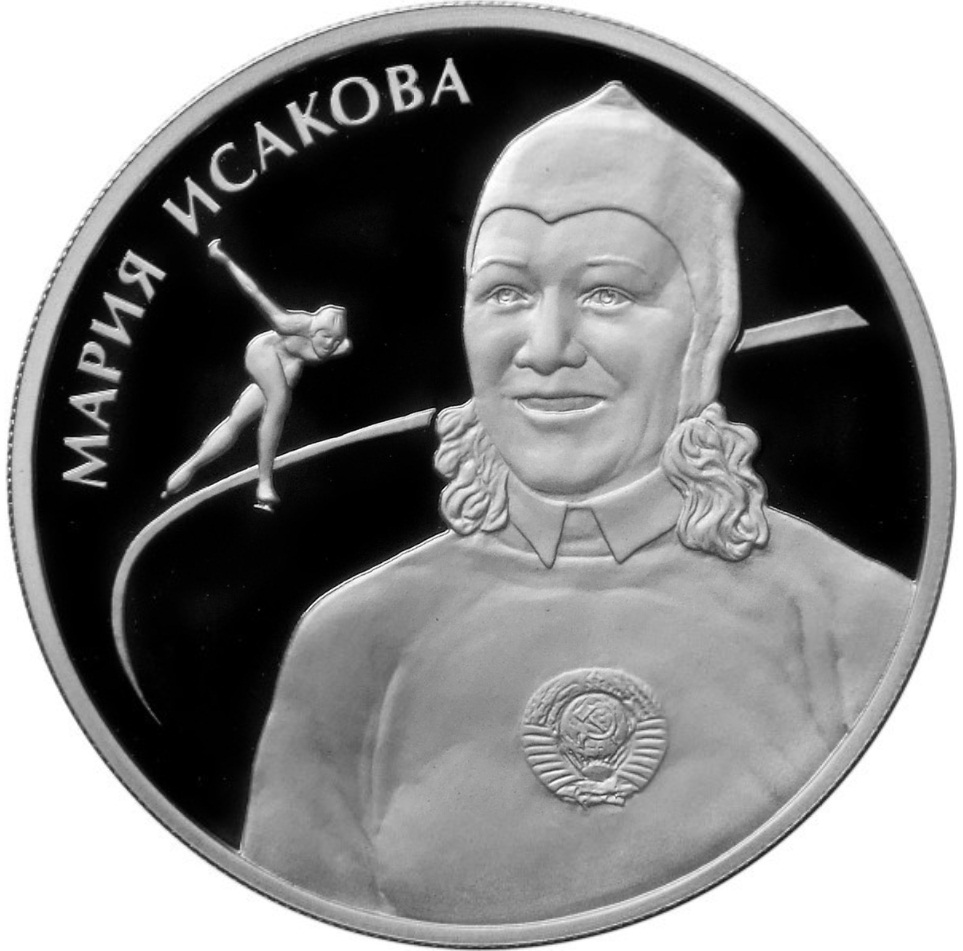
Maria Isakova

Maria Grigoryevna Isakova (Russian: Мария Григорьевна Исакова; 5 July 1918 – 25 March 2011), was a world champion speed skater. She was born in Vyatka (now Kirov), Russian SFSR, and competed for the Soviet Union.

== History ==
Isakova started skating at a very young age, spending many hours every day on the ice because she liked skating very much. Her speed prompted people in Vyatka to tell her to enter the Soviet Allround Championships. She hesitated but then relented to participate in the 1936 Soviet Allround Championships, pretending to be aged 17 (she was not allowed to compete at her true age of 15); she finished fifth.

After the Axis invasion of the USSR in summer 1941, she worked as a librarian and assistant in a local military hospital. In the autumn of 1941, evacuees from besieged Leningrad arrived in the city of Kirov. At that time, Maria was a city council member. She settled two evacuee families in her apartment.

In December 1941, a ski marathon was organized in Kirov, in which 500 people participated (including Isakova).

She would finally win in 1944 a silver all-round medal at the Soviet Championships; gold medals would follow the next five years. She also won the prestigious Kirov prize five times from 1938 to 1951.

Isakova participated in the World Allround Championships three times, winning gold each time. This made her the first female speed skater to become world champion three times and, since her titles were consecutive, the first female speed skater to become world champion in three consecutive years.

In the 1980s, her stories about skiing were published in the children's magazine Murzilka. Isakova also wrote advice for children who want to become skiers - "Advice to a young skier".

She died in Moscow and was buried in the Vagankovo Cemetery.

== Awards ==
- Order of Lenin (April 1957).
- honorary citizen of Kirov (since 1986)

== Sport medals ==
An overview of medals won by Isakova at important championships she participated in, listing the years in which she won each:

Championships	Gold medal	Silver medal	Bronze medal
World Allround	1948; 1949; 1950	–	–
Soviet Allround	1945; 1946; 1947; 1948; 1949; 1951	1944; 1950	–

== World records ==
Over the course of her career, Isakova set one world record on the old Medeo natural ice rink at Alma-Ata:

Event	Result	Date	Venue
1,500 m	2:29.5	12 February 1951	Alma Ata - Old Medeo

== Personal records ==
To put these personal records in perspective, the WR column lists the official world records on the dates that Isakova skated her personal records.

Event	Result	Date	Venue	WR
500 m	47.7	8 January 1952	Alma-Ata - Old Medeo	46.4
1,000 m	1:37.2	16 February 1951	Alma-Ata - Old Medeo	1:38.8
1,500 m	2:29.5	12 February 1951	Alma-Ata - Old Medeo	2:36.7
3,000 m	5:21.7	23 January 1953	Alma-Ata - Old Medeo	5:21.3
5,000 m	9:32.0	1 February 1949	Moscow - TsDKA Stadion	9:28.3
