= Albina Tuzova =

Medal record

Representing Soviet Union

Women's speed skating

World Championships
Silver medal – second place	1961 Tønsberg	Allround
Bronze medal – third place	1962 Imatra	Allround

Albina Kochkina-Tuzova (Russian: Альбина Брониславовна Кочкина-Тузова; (1929, Cheremkhovo USSR – 1984, Chelyabinsk USSR))) was a former Soviet female speed skater. She won a silver medal at the World Allround Speed Skating Championships for Women in 1961, and a bronze medal in 1962.
