= Tanya Tuzova =

Russian artist (born 1993)

Tanya (Tatiana) Tuzova Таня Тузова
- Born: Tatiana Petrovna Tuzova; December 8, 1993 (age 31); Moscow, Russia
- Occupation(s): artiste, singer, model, designer
- Known for: Self-presentation as the "Russian" Barbie

Tanya Tuzova (Russian: Тáня (Татьяна) Тýзова, born December 8, 1993) is a Russian artiste, singer, model, designer and blogger. She is known for her deliberate resemblance to a Barbie doll, for which she received the nickname "Russian Barbie".

Born in Moscow into a family of musicians, Tuzova got her first doll at the age of 12. From that point onwards, she decided to become like Barbie, imitating her clothes and collecting a number of Barbie dolls. She has been married five times.

Tuzova received international coverage in 2019, after allegedly spending over £120,000 in total on her Barbie collection and resemblance, amassing a total of 1520 Barbie dolls. In 2023 the total amount of dolls reached to 12000.

== See also ==
- Rodrigo Alves - The man doll Ken
