= Lidia Selikhova =

Soviet speed skater

Personal information
- Born: Lidia Matveyevna Chernova; 19 March 1922 Bratskoye village, Poshekhonsky Uyezd, RSFSR
- Died: 7 February 2003 (aged 80)

Sport
- Sport: Speed skating
Medal record
Representing Soviet Union
Women's speed skating
World Championships
Gold medal – first place	1952 Kokkola	Allround
Gold medal – first place	1954 Östersund	Allround
Silver medal – second place	1948 Turku	Allround
Bronze medal – third place	1953 Lillehammer	Allround
Bronze medal – third place	1957 Imatra	Allround

Lidia Matveyevna Selikhova (Russian: Лидия Матвеевна Селихова; 19 March 1922 – 7 February 2003) was a Soviet female speed skater. She won a gold medal at the World Allround Speed Skating Championships for Women in 1952, and again a gold medal in 1954.
