= Valentina Stenina =

Soviet speed skater

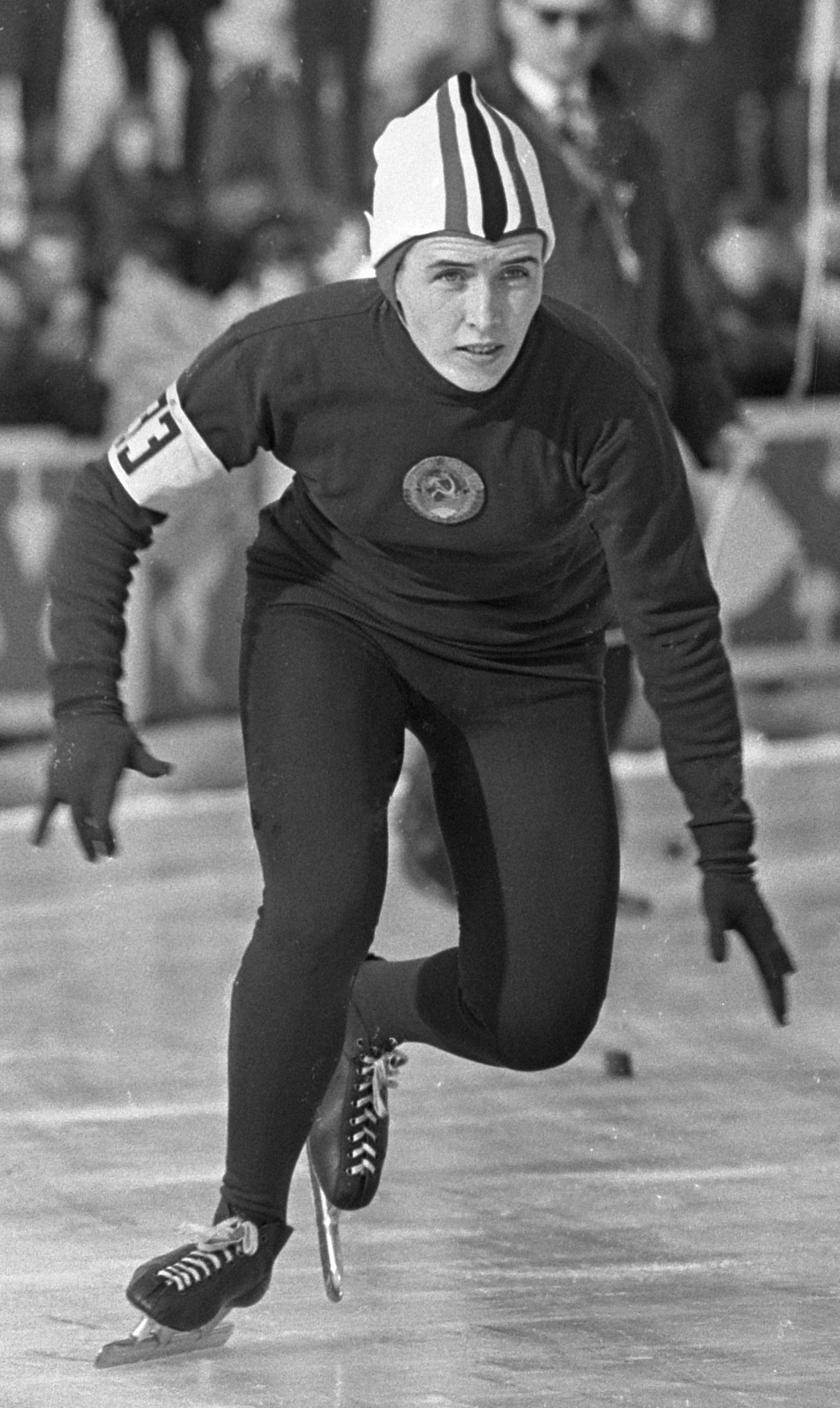

Personal information
- Born: 29 December 1934 (age 91) Babruysk, Soviet Union
- Height: 1.54 m (5 ft 1/2 in)
- Weight: 52 kg (115 lb)

Sport
- Country: Soviet Union
- Sport: Speed skating
Medal record
Representing Soviet Union
Women's speed skating
Olympic Games
Silver medal – second place	1960 Squaw Valley	3,000 m
Silver medal – second place	1964 Innsbruck	3,000 m
World Championships
Gold medal – first place	1960 Östersund	Allround
Gold medal – first place	1961 Tønsberg	Allround
Gold medal – first place	1966 Trondheim	Allround
Silver medal – second place	1959 Sverdlovsk	Allround
Silver medal – second place	1965 Oulu	Allround
Bronze medal – third place	1963 Karuizawa	Allround

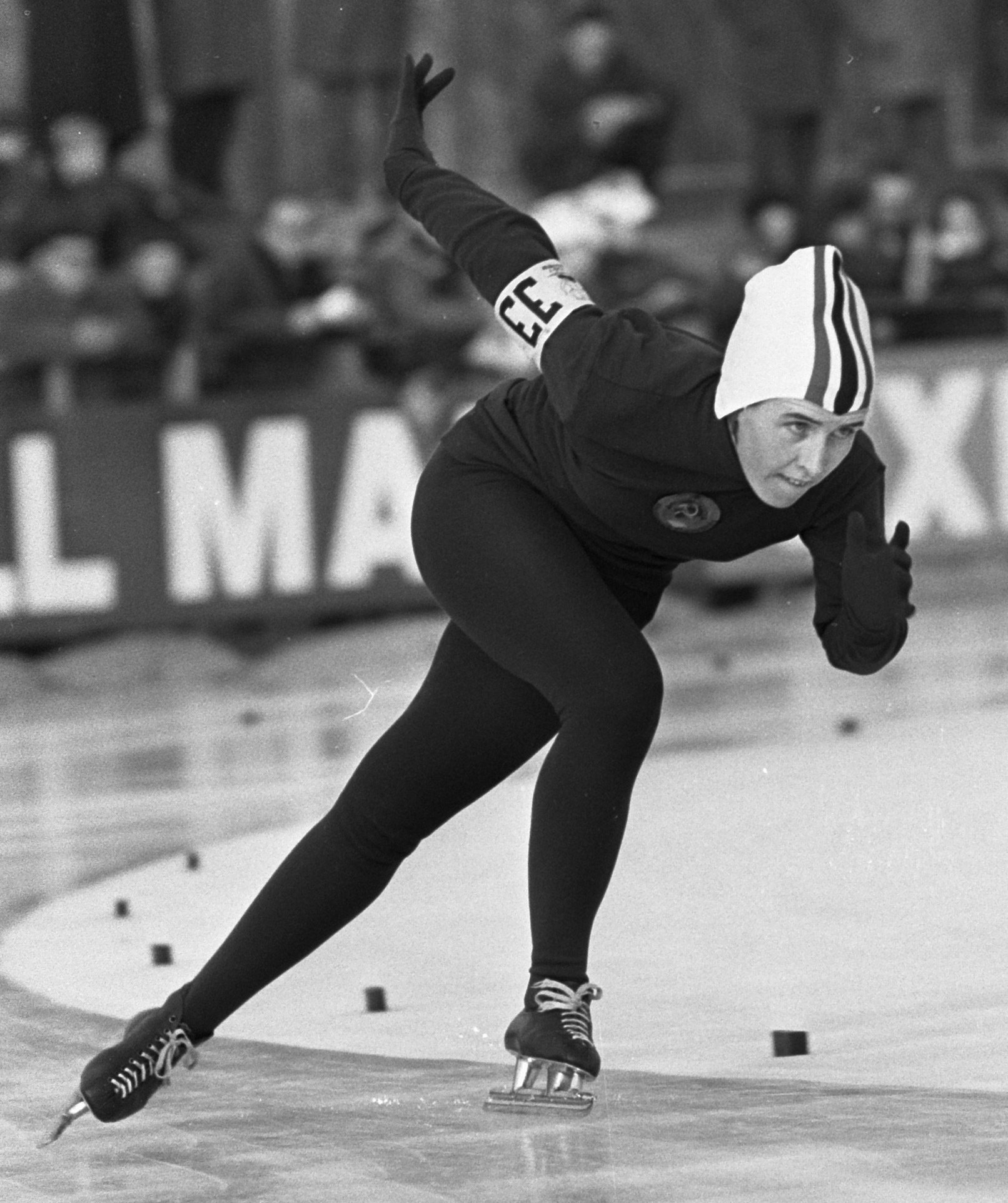
Valentina Stenina in 1967

Valentina Sergeyevna Stenina (Russian: Валентина Серге́евна Стенина; born 29 December 1934) is a former speed skater who competed for the Soviet Union.

Born Valentina Miloslavova in Babruysk (which is now part of Belarus), she fled to Sverdlovsk – taken by her mother – in 1941 because of World War II. In Sverdlovsk, she took up speed skating, training at VSS Trud, and met and married fellow skater Boris Stenin.

In 1959, Stenina participated in her first World Allround Championships, held in her home town of Sverdlovsk, and she won silver. The next year, 1960, was a very good year for Stenina: her husband Boris became Soviet Allround Champion, then Boris won silver at the European Allround Championships, then she herself became World Allround Champion, then Boris became World Allround Champion, and then at the 1960 Winter Olympics of Squaw Valley, she won silver on the 3,000 m behind Lidia Skoblikova, while Boris won bronze on the 1,500 m. In addition, Boris received the Oscar Mathisen Award that year. Valentina was not even considered for that award since women were not eligible to win it until 1987.

The following year (1961), Stenina successfully defended her World Champion title in a grand way with victories in three distances and a second place in the fourth. Later that month, she won the Soviet National Championships – a title she would win a total number of four times in her career (in 1961, 1965, 1966, and 1967). Stenina did not compete in 1962 but returned in 1963, winning bronze at the World Championships. At the 1964 Winter Olympics of Innsbruck, she won another silver medal on the 3,000 m, again behind Skoblikova. Another silver medal at the World Championships would follow in 1965 and she became World Champion for the third and final time in 1966, this time not winning any of the four distances.

For her accomplishments, Stenina was awarded the title of Honorable Citizen of Sverdlovsk in 1967 – the year she won her third consecutive (and fourth total) Soviet National Championships title. In 1968, she ended her career as a speed skater. Stenina currently lives in Yekaterinburg (which is the name that Sverdlovsk was changed back to in 1991). Her husband Boris died in 2001.

== Medals ==
An overview of medals won by Stenina at important championships she participated in, listing the years in which she won each:

Championships	Gold medal	Silver medal	Bronze medal
Winter Olympics	–	1960 (3,000 m); 1964 (3,000 m)	–
World Allround	1960; 1961; 1966	1959; 1965	1963
Soviet Allround	1961; 1965; 1966; 1967	1963	–

== Personal records ==
To put these personal records in perspective, the WR column lists the official world records on the dates that Stenina skated her personal records.

Event	Result	Date	Venue	WR
500 m	46.0	11 January 1964	Chelyabinsk	44.9
1,000 m	1:33.5	6 January 1964	Chelyabinsk	1:31.8
1,500 m	2:23.5	21 February 1963	Karuizawa	2:19.0
3,000 m	5:06.3	12 January 1964	Chelyabinsk	5:06.0
