= Inga Artamonova =

Soviet speed skater

Personal information
- Born: Inga Grigoryevna Artamonova; 29 August 1936 Moscow, Soviet Union
- Died: 4 January 1966 (aged 29) Moscow, Soviet Union
- Height: 1.77 m (5 ft 9 1/2 in)

Sport
- Country: Soviet Union
- Sport: Speed skating
Medal record
Representing Soviet Union
Women's speed skating
World Championships
Gold medal – first place	1957 Imatra	Allround
Gold medal – first place	1958 Kristinehamn	Allround
Gold medal – first place	1962 Imatra	Allround
Gold medal – first place	1965 Oulu	Allround
Silver medal – second place	1963 Karuizawa	Allround
Silver medal – second place	1964 Kristinehamn	Allround

Inga Grigoryevna Artamonova (Russian: И́нга Григо́рьевна Артамо́нова; 29 August 1936 – 4 January 1966) was a Soviet speed skater, the first four-time Allround World Champion in women's speed skating history. After her marriage in 1959 to fellow speed skater Gennady Voronin (Russian: Геннадий Воронин), she was also known as Inga Voronina (Russian: Инга Воронина).

At the age of twelve, Inga Artamonova began rowing, becoming Master of Sports of the USSR and winning in the USSR Junior Championships. Later, she began speed skating. Skating for Dynamo in Moscow, Artamonova won the World Allround Speed Skating Championships in 1957, 1958, and 1962, and was second in 1963 and 1964 before capturing her fourth World Championships title in 1965. She also was five times Soviet Allround Champion and 26 times Soviet Champion in individual distances. Over the course of her career, Artamonova set of a number of world records, including four in two days in 1962 when she set new marks on the 500 m, 1,500 m, and 3,000 m, which also resulted in a new world record on the mini combination (500 m – 1,000 m – 1,500 m – 3,000 m; the distances then in use at the World Allround Championships for women). She was also eight times winner of the prestigious Kirov Prize, winning all editions between 1958 and 1965.

Her husband Gennady Voronin, who could not deal with all Artamonova's successes, had by this time become an alcoholic and seen his own speed skating career vanish. Murdered by Gennady at the age of 29, Artamonova was interred in the Vagankovskoye Cemetery in Moscow. She is the author of the book "I Am Learning to Go on the Ground" (Russian: «Я учусь ходить по земле»), which was published after her death, in 1967.

== Medals ==
An overview of medals won by Artamonova at important championships she participated in, listing the years in which she won each:

Championships	Gold medal	Silver medal	Bronze medal
World Allround	1957; 1958; 1962; 1965	1963; 1964	–
Soviet Allround	1956; 1958; 1962; 1963; 1964	1957; 1959; 1961; 1965	–

== World records ==
Over the course of her career, Artamonova skated 5 world records:

Distance	Result	Date	Location
Mini combination	206.016	6 February 1956	Sverdlovsk
500 m	44.9	27 January 1962	Medeo
1,500 m	2:19.0	27 January 1962	Medeo
3,000 m	5:06.0	28 January 1962	Medeo
Mini combination	189.033	28 January 1962	Medeo
