= Verné Lesche =

Finnish speed skater (1917–2002)

Medal record

Representing Finland

Women's speed skating

World Championships
Silver medal – second place	1934 Oslo	Allround
Silver medal – second place	1936 Stockholm	Allround
Bronze medal – third place	1937 Davos	Allround
Silver medal – second place	1938 Oslo	Allround
Gold medal – first place	1939 Tampere	Allround
Gold medal – first place	1947 Drammen	Allround

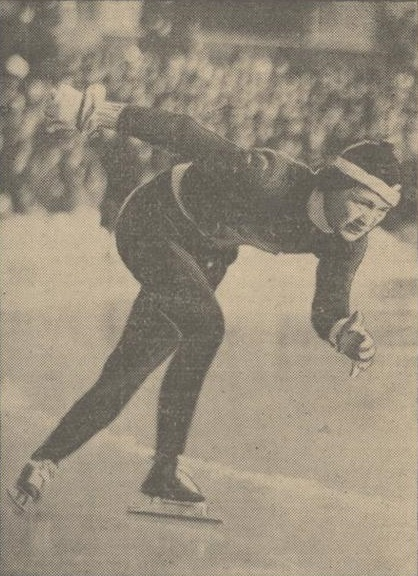
Lesche in 1934

Verné Lesche, married Vanberg (11 October 1917 – 21 April 2002) was a speed skater from Finland who twice won the World Allround Championships. Lesche was born in Helsinki, Finland, and already skated a world record in 1933 when she was only 15 years old. Her successes continued and she won the world title for the first time in 1939, when Tampere hosted the World Allround Championships. She won it for the second time in Drammen in 1947, making her the only speed skater in history to have won a medal at the World Allround Championships both before and after World War II. At those 1947 World Championships, Lesche won all four distances and the difference in samalog points with the silver medallist, Norwegian skater Else Marie Christiansen, was 20.923 points – the largest difference in history between numbers one and two at an international championship. Of this 20.923 point difference, 6.983 points (equal to 41.9 seconds) were the difference between Lesche and Christiansen on the 3,000 m, while Lesche recorded a 9.690 point difference over Christiansen on the 5,000 m by skating that distance 1 minute and 36.9 seconds faster than the Norwegian.

A very rare event took place at the Finnish Allround Championships in 1948. Lesche won one distance and finished second on the other three, and her resulting samalog score was better than that of any of her opponents. However, Eevi Huttunen had finished second on one distance while winning the other three, and the rule at the time was that a competitor would automatically be the winner by finishing first on at least three distances. So despite having the best samalog score, Lesche won only silver. The most famous occurrence of this application of the three distance wins rule was at the 1983 World Allround Championships, when Rolf Falk-Larssen became World Champion despite silver medallist Tomas Gustafson having a better samalog score.

Lesche's last international appearance was at the 1949 World Allround Championships where she finished fifth overall and set a new world record on the 5,000 m. Lesche-Vanberg died in Kongsberg, Norway, at the age of 84.

Her son, Marcel Lesche Vanberg, was active in speed skating first as a speed skater himself and later as a starter. He was one of the official starters at the olympics at the 2006 Winter Olympics in speed skating.

== Medals ==
An overview of medals won by Lesche at important championships she participated in, listing the years in which she won each:

Championships	Gold medal	Silver medal	Bronze medal
World Allround	1939; 1947	(1934); 1936; 1938	1937
Finnish Allround	1933; 1934; 1935; 1936; 1937; 1938; 1939; 1941; 1943; 1944; 1945; 1949	1948	

Note that the World Allround Championships of 1934 were unofficial.

== World records ==
Over the course of her career, Lesche skated four world records:

Event	Result	Date	Venue
1,500 m	2:49.0	26 February 1933	Helsinki
1,000 m	1:45.7	11 February 1934	Oslo
5,000 m	10:15.3	2 February 1936	Stockholm
5,000 m	9:26.8	13 February 1949	Kongsberg

== Personal records ==
To put these personal records in perspective, the WR column lists the official world records on the dates that Lesche skated her personal records.

Event	Result	Date	Venue	WR
500 m	50.5	12 February 1934	Oslo	51.3
1,000 m	1:44.9	31 January 1937	Davos	1:42.3
1,500 m	2:43.2	17 February 1935	Helsinki	2:40.0
3,000 m	5:32.5	12 February 1949	Kongsberg	5:29.1
5,000 m	9:26.8	13 February 1949	Kongsberg	9:28.3
Old combination	217.347	31 January 1937	Davos	none
Small combination	257.344	13 March 1932	Helsinki	none

Note that Lesche's personal record on the 500 m was not a world record because Synnøve Lie skated 50.3 at the same tournament. Also note that the old combination was not an official world record event, as governed by the International Skating Union, until 1949, and that the small combination was not an official world record event until 1983.

Lesche has an Adelskalender score of 217.896 points.
