= Gayle Gordon =

Canadian speed skater

Personal information
- Born: 27 August 1955 (age 70) Winnipeg, Manitoba, Canada

Sport
- Sport: Speed skating

Gayle Gordon (born 27 August 1955) is a Canadian speed skater. She competed at the 1972 Winter Olympics and the 1976 Winter Olympics.
