= Rimma Zhukova =

Rimma Mikhailovna Zhukova (Russian: Римма Михайловна Жукова, 14 March 1925, Tyumen – 5 August 1999, Moscow) was a Soviet speed skater.

Rimma Zhukova competed for the Soviet Union and after having become Soviet Allround Champion three times and having won the prestigious Kirov prize four times, she became World Allround Champion in 1955. Zhukova was one of the Soviet women who dominated skating for almost 20 years starting in 1948. Since all three medals at every one of the twelve World Championships between 1953 and 1964 were won by Soviet women, the strongest competition Zhukova experienced came from other Soviet skaters.

== Medals ==
An overview of medals won by Zhukova at important championships she participated in, listing the years in which she won each:

Championships	Gold medal	Silver medal	Bronze medal
World Allround	1955	1953; 1954; 1956	1949; 1950
Soviet Allround	1952; 1953; 1954	1951	1949; 1955; 1957

== World records ==
Over the course of her career, Zhukova skated eight world records:

Event	Result	Date	Venue
1500 m	2:36.7	17 March 1950	Kirov
5000 m	9:22.3	17 March 1950	Kirov
3000 m	5:21.3	8 January 1952	Medeu
1000 m	1:36.6	22 January 1952	Medeu
Old combination	208.750	22 January 1952	Medeu
3000 m	5:13.8	23 January 1953	Medeu
5000 m	9:01.6	24 January 1953	Medeu
Old combination	204.010	24 January 1953	Medeu

== Personal records ==
To put these personal records in perspective, the WR column lists the official world records on the dates that Zhukova skated her personal records.

Event	Result	Date	Venue	WR
500 m	46.6	24 January 1952	Medeu	46.4
1000 m	1:34.4	12 January 1955	Medeu	1:36.4
1500 m	2:27.7	11 January 1955	Medeu	2:25.5
3000 m	5:13.8	23 January 1953	Medeu	5:21.3
5000 m	9:01.6	24 January 1953	Medeu	9:10.7

Note that Zhukova's personal record on the 1000 m was not a world record because Tamara Rylova skated 1:33.4 at the same tournament.

Zukova has an Adelskalender score of 193.050 points.
