= Nancy Swider-Peltz =

American speed skater

Nancy Louise Swider-Peltz (born August 20, 1956, in Chicago, Illinois) is an American former Olympic speed skater (1976, 1980, 1984, 1988) who held the world record in the 3,000 meters in 1976. She was the first U.S. Olympian to compete in four different Winter Olympics. She was elected to the National Speed Skating Hall of Fame.

She is a graduate of Maine South High School in Park Ridge, Illinois.

Swider-Peltz coaches her daughter, Nancy Jr., who competed for the US at the 2010 Winter Olympics.

She is also a graduate of Wheaton College, Wheaton, Illinois. She now coaches at Park Ridge Speedskating Club.
