= Sarah Docter =

American speed skater (born 1964)

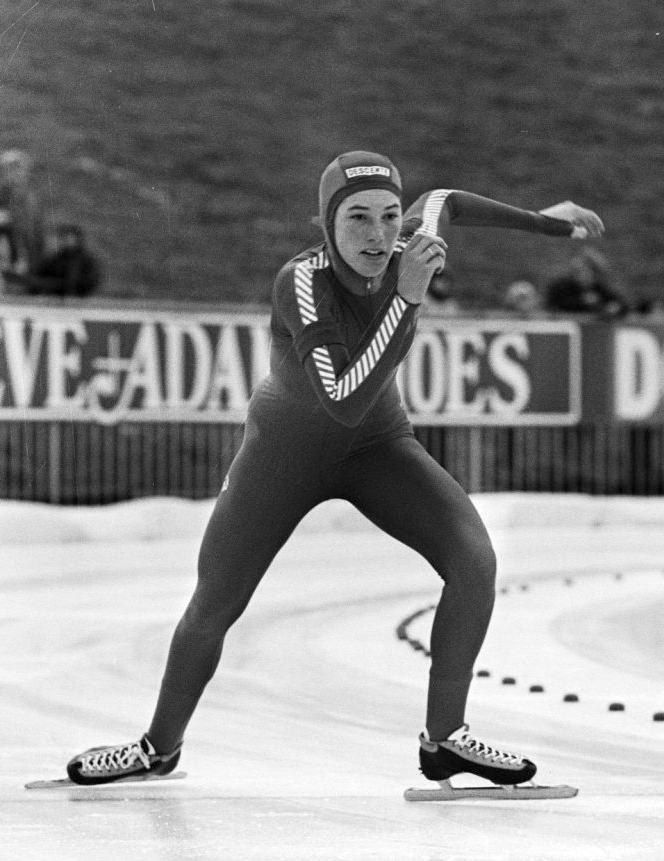
- Sarah Docter in 1980

Personal information
- Born: May 10, 1964 (age 62) Madison, Wisconsin, United States
- Height: 1.67 m (5 ft 6 in)
- Weight: 57 kg (126 lb)

Sport
- Sport: Speed skating
- Club: Madison Speed Skating Club

Sarah Beth Docter (born May 10, 1964) is a retired American short track and long track speed skater. She won several U.S. national championships in the 1970s, and in 1978 she won U.S. national titles in both short track and long track. That year she went on to the world short-track championships, in which she won the 1500 m and 3000 m events and the overall competition. In 1980, she competed in all speed skating events at the 1980 Winter Olympics in Lake Placid, New York, with the best achievement of tenth place in the 3000 m. In addition to skating career, she is also a cyclist, and once took part in the World Cycling Championships.

After retirement she moved to Florida, where she lives with her family. She got married and changed her last name to Williams. Her sister Mary is also an Olympic speed skater, and her daughter is professional cyclist Lily Williams.

Personal bests:

- 500 m – 42.69 (1982)
- 1000 m – 1:23.84 (1982)
- 1500 m – 2:08.37 (1982)
- 3000 m – 4:28.05 (1982)
