= Galina Stepanskaya =

Soviet speed skater (born 1949)

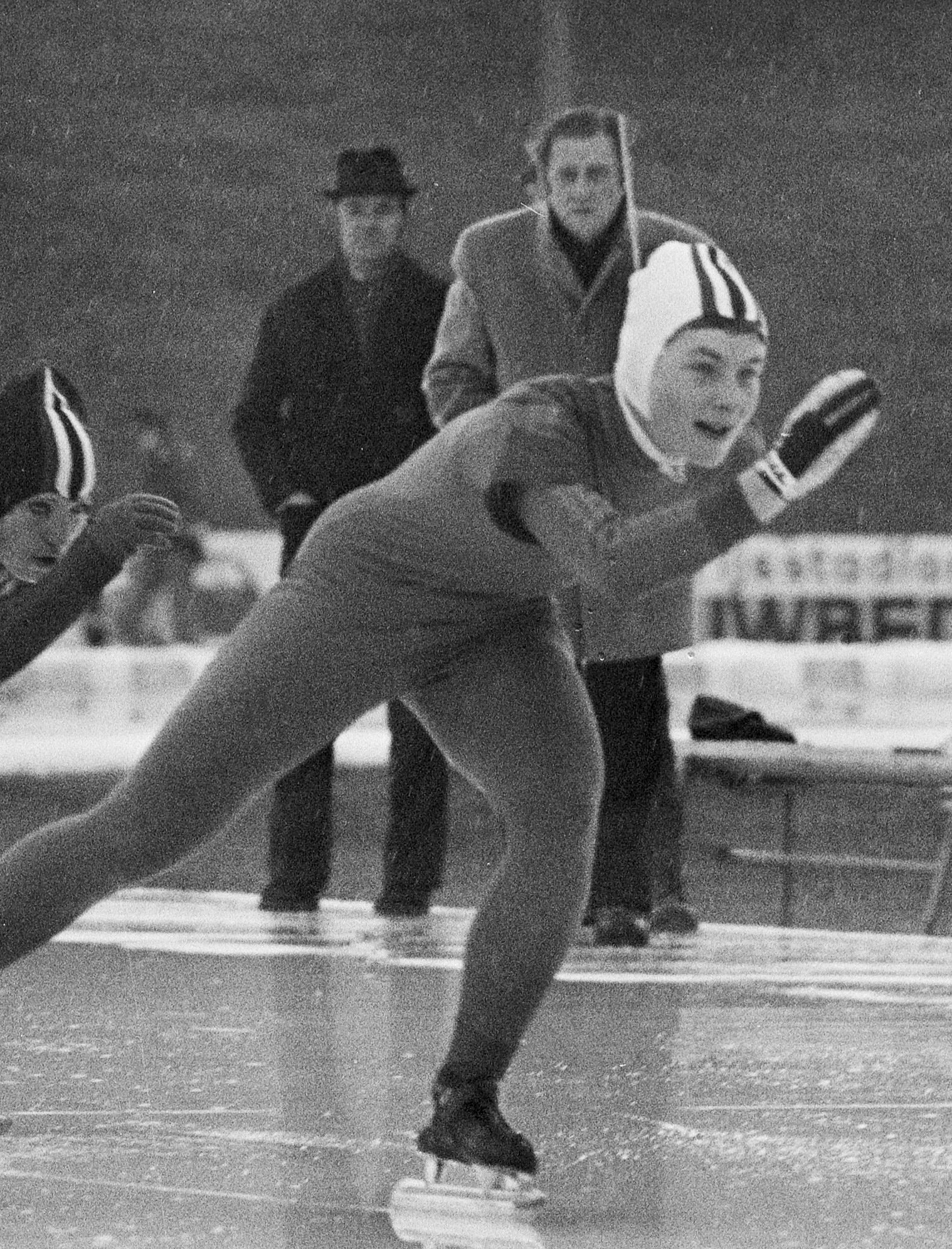
- Galina Stepanskaya in 1976

Personal information
- Born: 27 January 1949 (age 77) Leningrad, Russian SFSR, Soviet Union
- Height: 1.69 m (5 ft 7 in)

Sport
- Sport: Speed skating
- Club: Trud Leningrad
Medal record
Representing Soviet Union
Olympic Games
Gold medal – first place	1976 Innsbruck	1,500 m
World Championships
Silver medal – second place	1977 Keystone	Allround
Silver medal – second place	1978 Helsinki	Allround

Galina Andreyevna Stepanskaya (Russian: Галина Андреевна Степанская; born 27 January 1949) is a former speed skater who competed for the Soviet Union. She won the 1,500 m event at the 1976 Winter Olympics in Innsbruck. She was Soviet Allround Champion in 1976 and 1977 and won silver twice at the World Allround Championships, in 1977 and 1978. In 2009, she was awarded the Order of the Badge of Honour.

== World records ==
During her career, Stepanskaya set three world records:

Distance	Result	Date	Location
3,000 m	4:40.59	16 March 1976	Medeo
3,000 m	4:31.00	23 March 1976	Medeo
Mini combination	173.810	23 March 1976	Medeo

== Personal records ==
Distance	Result	Date	Location
500 m	42.44	3 April 1978	Medeo
1,000 m	1:24.06	23 March 1976	Medeo
1,500 m	2:10.12	22 March 1976	Medeo
3,000 m	4:31.00	23 March 1976	Medeo
