= Nina Statkevich =

Soviet speed skater

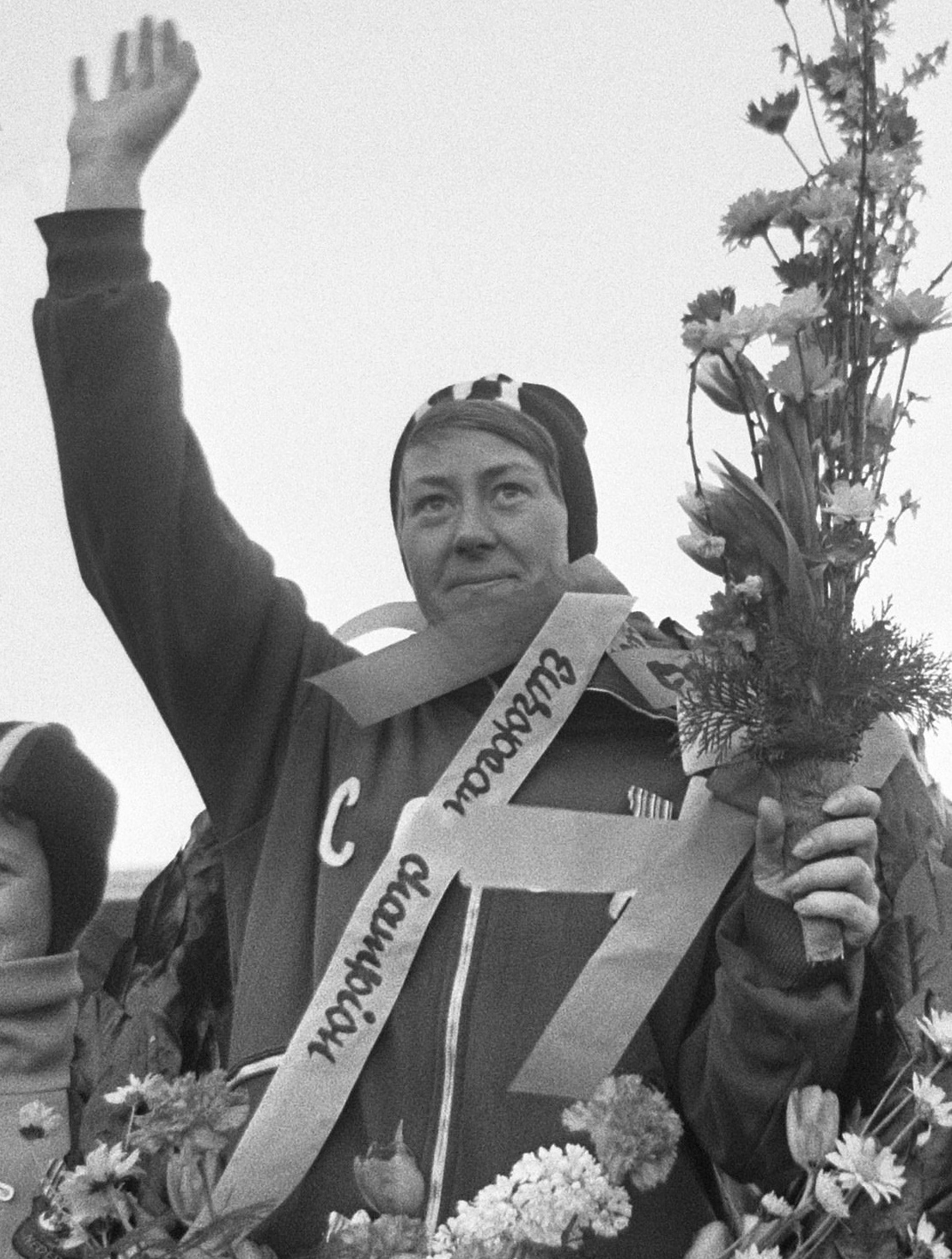
- Nina Statkevich in 1970

Personal information
- Born: 16 February 1944 (age 82) Leningrad, Soviet Union
- Height: 1.65 m (5 ft 5 in)
- Weight: 61 kg (134 lb)

Sport
- Sport: Speed skating
- Club: VSS Trud Leningrad
Medal record
Representing Soviet Union
World Championships
Gold medal – first place	1971 Helsinki	Allround
Silver medal – second place	1970 West-Allis	Sprint
Bronze medal – third place	1974 Heerenveen	Allround
European Championships
Gold medal – first place	1970 Heerenveen	Allround
Gold medal – first place	1971 Leningrad	Allround
Silver medal – second place	1972 Inzell	Allround
Silver medal – second place	1974 Medeo	Allround
Bronze medal – third place	1973 Brandbu	Allround

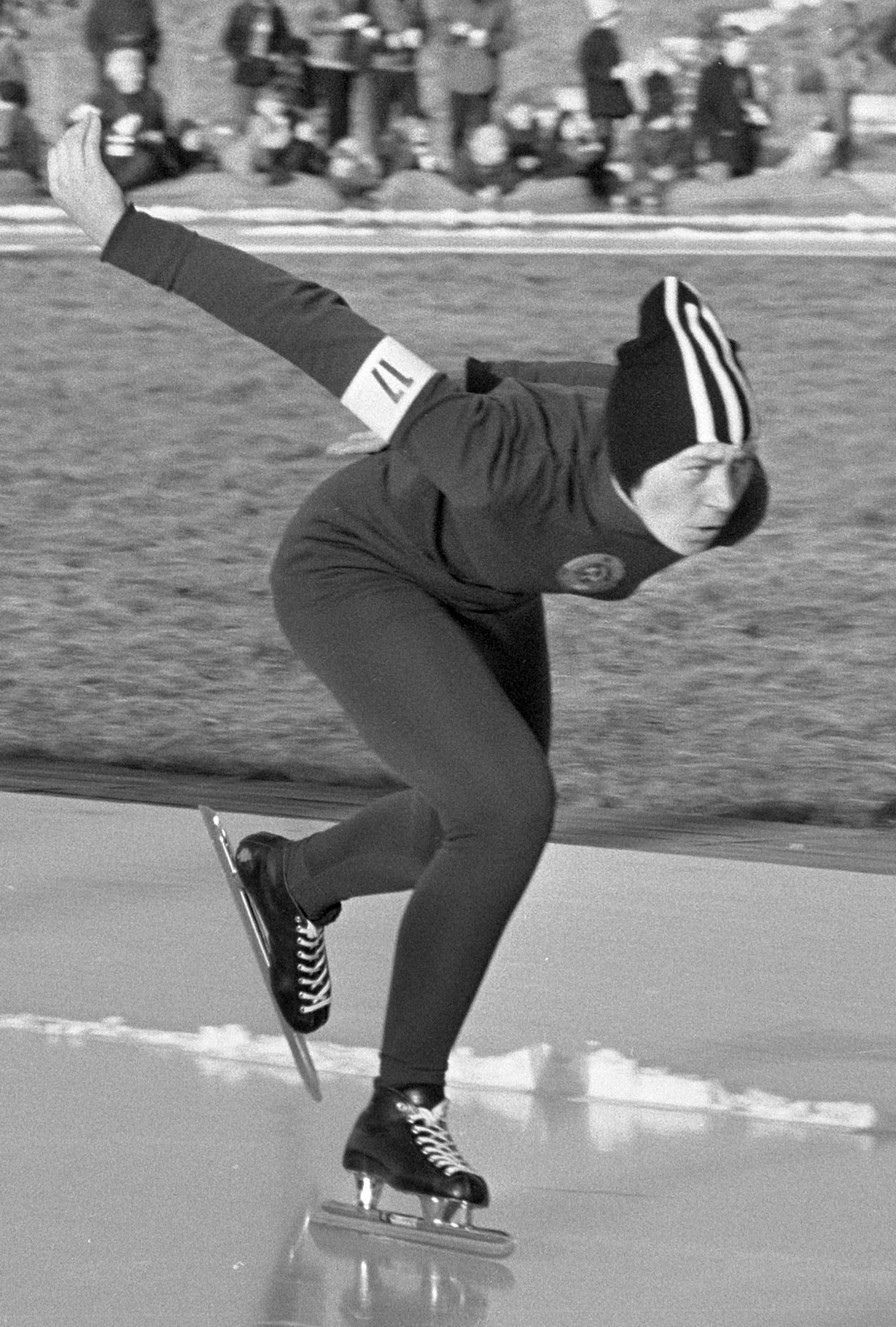
Statkevich at the 1970 European championships

Nina Andreyevna Statkevich (Russian: Нина Андреевна Статкевич; born 16 February 1944) is a former speed skater who competed for the Soviet Union.

Nina Statkevich trained at VSS Trud in Leningrad. She won many titles – she was World Allround Champion, European Allround Champion twice, Soviet Allround Champion four times, and Soviet Sprint Champion. She also competed at the Winter Olympics, but never won an Olympic medal, a fifth place at the 1972 Olympics being her best result (on both 1000 m and 3000 m).

== Medals ==
An overview of medals won by Statkevich during important championships she participated in, listing the years in which she won each:

Championships	Gold medal	Silver medal	Bronze medal
Winter Olympics			
World Allround	1971		1974
World Sprint		1970	
European Allround	1970; 1971	1972; 1974	1973
Soviet Allround	1970; 1971; 1972; 1974	1973	
Soviet Sprint	1970		1973

== World records ==
Over the course of her career, Statkevich skated 2 world records on the then still natural ice of Medeo:

Distance	Result	Date	Location
1,500 m	2:17.8	17 January 1970	Medeo
Mini combination	184.053	18 January 1970	Medeo

Personal bests:

- 500 m – 43.32 (1970)
- 1000 m – 1:28.1 (1973)
- 1500 m – 2:16.48 (1973)
- 3000 m – 4:43.0 (1973)
- 5000 m – 8:36.5 (1976)
