= Sylvia Filipsson =

Swedish speed skater

Personal information
- Nationality: Swedish
- Born: 22 May 1953 (age 71); Katrineholm, Sweden

Sport
- Country: Sweden
- Sport: speed skating
- Club: Katrineholms AIK

Sylvia Filipsson (later Hellström, born 22 May 1953) is a former ice speed skater from Sweden. She was part of the Swedish Olympic team in 1972, 1976 and 1980 with the best result of fifth place over 1500 m in 1980. She competed in 10 world allround championships, and placed fourth in 1980, sixth in 1976, seventh in 1978 and eighth in 1979.

Her brother Tord Filipsson is a former Olympic cyclist.
