= Bjørg Eva Jensen =

Norwegian speed skater (born 1960)

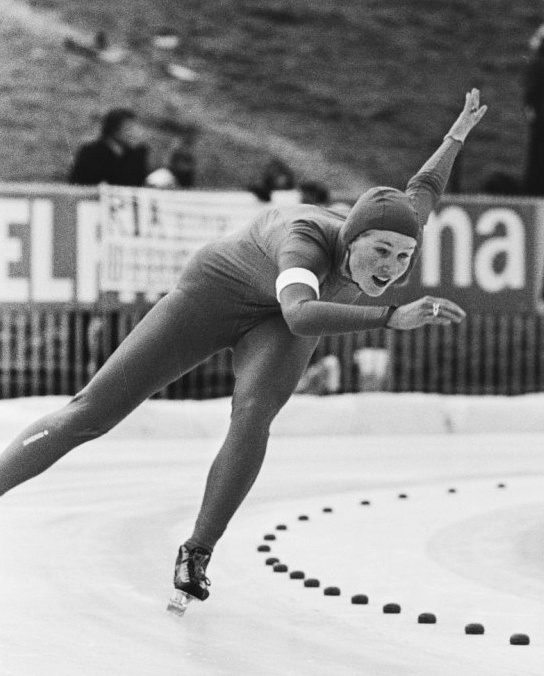
- Bjørg Eva Jensen during the World Junior Championships in Assen, Netherlands in January 1980

Personal information
- Born: 15 February 1960 (age 66) Larvik, Norway
- Height: 1.75 m (5 ft 9 in)
- Weight: 66 kg (146 lb)

Sport
- Sport: Speed skating
- Club: IF Fram, Larvik
Medal record
Representing Norway
Olympic Games
Gold medal – first place	1980 Lake Placid	3,000 m
World Allround Championships
Bronze medal – third place	1980 Hamar	Allround
World Junior Championships
Silver medal – second place	1978 Montreal	Junior
Silver medal – second place	1979 Grenoble	Junior
Bronze medal – third place	1977 Inzell	Junior
Gold medal – first place	1980 Assen	Junior

Bjørg Eva Jensen (born 15 February 1960) is a speed skater from Norway. She had her best year in 1980, when she became junior world allround champion, finished third at the senior allround world championships, and won the 3,000 m event at the 1980 Winter Olympics in Lake Placid.

After that she had very few international successes, but she won 15 Norwegian titles, including 8 allround, 4 sprint, and 3 single distance titles. In 2002, aged 42, she won silver on the 5,000 m at the Norwegian Single Distance Championships. She later participated in the 2006 Norwegian Single Distance Championships, aged 45, finishing 12th on the 1,500 m and 7th on the 3,000 m.

Jensen is also a successful bicycle racer and won the Norwegian Championships in both time trial and individual pursuit in 1979. She was awarded the 1980 Egebergs Ærespris for her achievements in speed skating and cycling and was elected Norwegian Sportsperson of the Year that same year.

National titles

Championships	Gold medal	Silver medal	Bronze medal
Norwegian Allround	1979; 1980; 1981; 1982; 1983; 1986; 1987; 1988	–	–
Norwegian Sprint	1979; 1981; 1982; 1983	1977; 1978	1976
Norwegian Single Distance	1987 (3,000 m); 1988 (3,000 m); 1988 (5,000 m)	1988 (1,500 m); 2002 (5,000 m)	–

Personal records

To put these personal records in perspective, the last column (WR) lists the official world records on the dates that Jensen skated her personal records.

Distance	Time	Date	Location	WR
500 m	42.40	3 April 1978	Medeo	40.68
1,000 m	1:24.30	10 March 1979	Larvik	1:23.46
1,500 m	2:08.61	15 January 1984	Medeo	2:04.04
3,000 m	4:29.28	14 February 1982	Inzell	4:21.70
5,000 m	7:50.4	27 December 1982	Larvik	none
10,000 m	16:49.82	7 March 1985	Savalen	none
Small combination	179.076	15 January 1984	Medeo	177.669

Jensen has an Adelskalender score of 177.190 points. Her highest ranking on the Adelskalender was a 3rd place.

Awards
Preceded by Eystein Weltzien	Egebergs Ærespris; 1980	Succeeded by Cato Zahl Pedersen
Preceded by Grete Waitz	Norwegian Sportsperson of the Year; 1980	Succeeded by Tom Lund
