= United States at the 1976 Winter Olympics =

- Flag of the United States
- IOC code: USA
- NOC: United States Olympic Committee

in Innsbruck
- Competitors: 106 (76 men, 30 women) in 6 sports
- Flag bearer: Cindy Nelson (alpine skiing)
- Medals Ranked 3rd: Gold 3 Silver 3 Bronze 4 Total 10

Winter Olympics appearances (overview)
- 1924; 1928; 1932; 1936; 1948; 1952; 1956; 1960; 1964; 1968; 1972; 1976; 1980; 1984; 1988; 1992; 1994; 1998; 2002; 2006; 2010; 2014; 2018; 2022; 2026

The United States competed at the 1976 Winter Olympics in Innsbruck, Austria.

== Medalists ==
The following U.S. competitors won medals at the games. In the by discipline sections below, medalists' names are bolded.

Medal	Name	Sport	Event	Date
Gold	Sheila Young	Speed skating	Women's 500 meters	February 6
Gold	Peter Mueller	Speed skating	Men's 1000 meters	February 12
Gold	Dorothy Hamill	Figure skating	Women's singles	February 13
Silver	Bill Koch	Cross-country skiing	Men's 30 kilometers	February 5
Silver	Sheila Young	Speed skating	Women's 1500 meters	February 5
Silver	Leah Poulos	Speed skating	Women's 1000 meters	February 7
Bronze	Sheila Young	Speed skating	Women's 1000 meters	February 7
Bronze	Cindy Nelson	Alpine skiing	Women's downhill	February 8
Bronze	James Millns; Colleen O'Connor	Figure skating	Ice dancing	February 9
Bronze	Dan Immerfall	Speed skating	Men's 500 meters	February 10

Medals by sport
Sport	1st place, gold medalist(s)	2nd place, silver medalist(s)	3rd place, bronze medalist(s)	Total
Speed skating	2	2	2	**6**
Figure skating	1	0	1	**2**
Cross-country skiing	0	1	0	**1**
Alpine skiing	0	0	1	**1**
**Total**	**3**	**3**	**4**	**10**

Multiple medalists
Name	Sport	1st place, gold medalist(s)	2nd place, silver medalist(s)	3rd place, bronze medalist(s)	Total
Sheila Young	Speed skating	1	1	1	**3**

== Alpine skiing ==
Men

Athlete	Event	Run 1		Run 2		Total	
Athlete	Event	Time	Rank	Time	Rank	Time	Rank
Karl Anderson	Downhill	—N/a				1:49.08	24
Greg Jones	Downhill	—N/a				1:47.84	11
Andy Mill	Downhill	—N/a				1:47.06	6
Pete Patterson	Downhill	—N/a				1:47.94	13
Cary Adgate	Giant slalom	1:48.64	23	1:47.77	21	3:36.41	21
Greg Jones	Giant slalom	1:48.09	16	1:43.68	9	3:31.77	9
Phil Mahre	Giant slalom	1:45.58	4	1:42.62	5	3:28.20	5
Steve Mahre	Giant slalom	1:47.80	14	1:45.96	12	3:33.76	13
Cary Adgate	Slalom	1:03.06	14	1:06.47	13	2:09.53	13
Geoff Bruce	Slalom	DNF					
Greg Jones	Slalom	1:05.05	24	1:07.66	19	2:12.71	19
Phil Mahre	Slalom	1:04.80	22	1:06.97	17	2:11.77	18

Women

Athlete	Event	Run 1		Run 2		Total	
Athlete	Event	Time	Rank	Time	Rank	Time	Rank
Cindy Nelson	Downhill	—N/a				1:47.50	3rd place, bronze medalist(s)
Susan Patterson	Downhill	—N/a				1:49.37	14
Leslie Smith	Downhill	—N/a				1:52.98	26
Lindy Cochran	Giant slalom	—N/a				1:31.33	12
Cindy Nelson	Giant slalom	—N/a				1:32.02	21
Mary Seaton	Giant slalom	—N/a				1:31.58	17
Leslie Smith	Giant slalom	—N/a				1:34.54	28
Lindy Cochran	Slalom	47.96	7	45.28	4	1:33.24	6
Abbi Fisher	Slalom	50.34	21	DNF			
Cindy Nelson	Slalom	49.52	16	47.81	13	1:37.33	13
Mary Seaton	Slalom	49.04	12	46.83	9	1:35.87	10

== Biathlon ==
Athlete	Event	Time	Misses	Rank
Peter Dascoulias	Individual	DNF		
Martin Hagen	Individual	1:28:49.20	8	47
Lyle Nelson	Individual	1:25:27.50	10	35
Peter Dascoulias; Dennis Donahue; John Morton; Lyle Nelson	Relay	2:10:17.72	4	11

== Bobsleigh ==
Athlete	Event	Run 1		Run 2		Run 3		Run 4		Total	
Athlete	Event	Time	Rank	Time	Rank	Time	Rank	Time	Rank	Time	Rank
Jimmy Morgan; Thomas Becker	Two-man	57.68	15	57.63	14	57.66	13	57.79	13	3:50.76	14
Brent Rushlaw; John Proctor	Two-man	58.07	20	58.27	20	57.79	15	57.89	14	3:52.02	19
William Hollrock; Earl Frisbie; Frederick Fritsch; Phil Duprey	Four-man	56.61	19	56.86	18	57.89	21	58.35	20	3:49.71	19
Jimmy Morgan; Peter Brennan; John Proctor; Thomas Becker	Four-man	56.09	15	56.08	14	56.96	15	57.59	15	3:46.72	15

== Cross-country skiing ==
Men

Athlete	Event	Time	Rank
Tim Caldwell	15 km	47:33.59	37
Bill Koch	15 km	45:32.22	6
Doug Peterson	15 km	49:00.98	54
Ronny Yeager	15 km	48:58.16	52
Bela Bodnar	30 km	1:43:10.73	59
Tim Caldwell	30 km	1:35:57.97	27
Chris Haines	30 km	1:40:58.43	52
Bill Koch	30 km	1:30:57.84	2nd place, silver medalist(s)
Tim Caldwell	50 km	DNF	
Stan Dunklee	50 km	2:51:26.28	36
Chris Haines	50 km	DNF	
Bill Koch	50 km	2:44:34.69	13
Tim Caldwell; Bill Koch; Doug Peterson; Ronny Yeager	4 × 10 km relay	2:11:41.35	6

Women

Athlete	Event	Time	Rank
Jana Hlavaty	5 km	18:21.21	35
Terry Porter	5 km	19:36.93	39
Martha Rockwell	5 km	17:33.07	28
Lynn von der Heide-Spencer-Galanes	5 km	DNF	
Twila Hinkle	10 km	36:35.49	42
Jana Hlavaty	10 km	34:48.88	37
Margie Mahoney	10 km	37:07.18	43
Martha Rockwell	10 km	34:21.34	36
Twila Hinkle; Jana Hlavaty; Terry Porter; Martha Rockwell	4 × 5 km relay	1:17:58.18	9

== Figure skating ==
Individual

Athlete	Event	CF	SP	FS	Total		
Athlete	Event	Rank	Rank	Rank	Points	Places	Rank
Terry Kubicka	Men's singles	11	10	3	183.30	56	7
David Santee	Men's singles	5	4	6	184.28	49	6
Wendy Burge	Ladies' singles	6	8	9	182.14	63	6
Linda Fratianne	Ladies' singles	9	6	6	181.86	67	8
Dorothy Hamill	Ladies' singles	2	1	1	193.80	9	1st place, gold medalist(s)

Mixed

Athlete	Event	SP / CD	FS / FD	Total		
Athlete	Event	Rank	Rank	Points	Places	Rank
Tai Babilonia; Randy Gardner	Pairs	5	4	134.24	36	5
Alice Cook; William Fauver	Pairs	11	13	119.36	106	12
Judi Genovesi; Kent Weigle	Ice dancing	15	16	168.26	134	15
Susan Kelley; Andrew Stroukoff	Ice dancing	18	15	165.12	147	17
Colleen O'Connor; Jim Millns	Ice dancing	3	3	202.64	27	3rd place, bronze medalist(s)

== Ice hockey ==
Summary

Team	Event	First round	Consolation game	Medal round					
Team	Event	Opposition Score	Opposition Score	Opposition Score	Opposition Score	Opposition Score	Opposition Score	Opposition Score	Rank
United States men	Men's tournament	Yugoslavia; **W** 8–4	Bye	Soviet Union; **L** 2–6	Czechoslovakia; **L** 0–5	Finland; **W** 5–4	Poland; **W** 7–2	West Germany; **L** 1–4	5

Roster
- Steve Alley
- Dan Bolduc
- Blane Comstock
- Bob Dobek
- Rob Harris
- Jeff Hymanson
- Paul Jensen
- Steve Jensen
- Dick Lamby
- Bob Lundeen
- Bob Miller
- Doug Ross
- Gary Ross
- Buzz Schneider
- Steve Sertich
- John Taft
- Ted Thorndike
- Jim Warden

First round
Winners (in bold) entered the Medal Round. Other teams played a consolation round for 7th-12th places.

Team 1	Score	Team 2
**United States**	8–4	Yugoslavia

Medal round

Rank		Pld	W	L	T	GF	GA	Pts
1	Soviet Union	5	5	0	0	40	11	10
2	Czechoslovakia	5	3	2	0	17	10	6
3	West Germany	5	2	3	0	21	24	4
4	Finland	5	2	3	0	19	18	4
5	United States	5	2	3	0	15	21	4
6	Poland	5	1	4	0	9	37	2

- USSR 6–2 USA
- Czechoslovakia 5–0 USA
- USA 5–4 Finland
- USA 7–2 Poland
- West Germany 4–1 USA

== Luge ==
Men

Athlete	Event	Run 1		Run 2		Run 3		Run 4		Total	
Athlete	Event	Time	Rank	Time	Rank	Time	Rank	Time	Rank	Time	Rank
Richard Cavanaugh	Singles	56.186	28	55.669	33	54.572	25	54.930	26	3:41.357	25
James Murray	Singles	56.269	31	55.554	31	55.142	30	55.187	28	3:42.152	26
Terry O'Brien	Singles	56.366	33	55.647	32	55.172	31	55.351	30	3:42.536	28
Robert Berkley; Richard Cavanaugh	Doubles	46.455	24	45.554	20	—N/a				1:32.009	23
John Fee; Jim Moriarty	Doubles	46.075	22	45.965	22	—N/a				1:32.040	24

Women

Athlete	Event	Run 1		Run 2		Run 3		Run 4		Total	
Athlete	Event	Time	Rank	Time	Rank	Time	Rank	Time	Rank	Time	Rank
Maura Haponski	Singles	46.547	26	45.877	24	45.818	25	46.329	25	3:04.571	25
Karen Roberts	Singles	46.366	24	46.142	25	45.581	24	45.994	24	3:04.083	24
Kathleen Ann Roberts-Homstad	Singles	45.413	19	45.744	23	44.848	18	45.346	22	3:01.351	21

== Nordic combined ==
Athlete	Event	Ski jumping				Cross-country			Total	
Athlete	Event	Jump 1	Jump 2	Points	Rank	Time	Points	Rank	Points	Rank
Mike Devecka	Individual	77.0	74.6	151.6	32	51:06.38	192.28	18	343.88	28
Jim Galanes	Individual	90.6	93.5	184.1	25	50:34.71	197.03	15	381.13	17
Walter Malmquist	Individual	90.0	91.3	181.3	26	54:40.40	160.17	30	341.47	29

== Ski jumping ==
Athlete	Event	Jump 1		Jump 2		Total	
Athlete	Event	Distance	Points	Distance	Points	Points	Rank
Jim Denney	Normal hill	79.0	110.7	76.5	108.2	218.9	21
Jerry Martin	Normal hill	78.0	109.6	74.5	103.0	212.6	27
Kip Sundgaard	Normal hill	68.0	89.6	67.0	88.0	177.6	53
Greg Windsperger	Normal hill	76.0	103.9	75.5	104.1	208.0	34
Jim Denney	Large hill	89.0	99.1	85.0	92.0	191.1	18
Terry Kern	Large hill	88.0	89.7	85.0	86.5	176.2	30
Jim Maki	Large hill	85.0	89.0	81.0	82.4	171.4	36
Jerry Martin	Large hill	85.0	94.0	78.0	81.7	175.7	32

== Speed skating ==
Men

Athlete	Event	Time	Rank
Jim Chapin	500 m	40.09	10
Dan Immerfall	500 m	39.54	3rd place, bronze medalist(s)
Peter Mueller	500 m	39.57	5
Dan Carroll	1000 m	1:27.37	28
Dan Immerfall	1000 m	1:21.74	12
Peter Mueller	1000 m	1:19.32 OR	1st place, gold medalist(s)
Dan Carroll	1500 m	2:02.26	5
Eric Heiden	1500 m	2:02.40	7
Mike Woods	1500 m	2:08.77	23
Dan Carroll	5000 m	7:36.46	6
Eric Heiden	5000 m	7:59.00	19
Mike Woods	5000 m	7:48.08	12
Dan Carroll	10,000 m	15:19.29	7
Charles Gilmore	10,000 m	16:26.35	19
Mike Woods	10,000 m	15:53.42	12

Women

Athlete	Event	Time	Rank
Lori Monk	500 m	44.00	9
Leah Poulos	500 m	43.21	4
Sheila Young	500 m	42.46 OR	1st place, gold medalist(s)
Peggy Crowe	1000 m	DSQ	
Leah Poulos	1000 m	1:28.57	2nd place, silver medalist(s)
Sheila Young	1000 m	1:29.14	3rd place, bronze medalist(s)
Leah Poulos	1500 m	2:19.11	6
Cindy Seikkula	1500 m	2:24.06	17
Sheila Young	1500 m	2:17.06	2nd place, silver medalist(s)
Beth Heiden	3000 m	4:51.67	11
Cindy Seikkula	3000 m	4:57.57	17
Nancy Swider-Peltz	3000 m	4:48.46	7

== See also ==
- United States at the 1976 Winter Paralympics
