= Speed skating at the 1976 Winter Olympics – Women's 3000 metres =

Women's 3000 metres at the XII Olympic Winter Games
- Pictogram for speed skating
- Venue: Eisschnellaufbahn
- Dates: February 8, 1976
- Competitors: 26 from 12 nations
- Winning time: 4:45.19

Medalists
1st place, gold medalist(s)		Tatyana Averina; Soviet Union
2nd place, silver medalist(s)		Andrea Mitscherlich; East Germany
3rd place, bronze medalist(s)		Lisbeth Korsmo; Norway

The women's 3000 metres in speed skating at the 1976 Winter Olympics took place on 8 February, at the Eisschnellaufbahn.

== Records ==
Prior to this competition, the existing world and Olympic records were as follows:

World record	Tamara Kuznetsova (URS)	4:44.69	Alma-Ata, Kazakh SSR, Soviet Union	12 January 1975
Olympic record	Stien Kaiser (NED)	4:52.14	Sapporo, Japan	12 February 1972

The following new Olympic records was set during the competition.

Date	Pair	Athlete	Country	Time	OR	WR
8 February	Pair 1	Ines Bautzmann	East Germany	4:46.67	OR	
8 February	Pair 6	Tatyana Averina	Soviet Union	4:45.19	OR	

== Results ==
Rank	Pair	Lane	Athlete	Country	Time	Behind	Notes
1st place, gold medalist(s)	6	i	Tatyana Averina	Soviet Union	4:45.19	–	OR
2nd place, silver medalist(s)	10	i	Andrea Mitscherlich	East Germany	4:45.23	+0.04	
3rd place, bronze medalist(s)	9	o	Lisbeth Korsmo	Norway	4:45.24	+0.05	
4	13	o	Karin Kessow	East Germany	4:45.60	+0.41	
5	1	i	Ines Bautzmann	East Germany	4:46.67	+1.48	
6	10	o	Sylvia Filipsson	Sweden	4:48.15	+2.96	
7	2	i	Nancy Swider-Peltz	United States	4:48.46	+3.17	
8	7	i	Sylvia Burka	Canada	4:49.04	+3.85	
9	8	i	Sijtje van der Lende	Netherlands	4:50.86	+5.67	
10	9	i	Erwina Ryś	Poland	4:50.95	+5.76	
11	5	o	Beth Heiden	United States	4:51.67	+6.48	
12	6	o	Tuula Vilkas	Finland	4:51.71	+6.52	
13	13	i	Nina Statkevich	Soviet Union	4:53.94	+8.75	
14	4	i	Tetiana Shelekhova	Soviet Union	4:54.03	+8.84	
15	3	o	Annie Borckink	Netherlands	4:56.75	+11,56	
16	11	i	Janina Korowicka	Poland	4:57.48	+12.29	
17	11	o	Cindy Seikkula	United States	4:57.57	+12.38	
18	12	o	Liz Appleby	Canada	4:58.68	+13.49	
19	7	o	Yuko Yaegashi-Ota	Japan	4:58.92	+13.73	
20	12	i	Christa Jaarsma	Netherlands	5:00.08	+14.89	
21	1	o	Chieko Ito	Japan	5:02.57	+17.38	
22	4	o	Paula-Irmeli Halonen	Finland	5:03.08	+17.89	
23	3	i	Gayle Gordon	Canada	5:07.09	+21.90	
24	8	o	Lee Nam-Sun	South Korea	5:08.34	+23.15	
25	2	o	Ewa Malewicka	Poland	5:08.79	+23.60	
26	5	i	Linda Rombouts	Belgium	5:10.35	+25.16	
