= Speed skating at the 1976 Winter Olympics – Women's 1500 metres =

Women's 1500 metres at the XII Olympic Winter Games
- Pictogram for speed skating
- Venue: Eisschnellaufbahn
- Dates: February 5, 1976
- Competitors: 26 from 12 nations
- Winning time: 2:16.58

Medalists
1st place, gold medalist(s)		Galina Stepanskaya; Soviet Union
2nd place, silver medalist(s)		Sheila Young; United States
3rd place, bronze medalist(s)		Tatyana Averina; Soviet Union

The women's 1500 metres in speed skating at the 1976 Winter Olympics took place on February 5, at the Eisschnellaufbahn.

== Records ==
Prior to this competition, the existing world and Olympic records were as follows:

World record	Tatyana Averina (URS)	2:09.90	Alma-Ata, Kazakh SSR, Soviet Union	11 March 1975
Olympic record	Dianne Holum (USA)	2:20.85	Sapporo, Japan	9 February 1972

The following new world and olympic record were set during the competition.

Date	Pair	Athlete	Country	Time	OR	WR
5 February	Pair 1	Lisbeth Korsmo	Norway	2:18.99	OR	
5 February	Pair 4	Tatyana Averina	Soviet Union	2:17.96	OR	
5 February	Pair 7	Galina Stepanskaya	Soviet Union	2:16.58	OR	

== Results ==
Rank	Pair	Lane	Athlete	Country	Time	Behind	Notes
1st place, gold medalist(s)	7	o	Galina Stepanskaya	Soviet Union	2:16.58	–	OR
2nd place, silver medalist(s)	9	i	Sheila Young	United States	2:17.06	+0.38	
3rd place, bronze medalist(s)	4	o	Tatyana Averina	Soviet Union	2:17.96	+1.38	
4	1	i	Lisbeth Korsmo	Norway	2:18.99	+2.41	
5	9	o	Karin Kessow	East Germany	2:19.05	+2.47	
6	12	o	Leah Poulos	United States	2:19.11	+2.53	
7	1	o	Ines Bautzmann	East Germany	2:19.63	+3.05	
8	8	o	Erwina Ryś	Poland	2:19.69	+3.11	
9	3	i	Sylvia Burka	Canada	2:19.74	+3.16	
10	12	i	Andrea Mitscherlich	East Germany	2:20.05	+3.47	
11	8	i	Sigrid Sundby-Dybedahl	Norway	2:21.85	+5.27	
12	2	i	Annie Borckink	Netherlands	2:22.06	+5.48	
13	6	i	Sijtje van der Lende	Netherlands	2:22.10	+5.52	
14	5	o	Sylvia Filipsson	Sweden	2:22.42	+5.84	
15	11	o	Nina Statkevich	Soviet Union	2:22.59	+6.01	
16	13	o	Christa Jaarsma	Netherlands	2:23.98	+7.40	
17	4	i	Cindy Seikkula	United States	2:24.06	+7.48	
18	11	i	Ewa Malewicka	Poland	2:24.26	+7.68	
19	3	o	Janina Korowicka	Poland	2:24.30	+7.72	
20	5	i	Tuula Vilkas	Finland	2:24.55	+7.97	
21	6	o	Liz Appleby	Canada	2:24.89	+8.31	
22	2	i	Chieko Ito	Japan	2:25.27	+8.69	
23	13	i	Kathy Vogt	Canada	2:25.49	+8.91	
24	10	o	Yuko Yaegashi-Ota	Japan	2:25.74	+9.16	
25	7	i	Lee Nam-Sun	South Korea	2:26.24	+9.66	
26	10	i	Linda Rombouts	Belgium	2:32.96	+16.38	
