= Speed skating at the 1976 Winter Olympics – Women's 500 metres =

Women's 500 metres at the XII Olympic Winter Games
- Pictogram for speed skating
- Venue: Eisschnellaufbahn
- Dates: February 6, 1976
- Competitors: 27 from 13 nations
- Winning time: 42.76

Medalists
| 1st place, gold medalist(s) | | Sheila Young; United States |
| 2nd place, silver medalist(s) | | Cathy Priestner; Canada |
| 3rd place, bronze medalist(s) | | Tatyana Averina; Soviet Union |

The women's 500 metres in speed skating at the 1976 Winter Olympics took place on 6 February, at the Eisschnellaufbahn.

== Records ==
Prior to this competition, the existing world and Olympic records were as follows:

| World record | Sheila Young (USA) | 40.91 | Davos, Switzerland | 31 January 1976 |
| Olympic record | Anne Henning (USA) | 43.33 | Sapporo, Japan | 10 February 1972 |

The following new World and Olympic records was set during the competition:

| Date | Pair | Athlete | Country | Time | OR | WR |
|---|---|---|---|---|---|---|
| 6 February | Pair 4 | Cathy Priestner | Canada | 43.12 | OR | |
| 6 February | Pair 5 | Sheila Young | United States | 42.76 | OR | |

== Results ==
| Rank | Pair | Lane | Athlete | Country | Time | Difference | Notes |
|---|---|---|---|---|---|---|---|
| 1st place, gold medalist(s) | 5 | o | Sheila Young | United States | 42.76 | – | OR |
| 2nd place, silver medalist(s) | 4 | i | Cathy Priestner | Canada | 43.12 | +0.36 | |
| 3rd place, bronze medalist(s) | 12 | o | Tatyana Averina | Soviet Union | 43.17 | +0.41 | |
| 4 | 8 | i | Leah Poulos | United States | 43.21 | +0.45 | |
| 5 | 9 | o | Vera Krasnova | Soviet Union | 43.23 | +0.47 | |
| 6 | 3 | i | Lyubov Sadchikova | Soviet Union | 43.80 | +1.04 | |
| 7 | 9 | i | Makiko Nagaya | Japan | 43.88 | +1.12 | |
| 8 | 6 | o | Paula-Irmeli Halonen | Finland | 43.99 | +1.23 | |
| 9 | 14 | i | Lori Monk | United States | 44.00 | +1.24 | |
| 10 | 2 | i | Heike Lange | East Germany | 44.21 | +1.45 | |
| 11 | 10 | i | Sylvia Burka | Canada | 44.35 | +1.59 | |
| 12 | 4 | o | Monika Pflug | West Germany | 44.36 | +1.60 | |
| 13 | 1 | i | Ann-Sofie Järnström | Sweden | 44.49 | +1.73 | |
| 14 | 10 | o | Stanisława Pietruszczak | Poland | 44.68 | +1.92 | |
| 15 | 12 | i | Ines Bautzmann | East Germany | 44.87 | +2.11 | |
| 16 | 1 | o | Sigrid Sundby-Dybedahl | Norway | 45.00 | +2.24 | |
| 17 | 3 | o | Keiko Hasegawa | Japan | 45.09 | +2.33 | |
| 18 | 5 | i | Erwina Ryś-Ferens | Poland | 45.37 | +2.61 | |
| 19 | 7 | i | Christa Jaarsma | Netherlands | 45.45 | +2.69 | |
| 20 | 7 | o | Ute Dix | East Germany | 45.60 | +2.84 | |
| 21 | 13 | i | Kathy Vogt | Canada | 45.62 | +2.86 | |
| 22 | 8 | o | Sylvia Filipsson | Sweden | 45.97 | +3.21 | |
| 23 | 6 | i | Annie Borckink | Netherlands | 46.00 | +3.24 | |
| 24 | 13 | o | Sijtje van der Lende | Netherlands | 46.06 | +3.30 | |
| 25 | 11 | i | Lee Nam-sun | South Korea | 46.33 | +3.57 | |
| 26 | 11 | o | Ewa Malewicka | Poland | 46.67 | +3.91 | Fall |
| 27 | 2 | o | Linda Rombouts | Belgium | 48.31 | +5.56 | |
