= Speed skating at the 1976 Winter Olympics =

Speed skating at the XII Olympic Winter Games
- Pictogram for speed skating
- Venue: Eisschnellaufbahn
- Dates: 5–14 February 1976
- No. of events: 9
- Competitors: 111 from 19 nations

Speed skating at the 1976 Winter Olympics, was held from 5 to 14 February. Nine events were contested at Eisschnelllaufbahn Innsbruck. This was the first Olympics which included the men's 1000 metres, and the first change to the men's program at the Olympics since the elimination of the all-round event in 1928.

== Medal summary ==
=== Medal table ===
Rank	Nation	Gold	Silver	Bronze	Total
1	Soviet Union	4	2	3	9
2	United States	2	2	2	6
3	Norway	2	2	1	5
4	Netherlands	1	1	3	5
5	Canada	0	1	0	1
5	East Germany	0	1	0	1
Totals (6 entries)		9	9	9	27

The Soviet Union led the medal table, with four gold and nine overall. The silver medal for East Germany's Andrea Ehrig-Mitscherlich was the country's first in speed skating.

Tatyana Averina led the individual medal table, winning a medal in all four women's events, two gold and two bronze. Sheila Young won three medals one of each value on the three shortest distances for women. The most successful male skaters were Norway's Sten Stensen and the Netherlands' Piet Kleine, who both won one gold and one silver medal, splitting the long distance events. The Dutch speed skater Hans van Helden won the bronze-medals on all the three longest distances for men. The Russian speed skater Valery Muratov also got a multiple set of medals with a silver medal in the 500 metres event and the bronze medal in the 1000 metres event.

=== Men's events ===
Event	Gold		Silver		Bronze	
500 metres	Yevgeny Kulikov; Soviet Union	39.17 (OR)	Valery Muratov; Soviet Union	39.25	Dan Immerfall; United States	39.54
1000 metres	Peter Mueller; United States	1:19.32 (OR)	Jørn Didriksen; Norway	1:20.45	Valery Muratov; Soviet Union	1:20.57
1500 metres	Jan Egil Storholt; Norway	1:59.38 (OR)	Yury Kondakov; Soviet Union	1:59.97	Hans van Helden; Netherlands	2:00.87
5000 metres	Sten Stensen; Norway	7:24.48	Piet Kleine; Netherlands	7:26.47	Hans van Helden; Netherlands	7:26.54
10,000 metres	Piet Kleine; Netherlands	14:50.59 (OR)	Sten Stensen; Norway	14:53.30	Hans van Helden; Netherlands	15:02.02

=== Women's events ===
Event	Gold		Silver		Bronze	
500 metres	Sheila Young; United States	42.76 (OR)	Cathy Priestner; Canada	43.12	Tatyana Averina; Soviet Union	43.17
1000 metres	Tatyana Averina; Soviet Union	1:28.43 (OR)	Leah Poulos; United States	1:28.57	Sheila Young; United States	1:29.14
1500 metres	Galina Stepanskaya; Soviet Union	2:16.58 (OR)	Sheila Young; United States	2:17.06	Tatyana Averina; Soviet Union	2:17.96
3000 metres	Tatyana Averina; Soviet Union	4:45.19 (OR)	Andrea Mitscherlich; East Germany	4:45.23	Lisbeth Korsmo; Norway	4:45.24

== Records ==
Eight out of the nine events, including the debuting men's 1000 metres, had new Olympic records set, with only the men's 5000 metres record remaining unbroken.

Event	Date	Team	Time	OR	WR
Men's 500 metres	10 February	Yevgeny Kulikov (URS)	39.17	OR	
Men's 1000 metres	12 February	Peter Mueller (USA)	1:19.32	OR	
Men's 1500 metres	13 February	Jan Egil Storholt (NOR)	1:59.38	OR	
Men's 10000 metres	14 February	Piet Kleine (NED)	14:50.59	OR	
Women's 500 metres	6 February	Sheila Young (USA)	42.76	OR	
Women's 1000 metres	7 February	Tatyana Averina (URS)	1:28.43	OR	
Women's 1500 metres	5 February	Galina Stepanskaya (URS)	2:16.58	OR	
Women's 3000 metres	8 February	Tatyana Averina (URS)	4:45.19	OR	

== Participating NOCs ==
Nineteen nations competed in the speed skating events at Innsbruck.

- Australia (1)
- Austria (4)
- Belgium (2)
- Canada (8)
- Finland (4)
- France (2)
- West Germany (3)
- Great Britain (2)
- East Germany (9)
- Italy (6)
- Japan (9)
- South Korea (2)
- Netherlands (6)
- Norway (9)
- Poland (4)
- Switzerland (1)
- Sweden (9)
- Soviet Union (16)
- United States (14)
