= Charles Gilmore =

Charles Gilmore may refer to:

- Charles W. Gilmore (1874–1945), American paleontologist
- Charles Gilmore (speed skater) (born 1950), American speed skater

== See also ==
- Charles Gilmour (disambiguation)
