= 1976 Winter Olympics medal table =

1976 Winter Olympics medals
- Location: Innsbruck, Austria

Highlights
- Most gold medals: Soviet Union (13)
- Most total medals: Soviet Union (27)
- Medalling NOCs: 16

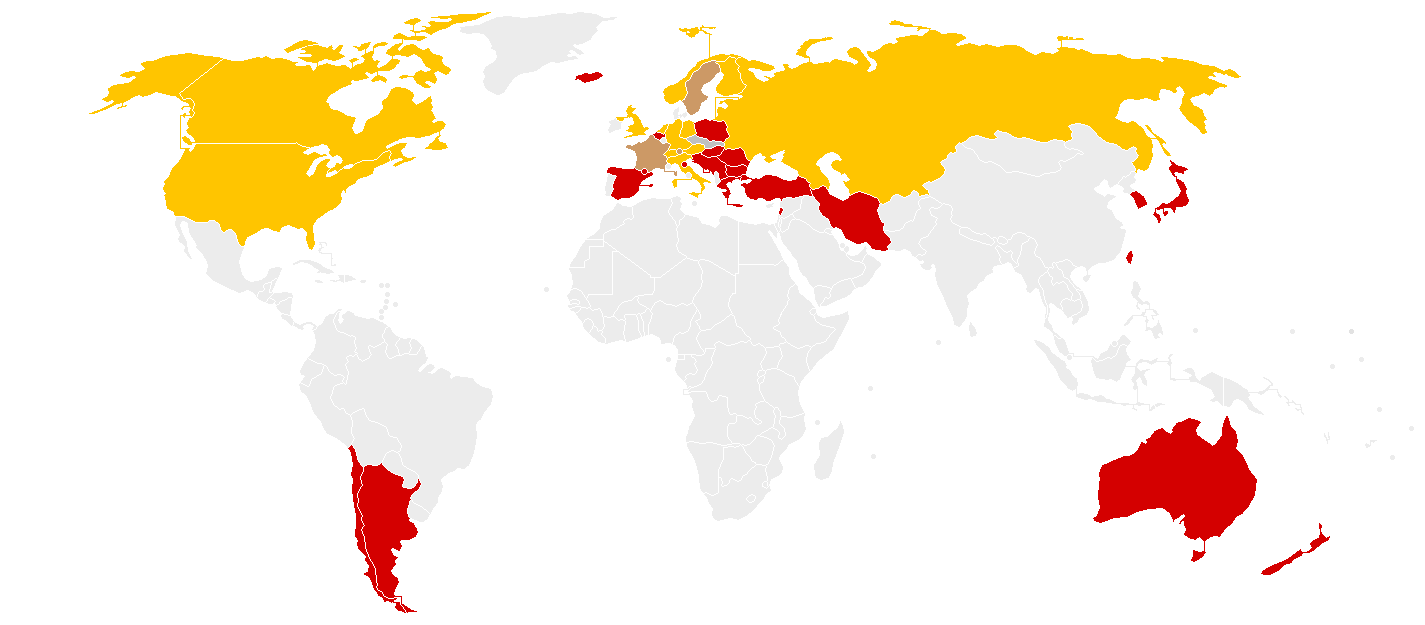
1976 Winter Olympic Games Medals map Legend: Gold represents countries that won at least one gold medal Silver represents countries that won at least one silver medal Bronze represents countries that won at least one bronze medal Red represents countries that did not win any medals Grey represents countries that did not participate

The 1976 Winter Olympics, officially known as the XII Olympic Winter Games, was a winter multi-sport event held in Innsbruck, Austria, from 4 to 15 February 1976. A total of 1,123 athletes representing 37 National Olympic Committees (NOC) participated in 37 events from 10 different sports and disciplines. Two events were contested for the first time: the figure skating discipline of ice dancing, and the men's 1,000 metres in speed skating.

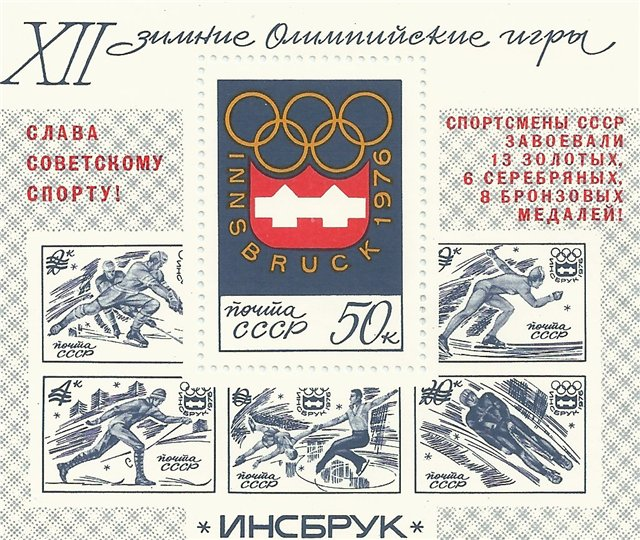
Soviet stamp celebrating the awards of the Soviet athletes at the XII Winter Olympics

Sixteen NOCs won at least one medal, and twelve of them secured at least one gold. The Soviet Union clinched the first place in the gold and overall medal counts, with 13 and 27, respectively. Moreover, the Soviet team also collected the most silver (6) and bronze (8) medals. The host nation, Austria, concluded its participation with a total of six medals (two golds, two silvers, and two bronzes).

Liechtenstein won its first Olympic medals: two bronzes by Willi Frommelt and Hanni Wenzel in the alpine skiing slalom events. East German athletes achieved gold medal sweeps in luge and bobsleigh, which accounted for five of the country's seven Olympic titles. Alpine skier Rosi Mittermaier won the women's downhill and slalom events to give West Germany's two gold medals in these Games. She came close to winning a third in the giant slalom, which would have made her the first woman to win all three Olympic alpine skiing events. Cross-country skier Helena Takalo contributed three of Finland's seven medals by reaching podium place finishes in all of the women's events. Two Dutch speed skaters were responsible for five of their country's six medals: Piet Kleine won the men's 10,000 metres and came second in the 5,000 metres, while Hans van Helden secured bronze medals in the same events and also in the 1,500 metres. Before these Games, Great Britain's last Winter Olympic medal had been a gold at the 1964 Games, also held in Innsbruck. Twelve years later in the same city, the British team won again a single gold medal, this time by figure skater John Curry in the men's singles with a still-standing record total score. The two bronze medals won by Swedish athletes were not enough to prevent this team's performance from becoming the weakest ever in the nation's Winter Olympic history.

Andorra and San Marino sent their first delegations to the Winter Olympics, whereas the Republic of China competed for the second and last time before its return as Chinese Taipei at the 1984 Winter Olympics; none of these teams medalled.

== Medal table ==
The athletes of East Germany's
gold medal sweep in luge

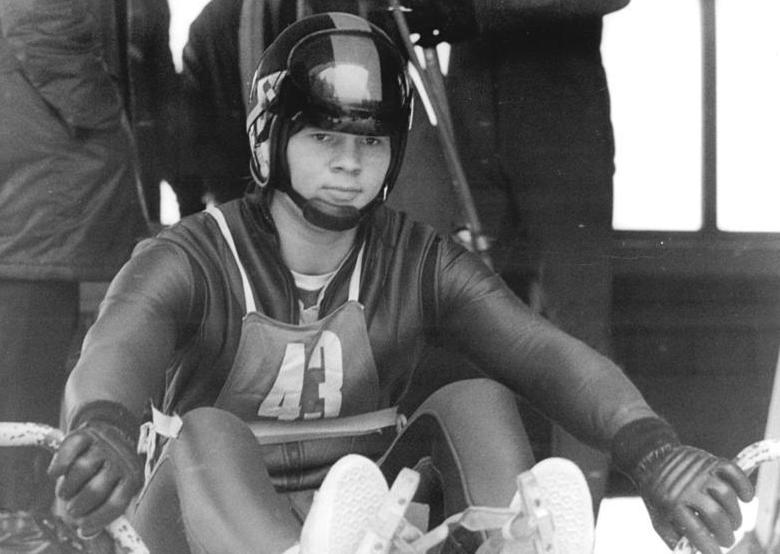
Dettlef Günther (men's individual)

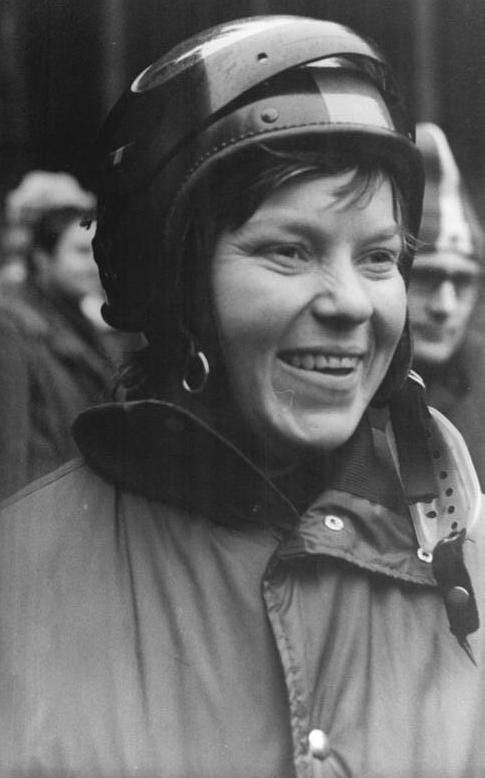
Margit Schumann (women's individual)

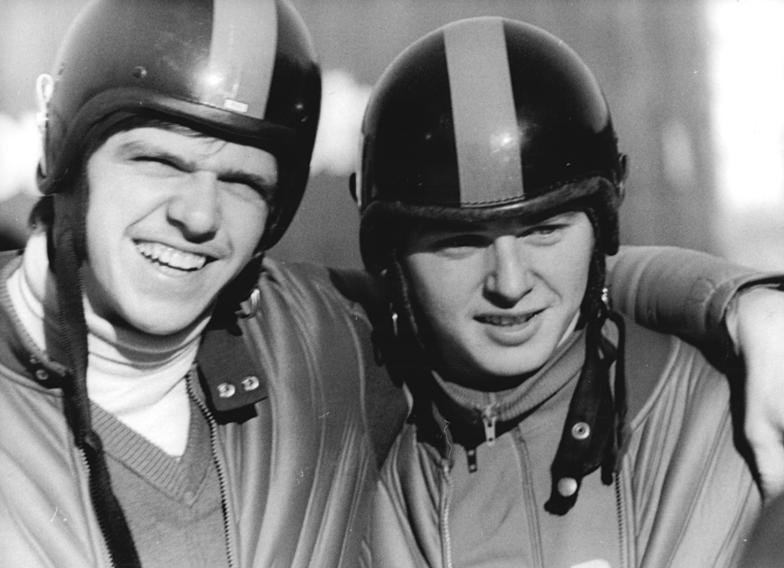
Hans Rinn and Norbert Hahn (doubles)

The medal table is based on information provided by the International Olympic Committee (IOC) and is consistent with IOC convention in its published medal tables. The table uses the Olympic medal table sorting method. By default, the table is ordered by the number of gold medals the athletes from a nation have won, where a nation is an entity represented by a National Olympic Committee (NOC). The number of silver medals is taken into consideration next, and then the number of bronze medals. If teams are still tied, equal ranking is given and they are listed alphabetically by their IOC country code.

* Host nation (Austria)

Rank	Nation	Gold	Silver	Bronze	Total
1	Soviet Union	13	6	8	27
2	East Germany	7	5	7	19
3	United States	3	3	4	10
4	Norway	3	3	1	7
5	West Germany	2	5	3	10
6	Finland	2	4	1	7
7	Austria*	2	2	2	6
8	Switzerland	1	3	1	5
9	Netherlands	1	2	3	6
10	Italy	1	2	1	4
11	Canada	1	1	1	3
12	Great Britain	1	0	0	1
13	Czechoslovakia	0	1	0	1
14	Liechtenstein	0	0	2	2
14	Sweden	0	0	2	2
16	France	0	0	1	1
Totals (16 entries)		37	37	37	111

== Change by doping ==
Galina Kulakova of the Soviet Union finished 3rd in the women's 5 km ski event, but was disqualified due to a positive test for banned substance ephedrine. She claimed that this was a result of using the nasal spray that contained the substance. Both the FIS and the IOC allowed her to compete in the 10 km and the 4×5 km relay. This was the first stripped medal at the Winter Olympics.

Olympics	Athlete	Country	Medal	Event	Ref
1976 Winter Olympics	Galina Kulakova	Soviet Union	3rd place, bronze medalist(s)	Cross-Country Skiing, Women's 5 km	

== See also ==
- 1976 Winter Paralympics medal table
- 1976 Summer Olympics medal table
