= Speed skating at the 1976 Winter Olympics – Men's 10,000 metres =

Speed skating at the Olympics

Men's 10,000 metres at the XII Olympic Winter Games
- Pictogram for speed skating
- Venue: Eisschnellaufbahn
- Dates: 14 February 1976
- Competitors: 20 from 12 nations
- Winning time: 14:50.59 OR

Medalists
1st place, gold medalist(s)		Piet Kleine; Netherlands
2nd place, silver medalist(s)		Sten Stensen; Norway
3rd place, bronze medalist(s)		Hans van Helden; Netherlands

The men's 10,000 metres in speed skating at the 1976 Winter Olympics took place on 14 February, at the Eisschnellaufbahn.

== Records ==
Prior to this competition, the existing world and Olympic records were as follows:

World record	Sten Stensen (NOR)	14:50.31	Oslo, Norway	25 January 1976
Olympic record	Ard Schenk (NED)	15:01.35	Sapporo, Japan	7 February 1972

The following new world and olympic records was set during the competition.

Date	Pair	Athlete	Country	Time	OR	WR
14 February	Pair 3	Sten Stensen	Norway	14:53.30	OR	
14 February	Pair 8	Piet Kleine	Netherlands	14:50.59	OR	

== Results ==
Rank	Pair	Lane	Athlete	Country	Time	Time behind	Notes
1st place, gold medalist(s)	8	o	Piet Kleine	Netherlands	14:50.59	–	OR
2nd place, silver medalist(s)	6	o	Sten Stensen	Norway	14:53.30	+2.72	
3rd place, bronze medalist(s)	4	i	Hans van Helden	Netherlands	15:02.02	+11.43	
4	5	o	Viktor Varlamov	Soviet Union	15:06.06	+15.47	
5	3	i	Örjan Sandler	Sweden	15:16.21	+25.47	
6	6	i	Colin Coates	Australia	15:16.80	+26.21	
7	1	o	Dan Carroll	United States	15:19.29	+28.71	
8	3	o	Franz Krienbühl	Switzerland	15:36.43	+45.84	
9	4	o	Olavi Köppä	Finland	15:39.73	+49.14	
10	10	i	Amund Sjøbrend	Norway	15:43.29	+52.70	
11	11	o	Sergey Marchuk	Soviet Union	15:43.81	+53.22	
12	9	i	Mike Woods	United States	15:53.42	+1:02.83	
13	9	o	Lennart Carlsson	Sweden	15:53.89	+1:03.30	
14	11	i	Jan Egil Storholt	Norway	16:06.37	+1:15.78	
15	8	i	Vladimir Ivanov	Soviet Union	16:16.20	+1:25.61	
16	2	i	Masahiko Yamamoto	Japan	16:20.83	+1:30.24	
17	2	o	Maurizio Marchetto	Italy	16:22.55	+1:31.96	
18	7	o	Geoff Sandys	Great Britain	16:26.27	+1:35.68	
19	10	o	Charles Gilmore	United States	16:26.35	+1:35.76	
20	5	i	Hubert Gundolf	Austria	17:52.43	+3:01.84	
