= Charles Gilmour =

Charles or Charlie Gilmour may refer to:

- Charlie Gilmour (footballer, born 1942), Scottish footballer (Queen's Park)
- Charlie Gilmour (footballer, born 1999), Scottish footballer (Inverness Caledonian Thistle)
- Lord Charles Gilmour, fictional character in Upstairs, Downstairs (1971 TV series)
- Sir Charles Gilmour, 2nd Baronet (died 1750), Scottish politician
- Charlie Gilmour (writer), shortlisted for Wainwright Prize 2021 for Featherhood

== See also ==
- Charles W. Gilmore (1874–1945), American paleontologist
- Charles Gilmore (speed skater) (born 1950), American speed skater
