= Speed skating at the 1976 Winter Olympics – Men's 5000 metres =

Speed skating at the Olympics

Men's 5000 metres at the XII Olympic Winter Games
- Pictogram for speed skating
- Venue: Eisschnellaufbahn
- Dates: 11 February 1976
- Competitors: 31 from 17 nations
- Winning time: 7:24.48

Medalists
1st place, gold medalist(s)		Sten Stensen; Norway
2nd place, silver medalist(s)		Piet Kleine; Netherlands
3rd place, bronze medalist(s)		Hans van Helden; Netherlands

The men's 5000 metres in speed skating at the 1976 Winter Olympics took place on 11 February, at the Eisschnellaufbahn.

== Records ==
Prior to this competition, the existing world and Olympic records were as follows:

World record	Hans van Helden (NED)	7:07.82	Davos, Switzerland	30 January 1976
Olympic record	Fred Anton Maier (NOR)	7:22.4	Grenoble, France	15 February 1968

== Results ==
Rank	Pair	Lane	Athlete	Country	Time	Time behind
1st place, gold medalist(s)	3	i	Sten Stensen	Norway	7:24.48	-
2nd place, silver medalist(s)	9	i	Piet Kleine	Netherlands	7:26.47	+1.99
3rd place, bronze medalist(s)	2	i	Hans van Helden	Netherlands	7:26.54	+2.06
4	3	o	Viktor Varlamov	Soviet Union	7:30.97	+6.49
5	4	i	Klaus Wunderlich	East Germany	7:33.82	+9.34
6	13	o	Dan Carroll	United States	7:36.46	+11.98
7	9	o	Vladimir Ivanov	Soviet Union	7:37.73	+13.25
8	1	i	Örjan Sandler	Sweden	7:39.69	+15.21
9	13	i	Jan Egil Storholt	Norway	7:40.60	+16.12
10	6	o	Colin Coates	Australia	7:41.96	+17.48
11	7	o	Lee Yeong-Ha	South Korea	7:44.21	+19.73
12	5	o	Mike Woods	United States	7:48.08	+23.60
13	16	i	Amund Sjøbrend	Norway	7:48.28	+23.80
14	15	i	Sergey Marchuk	Soviet Union	7:51.37	+26.98
15	2	o	Herbert Schwarz	West Germany	7:52.26	+27.78
16	11	i	Lennart Carlsson	Sweden	7:53.02	+28.54
17	8	o	Franz Krienbühl	Switzerland	7:53.11	+28.63
18	8	i	Manfred Winter	East Germany	7:58.28	+33.60
19	15	o	Eric Heiden	United States	7:59.00	+34.52
20	5	i	Olavi Köppä	Finland	7:59.52	+35.04
21	1	o	Maurizio Marchetto	Italy	8:04.07	+39.59
22	11	o	Masahiko Yamamoto	Japan	8:06.97	+42.49
23	10	o	Andy Barron	Canada	8:10.00	+45.52
24	6	o	Masayuki Kawahara	Japan	8:10.08	+46.60
25	16	o	Dan Johansson	Sweden	8:12.37	+47.89
26	7	i	Geoff Sandys	Great Britain	8:13.03	+48.55
27	4	o	Ludwig Kronfuß	Austria	8:19.72	+55.24
28	12	o	Ivano Bamberghi	Italy	8:21.04	+56.56
29	12	i	Hubert Gundolf	Austria	8:29.34	+1:04.86
30	10	i	Gilbert Van Eesbeeck	Belgium	8:29.78	+1:05.30
31	14	i	Loris Vellar	Italy	8:31.85	+1:07.37
