= Speed skating at the 1976 Winter Olympics – Men's 1000 metres =

Speed skating at the Olympics

Men's 1000 metres at the XII Olympic Winter Games
- Pictogram for speed skating
- Venue: Eisschnellaufbahn
- Dates: 12 February 1976
- Competitors: 31 from 16 nations
- Winning time: 1:19.32

Medalists
1st place, gold medalist(s)		Peter Mueller; United States
2nd place, silver medalist(s)		Jørn Didriksen; Norway
3rd place, bronze medalist(s)		Valery Muratov; Soviet Union

The men's 1000 metres in speed skating at the 1976 Winter Olympics took place on 12 February, at the Eisschnellaufbahn.

== Records ==
Prior to this competition, the existing world and Olympic records were as follows:

World record	Valery Muratov (URS)	1:16.92	Alma-Ata, Kazakh SSR, Soviet Union	17 March 1975
Olympic record	None	None	None	None

The following new Olympic records was set during the competition.

Date	Pair	Athlete	Country	Time	OR	WR
12 February	Pair 1	Gaétan Boucher	Canada	1:21.23	OR	
12 February	Pair 2	Peter Mueller	United States	1:19.32	OR	

== Results ==
Rank	Pair	Lane	Athlete	Country	Time	Time behind	Notes
1st place, gold medalist(s)	2	i	Peter Mueller	United States	1:19.32	–	OR
2nd place, silver medalist(s)	5	i	Jørn Didriksen	Norway	1:20.45	+1.13	
3rd place, bronze medalist(s)	8	o	Valery Muratov	Soviet Union	1:20.57	+1.25	
4	9	i	Aleksandr Safronov	Soviet Union	1:20.84	+1.52	
5	6	i	Hans van Helden	Netherlands	1:20.85	+1.53	
6	1	o	Gaétan Boucher	Canada	1:21.23	+1.91	
7	8	i	Mats Wallberg	Sweden	1:21.27	+1.95	
8	3	i	Pertti Niittylä	Finland	1:21.43	+2.11	
9	1	i	Horst Freese	West Germany	1:21.48	+2.16	
10	7	i	Klaus Wunderlich	East Germany	1:21.67	+2.35	
11	4	i	Colin Coates	Australia	1:21.72	+2.40	
12	10	i	Dan Immerfall	United States	1:21.74	+2.42	
13	10	o	Johan Granath	Sweden	1:22.63	+3.31	
14	7	o	Bruno Toniolli	Italy	1:22.83	+3.51	
15	6	o	Lee Yeong-Ha	South Korea	1:22.88	+3.56	
16	12	i	Terje Andersen	Norway	1:22.92	+3.60	
17	2	o	Emmanuel Michon	France	1:22.99	+3.67	
18	12	o	Piet Kleine	Netherlands	1:23.00	+3.68	
19	13	i	Masaki Suzuki	Japan	1:23.40	+4.08	
20	9	o	Harald Oehme	East Germany	1:23.88	+4.56	
21	4	o	Archie Marshall	Great Britain	1:24.00	+4.68	
22	15	i	Kay Arne Stenshjemmet	Norway	1:24.71	+5.39	
23	11	o	Tom Overend	Canada	1:25.06	+5.74	
24	13	i	Mikio Oyama	Japan	1:25.91	+6.59	
25	5	o	Berend Schabus	Austria	1:26.50	+7.18	
26	11	i	Floriano Martello	Italy	1:26.54	+7.22	
27	13	o	Richard Tourne	France	1:26.75	+7.43	
28	16	o	Dan Carroll	United States	1:27.37	+8.05	
29	15	o	Andrey Malikov	Soviet Union	1:27.57	+8.25	
30	14	o	Norio Hirate	Japan	1:29.42	+10.10	
31	16	i	Bernt Jansson	Sweden	1:30.27	+10.95	
