= Seikkula =

Seikkula is a Finnish surname. Notable people with the surname include:

- Cindy Seikkula (born 1958), American speed skater
- Irma Seikkula (1914–2001), Finnish actress
