= Stanisława Pietruszczak =

Polish speed skater

Personal information
- Nationality: Polish
- Born: 8 May 1953 (age 71); Tomaszów Mazowiecki, Poland

Sport
- Sport: Speed skating

Stanisława Pietruszczak-Wąchała (born 8 May 1953) is a Polish speed skater. She competed in the women's 500 metres at the 1976 Winter Olympics.
