= Bernt Jansson =

Swedish speed skater

Personal information
- Nationality: Swedish
- Born: 26 June 1950 (age 74); Lidköping, Sweden

Sport
- Sport: Speed skating

Bernt Jansson (born 26 June 1950) is a Swedish speed skater. He competed in the men's 1000 metres event at the 1976 Winter Olympics.
