= Loris Vellar =

Italian speed skater

Personal information
- Nationality: Italian
- Born: 7 November 1950 (age 75) Roana, Italy

Sport
- Sport: Speed skating

Loris Vellar (born 7 November 1950) is an Italian speed skater. He competed in the men's 5000 metres event at the 1976 Winter Olympics.
