= Giovanni Panciera =

Italian speed skater

Personal information
- Nationality: Italian
- Born: 27 December 1954 (age 71) Cortina d'Ampezzo, Italy

Sport
- Sport: Speed skating

Giovanni Panciera (born 27 December 1954) is an Italian speed skater. He competed in the men's 1500 metres event at the 1976 Winter Olympics.
