= Speed skating at the Winter Olympics =

- IOC Code: SSK
- Governing body: ISU
- Events: 14 (men: 7; women: 7)

Winter Olympics
- 1924; 1928; 1932; 1936; 1948; 1952; 1956; 1960; 1964; 1968; 1972; 1976; 1980; 1984; 1988; 1992; 1994; 1998; 2002; 2006; 2010; 2014; 2018; 2022; 2026
- Medalists; Records

Long track speed skating has been featured as a sport in the Winter Olympics since the first winter games in 1924. Women's events were added to the Olympic program for the first time in 1960 Squaw Valley Olympics.

== Summary ==
Games	Year	Events	Best Nation
1	1924	5	Finland (1)
2	1928	4	Norway (1)
3	1932	4	United States (1)
4	1936	4	Norway (2)
5	1948	4	Norway (3)
6	1952	4	Norway (4)
7	1956	4	Soviet Union (1)
8	1960	8	Soviet Union (2)
9	1964	8	Soviet Union (3)
10	1968	8	Netherlands (1)
11	1972	8	Netherlands (2)
12	1976	9	Soviet Union (4)
13	1980	9	United States (2)
14	1984	9	East Germany (1)
15	1988	10	East Germany (2)
16	1992	10	Germany (1)
17	1994	10	Norway (5)
18	1998	10	Netherlands (3)
19	2002	10	Netherlands (4)
20	2006	12	United States (3)
21	2010	12	South Korea (1)
22	2014	12	Netherlands (5)
23	2018	14	Netherlands (6)
24	2022	14	Netherlands (7)
25	2026	14	Netherlands (8)

== History ==
The governing body for speed skating, the International Skating Union (ISU), was included in the list of recognized federations when the International Olympic Committee was founded, but was first discussed seriously for the 1908 Summer Olympics in London. No speed skating events were contested, although figure skating – also governed by the ISU – was on the programme. The preliminary calendar for the 1916 Summer Olympics, to be held in Berlin, listed a 3-event allround competition, but these Games were cancelled because of World War I.

The International Winter Sports Week in Chamonix, retro-actively dubbed the 1924 Winter Olympics, contained five speed skating events. Uncommon for the time, it not only included an all-round competition, but also awarded medals for the individual distances: 500 m, 1500 m, 5000 m and 10000 m. The all-round event was dropped before the 1928 Games, even though it remained the only World Championship format in the sport until the 1970s; single distance World Championships were not established until 1996.

The 1932 speed skating events were held according to the North American rules, meaning the skaters competed in small packs of skaters (the format paved the way for the development of short track speed skating), instead of the common against-the-clock format. These Games in Lake Placid, New York, also saw the first female speed skaters at the Olympics in a set of demonstration events, with all victories being achieved by North American athletes. Women's events were also set to be held at the 1940 Winter Olympics, which were cancelled. After the war, they were withdrawn again by the decision of the IOC until the 1960 Olympics in Squaw Valley, when the women skated 500 m, 1000 m, 1500 m and 3000 m.

Following the introduction of World Sprint Championships in the early 1970s, the 1000 m for men was added in Innsbruck 1976, while the women's 5000 m, reinstated by the ISU as an official distance in 1981, made its Olympic debut in 1988. The latest addition to the Olympic speed skating programme is the team pursuit, which was added for the 2006 Turin Games. Its inclusion was remarkable as it had not yet been contested at a senior World Championship in the form skated at the Olympics at the time of inclusion. It had however been contested at a senior World Championship, the Dutch team won the 2005 title in Inzell, but in that form they only had to skate once and be the fastest, while the Olympic form required three starts.

At the 2010 Winter Olympics, Haralds Silovs became the first athlete in Olympic history to participate in both short track (1500m) and long track (5000m) speed skating, and the first to compete in two different disciplines on the same day.

== Events ==
=== Men's ===
The following table shows when events were contested at each Games. Women's events were demonstrated in 1932.

• = official event, (d) = demonstration event

Event	24	28	32	36	48	52	56	60	64	68	72	76	80	84	88	92	94	98	02	06	10	14	18	22	26	Years
500 metres	•	•	•	•	•	•	•	•	•	•	•	•	•	•	•	•	•	•	•	•	•	•	•	•	•	25
1000 metres												•	•	•	•	•	•	•	•	•	•	•	•	•	•	14
1500 metres	•	•	•	•	•	•	•	•	•	•	•	•	•	•	•	•	•	•	•	•	•	•	•	•	•	25
5000 metres	•	•	•	•	•	•	•	•	•	•	•	•	•	•	•	•	•	•	•	•	•	•	•	•	•	25
10000 metres	•	•	•	•	•	•	•	•	•	•	•	•	•	•	•	•	•	•	•	•	•	•	•	•	•	25
all-round	•																									1
mass start																							•	•	•	3
team pursuit																				•	•	•	•	•	•	6
Total events	5	3	4	4	4	4	4	4	4	4	4	5	5	5	5	5	5	5	5	6	6	6	7	7	7	

=== Women's ===
• = official event, (d) = demonstration event

Event	24	28	32	36	48	52	56	60	64	68	72	76	80	84	88	92	94	98	02	06	10	14	18	22	26	Years
500 metres			(d)					•	•	•	•	•	•	•	•	•	•	•	•	•	•	•	•	•	•	18
1000 metres			(d)					•	•	•	•	•	•	•	•	•	•	•	•	•	•	•	•	•	•	18
1500 metres			(d)					•	•	•	•	•	•	•	•	•	•	•	•	•	•	•	•	•	•	18
3000 metres								•	•	•	•	•	•	•	•	•	•	•	•	•	•	•	•	•	•	18
5000 metres															•	•	•	•	•	•	•	•	•	•	•	10
mass start																							•	•	•	3
team pursuit																				•	•	•	•	•	•	6
Total events			3					4	4	4	4	5	5	5	5	5	5	5	5	6	6	6	7	7	7	

== Medal table ==
Sources (after the 2022 Winter Olympics):
Accurate as of 2026 Winter Olympics.

Rank	Nation	Gold	Silver	Bronze	Total
1	Netherlands	53	50	43	146
2	United States	32	24	20	76
3	Norway	29	31	31	91
4	Soviet Union	24	17	19	60
5	Germany	13	15	10	38
6	Canada	11	17	19	47
7	Sweden	9	4	5	18
8	East Germany	8	12	9	29
9	Finland	7	8	9	24
10	Japan	5	10	14	29
11	South Korea	5	10	5	20
12	Italy	5	1	6	12
13	Czech Republic	4	3	3	10
14	Russia	3	5	5	13
15	China	3	3	6	12
16	West Germany	3	0	0	3
17	Poland	1	3	3	7
18	Austria	1	2	3	6
19	Belgium	1	1	1	3
20	United Team of Germany	1	1	0	2
21	ROC (ROC)	0	1	1	2
22	Belarus	0	1	0	1
22	Denmark	0	1	0	1
22	North Korea	0	1	0	1
25	Kazakhstan	0	0	1	1
25	Olympic Athletes from Russia	0	0	1	1
Totals (26 entries)		218	221	214	653

== Number of speed skaters by country ==
= Countries that did not participate in the Olympic Winter Games in that year or didn't exist at the time.

Country	24	28	32	36	48	52	56	60	64	68	72	76	80	84	88	92	94	98	02	06	10	14	18	22	26	Years
Australia				1		1	1	2		1	2	1	2	2	4	2	2				1	1	1			15
Austria		3		8	3	3	4	2	7	3	1	4		4	3	3	5	4	1	1	1	2	2	2	6	22
Belarus																	2	4	5	1	1		4	5		7
Belgium	4			2	1	3	2		1			2						1	1	1		2	3	3	6	14
British Virgin Islands														1												1
Canada	1	3	7	1	4	4	3	5	4	7	10	8	8	7	16	9	13	17	16	18	16	15	19	16	15	25
China													13	12	4	10	6	12	12	15	14	10	13	14	15	13
Chinese Taipei																						1	3	1	1	4
Colombia																							2	1		2
Czechoslovakia				2	1		3		2						1	2										6
Czech Republic																			1	1	2	2	3	2	3	7
Denmark					1			1	1												1		3	2	1	7
Estonia		2		1																			2	1	1	5
Finland	3	6	1	5	5	6	6	7	10	8	6	4	4	3	2	3		1	3	4	4	3	3			22
France	4	2					1	3	3	5	1	2	1	2	4	1		1	1		2	3	1		6	18
Germany		3		2		1										14	15	14	13	13	13	14	9	5	13	13
United Team of Germany							4	12	13																	3
East Germany										1	2	9	9	10	11											6
West Germany										9	7	3	4	7	5											6
Great Britain	4	3			5	3	3	2	3	5	2	2	6	1	2	1								2	1	16
Hungary		1		1	5	2			4	3				1		2	1	2	2			1	1		1	14
Italy					4	3	6	3	2	4	2	6	3	3	3	4	5	4	8	8	5	6	9	7	10	20
Japan			4	7		6	5	8	8	12	13	9	8	9	13	15	17	18	20	19	19	17	16	15	14	22
Kazakhstan																	8	7	8	4	5	6	6	5	5	9
North Korea									9		6			6	4	5		2			1					7
South Korea					3		4	5	4	2	4	2	5	6	6	5	9	13	12	14	16	15	16	10	8	20
Latvia	1	1		3													1	1	1		1	1	1	1		10
Lithuania		1																								1
Mongolia									3	3	2		2			2										5
Netherlands		2		5	4	7	6	5	5	9	10	7	9	11	11	14	13	16	17	20	19	20	20	18	19	23
New Zealand																		1			1	1	3	1		5
Norway	5	8	6	7	12	12	11	6	9	14	14	9	11	8	7	8	8	10	8	10	9	9	9	12	10	25
Poland	1			1				2	3			4	2	3	3	4	5	3	4	5	10	10	14	10	9	18
Portugal																		1								1
Romania													3	2		3	4	2	2	2			1	1		9
Soviet Union							12	16	18	18	9	16	16	17	17											9
Unified Team																19										1
Russia																	12	18	13	19	17	20				6
Olympic Athletes from Russia																							4			1
ROC (ROC)																								16		1
Sweden	2	1	1	1	6	9	7	9	10	11	11	9	10	6	7	8	5		1	2	3	1	1	1		23
Switzerland					5		2		3	3		1	1	1			1	1			1		2	2	3	13
Ukraine																	2	4	2							3
United States	6	4	12	5	9	7	8	15	15	18	16	14	11	13	15	19	16	14	17	18	18	17	13	12	13	25
Yugoslavia														4	2	2										3
Countries	10	14	6	16	15	14	18	17	22	19	18	19	20	24	21	23	21	25	23	19	24	23	29	30	23	
Speed skaters	31	40	31	52	68	67	88	103	137	137	118	122	127	139	142	155	151	171	166	175	180	179	184	166	164	
Year	24	28	32	36	48	52	56	60	64	68	72	76	80	84	88	92	94	98	02	06	10	14	18	22	26	

== See also ==
- Ice sledge speed racing at the Winter Paralympics
- List of Olympic venues in speed skating
- List of Olympic medalists in speed skating
