= Frederick Fritsch =

American bobsledder (born 1954)

Frederick William Fritsch (born September 10, 1954, Akron, Ohio) is an American former bobsleigh athlete who competed for the United States at the 1976 Winter Olympics and 1984 Winter Olympics.

Fritsch was a member of the USA-2 four-man bobsleigh team which finished 19th at the 1976 Olympics in Innsbruck. He then participated as a member of the USA-2 two-man sled which finished 17th at the 1984 Olympics in Sarajevo.

Fritsch served in the United States Navy, and retired in 2013 as a sports chiropractor.
