= Yuri Kondakov =

Russian speed skater

Personal information
- Nationality: Russian
- Born: Yuri Georgievich Kondakov; 24 November 1951 (age 74) Lesnoi, Russian SFSR, Soviet Union
- Height: 1.76 m (5 ft 9 in)
- Weight: 69 kg (152 lb)

Sport
- Country: Soviet Union
- Sport: Speed skating
- Turned pro: 1972
- Retired: 1980

Achievements and titles
- Personal best(s): 500 m: 39.09 (1980); 1000 m: 1:19.01 (1974); 1500 m: 1:56.01 (1980); 3000 m: 4:01.50 (1980); 5000 m: 7:05.2 (1976); 10 000 m: 15:05.17 (1974)
Medal record
Men's Speed Skating
Silver medal – second place	1976 Innsbruck	1500 m

Kondakov, 1500 m. WCship 1973 (Polygoon Film)

Yuri Georgievich Kondakov (Russian: Юрий Георгиевич Кондаков, born 24 November 1951) is a Russian/Ukrainian speed skater who competed for the Soviet Union in the 1976 Winter Olympics and in the 1980 Winter Olympics, as well as several European and World Championships in the 1970s.

Kondakov was World Junior allround Champion in 1972. As a senior his best result in the World allround Championships was a bronze medal in 1975. This year he won the Soviet allround Championships. In the European allround Championships his best result was 6th place, a result he recorded twice, in 1975 and 1978. In 1976 he won the silver medal in the 1500 metres event at the Olympic Games in Innsbruck, behind the Norwegian Jan Egil Storholt.

Four years later he finished fifth in the 1500 metres competition of the 1980 Games.

== World record ==
Discipline	Time	Date	Location
5000 m	7.08,92	24 March 1975	Medeo

Source: SpeedSkatingStats.com
