= Speed skating at the 1976 Winter Olympics – Men's 1500 metres =

Speed skating at the Olympics

Men's 1500 metres at the XII Olympic Winter Games
- Pictogram for speed skating
- Venue: Eisschnellaufbahn
- Dates: 13 February 1976
- Competitors: 30 from 18 nations
- Winning time: 1:59.38

Medalists
1st place, gold medalist(s)		Jan Egil Storholt; Norway
2nd place, silver medalist(s)		Yury Kondakov; Soviet Union
3rd place, bronze medalist(s)		Hans van Helden; Netherlands

The men's 1500 metres in speed skating at the 1976 Winter Olympics took place on 13 February, at the Eisschnellaufbahn.

== Records ==
Prior to this competition, the existing world and Olympic records were as follows:

World record	Ard Schenk (NED)	1:58.7	Davos, Switzerland	16 January 1971
Olympic record	Ard Schenk (NED)	2:02.96	Sapporo, Japan	6 February 1972

The following new world and olympic records was set during the competition.

Date	Pair	Athlete	Country	Time	OR	WR
13 February	Pair 2	Hans van Helden	Netherlands	2:00.87	OR	
13 February	Pair 4	Jan Egil Storholt	Norway	1:59.38	OR	

== Results ==
Rank	Pair	Lane	Athlete	Country	Time	Time behind	Notes
1st place, gold medalist(s)	4	i	Jan Egil Storholt	Norway	1:59.38	–	OR
2nd place, silver medalist(s)	4	o	Yury Kondakov	Soviet Union	1:59.97	+0.59	
3rd place, bronze medalist(s)	2	i	Hans van Helden	Netherlands	2:00.87	+1.49	
4	11	i	Sergey Ryabev	Soviet Union	2:02.15	+2.77	
5	2	i	Dan Carroll	United States	2:02.26	+2.88	
6	12	i	Piet Kleine	Netherlands	2:02.28	+2.90	
7	9	i	Eric Heiden	United States	2:02.40	+3.02	
8	7	o	Colin Coates	Australia	2:03.34	+3.96	
9	8	o	Klaus Wunderlich	East Germany	2:03.41	+4.03	
10	7	i	Olavi Köppä	Finland	2:03.69	+4.31	
11	13	i	Kay Stenshjemmet	Norway	2:03.75	+4.37	
12	6	o	Herbert Schwarz	West Germany	2:03.76	+4.38	
13	14	o	Sergey Marchuk	Soviet Union	2:04.45	+5.07	
14	3	o	Gaétan Boucher	Canada	2:04.63	+5.25	
15	14	i	Terje Andersen	Norway	2:04.65	+5.27	
16	8	i	Dan Johansson	Sweden	2:04.73	+5.35	
17	10	i	Lennart Carlsson	Sweden	2:04.76	+5.37	
18	1	o	Lee Yeong-Ha	South Korea	2:05.25	+5.87	
19	5	i	Bruno Toniolli	Italy	2:05.66	+6.28	
20	3	i	Richard Tourne	France	2:06.43	+7.05	
21	6	i	Masahiko Yamamoto	Japan	2:06.67	+7.29	
22	15	i	Mats Wallberg	Sweden	2:08.72	+9.34	
23	15	o	Mike Woods	United States	2:08.77	+9.39	
24	5	o	Geoff Sandys	Great Britain	2:09.17	+9.79	
25	10	o	Floriano Martello	Italy	2:09.68	+10.30	
26	9	o	Ludwig Kronfuß	Austria	2:11.17	+11.79	
27	12	o	Franz Krienbühl	Switzerland	2:12.52	+13.14	
28	11	o	Gilbert Van Eesbeeck	Belgium	2:12.74	+13.36	
29	1	i	Berend Schabus	Austria	2:15.41	+16.03	
30	13	o	Giovanni Panciera	Italy	2:33.52	+34.14	
