= Sergey Ryabev =

Soviet speed skater

Personal information
- Nationality: Soviet
- Born: 10 July 1951 (age 73)

Sport
- Sport: Speed skating

Sergey Ryabev (born 10 July 1951) is a Soviet speed skater. He competed in the men's 1500 metres event at the 1976 Winter Olympics.
