= Jørn Didriksen =

Norwegian speed skater

Olympic medal record

Representing Norway

Men's speed skating
Silver medal – second place	1976 Innsbruck	1,000 m

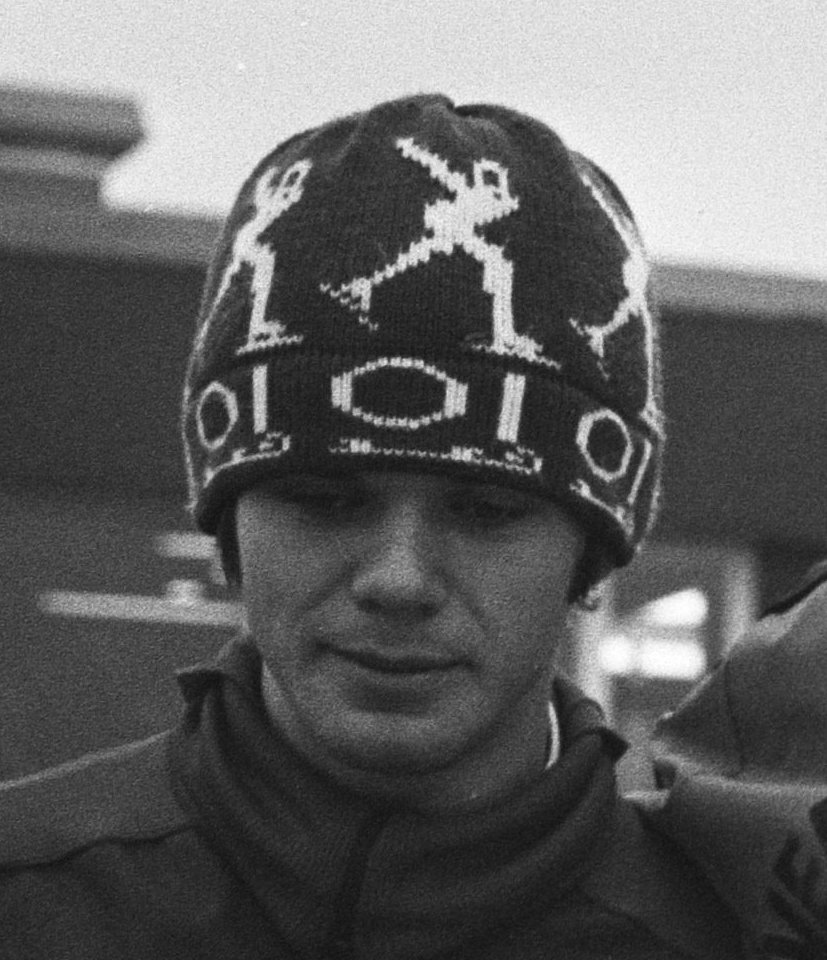
Jørn Didriksen

Jørn Didriksen (born 27 August 1953) is a former speed skater from Norway.

Representing Oslo Idrettslag, Didriksen specialised in the sprint and participated in the World Sprint Championships three times. His best result there was a fourth place in 1975. That same year, he also became Norwegian Sprint Champion. At the 1976 Winter Olympics of Innsbruck, he won a silver medal on the 1,000m behind Peter Mueller.

== Personal records ==
To put these personal records in perspective, the WR column lists the official world records on the dates that Didriksen skated his personal records.

Event	Result	Date	Venue	WR
500 m	38.7	11 January 1977	Hamar	37.00
1,000 m	1:17.34	20 March 1977	Medeo	1:15.33
1,500 m	2:05.8	4 February 1977	Oslo	1:55.61
3,000 m	4:37.1	31 January 1971	Inzell	4:12.6
5,000 m	8:11.0	11 February 1973	Elverum	7:09.8
