= Manfred Winter =

German speed skater

Personal information
- Nationality: German
- Born: 5 July 1954 (age 70); Reichenbach, East Germany

Sport
- Sport: Speed skating

Manfred Winter (born 5 July 1954) is a German speed skater. He competed in the men's 5000 metres event at the 1976 Winter Olympics.
