= Ivano Bamberghi =

Italian speed skater

Personal information
- Nationality: Italian
- Born: 13 January 1949 (age 77) San Martino di Lupari, Italy

Sport
- Sport: Speed skating

Ivano Bamberghi (born 13 January 1949) is an Italian speed skater. He competed in the men's 5000 metres event at the 1976 Winter Olympics.
