= Chris Haines (skier) =

American cross-country skier (born 1951)

Personal information
- Born: May 16, 1951 (age 75) Pullman, Washington, United States

Sport
- Sport: Cross-country skiing

Chris Haines (born May 16, 1951) is an American cross-country skier. He competed in the men's 30 kilometre event at the 1976 Winter Olympics.
