= Charlie Gilmour (footballer, born 1942) =

Scottish footballer

Personal information
- Full name: Charles McGregor Robertson Gilmour
- Date of birth: 17 February 1942 (age 84)
- Place of birth: Pollok, Scotland
- Position: Full back

Senior career*
Years	Team	Apps	(Gls)
1959–1972	Queen's Park	203	(55)
- * Club domestic league appearances and goals

Charles McGregor Robertson Gilmour (born 17 February 1942) is a Scottish retired amateur football full back who made over 200 appearances in the Scottish League for Queen's Park.
