= Peter Dascoulias =

American biathlete (born 1949)

Personal information
- Nationality: American
- Born: April 17, 1949 (age 77) Franklin, New Hampshire, United States

Sport
- Sport: Biathlon

Peter Dascoulias (born April 17, 1949) is an American biathlete. He competed in the 20 km individual event at the 1976 Winter Olympics.
