= Ronny Yeager =

American cross-country skier (born 1952)

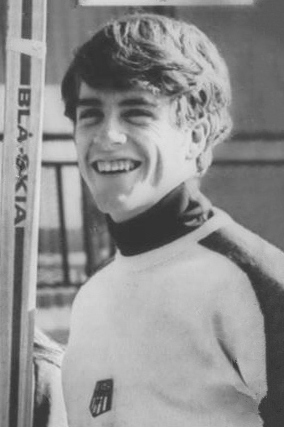
- Yeager in 1972

Personal information
- Born: August 16, 1952 (age 74) Durango, Colorado, U.S.
- Height: 181 cm (5 ft 11 in)
- Weight: 70 kg (154 lb)

Sport
- Sport: Cross-country skiing
- Club: University of Colorado Racing Club

Ronald Paul "Ronny" Yeager (born August 16, 1952) is a retired American cross-country skier. He competed in the 15 km event at the 1972 and 1976 Winter Olympics and finished 52nd-56th; in 1976 he also placed sixth with the 4 × 10 km relay team.

Yeager studied at Durango High School and graduated from University of Colorado in 1972. After retiring from competitions he returned to his hometown and started Ronny Yeager Durango Outfitting company.
