= Lori Monk =

American speed skater (born 1956)

Personal information
- Nationality: American
- Born: March 20, 1956 (age 69); Madison, Wisconsin, U.S.

Sport
- Sport: Speed skating

Lori Monk (born March 20, 1956) is an American speed skater. She competed in the women's 500 metres at the 1976 Winter Olympics.
