= John Proctor (bobsleigh) =

American bobsledder

Personal information
- Born: November 2, 1950 (age 75) Plattsburgh, New York, United States

Sport
- Sport: Bobsleigh

John Proctor (born November 2, 1950) is an American bobsledder. He competed in the two man and the four man events at the 1976 Winter Olympics.
