= Sheila Young =

American speed skater and cyclist

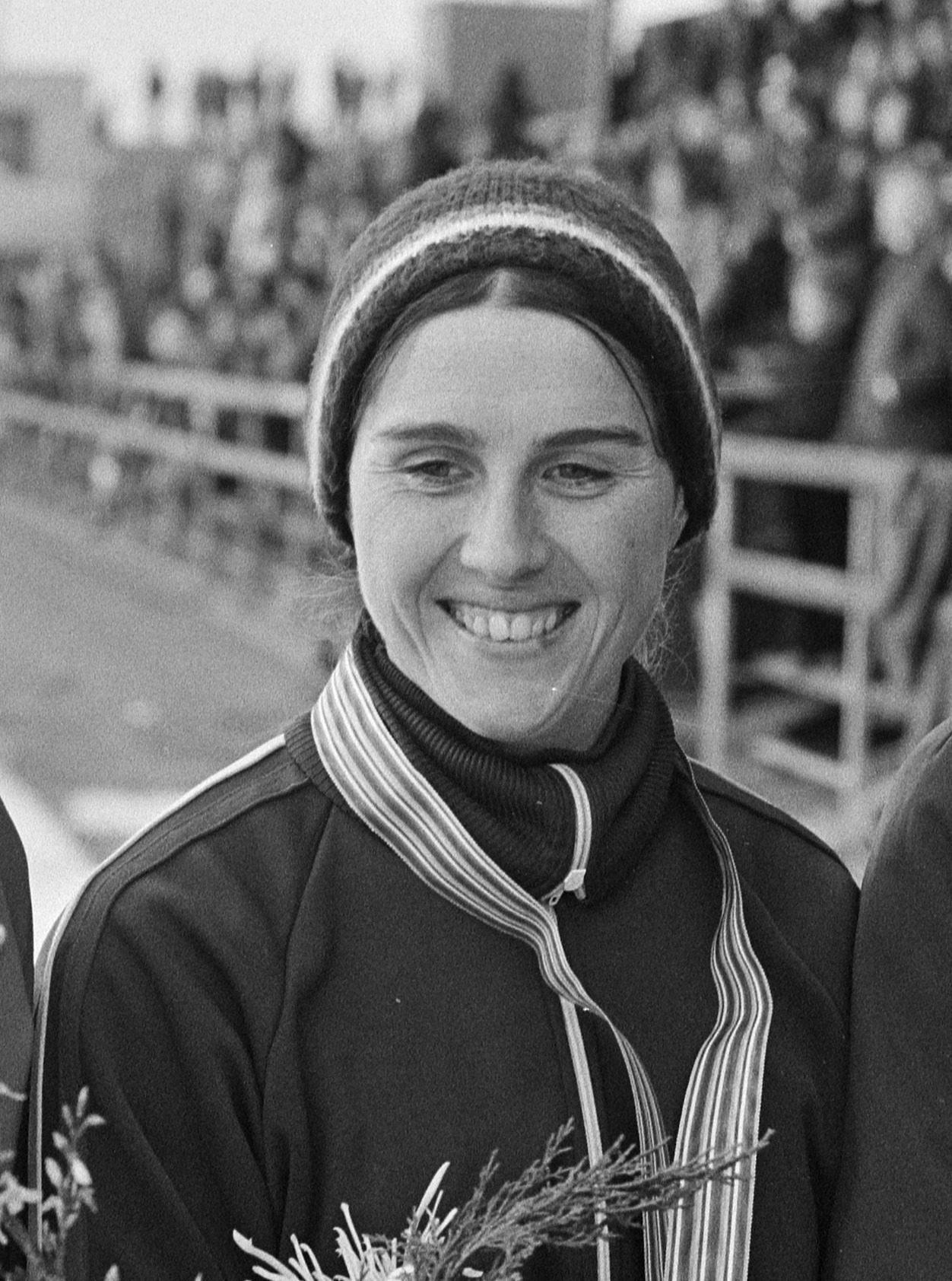
- Sheila Young in 1975

Personal information
- Full name: Sheila Grace Young-Ochowicz
- Born: October 14, 1950 (age 76) Birmingham, Michigan, U.S.
- Height: 1.63 m (5 ft 4 in)
- Weight: 59 kg (130 lb)

Sport
- Sport: Track cycling, speed skating
- Club: Wolverine Skating Club
Medal record
Women's Speed skating
Representing the United States
Olympic Games
Gold medal – first place	1976 Innsbruck	500 m
Silver medal – second place	1976 Innsbruck	1500 m
Bronze medal – third place	1976 Innsbruck	1000 m
World Championships
Gold medal – first place	1973 Oslo	Sprint
Gold medal – first place	1975 Gothenborg	Sprint
Gold medal – first place	1976 Berlin	Sprint
Bronze medal – third place	1975 Assen	Allround
Bronze medal – third place	1976 Gjøvik	Allround
Women's Cycling
Representing the United States
World Championships
Gold medal – first place	1973 San Sebastian	Sprint
Gold medal – first place	1976 Monteroni di Lecce	Sprint
Gold medal – first place	1981 Brno	Sprint
Silver medal – second place	1982 Leicester	Sprint
Bronze medal – third place	1972 Marseille	Sprint

Sheila Grace Young-Ochowicz (born October 14, 1950) is a retired American speed skater and track cyclist. She won three world titles in each of these sports, twice in the same year (in 1973 and 1976). In 1976, she also became the first American athlete to win three medals at one Winter Olympics.

== Early life and education ==
Young and her family moved to Detroit, Michigan where she graduated from Denby High School in 1968. Young was a member of Wolverine Sports Club in the Detroit metropolitan area, which has produced three Olympic medalists since 1972. Their sports: cycling, long-track speed skating, and short-track speed skating. Both her parents had competed in cycling and speed skating and they encouraged Young and her three siblings to do the same. Young's brother Roger also gained fame as a cyclist, winning seven national championships, gold at the 1975 Pan American Games in the team pursuit, and competing at the 1972 Summer Olympics.

== Personal life ==
On the eve of the 1976 Winter Olympics, Young announced her engagement to Jim Ochowicz, a fellow cyclist. Ochowicz competed at the same two Summer Olympics (1972 and 1976) as Young's brother Roger, but in different cycling events – Ochowicz in the 4 km team pursuit, Roger Young in the sprint.

Jim and Sheila Ochowicz live in Palo Alto, California and have three children; Alex, Elli, and Kate. Their daughter Elli Ochowicz is also a speed skater; she competed at the Winter Olympics in 2002, 2006 and 2010. Sheila used to be a teacher in physical education at La Entrada Middle School.

== Career ==
Young had her best year in 1976, when she won three Olympic speed skating medals (one of each colour), bronze at the world allround speed skating championships, became world sprint speed skating champion, skated three world records, became United States sprint track cycling champion, and became the world track cycling sprint champion.

Young retired from cycling and speed skating, and she and Jim worked for the Lake Placid Olympic Committee. They started a family and moved to Milwaukee, Wisconsin. In 1981, at age 31, she came out of retirement, won two more cycling championships, and then retired again in 1982.

Her three Olympic medals in 1976 made her the first United States athlete to win three medals at one Winter Olympics. Her world sprint speed skating championships in 1973 made her the first United States female athlete to accomplish that feat. Her world sprint speed skating championship of 1973 and her world sprint track cycling championship of that same year made her the first athlete to win World championships in two sports in the same year. The United States Olympic Committee named her Sportswoman of the Year in 1976 and 1981 for her accomplishments in both cycling and speed skating. She was inducted in the International Women's Sports Hall of Fame in 1981, the United States Bicycling Hall of Fame in 1988, and the National Speedskating Hall of Fame in 1991.

=== Medals ===
An overview of medals won by Young at important championships, listing the years in which she won each:

Championships	Gold medal	Silver medal	Bronze medal
Speed skating
Winter Olympics	1976 (500 m)	1976 (1,500 m)	1976 (1,000 m)
World Allround	–	–	1975; 1976
World Sprint	1973; 1975; 1976	–	–
Track cycling
World Sprint	1973; 1976; 1981	1982	1972
United States Sprint	1971; 1973; 1976; 1981	?	?

=== Speed skating ===
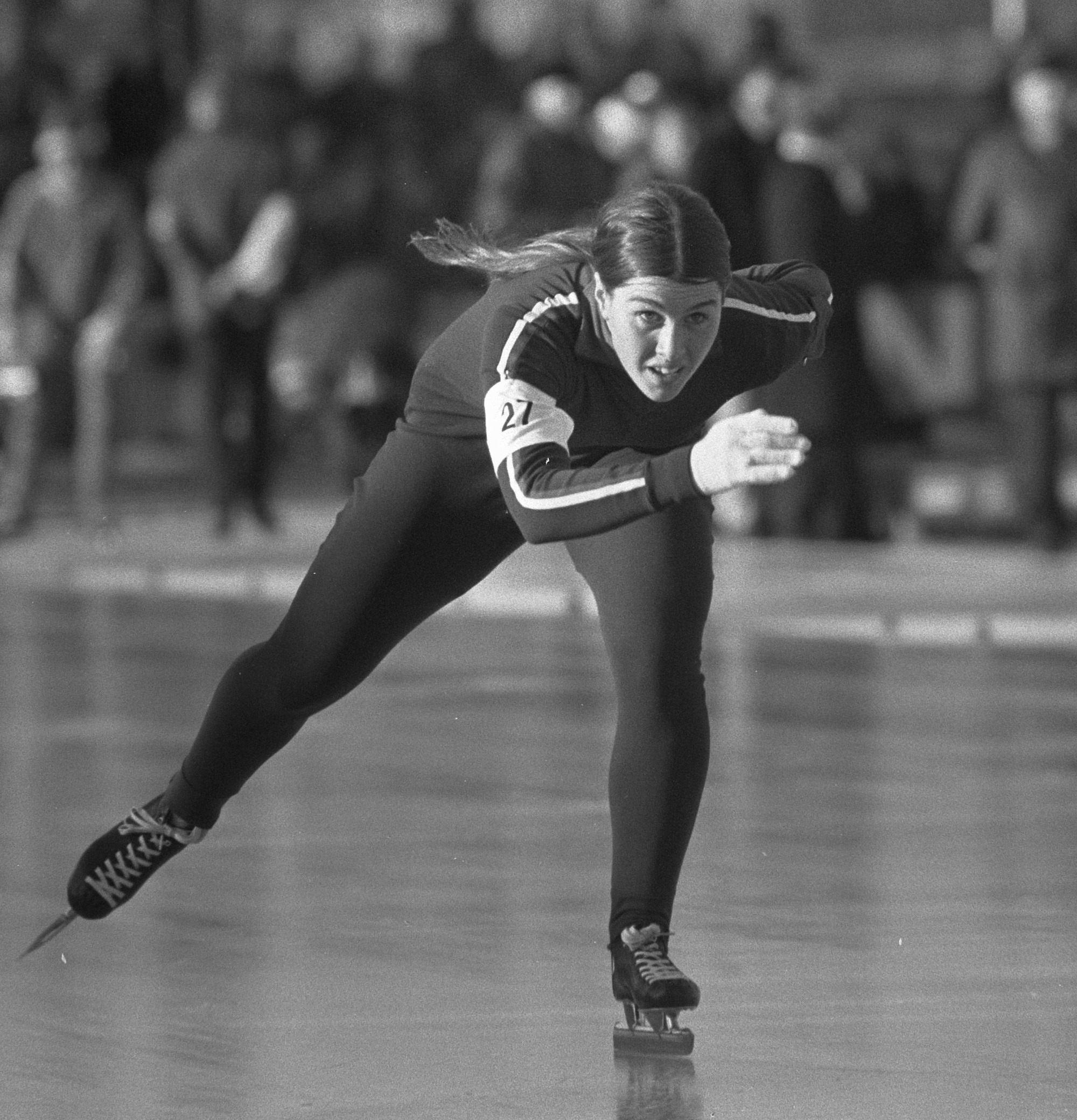
Sheila Young in 1974

Young competed at the 1972 Winter Olympics in Sapporo and saw her roommates Anne Henning and Dianne Holum win Olympic gold (Henning on the 500 m, as well as bronze on the 1,000 m, and Holum on the 1,500 m, as well as silver on the 3,000 m) – she herself finished fourth on the 500 m and seventeenth on the 1,000 m. In 1973, she became World Sprint Champion (a feat she would repeat in 1975 and 1976) and she skated two world records that year, becoming the first woman to skate the 500 m in less than 42 seconds. In 1975, she won bronze at the World Allround Championships (a feat she would repeat in 1976). In 1976, just before the Winter Olympics, she became the first woman to skate the 500 m in less than 41 seconds. At the 1976 Winter Olympics in Innsbruck, Young won three medals – gold on the 500 m (setting a new Olympic record), silver on the 1,500 m, and bronze on the 1,000 m. That same year, after the Winter Olympics, she would skate two more world records before retiring from speed skating. She briefly came out of retirement, participating in the World Sprint Championships in 1981 (finishing seventh) and 1982 (finishing thirteenth).

==== World records ====
Over the course of her career, Young skated five world records:

Event	Result	Date	Venue
500 m	41.8	19 January 1973	Davos
Sprint combination	173.450	20 January 1973	Davos
500 m	40.91	31 January 1976	Davos
500 m	40.68	13 March 1976	Inzell
Sprint combination	166.210	13 March 1976	Inzell

==== Personal records ====
To put these personal records in perspective, the WR column lists the official world records on the dates that Young skated her personal records.

Event	Result	Date	Venue	WR
500 m	40.68	13 March 1976	Inzell	40.91
1,000 m	1:24.38	13 March 1976	Inzell	1:23.46
1,500 m	2:14.68	31 January 1976	Davos	2:09.90
3,000 m	5:02.88	26 January 1976	Madonna di Campiglio	4:44.69

=== Track cycling ===
Young was United States sprint champion four times (1971, 1973, 1976, and 1981). At the UCI Track Cycling World Championships, she won bronze in 1972, silver in 1982, and became world sprint champion three times – in 1973 (breaking the Soviet Union's 15-year winning streak), 1976, and 1981. She retired in 1976, but resumed competing in 1981 to win one more United States sprint championship and beat her future sister-in-law, Connie Paraskevin, taking the gold in the sprint at the world championships in 1981. After winning silver at the 1982 world championship she retired for good, preferring motherhood over prolonging her sports careers.

If women's cycling was part of the summer Olympics of 1976 then Young would have a chance to win medals at both the Summer and Winter Olympics in the same year, something that Christa Rothenburger (also world sprint champion in both speed skating and track cycling) achieved in 1988.
