= Chieko Ito =

Japanese speed skater (born 1954)

Personal information
- Nationality: Japanese
- Born: 2 April 1954 (age 72) Fujimi, Nagano, Japan

Sport
- Sport: Speed skating

Chieko Ito (伊東 千恵子, Itō Chieko; born 2 April 1954) is a Japanese speed skater. She competed in two events at the 1976 Winter Olympics.
