= Netherlands at the 1976 Winter Olympics =

- Flag of the Netherlands
- IOC code: NED (HOL used at these Games)
- NOC: Dutch Olympic Committee

in Innsbruck
- Competitors: 7 (3 men, 4 women) in 2 sports
- Flag bearer: Dianne de Leeuw (figure skating)
- Medals Ranked 9th: Gold 1 Silver 2 Bronze 3 Total 6

Winter Olympics appearances (overview)
- 1928; 1932; 1936; 1948; 1952; 1956; 1960; 1964; 1968; 1972; 1976; 1980; 1984; 1988; 1992; 1994; 1998; 2002; 2006; 2010; 2014; 2018; 2022; 2026

Athletes from the Netherlands competed at the 1976 Winter Olympics in Innsbruck, Austria.

== Medalists ==
Medal	Name	Sport	Event
Gold	Piet Kleine	Speed skating	Men's 10,000 metres
Silver	Dianne de Leeuw	Figure skating	Women's singles
Silver	Piet Kleine	Speed skating	Men's 5000 metres
Bronze	Hans van Helden	Speed skating	Men's 1500 metres
Bronze	Hans van Helden	Speed skating	Men's 5000 metres
Bronze	Hans van Helden	Speed skating	Men's 10,000 metres

== Figure skating ==
Athlete	Event	CF	SP	FS	Points	Places	Final rank
Dianne de Leeuw	Women's singles	3	4	2	190.24	20	2nd place, silver medalist(s)

== Speed skating ==
Men

Event	Athlete	Race	
Event	Athlete	Time	Rank
500 m	Jan Bazen	39.78	6
500 m	Hans van Helden	40.91	19
1000 m	Hans van Helden	1:20.85	5
1000 m	Piet Kleine	1:23.00	18
1500 m	Hans van Helden	2:00.87	3rd place, bronze medalist(s)
1500 m	Piet Kleine	2:02.28	6
5000 m	Hans van Helden	7:26.54	3rd place, bronze medalist(s)
5000 m	Piet Kleine	7:26.47	2nd place, silver medalist(s)
10,000 m	Hans van Helden	15:02.02	3rd place, bronze medalist(s)
10,000 m	Piet Kleine	14:50.59 OR	1st place, gold medalist(s)

Women

Event	Athlete	Race	
Event	Athlete	Time	Rank
500 m	Annie Borckink	46.00	23
500 m	Christa Jaarsma	45.45	19
500 m	Sijtje van der Lende	46.06	24
1000 m	Annie Borckink	1:32.50	16
1000 m	Christa Jaarsma	1:34.63	23
1000 m	Sijtje van der Lende	1:31.66	11
1500 m	Annie Borckink	2:22.06	12
1500 m	Christa Jaarsma	2:23.98	16
1500 m	Sijtje van der Lende	2:22.10	13
3000 m	Annie Borckink	4:56.75	15
3000 m	Christa Jaarsma	5:00.08	20
3000 m	Sijtje van der Lende	4:50.86	9
