= Richard Cavanaugh =

American luger (born 1948)

Personal information
- Nationality: American
- Born: June 30, 1948 (age 78) Denver, Colorado, United States

Sport
- Sport: Luge

Richard Cavanaugh (born June 30, 1948) is an American luger. He competed at the 1972 Winter Olympics and the 1976 Winter Olympics.
