= Ines Bautzmann =

German speed skater

Personal information
- Nationality: German
- Born: 20 May 1958 (age 66); Dresden, East Germany

Sport
- Sport: Speed skating

Ines Pochert-Bautzmann (born 20 May 1958) is a German speed skater. She competed in three events at the 1976 Winter Olympics.
