= Linda Rombouts =

Belgian speed skater

Personal information
- Nationality: Belgian
- Born: 22 July 1953 (age 71); Antwerp, Belgium
- Website: https://www.lindarombouts.be/

Sport
- Sport: Speed skating, Track cycling, Road cycling

Linda Rombouts (born 22 July 1953) is a Belgian speed skater. She competed in three events at the 1976 Winter Olympics. Like many skaters, she also used the bicycle as fitness training. Rombouts participated in the World Road Championships on 27 August 1975. The year before, she became Belgian National Track Champion in the individual sprint.
