= Hans van Helden =

Dutch speed skater

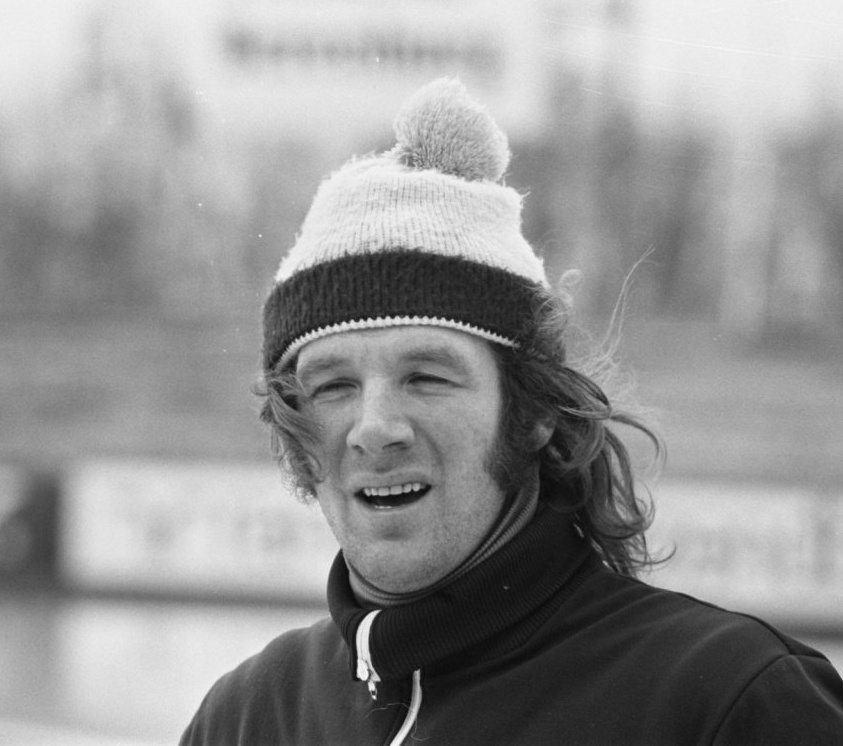
- Hans van Helden in 1975

Personal information
- Nationality: Dutch; French
- Born: 27 April 1948 (age 78) Almkerk, the Netherlands
- Height: 1.80 m (5 ft 11 in)
- Weight: 75 kg (165 lb)

Sport
- Country: Netherlands; France
- Sport: Speed skating
- Club: CEPG, Paris
- Turned pro: 1973
- Coached by: Frank Sverre Furuset, Marie-France Van Helden
- Retired: 1988

Achievements and titles
- Personal best(s): 500 m: 39.08 (1988); 1000 m: 1:16.32 (1988); 1500 m: 1:55.61 (1976); 3000 m: 4:08.11 (1984); 5000 m: 6:57.69 (1988); 10 000 m: 14:34.88 (1988)
Medal record
Representing Netherlands
Olympic Games
Bronze medal – third place	1976 Innsbruck	1,500 m
Bronze medal – third place	1976 Innsbruck	5,000 m
Bronze medal – third place	1976 Innsbruck	10,000 m
World Championships
Bronze medal – third place	1976 Heerenveen	Allround
European Championships
Silver medal – second place	1973 Grenoble	Allround
Bronze medal – third place	1974 Eskilstuna	Allround

Hans van Helden (born 27 April 1948) is a former speed skater, originally competing for the Netherlands, later for France.

== Life and career ==
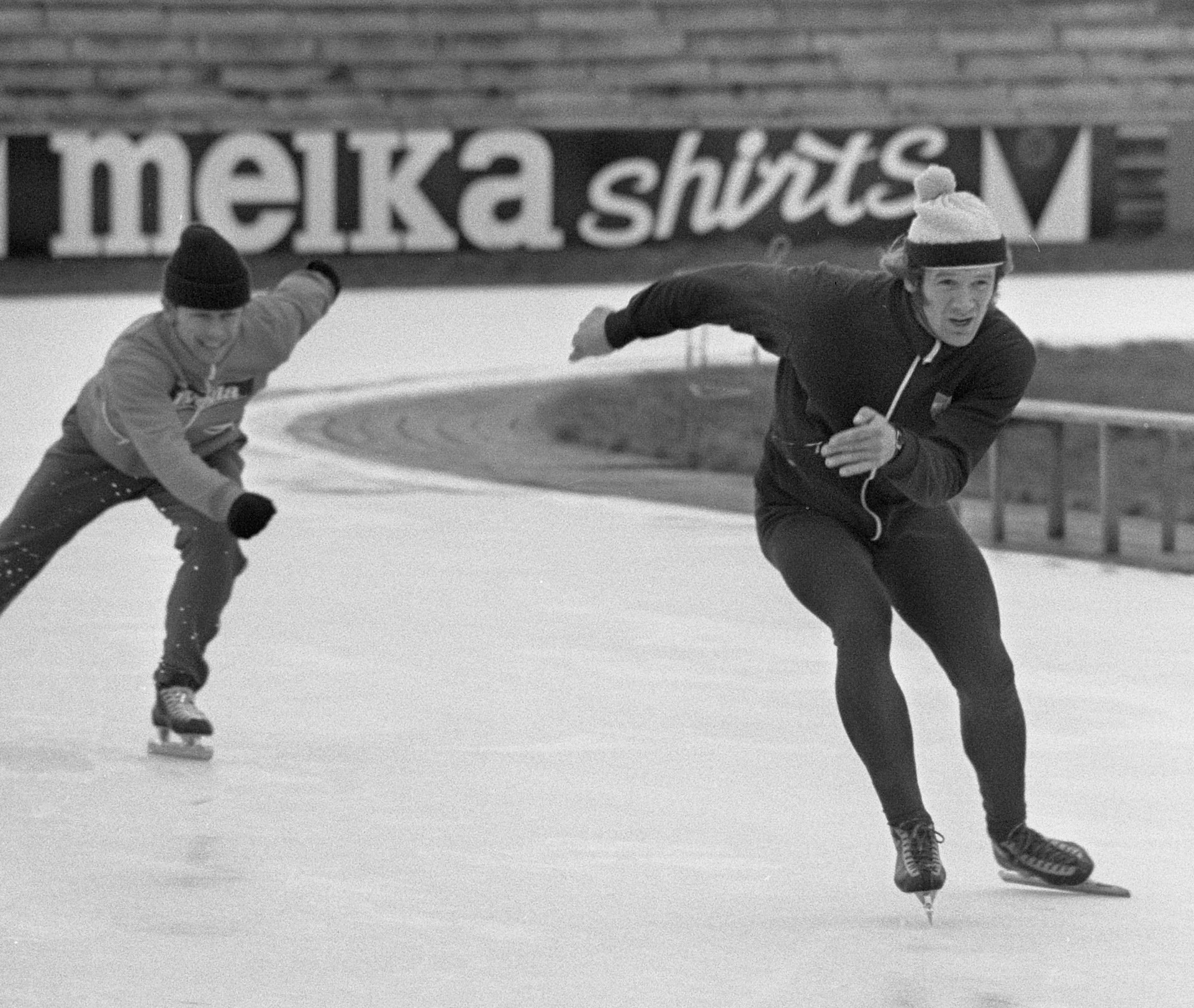
Hans van Helden with physical trainer Henk Gemser in 1975

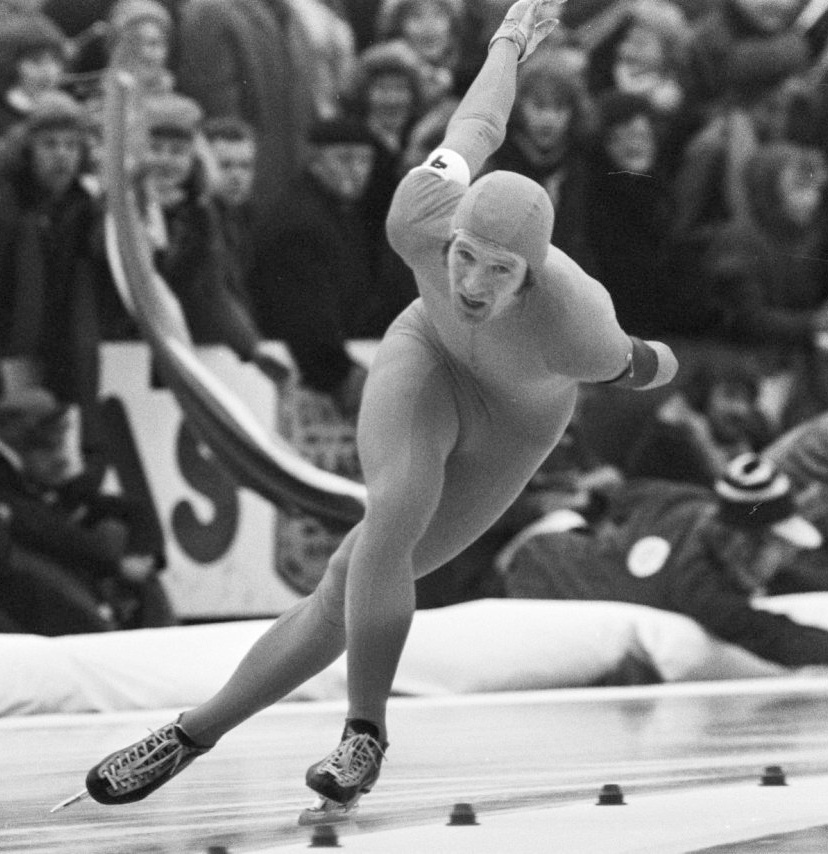
Hans van Helden in 1977

Despite being a very talented speed skater and having an excellent skating style and technique, Van Helden never won any major international tournaments. However, he did become Dutch Allround Champion twice (1976 and 1977) and he did break two world records. Being the then-current world record holder on the 5,000 m, he "only" finished 3rd on that distance during the 1976 Winter Olympics in Innsbruck, possibly because the ice was in much worse condition during his race than it was when his major rivals (Sten Stensen and Piet Kleine) ran theirs.

In Dutch skating, Van Helden was known as an enfant terrible. His clashes with fellow Dutch skaters, his being fed up with fighting the KNSB (Koninklijke Nederlandsche Schaatsenrijders Bond – the Royal Dutch Skaters Federation), and (in 1980) his marriage to a French skater (Marie-France Vives), led to his naturalisation to French citizenship in December 1981. As a Frenchman, having very little competition from other French skaters, he had no problems qualifying for skating events. This also resulted in a long career as a speed skater and he participated in international competitions until he was 40.

One of his most memorable feats was finishing 4th on the 1,500 m during the 1984 Winter Olympics in Sarajevo, aged 35, and well ahead of his former compatriots, Dutchmen Hilbert van der Duim, Frits Schalij, and Hein Vergeer.

== Records ==
=== Personal records ===
Personal records
Men's Speed skating
Event	Result	Date	Location	Notes
500 meter	39.00	5 January 1986	Davos	
1000 meter	1:16.32	18 February 1988	Calgary	
1500 meter	1:55.61	13 March 1976	Inzell	
3000 meter	4:08.11	8 March 1984	Inzell	
5000 meter	6:57.59	17 February 1988	Calgary	
10000 meter	14:34.84	21 February 1988	Calgary	
Big combination	165.385	6 March 1988	Medeo	

Van Helden was number one on the Adelskalender, the all-time allround speed skating ranking, from 13 March 1976 to 25 December 1976 – a total of 287 days. He has an Adelskalender score of 163.047 points.

=== World records ===
Over the course of his career, Van Helden skated two world records:

Event	Result	Date	Location	Note
5000 m	7:07.82	30 January 1976	Davos	World record until 5 March 1976
1500 m	1:55.61	13 March 1976	Inzell	World record until 20 March 1977

Source: SpeedSkatingStats.com

== Tournament overview ==
Season	Dutch Championships Allround	European Championships Allround	Olympic Games	World Championships Allround	World Championships Sprint
1970–71	AMSTERDAM DQ 500m 17th 5000m 12th 1500m DNQ 10000m NC overall				
1971–72	DEVENTER 4th 500m 13th 5000m 6th 1500m DNQ 10000m NC overall(13th)				
1972–73	HEERENVEEN (gold) 500m 5th 5000m (silver) 1500m 27th 10000m (bronze) overall	GRENOBLE 4th 500m 5th 5000m (silver) 1500m 6th 10000m (silver) overall		DEVENTER 25th 500m 5th 5000m 11th 1500m 6th 10000m 7th overall	OSLO 25th 500m 5th 1000m 24th 500m 8th 1000m 16th overall
1973–74	ASSEN 5th 500m 4th 5000m (silver) 1500m 5th 10000m 4th overall	ESKILSTUNA 10th 500m (gold) 5000m 6th 1500m (silver) 10000m (bronze) overall		INZELL 9th 500m 6th 5000m (gold) 1500m 12th 10000m 5th overall	INNSBRUCK 22nd 500m 6th 1000m 24th 500m (silver) 1000m 8th overall
1974–75					
1975–76	GRONINGEN (gold) 500m (gold) 5000m (gold) 1500m (silver) 10000m (gold) overall	OSLO 4th 500m 5th 5000m (bronze) 1500m 5th 10000m 5th overall	INNSBRUCK 19th 500m 5th 1000m (bronze) 1500m (bronze) 5000m (bronze) 10000m	HEERENVEEN 4th 500m (gold) 5000m 5th 1500m 10th 10000m (bronze) overall	WEST BERLIN 12th 500m (gold) 1000m 19th 500m (gold) 1000m 4th overall
1976–77	ASSEN (bronze) 500m (silver) 5000m (gold) 1500m (silver) 10000m (gold) overall	LARVIK 7th 500m 4th 5000m 6th 1500m 5th 10000m 5th overall		HEERENVEEN 12th 500m (gold) 5000m 7th 1500m 11th 10000m 7th overall	
1977–78	EINDHOVEN (gold) 500m 4th 5000m (bronze) 1500m DNS 10000m 12th overall	OSLO 4th 500m 13th 5000m 7th 1500m 15th 10000m 12th overall			
1978–79	HEERENVEEN 7th 500m (silver) 5000m 4th 1500m 5th 10000m 4th overall				
1979–80	THE HAGUE 8th 500m 5th 5000m (silver) 1500m 6th 10000m 4th overall	TRONDHEIM 13th 500m 13th 5000m 13th 1500m 15th 10000m 13th overall			
1980–81	ASSEN 4th 500m 9th 5000m 5th 1500m 11th 10000m 7th overall				
1981–82		OSLO 15th 500m 13th 5000m 9th 1500m 16th 10000m 15th overall		ASSEN 28th 500m 5th 5000m 15th 1500m 15th 10000m 15th overall	
1982–83		THE HAGUE 8th 500m 19th 5000m 13th 1500m DNQ 10000m NC overall (17th)		OSLO 13th 500m 15th 5000m 6th 1500m 16th 10000m 14th overall	
1983–84		LARVIK 13th 500m 10th 5000m (gold) 1500m 6th 10000m 6th overall	SARAJEVO 24th 500m 18th 1000m 4th 1500m 11th 5000m 25th 10000m	GOTHENBURG 8th 500m 22nd 5000m 7th 1500m 15th 10000m 10th overall	
1984–85		ESKILSTUNA 22nd 500m 24th 5000m 27th 1500m DNQ 10000m NC overall (26th)		HAMAR 33rd 500m 22nd 5000m 27th 1500m DNQ 10000m NC overall (27th)	
1985–86		OSLO 16th 500m 8th 5000m 14th 1500m 13th 10000m 14th overall		INZELL 19th 500m 12th 5000m 26th 1500m 10th 10000m 14th overall	
1986–87		TRONDHEIM 23rd 500m 24th 5000m 21st 1500m DNQ 10000m NC overall (24th)		HEERENVEEN 28th 500m 32nd 5000m 31st 1500m DNQ 10000m NC overall (31st)	
1987–88		THE HAGUE 14th 500m 18th 5000m 13th 1500m DNQ 10000m NC overall (18th)	CALGARY 33rd 500m 29th 1000m 19th 1500m 22nd 5000m 23rd 10000m	ALMA–ATA 30th 500m 7th 5000m 17th 1500m (bronze) 10000m 8th overall	

- NC = Did not qualify for the final distance; classification calculated from the three shorter distances
- DQ = Disqualified
- DNQ = Did not qualify for the final distance

== Medals won ==
Championship	Gold (gold)	Silver (silver)	Bronze (bronze)
Dutch Allround	8	7	3
European Allround	2	3	2
Olympic Games	0	0	3
World Allround	3	0	2
World Sprint	2	1	0
