= Lisbeth Korsmo =

Norwegian speed skater

Personal information
- Born: Lisbeth Berg; 14 January 1948 Oslo, Norway
- Died: 22 January 2017 (aged 69)

Sport
- Sport: Speed skating and cycling
Medal record
Representing Norway
Women's Speed skating
Olympic Games
Bronze medal – third place	1976 Innsbruck	3000 m

Lisbeth Korsmo (14 January 1948 – 22 January 2017) was a Norwegian speed skater, cyclist, and Olympic medalist. She received a bronze medal at the 1976 Winter Olympics in Innsbruck. She also won the Norwegian National Road Race Championship in 1981. She died on 22 January 2017 at the age of 69.
