= Peter Mueller (speed skater) =

American speed skater

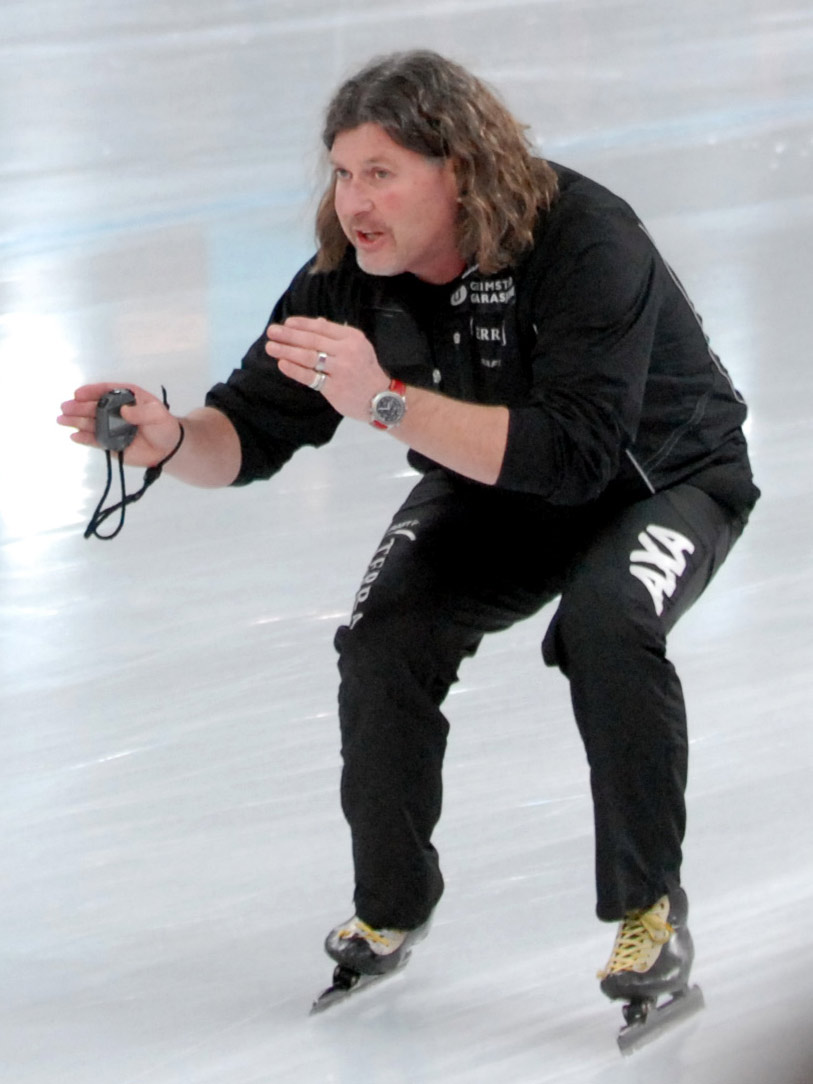
- Mueller in 2009 (photo: Bjarte Hetland)

Personal information
- Full name: Peter Alan Mueller
- Born: July 27, 1954 (age 71) Madison, Wisconsin, U.S.

Sport
- Sport: Speed skating
Medal record
Men's speed skating
Representing United States
Olympic Games
Gold medal – first place	1976 Innsbruck	1000 m
World Sprint Championships
Bronze medal – third place	1976 West Berlin	Sprint
Silver medal – second place	1977 Alkmaar	Sprint

Peter Alan Mueller (born July 27, 1954 in Madison, Wisconsin) is an American speed skating coach and former speed skater.

== Early life ==
Mueller attended La Follette High School.

== Skating career ==
Peter Mueller was the first Olympic Champion on the 1,000 m, when this distance was introduced at the 1976 Winter Olympics in Innsbruck. More international successes followed at the World Sprint Championships, where he won bronze in 1976 and silver in 1977. His last appearance as a speed skater was at the 1980 Winter Olympics in Lake Placid, where he placed 5th in the 1,000 m, 1.93 seconds behind the winning time of Eric Heiden.

== Coaching ==
After ending his speed skating career, Mueller became a very successful skating coach. He was the coach of Bonnie Blair when she won two gold medals at the 1992 Winter Olympics, Dan Jansen when he won gold at the 1994 Winter Olympics, Marianne Timmer (two gold medals) and Jan Bos (silver) at the 1998 Winter Olympics, and Gianni Romme (silver) at the 2002 Winter Olympics. In addition, several speed skaters winning a total of five World Sprint Championships, one World Allround Championships, and one European Allround Championships titles were also coached by him.

Since the 2003/2004 season, Mueller was the coach of the Norwegian team. He quickly added to his list of successes as a coach when, at the World Single Distance Championships of 2005 in Inzell, Even Wetten (on the 1,000 m) and Rune Stordal (on the 1500 m) became World Champions.

Mueller was fired as coach of the Norwegian team in November 2009, due to allegations of harassment of skater Maren Haugli.

== Private life ==
Mueller was married to American speed skater Leah Poulos, two times World Sprint Champion and three times Olympic silver medalist, and had two children. Later, he married Dutch speed skater Marianne Timmer. He and Timmer are now divorced.

An autobiography, called Op dun ijs ("On thin ice"), was published in the Netherlands in 2006.
