= Tatyana Averina =

Soviet Speed skater

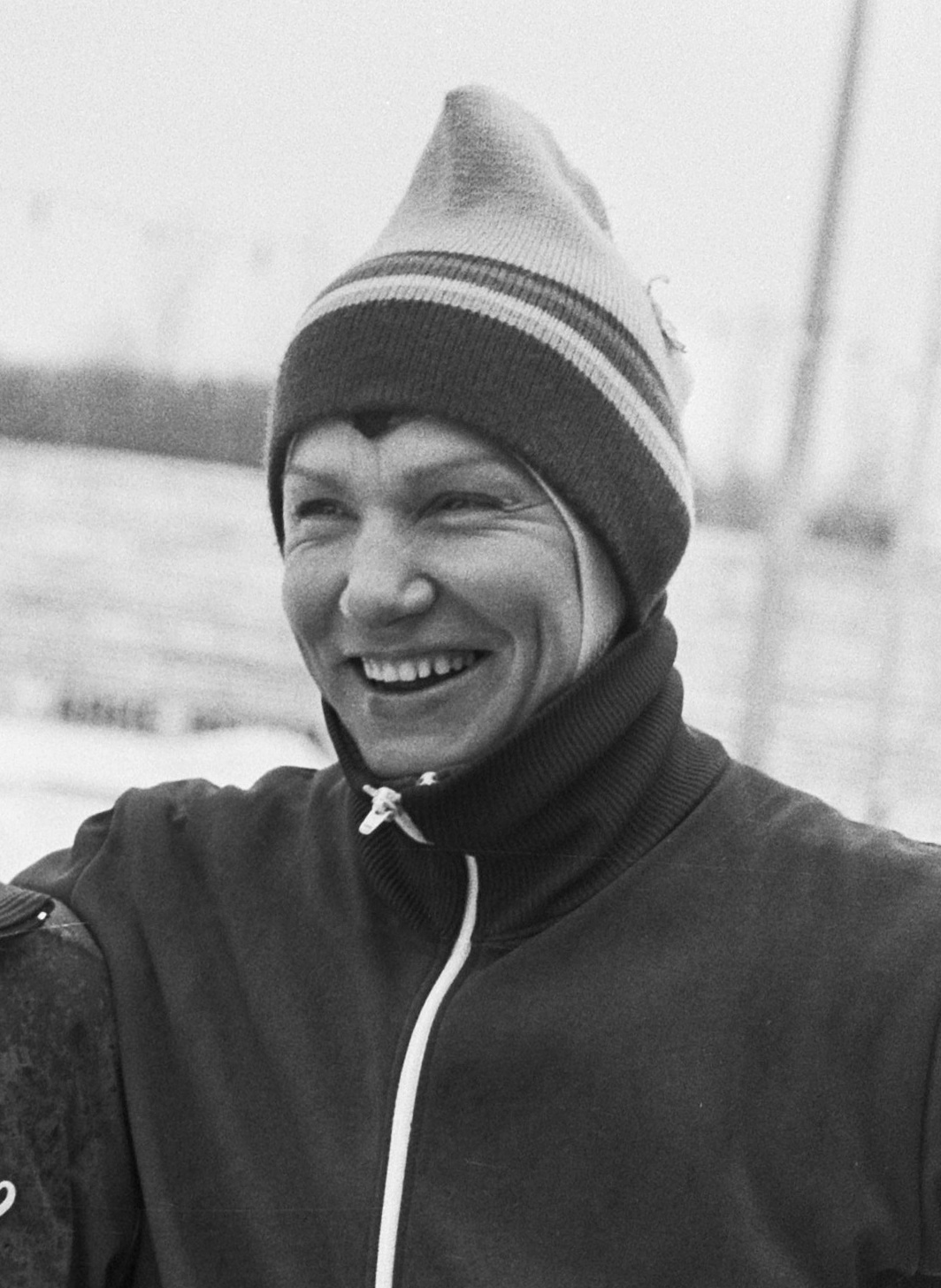
- Tatyana Averina in 1979

Personal information
- Born: 25 June 1950 Nizhny Novgorod, Russian SFSR, Soviet Union
- Died: 22 August 2001 (aged 51) Moscow, Russia
- Height: 1.65 m (5 ft 5 in)
- Weight: 61 kg (134 lb)

Sport
- Sport: Speed skating
- Club: Burevestnik
Medal record
Representing Soviet Union
Olympic Games
Gold medal – first place	1976 Innsbruck	1,000 m
Gold medal – first place	1976 Innsbruck	3,000 m
Bronze medal – third place	1976 Innsbruck	500 m
Bronze medal – third place	1976 Innsbruck	1,500 m
World Championships
Silver medal – second place	1974 Heerenveen	Allround
Silver medal – second place	1975 Assen	Allround
Silver medal – second place	1976 Gjøvik	Allround
Gold medal – first place	1978 Helsinki	Allround

Tatyana Borisovna Averina (Russian: Татья́на Бори́совна Аве́рина; 25 June 1950 – 22 August 2001) was a Soviet Russian speed skater. After getting married, her name also appeared as Tatyana Barabash (Russian: Татьяна Барабаш).

== Biography ==
Averina was trained by Boris Stenin at Burevestnik Voluntary Sports Society in Gorky. In 1970 she was selected for the USSR National Team. She finished in 12th place at the 1970 World All-around Championships and the next year won a bronze medal in the 1,000 m at European Championships. In 1972, she won the 500 m event at the Winter Universiade.

Between 1974 and 1975 Averina broke world records eleven times: four times in the 1000 m, twice in the 1,500 m, twice in the 500 m and three times in the mini combination. In 1976 she earned the title Honoured Master of Sports of the USSR. She participated in the 1976 Winter Olympics in Innsbruck and won medals (two gold and two bronze) on all four distances. The Swiss newspaper Sport had written shortly before the Olympic Games, "Narrow specialisation has solidly taken root in the skating sport and these days it will be very hard to find an athlete who will compete in all distances and achieve successes in all, similar to Clas Thunberg and Lidia Skoblikova."

Averina took part in the 1980 Winter Olympics in Lake Placid, but did not win any medal. After having won 3 silver medals in earlier years (1974, 1975 and 1976), Averina became World Allround Champion in 1978. In 1979, she became Soviet Allround Champion. Earlier, she had become Soviet Sprint Champion three times (1973, 1974 and 1975).

== Medals ==
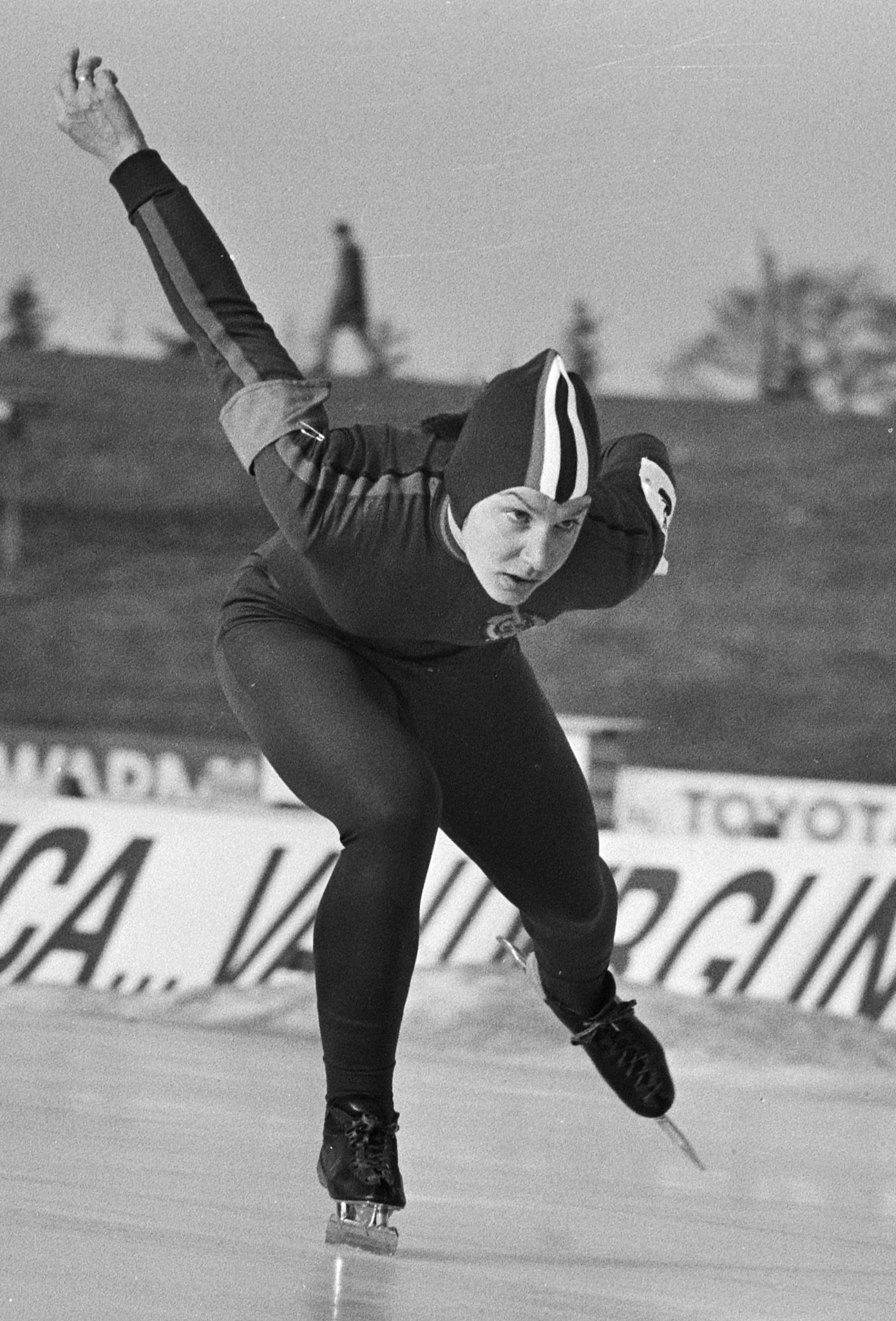
Tatyana Averina in 1975

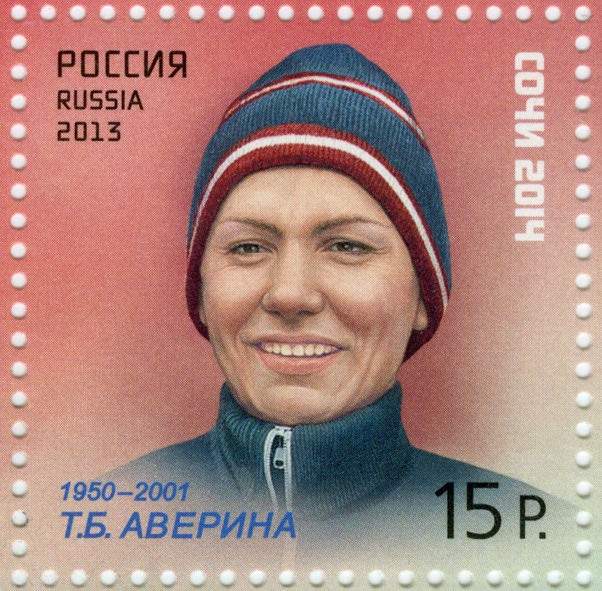
Tatyana Averina on a 2013 Russian stamp from the series "Sports Legends"

An overview of medals won by Averina at important championships she participated in, listing the years in which she won each:

Championships	Gold medal	Silver medal	Bronze medal
Winter Olympics	1976 (1,000 m); 1976 (3,000 m)	–	1976 (500 m); 1976 (1,500 m)
World Allround	1978	1974; 1975; 1976	–
World Sprint	–	–	–
European Allround	–	–	–
Soviet Allround	1979	–	–
Soviet Sprint	1973; 1974; 1975	–	–

== World records ==
Over the course of her career, Averina skated eleven world records:

Event	Result	Date	Venue
1,500 m	2:14.00	1 April 1974	Medeo
1,000 m	1:26.40	2 April 1974	Medeo
Mini combination	180.089	2 April 1974	Medeo
500 m	41.70	11 March 1975	Medeo
1,500 m	2:09.90	11 March 1975	Medeo
1,000 m	1:26.12	12 March 1975	Medeo
Mini combination	176.930	12 March 1975	Medeo
1,000 m	1:25.28	22 March 1975	Medeo
500 m	41.06	29 March 1975	Medeo
1,000 m	1:23.46	29 March 1975	Medeo
Sprint combination	168.285	29 March 1975	Medeo

== Personal records ==
To put these personal records in perspective, the WR column lists the official world records on the dates that Averina skated her personal records.

Event	Result	Date	Venue	WR
500 m	41.06	29 March 1975	Medeo	41.69
1,000 m	1:23.3	2 October 1979	Medeo	1:23.46
1,500 m	2:07.88	12 January 1979	Medeo	2:07.18
3,000 m	4:38.48	13 January 1979	Medeo	4:31.00
5,000 m	9:04.9	29 November 1981	Moscow	9:01.6

Note that Averina's personal record on the 3,000 m was not a recognised as a world record by the International Skating Union (ISU). Also note that the 5,000 m was suspended as a world record event at the 1955 ISU Congress and was reinstated at the 1982 ISU Congress.

Averina has an Adelskalender score of 184.589.
