= Cindy Seikkula =

American speed skater

Personal information
- Born: March 26, 1958 (age 66); Duluth, Minnesota, United States

Sport
- Sport: Speed skating

Cindy Seikkula (born March 26, 1958) is an American speed skater. She competed in two events at the 1976 Winter Olympics.
