= Christa Jaarsma =

Dutch speed skater

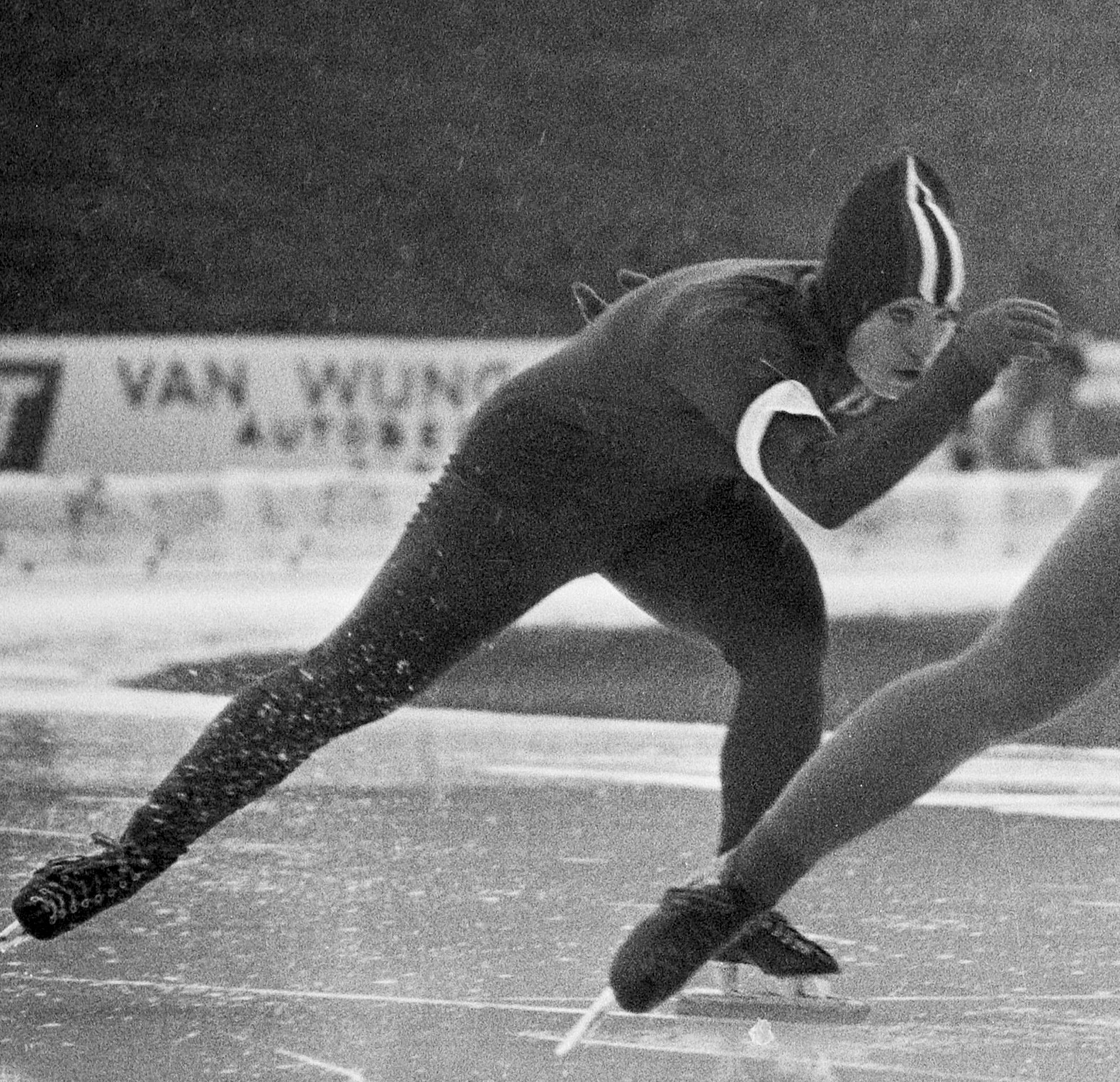
- Christa Jaarsma in 1976

Personal information
- Born: 15 October 1952 (age 73) Almelo, Netherlands

Sport
- Country: Netherlands
- Sport: Speed skating

Christina "Christa" Jaarsma (born 15 October 1952) is a retired speed skater from the Netherlands. She competed at the 1976 Winter Olympics in 500, 1000, 1500 and 3000 m and finished in 19th, 23rd, 16th and 20th place, respectively.

Personal bests:

- 500 m – 45.15 (1976)
- 1000 m – 1:28.10 (1976)
- 1500 m – 2:16.97 (1976)
- 3000 m – 4:52.05 (1976)
