= Sijtje van der Lende =

Dutch speed skater (born 1950)

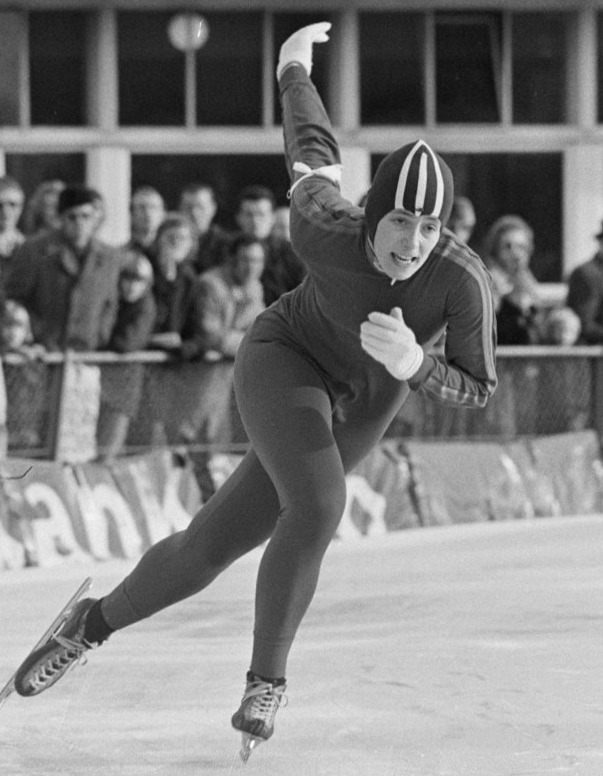
- van de Lende in 1976

Personal information
- Born: 31 January 1950 (age 76) Sonnega, Netherlands
- Height: 1.75 m (5 ft 9 in)
- Weight: 66 kg (146 lb)

Sport
- Sport: Speed skating

Sijtje van der Lende (born 31 January 1950) is a former speed skater from the Netherlands and a skating coach. She competed at the 1976 and 1980 Winter Olympics in all distances from 500 to 3000 m. Her best achievement was ninth place in the 3000 m in 1976.

She won the national allround title in 1976 and 1977 and finished in third place in 1974, 1975, 1978 and 1980.

Personal bests:

- 500 m – 43.66 (1980)
- 1000 m – 1:25.86 (1980)
- 1500 m – 2:12.59 (1979)
- 3000 m – 4:39.15 (1977)
- 5000 m – 8:25.3 (1982)

After retirement she worked as a skating coach with various teams in the Netherlands, and in 1994 became the first female national coach. Her last professional speed skating team was VPZ (2005–2008). From 2008 till the Olympic winter games at Vancouver in 2010 she works with the national team of China. At the moment she's advisor for Topteam North Netherlands, a group of talented young speed skaters in this district.
