= Mike Woods (speed skater) =

American speed skater

Personal information
- Nationality: American
- Born: May 15, 1952 (age 74) Milwaukee, Wisconsin, United States

Sport
- Sport: Speed skating

Mike Woods (born May 15, 1952) is an American speed skater. He competed at the 1976 Winter Olympics, the 1980 Winter Olympics and the 1984 Winter Olympics.
