= Charles Gilmore (speed skater) =

American speed skater

Personal information
- Born: January 27, 1950 (age 76) Orange, California, United States

Sport
- Sport: Speed skating

Charles Gilmore (born January 27, 1950) is an American speed skater. He competed at the 1972 Winter Olympics and the 1976 Winter Olympics.
