= Norway at the 1976 Winter Olympics =

- IOC code: NOR
- NOC: Norwegian Olympic Committee

in Innsbruck
- Competitors: 42 (35 men, 7 women) in 7 sports
- Flag bearer: Pål Tyldum (Cross-country skiing)
- Medals Ranked 4th: Gold 3 Silver 3 Bronze 1 Total 7

Winter Olympics appearances (overview)
- 1924; 1928; 1932; 1936; 1948; 1952; 1956; 1960; 1964; 1968; 1972; 1976; 1980; 1984; 1988; 1992; 1994; 1998; 2002; 2006; 2010; 2014; 2018; 2022; 2026

Norway competed at the 1976 Winter Olympics in Innsbruck, Austria.

== Medalists ==
Medal	Name	Sport	Event
Gold	Ivar Formo	Cross-country skiing	Men's 50 km (classical)
Gold	Jan Egil Storholt	Speed skating	Men's 1500m
Gold	Sten Stensen	Speed skating	Men's 5000m
Silver	Pål Tyldum; Einar Sagstuen; Ivar Formo; Odd Martinsen	Cross-country skiing	Men's 4 × 10 km relay
Silver	Jørn Didriksen	Speed skating	Men's 1000m
Silver	Sten Stensen	Speed skating	Men's 10,000m
Bronze	Lisbeth Korsmo	Speed skating	Women's 3000m

== Alpine skiing ==
Men

Athlete	Event	Race 1		Race 2		Total	
Athlete	Event	Time	Rank	Time	Rank	Time	Rank
Erik Håker	Downhill					1:49.19	25
Erik Håker	Giant Slalom	DNF	–	–	–	DNF	–
Odd Sørli	Giant Slalom	DNF	–	–	–	DNF	–
Odd Sørli	Slalom	DNF	–	–	–	DNF	–
Erik Håker	Slalom	1:06.77	30	1:11.09	29	2:17.86	26

Women

Athlete	Event	Race 1		Race 2		Total	
Athlete	Event	Time	Rank	Time	Rank	Time	Rank
Torill Fjeldstad	Downhill					1:52.99	27
Torill Fjeldstad	Giant Slalom					1:36.00	31
Torill Fjeldstad	Slalom	50.11	19	DNF	–	DNF	–

== Biathlon ==
Men

Event	Athlete	Time	Penalties	Adjusted time ^{1}	Rank
20 km	Svein Engen	1'14:27.24	7	1'21:27.24	20
20 km	Kjell Hovda	1'16:24.45	5	1'21:24.45	18
20 km	Tor Svendsberget	1'15:10.13	3	1'18:10.13	9

^{1} One minute added per close miss (a hit in the outer ring), two minutes added per complete miss.

Men's 4 x 7.5 km relay

Athletes	Race		
Athletes	Misses ^{2}	Time	Rank
Kjell Hovda; Terje Hanssen; Svein Engen; Tor Svendsberget	6	2'05:10.28	5

^{2} A penalty loop of 200 metres had to be skied per missed target.

== Cross-country skiing ==
Men

Event	Athlete	Race	
Event	Athlete	Time	Rank
15 km	Magne Myrmo	49:26.89	55
15 km	Pål Tyldum	46:50.57	20
15 km	Odd Martinsen	45:41.33	8
15 km	Ivar Formo	45:29.11	5
30 km	Magne Myrmo	1'35:33.34	23
30 km	Oddvar Brå	1'34:59.57	19
30 km	Ivar Formo	1'33:01.68	11
30 km	Odd Martinsen	1'32:38.91	9
50 km	Oddvar Brå	DNF	–
50 km	Pål Tyldum	2'42:21.86	7
50 km	Per Knut Aaland	2'41:18.06	6
50 km	Ivar Formo	2'37:30.05	1st place, gold medalist(s)

Men's 4 × 10 km relay

Athletes	Race	
Athletes	Time	Rank
Pål Tyldum; Einar Sagstuen; Ivar Formo; Odd Martinsen	2'09:58.36	2nd place, silver medalist(s)

Women

Event	Athlete	Race	
Event	Athlete	Time	Rank
5 km	Berit Johannessen	17:04.25	20
5 km	Marit Myrmæl	17:02.21	18
5 km	Berit Kvello	16:57.12	17
5 km	Grete Kummen	16:35.43	8
10 km	Marit Myrmæl	32:47.21	24
10 km	Berit Johannessen	32:46.76	23
10 km	Berit Kvello	32:17.60	18
10 km	Grete Kummen	32:02.59	15

Women's 4 × 5 km relay

Athletes	Race	
Athletes	Time	Rank
Berit Kvello; Marit Myrmæl; Berit Johannessen; Grete Kummen	1'11:09.08	5

== Luge ==
Men

Athlete	Run 1		Run 2		Run 3		Run 4		Total	
Athlete	Time	Rank	Time	Rank	Time	Rank	Time	Rank	Time	Rank
Bjørn Dyrdahl	1:04.969	39	54.185	22	53.911	22	53.979	19	3:47.044	36
Christian Strøm	55.125	25	54.603	24	54.347	24	54.717	24	3:38.792	22
Morten Nordeide Johansen	54.460	20	53.889	19	54.155	23	54.365	22	3:36.879	20

(Men's) Doubles

Athletes	Run 1		Run 2		Total	
Athletes	Time	Rank	Time	Rank	Time	Rank
Asle Strand; Helge Svensen	44.097	14	44.357	14	1:28.454	13
Martin Ore; Eilif Nedberg	44.744	15	44.534	15	1:29.278	15

== Nordic combined ==
Events:

- normal hill ski jumping (Three jumps, best two counted and shown here.)
- 15 km cross-country skiing

Athlete	Event	Ski Jumping				Cross-country			Total	
Athlete	Event	Distance 1	Distance 2	Points	Rank	Time	Points	Rank	Points	Rank
Stein Erik Gullikstad	Individual	62.0	66.5	162.1	31	49:04.07	210.62	2	372.72	22
Tom Sandberg	Individual	70.0	74.5	195.7	17	49:09.34	209.83	4	405.53	8
Arne Bystøl	Individual	66.5	69.0	166.5	30	51:02.81	192.81	17	359.31	27
Pål Schjetne	Individual	76.0	76.0	204.4	7	50:26.97	198.19	12	402.59	9

== Ski jumping ==
Athlete	Event	Jump 1		Jump 2		Total	
Athlete	Event	Distance	Points	Distance	Points	Points	Rank
Per Bergerud	Normal hill	72.5	100.3	74.0	103.7	204.0	43
Odd Hammernes	Normal hill	74.5	103.5	75.0	104.8	208.3	33
Finn Halvorsen	Normal hill	75.0	103.8	74.5	102.5	206.3	37
Johan Sætre	Normal hill	78.0	112.6	76.0	109.9	222.5	18
Odd Hammernes	Large hill	78.5	78.4	71.0	63.9	142.3	50
Per Bergerud	Large hill	84.0	89.6	84.0	90.1	179.7	26
Finn Halvorsen	Large hill	85.0	90.0	83.0	83.2	173.2	35
Johan Sætre	Large hill	88.0	99.2	85.0	96.0	195.2	13

== Speed skating ==
Men

Event	Athlete	Race	
Event	Athlete	Time	Rank
500 m	Jan Egil Storholt	1:18.00	28
500 m	Kay Arne Stenshjemmet	40.94	21
500 m	Arnulf Sunde	39.78	6
1000 m	Kay Arne Stenshjemmet	1:24.71	22
1000 m	Terje Andersen	1:22.92	16
1000 m	Jørn Didriksen	1:20.45	2nd place, silver medalist(s)
1500 m	Terje Andersen	2:04.65	15
1500 m	Kay Arne Stenshjemmet	2:03.75	11
1500 m	Jan Egil Storholt	1:59.38 OR	1st place, gold medalist(s)
5000 m	Amund Sjøbrend	7:48.28	13
5000 m	Jan Egil Storholt	7:40.60	9
5000 m	Sten Stensen	7:24.48	1st place, gold medalist(s)
10,000 m	Jan Egil Storholt	16:06.37	14
10,000 m	Amund Sjøbrend	15:43.29	10
10,000 m	Sten Stensen	14:53.30	2nd place, silver medalist(s)

Women

Event	Athlete	Race	
Event	Athlete	Time	Rank
500 m	Sigrid Sundby-Dybedahl	45.00	16
1000 m	Sigrid Sundby-Dybedahl	1:33.05	18
1500 m	Sigrid Sundby-Dybedahl	2:21.85	11
1500 m	Lisbeth Korsmo-Berg	2:18.99	4
3000 m	Lisbeth Korsmo-Berg	4:45.24	3rd place, bronze medalist(s)
