= 1984 Winter Olympics national flag bearers =

During the Parade of Nations section of the 1984 Winter Olympics opening ceremony, athletes from the participating countries marched into the arena. Each delegation was led by a flag bearer and a sign with the name of the country on it. The Parade of Nations was organized in Serbo-Croatian, the official language in Yugoslavia. As tradition dictates, Greece led the parade and Yugoslavia was the last to march to the stadium as the host nation. Two nations were unable to march with their respective national flags, namely British Virgin Islands and Chinese Taipei. While Chinese Taipei was unable to use their flag and the name "Republic of China" due to participation of People's Republic of China, British Virgin Islands team was forced to use a replacement flag. The replacement flag is a white-colored cloth with the words “B. Djevičanska Ostrva” in blue color and the Olympic Rings on it. The organizers were unable to create the flag and created the replacement flag for the opening ceremony.

== List ==
Order	Nation	Serbo-Croatian	Flag bearer	Sport
1	Greece	Grčka	Andreas Pantelidis	Alpine skiing
2	Andorra	Andora	Albert Llovera	Alpine skiing
3	Argentina	Argentina	Teresa Bustamente	Alpine skiing
4	Australia	Australija	Colin Coates	Speed skating
5	Austria	Austrija	Franz Klammer	Alpine skiing
6	Belgium	Belgija	Henri Mollin	Alpine skiing
7	Bolivia	Bolivija		
8	British Virgin Islands	BD Ostrva (Note: Britanska Djevičanska Ostrva)	Erroll Fraser	Speed skating
9	Bulgaria	Bugarska	Vladimir Velichkov	Biathlon
10	Czechoslovakia	Čehoslovačka	Jiří Králík	Ice hockey
11	Chile	Čile	Alfredo Maturana	Official
12	North Korea	DNR Koreja (Note: Demokratska Narodna Republika Koreja)	Im Ri-bin	Speed skating
13	Egypt	Egipat	Jamil El-Reedy	Alpine skiing
14	Finland	Finska	Jorma Valtonen	Ice hockey
15	France	Francuska	Yvon Mougel	Biathlon
16	Netherlands	Holandija	Hilbert van der Duim	Speed skating
17	Iceland	Island	Nanna Leifsdóttir	Alpine skiing
18	Italy	Italija	Paul Hildgartner	Luge
19	Japan	Japan	Tadayuki Takahashi	Figure skating
20	Canada	Kanada	Gaétan Boucher	Speed skating
21	Cyprus	Kipar		
22	South Korea	Koreja		
23	Costa Rica	Kostarika		
24	Lebanon	Libanon		
25	Liechtenstein	Lihtenštajn	Günther Marxer	Alpine skiing
26	Hungary	Mađarska	Gábor Mayer	Biathlon
27	Morocco	Maroko		
28	Mexico	Meksiko		
29	Monaco	Monako	David Lajoux	Alpine skiing
30	Mongolia	Mongolija	Luvsandashiin Dorj	Cross-country skiing
31	China	NR Kina (Note: Narodna Republika Kina)	Zhao Shijian	Speed skating
32	Norway	Norveška	Bjørg Eva Jensen	Speed skating
33	New Zealand	Novi Zeland	Markus Hubrich	Alpine skiing
34	East Germany	Njemačka DR (Note: Njemačka Demokratska Republika)	Frank Ullrich	Biathlon
35	Poland	Poljska	Józef Łuszczek	Cross-country skiing
36	Puerto Rico	Portoriko	George Tucker	Luge
37	Romania	Rumunija	Dorel Cristudor	Bobsleigh
38	San Marino	San Marino		
39	Soviet Union	SSSR (Note: Savez Sovjetskih Socijalističkih Republika)	Vladislav Tretiak	Ice hockey
40	West Germany	SR Njemačka (Note: Savezna Republika Njemačka)	Monika Pflug	Speed skating
41	Senegal	Senegal	Lamine Guèye	Alpine skiing
42	United States	SAD (Note: Sjedinjene Američke Države)	Frank Masley	Luge
43	Spain	Spanija	Blanca Fernández Ochoa	Alpine skiing
44	Switzerland	Švajcarska	Erika Hess	Alpine skiing
45	Sweden	Švedska	Mats Waltin	Ice hockey
46	Chinese Taipei	Tajpej Kinejski	Ueng Ming-yih	Cross-country skiing
47	Turkey	Turska		
48	Great Britain	Velika Britanija	Christopher Dean	Figure skating
49	Yugoslavia	Jugoslavija	Jure Franko	Alpine skiing
