= Luge at the 1984 Winter Olympics – Men's singles =

Men's singles at the XIV Olympic Winter Games
- Venue: Sarajevo Olympic Bobsleigh and Luge Track
- Dates: 9–12 February 1984
- Competitors: 32 from 16 nations
- Winning time: 3:04.549

Medalists
1st place, gold medalist(s)		Paul Hildgartner	Italy
2nd place, silver medalist(s)		Sergey Danilin	Soviet Union
3rd place, bronze medalist(s)		Valery Dudin	Soviet Union

The men's singles luge competition at the 1984 Winter Olympics in Sarajevo was held from 9 to 12 February, at Sarajevo Olympic Bobsleigh and Luge Track.

== Results ==
Rank	Athlete	Country	Run 1	Run 2	Run 3	Run 4	Total
1st place, gold medalist(s)	Paul Hildgartner	Italy	46.182	46.271	45.871	45.934	3:04.258
2nd place, silver medalist(s)	Sergey Danilin	Soviet Union	46.433	46.284	46.176	46.069	3:04.962
3rd place, bronze medalist(s)	Valery Dudin	Soviet Union	46.385	46.334	46.201	46.092	3:05.012
4	Michael Walter	East Germany	46.196	46.305	46.358	46.172	3:05.031
5	Torsten Görlitzer	East Germany	46.177	46.205	46.571	46.176	3:05.129
6	Ernst Haspinger	Italy	46.157	46.562	46.438	46.170	3:05.327
7	Yury Kharchenko	Soviet Union	46.310	46.469	46.337	46.432	3:05.548
8	Markus Prock	Austria	46.458	46.571	46.345	46.465	3:05.839
9	Norbert Huber	Italy	46.888	46.629	46.265	46.127	3:05.909
10	Gerhard Sandbichler	Austria	46.601	46.613	46.542	46.697	3:06.453
11	Wolfgang Schädler	Liechtenstein	46.815	47.019	46.654	46.509	3:06.997
12	Thomas Rzeznizok	West Germany	46.704	46.970	47.154	46.539	3:07.367
13	Norbert Loch	East Germany	46.784	46.886	47.214	46.830	3:07.714
14	Frank Masley	United States	46.890	47.073	46.797	46.990	3:07.750
15	Georg Fluckinger	Austria	47.552	47.000	46.989	46.448	3:07.989
16	Dušan Dragojević	Yugoslavia	47.480	47.332	47.465	47.338	3:09.615
17	David Gilman	United States	47.341	48.178	47.151	47.187	3:09.857
18	Martin Förster	Czechoslovakia	47.691	47.718	47.756	47.528	3:10.693
19	Fredrik Wickman	Sweden	47.693	47.850	47.808	47.579	3:10.930
20	Takashi Takagi	Japan	48.402	47.527	47.877	47.329	3:11.135
21	Timothy Nardiello	United States	47.899	47.799	47.784	47.838	3:11.320
22	Asle Strand	Norway	48.567	47.629	47.784	47.573	3:11.553
23	Stanislav Ptáčník	Czechoslovakia	48.133	47.746	47.706	48.060	3:11.645
24	Tsukasa Hirakawa	Japan	47.732	48.015	47.776	48.241	3:11.764
25	Sun Kuang-Ming	Chinese Taipei	50.090	48.080	49.174	47.946	3:15.290
26	Mike Howard	Great Britain	50.415	50.090	48.343	48.315	3:17.163
27	André Usborne	Great Britain	49.901	49.853	49.447	48.438	3:17.639
28	Suad Karajica	Yugoslavia	54.075	48.293	47.797	48.123	3:18.288
29	Chris Prentice	Great Britain	50.033	50.074	50.384	49.283	3:19.774
30	George Tucker	Puerto Rico	53.962	52.097	53.271	52.873	3:32.203
-	Johannes Schettel	West Germany	47.318	47.071	46.947	DQ	-
-	Ioan Apostol	Romania	46.388	DQ	-	-	-
