= Dušan Dragojević =

Bosnian luger (born 1960)

Personal information
- Nationality: Bosnian
- Born: 8 December 1960 (age 64); Sarajevo, Yugoslavia

Sport
- Country: Yugoslavia
- Sport: Luge

Dušan Dragojević (born 8 December 1960) is a Bosnian luger. He competed for Yugoslavia in the men's singles event at the 1984 Winter Olympics.
