= Ueng Ming-yih =

Taiwanese skier

Personal information
- Nationality: Taiwanese
- Born: 1 July 1952 (age 73)

Sport
- Sport: Biathlon, cross-country skiing

Ueng Ming-yih (traditional Chinese: 翁明義; simplified Chinese: 翁明义; born 1 July 1952) is a Taiwanese skier. He competed at the 1976 Winter Olympics and the 1984 Winter Olympics.

Ueng is from Tongxiao, Miaoli County. He received a mechanical engineering degree from Taichung Municipal Dajia Industrial High School in 1969.

To train for the 1980 Winter Olympics, he took skiing lessons in Austria. In 1978, he focused on a daily run of 10 km. As a substitute for skiis, he used a pulley board to practice skiing while travelling. While training in Austria, Ueng learned Standard German.

Ueng is also known for designing the Plum Blossom Banner, the flag used to represent Chinese Taipei Olympic Committee at the Olympic Games. He later became the first person to carry the newly-created flag at the opening ceremony of 1984 Winter Olympics in Sarajevo.
