= Thomas Rzeznizok =

German luger (born 1957)

Personal information
- Nationality: German
- Born: 29 March 1957 (age 68); Selm, West Germany

Sport
- Sport: Luge

Thomas Rzeznizok (born 29 March 1957) is a German luger. He competed in the men's singles event at the 1984 Winter Olympics.
