= Norbert Loch =

German luger (born 1962)

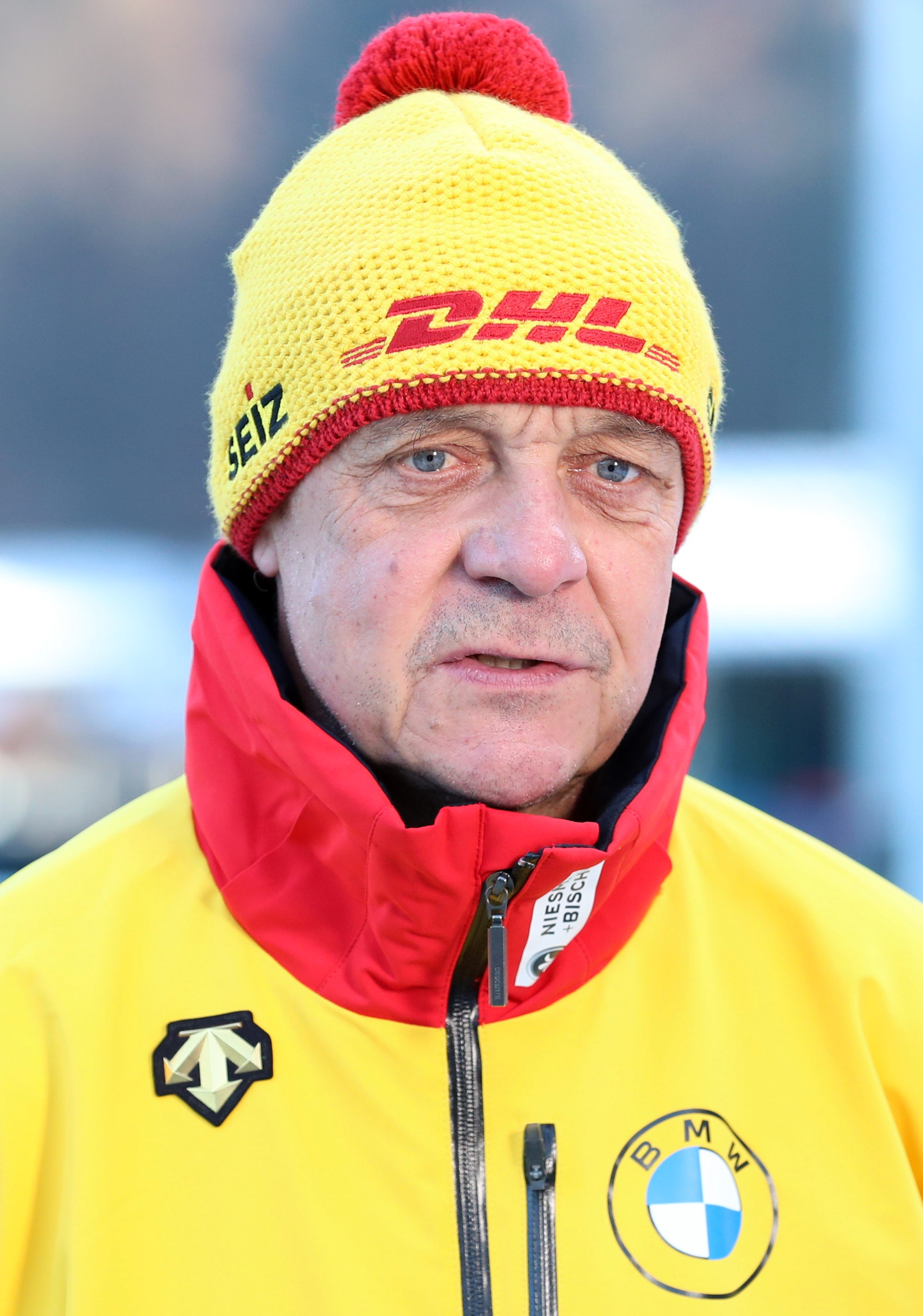
- Norbert Loch in 2020

Personal information
- Nationality: German
- Born: 11 March 1962 (age 63); Gotha, East Germany

Sport
- Sport: Luge

Norbert Loch (born 11 March 1962) is a German former luger. He competed in the men's singles event at the 1984 Winter Olympics.
