= Fredrik Wickman =

Swedish luger (born 1958)

Personal information
- Nationality: Swedish
- Born: 22 February 1958 (age 67); Stockholm, Sweden

Sport
- Sport: Luge

Fredrik Wickman (born 22 February 1958) is a Swedish luger. He competed in the men's singles event at the 1984 Winter Olympics.
