= Mike Howard (luger) =

British luger

Personal information
- Nationality: British
- Born: 18 May 1958 (age 66); London, England

Sport
- Sport: Luge

Mike Howard (born 18 May 1958) is a British luger. He competed in the men's singles event at the 1984 Winter Olympics.
