= British Virgin Islands at the 1984 Winter Olympics =

- Flag of the British Virgin Islands
- IOC code: IVB
- NOC: British Virgin Islands Olympic Committee
- Website: bviolympics.org

in Sarajevo
- Competitors: 1 (man) in 1 sport
- Flag bearer: Erroll Fraser
- Medals: Gold 0 Silver 0 Bronze 0 Total 0

Winter Olympics appearances (overview)
- 1984; 1988–2010; 2014; 2018–2022; 2026; 2030

The British Virgin Islands sent a delegation to compete in the 1984 Winter Olympics in Sarajevo, Yugoslavia from 8–19 February 1984. This was the first time the territory had participated in Olympic competition. The British Virgin Islands delegation consisted of a single speed skater, Erroll Fraser. His best performance in any event was 40th in the 500 metre race.

== Background ==
The British Virgin Islands Olympic Committee was recognized by the International Olympic Committee on 31 December 1981. The 1984 Sarajevo Games were the first Olympics, Summer or Winter, the British Virgin Islands ever competed in. While their participation at the Summer Olympics has been steady, it would take 30 years before the British Virgin Islands participated in another Winter Olympic Games, in 2014. The British Virgin Islands delegation to Sarajevo consisted of a single athlete, speed skater Erroll Fraser. He was the flag bearer for the opening ceremony.

== Speed skating ==
Erroll Fraser was 33 years old at the time of the Sarajevo Olympics, and is a native of the British Virgin Islands. On 10 February, he took part in the 500 metres race, setting a time of 43.47 seconds, which was a little over 5 seconds behind the gold medal time. He finished in 40th place, out of 42 competitors. In the 1,000 metres race, held on 14 February, he finished with a time of 1 minute and 30.59 seconds, which put him next to last in 42nd position.

Event	Athlete	Race	
Event	Athlete	Time	Rank
500 m	Erroll Fraser	43.47	40
1000 m	Erroll Fraser	1:30.59	42

== See also ==
- British Virgin Islands at the 1984 Summer Olympics
