= Chris Prentice =

British luger

Personal information
- Nationality: British
- Born: 4 May 1953 (age 71); London, England

Sport
- Sport: Luge

Chris Prentice (born 4 May 1953) is a British luger. He competed in the men's singles event at the 1984 Winter Olympics.
