= Suad Karajica =

Bosnian luger (1959–2020)

Personal information
- Nationality: Bosnian
- Born: 22 November 1959; Sarajevo, Yugoslavia
- Died: 13 April 2020 (aged 60)

Sport
- Country: Yugoslavia
- Sport: Luge

Suad Karajica (22 November 1959 – 13 April 2020) was a Bosnian luger. He competed for Yugoslavia in the men's singles event at the 1984 Winter Olympics.
