= Egypt at the 1984 Winter Olympics =

- IOC code: EGY
- NOC: Egyptian Olympic Committee
- Website: www.egyptianolympic.org (in Arabic and English)

in Sarajevo
- Competitors: 1 in 1 sport
- Flag bearer: Jamil El Reedy
- Medals: Gold 0 Silver 0 Bronze 0 Total 0

Winter Olympics appearances (overview)
- 1984; 1988–2026

Egypt competed in the Winter Olympic Games for the first, and as of 2026, only time at the 1984 Winter Olympics in Sarajevo, Yugoslavia. Its only participant was alpine skier Jamil El Reedy, who competed in three disciplines, but did not win a medal.

== Background ==
Prior to 1984, Egypt had sent athletes to eleven editions of the Summer Olympic Games (three times as the United Arab Republic), the 1906 Intercalated Games, and equestrian at the 1956 Summer Olympics. (Note: The 1912 Olympic report lists Egypt as having sent a fencer to those Games, but there is uncertainty as to whether he actually competed.) The 1984 Winter Games were Egypt's first, and as of 2026 only, appearance at the Winter Olympics. The nation entered one athlete, Jamil El-Reedy, to the alpine skiing tournament, where he competed in three disciplines, but failed to win a medal.

== Alpine skiing ==
El-Reedy was born in Cairo, to an Egyptian father and an American mother who taught English at the American University in Cairo. He moved to Plattsburgh, New York when his family left Egypt following the Six-Day War. Coached by his father, he became a successful skier in high school, training on Whiteface Mountain. He was selected to represent Egypt at the 1984 Games at the age of 18, despite never having competed internationally, and in preparation spent 40 days in an Egyptian cave filled with snakes and scorpions to strengthen his mental resolve. At the Games he competed in three events, with his best placement being 46th out of 101 entrants in the men's slalom. He was also 60th out of 61 participants in the men's downhill, finishing over a minute behind the penultimate finisher, Greece's Lazaros Arkhontopoulos, and failed to finish the men's giant slalom after a fall on the first run.

Men

Athlete	Event	Race 1		Race 2		Total	
Athlete	Event	Time	Rank	Time	Rank	Time	Rank
Jamil El-Reedy	Downhill					3:13.86	60
Jamil El-Reedy	Giant Slalom	DNF	–	–	–	DNF	–
Jamil El-Reedy	Slalom	1:30.56	65	1:26.37	46	2:56.93	46
