= Dragan Perović =

Yugoslavian alpine skier

Dragan Perović was a Yugoslavian alpine skier and sport official from Montenegro. He was best known for taking the Official's Oath at the 1984 Winter Olympics in Sarajevo.
