= Jamil El Reedy =

Egyptian alpine skier (born 1965)

Personal information
- Native name: جميل الريدى
- Full name: Jamil Omar Hatem Abdulalem Jamil El Reedy
- National team: Egypt
- Born: October 2, 1965 (age 61) Cairo, Egypt

Sport
- Sport: Alpine skiing

Jamil Omar Hatem Abdulalem Jamil El Reedy (Egyptian Arabic: جميل الريدى; born 2 October 1965 in Cairo) is a retired Egyptian alpine skier. El Reedy grew up in Plattsburgh, New York, USA. He was the first sportsperson to represent Egypt at the Winter Olympics.

== Early life ==
Jamil El Reedy's parents moved from Egypt to Plattsburgh, New York, USA following the Six-Day War. He learned to ski on Whiteface Mountain with his father coaching him. He gained local recognition as a star skier in his high school. Owing to his Egyptian heritage, he qualified to represent Egypt at the 1984 Winter Olympics. To prepare for the event, his father focused on training him mentally with arduous tasks, including sending him to a cave full of snakes and scorpions for 40 days.

== 1984 Winter Olympics ==
He was Egypt's sole representative at the 1984 Winter Olympics in Sarajevo. As such, he attracted lasting media attention, particularly when it was reported that he had "prepared by spending 40 days in a cave in the Egyptian desert". He finished 46th out of 101 in the slalom, 60th out of 61 in the downhill event, and did not finish the giant slalom, thus being eliminated. El Reedy did not participate in the subsequent 1988 Winter Olympics.

Due to him representing a non-alpine country and being seemingly unqualified for the Olympics, El Reedy has been described as a tourist athlete and has been compared to Eddie the Eagle.
