= Torsten Görlitzer =

German luger (born 1964)

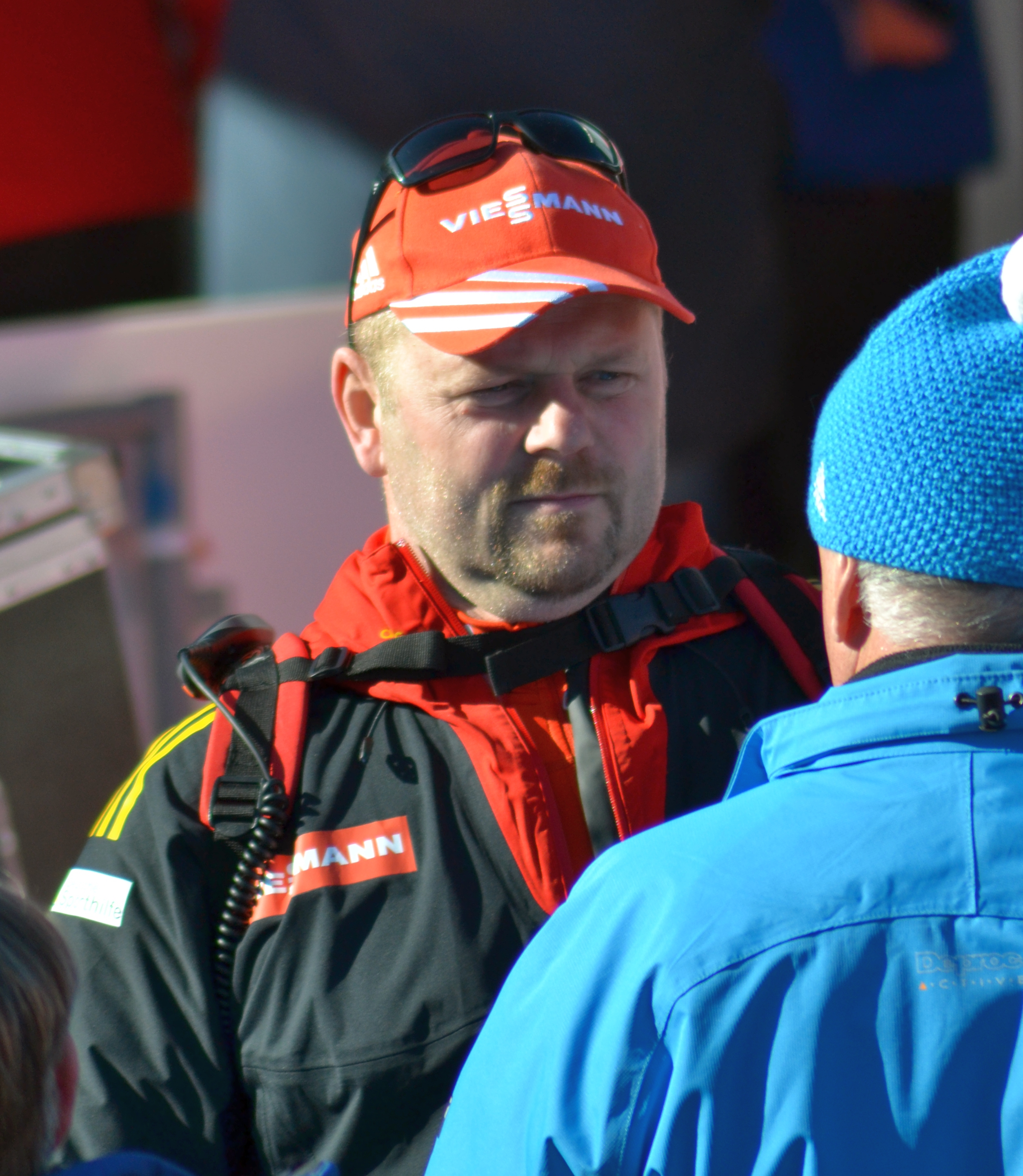
- Torsten Görlitzer in 2015

Personal information
- Nationality: German
- Born: 9 January 1964 (age 61); Marienberg, East Germany

Sport
- Sport: Luge

Torsten Görlitzer (born 9 January 1964) is a German luger. He competed in the men's singles event at the 1984 Winter Olympics.
