= 1984 Winter Olympics medal table =

1984 Winter Olympics medals
- Location: Sarajevo, Yugoslavia

Highlights
- Most gold medals: East Germany (9)
- Most total medals: Soviet Union (25)
- Medalling NOCs: 17

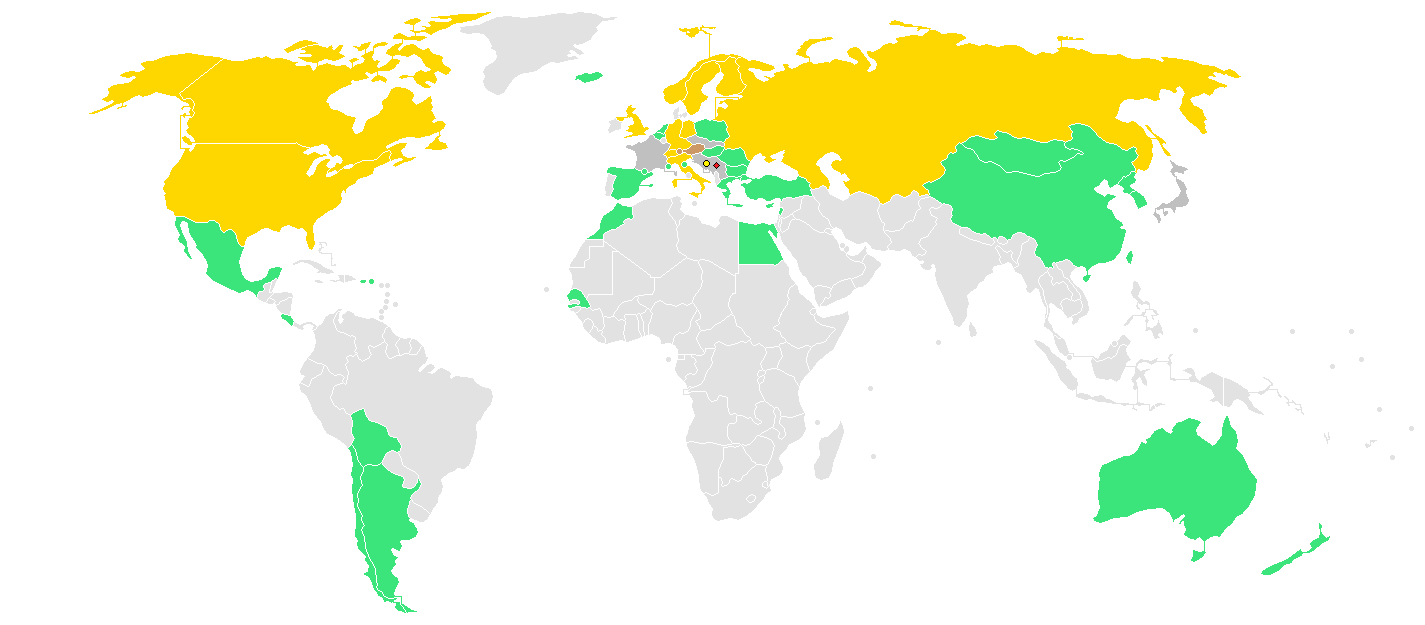
1984 Winter Olympic Games Medals map Legend: Gold represents countries that won at least one gold medal Silver represents countries that won at least one silver medal Bronze represents countries that won at least one bronze medal Green represents countries that did not win any medals Grey represents countries that did not participate

The 1984 Winter Olympics, officially known as the XIV Olympic Winter Games, was a winter multi-sport event held in Sarajevo, Yugoslavia, from 8 to 19 February 1984. A total of 1,272 athletes representing 49 National Olympic Committees (NOCs) participated in 39 events from 10 different sports and disciplines. First time NOCs to enter were Egypt, Monaco, Puerto Rico, Senegal, and British Virgin Islands.

Seventeen NOCs won at least one medal and, among these, eleven secured at least one gold medal. For the first time since its debut at the 1968 Winter Olympics, East Germany topped the gold medal count with nine, three more than the Soviet Union, which had led this count in the past three Games. The Soviet delegation won the most overall medals (25), including the most silvers (10) and bronzes (9). The host nation, Yugoslavia, collected its first-ever medal at the Winter Olympics: a silver by alpine skier Jure Franko in the men's giant slalom. This was the third time that the Winter Olympics host team failed to win a gold medal, after France in 1924 and Switzerland in 1928.

Austrian athletes secured a single medal—a bronze in men's alpine skiing downhill—in what is the nation's worst ever result at the Winter Games. In contrast, Czechoslovakia and Finland's performances in Sarajevo were historical bests, after collecting a total of six and thirteen medals, respectively. Finnish cross-country skier Marja-Liisa Hämäläinen was responsible for three of her NOC's four gold medals with a sweep of victories in the women's individual events, and contributed to the bronze in the team relay event. These Games also witnessed the best result by a Canadian team since the 1960 Winter Olympics, thanks mostly to the achievements of speed skater Gaétan Boucher. His wins in the men's 1,000 and 1,500 metres, and a third place in the 500 metres, earned Canada's two gold medals and three of its four medals. Sweden secured four golds for the first time since St. Moritz 1948, of which three were obtained by cross-country skiers Gunde Svan and Thomas Wassberg. Svan and Wassberg won the men's 15 km and 50 km, respectively, and also clinched the first place in the team relay. Svan was also awarded with a silver and bronze medals, thus contributing half of his NOC's medal tally. For the third consecutive Winter Olympics, Great Britain's sole medal was a gold at a figure skating event, this time in ice dancing by Jayne Torvill and Christopher Dean, who received the first-ever set of perfect scores in their free program routine.

== Medal table ==
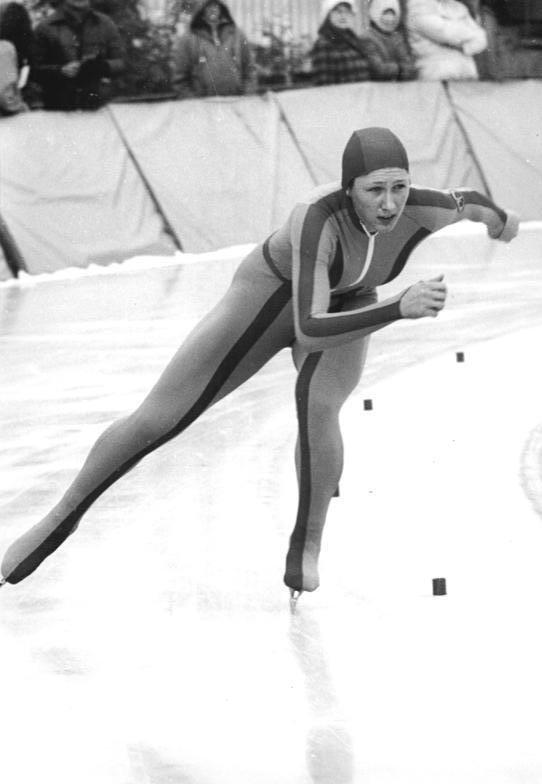
Karin Kania-Enke won either gold or silver in each of the four women's speed skating events, to become the most medaled East German athlete at these Games.

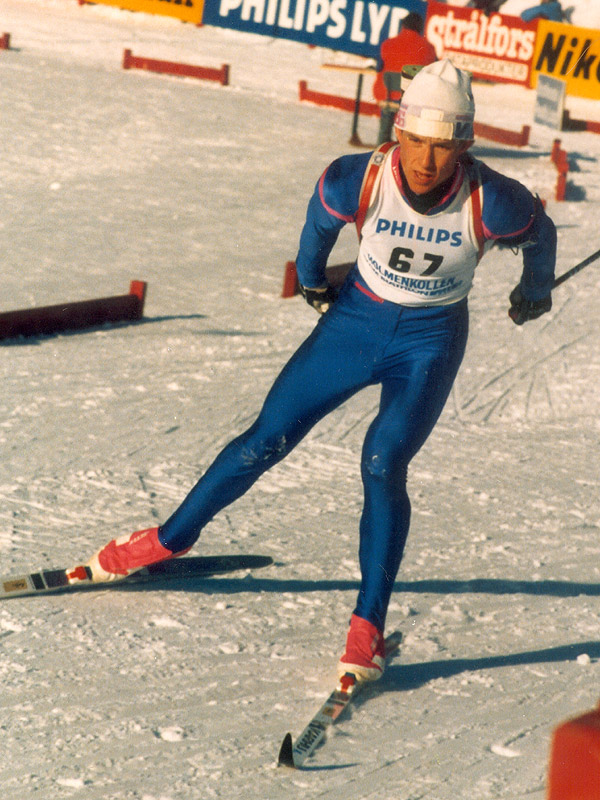
Eirik Kvalfoss won three medals in biathlon (gold, silver, and bronze), a third of Norway's medals in Sarajevo.

The medal table is based on information provided by the International Olympic Committee (IOC) and is consistent with IOC convention in its published medal tables. The table uses the Olympic medal table sorting method. By default, the table is ordered by the number of gold medals the athletes from a nation have won, where a nation is an entity represented by a National Olympic Committee (NOC). The number of silver medals is taken into consideration next, and then the number of bronze medals. If teams are still tied, equal ranking is given and they are listed alphabetically by their IOC country code.

* Host nation (Yugoslavia)

Rank	Nation	Gold	Silver	Bronze	Total
1	East Germany	9	9	6	24
2	Soviet Union	6	10	9	25
3	United States	4	4	0	8
4	Finland	4	3	6	13
5	Sweden	4	2	2	8
6	Norway	3	2	4	9
7	Switzerland	2	2	1	5
8	Canada	2	1	1	4
8	West Germany	2	1	1	4
10	Italy	2	0	0	2
11	Great Britain	1	0	0	1
12	Czechoslovakia	0	2	4	6
13	France	0	1	2	3
14	Japan	0	1	0	1
14	Yugoslavia*	0	1	0	1
16	Liechtenstein	0	0	2	2
17	Austria	0	0	1	1
Totals (17 entries)		39	39	39	117

== Medal distribution ==
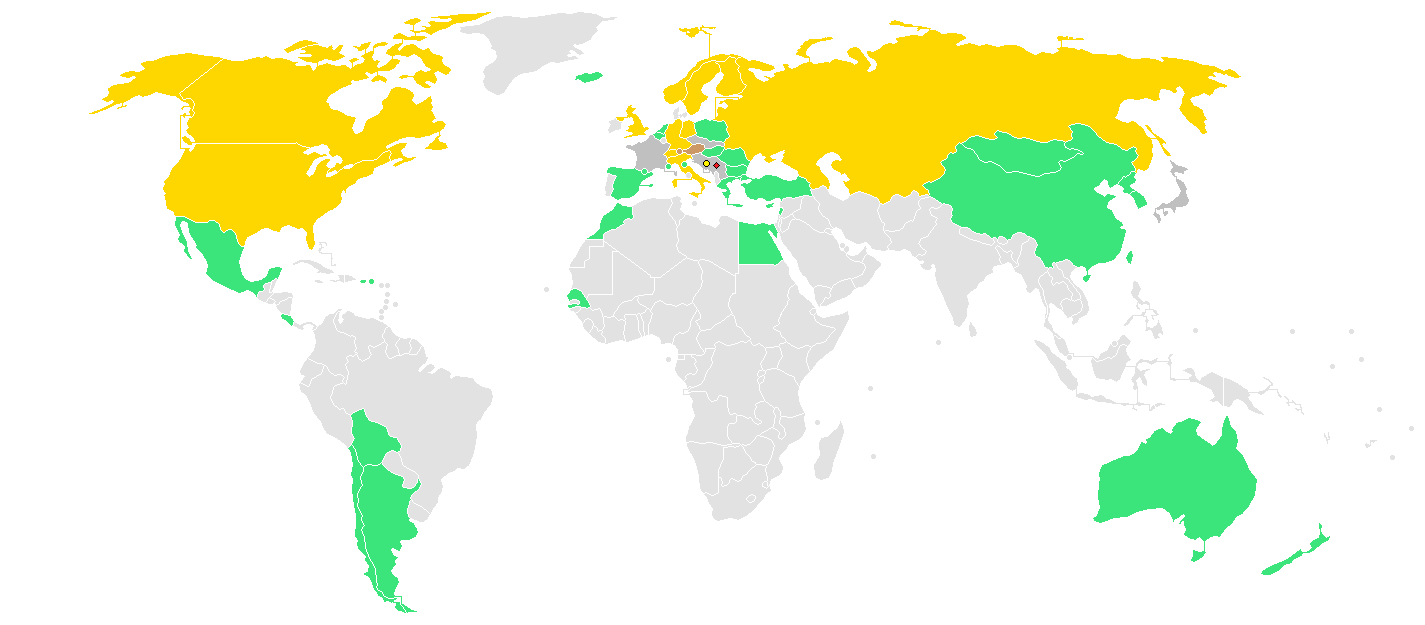
Participating NOCs with: at least one gold medal; at least one silver medal; at least one bronze medal; no medals. Red diamond: first medal. Yellow circle: host country.
1. Andorra
2. Argentina
3. Australia
4. Austria
5. Belgium
6. Bolivia
7. Bulgaria
8. Canada
9. Chile
10. China
11. Costa Rica
12. Cyprus
13. Czechoslovakia
14. Egypt
15. Finland
16. France
17. East Germany
18. West Germany
19. Great Britain
20. Greece
21. Hungary
22. Iceland
23. Italy
24. Japan
25. North Korea
26. South Korea
27. Lebanon
28. Liechtenstein
29. Mexico
30. Monaco
31. Mongolia
32. Morocco
33. Netherlands
34. New Zealand
35. Norway
36. Poland
37. Puerto Rico
38. Romania
39. San Marino
40. Senegal
41. Soviet Union
42. Spain
43. Sweden
44. Switzerland
45. Chinese Taipei
46. Turkey
47. United States
48. Virgin Islands
49. Yugoslavia

== See also ==
- 1984 Winter Paralympics medal table
- 1984 Summer Olympics medal table
