= Valery Dudin =

Soviet luger (born 1963)

Olympic medal record

Luge
Bronze medal – third place	1984 Sarajevo	Men's singles

Valery Dudin (born 20 August 1963) is a Soviet luger who competed during the 1980s. He earned the bronze medal in the men's singles event at the 1984 Winter Olympics in Sarajevo. He also competed at the 1988 Winter Olympics.
