= Sarajevo Olympic Bobsleigh and Luge Track =

Sports track for the 1984 Olympics

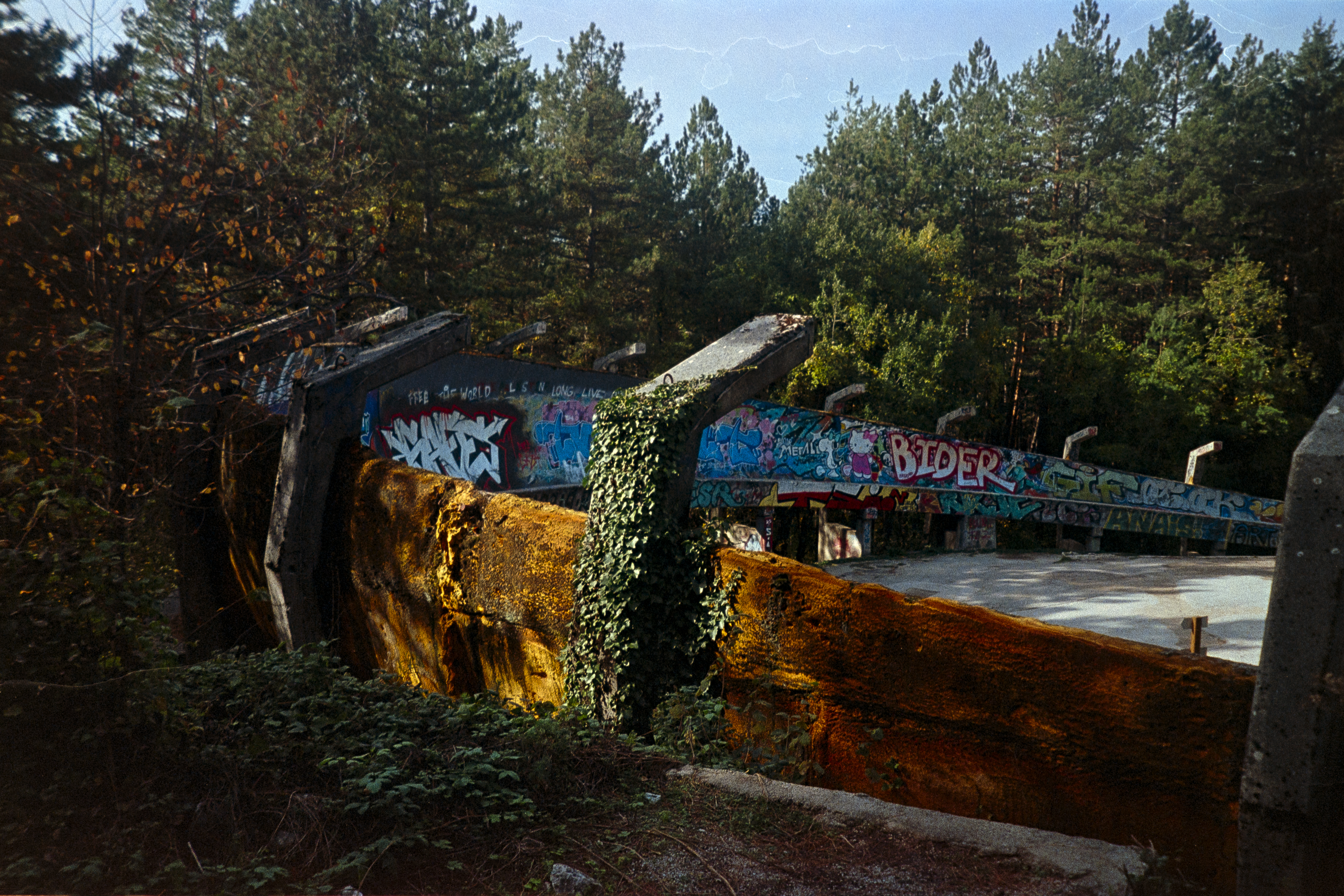
- Sarajevo Olympic Bobsleigh with overgrowth and graffiti, October 2024
- Interactive map of Sarajevo Olympic Bobsleigh and Luge Track
- Full name: Olimpijska staza za bob i sankanje Trebević; Олимпијска стаза за боб и санкање Требевић
- Location: Sarajevo, Bosnia and Herzegovina
- Coordinates: 43°50′28″N 18°26′32″E
- Surface: Artificial, refrigerated concrete

Construction
- Groundbreaking: 1981
- Opened: 1982; 44 years ago
- Closed: 1992; 34 years ago
- Cost: $8,500,000 USD (563,209,000 YUD)
- Architect: Gorazd Bučar

Sarajevo Olympic Bobsleigh and Luge Track is a derelict bobsleigh and luge track situated on Trebević mountain overlooking the City of Sarajevo, built for the 1984 Winter Olympics.

== History ==
When Sarajevo was awarded the 1984 Winter Olympics in 1977, a bobsleigh and luge track was proposed. The track design was approved in 1981, with construction starting on 1 June of that year. Assembly of the track was completed on 30 September 1982 at a cost of YUD 563,209,000. The first international competition of merit held at the track was the 1983 European Bobsleigh Championships in January of that year. At the 1984 Games, there were 20,000 luge spectators and 30,000 bobsleigh spectators. After the Winter Olympics, the track was used for World Cup competitions until the Yugoslav wars started in 1991, which included the Bosnian War the following year. The track was damaged as a result of the Siege of Sarajevo; during the siege, the track was used as an artillery position by Bosnian Serb forces. The track still remains mostly intact (as of June 2023), with the war wounds of defensive fighting holes drilled into one of the last turns of the course. The track has been used for graffiti and bicycling in the period between the end of the war and the commencement of renovations in 2014. In June 2014, restoration began on the track, including the removal of overgrowth and graffiti, and the application of a protective coating from Start 1 down to the bottom of the course.

== Design ==
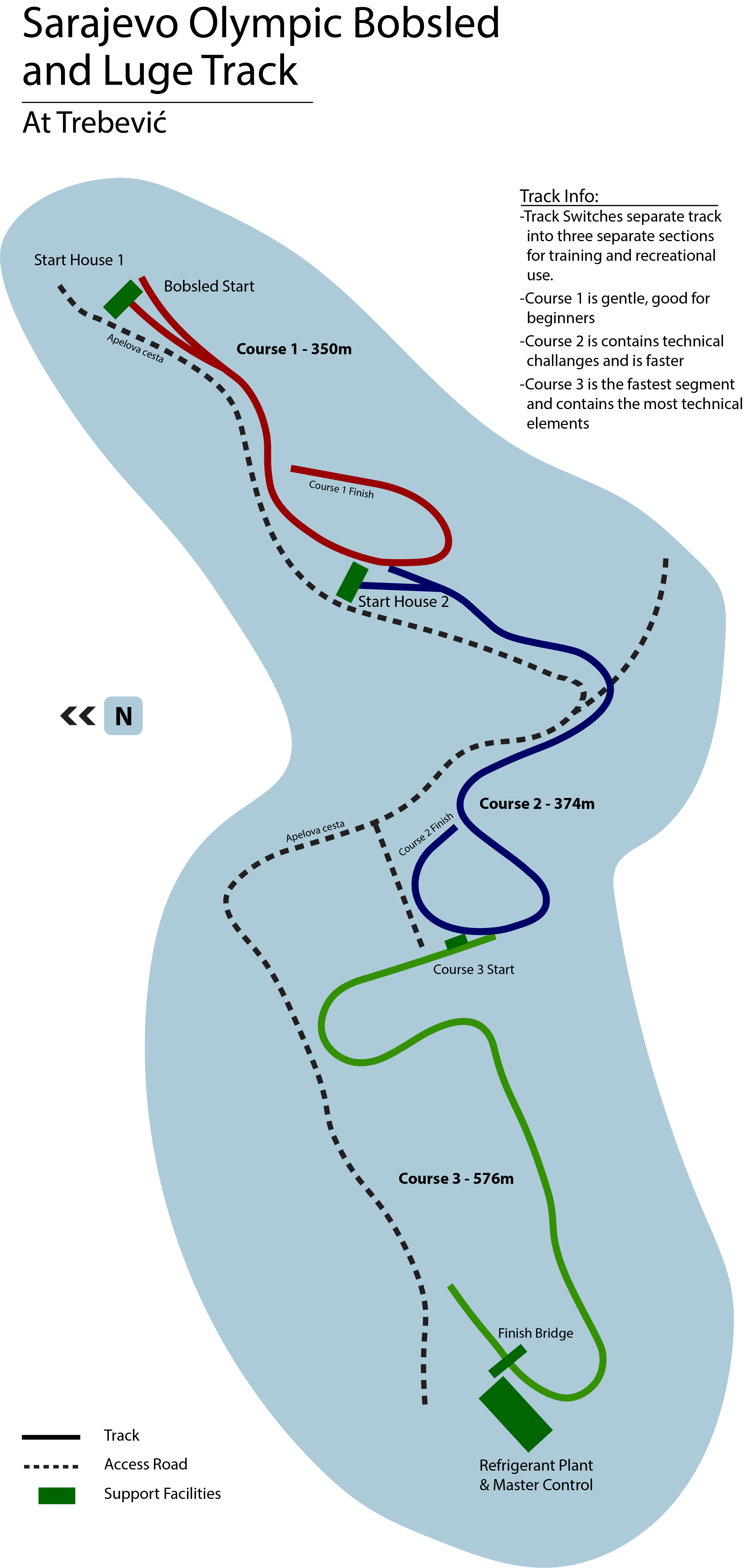
The Sarajevo Olympic Bobsleigh and Luge Track, separated into its training and recreation sections

The German Democratic Republic's four-man bobsled number 2 sled races through the final curve 13 during the 1983 European Bobsleigh Championships at the Mt. Trebevic Bobsleigh and Luge Track.

In preparation for the 1984 Winter Olympic Games, Mt. Trebević was selected as the site for a new sliding complex. The track complex was designed by architect Gorazd Bučar, with a vision for both a reduced footprint of the facility, and flexible and adaptable use as a piece of Olympic Legacy Infrastructure. The track can be split into three segments for recreational and training purposes.

When the track saw its first real competition (and a test competition ahead of the 1984 Olympic Winter Games), 1,246 heats of two- and four-man bobs were completed with just four overturns and only one serious injury reported. FIL (International Luge Federation) and FIBT (International Federation of Bobsleigh and Tobogganing) experts heralded the track as "Safe, Quick, and technically interesting and requires extreme concentration and technical knowledge."

The top section, known as 'Course 1', begins at the upper start house and runs 350 meters (1,150 ft), splitting from the main track at turn 3. With the slightest grade, it is suitable for all riders.

The center section, known as 'Course 2', begins at the second start house and runs 374 meters (1,227 ft) splitting from the main track at turn 7, after the complex and high-G 'Double S' turns (5, 6, and 7). It is more intense and complex, and provides a good training and recreational experience of complex turning.

The bottom section, known as 'Course 3', begins below turn 7, and at 576 meters (1,890 ft) is the longest and fastest segment of the track containing some of the most complex turns in sliding: Omega, the Hairpin and the Labyrinth. Course 3 ends at the bottom of the track.

== Renovation ==
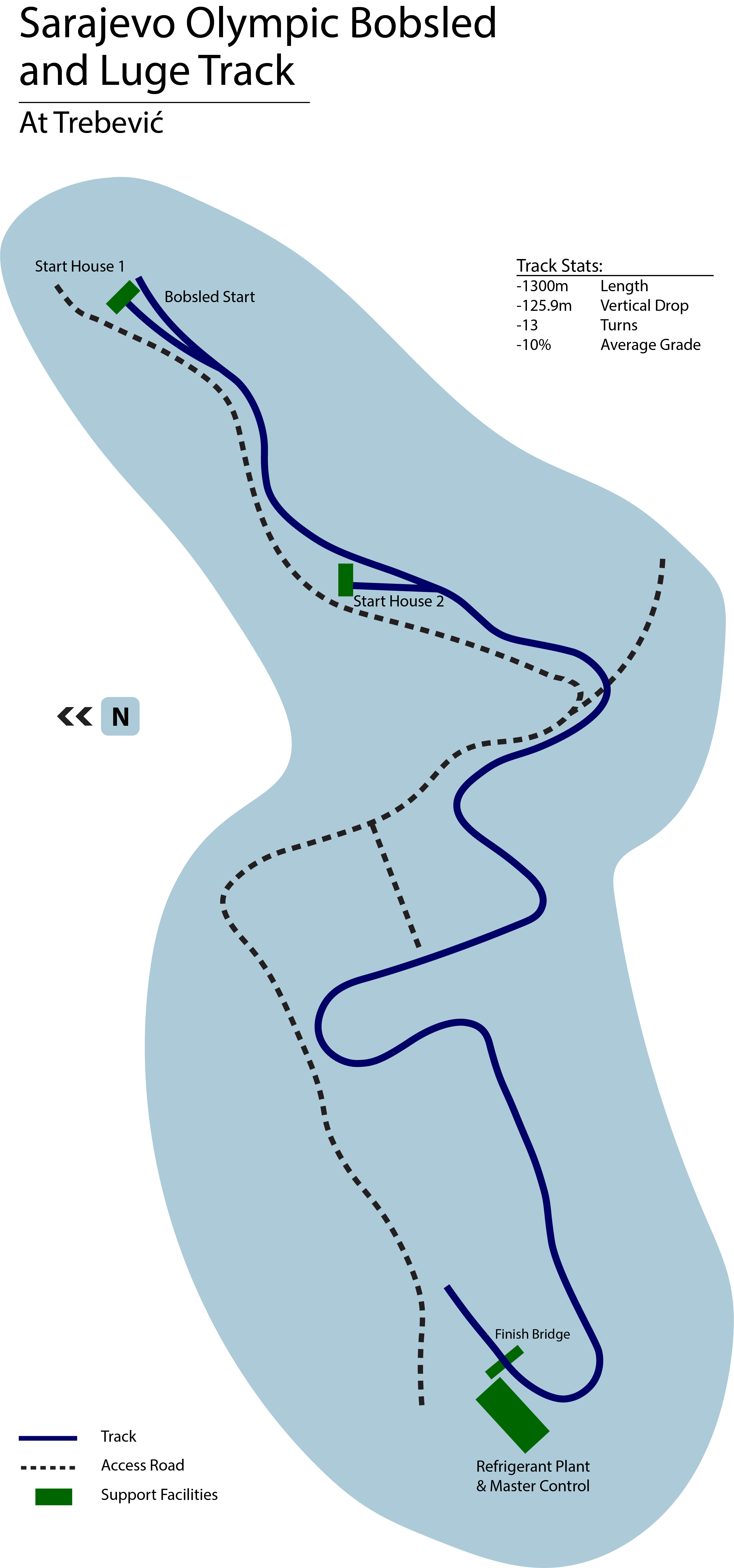
A diagram of the Sarajevo Olympic Bobsleigh and Luge Track

Beginning in 2014, following an extensive demining operation, limited renovations began-preparing the site for summer training with a grant from the International Luge Federation. As of January 2018 that operation continues. It is unclear when winter events will begin again due to the complete loss of both start houses and the refrigeration plant along with the extensive damage to every refrigerant and track-switching system on the track. The only remaining piece of the venue is the track itself, and is structurally in serviceable condition. However, the ultimate goal is to return the track to fully serviceable condition for hosting future sliding competitions and training teams from around the world.

After the track's initial repairs, sliding sport competitors from Bosnia and Herzegovina, Slovakia, Poland, Turkey, Slovenia, Croatia and Serbia began regularly using the track for summer training. The damaged facility quickly became a regional training center and began receiving praise from its new users as one of the best of the nine such facilities available for training worldwide, and for bringing sliding sports back to the Balkans.

In the initial bid for the 2019 European Youth Olympic Winter Festival the track was considered for reconstruction to allow competition at the venue, however, due to the massive cost of rebuilding much of the track's critical infrastructure, sliding events were not run.

In April 2022, the Government of the Sarajevo Canton appointed a team to develop a plan for the revitalization and reconstruction of the entire facility as part of Barcelona's potential bid for the 2030 Winter Olympics. As the Barcelona bid did not materialise, the reconstruction was postponed.

In 2025, the Olympic Story educational trail was installed along the track. It features 13 panels with QR codes that tell the story of the Sarajevo Olympics.

== Track lengths and turns ==
Physical statistics:
Sport	Length	Turns	Vertical drop (start to finish)	Average grade (%)
Bobsleigh	1,300 m (4,300 ft)	13	125.90 m (413.1 ft)	10.2
Luge – men's singles	1,210 m (3,970 ft)	13	129.35 m (424.4 ft)	10.2
Luge – women's singles / men's doubles	993 m (3,258 ft)	11	99.80 m (327.4 ft)	10.2

Turns:
Turn number	Turn name	Track gradient
1		12%
2		14%
3		15%
4		15%
5	The Double 'S'	~14%
6	The Double 'S'	~18%
7	The Double 'S'	~19%
8	Omega	~7%
9		~8%
10	The Labyrinth	~16%
11	The Labyrinth	~16%
12	The Labyrinth	~16%
13	Finish Corner	~16%

== Major events hosted ==
During its short ten-year operational history, the track hosted a number of high-profile sliding events.

Year	Event
1983	Bobsleigh European Championships
1984	XIV Olympic Winter Games
1985	Skeleton European Championship
1987	Skeleton European Championship
1988	Bobsleigh European Championship

== In popular culture ==
The bobsleigh and luge track is the subject of the 2025 documentary film The Track.

== See also ==
- Bjelašnica – Alpine skiing (men)
- Igman, Malo Polje – Nordic combined, Ski jumping
- Igman, Veliko Polje – Biathlon, Cross-country skiing, Nordic combined
- Jahorina – Alpine skiing (women)
- Koševo Stadium – Opening ceremonies
- Skenderija II Hall – Figure skating, Ice hockey
- Zetra Ice Hall – Closing ceremonies, Figure skating, Ice hockey
- Zetra Ice Rink – Speed skating
