= Erroll Fraser =

British Virgin Islands speed skater

Erroll Canute Fraser (30 July 1950 – 24 December 2002) was an ice speed skater from the British Virgin Islands, who represented his native country at the 1984 Winter Olympics in Sarajevo, Yugoslavia at the age of 33. There he finished in 40th (500 m) and 42nd place (1.000 m), in the nation's first-ever appearance at the Winter Olympics.

Fraser is believed to be the only black speed skater in the twentieth century to compete at the Winter Games. The first black speed skater to win an Olympic medal was Shani Davis in 2006.

Olympic Games
Preceded by First	Flagbearer for British Virgin Islands; Sarajevo 1984	Succeeded by Lindel Hodge
