= 1984 Winter Olympics =

Multi-sport event in Sarajevo, Yugoslavia

XIV Olympic Winter Games
- Logo of the 1984 Winter Olympics (Note: The emblem symbolizes a stylized snowflake, as well as the embroidery produced in the Sarajevo region with the Olympic rings above.)
- Location: Sarajevo, Yugoslavia (Note: Located in what is now Bosnia and Herzegovina.)
- Nations: 49
- Athletes: 1,273 (999 men, 274 women)
- Events: 39 in 6 sports (10 disciplines)
- Opening: 8 February 1984
- Closing: 19 February 1984
- Opened by: President of the Presidency Mika Špiljak
- Closed by: IOC President Juan Antonio Samaranch
- Cauldron: Sanda Dubravčić
- Stadium: Koševo Stadium (opening ceremony); Zetra Ice Hall (closing ceremony)

The 1984 Winter Olympics, officially known as the XIV Olympic Winter Games, (Note: Serbo-Croatian: XIV. Zimske olimpijske igre, XIV Зимске олимпијске игре; Slovene: XIV Zimske olimpijske igre; Macedonian: XIV Зимски олимписки игри, romanized: XIV Zimski olimpiski igri) and commonly known as Sarajevo '84, (Note: Serbian Cyrillic: Сарајево '84; Macedonian: Сараево '84) were a winter multi-sport event held between 8 and 19 February 1984 in Sarajevo, Bosnia and Herzegovina, Yugoslavia. It was the first Winter Olympic Games held in a Slavic language-speaking country, as well as the only Winter Olympics held in a communist country before the 2022 Winter Olympics in Beijing, China. It was the second consecutive Olympic Games held in such a country after the 1980 Summer Olympics in Moscow, Soviet Union.

The Games were held in Sarajevo and at neighbouring resorts in the Dinaric Alps located less than 25 kilometres from the city. At the first days of the Games, the sports program was disrupted by extreme weather conditions and the alpine ski events started four days later than planned.

The Games brought together 1272 athletes from 49 countries, which represents a significant increase compared to 1980. Athletes participated in six sports and ten disciplines for a total of thirty-nine official events, one more than four years earlier. Five National Olympic Committees sent their athletes to the Olympic Winter Games for the first time, including Egypt, British Virgin Islands, Monaco, Puerto Rico and Senegal. Finland's Marja-Liisa Hämäläinen, who won all three individual races in cross-country skiing, earned the most individual medals of the Games. The host country Yugoslavia won its first-ever medal at the Winter Games after alpine skier Jure Franko came second in the giant slalom. East Germany, which won all gold and silver medals in women's speed skating and bobsleigh, topped the medal table for the first time with twenty-four medals overall, nine of which were gold.

The 1984 Winter Olympics, considered a success, made it possible to further modernize Sarajevo and develop winter sports in Yugoslavia, but the war in Yugoslavia, which broke out in 1992, heavily damaged the city and the Olympic facilities. Some sites have been renovated after the war but others remain abandoned, the former bobsleigh/luge track being one of the more well-known abandoned sites.

== Host city selection ==
=== Selection of the host city ===
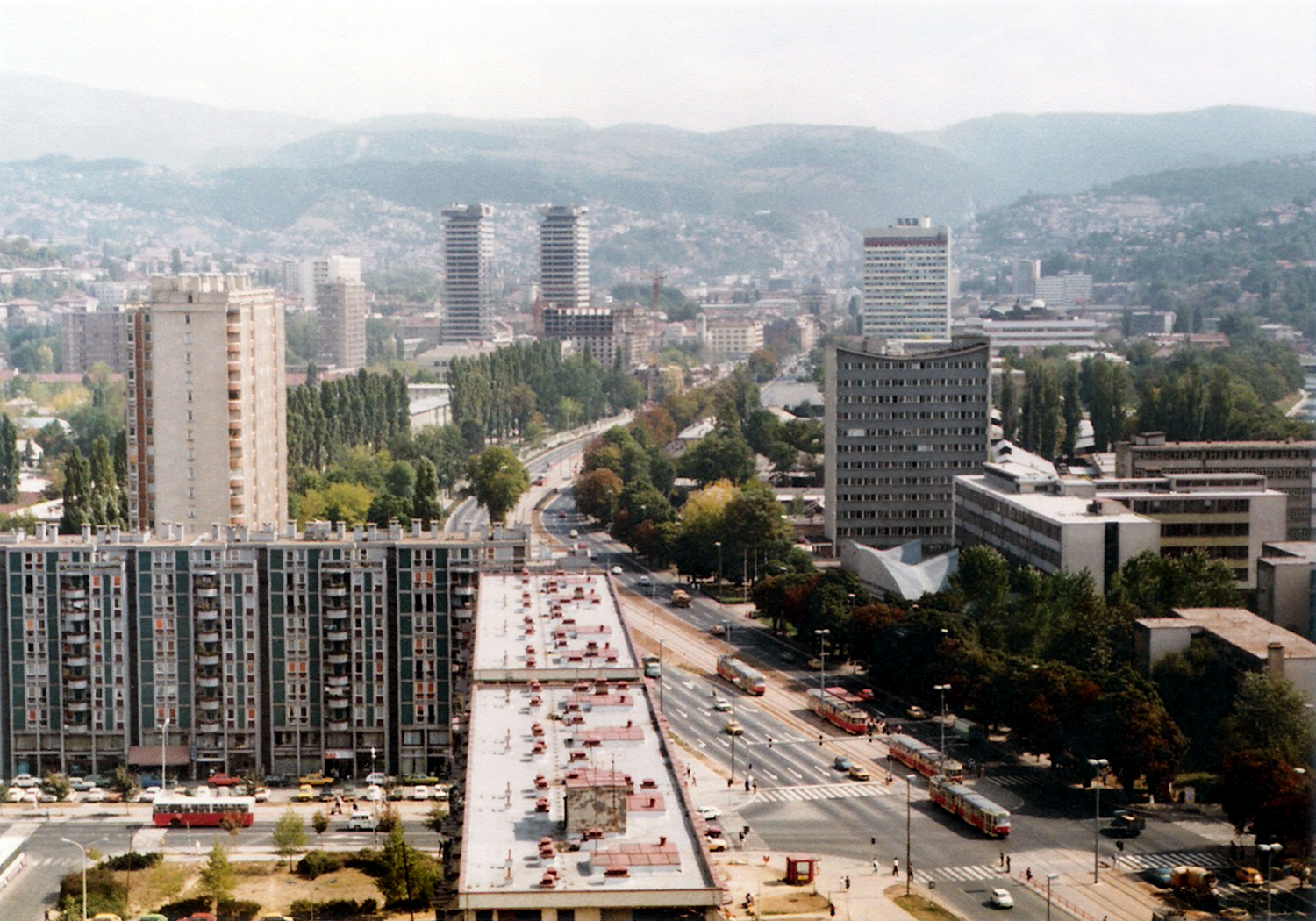
Sarajevo in 1982

A study entitled "The possibilities and problems of tourism development continental in Yugoslavia" and published in 1968 by the Organisation for Economic Co-operation and Development (OECD) first indicated that Yugoslavia and in particular the region of Sarajevo have favorable conditions for the development of winter sports. As early as 1970, the authorities in Sarajevo planned to host the Winter Olympics to promote this development and become a sustainable winter sports center. They first considered a candidature for the Games of 1976 or 1980 but, after having modernized the city within the framework of the project "Protection of the environment and of man", applied for those of 1984. The bid committee was created on 23 November 1977.

Two other bidding cities for the Games were Gothenburg in Sweden and Sapporo in Japan. If the IOC were to choose Gothenburg, the logistical costs would be very high because the competition places would be decentralized. Sapporo had previously hosted the Games in 1972, only twelve years before the proposed dates and Nagoya was also in a campaign for the 1988 Summer Olympics. The city therefore had experience and most of the infrastructure present and was in use since then, but after Lake Placid a European host city was seen as better option. Sarajevo presented a compact project, with all the planned venues within 25 kilometers of the city, and had experience of several international competitions such as Alpine Skiing World Cup events, and the European Figure Skating Championship.

1984 Winter Olympics bidding results
| City | Country | Round | |
| City | Country | 1 | 2 |
|---|---|---|---|
| Sarajevo | Yugoslavia | 31 | 39 |
| Sapporo | Japan | 33 | 36 |
| Gothenburg | Sweden | 10 | — |

The host city for the XIV Olympic Winter Games was announced on 18 May 1978, during the 80th session of the International Olympic Committee (IOC) in Athens, Greece. Sarajevo was selected by a margin of three votes over Sapporo, Japan. Gothenburg became the first Swedish city to lose a Winter Olympics bid; other Swedish cities, such as Falun and Östersund, would later lose consecutive bids to the Calgary (1988), Albertville (1992), Lillehammer (1994), Nagano (1998), Salt Lake City (2002), and Milan-Cortina d'Ampezzo (2026), respectively. Sarajevo, the capital of present-day Bosnia and Herzegovina, was the third-largest city of Yugoslavia at the time.

=== Politics ===
The 1984 Winter Games took place during the Cold War, four years after the boycott of the Moscow Games by 66 National Olympic Committees including the United States and a few months before the boycott of the Los Angeles 1984 Games by the Soviet Union and another 17 National Olympics Committees. International tensions did not affect the Winter Games.

== Organization ==
=== Organizing ===
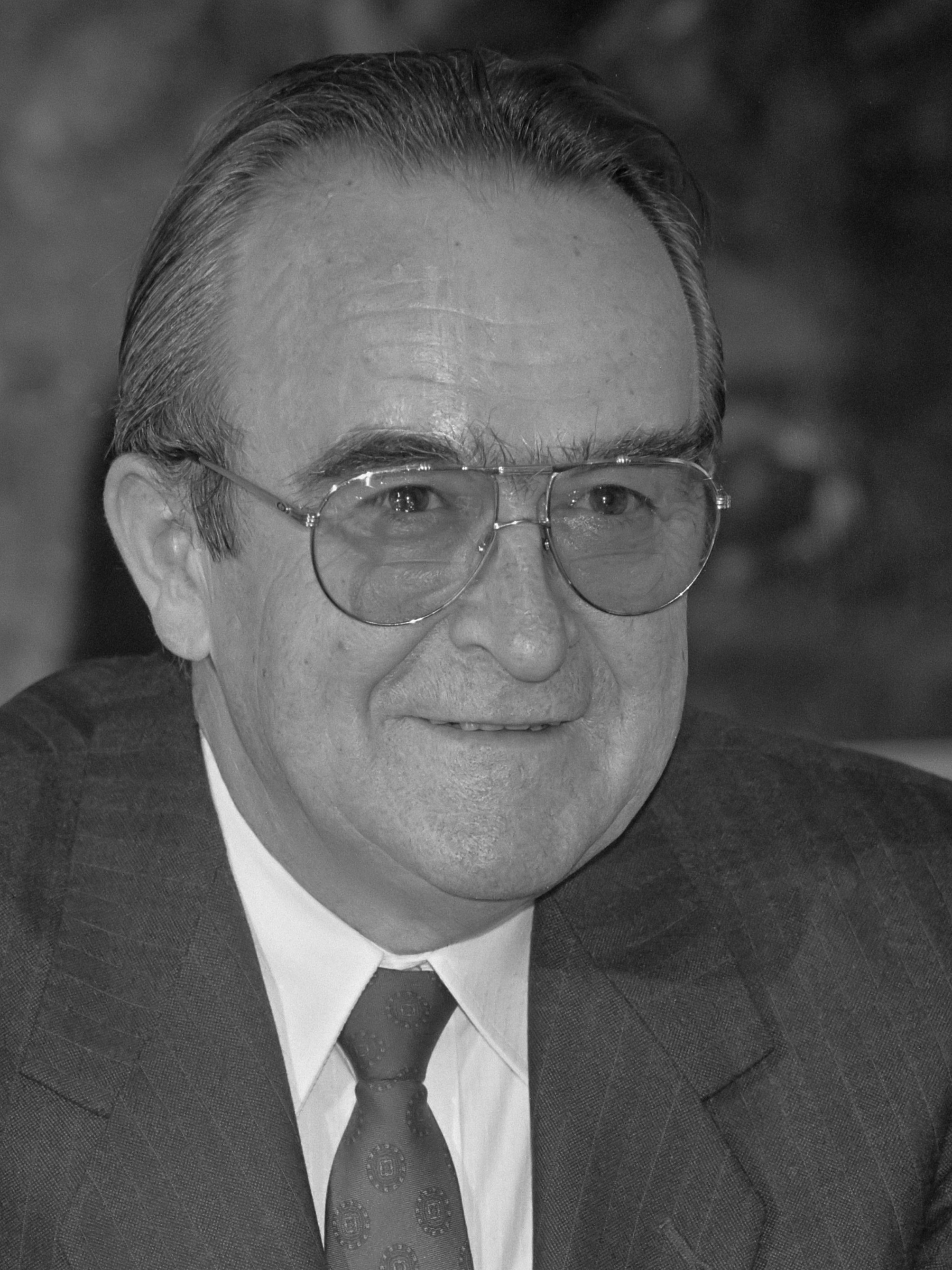
Chair of the Organizing Committee Branko Mikulić

The organizing committee was created on July 13, 1978, and their final form with 79 members was formed as April 1980 by the Yugoslav Olympic Committee and the Sarajevo Municipal Assembly. Branko Mikulić, member of the presidency of the central committee of the League of Communists of Yugoslavia, was appointed chairman of the organizing committee. Ahmed Karabegović was appointed the secretary-general and Anto Sučić, then president of the Sarajevo Municipal Assembly, became the president of the executive committee. The organizing committee included the president of the Yugoslav Olympic committee and representatives of the Federal Executive Council, the League of Communists and the Socialist Alliance of the Working People.

=== Financial aspects ===
According to the financial results of the Games, the revenues amounted to YUD 19.83 billion (approximately US$203 million) and expenses at YUD 17.3 billion (US$177 million), a net amount of YUD 2.54 billion (US$26 million). The official report for the games listed the final profit at US$10 million.

This was the first time in history that the Winter Olympic Games were organized in a socialist state, but the organizers did not hesitate to partner with private companies to finance the Games. The Organizing Committee argued it was not hypocritical because sport must be above political influence. The organizing committee signed 218 contracts and arrangements in Yugoslavia and 459 on the foreign market. This included the sale of television rights, sponsorship, sale of license rights, free delivery of goods and equipment, advertising, donations as well as Olympic coins, lottery and philately. Marketing brought in YUD 4.31 billion on the national market and YUD 9.42 billion on the foreign market, totaling YUD 13.73 billion (US$141.65 million). The government also contributed to the financing of the Games: the Socialist Republic of Bosnia and Herzegovina paid YUD 1.83 billion, the national government of Yugoslavia and the other republics and autonomous regions, YUD 780 million and the city of Sarajevo, YUD 1 billion. From 1982 to the end of 1984, a deduction made from citizens' salaries (0.2% for citizens of Bosnia and Herzegovina, 0.3% for those of Sarajevo) brought in YUD 1.21 billion.

Building the facilities and purchasing the equipment for the Games cost a total of YUD 8.63 billion. The expenses were listed at 2.26 billion for equipment, 970 million for the Zetra hall, 600 million for the alpine ski slopes, 500 million for the ice rink and the Main Press Center, 560 million for the bobsleigh and luge track, 400 million for the speed skating track and 340 million for the ski jumps. The organizing committee also invested YUD 1.65 billion in posts, telegraphs and telephones, the television network, the expansion and modernization of the Sarajevo Airport, the road network, 23 sports centers and other facilities. Preparation and organization costs were listed at YUD 4.51 billion.

=== Transport ===
The region's transport network was developed for the Games. Roads with a total length of 160 kilometers were constructed to improve access to mountain sites from Sarajevo or to link the sites to each other. The city's train station and the Sarajevo International Airport were renovated, and an international terminal was built.

Most of the athletes, accompanying persons, officials and visitors arrived in Yugoslavia by regular international flights to Zagreb and Belgrade and reached Sarajevo by trains, buses or charter flights that landed directly on the city. Spectators were transported to the venues by coaches, rental or personal cars, and minibuses. These options were also used for official transport.

=== Visual identity ===
The emblem of the 1984 Winter Olympics was a stylized snowflake which also used the national embroidery motif overhung with the Olympic rings by Miroslav Antonić Roko. The mascot for the competition was chosen by readers of Yugoslav newspapers from among six entries. The mascot was a wolf named Vučko and created by Slovenian Jože Trobec.

== Media ==
More than 3,000 employees of the Yugoslav public broadcaster, Yugoslav Radio Television, produced 204 hours of television broadcasts. The number of countries in which received broadcasts of the games on television increased from 40 to 100 and the broadcasting rights, which were US$20.7 million in 1980, stood at US$102.7 million. Media revenue is shared between the organizing committee which received two-thirds and the IOC which collected one-third. The channel ABC spent US$91.5 million to broadcast the footage in the United States, nearly 51% of all money spent on broadcasting rights.

The Games were covered by 7,393 representatives of the media from 39 countries: 2,363 journalists from the print media and 5,030 employees of television and radio channels. Seven Media Press Centers and International Broadcaster Centers were set at the various competition venues, the main one was inside the Skenderija Center.

== Torch relay ==
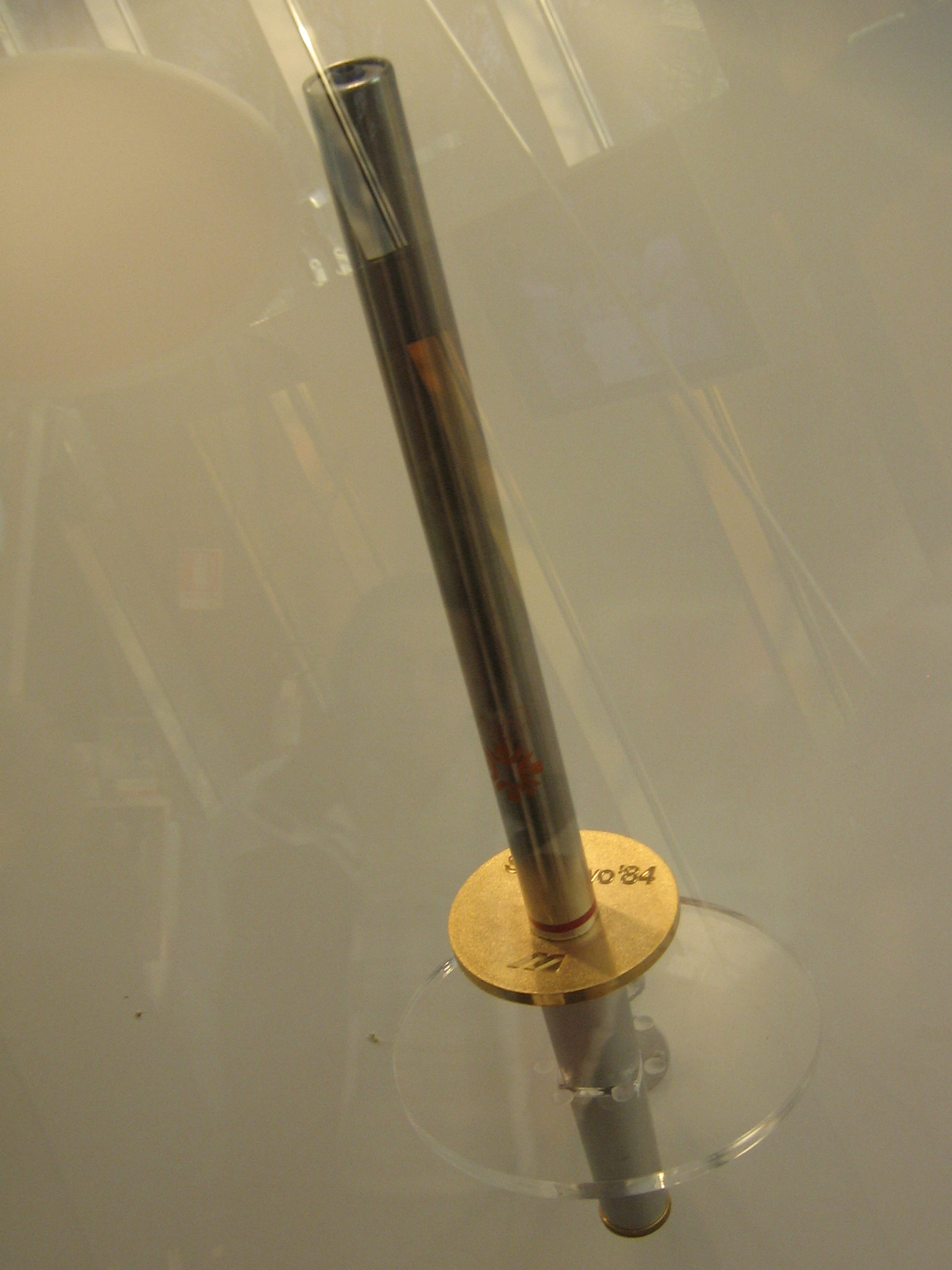
Olympic torch, Sarajevo 1984

The torch relay for the 1984 Winter Olympics started in Olympia After being lit in Olympia, the flame was taken by car and plane to Athens via Andravida Air Base, where it took off for Dubrovnik by airplane. The total distance of the torch relay through Yugoslavia was 5,289 kilometres (3,286 mi) plus 2,879 kilometres (1,789 mi) of local routes. There were two main routes: one in the west (Split – Ljubljana – Zagreb – Sarajevo), 2,602 kilometres (1,617 mi) in length; and the other in the east (Skopje – Novi Sad – Belgrade – Sarajevo), 2,687 kilometres (1,670 mi) in length. The final torchbearer, from a total of 1,600, was figure skater Sanda Dubravčić, who received the torch from cross country skier Ivo Čarman. One of the two original torches is held in a private collection in Žalec, Slovenia. There are also 20 more torches in Greece, owned by individual athletes who were the torchbearers from Ancient Olympia to Andravida Air Base, where it took off for Dubrovnik.

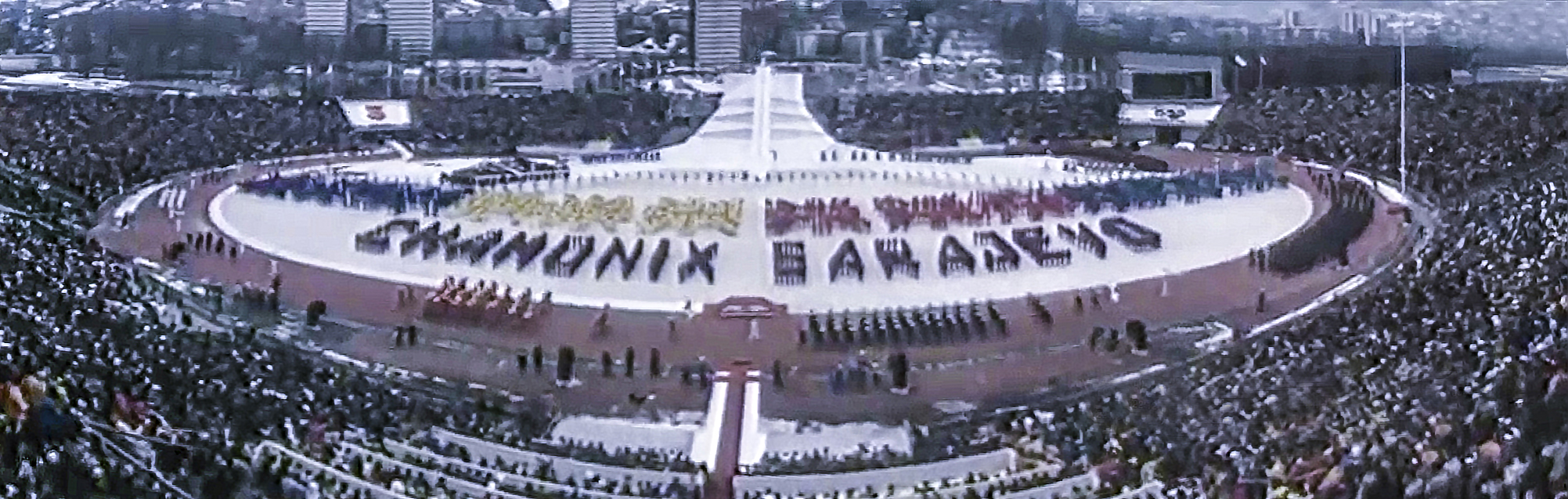
Panoramic view of Koševo Stadium during the 1984 Winter Olympics opening ceremony

== Highlights ==
The official poster of the 1984 Winter Olympics

- The Olympic flag was raised upside down during the opening ceremony by mistake, a gaffe that was repeated at the 2024 Summer Olympics opening ceremony in Paris.
- First Games under the presidency of Juan Antonio Samaranch.
- The 20 kilometre race was added to women's Nordic skiing.
- Skier Jure Franko won Yugoslavia's first Winter Olympic medal; a silver in the giant slalom.
- Marja-Liisa Hämäläinen won all three individual cross-country races for women.
- Gaétan Boucher and Karin Enke each won two gold medals in speed skating, while East German women won all but three out of the twelve medals in the sport.
- Austria, usually a formidable winter sports nation, won only one bronze medal.
- Biathletes Eirik Kvalfoss and Peter Angerer earned a complete set of medals.
- Twin brothers Phil and Steve Mahre took first and second place in the slalom.
- Torvill and Dean of Great Britain earned across-the-board perfect scores for artistic impression in the free dance segment of the ice dance competition, a feat that was never matched. (Note: The 6.0 judging system has since been replaced with the ISU Judging System, therefore no other figure skater will earn perfect 6.0 scores in the future.)
- The gold medals for figure skating were split among four nations: while Torvill and Dean won the ice dance competition for Great Britain, Elena Valova and Oleg Vasiliev of the Soviet Union won the pair skating competition, Scott Hamilton won gold for the United States in the men's singles, and Katarina Witt won the first of two consecutive gold medals for East Germany in the ladies' singles competition.
- Disabled skiing was a demonstration sport for the first time.
- Bill Johnson became the first American to win an Olympic downhill event.
- Lamine Guèye of Senegal was the first Black African skier to compete in the Winter Olympics.
- The closing ceremony was held indoors in the figure skating venue. The next time the closing ceremony for the Winter Games was held indoors was the 2010 Winter Olympics in Vancouver.
- United States Vice President George H. W. Bush attended the opening ceremony of these games, and would later attend the 1984 Summer Olympics closing ceremony in Los Angeles, where the Olympic flag was next flown.

== Official mascot ==
Readers of Yugoslav newspapers were asked to choose the mascot for the 1984 Winter Olympics from a list of six finalists. The winner was Vučko, the little wolf, designed by Slovenian designer and illustrator Jože Trobec. The other finalists were a chipmunk, a lamb, a mountain goat, a porcupine, and a snowball. The Vučko is a long-time symbol of Sarajevo.

== Venues ==
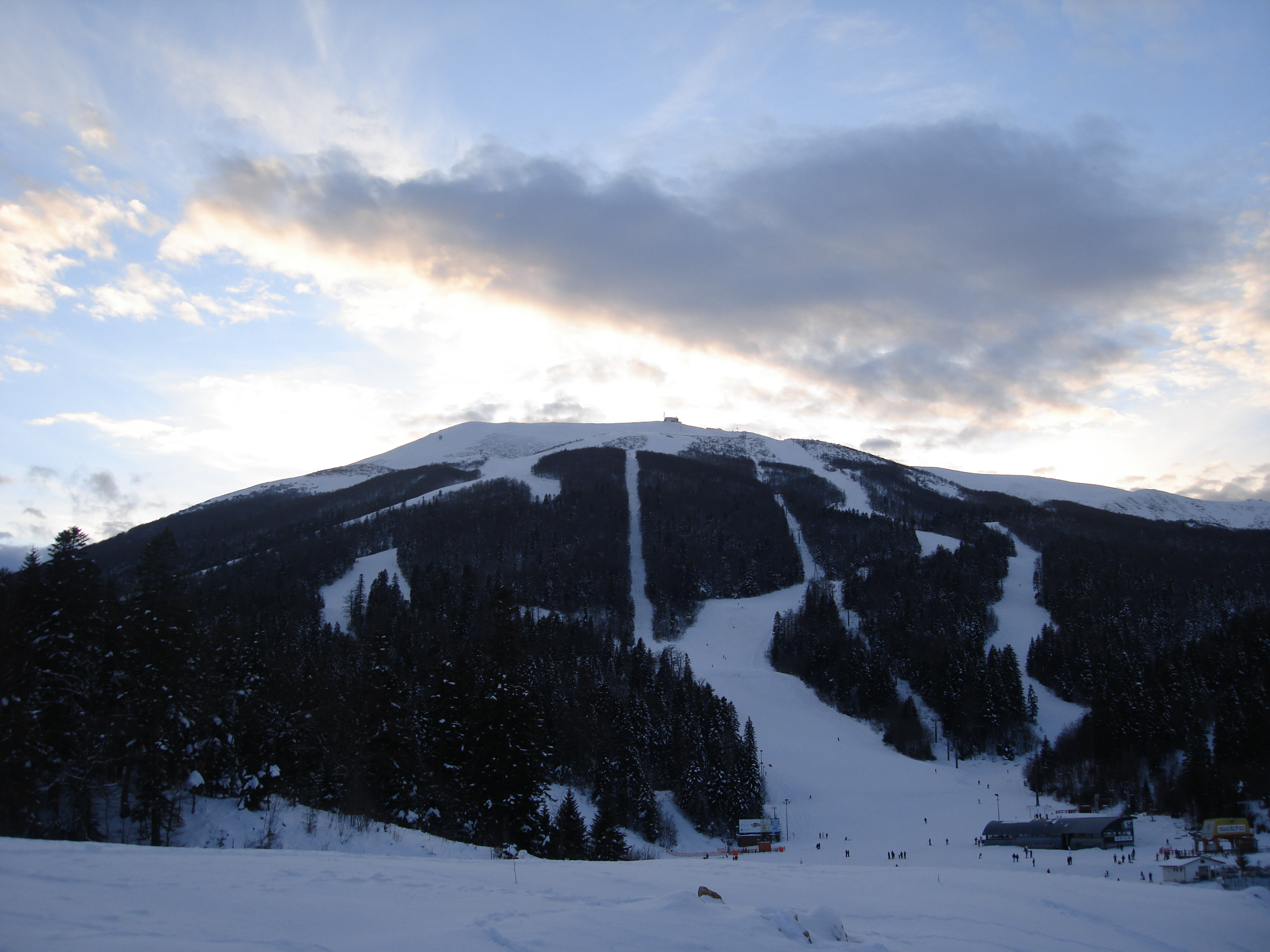
Bjelašnica alpine mountain

In 1978, the Sarajevo region had an artificial ice rink, a few cross-country ski trails and biathlon and alpine ski slopes. Most of the facilities remained to be built. The construction of the new venues began in the summer of 1979 and was completed in December 1982, which made it possible to organize 31 national and international test events during the pre-Olympic period. All the events took place in Sarajevo or at the neighbour resorts in the Dinaric Alps located less than 25 kilometers from the city's downtown.

The Koševo City Stadium, built in 1947 in the center of Sarajevo, was completely renovated to host the opening ceremony of the Games. Its capacity was 45,000. The Zetra Olympic Hall, with a capacity of 8,500, was built near the Koševo stadium for part of the ice hockey and figure skating events, as well as the closing ceremonies. The natural speed skating track was also set up in the same district. The Skenderija Complex, located in another part of town, was the main sporting venue of the city. It was renovated and expanded for the Games to include another temporary ice rink with a capacity of 8,500 seats, which hosted some games. The Skenderija Complex contained the main press center and the medal plaza, which for the first time was indoors.

The men's alpine ski races were held on Bjelašnica, the highest mountain at 2,067 meters located southwest of Sarajevo. The women's events were contested on Jahorina, at an altitude of 1,913 meters and located to the south-east of the city. The Nordic events took place on Igman, in an area near Mount Bjelašnica. Igman Olympic Jumps of 70 and 90 meters were built in Malo Polje. The already existing cross-country ski and biathlon tracks in Veliko Polje were redeveloped and a new shooting range installed for the biathlon. A bobsleigh and luge track, the first in the country's history, was built on the Trebević south-east of Sarajevo. The track has a length of 1300 meters and a drop of 126 meters.

=== Accommodation sites ===
The main Olympic village was built in the Mojmilo district of Sarajevo near the Koševo Stadium. Approximately 1,950 persons were accommodated in the 639 apartments available. The organizers built a secondary Olympic village on Mount Igman for athletes and coaches of cross-country skiing, Nordic combined and biathlon, with a capacity of 500 people. A press village built in the Dobrinja district accommodated representatives of the press, radio and television as well as accompanying staff with 2,100 apartments for a total of 8,500 beds. Members of the IOC, international sports federations, national committees and some NOCs with small delegations stayed in at existing Holiday Inn in Sarajevo comprising 340 rooms. Finally, another 19,400 beds were made available to tourists in minor hotels, private accommodation or rental apartments in the Sarajevo region. A total of nine hotels were built and seven more were renovated for the Games.

=== City venues ===
- Koševo Stadium – Opening ceremony
- Zetra Ice Hall – figure skating, ice hockey (finals), closing ceremonies
- Zetra Ice Rink – speed skating
- Skenderija – ice hockey (auxiliary venue), main press center and indoor medal plaza.

=== Mountain venues ===
- Bjelašnica – alpine skiing (men)
- Jahorina – alpine skiing (women)
- Igman, Veliko Polje – cross-country skiing, Nordic combined (cross-country skiing), biathlon
- Igman Olympic Jumps – Nordic combined (ski jumping), ski jumping
- Sarajevo Olympic Bobsleigh and Luge Track at Trebević – bobsleigh, luge

=== Other facilities ===
- Olympic Village, Mojmilo
- Press Village, Dobrinja

== Events ==
There were 39 events contested in 6 sports (10 disciplines).

- Alpine skiing (6)
- Biathlon (3)
- Bobsleigh (2)
- Cross-country skiing (8)
- Figure skating (4)
- Ice hockey (1)
- Luge (3)
- Nordic combined (1)
- Ski jumping (2)
- Speed skating (9)

=== Biathlon ===
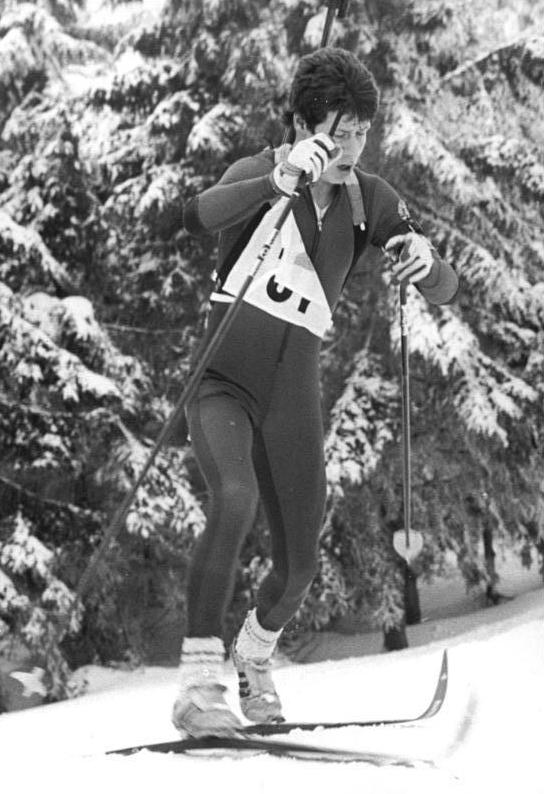
The Olympic champion Frank-Peter Rötsch in 1983

The biathlon events were held in Veliko Polje on Mount Igman.

Biathlon races began with the individual 20 km sprint. The 19-year-old East German Frank-Peter Rötsch quickly took the lead, but it was ultimately the West German Peter Angerer who won with a time one minute faster. Rötsch was second, and the bronze medal went to the Norwegian Eirik Kvalfoss. The next event was the 10 km sprint. Kvalfoss, world champion in 1982 and 1983, won the race despite two missed targets. Angerer won the silver medal due to a good finish and the East German Matthias Jacob was the bronze medalist. The reigning Olympic champion Frank Ullrich missed three targets and finished only 17th. The Soviets did not win an individual medal and were not favorites for the relay. Dmitriy Vasilyev, Juri Kashkarov, Algimantas Šalna and Sergei Bulygin won the race however; this was the fifth consecutive time that the Soviet Union had won gold in the relay since the start of the event in 1968. Norway finished second with 1:20 ahead of East Germany. Kvalfoss and Angerer therefore ended the Games with three medals in three different events.

=== Bobsleigh ===
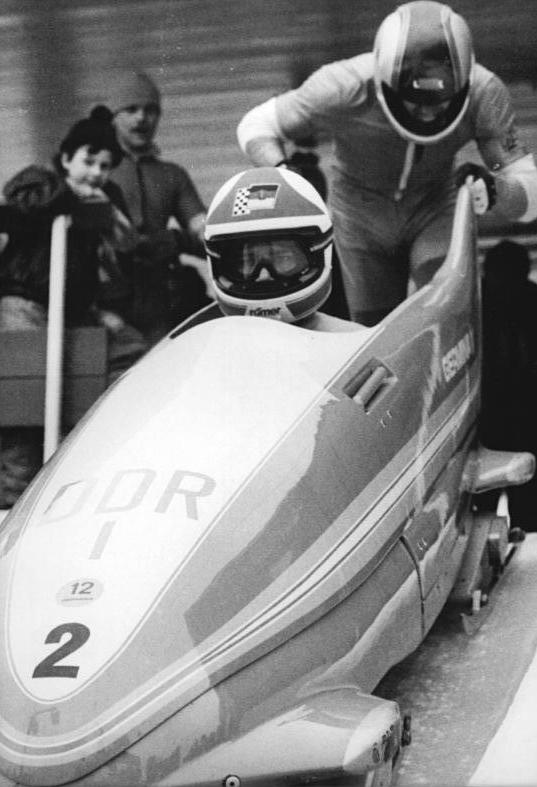
East Germans Wolfgang Hoppe and Dietmar Schauerhammer in 1985

The bobsleigh races took place on the bobsleigh/luge track built on the Trebević mountain. The East Germans dominated the discipline as they won the two gold medals and two silver medals. As of 2020, this performance has still not been matched.

East Germans Wolfgang Hoppe and Dietmar Schauerhammer won the two-man bobsleigh event setting the fastest time in three of the four runs. They finished half a second ahead of their compatriots Bernhard Lehmann and Bogdan Musiol. The bobsledders of the Soviet Union created a surprise by placing third and fourth while the Swiss, world champions in 1982 and 1983, had to be content with fifth and sixth places. Swede Carl-Erik Eriksson was the first athlete to compete in six editions of the Olympic Winter Games. At 53 years old, he was also the oldest athlete at the 1984 Games.

In the four-man bobsleigh event, Hoppe again finished first ahead of Lehmann while Silvio Giobellina's Swiss bobsleigh won the bronze medal. These three crews finished all the heats in the first three places and in the same order. The differences were large since the Swiss bob 2 crew, which came in fourth, was 2:68 behind.

=== Nordic Combined ===
The Nordic combined athletes competed in three jumps on the 70 meter hill, the two best being counted, then raced 15 kilometers on the tracks of Mount Igman the next day. The classification was established according to a points system. The Norwegian Tom Sandberg was in first place after the jumps. Among the other favorites, the Finns Rauno Miettinen and Jouko Karjalainen occupied the sixth and 15th ranks. Karjalainen won the cross-country ski race with 1:20.7 ahead of second-placed Sandberg, but it was not enough to overtake him in the final standings. Sandberg was the Olympic gold medal champion and Karjalainen silver medalist. Surprisingly, fifth in the two events, the Finn Jukka Ylipulli won the bronze medal and Miettenen, ninth in cross-country skiing, finished fourth.

=== Ice hockey ===
The ice hockey tournament took place on two rinks: the main was the Zetra Olympic Hall, which was built specifically for the Games, and the Skenderija rink. The twelve teams were divided into two groups of six, and the two best teams of each group qualified for the final pool, with any points acquired against the teams in the same pool being carried forward.

There was controversy over player eligibility in advance of the Games. The IOC regulations stated that players who had signed a professional contract could not participate, while the International Ice Hockey Federation ruled that only players who had played a professional match were deemed ineligible. Finally, all players who had signed a contract or played a game in the National Hockey League were ineligible to take part in the Games. Conversely, Soviets and Czechoslovaks who had participated in no other activity than ice hockey could participate without any restriction.

The Soviets won all their matches, notably thanks to the KLM Line made up of Vladimir Krutov, Igor Larionov, and Sergei Makarov. Continuing the tradition from the 1964 to 1976 Games, the Soviet Union won the gold medal with a 2–0 win over the Czechoslovaks who took silver. Sweden defeated Canada 2–0 to win the bronze.

=== Luge ===
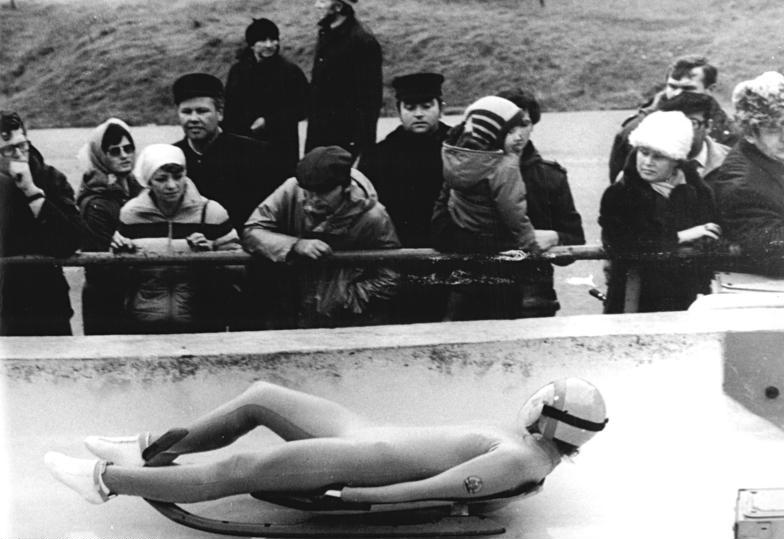
Gold medalist Steffi Martin in 1983

The luge competitions were held on the Sarajevo Olympic Bobsleigh and Luge Track built on the Trebević mountain. The East German Torsten Görlitzer and the Italian Ernst Haspinger dominated the first two rounds of the men's event, but they both lost time in the third round. The Italian Paul Hildgartner, silver medalist in 1980, set the best time of the last two races and became Olympic champion. The podium was completed by the Soviets Sergey Danilin and Valery Dudin. This was the first time that East Germany had not won a medal in the men's luge competition at the Olympic Games since 1964.

East Germany dominated the women's event, taking the first three places in every round. World champion in 1983, Steffi Martin won all four races and won the gold medal, Bettina Schmidt won the silver medal, and Ute Oberhoffner won bronze.

The doubles event was very close as the Soviets Yevgeny Belousov and Aleksandr Belyakov were first by 6.7 hundredths of a second after the opening round, but a small mistake at the end of the second and final round cost them the victory. The West Germans Hans Stangassinger and Franz Wembacher won the Olympic title, 4 hundredths of a second ahead of Belousov and Beliakov, and the East Germans Jörg Hoffmann and Jochen Pietzsch won bronze.

=== Figure skating ===
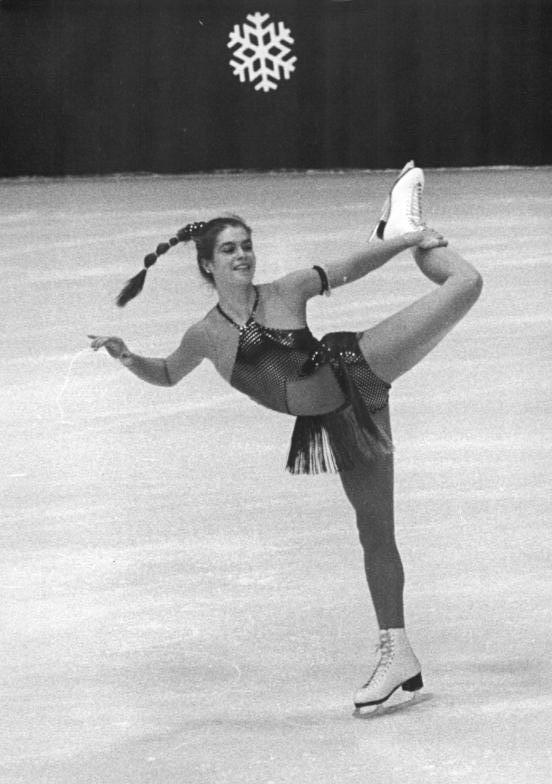
Katarina Witt in 1985

The figure skating events took place at the Zetra Ice Hall. The American Scott Hamilton, world champion from 1981 to 1983, was first after the compulsory figures of the men's competition. The Canadian Brian Orser won the short program and the free skate ahead of Hamilton. Orser, who finished seventh in the compulsory figures, won the silver medal, while Hamilton won gold. The bronze medal went to Czechoslovak Jozef Sabovčík.

The favorites in the women's competition were the Americans Elaine Zayak and Rosalynn Sumners, world champions in 1982 and 1983, respectively, as well as East Germany's Katarina Witt. Zayak was only thirteenth in the compulsory figures, which Sumners won, and Witt came third. The East German won the short program while Sumners took fifth place. In the free skate, Witt had a good performance that allowed her to win the gold medal while Sumners, who had a less difficult program than expected, settled for the silver medal. The Soviet Kira Ivanova took third place.

The Soviets Elena Valova and Oleg Vassiliev, world champions in 1983, won the short program and the free program and finished in first place in the pairs event. American siblings Kitty and Peter Carruthers were second and another Soviet pair, Larisa Seleznyova and Oleg Makarov, finished third.

British ice dancers Jayne Torvill and Christopher Dean did not disappoint the public. They performed an original program set to the music of Boléro by Maurice Ravel and the nine judges give them the maximum score of six for artistic impression. Torvill and Dean become Olympic champions ahead of two Soviet couples (Natalia Bestemianova/Andrei Bukin and Marina Klimova/Sergei Ponomarenko).

=== Speed skating ===
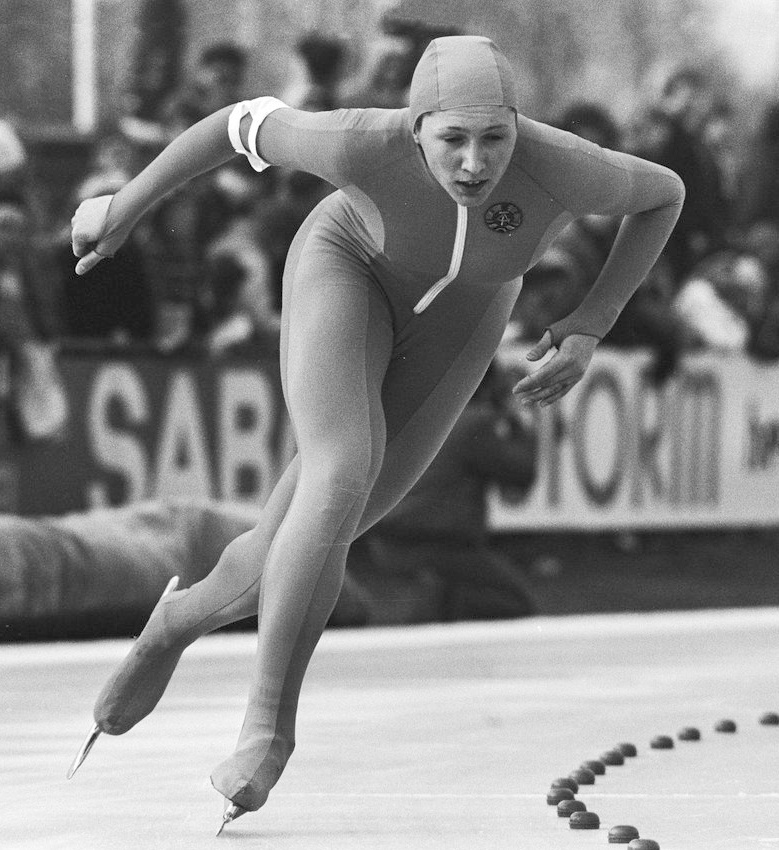
Karin Enke (pictured in 1983) won four medals in Sarajevo.

For the Games, an outdoor track was constructed with natural ice near the Zetra Olympic Hall. The Soviet Sergey Fokichev won the 500 meters ahead of the Japanese skater Yoshihiro Kitazawa. Erroll Fraser, representing the British Virgin Islands, was the first athlete from the Caribbean to compete in a Winter Games. After finishing third in the 500 meters, the Canadian Gaétan Boucher won the 1,000 and the 1,500 meters; the Quebecer ended the Games with three medals. Soviet Sergey Khlebnikov was second in these two races and the bronze medals were awarded to the Norwegian Kai Arne Engelstad and the Soviet Oleg Bozhev respectively. The Swede Tomas Gustafson, who picked up the training techniques of Eric Heiden, won the 5,000 meters ahead of the Soviet Igor Malkov. In the 10,000 meters, Malkov was this time ahead of Gustafson. The East German René Schöfisch finished third in the two events.

East Germany dominated the women's events, winning all of the gold and silver medals as well as a bronze medal, taking nine medals out of the twelve available. Karin Enke, who had won several world titles since winning the 500 meters Olympic gold in 1980, was the favorite in all four races. In the first event, the 1,500 meters, she easily won the gold medal by breaking the world record. She finished ahead of Andrea Ehrig and the Soviet Natalya Petrusyova, who were also among the favorites. The world record holder Christa Luding won the 500 meters ahead of Enke and the Soviet Natalya Glebova. The 1,000 meters podium was identical to that of the 1,500 meters contested three days earlier. In the last race, the 3,000 meters, the East Germans won all three medals: Ehrig ahead of Enke and Gabi Zange. This was the third time that a country had won the first three places in an Olympic speed skating event. Enke ended the Games with four medals and Ehring with three.

=== Ski jumping ===
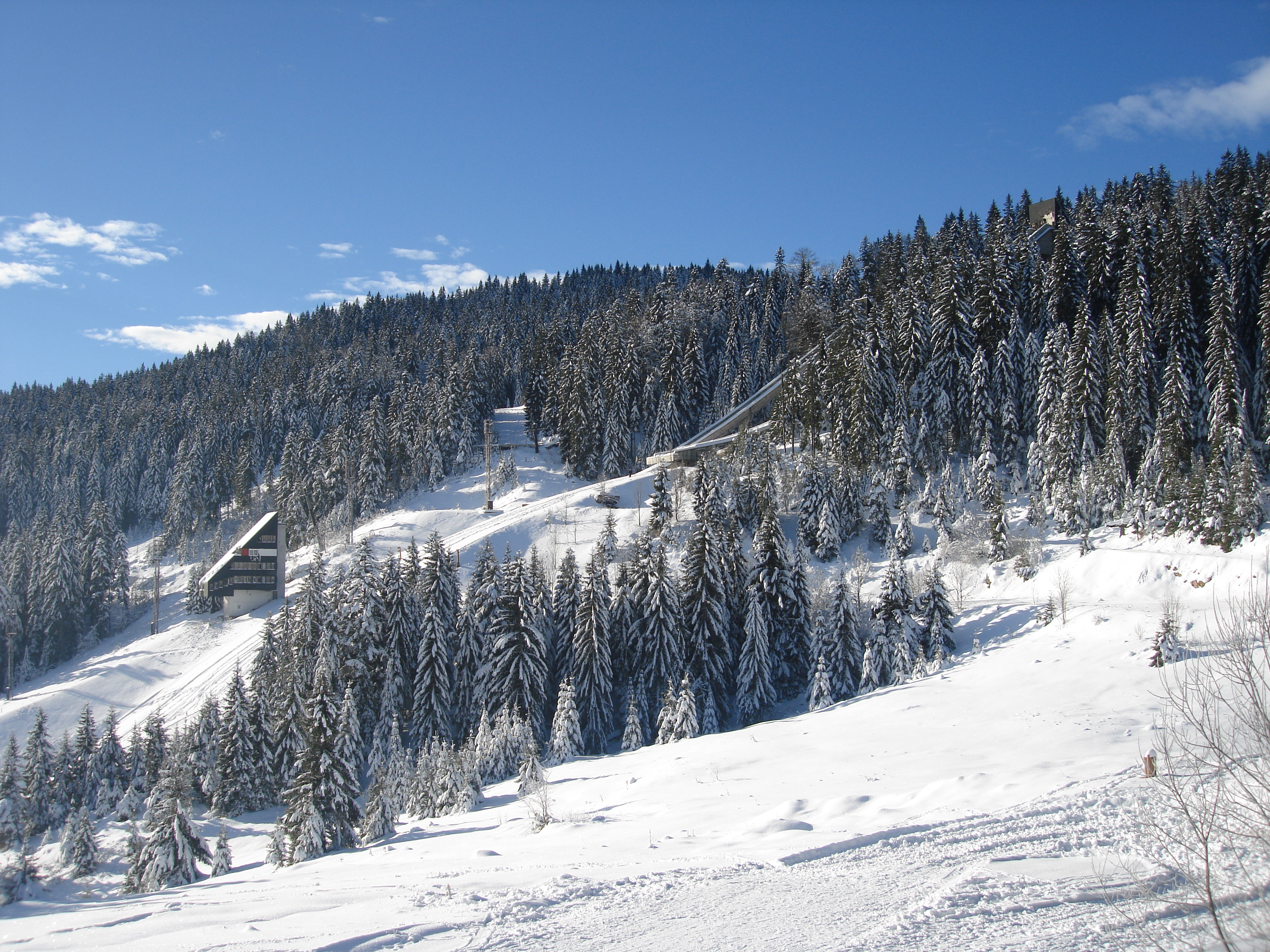
The ski jumping hills of Mount Igman

The ski jumping events took place on the Igman hills, southwest of Sarajevo in windy weather conditions. On the normal hill, 20-year-old Matti Nykänen of Finland led the standings after the first round by achieving a jump of 91 meters. The 19-year-old East German Jens Weissflog was second with a jump of 90 meters. In the second run, Weissflog jumped to 87 meters and Nykänen, who would have won gold with a jump of 86 meters, landed at 84 meters. The East German was the Olympic champion ahead of the Finn. Jari Puikkonen, also Finnish, produced the best jump of the event: a jump of 91.5 meters allowed him to move up from 21st to third place. The final scores were close: there was a 1.2 point difference between the first and the second as well as between the second and the third.

Nykänen largely dominated the event on the big hill. He jumped to 116 meters in the first run, while Weissflog only reached 107 meters. The Finn increased his lead by also producing the best jump of the second set. He won the Olympic title with a 17.5 points lead, the biggest gap between first and second in Olympic ski jumping history. Weissflog finished second and Czechoslovak Pavel Ploc took third place.

=== Alpine skiing ===
The alpine skiing races took place on two different mountains: the men's events were contested on Bjelašnica and the women's events on Jahorina. The events started on February 13, four days behind schedule, because of strong winds and heavy snowfall.

The American Bill Johnson, winner at Wengen in January, won the downhill ahead of the Swiss Peter Müller and the Austrian Anton Steiner. Johnson became the first American male to win a downhill medal in alpine skiing at the Olympic Games. The Swede Ingemar Stenmark, considered one of the best skiers in the world in technical events, surrendered his Olympic eligibility in order to negotiate an agreement with the Swedish Ski Association to personally retain more of his sponsorship money. Also missing was Marc Girardelli, who previously refused to train with the Austrian team and competed under the Luxembourg flag. Girardelli did not have Luxembourg citizenship and was not permitted to compete in the Games. The Swiss Max Julen set the fastest time of the first heat and the second of the second heat and became Olympic champion.

The Slovenian Jure Franko, winner of the second round and second in the final standings, won the first Yugoslav medal in the history of the Winter Games. The bronze medal went to Andreas Wenzel of Liechtenstein. The American Phil Mahre, favorite in Stenmark's absence, finished first in the slalom ahead of his twin brother Steve. This was the eighth time that siblings had taken the top two places in an individual Olympic event, but the Mahres were the first twins to achieve this performance. The French Didier Bouvet won the bronze medal. Both Mahre brothers retired from professional skiing after the Games at the age of 26.

The Swiss Michela Figini won her first World Cup race two weeks before the Games. First of three of the five training heats in Sarajevo, she won the downhill ahead of her compatriot Maria Walliser and the Czechoslovak Olga Charvátová. At 17 years old, Figini became the youngest Olympic champion in alpine skiing. The giant slalom podium was unexpected: the American Debbie Armstrong, who had never won a World Cup race, won gold ahead of her compatriot Christin Cooper. The Frenchwoman Perrine Pelen was third while another American, Tamara McKinney, finished in fourth place. Only 21 of the 45 starters completed the two heats of the slalom. The Frenchwoman Christelle Guignard won the first round but did not complete the second. The Italian Paoletta Magoni, fourth in the first round and winner of the second round, became Olympic champion despite having also never won the World Cup. Pelen won a second medal, silver, ahead of Liechtenstein's Ursula Konzett.

=== Cross-country skiing ===
The cross-country skiing races took place in Veliko Polje, on the Igman mountain. A new technique, skate skiing, was widely used at the 1984 Games. However, it was prohibited on the last 200 meters of each race to avoid falls. The women's 20 kilometers, contested at the 1978 and 1982 World Championships, appeared at the Olympic Games.

In the 15 kilometers, the Finn Harri Kirvesniemi led the race after 5.8 kilometers, but it was the Swede Gunde Svan who won. Aki Karvonen and Kirvesniemi, both Finnish, completed the podium. The 30 kilometers took place under difficult conditions. Three-time Olympic champion in 1980, the Soviet Nikolaj Zimjatov, won another gold medal ahead of his compatriot Alexander Savjalov and Svan. Zimjatov was the third cross-country skier ever to win four Olympic titles after the Swede Sixten Jernberg and the Soviet Galina Kulakova. After a tight 50 kilometers, the Swede Thomas Wassberg took the gold, just 4.9 seconds ahead of Svan, while Karvonen finished third. In the 4 × 10 kilometer relay, Svan, the last rider of the Swedish team, took ten seconds ahead of the Soviet, Zimjatov, and finished in first place. Finland, eighth after the first skier, took the bronze medal. Svan ended his Games with four medals (two gold, one silver, and one bronze).

After unsuccessfully competing in the 1976 and 1980 Olympics, Finland's Marja-Liisa Hämäläinen led the overall World Cup standings in 1983. In Sarajevo, she first won the 10 kilometers almost 19 seconds ahead of the Soviet Raisa Smetanina, the Olympic champion in 1976. The Norwegian Brit Pettersen won the bronze medal. Hämäläinen then won the 5 kilometers, 10 seconds ahead of the Norwegian Berit Aunli and 14 seconds ahead of the Czechoslovak Květoslava Jeriová-Pecková. She also won the 20 kilometers ahead of Smetanina and the Norwegian Anne Jahren. Norway, already in the lead after the first skier, won the 4 × 5 kilometers. Czechoslovakia won their first Olympic relay medal, silver, two seconds ahead of Finland who won the bronze medal. Hämäläinen, who won all three individual events as well as bronze in the relay, was the only three-time gold medalist of these Games.

=== Demonstration sport ===
- Disabled skiing

== Calendar ==
The 1984 Winter Olympics took place from Wednesday 8 to Sunday 19 February, the dates were chosen to extend over twelve days and two weekends, like the previous editions. However, due to the competition format the ice hockey tournament began on February 7, one day before the opening ceremony. The number of events increased from thirty-eight to thirty-nine, as the 20 kilometers women's skiing event was added to the cross-country skiing competitions. Around 430,000 attended the competitions.

All dates are in Central European Time (UTC+1)

| OC | Opening ceremony | ● | Event competitions | 1 | Event finals | CC | Closing ceremony |

| February | 7th Tue | 8th Wed | 9th Thu | 10th Fri | 11th Sat | 12th Sun | 13th Mon | 14th Tue | 15th Wed | 16th Thu | 17th Fri | 18th Sat | 19th Sun | Events |
|---|---|---|---|---|---|---|---|---|---|---|---|---|---|---|
| Ceremonies | | OC | | | | | | | | | | | CC | —N/a |
| Alpine skiing | | | | | | | 1 | 1 | | 2 | 1 | | 1 | 6 |
| Biathlon | | | | | 1 | | | 1 | | | 1 | | | 3 |
| Bobsleigh | | | | ● | 1 | | | | | | ● | 1 | | 2 |
| Cross country skiing | | | 1 | 1 | | 1 | 1 | | 1 | 1 | | 1 | 1 | 8 |
| Figure skating | | | | ● | | 1 | ● | 1 | ● | 1 | | 1 | | 4 |
| Ice hockey | ● | | ● | | ● | | ● | | ● | | ● | | 1 | 1 |
| Luge | | | ● | ● | ● | 2 | | | 1 | | | | | 3 |
| Nordic combined | | | | | ● | 1 | | | | | | | | 1 |
| Ski jumping | | | | | | 1 | | | | | | 1 | | 2 |
| Speed skating | | | 1 | 2 | | 1 | 1 | 1 | 1 | 1 | | 1 | | 9 |
| Daily medal events | | | 2 | 3 | 2 | 7 | 3 | 4 | 3 | 5 | 2 | 5 | 3 | 39 |
| Cumulative total | | | 2 | 5 | 7 | 14 | 17 | 21 | 24 | 29 | 31 | 36 | 39 | 39 |
| February | 7th Tue | 8th Wed | 9th Thu | 10th Fri | 11th Sat | 12th Sun | 13th Mon | 14th Tue | 15th Wed | 16th Thu | 17th Fri | 18th Sat | 19th Sun | Total events |

=== Weather conditions ===
The organizers had to face bad weather conditions at the start of the Games. During the night of 8 to 9 February, 40 centimeters of snow fell in Sarajevo and up to one meter on mountain sites. On February 9, the men's downhill skiing was postponed due to winds blowing up to 200 km/h and the other events were held several hours late. The situation did not improve over the following days. The biathlon, cross-country skiing, Nordic combined, ski jumping, bobsleigh and luge events were contested according to the schedule in difficult weather conditions while the alpine ski races only started on February 13.

=== Opening ceremony ===
The opening ceremony took place on February 8 in front of 45,000 spectators at Koševo City Stadium. It included hundreds of musicians and dancers from different regions of Yugoslavia. After the parade of athletes, the Olympic flag was presented from the Lake Placid Mayor to the Mayor of Sarajevo Uglješa Uzelac. Alpine skier Bojan Križaj and referee Dragan Perović took the Olympic oath and figure skater Sanda Dubravčić lit the Olympic cauldron. Afterwards, the president of Yugoslavia Mika Špiljak declared the Games officially open.

=== Closing ceremony ===
The closing ceremony took place the evening of February 19 at the indoor Zetra Olympic Hall. After the parade of athletes, Juan Antonio Samaranch, who marked his first Olympiad as IOC president, thanked the organizers and declared the Games closed. The Olympic flag was lowered and the Olympic flame was extinguished at 20:21.

== Medal count ==
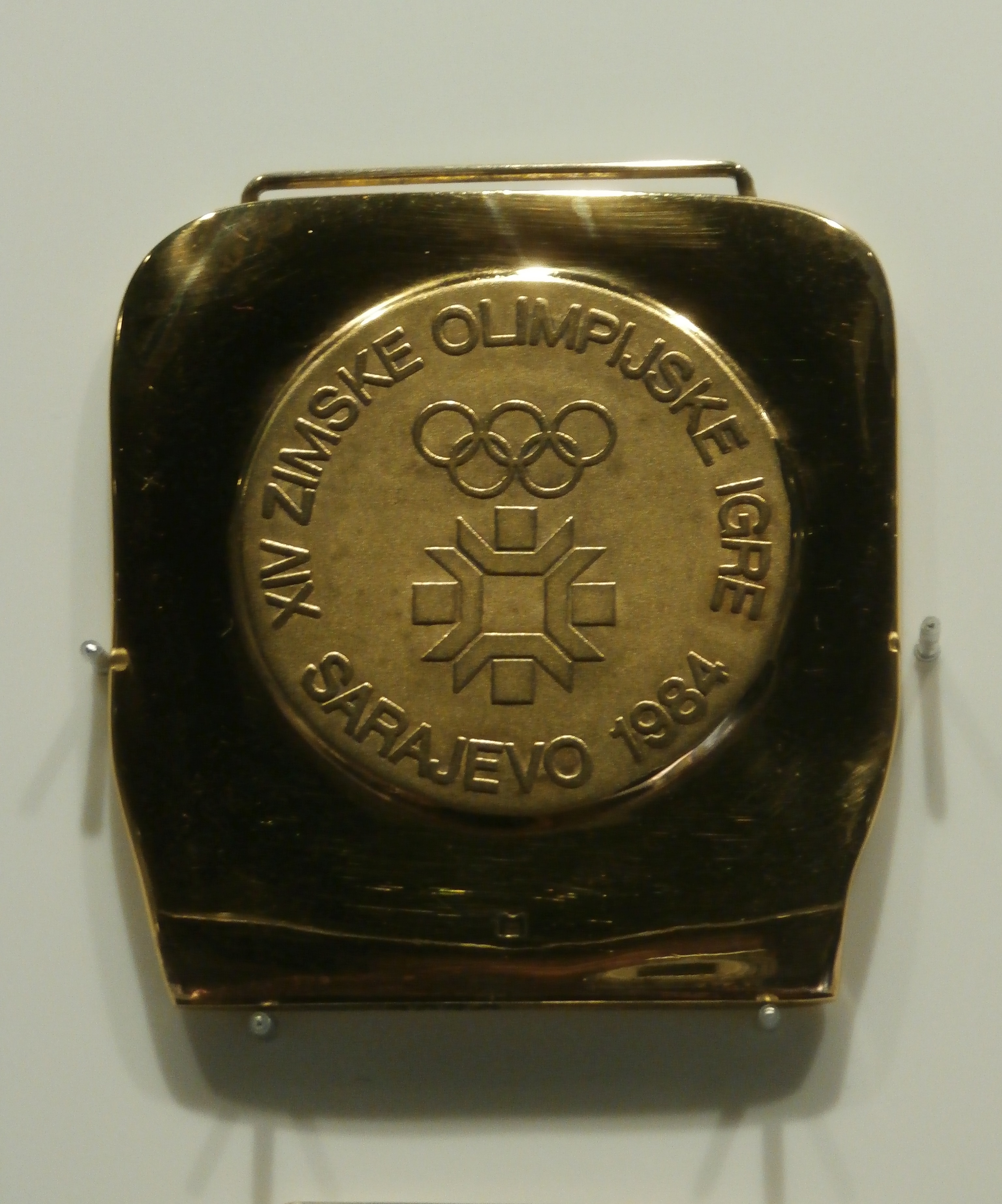
A gold medal from the 1984 Winter Olympics.

Seventeen of the forty-nine nations participating in these Games won at least one medal, as detailed in the table below. Second behind the Soviet Union from 1972 to 1980, East Germany won twenty-four medals, nine of which were gold. East German athletes won all of the gold and silver medals in women's speed skating and bobsleigh. The Soviet Union won twenty-five medals, six of which were gold. In cross-country skiing, the Soviet athletes won only one gold medal, against four in 1980. The United States won eight medals, including four gold, and achieved one of their best performances in alpine skiing history (five medals, three of which were gold).

Northern European countries occupied the following ranks: Finland was fourth (with three gold medals by cross-country skier Marja-Liisa Hämäläinen), Sweden fifth, and Norway sixth. The host country finished with one silver medal, the first time that Yugoslavia won a medal at the Olympic Winter Games. Austria, which finished fourth in 1980, ended the Games with only one medal, a bronze, Austria's worst result in the history of the Winter Olympics.

| Rank | Nation | Gold | Silver | Bronze | Total |
|---|---|---|---|---|---|
| 1 | East Germany | 9 | 9 | 6 | 24 |
| 2 | Soviet Union | 6 | 10 | 9 | 25 |
| 3 | United States | 4 | 4 | 0 | 8 |
| 4 | Finland | 4 | 3 | 6 | 13 |
| 5 | Sweden | 4 | 2 | 2 | 8 |
| 6 | Norway | 3 | 2 | 4 | 9 |
| 7 | Switzerland | 2 | 2 | 1 | 5 |
| 8 | Canada | 2 | 1 | 1 | 4 |
| 8 | West Germany | 2 | 1 | 1 | 4 |
| 10 | Italy | 2 | 0 | 0 | 2 |
| Totals (10 entries) | | 38 | 34 | 30 | 102 |

=== Podium sweeps ===
| Date | Sport | Event | NOC | Gold | Silver | Bronze |
|---|---|---|---|---|---|---|
| 12 February | Luge | Women's singles | East Germany | Steffi Walter-Martin | Bettina Schmidt | Ute Oberhoffner-Weiß |
| 15 February | Speed skating | Women's 3000 metres | East Germany | Andrea Schöne | Karin Enke | Gabi Schönbrunn |

=== Individual athletes ===
Seven athletes won at least two gold medals at these Games. The Finnish cross-country skier Marja-Liisa Hämäläinen finished with three gold medals and one bronze. She was followed by East Germany Karin Enke, who won two gold and two silver in speed skating, and Swedish cross-country skier Gunde Svan who also won four medals (two gold, one silver and one bronze).

== Participants ==
=== Participating nations ===
A then record of 49 National Olympic Committees (NOCs) entered 1,272 athletes in the Sarajevo Games. This was a large increase from the 1,072 athletes from 37 countries in the 1980 Winter Games. All the countries present at Lake Placid in 1980 once again participated in Sarajevo. The British Virgin Islands, Egypt, Monaco, Puerto Rico and Senegal participated in their first Winter games. Chile, North Korea, Morocco, Mexico, San Marino, Chinese Taipei and Turkey, absent in 1980, returned in 1984.

The People's Republic of China ended its boycott of the Olympic Games over the controversy regarding the IOC's recognition of the Republic of China (Taiwan). The Republic of China (Taiwan) then competed as Chinese Taipei for the first time.

Participating National Olympic Committees
- Andorra (2)
- Argentina (18)
- Australia (10)
- Austria (65)
- Belgium (4)
- Bolivia (3)
- British Virgin Islands (1)
- Bulgaria (16)
- Canada (67)
- Chile (4)
- China (37)
- Chinese Taipei (12)
- Costa Rica (3)
- Cyprus (5)
- Czechoslovakia (50)
- East Germany (56)
- Egypt (1)
- Finland (45)
- France (32)
- Great Britain (50)
- Greece (6)
- Hungary (9)
- Iceland (5)
- Italy (74)
- Japan (39)
- Lebanon (4)
- Liechtenstein (10)
- Mexico (1)
- Monaco (1)
- Mongolia (4)
- Morocco (4)
- Netherlands (13)
- New Zealand (6)
- North Korea (6)
- Norway (58)
- Poland (30)
- Puerto Rico (1)
- Romania (19)
- San Marino (3)
- Senegal (1)
- South Korea (15)
- Soviet Union (99)
- Spain (12)
- Sweden (60)
- Switzerland (42)
- Turkey (7)
- United States (107) (top nation)
- West Germany (84)
- Yugoslavia (72) (host)

=== Number of athletes by National Olympic Committees ===
| IOC Letter Code | Country | Athletes |
|---|---|---|
| USA | United States | 107 |
| URS | Soviet Union | 99 |
| FRG | West Germany | 84 |
| ITA | Italy | 74 |
| YUG | Yugoslavia | 72 |
| CAN | Canada | 67 |
| AUT | Austria | 65 |
| SWE | Sweden | 60 |
| NOR | Norway | 58 |
| GDR | East Germany | 56 |
| TCH | Czechoslovakia | 50 |
| GBR | Great Britain | 50 |
| FIN | Finland | 45 |
| SUI | Switzerland | 42 |
| JPN | Japan | 39 |
| CHN | China | 37 |
| FRA | France | 32 |
| POL | Poland | 30 |
| ROM | Romania | 19 |
| ARG | Argentina | 18 |
| BUL | Bulgaria | 16 |
| KOR | South Korea | 15 |
| HOL | Netherlands | 13 |
| TPE | Chinese Taipei | 12 |
| ESP | Spain | 12 |
| AUS | Australia | 10 |
| LIE | Liechtenstein | 10 |
| HUN | Hungary | 9 |
| TUR | Turkey | 7 |
| GRE | Greece | 6 |
| PRK | North Korea | 6 |
| NZL | New Zealand | 6 |
| CYP | Cyprus | 5 |
| ISL | Iceland | 5 |
| BEL | Belgium | 4 |
| CHI | Chile | 4 |
| CRC | Costa Rica | 4 |
| LIB | Lebanon | 4 |
| MGL | Mongolia | 4 |
| MAR | Morocco | 4 |
| BOL | Bolivia | 3 |
| SMR | San Marino | 3 |
| AND | Andorra | 2 |
| IVB | British Virgin Islands | 1 |
| EGY | Egypt | 1 |
| MEX | Mexico | 1 |
| MON | Monaco | 1 |
| PUR | Puerto Rico | 1 |
| SEN | Senegal | 1 |
| Total | | 1,272 |

== Impact ==
=== Reactions ===
The Sarajevo Games were considered a big success for their time. After the games, the trails were well maintained despite the bad weather conditions, the security services were discreet and the transport system worked well. The international media considered this edition more festive and warm than the Games held 4 years before. The competition has not yet left debts or losses for the organizing committee, for the city or even for the country.

=== Legacy ===
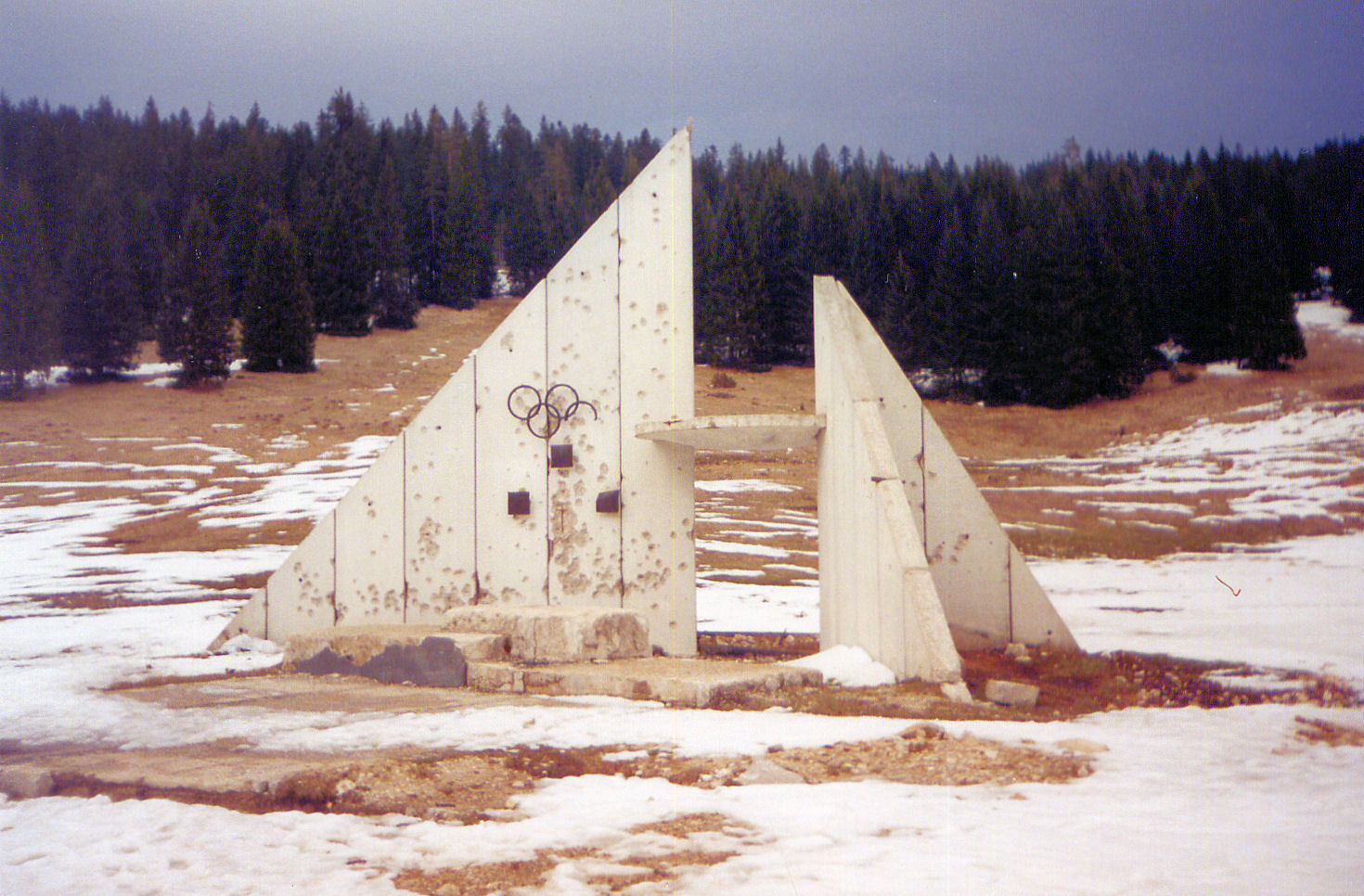
Olympic symbol damaged during the war in Bosnia and Herzegovina

The Olympic Games had a positive impact on Sarajevo. The expansion of the airport, the renovation of the main train and bus stations and the expansion of the number of hotels, restaurants and parks increased the quality of life in the city. The Olympic Village became a residential area and new sports venues accelerated the development of winter sports in Yugoslavia. After the Games, the Sarajevo bobsleigh track hosted several events of the Bobsleigh World Cup.

The war in Bosnia and Herzegovina and the siege of Sarajevo, not foreseen at the time of the Games, lasted from 1992 to 1995. The conflict left tens of thousands of victims and severely damaged Sarajevo and Olympic venues. The Koševo stadium was renovated in 1998, the Zetra hall was rebuilt in 1999 with the support of the IOC and the alpine ski resorts are again in operation. However, the bobsleigh runs and the ski jumping hills are abandoned due to the risk of accidents with landmines and remains of weapons.

In 2001, the city of Sarajevo considered a bid for the organization of the 2010 Winter Olympics to revive the economy of Bosnia and Herzegovina and accelerate the reunification of the country, divided between different ethnic groups. However, the bid was eliminated by the IOC Executive Board. The 2017 European Youth Winter Olympic Festival was to take place in Sarajevo (with all the events to be held on the sites used in 1984), but due to the constant delays in the recovery works, the city decided to reverse the order of the hosts with Erzurum in Turkey hosting the 2017 edition and Sarajevo hosting the 2019 European Youth Olympic Winter Festival.

== Gallery ==
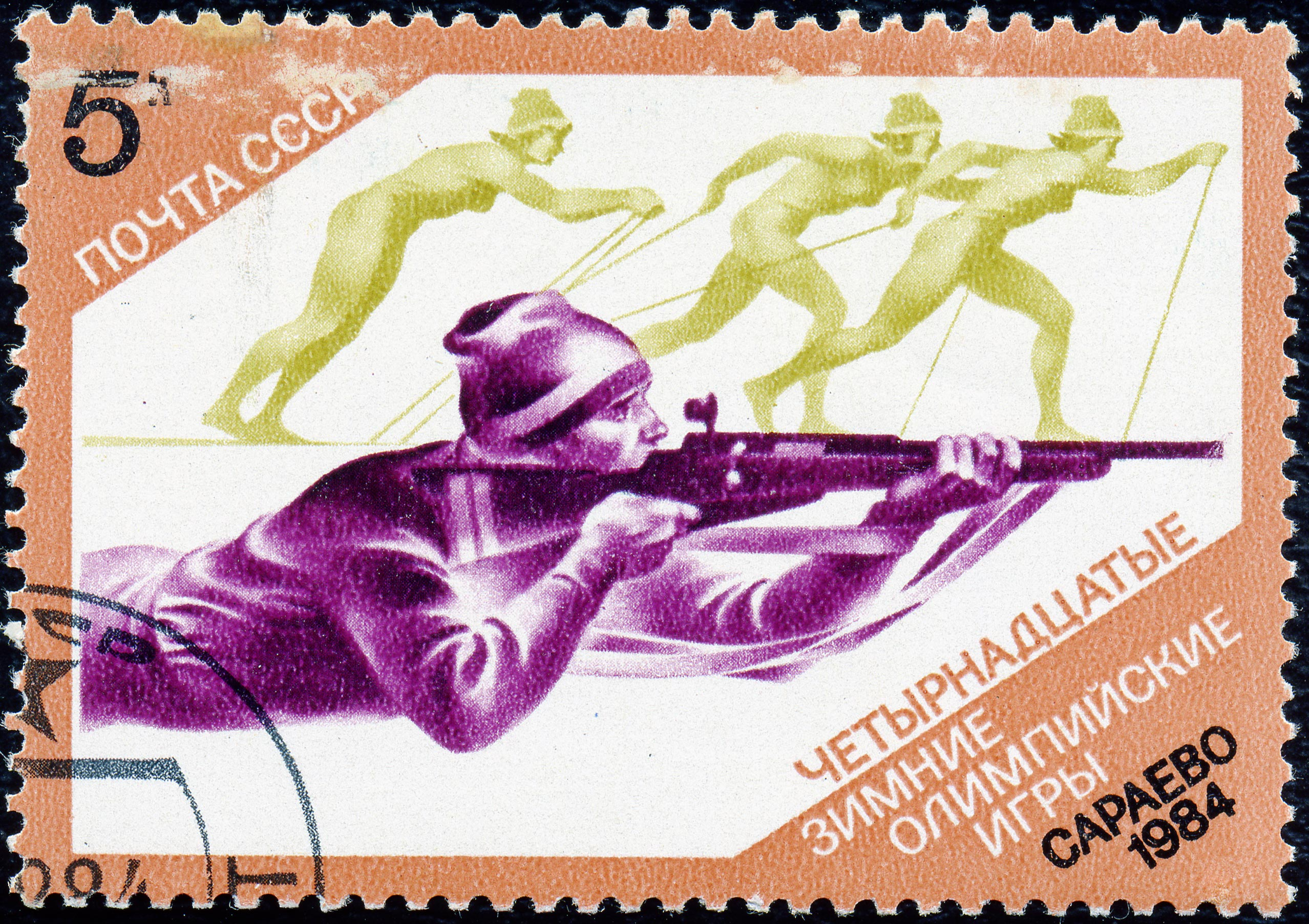
1984 Soviet postage stamp

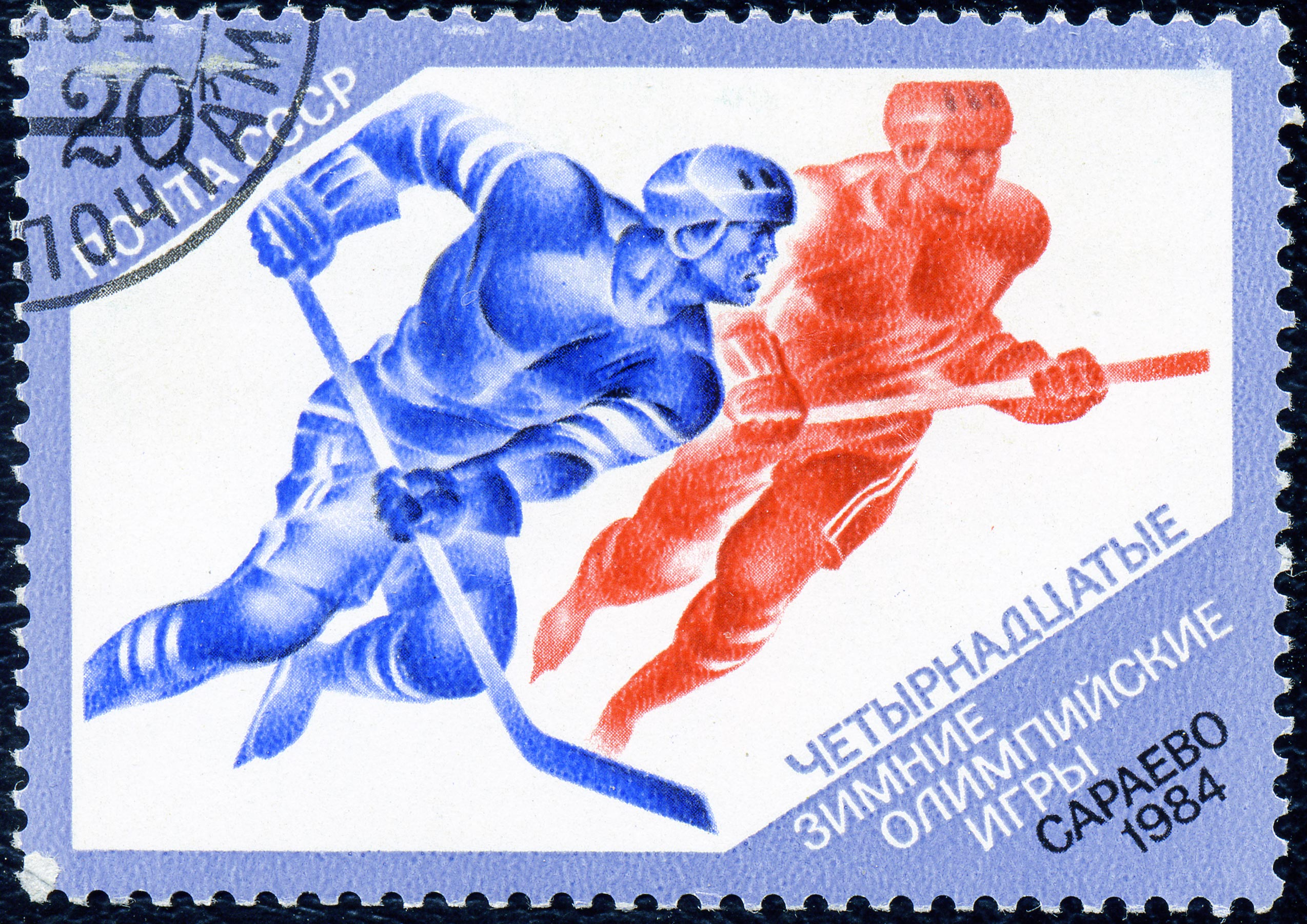
1984 Soviet postage stamp

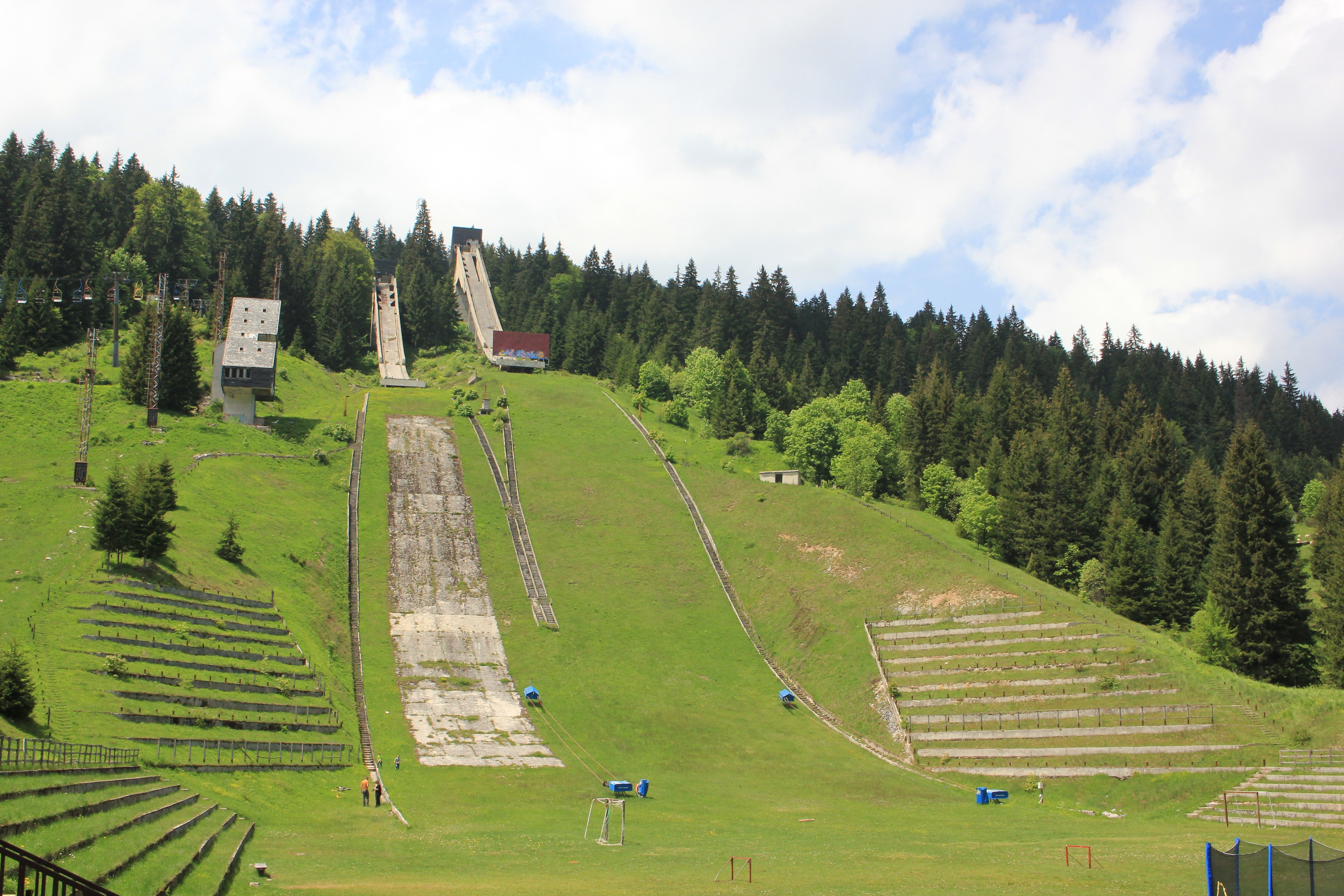
Igman ski-jumping hills during spring

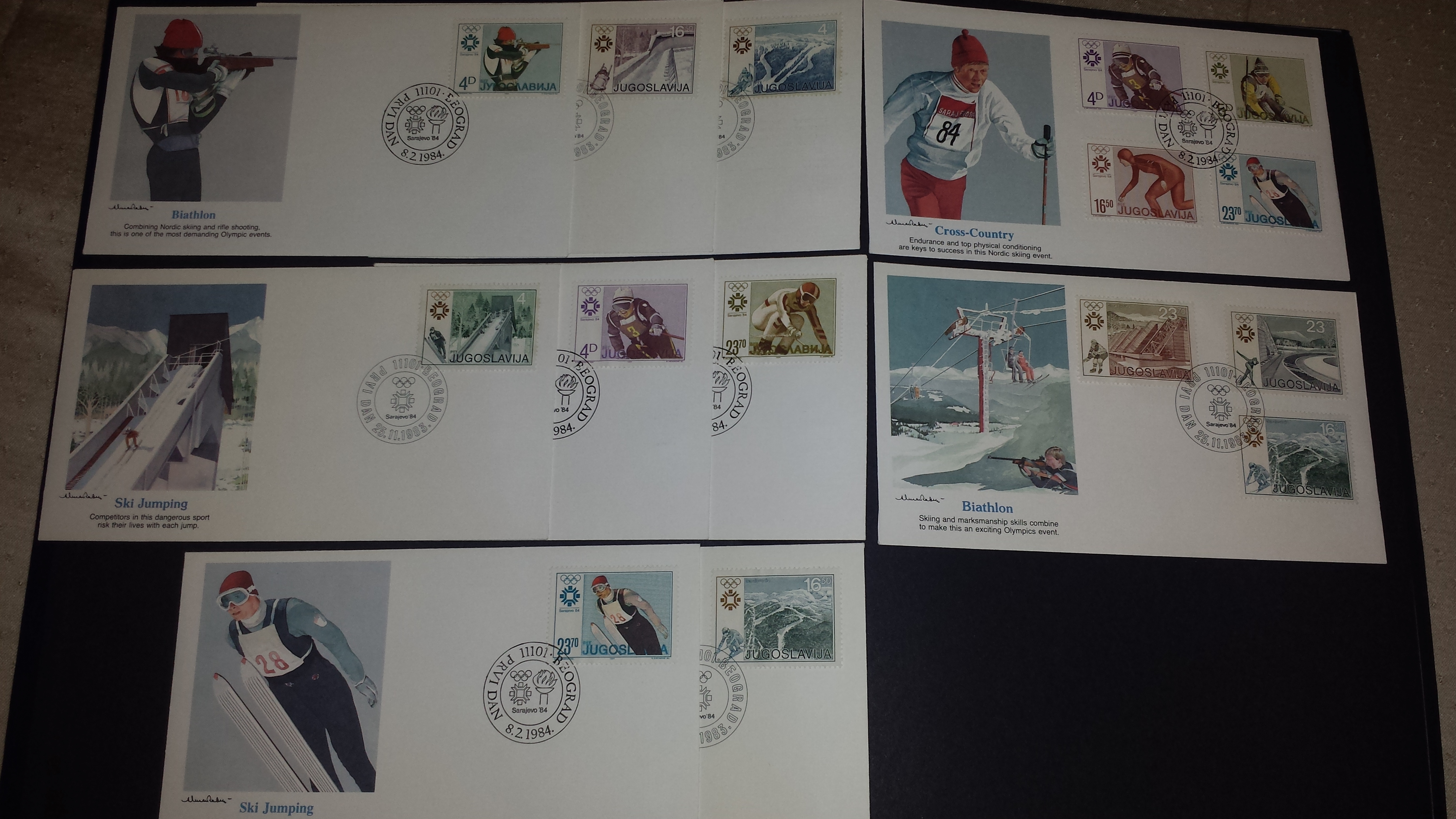
Yugoslavia postage stamps FDC (Sarajevo 1984 Winter Olympics)

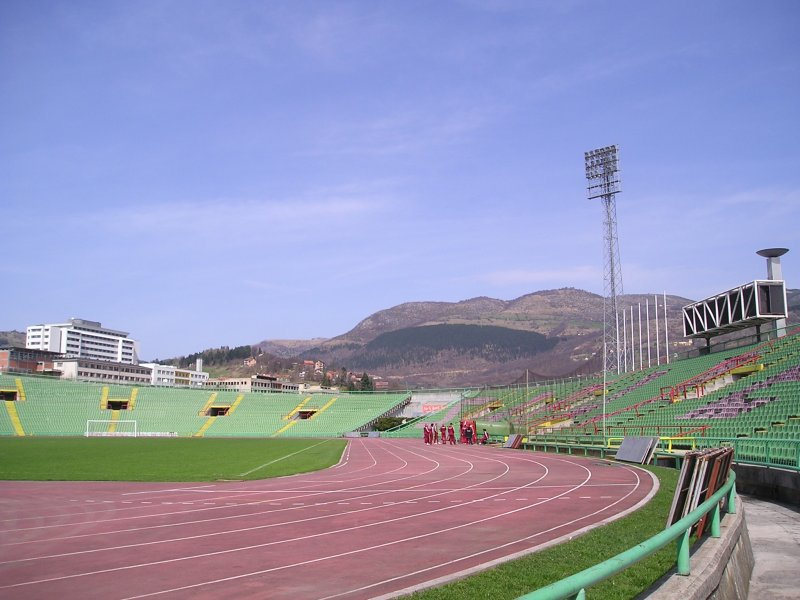
Stadion Asim Ferhatović - Hase (Koševo Stadium then)

== See also ==
- 1984 Winter Paralympics
- 1984 Summer Paralympics
- 1984 Summer Olympics
- List of IOC country codes
- Sarajevo Winter Olympics Museum

== Notes ==
Winter Olympics
| Preceded by Lake Placid | XIV Olympic Winter Games; Sarajevo; 1984 | Succeeded by Calgary |
