= Lasse Efskind =

Norwegian speed skater

Lasse Daniel Efskind (born 13 February 1944) is a Norwegian medical doctor, primarily known for his speedskating career and his books. He is the son of Leif Efskind (1904–1987), professor of medicine at the University of Oslo and a pioneer in the field of heart operations.

Efskind burst onto the international speedskating scene already at age 17, when he won (in samalogue point-sum) an international two-day meet at Bislett in January 1962, against stars such as Rudie Liebrechts, Henk van der Grift, Knut Johannesen, Nils Aaness. For several years he skated at close to national top level, concurrently with political activism and his education in civil engineering and medicine. In 1972 and 1973 he reached top international level, achieving three world records during 13–14 January 1973 in Davos: 38.0 on the 500-m, 1:17.6 on the 1000-m, and point-sum 154.400 in the sprint combination (38.0 – 1:17.6 / 38.2 – 1:18.8). He was the fourth skater to achieve the 38.0 world record time, after Leo Linkovesi, Hasse Börjes and Erhard Keller. Efskind's world records lasted until respectively April 1974, when Aleksandr Safronov skated 1:17.23, and March 1975, when Yevgeny Kulikov skated 37.99 and Valery Muratov achieved 153.390. Efskind achieved a fourth place in the 1973 World Sprint Speed Skating Championships and a twelfth place on the 500 m at the 1972 Winter Olympics.

Efskind's The Soldier's Little Red Book was published in 1970 and caused public sphere as well as legal controversy, as it was concerned with political organisation within the armed forces. The author was charged with crimes against Article 140 of the Norwegian Penal Code (stirring up others to carry out criminal offences), which carries a maximum sentence of eight years of imprisonment. Efskind was however acquitted by the Supreme Court on the grounds of freedom of speech. Also the novel Trylleringen (The Lords of the Ring) of 1973 caused controversy, through its negative description of the speedskating milieu, on and off the circuit. During this time he was also student's representative of the first board of the recently established University of Tromsø.

Later books with fellow speedskater and medical doctor Asle T. Johansen have been of the "exotic group bicycling excursions" type, with emphasis also on the philosophy of travelling. These excursions have included bicycling around the Earth in 80 days; the route of Mao's Long March; on the roof of the world in Tibet; and via the Andes to the source of Amazon River. Efskind's 2007 project is to lead a group of cyclists through the Vietnam War, from Hanoi via My Lai to the killing fields of Cambodia. Efskind has also been working as a medical doctor during the El Salvador civil war and in Palestine, while trying to pursue his talent as a painter.

== World records ==
| Discipline | Time | Date | Location |
|---|---|---|---|
| 500 m | 0.38,0 | January 13, 1973 | (Switzerland) Davos |
| 1000 m | 1.17,6 | January 13, 1973 | (Switzerland) Davos |
| Sprint combination | 154.400 | January 14, 1973 | (Switzerland) Davos |

Source: SpeedSkatingStats.com
