= Speed skating at the 1976 Winter Olympics – Men's 500 metres =

Speed skating at the Olympics

Men's 500 metres at the XII Olympic Winter Games
- Pictogram for speed skating
- Venue: Eisschnellaufbahn
- Dates: 10 February 1976
- Competitors: 29 from 16 nations
- Winning time: 39.17 OR

Medalists
1st place, gold medalist(s)		Yevgeny Kulikov; Soviet Union
2nd place, silver medalist(s)		Valery Muratov; Soviet Union
3rd place, bronze medalist(s)		Dan Immerfall; United States

The men's 500 metres in speed skating at the 1976 Winter Olympics took place on 10 February, at the Eisschnellaufbahn.

== Records ==
Prior to this competition, the existing world and Olympic records were as follows:

World record	Yevgeny Kulikov (URS)	37.00	Alma-Ata, Kazakh SSR, Soviet Union	29 March 1975
Olympic record	Erhard Keller (FRG)	39.44	Sapporo, Japan	5 February 1972

The following new Olympic record was set.

Date	Athlete	Time	OR	WR
10 February	Yevgeny Kulikov (URS)	39.17	OR	

== Results ==
Rank	Pair	Lane	Athlete	Country	Time	Difference	Notes
1st place, gold medalist(s)	3	o	Yevgeny Kulikov	Soviet Union	39.17	–	OR
2nd place, silver medalist(s)	10	i	Valery Muratov	Soviet Union	39.25	+0.08	
3rd place, bronze medalist(s)	10	o	Dan Immerfall	United States	39.54	+0.37	
4	8	i	Mats Wallberg	Sweden	39.56	+0.39	
5	2	i	Peter Mueller	United States	39.57	+0.40	
6	7	o	Jan Bazen	Netherlands	39.78	+0.61	
6	4	o	Arnulf Sunde	Norway	39.78	+0.61	
8	13	i	Andrey Malikov	Soviet Union	39.85	+0.68	
9	13	o	Oloph Granath	Sweden	39.93	+0.76	
10	14	i	Jim Chapin	United States	40.09	+0.92	
11	11	i	Tom Overend	Canada	40.22	+1.05	
11	5	o	Masaki Suzuki	Japan	40.22	+1.05	
13	5	i	Johan Granath	Sweden	40.25	+1.08	
14	4	i	Gaétan Boucher	Canada	40.53	+1.36	
15	6	y	Pertti Niittylä	Finland	40.65	+1.48	
16	11	o	Norio Hirate	Japan	40.85	+1.68	
16	1	o	Archie Marshall	Great Britain	40.85	+1.68	
18	15	o	Mikio Oyama	Japan	40.90	+1.73	
19	8	o	Hans van Helden	Netherlands	40.91	+1.74	
19	1	i	Emmanuel Michon	France	40.91	+1.74	
21	12	o	Kay Arne Stenshjemmet	Norway	40.94	+1.77	
22	6	i	Lee Yeong-ha	South Korea	41.08	+1.91	
23	2	o	Bruno Toniolli	Italy	41.44	+2.27	
24	9	o	Harald Oehme	East Germany	41.54	+2.37	
25	12	o	Colin Coates	Australia	41.77	+2.60	
26	7	i	Berend Schabus	Austria	42.33	+3.16	
27	9	i	Heinz Steinberger	Austria	43.28	+4.11	
28	14	o	Jan Egil Storholt	Norway	1:18.00	+38.83	
-	3	o	Horst Freese	West Germany	DNF		
