= Leo Linkovesi =

Finnish speed skater

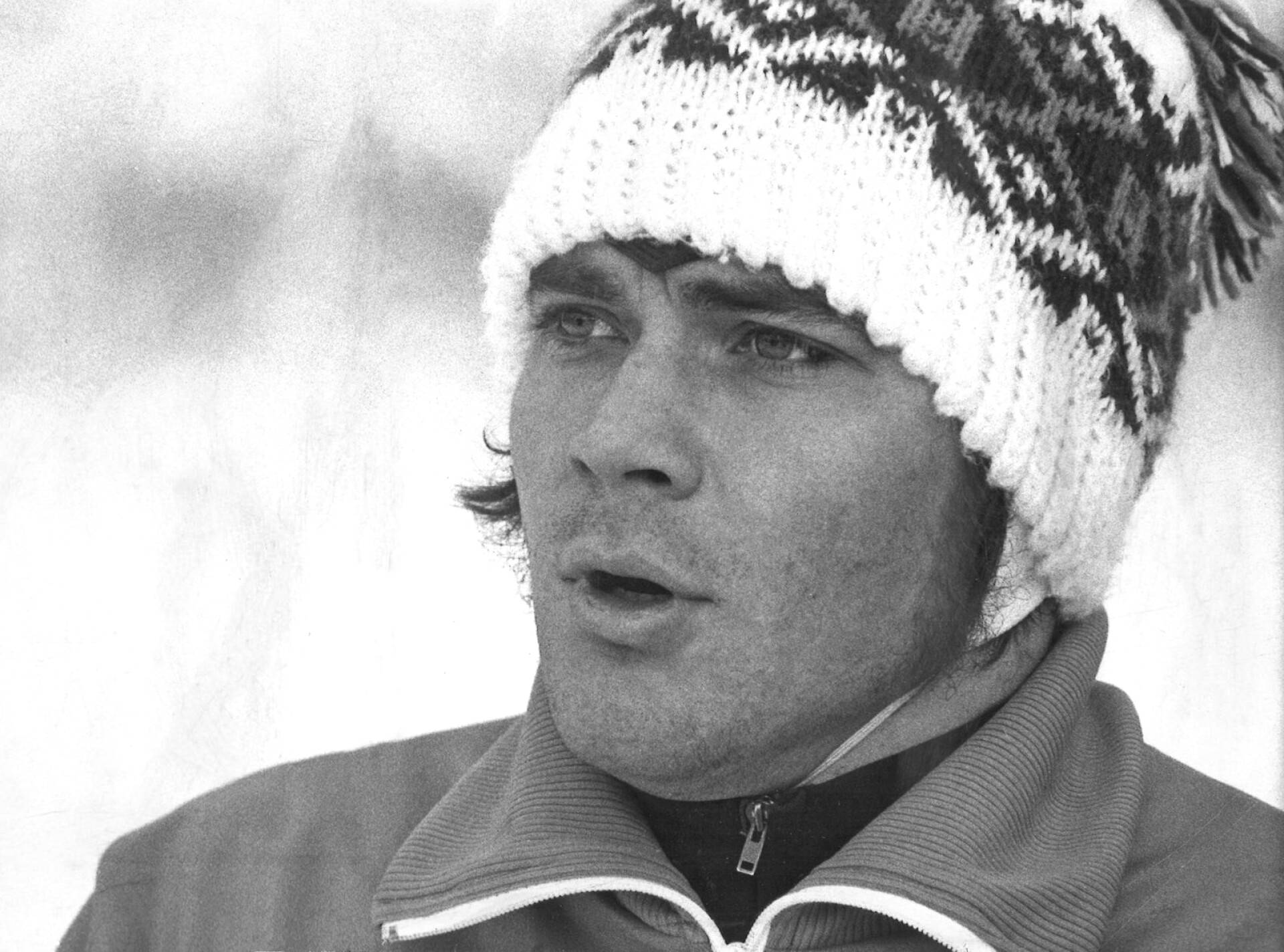

Personal information
- Full name: Leo Ensio Linkovesi
- Born: 8 April 1947 Helsinki, Finland
- Died: 7 November 2006 (aged 59) Kerava, Finland

Sport
- Sport: Speed skating
Medal record
Men's speed skating
Representing Finland
World Sprint Championships
Gold medal – first place	1972 Eskilstuna	Sprint

Leo Ensio Linkovesi (8 April 1947 – 7 November 2006) was a Finnish speedskater who specialised on the shorter distances, the 500 m and the 1000 m.

Linkovesi was born in Helsinki, Finland. He won the first ever official World Sprint Speed Skating Championships in 1972. In January of that year in Davos, he also set world records on the 500 m with 38.0 and in the sprint combination with 156.500 (38.7 – 1:19.3 / 38.0 – 1:20.3). Remarkably, three other skaters (Hasse Börjes, Erhard Keller, and Lasse Efskind) equalled the 38.0 world record time before it was lowered by Yevgeny Kulikov to 37.99 in 1975. At the 1972 Winter Olympics, Linkovesi placed sixth on the 500 m. Linkovesi died in Kerava, Finland at the age of 59.

== World records ==
Discipline	Time	Date	Location
500 m	38.0	8 January 1972	(Switzerland) Davos
Sprint combination	156.500	8 January 1972	(Switzerland) Davos
