= Alfred Næss =

Norwegian speed skater (1877–1955)

Karl Alfred Ingvald Næss
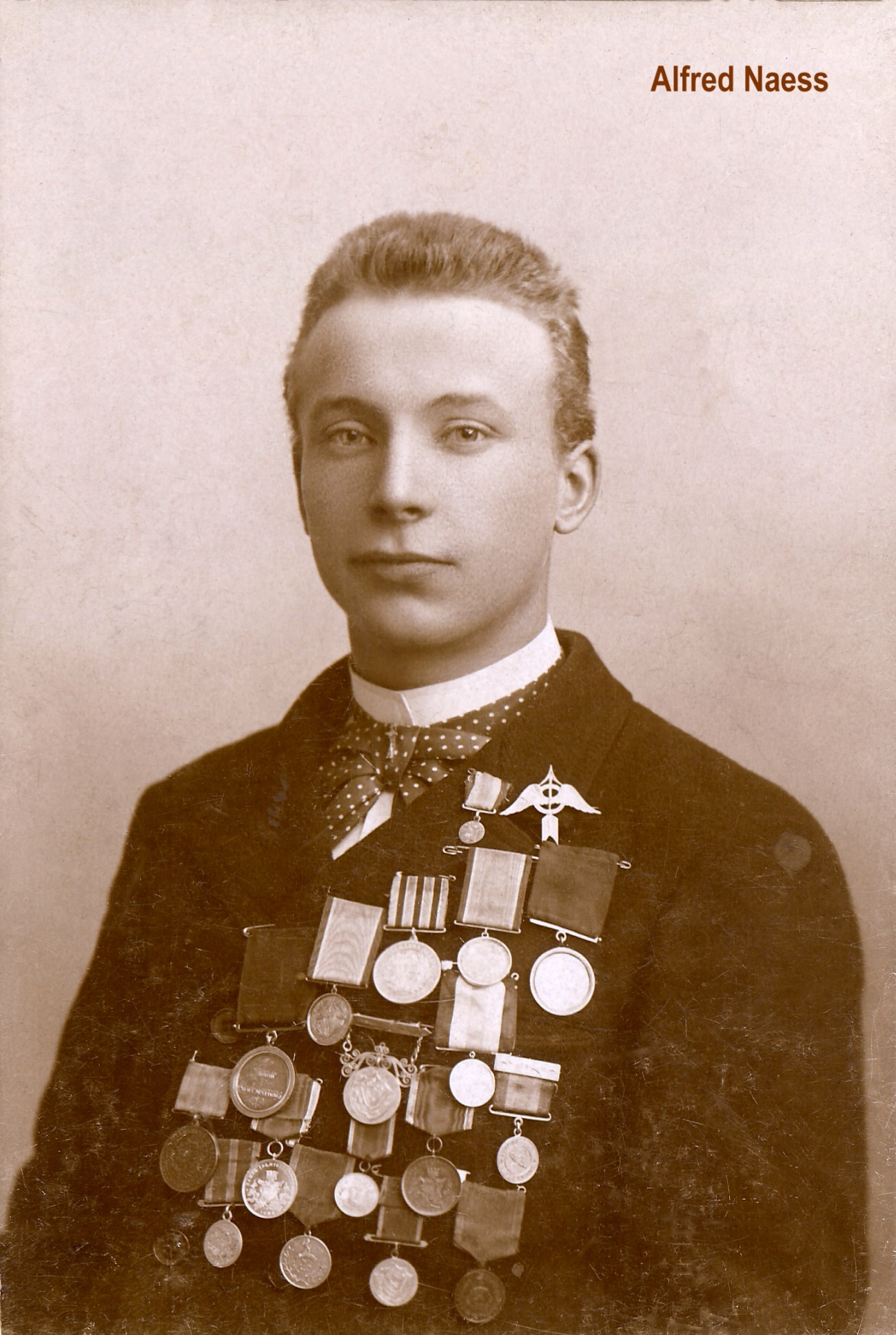
- Næss circa 1895–1900
- Born: 26 April 1877; Oslo, Norway
- Died: 6 July 1955 (aged 78); Strasshof an der Nordbahn, Austria
- Other names: Karl Alfred Ingvald Naess; Alfred Naess
- Occupation: Skater
- Known for: 500 meter speed skating record
- Spouses: Agnes Mjolstad; Marie (m. 1879–1956)
- Parent(s): Anne Jette Jensen (1847–?); Christian Andersen Næss (1848–?)
- Relatives: Carl Frederick Tandberg, nephew

Mr. Naess is beyond all question the finest fancy skater ever seen in this part of the country.

— St. John Daily Sun on 10 March 1897

Karl Alfred Ingvald Næss (26 April 1877 – 6 July 1955) was a Norwegian speed skater. He set the men's world record for 500 meters speed skating on 5 February 1893 at 49.4 seconds in Hamar, Norway. He then broke his own world record 21 days later on 26 February 1893 at 48.0 seconds, then lowered it to 47.0 seconds on 24 February 1894 at Hamar. He was the youngest European champion of all time, in 1895 he was 17 years and 276 days when he won the European Speed Skating Championships for Men.

== Biography ==
He was born in Norway on 26 April 1877 to Anne Jette Jensen (1847–?) of Kragerø or Skåtøy; and Kristian Andersen Næss (1848–?) of Grue. He was baptized as "Karl Alfred Ingvald Næss" on 27 May 1877 in the Garnison Menighet, in Oslo, Norway, but he always used the name "Alfred Næss". His father, Christian, was an army sergeant. Alfred had two siblings: Carl Albert Næss (1874–?); and Alvilde Marie Magdalene Næss (1875–1933) who married Thorvald Martin Tandberg (1874–1970). Næss grew up in Vika. On 6 February 1897 in Montreal, Quebec, Canada, he competed against Canadian Jack McCulloch in the 1,500-meter race, McCulloch and Næss tied, invoking a run-off. McCulloch won the run-off by two-fifths of a second. Also on 6 February 1897 Næss equaled the world record of 46.8 seconds set by Wilhelm Mauseth on 3 February 1895 in Trondheim, Norway, but on 7 February 1897 the record was broken by Peder Østlund with a time of 46.6. After Montreal he visited his sister in Portland, Maine, and gave a demonstration on 17 February 1897.

Næss won the Norwegian Allround Championships in Oslo in 1898, with gold medals in the 500 meter and the 1,500 meter, and a silver medal in the 5,000 meter. He set world records on three occasions in the 500 meter at Akersvika on Lake Mjøsa in Hamar, Norway. His best time was 47.0 in the European championships in 1894. Næss was in three European championships and three world championships, and he won the 500 meter race in two European championships and two world championships.

He went on the vaudeville circuit doing ice skate tricks on ice he would create in the theaters. In 1913 Næss returned to the United States. He married Agnes Mjolstad on 18 September 1919 in Manhattan, New York City and in 1920 he was living in a rented room in Manhattan.

He died on 6 July 1955 in Austria and was buried in Austria.

== Legacy ==
- Næss was the maternal uncle of Carl Frederick Tandberg, the bass musician.
- His partner in paired skating was Freda Maier-Westorgaard of Frankenberg (c. 1890 – 1976) who died in Strasshof an der Nordbahn, Austria, in 1976.

== Personal bests ==
Distance	Time	Date	Location	Tournament
500 meters	46.8 seconds	6 February 1897	(Canada) Montreal	World Allround Championships
1,500 meters	2 minutes, 35.0 seconds			
5,000 meters	9 minutes, 29.8 seconds			
10,000 meters	19 minutes, 17.0 seconds			

== Tournament results ==
Between 1894 and 1900 he competed in seven tournaments:

Tournament	Year	Date	Location	500 meter	1,500 meter	5,000 meter	10,000 meter	Highest	References
World Allround Championships	1894	10–11 February 1894	(Sweden) Stockholm	50.4 s (1/q), 51.4 s (3)	2 m 55.4 s (6/q)				
European Allround Championships	1894	24–25 February 1894	(Norway) Hamar	48.2 s (2/so), 47.0 s (1), 48.6 s (2/q)	2 m 36.6 s (5/q)				
European Allround Championships	1895	26–27 January 1895	(Hungary) Budapest	47.6 s (1), 47.8 s (1/q)	3 m 15.2 s (1), 2 m 49.8 s (2/q)	9 m 38.4 s (1)		Gold	
World Allround Championships	1897	5–6 February 1897	(Canada) Montreal	46.8 s (1)	2 m 42.4 s (1), 2 m 41.2 s (2/so)	9 m 01.5 s (7)			
European Allround Championships	1898	19–20 February 1898	(Finland) Helsinki	49.4 s (2)	2 m 39.0 s (2)	9 m 41.8 s (4)			
Norwegian Allround Championships	1898	25–26 February 1898	(Sweden) Oslo	47.4 s (1)	2 m 42.2 s (1)	9 m 55.0 s (2)		Gold	
World Allround Championships	1900	24–25 February 1900	(Sweden) Oslo	47.2 s (2)	2 m 42.0 s (2)	9 m 59.2 s (7)	20 m 49.2 s (4)	Second	

== Personal 500 meters progression ==
Between 1893 and 1894 he lowered his record in the 500 meter skate from 50.0 seconds to 46.8 seconds, setting three world records:

Date	Event	Seconds	Location	Comments
29 January 1893	500 meters	50.0	Trondheim	
5 February 1893	500 meters	49.4	Hamar	World record
19 February 1893	500 meters	48.0	Oslo	
26 February 1893	500 meters	48.0	Hamar	World record
24 February 1894	500 meters	47.0	Hamar	World record
16 January 1895	500 meters	47.0	Davos	
12 January 1896	500 meters	46.8	Hamar	Personal best
5 February 1897	500 meters	46.8	Montreal	Personal best

== See also ==
- List of speed skating records
- World record progression 500 m speed skating men

Records
Preceded by Einar Halvorsen	World record progression 500 m speed skating men 5 February 1893 – 26 February 1893	Succeeded by Einar Halvorsen
Preceded by Einar Halvorsen	World record progression 500 m speed skating men 26 February 1893 – 21 January 1894	Succeeded by Oskar Fredriksen
Preceded by Einar Halvorsen	World record progression 500 m speed skating men 24 February 1894 – 3 February 1895	Succeeded by Wilhelm Mauseth
