= Boris Gulyayev =

Russian speed skater

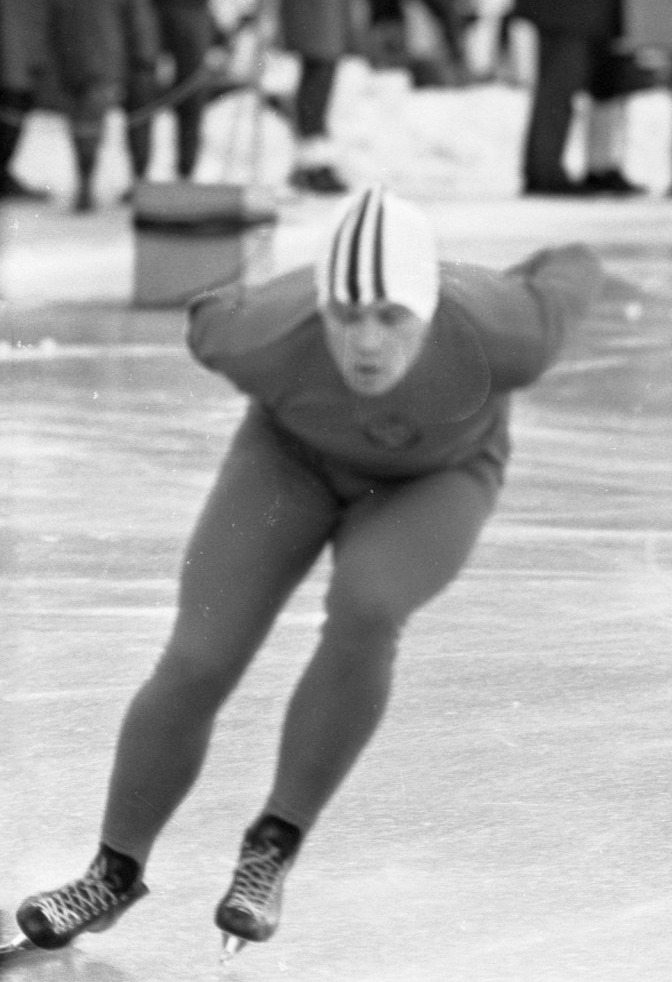
- Boris Gulyayev in 1968

Personal information
- Born: 22 April 1941 (age 85) Yekaterinburg, Soviet Union
- Height: 1.92 m (6 ft 4 in)
- Weight: 88 kg (194 lb)

Sport
- Sport: Speed skating
- Club: Dynamo Yekaterinburg

Boris Ivanovich Gulyayev (Russian: Борис Иванович Гуляев; 22 April 1941 - 23 October 2007) is a former Soviet speedskater. On 13 January 1970 he set a new world record in the 500 m at 0:39.03 at Medeo. He finished in 15th place in the same event at the 1964 Winter Olympics.

Gulyayev graduated from an institute of physical education in Yekaterinburg, and in 1982 defended a PhD at the Moscow Institute of Physical Education (GKTsOLIFK) on improving physical fitness of junior speedskaters. After that he returned to Yekaterinburg and worked as a lecturer and sports functionary.

Personal bests:

- 500 m – 39.03 (1970)
- 1500 m – 2:06.9 (1968)
- 5000 m – 9:02.2 (1968)

Records
Preceded by (Soviet Union) Valery Muratov	Men's 500 m World Record Holder; 13 January 1970 – 18 January 1970	Succeeded by (Sweden) Hasse Börjes
