= Pavel Pegov =

Russian speed skater

Personal information
- Full name: Pavel Georgievich Pegov
- Born: 29 November 1956 (age 69) Moscow, Russian SFSR, Soviet Union

Sport
- Sport: Speed skating
Medal record
Men's speed skating
Representing the Soviet Union
World Sprint Championships
Silver medal – second place	1983 Helsinki	Sprint

Pavel Georgievich Pegov (Russian: Павел Георгиевич Пегов, born 29 November 1956 in Moscow, Russian SFSR) is a former speed skater who specialised in the shorter 500 metres and 1000 metres distances. He studied at the East Siberian Technological Institute and trained with Nina Bobrova, and later at the Armed Forces sports society. He peaked in 1983 when he broke four world records.

Skating for the Soviet Union, Pavel Pegov finished second behind Japanese skater Akira Kuroiwa at the World Sprint Championships of 1983. In March that year, on the Medeo rink at Alma-Ata, he broke Yevgeny Kulikov's two-year-old world record on the 500 m. On the 25th of that month, he clocked 36.68, and a day later he sharpened the record to 36.57. That same weekend, he raced a perfect 1000 m – setting a legendary world record time of 1:12.58. He was the first speed skater to skate the 1000 m in less than 1 minute and 13 seconds and, although Igor Zhelezovski managed to equal this time six years later, Pegov's world record would stand undefeated for over ten years; Kevin Scott clocked 1:12.54 in Calgary 19 December 1993. His four Medeo races of 36.68, 1:12.58, 36.57, and 1:14.83 gave him another world record – the sprint combination samalogue point sum 146.955. This record lasted until Igor Zhelezovski very narrowly improved it to 146.945 in Heerenveen in February 1989.

Pegov never regained his eminence after 1983, finishing only 13th in the 1000 m at the 1984 Winter Olympics. A few weeks after the Olympics, he finished second, behind Sergey Khlebnikov, at the Soviet Sprint Championships. Pegov retired as an elite speed skater in 1985.

== Records ==
=== World records ===
Over the course of his career, Pegov held four world records:

Discipline	Time	Date	Location
500 m	36.68	25 March 1983	(Soviet Union) Medeo
1000 m	1:12.58	25 March 1983	(Soviet Union) Medeo
500 m	36.57	26 March 1983	(Soviet Union) Medeo
Sprint combination	146.955	26 March 1983	(Soviet Union) Medeo

Source: SpeedSkatingStats.com

=== Personal records ===
Event	Result	Date	Venue
500 m	36.57	26 March 1983	Medeo
1000 m	1:12.58	25 March 1983	Medeo
1500 m	1:54.62	27 December 1983	Medeo
3000 m	4:11.9	14 April 1977	Medeo
5000 m	7:10.29	29 March 1979	Medeo
10000 m	15:15.3	11 December 1976	Medeo
Big combination	169.046	29 December 1979	Medeo

Pegov has an Adelskalender score of 163.570 points.
