= Mauseth =

Mauseth is a surname. Notable people with the surname include:

- Gørild Mauseth (born 1972), Norwegian actress
- James D. Mauseth (born 1948), American botanist
- Wilhelm Mauseth, Norwegian speed skater
