= List of Burevestnik athletes =

This is the list of sportspeople from VSS Burevestnik. Most of them are World Champions or Olympic medalists.

== Artistic gymnastics ==
Athletes, who competed in artistic gymnastics:

- Nikolai Andrianov
- Viktor Chukarin
- Larisa Latynina
- Tamara Manina
- Boris Shakhlin
- Galina Shamrai

== Athletics ==
Athletes, who competed in athletics:

- Tatyana Anisimova
- Leonid Bartenev
- Irina Beglyakova
- Hennadiy Bleznitsov
- Valeriy Borzov
- Valery Brumel
- Galina Bystrova
- Taisia Chenchik
- Galina Chistyakova
- Oleg Fyodoseyev
- Rodion Gataullin
- Maria Golubnichaya
- Yelena Gorchakova
- Igor Kashkarov
- Tatyana Kazankina
- Mikhail Krivonosov
- Vasili Kuznetsov
- Leonid Lytvynenko
- Yevgeny Mironov
- Edvin Ozolin
- Elvīra Ozoliņa
- Natalya Pomoshchnikova-Voronova
- Vera Popkova
- Anatoli Samotsvetov
- Yuriy Sedykh
- Tatyana Shchelkanova
- Igor Ter-Ovanesyan
- Lyudmila Maslakova

== Basketball ==
Athletes, who competed in basketball:

- Sergei Kovalenko
- Kazys Petkevičius

== Boxing ==
Athletes, who competed in boxing:

- Gennadi Shatkov

== Chess ==
Athletes, who competed in chess:

- Nona Gaprindashvili
- Vasily Smyslov

== Cross-country skiing ==
Athletes, who competed in cross-country skiing:

- Alevtina Kolchina
- Lyubov Kozyreva
- Igor Voronchikin

== Fencing ==
Athletes, who competed in fencing:

- Mark Midler

== Handball ==
Athletes, who competed in handball:

- Aleksandr Anpilogov
- Valeri Gassy
- Vasily Ilyin

== Speed skating ==
Athletes who competed in speed skating:

- Tatyana Averina
- Yevgeny Kulikov
- Valery Muratov
- Natalya Petrusyova
- Tamara Rylova
- Lidia Skoblikova
- Lyudmila Titova

== Wrestling ==
Athletes, who competed in wrestling:

- Alexander Medved
