= World record progression 1500 m speed skating men =

The world record progression 1500 m speed skating men as recognised by the International Skating Union:

Nr.	Name	Country	Result	Date	Venue	
1	Jaap Eden	Netherlands	2:35.0	11 January 1893	Groningen	
2	Peder Østlund	Norway	2:32.6	25 February 1893	Hamar	
3	Peder Østlund	Norway	2:31.4	24 February 1894	Hamar	
4	Einar Halvorsen	Norway	2:29.6	24 February 1894	Hamar	
5	Peder Østlund	Norway	2:28.8	25 February 1894	Hamar	
6	Jaap Eden	Netherlands	2:25.4	23 February 1895	Hamar	
7	Peder Østlund	Norway	2:23.6	7 February 1898	Davos	
8	Peder Østlund	Norway	2:22.6	11 February 1900	Davos	
9	Oscar Mathisen	Norway	2:20.8	9 February 1908	Davos	
10	Oscar Mathisen	Norway	2:20.6	30 January 1910	Davos	
11	Oscar Mathisen	Norway	2:19.4	11 January 1914	Kristiania	
12	Oscar Mathisen	Norway	2:17.4	18 January 1914	Davos	
13	Michael Staksrud	Norway	2:14.9	31 January 1937	Davos	
14	Hans Engnestangen	Norway	2:13.8	29 January 1939	Davos	
15	Valentin Chaikin	Soviet Union	2:12.9	20 January 1952	Medeo	
16	Yevgeny Grishin	Soviet Union	2:09.8	10 January 1955	Medeo	
17	Yuri Mikhaylov	Soviet Union	2:09.1	20 January 1956	Davos	
18	Yevgeny Grishin	Soviet Union	2:08.6	30 January 1956	Misurina	OG 1956
19	Yuri Mikhaylov	Soviet Union	2:08.6	30 January 1956	Misurina	OG 1956
20	Juhani Järvinen	Finland	2:06.3	1 March 1959	Squaw Valley	
21	Ard Schenk	Netherlands	2:06.2	26 January 1966	Davos	
22	Ard Schenk	Netherlands	2:05.3	30 January 1966	Inzell	
23	Kees Verkerk	Netherlands	2:03.9	26 February 1967	Inzell	
24	Magne Thomassen	Norway	2:02.5	5 February 1968	Davos	
25	Kees Verkerk	Netherlands	2:02.0	9 February 1969	Davos	
26	Kees Verkerk	Netherlands	2:01.9	8 March 1970	Inzell	
27	Ard Schenk	Netherlands	1:58.7	16 January 1971	Davos	
28	Hans van Helden	Netherlands	1:55.61	13 March 1976	Inzell	
29	Jan Egil Storholt	Norway	1:55.18	20 March 1977	Medeo	
30	Eric Heiden	United States	1:54.79	19 January 1980	Davos	
31	Igor Zhelezovski	Soviet Union	1:54.26	26 March 1983	Medeo	
32	Oleg Bozhev	Soviet Union	1:53.26	24 March 1984	Medeo	
33	Nikolay Gulyayev	Soviet Union	1:52.70	15 February 1987	Heerenveen	Allround WCh 1987
34	Igor Zhelezovski	Soviet Union	1:52.50	5 December 1987	Calgary	
35	André Hoffmann	East Germany	1:52.06	20 February 1988	Calgary	OG 1988
36	Rintje Ritsma	Netherlands	1:51.60	8 January 1994	Hamar	Allround ECh 1994
37	Johann Olav Koss	Norway	1:51.29	16 February 1994	Hamar	OG 1994
38	Hiroyuki Noake	Japan	1:50.61	2 March 1996	Calgary	
39	K. C. Boutiette	United States	1:50.09	15 March 1997	Calgary	
40	Neal Marshall	Canada	1:50.05	16 March 1997	Calgary	
41	Ids Postma	Netherlands	1:49.81	29 November 1997	Berlin	
42	Kevin Overland	Canada	1:49.07	29 November 1997	Calgary	
43	Rintje Ritsma	Netherlands	1:48.88	20 December 1997	Heerenveen	
44	Ådne Søndrål	Norway	1:47.87	12 February 1998	Nagano	OG 1998
45	Ådne Søndrål	Norway	1:46.43	28 March 1998	Calgary	
46	Jakko Jan Leeuwangh	Netherlands	1:45.56	29 January 2000	Calgary	
47	Lee Kyou-hyuk	South Korea	1:45.20	16 March 2001	Calgary	
48	Derek Parra	United States	1:43.95	19 February 2002	Salt Lake City	OG 2002
49	Shani Davis	United States	1:43.33	9 January 2005	Salt Lake City	
50	Chad Hedrick	United States	1:42.78	18 November 2005	Salt Lake City	
51	Shani Davis	United States	1:42.68	19 March 2006	Calgary	
52	Shani Davis	United States	1:42.32	4 March 2007	Calgary	
53	Erben Wennemars	Netherlands	1:42.32	9 November 2007	Salt Lake City	
54	Denny Morrison	Canada	1:42.01	14 March 2008	Calgary	
55	Shani Davis	United States	1:41.80	6 March 2009	Salt Lake City	
56	Shani Davis	United States	1:41.04	11 December 2009	Salt Lake City	
57	Denis Yuskov	Russia	1:41.02	9 December 2017	Salt Lake City	
58	Kjeld Nuis	Netherlands	1:40.17	10 March 2019	Salt Lake City	
