= World record progression 500 m speed skating men =

The world record progression 500 m speed skating men as recognised by the International Skating Union:

Name	Result	Date	Venue	Meeting
(Sweden) Oscar Grundén	50.8	28 February 1891	Stockholm	
(Norway) Einar Halvorsen	50.2	28 February 1892	Hamar	
(Norway) Alfred Næss	49.4	5 February 1893	Hamar	
(Norway) Einar Halvorsen	48.0	26 February 1893	Hamar	
(Norway) Alfred Næss	48.0	26 February 1893	Hamar	
(Norway) Oskar Fredriksen	47.8	21 January 1894	Kristiania	
(Norway) Einar Halvorsen	47.0	24 February 1894	Hamar	European Championships
(Norway) Alfred Næss	47.0	24 February 1894	Hamar	European Championships
(Norway) Wilhelm Mauseth	46.8	3 February 1895	Trondhjem	
(Norway) Peder Østlund	46.6	7 February 1897	Trondhjem	
(Norway) Peder Østlund	45.2	10 February 1900	Davos	
(Norway) Rudolf Gundersen	44.8	27 January 1906	Davos	European Championships
(Finland) Johan Vikander	44.4	9 February 1908	Davos	
(Norway) Sigurd Mathisen	44.4	9 February 1908	Davos	
(Norway) Oscar Mathisen	44.2	17 February 1912	Kristiania	World Allround Championships
(Norway) Oscar Mathisen	44.0	16 March 1913	Hamar	
(Norway) Oscar Mathisen	43.7	10 January 1914	Kristiania	
(Norway) Oscar Mathisen	43.4	17 January 1914	Davos	
(Norway) Roald Larsen	43.1	4 February 1928	Davos	World Allround Championships
(Finland) Clas Thunberg	42.8	19 January 1929	Davos	European Championships
(Finland) Clas Thunberg	42.6	13 January 1931	St. Moritz	
(Norway) Hans Engnestangen	42.5	21 January 1933	Davos	
(United States) Allan Potts	42.4	18 January 1936	Oslo	
(Norway) Hans Engnestangen	42.3	30 January 1937	Davos	European Championships
(Norway) Hans Engnestangen	41.8	5 February 1938	Davos	World Allround Championships
(Soviet Union) Yuri Sergeev	41.7	6 January 1952	Medeo	
(Soviet Union) Yuri Sergeev	41.2	19 January 1952	Medeo	
(Soviet Union) Yuri Sergeev	40.9	25 January 1953	Medeo	
(Soviet Union) Yuri Sergeev	40.8	19 January 1955	Medeo	
(Soviet Union) Yevgeny Grishin	40.2	22 January 1956	Misurina	
(Soviet Union) Yevgeny Grishin	40.2	28 January 1956	Misurina	Winter Olympics
(Soviet Union) Yevgeny Grishin	40.2	24 February 1960	Squaw Valley	Winter Olympics
(Soviet Union) Yevgeny Grishin	39.6	27 January 1963	Medeo	
(Soviet Union) Yevgeny Grishin	39.5	28 January 1963	Medeo	
(West Germany) Erhard Keller	39.2	28 January 1968	Inzell	
(Japan) Keiichi Suzuki	39.2	1 March 1969	Inzell	
(Soviet Union) Valery Muratov	39.09	9 January 1970	Medeo	
(Soviet Union) Boris Gulyayev	39.03	13 January 1970	Medeo	
(Sweden) Hasse Börjes	38.9 (Note: The world record of 38.9 seconds was set by Hasse Börjes on 18 January 1970 had been manually timed and thus with a precision of only one tenth of a second. In those days, it was not yet required that a performance be automatically timed (with a precision of one hundredth of a second) in order for it to be recognised as a world record. When Valery Muratov skated 38.99 six days later, it was automatically timed and since – when disregarding the hundredths of a second – the result was the same as the time set by Börjes, it was recognised as a world record. Muratov's world record stood for only one day, because Börjes skated 38.87 the following day. Muratov skated a new world record of 38.73 four days after that.)	18 January 1970	Davos	
(Soviet Union) Valery Muratov	38.99	24 January 1970	Medeo	
(Sweden) Hasse Börjes	38.87	25 January 1970	Medeo	
(Soviet Union) Valery Muratov	38.73	29 January 1970	Medeo	
(Japan) Keiichi Suzuki	38.71	7 March 1970	Inzell	
(Sweden) Hasse Börjes	38.46	8 March 1970	Inzell	
(West Germany) Erhard Keller	38.42	14 March 1971	Inzell	
(West Germany) Erhard Keller	38.3	2 January 1972	Inzell	
(Finland) Leo Linkovesi	38.0	8 January 1972	Davos	
(West Germany) Erhard Keller	38.0	4 March 1972	Inzell	
(Sweden) Hasse Börjes	38.0	4 March 1972	Inzell	
(Norway) Lasse Efskind	38.0	13 January 1973	Davos	
(Soviet Union) Yevgeny Kulikov	37.99	15 March 1975	Medeo	
(Soviet Union) Yevgeny Kulikov	37.97	16 March 1975	Medeo	
(Soviet Union) Valery Muratov	37.85	18 March 1975	Medeo	
(Soviet Union) Yevgeny Kulikov	37.20	28 March 1975	Medeo	
(Soviet Union) Yevgeny Kulikov	37.00	29 March 1975	Medeo	
(Soviet Union) Yevgeny Kulikov	36.91	28 March 1981	Medeo	
(Soviet Union) Pavel Pegov	36.68	25 March 1983	Medeo	
(Soviet Union) Pavel Pegov	36.57	26 March 1983	Medeo	
(United States) Nick Thometz	36.55	19 March 1987	Heerenveen	
(East Germany) Uwe-Jens Mey	36.45	14 February 1988	Calgary	Winter Olympics
(Germany) Uwe-Jens Mey	36.43	19 January 1992	Davos	
(United States) Dan Jansen	36.41	25 January 1992	Davos	
(United States) Dan Jansen	36.41	19 March 1993	Calgary	
(United States) Dan Jansen	36.02	20 March 1993	Calgary	
(United States) Dan Jansen	35.92	4 December 1993	Hamar	
(United States) Dan Jansen	35.76	30 January 1994	Calgary	World Sprint Championships
(Japan) Hiroyasu Shimizu	35.39	2 March 1996	Calgary	
(Japan) Hiroyasu Shimizu	35.36	28 March 1998	Calgary	
(Japan) Hiroyasu Shimizu	34.82	28 March 1998	Calgary	
(Canada) Jeremy Wotherspoon	34.76	20 February 1999	Calgary	World Sprint Championships
(Canada) Jeremy Wotherspoon	34.63	29 January 2000	Calgary	
(Japan) Hiroyasu Shimizu	34.32	10 March 2001	Salt Lake City	World Single Distance Championships
(Japan) Joji Kato	34.30	19 November 2005	Salt Lake City	
(South Korea) Lee Kang-seok	34.25	9 March 2007	Salt Lake City	World Single Distance Championships
(Canada) Jeremy Wotherspoon	34.03	9 November 2007	Salt Lake City	
(Russia) Pavel Kulizhnikov	34.00	15 November 2015	Calgary	World Cup
(Russia) Pavel Kulizhnikov	33.98	20 November 2015	Salt Lake City	World Cup
(Russia) Pavel Kulizhnikov	33.61	9 March 2019	Salt Lake City	World Cup Final
