= Dan Jansen =

American speed skater (born 1965)

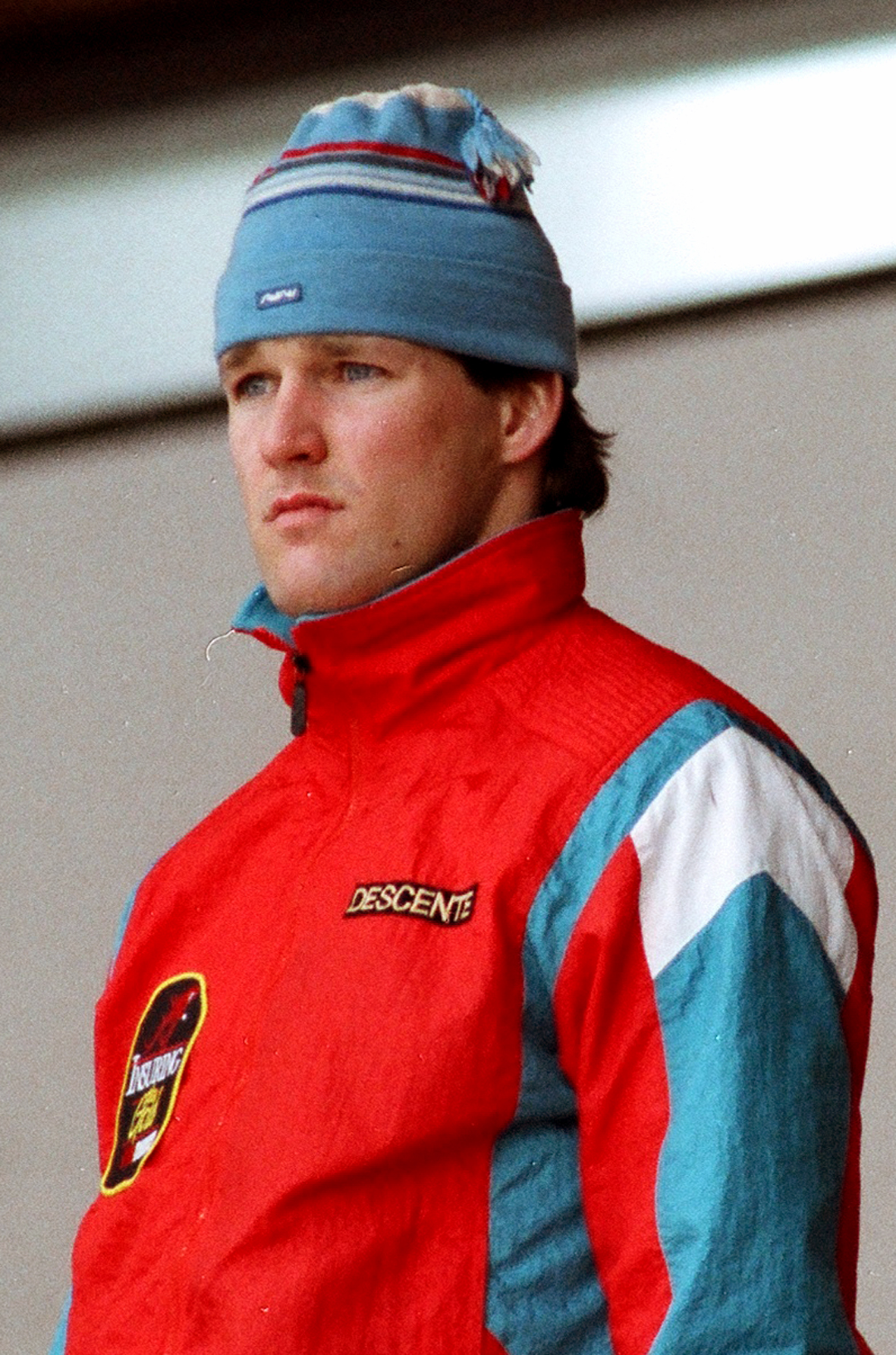

Personal information
- Full name: Daniel Erwin Jansen
- Born: June 17, 1965 (age 61) West Allis, Wisconsin, U.S.
- Height: 1.88 m (6 ft 2 in)
- Weight: 83 kg (183 lb)

Sport
- Country: United States
- Sport: Speed skating
- Turned pro: 1982
- Retired: 1994

Achievements and titles
- Personal bests: 500 m: 35.76 (1994); 1000 m: 1:12.43 (1994); 1500 m: 1:55.62 (1993); 3000 m: 4:25.63 (1983); 5000 m: 7:50.22 (1982)
Medal record
Men's speed skating
Representing the United States
Olympic Games
| Gold medal – first place | 1994 Lillehammer | 1,000 m |
World Sprint Championships
| Gold medal – first place | 1988 West Allis | Sprint |
| Gold medal – first place | 1994 Calgary | Sprint |
| Silver medal – second place | 1986 Karuizawa | Sprint |
| Silver medal – second place | 1992 Oslo | Sprint |
| Bronze medal – third place | 1985 Heerenveen | Sprint |

Daniel Erwin Jansen (born June 17, 1965) is a retired American speed skater. A multiple world champion in sprint and perennial favorite at the Winter Olympics, he broke a ten-year Olympic jinx when he won a gold medal in his final race, which was the 1,000 meters in the 1994 Winter Games.

== Early career ==
Dan Jansen is the youngest of nine children born to Geraldine (née Grajek) Jansen (1928–2017) a nurse, and Harry Jansen (1928–2015), who retired from the police department as a lieutenant detective. His family is Roman Catholic. He has three sisters who are nurses. Two of his four brothers are police officers and one is a firefighter. He graduated from West Allis Central High School. Inspired by his sister Jane (1960–1988), he took up speed skating while growing up. He set a junior world record in the 500-meter race at age 16, and finished 16th in the 1,000 meters and fourth in the 500 meters at the 1984 Winter Olympics.

== Competitive history ==
In 1988, Jansen became the World Sprint Champion before heading to the 1988 Winter Olympics, where he was a favorite for the 500- and 1,000-meter races. In the early hours of February 14, the day of the 500-meter event, Jansen was informed that his 27-year-old sister, Mrs. Jane Marie Beres, was dying of leukemia. Jansen spoke to her on the phone but was unable to receive a response. A few hours later, Jansen was notified of his sister's death.

Jansen went on to compete in the 500-meter race that afternoon but fell in the first turn. Four days later in the 1,000-meter event, he began with record-breaking speed but fell again, just past the 800-meter mark. He left the 1988 Olympics with no medals but became the recipient of the U.S. Olympic Spirit Award for his valiant efforts. In the 1992 Winter Olympics in Albertville, he finished fourth in the 500 meters and 26th in the 1,000 meters, and left the games with no medals. In 1993, Jansen set a world record in the 500-meter event and was cast as a favorite to win the gold medal in the event at the 1994 Winter Olympics in Lillehammer.

Between the 1992 and 1994 Olympics, Jansen was the only skater to break 36 seconds in the 500 meters, doing so four times. In 1994, Jansen won his second World Sprint Championship title, and he arrived at the 1994 Winter Olympics for one final attempt at an Olympic medal.

In the 500-meter event, he finished eighth. In preparation for the 1,000-meter event, he was coached by Peter Mueller, who won the same event in the 1976 Winter Olympics. Jansen defied expectations and finished first, winning his first and only Olympic medal of his career, while setting a new world record in the process. He received the 1994 James E. Sullivan Award and was chosen by his fellow Olympians to bear the U.S. flag at the closing ceremony of the 1994 Winter Olympics. He was elected to the Wisconsin Athletic Hall of Fame in 1995.

== Personal life ==
Jansen has two daughters, Jane (named after his sister) and Olivia, from his marriage to first wife Robin Wicker. After separating from his wife, he was in a relationship with Christine Rosa. His second wife, Karen Palacios, is a top golf teaching professional. He was inducted into the United States Olympic Hall of Fame in 2004. Today, Dan Jansen is a speed skating commentator for NBC, and, from 2005 to 2007, he was the skating coach for the Chicago Blackhawks of the National Hockey League.

In memory of his sister Jane, he established the Dan Jansen Foundation with the purpose of fighting leukemia. He is an honorary board member of the Multiple Myeloma Research Foundation.

== Records ==
=== World records ===
Over the course of his career, Jansen set eight world records in speed skating:

| Event | Time | Date | Venue |
|---|---|---|---|
| 500 m | 36.41 | January 25, 1992 | Davos |
| 500 m | 36.41 | March 19, 1993 | Calgary |
| 500 m | 36.02 | March 20, 1993 | Calgary |
| Sprint combination | 145.580 | March 20, 1993 | Calgary |
| 500 m | 35.92 | December 4, 1993 | Hamar |
| 500 m | 35.76 | January 30, 1994 | Calgary |
| Sprint combination | 144.815 | January 30, 1994 | Calgary |
| 1000 m | 1:12.43 | February 18, 1994 | Hamar |

Source: SpeedSkatingStats.com

=== Personal records ===
| Distance | Result | Date | Location |
|---|---|---|---|
| 500 m | 35.76 | January 30, 1994 | Calgary |
| 1000 m | 1:12.43 | February 18, 1994 | Hamar |
| 1500 m | 1:55.62 | March 14, 1993 | Heerenveen |
| 3000 m | 4:25.63 | March 5, 1983 | Sarajevo |
| 5000 m | 7:50.22 | February 7, 1982 | Inzell |

Source: SpeedskatingResults.com
