= World record progression 1000 m speed skating men =

The world record progression 1000 m speed skating men as recognised by the International Skating Union:

Name	Result	Date	Venue
(Norway) Peder Østlund	1:38.0	16 January 1899	Davos
(Norway) Peder Østlund	1:34.0	10 February 1900	Davos
(Norway) Oscar Mathisen	1:31.8	30 January 1909	Davos
(Finland) Clas Thunberg	1:28.4	11 January 1930	Davos
(Soviet Union) Yevgeny Grishin	1:22.8	12 January 1955	Medeo
(Netherlands) Ard Schenk	1:20.6	28 February 1967	Inzell
(Netherlands) Ard Schenk	1:20.6	5 February 1968	Davos
(Norway) Ivar Eriksen	1:20.5	9 March 1968	Inzell
(Norway) Ivar Eriksen	1:20.3	8 February 1969	Inzell
(Norway) Ivar Eriksen	1:19.5	1 March 1969	Inzell
(Soviet Union) Valery Muratov	1:19.2	24 January 1970	Medeo
(Norway) Ivar Eriksen	1:19.2	15 January 1971	Davos
(Netherlands) Ard Schenk	1:18.8	20 February 1971	Inzell
(West Germany) Erhard Keller	1:18.5	4 March 1972	Inzell
(Norway) Lasse Efskind	1:17.6	13 January 1973	Davos
(Soviet Union) Aleksandr Safronov	1:17.23	11 April 1974	Medeo
(Soviet Union) Valery Muratov	1:16.92	17 March 1975	Medeo
(Soviet Union) Yevgeny Kulikov	1:15.70	20 March 1976	Medeo
(Soviet Union) Yevgeny Kulikov	1:15.33	19 March 1977	Medeo
(United States) Eric Heiden	1:14.99	12 March 1978	Savalen
(United States) Eric Heiden	1:14.99	17 February 1979	Inzell
(United States) Eric Heiden	1:13.60	13 January 1980	Davos
(Canada) Gaétan Boucher	1:13.39	31 January 1981	Davos
(Soviet Union) Pavel Pegov	1:12.58	25 March 1983	Medeo
(Soviet Union) Igor Zhelezovski	1:12.58	25 February 1989	Heerenveen
(Canada) Kevin Scott	1:12.54	17 December 1993	Calgary
(United States) Dan Jansen	1:12.43	18 February 1994	Hamar
(Japan) Yasunori Miyabe	1:12.37	26 March 1994	Calgary
(Canada) Sylvain Bouchard	1:12.27	22 December 1995	Calgary
(Canada) Kevin Overland	1:12.19	23 December 1995	Calgary
(Japan) Manabu Horii	1:11.67	1 March 1996	Calgary
(Netherlands) Jan Bos	1:10.63	22 November 1997	Calgary
(South Korea) Lee Kyou-hyuk	1:10.42	23 November 1997	Calgary
(Canada) Jeremy Wotherspoon	1:10.16	29 December 1997	Calgary
(Canada) Sylvain Bouchard	1:09.60	29 March 1998	Calgary
(Canada) Jeremy Wotherspoon	1:09.09	15 January 1999	Calgary
(Canada) Jeremy Wotherspoon	1:08.66	20 February 1999	Calgary
(Netherlands) Jan Bos	1:08.55	21 February 1999	Calgary
(Canada) Jeremy Wotherspoon	1:08.49	12 January 2000	Calgary
(Canada) Jeremy Wotherspoon	1:08.35	18 March 2000	Calgary
(Canada) Michael Ireland	1:08.34	3 March 2001	Calgary
(Canada) Jeremy Wotherspoon	1:08.28	11 March 2001	Salt Lake City
(Canada) Jeremy Wotherspoon	1:07.72	1 December 2001	Salt Lake City
(Netherlands) Gerard van Velde	1:07.18	16 February 2002	Salt Lake City
(United States) Shani Davis	1:07.03	20 November 2005	Salt Lake City
(Finland) Pekka Koskela	1:07.00	10 November 2007	Salt Lake City
(United States) Trevor Marsicano	1:06.88	7 March 2009	Salt Lake City
(United States) Shani Davis	1:06.42	7 March 2009	Salt Lake City
(Netherlands) Kjeld Nuis	1:06.18	9 March 2019	Salt Lake City
(Russia) Pavel Kulizhnikov	1:05.69	15 February 2020	Salt Lake City
(United States) Jordan Stolz	1:05.37	26 January 2024	Salt Lake City
