= Igor Zhelezovski =

Belarusian speed skater (1963–2021)

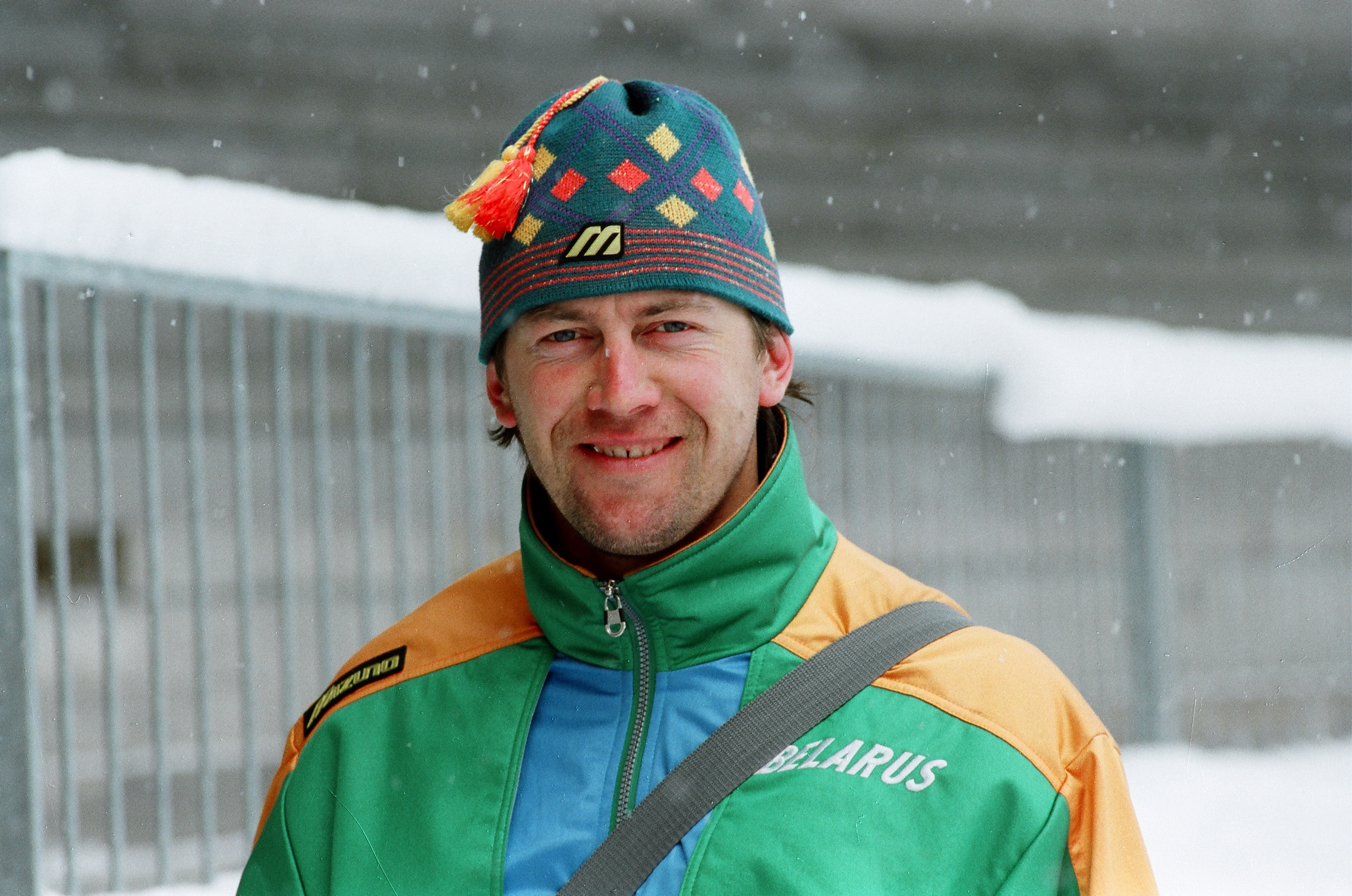
- Zhelezovski in 1994

Personal information
- Nickname: Bear from Minsk
- Nationality: Belarusian
- Born: Ihar Mikalaevich Zhalyazouski; 1 June 1963 Orsha, Byelorussian SSR, Soviet Union
- Died: 12 June 2021 (aged 58) Minsk, Belarus
- Height: 1.86 m (6 ft 1 in)
- Weight: 95 kg (209 lb)

Sport
- Country: Soviet Union; CIS; Belarus
- Sport: Speed skating
- Club: SK VS Minsk
- Turned pro: 1982
- Retired: 1994

Achievements and titles
- Personal best(s): 500 m: 36.49 (1988); 1000 m: 1:12.58 (1989); 1500 m: 1:52.50 (1987); 3000 m: 4:12.85 (1988); 5000 m: 7:09.84 (1983); 10 000 m: 15:40.82 (1983)
Medal record
Men's speed skating
Olympic Games
Representing the Soviet Union
Bronze medal – third place	1988 Calgary	1000 m
Representing Belarus
Silver medal – second place	1994 Lillehammer	1000 m
World Sprint Championships
Representing the Soviet Union
Gold medal – first place	1985 Heerenveen	Sprint
Gold medal – first place	1986 Karuizawa	Sprint
Gold medal – first place	1989 Heerenveen	Sprint
Bronze medal – third place	1990 Tromsø	Sprint
Gold medal – first place	1991 Inzell	Sprint
Representing CIS
Gold medal – first place	1992 Oslo	Sprint
Representing Belarus
Gold medal – first place	1993 Ikaho	Sprint

Igor Nikolayevich Zhelezovski or Ihar Mikalaevich Zhalyazouski or Ihar Mikałajevič Žalazoŭski (Belarusian: Ігар Мікалаевіч Жалязоўскі; Russian: Игорь Николаевич Железовский; 1 June 1963 – 12 June 2021) was a Soviet and Belarusian speed skater.

== Biography ==
His imposing physical appearance resulted in the nicknames "Igor the Terrible" and "The bear from Minsk". Originally competing for the Soviet Union, then for the Commonwealth of Independent States, and finally for Belarus, he became World Sprint Champion a record six times. In Soviet times, he trained at Armed Forces sports society in Minsk.

Zhelezovski won silver at the World Junior Allround Championships in 1982. Specialising in the sprint, he became World Sprint Champion in 1985, 1986, 1989, 1991, 1992, and 1993. He finished eighth in the 1987 edition, and decided to skip the 1988 edition in favour of preparing for the Winter Olympics in Calgary that same year. These, however, turned out to be a disappointment for him, finishing sixth in the 500 m, only third in 1000 m, and fourth in the 1500 m. In the remaining two World Sprint Championships he participated in, in 1990 and 1994, he finished third and sixth, respectively.

In his final two seasons, which followed the dissolution of the Soviet Union, Zhelezovski represented Belarus. It was during this time that he achieved a career highlight of winning the silver medal in the 1000 m event at the 1994 Winter Olympics in Lillehammer, Norway. At the opening ceremony of the 1994 Winter Olympics, he was the Belarusian flag bearer.

After ending his skating career in 1994, Zhalyazouski became president of the skating union of Belarus, a position which he held for several years.

Zhelezovski died on 12 June 2021, at the age of 57 due to complications from COVID-19.

== Medals ==
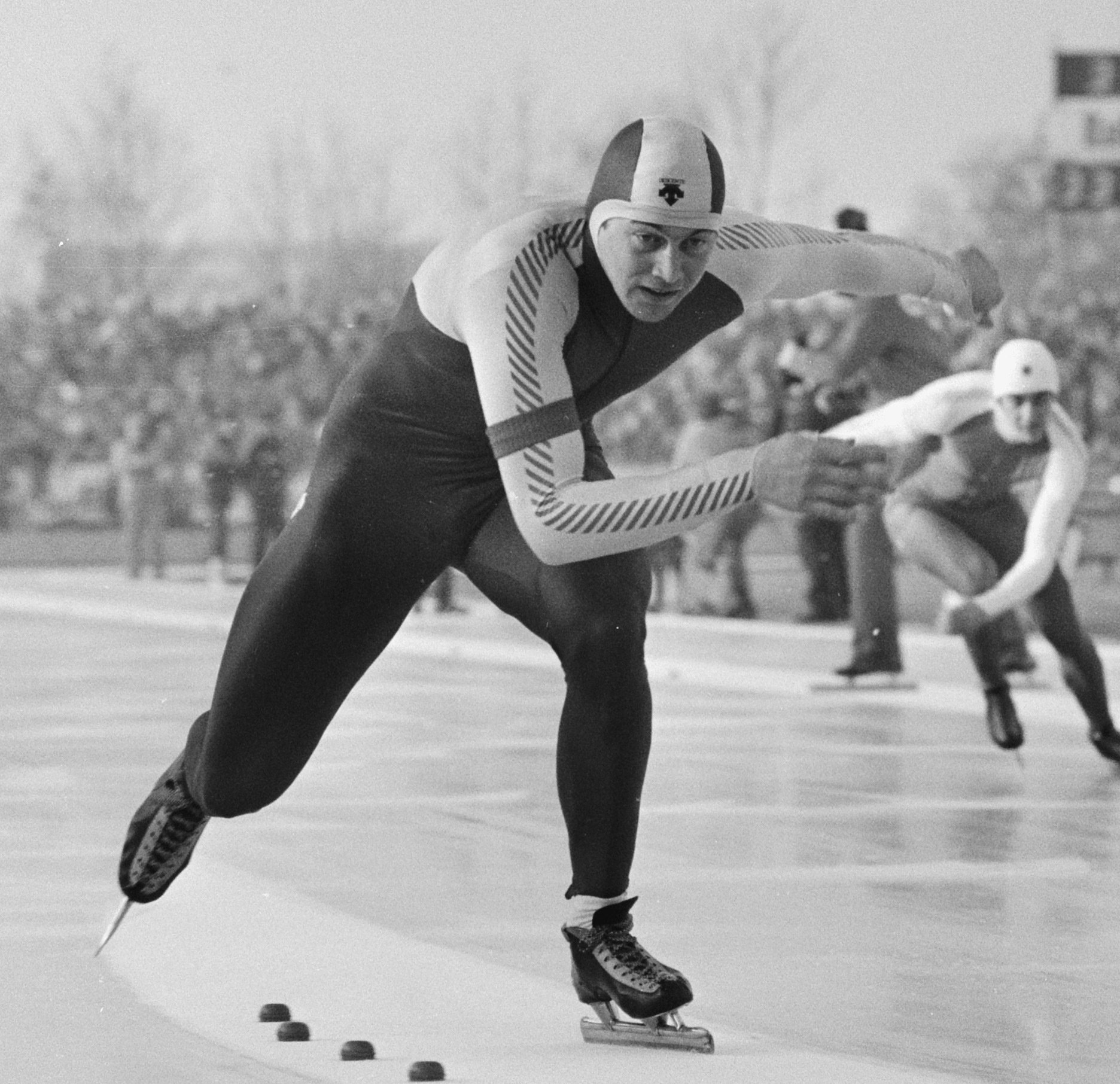
Igor Zhelezovski in 1985

An overview of medals won by Zhelezovski at important championships he participated in, listing the years in which he won each:

Championships	Gold medal	Silver medal	Bronze medal
Winter Olympics	–	1994 (1000 m)	1988 (1000 m)
World Sprint	1985; 1986; 1989; 1991; 1992; 1993	–	1990
World Cup	1991 (1000 m); 1992 (1000 m); 1993 (1000 m)	–	1993 (500 m); 1994 (1000 m)
World Junior Allround	–	1982	–
Soviet Allround	–	–	–
Soviet Sprint	1985; 1986; 1989; 1990; 1991	–	1984

== Records ==
=== World records ===
Over the course of his career, Zhelezovski skated four world records, one of which equalled Pavel Pegov's six-year-old world record on the 1000 m:

Event	Time	Date	Venue
1500 m	1:54.26	26 March 1983	(Soviet Union) Alma-Ata
1500 m	1:52.50	5 December 1987	(Canada) Calgary
1000 m	1:12.58	25 February 1989	(Netherlands) Heerenveen
Sprint combination	145.945	26 February 1989	(Netherlands) Heerenveen

Source: SpeedSkatingStats.com

=== Personal records ===
To put these personal records in perspective, the WR column lists the official world records on the dates that Zhelezovski skated his personal records.

Event	Result	Date	Venue	WR
500 m	36.49	21 December 1985	Alma-Ata	36.57
1000 m	1:12.58	25 February 1989	Heerenveen	1:12.58
1500 m	1:52.50	5 December 1987	Calgary	1:52.70
3000 m	4:12.85	9 January 1988	Davos	3:59.27
5000 m	7:09.84	25 March 1983	Alma-Ata	6:54.66
10000 m	15:40.82	26 March 1983	Alma-Ata	14:23.59
Big combination	166.201	26 March 1983	Alma-Ata	162.973

Source: SpeedskatingResults.com

Note that Zhelezovski's personal record on the 500 m was not recognised as a world record by the International Skating Union (ISU).

Zhelezovski has an Adelskalender score of 164.015 points.
