= Valentin Chaikin =

Russian speed skater (1925–2018)

Valentin Chaikin (Russian: Валентин Афанасьевич Чайкин) (26 August 1925 – 13 September 2018) was a Russian speed skater.

He set a world record in 1500 m in Medeo in 1952, with the time 2:12.9, beating Hans Engnestangen's previous record from 1939.

== World record ==
Discipline	Time	Date	Location
1500 m	2.12,9	20 January 1952	(Soviet Union) Medeo

Source: SpeedSkatingStats.com

Records
Preceded by (Norway) Hans Engnestangen	Men's 1500 m world record holder 20 January 1952 – 10 January 1955	Succeeded by (Soviet Union) Yevgeny Grishin
