= Ivar Eriksen =

Norwegian speed skater

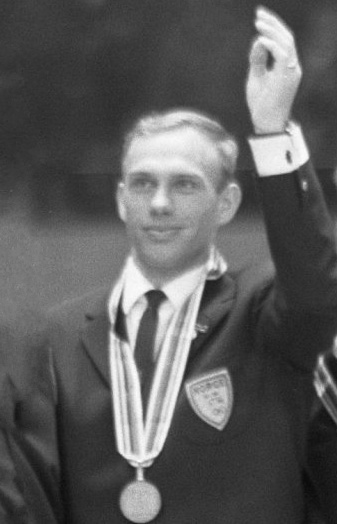
- Ivar Eriksen in 1968

Personal information
- Born: 7 March 1942 (age 84) Hamar, Norway
- Height: 1.78 m (5 ft 10 in)
- Weight: 74 kg (163 lb)

Sport
- Sport: Speed skating
- Club: Aktiv SK, Oslo
Medal record
Representing Norway
Olympic Games
Men's speed skating
Silver medal – second place	1968 Grenoble	1500 m

Alf Ivar Eriksen (born 7 March 1942) is a former speed skater from Norway.

He won a silver medal in 1500 m., shared with Ard Schenk, at the 1968 Winter Olympics in Grenoble; at the 1964 Winter Olympics in Innsbruck he came on sixth place on the same distance. Over the course of his career, Eriksen skated five world records and was the first to skate 1,000 m below 1:20.0. After the 1972 season, Eriksen joined the European long track skaters' professional league, the International Speedskating League.

World records

Discipline	Time	Date	Location
3000 m	4.33,0	28 February 1963	Oslo
1000 m	1.20,5	9 March 1968	Inzell
1000 m	1.20,3	8 February 1969	Inzell
1000 m	1.19,5	1 March 1969	Inzell
1000 m	1.19,2	15 January 1971	Davos

Source: SpeedSkatingStats.com

Personal records

- 500 m – 39.1
- 1000 m – 1:19.2
- 1500 m – 2:04.0
- 5000 m – 7:55.6
- 10000 m – 16:33.4
