= Dan Immerfall =

American speed skater

Personal information
- Full name: Daniel James Immerfall
- Born: December 14, 1955 (age 70) Madison, Wisconsin, U.S.

Sport
- Sport: Speed skating
Medal record
Men's speed skating
Representing United States
Olympic Games
Bronze medal – third place	1976 Innsbruck	500 m
World Sprint Championships
Silver medal – second place	1976 West Berlin	Sprint

Daniel James Immerfall (born December 14, 1955) is a former speed skater from the United States who specialized in the 500 meters.

Immerfall was born in Madison, Wisconsin, and started competing locally at a very young age. When he was 20, Immerfall won bronze at the 1976 Winter Olympics of Innsbruck on the 500 m. One month later, he won silver at the World Sprint Championships behind Swedish skater Johan Granath, though Granath did not win on any of the four distances, while Immerfall won both 500 m races. Immerfall was inducted in the National Speedskating Hall of Fame in 1987.

As of 2007, Immerfall was a head referee for the International Skating Union. He has two children, Ben and Abby, who are both competitive swimmers.

== Olympic career ==
=== 1976, Innsbruck, Austria ===
- 500 m: BRONZE MEDAL
- 1,000 meters: 12th

=== 1980, Lake Placid, New York ===
- 500 m: 5th

=== 1984, Sarajevo, Yugoslavia ===
- Alternate; did not compete

== Personal records ==
Event	Result	Date	Venue	WR
500 m	37.98	19 January 1980	Davos	37.00
1,000 m	1:17.46	20 January 1980	Davos	1:13.60
1,500 m	2:04.84	18 January 1976	Madonna di Campiglio	1:58.7
3,000 m	4:41.29	15 January 1978	Milwaukee	4:08.3
5,000 m	8:10.45	12 February 1977	Heerenveen	7:02.38
