= Jeremy Wotherspoon =

Canadian speed skater (born 1976)

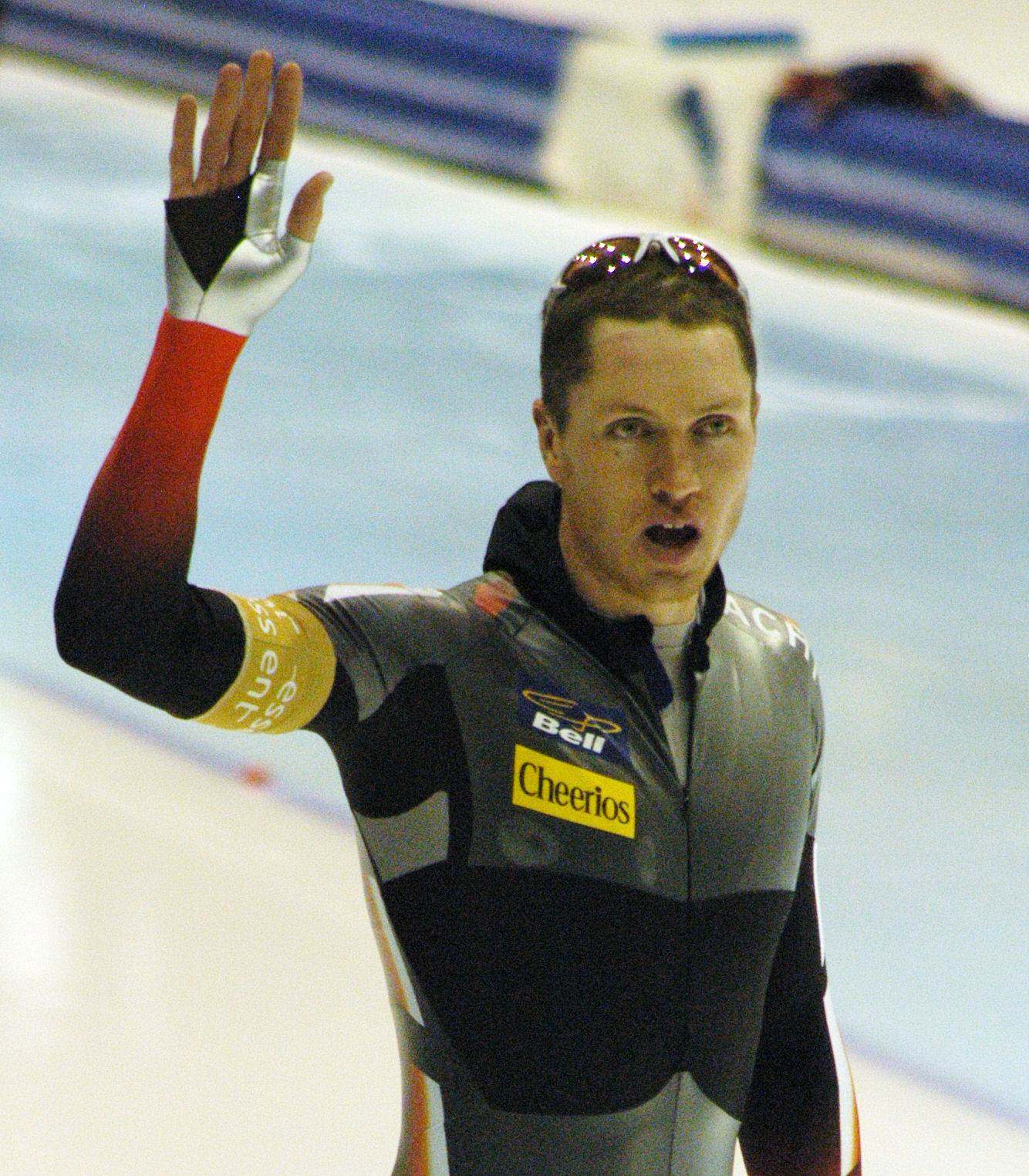
- Wotherspoon at a World Cup speed skating event in Heerenveen, Netherlands

Personal information
- Born: October 26, 1976 (age 49) Humboldt, Saskatchewan
- Height: 1.90 m (6 ft 3 in)
- Weight: 85 kg (187 lb)

Sport
- Country: Canada
- Sport: Speed skating
Medal record
Men's speed skating
Representing Canada
International speed skating competitions
Event	1st	2nd	3rd
Olympic Games	0	1	0
World Sprint Championships	4	4	1
World Distance Championships	4	3	3
Total	8	8	4
Olympic Games
Silver medal – second place	1998 Nagano	500 m
World Sprint Championships
Gold medal – first place	1999 Calgary	Sprint
Gold medal – first place	2000 Seoul	Sprint
Gold medal – first place	2002 Hamar	Sprint
Gold medal – first place	2003 Calgary	Sprint
Silver medal – second place	1998 Berlin	Sprint
Silver medal – second place	2004 Nagano	Sprint
Silver medal – second place	2005 Salt Lake City	Sprint
Silver medal – second place	2008 Heerenveen	Sprint
Bronze medal – third place	2001 Inzell	Sprint
World Single Distance Championships
Gold medal – first place	2003 Berlin	500 m
Gold medal – first place	2004 Seoul	500 m
Gold medal – first place	2008 Nagano	500 m
Gold medal – first place	2001 Salt Lake City	1000 m
Silver medal – second place	2001 Salt Lake City	500 m
Silver medal – second place	1998 Calgary	1000 m
Silver medal – second place	2004 Seoul	1000 m
Bronze medal – third place	1998 Calgary	500 m
Bronze medal – third place	2000 Nagano	500 m
Bronze medal – third place	2005 Inzell	500 m

Jeremy Lee Wotherspoon (born October 26, 1976) is a Canadian speed skater, widely recognized as one of the greatest speedskating sprinters of all time.

In December 2003, Wotherspoon became the most successful male skater in World Cup history when he claimed the 49th victory of his career. He finished his career with a record 67 World Cup wins at 500 and 1,000 metres.

Wotherspoon broke the 500 m world record on three occasions. He broke the 1000 m world record seven times.

== Career ==
=== Early career ===
Wotherspoon was born in Humboldt, Saskatchewan, but grew up in Red Deer, Alberta. There he first became involved in speedskating after signing up for a power skating class to improve his ice hockey abilities. Initially, Wotherspoon competed in both short track and long track events. He eventually chose the long track as a specialty and climbed through the junior ranks, moving to Calgary to train with the Canadian national team at the age of 17. Wotherspoon soon won medals on the World Cup circuit, with his first victories in 1997.

Wotherspoon dominated sprint events and held world records in both the 500 m and 1000 m distances. He is a four-time World Sprint Champion, taking the title four times in five years between 1999 and 2003, and a 13-time World Cup Overall Champion on the 500 m and the 1000 m. During the 1998 Winter Olympics in Nagano, Wotherspoon won a silver medal in the 500 m, despite being the favorite.

Four years later, at the 2002 Winter Olympics in Salt Lake City, Wotherspoon fell at the start of his run during the 500 m and finished 13th in the 1000 m event. The next Olympic Games in Turin in 2006, he failed to reach the podium once again, placing 9th in the 500 m event and 11th in the 1000 m. Wotherspoon, disappointed, decided to spend time alone on Mausund, a remote Norwegian island near the Arctic Circle. When asked whether he was anxious over skating after a season away from the sport, he stated "I'm more interested to see how quickly I can get back up."

=== 2010 Olympics and first retirement ===
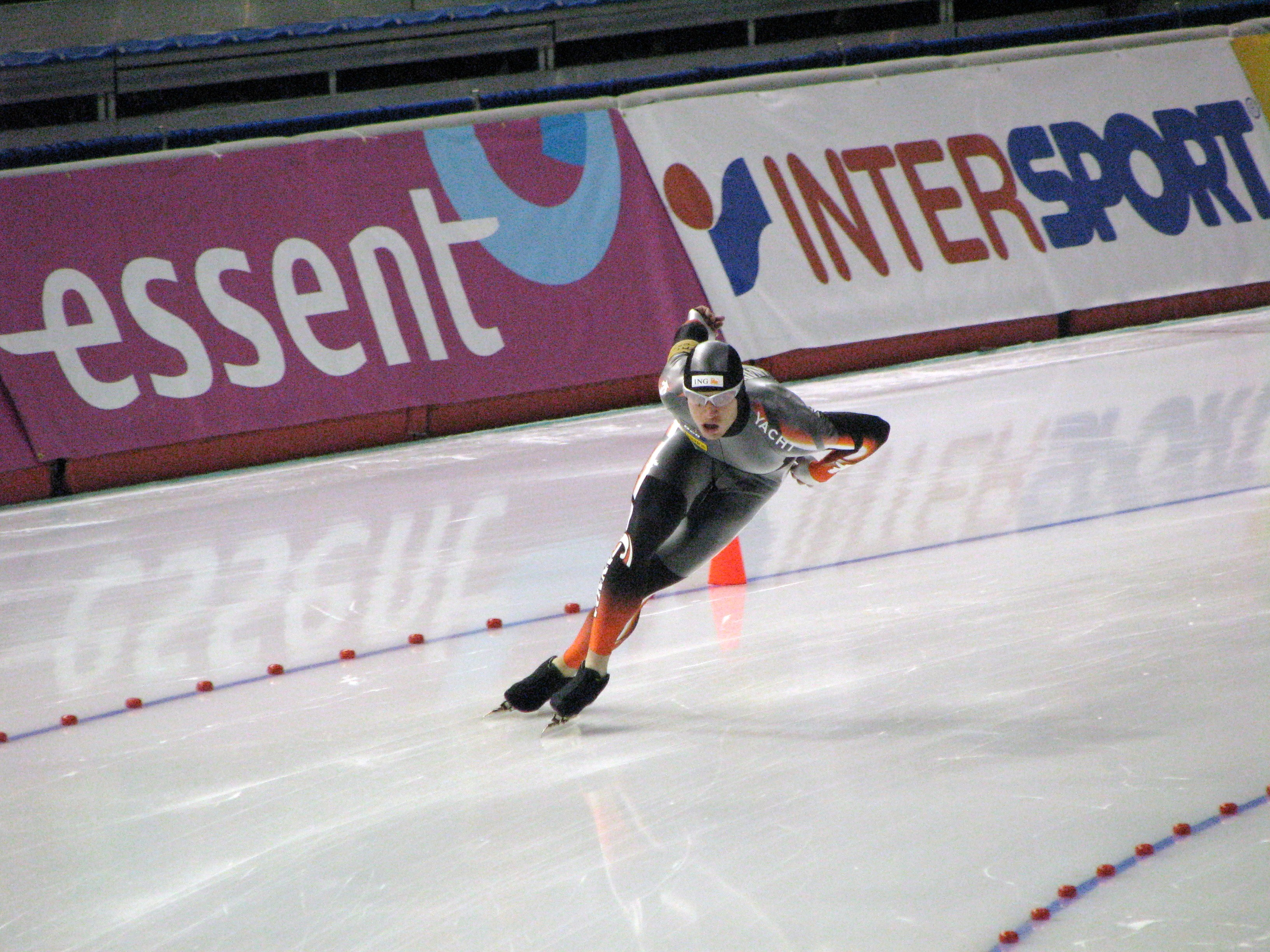
Jeremy Wotherspoon at the Essent ISU World Cup at the Olympic Oval in Calgary.

Following his time in Norway, Wotherspoon set a world record in the 500 m event on November 9, 2007. However, he later suffered an arm injury while skating in the 2008–09 World Cup season. On December 27, 2009, Wotherspoon officially secured his spot for the 500 m and 1000 m events at the 2010 Winter Olympics in Vancouver after finishing first in the Canadian trials held at the Calgary Olympic Oval. Despite this, Wotherspoon placed 9th and 14th in the Olympic events, respectively.

Wotherspoon announced his retirement from speed skating on December 6, 2009, promising to do so following the Vancouver Olympics and the 2010 season end.

=== Comeback ===
Wotherspoon announced that he was returning to speedskating in June 2013 to compete at the 2014 Winter Olympics. He failed, however, to qualify in his signature event, the 500 m sprint, and was not named to Canada's Olympic team.

=== Post-retirement ===
Following his initial retirement in 2010, Wotherspoon coached at an academy in Inzell, Germany, training skaters from countries without coaches, facilities, or formal programs. He returned there after his 2014 comeback attempt, then moved to a developmental team in Norway. In April 2016 Wotherspoon became the sprint coach for Norway's national team, intending to end that nation's three-decade Olympic medal drought in long track's sprint events.

== Personal life ==
Wotherspoon was born in Humboldt, Saskatchewan, but grew up in Red Deer, Alberta. He is married to Canadian former speed skater and 2006 Olympian Kim Weger; the couple has a daughter, Ella.

== Records ==
=== Personal bests ===
Personal records
Men's speed skating
Event	Result	Date	Location	Notes
500 m	34.03	November 9, 2007	Utah Olympic Oval, Salt Lake City	Former world record
1000 m	1:07.03	November 11, 2007	Utah Olympic Oval, Salt Lake City	
1500 m	1:46.18	December 28, 2005	Olympic Oval, Calgary	
3000 m	4:02.17	October 26, 2002	Olympic Oval, Calgary	
5000 m	7:37.36	March 10, 1996	Olympic Oval, Calgary	

=== World records ===
Discipline	Time	Date	Location
500 m	34.76	February 20, 1999	Olympic Oval, Calgary
500 m	34.63	January 29, 2000	Olympic Oval, Calgary
500 m	34.03	November 9, 2007	Utah Olympic Oval, Salt Lake City
2 x 500 m	68.310	March 15, 2008	Olympic Oval, Calgary
1000 m	1:10.16	December 29, 1997	Olympic Oval, Calgary
1000 m	1:09.09	January 15, 1999	Olympic Oval, Calgary
1000 m	1:08.66	February 20, 1999	Olympic Oval, Calgary
1000 m	1:08.49	January 12, 2000	Olympic Oval, Calgary
1000 m	1:08.35	March 18, 2000	Olympic Oval, Calgary
1000 m	1:08.28	March 11, 2001	Utah Olympic Oval, Salt Lake City
1000 m	1:07.72	December 1, 2001	Utah Olympic Oval, Salt Lake City
Sprint combination	141.995	November 22–23, 1997	Olympic Oval, Calgary
Sprint combination	140.050	January 15–16, 1999	Olympic Oval, Calgary
Sprint combination	138.310	February 20–21, 1999	Olympic Oval, Calgary
Sprint combination	137.285	December 1–2, 2002	Utah Olympic Oval, Salt Lake City
Sprint combination	137.270	January 11–12, 2003	Utah Olympic Oval, Salt Lake City
Sprint combination	137.230	January 18–19, 2003	Olympic Oval, Calgary

Source: SpeedSkatingStats.com.

From November 23, 1997, to January 29, 2012, Wotherspoon held the world record for the sprint combination: the point summation of four races (2x500 m and 2x1000 m) skated consecutively within two days, like those calculated for the World Sprint Speed Skating Championships. He improved on his own record five times since. His fastest combination of 135.355 (34.03, 34.14, 1:07.34, 1:07.03), accomplished during World Cup races at the Utah Olympic Oval over three days in November 2007 was not an official world record but has still not been bettered as of March 2019.

Furthermore, until November 2015, nearly 6 years after his retirement, Wotherspoon had skated the six fastest laps (400 m) ever, the fastest of which was a 24.32 s lap in his first 1000 m race in Salt Lake City in November 2007. His average speed in that lap was 59.21 kilometres per hour (36.79 mph).

== See also ==
- List of Canadian sports personalities

Awards
Preceded by (Netherlands) Sven Kramer	Oscar Mathisen Award; 2008	Succeeded by (United States) Shani Davis
