= Yuri Sergeev =

Soviet speed skater (1925–2024)

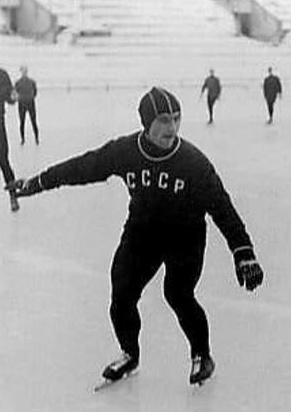
- Sergeev in 1953

Personal information
- Born: 16 July 1925 Moscow, Russian SFSR, USSR
- Died: 29 July 2024 (aged 99)
- Height: 1.92 m (6 ft 4 in)
- Weight: 88 kg (194 lb)

Sport
- Sport: Speed skating

Yuri Valentinovich Sergeev (Russian: Юрий Валентинович Сергеев; 16 July 1925 – 29 July 2024) was a Russian speed skater who competed for the Soviet Union in the 1956 Winter Olympics. He finished fourth in the 500 metres event. He was born in Moscow. Sergeev died on 29 July 2024, at the age of 99.

== World records ==
Discipline	Time	Date	Location
500 m	41,7	January 6, 1952	(Soviet Union) Medeo
500 m	41,2	January 19, 1952	(Soviet Union) Medeo
500 m	40,9	January 25, 1953	(Soviet Union) Medeo
500 m	40,8	January 19, 1955	(Soviet Union) Medeo

Source: SpeedSkatingStats.com
