= Sylvain Bouchard =

Canadian speed skater

Medal record

Men's speed skating

World Championships
Gold medal – first place	1998 Calgary	1000 m
Silver medal – second place	1998 Calgary	500 m

Sylvain Bouchard (born April 12, 1970 in Lorretteville, Quebec) is a Canadian long track speed skater. He won the 1000m event at the 1998 World Single Distance Championships. He competed at the 1994 Winter Olympics, finishing 4th at the 500m event and 5th at the 1000m event. He also competed at the 1998 Winter Olympics, finishing 4th on 500m and 5th on 1000m. He earned the world record time in the 1000m event in 1995 and 1998. He retired from competition the same year.

== World records ==
Over the course of his career, Sylvain Bouchard skated two world record:

Event	Time	Date	Venue
1000 m	1.12,27	December 22, 1995	(Canada) Calgary
1000 m	1.09,60	March 29, 1998	(Canada) Calgary

Source: SpeedSkatingStats.com
