= World record progression sprint combination speed skating men =

The world record progression of the men's speed skating sprint combination as recognised by the International Skating Union. The sprint combination consists of four races in one weekend: two 500 meter races and two 1000 meter races. The four races score points following the Samalog method.

#	Name	Points	Date	Venue	Meet	Ref
1	(Sweden) Hasse Börjes	163.300	11-12 December 1971	Kongsberg		
2	(Finland) Leo Linkovesi	156.500	7-8 January 1972	Davos		
3	(Germany) Erhard Keller	155.800	4-5 March 1972	Inzell		
4	(Norway) Lasse Efskind	154.400	13-14 January 1973	Davos		
5	(Soviet Union) Valery Muratov	153.390	17-18 March 1975	Almaty		
6	(Soviet Union) Yevgeny Kulikov	153.250	28-29 March 1975	Almaty		
7	(Soviet Union) Yevgeny Kulikov	151.190	20-21 March 1976	Almaty		
8	(United States) Eric Heiden	150.250	12-13 January 1980	Davos		
9	(Canada) Gaetan Boucher	148.785	30-31 January 1981	Davos		
10	(Soviet Union) Pavel Pegov	146.955	25-26 March 1983	Almaty		
11	(Soviet Union) Igor Zhelezovsky	145.945	25-26 February 1989	Heerenveen		
12	(United States) Dan Jansen	145.580	19-20 March 1993	Calgary		
13	(United States) Dan Jansen	144.815	29-30 January 1994	Calgary		
14	(Japan) Yasunori Miyabe	144.445	25-26 March 1994	Calgary		
15	(Japan) Manabu Horii	143.425	1-3 March 1996	Calgary		
16	(Canada) Jeremy Wotherspoon	141.995	22-23 November 1997	Calgary		
17	(Canada) Jeremy Wotherspoon	140.050	15-16 January 1999	Calgary		
18	(Canada) Jeremy Wotherspoon	138.310	20-21 February 1999	Calgary		
19	(Canada) Jeremy Wotherspoon	137.285	1-2 December 2002	Salt Lake City		
20	(Canada) Jeremy Wotherspoon	137.270	11-12 January 2003	Salt Lake City		
21	(Canada) Jeremy Wotherspoon	137.230	18-19 January 2003	Calgary	2003 WSCh	
22	(Netherlands) Stefan Groothuis	136.810	28-29 January 2012	Calgary	2012 WSCh	
23	(Netherlands) Michel Mulder	136.790	26-27 January 2013	Salt Lake City	2013 WSCh	
24	(Netherlands) Kai Verbij	136.065	25-26 February 2017	Calgary	2017 WSCh	
25	(Netherlands) Jenning de Boo	134.670	5-6 March 2026	Heerenveen	2026 WSCH	
