= Keiichi Suzuki (speed skater) =

Japanese speed skater (1942–2025)

Keiichi Suzuki 鈴木 惠一
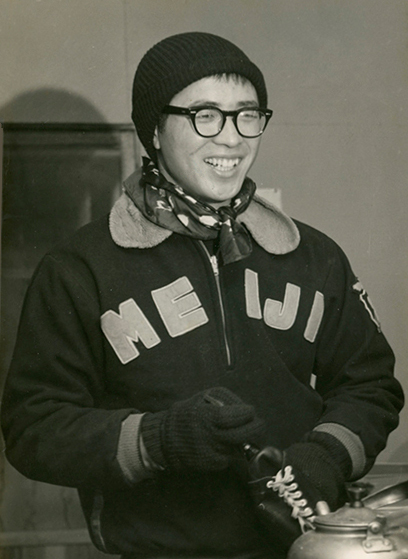
- Suzuki in 1962

Personal information
- Born: 10 November 1942 Karafuto, Japan (now Sakhalin Oblast, Russia)
- Died: 21 January 2025 (aged 82) Tokorozawa, Saitama Prefecture, Japan
- Height: 1.71 m (5 ft 7 in)
- Weight: 72 kg (159 lb)

Sport
- Sport: Speed skating; Sprint
- Club: Meiji University; Ministry of Land Infrastructure and Transport
Medal record
Men's speed skating
Representing Japan
World Sprint Championships
Silver medal – second place	1970 West Allis	Sprint

Keiichi Suzuki (鈴木 惠一, Suzuki Keiichi; 10 November 1942 – 21 January 2025) was a Japanese speed skater. He competed at the 1964, 1968, and 1972 Winter Olympics in the 500 m and 1500 m events with his best result being fifth place in the 500 m in 1964. He set two world records in the 500 m event in 1969 and 1970.

Suzuki took the Athlete's Oath at the 1972 Winter Olympics in Sapporo.

Suzuki died from kidney failure on 21 January 2025, at the age of 82.

== World records ==
Discipline	Time	Date	Location
500 m	39.2	March 1, 1969	Eisstadion Inzell, Inzell
500 m	38.71	March 7, 1970	Eisstadion Inzell, Inzell

Source: SpeedSkatingStats.com
