= Leif Efskind =

Norwegian surgeon

- Born: 10 May 1904; Verdal Municipality, Norway
- Died: 26 February 1987 (aged 82)
- Education: University of Oslo
- Occupations: physician, a surgeon
- Employers: Rikshospitalet; University of Oslo
- Children: Lasse Efskind

Leif Efskind (10 May 1904 – 26 February 1987) was a Norwegian surgeon. He was the first to routinely perform heart surgery in Norway and also performed the first kidney transplant in Scandinavia.

== Biography ==
He was born at Verdal Municipality in Nordre Trondheim county, Norway. He graduated from the University of Oslo in 1929. He was associated with the Rikshospitalet and was a professor of surgery at the University of Oslo. He undertook clinical training at hospitals in Hamar and Namdal before joining the Rikshospitalet in Oslo in 1936. While at the Rikshospitalet, he completed a doctoral thesis, which he obtained in 1940, on the peritoneum. During the Second World War he worked at Ullevål Hospital, interrupted by a brief imprisonment at Grini detention camp, and returned to Rikshospitalet at war's end.

Johan Holst had been the senior surgical consultant at Rikshospitalet, and Efskind succeeded him when Holst died in 1952. He developed a new technique for opening sclerotic (fused) heart valves using the nail of his little finger effectively as a knife to open the valves; he performed over 1000 such procedures. More complex procedures required more complex techniques to allow surgeons to operate for a longer time on the heart without causing brain damage, and Efskind oversaw Christian Cappelen's development of a heart-lung machine in 1959 that allowed the surgical treatment of more heart diseases. Efskind also performed the first kidney transplant in Scandinavia in 1956.

Efskind was married to Dagny Mjaaland from 1929 to 1954, and Paulin Vigre from 1960. He was the father of Lasse Efskind, a medical doctor and speedskater.
