= Kevin Scott (speed skater) =

Canadian speed skater

John Kevin Scott (born November 12, 1969, in Elliot Lake, Ontario) is a world-record setting speed skater from Sault Ste. Marie, Ontario. Scott became known on the Canadian and international speed skating circuits while competing in three junior world championships. He was also a member of Canada's National Team for nine years.

Scott's skating career includes appearances at both the 1992 Olympic Games in Albertville, France and the 1994 Games in Lillehammer, Norway. Scott competed at eight senior world championships, setting a world record in 1993 in the 1,000-metre. He also won a gold medal at the 1993-1994 World championships. In addition, Scott holds numerous Canadian records in the 500, 1,000 and 1,500-metre events.

Accolades include being named Canada's top male athlete by the Canadian Athletic Bureau, Canada's top male speed skater by the Canadian Amateur Speed Skating Association. In 1994 Scott was awarded the Rotary Club H. P. Broughton Award as Sault Ste. Marie Athlete of the Year.

Scott is currently a tax lawyer working in British Columbia and partner at KSW Lawyers. On September 30, 2006, he was named one of the first ten inductees into Sault Ste Marie's Walk of Fame.

== World record ==
Event	Time	Date	Venue
1000 m	1.12,54	December 17, 1993	(Canada) Calgary

Source: SpeedSkatingStats.com
