= Peder Østlund =

Norwegian speed skater

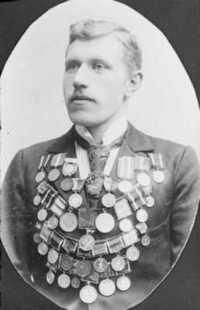

Personal information
- Born: 7 May 1872 Trondheim, Norway
- Died: 22 January 1939 (aged 66)

Sport
- Country: Norway
- Sport: Men's speed skating
- Club: Trondhjems Skøiteklub
Medal record
Representing Norway
Men's speed skating
World Championships
Gold medal – first place	1898 Davos	Allround
Gold medal – first place	1899 Berlin	Allround
European Championships
Gold medal – first place	1899 Davos	Allround
Gold medal – first place	1900 Štrbské Pleso	Allround

Peder Østlund (7 May 1872 – 22 January 1939) was a Norwegian speed skater.

Peder Østlund held the first position on the Adelskalender ranking during two periods, for a total of almost 10 years (3,644 days). He became World Allround Champion in 1898 and 1899 and European Allround Champion in 1899 and 1900. He was Norwegian Allround Champion in 1898.

Østlund held world records ten times throughout his career. In Davos on the weekend of 10–11 February 1900 he set four of them.

Østlund represented the club Trondhjems Skøiteklub.

== Records ==
=== Personal bests ===
- 500 m - 45.2
- 1,000 m - 1;34.0
- 1,500 m - 2:22.6
- 3,000 m - 6:56.4
- 5,000 m - 8:51.8
- 10,000 m - 17:50.6

=== World records ===
Discipline	Time	Date	Location
1500 m	2.32,6	25 February 1893	Hamar
1500 m	2.31,4	24 February 1894	Hamar
1500 m	2.28,8	25 February 1894	Hamar
500 m	0.46,6	7 February 1897	Trondheim
1500 m	2.23,6	7 February 1898	Davos
1000 m	1.38,0	16 January 1899	Davos
500 m	0.45,2	10 February 1900	Davos
1000 m	1.34,0	10 February 1900	Davos
1500 m	2.22,6	11 February 1900	Davos
10,000 m	17.50,6	11 February 1900	Davos

Source: SpeedSkatingStats.com
