= Arnulf Sunde =

Norwegian speed skater

Arnulf Sunde (born 12 October 1951) is a former speed skater from Norway, who represented his native country at the 1976 Winter Olympics in Innsbruck, Austria. There he finished in sixth place in the men's 500 metres, together with the Netherlands' Jan Bazen.

Sunde competed for Gjøvik SK. His best performance at the World Sprint Championship was 21st place in 1972.

== Personal bests ==
Event	Result	Venue	Date
500 m	38.71	Medeo	20 March 1976
1,000 m	1:19.8	Gjøvik	24 February 1979
