= Einar Halvorsen =

Norwegian speedskater

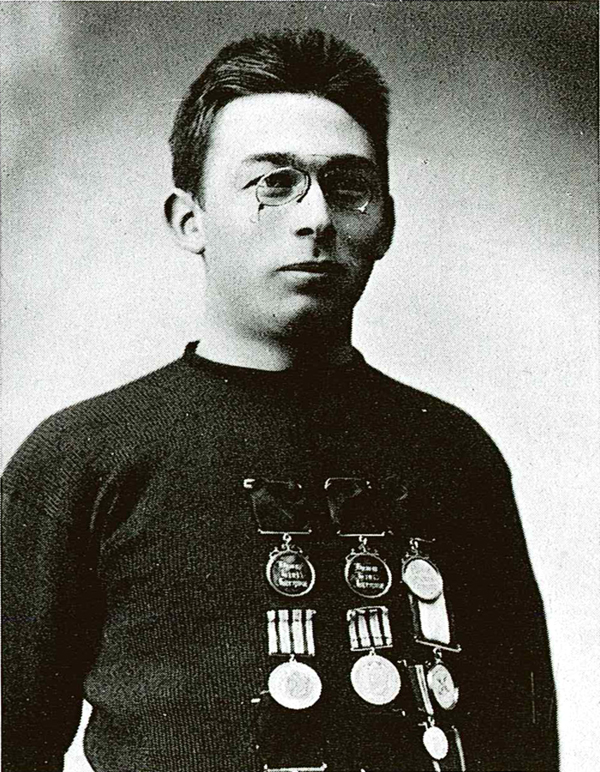
Einar Halvorsen

Einar Halvorsen (7 March 1872 – 23 April 1964) was a Norwegian speedskater. He set a total of six world records during his career.

== Biography ==
Halvorsen was born in Hamar on 7 March 1872.

In 1894 he won the first official Norwegian championship in speedskating. He set world record in 500 m three times, twice in 5000 m, and once in 1500 m.

His time 2.29,6 in 1500 m in 1894 made him the first person to finish the distance in less than 2.30.

Halvorsen died on 23 April 1964.

== World records ==
Discipline	Time	Date	Location
500 m	0.50,2	28 February 1892	(Norway) Hamar
5000 m	9.10,2	28 February 1892	(Norway) Hamar
500 m	0.48,0	26 February 1893	(Norway) Hamar
5000 m	9.07,0	26 February 1893	(Norway) Hamar
500 m	0.47,0	24 February 1894	(Norway) Hamar
1500 m	2.29,6	24 February 1894	(Norway) Hamar

Source: SpeedSkatingStats.com
