= James D. Mauseth =

American botanist (born 1948)

- Born: 1948 (age 77–78); Washington, U.S.
- Education: University of Washington
- Occupations: Botanist; author; professor

James D. Mauseth is an American botanist and botanical author. He is Professor Emeritus in the Department of Integrative Biology at the University of Texas at Austin.

Born in 1948 in Washington, he did his undergraduate and PhD studies at the University of Washington, Seattle. He joined the University of Texas at Austin in 1975, where he remained until his retirement in 2017. His research has focused on plants with unusual forms, like cacti and parasitic plants. He has authored the widely used textbooks Plant Anatomy and Botany: An Introduction to Plant Biology.

== Books ==
- Plant Anatomy, 1988
- Botany: An Introduction to Plant Biology, 1991 (6th edition 2017)
- Plants and People, 2012
