= Jim Chapin (speed skater) =

American speed skater

Personal information
- Born: February 27, 1955 (age 71) St. Louis, Missouri, United States

Sport
- Sport: Speed skating

Jim Chapin (born February 27, 1955) is an American speed skater who competed at the 1976 Winter Olympics and the 1980 Winter Olympics.
