= Erhard Keller =

German speed skater

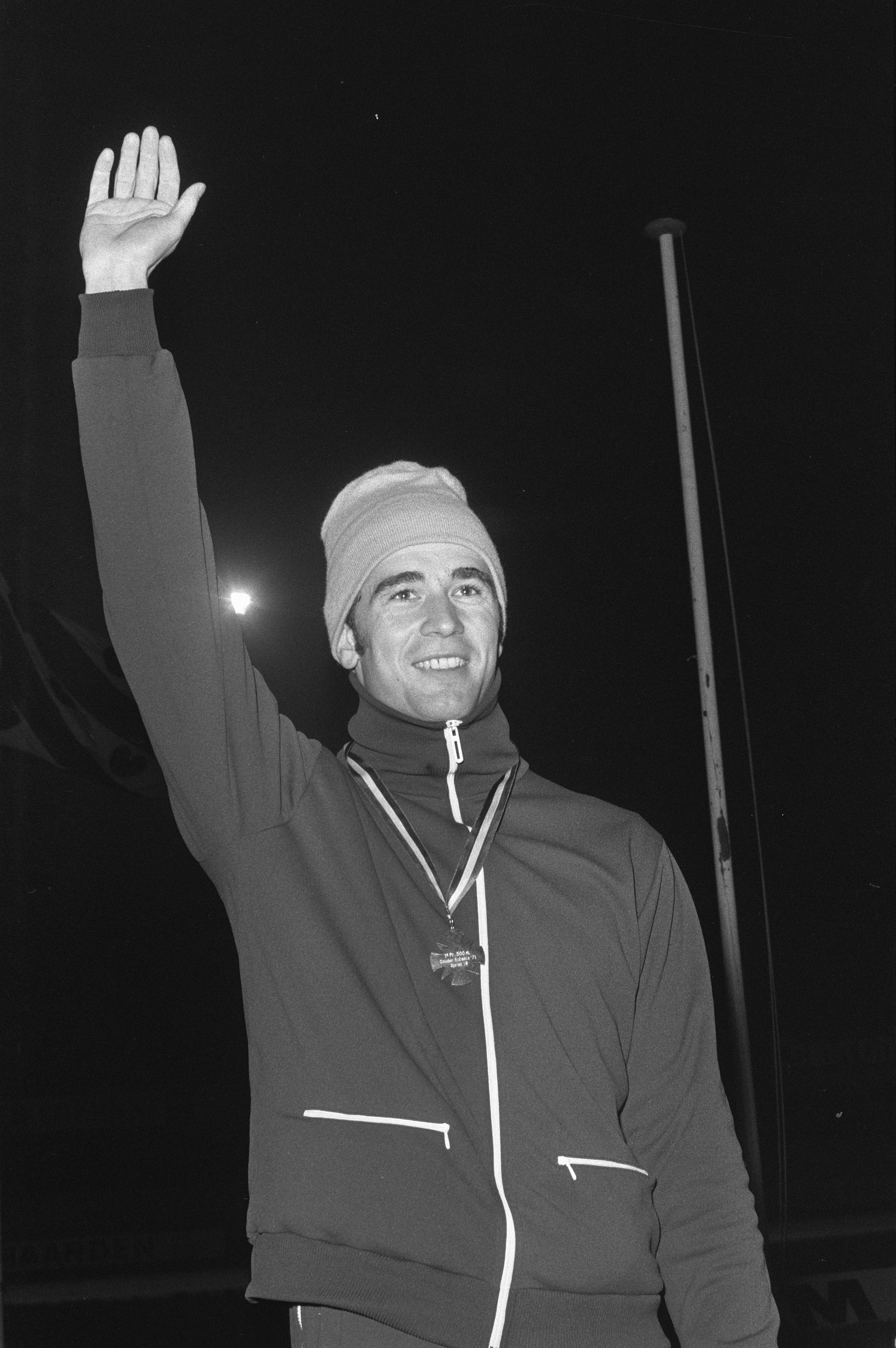
- Keller in 1971

Personal information
- Born: 24 December 1944 (age 81) Günzburg, Bavaria, Germany
- Height: 1.83 m (6 ft 0 in)
- Weight: 78 kg (172 lb)

Sport
- Sport: Speed skating
- Club: MEV, München; DEC Frillensee, Inzell
Medal record
Men's speed skating
Representing West Germany
Olympic Games
Gold medal – first place	1968 Grenoble	500 m
Gold medal – first place	1972 Sapporo	500 m
World Sprint Championships
Gold medal – first place	1971 Inzelli	Sprint

Erhard Keller (born 24 December 1944) is a former speed skater from Germany.

== Career ==
Competing for West Germany, Keller specialised on the sprint distances – the 500 m and the 1000 m – and he joined the world's sprint skating elite in 1965. In December 1967, he equalled Yevgeny Grishin's world record on the 500 m by skating that distance in 39.5 seconds and the next month, on 28 January 1968, he beat Grishin's world record, to the very day five years after Grishin had set it.

Keller, studying dentistry at LMU Munich at the time, then participated in the 1968 Winter Olympics in Grenoble. There, the "flying dentist" became Olympic Champion on the 500 m (a distance in which he was still the world record holder), making him the first German male Olympic Champion in speed skating in history – before any other East German or West German or German Olympic Champions in speed skating that would follow. He was of course preceded by East-German Helga Haase, who won gold at the 1960 Winter Olympics at Squaw Valley for the unified German team.

In 1971, Keller became champion at the ISU Sprint Championships (the forerunner of the World Sprint Championships). The next year, he became Olympic Champion on the 500 m again (setting a new Olympic record in the process) at the 1972 Winter Olympics in Sapporo. After the 1972 speed skating season, Keller became a professional speed skater, and he graduated in dentistry in 1973. After 1974, Keller no longer participated in any international tournaments. He became a professional dentist in Munich in 1975 and only participated for a few more years in national tournaments.

== Records ==
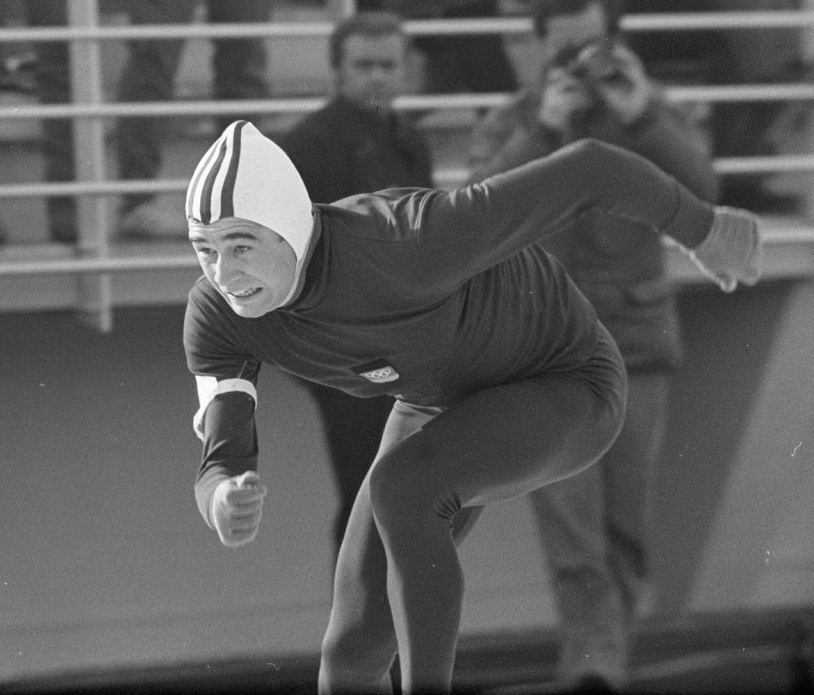
Erhard Keller in 1968

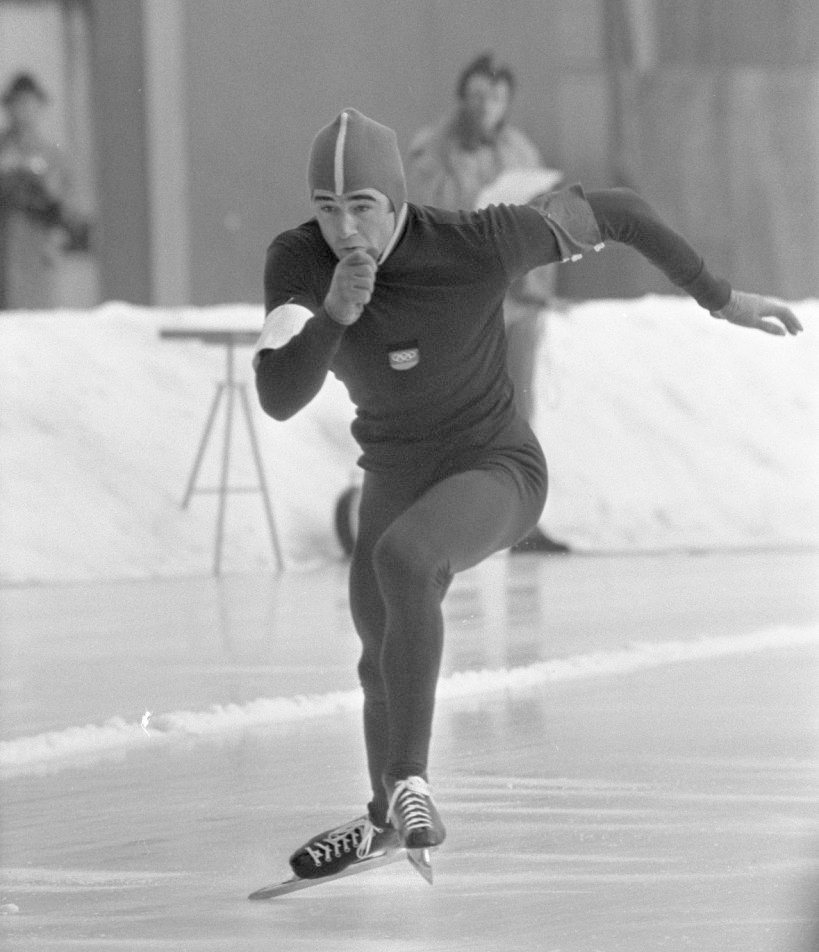
Erhard Keller in 1970

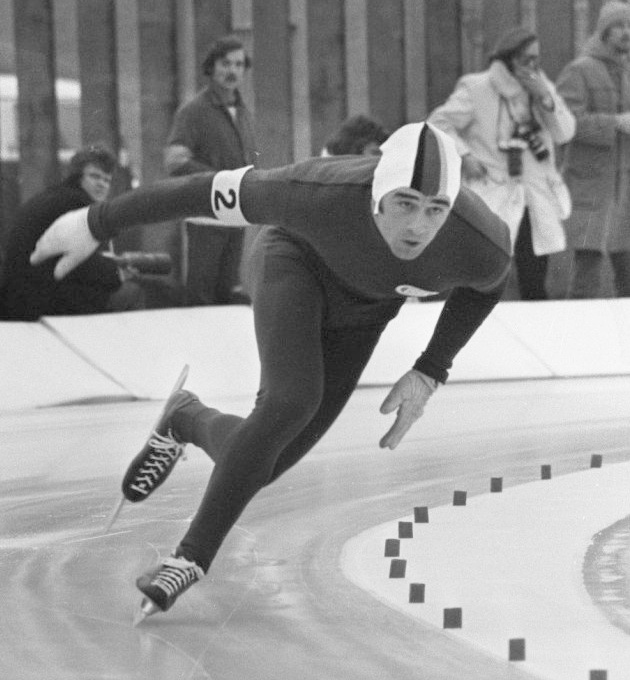
Erhard Keller in 1973

=== World records ===
Over the course of his career, Keller skated 6 world records (his 500 m world record of 38.0 equalling the existing world record; others would equal it too):

Discipline	Time	Date	Location
500 m	39.2	28 January 1968	Inzell
500 m	38.42	14 March 1971	Inzell
500 m	38.30	2 January 1972	Inzell
500 m	38.0	4 March 1972	Inzell
1000 m	1:18.5	4 March 1972	Inzell
Sprint combination	155.800	5 March 1972	Inzell

Source: SpeedSkatingStats.com

=== Personal records ===
To put these personal records in perspective, the last column (WR) lists the official world records on the dates that Keller skated his personal records.

Distance	Result	Date	Location	WR
500 m	38.0	4 March 1972	Inzell	38.0
1000 m	1:18.5	4 March 1972	Inzell	1:18.8
1500 m	2:05.5	5 March 1967	Inzell	2:03.9
3000 m	4:42.0	1 January 1966	Inzell	4:26.8
5000 m	8:08.0	13 January 1967	Madonna di Campiglio	7:28.1
10000 m	17:20.6	9 January 1966	Madonna di Campiglio	15:33.0
Big combination	183.938	14 January 1967	Madonna di Campiglio	178.253
Small combination	178.446	5 March 1967	Inzell	none
Sprint combination	155.800	5 March 1972	Inzell	156.500

Note that the small combination was not an official ISU world record event until 1981.

Keller has an Adelskalender score of 180.663 points.
