= Yevgeny Grishin (speed skater) =

Soviet Speed skater

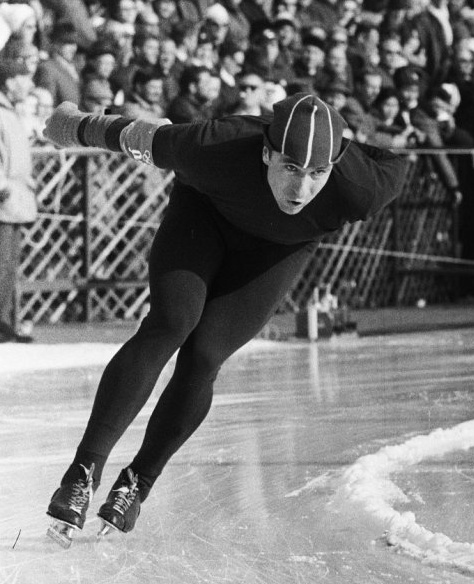
- Yevgeny Grishin in 1964

Personal information
- Born: 23 March 1931 Tula, Russian SFSR, Soviet Union
- Died: 9 July 2005 (aged 74) Moscow, Russia
- Height: 1.74 m (5 ft 8 1/2 in)
- Weight: 78 kg (172 lb)

Sport
- Sport: Speed skating
- Club: CSKA Moskva
Medal record
Representing Soviet Union
Olympic Games
Gold medal – first place	1956 Cortina d'Ampezzo	500 m
Gold medal – first place	1956 Cortina d'Ampezzo	1500 m
Gold medal – first place	1960 Squaw Valley	500 m
Gold medal – first place	1960 Squaw Valley	1500 m
Silver medal – second place	1964 Innsbruck	500 m
World Championships
Bronze medal – third place	1954 Sapporo	Allround
Bronze medal – third place	1956 Oslo	Allround
European Championships
Gold medal – first place	1956 Helsinki	Allround

Yevgeny Romanovich Grishin (Russian: Евгений Романович Гришин; 23 March 1931 – 9 July 2005) was a Soviet and Russian speedskater. Grishin trained for the largest part of his speedskating career at CSKA Moscow. A four-time Olympian (1956, 1960, 1964, 1968), he became European Champion in 1956, and won Olympic gold in the 500 meter and 1500 meter events in both 1956 and 1960 Winter Olympics (sharing the 1500 meter victories with respectively Yuri Mikhaylov and Roald Aas), competing for the USSR team. Along with his compatriot Lidiya Skoblikova, he was the most successful athlete at the 1960 Winter Olympics.

Grishin was the first to break the 40 second barrier on the 500 m, skating 39.6 in an unofficial test race in Squaw Valley in 1960, just after the Winter Olympic Games at the same location. Three years later, on 27–28 January 1963, he set officially ratified world records 39.6 and 39.5 at the Medeu track. He also won 2 bronze medals in the World Championships, in 1954 and 1956.

He had 12 single distance wins in his 14 starts in allround championships. Over the course of his career Grishin set seven world records; the 1:22.8 time of the 1000 m lasted 12 years.

== World records ==
Over the course of his career, Grishin skated seven world records:

Discipline	Time	Date	Location
1500 m	2:09.8	10 January 1955	Medeo
1000 m	1:22.8	12 January 1955	Medeo
500 m	40.2	22 January 1956	Misurina
500 m	40.2	28 January 1956	Misurina
1500 m	2:08.6	30 January 1956	Misurina
500 m	39.6	27 January 1963	Medeo
500 m	39.5	28 January 1963	Medeo

Source: SpeedSkatingStats.com
