= Hasse Börjes =

Swedish speed skater (born 1948)

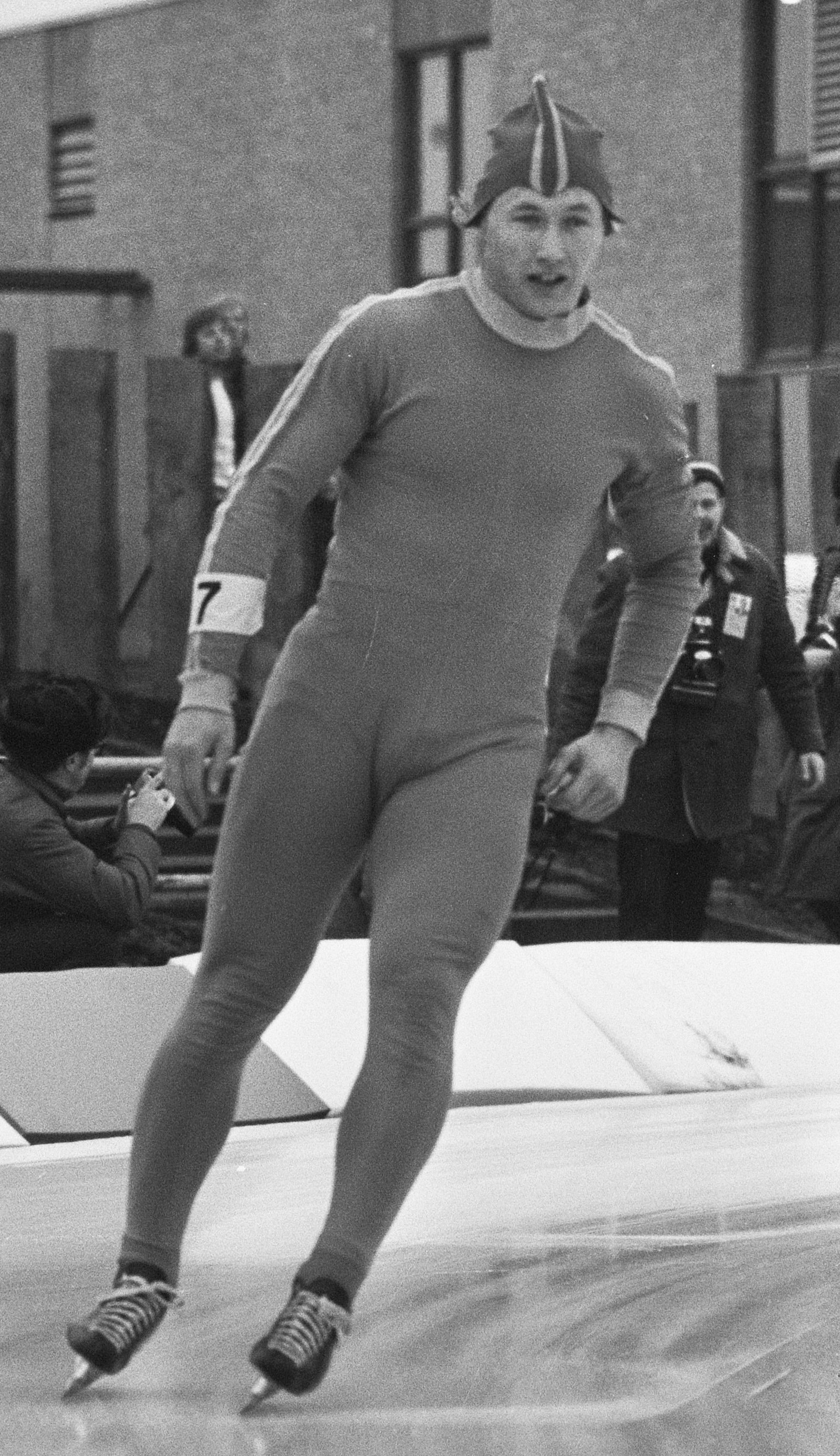

Personal information
- Born: 25 January 1948 (age 78) Rättvik, Sweden

Sport
- Sport: Speed skating
Medal record
Representing Sweden
Men's Speed skating
Olympic Games
Silver medal – second place	1972 Sapporo	500 m

Hasse Börjes (born 25 January 1948) is a Swedish speed skater, Olympic silver medalist and former world record holder in the 500 m.

Born in Rättvik, at the 1972 Olympics in Sapporo Börjes was silver medalist at the 500 meter speed skating event. During those games he also was the Swedish flag-bearer during the opening ceremony.

Hasse Börjes improved the world record on 500m three times in 1970 (38.9 seconds, 38.87, and 38.46 seconds), and equaled the then record in 1972 (38.0 seconds).

== World records ==
Discipline	Time	Date	Location
500 m	0.38,9	18 January 1970	(Switzerland) Davos
500 m	0.38,87	25 January 1970	(Soviet Union) Medeo
500 m	0.38,46	8 March 1970	(Germany) Inzell
Sprint combination	163.300	12 December 1971	(Norway) Kongsberg
500 m	0.38,0	4 March 1972	(Germany) Inzell

Source: SpeedSkatingStats.com
