= Wilhelm Mauseth =

Norwegian speed skater

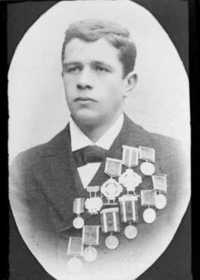
Wilhelm Mauseth

Wilhelm Mauseth (8 October 1875 – 11 June 1948) was a Norwegian speedskater.

He set a world record in 500 m in 1895 with the time 46.8. He was two time national all-round champion, in 1895 and 1896. Around the turn of the century he emigrated to South Africa and he married Sarah Anne Beeming in Cape Town, South Africa.

Wilhelm Alfred Mauseth was a student at Trondhiems Technical College. Graduated in 1897 at the engineering line.

1897-1903 Engineering Assistant City Council of Cape Town. 1903-04 Chief Surveyor on Irrigation Scheme Rhodes Trust's Farms, Golesberg. 1904-07 own business in Cape Town under the company Mauseth & Goodchild Architects and Surveyors during this time he did the surveying work on the Victoria Falls bridge which opened in 1905. From 1907 Assistant Engineer Rhodesia Railways, Mafeking, South Africa. Mauseth also worked as a surveyor for George Pauling, the main contractor to Cecil Rhodes, who was at that time opening up and building a railway and telegraph system in Rhodesia. 1918 Hydraulic Engineer Orange River, Mauseth had a hand in surveying the sewage system in Johannesburg.

He was in the Cape Colony Cyclists Corp (as William Alfred Mauseth 23932) from 21 Jan 1901 to 24 April 1901

He attested (as W.A, Manseth) into the South African Orange River Scouts on 7 April 1902 and was discharged on 30 June 1902 when the regiment was disbanded.

Later as William Alfred Manseth, he fought with distinction with the Nyasaland Rhodesia Mechanical Forces in the 1914-1918 Great War (possibly in Tanganyika), he was promoted Temp. Captain and was "mentioned in dispatches" He was awarded the MBE by the British government.

"Manseth, T.Capt. William Alfred, S.A.S.C. was made a Member of the Military Division of the Most Excellent Order of the British Empire on Tuesday 3rd June 1919 as Published in the Tenth Supplement to The London Gazette of Friday 30th May 1919"

The reason for the name changes in his life are interesting, During the Boer War the name Wilhelm seemed to be too "Dutch" for the English, so this was changed to the more anglicized William, later on the Mauseth was changed to Manseth which was much more English. This was used as a family name until his death, so he died as William Alfred Manseth.

He died of cancer.

== World record ==
Discipline	Time	Date	Location
500 m	0.46,8	3 February 1895	(Norway) Trondheim

Source: SpeedSkatingStats.com
