= Valery Muratov =

Soviet speed skater

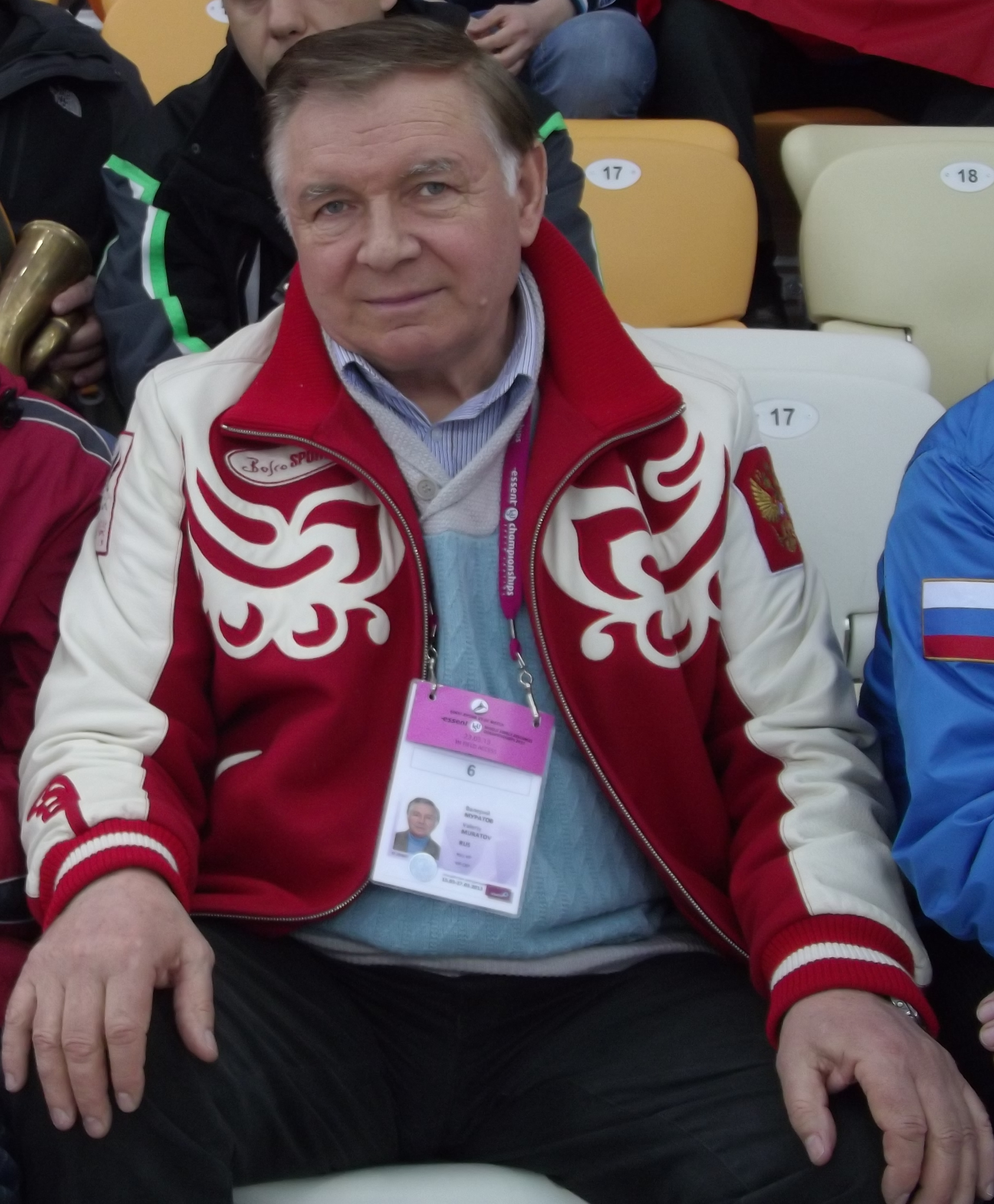

Personal information
- Full name: Valery Alekseyevich Muratov
- Born: 1 May 1946 (age 80) Kolomna, Soviet Union

Sport
- Sport: Speed skating
Medal record
Men's speed skating
Representing Soviet Union
Olympic Games
Silver medal – second place	1976 Innsbruck	500 m
Bronze medal – third place	1972 Sapporo	500 m
Bronze medal – third place	1976 Innsbruck	1,000 m
World Sprint Championships
Gold medal – first place	1970 West Allis	Sprint
Gold medal – first place	1973 Oslo	Sprint
Silver medal – second place	1972 Eskilstuna	Sprint
Bronze medal – third place	1975 Gothenburg	Sprint

Valery Alekseyevich Muratov (Russian: Вале́рий Алексе́евич Мура́тов, born 1 May 1946 in Kolomna) is a former ice speed skater from the USSR, who represented his native country in three consecutive Winter Olympics, starting in 1968 in Grenoble, France, and won three medals. He trained in Kolomna at Burevestnik and later at the Armed Forces sports society.

In 1972 Muratov was awarded the Medal For Labour Heroism.

== World records ==
Discipline	Time	Date	Location
500 m	0.39,09	9 January 1970	Medeo
500 m	0.38,99	24 January 1970	Medeo
1000 m	1.19,2	24 January 1970	Medeo
500 m	0.38,73	29 January 1970	Medeo
1000 m	1.16,92	17 March 1975	Medeo
500 m	0.37,85	18 March 1975	Medeo
Sprint combination	153.390	18 March 1975	Medeo

Source: SpeedSkatingStats.com
