= Yevgeny Kulikov =

Russian speed skater

Personal information
- Native name: Евге́ний Кулико́в
- Nationality: Russian
- Born: Yevgeny Nikolayevich Kulikov; May 25, 1950 (age 76) Bogdanovich, Sverdlovsk Oblast, Russian SFSR, Soviet Union
- Height: 1.80 m (5 ft 11 in)
- Weight: 75 kg (165 lb)

Sport
- Country: Soviet Union
- Sport: Speed skating
Medal record
Men's speed skating
Representing the Soviet Union
Olympic Games
Gold medal – first place	1976 Innsbruck	500 m
Silver medal – second place	1980 Lake Placid	500 m
World Sprint Championships
Silver medal – second place	1975 Gothenburg	Sprint
Bronze medal – third place	1977 Alkmaar	Sprint

Yevgeny Nikolayevich Kulikov (Russian: Евге́ний Никола́евич Кулико́в, born 25 May 1950 in Sverdlovsk Oblast) is a former speed skater who specialised in the sprint.

Yevgeny Kulikov trained at Burevestnik Voluntary Sports Society. Competing for the Soviet Union he became the first to break the 38 seconds barrier on the 500 m in 1975 and over the course of the next two weeks he lowered his own 500 m world record three more times, finishing with a time of 37.00, exactly one second below the previous world record. He would remain the 500 m world record holder for 8 years. For his achievements he received the 1975 Oscar Mathisen Award.

At the 1976 Winter Olympics in Innsbruck, he won gold on the 500 m despite the fact that he had a cold and a fever during his race. As the defending 500 m Olympic Champion and world record holder, he won silver at the 1980 Winter Olympics in Lake Placid, being beaten by Eric Heiden.

At the World Sprint Championships, Kulikov won silver in 1975 and bronze in 1977. In 1981, Kulikov lowered his own 500 m world record once more, becoming the first man to break the 37-second barrier.

== Records ==
=== World records ===
Over the course of his career, Kulikov skated nine world records:

Discipline	Time	Date	Location
500 m	37.99	15 March 1975	(Soviet Union) Medeo
500 m	37.97	16 March 1975	(Soviet Union) Medeo
500 m	37.20	28 March 1975	(Soviet Union) Medeo
500 m	37.00	29 March 1975	(Soviet Union) Medeo
Sprint combination	153.250	29 March 1975	(Soviet Union) Medeo
1000 m	1:15.70	20 March 1976	(Soviet Union) Medeo
Sprint combination	151.190	21 March 1976	(Soviet Union) Medeo
1000 m	1:15.33	19 March 1977	(Soviet Union) Medeo
500 m	36.91	28 March 1981	(Soviet Union) Medeo

Source: SpeedSkatingStats.com

=== Personal records ===
Event	Result	Date	Venue
500 m	36.91	28 March 1981	Medeo
1000 m	1:15.33	19 March 1977	Medeo
1500 m	2:06.3	16 December 1977	Medeo
3000 m	4:37.7	23 August 1981	Leningrad

Awards
Preceded by (Norway) Sten Stensen	Oscar Mathisen Award; 1975	Succeeded by (Norway) Sten Stensen
