= Eisstadion Davos =

Ice hockey venue in Davos, Switzerland

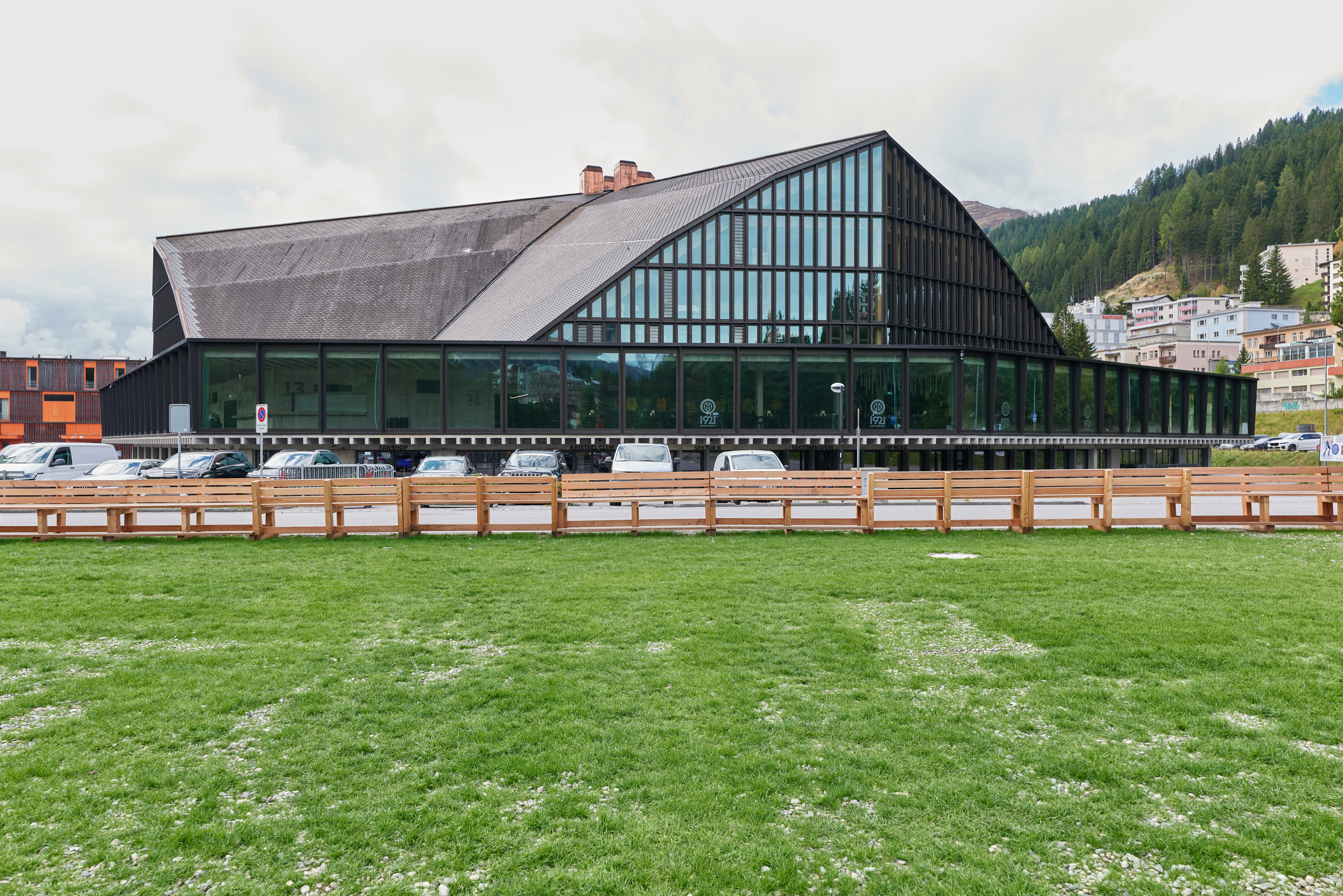
- Interactive map of Eisstadion Davos
- Former names: Eisstadion Davos (1979–2007, 2019–2025); Vaillant Arena (2007–2019)
- Location: Kurgartenstrasse, CH - 7270 Davos Platz
- Coordinates: 46°47′55″N 9°49′35″E
- Owner: City of Davos
- Operator: Davos Tourismus
- Capacity: 7,080

Construction
- Built: 1979
- Opened: 1979
- Renovated: 1981, 1998, 2005, 2006, 2018–2021

Tenant
- HC Davos (NL) (1979–present)

Eisstadion Davos, also branded VAT Arena, is an indoor arena in Davos, Switzerland. It is primarily used for ice hockey and is the home arena of HC Davos. It holds 7,080 people, of which 3,280 are seated. Every year the Spengler Cup is played in this arena.

Major renovation of the arena started at the conclusion of the 2017–18 season to upgrade most of the stands and the concourse, at a total cost of around CHF 27 million. The seating capacity remained unchanged. Construction began in 2018 and was completed in 2021.

== Naming ==
During the 2025/2026 season, the arena was sponsored by Polish cryptocurrency exchange Zondacrypto. Following Zondacrypto's insolvency, for the 2026/2027 season the arena was rebranded as VAT Arena after sponsor VAT Group.

== Speed skating ==
The open natural ice rink beside the arena, Eisstadion Davos, was in the past (up until 1997) the venue for many international speed skating events and many speed skating world records have been broken here. It still continues to be used for Swiss Championships in speed skating. It is an outdoor, natural, ice rink (as opposed to ice rinks that are indoor and/or use artificial ice) and lies 1,560 metres (almost one mile) above sea level.

For the high velocities achieved in speed skating, high altitudes are favorable due to lower air drag, and since the ice conditions produced were also often very favorable, many World Records were set in Davos, beginning with Peder Østlund who set four records in 1898. The arena also had a reputation for variable conditions, the sun or warm winds could play havoc with ice conditions throughout a championship.

== Bandy ==
Bandy has also been played at the Eisstadion. Apart from local games, the 1913 European Bandy Championships was held at the site and a four nation bandy tournament was held here in 2014.

== Ice hockey ==
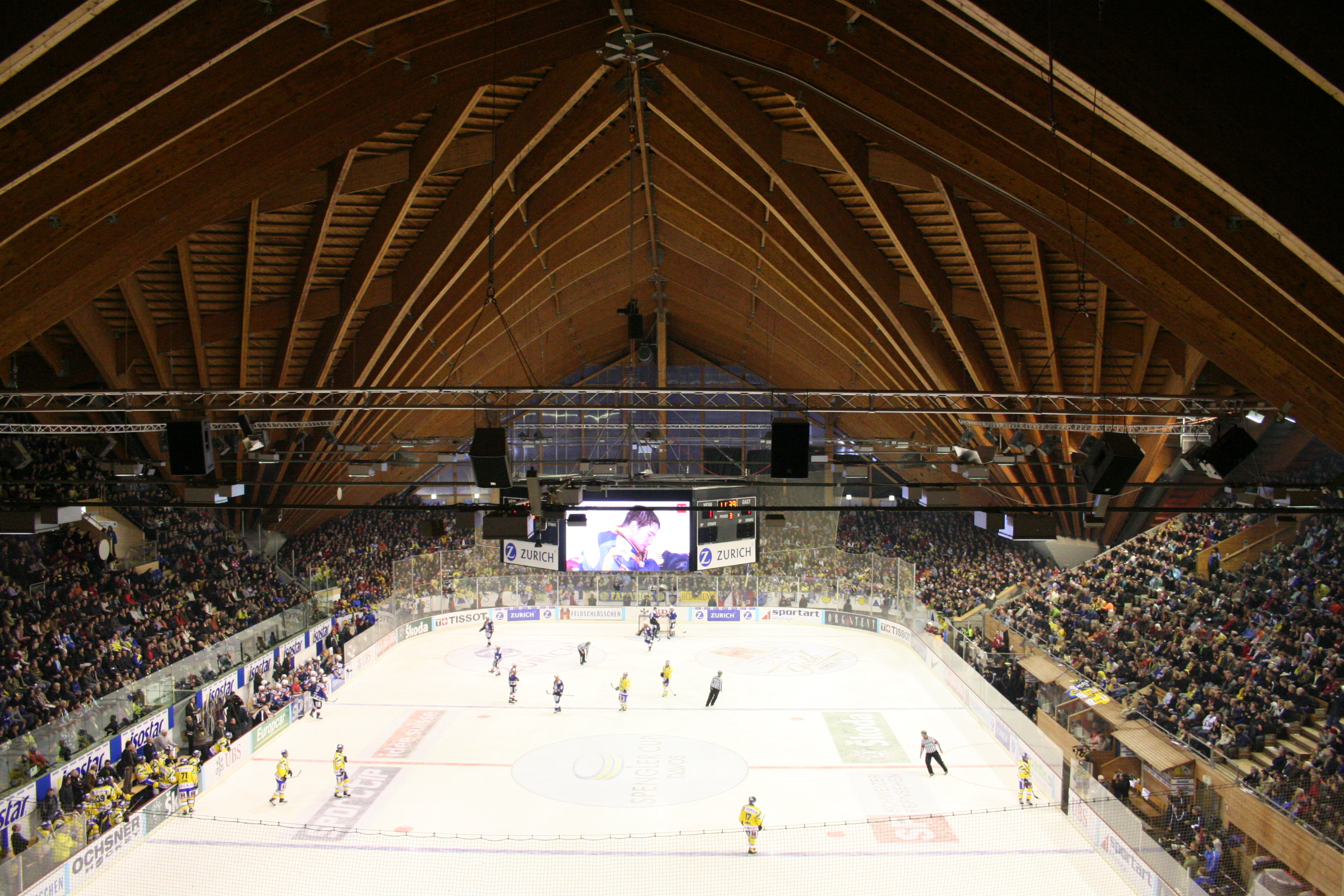
The arena during the 2006 Spengler Cup.

At the beginning of the 20th century HC Davos played home games at an outdoor ice rink. The first attempt to cover the ice rink came around 1970. Soon after work began on the wooden enclosure, the project was stopped because of a lack of funds.

In 1979, HC Davos, qualified for the Nationalliga A and a covered rink was necessary. Construction finished on the wooden structure, allowing the team to participate in the 1979/80 season. It was not until the 1981/82 season that the arena was then "closed" by glass panes.

In 1998 the west tribune was renovated and instead of a big standing area, a two-level section with plastic seats was built. At that time the arena could hold up to 7,680 people.

In summer 2005, a new, modern, tribune was built, which included the restaurant "Nordside", VIP rooms, a sector for sponsors, and new changing rooms were built in the northern sector. Capacity was subsequently reduced by the new construction to 7,080 people. The renovations continued in 2006 with small investments in the security of the southern and eastern tribune and screens for advertising.

In January 2007, the indoor ice-hockey rink was renamed "Vaillant Arena" after the Vaillant Group paid CHF 3 million to help fund future renovations.

== Hosting the World: The official representation of the Government of Switzerland in Davos ==
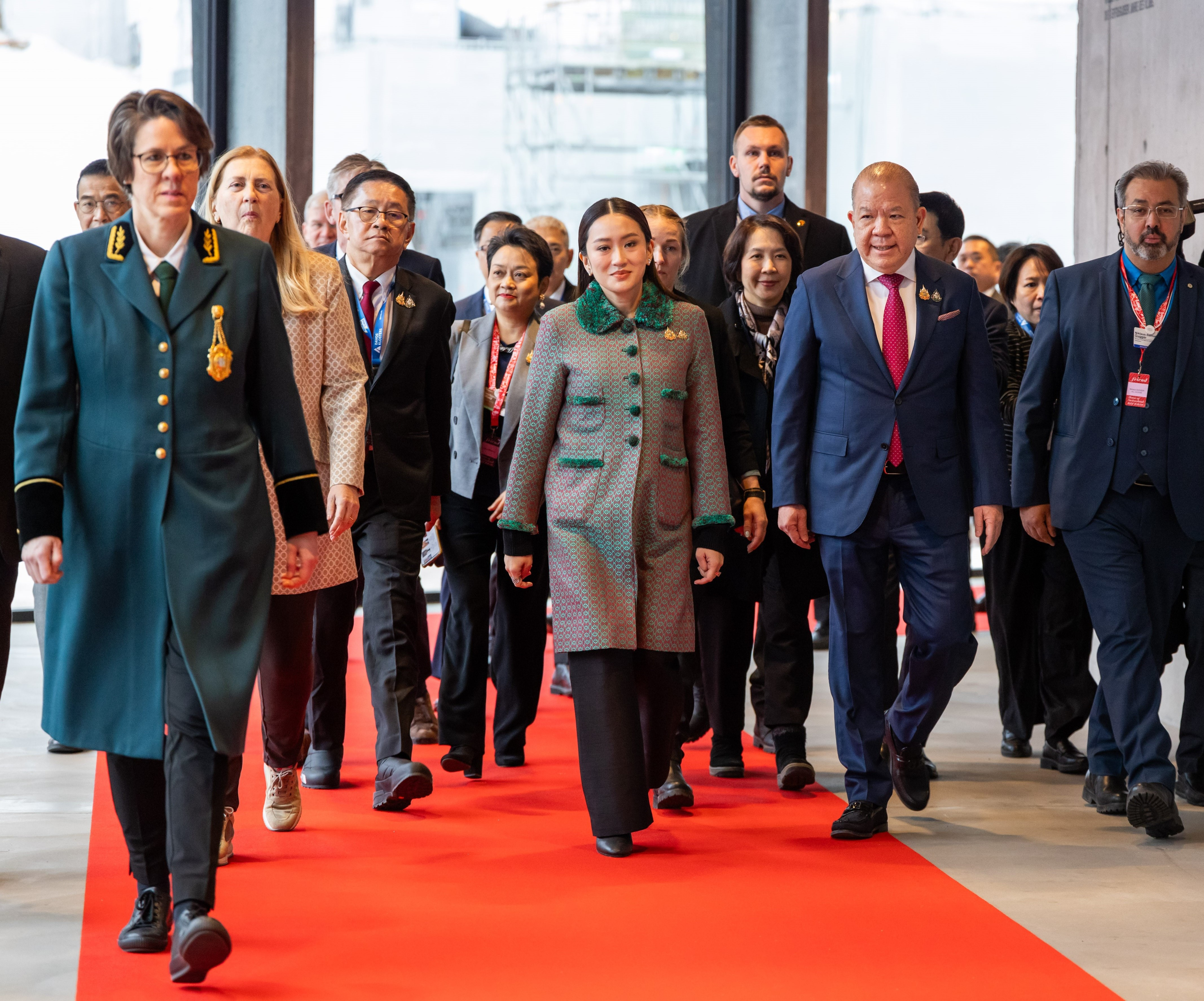
23 January 2025: The Swiss–Thai delegation headed by Prime Minister Paetongtarn Shinawatra, flanked by the Minister of Commerce, Pichai Naripthaphan, and the Swiss State Secretary Helene Budliger Artieda, at the House of Switzerland in Davos, escorted in accordance with protocol by the Federal Huissier (far left in uniform).

At its meeting on 14 June 2019, the Swiss Federal Council decided to continue and institutionalise the House of Switzerland at the World Economic Forum (WEF) Annual Meeting in Davos, which was first operated at the WEF Annual Meeting in January 2019. The House of Switzerland was officially opened on 22 January 2019 by the Federal Councillors Alain Berset, Guy Parmelin, Ueli Maurer, President of the Swiss Confederation, and Ignazio Cassis in presence of the Landammann of Davos, Tarzisius Caviezel, and the Chief executive officer (CEO) of the HC Davos, Marc Gianola. This is the only House of Switzerland institutionalised by a Federal Council resolution, the only House of Switzerland directly related to government business and the only House of Switzerland that is set up and operated at the same location every year. The premises have been located in the Eisstadion Davos since the beginning in 2019.

=== In the service of diplomacy ===
During the WEF Annual Meeting in Davos, the House of Switzerland serves as the official representation of the Swiss Federal Council. Accordingly, the House of Switzerland is popularly referred to as the Federal Palace of Davos or Chalet Fédéral. It serves as a communication and networking platform for the official Swiss delegation, consisting of the members of the Swiss Federal Council, the state secretaries, ambassadors and other high-ranking diplomats and officials as well as members of parliament and the Chairman of the Governing Board of the Swiss National Bank (SNB).

== See also ==
- List of indoor arenas in Switzerland
