= Ski jumping at the 1984 Winter Olympics – Normal hill individual =

Men's normal hill individual at the XIV Olympic Winter Games
- Pictogram for ski jumping
- Venue: Igman Olympic Jumps
- Dates: February 12, 1984
- Competitors: 58 from 17 nations
- Winning points: 215.2

Medalists
1st place, gold medalist(s)		Jens Weißflog; East Germany
2nd place, silver medalist(s)		Matti Nykänen; Finland
3rd place, bronze medalist(s)		Jari Puikkonen; Finland

The men's normal hill individual ski jumping competition for the 1984 Winter Olympics was held at Igman Olympic Jumps. It occurred on 9 February.

== Results ==
Rank	Bib	Athlete	Country	Jump 1	Jump 2	Total
1st place, gold medalist(s)	50	Jens Weißflog	East Germany	110.5	104.7	215.2
2nd place, silver medalist(s)	57	Matti Nykänen	Finland	114.1	99.9	214.0
3rd place, bronze medalist(s)	33	Jari Puikkonen	Finland	95.4	117.4	212.8
4	17	Stefan Stannarius	East Germany	99.4	111.7	211.1
5	31	Rolf Åge Berg	Norway	104.1	104.4	208.5
6	46	Andreas Felder	Austria	99.9	105.7	205.6
7	53	Piotr Fijas	Poland	103.2	101.3	204.5
8	21	Vegard Opaas	Norway	101.1	102.7	203.8
9	55	Jeff Hastings	United States	99.4	104.1	203.5
10	39	Jiří Parma	Czechoslovakia	92.6	110.1	202.7
11	36	Andi Bauer	West Germany	104.7	97.3	202.0
12	25	Pentti Kokkonen	Finland	101.4	99.9	201.3
13	34	Klaus Ostwald	East Germany	100.7	100.4	201.1
14	49	Pavel Ploc	Czechoslovakia	101.1	97.4	198.5
15	48	Gérard Colin	France	98.7	93.8	192.5
16	32	Massimo Rigoni	Italy	87.3	103.0	190.3
17	22	Vasja Bajc	Yugoslavia	94.8	95.2	190.0
18	6	Steinar Bråten	Norway	102.0	87.9	189.9
19	36	Vladimir Breychev	Bulgaria	89.3	100.1	189.4
20	10	Markku Pusenius	Finland	89.2	99.0	188.2
21	45	Lido Tomasi	Italy	101.7	86.3	188.0
22	30	Georg Waldvogel	West Germany	96.8	91.0	187.8
22	35	Masaru Nagaoka	Japan	101.0	86.8	187.8
24	38	Hans Wallner	Austria	97.8	88.9	186.7
25	16	Steve Collins	Canada	92.0	92.8	184.8
26	58	Gennady Prokopenko	Soviet Union	88.4	95.7	184.1
27	28	Miran Tepeš	Yugoslavia	92.6	90.5	183.1
28	1	Landis Arnold	United States	92.6	89.4	182.0
29	19	Ron Richards	Canada	85.6	95.3	180.9
30	13	Janusz Malik	Poland	85.8	95.0	180.8
31	37	Valery Savin	Soviet Union	81.6	97.9	179.5
32	52	Hansjörg Sumi	Switzerland	89.5	89.0	178.5
33	23	Dennis McGrane	United States	102.6	75.8	178.4
34	12	Satoru Matsuhashi	Japan	75.2	102.0	177.2
35	9	Holger Freitag	East Germany	87.8	85.7	173.5
36	11	Ernst Vettori	Austria	97.2	76.0	173.2
37	54	Valentin Bozhkov	Bulgaria	89.7	81.1	170.8
38	43	Horst Bulau	Canada	82.6	86.8	169.4
39	14	Vladimír Podzimek	Czechoslovakia	88.9	78.5	167.4
40	2	Bojan Globočnik	Yugoslavia	91.5	74.8	166.3
41	41	Mike Holland	United States	90.6	73.7	164.3
42	5	Martin Švagerko	Czechoslovakia	84.2	77.5	161.7
43	18	Sandro Sambugaro	Italy	75.5	86.1	161.6
44	27	Peter Rohwein	West Germany	94.3	66.9	161.2
45	7	Hiroo Shima	Japan	78.4	82.6	161.0
46	44	Per Bergerud	Norway	74.5	85.6	160.1
47	4	Thomas Klauser	West Germany	83.2	76.1	159.3
48	40	Christian Hauswirth	Switzerland	76.6	82.6	159.2
49	19	Angel Stoyanov	Bulgaria	74.0	83.2	157.2
50	26	Yury Golovshchikov	Soviet Union	57.6	96.9	154.5
51	8	David Brown	Canada	70.6	83.2	153.8
52	24	Armin Kogler	Austria	74.7	78.4	153.1
53	15	Fabrice Piazzini	Switzerland	76.5	76.1	152.6
54	42	José Rivera	Spain	71.5	70.0	141.5
55	47	Hirokazu Yagi	Japan	81.5	51.7	133.2
56	3	Bernat Sola	Spain	72.1	60.8	132.9
57	51	Primož Ulaga	Yugoslavia	35.4	95.5	130.9
58	20	Ángel Janiquet	Spain	58.2	63.5	121.7
