= Ski jumping at the 1984 Winter Olympics – Large hill individual =

Men's large hill individual at the XIV Olympic Winter Games
- Pictogram for ski jumping
- Venue: Igman Olympic Jumps
- Dates: February 18, 1984
- Competitors: 53 from 17 nations
- winning score: 231.2

Medalists
1st place, gold medalist(s)		Matti Nykänen; Finland
2nd place, silver medalist(s)		Jens Weißflog; East Germany
3rd place, bronze medalist(s)		Pavel Ploc; Czechoslovakia

The men's large hill individual ski jumping competition for the 1984 Winter Olympics was held in Igman Olympic Jumps. It occurred on 18 February.

== Results ==
Rank	Bib	Athlete	Country	Jump 1	Jump 2	Total
1st place, gold medalist(s)	52	Matti Nykänen	Finland	119.1	112.1	231.2
2nd place, silver medalist(s)	50	Jens Weißflog	East Germany	106.0	107.7	213.7
3rd place, bronze medalist(s)	47	Pavel Ploc	Czechoslovakia	97.1	105.8	202.9
4	41	Jeff Hastings	United States	95.7	105.5	201.2
5	32	Jari Puikkonen	Finland	100.1	96.5	196.6
6	6	Armin Kogler	Austria	103.1	92.5	195.6
7	42	Andi Bauer	West Germany	102.2	92.4	194.6
8	19	Vladimír Podzimek	Czechoslovakia	88.6	105.9	194.5
9	12	Stefan Stannarius	East Germany	95.6	93.0	188.6
10	40	Horst Bulau	Canada	94.6	93.7	188.3
11	1	Tomaž Dolar	Yugoslavia	93.8	91.9	185.7
12	7	Ladislav Dluhoš	Czechoslovakia	101.1	84.4	185.5
13	38	Primož Ulaga	Yugoslavia	89.3	95.9	185.2
14	21	Pentti Kokkonen	Finland	90.1	92.3	182.4
15	35	Vasja Bajc	Yugoslavia	99.6	81.8	181.4
16	8	Markku Pusenius	Finland	93.4	87.5	180.9
17	45	Piotr Fijas	Poland	96.9	83.7	180.6
18	23	Ole Christian Eidhammer	Norway	93.4	86.5	179.9
19	39	Hirokazu Yagi	Japan	86.8	93.0	179.8
20	17	Satoru Matsuhashi	Japan	98.6	79.0	177.6
21	5	Matthias Buse	East Germany	97.0	79.9	176.9
22	51	Hansjörg Sumi	Switzerland	88.3	88.1	176.4
23	36	Jiří Parma	Czechoslovakia	81.8	92.2	174.0
24	29	Hans Wallner	Austria	80.3	93.2	173.5
25	22	Ron Richards	Canada	79.3	93.6	172.9
26	37	Klaus Ostwald	East Germany	89.6	82.2	171.8
27	2	Vegard Opaas	Norway	89.2	81.9	171.1
28	44	Andreas Felder	Austria	80.8	89.5	170.3
29	9	Reed Zuehlke	United States	85.6	82.9	168.5
30	25	Gennady Prokopenko	Soviet Union	79.1	88.0	167.1
31	13	Ole Gunnar Fidjestøl	Norway	82.2	81.8	164.0
32	46	Gérard Colin	France	71.2	92.6	163.8
33	53	Lido Tomasi	Italy	91.9	69.4	161.3
34	28	Massimo Rigoni	Italy	78.5	80.8	159.3
35	27	Peter Rohwein	West Germany	77.7	80.7	158.4
36	15	Steve Collins	Canada	89.8	66.6	156.4
37	33	Mike Holland	United States	71.2	83.6	154.8
38	10	Georg Waldvogel	West Germany	82.7	71.8	154.5
39	49	Yury Golovchikov	Soviet Union	65.6	86.4	152.0
40	31	Fabrice Piazzini	Switzerland	74.8	76.7	151.5
41	18	Manfred Steiner	Austria	85.6	63.8	149.4
42	48	Vladimir Breychev	Bulgaria	64.2	75.5	139.7
43	24	Masaru Nagaoka	Japan	75.5	63.3	138.8
44	20	Sandro Sambugaro	Italy	68.9	69.4	138.3
45	14	Miran Tepeš	Yugoslavia	47.0	83.7	130.7
46	26	Janusz Malik	Poland	65.2	62.3	127.5
47	3	David Brown	Canada	57.1	64.5	121.6
48	11	José Rivera	Spain	63.3	50.6	113.9
49	30	Angel Stoyanov	Bulgaria	59.0	49.5	108.5
50	34	Bernat Sola	Spain	47.3	52.0	99.3
51	4	Hiroo Shima	Japan	44.4	51.5	95.9
52	43	Rolf Åge Berg	Norway	12.8	74.7	87.5
53	16	Dennis McGrane	United States	7.1	72.8	79.9
