= Speed skating at the 1984 Winter Olympics – Men's 1000 metres =

Speed skating at the Olympics

Men's 1000 metres at the XIV Olympic Winter Games
- Pictogram for speed skating
- Venue: Zetra Ice Rink
- Dates: 14 February 1984
- Competitors: 43 from 20 nations
- Winning time: 1:15.80

Medalists
1st place, gold medalist(s)		Gaétan Boucher; Canada
2nd place, silver medalist(s)		Sergey Khlebnikov; Soviet Union
3rd place, bronze medalist(s)		Kai Arne Engelstad; Norway

The men's 1000 metres in speed skating at the 1984 Winter Olympics took place on 14 February, at the Zetra Ice Rink.

== Records ==
Prior to this competition, the existing world and Olympic records were as follows:

World record	Pavel Pegov (URS)	1:12.58	Alma-Ata, Kazakh SSR, Soviet Union	25 March 1983
Olympic record	Eric Heiden (USA)	1:15.18	Lake Placid, United States	19 February 1980

== Results ==
Rank	Pair	Lane	Athlete	Country	Time	Time behind
1st place, gold medalist(s)	10	o	Gaétan Boucher	Canada	1:15.80	–
2nd place, silver medalist(s)	4	i	Sergey Khlebnikov	Soviet Union	1:16.63	+0.83
3rd place, bronze medalist(s)	5	i	Kai Arne Engelstad	Norway	1:16.75	+0.95
4	5	o	Nick Thometz	United States	1:16.85	+1.05
5	2	o	André Hoffmann	East Germany	1:17.33	+1.53
6	3	i	Viktor Shasherin	Soviet Union	1:17.42	+1.62
7	8	o	Andreas Dietel	East Germany	1:17.46	+1.66
7	8	i	Hilbert van der Duim	Netherlands	1:17.46	+1.66
9	1	o	Akira Kuroiwa	Japan	1:17.49	+1.69
10	3	o	Hein Vergeer	Netherlands	1:17.57	+1,77
11	6	o	Erik Henriksen	United States	1:17.64	+1.84
12	2	i	Jouko Vesterlund	Finland	1:18.12	+2.32
13	14	i	Pavel Pegov	Soviet Union	1:18.57	+2.77
14	12	i	Frode Rønning	Norway	1:18.64	+2.84
15	9	o	Uwe Streb	West Germany	1:18.65	+2.85
16	1	i	Dan Jansen	United States	1:18.73	+2.93
17	4	o	Kimihiro Hamaya	Japan	1:18.74	+2.94
18	22	o	Hans van Helden	France	1:18.77	+2.97
19	9	i	Jacques Thibault	Canada	1:18.79	+2.99
20	6	i	Jan Ykema	Netherlands	1:18.81	+3.01
21	10	i	Hans Magnusson	Sweden	1:18.95	+3.15
22	13	o	Michael Hadschieff	Austria	1:19.05	+3.25
23	19	i	Hans-Peter Oberhuber	West Germany	1:19.13	+3.33
23	21	i	Urpo Pikkupeura	Finland	1:19.13	+3.33
25	17	i	Uwe-Jens Mey	East Germany	1:19.14	+3.34
26	20	i	Andreas Lemcke	West Germany	1:19.39	+3.57
27	7	i	Mike Richmond	Australia	1:19.53	+3.73
28	11	o	Lee Yeong-Ha	South Korea	1:19.55	+3.75
29	11	i	Jan-Åke Carlberg	Sweden	1:19.92	+4.12
30	19	o	Na Yun-Su	South Korea	1:19.94	+4.14
31	7	o	Yoshihiro Kitazawa	Japan	1:19.95	+4.15
32	20	i	Giorgio Paganin	Italy	1:20.89	+5.09
33	16	o	Christian Eminger	Austria	1:20.98	+5.18
34	12	o	Dezideriu Jenei	Romania	1:21.14	+5.34
35	17	i	Im Ri-bin	North Korea	1:21.16	+5.36
36	18	o	Kim Song-hui	North Korea	1:22.04	+6.24
37	15	i	Chen Jianqiang	China	1:22.10	+6.30
38	22	i	Kim Hwang-hyun	North Korea	1:22.26	+6.46
39	13	i	Gai Zhiwu	China	1:24.20	+8.40
40	16	i	Wang Feifan	China	1:24.21	+8.41
41	21	o	Nenad Žvanut	Yugoslavia	1:26.63	+10.83
42	18	o	Erroll Fraser	British Virgin Islands	1:30.59	+14.79
43	15	i	Behudin Merdović	Yugoslavia	1:33.33	+20.59
