= Speed skating at the 1984 Winter Olympics – Men's 500 metres =

Speed skating at the Olympics

Men's 500 metres at the XIV Olympic Winter Games
- Pictogram for speed skating
- Venue: Zetra Ice Rink
- Dates: 10 February 1984
- Competitors: 42 from 20 nations
- Winning time: 38.19

Medalists
1st place, gold medalist(s)		Sergey Fokichev; Soviet Union
2nd place, silver medalist(s)		Yoshihiro Kitazawa; Japan
3rd place, bronze medalist(s)		Gaétan Boucher; Canada

The men's 500 metres in speed skating at the 1984 Winter Olympics took place on 10 February, at the Zetra Ice Rink.

== Records ==
Prior to this competition, the existing world and Olympic records were as follows:

World record	Pavel Pegov (URS)	36.57	Alma-Ata, Kazakh SSR, Soviet Union	26 March 1983
Olympic record	Eric Heiden (USA)	38.03	Lake Placid, United States	15 February 1980

== Results ==
Rank	Pair	Lane	Athlete	Country	Time
1st place, gold medalist(s)	1	o	Sergey Fokichev	Soviet Union	38.19
2nd place, silver medalist(s)	5	i	Yoshihiro Kitazawa	Japan	38.30
3rd place, bronze medalist(s)	7	i	Gaétan Boucher	Canada	38.39
4	6	i	Dan Jansen	United States	38.55
5	1	i	Nick Thometz	United States	38.56
6	4	o	Vladimir Kozlov	Soviet Union	38.57
7	6	o	Frode Rønning	Norway	38.58
8	2	o	Uwe-Jens Mey	East Germany	38.65
9	16	o	Aleksandr Danilin	Soviet Union	38.66
10	4	i	Akira Kuroiwa	Japan	38.70
11	7	o	André Hoffmann	East Germany	38.87
12	9	o	Yasushi Suzuki	Japan	38.92
13	10	i	Hein Vergeer	Netherlands	38.94
14	3	i	Jan Ykema	Netherlands	39.03
15	9	i	Jacques Thibault	Canada	39.12
16	2	i	Geert Kuiper	Netherlands	39.13
17	5	o	Jouko Vesterlund	Finland	39.15
18	10	o	Kai Arne Engelstad	Norway	39.28
19	14	o	Hans-Peter Oberhuber	West Germany	39.39
20	22	o	Andreas Dietel	East Germany	39.45
20	3	o	Erik Henriksen	United States	39.45
22	8	i	Mike Richmond	Australia	39.47
23	17	i	Rolf Falk-Larssen	Norway	39.57
24	14	i	Hans van Helden	France	39.71
25	19	i	Dezideriu Jenei	Romania	39.72
26	11	i	Uwe Streb	West Germany	39.78
27	20	i	Urpo Pikkupeura	Finland	39.88
28	11	i	Lee Yeong-Ha	South Korea	39.90
29	17	i	Chen Jianqiang	China	40.30
29	13	i	Daniel Turcotte	Canada	40.30
31	15	o	Na Yun-Su	South Korea	40.35
32	20	o	Michael Hadschieff	Austria	40.52
33	18	i	Giorgio Paganin	Italy	40.54
34	8	o	Jan-Åke Carlberg	Sweden	40.64
35	13	o	Wang Nianchun	China	40.75
36	16	i	Tomas Gustafson	Sweden	41.18
37	19	o	Kim Song-hui	North Korea	41.23
38	15	i	Gai Zhiwu	China	41.67
39	21	i	Nenad Žvanut	Yugoslavia	42.55
40	21	o	Erroll Fraser	British Virgin Islands	43.47
41	18	o	Behudin Merdović	Yugoslavia	46.34
42	12	i	Hans Magnusson	Sweden	63.08
