= Japan at the 1984 Winter Olympics =

- IOC code: JPN
- NOC: Japanese Olympic Committee
- Website: www.joc.or.jp (in Japanese and English)

in Sarajevo
- Competitors: 39 (32 men, 7 women) in 9 sports
- Flag bearer: Tadayuki Takahashi (figure skating)
- Medals Ranked 14th: Gold 0 Silver 1 Bronze 0 Total 1

Winter Olympics appearances (overview)
- 1928; 1932; 1936; 1948; 1952; 1956; 1960; 1964; 1968; 1972; 1976; 1980; 1984; 1988; 1992; 1994; 1998; 2002; 2006; 2010; 2014; 2018; 2022; 2026

Japan competed at the 1984 Winter Olympics in Sarajevo, Yugoslavia.

== Medalists ==
| Medal | Name | Sport | Event | Date |
|---|---|---|---|---|
| Silver | Yoshihiro Kitazawa | Speed skating | Men's 500 metres | 10 February |

== Alpine skiing ==
Men

| Athlete | Event | Race 1 | | Race 2 | | Total | |
| Athlete | Event | Time | Rank | Time | Rank | Time | Rank |
|---|---|---|---|---|---|---|---|
| Shinya Chiba | Downhill | | | | | 1:49.02 | 28 |
| Shinya Chiba | Giant Slalom | 1:25.67 | 29 | 1:27.51 | 31 | 2:53.18 | 30 |
| Naomine Iwaya | Giant Slalom | 1:25.02 | 28 | 1:24.67 | 24 | 2:49.69 | 25 |
| Toshihiro Kaiwa | Giant Slalom | 1:24.92 | 27 | 1:25.05 | 26 | 2:49.97 | 26 |
| Osamu Kodama | Giant Slalom | 1:24.81 | 25 | 1:25.40 | 27 | 2:50.21 | 27 |
| Naomine Iwaya | Slalom | DNF | – | – | – | DNF | – |
| Toshihiro Kaiwa | Slalom | 53.61 | 20 | 50.26 | 12 | 1:43.87 | 12 |
| Osamu Kodama | Slalom | 53.42 | 16 | DSQ | – | DSQ | – |

== Biathlon ==
Men

| Event | Athlete | Misses ^{1} | Time | Rank |
|---|---|---|---|---|
| 10 km Sprint | Isao Yamase | 4 | 35:57.0 | 47 |
| 10 km Sprint | Yoshinobu Murase | 3 | 35:35.9 | 43 |
| 10 km Sprint | Shoichi Kinoshita | 1 | 34:12.2 | 30 |

| Event | Athlete | Time | Penalties | Adjusted time ^{2} | Rank |
|---|---|---|---|---|---|
| 20 km | Isao Yamase | 1'18:09.6 | 7 | 1'25:09.6 | 42 |
| 20 km | Shoichi Kinoshita | 1'16:49.8 | 7 | 1'23:49.8 | 39 |
| 20 km | Yoshinobu Murase | 1'17:39.1 | 6 | 1'23:39.1 | 38 |

Men's 4 x 7.5 km relay

| Athletes | Race | | |
| Athletes | Misses ^{1} | Time | Rank |
|---|---|---|---|
| Isao Yamase; Shoichi Kinoshita; Yoshinobu Murase; Hiroyuki Deguchi | 1 | 1'51:43.1 | 15 |

^{1} A penalty loop of 150 metres had to be skied per missed target.
^{2} One minute added per missed target.

== Bobsleigh ==
| Sled | Athletes | Event | Run 1 | | Run 2 | | Run 3 | | Run 4 | | Total | |
| Sled | Athletes | Event | Time | Rank | Time | Rank | Time | Rank | Time | Rank | Time | Rank |
|---|---|---|---|---|---|---|---|---|---|---|---|---|
| JPN-1 | Hiroshi Okachi; Yuji Yaku | Two-man | 53.29 | 20 | 53.37 | 19 | 53.15 | 23 | 53.15 | 20 | 3:32.96 | 20 |
| JPN-2 | Yuji Funayama; Satoshi Sugawara | Two-man | 54.52 | 26 | 54.23 | 27 | 53.50 | 26 | 53.88 | 27 | 3:36.13 | 27 |

| Sled | Athletes | Event | Run 1 | | Run 2 | | Run 3 | | Run 4 | | Total | |
| Sled | Athletes | Event | Time | Rank | Time | Rank | Time | Rank | Time | Rank | Time | Rank |
|---|---|---|---|---|---|---|---|---|---|---|---|---|
| JPN-1 | Hiroshi Okachi; Yuji Yaku; Yuji Funayama; Satoshi Sugawara | Four-man | 51.97 | 24 | 52.01 | 23 | 52.40 | 24 | 52.37 | 23 | 3:28.75 | 24 |

== Cross-country skiing ==
Men

| Event | Athlete | Race | |
| Event | Athlete | Time | Rank |
|---|---|---|---|
| 15 km | Yusei Nakazawa | 46:38.6 | 56 |
| 15 km | Satoshi Sato | 46:25.5 | 50 |
| 15 km | Kazunari Sasaki | 46:04.8 | 47 |
| 15 km | Hideaki Yamada | 45:42.3 | 43 |
| 50 km | Kazunari Sasaki | DNF | – |
| 50 km | Satoshi Sato | 2'39:43.1 | 47 |

Men's 4 × 10 km relay

| Athletes | Race | |
| Athletes | Time | Rank |
|---|---|---|
| Kazunari Sasaki; Hideaki Yamada; Satoshi Sato; Yusei Nakazawa | 2'06:42.5 | 13 |

== Figure skating ==
Men

| Athlete | CF | SP | FS | TFP | Rank |
|---|---|---|---|---|---|
| Masaru Ogawa | 16 | 14 | 14 | 29.2 | 14 |

Women

| Athlete | CF | SP | FS | TFP | Rank |
|---|---|---|---|---|---|
| Masako Kato | 21 | 18 | 19 | 38.8 | 19 |

Ice Dancing

| Athletes | CD | OD | FD | TFP | Rank |
|---|---|---|---|---|---|
| Noriko Sato; Tadayuki Takahashi | 16 | 16 | 17 | 33.0 | 17 |

== Luge ==
Men

| Athlete | Run 1 | | Run 2 | | Run 3 | | Run 4 | | Total | |
| Athlete | Time | Rank | Time | Rank | Time | Rank | Time | Rank | Time | Rank |
|---|---|---|---|---|---|---|---|---|---|---|
| Takashi Takagi | 48.402 | 25 | 47.527 | 18 | 47.877 | 26 | 47.329 | 17 | 3:11.135 | 20 |
| Tsukasa Hirakawa | 47.732 | 22 | 48.015 | 24 | 47.776 | 21 | 48.241 | 26 | 3:11.764 | 24 |

(Men's) Doubles

| Athletes | Run 1 | | Run 2 | | Total | |
| Athletes | Time | Rank | Time | Rank | Time | Rank |
|---|---|---|---|---|---|---|
| Takashi Takagi; Tsukasa Hirakawa | 43.047 | 12 | 42.980 | 12 | 1:26.027 | 12 |

Women

| Athlete | Run 1 | | Run 2 | | Run 3 | | Run 4 | | Total | |
| Athlete | Time | Rank | Time | Rank | Time | Rank | Time | Rank | Time | Rank |
|---|---|---|---|---|---|---|---|---|---|---|
| Yumiko Kato | 43.752 | 20 | 43.556 | 20 | 53.210 | 26 | DSQ | – | DSQ | – |
| Hitomi Koshimizu | 43.696 | 19 | 43.929 | 23 | 43.508 | 18 | 43.243 | 20 | 2:54.376 | 18 |

== Nordic combined ==
Events:

- normal hill ski jumping (Three jumps, best two counted and shown here.)
- 15 km cross-country skiing

| Athlete | Event | Ski Jumping | | | | Cross-country | | | Total | |
| Athlete | Event | Distance 1 | Distance 2 | Points | Rank | Time | Points | Rank | Points | Rank |
|---|---|---|---|---|---|---|---|---|---|---|
| Takahiro Tanaka | Individual | 79.5 | 87.0 | 198.6 | 14 | 51:01.5 | 179.575 | 21 | 378.175 | 20 |
| Toshiaki Maruyama | Individual | 77.0 | 81.5 | 179.4 | 25 | 49:24.9 | 194.065 | 11 | 373.465 | 21 |

== Ski jumping ==
| Athlete | Event | Jump 1 | | Jump 2 | | Total | |
| Athlete | Event | Distance | Points | Distance | Points | Points | Rank |
|---|---|---|---|---|---|---|---|
| Satoru Matsuhashi | Normal hill | 72.0 | 75.2 | 85.0 | 102.0 | 177.2 | 34 |
| Hiroo Shima | Normal hill | 74.0 | 78.4 | 76.0 | 82.6 | 161.0 | 45 |
| Hirokazu Yagi | Normal hill | 75.0 | 81.5 | 62.0 | 51.7 | 133.2 | 55 |
| Masaru Nagaoka | Normal hill | 85.0 | 101.0 | 78.0 | 86.8 | 187.8 | 22 |
| Hiroo shima | Large hill | 78.0 | 44.4 | 77.0 | 51.5 | 95.9 | 51 |
| Masaru Nagaoka | Large hill | 92.0 | 75.5 | 84.0 | 63.3 | 138.8 | 43 |
| Hirokazu Yagi | Large hill | 96.5 | 86.8 | 99.5 | 93.0 | 179.8 | 19 |
| Satoru Matsuhashi | Large hill | 103.5 | 98.6 | 92.0 | 79.0 | 177.6 | 20 |

== Speed skating ==
Men

| Event | Athlete | Race | |
| Event | Athlete | Time | Rank |
|---|---|---|---|
| 500 m | Yasushi Suzuki | 38.92 | 12 |
| 500 m | Akira Kuroiwa | 38.70 | 10 |
| 500 m | Yoshihiro Kitazawa | 38.30 | 2nd place, silver medalist(s) |
| 1000 m | Yoshihiro Kitazawa | 1:19.95 | 31 |
| 1000 m | Kimihiro Hamaya | 1:18.74 | 17 |
| 1000 m | Akira Kuroiwa | 1:17.49 | 9 |
| 1500 m | Kimihiro Hamaya | 2:03.72 | 29 |
| 5000 m | Toshiaki Imamura | 7:38.16 | 26 |
| 5000 m | Masahito Shinohara | 7:37.94 | 24 |
| 10,000 m | Masahito Shinohara | 15:31.70 | 26 |
| 10,000 m | Toshiaki Imamura | 15:23.37 | 23 |

Women

| Event | Athlete | Race | |
| Event | Athlete | Time | Rank |
|---|---|---|---|
| 500 m | Shoko Fusano | 43.75 | 22 |
| 500 m | Hiromi Ozawa | 46.46 | 16 |
| 500 m | Seiko Hashimoto | 42.99 | 11 |
| 1000 m | Hiromi Ozawa | 1:29.20 | 27 |
| 1000 m | Shoko Fusano | 1:28.19 | 22 |
| 1000 m | Seiko Hashimoto | 1:26.69 | 12 |
| 1500 m | Seiko Hashimoto | 2:12.56 | 15 |
| 3000 m | Seiko Hashimoto | 4:53.38 | 19 |
