= Speed skating at the 1984 Winter Olympics – Men's 5000 metres =

Speed skating at the Olympics

Men's 5000 metres at the XIV Olympic Winter Games
- Pictogram for speed skating
- Venue: Zetra Ice Rink
- Dates: 12 February 1984
- Competitors: 42 from 20 nations
- Winning time: 7:12.28

Medalists
1st place, gold medalist(s)		Tomas Gustafson; Sweden
2nd place, silver medalist(s)		Igor Malkov; Soviet Union
3rd place, bronze medalist(s)		René Schöfisch; East Germany

The men's 5000 metres in speed skating at the 1984 Winter Olympics took place on 12 February, at the Zetra Ice Rink.

== Records ==
Prior to this competition, the existing world and Olympic records were as follows:

World record	Aleksandr Baranov (URS)	6:54.66	Alma-Ata, Kazakh SSR, Soviet Union	18 March 1982
Olympic record	Eric Heiden (USA)	7:02.29	Lake Placid, United States	16 February 1980

== Results ==
Rank	Pair	Lane	Athlete	Country	Time	Time behind
1st place, gold medalist(s)	1	i	Tomas Gustafson	Sweden	7:12.28	-
2nd place, silver medalist(s)	4	i	Igor Malkov	Soviet Union	7:12.30	+0.02
3rd place, bronze medalist(s)	7	i	René Schöfisch	East Germany	7:17.49	+5.21
4	4	o	Andreas Ehrig	East Germany	7:17.63	+5.35
5	3	i	Oleg Bozhev	Soviet Union	7:17.96	+5.68
6	12	o	Pertti Niittylä	Finland	7:17.97	+5.69
7	2	o	Bjørn Nyland	Norway	7:18.27	+5.99
8	7	o	Werner Jäger	Austria	7:18.61	+6.33
9	1	o	Hilbert van der Duim	Netherlands	7:19.39	+7.11
10	3	o	Geir Karlstad	Norway	7:20.24	+7.96
11	10	o	Hans van Helden	France	7:24.59	+12.31
12	11	o	Mike Woods	United States	7:24.81	+12.53
13	9	o	Michael Hadschieff	Austria	7:25.07	+12.79
14	8	o	Robert Vunderink	Netherlands	7:25.19	+12.91
15	5	o	Rolf Falk-Larssen	Norway	7:25.54	+13.26
16	8	i	Claes Bengtsson	Sweden	7:26.57	+14.29
17	6	i	Frits Schalij	Netherlands	7:28.17	+15.89
18	5	i	Jan Junell	Sweden	7:29.98	+17.70
19	12	i	Tibor Kopacz	Romania	7:32.69	+20.41
20	13	i	Heinz Steinberger	Austria	7:32.72	+20.44
21	17	o	Mark Mitchell	United States	7:34.32	+22.04
22	11	i	Maurizio Marchetto	Italy	7:36.87	+24.59
23	17	i	Im Ri-Bin	North Korea	7:37.49	+25.21
24	10	o	Masahito Shinohara	Japan	7:37.94	+25.66
25	14	o	Colin Coates	Australia	7:38.08	+25.80
26	15	i	Toshiaki Imamura	Japan	7:38.16	+25.88
27	15	o	Lee Yeong-Ha	South Korea	7:39.17	+26.89
28	20	i	Wolfgang Scharf	West Germany	7:40.90	+28.62
29	9	i	Andreas Lemcke	West Germany	7:41.69	+29.41
30	14	i	Na Yun-Su	South Korea	7:42.45	+30.17
31	20	o	Jean-Noël Fagot	France	7:44.60	+32.32
32	2	i	Sergey Berezin	Soviet Union	7:45.94 f	+33.66
33	16	i	Kim Hwang-Hyun	North Korea	7:46.12	+33.84
34	16	o	Zhao Shijian	China	7:46.68	+34.40
35	18	i	Mark Huck	United States	7:46.91	+34.63
36	6	o	Benoît Lamarche	Canada	7:47.25	+34.97
37	19	o	Hansjörg Baltes	West Germany	7:50.33	+38.05
38	21	o	Jean Pichette	Canada	7:50.39	+38.11
39	13	o	Bae Ki-Tae	South Korea	7:50.82	+38.54
40	18	o	Li Wei	China	7:55.70	+43.42
41	19	i	Bryan Carbis	Great Britain	8:01.44	+49.16
DSQ	21	i	Behudin Merdović	Yugoslavia	dsq [9:00.13]	–
