= Speed skating at the 1984 Winter Olympics – Men's 10,000 metres =

Speed skating at the Olympics

Men's 10,000 metres at the XIV Olympic Winter Games
- Pictogram for speed skating
- Venue: Zetra Ice Rink
- Dates: 18 February 1984
- Competitors: 32 from 17 nations
- Winning time: 14:39.90

Medalists
1st place, gold medalist(s)		Igor Malkov; Soviet Union
2nd place, silver medalist(s)		Tomas Gustafson; Sweden
3rd place, bronze medalist(s)		René Schöfisch; East Germany

The men's 10,000 metres in speed skating at the 1984 Winter Olympics took place on 18 February, at the Zetra Ice Rink.

== Records ==
Prior to this competition, the existing world and Olympic records were as follows:

World record	Tomas Gustafson (SWE)	14:23.59	Oslo, Norway	31 January 1982
Olympic record	Eric Heiden (USA)	14:28.13	Lake Placid, United States	23 February 1980

== Results ==
Rank	Pair	Lane	Athlete	Country	Time	Time behind
1st place, gold medalist(s)	4	o	Igor Malkov	Soviet Union	14:39.90	-
2nd place, silver medalist(s)	2	i	Tomas Gustafson	Sweden	14:39.95	+0.05
3rd place, bronze medalist(s)	3	i	René Schöfisch	East Germany	14:46.91	+7.01
4	2	o	Geir Karlstad	Norway	14:52.40	+12.50
5	9	i	Michael Hadschieff	Austria	14:53.78	+13.88
6	6	i	Dmitry Bochkaryov	Soviet Union	14:55.65	+15.75
7	11	o	Mike Woods	United States	14:57.30	+17.40
8	3	o	Henry Nilsen	Norway	14:57.81	+17.91
9	7	o	Yep Kramer	Netherlands	14:59.89	+19.99
10	1	o	Hilbert van der Duim	Netherlands	15:01.24	+21.34
11	9	o	Andreas Ehrig	East Germany	15:03.76	+23.86
12	7	i	Werner Jäger	Austria	15:07.59	+27.69
13	4	i	Bjørn Nyland	Norway	15:08.34	+28.44
14	5	i	Konstantin Korotkov	Soviet Union	15:11.10	+31.20
15	11	i	Jan Junell	Sweden	15:12.90	+33.00
16	1	i	Claes Bengtsson	Sweden	15:14.33	+34.43
17	5	o	Robert Vunderink	Netherlands	15:14.45	+34.55
18	15	i	Pertti Niittylä	Finland	15:15.18	+35.28
19	16	o	Heinz Steinberger	Austria	15:18.19	+38.29
20	8	o	Maurizio Marchetto	Italy	15:19.77	+39.27
21	12	i	Mark Mitchell	United States	15:21.24	+41.34
22	12	o	Colin Coates	Australia	15:21.73	+41.83
23	16	i	Toshiaki Imamura	Japan	15:23.37	+43.47
24	15	o	Tibor Kopacz	Romania	15:23.95	+44.05
25	11	i	Hans van Helden	France	15:26.10	+46.20
26	6	o	Masahito Shinohara	Japan	15:31.70	+51.80
27	14	o	Lee Yeong-Ha	South Korea	15:34.48	+54.58
28	8	i	Wolfgang Scharf	West Germany	15:40.74	+1:00.84
29	14	i	Im Ri-Bin	North Korea	15:45.19	+1:05.29
30	12	o	Zhao Shijian	China	15:46.37	+1:06.47
31	13	i	Jean-Noël Fagot	France	15:59.65	+1:19.75
32	10	o	Andreas Dietel	East Germany	16:01.89	+1:21.99
