= Soviet Union at the 1984 Winter Olympics =

- Flag of the Soviet Union
- IOC code: URS
- NOC: Soviet Olympic Committee

in Sarajevo
- Competitors: 99 (74 men, 25 women) in 10 sports
- Flag bearer: Vladislav Tretiak (ice hockey)
- Medals Ranked 2nd: Gold 6 Silver 10 Bronze 9 Total 25

Winter Olympics appearances (overview)
- 1956; 1960; 1964; 1968; 1972; 1976; 1980; 1984; 1988

Other related appearances
- Latvia (1924–1936, 1992–pres.); Estonia (1928–1936, 1992–pres.); Lithuania (1928, 1992–pres.); Unified Team (1992); Armenia (1994–pres.); Belarus (1994–2022); Georgia (1994–pres.); Kazakhstan (1994–pres.); Kyrgyzstan (1994–pres.); Moldova (1994–pres.); Russia (1994–2014); Ukraine (1994–pres.); Uzbekistan (1994–pres.); Azerbaijan (1998–pres.); Tajikistan (2002–pres.); Olympic Athletes from Russia (2018); ROC (2022); Individual Neutral Athletes (2026)

The Soviet Union (USSR) competed at the 1984 Winter Olympics in Sarajevo, Yugoslavia.

== Medalists ==
Medal	Name	Sport	Event
Gold	Dmitry Vasilyev; Juri Kashkarov; Algimantas Šalna; Sergei Bulygin	Biathlon	Men's 4 x 7,5 km relay
Gold	Nikolay Zimyatov	Cross-country skiing	Men's 30 km
Gold	Elena Valova; Oleg Vasiliev	Figure skating	Pairs
Gold	Soviet Union men's national ice hockey team: Vladislav Tretyak; Zinetula Biljaletdinov; Sergei Chepelev; Nikolai Drozdetski; Viacheslav Fetisov; Aleksandr Gerasimov; Alexei Kasatonov; Andrei Komutov; Vladimir Kovin; Aleksandr Kozhevnikov; Vladimir Krutov; Igor Larionov; Sergei Makarov; Vladimir Myshkin; Vasili Pervukhine; Aleksandr Skvortsov; Sergei Starikov; Igor Stelnov; Viktor Tumenev; Mikhail Vasiliev	Ice hockey	Men's competition
Gold	Sergey Fokichev	Speed skating	Men's 500m
Gold	Igor Malkov	Speed skating	Men's 10,000m
Silver	Aleksandr Zavyalov	Cross-country skiing	Men's 30 km
Silver	Aleksandr Batyuk; Aleksandr Zavyalov; Vladimir Nikitin; Nikolay Zimyatov	Cross-country skiing	Men's 4 × 10 km relay
Silver	Raisa Smetanina	Cross-country skiing	Women's 10 km
Silver	Raisa Smetanina	Cross-country skiing	Women's 20 km
Silver	Natalia Bestemianova; Andrei Bukin	Figure skating	Ice dancing
Silver	Sergey Danilin	Luge	Men's individual
Silver	Yevgeny Belousov; Aleksandr Belyakov	Luge	Men's doubles
Silver	Sergey Khlebnikov	Speed skating	Men's 1000m
Silver	Sergey Khlebnikov	Speed skating	Men's 1500m
Silver	Igor Malkov	Speed skating	Men's 5000m
Bronze	Zintis Ekmanis; Vladimir Aleksandrov	Bobsleigh	Two-man
Bronze	Kira Ivanova	Figure skating	Women's singles
Bronze	Larisa Selezneva; Oleg Makarov	Figure skating	Pairs
Bronze	Marina Klimova; Sergei Ponomarenko	Figure skating	Ice dancing
Bronze	Valery Dudin	Luge	Men's individual
Bronze	Oleg Bozhev	Speed skating	Men's 1500m
Bronze	Nataliya Shive-Glebova	Speed skating	Women's 500m
Bronze	Nataliya Petrusyova	Speed skating	Women's 1000m
Bronze	Nataliya Petrusyova	Speed skating	Women's 1500m

== Alpine skiing ==
Men

Athlete	Event	Race 1		Race 2		Total	
Athlete	Event	Time	Rank	Time	Rank	Time	Rank
Valeri Tsyganov	Downhill					1:48.46	23
Vladimir Makeev	Downhill					1:47.87	16
Vladimir Andreyev	Giant Slalom	1:24.53	23	DNF	–	DNF	–
Vladimir Andreyev	Slalom	54.01	21	DNF	–	DNF	–

Women

Athlete	Event	Race 1		Race 2		Total	
Athlete	Event	Time	Rank	Time	Rank	Time	Rank
Nadezhda Andreyeva	Giant Slalom	1:12.46	35	1:14.39	27	2:26.85	29
Nadezhda Andreyeva	Slalom	50.80	18	49.42	13		

== Biathlon ==
Men

Event	Athlete	Misses ^{1}	Time	Rank
10 km Sprint	Sergei Bulygin	1	32:19.1	11
10 km Sprint	Juri Kashkarov	2	32:15.2	10
10 km Sprint	Algimantas Šalna	2	31:20.8	5

Event	Athlete	Time	Penalties	Adjusted time ^{2}	Rank
20 km	Juri Kashkarov	1'11:53.8	11	1'22:53.8	35
20 km	Dmitry Vasilyev	1'14:09.2	8	1'22:09.2	32
20 km	Sergei Bulygin	1'12:28.0	7	1'19:28.0	17

Men's 4 x 7.5 km relay

Athletes	Race		
Athletes	Misses ^{1}	Time	Rank
Dmitry Vasilyev; Juri Kashkarov; Algimantas Šalna; Sergei Bulygin	2	1'38:51.7	1st place, gold medalist(s)

== Bobsleigh ==
Sled	Athletes	Event	Run 1		Run 2		Run 3		Run 4		Total	
Sled	Athletes	Event	Time	Rank	Time	Rank	Time	Rank	Time	Rank	Time	Rank
URS-1	Jānis Ķipurs; Aivars Šnepsts	Two-man	52.06	5	51.92	1	51.30	4	51.14	2	3:26.42	4
URS-2	Zintis Ekmanis; Vladimir Aleksandrov	Two-man	51.56	2	52.10	4	51.24	3	51.26	3	3:26.16	3rd place, bronze medalist(s)

Sled	Athletes	Event	Run 1		Run 2		Run 3		Run 4		Total	
Sled	Athletes	Event	Time	Rank	Time	Rank	Time	Rank	Time	Rank	Time	Rank
URS-1	Jānis Ķipurs; Māris Poikāns; Ivars Bērzups; Aivars Šnepsts	Four-man	50.19	4	50.96	7	51.19	9	51.17	6	3:23.51	6
URS-2	Zintis Ekmanis; Jānis Skrastiņš; Rihards Kotāns; Vladimir Aleksandrov	Four-man	51.08	14	51.36	15	51.28	11	51.48	13	3:25.20	12

== Cross-country skiing ==
Men

Event	Athlete	Race	
Event	Athlete	Time	Rank
15 km	Aleksandr Zavyalov	42:59.0	16
15 km	Aleksandr Batyuk	42:42.2	10
15 km	Nikolay Zimyatov	42:34.5	6
15 km	Vladimir Nikitin	42:31.6	5
30 km	Yury Burlakov	1'32:19.6	11
30 km	Vladimir Sakhnov	1'30:30.4	4
30 km	Aleksandr Zavyalov	1'29:23.3	2nd place, silver medalist(s)
30 km	Nikolay Zimyatov	1'28:56.3	1st place, gold medalist(s)
50 km	Aleksandr Batyuk	2'23:17.0	16
50 km	Nikolay Zimyatov	2'22:15.0	13
50 km	Vladimir Sakhnov	2'20:53.7	8
50 km	Aleksandr Zavyalov	2'20:27.6	7

Men's 4 × 10 km relay

Athletes	Race	
Athletes	Time	Rank
Aleksandr Batyuk; Aleksandr Zavyalov; Vladimir Nikitin; Nikolay Zimyatov	1'55:16.5	2nd place, silver medalist(s)

Women

Event	Athlete	Race	
Event	Athlete	Time	Rank
5 km	Liliya Vasilchenko	18:07.6	17
5 km	Nadezhda Buryakova	17:58.7	14
5 km	Yuliya Stepanova	17:53.5	12
5 km	Raisa Smetanina	17:52.0	11
10 km	Lyubov Lyadova	33:05.8	12
10 km	Nadezhda Burlakova	32:55.8	9
10 km	Yuliya Stepanova	32:45.7	8
10 km	Raisa Smetanina	32:02.9	2nd place, silver medalist(s)
20 km	Yuliya Stepanova	1'05:33.4	15
20 km	Tamara Markashanskaya	1'05:01.7	13
20 km	Lyubov Lyadova	1'03:53.3	7
20 km	Raisa Smetanina	1'02:26.7	2nd place, silver medalist(s)

Women's 4 × 5 km relay

Athletes	Race	
Athletes	Time	Rank
Yuliya Stepanova; Lyubov Lyadova; Nadezhda Burlakova; Raisa Smetanina	1'07:55.0	4

== Figure skating ==
Men

Athlete	CF	SP	FS	TFP	Rank
Vladimir Kotin	11	9	6	16.2	8
Alexander Fadeev	5	8	7	13.2	7

Women

Athlete	CF	SP	FS	TFP	Rank
Elena Vodorezova	2	8	11	15.4	8
Anna Kondrashova	7	4	6	11.8	5
Kira Ivanova	5	3	5	9.2	3rd place, bronze medalist(s)

Pairs

Athletes	SP	FS	TFP	Rank
Marina Avstriyskaya; Yuri Kvashnin	7	9	12.5	9
Larisa Selezneva; Oleg Makarov	2	3	4.0	3rd place, bronze medalist(s)
Elena Valova; Oleg Vasiliev	1	1	1.5	1st place, gold medalist(s)

Ice Dancing

Athletes	CD	OD	FD	TFP	Rank
Olga Volozhinskaya; Alexander Svinin	8	7	7	14.4	7
Marina Klimova; Sergei Ponomarenko	4	4	3	7.0	3rd place, bronze medalist(s)
Natalia Bestemianova; Andrei Bukin	2	2	2	4.0	2nd place, silver medalist(s)

== Ice hockey ==
=== First round ===
Top two teams (shaded ones) advanced to the medal round.

Team	Pld	W	L	T	GF	GA	Pts
Soviet Union	5	5	0	0	42	5	10
Sweden	5	3	1	1	34	15	7
West Germany	5	3	1	1	27	17	7
Poland	5	1	4	0	16	37	2
Italy	5	1	4	0	15	31	2
Yugoslavia	5	1	4	0	8	37	2

- USSR 12-1 Poland
- USSR 5-1 Italy
- USSR 9-1 Yugoslavia
- USSR 6-1 West Germany
- USSR 10-1 Sweden

=== Medal round ===
Team	Pld	W	L	T	GF	GA	Pts
Soviet Union (gold)	3	3	0	0	16	1	6
Czechoslovakia	3	2	1	0	6	2	4
Sweden	3	1	2	0	3	12	2
Canada	3	0	3	0	0	10	0

- USSR 4-0 Canada
- USSR 2-0 Czechoslovakia

Carried over group match:

- USSR 10-1 Sweden

Gold:
Vladislav Tretyak
Zinetula Biljaletdinov
Sergei Chepelev
Nikolai Drozdetski
Viacheslav Fetisov
Aleksandr Gerasimov
Alexei Kasatonov
Andrei Komutov
Vladimir Kovin
Aleksandr Kozhevnikov
Vladimir Krutov
Igor Larionov
Sergei Makarov
Vladimir Myshkin
Vasili Pervukhine
Aleksandr Skvortsov
Sergei Starikov
Igor Stelnov
Viktor Tumenev
Mikhail Vasiliev

== Luge ==
Men

Athlete	Run 1		Run 2		Run 3		Run 4		Total	
Athlete	Time	Rank	Time	Rank	Time	Rank	Time	Rank	Time	Rank
Sergey Danilin	46.433	8	46.284	3	46.176	2	46.069	2	3:04.962	2nd place, silver medalist(s)
Valery Dudin	46.385	6	46.334	5	46.201	3	46.092	3	3:05.012	3rd place, bronze medalist(s)
Yury Kharchenko	46.310	5	46.469	6	46.337	5	46.432	8	3:05.548	7

(Men's) Doubles

Athletes	Run 1		Run 2		Total	
Athletes	Time	Rank	Time	Rank	Time	Rank
Yevgeny Belousov; Aleksandr Belyakov	41.813	1	41.847	2	1:23.660	2nd place, silver medalist(s)
Juris Eisaks; Einārs Veikša	42.078	6	42.288	8	1:24.366	7

Women

Athlete	Run 1		Run 2		Run 3		Run 4		Total	
Athlete	Time	Rank	Time	Rank	Time	Rank	Time	Rank	Time	Rank
Nataliya Lisitsa	43.532	17	42.371	8	42.186	7	41.928	6	2:50.087	10
Ingrīda Amantova	42.101	5	42.337	7	42.239	10	41.803	4	2:48.480	4
Vera Zozuļa	42.079	4	42.169	5	42.077	5	42.316	12	2:48.641	5

== Nordic combined ==
Events:

- normal hill ski jumping (Three jumps, best two counted and shown here.)
- 15 km cross-country skiing

Athlete	Event	Ski Jumping				Cross-country			Total	
Athlete	Event	Distance 1	Distance 2	Points	Rank	Time	Points	Rank	Points	Rank
Ildar Garifullin	Individual	74.0	77.0	166.5	26	49:56.5	189.325	19	355.825	23
Sergey Chervyakov	Individual	85.0	88.0	210.3	2	51:11.7	178.045	23	388.345	12
Aleksandr Mayorov	Individual	83.0	86.0	202.7	9	50:27.8	184.630	20	387.330	14
Aleksandr Prosvirnin	Individual	82.5	86.0	199.4	13	48:40.1	200.785	6	400.185	6

== Ski jumping ==
Athlete	Event	Jump 1		Jump 2		Total	
Athlete	Event	Distance	Points	Distance	Points	Points	Rank
Yury Golovchikov	Normal hill	66.0	57.6	84.0	96.9	154.5	50
Valery Savin	Normal hill	76.0	81.6	84.0	97.9	179.5	31
Gennady Prokopenko	Normal hill	79.0	88.4	82.0	95.7	184.1	26
Yury Golovchikov	Large hill	86.0	65.6	98.0	86.4	152.0	39
Gennady Prokopenko	Large hill	93.5	79.1	97.0	88.0	167.1	30

== Speed skating ==
Men

Event	Athlete	Race	
Event	Athlete	Time	Rank
500 m	Aleksandr Danilin	38.66	9
500 m	Vladimir Kozlov	38.57	6
500 m	Sergey Fokichev	38.19	1st place, gold medalist(s)
1000 m	Pavel Pegov	1:18.57	13
1000 m	Viktor Shasherin	1:17.42	6
1000 m	Sergey Khlebnikov	1:16.63	2nd place, silver medalist(s)
1500 m	Viktor Shasherin	1:59.81	8
1500 m	Oleg Bozhev	1:58.89	3rd place, bronze medalist(s)
1500 m	Sergey Khlebnikov	1:58.83	2nd place, silver medalist(s)
5000 m	Sergey Berezin	7:45.94	32
5000 m	Oleg Bozhev	7:17.96	5
5000 m	Igor Malkov	7:12.30	2nd place, silver medalist(s)
10,000 m	Konstantin Korotkov	15:11.10	14
10,000 m	Dmitry Bochkaryov	14:55.65	6
10,000 m	Igor Malkov	14:39.90	1st place, gold medalist(s)

Women

Event	Athlete	Race	
Event	Athlete	Time	Rank
500 m	Nataliya Petrusyova	42.19	6
500 m	Irina Kuleshova-Kovrova	41.70	4
500 m	Nataliya Shive-Glebova	41.50	3rd place, bronze medalist(s)
1000 m	Nataliya Shive-Glebova	1:55.42	37
1000 m	Valentina Lalenkova	1:23.68	4
1000 m	Nataliya Petrusyova	1:23.21	3rd place, bronze medalist(s)
1500 m	Nataliya Kurova	2:08.41	7
1500 m	Valentina Lalenkova	2:08.17	6
1500 m	Nataliya Petrusyova	2:05.78	3rd place, bronze medalist(s)
3000 m	Nataliya Petrusyova	4:39.36	9
3000 m	Valentina Lalenkova	4:37.36	8
3000 m	Olga Pleshkova	4:34.42	4

== Medals by republic ==
In the following table for team events number of team representatives, who received medals are counted, not "one medal for all the team", as usual. Because there were people from different republics in one team.

Rank	Nation	Gold	Silver	Bronze	Total
1	Russian SFSR	28	14	11	53
2	Lithuanian SSR	1	0	0	1
3	Ukrainian SSR	0	1	0	1
4	Kazakh SSR	0	0	1	1
4	Latvian SSR	0	0	1	1
Totals (5 entries)		29	15	13	57
