= China at the 1984 Winter Olympics =

Competed in Sarajevo, Yugoslavia

- IOC code: CHN
- NOC: Chinese Olympic Committee
- Website: www.olympic.cn (in Chinese and English)

in Sarajevo
- Competitors: 37 (21 men, 16 women) in 5 sports
- Flag bearer: Zhao Shijian
- Medals: Gold 0 Silver 0 Bronze 0 Total 0

Winter Olympics appearances (overview)
- 1980; 1984; 1988; 1992; 1994; 1998; 2002; 2006; 2010; 2014; 2018; 2022; 2026

The People's Republic of China competed at the 1984 Winter Olympics in Sarajevo, Yugoslavia.

== Alpine skiing ==
Men

Athlete	Event	Race 1		Race 2		Total	
Athlete	Event	Time	Rank	Time	Rank	Time	Rank
Li Guangquan	Giant Slalom	1:42.16	58	1:42.83	55	3:24.99	54
Liu Changcheng	Giant Slalom	1:41.76	57	1:46.75	58	3:28.51	56
Wu Deqiang	Giant Slalom	1:41.74	56	1:48.66	60	3:30.40	59
Liu Changcheng	Slalom	1:09.87	51	1:08.88	34	2:18.75	33
Li Guangquan	Slalom	1:09.12	46	1:07.47	30	2:16.59	30
Wu Deqiang	Slalom	1:07.62	45	1:06.39	29	2:14.01	29

Women

Athlete	Event	Race 1		Race 2		Total	
Athlete	Event	Time	Rank	Time	Rank	Time	Rank
Wang Guizhen	Giant Slalom	DSQ	–	–	–	DSQ	–
Jin Xuefei	Giant Slalom	1:22.45	49	1:27.90	42	2:50.35	42
Wang Guizhen	Slalom	1:05.14	25	1:01.60	19	2:06.74	20
Jin Xuefei	Slalom	1:02.74	24	1:03.30	20	2:06.04	19

== Biathlon ==
Men

Event	Athlete	Misses ^{1}	Time	Rank
10 km Sprint	Song Wenbin	3	36:53.4	53
10 km Sprint	Liu Hongwang	3	35:56.3	46
10 km Sprint	Song Yongjun	2	35:49.4	45

Event	Athlete	Time	Penalties	Adjusted time ^{2}	Rank
20 km	Long Yunzhou	DNF	–	DNF	–
20 km	Liu Hongwang	1'19:47.5	12	1'31:47.5	54
20 km	Sun Xiaoping	1'20:07.1	8	1'28:07.1	52

Men's 4 x 7.5 km relay

Athletes	Race		
Athletes	Misses ^{1}	Time	Rank
Sun Xiaoping; Long Yunzhou; Liu Hongwang; Song Yongjun	0	1'53:04.1	16

^{1} A penalty loop of 150 metres had to be skied per missed target.
^{2} One minute added per missed target.

== Cross-country skiing ==
Men

Event	Athlete	Race	
Event	Athlete	Time	Rank
15 km	Zhu Dianfa	50:42.3	69
15 km	Lin Guanghao	50:26.1	68
15 km	Li Xiaoming	50:03.3	67
15 km	Song Shi	49:42.1	66
30 km	Li Xiaoming	1'47:32.6	64
30 km	Song Shi	1'47:13.5	62

Men's 4 × 10 km relay

Athletes	Race	
Athletes	Time	Rank
Song Shi; Li Xiaoming; Lin Guanghao; Zhu Dainfa	2'16:52.4	15

Women

Event	Athlete	Race	
Event	Athlete	Time	Rank
5 km	Song Shiji	22:24.1	52
5 km	Chen Yufeng	21:50.2	51
5 km	Tang Yuqin	21:41.5	49
5 km	Dou Aixia	21:33.8	48
10 km	Song Shiji	42:28.1	52
10 km	Zhang Changyun	42:26.6	51
10 km	Dou Aixia	41:35.7	50
10 km	Chen Yufeng	41:27.7	49

Women's 4 × 5 km relay

Athletes	Race	
Athletes	Time	Rank
Dou Aixia; Tang Yugin; Chen Yufeng; Song shiji	1'21:19.6	12

== Figure skating ==
Men

Athlete	CF	SP	FS	TFP	Rank
Zhaoxiao Xu	22	18	17	37.4	18

Women

Athlete	CF	SP	FS	TFP	Rank
Zhenghua Bao	23	21	22	44.2	22

Pairs

Athletes	SP	FS	TFP	Rank
Bo Luan; Bin Yao	15	15	22.5	15

Ice Dancing

Athletes	CD	OD	FD	TFP	Rank
Hongyan Xi; Xiaolei Zhao	19	19	19	38.0	19

== Speed skating ==
Men

Event	Athlete	Race	
Event	Athlete	Time	Rank
500 m	Gai Zhiwu	41.67	38
500 m	Wang Nianchun	40.75	35
500 m	Chen Jianqiang	40.30	29
1000 m	Wang Feifan	1:24.21	40
1000 m	Gai Zhiwu	1:24.20	39
1000 m	Chen Jianqiang	1:22.10	37
1500 m	Li Wei	2:08.38	38
5000 m	Li Wei	7:55.70	40
5000 m	Zhao Shijian	7:46.68	34
10,000 m	Zhao Shijian	15:46.37	30

Women

Event	Athlete	Race	
Event	Athlete	Time	Rank
500 m	Miao Min	44.49	28
500 m	Shen Guoqin	44.21	26
500 m	Cao Guifeng	44.11	25
1000 m	Cao Guifeng	1:30.28	32
1000 m	Miao Min	1:29.22	28
1000 m	Shen Guoqin	1:29.11	26
1500 m	Kong Meiyu	2:19.56	29
1500 m	Wang Xiuli	2:16.68	24
1500 m	Wang Guifang	2:16.19	23
3000 m	Kong Meiyu	5:03.43	23
3000 m	Wang Xiuli	5:00.15	22
3000 m	Wang Guifang	4:59.32	21
