= Luge at the 1984 Winter Olympics – Women's singles =

Women's singles at the XIV Olympic Winter Games
- Venue: Sarajevo Olympic Bobsleigh and Luge Track
- Dates: 9–12 February 1984
- Competitors: 27 from 15 nations
- Winning time: 2:46.570

Medalists
1st place, gold medalist(s)		Steffi Walter-Martin	East Germany
2nd place, silver medalist(s)		Bettina Schmidt	East Germany
3rd place, bronze medalist(s)		Ute Oberhoffner-Weiß	East Germany

The Women's singles luge competition at the 1984 Winter Olympics in Sarajevo was held from 9 to 12 February, at Sarajevo Olympic Bobsleigh and Luge Track.

== Results ==
Rank	Athlete	Country	Run 1	Run 2	Run 3	Run 4	Total
1st place, gold medalist(s)	Steffi Walter-Martin	East Germany	41.639	41.863	41.496	41.572	2:46.570
2nd place, silver medalist(s)	Bettina Schmidt	East Germany	41.662	41.929	41.636	41.646	2:46.873
3rd place, bronze medalist(s)	Ute Oberhoffner-Weiß	East Germany	41.908	41.945	41.793	41.602	2:47.248
4	Ingrīda Amantova	Soviet Union	42.101	42.337	42.239	41.803	2:48.480
5	Vera Zozuļa	Soviet Union	42.079	42.169	42.077	42.316	2:48.641
6	Maria-Luise Rainer	Italy	42.560	42.320	42.330	41.928	2:49.138
7	Annefried Göllner	Austria	42.437	42.643	42.219	42.074	2:49.373
8	Andrea Hatle	West Germany	43.397	42.072	42.102	41.920	2:49.491
9	Constanze Zeitz	West Germany	42.707	42.679	42.300	42.150	2:49.836
10	Nataliya Lisitsa	Soviet Union	43.532	42.371	42.186	41.998	2:50.087
11	Veronika Oberhuber	Italy	43.466	42.534	42.192	42.037	2:50.229
12	Mária Jasenčáková	Czechoslovakia	42.692	43.171	42.849	42.538	2:51.250
13	Monika Auer	Italy	44.466	42.830	41.910	42.070	2:51.276
14	Gabriela Haja	Romania	42.710	43.553	42.668	42.509	2:51.440
15	Bonny Warner	United States	42.632	42.647	44.103	42.528	2:51.910
16	Lotta Dahlberg	Sweden	42.986	43.327	42.859	43.181	2:52.353
17	Dajana Karajica	Yugoslavia	43.901	43.250	42.890	42.619	2:52.660
18	Hitomi Koshimizu	Japan	43.696	43.929	43.508	43.243	2:54.376
19	Theresa Riedl	United States	43.520	43.995	44.620	43.130	2:55.265
20	Toni Damigella	United States	45.170	43.187	45.579	43.045	2:56.981
21	Teng Pi-hui	Chinese Taipei	43.579	43.280	44.107	46.512	2:57.478
22	Susan Rossi	Canada	45.040	43.893	45.964	43.777	2:58.674
23	Agnes Aanonsen	Norway	43.140	43.715	43.378	51.031	3:01.264
24	Carole Keyes	Canada	45.461	49.089	44.715	44.158	3:03.423
-	Claire Sherred	Great Britain	45.580	45.062	45.324	DQ	-
-	Yumiko Kato	Japan	43.752	43.556	53.210	DQ	-
-	Chuang Lai-chun	Chinese Taipei	44.093	DQ	-	-	-
