= Canada at the 1984 Winter Olympics =

- IOC code: CAN
- NOC: Canadian Olympic Committee
- Website: www.olympic.ca (in English and French)

in Sarajevo, Yugoslavia 7 February 1984 – 19 February 1984
- Competitors: 67 (47 men, 20 women) in 8 sports
- Flag bearer: Gaétan Boucher (speed skating)
- Medals Ranked 8th: Gold 2 Silver 1 Bronze 1 Total 4

Winter Olympics appearances (overview)
- 1924; 1928; 1932; 1936; 1948; 1952; 1956; 1960; 1964; 1968; 1972; 1976; 1980; 1984; 1988; 1992; 1994; 1998; 2002; 2006; 2010; 2014; 2018; 2022; 2026

Canada competed at the 1984 Winter Olympics in Sarajevo, Yugoslavia. Canada has competed at every Winter Olympic Games.

As Calgary would be the host city of the following Winter Olympics, its mascots made an appearance at the closing ceremony.

== Medalists ==
Medal	Name	Sport	Event	Date
Gold	Gaétan Boucher	Speed skating	Men's 1000 metres	14 February
Gold	Gaétan Boucher	Speed skating	Men's 1500 metres	16 February
Silver	Brian Orser	Figure skating	Men's singles	16 February
Bronze	Gaétan Boucher	Speed skating	Men's 500 metres	10 February

== Alpine skiing ==
Men

Athlete	Event	Race 1		Race 2		Total	
Athlete	Event	Time	Rank	Time	Rank	Time	Rank
Gary Athans	Downhill					1:48.79	26
Todd Brooker	Downhill					1:46.64	9
Steve Podborski	Downhill					1:46.59	8
Jim Read	Giant Slalom	1:22.90	15	1:24.87	25	2:49.18	24
Michael Tommy	Slalom	DNF	–	–	–	DNF	–

Women

Athlete	Event	Race 1		Race 2		Total	
Athlete	Event	Time	Rank	Time	Rank	Time	Rank
Karen Stemmle	Downhill					1:15.64	22
Liisa Savijarvi	Downhill					1:15.32	18
Laurie Graham	Downhill					1:14.92	11
Gerry Sorensen	Downhill					1:14.30	6
Laurie Graham	Giant Slalom	1:12.89	38	1:15.63	33	2:28.42	33
Andrea Bédard	Giant Slalom	1:12.03	26	DSQ	–	DSQ	–
Diana Haight	Giant Slalom	1:11.27	18	1:13.39	16	2:24.66	17
Liisa Savijarvi	Giant Slalom	1:10.31	9	1:12.42	6	2:22.73	9
Andrea Bédard	Slalom	DNF	–	–	–	DNF	–

== Bobsleigh ==
Sled	Athletes	Event	Run 1		Run 2		Run 3		Run 4		Total	
Sled	Athletes	Event	Time	Rank	Time	Rank	Time	Rank	Time	Rank	Time	Rank
CAN-1	Alan MacLachlan; Robert Wilson	Two-man	52.77	12	53.04	14	52.14	8	52.79	17	3:30.74	14

Sled	Athletes	Event	Run 1		Run 2		Run 3		Run 4		Total	
Sled	Athletes	Event	Time	Rank	Time	Rank	Time	Rank	Time	Rank	Time	Rank
CAN-1	Alan MacLachlan; Clarke Flynn; Robert Wilson; David Leuty	Four-man	51.48	20	51.66	18	51.55	16	51.78	20	3:26.47	18

== Cross-country skiing ==
Men

Event	Athlete	Race	
Event	Athlete	Time	Rank
15 km	Pierre Harvey	43:36.4	21
30 km	Pierre Harvey	1'33:44.4	21
50 km	Pierre Harvey	2'25:04.1	20

Women

Event	Athlete	Race	
Event	Athlete	Time	Rank
5 km	Angela Schmidt-Foster	19:30.1	39
5 km	Sharon Firth	18:37.5	29
5 km	Shirley Firth	18:32.3	28
10 km	Angela Schmidt-Foster	35:35.0	36
10 km	Sharon Firth	34:47.0	29
10 km	Shirley Firth	34:31.3	22
20 km	Angela Schmidt-Foster	DNF	–
20 km	Shirley Firth	1'07:02.5	25
20 km	Sharon Firth	1'06:31.0	21

== Figure skating ==
Men

Athlete	CF	SP	FS	TFP	Rank
Jaime Eggleton	20	19	19	38.6	20
Gary Beacom	10	11	11	21.4	11
Brian Orser	7	1	1	5.6	2nd place, silver medalist(s)

Women

Athlete	CF	SP	FS	TFP	Rank
Elizabeth Manley	16	7	13	25.4	13
Kay Thomson	10	12	10	20.8	12

Pairs

Athletes	SP	FS	TFP	Rank
Melinda Kunhegyi; Lyndon Johnston	13	12	18.5	12
Katherina Matousek; Lloyd Eisler	9	8	12.5	8
Barbara Underhill; Paul Martini	6	7	10.0	7

Ice Dancing

Athletes	CD	OD	FD	TFP	Rank
Kelly Johnson; John Thomas	12	11	11	22.4	12
Tracy Wilson; Robert McCall	7	8	8	15.6	8

== Ice hockey ==
=== Group B ===
Top two teams (shaded ones) advanced to the medal round.

Team	Pld	W	L	T	GF	GA	Pts
Czechoslovakia	5	5	0	0	38	7	10
Canada	5	4	1	0	24	10	8
Finland	5	2	2	1	27	19	5
United States	5	1	2	2	16	17	4
Austria	5	1	4	0	13	37	2
Norway	5	0	4	1	15	43	1

- Canada 4-2 USA
- Canada 8-1 Austria
- Canada 4-2 Finland
- Canada 8-1 Norway
- Czechoslovakia 4-0 Canada

=== Medal round ===
Team	Pld	W	L	T	GF	GA	Pts
Soviet Union	3	3	0	0	16	1	6
Czechoslovakia	3	2	1	0	6	2	4
Sweden	3	1	2	0	3	12	2
Canada 4th	3	0	3	0	0	10	0

- USSR 4-0 Canada
- Sweden 2-0 Canada

Carried over group Match:

- Czechoslovakia 4-0 Canada
- Team Roster
- Darren Eliot
- Mario Gosselin
- Warren Anderson
- Robin Bartel
- J. J. Daigneault
- Bruce Driver
- Doug Lidster
- James Patrick
- Craig Redmond
- Russ Courtnall
- Kevin Dineen
- Dave Donnelly
- Pat Flatley
- Dave Gagner
- Vaughn Karpan
- Darren Lowe
- Kirk Muller
- Dave Tippett
- Carey Wilson
- Dan Wood
- Head coach: Dave King

== Luge ==
Women

Athlete	Run 1		Run 2		Run 3		Run 4		Total	
Athlete	Time	Rank	Time	Rank	Time	Rank	Time	Rank	Time	Rank
Carole Keyes	45.461	26	49.089	26	44.715	22	44.158	22	3:03.423	24
Susan Rossi	45.040	24	43.893	22	45.964	25	43.766	21	2:58.663	22

== Ski jumping ==
Athlete	Event	Jump 1		Jump 2		Total	
Athlete	Event	Distance	Points	Distance	Points	Points	Rank
David Brown	Normal hill	71.0	70.6	77.0	83.2	153.8	51
Horst Bulau	Normal hill	76.0	82.6	78.0	86.8	169.4	38
Ron Richards	Normal hill	78.5	85.6	83.0	95.3	180.9	29
Steve Collins	Normal hill	80.0	92.0	80.5	92.8	184.8	25
David Brown	Large hill	81.0	57.1	84.5	64.5	121.6	47
Ron Richards	Large hill	94.0	79.3	101.0	93.6	172.9	25
Steve Collins	Large hill	99.0	89.8	86.0	66.6	156.4	36
Horst Bulau	Large hill	101.0	94.6	100.0	93.7	188.3	10

== Speed skating ==
Men

Event	Athlete	Race	
Event	Athlete	Time	Rank
500 m	Daniel Turcotte	40.30	29
500 m	Jacques Thibault	39.12	15
500 m	Gaétan Boucher	38.39	3rd place, bronze medalist(s)
1000 m	Jacques Thibault	1:18.79	19
1000 m	Gaétan Boucher	1:15.80	1st place, gold medalist(s)
1500 m	Gaétan Boucher	1:58.36	1st place, gold medalist(s)
5000 m	Jean Pichette	7:50.39	38
5000 m	Ben Lamarche	7:47.25	36

Women

Event	Athlete	Race	
Event	Athlete	Time	Rank
500 m	Sylvie Daigle	43.74	20
1000 m	Sylvie Daigle	1:28.96	25
1000 m	Natalie Grenier	1:27.67	18
1500 m	Sylvie Daigle	2:15.50	22
1500 m	Natalie Grenier	2:14.72	21
3000 m	Natalie Grenier	4:48.60	15
