= World Sprint Speed Skating Championships for Men =

The International Skating Union has organised the World Sprint Speed Skating Championships for Men since 1970. The first two years (1970–1971), they were called the ISU Sprint Championships.

== History ==
=== Distances used ===
- Since 1970, four distances are skated: 500 m, 1000 m, 500 m and 1000 m (the sprint combination).
- In 2022, team sprint event has been held as well.

=== Ranking systems used ===
- Since 1970, the samalog system has been in use. However, the rule that a skater winning at least three distances was automatically World Champion remained in effect until (and including) 1986.

=== Records ===
- Igor Zhelezovski has won a total of six World Championships while representing the Soviet Union (four times in 1985, 1986, 1989, 1991), the Commonwealth of Independent States or CIS (once in 1992) and Belarus (once in 1994).
- Jeremy Wotherspoon from Canada has a record 9 medals, 8 of which were won in consecutive championships (1998–2005) – four golds (1999, 2000, 2002, 2003), four silvers (1998, 2004, 2005, 2008) and one bronze (2001).
- Eric Heiden from the United States has won four consecutive world championships, in 1977, 1978, 1979 and 1980.
- The youngest World Sprint Champion is Eric Heiden from the United States who won his first of four world sprint titles in 1977 at age 18.
- The oldest World Sprint Champion is Lee Kyou-hyuk from South Korea who won his fourth and last world sprint title in 2011 at age 32.
- There are three skaters who co-hold record by number of participations in the championships (15 times) – Gerard van Velde from Netherlands (in 1991–2007), Hiroyasu Shimizu from Japan (in 1993–2007) and Lee Kyou-hyuk from South Korea (in 1998–2014).
- The biggest point margin between the winner and the second placed skater at the end of competition is 3.050 points between Eric Heiden from the United States and Frode Rønning from Norway in 1978.
- The smallest winning margin between the champion and the runner-up is 0.010 points between Gaétan Boucher from Canada and Sergey Khlebnikov from the Soviet Union in 1984.
- There are two speed skaters who become World Sprint Champions by winning all four distances at the championships – Eric Heiden from the United States (1979) and Igor Zhelezovski who represented the Commonwealth of Independent States or CIS (1992).
- Manabu Horii from Japan is the only skater who won three of four distances at the championships but failed to win world title (1997). Due to fall, he finished only 33rd at first distance (500 m) and in overall point classification.
- By contrast, there are 8 speed skaters who become World Sprint Champions without winning any of four distances – Valery Muratov from the Soviet Union (1970), Johan Granath from Sweden (1976), Akira Kuroiwa from Japan (1987), Bae Ki-tae from South Korea (1990), Mike Ireland from Canada (2001), Lee Kyou-hyuk from South Korea (2007), Michel Mulder from Netherlands (2013) and Kai Verbij from Netherlands (2017).
- Eric Heiden and Shani Davis (both from the United States) are only men's speed skaters who become champions both at the World Sprint and the World Allround Championships. Heiden won three World Allround Championships in 1977–1979 and four World Sprint Championships in 1977–1980. He remained the only men's speed skater who win both championships in one calendar year by firstly achieving this feat in 1977 and then repeating this success in 1978 and 1979. Shani Davis is the only men's speed skater who won world titles at three different championships – World Allround Championships (2005 and 2006), World Sprint Championships (2009) and World Single Distances Championships (8 gold medals in 2004–2015).

== Medal winners ==
=== Sprint combination ===
Year	Venue	Gold	Silver	Bronze
1970	West Allis	(Soviet Union) Valery Muratov	(Japan) Keiichi Suzuki	(Norway) Magne Thomassen
1971	Inzell	(West Germany) Erhard Keller	(Sweden) Ove König	(Netherlands) Ard Schenk
1972	Eskilstuna	(Finland) Leo Linkovesi	(Soviet Union) Valery Muratov	(Netherlands) Ard Schenk
1973	Oslo	(Soviet Union) Valery Muratov (2)	(Netherlands) Jos Valentijn	(Netherlands) Eppie Bleeker
1974	Innsbruck	(Norway) Per Bjørang	(Japan) Masaki Suzuki	(Netherlands) Eppie Bleeker
1975	Gothenburg	(Soviet Union) Aleksandr Safronov	(Soviet Union) Yevgeny Kulikov	(Soviet Union) Valery Muratov
1976	West Berlin	(Sweden) Johan Granath	(United States) Dan Immerfall	(United States) Peter Mueller
1977	Alkmaar	(United States) Eric Heiden	(United States) Peter Mueller	(Soviet Union) Yevgeny Kulikov
1978	Lake Placid	(United States) Eric Heiden	(Norway) Frode Rønning	(Sweden) Johan Granath
1979	Inzell	(United States) Eric Heiden	(Canada) Gaétan Boucher	(Norway) Frode Rønning
1980	West Allis	(United States) Eric Heiden (4)	(Canada) Gaétan Boucher	(United States) Tom Plant
1981	Grenoble	(Norway) Frode Rønning	(Soviet Union) Sergey Khlebnikov	(Soviet Union) Anatoly Medennikov
1982	Alkmaar	(Soviet Union) Sergey Khlebnikov	(Canada) Gaétan Boucher	(Norway) Frode Rønning
1983	Helsinki	(Japan) Akira Kuroiwa	(Soviet Union) Pavel Pegov	(Netherlands) Hilbert van der Duim
1984	Trondheim	(Canada) Gaétan Boucher	(Soviet Union) Sergey Khlebnikov	(Norway) Kai Arne Engelstad
1985	Heerenveen	(Soviet Union) Igor Zhelezovski	(Canada) Gaétan Boucher	(United States) Dan Jansen
1986	Karuizawa	(Soviet Union) Igor Zhelezovski	(United States) Dan Jansen	(Japan) Akira Kuroiwa
1987	Sainte Foy	(Japan) Akira Kuroiwa (2)	(United States) Nick Thometz	(Japan) Yukihiro Mitani
1988	West Allis	(United States) Dan Jansen	(East Germany) Uwe-Jens Mey	(United States) Eric Flaim
1989	Heerenveen	(Soviet Union) Igor Zhelezovski	(East Germany) Uwe-Jens Mey	(Soviet Union) Andrey Bakhvalov
1990	Tromsø	(South Korea) Bae Ki-tae	(Soviet Union) Andrey Bakhvalov	(Soviet Union) Igor Zhelezovski
1991	Inzell	(Soviet Union) Igor Zhelezovski	(Germany) Uwe-Jens Mey	(Japan) Toshiyuki Kuroiwa
1992	Oslo	(Commonwealth of Independent States) Igor Zhelezovski	(United States) Dan Jansen	(Japan) Toshiyuki Kuroiwa
1993	Ikaho	(Belarus) Igor Zhelezovski (6)	(Japan) Yasunori Miyabe	(Japan) Hiroyasu Shimizu
1994	Calgary	(United States) Dan Jansen (2)	(Russia) Sergey Klevchenya	(Japan) Junichi Inoue
1995	Milwaukee	(South Korea) Kim Yoon-man	(Japan) Hiroyasu Shimizu	(Japan) Yasunori Miyabe
1996	Heerenveen	(Russia) Sergey Klevchenya	(Japan) Hiroyasu Shimizu	(Japan) Manabu Horii
1997	Hamar	(Russia) Sergey Klevchenya (2)	(Norway) Roger Strøm	(United States) Casey FitzRandolph
1998	Berlin	(Netherlands) Jan Bos	(Canada) Jeremy Wotherspoon	(Netherlands) Erben Wennemars
1999	Calgary	(Canada) Jeremy Wotherspoon	(Netherlands) Jan Bos	(Japan) Hiroyasu Shimizu
2000	Seoul	(Canada) Jeremy Wotherspoon	(Canada) Mike Ireland	(Japan) Hiroyasu Shimizu
2001	Inzell	(Canada) Mike Ireland	(Japan) Hiroyasu Shimizu	(Canada) Jeremy Wotherspoon
2002	Hamar	(Canada) Jeremy Wotherspoon	(United States) Casey FitzRandolph	(Canada) Mike Ireland
2003	Calgary	(Canada) Jeremy Wotherspoon (4)	(Netherlands) Gerard van Velde	(Netherlands) Erben Wennemars
2004	Nagano	(Netherlands) Erben Wennemars	(Canada) Jeremy Wotherspoon	(Canada) Mike Ireland
2005	Salt Lake City	(Netherlands) Erben Wennemars (2)	(Canada) Jeremy Wotherspoon	(United States) Joey Cheek
2006	Heerenveen	(United States) Joey Cheek	(Russia) Dmitry Dorofeyev	(Netherlands) Jan Bos
2007	Hamar	(South Korea) Lee Kyou-hyuk	(Finland) Pekka Koskela	(United States) Shani Davis
2008	Heerenveen	(South Korea) Lee Kyou-hyuk	(Canada) Jeremy Wotherspoon	(South Korea) Mun Jun
2009	Moscow	(United States) Shani Davis	(Japan) Keiichiro Nagashima	(Netherlands) Simon Kuipers
2010	Obihiro	(South Korea) Lee Kyou-hyuk	(South Korea) Lee Kang-seok	(Japan) Keiichiro Nagashima
2011	Heerenveen	(South Korea) Lee Kyou-hyuk (4)	(South Korea) Mo Tae-bum	(United States) Shani Davis
2012	Calgary	(Netherlands) Stefan Groothuis	(South Korea) Lee Kyou-hyuk	(South Korea) Mo Tae-bum
2013	Salt Lake City	(Netherlands) Michel Mulder	(Finland) Pekka Koskela	(Netherlands) Hein Otterspeer
2014	Nagano	(Netherlands) Michel Mulder (2)	(United States) Shani Davis	(Australia) Daniel Greig
2015	Astana	(Russia) Pavel Kulizhnikov	(Netherlands) Hein Otterspeer	(Russia) Aleksey Yesin
2016	Seoul	(Russia) Pavel Kulizhnikov	(Netherlands) Kjeld Nuis	(Netherlands) Kai Verbij
2017	Calgary	(Netherlands) Kai Verbij	(Norway) Håvard Holmefjord Lorentzen	(Netherlands) Kjeld Nuis
2018	Changchun	(Norway) Håvard Holmefjord Lorentzen	(Netherlands) Kjeld Nuis	(Netherlands) Kai Verbij
2019	Heerenveen	(Russia) Pavel Kulizhnikov (3)	(Japan) Tatsuya Shinhama	(Netherlands) Kjeld Nuis
2020	Hamar	(Japan) Tatsuya Shinhama	(Canada) Laurent Dubreuil	(South Korea) Cha Min-kyu
2022	Hamar	(Netherlands) Thomas Krol	(Netherlands) Kai Verbij	(Norway) Håvard Holmefjord Lorentzen
2024	Inzell	(China) Ning Zhongyan	(Netherlands) Jenning de Boo	(Canada) Laurent Dubreuil
2026	Heerenveen	(Netherlands) Jenning de Boo	(United States) Jordan Stolz	(China) Ning Zhongyan

==== Medal table ====
Rank	Nation	Gold	Silver	Bronze	Total
1	Netherlands	9	8	14	31
2	United States	8	8	8	24
3	Soviet Union	8	6	5	19
4	Canada	6	10	4	20
5	South Korea	6	3	3	12
6	Russia	5	2	1	8
7	Japan	3	8	11	22
8	Norway	3	3	5	11
9	Finland	1	2	0	3
10	Sweden	1	1	1	3
11	China	1	0	1	2
12	Belarus	1	0	0	1
12	CIS	1	0	0	1
12	West Germany	1	0	0	1
15	East Germany	0	2	0	2
16	Germany	0	1	0	1
17	Australia	0	0	1	1
Totals (17 entries)		54	54	54	162

=== Team sprint ===
Year	Venue	Gold	Silver	Bronze
2022	Hamar	Norway; Bjørn Magnussen; Henrik Fagerli Rukke; Håvard Holmefjord Lorentzen	Poland; Marek Kania; Piotr Michalski; Damian Żurek	Netherlands; Merijn Scheperkamp; Kai Verbij; Thomas Krol

==== Medal table ====
Rank	Nation	Gold	Silver	Bronze	Total
1	Norway	1	0	0	1
2	Poland	0	1	0	1
3	Netherlands	0	0	1	1
Totals (3 entries)		1	1	1	3

== Combined medal table ==
Rank	Nation	Gold	Silver	Bronze	Total
1	Netherlands	9	8	15	32
2	United States	8	8	8	24
3	Soviet Union	8	6	5	19
4	Canada	6	10	4	20
5	South Korea	6	3	3	12
6	Russia	5	2	1	8
7	Norway	4	3	5	12
8	Japan	3	8	11	22
9	Finland	1	2	0	3
10	Sweden	1	1	1	3
11	China	1	0	1	2
12	Belarus	1	0	0	1
12	CIS	1	0	0	1
12	West Germany	1	0	0	1
15	East Germany	0	2	0	2
16	Germany	0	1	0	1
16	Poland	0	1	0	1
18	Australia	0	0	1	1
Totals (18 entries)		55	55	55	165

== World champions (sprint combination) ==
As of 2026.

Skater	1st place, gold medalist(s)	2nd place, silver medalist(s)	3rd place, bronze medalist(s)	Total
(Soviet Union) / (Commonwealth of Independent States) / (Belarus) Igor Zhelezovski	6	0	1	7
(Canada) Jeremy Wotherspoon	4	4	1	9
(South Korea) Lee Kyou-hyuk	4	1	0	5
(United States) Eric Heiden	4	0	0	4
(Russia) Pavel Kulizhnikov	3	0	0	3
(United States) Dan Jansen	2	2	1	5
(Soviet Union) Valery Muratov	2	1	1	4
(Russia) Sergey Klevchenya	2	1	0	3
(Netherlands) Erben Wennemars	2	0	2	4
(Japan) Akira Kuroiwa	2	0	1	3
(Netherlands) Michel Mulder	2	0	0	2
(Canada) Gaétan Boucher	1	4	0	5
(Soviet Union) Sergey Khlebnikov	1	2	0	3
(United States) Shani Davis	1	1	2	4
(Canada) Mike Ireland	1	1	2	4
(Norway) Frode Rønning	1	1	2	4
(Netherlands) Kai Verbij	1	1	2	4
(Netherlands) Jan Bos	1	1	1	3
(Norway) Håvard Holmefjord Lorentzen	1	1	1	3
(Netherlands) Jenning de Boo	1	1	0	2
(Japan) Tatsuya Shinhama	1	1	0	2
(United States) Joey Cheek	1	0	1	2
(Sweden) Johan Granath	1	0	1	2
(China) Ning Zhongyan	1	0	1	2
(South Korea) Bae Ki-tae	1	0	0	1
(Norway) Per Bjørang	1	0	0	1
(Netherlands) Stefan Groothuis	1	0	0	1
(West Germany) Erhard Keller	1	0	0	1
(South Korea) Kim Yoon-man	1	0	0	1
(Netherlands) Thomas Krol	1	0	0	1
(Finland) Leo Linkovesi	1	0	0	1
(Soviet Union) Aleksandr Safronov	1	0	0	1

== See also ==
- World Sprint Speed Skating Championships for Women
- World Allround Speed Skating Championships
- World Single Distances Speed Skating Championships
- World record progression sprint combination speed skating men
