= Matsuhashi =

Matsuhashi (written: 松橋) is a Japanese surname. Notable people with the surname include:

- Masaru Matsuhashi (松橋 優, born 1985), Japanese footballer
- Miki Matsuhashi (松橋 未樹, born 1983), Japanese singer
- Rikizo Matsuhashi (松橋 力蔵, born 1968), Japanese footballer
- Satoru Matsuhashi (松橋 暁, born 1961), Japanese ski jumper
- Shota Matsuhashi (松橋 章太, born 1982), Japanese footballer
- Shuhei Matsuhashi (松橋 周平, born 1993), Japanese rugby union player
- Takashi Matsuhashi (松橋 高司, born 1932), Japanese cross-country skier
