= Kim Sung-hee =

- Hangul: 김성희
- RR: Gim Seonghui
- MR: Kim Sŏnghŭi

Kim Sung-hee (Korean: 김성희) is a Korean name consisting of the family name Kim and the given name Sung-hee, and may also refer to:

- Kim Sung-hee (Miss Korea) (born 1959), South Korean singer and Miss Korea
- Kim Sung-hee (volleyball) (born 1976), South Korean female volleyball player
- Kim Sung-hee (born 1989), South Korean female singer
- Ja Mezz (born Kim Sung-hee, 1989), South Korean male rapper
- Kim Sung-hee (born 1975), South Korean female manhwa author

== See also ==
- Kim Song-hui (disambiguation) — McCune–Reischauer equivalent
