= Kim Song-hui =

Kim Song-hui (Korean: 김성희) is the name of:

- Kim Song-hui (speed skater) (born 1965), North Korean speed skater
- Kim Song-hui (table tennis) (born 1968), North Korean table tennis player
- Kim Song-hui (footballer) (born 1987), North Korean association footballer

== See also ==
- Kim Sung-hee (born 1989), South Korean singer and former member of the girl band Kara (South Korean band)
- Kim Sung-hee, popular Romanization equivalent of the name
