= Sung-hee =

- Hangul: 성희
- RR: Seonghui
- MR: Sŏnghŭi
- IPA: [sʰʌŋʝi]

Sung-hee or Seong-hui, also spelled Song-hui in North Korea, is a Korean given name.

People with this name include:

Entertainers

- Jo Sung-hee (born 1978), South Korean male film director
- Bada (singer) (born Choi Sung-hee, 1980), South Korean female singer
- Ja Mezz (born Kim Sung-hee, 1989), South Korean male rapper
- Ko Sung-hee (born 1990), South Korean actress

Sportspeople

- Kim Song-hui (speed skater) (born 1965), North Korean male speed skater
- Kim Song-hui (table tennis) (born 1968), North Korean male table tennis player
- Hong Seong-hui (born 1969), South Korean female rhythmic gymnast
- Park Sung-hee (born 1975), South Korean female tennis player
- Ri Song-hui (born 1978), North Korean female weightlifter
- Kim Song-hui (footballer) (born 1987), North Korean female footballer
- Han Sung-hee (born 1990), South Korean female tennis player

Others

- Baek Sung-hee (born 1970), South Korean female molecular geneticist
- Yoon Sung-hee (born 1973), South Korean female writer

== See also ==
- List of Korean given names
- Sung-Hi Lee (이승희; born 1970), South Korean female model
- Ryo Song-hui (려송희; born 1994), North Korean female ice hockey player
