= Dajana Karajica =

Bosnian luger

Personal information
- Nationality: Bosnian
- Born: 20 April 1959 (age 66); Sarajevo, Yugoslavia

Sport
- Country: Yugoslavia
- Sport: Luge

Dajana Karajica (born 20 April 1959) is a Bosnian luger. She competed for Yugoslavia in the women's singles event at the 1984 Winter Olympics.
