= Constanze Zeitz =

German luger

Personal information
- Nationality: German
- Born: 18 January 1964 (age 61); Berchtesgaden, West Germany

Sport
- Sport: Luge

Constanze Zeitz (born 18 January 1964) is a German luger. She competed in the women's singles event at the 1984 Winter Olympics.
