= Speed skating at the 1984 Winter Olympics =

Speed skating at the XIV Olympic Winter Games
- Venue: Zetra Ice Rink
- Dates: 9–18 February 1984
- No. of events: 9
- Competitors: 139 from 24 nations

Speed skating at the 1984 Winter Olympics was held from 9 to 18 February. Nine events were contested at Zetra Ice Rink.

== Medal summary ==
=== Medal table ===
Rank	Nation	Gold	Silver	Bronze	Total
1	East Germany	4	4	3	11
2	Soviet Union	2	3	4	9
3	Canada	2	0	1	3
4	Sweden	1	1	0	2
5	Japan	0	1	0	1
6	Norway	0	0	1	1
Totals (6 entries)		9	9	9	27

East Germany topped the medal table with four gold medals, and eleven total, including a complete sweep of gold and silver medals in the four women's events.

This was only the second Games in which the United States did not win a speed skating medal, and as of 2018, the only time since 1960 the Netherlands did not win a medal in the sport. Japan's Yoshihiro Kitazawa won his country's first Olympic medal in speed skating.

East Germany's Karin Enke led the individual medal table, winning a medal in each of the women's events, finishing with two golds and two silvers. Canada's Gaétan Boucher was the most successful male skater, with two gold medals and a bronze.

=== Men's events ===
Event	Gold		Silver		Bronze	
500 metres	Sergey Fokichev; Soviet Union	38.19	Yoshihiro Kitazawa; Japan	38.30	Gaétan Boucher; Canada	38.39
1000 metres	Gaétan Boucher; Canada	1:15.80	Sergey Khlebnikov; Soviet Union	1:16.63	Kai Arne Engelstad; Norway	1:16.75
1500 metres	Gaétan Boucher; Canada	1:58.36	Sergey Khlebnikov; Soviet Union	1:58.83	Oleg Bozhev; Soviet Union	1:58.89
5000 metres	Tomas Gustafson; Sweden	7:12.28	Igor Malkov; Soviet Union	7:12.30	René Schöfisch; East Germany	7:17.49
10,000 metres	Igor Malkov; Soviet Union	14:39.90	Tomas Gustafson; Sweden	14:39.95	René Schöfisch; East Germany	14:46.91

=== Women's events ===
Event	Gold		Silver		Bronze	
500 metres	Christa Rothenburger; East Germany	41.02 (OR)	Karin Enke; East Germany	41.28	Natalya Glebova; Soviet Union	41.50
1000 metres	Karin Enke; East Germany	1:21.61 (OR)	Andrea Schöne; East Germany	1:22.83	Natalya Petrusyova; Soviet Union	1:23.21
1500 metres	Karin Enke; East Germany	2:03.42 WR	Andrea Schöne; East Germany	2:05.29	Natalya Petrusyova; Soviet Union	2:05.78
3000 metres	Andrea Schöne; East Germany	4:24.79 (OR)	Karin Enke; East Germany	4:26.33	Gabi Zange; East Germany	4:33.13

== Records ==
No men's records were broken in Sarajevo, but all four women's Olympic records were bettered, and there was one world record set as well.

Event	Date	Team	Time	OR	WR
Women's 500 metres	10 February	Christa Rothenburger (GDR)	41.02	OR	
Women's 1000 metres	13 February	Karin Enke (GDR)	1:21.61	OR	
Women's 1500 metres	9 February	Karin Enke (GDR)	2:03.42	OR	WR
Women's 3000 metres	15 February	Andrea Schone (GDR)	4:24.79	OR	

== Participating NOCs ==
Twenty-four nations competed in the speed skating events at Sarajevo. The British Virgin Islands and Yugoslavia made their debuts in the sport.

- Australia (2)
- Austria (4)
- Canada (7)
- China (12)
- Finland (3)
- France (2)
- West Germany (7)
- Great Britain (1)
- East Germany (10)
- Hungary (1)
- Italy (3)
- British Virgin Islands (1)
- Japan (9)
- South Korea (6)
- Netherlands (11)
- Norway (8)
- Poland (3)
- North Korea (6)
- Romania (2)
- Switzerland (1)
- Sweden (6)
- Soviet Union (17)
- United States (13)
- Yugoslavia (4)
