= Mark Huck =

American speed skater

Personal information
- Nationality: American
- Born: August 2, 1957 (age 68) Evanston, Illinois, United States

Sport
- Sport: Speed skating

Mark Huck (born August 2, 1957) is an American speed skater. He competed in the men's 5000 metres event at the 1984 Winter Olympics. He graduated from Princeton University in 1979.
