= Chen Yufeng =

Chen Yufeng may refer to:

- Chen Yufeng (footballer)
- Chen Yufeng (skier)
