= Toni Damigella =

American luger

Personal information
- Born: July 19, 1966 (age 58); Quincy, Massachusetts, United States

Sport
- Sport: Luge

Toni Damigella (born July 19, 1966) is an American luger. She competed in the women's singles event at the 1984 Winter Olympics.
