= Gabriela Haja =

Romanian luger

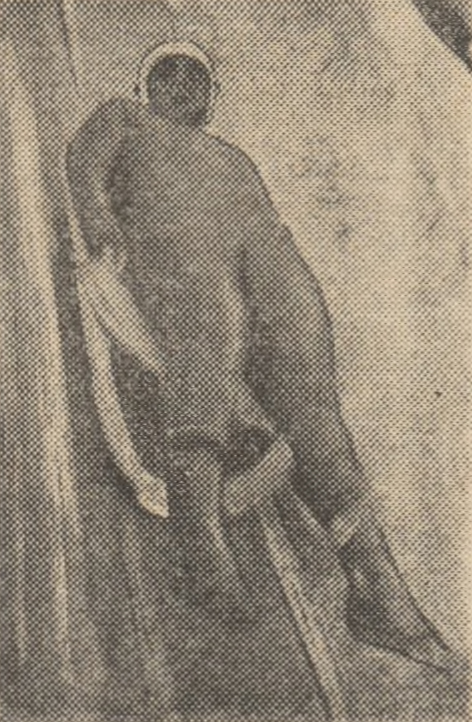

Personal information
- Nationality: Romanian
- Born: 3 May 1965 (age 60) Vatra Dornei, Romania

Sport
- Sport: Luge

Gabriela Haja (born 3 May 1965) is a Romanian luger. She competed in the women's singles event at the 1984 Winter Olympics.
