= Vasja Bajc =

Slovenian ski jumping coach and former ski jumper

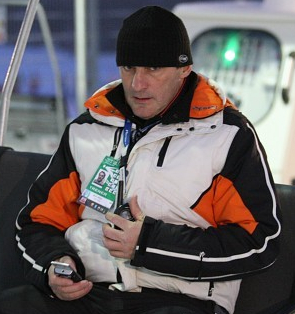
- Bajc in 2009

Personal information
- Nationality: Yugoslavia
- Born: 19 January 1962 (age 64) Ljubljana, SR Slovenia, SFR Yugoslavia
- Height: 1.93 m (6 ft 4 in)

Sport
- Sport: Skiing

World Cup career
- Seasons: 1979–1985; 1988
- Updated on 24 April 2015

Vasja Bajc (born 19 January 1962) is a Slovenian ski jumping coach and former ski jumper who competed from 1979 to 1988, during which time he represented Yugoslavia. At World Cup level his best individual finishes were fifth in Planica on 21 March 1980 and ninth in Harrachov on 14 January 1984. He also competed at the 1984 Winter Olympics in Sarajevo, finishing 15th in the large hill and 17th in the normal hill competitions.

In 1990, having retired from competition, Bajc made the unusual move to coach the Spanish national ski jumping team—a country not known for ski jumping. He relocated to Japan in 1994 to begin personally coaching Kazuyoshi Funaki, which led to Bajc coaching the Japanese national ski jumping team until 2002. Since then he has coached teams from the Netherlands, Sweden, the Czech Republic, Slovenia, and Turkey. From 2014 to 2017 he coached the United States women's ski jumping team.
