= Per Bjørang =

Norwegian speed skater (born 1948)

Personal information
- Full name: Per Andris Bjørang
- Nationality: Norwegian
- Born: 31 January 1948 (age 78) Lillehammer, Norway

Sport
- Country: Norway
- Sport: Speed skating
- Club: Oslo IL
Medal record
World Sprint Championships
Gold medal – first place	1974 Innsbruck	Sprint

Per Andris Bjørang (born 31 January 1948) is a former Norwegian speed skater and Sprint World Champion. At the 1972 Winter Olympics in Sapporo he finished 4th in the 500 metres. He became World Champion in sprint in 1974.

His highest placement on the "Sprint Adelskalender" was number five, in 1976. He was born in Lillehammer and represented the club Oslo IL.
