= Aleksandr Safronov =

Soviet speed skater

Personal information
- Nationality: Soviet
- Born: 12 November 1952
- Died: 21 June 1989 (aged 36)

Sport
- Country: Soviet Union
- Sport: Speed skating
Medal record
World Sprint Championships
Gold medal – first place	1975 Gothenburg	Sprint

Aleksandr Safronov (12 November 1952 – 21 June 1989) was a Soviet speed skater. He competed in the men's 1000 metres events at the 1976 Winter Olympics.
