= Theresa Riedl =

American luger

Personal information
- Nationality: American
- Born: July 9, 1965 (age 59); Saddle Brook, New Jersey, United States

Sport
- Sport: Luge

Theresa Riedl (born July 9, 1965) is an American luger. She competed in the women's singles event at the 1984 Winter Olympics.
