= Chuang Lai-chun =

Taiwanese luger (born 1961)

Personal information
- Nationality: Taiwanese
- Born: 3 February 1961 (age 64)

Sport
- Sport: Luge

Chuang Lai-chun (born 3 February 1961) is a Taiwanese luger. She competed in the women's singles event at the 1984 Winter Olympics.
