= Georg Waldvogel =

German ski jumper

Personal information
- Nationality: German
- Born: 7 July 1961 (age 65) Hinterzarten, West Germany

Sport
- Sport: Ski jumping

Georg Waldvogel (born 7 July 1961) is a German ski jumper. He competed in the normal hill and large hill events at the 1984 Winter Olympics.
