= Ángel Janiquet =

Spanish ski jumper

Personal information
- Nationality: Spanish
- Born: 25 October 1962 (age 62); Barcelona, Spain

Sport
- Sport: Ski jumping

Ángel Janiquet (born 25 October 1962) is a Spanish ski jumper. He competed in the normal hill event at the 1984 Winter Olympics.
