= José Rivera (ski jumper) =

Spanish ski jumper

Personal information
- Nationality: Spanish
- Born: 29 December 1962 (age 62); Barcelona, Spain

Sport
- Sport: Ski jumping

José Rivera (born 29 December 1962) is a Spanish ski jumper. He competed in the normal hill and large hill events at the 1984 Winter Olympics.
