= Claire Sherred =

British luger

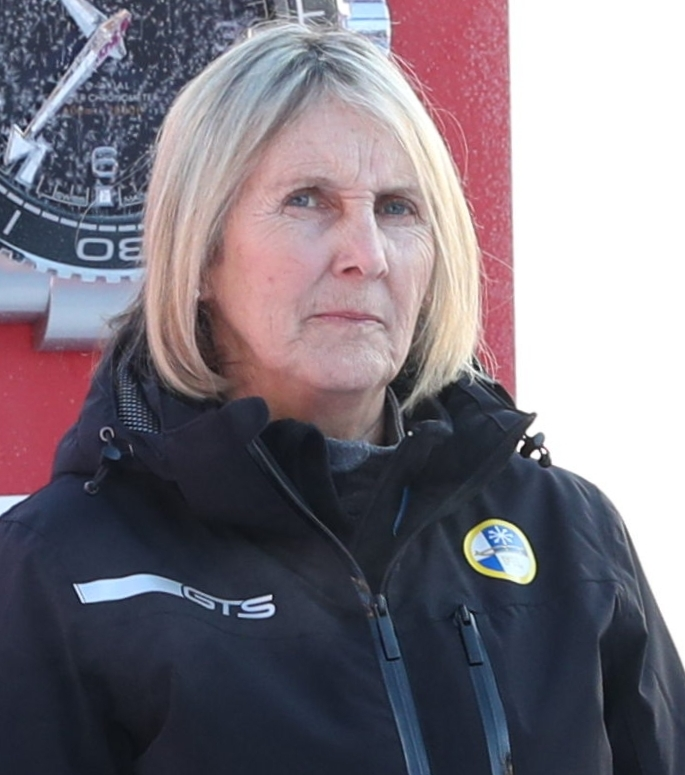

Personal information
- Nationality: British
- Born: 5 November 1956 (age 68); Croydon, England

Sport
- Sport: Luge

Claire Sherred (born 5 November 1956) is a British luger. She competed in the women's singles event at the 1984 Winter Olympics.
