= Lotta Dahlberg =

Swedish luger (born 1962)

Personal information
- Nationality: Swedish
- Born: 9 October 1962 (age 62); Stockholm, Sweden

Sport
- Sport: Luge

Lotta Dahlberg (born 9 October 1962) is a Swedish luger. She competed in the women's singles event at the 1984 Winter Olympics.
