= Andrea Hatle =

German luger

Personal information
- Full name: Andrea van Heugten-Hátlová
- Nationality: German, Dutch
- Born: 11 June 1965 (age 61) Teplice, Czechoslovakia

Sport
- Sport: Luge

Andrea Hatle (born 11 June 1965) is a German luger. She competed in the women's singles event at the 1984 Winter Olympics. She's the General Secretary of the BSBN.
