= Aleksandr Danilin =

Soviet speed skater (1961–2019)

Personal information
- Nationality: Soviet
- Born: 20 June 1961; Moscow, Russian SFSR, Soviet Union
- Died: 26 January 2019 (aged 57)

Sport
- Sport: Speed skating

Aleksandr Danilin (20 June 1961 – 26 January 2019) was a Soviet speed skater. He competed in the men's 500 metres event at the 1984 Winter Olympics.
