= René Schöfisch =

German speed skater

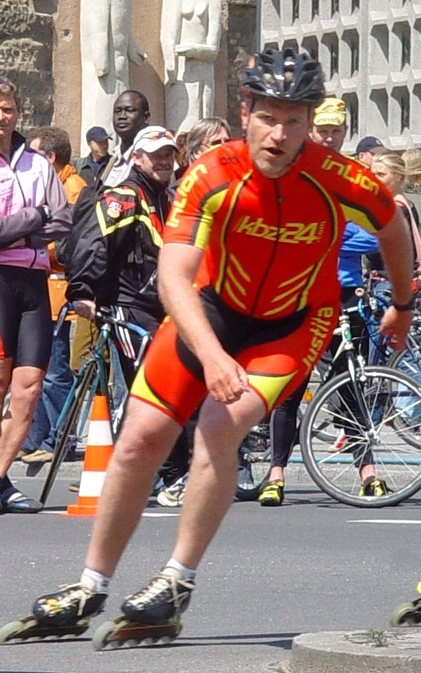
- Schöfisch in 2005

Medal record

Men's Speed Skating

Olympic Games
| Bronze medal – third place | 1984 Sarajevo | 5000 m |
| Bronze medal – third place | 1984 Sarajevo | 10000 m |

René Schöfisch (born 3 February 1962) is a German speed skater who competed for East Germany in the 1984 Winter Olympics.

He was born in East Berlin. He won bronze medals in the 5000 metres and 10000 metres at the 1984 Winter Olympics in Sarajevo.
