= Yury Golovshchikov =

Soviet ski jumper

Personal information
- Nationality: Soviet
- Born: 10 July 1963 (age 61); Leningrad, Russian SFSR, Soviet Union

Sport
- Sport: Ski jumping

Yury Golovshchikov (born 10 July 1963) is a Soviet ski jumper. He competed in the normal hill and large hill events at the 1984 Winter Olympics.
