= Sun Xiaoping =

Chinese biathlete

Personal information
- Nationality: Chinese
- Born: 20 June 1962 (age 62)

Sport
- Sport: Biathlon

Sun Xiaoping (born 20 June 1962) is a Chinese biathlete. He competed in the 20 km individual event at the 1984 Winter Olympics.
