= Yasushi Suzuki =

Japanese speed skater (born 1962)

Personal information
- Nationality: Japanese
- Born: 15 May 1962 (age 64) Hokkaido, Japan

Sport
- Sport: Speed skating

Yasushi Suzuki (鈴木 靖, Suzuki Yasushi; born 15 May 1962) is a Japanese speed skater. He competed in the men's 500 metres event at the 1984 Winter Olympics.
