= Shoichi Kinoshita =

Japanese biathlete (born 1954)

Personal information
- Nationality: Japanese
- Born: 25 December 1954 (age 70); Niigata, Japan

Sport
- Sport: Biathlon

Shoichi Kinoshita (born 25 December 1954) is a Japanese biathlete. He competed in the 20 km individual event at the 1984 Winter Olympics.
