= Aivars Šnepsts =

Latvian bobsledder

Personal information
- Nationality: Latvian
- Born: 27 September 1957 (age 67); Ventspils, Latvian SSR, Soviet Union

Sport
- Sport: Bobsleigh

Aivars Šnepsts (born 27 September 1957) is a Latvian bobsledder. He competed in the two man and the four man events at the 1984 Winter Olympics, representing the Soviet Union.
