= Johan Granath =

Swedish speed skater

Personal information
- Nationality: Swedish
- Born: 4 March 1950 (age 76) Köping, Sweden

Sport
- Country: Sweden
- Sport: Speed skating
- Club: SK Pollux
Medal record
World Sprint Championships
Gold medal – first place	1976 West-Berlin	Sprint
Bronze medal – third place	1978 Lake Placid	Sprint

Johan Granath (born 4 March 1950) is a Swedish speed skater. He competed at the 1972 Winter Olympics, the 1976 Winter Olympics and the 1980 Winter Olympics. In March 1976, he won the Sprint World Championship title. The same year, he also appeared on the television show Superstars.
