= Satoshi Sugawara =

Japanese bobsledder (born 1959)

Personal information
- Nationality: Japanese
- Born: 26 November 1959 (age 65); Hokkaido, Japan

Sport
- Sport: Bobsleigh

Satoshi Sugawara (born 26 November 1959) is a Japanese bobsledder. He competed in the two man and the four man events at the 1984 Winter Olympics.
