= Li Xiaoming (biathlete) =

Chinese skier

Personal information
- Full name: 李晓明
- Nationality: Chinese
- Born: 5 February 1958 (age 67); Xianghe County, China

Sport
- Sport: Biathlon, cross-country skiing

Li Xiaoming (born 5 February 1958) is a Chinese skier. He competed at the 1980 Winter Olympics and the 1984 Winter Olympics.
