= Yoshinobu Murase =

Japanese biathlete (born 1957)

Personal information
- Nationality: Japanese
- Born: 3 March 1957 (age 68); Hokkaido, Japan

Sport
- Sport: Biathlon

Yoshinobu Murase (born 3 March 1957) is a Japanese biathlete. He competed in the 20 km individual event at the 1984 Winter Olympics, finishing in 43rd place.
