= Susan Rossi =

Canadian luger

Personal information
- Born: 5 March 1963 (age 62); Hamilton, Ontario, Canada

Sport
- Sport: Luge

Susan Rossi (born 5 March 1963) is a Canadian luger. She competed in the women's singles event at the 1984 Winter Olympics.
