= Yuji Funayama (bobsleigh) =

Japanese bobsledder (born 1953)

Personal information
- Nationality: Japanese
- Born: 1 August 1953 (age 71); Hokkaido, Japan

Sport
- Sport: Bobsleigh

Yuji Funayama (船山 雄次, Funayama Yūji, born 1 August 1953) is a Japanese bobsledder. He competed at the 1980 Winter Olympics and the 1984 Winter Olympics.
