= Li Wei (speed skater) =

Chinese speed skater

Li Wei (Chinese: 李伟, born 12 October 1961) is a former Chinese speed skater who participated in the 1984 Winter Olympics where he finished in 40th (5000 m) and 38th (1500 m) place.
