= Yumiko Kato =

Japanese luger (born 1968)

Personal information
- Nationality: Japanese
- Born: 1 January 1968 (age 57); Sapporo, Japan

Sport
- Sport: Luge

Yumiko Kato (born 1 January 1968) is a Japanese luger. She competed in the women's singles event at the 1984 Winter Olympics.
