= Konstantin Korotkov =

Soviet speed skater

Personal information
- Full name: Konstantin Yuryevich Korotkov
- Nationality: Soviet Union
- Born: 18 July 1961 (age 63); Oskemen, Kazakh SSR, Soviet Union

Sport
- Sport: Speed skating

Konstantin Yuryevich Korotkov (Russian: Константин Юрьевич Коротков; born 18 July 1961) is a Soviet speed skater. He competed in the men's 10,000 metres event at the 1984 Winter Olympics.
