= Vladimir Kozlov (speed skater) =

Soviet speed skater

Personal information
- Nationality: Soviet
- Born: 1 August 1959 (age 65); Oskemen, Kazakh SSR, Soviet Union

Sport
- Sport: Speed skating

Vladimir Kozlov (born 1 August 1959) is a Soviet former speed skater. He competed in the men's 500 metres event at the 1984 Winter Olympics.
