= Wang Feifan =

Chinese speed skater

Personal information
- Nationality: Chinese
- Born: 4 December 1958 (age 66)

Sport
- Sport: Speed skating

Wang Feifan (born 4 December 1958) is a Chinese speed skater. He competed in the men's 1000 metres event at the 1984 Winter Olympics.
