= Alan MacLachlan =

Canadian bobsledder

Personal information
- Born: 2 May 1957 (age 67); Toronto, Ontario, Canada

Sport
- Sport: Bobsleigh

Alan MacLachlan (born 2 May 1957) is a Canadian bobsledder. He competed at the 1980 Winter Olympics and the 1984 Winter Olympics.
