= Landis Arnold =

American ski jumper (born 1960)

Landis Arnold (born August 6, 1960) is an American former ski jumper who competed in the 1984 Winter Olympics.
