= Gennady Prokopenko =

Soviet ski jumper

Personal information
- Nationality: Soviet
- Born: 18 January 1964 (age 61); Perm, Russian SFSR, Soviet Union

Sport
- Sport: Ski jumping

Gennady Prokopenko (born 18 January 1964) is a Soviet ski jumper. He competed in the normal hill and large hill events at the 1984 Winter Olympics.
