= Sergey Khlebnikov =

Russian speed skater (1955–1999)

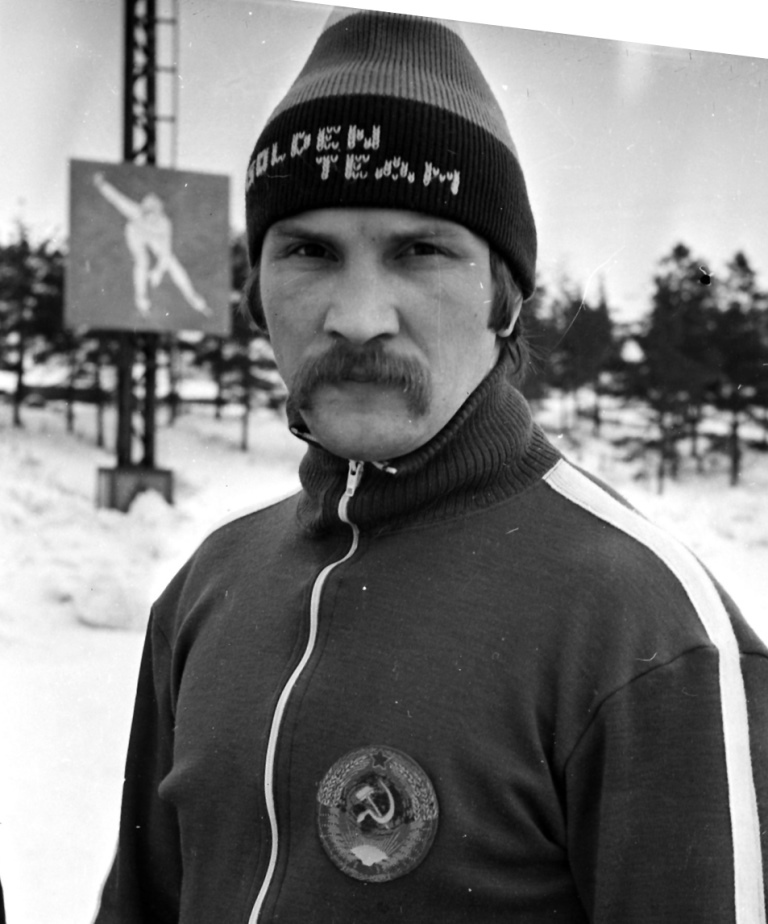

Personal information
- Full name: Sergey Anatolevich Khlebnikov
- Born: 28 August 1955 Sortavala, Russian SFSR, Soviet Union
- Died: 12 June 1999 (aged 43) Moscow, Russia
- Height: 1.82 m (6 ft 0 in)
- Weight: 90 kg (198 lb)

Sport
- Sport: Speed skating
- Club: Spartak Moscow
Medal record
Men's speed skating
Representing the Soviet Union
Olympic Games
| Silver medal – second place | 1984 Sarajevo | 1000 m |
| Silver medal – second place | 1984 Sarajevo | 1500 m |
World Sprint Championships
| Silver medal – second place | 1981 Grenoble | Sprint |
| Gold medal – first place | 1982 Alkmaar | Sprint |
| Silver medal – second place | 1984 Trondheim | Sprint |

Sergey Anatolevich Khlebnikov (Russian: Серге́й Анатольевич Хлебников; 28 August 1955 – 12 June 1999) was a Russian speed skater who competed for the Soviet Union in the 1980 and the 1984 Winter Olympics.

He was born in Sortavala and died in Moscow by drowning in the Mitinskoe pond. "An oak of a man," the Western press described him as a "tank" and a typical product of communism.

== Career ==
In the late 1970s and early 1980s, Khlebnikov was one of the perennial favorites in the sprint events, battling often with fellow Soviet sprinter Yevgeny Kulikov, Japanese sprinter Akira Kuroiwa, Norwegian sprinter Frode Rønning and American all-rounder Eric Heiden. Throughout his career, his biggest rival, even his "archrival," was Canadian skater Gaétan Boucher.

== World championships ==
Khlebnikov's first medal as a sprinter came in 1981, when he finished second in the world sprint championship in Grenoble, after Boucher fell in the 500 meters. He won his only world sprint championship in Alkmaar in 1982. The next year, in Helsinki, a fall in the 500 meter race meant he lost the crown to Akira Kuroiwa. In 1984, he finished second in the world sprint championship in Trondheim after leading on the first day, but the next year, his career as the strongest Soviet sprinter was over, Igor Zhelezovski ("Igor the Terrible") having become world sprint champion in 1985.

== Olympic participation ==
In 1980 Khlebnikov finished ninth in the 1000 meters and 15th in the 500 meters competition; the speed skating competition was dominated by Eric Heiden.

Four years later, at the Olympics in Sarajevo, Khlebnikov was outmatched by Gaétan Boucher, who dominated the short events with gold in the 1000 and the 1500 meters; Khlebnikov won the silver medal in the 1000 meters and the 1500 meters. In Sarajevo he competed in the 500 meters event as well, but a false start cost him the chance at a medal.
