= Yusei Nakazawa =

Japanese cross-country skier (born 1962)

Personal information
- Nationality: Japanese
- Born: 20 June 1962 (age 62); Aomori, Japan

Sport
- Sport: Cross-country skiing

Yusei Nakazawa (born 20 June 1962) is a Japanese cross-country skier. He competed in the men's 15 kilometre event at the 1984 Winter Olympics.
