= Hideaki Yamada =

Japanese cross-country skier (born 1960)

Personal information
- Nationality: Japanese
- Born: 25 September 1960 (age 64); Aomori, Japan

Sport
- Sport: Cross-country skiing

Hideaki Yamada (山田 秀明, Yamada Hideaki, born 25 September 1960) is a Japanese cross-country skier. He competed in the men's 15 kilometre event at the 1984 Winter Olympics.
