= Valery Savin =

Soviet ski jumper

Personal information
- Nationality: Soviet
- Born: 21 June 1951 (age 73); Sakhalin, Russian SFSR, Soviet Union

Sport
- Sport: Ski jumping

Valery Savin (born 21 June 1951) is a Soviet ski jumper. He competed in the normal hill event at the 1984 Winter Olympics.
