= Lin Guanghao =

Chinese cross-country skier

Personal information
- Full name: 林广浩
- Nationality: Chinese
- Born: 14 August 1959 (age 65)

Sport
- Sport: Cross-country skiing

Lin Guanghao (born 14 August 1959) is a Chinese cross-country skier. He competed at the 1980 Winter Olympics and the 1984 Winter Olympics.
