= Zhu Dianfa =

Chinese cross-country skier

Personal information
- Nationality: Chinese
- Born: 30 September 1964 (age 60); Jilin, China

Sport
- Sport: Cross-country skiing

Zhu Dianfa (born 30 September 1964) is a Chinese cross-country skier. He competed in the men's 15 kilometre event at the 1984 Winter Olympics.
