= Yuji Yaku =

Japanese bobsledder (born 1961)

Personal information
- Nationality: Japanese
- Born: 3 January 1961 (age 64); Fujioka, Japan

Sport
- Sport: Bobsleigh

Yuji Yaku (born 3 January 1961) is a Japanese bobsledder. He competed at the 1984 Winter Olympics and the 1988 Winter Olympics.
