= Nataliya Lisitsa =

Russian luger (born 1961)

Personal information
- Nationality: Russian
- Born: 29 May 1961 (age 63); Tatrina, Soviet Union

Sport
- Sport: Luge

Nataliya Lisitsa (born 29 May 1961) is a Russian luger. She competed in the women's singles event at the 1984 Winter Olympics.
