= Tsukasa Hirakawa =

Japanese luger (born 1964)

Personal information
- Nationality: Japanese
- Born: 10 January 1964 (age 61); Sapporo, Japan

Sport
- Sport: Luge

Tsukasa Hirakawa (born 10 January 1964) is a Japanese luger. He competed at the 1984 Winter Olympics and the 1988 Winter Olympics.
