= Hiroshi Okachi =

Japanese bobsledder (born 1955)

Personal information
- Nationality: Japanese
- Born: 30 March 1955 (age 69); Sapporo, Japan

Sport
- Sport: Bobsleigh

Hiroshi Okachi (born 30 March 1955) is a Japanese bobsledder. He competed in the two man and the four man events at the 1984 Winter Olympics.
