= Zhao Shijian =

Chinese speed skater

Personal information
- Nationality: Chinese
- Born: 10 March 1955 (age 70)

Sport
- Sport: Speed skating

Zhao Shijian (born 10 March 1955) is a Chinese speed skater. He competed in two events at the 1984 Winter Olympics.
