= Gérard Colin =

French ski jumper

Personal information
- Nationality: French
- Born: 3 March 1958 (age 67); La Bresse, France

Sport
- Sport: Ski jumping

Gérard Colin (born 3 March 1958) is a French ski jumper. He competed at the 1980 Winter Olympics and the 1984 Winter Olympics.
