= Janusz Malik =

Polish former ski jumper (born 1964)

Personal information
- Full name: Janusz Malik
- Born: 30 September 1964 (age 61) Bielsko-Biała, Poland
- Height: 1.70 m (5 ft 7 in)

Sport
- Sport: Skiing

World Cup career
- Seasons: 1984
- Indiv. podiums: 1
- Updated on 30 Mar 2017

Janusz Malik (born 30 September 1964) is a Polish former ski jumper. He competed at the 1984 Winter Olympics.
