= Stefan Stannarius =

East German ski jumper (born 1961)

Stefan Stannarius (born 20 October 1961 in Gräfenthal) was an East German ski jumper who competed from 1982 to 1984. He finished fourth in the individual normal hill event at the 1984 Winter Olympics in Sarajevo.

Stannarius's best career finish was third in an individual large hill event in Switzerland in 1983.
