= Kimihiro Hamaya =

Japanese speed skater (born 1963)

Personal information
- Nationality: Japanese
- Born: 21 March 1963 (age 62); Hokkaido, Japan

Sport
- Sport: Speed skating

Kimihiro Hamaya (浜谷 公宏, Hamaya Kimihiro, born 21 March 1963) is a Japanese speed skater. He competed at the 1984 Winter Olympics and the 1988 Winter Olympics.
