= Igor Malkov =

Soviet speed skater

Personal information
- Nationality: Russian
- Born: Igor Alekseyevich Malkov; 9 February 1965 (age 61) Pervouralsk, Russian SFSR, Soviet Union
- Height: 1.86 m (6 ft 1 in)
- Weight: 82 kg (181 lb)

Sport
- Country: Soviet Union
- Sport: Speed skating
- Turned pro: 1982
- Retired: 1988

Achievements and titles
- Personal best(s): 500 m: 39.28 (1983); 1000 m: 1:16.99 (1983); 1500 m: 1:54.35 (1983); 3000 m: 4:06.54 (1984); 5000 m: 6:52.69 (1984); 10 000 m: 13:54.81 (1984)
Medal record
Men's speed skating
Silver medal – second place	1984 Sarajevo	5,000 m
Gold medal – first place	1984 Sarajevo	10,000 m

Igor Alekseyevich Malkov (Russian: И́горь Алексе́евич Малко́в; born 9 February 1965 in Pervouralsk, Soviet Union) is a former speedskater.

Igor Malkov trained at VSS Trud in Sverdlovsk. Skating for the USSR, he became Olympic 10,000 m Champion at the 1984 Olympic Games in Sarajevo, only 0.05 seconds ahead of Tomas Gustafson, becoming the youngest male Olympic champion in the history of Olympic speed skating at an age of 19 years and 9 days. (The youngest female Olympic speedskater winner is American Anne Henning, who won the 500 m in 1972 at the age of 16.)

Earlier at those Olympics, he had lost the 5,000 m race by only 0.02 seconds to Gustafson. Before that, during the same winter, Malkov had sent shock waves into the speed skating world when he skated 13:54.81 on the 10,000 m, thus becoming the first to break the 14 minutes barrier (and almost 30 seconds ahead of the time set by then-current world record holder Gustafson) during the Christmas races at Medeu in December 1983. However, this time was never recognised as a world record by the International Skating Union. He set a new, official, world record later the same season, when he finished in a time of 14:21.51 at Medeo in March 1984, almost 30 seconds behind his personal best. His official world record would last for almost two years (until broken by Geir Karlstad on 16 February 1986) and his internationally unrecognised record was unbroken for four years (until broken by, again, Geir Karlstad, on 4 December 1987). The following seasons were not so good for Malkov, and he quit top skating after the 1988 season, although he made one more appearance at the Soviet Allround Championships of 1990.

Malkov was awarded the Order of Friendship of Peoples in 1984.

== Records ==
=== World records ===
Over the course of his career, Malkov skated one officially ISU-recognised world record, in addition to his more famous but not ISU-recognised 13:54.81:

Event	Time	Date	Venue
10,000 m	14.21,51	24 March 1984	Medeo

Source: SpeedSkatingStats.com

=== Personal records ===
Event	Result	Date	Venue
500 m	39.28	28 December 1983	Medeo
1,000 m	1:16.99	28 March 1983	Medeo
1,500 m	1:54.35	27 December 1983	Medeo
3,000 m	4:06.54	1 December 1984	Karl-Marx-Stadt
5,000 m	6:52.69	23 November 1984	Medeo
10,000 m	13:54.81	28 December 1983	Medeo
Big combination	160.489	28 December 1983	Medeo

Malkov has an Adelskalender score of 160.405 points. In 1984, he had his highest ranking on the Adelskalender when he was third, allowing only his fellow countrymen Viktor Shasherin and Andrey Bobrov before him.
