= Sergey Fokichev =

Russian speed skater (born 1963)

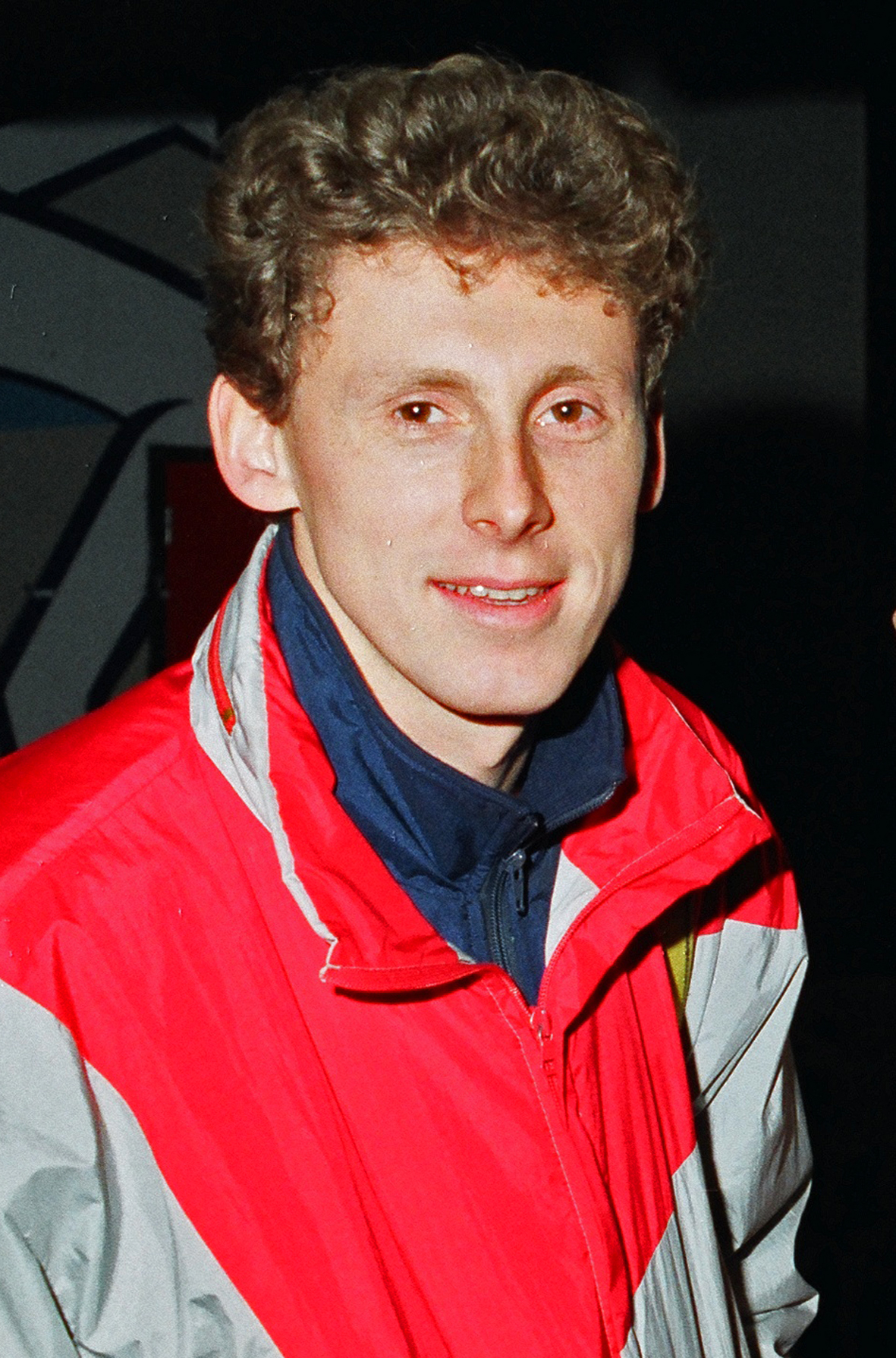

Personal information
- Born: 4 February 1963 (age 63) Cherepovets, Russian SFSR, Soviet Union
- Height: 1.83 m (6 ft 0 in)
- Weight: 76 kg (168 lb)

Sport
- Country: Soviet Union
Medal record
Men's Speed Skating
Representing the Soviet Union
Olympic Games
Gold medal – first place	1984 Sarajevo	500 m

Sergey Rostislavovich Fokichev (Russian: Серге́й Ростиславович Фокичев) (born 4 February 1963 in Cherepovets) is a former Russian speed skater who represented the USSR at the 1984 Olympics of Sarajevo, where he won the 500 m. He trained at VSS Trud and later at the Armed Forces sports society in Moscow.

Fokichev was the first speedskater to break the 36 seconds barrier on the 500 meter outside of the then fastest track in Almaty. After the 1984 Olympics, Fokichev won both the 500 m races at the World Sprint Championships. He also competed at the 1988 Winter Olympics in Calgary, coming fourth in the 500 m. He was awarded the Order of the Badge of Honor in 1984.

== Personal records ==
Personal records
Men's Speed skating
Event	Result	Date	Location	Notes
500 m	36.40	1986		
1,000 m	1:14.45	1987		
1,500 m	1:57.93	1984		
