= Yoshihiro Kitazawa =

Japanese speed skater (born 1962)

Medal record

Men's speed skating

Representing Japan

Olympic Games
Silver medal – second place	1984 Sarajevo	500 m

Yoshihiro Kitazawa (北沢 欣浩, Kitazawa Yoshihiro, born 4 August 1962) is a Japanese speed skater who competed in the 1984 Winter Olympics.

He was born in Kushiro, Hokkaidō.

In 1984 he won the silver medal in the 500 metres event. In the 1000 metres competition he finished 31st.
