= Satoru Matsuhashi =

Japanese ski jumper

Personal information
- Nationality: Japanese
- Born: 6 December 1961 (age 64) Kazuno, Japan

Sport
- Sport: Ski jumping

Satoru Matsuhashi (松橋 暁, Matsuhashi Satoru; born 6 December 1961) is a Japanese ski jumper. He competed in the normal hill and large hill events at the 1984 Winter Olympics.
