= Gai Zhiwu =

Chinese speed skater

Personal information
- Nationality: Chinese
- Born: 4 May 1960 (age 64)

Sport
- Sport: Speed skating

Gai Zhiwu (born 4 May 1960) is a Chinese speed skater. He competed in two events at the 1984 Winter Olympics.
