= Angel Stoyanov (ski jumper) =

Bulgarian ski jumper

Angel Stoyanov (Bulgarian: Ангел Стоянов), born June 23, 1958, in Samokov, is a Bulgarian ski jumper. He came in 49th place in both the normal hill (70 m) and large hill (90 m) ski-jump events at the 1984 Winter Olympics in Sarajevo.
