= Chen Jianqiang (speed skater) =

Chinese speed skater

Personal information
- Nationality: Chinese
- Born: 1 June 1957 (age 67)

Sport
- Sport: Speed skating

Chen Jianqiang (born 1 June 1957) is a Chinese speed skater. He competed in two events at the 1984 Winter Olympics.
