= Dennis McGrane =

American ski jumper

Dennis McGrane (born July 7, 1962) is an American former ski jumper who competed in the 1984 Winter Olympics and in the 1988 Winter Olympics.
