= Peter Rohwein =

German ski jumper

Peter Rohwein (born 26 June 1962 in Isny) is a West German former ski jumper who competed from 1981 to 1988.

He finished sixth in the team large hill event at the 1988 Winter Olympics in Calgary. Rohwein's best individual World Cup finish was also sixth in a normal hill event in France in 1985.

Rohwein coached the German Nordic combined team between 2000 and 2004, overseeing Ronny Ackermann when he won his two FIS Nordic Combined World Cup titles and a gold at the 2003 World Championships. He was coach of the German ski jumping team from 2004 until March 2008, when he was dismissed for lack of success. Germany won only one medal under Rohwein, a silver medal in the team event on the normal hill in Oberstdorf, and with two World Cup victories (one team) during the three seasons of his coaching. It should, however, be noted that no wins were recorded in the season before Rohwein took over the team, and Michael Uhrmann's eighth place in the overall World Cup standings of 2005–06 was the best since Sven Hannawald in 2002–03.
