= Daniel Turcotte =

Canadian speed skater

Personal information
- Born: 25 June 1962 (age 62); Lachine, Quebec, Canada

Sport
- Sport: Speed skating

Daniel Turcotte (born 25 June 1962) is a Canadian speed skater. He competed at the 1984 Winter Olympics and the 1988 Winter Olympics.
