= Hiroo Shima =

Japanese ski jumper

Personal information
- Full name: Hiroo Shima
- Nationality: Japan
- Born: 10 March 1963 (age 63) Shimokawa, Japan
- Height: 1.70 m (5 ft 7 in)

Sport
- Sport: Skiing

World Cup career
- Seasons: 1985–1988
- Indiv. podiums: 1
- Updated on 30 Mar 2015

Hiroo Shima (嶋 宏大, Shima Hiroo; born 10 March 1963) is a Japanese former ski jumper. He competed in the Sarajevo Winter Olympics at the age of 20.
