= David Brown (ski jumper) =

Canadian ski jumper

David Brown (born 16 September 1965) is a Canadian former ski jumper from Thunder Bay, Ontario who competed in the 1984 Winter Olympics in Sarajevo.

He came 51st in the normal-sized-hill jump, and 47th in the large hill jump.
