= Frode Rønning =

Norwegian speed skater

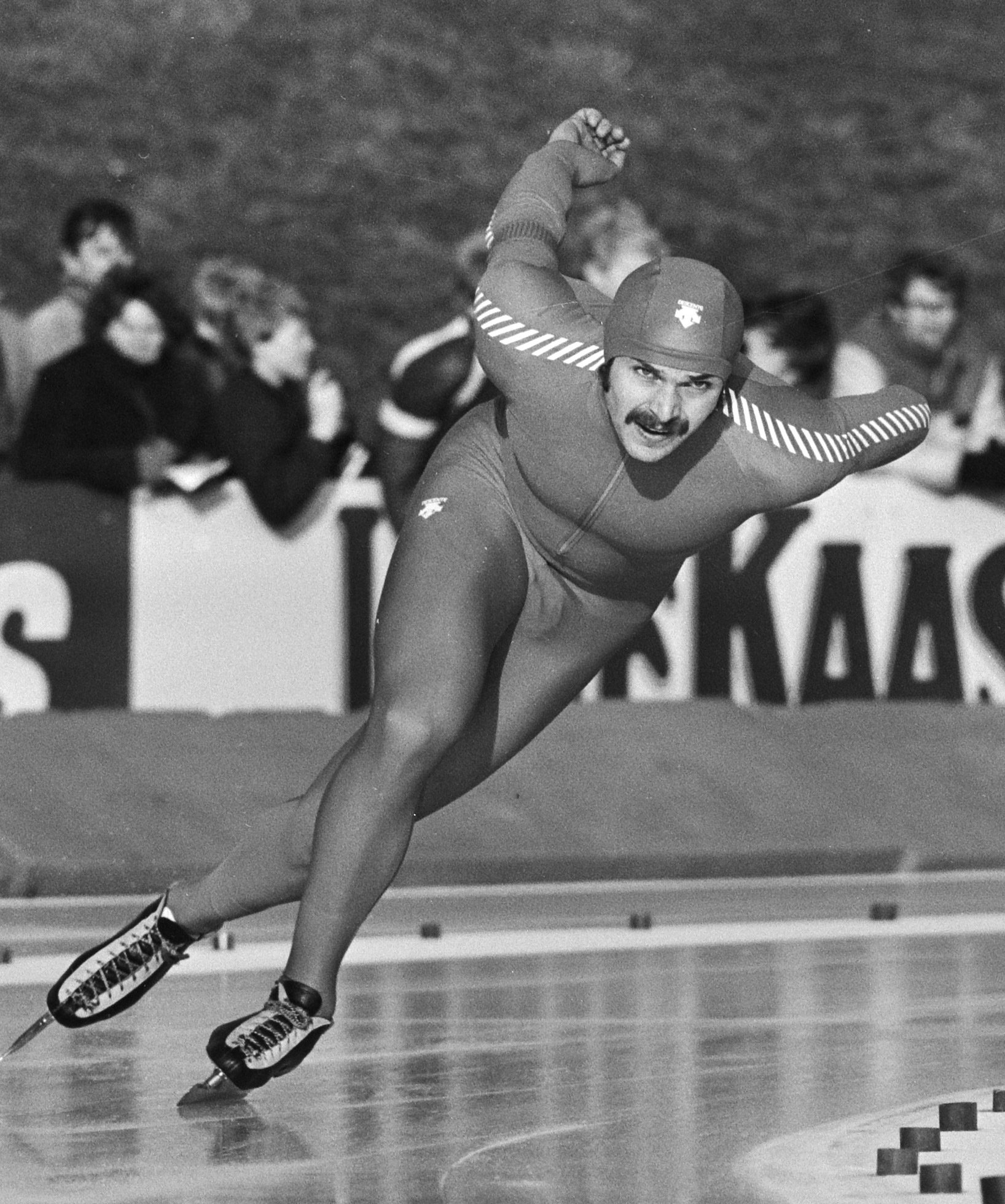

Personal information
- Born: 7 July 1959 (age 66) Trondheim, Norway

Sport
- Country: Norway
- Sport: Men's speed skating
- Club: Leinstrand IL, Oslo IL, ASK
Medal record
Men's speed skating
Representing Norway
Olympic Games
Bronze medal – third place	1980 Lake Placid	1,000 m
World Sprint Championships
Gold medal – first place	1981 Grenoble	Sprint
Silver medal – second place	1978 Lake Placid	Sprint
Bronze medal – third place	1979 Inzell	Sprint
Bronze medal – third place	1982 Alkmaar	Sprint

Frode Rønning (born 7 July 1959) is a former speed skater and coach from Norway.

During many speed skating seasons, Rønning was the Norway's best sprinter. Rønning participated in the 13 sprint world championships between 1977 and 1989, he became champion in 1981, and won silver in 1978 and bronze in 1979 and 1982. He has participated in three olympics; in 1980 Olympics in Lake Placid he won a bronze medal on the 1000 m and came fourth on the 500 m at the 1984 Olympics in Sarajevo he came 7th in the 500 m, and at the 1988 Olympics in Calgary he came 10th in the 500 m.

Frode Rønning has nine Norwegian sprint championships in total 3 on the 500 m and 2 on the 1000 m. As a junior, he sat 6 junior world records on 500 m, 1000 m and overall sprint. He first skated for Leinstrand IL and later for Oslo IL and ASK (Arbeidernes Skøyteklubb – later called Aktiv Skøyteklubb). Personal records: 37.31 - 1:15.54 - 1:59.82
