= Ron Richards (ski jumper) =

Canadian ski jumper

Ron Richards (born June 5, 1963, in Oshawa, Ontario) is a Canadian former ski jumper. He represented the Canadian national team at the 1984 Winter Olympics in Sarajevo, Yugoslavia; the 1988 Winter Olympics in Calgary, Canada; and the 1992 Winter Olympics in Albertville, France. Richards is also an avid golfer.
