= Gaétan Boucher =

Canadian speed skater

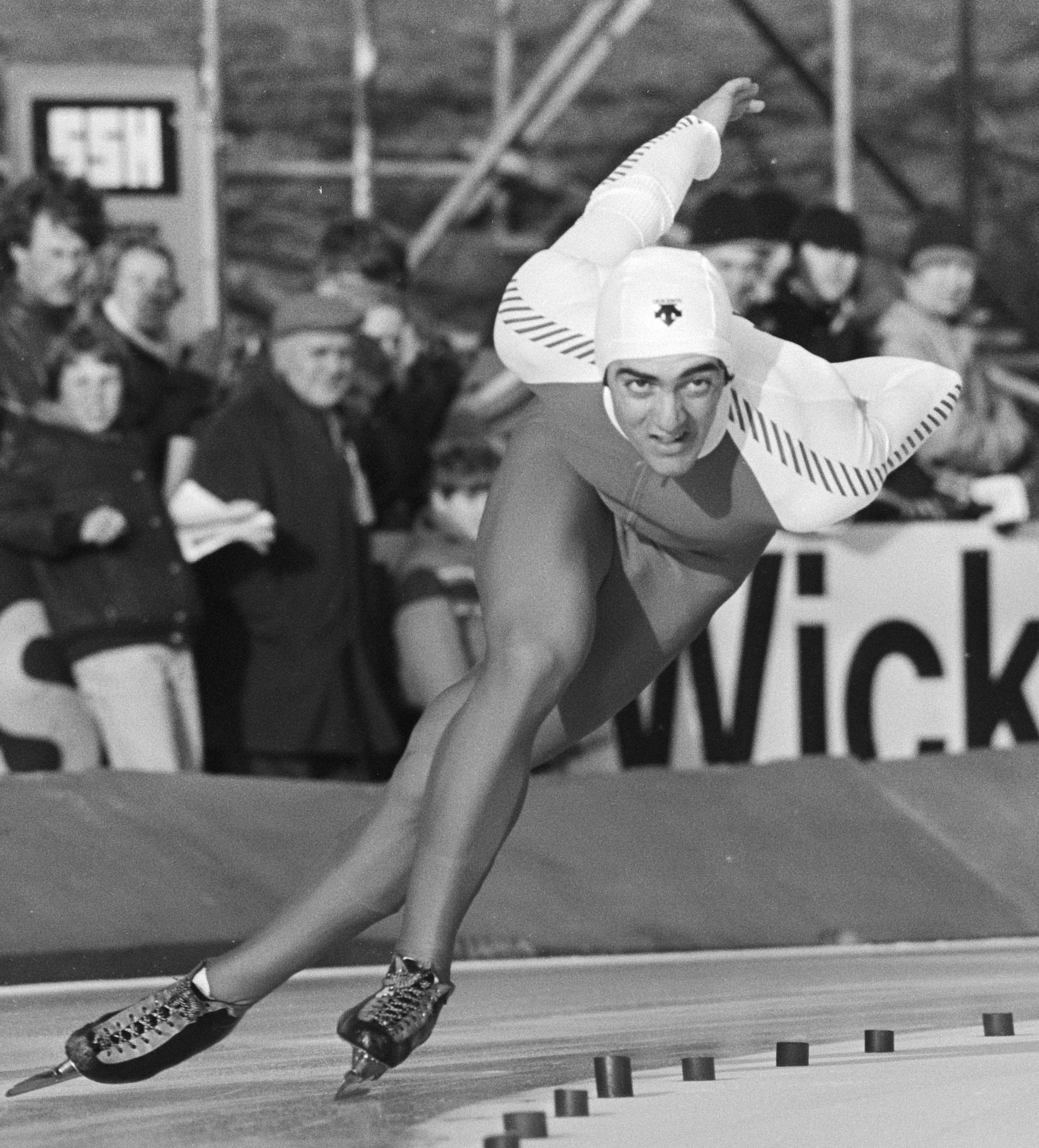
- Boucher in 1982

Personal information
- Born: May 10, 1958 (age 68) Charlesbourg, Quebec City, Canada
- Height: 1.71 m (5 ft 7 in)
- Weight: 72 kg (159 lb)

Sport
- Sport: Speed Skating
- Club: Skating Club Norbec; Skating Club Montréal
Medal record
Representing Canada
Men's speed skating
Olympic Games
Gold medal – first place	1984 Sarajevo	1000 m
Gold medal – first place	1984 Sarajevo	1500 m
Silver medal – second place	1980 Lake Placid	1000 m
Bronze medal – third place	1984 Sarajevo	500 m
World Sprint Championships
Gold medal – first place	1984 Trondheim	Sprint
Silver medal – second place	1979 Inzell	Sprint
Silver medal – second place	1980 West Allis	Sprint
Silver medal – second place	1982 Alkmaar	Sprint
Silver medal – second place	1985 Heerenveen	Sprint
Men's Short track speed skating
World Championships
Gold medal – first place	1977 Grenoble	Overall
Gold medal – first place	1980 Milan	Overall
Silver medal – second place	1976 Champaign	Overall
Silver medal – second place	1977 Grenoble	500 m
Silver medal – second place	1977 Grenoble	1000 m
Silver medal – second place	1981 Meudon	Overall
Silver medal – second place	1982 Moncton	Overall

Gaétan T. Boucher OC CQ (born May 10, 1958) is a former Canadian speed skating Olympic champion.

== Biography ==
Boucher first trained in ice hockey, the leading sport in Canada but then changed to speed skating after winning a national title in 1972. In 1976 he took part in his first Olympics, finishing sixth in the 1000 m and setting an Olympic record in the process. In 1980 he was second in the same event, after Eric Heiden (who won all the gold medals at that event), collecting one of only two Canadian medals at those Games. He broke his ankle and had a long illness in 1983, but recovered for the 1984 Olympics, where he was the Canadian flag bearer and won three medals, the most medals for a Canadian athlete at one Olympics (since bettered by Cindy Klassen). With his gold medals in the 1000 m and 1500 m events he also became the first Canadian male to win an individual gold medal at the Winter Olympics. He retired shortly after the 1988 Games, where his best result was fifth place in the 1000 m.

A champion at the 1984 World Sprint Championships and winner of six World Championship events from 1981 to 1985, he was made a Member of the Order of Canada in 1983 and promoted to Officer the following year. In 1984 he won the Oscar Mathisen Award, given annually for exemplary speed skating performance, and the Lou Marsh Trophy, given annually to Canada's top athlete and was inducted into the Canada Sports Hall of Fame. The following year was made a Knight of the National Order of Quebec. Since his retirement, he has worked as a French-language broadcaster and designed skates for Bauer. He was ranked number 10 on Canada's Athletes of the 20th Century and continues to inspire speed skaters in Canada.

A four-time Olympic medalist, Boucher was awarded the Lou Marsh Trophy as Canada's outstanding male athlete of 1984. He was named number 10 on the list of Canada's Athletes of the 20th Century. In 1983, he was made a Member of the Order of Canada and was promoted to Officer in 1984. In 1985, he was made a Knight of the National Order of Quebec.

Boucher held the Canadian record for most medals won at a single Olympics, winning three at the 1984 Winter Olympics. This was surpassed by Cindy Klassen at the 2006 Winter Olympics, who won five. He was World Sprint Champion in 1984, as well as runner-up four times.

Boucher's career coincided with that of Eric Heiden, and Boucher finished runner-up to Heiden in both the 1979 and 1980 World Sprint Championship. After Heiden's retirement at age 22, Boucher was among the favourites for the 1981 World Sprint Championship, but after the first day's events he was third. He then crashed out of the championship with a fall on the 500 m, and despite beating champion Frode Rønning by 1.61 seconds on the final 1000 m, he had no chance to finish anything but last. Three years later, however, he did win the title, requiring to beat Sergey Khlebnikov by 0.47 seconds on the final 1000 m; he won by 0.49 and secured the title by 0.01 of a samalog point, capping a season which also included two Olympic golds.

He is the father of ice hockey player Jean-Francois Boucher.

== World records ==
Discipline	Time	Date	Location
1000 m	1.13,39	January 31, 1981	(Switzerland) Davos
Sprint combination	148.785	30-31 January, 1981	(Switzerland) Davos

Source: SpeedSkatingStats.com

== See also ==
- List of Canadian sports personalities

Awards
Preceded by Rolf Falk-Larssen	Oscar Mathisen Award; 1984	Succeeded by Hein Vergeer
