= Viktor Shasherin =

Soviet speed skater

Personal information
- Nationality: Russian
- Born: Viktor Vladimirovich Shasherin; 23 February 1962 (age 64) Alma-Ata, Kazakh SSR, Soviet Union
- Height: 1.85 m (6 ft 1 in)
- Weight: 83 kg (183 lb)

Sport
- Country: Soviet Union
- Sport: Speed skating
- Turned pro: 1981
- Retired: 1989

Achievements and titles
- Personal best(s): 500 m: 37.59 (1984); 1000 m: 1:13.83 (1982); 1500 m: 1:52.29 (1989); 5000 m: 6:49.15 (1984); 10 000 m: 14:25.29 (1982)

Viktor Vladimirovich Shasherin (Russian: Виктор Владимирович Шашерин; born 23 July 1962) is a former Soviet speedskater.

He set world record in 5,000 m in Medeo in 1984, with the time 6:49.15.

He set world record in 3,000 m in Davos in 1986, with the time 4:03.22.

== World records ==
Discipline	Time	Date	Location
Big combination	161.550	26 March 1983	Medeo
5000 m	6.49,15	23 March 1984	Medeo
Big combination	160.807	24 March 1984	Medeo
3000 m	4.03,22	18 January 1986	Davos

Source: SpeedSkatingStats.com
