= Zetra Ice Rink =

Sports venue in Sarajevo

Coordinates: 43.870403°N 18.409138°E

- Interactive map of Zetra Ice Rink
- Location: Sarajevo, Bosnia and Herzegovina

Construction
- Groundbreaking: 1981
- Built: 1982

The Zetra Ice Rink or Zetra Stadium (Bosnian: Olimpijska Dvorana Zetra) is an outdoor venue located in Sarajevo, Bosnia and Herzegovina. Constructed between 1981 and 1982, it hosted the speed skating events for the 1984 Winter Olympics.

This venue is located near the Olympic Hall Juan Antonio Samaranch, formerly known as the Zetra Ice Rink.
