= Kim Song-hui (speed skater) =

North Korean speed skater (born 1965)

- Born: 24 February 1965 (age 61)
- Occupation: Speed skater

Korean name
- Hangul: 김성희
- RR: Gim Seonghui
- MR: Kim Sŏnghŭi

Kim Song-hui (born 24 February 1965) is a North Korean speed skater. He competed at the 1984 Winter Olympics.
