= Jouko =

Jouko is a masculine Finnish given name and may refer to:

- Jouko Ahola (born 1970), Finnish strongman, powerlifter and actor
- Jouko Grip (born 1949), Finnish paralympic athlete
- Jouko Halmekoski (born 1937), Finnish writer
- Jouko Hassi (born 1959), Finnish sprinter
- Jouko Jääskeläinen (born 1952), Finnish politician
- Jouko Jokisalo, Finnish communist and KGB spy
- Jouko Karjalainen (born 1956), Finnish Nordic combined skier
- Jouko Keskinen (born 1950), Finnish actor
- Jouko Kuha (born 1939), Finnish long-distance runner
- Jouko Leppä (born 1943), Finnish super-heavyweight weightlifter
- Jouko Lindgrén (born 1955), Finnish sailor
- Jouko Lindstedt (born 1955), Finnish linguist
- Jouko Parviainen (born 1958), Finnish Nordic combined skier
- Jouko Salomäki (born 1962), Finnish Greco-Roman wrestler
- Jouko Törmänen (1954–2015), Finnish ski jumper
- Jouko Turkka (1942–2016), Finnish theater director
- Jouko Vesterlund (born 1959), Finnish speed skater
- Jouko Viitamäki (born 1949), Finnish sprint canoer
- Jouko Pohjanpalo (1908–1992), Finnish electrical engineer
