= Finland at the 1984 Winter Olympics =

- IOC code: FIN
- NOC: Finnish Olympic Committee
- Website: sport.fi/olympiakomitea (in Finnish and Swedish)

in Sarajevo
- Competitors: 45 (40 men, 5 women) in 6 sports
- Flag bearers: Jorma Valtonen, ice hockey
- Medals Ranked 4th: Gold 4 Silver 3 Bronze 6 Total 13

Winter Olympics appearances (overview)
- 1924; 1928; 1932; 1936; 1948; 1952; 1956; 1960; 1964; 1968; 1972; 1976; 1980; 1984; 1988; 1992; 1994; 1998; 2002; 2006; 2010; 2014; 2018; 2022; 2026

Finland competed at the 1984 Winter Olympics in Sarajevo, Yugoslavia.

== Medalists ==
Medal	Name	Sport	Event
Gold	Marja-Liisa Hämäläinen	Cross-country skiing	Women's 5 km
Gold	Marja-Liisa Hämäläinen	Cross-country skiing	Women's 10 km
Gold	Marja-Liisa Hämäläinen	Cross-country skiing	Women's 20 km
Gold	Matti Nykänen	Ski jumping	Men's large hill (K120 individual 90m)
Silver	Aki Karvonen	Cross-country skiing	Men's 15 km
Silver	Jouko Karjalainen	Nordic combined	Men's individual
Silver	Matti Nykänen	Ski jumping	Men's normal hill (K90 individual 70m)
Bronze	Harri Kirvesniemi	Cross-country skiing	Men's 15 km
Bronze	Juha Mieto; Aki Karvonen; Harri Kirvesniemi; Kari Ristanen	Cross-country skiing	Men's 4 × 10 km relay
Bronze	Aki Karvonen	Cross-country skiing	Men's 50 km
Bronze	Eija Hyytiäinen; Marja-Liisa Hämäläinen; Marjo Matikainen; Pirkko Määttä	Cross-country skiing	Women's 4 × 5 km relay
Bronze	Jukka Ylipulli	Nordic combined	Men's individual
Bronze	Jari Puikkonen	Ski jumping	Men's normal hill (K90 individual 70m)

== Biathlon ==
Men

Event	Athlete	Misses ^{1}	Time	Rank
10 km Sprint	Risto Punkka	4	34:28.5	34
10 km Sprint	Tapio Piipponen	1	32:28.7	15
10 km Sprint	Toivo Mäkikyrö	2	32:22.5	13

Event	Athlete	Time	Penalties	Adjusted time ^{2}	Rank
20 km	Keijo Tiitola	1'14:32.8	5	1'19:32.8	18
20 km	Arto Jääskeläinen	1'14:23.3	5	1'19:23.3	16
20 km	Tapio Piipponen	1'12:38.4	6	1'18:38.4	12

Men's 4 x 7.5 km relay

Athletes	Race		
Athletes	Misses ^{1}	Time	Rank
Keijo Tiitola; Toivo Mäkikyrö; Arto Jääskeläinen; Tapio Piipponen	2	1'43:16.0	7

^{1} A penalty loop of 150 metres had to be skied per missed target.
^{2} One minute added per missed target.

== Cross-country skiing ==
Men

Event	Athlete	Race	
Event	Athlete	Time	Rank
15 km	Kari Härkönen	42:49.3	13
15 km	Juha Mieto	42:05.8	4
15 km	Harri Kirvesniemi	41:45.6	3rd place, bronze medalist(s)
15 km	Aki Karvonen	41:34.9	2nd place, silver medalist(s)
30 km	Kari Ristanen	1'33:02.6	17
30 km	Juha Mieto	1'31:48.3	8
30 km	Harri Kirvesniemi	1'31:37.4	7
30 km	Aki Karvonen	1'30:59.7	5
50 km	Kari Ristanen	2'23:10.6	15
50 km	Juha Mieto	2'21:53.1	10
50 km	Harri Kirvesniemi	2'18:34.1	4
50 km	Aki Karvonen	2'17:04.7	3rd place, bronze medalist(s)

Men's 4 × 10 km relay

Athletes	Race	
Athletes	Time	Rank
Kari Ristanen; Juha Mieto; Harri Kirvesniemi; Aki Karvonen	1'56:31.4	3rd place, bronze medalist(s)

Women

Event	Athlete	Race	
Event	Athlete	Time	Rank
5 km	Marjo Matikainen	18:21.6	22
5 km	Eija Hyytiäinen	18:11.6	19
5 km	Pirkko Määttä	17:48.0	10
5 km	Marja-Liisa Hämäläinen	17:04.0	1st place, gold medalist(s)
10 km	Erja Kuivalainen	35:35.2	37
10 km	Eija Hyytiäinen	34:33.8	25
10 km	Pirkko Määttä	34:13.4	19
10 km	Marja-Liisa Hämäläinen	31:44.2	1st place, gold medalist(s)
20 km	Erja Kuivalainen	1'07:26.4	29
20 km	Eija Hyytiäinen	1'05:38.8	17
20 km	Pirkko Määttä	1'04:37.6	9
20 km	Marja-Liisa Hämäläinen	1'01:45.0	1st place, gold medalist(s)

Women's 4 × 5 km relay

Athletes	Race	
Athletes	Time	Rank
Pirkko Määttä; Eija Hyytiäinen; Marjo Matikainen; Marja-Liisa Hämäläinen	1'07:36.7	3rd place, bronze medalist(s)

== Ice hockey ==
=== Group B ===
Top two teams (shaded ones) advanced to the medal round.

Team	Pld	W	L	T	GF	GA	Pts
Czechoslovakia	5	5	0	0	38	7	10
Canada	5	4	1	0	24	10	8
Finland	5	2	2	1	27	19	5
United States	5	1	2	2	16	17	4
Austria	5	1	4	0	13	37	2
Norway	5	0	4	1	15	43	1

- Finland 4-3 Austria
- Finland 16-2 Norway
- Canada 4-2 Finland
- Czechoslovakia 7-2 Finland
- Finland 3-3 USA

=== Game for 5th Place ===
Team 1	Score	Team 2
West Germany	7–4	Finland

=== Leading scorers ===
Rk	Team	GP	G	A	Pts
4th	Raimo Summanen	6	4	7	11
6th	Petri Skriko	6	6	4	10

- Team roster
  - Kari Takko
  - Jorma Valtonen
  - Timo Jutila
  - Markus Lehto
  - Petteri Lehto
  - Pertti Lehtonen
  - Arto Ruotanen
  - Simo Saarinen
  - Ville Sirén
  - Raimo Helminen
  - Risto Jalo
  - Arto Javanainen
  - Erkki Laine
  - Anssi Melametsä
  - Jarmo Mäkitalo
  - Hannu Oksanen
  - Arto Sirviö
  - Petri Skriko
  - Raimo Summanen
  - Harri Tuohimaa
- Head coaches: Alpo Suhonen and Reino Ruotsalainen

== Nordic combined ==
Events:

- normal hill ski jumping (Three jumps, best two counted and shown here.)
- 15 km cross-country skiing

Athlete	Event	Ski Jumping				Cross-country			Total	
Athlete	Event	Distance 1	Distance 2	Points	Rank	Time	Points	Rank	Points	Rank
Rauno Miettinen	Individual	79.5	86.0	205.5	6	49:02.2	197.470	9	402.970	4
Jouko Karjalainen	Individual	83.0	83.0	196.9	15	46:32.0	220.000	1	416.900	2nd place, silver medalist(s)
Jukka Ylipulli	Individual	84.0	86.0	208.3	5	48:28.5	202.525	5	410.825	3rd place, bronze medalist(s)

== Ski jumping ==
Athlete	Event	Jump 1		Jump 2		Total	
Athlete	Event	Distance	Points	Distance	Points	Points	Rank
Markku Pusenius	Normal hill	79.5	89.2	85.0	99.0	188.2	20
Jari Puikkonen	Normal hill	81.5	95.4	91.5	117.4	212.8	3rd place, bronze medalist(s)
Pentti Kokkonen	Normal hill	84.0	101.4	84.0	99.9	201.3	12
Matti Nykänen	Normal hill	91.0	114.1	84.0	99.9	214.0	2nd place, silver medalist(s)
Pentti Kokkonen	Large hill	98.5	90.1	99.0	92.3	182.4	14
Markku Pusenius	Large hill	100.5	93.4	97.0	87.5	180.9	16
Jari Puikkonen	Large hill	103.5	100.1	102.0	96.5	196.6	5
Matti Nykänen	Large hill	116.0	119.1	111.0	112.1	231.2	1st place, gold medalist(s)

== Speed skating ==
Men

Event	Athlete	Race	
Event	Athlete	Time	Rank
500 m	Urpo Pikkupeura	39.88	27
500 m	Jouko Vesterlund	39.15	17
1000 m	Urpo Pikkupeura	1:19.13	23
1000 m	Jouko Vesterlund	1:18.12	12
1500 m	Pertti Niittylä	2:00.01	9
5000 m	Pertti Niittylä	7:17.97	6
10,000 m	Pertti Niittylä	15:15.18	18
