= Igman Olympic Jumps =

Ski jumping hill on the mountain of Igman in Ilidža, Sarajevo

Coordinates: 43°46′06″N 18°15′02″E

- Malo Polje
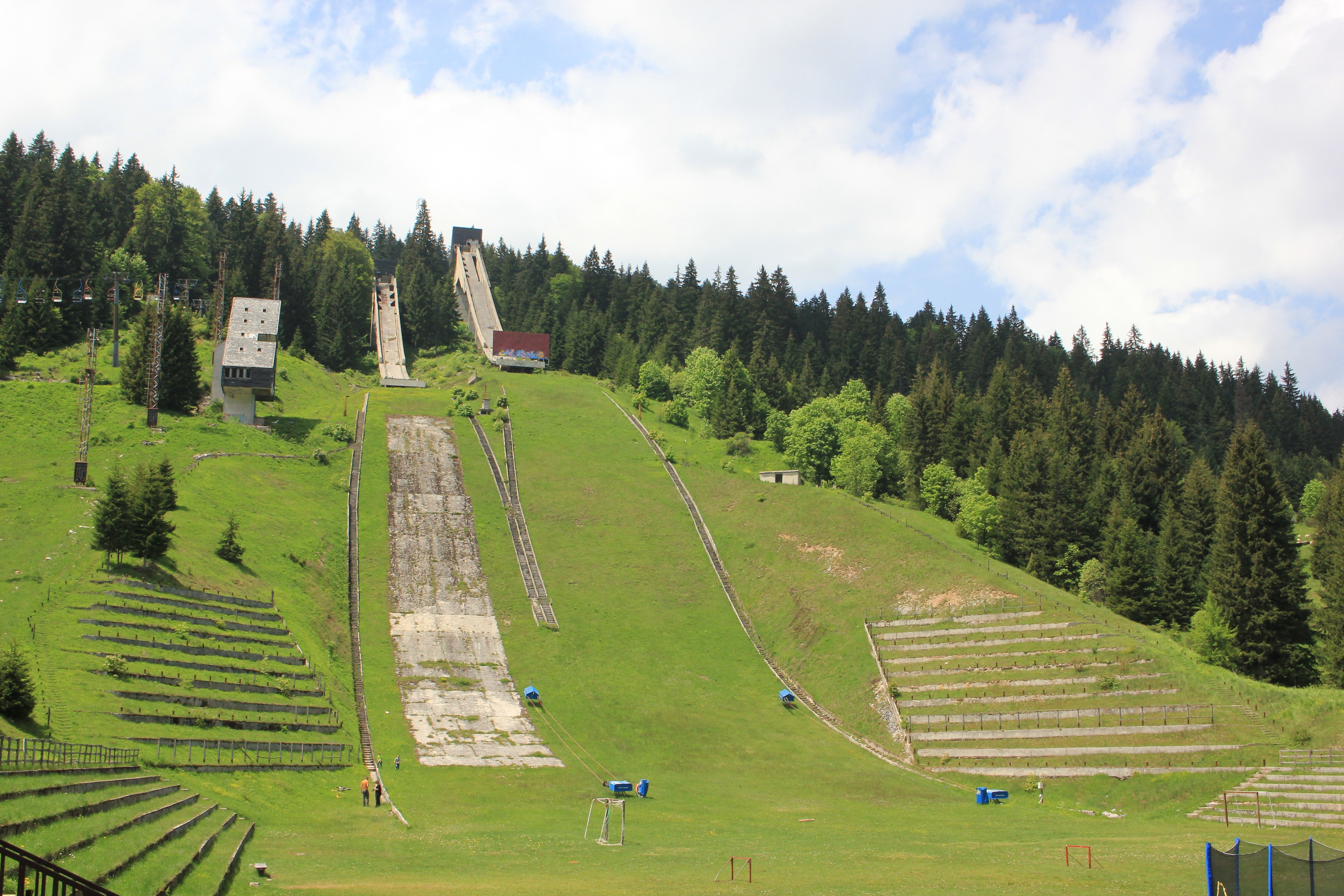
- Igman Olympic Jumps in May 2018
- Location: Sarajevo; Bosnia and Herzegovina
- Opened: 1982

Size
- K–point: K-90; K-112
- Hill record: Matti Nykänen (116.0 m in 1984); Primož Ulaga (95.0 m in 1983)

Top events
- Olympics: 1984

Igman Olympic Jumps, also known as Malo Polje, is a defunct ski jumping hill on the mountain of Igman in Ilidža, Sarajevo, Bosnia and Herzegovina. It consists of a large hill with a construction point (K-point) of 112 meters (367 ft) and a normal hill with a K-point of 90 meters (295 ft). Construction started in 1980 and the venue opened in 1982 to host ski jumping and Nordic combined at the 1984 Winter Olympics. The large hill event saw Finland's Matti Nykänen set the hill record of 116.0 meters (381 ft) in front of 90,000 spectators. No other International Ski Federation (FIS) sanctioned competitions have taken place at the hills. During the Siege of Sarajevo, the hills became a battleground and have since not been used. However, there are plans to rebuild the in-run, expand the large hill and build new spectator stands and visitor facilities.

== History ==
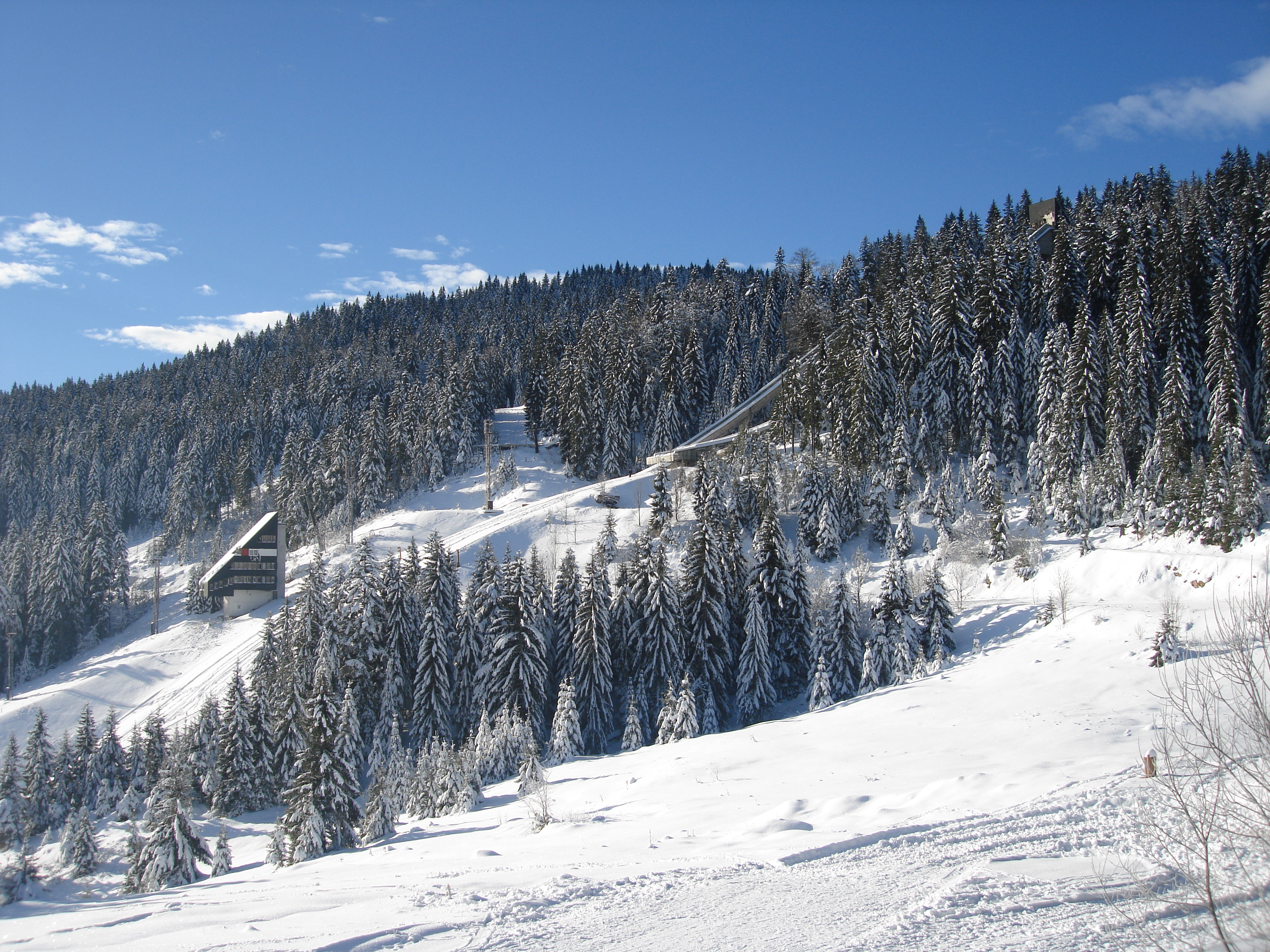
The jumps during winter

The Malo Polje area of Igman has traditionally been used for recreational cross-country skiing. During Sarajevo's Olympic bid, the two ski jumps were proposed as separate venues. However, after the games were awarded, the plans changed in favor of a single venue, which would allow better post-Olympic use. The area plan for the jumps were presented by the Organizing Committee's executive board on 30 April 1979 and was passed by Sarajevo City Council in September 1979. The design of the ski jump was approved by FIS on 18 October 1979. Work on auxiliary infrastructure started in mid-1979, including a new road from the city to Igman.

Construction of the hill and judge's tower started on 1 July 1980 and was completed on 1 December 1982. Construction of the ski lift started on 1 October 1982 and was completed on 30 October 1983. The jumps were inaugurated in 1983. After the Olympics, Sarajevo experienced a boom in recreational skiing among locals, including ski jumping.

During the Siege of Sarajevo, Igman became part of the buffer zone between the belligerents of the Bosnian government and the Army of Republika Srpska. The area around the ski jumping hill saw heavy fighting during the civil war and was also used for executions by the Army of the Republic of Bosnia and Herzegovina (ARBiH). Since, the structures have been littered with bullet holes. With the war, the hills were no longer able to be used.

In 2010, the Olympic legacy company ZOI'84, which owns the hills, launched plans to renovate the venue. Estimated to cost between €7 million and €10 million, the in-runs would have been completely rebuilt, as they are in too poor condition to be renovated. The large hill would be expanded to give a K-point of 120 meters (390 ft). Designs have been made by Austrian architect firm Hofrichter-Ritter and financing is planned through European Union or Austrian grants. The project includes natural stands on the sides of the landing slope and a combination of permanent and temporary stands around the out-run. At a later date, part of stands could be covered with a roof. A panorama restaurant has been proposed for the top of the in-runs. The new venue was scheduled to open in 2013; however, no work was done and the site is mostly derelict.

== Facilities ==
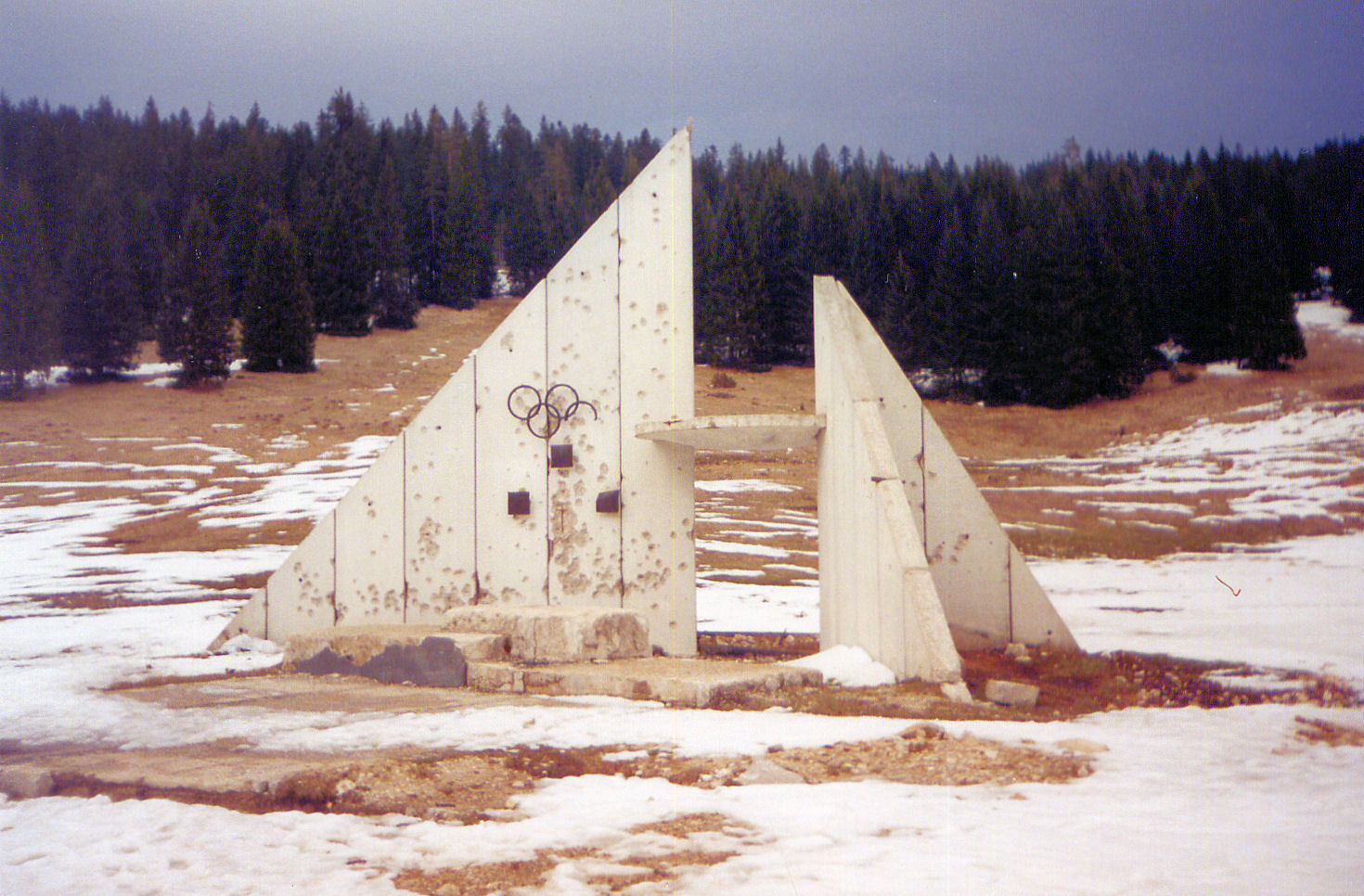
During the Siege of Sarajevo, the Olympic podium was used as a site for executions and was filled with bullet holes. It has since been repaired

The large hill has a construction point (K-point) of 112 meters (367 ft) and the normal hill of 90 meters (295 ft). During the Olympics, 45,000 people attended the normal hill event while 90,000 spectated the large hill event. The large hill record jump of 116.0 meters (381 ft) was set by Matti Nykänen during the Olympics. The normal hill record of 95.0 meters (312 ft) was set by Yugoslavia's Primož Ulaga in 1983.

== Events ==
=== Men ===
Date	Size	Competition	Winner	Second	Third
12 February 1984	K-90	OG / WC	(East Germany) Jens Weißflog	(Finland) Matti Nykänen	(Finland) Jari Puikkonen
18 February 1984	K-112	OG / WC	(Finland) Matti Nykänen	(East Germany) Jens Weißflog	(Czechoslovakia) Pavel Ploc

The only FIS-sanctioned event to take place at Igman was ski jumping and Nordic combined at the 1984 Winter Olympics. The ski jumping competitions doubled as a part of the FIS Ski Jumping World Cup. The normal hill event was won by East Germany's Jens Weißflog ahead of Nykänen. The two reversed top places in the large hill event. The Nordic combined event was won by Norway's Tom Sandberg ahead of Finland's Jouko Karjalainen and Jukka Ylipulli.

Igman was included in the Sarajevo bid for the 2010 Winter Olympics. Despite Sarajevo being the only previous host city to bid, it was largely regarded as the weakest bid, primarily due to its lack of infrastructure after the war.
