= Frak =

Frak may refer to:

- Frak, profanity from the science-fiction franchise Battlestar Galactica
- Vladimír Frák (born 1961), Slovak skier
- Frak!, a scrolling platform video game programmed by Nick Pelling for the BBC Micro
- Kapoteh (also frak), a long black frock coat worn by married Chabad instead of a bekishe

== See also ==
- Frac (disambiguation)
- Frack (disambiguation)
- Frakk, the Cats' Nightmare, a Hungarian television show
- Phrack, an e-zine written by and for hackers
