= Frack =

Frack may refer to:

- Frick and Frack (1919–2008), nicknames for an ice skating duo
- Fracking, to use the hydraulic fracturing method for extracting oil and natural gas
- SS Fråck (1869), a Russian ship sunk in 1915 by a German submarine

== See also ==
- Frac (disambiguation)
- Frak (disambiguation)
- Frakk, a fictional Hungarian cartoon character
- Phrack, an ezine for hackers
