= Venues of the 1984 Winter Olympics =

For the 1984 Winter Olympics in Sarajevo, Yugoslavia (now Bosnia and Herzegovina), a total of nine sports venues were used. The idea for the Games came around from a 1968 Organisation for Economic Co-operation and Development study on promoting winter tourism in Yugoslavia. After Sarajevo was awarded the 1984 Games in 1978, venue construction and renovation took place between 1979 and 1983. Weather postponed the men's downhill alpine skiing event three times before it was finally run. The men's cross-country skiing 30 km event was run during a blizzard. After the games, all but one of the venues were damaged during the Bosnian War and the siege of Sarajevo. After the war, Zetra Ice Hall was rebuilt and is in use as of 2010.

== Venues ==
Venue	Sports	Capacity	Ref.
Bjelašnica	Alpine skiing (men)	Not listed.	
Igman, Malo Polje	Nordic combined (ski jumping), Ski jumping	Not listed.	
Igman, Veliko Polje	Biathlon, Cross-country skiing, Nordic combined (Cross-country skiing)	Not listed.	
Jahorina	Alpine skiing (women)	Not listed.	
Koševo Stadium	Opening ceremonies	50,000	
Skenderija II Hall	Ice hockey	8,500|	
Trebević Bobsleigh and Luge Track	Bobsleigh, Luge	4,000 (luge); 7,500 (bobsleigh)	
Zetra Ice Hall	Closing ceremonies, Figure skating, Ice hockey (final)	15,000	
Zetra Ice Rink	Speed skating	Not listed	

== Before the Olympics ==
During the reign of the Ottoman Empire, Sarajevo was a popular venue for the forerunner of luge. When the Austro-Hungarian Empire controlled Sarajevo, modern luge, skating, and skiing was introduced. Between the first and second World Wars, ski jumps and a mountain lodge were constructed along with the first Yugoslav ski rally at Jahorina in 1937. After World War II, Jahorina in Sarajevo hosted the International Students Winter Week in 1955, a forerunner to the Winter Universiade that would start five years later in Chamonix, France. A 1968 Organisation for Economic Co-operation and Development study on developing winter tourism in Yugoslavia would serve as a catalyst for a bid for the Winter Olympics. Sarajevo made their bid for the 1984 Winter Games in late 1976 and were awarded the 1984 Games in May 1978. Koševo Stadium which was used for the opening ceremonies was constructed in 1952, renovated in 1966, and renovated again in 1983 in time for the 1984 Winter Olympics. Skenderija II was constructed in 1969. Design and construction for new and existing facilities took place between 1979 and 1983 though a majority of the venues were built completely by 1981.

Yugoslavia hosted the World Ice Hockey Championships in 1966 though those championships took place in Ljubljana (now in Slovenia). Sarajevo had its first FIS Alpine Skiing World Cup event in 1975 with a women's giant slalom event.

== During the Olympics ==
At the Zetra Ice Rink during practice for the ice dance event the morning before the free dance final, Jayne Torvill and Christopher Dean of Great Britain arrived early to prepare. At the end of their routine, they were met with applause from the 20 to 30 venue workers who were cleaning the seats and had stopped working to watch Torvill and Dean practice.

Weather postponed the men's downhill three times before it was run finally. Bill Johnson of the United States won the event. Nikolay Zimyatov of the Soviet Union won the 30 km cross-country skiing event that took place in a blizzard.

== After the Olympics ==
Sarajevo hosted an Alpine Skiing World Cup in March 1987 won by Luxembourg's Marc Girardelli for the men's giant slalom and a tie between Swiss skiers Maria Walliser and Vreni Schneider for the women's giant slalom. The Zetra Ice Hall played host to the European Figure Skating Championships in 1987. Before the Yugoslav Wars of 1991, the last major winter sports event before the breakup of Yugoslavia was the European Speed Skating Championships that year.

From 1991 to 1995, the Yugoslav Wars took place that involved independent movements in Bosnia, Croatia, and Slovenia, occurring in 1992–95, 1991–95, and 1991 respectively. The Bosnian War that lasted from 1992 to 1995 that included the siege of Sarajevo which itself lasted from 1992 to 1996. At the early part of the war and the siege, the bobsleigh and luge track was transformed into a field artillery position for Bosnian Serb guerillas, the men's alpine skiing venue was a Bosnian Serb military installation, and the Zetra Ice Hall was reduced to rubble. During the closing ceremonies of the 1994 Winter Olympics in Lillehammer, IOC President Juan Antonio Samaranch remarked about Sarajevo's situation and the concern for global athletes to assist in the conflict.

After the Bosnian War and the siege of Sarajevo, Zetra Ice Hall (now known as Olympic Hall Juan Antonio Samaranch) was rebuilt in 1997 and reopened in 1999. The Jahorina ski resort area where women's alpine skiing took place was the only venue unaffected by the war. There was hope that Sarajevo would bid for the 2010 Winter Olympics in a sign they had recovered, but the city did not make the finalist list for those Games.
