= Hurschler =

Hurschler is a surname. Notable people with the surname include:

- Andreas Hurschler (born 1977), Swiss Nordic combined skier
- Seppi Hurschler (born 1983), Swiss Nordic combined skier
- Walter Hurschler (born 1959), Swiss Nordic combined skier
