= Frac =

Frac or FRAC may refer to:

- Frac or fraccing, short name for Hydraulic fracturing, a method for extracting oil and natural gas
- FRAC Act, United States legislation proposed in 2009 to regulate hydraulic fracturing
- Frac module, a format for the MOTM modular synthesizer
- Frac pacs, packaged ground coffee for coffee machines
- Frac Press, an imprint of OmniScriptum devoted to the reproduction of Wikipedia content
- Frac(R), mathematical notation for field of fractions, the smallest field in which an integral domain can be embedded
- Fonds régional d'art contemporain (FRAC), a network of 23 public collections of contemporary art across France
- Fleet Replacement Aircrew Training, an advanced training option for aircrewmen in the U.S. Navy
- Formula Regional Americas Championship, regional Formula 3 championship
- Formula Regional Asian Championship, regional Formula 3 championship
- Front for the Alternance and Change, a party coalition formed during the Togolese presidential election, 2010
- Fungicide Resistance Action Committee, an organization for fungicide management

== See also ==
- Frack (disambiguation)
- Frak (disambiguation)
- Frakk, a fictional Hungarian cartoon character
- FRACS, Fellow of the Royal Australasian College of Surgeons, in Australia and New Zealand
- Phrack, an ezine for hackers
