= FK Željezničar Sarajevo in European football =

Association football club in Sarajevo, Bosnia and Herzegovina

- Club: FK Željezničar Sarajevo
- First entry: 1963 Mitropa Cup
- Latest entry: 2025–26 UEFA Conference League

Titles
- Europa League: SF: 1984–85

Fudbalski klub Željezničar Sarajevo is a professional football club based in Sarajevo, Bosnia and Herzegovina.

The first ever involvement of the club in European competitions was in the 1963 Mitropa Cup. Željezničar's 1984–85 UEFA Cup semi-final elimination remains the most successful European campaign by any club from Bosnia and Herzegovina.

== History ==
FK Željezničar Sarajevo is a professional football club based in Grbavica in Novo Sarajevo; a municipality in the capital city Sarajevo, Bosnia and Herzegovina. The club's first ever European match was against Austria Wien in the 1963 Mitropa Cup. Željezničar is most famous for becoming the first Bosnian football club to reach both the UEFA Cup (now named UEFA Europa League) semi-finals during the 1984–85 season and the quarter-finals during the 1971–72 season, and one of the first few clubs ever to do so from the former Yugoslavia.

In modern times, the clubs best finish in European competitions was reaching the 2002–03 Champions League third qualifying round, losing to Newcastle United.

From 1998 to 2015, Željezničar played its home European matches at the nation's largest Olympic stadium, Asim Ferhatović Hase Stadium (also known as the Koševo Stadium), as their traditional home stadium, Grbavica Stadium, did not meet UEFA requirements. Since recent renovations at Grbavica, the club has been playing its home matches back at their home ground since July 2017.

== European record ==
As of 17 July 2025

Competition	P	W	D	L	GF	GA	GD
European Cup / Champions League	16	4	1	11	13	31	−18
UEFA Cup / Europa League	55	21	14	20	71	67	+4
Conference League	6	1	3	2	8	11	–4
Total	77	26	18	33	92	109	−17

P = Matches played; W = Matches won; D = Matches drawn; L = Matches lost; GF = Goals for; GA = Goals against; GD = Goals difference. Defunct competitions indicated in italics.

Best results in European competitions

Season	Achievement	Notes
UEFA Cup
1971–72	Quarter-final	eliminated on penalties by (Hungary) Ferencváros 2–1 in Budapest, 1–2 in Sarajevo
1984–85	Semi-final	eliminated by (Hungary) Videoton 2–1 in Sarajevo, 1–3 in Fehérvár
Mitropa Cup
1962–63	Semi-final	eliminated by (Hungary) MTK Budapest 1–1 in Sarajevo, 0–1 in Budapest
1968–69	Semi-final	eliminated by (Czech Republic) Sklo Union Teplice 1–1 in Sarajevo, 1–2 in Teplice

== List of matches ==
=== 1960s–1990 ===
Season	Competition	Round	Opponent	Home	Away	Agg.
1963	Mitropa Cup	QF	Austria Wien	4–1	0–2	4–3
1963	Mitropa Cup	SF	(Hungary) MTK	1–1	0–1	1–2
1964	Mitropa Cup	QF	(Czechoslovakia) Slovan Bratislava	2–1	1–3	3–4
1965–66	International Football Cup (UEFA Intertoto Cup)	Group B3	(Poland) Gwardia Warszawa	2–1	1–2	—N/a
1965–66	International Football Cup (UEFA Intertoto Cup)	Group B3	(Czechoslovakia) Baník Ostrava	3–1	1–1	—N/a
1965–66	International Football Cup (UEFA Intertoto Cup)	Group B3	(East Germany) Lokomotive Leipzig	2–2	0–0	—N/a
1967–68	Mitropa Cup	1R	(Czechoslovakia) Jednota Trenčín	1–0	0–0	1–0
1967–68	Mitropa Cup	QF	(Czechoslovakia) Spartak Trnava	2–2	1–2	3–4
1968–69	Mitropa Cup	1R	(Hungary) Budapesti Honvéd SE	1–0	1–0	2–0
1968–69	Mitropa Cup	QF	(Czechoslovakia) Baník Ostrava	4–0	1–1	5–1
1968–69	Mitropa Cup	SF	(Czechoslovakia) Sklo Union Teplice	1–1	1–2	2–3
1970–71	Inter-Cities Fairs Cup	1R	(Belgium) Anderlecht	3–4	4–5	7–9
1971–72	UEFA Cup	1R	(Belgium) Club Brugge	3–0	1–3	4–3
1971–72	UEFA Cup	2R	(Italy) Bologna	1–1	2–2	3–3 (a)
1971–72	UEFA Cup	3R	(Scotland) St. Johnstone	5–1	0–1	5–2
1971–72	UEFA Cup	QF	(Hungary) Ferencváros	1–2	2–1	3–3 (p)
1972–73	European Cup	1R	(England) Derby County	1–2	0–2	1–4
1984–85	UEFA Cup	1R	(Bulgaria) Sliven	5–1	0–1	5–2
1984–85	UEFA Cup	2R	(Switzerland) Sion	2–1	1–1	3–2
1984–85	UEFA Cup	3R	(Romania) Universitatea Craiova	4–0	0–2	4–2
1984–85	UEFA Cup	QF	(Soviet Union) Dinamo Minsk	2–0	1–1	3–1
1984–85	UEFA Cup	SF	(Hungary) Videoton	2–1	1–3	3–4

=== 1990–present ===
Season	Competition	Round	Opponent	Home	Away	Agg.
1998–99	UEFA Cup	1Q	(Scotland) Kilmarnock	1–1	0–1	1–2
2000–01	UEFA Cup	QR	(Poland) Wisła Kraków	0–0	1–3	1–3
2001–02	UEFA Champions League	1Q	(Bulgaria) Levski Sofia	0–0	0–4	0–4
2002–03	UEFA Champions League	1Q	(Iceland) Akranes	3–0	1–0	4–0
2002–03	UEFA Champions League	2Q	(Norway) Lillestrøm	1–0	1–0	2–0
2002–03	UEFA Champions League	3Q	(England) Newcastle United	0–1	0–4	0–5
2002–03	UEFA Cup	1R	(Spain) Málaga	0–0	0–1	0–1
2003–04	UEFA Cup	QR	(Cyprus) Anorthosis Famagusta	1–0	3–1	4–1
2003–04	UEFA Cup	1R	(Scotland) Heart of Midlothian	0–0	0–2	0–2
2004–05	UEFA Cup	1Q	(San Marino) Pennarossa	4–0	5–1	9–1
2004–05	UEFA Cup	2Q	(Bulgaria) Litex Lovech	1–2	0–7	1–9
2010–11	UEFA Champions League	2Q	(Israel) Hapoel Tel Aviv	0–1	0–5	0–6
2011–12	UEFA Europa League	2Q	(Moldova) Sheriff Tiraspol	1–0	0–0	1–0
2011–12	UEFA Europa League	3Q	(Israel) Maccabi Tel Aviv	0–2	0–6	0–8
2012–13	UEFA Champions League	2Q	(Slovenia) Maribor	1–2	1–4	2–6
2013–14	UEFA Champions League	2Q	(Czech Republic) Viktoria Plzeň	1–2	3–4	4–6
2014–15	UEFA Europa League	1Q	(Montenegro) Lovćen Cetinje	0–0	1–0	1–0
2014–15	UEFA Europa League	2Q	(North Macedonia) Metalurg Skopje	2–2	0–0	2–2 (a)
2015–16	UEFA Europa League	1Q	(Malta) Balzan	1–0	2–0	3–0
2015–16	UEFA Europa League	2Q	(Hungary) Ferencváros	2–0	1–0	3–0
2015–16	UEFA Europa League	3Q	(Belgium) Standard Liège	0–1	1–2	1–3
2017–18	UEFA Europa League	1Q	(Montenegro) Zeta	1–0	2–2	3–2
2017–18	UEFA Europa League	2Q	(Sweden) AIK	0–0	0–2	0–2
2018–19	UEFA Europa League	1Q	(Estonia) Narva Trans	3−1	2–0	5–1
2018–19	UEFA Europa League	2Q	(Cyprus) Apollon Limassol	1–2	1–3	2–5
2020–21	UEFA Europa League	1Q	(Israel) Maccabi Haifa	—N/a	1–3	—N/a
2023–24	UEFA Europa Conference League	1Q	(Belarus) Dinamo Minsk	2–2	2–1	4–3
2023–24	UEFA Europa Conference League	2Q	(Azerbaijan) Neftçi	2–2	0−2	2−4
2025–26	UEFA Conference League	1Q	(Slovenia) Koper	1–1	1−3	2−4

== Club ranking ==
=== UEFA coefficient ===
==== 2025–26 season ====
Rank	Team	Points
357	(Moldova) Sfîntul Gheorghe	2.925
358	(Luxembourg) UNA Strassen	2.500
359	(Bosnia and Herzegovina) Željezničar	2.500
360	(Wales) Haverfordwest County	2.500
361	(Finland) SJK	2.500

As of 17 August 2025. Source

== See also ==
- Željezničar Sarajevo
- Bosnian football clubs in European competitions
- Yugoslav First League - Best finish in Europe by club
