= Bosnia and Herzegovina football clubs in European competitions =

Clubs from Bosnia and Herzegovina have competed in European competitions since the 1967–68 season. Before 1992, Bosnia and Herzegovina was a part of Yugoslavia. Therefore, Bosnian teams represented this country and did not always have a guaranteed spot in European competitions. Željezničar's 1984–85 UEFA Cup semi-final elimination remains the most successful European campaign by any club from Bosnia and Herzegovina.

== History ==
=== Pre-independence ===
Sarajevo were the first club from Bosnia and Herzegovina to compete in a European competition. As Yugoslav champions, the side took part in the 1967–68 European Cup, defeating Cypriot side Olympiakos Nicosia in the first round, before losing to Manchester United in the second round.

Besides Sarajevo, four other teams from Bosnia and Herzegovina appeared in European competitions while the country was part of Yugoslavia, with Željezničar achieving the best result by reaching the semi-finals of the 1984–85 UEFA Cup, where they lost 4–3 on aggregate to Hungarian side Videoton.

=== Post-independence ===
Since independence, a further fourteen Bosnian clubs have competed in Europe.

The 2023–24 season marked a historic breakthrough, as Zrinjski became the first team from the country to reach the group stage of a UEFA club competition. They overcame Icelandic champions Breiðablik in the Europa League third qualifying round, but were defeated by Austrian side LASK in the play-offs, which redirected them to the Europa Conference League group stage. Zrinjski were drawn into Group E alongside Aston Villa of England, Polish side Legia Warsaw, and AZ from the Netherlands. On 21 September 2023, they secured their first-ever group stage victory in a dramatic comeback against AZ, overturning a 0–3 halftime deficit to win 4–3, with goals from Zvonimir Kožulj, Josip Ćorluka, and Aldin Hrvanović. Zrinjski also drew 1–1 at home against Aston Villa, ultimately finishing fourth in the group with 1 win, 1 draw, and 4 defeats, scoring 6 goals and conceding 10.

The following season, Borac qualified for the league phase under UEFA’s new competition format. After defeating Faroese champions KÍ in the Europa League third qualifying round, they were eliminated on penalties by Ferencváros in the play-offs, but still secured a place in the Conference League league phase. Drawn against Panathinaikos, APOEL, LASK, Omonia, Víkingur Reykjavík, and Shamrock Rovers, Borac began their campaign with a spirited 1–1 home draw against Panathinaikos, followed by a 1–0 away victory over APOEL. They went on to defeat LASK 2–1 and held Omonia to a goalless draw in Banja Luka, while suffering away losses to Víkingur and Shamrock Rovers. These results placed them 20th out of 36 teams, enough to progress to the knockout phase play-offs, where they edged Olimpija Ljubljana 1–0 on aggregate. In the round of 16, Borac faced Rapid Wien, drawing 1–1 at home before a narrow 2–1 extra-time defeat in Vienna ended their run.

In 2025–26 Europa League third qualifying round, Zrinjski once again defeated Breiðablik to secure another season in European club competition. In the play-off, they faced Dutch side Utrecht, losing 2–0 at home in Mostar before holding their opponents to a goalless draw in the return leg. The aggregate defeat denied Zrinjski a historic first appearance in the Europa League league phase, but they subsequently qualified for the League phase of the Conference League. They were drawn alongside Rapid Wien, Dynamo Kyiv, Mainz, Lincoln Red Imps, Raków Częstochowa, and Häcken. Zrinjski opened their league phase campaign with a 5–0 home victory over Lincoln Red Imps. This was followed by a 1–0 away defeat to Mainz and a 6–0 loss to Dynamo Kyiv in Lublin, the club’s worst result in European competition. They then secured a 2–1 win against Häcken in Mostar, and lost 1–0 away to Raków. In the final matchday, a 1–1 home draw against Rapid confirmed their first-ever qualification for the knockout phase play-offs.

== Qualification for European competitions ==
Four teams from Bosnia and Herzegovina qualify for European competitions.

Premier League champions qualify for the UEFA Champions League, while three other teams (one being the national Cup winner) qualify for the UEFA Conference League. Champions League teams start in the first qualifying round while teams in Conference League start in first or second qualifying round.

=== UEFA country coefficient ===
At the end of the 2025–26 season, Bosnia and Herzegovina was ranked 38th. The table below shows UEFA coefficients for Bosnia and Herzegovina, former Yugoslav associations, and other relevant UEFA members.

Rank	Member association	2021–22	2022–23	2023–24	2024–25	2025–26	Coeff.
20	Croatia^{Ex-Yu}	6.000	3.375	5.875	5.875	7.031	28.156
24	Serbia^{Ex-Yu}	9.500	5.375	1.400	3.725	5.750	25.750
26	Slovenia^{Ex-Yu}	3.000	2.125	3.875	9.093	6.375	24.468
36	Kosovo^{Ex-Yu}	2.333	2.875	3.000	2.000	3.781	13.989
37	Kazakhstan	2.875	1.125	3.125	3.000	3.625	13.750
38	Bosnia and Herzegovina	1.625	2.000	2.250	4.531	3.312	13.718
39	Latvia	2.625	2.750	1.625	3.875	2.000	12.875
45	North Macedonia^{Ex-Yu}	0.625	1.625	1.500	0.666	3.343	7.759
52	Montenegro^{Ex-Yu}	0.750	1.000	1.333	2.500	1.000	6.583

Updated: 28 July 2026

=== Ranking records ===
- Record-high ranking: 29 out of 53 after 2000–11 season
- Record-low ranking: 49 out of 50 after 1999–00 season

== Pre-war period ==
A total of five teams from Bosnia and Herzegovina participated in the three major European competitions at the time: the European Cup, the Fairs Cup/UEFA Cup, and the now-abolished UEFA Cup Winners' Cup.

=== European Cup ===
Sarajevo was the only team to win a tie and advance to the next round, achieving this in 1967–68 before losing in the second round to Manchester United. Their second participation in 1985–86 ended in a 4–2 aggregate loss to Finnish champions Kuusysi Lahti. Sarajevo's fierce city rival, Željezničar, lost to English side Derby County in the first round of their sole European Cup appearance.

Team	Participations	Round wins	Games	Wins	Draws	Losses	Goals for	Goals against
FK Sarajevo	2	1	6	1	2	3	8	9
FK Željezničar Sarajevo	1	0	2	0	0	2	1	4

TOTAL	3	1	8	1	2	5	9	13

=== UEFA Cup Winners' Cup ===
This competition, abolished in 1999, featured two teams from Bosnia and Herzegovina. Both Velež Mostar and Borac Banja Luka participated twice.

Team	Participations	Round wins	Games	Wins	Draws	Losses	Goals for	Goals against
FK Velež Mostar	2	2	8	3	4	1	18	13
FK Borac Banja Luka	2	1	6	4	0	2	17	8

TOTAL	4	3	14	7	4	3	35	21

=== Inter-Cities Fairs Cup ===
Željezničar was the only club from Bosnia and Herzegovina to participate in the Inter-Cities Fairs Cup. They competed in its final season before the tournament was officially sanctioned by UEFA and rebranded as the UEFA Cup. Željezničar were eliminated in the first round by Belgian powerhouse Anderlecht.

Team	Participations	Round wins	Games	Wins	Draws	Losses	Goals for	Goals against
FK Željezničar Sarajevo	1	0	2	0	0	2	7	9

TOTAL	1	0	2	0	0	2	2	7

=== UEFA Cup ===
The UEFA Cup was introduced in the 1971–72 season. Clubs from Bosnia and Herzegovina began playing significantly more matches in European competitions than before. The most notable campaign was Željezničar’s run to the semifinals in 1984–85, where they lost to Hungarian Videoton. Velež participated in four seasons, Sarajevo and Željezničar in two each, and Sloboda Tuzla in one season.

Team	Participations	Round wins	Games	Wins	Draws	Losses	Goals for	Goals against
FK Velež Mostar	4	6	20	9	5	6	30	28
FK Željezničar Sarajevo	2	7	18	8	4	6	33	23
FK Sarajevo	2	2	8	3	3	2	21	21
FK Sloboda Tuzla	1	0	2	1	0	1	4	8

TOTAL	9	15	48	21	13	14	88	80

=== Statistics ===
Team	Participations	Round wins	Games	Wins	Draws	Losses	Goals for	Goals against
FK Velež Mostar	6	8	28	12	9	7	48	41
FK Željezničar	5	7	22	8	4	10	41	36
FK Sarajevo	4	3	14	4	5	5	29	30
FK Borac Banja Luka	2	1	6	4	0	2	17	8
FK Sloboda Tuzla	1	0	2	1	0	1	4	8

TOTAL	18	19	72	29	18	25	139	123

=== Records ===
Biggest win
1975–76 Cup Winners' Cup
(Socialist Federal Republic of Yugoslavia) Borac – (Luxembourg) Rumelange 9–0

Biggest aggregate win
1975–76 Cup Winners' Cup
(Socialist Federal Republic of Yugoslavia) Borac – (Luxembourg) Rumelange 14–1 (9–0 H, 5–1 A)

Biggest loss
1982–83 UEFA Cup
(Belgium) Anderlecht – (Socialist Federal Republic of Yugoslavia) Sarajevo 6–1

Biggest aggregate loss
1982–83 UEFA Cup
(Socialist Federal Republic of Yugoslavia) Sarajevo – (Belgium) Anderlecht 2–6 (1-6 A, 1-0 H)

Furthest in a competition
1984–85 UEFA Cup
(Socialist Federal Republic of Yugoslavia) Željezničar reached the semifinals

== Post-war period ==
Following the breakup of Yugoslavia, Bosnia and Herzegovina, like other newly independent countries, established its own football league. Bosnian clubs first appeared in European competitions in 1998, when two Sarajevo teams competed in the UEFA Cup. In 1999, Jedinstvo Bihać participated in the (now defunct) UEFA Intertoto Cup. The country’s debut in the UEFA Champions League came in 2000, with Brotnjo Čitluk taking part after winning the Bosniak–Croatian playoff. No Bosnian clubs competed in Europe during the 1999–2000 season aside from Jedinstvo’s Intertoto campaign.

=== UEFA Champions League ===
Since the 2000–01 season, eight teams from Bosnia and Herzegovina have participated in the UEFA Champions League, but none have reached the group stage or league phase. Two clubs advanced to the third qualifying round, where they suffered hard defeats.

In the 2002–03 season, Željezničar defeated the Icelandic and Norwegian champions before facing English side Newcastle United in the third qualifying round. They lost 0–1 at home and 0–4 away. In the 2007–08 season, Sarajevo progressed past the Maltese champions and caused a surprise by defeating Genk, advancing to the third qualifying round against Ukrainian giants Dynamo Kyiv, where they lost both matches.

Among other Bosnian clubs, Zrinjski holds the record for the most Champions League appearances, having competed on nine occasions. Borac followed with three campaigns, while Široki Brijeg competed twice. Single appearances were made by Brotnjo, Modriča, and Leotar Trebinje, highlighting the sporadic yet persistent presence of Bosnian football on Europe’s biggest club stage.

Team	Participations	Round wins	Games	Wins	Draws	Losses	Goals for	Goals against
HŠK Zrinjski Mostar	9	2	22	5	7	10	17	32
FK Željezničar Sarajevo	5	2	14	4	1	9	12	27
FK Sarajevo	4	3	12	4	0	8	16	17
FK Borac Banja Luka	3	1	8	3	0	5	11	17
NK Široki Brijeg	2	1	6	3	1	2	4	5
FK Modriča	1	1	4	2	0	2	5	8
FK Leotar Trebinje	1	1	4	1	1	2	3	4
HNK Brotnjo	1	0	2	1	0	1	3	4

TOTAL	26	11	72	23	10	39	71	114

Updated: 15 August 2025

=== UEFA Cup / Europa League ===
As in the Champions League, no team from Bosnia and Herzegovina has yet reached the group stage or league phase. Sarajevo came closest in several seasons, reaching the play-off round before being eliminated by Cluj in 2009–10, Borussia Mönchengladbach in 2014–15, and Celtic in 2019–20. Zrinjski reached the play-off round twice: in 2023–24, where they were knocked out by LASK, and in 2025–26, losing to Utrecht. Borac reached the play-off in 2024–25, where they were defeated by Ferencváros.

Team	Participations	Round wins	Games	Wins	Draws	Losses	Goals for	Goals against
FK Sarajevo	15	14	60	21	13	26	85	110
NK Široki Brijeg	14	10	48	16	11	26	60	78
FK Željezničar Sarajevo	11	8	37	13	10	14	38	45
HŠK Zrinjski Mostar	10	12	41	19	10	13	67	57
FK Borac Banja Luka	4	2	10	2	5	3	10	11
FK Radnik Bijeljina	2	0	4	1	1	2	2	4
FK Modriča	1	1	4	2	0	2	4	8
FK Slavija Istočno Sarajevo	1	1	4	1	1	2	4	6
FK Olimpik	1	0	2	0	1	0	1	1
HNK Brotnjo	1	0	2	0	1	1	1	2
FK Sloboda Tuzla	1	0	2	0	1	1	0	1
NK Žepče	1	0	2	0	1	1	1	4
FK Budućnost Banovići	1	0	2	0	0	2	0	4
HNK Orašje	1	0	2	0	0	2	0	7

TOTAL	64	48	219	75	55	94	273	336

Updated: 2 September 2025

=== UEFA Conference League ===
Since the competition’s inception in 2021–22, two clubs from Bosnia and Herzegovina have appeared in the UEFA Conference League group stage or league phase. Zrinjski became the first and only Bosnian club to reach the group stage in the 2023–24 season. They later qualified for the league phase in the 2025–26 season and advanced to the knockout round play-offs. Borac meanwhile became the first club from the country to reach the round of 16 in the 2024–25 season, before losing to Rapid Wien.

Team	Participations	Round wins	Games	Wins	Draws	Losses	Goals for	Goals against
FK Borac Banja Luka	5	2	18	5	5	8	14	24
HŠK Zrinjski Mostar	4	5	26	9	4	13	29	32
FK Sarajevo	4	1	10	2	4	4	8	15
FK Velež Mostar	3	2	10	3	2	5	10	17
FK Željezničar Sarajevo	2	1	6	1	3	2	8	11
FK Tuzla City	1	1	4	2	0	2	8	5
NK Široki Brijeg	1	0	2	1	0	1	3	4

TOTAL	20	12	76	23	18	35	80	108

Updated: 26 February 2026

=== UEFA Intertoto Cup ===
Between 1995 and 2008, six Bosnian clubs participated in the now-defunct Intertoto Cup. Jedinstvo Bihać made their debut in 1999, becoming the first Bosnian club to win and progress to the next round of the competition. No Bosnian team advanced beyond the second round, meaning no team played more than four matches in a single season.

Team	Participations	Round wins	Games	Wins	Draws	Losses	Goals for	Goals against
FK Sloboda Tuzla	2	2	8	2	2	4	7	12
NK Čelik Zenica	2	1	6	4	0	2	11	9
HŠK Zrinjski Mostar	2	1	6	2	2	2	8	7
FK Slavija Istočno Sarajevo	1	1	4	2	1	1	6	7
NK Jedinstvo Bihać	1	1	4	1	0	3	5	6
HNK Brotnjo	1	0	2	1	0	1	2	8

TOTAL	9	6	30	12	5	13	39	49

Updated: 15 August 2025

=== Statistics ===
Team	Participations	Round wins	Games	Wins	Draws	Losses	Goals for	Goals against
HŠK Zrinjski Mostar	24	20	88	35	22	38	121	128
FK Sarajevo	23	18	82	27	17	38	109	142
FK Željezničar Sarajevo	18	11	57	18	14	25	58	83
NK Široki Brijeg	17	11	56	20	12	29	67	87
FK Borac Banja Luka	12	5	36	10	10	16	35	52
FK Velež Mostar	3	2	10	3	2	5	10	17
FK Sloboda Tuzla	3	2	10	2	3	5	7	13
HNK Brotnjo Čitluk	3	0	6	2	1	3	6	14
FK Modriča	2	2	8	4	0	4	9	16
FK Slavija Istočno Sarajevo	2	2	8	3	2	3	10	13
NK Čelik Zenica	2	1	6	4	0	2	11	9
FK Radnik Bijeljina	2	0	4	1	1	2	2	4
FK Tuzla City	1	1	4	2	0	2	8	5
FK Leotar Trebinje	1	1	4	1	1	2	3	4
NK Jedinstvo Bihać	1	1	4	1	0	3	5	6
FK Olimpik	1	0	2	0	1	0	1	1
NK Žepče	1	0	2	0	1	1	1	4
FK Budućnost Banovići	1	0	2	0	0	2	0	4
HNK Orašje	1	0	2	0	0	2	0	7

TOTAL	119	77	398	133	88	182	463	609

Updated: 26 February 2026

=== Records ===
Biggest win
2010–11 UEFA Europa League
(San Marino) Tre Penne - (Bosnia and Herzegovina) Zrinjski Mostar 2-9

Biggest aggregate win
2010–11 UEFA Europa League
(Bosnia and Herzegovina) Zrinjski Mostar - (San Marino) Tre Penne 13-3 (9-2 A, 4-1 H)

Biggest loss
2018–19 UEFA Europa League
(Bosnia and Herzegovina) Sarajevo - (Italy) Atalanta 0-8

Biggest aggregate loss
2007–08 UEFA Cup
(Bosnia and Herzegovina) Zrinjski Mostar - (Serbia) Partizan 1-11 (1-6 H, 0-5 A) (match declared void due to Serbian fans' riots; Zrinjski progressed to the next round)

Furthest in a competition
2024–25 UEFA Conference League
(Bosnia and Herzegovina) Borac reached the Round of 16

== Results by competition ==
=== European Cup / UEFA Champions League ===
==== SFR Yugoslavia era (1955–1992) ====
Season	Club	Round	Opponent	Home	Away	Agg.
1967–68	Sarajevo	R1	(Cyprus) Olympiakos Nicosia	3–1	2–2	5–3
1967–68	Sarajevo	R2	(England) Manchester United	0–0	1–2	1–2
1972–73	Željezničar	R1	(England) Derby County	1–2	0–2	1–4
1985–86	Sarajevo	R1	(Finland) Kuusysi	1–2	1–2	2–4

==== Bosnia and Herzegovina era (1992–present) ====
Season	Club	Round	Opponent	Home	Away	Agg.
2000–01	Brotnjo	QR1	(Lithuania) FBK Kaunas	3–0	0–4	3–4
2001–02	Željezničar	QR1	(Bulgaria) Levski Sofia	0–0	0–4	0–4
2002–03	Željezničar	QR1	(Iceland) ÍA Akranes	3–0	1–0	4–0
2002–03	Željezničar	QR2	(Norway) Lillestrøm	1–0	1–0	2–0
2002–03	Željezničar	QR3	(England) Newcastle United	0–1	0–4	0–5
2003–04	Leotar	QR1	(Luxembourg) Grevenmacher	2–0	0–0	2–0
2003–04	Leotar	QR2	(Czech Republic) Slavia Prague	1–2	0–2	1–4
2004–05	Široki Brijeg	QR1	(Azerbaijan) Neftchi Baku	2–1	0–1	2–2 (a)
2005–06	Zrinjski Mostar	QR1	(Luxembourg) F91 Dudelange	0–4 (aet)	1–0	1–4
2006–07	Široki Brijeg	QR1	(Belarus) Shakhtyor Soligorsk	1–0	1–0	2–0
2006–07	Široki Brijeg	QR2	(Scotland) Heart of Midlothian	0–0	0–3	0–3
2007–08	Sarajevo	QR1	(Malta) Marsaxlokk	3–1	6–0	9–1
2007–08	Sarajevo	QR2	(Belgium) Genk	0–1	2–1	2–2 (a)
2007–08	Sarajevo	QR3	(Ukraine) Dynamo Kyiv	0–1	0–3	0–4
2008–09	Modriča	QR1	(Albania) Dinamo Tirana	2–1	2–0	4–1
2008–09	Modriča	QR2	(Denmark) AaB	1–2	0–5	1–7
2009–10	Zrinjski Mostar	QR2	(Slovakia) Slovan Bratislava	1–0	0–4	1–4
2010–11	Željezničar	QR2	(Israel) Hapoel Tel Aviv	0–1	0–5	0–6
2011–12	Borac Banja Luka	QR2	(Israel) Maccabi Haifa	3–2	1–5	4–7
2012–13	Željezničar	QR2	(Slovenia) Maribor	1–2	1–4	2–6
2013–14	Željezničar	QR2	(Czech Republic) Viktoria Plzeň	1–2	3–4	4–6
2014–15	Zrinjski Mostar	QR2	(Slovenia) Maribor	0–0	0–2	0–2
2015–16	Sarajevo	QR2	(Poland) Lech Poznań	0–2	0–1	0–3
2016–17	Zrinjski Mostar	QR2	(Poland) Legia Warsaw	1–1	0–2	1–3
2017–18	Zrinjski Mostar	QR2	(Slovenia) Maribor	1–2	1–1	2–3
2018–19	Zrinjski Mostar	QR1	(Slovakia) Spartak Trnava	1–1	0–1	1–2
2019–20	Sarajevo	QR1	(Scotland) Celtic	1–3	1–2	2–5
2020–21	Sarajevo	QR1	(Wales) Connah's Quay Nomads	—N/a	2–0	—N/a
2020–21	Sarajevo	QR2	(Belarus) Dynamo Brest	—N/a	1–2	—N/a
2021–22	Borac Banja Luka	QR1	(Romania) Cluj	2–1 (aet)	1–3	3–4
2022–23	Zrinjski Mostar	QR1	(Moldova) Sheriff Tiraspol	0–0	0–1	0–1
2023–24	Zrinjski Mostar	QR1	(Armenia) Urartu	2–3 (aet)	1–0	3–3 (4–3 p)
2023–24	Zrinjski Mostar	QR2	(Slovakia) Slovan Bratislava	0–1	2–2	2–3
2024–25	Borac Banja Luka	QR1	(Albania) Egnatia	1–0	1–2 (aet)	2–2 (4–1 p)
2024–25	Borac Banja Luka	QR2	(Greece) PAOK	2–3	0–1	2–4
2025–26	Zrinjski Mostar	QR1	(San Marino) Virtus	2–1	2–0	4–1
2025–26	Zrinjski Mostar	QR2	(Slovakia) Slovan Bratislava	2–2	0–4	2–6
2026–27	Borac Banja Luka	QR1	(Bulgaria) Levski Sofia	1–1	0–4	1–5

=== UEFA Cup / Europa League ===
==== SFR Yugoslavia era (1971–1992) ====
Season	Club	Round	Opponent	Home	Away	Agg.
1971–72	Željezničar	R1	(Belgium) Club Brugge	3–0	1–3	4–3
1971–72	Željezničar	R2	(Italy) Bologna	1–1	2–2	3–3 (a)
1971–72	Željezničar	R3	(Scotland) St. Johnstone	5–1	0–1	5–2
1971–72	Željezničar	QF	(Hungary) Ferencváros	1–2	2–1	3–3 (4–5 p)
1973–74	Velež Mostar	R1	(Czechoslovakia) Tatran Prešov	1–1	2–4	3–5
1974–75	Velež Mostar	R1	(Soviet Union) Spartak Moscow	2–0	1–3	3–3 (a)
1974–75	Velež Mostar	R2	(Austria) Rapid Vienna	1–0	1–1	3–1
1974–75	Velež Mostar	R3	(England) Derby County	4–1	1–3	5–4
1974–75	Velež Mostar	QF	(Netherlands) Twente	1–0	0–2	1–2
1977–78	Sloboda Tuzla	R1	(Spain) Las Palmas	4–3	0–5	4–8
1980–81	Sarajevo	R1	(West Germany) Hamburger SV	3–3	2–4	5–7
1982–83	Sarajevo	R1	(Bulgaria) Slavia Sofia	4–2	2–2	6–4
1982–83	Sarajevo	R2	(Romania) Corvinul Hunedoara	4–0	4-4	8-4
1982–83	Sarajevo	R3	(Belgium) Anderlecht	1–0	1–6	2–6
1984–85	Željezničar	R1	(Bulgaria) Sliven	5–1	0–1	5–2
1984–85	Željezničar	R2	(Switzerland) Sion	2–1	1-1	3-2
1984–85	Željezničar	R3	(Romania) Universitatea Craiova	4–0	0–2	4–2
1984–85	Željezničar	QF	(Soviet Union) Dinamo Minsk	2–0	1–1	3–1
1984–85	Željezničar	SF	(Hungary) Videoton	2–1	1–3	3–4
1987–88	Velež Mostar	R1	(Switzerland) Sion	5–0	0–3	5–3
1987–88	Velež Mostar	R2	(West Germany) Borussia Dortmund	2–1	0–2	2–3
1988–89	Velež Mostar	R1	(Cyprus) APOEL	1–0	5–2	6–2
1988–89	Velež Mostar	R2	(Portugal) Belenenses	0–0	0–0	0–0 (4–3 p)
1988–89	Velež Mostar	R3	(Scotland) Heart of Midlothian	2–1	0–3	2–4

==== Bosnia and Herzegovina era (1992–present) ====
Season	Club	Round	Opponent	Home	Away	Agg.
1998–99	Sarajevo	QR1	(Belgium) Germinal Ekeren	0–0	1–4	1–4
1998–99	Željezničar	QR1	(Scotland) Kilmarnock	1–1	0–1	1–2
2000–01	Budućnost Banovići	QR	(Czech Republic) Drnovice	0–1	0–3	0–4
2000–01	Željezničar	QR	(Poland) Wisła Kraków	0–0	1–3	1–3
2001–02	Brotnjo	QR	(Norway) Viking	1–1	0–1	1–2
2001–02	Sarajevo	QR	(Portugal) Marítimo	0–1	0–1	0–2
2002–03	Sarajevo	QR	(Czech Republic) Sigma Olomouc	2–1	1–2	3–3 (5–3 p)
2002–03	Sarajevo	R1	(Turkey) Beşiktaş	0–5	2–2	2–7
2002–03	Široki Brijeg	QR	(Slovakia) Senec	3–0	2–1	5–1
2002–03	Široki Brijeg	R1	(Czech Republic) Sparta Prague	0–1	0–3	0–4
2002–03	Željezničar	R1	(Spain) Málaga	0–0	0–1	0–1
2003–04	Sarajevo	QR	(Federal Republic of Yugoslavia) Sartid	1–1	0–3	1–4
2003–04	Željezničar	QR	(Cyprus) Anorthosis Famagusta	1–0	3–1	4–1
2003–04	Željezničar	R1	(Scotland) Heart of Midlothian	0–0	0–2	0–2
2004–05	Modriča	QR1	(Andorra) FC Santa Coloma	3–0	1–0	4–0
2004–05	Modriča	QR2	(Bulgaria) Levski Sofia	0–3	0–5	0–8
2004–05	Željezničar	QR1	(San Marino) Pennarossa	4–0	5–1	9–1
2004–05	Željezničar	QR2	(Bulgaria) Litex Lovech	1–2	0–7	1–9
2005–06	Široki Brijeg	QR1	(Albania) Teuta Durrës	3–0	1–3	4–3
2005–06	Široki Brijeg	QR2	(Serbia and Montenegro) Zeta	4–2	1–0	5–2
2005–06	Široki Brijeg	R1	(Switzerland) Basel	0–1	0–5	0–6
2005–06	Žepče	QR1	(North Macedonia) Bashkimi	1–1	0–3^{1}	1–4
2006–07	Orašje	QR1	(Slovenia) Domžale	0–2	0–5	0–7
2006–07	Sarajevo	QR1	(Andorra) Rànger's	3–0	2–0	5–0
2006–07	Sarajevo	QR2	(Romania) Rapid București	1–0	0–2	1–2
2007–08	Sarajevo	R1	(Switzerland) Basel	1–2	0–6	1–8
2007–08	Široki Brijeg	QR1	(Slovenia) Koper	3–1	3–2	6–3
2007–08	Široki Brijeg	QR2	(Israel) Hapoel Tel Aviv	0–3	0–3	0–6
2007–08	Zrinjski Mostar	QR1	(Serbia) Partizan	1–6	0–5	1–11^{2}
2007–08	Zrinjski Mostar	QR2	(North Macedonia) Rabotnički	1–2	0–0	1–2
2008–09	Široki Brijeg	QR1	(Albania) Partizani Tirana	0–0	3–1	3–1
2008–09	Široki Brijeg	QR2	(Turkey) Beşiktaş	1–2	0–4	1–6
2008–09	Zrinjski Mostar	QR1	(Liechtenstein) Vaduz	3–1	2–1	5–2
2008–09	Zrinjski Mostar	QR2	(Portugal) Braga	0–2	0–1	0–3
2009–10	Sarajevo	QR2	(Slovakia) Spartak Trnava	1–0	1–1	2–1
2009–10	Sarajevo	QR3	(Sweden) Helsingborg	2–1	1–2	3–3 (5–4 p)
2009–10	Sarajevo	PO	(Romania) Cluj	1–1	1–2	2–3
2009–10	Slavija Sarajevo	QR2	(Denmark) AaB	3–1	0–0	3–1
2009–10	Slavija Sarajevo	QR3	(Slovakia) Košice	0–2	1–3	1–5
2009–10	Široki Brijeg	QR1	(Armenia) Banants	0–1	2–0	2–1
2009–10	Široki Brijeg	QR2	(Austria) Sturm Graz	1–1	1–2	2–3
2010–11	Borac Banja Luka	QR2	(Switzerland) Lausanne-Sport	1–1	0–1	1–2
2010–11	Široki Brijeg	QR1	(Slovenia) Olimpija Ljubljana	3–0	2–0	5–0
2010–11	Široki Brijeg	QR2	Austria Wien	0–1	2–2	2–3
2010–11	Zrinjski Mostar	QR1	(Kazakhstan) Tobol	2–1	2–1	4–2
2010–11	Zrinjski Mostar	QR2	(San Marino) Tre Penne	4–1	9–2	13–3
2010–11	Zrinjski Mostar	QR3	(Denmark) Odense	0–0	3–5	3–5
2011–12	Sarajevo	QR2	(Sweden) Örebro	2–0	0–0	2–0
2011–12	Sarajevo	QR3	(Czech Republic) Sparta Prague	0–2	0–5	0–7
2011–12	Široki Brijeg	QR1	(Slovenia) Olimpija Ljubljana	0–0	0–3	0–3
2011–12	Željezničar	QR2	(Moldova) Sheriff Tiraspol	1–0	0–0	1–0
2011–12	Željezničar	QR3	(Israel) Maccabi Tel Aviv	0–2	0–6	0–8
2012–13	Borac Banja Luka	QR1	(Montenegro) Čelik Nikšić	2–2	1–1	3–3 (a)
2012–13	Sarajevo	QR1	(Malta) Hibernians	5–2	4–4	9–6
2012–13	Sarajevo	QR2	(Bulgaria) Levski Sofia	3–1	0–1	3–2
2012–13	Sarajevo	QR3	(Montenegro) Zeta	2–1	0–1	2–2 (a)
2012–13	Široki Brijeg	QR2	(Republic of Ireland) St Patrick's Athletic	1–1	1–2 (aet)	2–3
2013–14	Sarajevo	QR1	(San Marino) Libertas	1–0	2–1	3–1
2013–14	Sarajevo	QR2	(Albania) Kukësi	0–0	2–3	2–3
2013–14	Široki Brijeg	QR2	(Kazakhstan) Irtysh Pavlodar	2–0	2–3	4–3
2013–14	Široki Brijeg	QR3	(Italy) Udinese	1–3	0–4	1–7
2013–14	Zrinjski Mostar	QR1	(Andorra) UE Santa Coloma	1–0	3–1	4–1
2013–14	Zrinjski Mostar	QR2	(Bulgaria) Botev Plovdiv	1–1	0–2	1–3
2014–15	Sarajevo	QR2	(Norway) Haugesund	0–1	3–1	3–2
2014–15	Sarajevo	QR3	(Greece) Atromitos	1–2	3–1 (aet)	4–3
2014–15	Sarajevo	PO	(Germany) Borussia Mönchengladbach	2–3	0–7	2–10
2014–15	Široki Brijeg	QR1	(Azerbaijan) Gabala	3–0	2–0	5–0
2014–15	Široki Brijeg	QR2	(Czech Republic) Mladá Boleslav	0–4	1–2	1–6
2014–15	Željezničar	QR1	(Montenegro) Lovćen Cetinje	0–0	1–0	1–0
2014–15	Željezničar	QR2	(North Macedonia) Metalurg Skopje	2–2	0–0	2–2 (a)
2015–16	Olimpic	QR1	(Slovakia) Spartak Trnava	1–1	0–0	1–1 (a)
2015–16	Zrinjski Mostar	QR1	(Armenia) Shirak	2–1	0–2	2–3
2015–16	Željezničar	QR1	(Malta) Balzan	1–0	2–0	3–0
2015–16	Željezničar	QR2	(Hungary) Ferencváros	2–0	1–0	3–0
2015–16	Željezničar	QR3	(Belgium) Standard Liège	0–1	1–2	1–3
2016–17	Radnik Bijeljina	QR1	(Bulgaria) Beroe Stara Zagora	0–2	0–0	0–2
2016–17	Sloboda Tuzla	QR1	(Israel) Beitar Jerusalem	0–0	0–1	0–1
2016–17	Široki Brijeg	QR1	(Malta) Birkirkara	1–1	0–2	1–3
2017–18	Sarajevo	QR1	(Moldova) Zaria Bălți	2–1	1–2	3–3 (5–6 p)
2017–18	Široki Brijeg	QR1	(Kazakhstan) Ordabasy	2–0	0–0	2–0
2017–18	Široki Brijeg	QR2	(Scotland) Aberdeen	0–2	1–1	1–3
2017–18	Željezničar	QR1	(Montenegro) Zeta	1–0	2–2	3–2
2017–18	Željezničar	QR2	(Sweden) AIK	0–0	0–2	0–2
2018–19	Sarajevo	QR1	(Armenia) Banants	3–0	2–1	5–1
2018–19	Sarajevo	QR2	(Italy) Atalanta	0−8	2−2	2−10
2018–19	Široki Brijeg	QR1	(Slovenia) Domžale	1–1	2–2	3–3 (a)
2018–19	Zrinjski Mostar	QR2	(Malta) Valletta	1−1	2−1	3−2
2018–19	Zrinjski Mostar	QR3	(Bulgaria) Ludogorets Razgrad	1–1	0–1	1–2
2018–19	Željezničar	QR1	(Estonia) Narva Trans	4–2	2–0	6–2
2018–19	Željezničar	QR2	(Cyprus) Apollon Limassol	1−2	1−3	2−5
2019–20	Radnik Bijeljina	QR1	(Slovakia) Spartak Trnava	2–0	0–2	2–2 (2–3 p)
2019–20	Sarajevo	QR3	(Belarus) BATE Borisov	1–2	0–0	1–2
2019–20	Široki Brijeg	QR1	(Kazakhstan) Kairat	1–2	1–2	2–4
2019–20	Zrinjski Mostar	QR1	(North Macedonia) Akademija Pandev	3−0	3−0	6−0
2019–20	Zrinjski Mostar	QR2	(Netherlands) Utrecht	2−1 (aet)	1−1	3−2
2019–20	Zrinjski Mostar	QR3	(Sweden) Malmö	1–0	0–3	1–3
2020–21	Borac Banja Luka	QR1	(Montenegro) Sutjeska Nikšić	1–0	—N/a	—N/a
2020–21	Borac Banja Luka	QR2	(Portugal) Rio Ave	0–2	—N/a	—N/a
2020–21	Sarajevo	QR3	(Montenegro) Budućnost Podgorica	2–1	—N/a	—N/a
2020–21	Sarajevo	PO	(Scotland) Celtic	0–1	—N/a	—N/a
2020–21	Zrinjski Mostar	QR1	(Luxembourg) Differdange 03	3–0	—N/a	—N/a
2020–21	Zrinjski Mostar	QR2	(Slovenia) Olimpija Ljubljana	—N/a	3–2	—N/a
2020–21	Zrinjski Mostar	QR3	(Cyprus) APOEL	—N/a	2–2 (aet) (2–4 p)	—N/a
2020–21	Željezničar	QR1	(Israel) Maccabi Haifa	—N/a	1–3	—N/a
2023–24	Zrinjski Mostar	QR3	(Iceland) Breiðablik	6–2	0–1	6–3
2023–24	Zrinjski Mostar	PO	(Austria) LASK	1–1	1–2	2–3
2024–25	Borac Banja Luka	QR3	(Faroe Islands) KÍ	3–1 (aet)	1–2	4–3
2024–25	Borac Banja Luka	PO	(Hungary) Ferencváros	1–1 (aet)	0–0	1–1 (2–3 p)
2025–26	Zrinjski Mostar	QR3	(Iceland) Breiðablik	1–1	2–1	3–2
2025–26	Zrinjski Mostar	PO	(Netherlands) Utrecht	0–2	0–0	0–2

^{1} Bashkimi were awarded a 3–0 win because was Žepče fielded an ineligible player.
^{2} UEFA expelled Partizan from the 2007–08 UEFA Cup due to crowd trouble at their away tie in Mostar, which forced the match to be interrupted for 10 minutes. UEFA adjudged travelling Partizan fans to have been the culprits of the trouble, but Partizan were allowed to play the return leg while the appeal was being processed. However, Partizan's appeal was rejected so Zrinjski Mostar qualified.

=== UEFA Conference League ===
Season	Club	Round	Opponent	Home	Away	Agg.
2021–22	Borac Banja Luka	QR2	(Northern Ireland) Linfield	0–0	0–4	0–4
2021–22	Sarajevo	QR1	(Moldova) Milsami Orhei	0–1	0–0	0–1
2021–22	Široki Brijeg	QR1	(Albania) Vllaznia	3–1	0–3	3–4
2021–22	Velež Mostar	QR1	(Northern Ireland) Coleraine	2–1	2–1	4–2
2021–22	Velež Mostar	QR2	(Greece) AEK Athens	2–1	0–1 (aet)	2–2 (3–2 p)
2021–22	Velež Mostar	QR3	(Sweden) Elfsborg	1–4	1–1	2–5
2022–23	Borac Banja Luka	QR1	(Faroe Islands) B36 Tórshavn	2–0	1–3 (aet)	3–3 (3–4 p)
2022–23	Tuzla City	QR1	(San Marino) Tre Penne	6–0	2–0	8–0
2022–23	Tuzla City	QR2	(Netherlands) AZ Alkmaar	0–4	0–1	0–5
2022–23	Velež Mostar	QR2	(Malta) Ħamrun Spartans	0–1	0–1	0–1
2022–23	Zrinjski Mostar	QR2	(Albania) Tirana	3–2	1–0	4–2
2022–23	Zrinjski Mostar	QR3	(Kazakhstan) Tobol	1–0	1–1	2–1
2022–23	Zrinjski Mostar	PO	(Slovakia) Slovan Bratislava	1–0	1–2 (aet)	2–2 (5–6 p)
2023–24	Borac Banja Luka	QR2	Austria Wien	1-2	0–1	1-3
2023–24	Sarajevo	QR1	(Georgia (country)) Torpedo Kutaisi	1–1 (aet)	2–2	3–3 (2–4 p)
2023–24	Zrinjski Mostar	GS	(England) Aston Villa	1–1	0–1	4th
2023–24	Zrinjski Mostar	GS	(Poland) Legia Warsaw	1–2	0–2	4th
2023–24	Zrinjski Mostar	GS	(Netherlands) AZ	4–3	0–1	4th
2023–24	Željezničar	QR1	(Belarus) Dinamo Minsk	2–2	2–1	3–2
2023–24	Željezničar	QR2	(Azerbaijan) Neftchi Baku	2–2	0–2	2–4
2024–25	Borac Banja Luka	LP	(Greece) Panathinaikos	1–1	—N/a	20th
2024–25	Borac Banja Luka	LP	(Cyprus) APOEL	—N/a	1–0	20th
2024–25	Borac Banja Luka	LP	(Iceland) Víkingur	—N/a	0–2	20th
2024–25	Borac Banja Luka	LP	(Austria) LASK	2–1	—N/a	20th
2024–25	Borac Banja Luka	LP	(Republic of Ireland) Shamrock Rovers	—N/a	0–3	20th
2024–25	Borac Banja Luka	LP	(Cyprus) Omonia	0–0	—N/a	20th
2024–25	Borac Banja Luka	KPO	(Slovenia) Olimpija Ljubljana	1–0	0–0	1–0
2024–25	Borac Banja Luka	R16	(Austria) Rapid Wien	1–1	1–2 (aet)	2–3
2024–25	Sarajevo	QR1	(Kazakhstan) Aktobe	2–3 (aet)	1–0	3–3 (4–3 p)
2024–25	Sarajevo	QR2	(Slovakia) Spartak Trnava	0–0	0–3	0–3
2024–25	Velež Mostar	QR1	(Andorra) Inter Club d'Escaldes	1–1	1–5	2–6
2024–25	Zrinjski Mostar	QR2	(Slovenia) Bravo	0–1	3–1	3–2
2024–25	Zrinjski Mostar	QR3	(Bulgaria) Botev Plovdiv	2–0	1–2	3–2
2024–25	Zrinjski Mostar	PO	(Portugal) Vitória de Guimarães	0–4	0–3	0–7
2025–26	Borac	QR1	(Andorra) FC Santa Coloma	1–4	2–0	3–4
2025–26	Sarajevo	QR2	(Romania) Universitatea Craiova	2–1	0–4	2–5
2025–26	Zrinjski Mostar	LP	(Gibraltar) Lincoln Red Imps	5–0	—N/a	23rd
2025–26	Zrinjski Mostar	LP	(Germany) Mainz	—N/a	0–1	23rd
2025–26	Zrinjski Mostar	LP	(Ukraine) Dynamo Kyiv	—N/a	0–6	23rd
2025–26	Zrinjski Mostar	LP	(Sweden) Häcken	2–1	—N/a	23rd
2025–26	Zrinjski Mostar	LP	(Poland) Raków Częstochowa	—N/a	0–1	23rd
2025–26	Zrinjski Mostar	LP	(Austria) Rapid Wien	1–1	—N/a	23rd
2025–26	Zrinjski Mostar	KPO	(England) Crystal Palace	1–1	0–2	1–3
2025–26	Željezničar	QR1	(Slovenia) Koper	1–1	1–3	2–4
2026–27	Borac	QR2	(Moldova) Petrocub Hîncești	3–0	3–3	6–3
2026–27	Borac	QR3	(Belarus) Maxline Vitebsk	6 Aug	13 Aug	
2026–27	Sarajevo	QR1	(Finland) Inter Turku	1–1	1–2	2–3
2026–27	Velež Mostar	QR1	(Moldova) Milsami Orhei	1–1	1–0	2–1
2026–27	Velež Mostar	QR2	(Slovakia) DAC Dunajská Streda	0–3	0–1	0–4
2026–27	Zrinjski Mostar	QR2	(Iceland) Valur	0–1	2–2	2–3

=== UEFA Cup Winners' Cup ===
==== SFR Yugoslavia era (1960–1992) ====
Season	Club	Round	Opponent	Home	Away	Agg.
1975–76	Borac Banja Luka	R1	(Luxembourg) Rumelange	9–0	5–1	14–1
1975–76	Borac Banja Luka	R2	(Belgium) Anderlecht	1–0	0–3	1–3
1981–82	Velež Mostar	R1	(Luxembourg) Jeunesse Esch	6–1	1–1	7–2
1981–82	Velež Mostar	R2	(East Germany) Lokomotive Leipzig	1–1	1–1	2–2 (1–4 p)
1986–87	Velež Mostar	R1	(Hungary) Vasas	3–2	2–2	5–4
1986–87	Velež Mostar	R2	(Bulgaria) Vitosha Sofia	4–3	0–2	4–5
1988–89	Borac Banja Luka	R1	(Soviet Union) Metalist Kharkiv	2–0	0–4	2–4

=== Inter-Cities Fairs Cup ===
==== SFR Yugoslavia era (1955–1971) ====
Season	Club	Round	Opponent	Home	Away	Agg.
1970–71	Željezničar	R1	(Belgium) Anderlecht	3–4	4–5	7–9

=== UEFA Intertoto Cup ===
==== Bosnia and Herzegovina era (1995–2008) ====
Season	Club	Round	Opponent	Home	Away	Agg.
1999	Jedinstvo Bihać	R1	(Faroe Islands) GÍ Gøta	3–0	0–1	3–1
1999	Jedinstvo Bihać	R2	(Romania) Ceahlăul Piatra Neamț	1–2	1–3	2–5
2000	Zrinjski Mostar	R1	(Sweden) Västra Frölunda	2–1	0–1	2–2 (a)
2001	Čelik Zenica	R1	(Turkey) Denizlispor	1–0	5–3	6–3
2001	Čelik Zenica	R2	(Belgium) Gent	1–0	0–2	1–2
2002	Brotnjo	R1	(Switzerland) Zürich	2–1	0–7	2–8
2003	Sloboda Tuzla	R1	(Iceland) KA Akureyri	1–1	1–1	1–1 (3–2 p)
2003	Sloboda Tuzla	R2	(Belgium) Lierse	1–0	1–5	2–5
2004	Sloboda Tuzla	R1	(Slovenia) Celje	1–0	1–2	2–2
2004	Sloboda Tuzla	R2	(Slovakia) Spartak Trnava	0–1	1–2	1–3
2006	Zrinjski Mostar	R1	(Malta) Marsaxlokk	3–0	1–1	4–1
2006	Zrinjski Mostar	R2	(Israel) Maccabi Petah Tikva	1–3	1–1	2–4
2007	Slavija Sarajevo	R1	(Andorra) Sant Julià	3–2	3–2	6–4
2007	Slavija Sarajevo	R2	(Romania) Oțelul Galați	0–0	0–3	0–3
2008	Čelik Zenica	R1	(Montenegro) Grbalj	3–2	1–2	4–4 (a)

== See also ==
- FK Sarajevo in European football
- FK Željezničar Sarajevo in European football
