= Ildar Garifullin =

Soviet Nordic combined skier (1963–2023)

Medal record

Men's Nordic combined

World Championships
Bronze medal – third place	1984 Rovaniemi	3 × 10 km team

Ildar Garifullin (Russian: Ильдар Гарифуппин; 27 May 1963 – 22 May 2023) was a Russian Nordic combined skier who competed for the Soviet Union in the early 1980s. He won a bronze medal in the 3 × 10 km team event at the 1984 FIS Nordic World Ski Championships in Rovaniemi. Garifullin's best individual finish was 5th in West Germany in 1984.

Garifullin also competed in the Nordic combined event at the 1984 Winter Olympics.

Garifullin died on 22 May 2023, at the age of 59.
