= Takahiro Tanaka (skier) =

Japanese Nordic combined skier

Personal information
- Nationality: Japanese
- Born: 28 February 1962 (age 63); Nagano, Japan

Sport
- Sport: Nordic combined

Takahiro Tanaka (田中 隆博, Tanaka Takahiro; born 28 February 1962) is a Japanese skier. He competed in the Nordic combined event at the 1984 Winter Olympics.
