= Toshiaki Maruyama =

Japanese Nordic combined skier

Personal information
- Nationality: Japanese
- Born: 6 September 1959 (age 67) Sanada, Japan

Sport
- Sport: Nordic combined

Toshiaki Maruyama (丸山 寿明, Maruyama Toshiaki; born 6 September 1959) is a Japanese skier. He competed in the Nordic combined event at the 1984 Winter Olympics.
