= FK Sarajevo in European football =

- Club: FK Sarajevo
- First entry: 1960 Mitropa Cup
- Latest entry: 2026–27 UEFA Conference League

Fudbalski klub Sarajevo (Cyrillic: Фудбалски клуб Сарајево, IPA: [fûdbalskiː klûːb sɑɹəˈjeɪvəʊ]; English: Sarajevo Football Club) is a professional football club based in Sarajevo, the capital city of Bosnia and Herzegovina and is one of the most successful clubs in the country.

The first ever involvement of the team in European competitions was in the 1960 Mitropa Cup.

== Summary ==
=== Statistics ===
As of 16 July 2026

Competition	Pld	W	D	L	GF	GA	GD
European Cup / Champions League	18	5	2	11	24	26	−2
UEFA Cup / Europa League	60	21	13	26	85	112	−27
UEFA Conference League	12	2	5	5	10	18	−8
Total	90	28	20	42	119	156	−37

=== Results ===
- QR = Qualifying Round
- PO = Play-off Round
- R1 = First Round / R2 = Second Round / R3 = Third Round / R16 = Round of 16
- QF = Quarter Finals
- SF = Semi-finals

== European Cup / UEFA Champions League ==
Season	Round	Country	Opposing team	Home	Away	Aggregate
1967–68	R1	(Cyprus)	Olympiakos Nicosia	3–1	2–2	5–3
1967–68	R2	(England)	Manchester United	0–0	1–2	1–2
1985–86	R1	(Finland)	Kuusysi	1–2	1–2	2–4
2007–08	QR1	(Malta)	Marsaxlokk	3–1	6–0	9–1
2007–08	QR2	(Belgium)	Genk	0–1	2–1	2–2 (a)
2007–08	QR3	(Ukraine)	Dynamo Kyiv	0–1	0–3	0–4
2015–16	QR2	(Poland)	Lech Poznań	0–2	0–1	0–3
2019–20	QR1	(Scotland)	Celtic	1–3	1–2	2–5
2020–21	QR1	(Wales)	Connah's Quay Nomads	—N/a	2–0	—N/a
2020–21	QR2	(Belarus)	Dynamo Brest	—N/a	1–2	—N/a

== UEFA Cup / UEFA Europa League ==
Season	Round	Country	Opposing team	Home	Away	Aggregate
1980–81	R1	(Germany)	Hamburg	3–3	2–4	5–7
1982–83	R1	(Bulgaria)	Slavia Sofia	4–2	2–2	6–4
1982–83	R2	(Romania)	Corvinul Hunedoara	4–0	4–4	8–4
1982–83	R3	(Belgium)	Anderlecht	1–0	1–6	2–6
1998–99	QR	(Belgium)	Germinal Ekeren	0–0	1–4	1–4
2001–02	QR	(Portugal)	Marítimo	0–1	0–1	0–2
2002–03	Q	(Czech Republic)	Sigma Olomouc	2–1	1–2	3–3 (5–3 p)
2002–03	R1	(Turkey)	Beşiktaş	0–5	2–2	2–7
2003–04	Q	(Federal Republic of Yugoslavia)	Sartid	1–1	0–3	1–4
2006–07	QR1	(Andorra)	Rànger's	3–0	2–0	5–0
2006–07	QR2	(Romania)	Rapid București	1–0	0–2	1–2
2007–08	R1	(Switzerland)	Basel	1–2	0–6	1–8
2009–10	QR2	(Slovakia)	Spartak Trnava	1–0	1–1	2–1
2009–10	QR3	(Sweden)	Helsingborg	2–1	1–2	3–3 (5–4 p)
2009–10	PO	(Romania)	CFR Cluj	1–1	1–2	2–3
2011–12	QR2	(Sweden)	Örebro	2–0	0–0	2–0
2011–12	QR3	(Czech Republic)	Sparta Prague	0–2	0–5	0–7
2012–13	QR1	(Malta)	Hibernians	5–2	4–4	9–6
2012–13	QR2	(Bulgaria)	Levski Sofia	3–1	0–1	3–2
2012–13	QR3	(Montenegro)	Zeta	2–1	0–1	2–2 (a)
2013–14	QR1	(San Marino)	Libertas	1–0	2–1	3–1
2013–14	QR2	(Albania)	Kukësi	0–0	2–3	2–3
2014–15	QR2	(Norway)	Haugesund	0–1	3–1	3–2
2014–15	QR3	(Greece)	Atromitos	1–2	3–1	4–3 (a.e.t.)
2014–15	PO	(Germany)	Borussia Mönchengladbach	2–3	0–7	2–10
2017–18	QR1	(Moldova)	Zaria Bălți	2–1	1–2	3–3 (5–6 p)
2018–19	QR1	(Armenia)	Urartu	3–0	2–1	5–1
2018–19	QR2	(Italy)	Atalanta	0–8	2–2	2–10
2019–20	QR3	(Belarus)	BATE Borisov	1–2	0–0	1–2
2020–21	QR3	(Montenegro)	Budućnost Podgorica	2–1	—N/a	—N/a
2020–21	PO	(Scotland)	Celtic	0–1	—N/a	—N/a

== UEFA Conference League ==
Season	Round	Country	Opposing team	Home	Away	Aggregate
2021–22	QR1	(Moldova)	Milsami Orhei	0–1	0–0	0–1
2023–24	QR1	(Georgia (country))	Torpedo Kutaisi	1–1	2–2	3–3 (2–4 p)
2024–25	QR1	(Kazakhstan)	Aktobe	2–3	1–0	3–3 (4–3 p)
2024–25	QR2	(Slovakia)	Spartak Trnava	0–0	0–3	0–3
2025–26	QR2	(Romania)	Universitatea Craiova	2–1	0–4	2–5
2026–27	QR1	(Finland)	Inter Turku	1–1	1–2	2–3

== Non-UEFA Organised Competitions ==
=== Intertoto Cup ===
Season	Round	Opponent	Home	Away
1962–63	GS	(Czechoslovakia) Slovan Nitra	3–2	1–5
1962–63	GS	(Switzerland) Servette	0–0	2–3
1962–63	GS	(France) Nîmes Olympique	2–1	1–1
1964–65	GS	(Czechoslovakia) Slovnaft Bratislava	2–2	0–1
1964–65	GS	(Sweden) AIK	2–0	0–2
1964–65	GS	(France) Angers	7–0	0–1

=== Mitropa Cup ===
Season	Round	Opponent	Home	Away	Agg.
1960	R1	(Hungary) Budapest	1–2	1–2	2–4
1965	R1	(Hungary) Vasas	1–2	0–2	1–4
1966	R1	(Austria) Wiener Sport-Club	2–1	0–3	2–4
1966–67	R2	(Italy) Cagliari	3–1	1–2	4–3
1966–67	QF	(Hungary) Újpest	1–2	1–5	2–7
1973–74	GS	(Hungary) Videoton	3–1	1–3	4–4
1973–74	GS	(Czech Republic) Žilina	0–4	3–3	3–7

=== Balkans Cup ===
Season	Round	Opponent	Home	Away
1961–63	GS	(Greece) Olympiacos	3–3	2–3
1961–63	GS	(Romania) Steagul Roşu Braşov	2–0	1–3
1961–63	GS	(Turkey) Galatasaray^{1}	–	–

^{1} Galatasaray retired from the competition having played two games against Olympiakos; thus, its record was cancelled.

== Club ranking ==
=== UEFA coefficient ===
==== 2025–26 season ====
Rank	Team	Points
264	(Cyprus) AEL Limassol	5.382
265	(Georgia (country)) Iberia 1999	5.000
266	(Bosnia and Herzegovina) Sarajevo	5.000
267	(Andorra) Atlètic d'Escaldes	5.000
268	(Gibraltar) St Joseph's	5.000

As of 17 August 2025. Source

== See also ==
- Bosnian football clubs in European competitions
- Yugoslav First League – Best finish in Europe by club
