= Säkkijärven polkka =

Finnish folk music

Säkkijärven polkka (Finnish pronunciation: [ˈsækːiˌjærʋen ˈpolkːɑ]; "the Säkkijärvi polka") is a well-known folk tune from Finland that is very popular with Finnish accordionists. It was popularized by Viljo "Vili" Vesterinen (1907–1961). The first record of the existence of the tune is from Säkkijärvi (now Kondrat'evo in Leningrad Oblast). Most famous and historical is the recording made on June 17, 1939 with former members of the Dallapé Orchestra. The recording took place in the ballroom of the German school in Helsinki. The recording became the most famous performance of the Säkkijärven polkka. The lyrics most used today was written by Reino Helismaa in 1953.

The tune was famously used in the Continuation War as a countermeasure against mines left by the Soviet army that would have been triggered by a specific chord sequence on a specific communication channel.

== History ==
This polka's melody had been played at least as early as the end of the 19th century in Southern Karelia, when it had not yet been named. From there it caught on in the repertoire of many accordion players of that time. The polka was mostly played by pelimanni from Säkkijärvi, which is where the song got its name. The melody has similarities to some western Russian and Polish tanhu tunes. "The church musician Primus Leppänen (1872–1934), who was the cantor of Säkkijärvi, wrote the polka notes on paper, dutifully marking it as a folk tune. He meant an orchestra piece with his polka notes, but it turned out to be a dance tune." This is what Väinö Seppä, a teacher from Säkkijärvi, said.

=== Väinö Kähärä and Willy Larsen ===
According to Toivo Tamminen, Väinö Kähärä, a pelimanni from Säkkijärvi, played an important role in the birth of polka, who combined three polkas he heard from his home region into one whole. After moving to the United States in 1927, Kähärä became a student in New York of the Norwegian-American-Finnish accordionist Willy Larsen, to whom Kähärä taught Finnish dance songs in return for playing lessons. The first Säkkijärvi polka was thus recorded by Willy Larsen in his own arrangement in New York in October 1928 under the name Säk'järvi polka for Columbia Records with piano accordion.

=== Viljo Vesterinen ===
Viljo Vesterinen recorded the song four times. Vesterinen's first recording took place as early as 1930 with Suomi Jazz Orkesteri. The recording was not an accordion solo, but the chorus of the song was sung by Kurt Londen (under the pseudonym Ilmari Rae) based on the lyrics written by RR Ryynänen. In addition, he recorded it in 1939 with the Dallapé orchestra and after the wars in 1947 and finally together with Lasse Pihlajamaa in 1952.

== Military usage ==
During the Continuation War, the Finnish Army discovered that the retreating Soviets had scattered radio-controlled mines throughout the re-captured city of Viipuri. These mines were set off when a three-note chord was played on the frequency the radio was tuned to; each mine had three tuning forks that oscillated at specific frequencies unique to each mine. Immediately after the conquest of Vyborg, the Finns were disoriented by the mine explosions. At first, the combat engineers suspected they were time-triggered mines. On August 28, 1941, the combat engineers found triggers packed in rubber bags in Antrea from a 600 kg explosive charge installed under the Moonlight Bridge. The combat engineers quickly delivered those devices to Headquarters in Mikkeli, which delivered them to the Communications Department. The Communications Department ordered Captain of Engineering (later Professor) Jouko Pohjanpalo to take them to Helsinki as a matter of urgency, and with the help of YLE, they were dismantled and investigated. It was subsequently found that mines had been located throughout the city. The Finns found out the locations of the mines from the Soviet soldiers imprisoned in the Soviet Union.

On September 1, the General Staff in Vyborg received one broadcast van from Yleisradio, capable of transmitting over the frequency used by the mines. The car in question was a REO 2L 4 210 Speedwagon taken from Nuijamaan auto Oy. The car was used by N. Sauros.

Säkkijärvi polkka was present among the van's record collection and to prevent the enemy from operating the mines, they started playing the Säkkijärvi polkka - and specifically the version recorded by Vesterinen - without any pauses. The frequency over which the triads (three chords) were sent out was jammed by the interference, preventing detonation. On September 4, it was noticed that Soviet troops were continuously transmitting the triggering triads on the same transmission frequency. The broadcast of Säkkijärven polkka continued for three days until another car was sent from Aunus to Vyborg. In the meantime, an examination of the dismantled triggers had revealed that Soviet troops had radio mines operating on three different radio frequencies. There was a great fear that the internal combustion engines running the broadcast van generators could fail, and therefore the military quickly ordered additional 50-watt transmitters from Helvar, which were delivered as early as September 9, 1941. These continued to broadcast interference transmissions until February 2, 1942. The military had calculated that the mine batteries would be depleted in at most 3 months.

== Other forms of usage ==
- Säkkijärven polkka was included as one of the ringtones for the Nokia 2110 (1994), the first mobile phone to feature them.
- An instrumental piece of the music was featured in the 2015 Japanese animated film Girls und Panzer der Film, played by Japanese kantele player Hiroko Ara.

== See also ==
- Ievan polkka
