= Robert Kaštrun =

Slovenian Nordic combined skier

Personal information
- Nationality: Slovenian
- Born: 25 March 1964 (age 61); Tržič, Yugoslavia

Sport
- Sport: Nordic combined

Robert Kaštrun (born 25 March 1964) is a Slovenian skier. He competed in the Nordic combined event at the 1984 Winter Olympics.
