= Viljo Vesterinen =

Finnish accordionist and composer

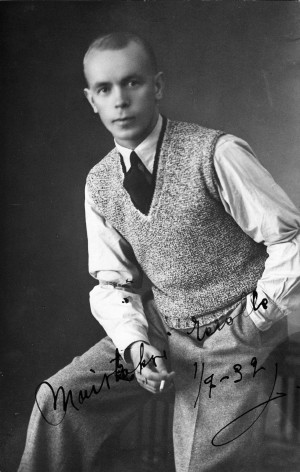

Background information
- Born: 26 March 1907; Terijoki, Grand Duchy of Finland, Russian Empire (present-day Zelenogorsk, Russia)
- Died: 18 May 1961 (aged 54) Helsinki, Finland
- Occupations: Musician, composer
- Instrument: Accordion

Viljo "Vili" Vesterinen (26 March 1907 – 18 May 1961) was a Finnish accordionist and composer.

== Early life and education ==
Vesterinen was born in Terijoki. He studied piano and cello at the Vyborg Music Institute, but as an accordionist he was self-taught. Vesterinen mainly played in different bands and theatres early in his career.

== Career ==
Vesterinen made his first recordings in 1929. Vesterinen's most popular recording is Säkkijärven polkka (1939). Even though it is not Vesterinen's own song, his version of the song is one of its most popular renditions. Other popular songs are Metsäkukkia (1931), Hilpeä hanuri (1936) and Valssi menneiltä ajoilta (1939). Vesterinen made a total of 130 recordings during his career. Heavy use of alcohol and cigarettes caused his health to deteriorate and affected his ability to play.

Vesterinen also appeared in some films. The biopic Säkkijärven polkka (1955) is the story of Vesterinen's life.

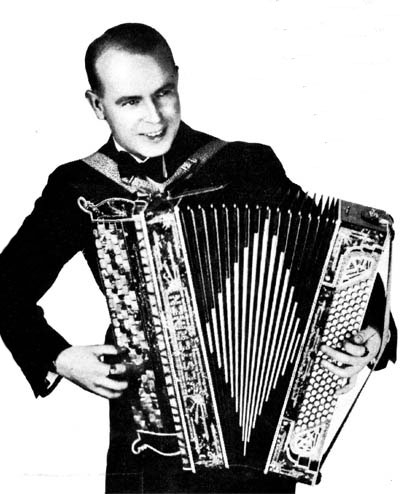
Vesterinen in the 1930s
