= Vladimír Podzimek =

Czech ski jumper

Personal information
- Nationality: Czechoslovakia
- Born: 12 May 1965 Jilemnice, Czechoslovakia
- Died: 17 May 1994 (aged 29) Jilemnice, Czech Republic
- Height: 1.76 m (5 ft 9 1/2 in)

Sport
- Sport: Skiing

World Cup career
- Seasons: 1984–1985; 1987; 1989–1991
- Indiv. starts: 45
- Indiv. podiums: 2
- Indiv. wins: 1
Medal record
Men's ski jumping
Representing Czechoslovakia
World Championships
Bronze medal – third place	1984 Engelberg	Team large hill
- Updated on 10 February 2016

Vladimír Podzimek (12 May 1965 – 17 May 1994) was a Czech ski jumper who represented Czechoslovakia.

== Career ==
He earned a bronze medal in the Team large hill event at the 1984 FIS Nordic World Ski Championships in Engelberg.

Podzimek's best finish at the Winter Olympics was 8th in the individual large hill at Sarajevo in 1984.

Podzimek's only individual victory came at the 1984 Holmenkollen ski festival, the only Czechoslovak ski jumper to do so.

Podzimek committed suicide by hanging on 17 May 1994.

== World Cup ==
=== Standings ===
Season	Overall	4H	SF
1983/84	14	53	N/A
1984/85	43	—	N/A
1986/87	23	64	N/A
1988/89	52	—	N/A
1989/90	38	40	N/A
1990/91	—	—	—

=== Wins ===
No.	Season	Date	Location	Hill	Size
1	1983/84	11 March 1984	(Norway) Oslo	Holmenkollbakken K105	LH
