= FIS Nordic World Ski Championships 1984 =

International Nordic skiing competition

- Host city: Engelberg/Rovaniemi
- Country: Switzerland/Finland
- Events: 2

The FIS Nordic World Ski Championships 1984 for teams in ski jumping and Nordic combined took place in Engelberg, Switzerland and Rovaniemi, Finland. These were extraordinary events because both were not held at the 1984 Winter Olympics in Sarajevo.

== Nordic combined 3 × 10 km team ==
March 17, 1984

Medal	Team	Points
Gold	Norway (Geir Andersen, Hallstein Bøgseth & Tom Sandberg)	1189.46
Silver	Finland (Rauno Miettinen, Jukka Ylipulli & Jouko Karjalainen)	1186.32
Bronze	Soviet Union (Alexander Prosvirnin, Alexander Majorov & Ildar Garifullin)	1183.54

Venue: Rovaniemi, Finland

== Ski jumping team large hill ==
February 26, 1984

Medal	Team	Points
Gold	Finland (Markku Pusenius, Pentti Kokkonen, Jari Puikkonen & Matti Nykänen)	618.3
Silver	East Germany (Ulf Findeisen, Matthias Buse, Klaus Ostwald & Jens Weißflog)	572.2
Bronze	Czechoslovakia (Ladislav Dluhoš, Vladimír Podzimek, Jiří Parma & Pavel Ploc)	564.1

Venue: Engelberg, Switzerland

== Medal table ==
Rank	Nation	Gold	Silver	Bronze	Total
1	Finland (FIN)	1	1	0	2
2	Norway (NOR)	1	0	0	1
3	East Germany (GDR)	0	1	0	1
4	Czechoslovakia (TCH)	0	0	1	1
4	Soviet Union (URS)	0	0	1	1
Totals (5 entries)		2	2	2	6
