= Walter Hurschler =

Swiss Nordic combined skier

Personal information
- Nationality: Swiss
- Born: 25 April 1959 (age 66) Engelberg, Obwalden, Switzerland

Sport
- Sport: Nordic combined

Walter Hurschler (born 25 April 1959) is a Swiss skier. He competed in the Nordic combined event at the 1984 Winter Olympics.
