= Jouko Pohjanpalo =

Finnish enginner and telecoms expert

Personal details
- Born: December 18, 1908 Kokkola, Russian Empire (present-day Finland)
- Died: April 3, 1992 (aged 83) Helsinki, Finland

Military service
- Years of service: 1941-1944
- Rank: Everstiluutnantti
- Battles/wars: World War II; Continuation War

The broadcast of the celebration on Independence Day. Jouko Pohjanpalo is on the left, face behind a hanging wire.

Jouko Jalo Pohjanpalo (1908–1992) was a Finnish electrical engineer and telecommunications specialist.

== Biography ==
Jouko Pohjanpalo graduated from high school in 1926 and received a master's degree from the Helsinki University of Technology in 1932. He received a doctorate degree in 1941, and his thesis was the first Finnish-language dissertation in the field of electrical engineering.

During the Continuation War, Pohjanpalo served in the radio office of Communications Headquarters I and III and was involved in electronic warfare.

After the Battle of Vyborg in 1941, the Finnish army was baffled by explosive booby traps left in the city by the retreating Soviets. Pohjanpalo discovered that each of the Soviet bombs relied on a strange detonator consisting of a radio receiver and tuning forks which resonated to certain musical tones. Pohjanpalo jammed the frequency containing the detonating tones with a powerful transmission of Säkkijärven polkka.

From 1935 to 1945, Pohjanpalo was a design engineer at Yleisradio. He was also involved in microwave research. From 1948 to 1972, he was employed by the VTT Technical Research Centre of Finland. Starting in 1953, he headed the VTT radio laboratory with the title of professor. In addition to his other work, Pohjanpalo also taught at the Finnish War College and the Helsinki University of Technology. The television club of the Finnish Radio Engineers' Association, founded in 1954 on his initiative, contributed to the establishment of Tesvisio, Finland's first TV channel.

Pohjanpalo died in 1992.
