= Sarajevo bid for the 2010 Winter Olympics =

Bids for the 2010 Winter Olympics and Paralympics
Overview
- XXI Olympic Winter Games; X Paralympic Winter Games
- Winner: Vancouver; Runner-up: Pyeongchang; Shortlist: Salzburg · Bern

Details
- City: Sarajevo, Bosnia and Herzegovina
- NOC: Olympic Committee of Bosnia and Herzegovina

Previous Games hosted
- 1984 Winter Olympics

Decision
- Result: Not shortlisted

Sarajevo 2010 (Cyrillic: Сарајево 2010) was an unsuccessful bid by Sarajevo, Bosnia and Herzegovina and the Olympic Committee of Bosnia and Herzegovina to host the 2010 Winter Olympics. It was one of eight candidates, but failed to be short-listed. Sarajevo was the only candidate to previously have hosted the games, having held the 1984 Winter Olympics.

== Venues and infrastructure ==
Although the city previously hosted the 1984 Winter Olympics, many of the venues were damaged in the Siege of Sarajevo. The proposal estimated the host costs at US$705 million. The Olympics would be extremely compact, with all venues located within 20 kilometers (12 mi) of the city center. Koševo Stadium was proposed as the Olympic Stadium, while Stadion Grbavica was to be used for medal ceremonies. Zetra Ice Rink was proposed rebuilt to host speed skating, while the existing Zetra Ice Hall would be upgraded to host short-track speed skating and figure skating. The existing Skenderija II Hall would be used for ice hockey. The existing sliding center at Trebević was proposed for bobsled, skeleton and luge, while Alpine skiing was proposed at Bjelašnica (men) and Jahorina (women). While the Alpine skiing venues exist, a new snowboarding venue was proposed at Bjelašnica and a freestyle skiing venue at Jahorina.

== Evaluation ==
The bid was regarded as the poorest by GamesBids, who stated that the attempt was more used to bring hope to the city's people than a realistic bid to host the games. Particularly the region's infrastructure—decimated during the war—does not even hold the same standard as in 1984. GamesBids also cited the country's poverty and questioned the country's ability to fund the games. However, it noted the city's high public support. The International Olympic Committee chose to not shortlist the application.
