= Vladimír Frák =

Slovak Nordic combined skier

Personal information
- Nationality: Slovak
- Born: 15 August 1961 (age 63); Levoča, Czechoslovakia

Sport
- Sport: Nordic combined

Vladimír Frák (born 15 August 1961) is a Slovak skier. He competed in the Nordic combined event at the 1984 Winter Olympics.
