= Jouko Jokisalo =

Finnish communist

Jouko Jokisalo is a Finnish communist who worked for the Stasi between 1978 and 1987. The Federal Ministry of the Interior in Germany has studied papers which reveal Jokisalo's history. His reports were sometimes delivered to the KGB.
