= Keijo Tiitola =

Finnish biathlete

Personal information
- Nationality: Finnish
- Born: 22 September 1964 (age 60); Pälkäne, Finland

Sport
- Sport: Biathlon

Keijo Tiitola (born 22 September 1964) is a Finnish biathlete. He competed in the 20 km individual event at the 1984 Winter Olympics.
