= Urpo Pikkupeura =

Finnish speed skater

Urpo Paavo Pikkupeura, a.k.a. Upi, (born March 22, 1957, in Rovaniemi) is a former ice speed skater from Finland, who represented his native country at the 1984 Winter Olympics in Sarajevo, Yugoslavia.
