= Tom Sandberg =

Norwegian former Nordic combined skier

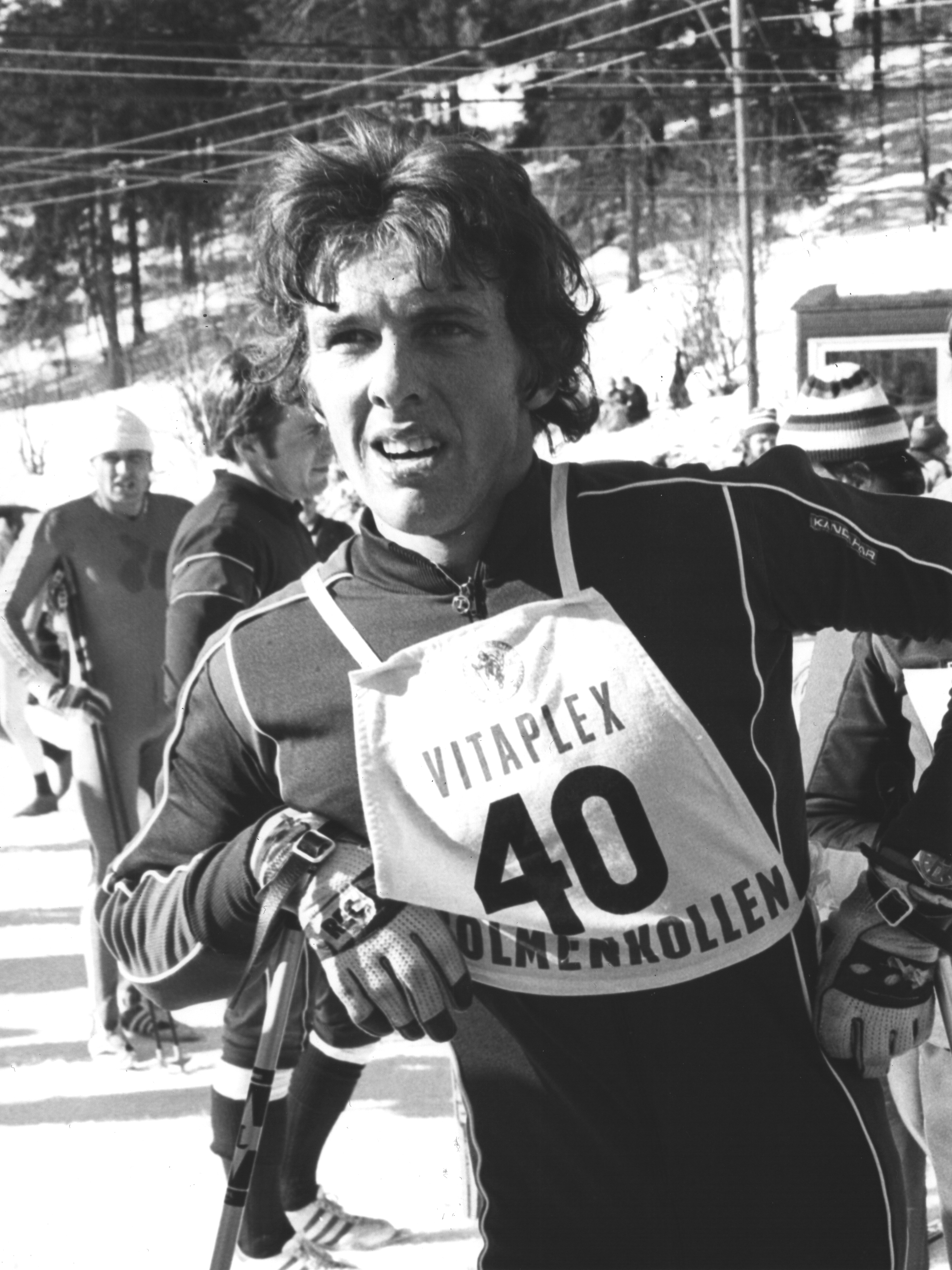
- Tom Sandberg in March, 1978

Personal information
- Born: 6 August 1955 (age 70) Mo i Rana, Norway

Sport
- Sport: Nordic combined
- Club: Mo Skilag
Medal record
Men's Nordic combined
Representing Norway
Olympic Games
Gold medal – first place	1984 Sarajevo	Individual
World Championships
Gold medal – first place	1982 Oslo	15 km individual
Gold medal – first place	1984 Rovaniemi	3 × 10 km team
Silver medal – second place	1982 Oslo	3 × 10 km team

Tom Sandberg (born 6 August 1955) is a former Nordic combined skier from Mo i Rana, Norway who competed from the mid-1970s to the mid-1980s.

During the 1982 FIS Nordic World Ski Championships, he won the 15 km individual event by 0.2 seconds over Konrad Winkler of East Germany. Sandberg also earned two medals in the team event at the world championships as well (gold: 1984, silver: 1982 – tied with Finland). His greatest year was 1984, when he became Olympic champion and won the World Cup. Sandberg also won nine national championships during his career.

Sandberg also won the Nordic combined event the Holmenkollen ski festival in 1974. Nine years later, he earned the Holmenkollen medal (Shared with Berit Aunli.).

He has his education from the Norwegian School of Sport Sciences.
