= Alexander Prosvirnin =

Medal record

Men's Nordic combined

World Championships
Bronze medal – third place	1984 Rovaniemi	3 x 10 km team

Alexander Prosvirnin (Russian: Алекса́ндр Просви́рнин) (24 August 1964 – 15 August 2010) was a Soviet (Ukrainian) Nordic combined skier who competed in the early 1980s. He was born in Vorokhta. He won a bronze medal in the 3x10 km team event at the 1984 FIS Nordic World Ski Championships in Rovaniemi and finished 14th in the 15 km individual event at the 1985 championships in Seefeld.

Prosvirnin finished sixth in the individual event at the 1984 Winter Olympics in Sarajevo. His best individual finish was second in East Germany in 1983.
