= Nordic combined at the 1984 Winter Olympics =

Nordic combined at the XIV Olympic Winter Games
- Venue: Igman Olympic Jumps (ski jumping); Igman (cross-country skiing)
- Dates: 11–12 February 1984
- Competitors: 28 from 11 nations
- Winning Score: 422.595

Medalists
1st place, gold medalist(s)		Tom Sandberg	Norway
2nd place, silver medalist(s)		Jouko Karjalainen	Finland
3rd place, bronze medalist(s)		Jukka Ylipulli	Finland

Nordic combined at the 1984 Winter Olympics, consisted of one event, held from 11 February to 12 February. The ski jumping portion took place at Igman Olympic Jumps, while the cross-country portion took place at Igman.

== Medal summary ==
=== Medal table ===
Rank	Nation	Gold	Silver	Bronze	Total
1	Norway	1	0	0	1
2	Finland	0	1	1	2
Totals (2 entries)		1	1	1	3

=== Events ===
Event	Gold		Silver		Bronze	
Individual	Tom Sandberg; Norway	422.595	Jouko Karjalainen; Finland	416.900	Jukka Ylipulli; Finland	410.825

== Individual ==
Athletes did three normal hill ski jumps, with the lowest score dropped. They then raced a 15 kilometre cross-country course, with the time converted to points. The athlete with the highest combined points score was awarded the gold medal.

Rank	Name	Country	Ski Jumping					Cross-country			Total
Rank	Name	Country	Jump 1	Jump 2	Jump 3	Total	Rank	Time	Points	Rank	Total
1st place, gold medalist(s)	Tom Sandberg	Norway	~~92.2~~	108.9	105.8	214.7	1	47:52.7	207.895	2	422.595
2nd place, silver medalist(s)	Jouko Karjalainen	Finland	~~89.6~~	100.6	96.3	196.9	15	46:32.0	220.000	1	416.900
3rd place, bronze medalist(s)	Jukka Ylipulli	Finland	~~97.9~~	103.7	104.6	208.3	5	48:28.5	202.525	5	410.825
4	Rauno Miettinen	Finland	97.6	107.9	~~93.6~~	205.5	6	49:02.2	197.470	9	402.970
5	Thomas Müller	West Germany	106.9	~~100.1~~	102.2	209.1	3	49:32.7	192.895	12	401.995
6	Alexander Prosvirnin	Soviet Union	~~91.5~~	101.8	97.6	199.4	13	48:40.1	200.785	6	400.185
7	Uwe Dotzauer	East Germany	99.5	~~89.0~~	100.0	199.5	12	48:56.8	198.280	7	397.780
8	Hermann Weinbuch	West Germany	~~94.3~~	102.1	99.5	201.6	10	49:13.4	195.790	10	397.390
9	Klaus Sulzenbacher	Austria	94.0	~~88.3~~	110.0	204.0	7	49:48.2	190.570	14	394.570
10	Geir Andersen	Norway	103.2	100.6	~~88.9~~	203.8	8	49:56.3	189.355	18	393.155
11	Hallstein Bøgseth	Norway	95.1	~~92.8~~	97.9	193.0	18	48:58.0	198.100	8	391.100
12	Sergey Chervyakov	Soviet Union	105.5	~~90.7~~	104.8	210.3	2	51:11.7	178.045	23	388.345
13	Kerry Lynch	United States	95.9	~~84.5~~	85.9	181.8	22	48:02.9	206.365	3	388.165
14	Aleksandr Mayorov	Soviet Union	~~90.1~~	100.6	102.1	202.7	9	50:27.8	184.630	20	387.330
15	Gunter Schmieder	East Germany	~~93.5~~	106.7	101.7	208.4	4	51:16.3	177.355	24	385.755
16	Andreas Langer	East Germany	97.9	97.2	~~88.1~~	195.1	16	49:52.8	189.880	15	384.980
17	Pat Ahern	United States	103.5	~~87.4~~	91.6	195.1	17	49:55.2	189.520	17	384.620
18	Dirk Kramer	West Germany	94.5	94.5	~~62.1~~	189.0	19	49:43.7	191.245	13	380.245
19	Espen Andersen	Norway	~~75.7~~	88.2	100.6	188.8	20	49:53.9	189.715	16	378.515
20	Takahiro Tanaka	Japan	92.1	106.5	~~90.6~~	198.6	14	51:05.5	178.975	22	377.575
21	Toshiaki Maruyama	Japan	~~81.9~~	88.0	91.4	179.4	25	49:24.9	194.065	11	373.465
22	Ján Klimko	Czechoslovakia	81.1	105.8	~~78.5~~	186.9	21	51:03.1	179.335	21	366.235
23	Ildar Garifullin	Soviet Union	84.3	~~61.6~~	82.2	166.5	26	49:56.5	189.325	19	355.825
24	Hubert Schwarz	West Germany	~~62.6~~	75.3	106.3	181.6	23	51:42.0	173.500	26	355.100
25	Vladimír Frák	Czechoslovakia	93.8	~~72.2~~	85.9	179.7	24	52:10.0	169.300	27	349.000
26	Walter Hurschler	Switzerland	~~60.2~~	64.9	78.9	143.8	28	48:12.4	204.940	4	348.740
27	Robert Kaštrun	Yugoslavia	~~90.6~~	100.1	100.6	200.7	11	56:09.4	133.390	28	334.090
28	Mike Randall	United States	70.2	75.6	~~70.0~~	145.8	27	51:31.0	175.150	25	320.950

== Participating National Olympic Committees ==
Eleven nations participated in the Nordic combined at the Olympic Games in Sarajevo.

- Austria (1)
- Finland (3)
- West Germany (4)
- East Germany (3)
- Japan (2)
- Norway (4)
- Switzerland (1)
- Czechoslovakia (2)
- Soviet Union (4)
- United States (3)
- Yugoslavia (1)
