= Jouko Leppä =

Finnish weightlifter (born 1943)

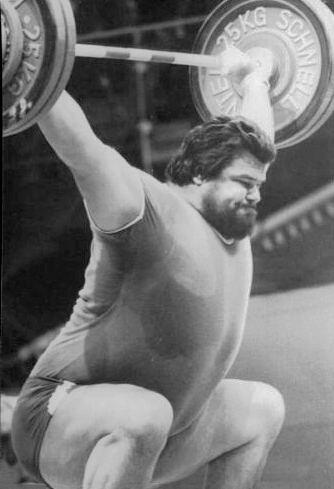
- Leppä at the 1977 World Championships

Personal information
- Full name: Jouko Matti Leppä
- Nickname: Pohjolan Othello
- Nationality: Finnish
- Born: 16 April 1943 Heinola, Finland
- Died: September 2025 (aged 82)
- Height: 187 cm (6 ft 2 in)
- Weight: 140–152 kg (309–335 lb)

Sport
- Sport: Weightlifting
- Club: Heinolan Isku, Heinola

Jouko Matti Leppä (16 April 1943 – September 2025) was a Finnish super-heavyweight weightlifter. He competed at the 1972, 1976 and 1980 Summer Olympics, and at every world championship between 1975 and 1980. His best result was fourth place at the 1972 Games.
