= Jouko Halmekoski =

Finnish writer (born 1937)

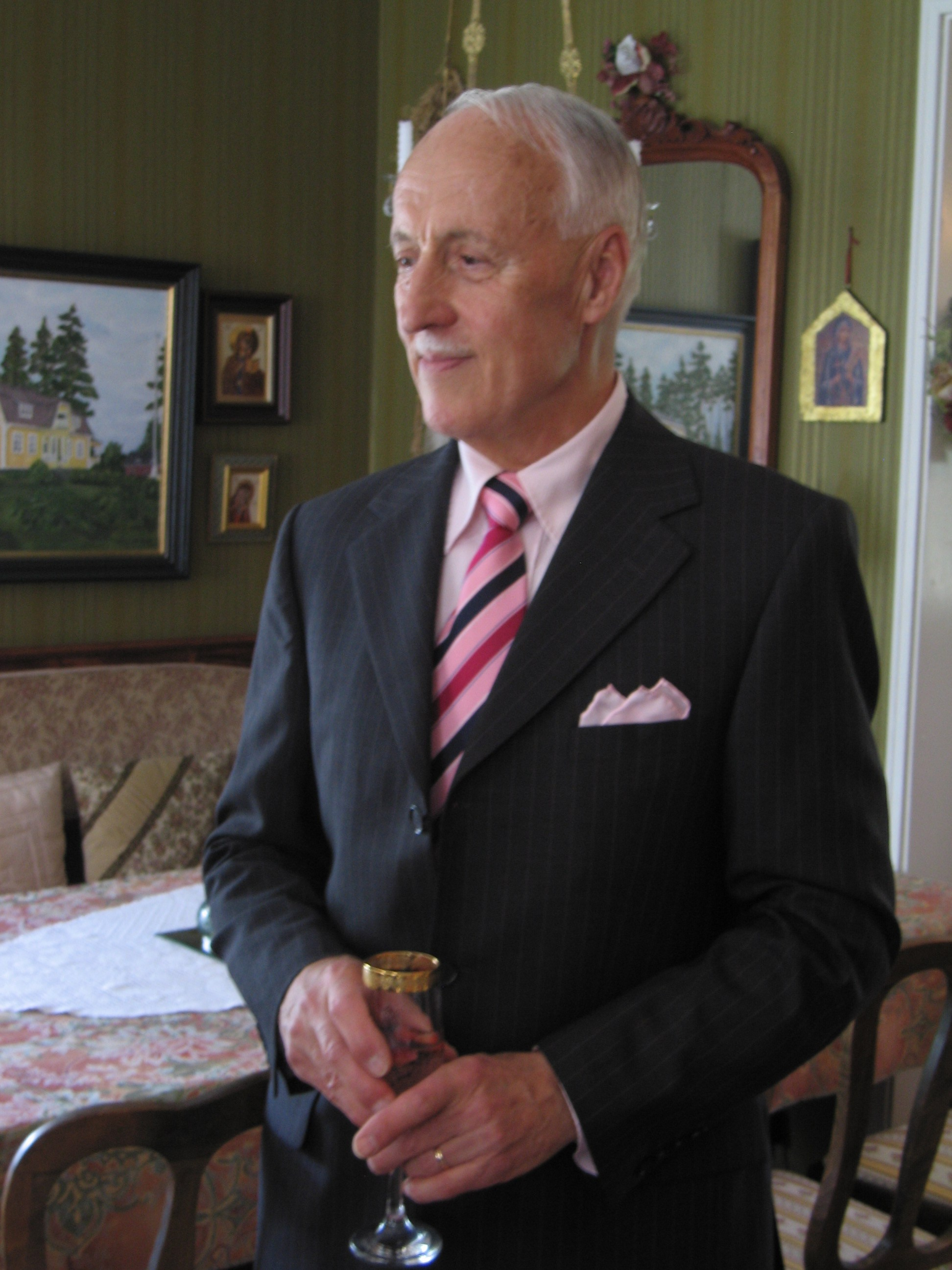
- Jouko Halmekoski on his 70th anniversary in 2007.
- Born: Jouko Halmekoski; 27 May 1937 (age 89); Asikkala, Finland
- Occupations: Technical director, novelist
- Spouse: Leena Halmekoski
- Writing career
- Genre: Non-fiction
- Subjects: Biography, war

Jouko Antero Halmekoski (born 1937, in Asikkala) is a Finnish writer who lives in Kalkkinen, a village near by Asikkala's municipality with his wife Leena Halmekoski. Jouko worked most of his life as a technical director in Asko furniture company. Halmekoski started his writing career rather late in life, at the age of 69. Jouko has also become known by a family chapel, "Temple of Peace", he built near his childhood birthplace.

== Production ==
Jouko Halmekoski started by writing an autobiography which consists of small stories about his life. In the book he also talks about his father, Hemmi, who was killed in the Winter War. Hemmi's body has never been found. Jouko's first book Sotaorvon vala was published in 2006.

Halmekoski's second books tells about his life and growing up as a war orphan. Book also examines how Finnish countryside and lifestyle has changed throughout the years. Kirkkonikkarin sydämellä was published in 2008.

For his latest work, Jouko has interviewed and collected memories of 24 Finnish orphan children sold in an auction "huutolaislapsi". Huutolaislapsi (auction child) was a child (often orphans or a juveniles whose parents were not able to look after them) auctioned and sold as a slave in marketplaces all over Finland. This child practice started in 1840s ended around 1945. Jouko has collected auction children's stories in his book Orjamarkkinat – Huutolaislasten kohtaloita Suomessa (Slave markets – auction children's destinies in Finland).

== Publications ==
- Sotaorvon vala, autobiography, 2006
- Kirkkonikkarin sydämellä, novel, 2008
- Orjamarkkinat – Huutolaislasten kohtaloita Suomessa, novel, 2011

== Other sources ==
- Writer presentation of Gummerus
