= Jouko Vesterlund =

Finnish speed skater

Jouko Valdemar Vesterlund (born 1 May 1959 in Rovaniemi) is a former speed skater from Finland, who represented his native country at the 1984 Winter Olympics in Sarajevo, Yugoslavia.
