= Ski jumping at the 1984 Winter Olympics =

Ski jumping at the XIV Olympic Winter Games
- Pictogram for ski jumping
- Venue: Igman Olympic Jumps
- Dates: February 12–18, 1984
- No. of events: 2
- Competitors: 65 from 17 nations

Ski jumping at the 1984 Winter Olympics consisted of two events held from 12 February to 18 February, taking place at Igman Olympic Jumps.

== Medal summary ==
=== Medal table ===
Rank	Nation	Gold	Silver	Bronze	Total
1	Finland	1	1	1	3
2	East Germany	1	1	0	2
3	Czechoslovakia	0	0	1	1
Totals (3 entries)		2	2	2	6

Finland led the medal table with three medals, one of each type.

=== Events ===
Event	Gold		Silver		Bronze	
Normal hill individual	Jens Weißflog; East Germany	215.2	Matti Nykänen; Finland	214.0	Jari Puikkonen; Finland	212.8
Large hill individual	Matti Nykänen; Finland	231.2	Jens Weißflog; East Germany	213.7	Pavel Ploc; Czechoslovakia	202.9

== Participating NOCs ==
Seventeen nations participated in ski jumping at the Sarajevo Games.

- Austria (5)
- Bulgaria (3)
- Canada (4)
- Spain (1)
- Finland (4)
- France (1)
- West Germany (4)
- East Germany (5)
- Italy (3)
- Japan (4)
- Norway (6)
- Poland (2)
- Switzerland (3)
- Czechoslovakia (5)
- Soviet Union (3)
- United States (5)
- Yugoslavia (5)
