= Jukka Ylipulli =

Finnish former Nordic combined skier (born 1963)

Medal record

Men's Nordic combined

Representing Finland

Olympic Games
Bronze medal – third place	1984 Sarajevo	Individual

World Championships
Silver medal – second place	1984 Rovaniemi	3 x 10 km team
Bronze medal – third place	1985 Seefeld	3 x 10 km team

Jukka Ylipulli (born 6 February 1963 in Rovaniemi) is a Finnish former Nordic combined skier who competed during the 1980s and early 1990s. He won a bronze medal in the individual Nordic combined at the 1984 Winter Olympics in Sarajevo.

Ylipulli also has two FIS Nordic World Ski Championships medals both in the team event, a silver in 1984 and a bronze in 1985.

He is the brother of ski jumpers Tuomo Ylipulli and Raimo Ylipulli.

== See also ==
- List of Olympic medalist families
