= Jouko Karjalainen =

Finnish Nordic combined skier

Medal record

Men's Nordic combined

Representing Finland

Olympic Games
Silver medal – second place	1980 Lake Placid	Individual
Silver medal – second place	1984 Sarajevo	Individual

World Championships
Silver medal – second place	1982 Oslo	3 x 10 km team
Silver medal – second place	1984 Rovaniemi	3 x 10 km team
Bronze medal – third place	1985 Seefeld	15 km individual
Bronze medal – third place	1985 Seefeld	3 x 10 km team

Jouko Karjalainen (born 27 July 1956 in Kajaani) is a Finnish former Nordic combined skier. He won two silver medals in the individual Nordic combined at the 1980 Winter Olympics and the 1984 Winter Olympics.

Karjalainen also has four FIS Nordic World Ski Championships medals, including two silvers (3 x 10 km team: 1982 (tied with Norway), 1984) and two bronzes (15 km individual and 3 x 10 km team: both 1985).

He also won the Nordic combined event at the Holmenkollen ski festival in 1981.
