= Frakk, the Cats' Nightmare =

- Frakk, a macskák réme
- Written by: Ágnes Bálint
- Composer: Zsolt Pethő
- Country of origin: Hungary
- No. of seasons: 4
- No. of episodes: 52

Original release
- Release: December 23, 1972 – December 12, 1987

Frakk, a macskák réme (lit. Frakk, the terror of the cats) is a Hungarian television show, written by Ágnes Bálint. The series was produced between 1971 and 1985, and used cutout animation.

== Plot ==
Frakk is a Vizsla dog who is living his life with a typical, sometimes ironically depicted married couple. Frakk, whose name means 'tailcoat' in English, lives together with Uncle Charles (Károly bácsi) and Aunt Irma (Irma néni), two Hungarian pensioners along with their two cats, Lucrezia and Meek (Szerénke), one of them black and the other white. Due to an old rivalry, the three constantly get into fights which are exacerbated by the strict attitude of Aunt Irma, who favors the two cats as opposed to Uncle Charles, who takes the dog's side.

== Production ==
The show was written by Agnes Bálint in 1971. Music by Zsolt Pethő. The 1st season's first episode created in 1971 (showed in 1972), the 2nd season was created in 1972 (showed in 1973), and a 3rd season came in 1978 (showed in 1979), the 4th season created in 1984 (the season showed in 1987).

== Reception ==
The show was very popular in Hungary and is considered one of the top animated shows that defined the decade of the 1970s for Hungarian children.

== List of the Seasons/Episodes ==
=== Season 1 ===
1. Diadal
2. Éji zene
3. A betegápoló
4. Egerészni jó
5. Fő a kényelem!
6. Árulás
7. Élőkép
8. Éjszaka fényei
9. Szerénke művelődik
10. Egy kis kényeztetés
11. Elégtétel
12. Pancsi-pancsi
13. Bizsu

=== Season 2 ===
1. Karácsonyi angyalkák
2. Macskabál
3. Számtanóra
4. A szomszéd kakas
5. Lábnyomok a vetésben
6. Beteglátogatók
7. A kerékpár
8. Majd mi megmutatjuk
9. A sonka ízű sajt
10. Ó, mely sok hal…
11. A megszokott kerékvágás
12. Kedves emlék
13. Vándorcirkusz

=== Season 3 ===
1. De jó sport a foci
2. Vegyünk neki labdát
3. A művelt eb
4. Egér pongyolában
5. Nyesőolló díszdobozban
6. Egy tollseprű tündöklése
7. Hajrá, vadmacskák!
8. Ki táncol Lukréciával?
9. A falkatárs
10. A csúzli
11. Gumicsont
12. Cinkemama küldi
13. Mit hoz a Télapó?

=== Season 4 (the last season) ===
1. Rézlakodalom
2. Kolbászkiállítás
3. Régiségek
4. Hol vadász, hol juhász
5. A kiskutya pizsamája
6. Az irigy kutya karácsonya
7. Gyere, kiskutyám!
8. A gyűjtemény
9. Zöld erdőben jártam
10. Kis kacsa fürdik
11. Csónaktúra
12. Egy cica… két cica…
13. Oh, az édes otthon
