= 2022 Oslo shooting =

Mass shooting in Norway

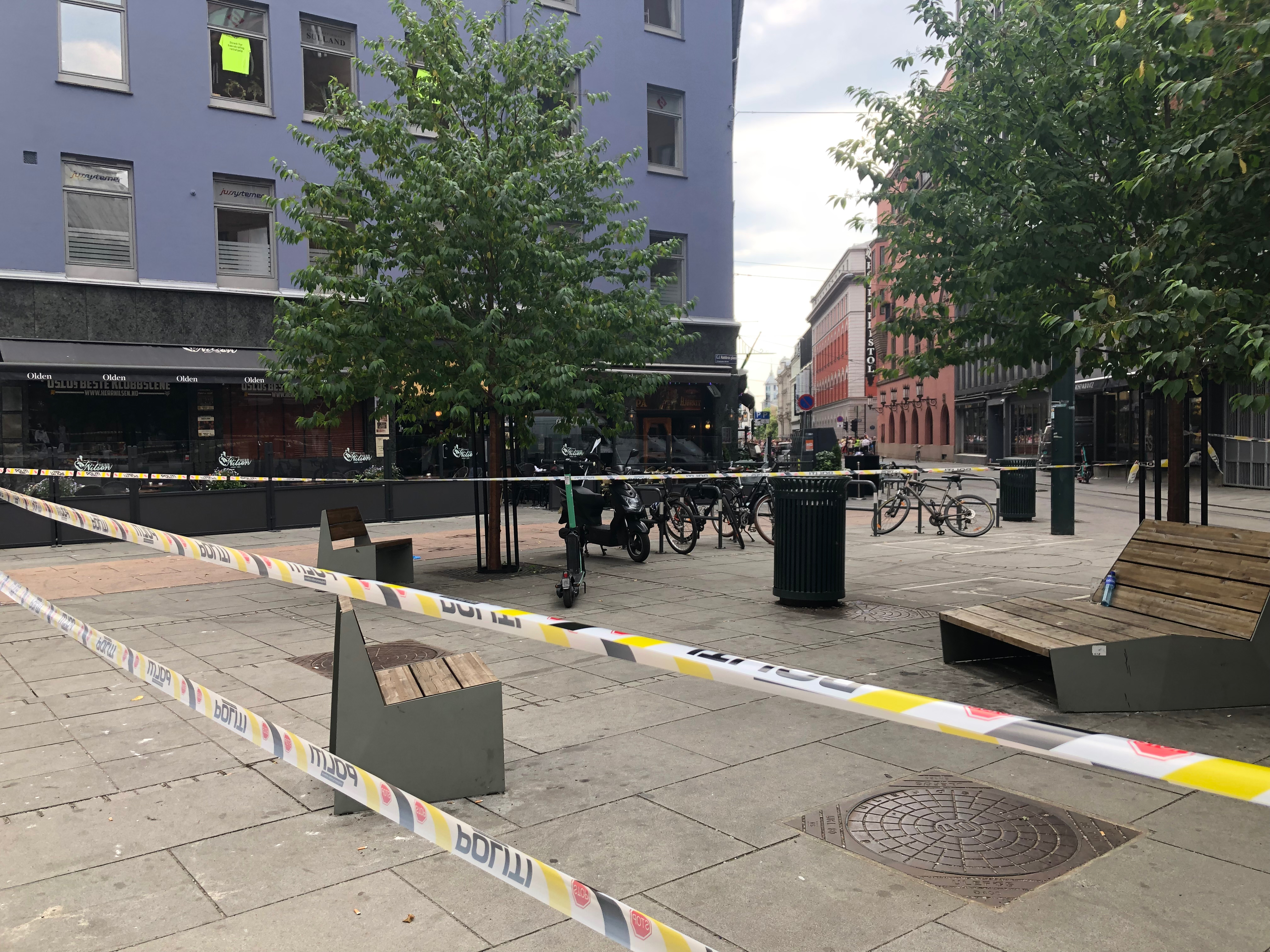
- The police blockade at the location where the shooting took place. The building on the left side of the picture, has the (mentioned) two bars and restaurant.

- London Pub (Oslo) London Pub (Norway) London Pub (Europe)
- Location: 59°54′55″N 10°44′26″E; Oslo, Norway
- Date: 25 June 2022 (CEST UTC+02:00)
- Attack type: Mass shooting
- Weapons: 9mm Luger P08 pistol; 9mm MP 40 submachine gun
- Deaths: 2
- Injuries: 21 (9 by gunfire)
- Perpetrator: Zaniar Matapour
- Motive: Anti-LGBT sentiment; Islamic extremism
- Accused: Arfan Bhatti
- Charges: Murder; Attempted murder; Terrorism

The 2022 Oslo shooting, commonly known in Norway as the Pride Shooting in Oslo (Pride-skyting i Oslo), occurred on 25 June 2022, when two people were killed and twenty-one people were wounded in a mass shooting in Oslo, Norway. Police declared the incident as an "act of Islamist terrorism". The target may have been the Oslo LGBTQ pride event, which was hosted by the local branch of the Norwegian Organisation for Sexual and Gender Diversity.

In July 2024, the shooter, Zaniar Matapur, was found guilty of two murders and 21 attempted murders committed with "terrorist intent". He was sentenced to 30 years in prison with minimum prison time of 20 years. The sentence is being appealed.

In 2026, a lower court handed down a verdict, in regard to the trial against an alleged facilitator, Arfan Bhatti; he will be imprisoned for at least 30 years; however, he has appealed the case.

== Shooting ==
The shooting occurred at locations associated with Oslo Pride, the local LGBT pride event hosted by the Oslo branch of the Norwegian Organisation for Sexual and Gender Diversity, the night before the planned pride parade in Oslo. The shooting occurred in front of the London Pub, a popular gay bar and nightclub, the bar Per på hjørnet, and a takeaway restaurant in-between both bars. A journalist from the Norwegian public broadcaster NRK who was present stated he witnessed a man arrive with a bag, then pick up a weapon and start shooting. The journalist thought it was an air gun at first, until the glass shattered at the bar next door. According to one witness, the perpetrator shouted "Allahu Akbar" as he started shooting. The gunman first took out a Luger P08 handgun and fired 8 rounds at the people in front of him. He then raised his MP 40 submachine gun and fired 10 shots in sporadic bursts. The gun jammed immediately afterwards. The gunman ran away from the scene of the crime.

As he ran away, the gunman tried to reload his submachine gun. A civilian quickly tried to tackle him. The gunman ran away and ran out onto Kristian IVs gate. Several civilians began to tackle and struggle with the gunman. The gunman fired his Luger handgun once during the struggle before being disarmed and overpowered. In total, the gunman directly shot 11 people while several more were injured during the chaos. 5 people, including 2 fatalities, were shot outside the Per på hjørnet, 1 person was shot outside the takeaway restaurant, and 5 people were shot in and outside the London Pub.

It was determined the shooter fired 19 rounds in total. 9 from the Luger P08 and 10 from the MP 40.

Police were called at 01:15 local time and arrived minutes later. The suspect was detained five minutes after the shooting. 80 to 100 people hid in the pub's basement during the attack, and wounded people were lying both inside and outside the bar.

== Victims ==
Two people were killed and twenty-one others injured, ten of whom were critically injured, while the other eleven sustained minor injuries. The deceased victims were a 60-year-old man, killed at the London Pub, and a 54-year-old man, killed at the Per på hjørnet bar. Both victims resided in Bærum.

Oslo University Hospital reported that it had gone on red alert following the attack. Ten people received medical treatment for serious injuries. According to Eskil Pedersen, a number of those present in London Pub, including himself, were also on Utøya during the 2011 shooting by domestic terrorist Anders Behring Breivik.

== Investigation ==
At a press conference on 25 June 2022, the police said that they believe the attack could have been motivated by anti-LGBT hate and intended to target Oslo Pride.

Matapour's lawyer John Christian Elden said they suspended police interrogations because Matapour is afraid that the police are manipulating them. Elden told Aftenposten that Matapour is afraid that the police will switch the recorded tapes and demand that everything must be written down. Zaniar Matapour refused to appear for questioning, adding an additional demand—that his interrogation be made public in its entirety.

In February 2023, media reported that on 19 June, an Islamist contacted a person on the chat service Telegram; the person contacted was an undercover agent of the Norwegian Intelligence Service; the Islamist wanted contact with IS and wrote to the agent that some "brothers" were planning an operation in Europe; the Islamist said that the "brothers" had two requests: They wanted approval from IS, prior to the operation, and the "brothers" also requested that the terror organization would take responsibility for the attack afterward, according to the information of newspaper VG. At the same time, the intelligence service knew the identity of the Islamist, even though he was using a handle/pseudonym (kallenavn); the agency also suspected who was pulling the strings (bakmann): Arfan Bhatti. After the attack, the Islamist (but not Bhatti) sent a news article about the attack, to the undercover agent. Shortly after the attack, Bhatti was put into contact with an undercover agent who was posing as "an emir, a leader of the Islamic State"; the contact was established as a result of the dialogue between the (first-mentioned) Islamist and the (first-mentioned) undercover agent; the "fake emir" and Bhatti, kept in touch, for at least 8 weeks after the attack.

== Trial of the shooter (2024) ==
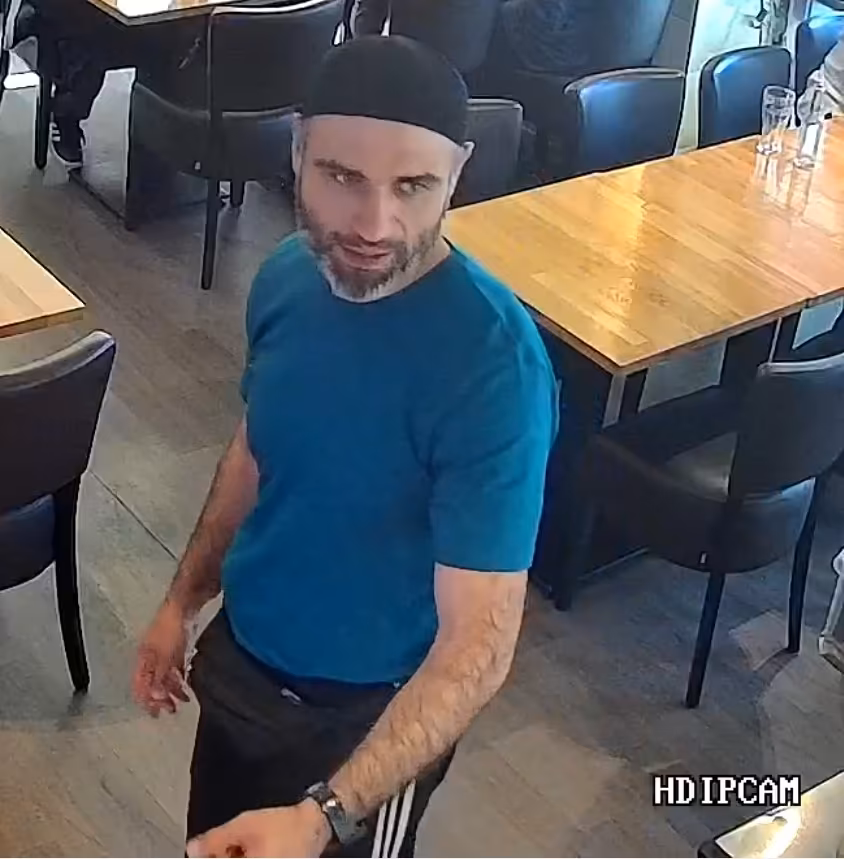
Matapour photographed at a restaurant in Oslo, approx. nine hours before the mass shooting.

In July 2024 the court handed down its verdict to Matapour: 30 years forvaring; the media called it the harshest sentence in modern times. Earlier (11 March 2024), the trial against Matapour started.

The suspect was identified as a 42-year-old Norwegian Kurd, Zaniar Matapour (born 26 June 1979), who moved from Iran to Norway in 1991 when he was 12. He has been charged with murder, attempted murder, and acts of terrorism. It is still unknown whether Matapour had accomplices.

Matapour had an extensive criminal background from drug and assault offenses, but had received only "minor convictions" prior to the attack, according to a Norwegian prosecutor. His mother said that he had previously been diagnosed with paranoid schizophrenia. On the day of the attack he was present and prayed several times at the Rabita Mosque.

According to the public broadcaster NRK, Matapour had been in contact with Arfan Bhatti, an Islamist extremist with several convictions for violence. On 14 June 2022, Bhatti, who has also been represented by Elden in the past, posted a burning rainbow flag with a caption calling for the killing of LGBTQ+ people on Facebook. Bhatti is a leading figure in Profetens Ummah, which has recruited people for Islamic State. Verdens Gang reported that Matapour had been stopped by police in April when he was in the same car as Bhatti. The police later confirmed that they had known of the suspect since 2015, believing that he had been radicalized into Islamic extremism.

Matapour's trial began on 12 March 2024. In May 2024, Arfan Bhatti [was] scheduled to appear in court as a witness. On 4 July 2024 he was sentenced to 30 years in prison, with a minimum time of 20 years.

Earlier, police arrested Zaniar Matapour, a Norwegian citizen from Sanandaj, Kurdistan Province of Iran, who had lived in Bergen, Norway, since 1991. They later confirmed that they had known of Matapour since 2015, saying that he had been radicalized into Islamic extremism. They also said he had a "history of violence and threats", as well as mental health issues. He has been convicted and sentenced to 30 years in prison for murder, attempted murder, and terrorism.

== Trial of an alleged facilitator ==
In September 2026, a trial against Arfan Bhatti started in an appellate court.

=== Trial and conviction in lower court in 2025 ===
A trial against Arfan Bhatti started on 2 September 2025, in the lower court system.

Zaniar Matapour was put on the stand, as a witness; He was not finished in court (as of the afternoon of 11 September).

Bhatti was still testifying (as of the first week of September 2025).

Earlier (August 2024), the court system decided to prolong (by four weeks), his detention.

Earlier (23 September 2022), police stated that Bhatti was suspected of involvement in the shooting, and that an arrest warrant had been issued regarding him.

== Charges against a female detainee in Syria ==
In November 2023, media named a third person that has been charged. Her name, Aisha Shazadi Kausar, was confirmed by other media in March 2024; Media said in November 2026 that she has escaped from the al-Roj (camp in Syria); earlier (and since 2019 before the shooting), she had been detained at al-Roj (camp in Syria); as of 2025, Norway had been trying to get her extradited through the new government in Syria.

- Aisha Shazadi Kausar; she is charged with having taken part in terrorism; However, she is in Syria (as of 2024).

== Charges being dropped, in regard to two other persons ==
As of September 2025, the government is not pursuing a (judicial) case against:

- A 38-year-old Norwegian-Pakistani (norsk-pakistaner); he had been charged with having taken part in terrorism.
- A 49-year old Somali citizen; he had been charged with having taken part in terrorism. This person took the stand (during the trial of Matapour), and that person's police interview was read to the court.

Five people were charged for having (at least) some responsibility for the shooting.

== Aftermath ==
The pride parade and related events scheduled to be held in Oslo were cancelled after the shooting. National Police Chief, Benedicte Bjørnland, said in a statement that all Pride events in Norway should be postponed since the LGBT community is considered the "enemy" by Islamist extremists. Police also advised people to celebrate Pride in smaller groups. Despite warnings, several thousand people still attended a makeshift parade, with armed police in the lead, and laid down rainbow flags as well as flowers at London Pub.

The National Police Commissioner Marie Benedicte Bjørnland announced a temporary nationwide arming of police officers in Norway. Additionally, Norway entered its highest terror alert level, although the Norwegian Police Security Service had "no indication" further attacks were likely to happen.

The Oslo Pride organisation organised a "Rainbow parade" walk for 10 September.

== Reactions ==
=== Domestic ===
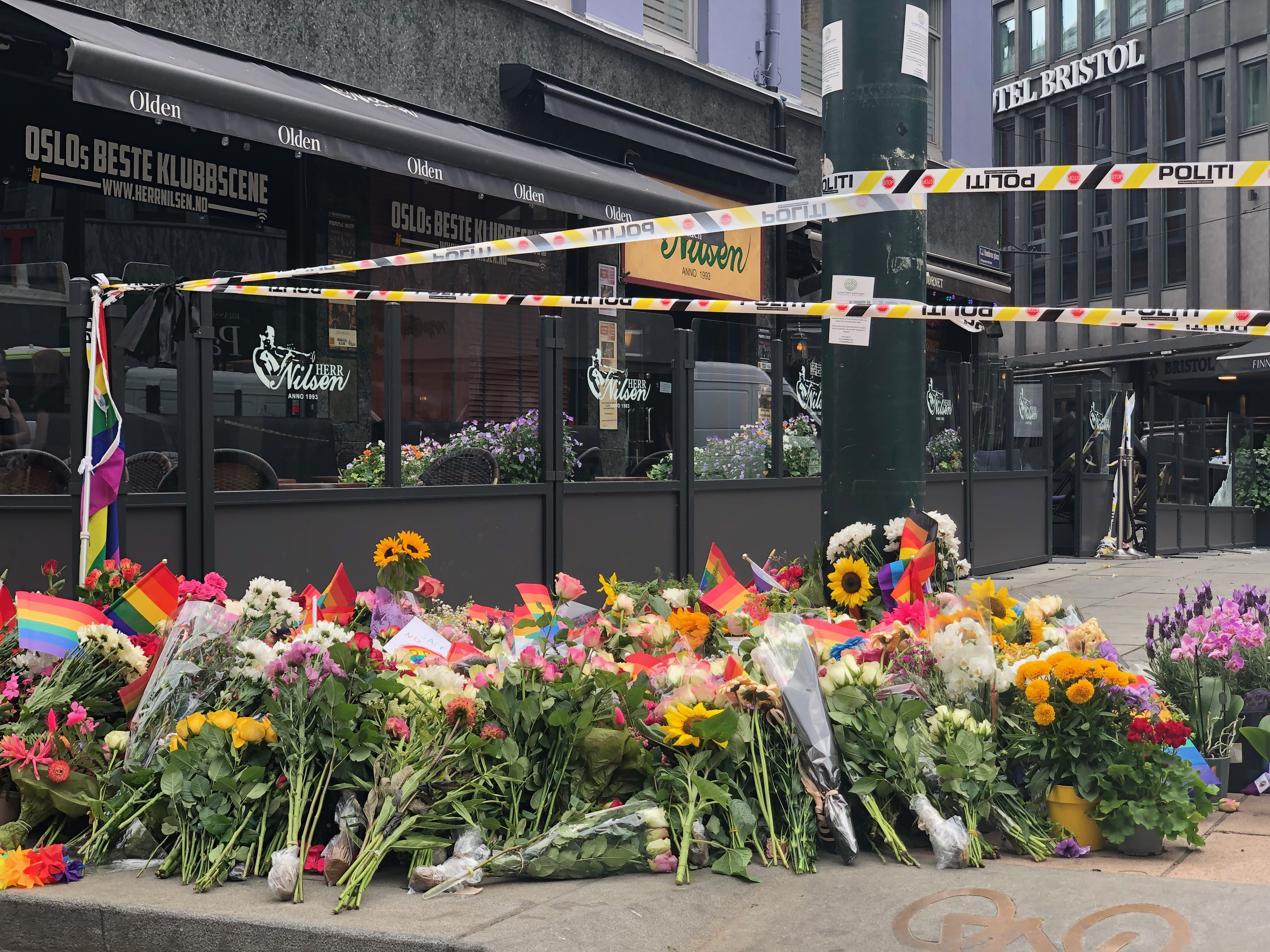
Mourners laid the flowers with rainbow flags at the adjacent Herr Nilsen Jazz Club, the same day after the shooting.

Norwegian Prime Minister Jonas Gahr Støre called the shooting a "terrible attack on innocent people", and expressed solidarity with the LGBT community. He added that the fight against hate was not over, but that it could be overcome together. Støre reiterated that while the perpetrator had Islamist motivations, the attack was the fault of an individual and not Norway's Muslim community. In his speech on the anniversary of the 2011 Norway attacks, the Prime Minister said that "we know that queer people are the targets of hate, threats and violence. The incitement of hate is especially virulent against trans people. We will not accept this in Norway. We will use the memory of 22 July, in respect for those we lost, to turn our backs on this hate." Støre also called on moderate Muslims to call out homophobic and transphobic attitudes and actions.

The president of the Norwegian Parliament Masud Gharahkhani, a Norwegian-Iranian, stated that it was "sad and unacceptable" that such a brutal attack could occur.

King Harald V stated that the attacks had horrified the royal family, and he expressed a need to stand together to defend freedom and diversity. Similarly, Crown Prince Haakon stated that Norway needed to protect the right "to love whomever we want".

Bishop Olav Fykse Tveit, the Preses of the Church of Norway, expressed his belief that love would gain new strength following the attack.

=== International ===
Many leaders of other countries were shocked, and gave condolences; some, such as French President Emmanuel Macron, encouraged people to stand together. Ursula von der Leyen, president of the EU Commission, expressed that she was shocked by the attack. Finnish President Sauli Niinistö and Prime Minister Sanna Marin gave their condolences on Twitter and condemned all forms of terrorism.

John Kirby, a White House spokesperson, stated that the White House was "horrified" by the shooting and expressed solidarity with Norway and the LGBT community.

== Analysis ==
Gender studies scholar Janne Bromseth said that the attack took place in the context of attacks on LGBT minorities and rights by the anti-gender movement in Norway, noting that "the anti-gender movement has (...) shifted boundaries in the public debate in Norway in recent years," resulting in "a harsher climate of debate where primarily organized TERFs have been given space to set the agenda for the 'debate on gender' and the alleged threat of 'gender ideology' to the natural order, although the criminal was a radical islamist, not a feminist, and his motives were religious." The head of the Norwegian government's Extremism Commission, Cathrine Thorleifsson, as well as Amnesty International, linked the attack to a pattern of increased attacks on LGBT+ people in Norway and Europe, both on extremist online forums and open social media platforms.

== See also ==
- 2022 Bratislava shooting
- 2026 Berlin Pride van attack
