= 2008–2009 Oslo anti-Israel riots =

2008–2009 Oslo riots
- Part of the Gaza War (2008–2009) protests
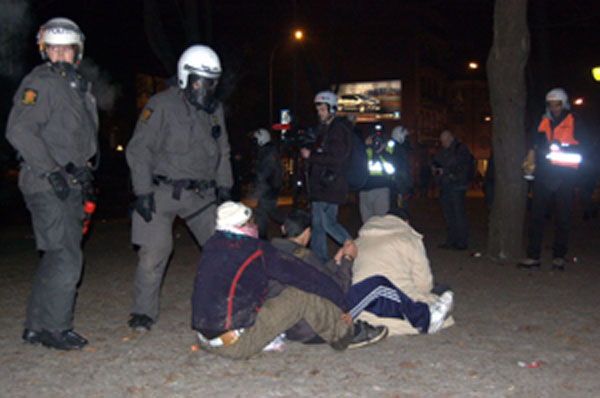
- Norwegian police officers with arrested rioters, 2009
- Location: 59°54′48″N 10°44′20″E; Oslo, Norway
- Date: 29 December 2008 – 10 January 2009 (1 week and 5 days)
- Target: Jews (primarily), LGBTQ community, Freemasony Lodge, McDonald's restaurants, pro-Israel activists, government/police personnel
- Attack type: Riots, arson, vandalism, hate crimes
- Weapons: Stones, Molotov cocktails, bottles, iron rods, fireworks, etc.
- No. of participants: Hundreds with direct involvement among thousands of protesters
- Defender: Oslo Police District
- Motive: Outbreak of the Gaza War between Israel and Hamas-led Palestinian militants on 27 December
- Accused: 200+ arrested (mainly Muslims and Blitz-affiliated leftists)
- Convicted: 10 prosecuted and less than 10 convicted

On 29 December 2008, a large-scale series of riots broke out across Oslo, Norway, two days after Israel initiated "Operation Cast Lead" against Hamas-led Palestinian militants in the Gaza Strip. Stemming from ongoing pro-Palestinian protests in the city, the initial riots took place outside of the Embassy of Israel and continued for almost two weeks. The most violent and destructive riots took place on 8 and 10 January, when hundreds or thousands of demonstrators spread throughout Oslo and attacked public and private property (particularly government buildings, McDonald's, and the Oslo Freemasonry Lodge) as well as civilians: the rioters mainly targeted Jews and people suspected of being Jewish, but also attacked people affiliated with the LGBT community and known and suspected pro-Israel activists. Additionally, violent clashes between the demonstrators and Norwegian police officers led to hundreds of injuries. Between 29 December and 10 January, the Oslo Police District had arrested around 200 people, mostly Muslims, of whom a significant number were registered asylum seekers. The rioters had been supported by left-wing activists of Blitz House.

== Timeline of the riots ==
On 29 December 2008, around 1,000 anti-Israel protesters moved towards the Israeli embassy in Parkveien, where speeches were held by people including Inga Marte Thorkildsen of the Socialist Left Party. Other organisations behind the demonstration were the Red Party, Red Youth (RU), Socialist Youth (SU) and the Norwegian People's Aid. The protest turned violent when around 100 youth, mainly Blitz activists and "young boys" breached police roadblocks and began throwing Molotov cocktails and stones at the embassy and the police, striking several police officers, amid rioters heard shouting "allahu akbar". Gasoline was drawn from nearby cars to set fire to trash bins that were launched against the police. Three windows of a hairdressing salon was smashed. Police responded by firing tear gas at the rioters, and eventually detained nine youths of which four were arrested, including two asylum seekers.

On 4 January 2009, an anti-Israel demonstration arranged by the Palestine Committee of Norway, Red Party and Blitz began outside the Norwegian parliament building and then moved to the Israeli embassy. Members of the crowd grew violent, and around 200 protesters including Hezbollah supporters began throwing stones and shooting fireworks against the police. The rioters were dispersed by police firing tear gas, after receiving several warnings.

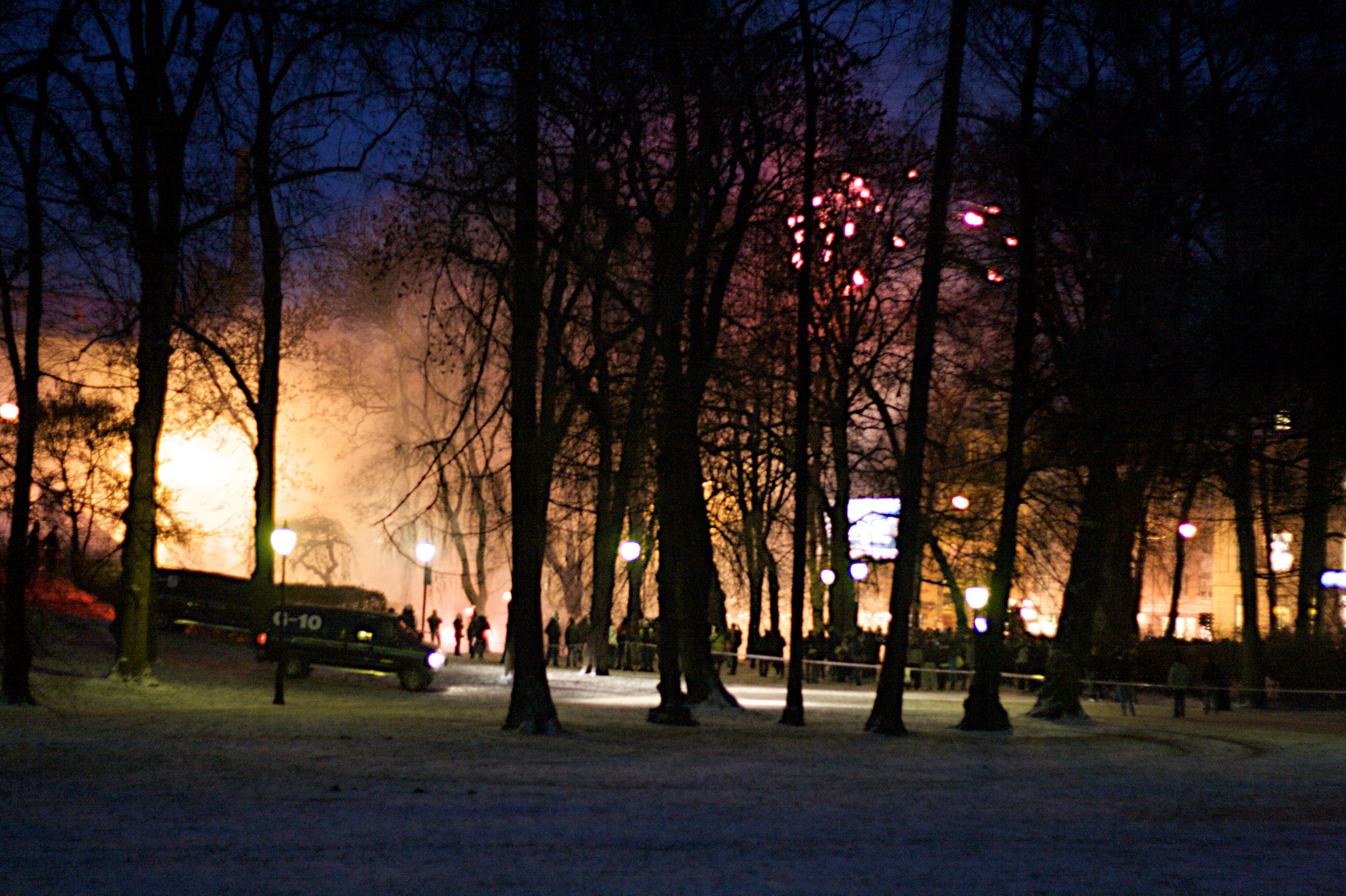
Confrontation between the rioters and police officers, 10 January 2009

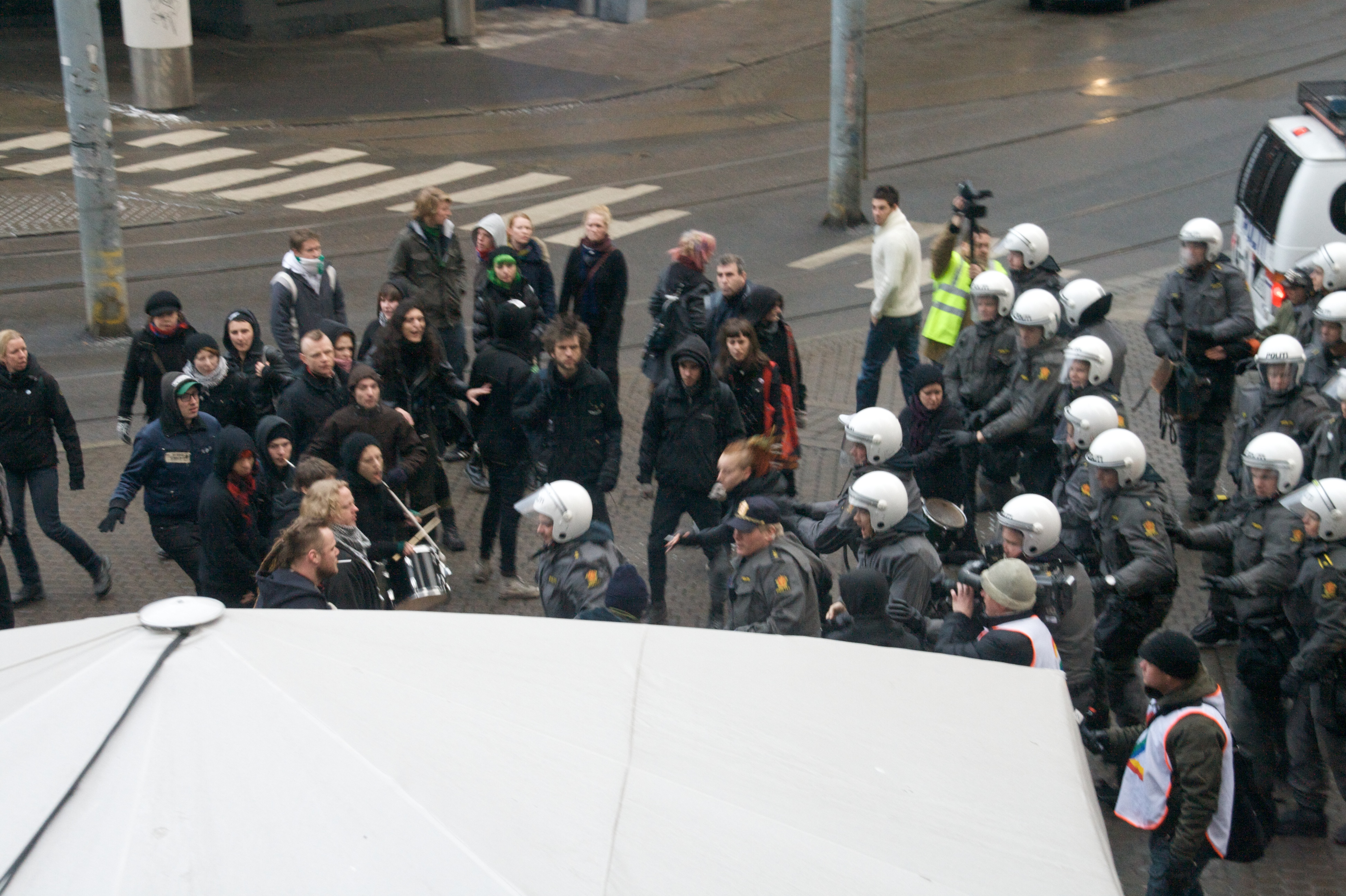
Police officers engaged in a standoff with Blitz activists, 10 January 2009

On 8 January, around 200 police officers were stationed out in anticipation of protests as a peaceful pro-Israel rally arranged by organisations such as With Israel for Peace (MIFF) was to be held outside the Norwegian parliament building, with the Progress Party leader Siv Jensen scheduled to give a pro-Israel speech. During Jensen's speech, anti-Israel activists started throwing rocks at the pro-Israel demonstrators, forcing Jensen to leave the podium. The police used tear gas when rioters attacked a bus that tried to evacuate pro-Israeli activists from the area, which included a large number of elderly demonstrators. A pro-Israel protester was attacked and injured by anti-Israel protesters shouting "take him, he's a Jew", "fucking Jew" and "allahu akbar". Among other slogans, protesters shouted "death to the Jews," "kill the Jews" and "slaughter the Jews" in Arabic. An additional fifteen police officers from the Asker and Bærum police district were eventually brought in for assistance. The final count reported forty shop windows to have been smashed in the riots, and several cars and buses damaged, including fifteen police cars. At least six people were reported to have been injured, of which five police officers, one mutilated in the face by an iron rod. Police said they had found several secret stashes of Molotov cocktails, club weapons and knives throughout Oslo during the evening. 37 mainly immigrant-background rioters were detained by the police, of which fifteen were brought into custody, and nine charged with violence against police.

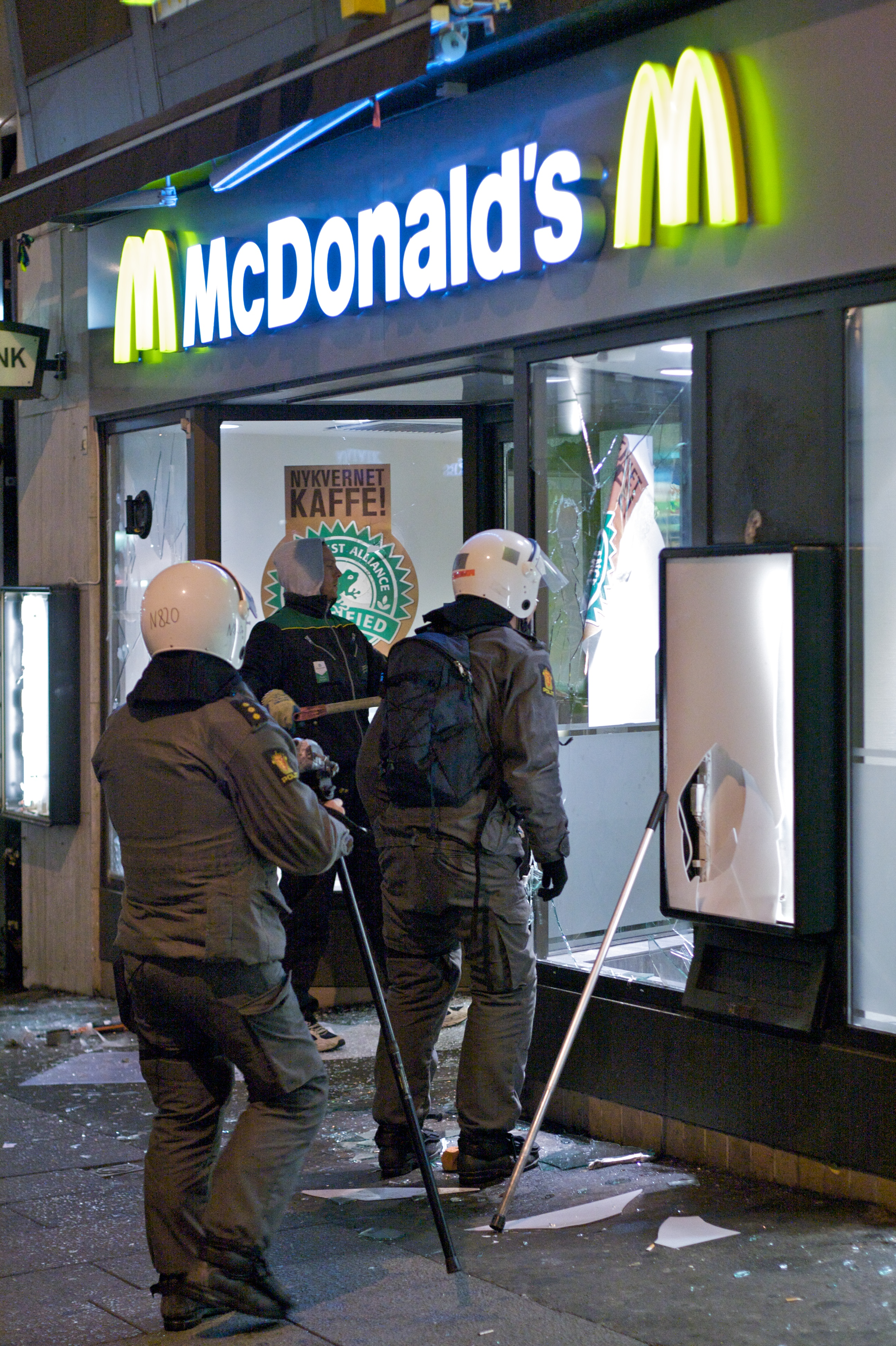
Police officers inspecting a McDonald's that was accused of "supporting" Israel and attacked by the rioters, 8 January 2009

On 9 and 10 January new anti-Israel demonstrations were arranged by an alliance of several organisations, including the Workers' Youth League (AUF), Red Party, Red Youth (RU), Socialist Youth (SU), Norwegian People's Aid, Islamic Association, and other pro-Palestine and Muslim organisations. Blitz stated openly that they supported the violent riots. On 10 January, 3,000 demonstrators were joined by the Norwegian Confederation of Trade Unions (LO) and Minister of Finance Kristin Halvorsen. The protest soon erupted into new riots as fireworks and rocks were thrown at the police and the Israeli embassy, with at least two people injured and several police officers struck by objects. The violence spread throughout Oslo, and numerous shop windows were smashed and cars damaged. Five McDonald's restaurants were destroyed in the riots because of a false rumor spread by text message that all the money McDonald's earned that day would go to support Israel. Some of the youngest rioters reported to have been told by older youths to "hunt for Jews", with one group severely beating up a shop owner accused of being a Jew. The Oslo Freemasonry Lodge, which hosted a children's Christmas party with 300 people was deliberately attacked with fireworks after crushing a window open, nearly causing a fire. The police detained 160 rioters during the evening, charging eleven with property damage and violence against police.

A total of 194 protesters were arrested during the 8 and 10 January riots. The police stated that they would investigate all the arrested and that most of them would receive fines of 9,000 NOK (around US$1,300). In the end, only ten rioters were prosecuted by the police, and less than ten convicted. The Oslo Trade Association called the small number of prosecutions by the police "unacceptable" and "deeply worrying".

== Analysis and aftermath ==
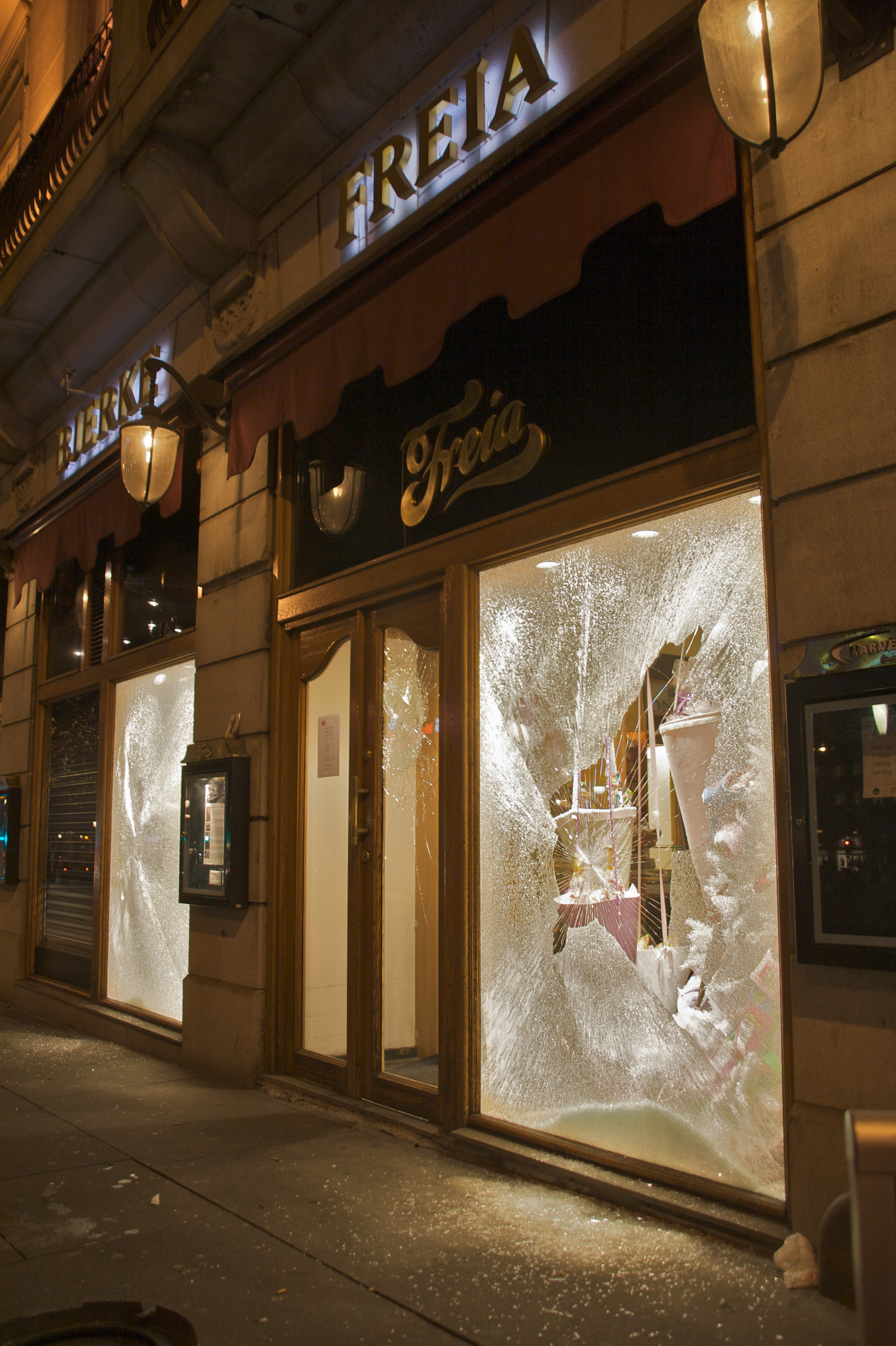
Local shop after being attacked by the rioters, 8 January 2009

In his book The Anti-Jewish Riots in Oslo (2010), Norwegian author and editor Eirik Eiglad, himself a socialist who was present in Oslo during the riots, wrote:

As far as I can judge, these were the largest anti-Jewish riots in Norwegian history. Even before and during World War II, when anti-Semitic prejudices were strong, public policies were discriminatory, and the Nazified State Police efficiently confiscated Jewish property and deported Jews on that despicable slave ship SS Donau - even then, Norway had not seen anti-Jewish outbursts of this scale. This country had no previous history of wanton anti-Jewish mass violence.

Police investigators noted similarities in the modus operandi of the Oslo riots with earlier riots in Paris and in the Middle East.

In cooperation with Norwegian education authorities, Islamic leaders in Norway initiated "dialogue meetings" with youths in mosques following the riots, with the aim of "using the Quran" to reach out to youths who had participated in the riots. Tariq Ramadan later visited Oslo and held speeches in the Rabita Mosque.

The riots have been credited by sociologists for "awakening" young Norwegian Muslims politically. Others have drawn connections to February 2010, when thousands of Oslo taxi drivers blocked the city centre, and 3,000 Muslims took part in an illegal demonstration against newspaper Dagbladet for publishing a Muhammad cartoon in the context of a news story about an internet link (which the newspaper strongly criticised), during which one of the speakers, Mohyeldeen Mohammad "warned" of a 9/11 or 7/7 in Norway.

The riots have later been noted as an important shared experience and common denominator for many members of the Norwegian Salafi-jihadist group Profetens Ummah, and Norwegian jihadists in the Syrian Civil War. One participant in the riots, leftist turned-Muslim convert Anders Cameroon Østensvig Dale went on to become an internationally wanted terrorist as a bomb-maker for Al-Qaeda in the Arabian Peninsula (AQAP).

== See also ==
- Antisemitism in Norway
- 2009 Malmö anti-Israel riots
