= Gender Recognition Act (disambiguation) =

The Gender Recognition Act 2004 is a law in the United Kingdom.

Gender Recognition Act may also refer to:

- Gender Recognition Act (Norway), a 2016 law
- Gender Recognition Act 2015, a law in Ireland
- Gender Recognition Act (California), a 2017 law
