= Ubaydullah Hussain =

Arslan Ubaydullah Maroof Hussain (born 1985) is a Norwegian former spokesperson of the Salafi-jihadist group Profetens Ummah. He has been arrested since December 2015, convicted for recruitment of jihadist foreign fighters, and for membership of the Islamic State of Iraq and the Levant (ISIL).

== Early life ==
Born into a family of Pakistani origin in Bjerke, Oslo, Hussain was an active ice hockey and football player with Hasle-Løren IL. Until 2011, Hussain was a football and futsal referee, overseeing matches in Norway and elsewhere. This included refereeing matches in the Norway Cup. In 2011, he ended a match between Romsås IL and Høland IL three minutes early, after he was threatened by Romsås players when he gave one of their team members a red card and awarded their opponents a penalty. He was dismissed as a referee when the Football Association of Norway were informed of his extremist views.

== Islamist activism ==
Hussain was influenced by British militant Islamist Omar Bakri Muhammad, whom he sent a letter to and received a reply back as a 14-year-old in 1999. He was later central in the establishment of the Norwegian salafi-jihadist group Profetens Ummah around 2011, alongside people such as Arfan Bhatti and Mohyeldeen Mohammad. Hussain has later claimed that he does not hold any formal position within the group, while declining to name the group's leader.

Hussain has praised numerous terror attacks, including the In Amenas hostage crisis, the Boston Marathon bombing, the Murder of Lee Rigby, the Westgate shopping mall attack and the November 2015 Paris attacks, commenting that the West should expect more attacks.

== Legal issues ==
Hussain was arrested on 25 October 2012, charged with making threats against two journalists, one of whom was Nina Johnsrud, and for hate speech against Jews. He was convicted in February 2014 and sentenced to a 120-day prison term, although he was released immediately due to the time he had already spent in custody.

On 8 July 2014, Hussain was charged with multiple counts of encouraging others to commit murder and acts of terrorism. He denied all charges. He was acquitted by the district court on 3 October 2014, the prosecution appealed the decision. He was finally acquitted on 22 June 2015.

Hussain was arrested on 8 December 2015, charged with recruiting several jihadist fighters for ISIL. He has been held in custody since then, suspected of having recruited at least seven people to fight for ISIL, while claiming to have withdrawn as spokesperson and member of Profetens Ummah.

On 4 April 2017 he was sentenced to 9 years in prison. The sentencing was upheld in a court of appeal in January 2018.

== See also ==
- Recruiting for Jihad
