= Recruiting for Jihad =

Recruiting for Jihad is a 2017 documentary film offering a close-up look at Ubaydullah Hussain, the Norwegian former spokesperson of the Salafi-jihadist group Profetens Ummah. For a three-year period, directors/journalists Adel Khan Farooq and Ulrik Imtiaz Rolfsen film Hussain's everyday activities promoting Jihadism until Norwegian authorities suddenly arrest him for providing material support of terrorism by recruiting for ISIS.

The documentary takes a turn as the Norwegian Police Security Service seize the footage from the documentary as evidence. The filmmakers has to fight to protect the rights of independent journalists to pursue news stories in the public interest while protecting confidential sources. Several Norwegian press associations reacted, claiming protection of journalistic sources. Supported by The Association of Norwegian Editors, Rolfsen challenged the PST, but lost in two lower levels of the Norwegian judicial system, before winning the case in The Supreme Court of Norway in November 2015. On April 4, 2016 this verdict was awarded the Columbia Global Freedom of Expression Prize in 2015.

The documentary was planned to air in 2015, but due to the seizure and subsequent trial Rolfsen was forced to halt the production. The film was released April 5, 2017 on NRK (Norwegian Broadcast Corporation).

US premiere on Sundance Now, AMC Networks' premium streaming service, on April 19 2018 as part of five original documentaries, curated as part of its TAKE 5: The Shadow of ISIS collection.

== Awards and recognition ==
- Gullruten Award for Best TV Documentary (Nominated)
- Official Film Festival Selection at DOC NYC, 2017
- Official Film Festival Selection at Hot Docs Canadian International Documentary Festival, 2017
- Official Film Festival Selection at AFI DOCS, 2017
- Official Film Festival Selection at IDFA, 2017
- One World Film Festival
- CPH:DOX
- Movies That Matter, 2018
