= Rabita =

Rabita may refer to:

- Rabita Baku, an Azerbaijani women's volleyball club
- Rabita Committee, a secular political party in Pakistan
- Rabita de Casablanca, a Moroccan handball team
- Rabita Mosque, a mosque in Norway

== See also ==
- Al Rabita Kosti, a Sudanese football club
- Rabta, an Algerian town and commune
