= Johnsrud =

Johnsrud is a Norwegian surname. Notable people with the surname include:

- DuWayne Johnsrud (born 1943), American politician and farmer
- Martin Johnsrud Sundby (born 1984), Norwegian cross-country skier
- Nina Johnsrud (born 1959), Norwegian journalist
