= Bastian Vasquez =

Norwegian terrorist

- Bastian Vasquez in the ISIL propaganda video of 2014
- Born: Bastian Alexis Vásquez Núñez; 9 April 1990; Skien, Norway
- Died: approx. 9 March/May 2015 (aged 25)
- Occupations: Hip hop singer and jihadist
- Allegiance: ISIL

Bastian Vasquez (9 April 1990 – 2015), also known by his nom de guerre as Abu Safiyyah, was a Chilean-Norwegian jihadist who made prominent appearances in propaganda videos for the Islamic State of Iraq and the Levant (ISIL). He is presumed to have died in January or in April/May 2015, in a non-combat infighting incident.

== Early activism ==
Born in Skien, Norway and of Chilean background, he was in a group of hip hop singers. Vasquez joined the Norwegian Islamist group Profetens Ummah, reportedly recruited by Mohyeldeen Mohammad, after having converted to Islam in his teens. He lived in Barcelona where he frequented Salafi circles. He then joined ISIL and travelled to Syria in 2012. He was due to meet in court in 2013 for having uploaded a video on YouTube, for which he was charged with making threats against the Norwegian government and the King of Norway.

== ISIL propagandist ==
On 29 June 2014 Vasquez appeared as the presenter in an ISIL propaganda video released by Al Hayat Media Center and titled The End of Sykes-Picot, where he is seen showing a group of captives in a building, after which the building was blown up with Vasquez seen laughing and praising Allah. He also appeared in a video where he described how he and others had killed Iraqi soldiers, and where a police station was blown up. Following the publication of the videos, he was charged under Norway's anti-terror laws and wanted through Interpol, while his bank accounts were frozen. Although often described as having risen through the ranks in the leadership of ISIL, others have claimed that his role was limited to propaganda work.

Vasquez is reported to have suddenly stopped all communications with people in Norway in January, or possibly in April/May 2015. He is presumed to have been killed as part of infighting in ISIL, with differing theories on the specific sequence of events. He could have been executed by ISIS after he had killed the son of Arfan Bhatti, a leading figure in the Norwegian Islamist group Profetens Ummah, or killed while making bombs for ISIS in March 2015.

== See also ==
- List of fugitives from justice who disappeared
