= LGBTQ rights in Norway =

- Location of Norway (dark green) in Europe (dark grey) – [Legend]
- Legal status: Legal since 1972
- Gender identity: Transgender people allowed to change legal sex based on self-determination
- Military: LGBT people allowed to serve openly.
- Discrimination protections: Sexual orientation, gender identity/expression, intersex status protections (see below)

Family rights
- Recognition of relationships: Same-sex marriage since 2009
- Adoption: Full adoption rights since 2009

The rights of lesbian, gay, bisexual, and transgender (LGBT) people in Norway are among the most advanced in the world. In 1981, Norway became one of the first countries in the world to enact an anti-discrimination law explicitly including sexual orientation. Same-sex marriage, adoption, and assisted insemination treatments for lesbian couples have been legal since 2009. In 2016, Norway became the fourth country in Europe to pass a law allowing the change of legal sex for transgender people based on self-determination. On 1 January 2024, conversion therapy became legally banned within Norway.

Much like the other Nordic countries, Norway is frequently referred to as one of the world's most LGBTQ-friendly nations, with high societal acceptance and tolerance of LGBTQ people. Opinion polls in 2018 found very high levels of support for same-sex marriage among the Norwegian public. In 2024, Norway was ranked as the best country for same-sex couples to legally marry.

== Legality of same-sex sexual activity ==
Same-sex sexual activity between men has been legal since 1972. Same-sex acts between women were not penalized in Norway. The age of consent is set at 16 years, regardless of gender and of sexual orientation.

In April 2022, on the 50th anniversary of the legalization, the government of Norway made formal apologies to all victims of the ban on sex between men.

== Recognition of same-sex relationships ==
On 18 November 2004, two MPs from the Socialist Left Party introduced a bill to abolish the existing registered partnership law, and make the marriage law gender-neutral. The move was withdrawn and replaced by a request that the cabinet further investigate the issue. The conservative cabinet of that time did not look into the issue. However, the second Stoltenberg Cabinet announced a common, unified marriage act as part of its foundation document, the Soria Moria statement. A public hearing was opened on 16 May 2007.

On 29 May 2008, the Associated Press reported that two Norwegian opposition parties had come out in favour of the new bill, assuring its passage in the Storting. Prior to this, there were some disagreements with members of the current three-party governing coalition on whether the bill had enough votes to pass.

On 14 March 2008, the Norwegian Government proposed a marriage bill that would give lesbian and gay couples the same rights as heterosexuals, including religious weddings (if the church so chooses), adoption and assisted pregnancies. The first parliamentary hearing was held on 11 June 2008, where the bill was approved by 84 votes to 41. The new legislation amended the definition of civil marriage to make it gender-neutral. Norway's upper legislative chamber (Lagtinget) passed the bill in a 23–17 vote. The King of Norway granted royal assent thereafter. The law took effect on 1 January 2009.

Prior to the gender-neutral marriage law, a registered partnership law had been in effect since 1993. Partnerskapsloven, as it was known in Norwegian, granted many marriage rights to same-sex couples, only without calling it marriage. Since 1991, unregistered same-sex cohabitation has been recognized by the state for the granting of limited rights, such as being considered as next of kin for medical decisions, and in the event of wrongful death of one partner the other partner was entitled to compensation.

In 2014, the Church of Norway's National Council voted down a proposal to perform same-sex marriages in the church. In 2015, it reversed course and voted to allow same-sex marriages to take place in its churches. The decision was ratified at the annual conference on 11 April 2016. In August 2023, the Church of Norway formally removed the "archaic and draconian cohabitation ban". Now cohabiting same-sex couples (as employees of the Church of Norway) are fully recognised.

== Adoption and family planning ==
Married and committed same-sex couples are permitted to adopt under Norwegian law. Stepchild adoption has been allowed for registered partners since 2002. Full adoption rights were granted to same-sex couples in 2009. Additionally, lesbian couples have access to artificial insemination. Pursuant to the same-sex marriage law, when a woman who is married to or in a stable co-habiting relationship with another woman becomes pregnant through artificial insemination, the other partner will have all the rights and duties of parenthood "from the moment of conception".

== Military status ==
Lesbian, gay and bisexual people can serve openly in the Armed Forces. They have had full rights and anti-discrimination protections since 1979. Transgender persons may serve openly as well.

== Discrimination protections and hate crime laws ==
In 1981, Norway became the first country in the world to enact a law to prevent discrimination against LGBT people by amending Paragraph 349a of its Penal Code, prohibiting discrimination based on sexual orientation in the provision of goods or services and in access to public gatherings. In the same year, Paragraph 135a of the Penal Code was amended to prohibit hate speech on account of sexual orientation. The country has banned discrimination based on sexual orientation in employment since 1998. Norway also has a law prohibiting discrimination based on gender identity and expression since 2013, and is one of the few countries in the world to explicitly protect intersex people from discrimination.

Section 5 of the Act on the Prohibition of Discrimination on the grounds of Sexual Orientation, Gender Identity and Gender Expression (Norwegian: Lov om forbud mot diskriminering på grunn av seksuell orientering, kjønnsidentitet og kjønnsuttrykk), enacted in 2013, states as follows:

Discrimination on the basis of sexual orientation, gender identity or gender expression shall be prohibited. The prohibition shall apply to discrimination on the basis of actual, assumed, former or future sexual orientation, gender identity or gender expression. "Discrimination" shall mean direct and indirect differential treatment that is not lawful, [...], and that is due to sexual orientation, gender identity or gender expression.

=== Bias-motivated violence and speech ===
According to a 2013 survey entitled "Sexual orientation and living conditions" (Seksuell orientering og levekår) from the University of Bergen, nine out of ten LGBT respondents reported not being exposed to discrimination or harassment at the workplace. In addition, only a small minority stated they had been physically assaulted, and suicide among LGBT people has significantly decreased since the 1990s. Nevertheless, homosexual boys reported a six times higher occurrence of bullying in schools than heterosexual boys.

According to the Oslo Police District, 238 bias-motivated crimes had occurred in Oslo in 2018, of which 20 percent related to LGBT status; the remaining relating to ethnicity (57%), religion (17%), disability (3%) or anti-Semitism (3%).

The Norwegian Institute of Social Research reported in 2019 that LGBT people were more at risk of experiencing hate speech. Fifteen percent of LGBT respondents reported having been the target of personal threats, mostly online, compared to four percent among the general population.

In November 2020, the Storting amended the country's hate speech law to protect bisexual and transgender people. The law has protected gay and lesbian people from hate speech since 1981.

== Transgender rights ==
On 18 March 2016, the Solberg Government introduced a bill to allow legal sex change without any form of psychiatric or psychological evaluation, diagnosis or any kind of medical intervention, by people aged at least 16. Minors aged between 6 and 16 may transition with parental consent. The bill was approved by a vote of 79–13 by Parliament on 6 June. It was promulgated on 17 June and took effect on 1 July 2016. One month after the law took effect, 190 people had already applied to change their gender.

=== Healthcare ===
Access to gender affirming healthcare in Norway still requires a psychiatric diagnosis, at which point the patient is referred to the National Treatment Centre for Gender Incongruence (NTCGI) at Oslo University Hospital. Prior to 2020, treatment was not offered to nonbinary patients. Only a quarter of referred patients are allowed access to gender-affirming healthcare, with those disqualified having no alternative options.

In 2020, the Norwegian Directorate for Health, the governmental body that develops health guidelines, released one for gender incongruence recommending puberty blockers between Tanner stage 2 and the age of 16 following an interdisciplinary assessment, stating they were reversible and there is no reliable evidence of adverse long-term effects.

In February 2023, Esben Esther Pirelli Benestad, one of the leading transgender healthcare providers in Norway, was stripped of their medical licence over, ostensibly, the provision of gender-affirming treatment which diverged from the guidelines of the NTCGI. Media reporting depicted the delicencing as part of the ongoing disputes over best practice in transgender healthcare. They appealed the decision of the Norwegian Board of Health Supervision and had their medical licence conditionally restored, in part, in April 2023.

In 2023, the Norwegian Healthcare Investigation Board, an independent non-governmental organization, issued a non-binding report finding "there is insufficient evidence for the use of puberty blockers and cross sex hormone treatments in young people" and recommended changing to a cautious approach. The Norwegian Healthcare Investigation Board is not responsible for setting healthcare policy, and the Directorate, which is, has not implemented the recommendations, though they have said they are considering them. Misinformation that Norway had banned gender affirming care proliferated on social media.

A 2023 report reported that many patients reported negative experiences with the public treatment service, including patients not being taken seriously, leading to many losing confidence in the service. Non-binary people were still without treatment, despite the relevant guideline from 2020 explicitly calling for equal access to treatment for non-binary people. The report also highlighted a lack of competence related to diversity in gender and sexuality among medical practitioners.

== Intersex rights ==
Intersex infants in Norway may undergo medical interventions to have their sex characteristics altered. Human rights groups increasingly consider these surgeries unnecessary and, they argue, should only be performed if the applicant consents to the operation. A 2019 survey from the Oslo University Hospital showed that two out of three medical professionals were willing to perform such surgeries, and parents were overall supportive of the move. In March 2019, the Norwegian Directorate for Children, Youth and Family Affairs published two reports, recommending postponing such medical interventions on intersex infants until they are able to consent.

== Conversion therapy ==
In 2000, the Norwegian Psychiatric Association overwhelmingly voted for the position statement that "homosexuality is no disorder or illness, and can therefore not be subject to treatment. A 'treatment' with the only aim of changing sexual orientation from homosexual to heterosexual must be regarded as ethical malpractice, and should have no place in the health system". Membership of the Norwegian Psychiatric Association accounts for at least 90 percent of authorized psychiatrists in Norway.

On 12 December 2023, a bill banning conversion therapy was approved by the Parliament in a 85–15 vote. The ban had been under discussion since December 2019. Substantive discussion in the Storting of laws to enact the ban were delayed until Autumn (April–June) 2023, due to opposition by some government ministers. The law prohibiting conversion therapy came into effect on 1 January 2024.

== Health and blood donation ==
In Norway, as in many other countries, men who have sex with men (MSM) were previously not allowed to donate blood. In June 2016, the Norwegian Directorate for Health and Social Affairs announced it would make an end to this ban, and implement a 12-month deferral period instead, whereby MSM applicants would be permitted to donate provided they have not had sex in a year. The new 1 year deferral period was implemented on 1 June 2017.

In October 2016, Minister of Health and Care Services Bent Høie made the announcement that the HIV-prevention drug, PrEP, would be offered free of charge as part of Norway's health care system.

A policy to end discrimination against men who have sex with men donating blood was planned to go into effect in 2024, but was ultimately indefinitely postponed.

== Living conditions ==
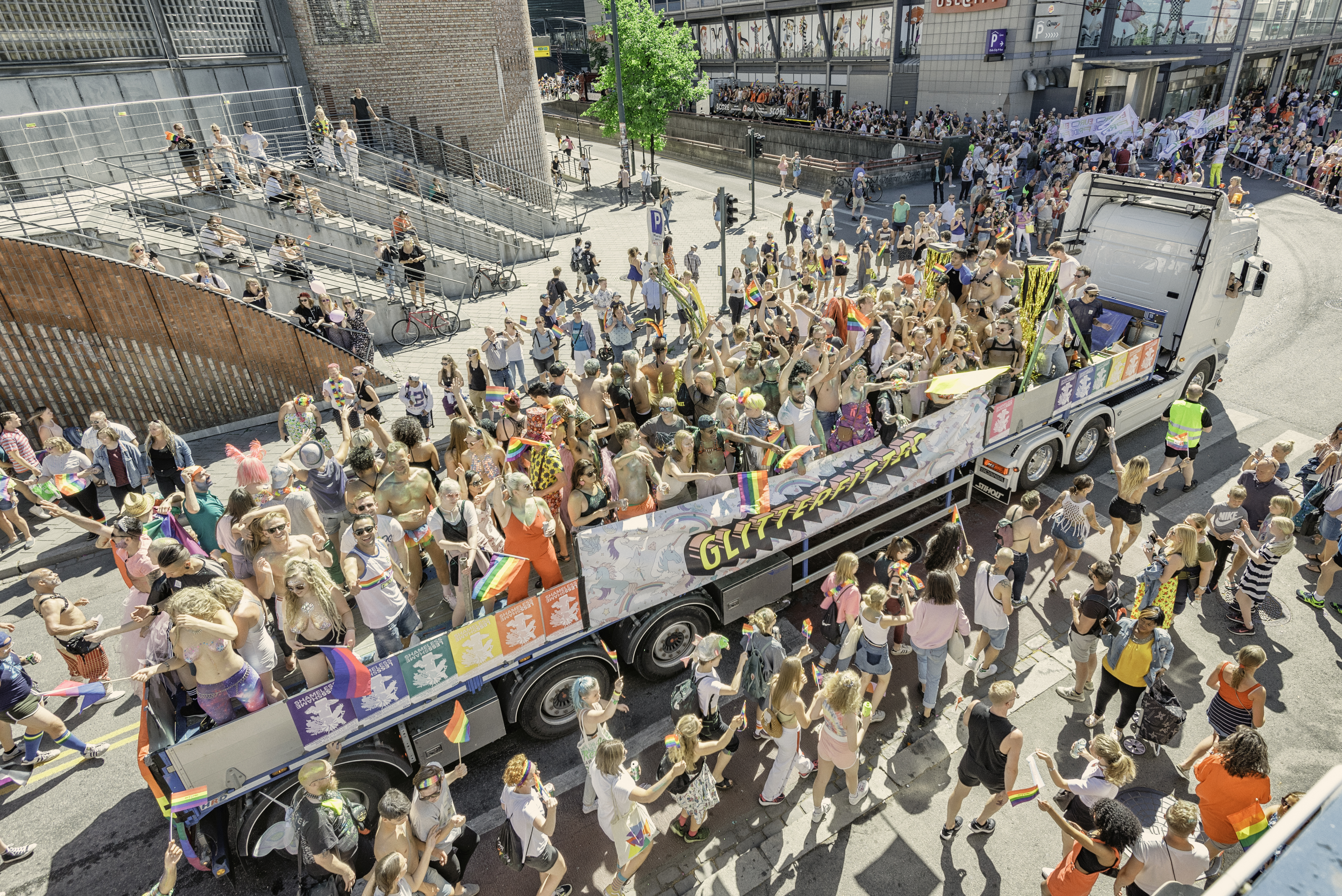
Participants at the 2019 Oslo Pride parade

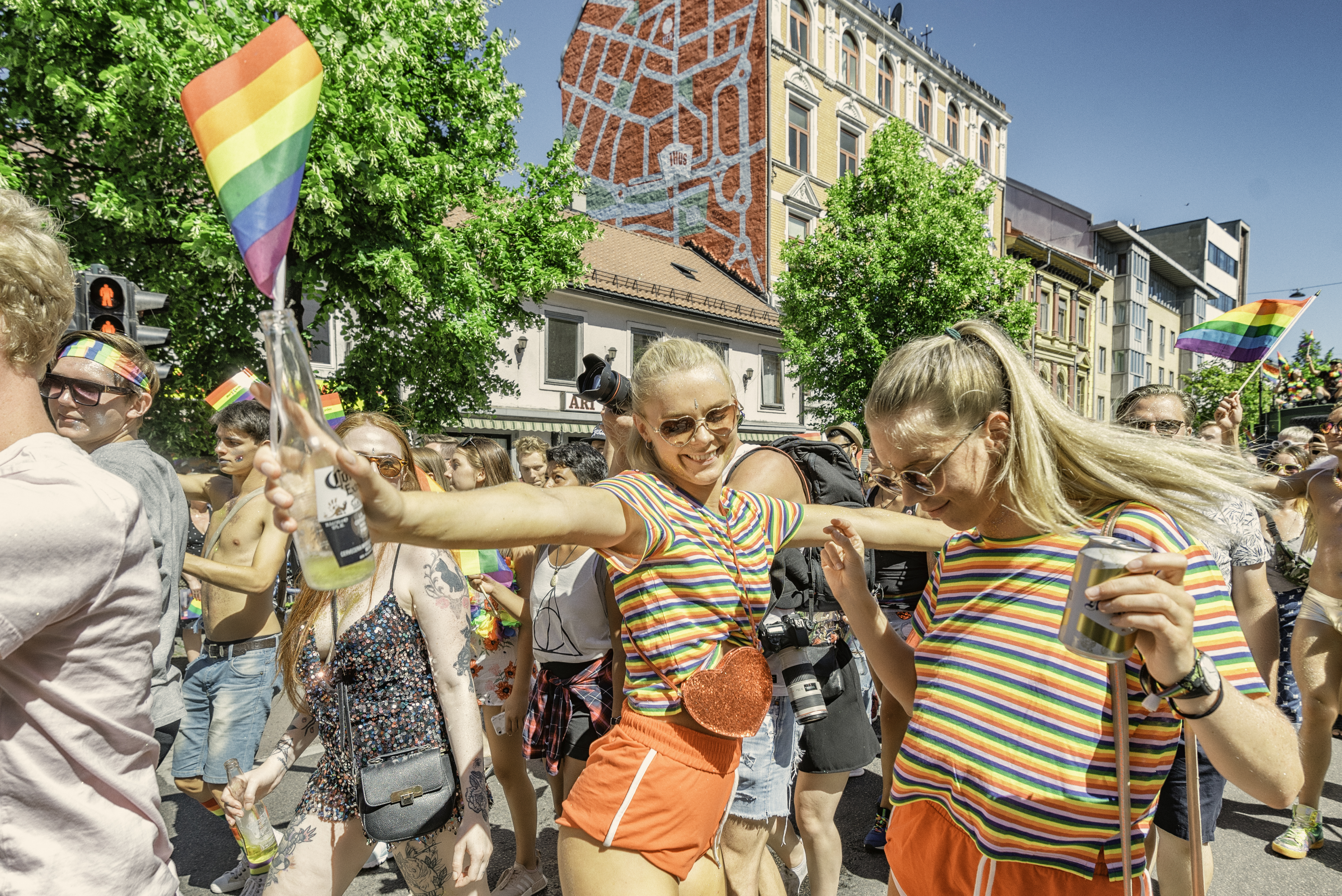
2019 Oslo Pride

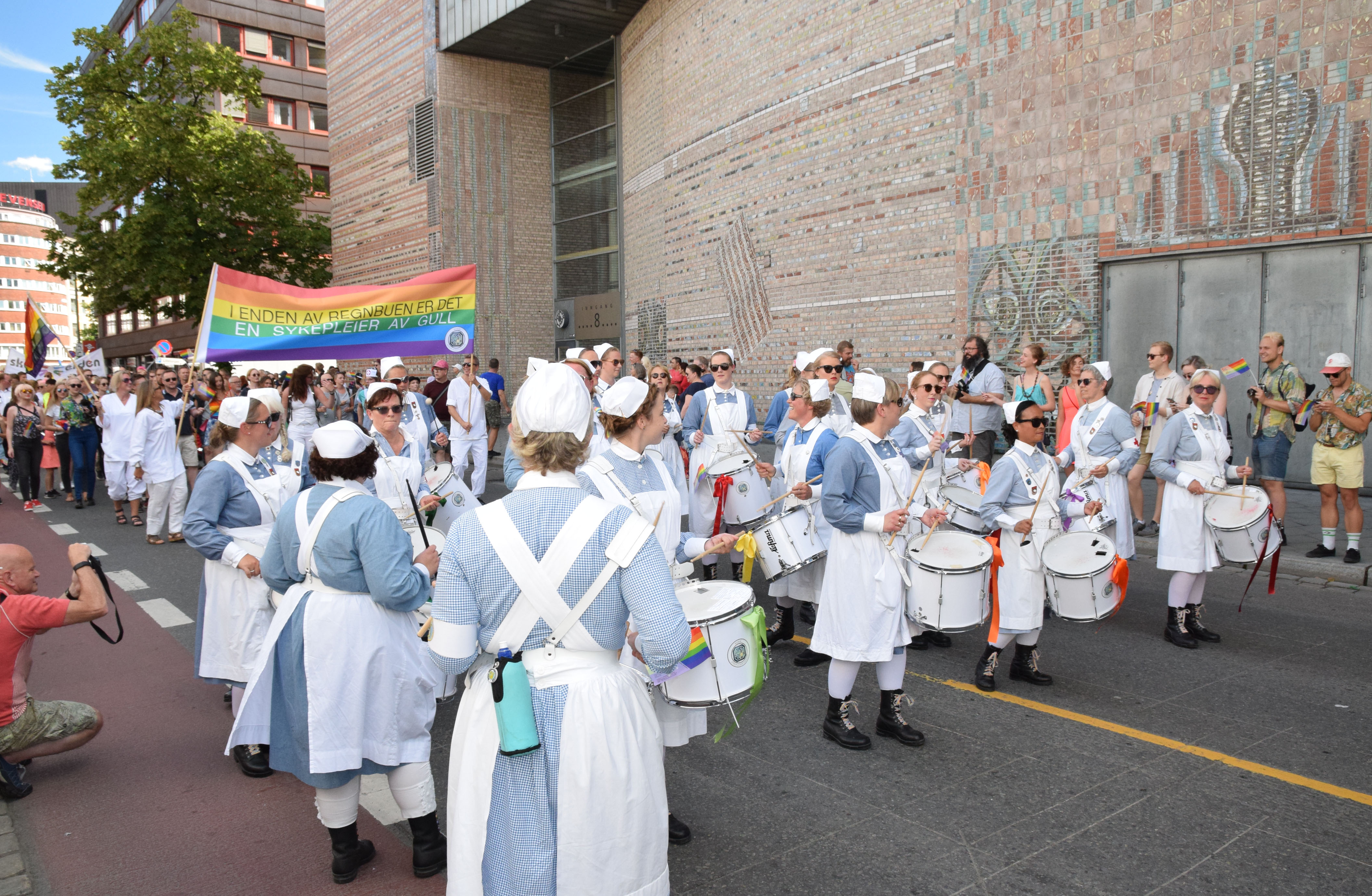
Participants at the 2016 Oslo Pride parade wearing old nurse uniforms

Norway is considered very gay-friendly. The most open and inclusive community can be found in the capital, Oslo, where many gay-friendly events and venues are located including the Raballder Sports Cup and the Oslo Pride Festival. Other events include the Scandinavian Ski Pride held in Hemsedal, Trondheim Pride held in Trondheim and Bergen Pride (Regnbuedagene) in Bergen. 45,000 people participated in the 2019 edition of Oslo Pride, and a further 250,000 attended and watched the event, according to the organisers. Several LGBT associations exist throughout the country, including the Association for Gender and Sexuality Diversity (Foreningen for kjønns- og seksualitetsmangfold), established in 1950 as the first gay organisation in Norway, Queer Youth (Skeiv Ungdom), Gay & Lesbian Health Norway, the Centre for Equality (Likestillingssenteret) and the Transgender Association (Forbundet for Transpersoner), among others. These groups variously offer helplines and counselling to LGBT youth, promote health and HIV prevention and advocate for the legal rights of same-sex couples and transgender individuals. In the far north of Norway, Sápmi Pride is held annually, changing locations between Finland, Sweden and Norway every year. In March 2019, Norway was named the fourth best LGBT-friendly travel destination in the world, tied with Denmark, Iceland and Finland.

The legal situation for same-sex couples is among the best in the world. Norway was the second country, after neighbouring Denmark, to offer registered partnerships to couples with many of the rights of marriage. In 2009, Norway became the sixth country in the world to legalise same-sex marriage, after the Netherlands, Belgium, Spain, Canada and South Africa. Legislation concerning adoption, gender changes for transgender people and anti-discrimination have all been amended in the past decades to include and apply to LGBT people and couples.

In 2015, media reported that there were calls to have a taxi station moved from near the entrance to Oslo's oldest gay pub. Several Muslims claimed that pictures had been taken of them entering the pub by taxi drivers parked at the station; some of these pictures were later distributed widely within Muslim communities.

On 1 September 2016, King Harald V of Norway delivered an impassioned speech in favour of LGBT rights. By 7 September, his speech had received nearly 80,000 likes on Facebook and viewed more than three million times. A part of his speech read as follows:

Norwegians are girls who love girls, boys who love boys, and boys and girls who love each other.

In July 2020, the Norwegian government announced that it would give LGBT refugees, alongside vulnerable women and children, priority. The rules only apply for the transfer of refugees from one asylum country to another for permanent resettlement.

== Public opinion ==
Five separate polls conducted by Gallup Europe, Sentio, Synovate MMI, Norstat and YouGov in the 2000s and 2010s showed increasing support for gender-neutral marriage laws over the period. These polls concluded that of the Norwegian population, the following percentages were supportive in the years shown: 61 percent in 2003; 63 percent in 2005; 66 percent in 2007; 58 percent in 2008; 70 percent in 2012; and 78 percent in 2013.

In May 2015, PlanetRomeo, an LGBT social network, published its first Gay Happiness Index (GHI). Gay men from over 120 countries were asked about how they feel about society's view on homosexuality, how do they experience the way they are treated by other people and how satisfied are they with their lives. Norway was ranked second, just above Denmark and below Iceland, with a GHI score of 77.

The Norwegian Directorate for Children, Youth and Family Affairs (Bufdir) found that the proportion of people with hostile attitudes towards LGBT+ people has been steadily decreasing: In 2017, 7.8 percent expressed hostile attitudes towards gay people while 11 percent expressed hostile attitudes towards transgender people.

=== Transphobia ===
2021 saw the formation of anti-transgender groups such as Kvinneaktivistene and a Norwegian branch of Women's Declaration International (formerly WHRC). Previously, the Women's Group Ottar has faced criticism for promoting anti-transgender sentiment.

Due to rising levels of transphobia in Norway, promoted in the name of radical feminism, 2476 feminists called for an inclusive feminism in a 2020 open letter. In 2023, 2611 feminists, including Norway's minister of equality, called for a reckoning with transphobia, stating that "for a long time, trans women who speak out publicly have been subjected to harassment and abuse, often by those who misuse lesbian identity and feminism to justify their transphobia." Alberte Bekkhus, the leader of the Red Youth, criticized the radical feminist organizations for transphobia, and said "if the women's movement allows transphobes in disguise as feminists, at the expense of trans women, it is working against its own cause." The leader of the Workers' Youth League, Astrid Hoem, emphasized that the left must take responsibility and confront transphobia within their ranks. The Norwegian Humanist Association has highlighted the "alarming unifying force of the increasing hatred and radicalization directed at transgender people" and promoted by self-identified radical feminists.

The Extremism Commission's report cited sources that pointed to "the connections between radical feminism and Christian conservatism" in relation to anti-trans activism, noting that "these are groups and individuals who use violent and dehumanizing language and are also threatening and extremely active." Feminist scholars have described these anti-gender movements operating in the name of radical feminism in the Norwegian context as part of a "complex threat to democracy." In 2023 the University of Bergen's Centre for Women's and Gender Research hosted its annual debate on international women's day, that focused on the anti-gender movements, where panelists highlighted how anti-gender actors had managed to become anchored in the radical feminist milieu in Oslo, including the radical feminist 8 March Committee.

In his speech on the anniversary of the 2011 Norway attacks, Prime Minister Jonas Gahr Støre said that "we know that queer people are the targets of hate, threats and violence. The incitement of hate is especially virulent against trans people. We will not accept this in Norway. We will use the memory of 22 July, in respect for those we lost, to turn our backs on this hate."

In the 2020s some tabloid newspapers have been criticized for regularly publishing transphobic content; for example journalism expert Jon Martin Larsen has criticized the newspaper Klassekampen for contributing to "incitement and hatred against transgender people."

== Summary table ==
| Same-sex sexual activity legal | Yes (Since 1972) |
| Equal age of consent (16) | Yes (Norway has never had a separate age of consent for homosexual acts.) |
| Anti-discrimination laws in employment | Yes (Since 1998) |
| Anti-discrimination laws in the provision of goods and services | Yes (Since 1981) |
| Anti-discrimination laws in all other areas (incl. indirect discrimination, hate speech) | Yes (Since 1981) |
| Anti-discrimination laws concerning gender identity | Yes (Since 2013) |
| Same-sex marriages | Yes (Since 2009) |
| Same-sex civil unions | No |
| Recognition of same-sex couples | Yes (Since 1993) |
| Stepchild adoption by same-sex couples | Yes (Since 2002) |
| Joint adoption by same-sex couples | Yes (Since 2009) |
| LGBT people allowed to serve openly in the military | Yes (Since 1979) |
| Right to change legal sex | Yes (Since 2016) |
| Legal recognition of non-binary gender | No |
| Gender self-identification | Yes (Since 2016) |
| Conversion therapy outlawed | Yes (Since 2024) |
| Access to IVF for lesbian couples and automatic parenthood for both spouses after birth | Yes (Since 2009) |
| Commercial surrogacy for gay male couples | No (Banned regardless of gender or sexual orientation) |
| MSMs allowed to donate blood | Yes / No (MSM deferred for 12 months after having sex with a new partner) |

== See also ==
- Criminalization of homosexuality
- Gaysir
- LGBT rights in Europe
- National Association for Lesbians, Gays, Bisexuals and Transgender People – LGBT rights organisation
- Politics of Norway
- Same-sex marriage in Norway
