= Gaysir =

Norwegian queer website

- Website type: website
- Available in: Norwegian
- Owner: Gaysir AS
- Website: http://www.gaysir.no
- Launched: September 22, 2000

Gaysir is a Norwegian website, aimed mainly at gay, bisexual and trans people. Gaysir was one of Norway's first web communities, and, in 2007, had approximately 50 000 unique visitors per week.

The website is owned and run by the private aksjeselskap Gaysir AS. Among the board of directors are the Oslo-politician Håkon Haugli (Oslo bystyre), who is the leader of the Norwegian Gay and Lesbian Social Democrats (GALSD) in Arbeiderpartiet.

Gaysir was given the Æresprisen (en. Award of Honor) from Oslo LLH during the annual event Skeive dager in central Oslo in 2006. The reason given was that the website had made a safe and inclusive network for gays and lesbians, and contributed to gay identity building.

The website is highly moderated, strict rules on what kind of pictures are allowed as profile pictures and gallery pictures are enforced by constantly monitoring the uploaded pictures. Although the definition of allowed pictures is often vague and subject to personal opinion of the moderator. The website also deletes the accounts of the users who make agreements for paid sex when reported without warning. The website also has been the subject of several controversies.

== History ==
The first version of Gaysir was launched on September 22, 2000. Version nine was launched in late winter 2007. Gaysir became Norway's dominating website for gays after the web community Radiator, run by Helseutvalget for homofile, was shut down in 2002. While Radiator's active users were mainly women, the main group of Gaysir's active users were men.

=== Power elite selection (Makttoppen) ===
On January 12 and 13, 2006 the Gaysir the editorial office of Gaysir selected the power elite among openly gays and lesbians in Norway. The winner was the chairman of the city council of Oslo, Erling Lae and the handball player Gro Hammerseng.

The power elite (no. Makttoppen) was also selected by the website in 2007, also then with Erling Lae topping the selection – this time accompanied by the then newly employed chief editor of Dagbladet, Anne Aasheim.

=== Controversies ===
Prayer and Action Against the Selected Power Elite (2006): The power elite selection in 2006 received a lot of attention. Jan-Aage Torp, a Norwegian pastor in the Pentecostal congregation Oslokirken, said to the Christian newspaper Norge IDAG that he recommended Christians to use the selections (Makttoppen) as a target for prayer to get the people in the selection removed from their professions. This call for a prayer campaign received attention from a number of media sources, including Dagbladet.

Trondheim municipality's webportal (2007): In July 2007 there was a conflict with Trondheim municipality's external links policy and Gaysir's pornographic ads. It was questioned whether the municipality's website was to link to the website for a local gay arrangement, HomoUKA. This website again linked to Gaysir and Blikk (monthly newspaper for gays, lesbians and bisexuals). Trondheim municipality said they did not want to expose a link that lead to pages that could be offensive. The deputy mayor of Trondheim, Knut Fagerbakke (SV), arranged it so that the link was put back up. He said it was the website administrator who had removed the link in the first place, no politicians were involved, but when people were offended by the removal of the link, and HomoUKA requested the link back up, they put it back up.

About recommendations to the National Agency for Education (2007): Oslo Town Council adopted an action plan in 2006, against discrimination of gays, lesbians and bisexuals, with a recommendation that Gaysir and Blikk should be available for Gymnasium students. Karita Bekkemellem, who was the minister of Children and Equality Affairs on November 10, 2007, sent a letter to 13 big municipalities, where they were encouraged to make similar action plans as Oslo. In the letter, she mentioned Blikk Nett and Gaysir as current resource pages.

The recommendation came after the conflict with the pornographic ads had been an issue in Trondheim. The letter started a chain of protests, first from the organisation Nordisk nettverk for ekteskapet (en. Nordic network for marriage), and politicians from FrP and KrF distanced themselves from the recommendation. Gaysir, at that point, still had advertisers with webshops that showed hard core pornography pictures on film covers that were for sale on DVD and VHS. These film covers were visible with no censorship or login restrictions, and were described by Nordisk nettverk for ekteskapet and in a number of newspapers (Dagen, Magazinet, Norge idag, Vårt Land, Nettavisen) in various detail. It was also referred to several examples from the advertiser's websites, such as somewhat rude titles on some of the films that were offered for sale, and a sex club where one could read messages with very direct descriptions. On October 18, 2007, Manuela Ramin-Osmundsen replaced Bekkemellem as the minister of Children and Equality Affairs, and FrP expressed that Ramin-Osmundsen should retract the recommendation if the ads were not removed from the website.

While ads show hardcore pornographic pictures, the users are not allowed to upload pictures with sexual content as profile pictures and pictures showing hardcore sexual activity in the picture gallery.

From November 22, 2007, Gaysir adjusted the display rules of the ads, so they would only be visible for registered members.

== Services ==
Gaysir has, since the start, taken aim on offering daily updated news. The website has per November 2007, over 6000 articles in their archive.

=== Gaysir Interactive ===
Gaysir Interaktiv (en. Interactive) is the web community part of Gaysir. The users creates profiles and can send messages, pictures and emoticons to other users. The members can also write blogs and create photo galleries. The age limit for being a member is the same as the age of consent in Norway, 16 years old.

With its 35 000 medlemmer per November 2007, Gaysir Interaktiv is a central meeting ground for the Norwegian gay community. The gender division among the users is 30% women and 70% men.

Paid plus memberships were introduced to the users of Gaysir Interaktiv in 2002. Gaysir Interaktiv is available for non-paying members of the web community, but the free version does not have access to WAP, no access to other user's photo galleries, and instead of some features, they get ads for the paid plus membership.

=== Calendar and nightlife guide ===
Gaysir has an activity calendar with information about activities for gays across the nation, where party arrangers, drinking establishments and volunteer organizations are listed. There is also a nightlife guide with all the regular meeting places for gays across the nation.

== See also ==
- Homosocialization
- National Association for Lesbians, Gays, Bisexuals and Transgender People
- LGBT rights in Norway
