= Mohyeldeen Mohammad =

Iraqi-Norwegian activist

Mohyeldeen Mohammad (born 1986) is an Iraqi-Norwegian Islamist; he is also a political activist associated with the fundamentalist Profetens Ummah group. He became a controversial figure in Norway after stating that the country is at war with Muslims and warning the Norwegian people with an 11 September happening on Norwegian soil. Since then, his media profile has risen following a series of statements regarding Norway, homosexuality and Islamism. He was formerly a Sharia student at the Islamic University of Madinah in Saudi Arabia, until he was deported from the country in 2011.

== Early life and education ==
With a family background from Iraq, Mohammad was born in Manchester, England in 1986. His family migrated to Norway in 1989, and Mohammad settled with his family in Larvik. In September 2006, he legally changed his name to "Giovanni", the Italian equivalent to English "John" but claimed to mean "God is gracious". For unknown reasons, he reverted to his original name in January 2007. Mohammad started studying Islamic Sharia law at the Islamic University of Madinah in Saudi Arabia in September 2009. In March 2010, he was expelled from the university for being considered "politically active." Mohammad however appealed the verdict, and was allowed to continue studying at the university.

Upon Mohammad's arrival in Medina on 8 September 2011, he was arrested by Saudi authorities. According to Saudi police, his arrest came as a result of "information" from Norwegian authorities, although it was not clear what his charges were. He returned to Norway on 12 September 2011.

== "Profetens Ummah" and later life ==
=== Muhammad cartoon demonstration ===
Mohammad became noted in the Norwegian public after holding a speech during an illegal demonstration of 3,000 Muslims in Oslo on 12 February 2010, against the newspaper Dagbladet after it had printed a cartoon depicting Muhammad as a pig writing the Quran in the context of illustrating a link by a user the newspaper criticised on the Norwegian Police Security Service's Facebook page. In his speech Mohammad proclaimed: "When will the Norwegian government and their media understand the serious matter of this? Perhaps not before it's too late. Perhaps not before we get an 11 September on Norwegian soil. This is not a threat, but a warning."

His speech was condemned by the Islamic Council Norway, and reportedly by "a wide aspect" of the Norwegian Muslim community.

A demonstration of Muslims against Mohammad's comments resulted in nine people showing up, some of whom held posters protesting the publication of the cartoon.

=== The Syrian civil war ===
Mohammad traveled to Syria in 2012, to participate in the Syrian civil war. Although it did not become known publicly until October that year, when he posted a series of photographs on-line, with himself posing alongside armed jihadists. One month later, he posted a video on the YouTube-website, where he, armed with automatic weapons warned Norwegian authorities against "spreading lies". Authorities speculated that he was a part of at least 30 Norwegian Islamists volunteering in the war. Upon returning to Norway sometime during the winter of 2012, he continued being active in raising funds for the Islamist rebels, alongside members of Profetens Ummah.

== Controversies ==
Mohammad responded to a question from the newspaper Klassekampen on 16 February 2009 about the stoning of a person in Somalia with: "As far as I know the person was homosexual, that was the punishment he deserved." The remarks caused furore, and the Norwegian National Association for Lesbian and Gay Liberation called it "probably the most extreme we have heard in this country for many years" and filed a formal complaint with the police, requesting that they investigate the incident.

On 5 November 2009, Mohammad stated on Facebook that infidels should be decapitated, and he also honored Osama bin Laden and other notable Islamists. After the death of four Norwegian soldiers in Afghanistan, Mohyeldeen posted a message on his Facebook saying: "Allahu Akbar! Norwegian terrorists killed in Afghanistan! Alhamdulillah, praise be to Allah, this will be celebrated!".

When Mullah Krekar allegedly threatened two Kurds who had burnt a Koran with death in April 2010, Mohammad referred to it as "our uncle's Fatwā."

On 10 September 2011, Klassekampen reported that Mohammad had published a video on YouTube, in which he fires an air rifle and shouts "Allahu Akbar!". The video was titled "Jihad Norge" (Jihad Norway).

== Legal issues ==
On 17 February 2010, Mohammad was arrested and briefly detained by police in connection with alleged threats against journalists from the daily Dagbladet. He was questioned and formally charged before being released.

Approximately 18 months after being deported from Saudi Arabia, he travelled to Tunisia, and was arrested by Tunisian security police at the airport in the capital Tunis, and after a three-hour interrogation, he was again deported.

Mohammad was arrested by the Norwegian Police Security Service (PST) on 1 February 2012. The background was a hate video published on YouTube, in connection with an Islamist demonstration outside the Norwegian Parliament two weeks earlier, in which Mohammad participated together with Arfan Qadeer Bhatti. Mohammad and another 21-year-old Islamist were released on 3 February, although they were still under investigation.

He was again arrested by heavily armed security police in May 2013, on suspicion of carrying a gun. He was later fined and released after signing a written promise to stay away from the capital Oslo during the Norwegian Constitution Day celebrations. After failing to pay the fine of NOK 12.000, the case subsequently went to court.

On 21 August 2014, Mohammad along with Ubaydullah Hussain was named in a criminal complaint filed to the police prosecutor in Oslo by The Iraqi Society in Norway, an organisation representing Iraqis in Norway. The complaint was filed after Mohammad, on social media had praised the beheading of American journalist James Foley.

In 2019, the Supreme Court sentenced him to 2 years and 6 months in prison.

== Personal life ==
Mohammad has not been registered with an occupation in Norway since mid-2009. He married his first wife in the spring of 2011, but the marriage ended in separation after three months.
