= Nina Johnsrud =

Norwegian journalist (born 1959)

Nina Johnsrud (born 16 February 1959) is a Norwegian journalist who works as a crime reporter for the Oslo newspaper Dagsavisen. She was awarded the Fritt Ord Honorary Award for courageous journalism in 2012.

== Education and early career ==
Johnsrud studied Spanish at the University of Oslo and was then educated at Norsk journalisthøgskole (English: Norwegian Journalist College), now part of Oslo and Akershus University College. She has worked for the Lindesnes, Bergens Arbeiderblad, VG, Østlandets Blad and Klassekampen before starting as a journalist in Dagsavisen. She has also taught at Norsk journalisthøgskole.

== Career in Dagsavisen ==
Johnsrud started working in Dagsavisen in 1985. One of her interests was immigrants and minorities in Norway. She became involved in reporting on crime when she covered the conflict between the Young Guns and B-gjengen (English: The B-gang) gangs after a man was killed at Tøyen in 2001.

In July 2006, fours shots were fired at her house in Oppegård outside Oslo during the night. Three shots went through a window and one shot hit the front door. Johnsrud was sleeping in a tent at the time in the garden with her son. One source thought that the shooting was due to Johnsrud covering election fraud in the Oslo municipal elections by Yogaraja Balasingham.

Johnsrud was convinced that the shots related to her work as a crime journalist. In a commentary shortly after the incident, Aftenposten wrote that if Johnsrud had been targeted for her journalistic work, it "represented a grim new era in Norwegian journalism". Arfan Bhatti was charged for the shooting, but the charges were dropped in August 2007. The case has never been solved. Bhatti was later found guilty of shooting at a Jewish synagogue in 2006.

On 12 October 2012, Johnsrud wrote an article in Dagsavisen about Islamists associated with the Profetens Ummah group attending a course for prospective hunters. Passing the exam for hunters would make the persons in a position to apply for gun licences. The Islamists were reported to have expressed extreme views during the course. The leader of the course had reported the situation to the Norwegian Police Security Service. Ubaydullah Hussain, who was spokesperson for the Profetens Ummah, was interviewed in the article. Shortly after the article was published, Johnsrud received an email from Hussian which she perceived as threatening. The email stated that several persons were disappointed and it said "you should not be surprised if something or someone turn up in your life as well. With words or action, that I don't know". On 25 October 2012, Hussain was arrested and charged with threats against Johnsrud and another journalist. He was released after 53 days.

After the arrest, Johnsrud came forward as one of two journalists who had received threats. She called for increased focus on extremist groups. Editor Kaia Storvik in Dagsavisen decided to remove Johnsrud from covering Profetens Ummah and related subjects. Johnsrud publicly criticised the newspaper for this decision.

In November 2012, she was awarded the Fritt Ord Honorary Award for courageous journalism and defending free speech.

Ubaydullah Hussain was convicted for threats against Johnsrud in February 2014 in Oslo District Court. For this and some other criminal offenses, he was sentenced to 120 days in prison, of which 60 days was suspended. Hussain did not immediately indicate whether he would appeal the sentence.

Johnsrud participated in establishing the SKUP foundation for investigating journalism in 1990.
