= Hallgrim Berg =

Norwegian politician

Member of the Norwegian Parliament
- In office 13 January 1982 – 30 September 1997
- Constituency: Buskerud

Personal details
- Born: 28 January 1945 (age 81) Ål, Buskerud, Norway
- Party: Conservative Party
- Occupation: Author; musician; politician

Hallgrim Berg (born 28 January 1945) is a Norwegian author, traditional folk musician, and former politician for the Conservative Party. He was a member of the Norwegian Parliament from 1982 to 1997, representing Buskerud. He has released several books and been involved in several musical albums, and held numerous public positions.

== Biography ==
Berg was born in Ål. He became cand.philol. majoring in history from the University of Oslo in 1972. After being a lecturer at Geilo and Gol, he was self-employed in Geilo from 1974 to 1986.

He was a deputy representative to the Norwegian Parliament from 1977 to 1985, began meeting regularly from 1982 for Minister of Justice Mona Røkke, and was then elected as a regular representative for three terms from 1985 to 1997, before again becoming a deputy representative from 1997 to 2001. He served as a delegate to the United Nations General Assembly from 1986 to 1989, and as a member of the Parliamentary Assembly of the Council of Europe (PACE) from 1989 to 1997, until 1993 as deputy leader. He was also a member of the Ål municipal council from 1975 to 1987, and again from 1999 to 2003, and of the Buskerud county council from 1999 to 2007.

In 2007 he released his book Amerikabrevet: Europa i fare, translated to English and published in the United States as Letter to Lady Liberty: Europe in Danger, about what he called "the Muslim invasion of Europe". The book was later noted to have cited counter-jihad blogger Fjordman as an "authoritative source", although only once in the context of his collection of the writings of Bat Ye'or. Berg has endorsed Ye'or's Eurabia thesis, and has been described as "the most prominent Eurabia author in Norway" by social anthropologist Sindre Bangstad. In 2013 he released a follow-up book titled Demokrati eller islamisme. Europa under islam where he continues to warn against Muslim immigration.

In her 2004 book The Force of Reason, Eurabia-author Oriana Fallaci says there is "only one hero", namely Berg who was praised over four pages for speaking out against a report on Islamic relations in the Parliamentary Assembly of the Council of Europe (PACE) in Strasbourg in 1991.

Berg has been active in the pro-Israel organisation With Israel for Peace.

== Bibliography ==
- 2016 – Parlamenturismen. Norske folkevalde på utflukt. Samlaget.
- 2013 – Demokrati eller islamisme. Europa under islam? Genesis.
- 2010 – Når flaumen går. Samlaget.
- 2009 – Rakfisk i godt lag. Samlaget.
- 2009 – Olav Thon - Billionaire in a Parka. North American Heritage Press.
- 2008 – Olav Thon - milliardær i anorakk. Kagge Forlag.
- 2007 – Amerikabrevet: Europa i fare. Koloritt forlag.
- 2007 – Letter to Lady Liberty: Europe in Danger. Koloritt forlag.
- 2006 – Når lauvet sprett. Samlaget.
- 2005 – Me og uss, de og dikko - dialekt i Ål og Torpo, redaktør.
- 2004 – Når sevja stig. Samlaget.

== Discography ==
- 2010 – Sogesvall - hermur, humor og buskspel. Hallgrim Berg og Knut Buen. Buen Kulturverkstad, NYCD 16.
- 2010 – Sputer og drev – munnharpe i 100. Hallgrim Berg og Erik Røine. Grappa Musikkforlag, HCD 7254.
- 2008 – Amerikabrevet: Europa i fare. Norsk Lyd- og Blindeskriftbibliotek.
- 2006 – Når lauvet sprett. Lydbokforlaget.
- 2006 – Fille-Vern - gamle og nye mestre i norsk munnharpetradisjon. NRK/Ta:lik TA29CD.
- 2004 – Når sevja stig. Lydbokforlaget.
- 2002 – 4th International Jew's Harp festival. Heilo HCD 7189.
- 2001 – I føykje og snjor. European Snowcross Championship/Hylestad Snøscooterklubb.
- 1999 – Drammensviser. Moberg Media.
- 1999 – Munnharpa - Hallgrim Berg og Erik Røine. Heilo HCD 7149.
- 1998 – Zotora: Emigrate - didjeridoo, Jew's harp and willow flutes.
- 1997 – Seljefløyta - Berg, Jacobsen, Ofsdal. Heilo HCD 7131.
- 1997 – Ari Thunda presents: Hal Berg/Licensed to dance. MNW Records, MNWCD 322.
