= With Israel for Peace =

Norwegian pro-Israel organisation

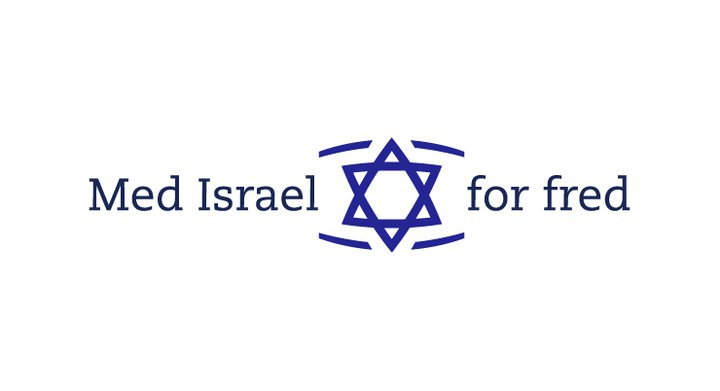
Logo of MIFF.

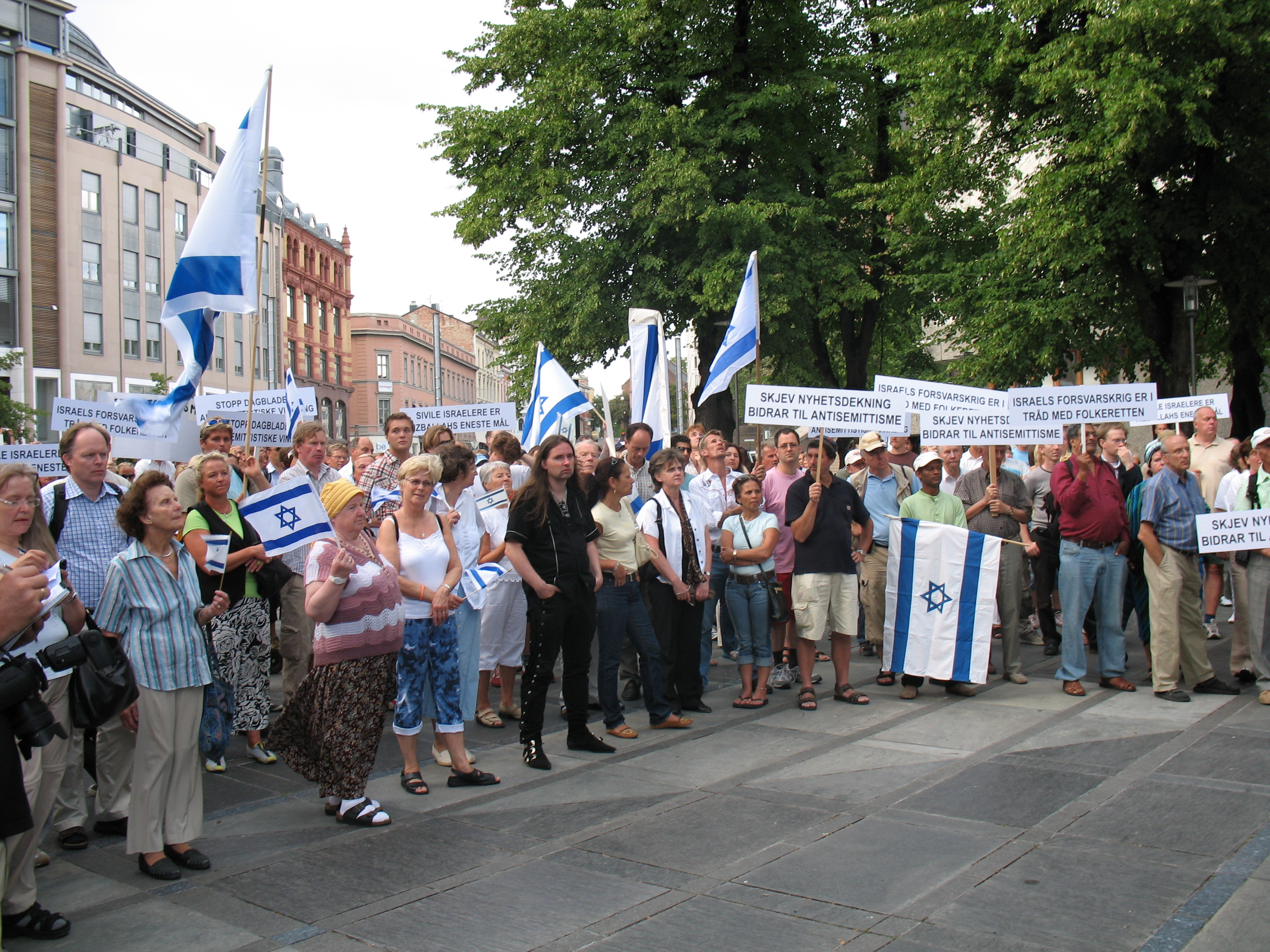
MIFF-rally in Oslo in 2006.

With Israel for Peace (Norwegian: Med Israel for fred, MIFF) is a Norwegian pro-Israel organisation. It styles itself as a "non-religious, non-partisan pro-Israel organisation", and has 14,000 registered members as of 2024. A main concern of the organisation is what it sees as a negative bias towards Israel in mainstream Norwegian media coverage. The director of the organisation is Conrad Myrland, and the president is Lars Johan Nordgård.

== History and activities ==
MIFF was founded in 1978. Since then it has grown substantially from about 700–800 in its early years, to 2,000 around 2008, and 10,700 as of 2018. In January 2009, during the First Gaza War, a peaceful rally by MIFF was attacked amid violent anti-Israel riots in Oslo. By early 2014 MIFF had more than twice as many members as the main pro-Palestine organisation in Norway, the Palestine Committee of Norway.

In July 2014, amid the 2014 Gaza War, the organisation accused Mads Gilbert of lying about Israel, and put ads in Norwegian newspapers debunking claims made by Gilbert. The organisation was itself accused of stirring up television viewer storms against NRK reporter Sidsel Wold and TV 2 reporter Fredrik Græsvik. In August 2014 MIFF held a rally with up to 600 people in Oslo, with speakers including members of parliament Hans Fredrik Grøvan and Kristian Norheim. The organisation received a record 900.000 kr in gifts and membership fees during the month of August 2014. Notable members of MIFF includes retired football player Anders Rambekk, member of parliament Erlend Wiborg, and former member of parliament Hallgrim Berg.

In 2015, MIFF became a co-founding member of the European Alliance for Israel, planned since 2013, which included delegates from fifteen European countries, of which MIFF was the largest group by membership.

A week after the October 7 attacks in 2023, about 500 people attended a rally in Oslo arranged by MIFF. Among the speakers were politicians such as Progress Party leader Sylvi Listhaug.
