= The End of Sykes-Picot =

- Banner ad for The End of Sykes-Picot
- نهاية سايكس بيكو
- Produced by: Al-Hayat Media Center
- Release date: 29 June 2014
- Running time: 15 minutes
- Language: English

The End of Sykes-Picot (Arabic: نهاية سايكس بيكو, romanized: Nihāyat Sāyiks Bīkū) is a video produced by Al-Hayat Media Center that was filmed on the border of Iraq and Syria about ending the Sykes–Picot Agreement during the expansion of the Islamic State.

The video was released on June 29, 2014. It is around 15 minutes long and is entirely in the English language.

== Video ==
The video focuses on the Islamic State member Bastian Vasquez (under the alias of Abu Safiyya), who commentates on the Islamic State's ideology regarding the borders established via the Sykes–Picot Agreement. The video starts at the Commando Battalions Border in Iraq, near the Syrian border, where he says that the Islamic State vows to establish a caliphate with one Ummah against nationalism. He quotes Abu Bakr al-Baghdadi, saying that the Islamic State will be a "breaker of borders", particularly the borders of Iraq, Jordan, and Lebanon. He shows a map of the Iraqi border at an Iraqi base, and says that the flag of Iraq is shirk. He is shown raising the flag of the Islamic State on a flagpole, while saying the Islamic State will destroy what it calls shirk and kuffar.

He then shows vehicles destroyed in an assault by the Islamic State's Wilayah al-Barakah; he says they took the rest of the vehicles as ghanimah and killed most of the officers at the checkpoint. He shows a map depicting the border crossing from Iraq into Syria and vows to destroy it. In a later scene, he shows a collection of vehicles in Mosul that were taken from the Iraqi border patrol. He says the border patrol was funded by the United States, and they would continue taking from the United States.

Afterwards, he shows a prison with prisoners of war, whom he calls murtaddeen, and people of other religions, including Shia Muslims and Yazidis, who he claims "worship shaitan". Vasquez shows a police station, which Islamic State members prepare to destroy with explosives; the explosion is later shown. The video ends with an English-speaking man in a police vehicle taken from Iraqi police, who taunts then-President of the United States Barack Obama about United States soldiers being in Baghdad. They call the border "taghut" and call for a Jihad against it, saying such action is a necessary step for the restoration of "the promised caliphate".
