= Anders Cameroon Østensvig Dale =

Norwegian terrorist

- Born: 19 October 1978 (age 48)
- Other names: Muslim Abu Abdurrahman, Abu Abdurrahman the Norwegian
- Allegiance: Al-Qaeda in the Arabian Peninsula

Anders Cameroon Østensvig Dale (born 19 October 1978), also known as Muslim Abu Abdurrahman and Abu Abdurrahman the Norwegian, is a Norwegian Yemen-based terrorist associated with Al-Qaeda in the Arabian Peninsula (AQAP). As of Q1 2026, he is allegedly in prison (or detention) in Yemen. The foreign ministry (Norway) is refusing (as of 2023) to help him get to Norway.

Previously, after being wanted internationally since 2012, Dale was in 2014 listed as a Specially Designated Global Terrorist by the United States Department of State, and blacklisted by the United Nations Security Council.

== Early life ==
Born to Norwegian parents, Dale grew up in Nesodden. He was a member of the Green Party, and appeared as a low-level candidate on the party's election lists in Oslo for the 2007 municipal elections. He was reportedly a member of the left-wing radical Blitz movement in his youth, and described himself as an anarchist and Marxist.

Dale converted to Islam in 2008, and began attending the Rabita Mosque. The same year, he was interviewed in an NRK radio program as a Norwegian Muslim convert who criticised "media propaganda" portraying Muslims as being violent. His family contacted the police after he took part in the 2008–09 Oslo riots.

== Designated terrorist ==
Dale first travelled to Yemen to join Al-Qaeda in the Arabian Peninsula (AQAP) in 2008, and returned to Norway several times until December 2011. During his time in Yemen he is thought to have received bomb-making training by Ibrahim al-Asiri, specifically to make bomb-belts, improvised explosives and explosives used in car bombs. He broke off contacts with his pregnant wife, a Moroccan he married in 2010 following the last trip, and was reported missing by his family in April 2012.

Dale became wanted by the intelligence services of several countries in 2012, suspected of having planned a terrorist attack against the London 2012 Summer Olympics.

In July 2014, Dale was listed as a Specially Designated Global Terrorist by the United States Department of State. He was also charged under Norway's anti-terror laws by the Norwegian Police Security Service (PST), after having been under investigation for several years. It was reported later the same month that Dale was the reason for increased security measures being introduced on direct flights to the United States. In September 2014, he was blacklisted by the United Nations Security Council as one of eleven wanted terrorists requested to be blacklisted by the United States.

One of the perpetrators of the January 2015 Charlie Hebdo shooting, Saïd Kouachi, is considered likely to have met Dale as he trained with AQAP in Yemen in 2011.

Dale is arrested in Yemen since 2022, and has asked for help from Norwegian Foreign department to travel back to Norway.

== See also ==
- List of fugitives from justice who disappeared
