= Herr Nilsen Jazz Club =

Jazz club in Oslo, Norway

Coordinates: 59°54′55″N 10°44′26″E

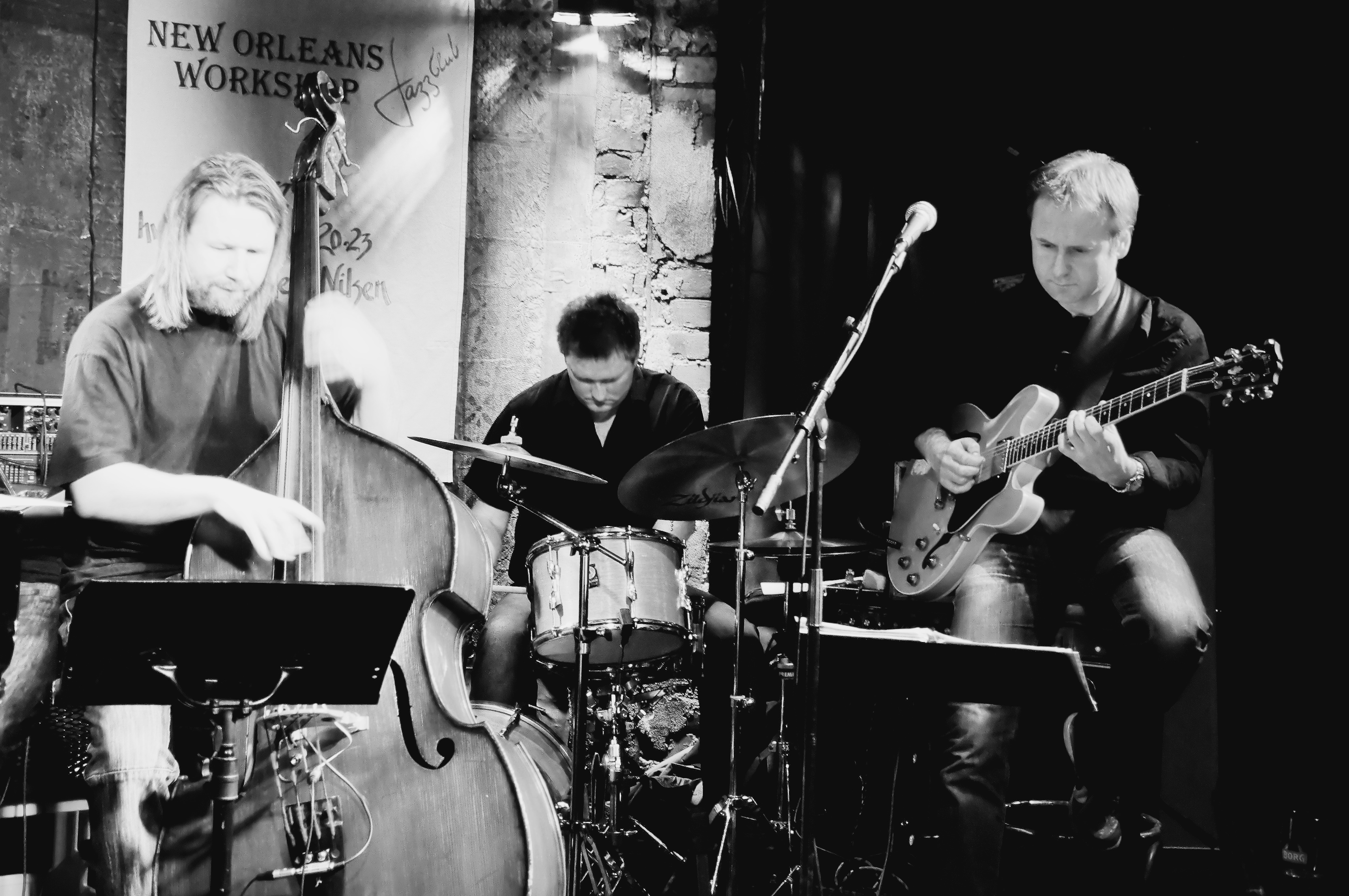
Herr Nilsen Jazz Club

Herr Nilsen Jazz Club is a jazz club in Oslo, Norway. It is located southeast of the Norwegian National Gallery, just metres north of the Hotel Bristol and Oslo Nye Teater, overlooking the courthouse square. Darwin Porter of Frommer's describes the club as "one of the most congenial spots in Oslo and a personal favorite." It often hosts internationally and nationally famous jazz musicians, with a focus on Dixieland jazz music of New Orleans.

The place organizes concerts in most genres, although in the beginning it was a purely jazz club. Oslo Jazzforum has held concerts in the venue since 1996. Østkanten Blues Club, New Orleans Workshop Jazz Club and Norwegian Americana Forum also have regular events here. For a period in the 2000s, Mr Nilsen was part of the project National jazz scene. The jazz club New Orleans has also had its base here. In 2015, Espen Nilsen, who runs the place, received the Ella award, the Oslo Jazz Festival's honorary award.

Mr. Nilsen started in 1993, and got his name from the initiator Espen Nilsen, who wanted to replace Club 7, which closed down in 1985.
