= Gender Recognition Act (California) =

2017 California transgender rights law

California State Legislature
- Long title: An act to amend, repeal, and add Sections 1277 and 1278 of, and to add Section 1277.5 to, the Code of Civil Procedure, to amend Sections 103426 and 103440 of, to amend the heading of Article 7 (commencing with Section 103425) of Chapter 11 of Part 1 of Division 102 of, and to amend, repeal, and add Sections 103425 and 103430 of, the Health and Safety Code, and to amend Section 13005 of, and to amend, repeal, and add Section 12800 of the Vehicle Code, relating to gender identity.
- Citation: Stats. 2017, c. 853
- Passed by: California State Senate
- Passed: 31 May 2017
- Passed by: California State Assembly
- Passed: 13 September 2017
- Signed by: Jerry Brown
- Signed: 15 October 2017
- Effective: 1 January 2018 (birth certificates); 1 September 2018 (court orders); 1 January 2019 (driver's licenses and identification cards)

Legislative history

Initiating chamber: California State Senate
- Bill title: Gender identity: female, male, or nonbinary
- Bill citation: Senate Bill 179 (2017–2018)
- Introduced by: Atkins, Wiener
- First reading: 24 January 2017
- Third reading: 31 May 2017
- Voting summary: 26 voted for; 12 voted against; 2 absent

Revising chamber: California State Assembly
- First reading: 1 June 2017
- Third reading: 13 September 2017
- Voting summary: 57 voted for; 21 voted against; 1 absent

Final stages
- California State Assembly amendments considered by the California State Senate: 14 September 2017
- Finally passed both chambers: 14 September 2017
- Status: Amended

The Gender Recognition Act (Senate Bill 179 or SB 179) is a California law providing for nonbinary gender markers on state-issued identification documents, and simplifying the judicial and administrative processes for name and gender changes. It was introduced by state senators Toni Atkins and Scott Wiener, and was signed into law by Jerry Brown on 15 October 2017.

It was the first state law in the United States allowing for a nonbinary gender marker on all state identification documents, including birth certificates. It also removed the previous requirement of a sworn physician statement attesting to medical treatment for those seeking court-ordered gender changes or administrative issuance of new birth certificates with a revised sex marker.
