= Global Equality Fund =

Public-private partnership

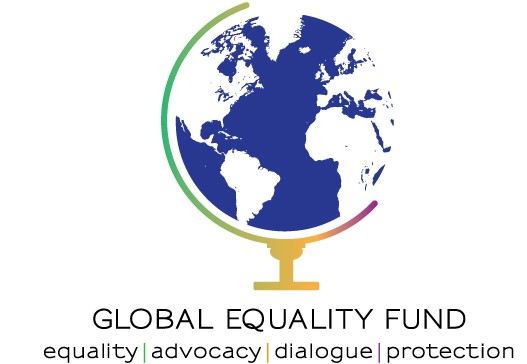
Global Equality Fund logo

The Global Equality Fund (GEF) is a leading public-private partnership of like-minded governments and private sector entities dedicated to protecting and defending the human rights and fundamental freedoms of lesbian, gay, bisexual, transgender, and intersex (LGBTI) persons around the world. Through the GEF, governments, companies, foundations, and NGOs work collaboratively to support local initiatives spearheaded by human rights defenders and civil society organizations working to affirm a consistent global message that LGBTI persons are entitled to the same human rights and fundamental freedoms as everyone, regardless of sexual orientation, gender identity or expression, or sex characteristics.

Current GEF Partners include: Argentina, Australia, Canada, Chile, Croatia, Denmark, Finland, France, Germany, Iceland, Italy, Montenegro, the Netherlands, Norway, Sweden, Uruguay, the Arcus Foundation, the John D. Evans Foundation, FRI: the Norwegian Organization for Sexual and Gender Diversity, the MAC AIDS Fund, Deloitte LLP, Royal Bank of Canada, Hilton, Bloomberg L.P., Marriott International, the Human Rights Campaign, and Out Leadership.

The GEF provides emergency assistance to individuals and organizations under threat or attack, small grants for short-term, high-impact projects, and long-term technical assistance grants that build the capacity of civil society organizations working to advance the human rights of LGBTI persons in over 90 countries worldwide.

Individuals and organizations supported through GEF grants can be found working toward:

- Protecting persons or groups against the threat of violence
- Advocating against discriminatory laws that criminalize LGBTI status
- Ending explicit and implicit forms of discrimination, in the workplace, housing, education, and other public institutions
- Building community awareness and support for the human rights of LGBTI persons
