= Gender Recognition Act (Norway) =

2016 Norwegian law

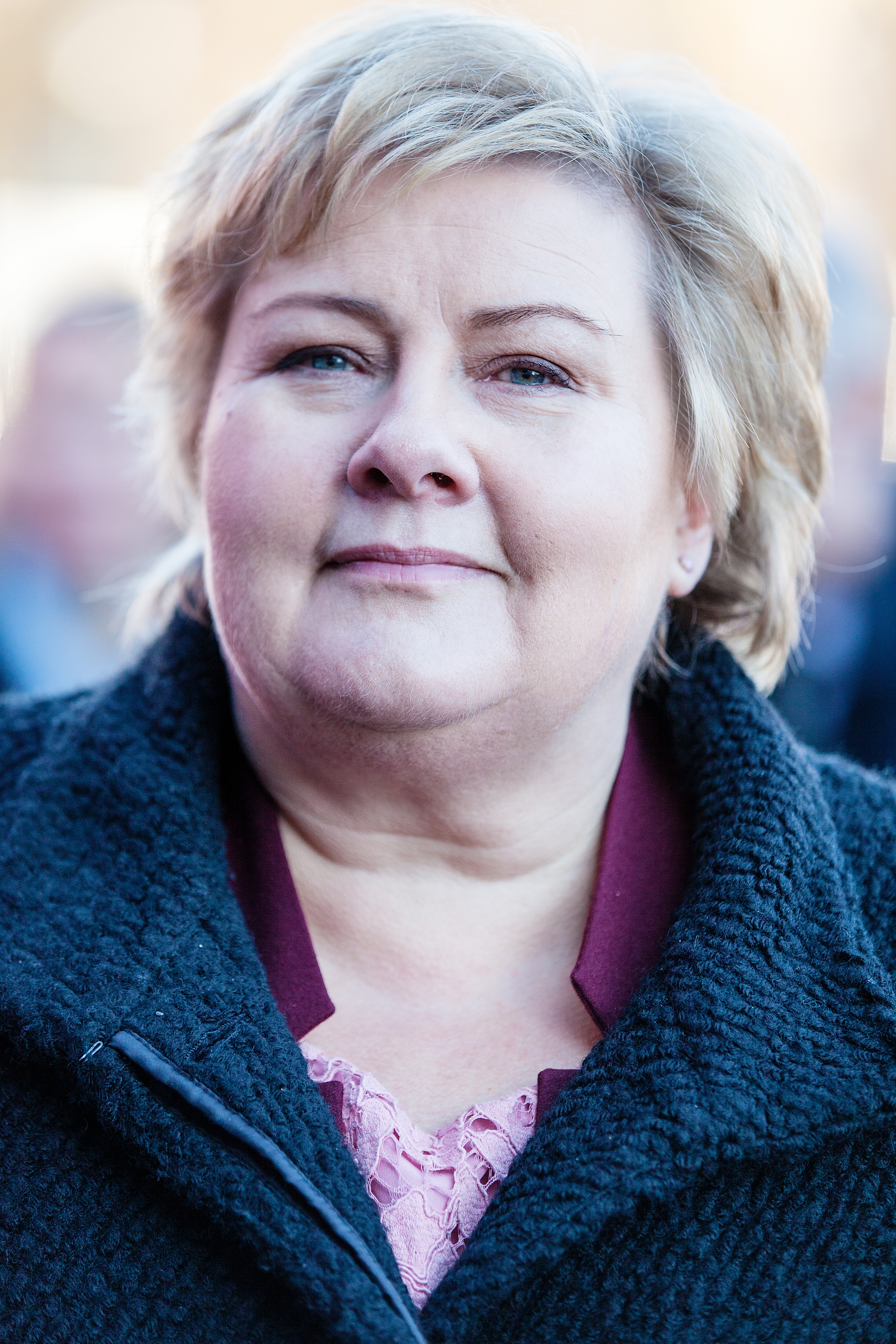
Former Prime Minister and Conservative Party leader Erna Solberg proposed the act, which received multi-partisan support (over 85% of those present during the vote) from her own Conservative Party, the Labour Party, the Progress Party, the Liberal Party, the Socialist Left Party and the Green Party.

The Gender Recognition Act (Norwegian: Lov om endring av juridisk kjønn) was adopted by the Norwegian parliament, the Storting, on 6 June 2016, was promulgated by the King-in-Council on 17 June and took effect on 1 July 2016. Under the act citizens may change their legal gender by notification to the National Population Register. The act was proposed by the Conservative-led government of Erna Solberg and received multi-partisan support from over 85% of all voting MPs representing parties ranging from the conservatives to the left-socialists. It was welcomed by the LGBTIQ+ organizations, the feminist movement and human rights experts as a milestone for LGBTIQ+ rights, bringing Norway in line with international best practice in this area under international human rights law.

== Content ==
Under the act every citizen over the age of 16, the age of consent in Norway, may change their legal gender (Note: a distinction between (biological) sex and (social or legal) gender does not exist in the Norwegian language; the word kjønn means both (the word sex only means sexual intercourse in Norwegian). In government usage kjønn is officially translated into English as gender, the preferred modern term. A distinction between legal gender and biological sex has no legal relevance under Norwegian law.) by notification to the National Population Register via an electronic form. Changing the legal gender has the same legal effect as being assigned a gender at birth, and Norwegian authorities do not record a person's former gender identification in official documents or in the National Population Register. Those between the ages of 6 and 16 may only change their legal gender with the consent of all their legal guardians, in most cases both parents. If only one parent consents, the child may only change their legal gender with the approval of the responsible County Governor, if the Governor determines that the application by the child and one of their parents is in the best interest of the child. While the notification to the National Population Register itself is a straightforward procedure, those who change their gender are assigned a new Norwegian identification number corresponding to the gender in question, as identification numbers identity a person's gender, making the entire process of changing legal gender much more cumbersome, as all personal documents and forms of identification (e.g. BankID) need to be changed separately. Changing legal gender will therefore usually take significant time and effort, as the effect is that the old identity and identification number cease to exist; thus a person will need to apply for new personal documents and reestablish their identity with a number of services.

== History of the act ==
The act was proposed by the Conservative-led government of Erna Solberg and received multi-partisan support; it was supported by 79 members of parliament representing the Conservative Party, the Labour Party, the Progress Party, the Liberal Party, the Socialist Left Party and the Green Party, and opposed by 13 members of parliament mostly representing the Christian Party and the agrarian Centre Party. It has been described as a breakthrough for LGBTIQ+ rights in Norway, making Norway the fourth country to adopt such a law, following Denmark, Malta and Ireland. It was supported by LGBTIQ+ rights organizations such as the Norwegian Organisation for Sexual and Gender Diversity, by Amnesty International and by the feminist movement, notably by the Norwegian Association for Women's Rights and the Norwegian Women's Lobby. Anne Hellum, a law professor and member of the Norwegian Association for Women's Rights, said the act was necessary for Norway to meet its legal obligations under human rights law and anti-discrimination law, as the previous system discriminated against and violated the human rights of transgender people.

Under the Equality and Anti-Discrimination Act and the Norwegian Penal Code discrimination and hate speech on the basis of someone's gender identity or gender expression is prohibited, regardless of whether the person has changed their legal gender. The changes to the Norwegian Penal Code, which carry a maximum penalty of three years imprisonment for discriminating or engaging in hate speech against someone on the basis of their gender identity or gender expression, were also introduced by the Conservative-led government of Erna Solberg and took effect in 2021. They also received widespread support from human rights organizations, the LGBTIQ+ rights organizations and the feminist movement, including the Norwegian Association for Women's Rights. In 2021 the first person was criminally convicted for hate speech against a transgender person, receiving a fine and a 21-day suspended prison sentence.

== Background ==
In the 2010s several European countries have reformed their gender recognition legislation to remove intrusive medical requirements and allow for self-identification. As of 2023, eleven European countries have legal gender recognition procedures based on self-determination of the person: Belgium, Denmark, Finland, Iceland, Ireland, Luxembourg, Malta, Norway, Portugal, Spain and Switzerland. Similar reforms are proposed by the government or underway in Germany and Scotland.

In a June 2020 report, the European Commission classified the legal procedures for gender recognition of 28 European countries into 5 categories based on the barriers to access and compliance with international human rights law. Non-EU members Norway and Iceland were described as having similar procedures as the top category that included EU member states Belgium, Denmark, Ireland, Luxembourg, Malta and Portugal.
