= Rabita Mosque =

Mosque in Oslo, Norway

Coordinates: 59°54′58″N 10°45′14″E

The Rabita Mosque (Norwegian: Rabita-moskéen) is a mosque in Oslo, Norway that is supervised by Basim Ghozlan. It has around 3,000 active members.

The mosque was visited by King Harald V of Norway and Haakon, Crown Prince of Norway in 2009.

== History ==
The mosque was originally established in 1987 in rented place. After moving to several rented places, the mosque finally settled at a permanent place in 2004 until today.

== Controversy ==
The mosque has been criticised for associations with Islamism and extremism. Critics have pointed to a number of jihadists, who originated from the mosque, as well as to the mosque supervisor, Basim Ghozlan, who has allegedly tacitly supported the Muslim Brotherhood and failed to distance himself from the views of the likes of Yusuf al-Qaradawi. Former members of the mosque include; Hassan Abdi Dhuhulow, a perpetrator of the Kenyan Westgate shopping mall attack and a prolific user on a website hosted by the mosque; Anders Cameroon Østensvig Dale, a Norwegian convert terrorist; and the first Norwegian suicide bomber in Iraq. It is also well known for being the mosque in Norway that has housed the most Norwegian jihadists to Syria and Iraq. Zaniar Matapour, the perpetrator of the 2022 Oslo shooting was also seen praying in the mosque on the day of the attack. After being criticised for hosting hate preachers at conferences, the mosque has withdrawn its invitations to certain preachers.

In 2013 a 21-year-old woman died of a heart attack in the mosque, reportedly after being subjected to an exorcism, a procedure officially prohibited by the mosque.

In 2014, the mosque, which is also known by its organisational name the Islamic Association (Norwegian: Det Islamske Forbundet), was listed as a terrorist organisation by the United Arab Emirates along with mosques in Denmark, Sweden and Finland. The probable cause for the listing was thought to be that the mosque was identified as being a part of the Muslim Brotherhood. The Nordic governments, in a joint diplomatic action, requested answers from the United Arab Emirates for the reasons behind the terrorist listings.

in 2026 Egypt lists Islamic Association in Norway as Terrorists.
