= Arfan Bhatti =

Norwegian Islamist activist (born 1977)

- Born: 9 August 1977 (age 48); Oslo, Norway
- Organization: Profetens Ummah
- Known for: Being a leading figure of Islamism in Norway

Arfan Bhatti (born 9 August 1977) is a Norwegian Islamist activist and a leading figure of the Profetens Ummah.

In 2026, a lower court in Norway handed down a verdict, in regard to the trial against Bhatti for his alleged part in the 2022 Oslo shooting; the verdict says that he will be imprisoned for at least 30 years; however, he has appealed the case.

== Early life ==
Bhatti was born and raised in Oslo to parents of Pakistani origin from the city of Gujrat. He spent several years in Pakistan during his childhood in addition to attending school in Norway, but was eventually brought under the care of a child protection institution. He joined the criminal youth gang Young Guns when he was thirteen years old, and when he was fifteen years old he hit the owner of a local grocery store in the head with a glass bottle so that it shattered and then stabbed the victim in the abdomen numerous times, for which he received his first criminal conviction.

In 1998 he was convicted for having shot a person as part of an extortion assignment. The court psychiatrist then concluded that Bhatti had "insufficiently developed mental capacities", and as part of later court proceedings in 2004 and in 2006 assessors concluded that he had dissocial personality disorder. Bhatti resided in Pakistan in the early 2000s, and during this time he was described to have become more religious and more extreme.

== Oslo Synagogue attack ==
Bhatti was in 2006 charged for shots fired against the Oslo Synagogue, and for planning to detonate bombs against the American and Israeli embassies in Oslo. Earlier the same year he had been stopped by police in Germany with pictures and notes concerning weaponry, which he claimed to be for self-defence during travels in the Middle East. He was convicted for co-conspiracy to the shots fired against the synagogue in 2008, but acquitted for terror plans against the American and Israeli embassies. He was held in custody for three years, from 2006 to 2009 in connection with the case.

In 2006 he was charged but not convicted for shots fired against the home of journalist Nina Johnsrud of the newspaper Dagsavisen.

== Profetens Ummah ==
Bhatti first appeared publicly as an Islamist in January 2012 as the leader of a group of protesters outside the Storting, the Norwegian parliament building, from the Islamist group Profetens Ummah. He has been described as a key and leading figure in Profetens Ummah.

In August 2012 he was dismissed from attending a court proceeding against Mullah Krekar. In May 2015, Bastian Vasquez, a Profetens Ummah member, was executed by fellow ISIL members, after he had killed the two-year-old stepson of Bhatti.

== Arrest in Pakistan ==
In 2012 it was initially reported by some news outlets that Bhatti had travelled to fight in Syria along with other Norwegian jihadists, but it was soon reported by other sources that he probably was in Pakistan instead. Bhatti was later found to have been imprisoned in northern Pakistan from January 2013 to August 2014, although he according to his lawyer was eventually acquitted from his charges of having had contacts with the Taliban.

He appeared in Norway again in January 2015 after a flight ban against him had been lifted. After his return he was detained by the police and charged with two domestic violence cases. In March he reportedly met and brought personal belongings to fellow member of Profetens Ummah Omar Cheblal in Greece, who had been expelled from Norway. Bhatti was at the same time sentenced to ten months in prison for domestic violence against his children, but appealed the verdict. In April he went on a pilgrimage to Mecca. In June he was stopped on the Turkish border and denied entry into the country by Turkish authorities deeming him a "danger to national security". Bhatti claimed that he had only planned a vacation at a hotel in the country. In late July Bhatti was arrested with new violence charges. He began serving his ten-month domestic violence sentence in August after the verdict was upheld in courts of appeal. In January 2016 he was sentenced to fourteen days in prison for violence against his wife.

== Personal life ==
Bhatti has been married three times, he first married a Pakistani woman in 2003 whom he had been engaged to since 1995. They had three children together. They were later divorced, and Bhatti was in 2012 charged with domestic violence against his ex-wife and children, and at the same time lost custody of his children.

He subsequently had Muslim marriages with two other women, first with Norwegian-Algeri flight stewardess Maryam Salvesen in 2010 and later with Norwegian-Pakistani Aisha Shezadi in 2012. His marriage to Shezadi went badly and he left her shortly after the wedding and divorced her while he was in Pakistan. The couple had one son together, Salahuddin, who died shortly after Shezadi took him to Syria with her in late 2014.

According to court documents he has at least one other child. Bhatti had a romantic relationship with a journalist for the television station TV 2 in 2006, in the period before the attack against the Oslo Synagogue.

== See also ==
- Ugbad and Rahma Saddiq
- Khaled Sharrouf
- Ifthekar Jaman
- Sayid Hussein Feisal Ali Warabe
