= Norwegian Organisation for Sexual and Gender Diversity =

LGBT rights organisation

- Founded: 1949/1992
- Headquarters: Oslo
- President: Inge Alexander Gjestvang
- Website: foreningenfri.no

The Norwegian Organisation for Sexual and Gender Diversity (Norwegian: FRI – foreningen for kjønns- og seksualitetsmangfold) is the oldest, largest and preeminent Norwegian member organization representing the interests of gay, lesbian, bisexual, transgender and intersex persons in Norway.

It originated as the Norwegian branch of the Danish Circle of 1948 (now LGBT Danmark) in 1949 and later became an independent organization. It was Norway's first gay rights organization, and campaigned against the criminalization of sexual relations between men (sexual relations between women were never criminalized because women were then not considered to have an independent sexuality). It eventually expanded its focus to include all LGBTIQ+ rights. Membership is open to anyone who supports the organization's goals.

It was known as the National Association for Lesbian, Gay, Bisexual and Transgender People (Norwegian: Landsforeningen for lesbiske, homofile, bifile og transpersoner; LLH) until 2016. Inge Alexander Gjestvang became president of the organization in 2020. The organization cooperates with the Government of Norway, and receives substantial public funding for its activities. Internationally it cooperates with its British counterpart Stonewall and is a partner of the Global Equality Fund of the United States Department of State. It has around 5,000 members and its central secretariat has around 20 employees.

== History ==
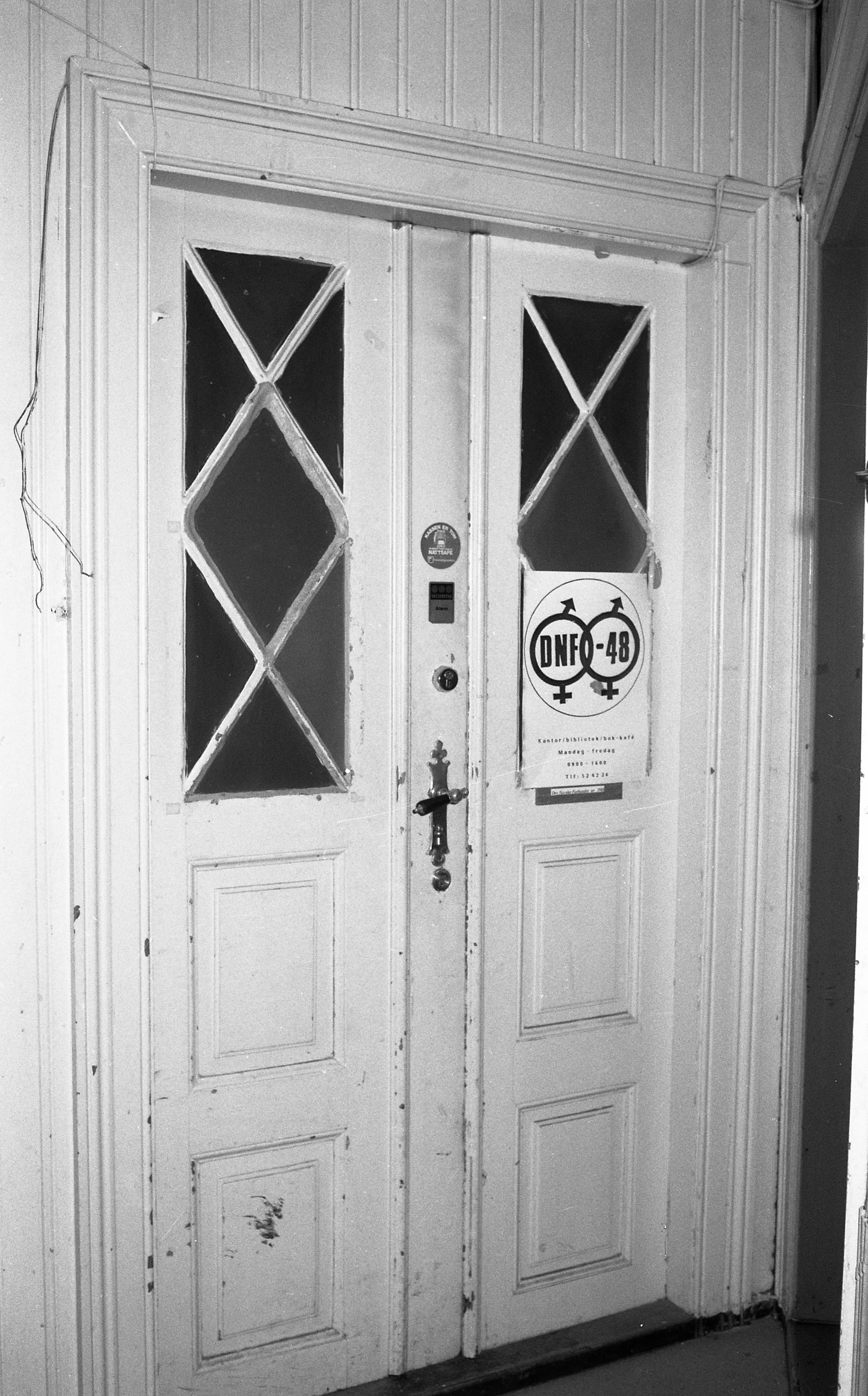
Entrance to the offices of the Norwegian Forbundet av 1948, photographed in 1988

The organization originated as the Norwegian branch of the Danish Circle of 1948 (now LGBT Danmark), which accepted two representatives in Norway in 1949. The Norwegian branch of the Danish association was formally inaugurated on 20 May 1950, thereby becoming the first Norwegian organization for gays and the start of organized work for gay rights in Norway. In 1953, the organization's name was changed to Det norske forbundet av 1948 (DNF 48). At this time, homosexuality was a criminal offence in Norway, in addition to being a psychiatric diagnosis. The organization worked in secrecy out of concern for criminal prosecution and discrimination. It would take 15 years before someone began to openly represent the organization: Karen-Christine Friele (Kim), who from 1965 was the openly lesbian editor of DNF's first journal, OSS (English: US). In 1968, Kim Friele took over as leader of DNF 48, and from 1971 to 1989 she acted as secretary general of the organization.

In 1976, DNF 48 was split into factions, one of the factions becoming Fellesrådet for homofile organisasjoner (English: Joint council for gay organizations). The factions were again united when LLH was created 29 November 1992. At the national congress in June 2008, the organization's name was changed from Landsforeningen for lesbisk og homofil frigjøring (English: The National Association for Lesbian and Gay Liberation) to LLH, which had formerly been the abbreviation. LLH now stood for Landsforeningen for lesbiske, homofile, bifile og transpersoner (English: The National Association for Lesbian, Gay, Bisexual and Transgender People). At the national congress In 2016, the organization's name was changed to FRI – foreningen for kjønns- og seksualitetsmangfold.

In February 2014, the Amnesty International and the National Association for Lesbians, Gays, Bisexuals and Transgender People called on the Norwegian government to modify current laws and practices, guarantee the termination of the sterilization requirement, allow for gender recognition to be accessible to everyone, and allow transgender people to be able to access the health treatments and procedures they wish to be done, all in an attempt to attack the lack of rights for transgender people in Europe.

FRI's Oslo branch hosts the event Oslo Pride every year.

=== Anti-LGBT+ hate ===
Anti-LGBT groups have actively campaigned against Oslo Pride on social media, portraying “Pride ideology” and/or gender ideology as a threat to traditional values. Notably, the leader of anti-trans group Women's Declaration International (WDI) is investigated for hate speech against an employee of FRI. Professor Elisabeth L. Engebretsen has analyzed the social media activities of the anti-gender movement in Norway and noted that the groups and individuals associated with WDI, such as anonymous Twitter users targeting FRI, are part of a "complex threat to democracy" that "represent[s] a reactionary populist backlash to basic human rights principles," and that they seek to "demonize the very basics of trans existence."

=== 2022 attack against Oslo Pride ===
In June 2022, Oslo Pride, the local LGBT pride event hosted by the Oslo branch of FRI, was targeted by a gunman who committed a mass shooting at sites associated with the event. The police is investigating the incident as a terrorist attack. As a result, Oslo Pride was canceled that year. The head of the Norwegian government's Extremism Commission, Cathrine Thorleifsson and Amnesty International, linked the attack to a pattern of increased attacks on LGBT+ people in Norway and Europe, both on extremist online forums and open social media platforms.

== Activities ==
The organization works for equality and against all forms of discrimination based on gender or sexuality in Norway and in the rest of the world, as stated in the organization's policy paper. It is a partner body of the Global Equality Fund run by the United States Department of State. The organization had about 4,100 members in 2022.

== See also ==
- LGBT rights in Norway
- List of LGBT rights organisations
- Gaysir
