= Profetens Ummah =

Islamist organisation based in Norway

The Prophet's Ummah
- Profetens Ummah
- The flag of the Islamic State of Iraq and the Levant.
- Founder: Ubaydullah Hussain
- Founded: 2011
- Dates active: 2011–2017
- Dissolved: 2017
- Allegiance: Islamic State
- Ideology: Jihadism; Islamic extremism
- Status: Disbanded

Profetens Ummah ("The Prophet's Ummah", Arabic: أمة النبي) was a Salafi-jihadist Islamist organisation based in Norway. During its emergence in late 2011, the group has become notorious for its vocal demonstrations, as well as statements praising Islamic terrorism.

Several Norwegian politicians and commentators have condemned the group for its anti-democratic and violent message. Originally inspired by late Al-Qaeda ideologue Anwar al-Awlaki, Profetens Ummah has later pledged support for the Islamic State of Iraq and the Levant and its leader Abu Bakr al-Baghdadi. Several Norwegian foreign fighters for ISIL in the Syrian Civil War have a background of involvement with the group.

== History ==
=== Emergence ===
The group first started emerging publicly in early 2012, after being founded sometime in late 2011. Many members of the group had taken part in the 2008–09 Oslo riots. In September 2012, in connection to the worldwide Reactions to Innocence of Muslims the organization held a demonstration of around 150 people in front of the United States embassy in Oslo. The views expressed by the demonstrators at the event were later denounced as being "Islamofascist". During the demonstrations, which included several ex-convicts, the speakers praised the late Al-Qaeda leader Osama bin Laden, whom a group spokesperson called "the most learned Muslim who has stood up for Islam". One month later, the group confirmed to have sent "several dozen" members to the Syrian Civil War as fighters, as well as having one member already killed during the Battle of Aleppo. At the same time, the group warned of possible attacks against Norway.

In October, the Norwegian Police Security Service confirmed that they were monitoring the group. The monitoring was escalated following reports that several members of the group had gained hunting licenses and begun the process of acquiring firearms. A person with a valid hunting license in Norway may acquire up to six rifles or shotguns, if he is given clearance by police. Around the same time, the leader of the group Ubaydullah Hussain published a message on social media, confirming his intent of acquiring automatic weapons, at the same time launching a profanity-laden verbal assault on the Jews in Norway. The day after, as a response, the Oslo police opened an official investigation into the statements as well as previous threats against two journalists. The police raided several locations associated with the group, and arrested Hussain. As a result of these actions, Profetens Ummah in November of that year for the first time held a press conference in Oslo, where they verbally attacked the police, the security services as well as the media. They stated that Norway was a dictatorship, that the press were involved in a witch-hunt on Islamists, and that all Muslims worldwide should demonstrate in front of Norwegian embassies. In December the group confirmed that it was establishing ties with the now-banned British extremist group Islam4UK, and posed pictures of its leaders posing together with Anjem Choudary. The group would also protest during the trial of Mullah Krekar in Norway.

=== Internal strife ===
Subsequent to the press conference, the group saw a decline in activity. According to the news channel TV 2, this was due to extensive internal strife in the central leadership. One of the reasons was that some of the members, including leader Ubaydullah Hussain received public welfare while being unemployed, after the group publicly had claimed that public funds financed warfare against Islam. Other members, such as Arfan Bhatti believed that receiving any assistance from the Kuffar (non-believers), including welfare, is specifically forbidden according to the Shari'ah law.

Another source of the strife was that several members had secretly married women after meeting them on Facebook, only to initiate a Talaq (Islamic divorce) after a few weeks, to then marry another. Several women who had since left the group subsequently denounced the organization. Furthermore, the group's leader (or Amiir) Hussain had reportedly married a Kurdish woman in secret, against her family's wishes and without prior consultation, which was in direct violation of the Islamic marital practices. This particular incident led to fury within the group. As female members withdrew, prominent member Egzon Avdyli publicly warned members against engaging in "Shia marriages". Mounting discontent with Hussain's private life led to his resignation as a leader in March 2013. Further weakening of the group followed. By late 2015, most of the group's leadership was either imprisoned or killed in Syria. The group itself reported that it still has an "active core" of between 15 and 20 individuals in addition to an unknown number of sympathizers.

== Views and ideology ==
The organization itself claims to be Salafist. On its website, it states that it rejects everything except the "pure salafist Islamic faith and teachings". The largest Salafist organization in Norway, Islam Net, has rejected the group as Salafist and denounced it as a Khariji sect. This was echoed by columnist and commentator Mohammad Usman Rana. The Store norske leksikon encyclopedia describes the group as Salafi-jihadist. It has also been described as Wahhabi-inspired. According to the Norwegian Police Security Service, then-leader Ubaydullah Hussain was a de facto member of ISIL in the period between August 2013 to December 2015. In several media interviews, he publicly acknowledged to ISIL leader Abu Bakr al-Baghdadi as "our leader".

== Membership ==
There have been no official estimates of membership of the organization. The group's closed Facebook group had 641 members before it was removed. Participants at events and demonstrations have ranged from 40 to 150. Most of the leadership of the group have long criminal backgrounds with multiple arrests or convictions. The Norwegian Police Security Service (PST) and the Section for organised crime in the Oslo Police district are co-operating to monitor this group. Several of the group's members have travelled to Syria to fight for ISIL. Hassan Abdi Dhuhulow, one of the perpetrators of the 2013 Westgate shopping mall attack in Kenya had contacts with central members of the group.

=== Notable members ===
- Ubaydullah Hussain: Born in Oslo to Pakistani parents. Founding member and original leader for the group. Arrested in 2012, and eventually convicted of threats and hate-speech against Jews, and sentenced to 120 days in prison. He has been the leader or "Amiir" of the group since its emergence. In 2015 he was again arrested and charged with having recruited at least seven foreign fighters for ISIL in the Syrian Civil War. Currently imprisoned serving a nine-year sentence.
- Arfan Bhatti: Born in Oslo to Pakistani parents. Background in the gang-related criminal underworld in Oslo. He turned to Islamism after being released from prison in 2002. In 2008 he was convicted for co-conspiracy to the attack against the Oslo Synagogue with automatic weapons. He was imprisoned in Pakistan from 2013 to 2015. In January 2015 he was under arrest and imprisoned in Oslo, charged with assaulting his ex-wife as well as abusing his children. Since 2016 he has been the current spokesperson of the group.
- Mohyeldeen Mohammad: Born in England to Iraqi parents (Norway since age three), became widely known after terror-threats in a speech during an illegal demonstration of 3,000 Muslims in Oslo in February 2010, and for defending capital punishment for homosexuality. Spent time alongside fighters in Syria during 2012. Currently imprisoned after being convicted of making threats of violence against politician Abid Raja.
- Bastian Vasquez: Born in Norway to Chilean parents, Vasquez was charged in 2012 with death threats against Prime Minister Jens Stoltenberg and the Royal Family. Travelled to Syria shortly after and joined ISIL, appearing in at least one propaganda video. Presumed to have been executed by the group in early 2015.
- Egzon Avdyli: Born in Kosovo, acted as official spokesperson while Hussain was imprisoned. Joined ISIL in Syria in December 2013, killed in April 2014.
- Omar Cheblal: An Algerian citizen, Cheblal spent 10 years in prison in Morocco before moving to Norway. He was wanted in Algeria after being sentenced in absentia for trafficking arms to the terrorist group GIA. Was the spokesperson for Profetens Ummah until being deemed a threat to national security and expelled from Norway in March 2014 (during which time he was in Greece). Joined ISIL in Iraq and killed near Mosul in late 2015.
- Adnan Shaluni: Born in Kosovo, and later moved to Sweden, operates under the name "Abu Arijon". As of 2016, he was in the process of being deported.
- Abu Aluevich Edelbijev: Born in Chechnya before settling in Norway. He joined and became active in the group in 2012. Went to Syria and joined ISIL in 2013. He was killed during the Battle of Kobani in late 2014.
