= Antisemitism in Norway =

Antisemitism in Norway refers to antisemitic incidents and attitudes encountered by Jews, either individually or collectively, in Norway. The mainstream Norwegian political environment has strongly adopted a platform that rejects antisemitism. However, individuals may privately hold antisemitic views. Currently, there are about 1,400 Jews in Norway, in a population of 5.3 million.

Antisemitism has existed in Norway for centuries. For example, the 1814 constitution included a paragraph banning Jews from entering the country. Antisemitism has also been a subject of discussion in the public debate about the Arab–Israeli conflict. According to several political commentators, the antisemitism in Norway is institutional. Conservative secular Jewish-American Lawyer Alan Dershowitz sharply criticized Norway for its treatment of Jews, writing that "All Jews are apparently the same in this country that has done everything in its power to make life in Norway nearly impossible for Jews." Norway was apparently the first modern nation to make stunning of domestic animals compulsory, outlawing the method for production of Kosher meat.

An example cited as indicating the post-war Norwegian government's attitude to Norwegian Jewish citizens was the government's refusal to finance the return of deported Jewish Norwegians after 1945. According to historian Kjersti Dybvig, the Norwegian government should give an official apology to its Jewish citizens, noting:

Most of the Jews arrested in Norway [by the Nazis] were Norwegian citizens. When arrested, they lost their citizenship. And when the White Buses traveled down [southward from Scandinavia] to fetch prisoners who had survived [the Holocaust], Jews could not join because they were no longer Norwegian citizens, and the [Norwegian] government after 8 May [1945] refused to finance their transportation home.

== Statistics and studies ==
An article published by the Jerusalem Center for Public Affairs stated that antisemitism in Norway comes mainly from the leadership – politicians, organization leaders, church leaders, and senior journalists. Despite other opinions claiming that antisemitism in Europe has its origins in Muslim immigration, the article puts the blame on the European Christian origins of antisemitism around the beginning of 1000 CE, centuries before Jews came to Norway. Another issue arising from the article is the publishing of antisemitic caricatures. Since the 1970s many pro-Palestinian caricatures have been published in the Norwegian media. But a comparison of these cartoons with antisemitic caricatures from the Nazi era reveals some affinities. Common motifs such as "Jews are evil and inhuman", "Jews rule and exploit the world" and "Jews hate peace and propagate wars" are expressed in recently published cartoons, as well as in the antisemitic cartoons from the beginning of the twentieth century.

== Recent incidents ==
=== 2004 cartoon in a Norwegian newspaper ===
On January 7, 2004, the Norwegian newspaper Dagsavisen printed an editorial cartoon that depicted a Haredi Jew rewriting the Ten Commandments to include "thou shall murder".

=== Shooting and vandalism at Oslo synagogue ===
There have been episodes of desecration of the Oslo Synagogue. On 17 September 2006, the Oslo synagogue was attacked with an automatic weapon, only days after it was publicised that the building was an intended target for the Algerian terror group GSPC that had been plotting a bombing campaign in the Norwegian capital. The Oslo synagogue is under continuous surveillance and protected by barriers. On 2 June 2008, Arfan Bhatti was convicted of the shooting attack and given an eight-year suspended sentence for serious vandalism. The Oslo city court judge could not find sufficient evidence that the shots fired at the synagogue amounted to a terrorist act.

=== Institutional racism claim, and reply by a former PM ===
In 2008, a symposium held by the Jerusalem Center for Public Affairs, entitled Behind the Humanitarian Mask: The Nordic Countries, Israel and the Jews, accused Norway and Sweden of institutional racism against Jews. Dr Manfred Gerstenfeld, chairman of the Board of Fellows at the Jerusalem Center for Public Affairs, said that "Norway is the most anti-Semitic country in Scandinavia." Former Prime Minister Kåre Willoch responded to the accusations at the symposium by arguing that allegations of antisemitism is a "traditional deflection tactic aimed at diverting attention from the real problem, which is Israel's well-documented and incontestable abuse of Palestinians."

=== A comedian's remark about fleas and lice on gassed Jews ===
On 27 November 2008 the satirical comedian Otto Jespersen said during a satiric monologue on national television that

I would like to take the opportunity to remember all the billions of fleas and lice that lost their lives in German gas chambers, without having done anything wrong other than settling on persons of Jewish background.

— Otto Jespersen

A complaint against Jespersen, was filed by Imre Hercz; the Norwegian Press Complaints Commission sided with Hercz in 2009. A number of fellow comedians and his TV station have backed the controversial performer. Jespersen also presented a satirical monologue on antisemitism that ended with, "Finally, I would like to wish all Norwegian Jews a Merry Christmas – no, what am I saying! You don't celebrate Christmas, do you!? It was you who crucified Jesus.", on 4 December. Jespersen has received criticism for several of his satirical attacks on social and ethnic groups as well as royalty, politicians and celebrities, and in defence of the monologue TV2 noted that Jespersen attacks in all directions, and that "if you should take [the monologue] seriously, there are more than just the Jews that should feel offended."

=== Allegation that a former PM made a racist remark ===
In December 2008, the Norwegian author and journalist Mona Levin claimed Kåre Willoch made an allegedly racist statement when his response to the question whether the United States was likely to change their Middle East policy was: "It doesn’t look too good, because he has chosen a Chief of Staff who is a Jew, and, as we know, many American voters look much more to the Bible than to the reality of our days – and with a meaninglessly mistaken interpretation of the Bible." Levin made the accusation of Willoch making a racist statement on a live TV debate, Willoch denied the accusation, and received support from the three other debaters, excluding Levin. Willoch called Levin's allegations a "total distortion of his statements" adding that "This was a purely political assessment of whether this chief of staff will lead to greater or lesser changes in the relationship to the Middle East, and I imagine that it will lead to a more pro-Israel politic from USA."

=== 2009 Oslo riots ===
In January 2009, anti-Israel protests in Oslo degenerated into anti-Jewish riots, with a non-Jewish pro-Israel supporter—carrying an Israeli flag—attacked by anti-Israel protesters shouting "take him, he's a Jew" and "fucking Jew". Some of the youngest rioters reported to have been told by older youths to "hunt for Jews", with one group severely beating up a shop owner accused of being a Jew. During the riots, almost 200 people were arrested, the majority of which had non-Norwegian names. Among other slogans, protesters shouted "Death to the Jews", "Kill the Jews", "Slaughter the Jews" in Arabic.

Eirik Eiglad, a Norwegian socialist activist who was present in Oslo during the riots, wrote the book The Anti-Jewish Riots in Oslo (2010), stating:

As far as I can judge, these were the largest anti-Jewish riots in Norwegian history. Even before and during World War II, when anti-Semitic prejudices were strong, public policies were discriminatory, and the Nazified State Police efficiently confiscated Jewish property and deported Jews on that despicable slave ship SS Donau—even then, Norway had not seen anti-Jewish outbursts of this scale. This country had no previous history of wanton anti-Jewish mass violence.

In cooperation with Norwegian education authorities, Islamic leaders in Norway initiated "dialogue meetings" with youths in mosques following the riots, with the aim of "using the Quran" to reach out to youths who had participated in the riots.

=== 2009 articles in Jerusalem Post alleging rise of antisemitism in Norway ===
In 2009, two articles in The Jerusalem Post discussed the alleged rise of antisemitism in Norway. The articles stirred controversy in Norway, and several notable Norwegian Jews refuted the article. It also received strong criticism for basing the allegations on statements from controversial sources, most notably a source that later turned out to be lying about both his identity and his affiliation with the Norwegian army. The responses from Norwegian Jews led to Jerusalem Post posting a follow-up piece called "Inside story: Stumbling in Norway" retracting many of the allegations, and summing up the response from Norwegian Jews:

In general, they say, Norway does not suffer from widespread anti-Semitism. Norwegian Jews are an accepted and respected part of the country. But, they add, there are rare incidents of tension over their Jewishness, usually with children being teased in school or with Muslim immigrants bringing their politics into their day-to-day meetings with Jews.

=== 2010 Norwegian Broadcasting Corporation report ===
In 2010, the Norwegian Broadcasting Corporation reported that antisemitic attitudes were prevalent at some Norwegian schools. Teachers at schools with large shares of Muslims revealed that Muslim students often "praise or admire Adolf Hitler for his killing of Jews", that "Jew-hate is legitimate within vast groups of Muslim students" and that "Muslims laugh or demand [teachers] to stop when trying to educate about the Holocaust". Additionally that "while some students might protest when some express support for terrorism, none object when students express hate of Jews" and that it says in "the Quran that you shall kill Jews, all true Muslims hate Jews". Most of these students were said to be born and raised in Norway. One Jewish father also told that his child after school had been taken by a Muslim mob (though managed to escape), reportedly "to be taken out to the forest and hanged because he was a Jew".

Norwegian Education Minister Kristin Halvorsen referred to the antisemitism reported in this study as being "completely unacceptable." The head of a local Islamic council joined Jewish leaders and Halvorsen in denouncing such antisemitism.

=== 2011 complaint by Israeli embassy ===
The Norwegian Broadcasting Council is composed of eight members appointed by the Norwegian parliament and six appointed by the government. In April 2011, it appointed an independent external investigation by Middle East expert Cecilie Hellestveit of the International Law and Policy Unit into complaints made by the Israeli embassy in Norway that the Norwegian Broadcasting (NRK) had been biased. A majority of the council decided that NRK's coverage had been "reliable, balanced and thorough".

=== Kosher meat production ban and boycott of members of Israel's academia ===
Alan Dershowitz stated, regarding efforts by Norwegian academics to institute a boycott of Israelis that while administrations of Norwegian universities "have refused to go along with this form of collective punishment of all Israeli academics... in practice...Jewish pro-Israel speakers are subject to a de facto boycott" and cited this as a reason why the faculties of several Norwegian universities refused to invite him to speak about Israel (although he did subsequently give three lectures at the invitation of student groups). Dershowitz wrote that the only other country that prevented him from lecturing at its universities was South Africa during the apartheid era.

=== 2011 survey of physical threats and abuse of Jewish teenage students ===
In June 2011, a survey by the Oslo Municipality found that 33 per cent of Jewish students in Oslo are physically threatened or abused by other high school teens at least two to three times a month (compared to 10% for Buddhists and 5.3% of Muslims) The survey also found that 51% of high school students consider "Jew" a negative expression and 60% had heard other students use the term. In according with this, Manfred Gerstenfeld has pointed out in 2013 that Jewish people in Norway suffer from old-world stereotypes and prejudice. He also cited a survey from 2011 that found out that 38 percent of Norwegians believe that Israel is a Nazi state.

=== 2012 HL-senteret's report on antisemitism ===
In May 2012, the Center for Studies of the Holocaust and Religious Minorities published a report based on a survey on antisemitism in the Norwegian population. This was the first broad study on the issue. The report found that about 12.5% of those surveyed had distinct antisemitic prejudices. The level of antisemitism was found to be relatively low compared to other European countries, relatively similar to the United Kingdom, the Netherlands, Sweden and Denmark. Men, older people and those with little education showed more antisemitism than women, younger people and well-educated persons.

=== 2012 Organization for Security and Co-operation in Europe report ===
In October 2012, the Organization for Security and Co-operation in Europe issued a report regarding antisemitism in Norway, criticizing Norway for an increase in antisemitism in the country and blaming Norwegian officials for failing to address antisemitism. The OSCE also appealed to Norway to abolish a ban on Jewish ritual slaughter, which was in place since 1929, as an "important symbolic gesture."

=== 2013 comments by Norwegian Muslim leaders ===
In an interview with Dagsavisen in January 2013, Nehmat Ali Shah, the imam at Norway's largest mosque—the Central Jamaat-e Ahl-e Sunnat mosque—and mosque chairman Ghulam Sarwar claimed that the existing hostility between Muslims and Christians is caused by Jewish influence. Dagsavisen reported that the two men claimed that "the fear Jews instilled in others explained fraught Muslim-Jewish relations as well as the Holocaust" and that "Jewish influence caused Norwegians to have a negative view of Islam." During the interview, Ali Shah stated that "People are ignorant because they get their information from the media, and the media only write negatively about Islam. Judaism has a better grip on the media. The Jews control the media and that's detrimental." With regards to the Holocaust, Sarwar stated "Why did the Germans kill them? One reason is that they make other peoples fear them...[Jews are] not a simple people." Shah also stated that not all Jews "ruined things" and added that "dialogue is very important to us".

=== Antisemitic incidents during 2014 ===
- In April, a school and sports facility were sprayed with numerous swastikas and racist slogans.
- In September, a swastika was carved into the glass doors of the Trøndelag Theater the day after the premiere of a Jewish puppet theater performance.
- In October, a Jewish cemetery was vandalized in Trondheim with sprayed marks and the word "Führer" scribbled on the chapel.

=== A Muslim act of support in the Jewish community of Norway ===
In February 2015, more than 1,000 people formed a "ring of peace" around Oslo's main synagogue. This project was initiated by a group of young Muslims, as a respond to the latest terror attacks against Jewish centers in Europe. A similar event with approximately 200 participants was also taking place at the same time in Bergen, Norway's second largest city.

=== Norwegian attorney general rules that "Fuck Jews" can be interpreted as criticism of Israel ===
In March 2019, Attorney General Tor Aksel Busch ruled that the phrase "fuck Jews" could be understood as criticism of Israel, and using it was not criminal.

=== 2018 rapper Kaveh twitter and stage utterings ===
Norwegian rapper Kaveh wrote on Twitter, translated from Norwegian: "«ASAP ROCKY has 28 times better style? Fucking Jews are so corrupt." A few days later he went on stage as the headliner of the relatively small Haugen festival in Oslo, saying (translated): "- Are there any Muslims here?", being Muslim himself, "- Eid Mubarak to you all. - Are there any Christians here? [no answers] - Are there any Jews here? - Fuck Jews [small pause] - No, just kidding, we're all children of God". He later apologized and said he wanted to meet any offended children/youths who were present and apologize to them in person. He was reported to the police for this, but the charge was dropped on the grounds of being provocative but still within freedom of speech in Norway. State attorney Trude Antonsen agreed to the case being dropped and commented that while the statement was offending and untrue it is still outside criminal law and not punitive. The artist later stated "I am not a racist, I do not hate Jews".

=== 2019 NRK controversy ===
In July 2019, a cartoon produced and posted on Facebook by the state broadcaster NRK was widely panned for antisemitism. It featured an orthodox Jew participating in a game of Scrabble, where his opponent is hesitant to lay down his point-scoring yet deeply offensive word "Jew swine". The network received over 300 complaint letters, . NRK denied accusations of antisemitism, but removed the description "tag a Jew" from the video. The network previously apologized for spoofing the Holocaust in a 2016 cartoon, which it has still not been removed.

=== 2021 Israeli COVID-19 vaccine ===
Norwegian radio host Shaun Henrik Matheson said on air: "We must never forget what a sh**ty country Israel is!” and that the success of the COVID-19 vaccine in Israel made him "almost wish" that it had failed.

=== 2022 reopening of case about imam's post about killing Jews ===
In August 2022, media said that police were forced to reopen a case (that had been laid to rest), against an imam in Norway that in 2019 wrote on Facebook that "Hitler spared a few Jews so that the world can come to know how evil this [Jewish] nation is and why it is necessary to kill them"; the statement was made by one that at the time, "was the imam" at the Minhaj-ul-Quran mosque in Drammen, Norway.

=== NRK Jokes About Killing Jews In Televised Program - October 2025 ===
During an episode of Nytt på Nytt, a satirical news show, host Tuva Johannessen joked, “U.S. House Speaker Mike Johnson believes reasonable people thank America for bombing ships full of fentanyl — but if you replace fentanyl with Jews, suddenly you'll hear it's not okay”. The audience and panel members laughed, prompting Johannessen to continue with another remark referencing an earlier segment about smuggling porn magazines from Sweden to Norway. “Imagine if Jews were being smuggled from Sweden to Norway — that wouldn't work,” he said.

== See also ==
- History of Jews in Norway
- The Jewish community of Oslo et al. v. Norway
- Antisemitism in Europe
- Racism in Norway

== Bibliography ==
- Johansen, Per Ole (1984). Oss selv nærmest: Norge og jødene 1914–1943 (in Norwegian). Oslo: Gyldendal. ISBN 82-05-15062-1.
- Abrahamsen, Samuel (1991). Norway's Response to the Holocaust: A Historical Perspective. Holocaust Library. ISBN 0-89604-117-4.
- Søbye, Espen (2003). Kathe, alltid vært i Norge (in Norwegian). Oslo: Oktober. ISBN 82-7094-926-4.
- Mendelsohn, Oskar (1969). Jødenes historie i Norge gjennom 300 år: Bind 1 1660–1940 (in Norwegian). Universitetsforlaget. ISBN 82-00-02523-3.
- Mendelsohn, Oskar (1986). Jødenes historie i Norge gjennom 300 år: Bind 2 1940–1985 (in Norwegian) (2nd ed.). Universitetsforlaget. ISBN 82-00-02524-1.
- Mendelsohn, Oskar (1992). Jødene i Norge: Historien om en minoritet (in Norwegian). Universitetsforlaget. ISBN 82-00-21669-1.
- Fure, Odd Bjørn (June 23, 2003). "Antisemitism in Norway. Background paper" (PDF). The Organization for Security and Co-operation in Europe.
- Selbekk, Vebjørn (2001). Jødehat på norsk – Fra Eidsvollmennene til Boot Boys (in Norwegian). Skjetten: Hermon. ISBN 82-7341-936-3.
- Johansen, Per Ole (2006). På siden av rettsoppgjøret. Unipub. ISBN 978-82-7477-233-5.
- Kirsti Lothe Jacobsen (November 17, 2006). "Jøders rettsstilling i Norge – en historisk oversikt frem til 1851" (in Norwegian). University of Bergen University Library for Legal Studies. Archived from the original on July 2, 2007.
