= Herman Kahan =

Holocaust survivor

Herman Kahan (born Chaim Hersh Kahan; 15 February 1926 – 13 February 2020) was a Romanian-born Norwegian businessman, rabbi, author, and Holocaust survivor.

== Early life ==
Kahan was born into a Hasidic Jewish family in Sighet, Romania. Elie Wiesel was among his childhood friends.

== World War II and concentration camps ==
During World War II, when Northern Transylvania was part of Kingdom of Hungary (see Second Vienna Award), Kahan and two siblings were able to obtain "Aryan papers" in Budapest. After getting reports from his father in Sighet that Jews in the city were gathered into ghettos, he returned home to provide food.

In 1944, Kahan was deported to the Auschwitz concentration camp with his father, mother, and a sister. After arriving in the camp, his mother and sister were murdered in the gas chambers; Kahan and his father were selected as workers. After a couple of weeks, they were transported to the Wolfsberg camp near Breslau, and later to the Mauthausen-Gusen concentration camp and Ebensee concentration camp. Kahan experienced torture in all three camps; his father was also tortured. At the end of his time at Ebensee, Kahan lost consciousness and was thrown into a pile of corpses. American forces liberated the camp the same day, and while transporting the corpses to a mass grave, one of the American soldiers saw Kahan's hand move and pulled him out of the pile. Kahan's father died 10 days after liberation.

== Postwar ==
After the war Kahan moved to Paris and planned to go to the United States. He supported himself by selling knitwear he produced with knitting machines.

In 1947, he traveled to Norway to visit his sister and her husband. He decided to stay and was granted permission to settle as part of the Jewish refugee quota established to replace the number of Norwegian Jews murdered in the Holocaust.

In Norway, he established the textile factory Stabekk trikotasje (now Heka trikotasje), and the business was expanded into other areas. He was active in the Jewish community in Oslo, serving as leader of the Mosaic congregation (Det Mosaiske Trossamfund) for a time, was an active supporter of the Jewish Museum in Oslo, and was a board member of the Friends association of Norwegian Center for Studies of Holocaust and Religious Minorities.

His autobiography, Ilden og Lyset (English: The Fire and the Light), with a foreword by Elie Wiesel, was published in 1988 and published in English in 2006.

He was named Commander of the Order of St. Olav in 2013 for his efforts to promote tolerance and understanding.

== Personal ==
Kahan married a Jewish woman Ester Dante whom he met in Norway. He had five adult children and had grandchildren and great-grandchildren. One of his children is the actress and singer Bente Kahan. Herman Kahan died on 13 February 2020.

== Bibliography ==
- Kahan, Herman; Hansson, Knut M. (1988). Ilden og lyset [The Fire and the Light] (in Norwegian). Cappelen. ISBN 9788202112004.
- Kahan, Herman; Hansson, Knut M.; Wiesel, Elie; Kahn Zisken, Felice (2006). The Fire and the Light. Yad Vashem. ISBN 9780976442523.
