= Karl Johanssen =

Norwegian lawyer and journalist (1874–1931)

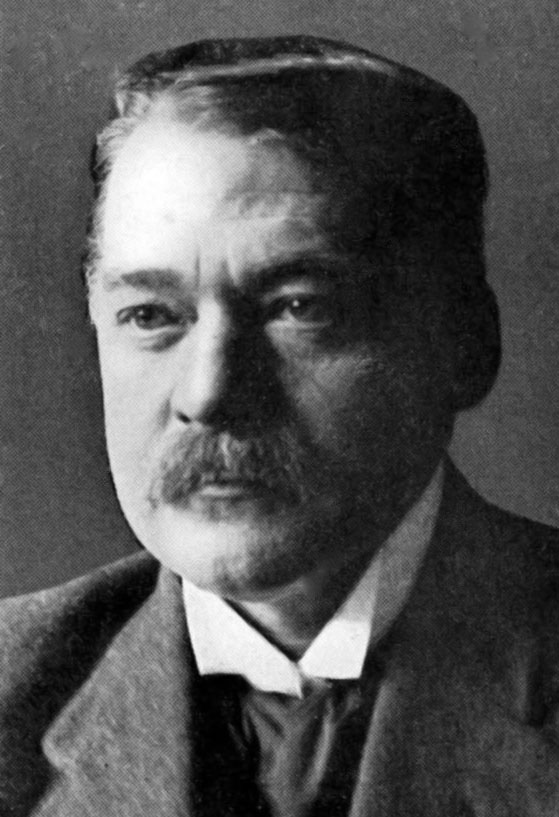

Karl Christen Johanssen (12 October 1874 – 20 November 1931) was a Norwegian lawyer and journalist.

Johanssen was born in Christiania, a son of teacher Nils Emil Severin Johanssen (1843–94) and Caroline Marie Augusta Peters (1840–1916). He was a nephew of Nicolai Herman Peters. He took the examen artium in 1892 and received the cand.jur. degree in 1896. He chaired the Norwegian Students' Society in 1901 and 1904, while working as a junior solicitor. From 1905 on, he was a barrister, with access to work with Supreme Court cases. From 1907 to 1909 he was a colonial administration judge in Boma, Belgian Congo.

He began his journalistic career in the newspaper Norske Intelligenssedler in 1914. In 1918 he was hired by Dagbladet, and in 1919 he was hired by Social-Demokraten (from 1923 named Arbeiderbladet). Here he was editor of foreign news until 1929. He also became one of Norway's first radio personalities, in the early days of the Norwegian Broadcasting Corporation. He delivered causeries in the program Sett og hørt.

Social-Demokraten was an organ of the Norwegian Labour Party, which was a member of Comintern; however Johanssen was not a member of the Labour Party. Some regarded him as speaking too freely, and he was denounced on the front page of Pravda. Comintern demanded that he be excluded from the Labour Party, but since he was not a member he was just excluded from Comintern. The Labour Party pulled out of Comintern in 1923.

Called a "bourgeois radical", Johanssen was known for his individualistic style. Although he spent some hours in the newspaper office every day, he was known for conducting much of his work while sitting at the restaurant Theatercaféen. Also, as was not unusual at the time, Johanssen was known for attacking numerous people of the press and politics in his columns. Among the people who were lambasted by Johanssen were politician Fredrik Anton Martin Olsen Nalum, bishop Johan Lunde as well as newspaper editors Johs Nesse and Rolf Thommessen. Johanssen also wrote highly critical articles about Mikal Sylten's antisemitic magazine Nationalt Tidsskrift, and when the first defamation lawsuit against Nationalt Tidsskrift took place in May 1927, Johanssen was brought to court as a witness against Sylten.

Johanssen died in 1931. He was honored with three memorial speeches and one memorial concert on Norwegian radio. In 1932, the Labour Party published the article collection Karl Johanssen: mennesket og journalisten, edited by Aksel Zachariassen. His portrait is displayed in Theatercaféen, still hanging there decades after his death.
