= Islamophobia in Norway =

Prejudice towards Islam or Muslims in Norway

Islamophobia in Norway refers to the set of discourses, behaviours and structures which express feelings of anxiety, fear, hostility and rejection towards Islam and/or Muslims in Norway. Islamophobia can manifest itself through discrimination in the workforce, negative coverage in the media, and violence against Muslims.

== Discrimination ==
In October 2015, a Muslim convert named Malika Bayan (née Charlotte Antonsen) was turned away from a hair salon in Bryne by a hairdresser named Merete Hodne who said that she saw the hijab as "a totalitarian symbol" and a "political symbol representing an ideology that frightens her", rather than a religious one. Hodne was subsequently charged 10,000 kroner for religious discrimination, after refusing to pay the initial fine of 8000 kroner. Former MP Peter N. Myhre sided with Hodne, arguing a hijab was similar to a Nazi uniform and denounced the court system for convicting her of discrimination. It was revealed by Norwegian media prior to the court ruling that Merete Hodne was once a member of the anti-Islam group PEGIDA. Bayan, who has since changed her name to Charlotte Faviano, revealed to Norwegian media in May 2020 that she had been forced to wear the hijab by her abusive ex-husband who in 2017 was sentenced to one year and eight months imprisonment for abusing her over a period of three years.

=== Surveys ===
In a national representative survey from 2012, prepared by the Center for Studies of the Holocaust and Religious Minorities, 66 per cent of those surveyed reported that they would "strongly dislike" (38 per cent) or "dislike" (28 per cent) a Muslim to be married into their family.

== In employment ==
A 2012 study by researchers at the Institutt for Samfunnsforskning found that job applicants with Pakistani-sounding or Muslim-sounding names received 25% less callbacks from employers than true Norwegian applicants given exact similar qualifications and work experience. The observed net discrimination was weaker in females (16%) than males (37,4%). An older 2006 study concluded that Somali and Iraqi immigrants faced the most discrimination of any immigrant group in the labor market and housing.

== In education ==
Research by the Institutt for Samfunnsforskning in 2014 concluded that the coverage of Islam and Muslims in Norway in an academic setting further negative societal attitudes.

In June 2018, Norway's parliament voted to ban the burqa and niqab in schools, nurseries and universities. This makes it one of ten European countries to restrict the religious attire of Muslim women.

== In politics ==
In August 2014, MP Ulf Leirstein (then Progress Party, now independent) was criticized for making reference to the Eurabia conspiracy theory in reference to immigration. Leirstein also accused Muslim MP Hadia Tajik (Labour Party) of supporting ISIS and practicing taqiyya. Vice Chairman of the Progress Party, MP Per Sandberg, defended Leirstein's statements as "freedom of expression."

Following a March 2017 ruling by the European Court of Human Rights upholding the ban on headscarves at work, former leader of the Progress Party, Carl I. Hagen, expressed support for banning municipality employees in Oslo from wearing "political, religious or philosophical symbols at work", including the hijab. Councillor Tone Tellevik Dahl (Labour Party) rejected the suggestion.

== In the media ==
The Convention Against All Forms of Racial Discrimination raised concerns in 2015 about an "increase in... [hate] speech and xenophobic discourse by politicians, in the media and in other public platforms" in Norway.

== In the justice system ==
The Norwegian government has been criticized by the European Council's European Commission Against Racism and Intolerance, the United Nations' Convention Against All Forms of Racial Discrimination Commission, and the Norwegian Equality and Anti-Discrimination Ombud for a lack of sustained efforts against hate speech. The first ever sentence against a Norwegian citizen for hate speech targeting a Muslim was in October 2014. Norwegian Muslims interviewed for a newspaper report in Aftenposten about this issue in August 2015 asserted that "Muslims do not report hate crimes" since they had "no confidence in the police taking it seriously."

== Hate crimes ==
In 1985 the Ahmadiyya Muslim Nor mosque at Frogner in Oslo was blasted with dynamite. A woman of 38 suffered from smoke inhalation. The bomb was detonated by an activist from the National People's Party, which resulted in several other people from the party being arrested by the police.

In May 2016 a woman was caught on camera trying to set fire to a mosque in Oslo, having been allowed into the building by asking to use its lavatory.

In February 2015, three men were charged with racist-motivated violence against two Norwegian Kurds in downtown Oslo. The perpetrators allegedly yelled "Fucking Muslims, you don't have anything to do here" and "Go back, fucking terrorists" while kicking and punching the victims in their heads and bodies. Two of the perpetrators had ties to neo-Nazi groups in Norway.

On 10 August 2019 21 year old lone gunman Philip Manshaus opened fire on a mosque in Bærum, Norway, a suburbia 20 kilometers outside of Oslo. He injured one person and was then subdued by two worshippers. At the time of the shooting there were three congregants in the mosque before the gunman opened fire on the Al Noor Islamic center of Bærum. Before the incident he killed his adopted stepsister at their home and posted on 4chan ten minutes prior to the failed attack, praising the Christchurch shooter, the Poway synagogue shooter and the El Paso shooter. In June 2020 the two worshippers who prevented the attack, Muhammad Rafiq and Mohammad Iqbal, were awarded the Medal for Heroic Deeds. Manshaus was sentenced to 21 years in prison a few days earlier.

== Organizations ==
=== Fedrelandet viktigst ===
Fedrelandet viktigst is a Facebook group for Norwegians opposed to immigration. The group was mocked after it posted a picture of empty bus seats, which it had mistaken for burka-clad women. Users in the group claimed it represented the "Islamification" of Norway. Rune Berglund Steen, the leader of the Norwegian Centre Against Racism, said the irrational response to six empty bus seats demonstrates that "people see what they want to see and what they want to see are dangerous Muslims."

=== Norwegian Defence League ===
The Norwegian Defense League is an anti-Islamic group closely associated with the English Defence League (EDL). The NDL is an offshoot of the European Defence League and was formed around New Year 2010/2011, inspired by the EDL which had been formed in 2009. There were conflicts regarding the leadership of the group, and it was immersed in a struggle involving multiple competing factions in early 2011. The group was eventually led by Lena Andreassen for about a month until she was dismissed by EDL appointed liaison officer Steve Simmons following a failed demonstration that was held on 9 April 2011. The NDL has been headed by a board of administrators since then, and one of its leading figures has been Ronny Alte. Alte said that the group is not far-right or racist and that the NDL seeks to gather people of all races to fight for democracy and freedom of speech, which he said is threatened by "the ideology Islam." He also said that the group is not anti-Islam, but Islam-critical. Alte resigned abruptly both as leader and member of the NDL on 19 April 2012 over a dispute with the rest of the organisation's leadership related to its connection with Anders Behring Breivik.

=== Stop Islamisation of Norway ===
Stop Islamisation of Norway is a Norwegian organisation which was established in 2008, although its history goes back to a group started in 2000. Its stated aim is to work against Islam, which it defines as a totalitarian political ideology that violates the Norwegian Constitution as well as democratic and human values. The organisation is led by Arne Tumyr, who claimed a member count of about 3000 people in a 2011 interview. While the group claims to solely criticize religion, it has been accused of promoting stigmatization, exclusion, and discrimination towards Norwegian Muslims.

== Opposition ==
The Norwegian Centre Against Racism and the Organisation Against Public Discrimination work to counter what they view as discriminatory attitudes and ideas. The Lutheran State Church in Norway encourages interfaith dialogue and relations with Norwegian Muslims. The Church also has contacts with the Islamic Council Norway.

== See also ==
- Antisemitism in contemporary Norway
- Racism in Norway
- Islam in Norway

== Sources ==
- Bangstad, Sindre (2016). "Islamophobia in the Norway National Report 2015" (PDF). European Islamophobia Report. Istanbul, Turkey: Foundation for Political, Economic and Social Research.
