= History of the Jews in Norway =

Norwegian Jews Norske Jøder יהודים נורבגים
Total population
- 770

Regions with significant populations
- Oslo, Trondheim

Languages
- Norwegian, Hebrew, Yiddish

Religion
- Judaism

Related ethnic groups
- Swedish Jews, Finnish Jews, Danish Jews, other Ashkenazi Jews

The location of Norway (dark green) in Europe

The history of Jews in Norway dates back to the 1400s. Although there were very likely Jewish merchants, sailors and others who entered Norway during the Middle Ages, no efforts were made to establish a Jewish community. Through the early modern period, Norway, still devastated by the Black Death, was ruled by Denmark from 1536 to 1814 and then by Sweden until 1905. In 1687, Christian V rescinded all Jewish privileges, specifically banning Jews from Norway, except with a special dispensation. Jews found in the kingdom were jailed and expelled, and this ban persisted until 1851.

In 1814, when Norway gained independence from Denmark, the general ban against Jews entering the country was "continued" in the new Norwegian Constitution. Sephardim were exempt from the ban, but it appears that few applied for a letter of free passage. After tireless efforts by the poet Henrik Wergeland, politician Peder Jensen Fauchald, school principal Hans Holmboe and others, in 1851 the Norwegian parliament (the Stortinget) lifted the ban against Jews and they were awarded religious rights on a par with Christian dissenters.

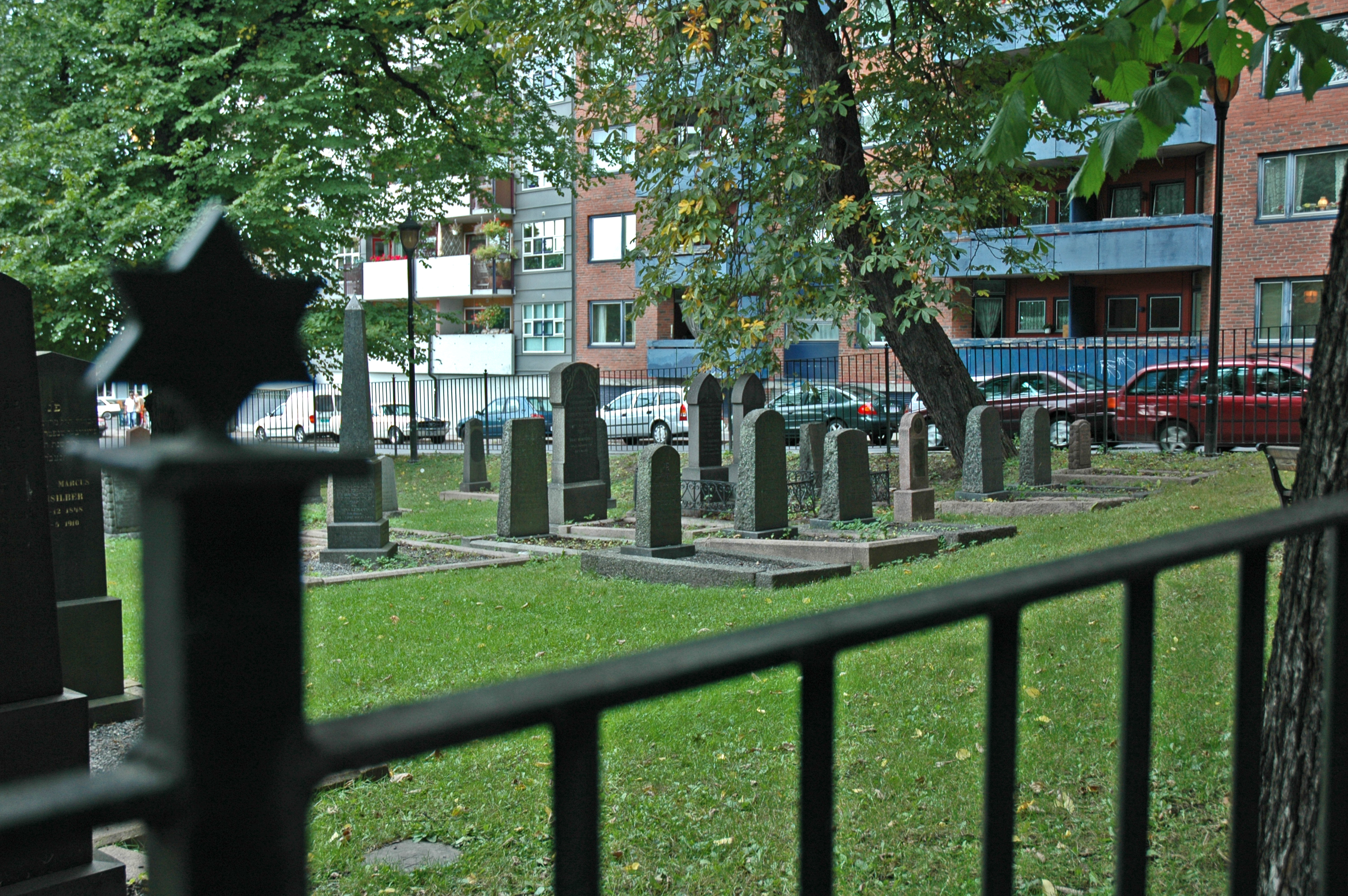
Jewish cemetery in Sofienberg, Oslo

The first Jewish community in Norway was established in Oslo in 1892. The community grew slowly until World War II. It was bolstered by refugees in the late 1930s and peaked at about 2,100. The population was devastated during the Holocaust, in which a significant portion of the Norwegian Jewish community was murdered by Nazi Germany. Jews remain one of Norway's smallest ethnic and religious minorities.

== Middle Ages ==
The first mention of Jews in Norse literature is found in Postola sögur in Iceland in the 13th century, where they are mentioned along with the more general pagans. The literature of this time referred to Jews as gyðingar, juði, or in the Latin form judeus. Jews were also mentioned in unfavorable terms in subsequent literary Icelandic sagas, such as Gyðinga saga (Saga of the Jews).

However, there are sources that dispute antisemitism in Norway in the Middle Ages for the simple reason that there was no evidence of the presence of Jews in the country. A comprehensive study of contemporaneous documents, for instance, such as testaments, contracts, and legal cases among other primary data did not mention Jews or a Jewish community in Norway. Scholars cited that those mentioned in Church documents can be considered "virtual Jews" in the sense that the citations were indirect and that these mentions were probably symbols of non-Christian behavior.

== Reformation and Enlightenment ==
In 1436 and again in 1438, Archbishop Aslak Bolt prohibited celebrating a day of rest on Saturday, lest Christians replicate the "way of Jews," and this prohibition was reinforced through several subsequent ordinances, including those in Diplomatarium Norvegicum.

The first known settlement of Jews on Norway territory was based on a royal dispensation. The first known mention of Jews in public documents relates to the admissibility of Sephardim, Spanish and Portuguese Jews who had been expelled from Spain in 1492 and from Portugal in 1497. Some of these were given special dispensation to enter Norway.

While Norway was union with Denmark from 1537 to 1814, Denmark-Norway introduced a number of religious restrictions both to uphold the Protestant Reformation in general and against Jews in particular. In 1569, Fredrik II ordered that all foreigners in Denmark-Norway had to affirm their commitment to 25 articles of faith central to Lutheranism, on pain of deportation, forfeiture of all property, and death.

The earliest recorded direct mention of Jews occurred in documents published in the 17th century when a group of Portuguese Jews were allowed to settle in Norway. Restrictions were lifted for Sephardic Jews already established as merchants in Altona when Christian IV took over the town. Christian also issued the first letter of safe passage to a Jew (Albert Dionis) in 1619, and on June 19, 1630, general amnesty was granted to all Jews permanently in residence in Glückstadt, including the right to travel freely throughout the kingdom.

In this condition, the existence of antisemitism can be considered negligible because the traditional Jewish prejudice often stemmed from the perception that the Jews controlled the economic, political and social spheres of a specific European society. However, this argument's attempt to downplay antisemitism is internally contradictory, since that perception of Jews is itself one of the most prominent and enduring signs of antisemitism.

Public policy toward Jews varied over the next several hundred years. The kings generally tolerated Jewish merchants, investors, and bankers whose contributions of benefit to the economy of Denmark-Norway on the one hand, while seeking to restrict their movements, residence, and presence in public life. Several Jews, particularly in the Sephardic Teixeira family, but also some of Ashkenazi origins, were given letters of passage to visit places in Denmark and Norway; but there were also several incidents of Jews who were arrested, imprisoned, fined, and deported for violating the general ban against their presence, even when they claimed the exemption granted to Sephardim. Christian IV of Denmark-Norway gave Jews limited rights to travel within the kingdom and, in 1641, Ashkenazi Jews were given equivalent rights. Christian V rescinded these privileges in 1687, specifically banning Jews from Norway, unless they were given a special dispensation. Jews found in the kingdom were jailed and expelled, and this ban persisted until 1851.

The European Enlightenment led to moderate easing of restrictions for Jews in Denmark-Norway, especially in Denmark's southern areas and cities. Some Jewish families that had converted to Christianity settled in Norway. Writers of the time increased their interest in the Jewish people, including Ludvig Holberg, who figured Jews as comical figures in most of his plays and in 1742 wrote The Jewish History From the Beginning of the World, Continued till Present Day, presenting Jews to some extent in conventional, unfavorable stereotypes, but also raising the question about mistreatment of Jews in Europe.

Consequently, as stereotypes against Jews started entering the awareness of the general public during the Enlightenment, there were also those who rose in opposition to some, if not all, of the underlying hostility. Lutheran minister Niels Hertzberg was one of those who wrote against Norwegian prejudice, ultimately influencing the later votes on the constitutional amendment to allow Jews to settle in Norway.

== Constitutional ban ==
There was a blanket ban on Jewish presence in Norway since 1687, except with a special dispensation, and Jews found in the kingdom were jailed and expelled. The ban persisted until 1851. Based on short-lived hopes that Denmark's concessions at the Treaty of Kiel in 1814 would allow for Norwegian independence, a constituent assembly was convened in Eidsvoll in the spring of 1814. Although Denmark had only a few months earlier completely lifted all restrictions on Jews, the Norwegian assembly, after some debate, went the other way, and Jews were to "continue" to be excluded from the realm, as part of the clause that made Lutheranism the official state religion, though with free exercise of religion as the general rule. The ban was against Jews and Jesuits entering the country. Sephardim were exempt from the ban, but it appears that few applied for a letter of free passage. On 4 November 1844, the Norwegian Ministry of Justice declared: "…it is assumed that the so-called Portuguese Jews are, regardless of the Constitution's §2, entitled to dwell in this country, which is also, to [our] knowledge, what has hitherto been assumed."

Several of the framers had formulated views on Jews before the convention had started, among them Lauritz Weidemann, who wrote that "The Jewish nation's history proves, that this people always has been rebellious and deceitful, and their religious teachings, the hope of again arising as a nation, so often they have acquired some remarkable fortune, led them to intrigues and to create a state within a state. It is of vital importance to the security of the state that an absolute exception be made about them."

Those who supported the continued ban did so for several reasons, among them theological prejudice. Nicolai Wergeland and Georg Sverdrup felt that it would be incompatible with Judaism to deal honestly with Christians, writing that "no person of the Jewish faith may come within Norway's borders, far less reside there." Peter Motzfeld also supported the ban, but on the slightly different basis that the Jewish identity was too strong to allow for full citizenship. Other prominent framers, such as Hans Christian Ulrik Midelfart spoke "beautifully" in defense of the Jews, and also Johan Caspar Herman Wedel-Jarlsberg expressed in more muted terms the backwardness of the proposition.

Those who opposed admission of Jews prevailed decisively when the matter was put to a vote, and the second paragraph of constitution read:

§ 2. The evangelical-Lutheran religion remains the State's public religion. Those inhabitants who profess to it, are obliged to raise their children in the same. Jesuits and monastic orders may not be tolerated. Jews remain excluded from admission to the kingdom.

This effectively maintained the legal status quo from about 1813 but put Norway sharply at odds with trends in both Denmark and Sweden, where laws and decrees in the early 19th century were granting Jews greater, not more limited liberties.

Meanwhile, a small number of Jewish converts to Christianity had settled in Norway, some of them rising to prominence. Among them were Ludvig Mariboe, Edvard Isak Hambro, and Heinrich Glogau. In 1817, Glogau had challenged Christian Magnus Falsen, one of the proponents of the ban against Jews at the constitutional assembly about the meaning of the prohibition, asking whether he should be embarrassed by his ancestors or his homeland when relating his legacy to his children. Falsen responded by asserting that Judaism "carries nothing but ridicule and contempt toward the person that does not profess to it...making it a duty for each Jew to destroy [all nations that accept him]."

Indeed, a number of Jews who found themselves in Norway were fined and deported. A ship bound for England foundered off the west coast of Norway in 1817, and one of those who washed ashore was Michael Jonas, a Polish Jew. He was escorted out of the country under heavy guard. This heavy-handed approach caused consternation, and the chief of police in Bergen was ordered to personally pay for the costs of the deportation. There were also deportation proceedings against suspected Jews who could not produce a baptismal certificate, among them the singer Carl Friedrich Coppello (alias Meyer Marcus Koppel), opticians Martin Blumenbach and Henri Leia, Moritz Lichtenheim, and others.

== Repeal and initial immigration ==
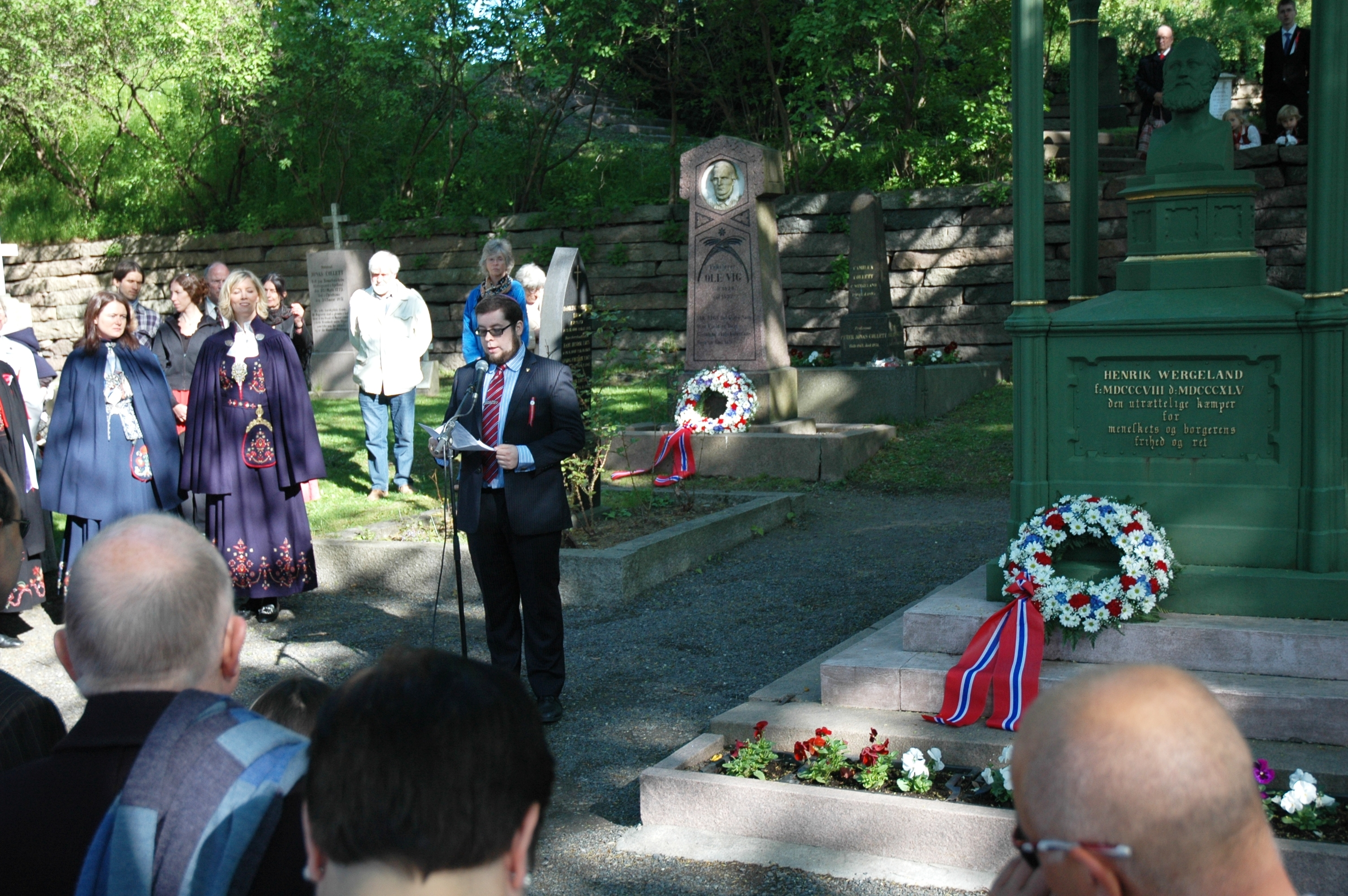
Every year the Jewish community of Norway commemorates Henrik Wergeland, the driving force behind the repeal of the ban

The deportation of Jews who had either come to Norway by accident or in good faith caused some embarrassment among Norwegians. The first who advocated for a repeal was the poet Andreas Munch in 1836. But it was Henrik Wergeland who became the leading champion for the Jews in Norway.

=== 10th parliamentary session, 1842 ===
Henrik Wergeland was the son of Nikolai Wergeland, one of the members at the constitutional assembly who had most strongly objected to admitting Jews to the country. The younger Wergeland had long harbored prejudice against Jews, but travels in Europe had changed his mind. He published the pamphlet Indlæg i Jødesagen on August 26, 1841, arguing passionately for a repeal of the clause. On February 19, 1842, his efforts to put the matter to a vote in the Norwegian parliament was successful, when the proposition was referred to the Constitution Committee. On September 9, 1842, the motion to repeal won a simple majority: 51 to 43, but, falling short of a supermajority (2/3) it failed.

On October 26, 1842, Wergeland published his book Jødesagen i det norske Storthing ("The Jewish issue in the Norwegian parliament"), which in addition to arguing for the cause also provides interesting insights into the workings of the parliament at the time.

=== Parliamentary sessions in 1845, 1848, and 1851 ===
Wergeland had submitted a new proposal to parliament later on the same day that the first repeal had failed. He died on July 12, 1845. The constitution committee referred their recommendation to repeal exactly a month after his death, on August 12. Several versions were put to vote, but the most popular version won 52 votes to repeal, only 47 to keep; worse than the last vote.

In 1848, the motion to repeal earned 59 to 43 votes, still falling short of the 2/3 required. In 1851, finally, the clause was repealed with 93 votes to 10. On September 10, all remaining legislation related to the ban was repealed by the passage of "Lov om Ophævelse af det hidtil bestaaende Forbud mot at Jøder indfinde sig i Riget m.v." ("Law regarding the repeal of the hitherto permanent prohibition against Jews in the realm, etc.")

== Early 20th century media, public opinion and policy ==
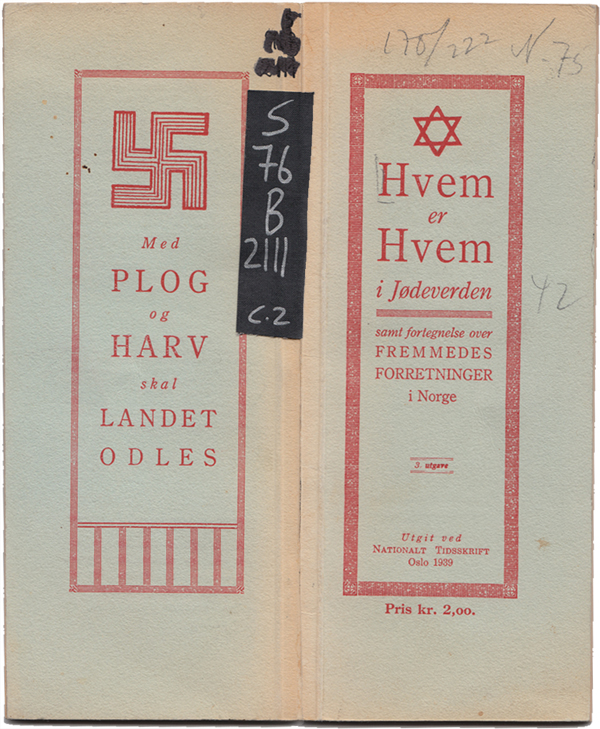
Who's Who in the Jewish World. An attache to antisemitic periodical Nationalt Tidsskrift listing Jews and presumed Jews in Norway. First edition was printed in 1925.

In spite of fears that Norway would be overwhelmed by Jewish immigration following the repeal, only about 25 Jews immigrated to Norway before 1870. Because of pogroms in Czarist Russia, however, the immigration accelerated somewhat in the late 19th and early 20th centuries. By 1910, there were about 1,000 Jews in Norway.

Though the minority was small and widely dispersed, several stereotypes of Jews gained currency in the Norwegian press and popular literature in the early 20th century. In books by the widely read authors Rudolf Muus and Øvre Richter Frich, Jews are described as sadistic and obsessed with money. The attorney Eivind Saxlund published a pamphlet Jøder og Gojim ("Jews and Goyim") in 1910, which was characterized in 1922 as "antisemitic smut literature' by a writer in Dagbladet. Saxlund sued for libel and lost, but earned the admiration of the newspaper Nationen, who praised Saxlund for fighting "our race war." In 1920, The Protocols of the Elders of Zion was published in Norway under the title Den nye verdenskeiser ("The New World Emperor").

In 1916 Norwegian writer Mikal Sylten published an antisemitic periodical called Nationalt Tidsskrift. In 1917 he started using the Swastika as its symbol, several years before Adolf Hitler. The periodical was of a racist nature and published Antisemitic conspiracy theories. The periodical declared itself as the "only Norwegian journal that studies in depth Jewish true ties to events in the world and here at home" . An attache called Who's Who in the Jewish World was printed four editions starting 1925. This pamphlet contained a list of Jews and presumed Jews in Norway, sorted by occupation. Housewives and children were listed under Different Occupations. Sylten was tried for his collaboration with the Nazis during the German occupation in the legal purge in Norway after World War II.

== Shechita controversy ==
Prejudice against Jews became a focal point in the controversy about the legality of shechita, the Jewish practice of ritual slaughter. The issue had originally been raised in the 1890s, but a municipal ban on the practice in 1913 in Oslo brought the matter to national attention.

=== Early opposition ===
Efforts to ban shechita put well-intended humane society activists in league with antisemitic individuals. In particular, Jonas Søhr, a senior police official, took a particular interest and eventually rose to the leadership of the Norwegian Federation for Animal Protection, while also opposing admission of Jewish refugees during World War I. The animal rights cause was used as a means to attack not just the method of slaughter, but also the community itself.

Those opposing the ban included Fridtjof Nansen, but the division on the issue crossed party lines in all mainstream parties, except the Agrarian Party (today, the Centre Party), which was consistent in its opposition to schechita. During the 1890s, protests were raised in the Norwegian press against the practice of shechita, on the grounds that it was cruel to animals. The Jewish community responded to these objections by stating that the method was humane.

A committee commissioned on 11 February 1927 consulted numerous experts and visited a slaughterhouse in Copenhagen. Its majority favored a ban and found support in the Department of Agriculture and the parliamentary agriculture committee. Those who opposed a ban spoke of religious tolerance, and also found that schechita was no more inhumane than other slaughter methods. Ingvar Svanberg writes that many of the arguments against shechita were based "on the distrust of 'foreign' habits" and "often contained anti-Semitic elements". C. J. Hambro was one of those most appalled by the antisemitic invective, noting that "where animal rights are protected to an exaggerated extent, it usually is done with the help of human sacrifice".

=== 1929 ban ===
The controversy continued until 1929, when the Norwegian parliament banned the practice of slaughtering animals which have not been first stunned or paralyzed. The ban remains in force today.

No forms of religious slaughter are named as being banned in the Norwegian legislation. Norwegian law requires that animals be stunned before being slaughtered, without exception for religious practices, which is incompatible with shechita. The Norwegian Islamic Council, on the other hand, has found that sedation is compatible with halal rules, provided that the animal's heart is still beating at the time of slaughter.

=== Continued debate ===
The former chief rabbi of Norway, Michael Melchior, argued that antisemitism is one motive for the bans: "I won't say this is the only motivation, but it's certainly no coincidence that one of the first things Nazi Germany forbade was kosher slaughter. I also know that during the original debate on this issue in Norway, where shechitah has been banned since 1930, one of the parliamentarians said straight out, 'If they don't like it, let them go live somewhere else.'"

Representatives of both Muslim and Jewish communities, citing scientific studies, dispute the assertion that traditional halal and kosher slaughtering methods lead to unnecessary animal suffering. Norway's acceptance of hunting, whaling and sealing were also raised as proof of the alleged hypocrisy of the Norwegian position. Minister of Agriculture, Lars Peder Brekk of the Centre Party (which has always rejected shechita, see above), rejected the comparison.

Proponents of the continued ban, including officials from the Norwegian Food Safety Authority claimed that animals slaughtered according to shechita were conscious for "several minutes" after they were slaughtered, and writer and farmer Tore Stubberud claimed that animals in Judaism had "no moral status... pure objects for ... archaic, religious needs", and wondered whether the EU, in allowing for such slaughter had become "purely a bank, without values".

To get around the ban, kosher meat has had to be imported into the country. In June 2019, it was proposed to extend the ban to imports of kosher meat. The proposal has also been described as antisemitic.

== Holocaust ==
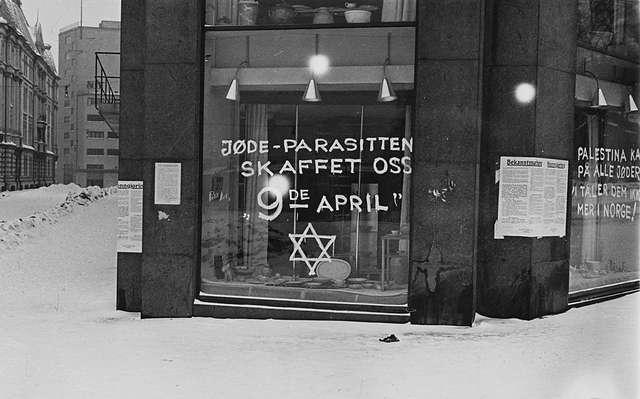
Antisemitic graffiti on shop windows in Oslo in 1941. The graffiti at the forefront reads "The Jew parasite got us 9 April" while the graffiti to the side reads "Palestine calls for all Jews. We don't stand them anymore in Norway."

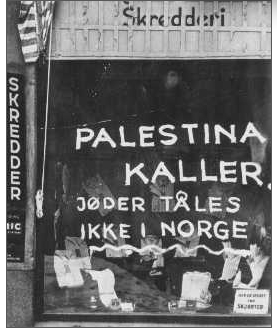
Antisemitic graffiti on a Jewish-owned tailor shop in Oslo, 1942, reading "Palestine calls, Jews are not tolerated in Norway."

Niels Christian Ditleff was a Norwegian diplomat who in the late 1930s was posted to Warsaw, Poland. In the spring of 1939, Ditleff set up a transit station in Warsaw for Jewish refugees from Czechoslovakia that had been sent there through the sponsorship of Nansenhjelpen. Ditleff arranged for the refugees to receive food, clothing, and transportation to Gdynia, Poland, where they boarded ships bound for Norway. Nansenhjelpen was a Norwegian humanitarian organization founded by Odd Nansen in 1936 to provide safe haven and assistance in Norway for Jewish refugees from areas in Europe under Nazi control. The sanctuary in Norway was only short lived.

Nazi Germany invaded Norway on 9 April 1940, and a number of Norwegians were immediately arrested, and two months later the occupying force established the first prisoners' camp at Ulven, outside Bergen. Many Jews who could, fled the country. "Nearly two-thirds of the Jews in Norway fled from Norway". Of these, around 900 Jews were smuggled out of the country by the Norwegian resistance movement, mostly to Sweden but some also to the United Kingdom. In 1942, before deportations started, there were at least 2,173 Jews in Norway. Of these, 1,643 were Norwegian citizens, 240 were foreign citizens, and 290 were stateless. At least 765 Jews died in German hands; more than half of the Norwegians who died. Only between 28 and 34 of those deported survived their continued imprisonment in camps (following their deportation) – and around 25 (of these) returned to Norway after the war.

During the War, the civilian Norwegian police (politiet) in many cases helped the German occupiers to arrest those Jews who failed to escape in time. In the middle of the occupation of Norway by Nazi Germany, there were at least 2,173 Jews in Norway. Records show that during the Holocaust, 758 Norwegian Jews were murdered by the Nazis — mostly in Auschwitz. In addition, at least 775 Jews were arrested, detained, and/or deported. Most of the Jews who survived did so by fleeing the country, mostly to Sweden, but some also to the United Kingdom. The Jews fleeing to Sweden were in many cases assisted by the Norwegian resistance, but sometimes had to pay guides. A few also survived in camps in Norway or in hospitals, or in hiding. All Jews in Norway were either deported and murdered, were imprisoned, had fled to Sweden, or were in hiding by 27 November 1942. Many of the Jews who fled during the War did not return and, in 1946, there were only 559 Jews left in Norway. Between 1947 and 1949, the Norwegian government gave permission for 500 displaced persons to live in the country, although many later left for Israel, Canada, or the United States. About 800 Norwegian Jews who had fled to Sweden returned. By the mid-1950s, about 1,000 Jews resided in Norway, of whom 700 lived in Oslo and 150 in Trondheim.

Forty-one Norwegians have been recognized by Yad Vashem as being Righteous Among the Nations, as well as the Norwegian resistance movement collectively.

== 1990s: World War II restitution ==
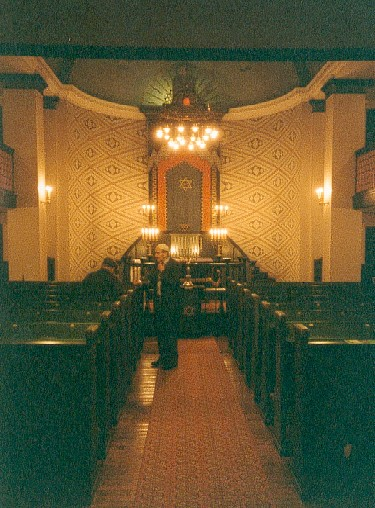
Sanctuary of the synagogue in Trondheim

In March 1996, the Norwegian government appointed a Committee "to establish what happened to Jewish property during World War II … and to determine to what extent seized assets/property was restored after the War."

In June 1997, the Committee delivered a divided report, split into a majority and a minority:

- the majority view of uncovered losses was estimated to be 108 million Norwegian krone (kr), based on the value of the krone in May 1997 (≈US$15 million).
- the minority view of uncovered losses was estimated to be 330 million kr.

On 15 May 1998, the Prime Minister of Norway, Kjell Magne Bondevik, proposed 450 million kr, covering both a 'collective' and an 'individual' restitution. On 11 March 1999, the Stortinget voted to accept the proposition for 450 million kr. The collective part, totaling 250 million kr, was divided into three:

- Funds to sustain the Jewish community in Norway (150 million kr).
- Support for development, outside Norway, of the traditions and culture which the Nazis wished to exterminate, to be distributed by a foundation where the executive committee members are to be appointed one each by the Norwegian Government, the Norwegian Parliament, the Jewish community in Norway, and the World Jewish Congress/World Jewish Restitution Organization. Eli Wiesel was suggested to lead the executive committee (60 million kr).
- The formation of a national museum for tolerance, established as the Norwegian Center for Studies of Holocaust and Religious Minorities (40 million kr).

The individual part was estimated to total not more than 200 million kr, as compensation to individuals and their survivors, with a maximum of 200,000 kr each. By 31 November 1999, the last date for individuals to apply for compensation, 980 people had received 200,000 kr (≈US$26,000) each, totaling 196 million kr (≈US$25 million).

However, Norwegian estate law imposes estate tax on inheritance passing from the deceased to his/her heirs depending on the relationship between the two. This tax was compounded at each step of inheritance. As no death certificates had been issued for Jews murdered in German concentration camps, the deceased were listed as missing. Their estates were held in probate pending a declaration of death and charged for administrative expenses. So, by the time all these factors had their effect on the valuation of the confiscated assets, very little was left. In total, 7.8 million kr was awarded to principals and heirs of Jewish property confiscated by the Nazis. This was less than the administrative fees charged by governmental agencies for probate. It did not include assets seized by the government that belonged to non-Norwegian citizens, and that of citizens that left no legal heirs. This last category was formidable, as 230 entire Jewish households were killed during the course of the Holocaust.

== Contemporary situation ==
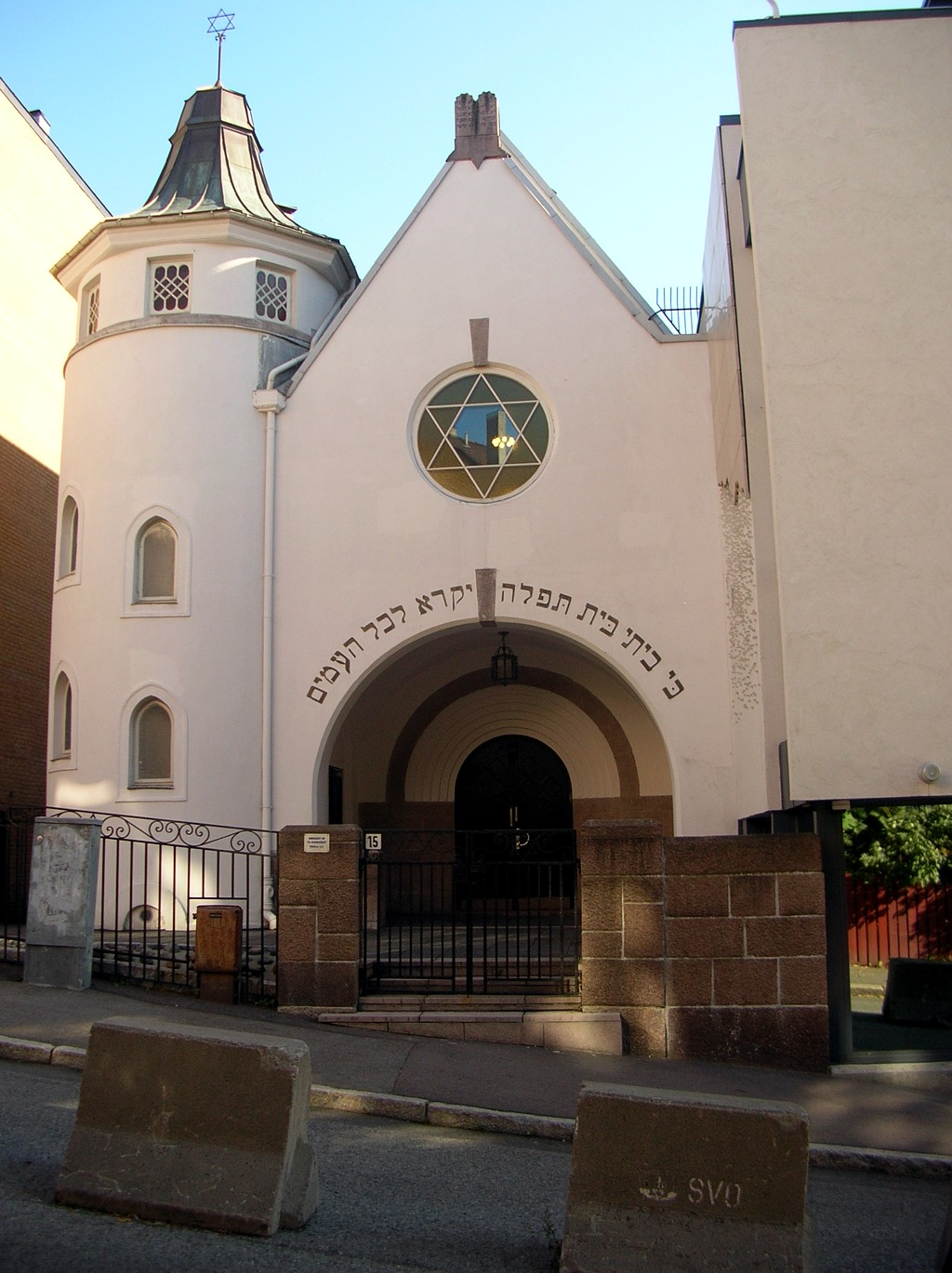
Exterior of the synagogue in Oslo, note concrete barriers

As of 1 January 2012, there were about 1,500 Jewish people living in the country as a whole. The number of registered members in religious Jewish communities has been declining in recent years, and was 747 in 2015. Most of these were based in Oslo.

There are two synagogues in Norway, one in Oslo and one in Trondheim. The Oslo Synagogue runs a full cradle-to-grave range of facilities, including a kindergarten and cheder. They both also have an outreach program to gather still functioning groups in Bergen and Stavanger. In June 2004, Chabad-Lubavitch established a permanent presence in Oslo, also organising activities in other parts of Norway. Oslo also has a Jewish renewal rabbi who organises services and activities. There was a Society for Progressive Judaism in Oslo, which no longer exists. The Jewish community in Norway is represented by Det Mosaiske Trossamfund (The Mosaic Community), which is affiliated with the World Jewish Congress. Other Jewish organizations in Norway include B'nai B'rith, WIZO, B’nei Akiva, Keren Kayemet, Help the Jews Home (Hjelp Jødene Hjem), a Kosher Meals on Wheels, Jewish study circles, and a home for the elderly. There is also a Jewish community center in Trondheim.

Norwegian Jews are well integrated into Norwegian society, and prominent among them were Jo Benkow, a former president of the Stortinget; Leo Eitinger and Berthold Grünfeld, both notable psychiatrists; Robert Levin, the pianist; writer, actress and theater critic Mona Levin and Bente Kahan, an actress and singer. Of these, only the last two are still living.

== Antisemitism in Norway ==
The mainstream Norwegian political environment has strongly adopted a platform that rejects antisemitism. However, individuals often privately hold antisemitic views.

There have been episodes of vandalization of the Oslo Synagogue. In July 2006, during the 2006 Lebanon War, the congregation issued an advisory warning Jews not to wear kippot or other identifying items in public for fear of harassment or assault.

On 17 September 2006, the Oslo Synagogue was attacked with an automatic weapon, only days after it was made public that the building had been the planned target for the Algerian terror group GSPC that had been plotting a bombing campaign in the Norwegian capital. On 2 June 2008, Arfan Qadeer Bhatti was convicted for the shooting attack and given an eight-year preventive custody sentence for serious vandalism. The Oslo city court judge could not find sufficient evidence that the shots fired at the synagogue amounted to a terrorist act. The synagogue in Oslo is now under continuous surveillance and protected by barriers.

In August 2006, the writer Jostein Gaarder published an op-ed in Aftenposten, titled God's Chosen People. It was highly critical of Israel, as well as Judaism as a religion. Allegations of antisemitism and an intense public debate resulted in the Jostein Gaarder controversy.

In December 2008, Imre Hercz filed a complaint to the Norwegian Press Complaints Commission against Otto Jespersen, a comedian who mocked the Holocaust, but fellow comics and his TV station backed the performer. Jespersen joked on national television in his weekly routine that "I would like to take the opportunity to remember all the billions of fleas and lice that lost their lives in German gas chambers, without having done anything wrong other than settling on persons of Jewish background." Jespersen also presented a satirical monologue on antisemitism that ended with, "Finally, I would like to wish all Norwegian Jews a Merry Christmas – no, what am I saying! You don't celebrate Christmas, do you!? It was you who crucified Jesus," on 4 December. Jespersen has received criticism for several of his attacks on social and ethnic groups as well as royalty, politicians and celebrities, and in defence of the monologue TV 2 noted that Jespersen attacks in all directions, and that "if you should take [the monologue] seriously, there are more than just the Jews that should feel offended".

In 2010, the Norwegian Broadcasting Corporation reported that antisemitism was common among Norwegian Muslims. Teachers at schools with large shares of Muslims reported that Muslim students often "praise or admire Adolf Hitler for his killing of Jews", that "Jew-hate is legitimate within vast groups of Muslim students" and that "Muslims laugh or command [teachers] to stop when trying to educate about the Holocaust". One Jewish father also told how his child had been taken after school by a Muslim mob, "to be taken out to the forest and hanged because he was a Jew". (The child escaped.) In February 2015, however, a group of young Muslims organised 1,500 people to form two 'rings of peace' around the synagogues in Oslo and Bergen in response to recent terror attacks against Jewish centers in Europe.

Unconnected with Norwegian Muslims, antisemitic graffiti was sprayed on a school and sports facility in Skien in August 2014. Later that year, a swastika was carved into the glass doors of the Trøndelag Theater, the day after the premiere of a Jewish puppet theater performance. In October 2014, a Jewish cemetery was vandalized in Trondheim, with sprayed marks and the word 'Führer' scribbled on the chapel.

An article published by the Jerusalem Center for Public Affairs stated that antisemitism in Norway comes mainly from the leadership – politicians, organization leaders, church leaders, and senior journalists. Despite dissenting opinions, it claims that antisemitism in Europe originated in Muslim immigration, this essay blames the European-Christian leadership for antisemitism that began around 1000 CE, centuries before Jews came to Norway. Another issue arising from the article is the publishing of antisemitic caricatures. Since the 1970s, many pro-Palestinian caricatures have been published in the Norwegian media. But a comparison of those depictions with antisemitic caricatures from the Nazi-era show some similarities. Common motifs such as 'Jews are evil and inhuman', 'Jews rule and exploit the world' and 'Jews hate peace and propagate wars' are repeated in more recently published drawings, as well as in antisemitic sketches from the beginning of the twentieth century.

According to an ADL telephone survey of 501 people, 15% (+/-4.4%) of the adult population in Norway harbor antisemitic attitudes and 40% of the population agree with the statement, "Jews are more loyal to Israel than to Norway", and 31% think that, "Jews still talk too much about what happened to them in the Holocaust." However, this survey has been criticized for being unreasonably simplistic in its classification of "harboring antisemitic attitudes".

== See also ==
- Trondheim Synagogue
- Jewish Museum in Oslo
- Oslo Synagogue
- The Holocaust in Norway
- Chabad

== Bibliography ==
- Mendelsohn, Oskar (1969). Jødenes historie i Norge gjennom 300 år: Bind 1 1660–1940 (in Norwegian). Vol. 1. Universitetsforlaget. ISBN 82-00-02523-3.
- Mendelsohn, Oskar (1986). Jødenes historie i Norge gjennom 300 år: Bind 2 1940–1985 (in Norwegian). Vol. 2. Universitetsforlaget. ISBN 978-82-0002524-5.
- Saa, Ann, ed. (2003). Jewish Life and Culture in Norway: Wergeland's legacy. New York: Abel Abrahmsen. ISBN 0-9744601-0-9.
- Westlie, Bjørn: Oppgjør: I skyggen av holocaust. 2002. (The story behind the 1997 commission)
- Reitan, Jon (2005). Jødene fra Trondheim (in Norwegian). Trondheim: Tapir akademisk forlag. ISBN 82-519-2044-2.
- Reisel, Micha, ed. (1992). Du skal fortelle det til dine barn: Det mosaiske trossamfund i Oslo 1892–1992 (in Norwegian). Oslo: Det mosaiske trossamfund i Oslo. ISBN 82-992611-0-4.
- Brekke, Torkel (2023). Ingen er uskyldig: Antisemittisme på venstresiden. Cappelen Damm. ISBN 9788202757212.
