= God's chosen people (Jostein Gaarder op-ed) =

In August 2006, author Jostein Gaarder sparked a controversy in Norway after publishing an op-ed "God's chosen people" in the Aftenposten, one of the country's major newspapers, in which he produced scathing criticism of Israel which at the time was engaged in the 2006 Lebanon War. He called, among other things, for the world to stop recognizing the State of Israel, just like it, according to him, had not recognized the Taliban regime in Afghanistan or the Apartheid regime in South Africa. The name of the op-ed alludes to the concept of "chosenness" in Judaism.

The text was perceived by scholars such as Yehuda Bauer and Shimon Samuels of the Simon Wiesenthal Center as deeply antisemitic.

Subsequently Gaarder clarified his views on Israel. Specifically, he said that he does not question Israel's right to exist, "but not as an apartheid state". Gaarder repeatedly dismissed suggestions that his article was anti-Semitic.

In 2011, he wrote a new piece in Aftenposten, where he regretted that he had used some thoughtless phrases that could be misinterpreted as anti-Judaistic.

== First op-ed ==
The piece, titled "God's Chosen People" was written in response to the 2006 Lebanon war and claimed that Israel was "a state founded on anti-humanistic principles and on the ruins of an archaic national and warlike religion." The op-ed, which Gaarder, in a 7 August 2006 NRK Channel 2 radio debate said was read by "countless people" and "Middle East experts" prior to publishing, was written in the literary form of a biblical prophecy, believed by some to be inspired by the Book of Amos. Gaarder maintained that the predictions in the piece do not reflect a course of events he would desire, but rather how it might turn out unless Israel changes its political course.

Among other things, Gaarder wrote:

We laugh at this people's whims, and cry over its misdeeds. To act as God's chosen people is not only foolish and arrogant, it is a crime against humanity. We call it racism. […] There are limits to our patience and there are limits to our tolerance. We do not believe in divine promises as a rationale for occupation and apartheid. We have left the Middle Ages behind. We laugh with embarrassment at those who still believe that the god of the flora, fauna and galaxies has chosen one particular people as his favorite, and given them amusing stone tablets, burning bushes and a license to kill.

In the article, Gaarder contrasts the use of religious legitimization of war and occupation with humanistic values, quoting Albert Schweitzer: "Humanitarianism consists of never sacrificing a human being for a cause." The op-ed contrasted Israel with the teachings of Jesus:

We do not recognize the old Kingdom of David as a model for the 21st century map of the Middle East. The Jewish rabbi claimed two thousand years ago that the Kingdom of God is not a martial restoration of the Kingdom of David; the Kingdom of God is within us and amongst us. The Kingdom of God is compassion and forgiveness.

Furthermore, he claimed that many Israelis celebrated the death of Lebanese children, comparing this behavior to the Biblical story where the Israelites celebrated God's plagues against Egypt:

We don't believe that Israel grieves any more for the forty killed Lebanese children than it has wailed over the forty years spent in the desert three thousand years ago. We note that many Israelis celebrate such triumphs in the same manner they once cheered the plagues of the Lord as "fitting punishment" for the people of Egypt.

He stated that "we recognize the State of Israel of 1948 but not that of 1967. It is the state of Israel that fails to recognize, respect, or defer to the internationally lawful Israeli state of 1948. Israel wants more; more water and more villages", adding that Israel already has ceased to exist. He finishes his op-ed by envisioning a future in which the Israelis are the refugees, but hoping that they will be shown mercy:

Peace and free passage for the evacuating, civilian population no longer protected by a State. Shoot not at the fugitives! Take not aim at them! They are vulnerable now—like snails without shells, vulnerable as slow caravans of the Palestinian and Lebanese refugees, defenseless as the women, children and elderly of Qana, Gaza, Sabra and Shatilla. Give the Israeli refugees shelter; give them milk and honey! Let not one Israeli child pay with his life. Far too many children and civilians have already been murdered.

The op-ed was published together with an interview of Gaarder where he explained the thoughts behind the op-ed. When asked about what he wanted to achieve, he answered that he actually wrote it as a wake-up call to Israel. The state of Israel, he says, is the one state not respecting Israel as it was originally "created by the United Nations."

When Aftenposten asked him if he went too far by not recognizing Israel, he answered:

The op-ed is a judgement prophecy. Of course I don't mean that Israel has no right to defend herself. What I say is no different from what the world community has been saying through the UN resolutions. Again and again we see Israel overreacting, says Gaarder, and stresses that he is not against Israel as such, but that he distinguishes between the Israel of 1948 and the one of 1967.

== Reactions ==
Reactions to the article were mixed. Some in the Norwegian Jewish community, several Jewish organizations, and many Norwegian intellectuals criticized it as being too harsh or lopsided. Many saw it as having been written in a literary style inappropriate for a mass medium discussion of such a controversial topic. But many also expressed their support for his op-ed piece, or at least what they saw as the gist of it.

Some members of the Norwegian Jewish community as well as several historians in Jewish history, and other Norwegian pundits expressed deep concern and outrage over imagery and themes reminiscent of religious antisemitism, in which Christianity was promoted as the humanistic, peaceful successor to Judaism. The official position of the Church of Norway has long been to condemn the use of Christian themes to put Judaism in a bad light. Some spoke up against Gaarder for his views on Israel as well as the perceived antisemitic connotations of his article. Others expressed understanding of the sentiments behind the article, but felt the form and wording were open to different interpretations.

The day after Gaarder's op-ed Simon Samuels of the Simon Wiesenthal Center published a rebuttal, "Open Letter to the People of Norway", also published in Aftenposten, where he speculated that Gaarder must be suffering from mental illness:

Jostein Gaarder, the author of the literary chef d'oeuvre, "Sophie's World," has become seriously ill, either with malice or, perhaps, Alzheimer's, or both. Translated into 53 languages and with 26 million copies sold, so many of his readers will mourn Gaarder's current loss of vision, coherence and, above all, his recruitment to the forces of darkness. His 5 August article in your newspaper has exposed his shallow Biblical knowledge and the Judeophobic paranoia that haunts his nightmares. We call on the Norwegian people to decry his message. Obsessed with the Jews as "God's Chosen People," Gaarder regurgitates this concept's classic antisemitic definition as "arrogant and domineering."

Samuels finished his letter by emphasizing that Jewish sovereignty has returned and that Gaarder and those he seeks to appease will not be obliged:

Gaarder concludes: "Let not one Israeli child pay with his life," in the same column wherein he sets the scene for the extermination of all Israeli children. We will not oblige Gaarder and those he seeks to appease. Jewish sovereignty has returned to history. The wandering Jew is a figment of history, as Gaarder and his ilk are now history. We await the word of honest Norwegians who will vociferously condemn Gaarder because they realize that the fate of the Jews is an alarm bell for humanity.

In numerous interviews after the publication of the op-ed, Gaarder maintained that he is not an anti-Semite and that the piece was never intended as an attack on the Jewish people or on Judaism. Several members of the Norwegian Jewish community, however, said that regardless of Gaarder's intent, the article served to legitimize deep-rooted antisemitic attitudes by tying them in with a public opinion already hostile to Israel. Odd-Bjørn Fure, a well-known Norwegian historian and director of the Norwegian Center for Studies of Holocaust and Religious Minorities wrote: "[...] Gaarder uses a language which contributes to lowering barriers in the description of Israel and Jewish culture. [...] Gaarder has crossed a line, but I don't think he realizes it".

Three days after publishing the op-ed, Jostein Gaarder announced his intention to "withdraw from the debate." While admitting that the style of his op-ed was "challenging" and open to different interpretations, he felt little would be served by his continued contribution. He maintained that the original piece was motivated by "disgust for the war, and the wrongdoing of the Israeli army". Gaarder also said:

"We have a very good word in Norwegian for what Israel is doing in Lebanon: Hærverk [vandalism, or literally "the work of an army"]. And I also condemn the rockets of Hezbollah against Israel, just to make that clear. I have said it numerous times, and will repeat it: I'm a humanist, not an antisemite. Both the Jewish and Greek ideas are part of the foundation of what I believe in" .

Jostein Gaarder's Israeli publisher, Schocken Publishing House, announced 9 August 2006, that it would stop cooperating with Gaarder and no longer publish his books. In addition, Racheli Edelman, the owner-publisher of Schocken Publishing House, is looking into whether the op-ed could form the basis of a lawsuit against Gaarder. Schocken changed its decision after Gaarder's Norwegian publisher Aschehoug contacted Schocken and expressed the view that it would be "a scandal if a publisher dropped an author because of a debate". William Nygaard, director of Aschehoug, Gaarder's publisher in Norway, who himself was a victim of an assassination attempt presumed to be a result of the fatwa issued against Salman Rushdie for publishing The Satanic Verses, expressed support for Gaarder:

"I think it is very important that Jostein Gaarder, as an active person in the Norwegian public sphere and as an internationally renowned author, is willing, in the name of free speech, to take on the burden of critically commenting on a sensitive subject such as the conflict between Israel and Lebanon."

The strong attacks and accusations about antisemitism against Gaarder have prompted commentators to voice criticism against what they perceive as a misuse of the label "antisemite" against critics of Israel. Associate professor in Middle Eastern history Hilde Henriksen Waage at the University of Oslo commented that: "Any debate about the politics of the state of Israel drowns in accusations of antisemitism and racism" and intimated that Gaarder would not be safe in Norway after this op-ed. The former prime minister of Norway Kåre Willoch criticised the attacks on Gaarder, stating that "whenever Israel's politics are criticised, there are attempts to divert the attention from what this is really about."

== Second op-ed in 2006 and afterthought in 2011 ==
On 12 August 2006, Gaarder published a new op-ed piece in the Aftenposten. This had the title "Forsøk på klargjøring" ["An attempt to clarify"]. It has since been translated into English.

In 2011, he wrote a piece called "Afterthought" in Aftenposten where he regretted that he had used some thoughtless phrases that could be misinterpreted as anti-Judaistic.
