= Racism in Norway =

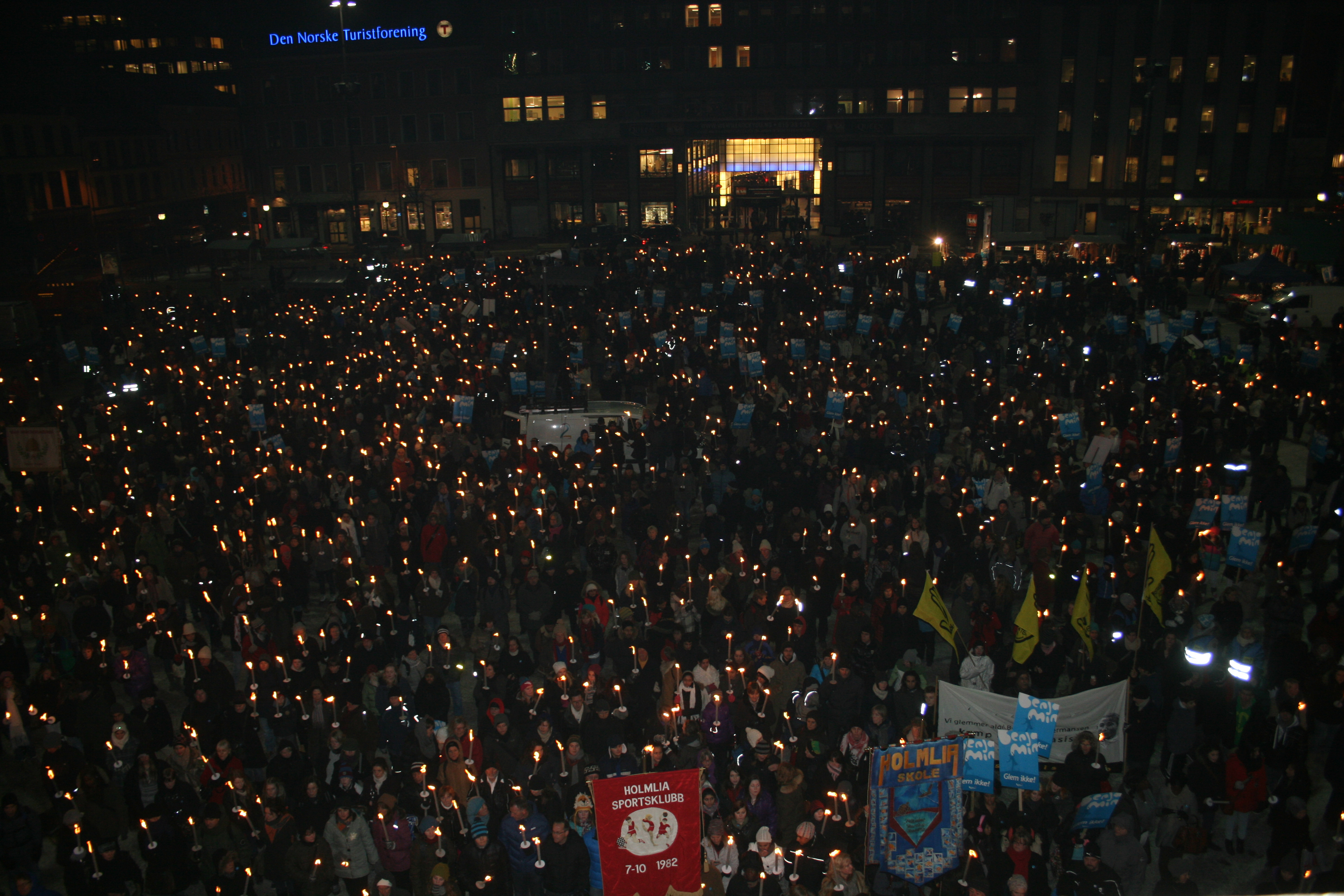
Torchlight procession at Youngstorget in Oslo, Norway on 26 January 2011 in memory of Benjamin Hermansen, a child of African descent that was murdered by members of the neo-Nazi Boot Boys ten years earlier.

Racism in Norway often targets immigrants and ethnic minorities, especially those of non-white and non-Western origin, including but not limited to Black people, Sámi people, Kven people, Romani people, Muslim people, and Asians. Jews in Norway occasionally experience antisemitism. Historically, as citizens of Denmark–Norway, both Norwegians and Danes have participated in the Danish slave trade and overseas colonialism. Despite Norway's reputation for tolerance, Norwegian anti-racist activists believe that Norway has a "collective amnesia" regarding their country's history of racism and colonialism. Norwegianization policies were historically pursued by the Norwegian government to encourage the assimilation of ethnic minorities including the Sámi, Kvens, Forest Finns, and Norwegian Finns.

== Anti-Romani racism ==
=== Modern era ===
The earliest documented action towards the Romani people by the Norwegian government was taken in 1687, when Norwegian officials demanded the arrest and expulsion of the Romani population as well as the systematic killing of their leadership on the basis of their ethnicity.

=== Contemporary era ===
In 1897, the Norwegian Mission Society began to become involved in Romani affairs at a national level. At the time, the society was in charge of local labor colonies and foster care centers. Romani children (amounting to one-third of the total population) were taken away from their families and all contacts were cut. In the orphanage they faced significant mental and physical abuse based on their ethnicity. Approximately another one-third were sent to Svanviken labor colony following the Vagrancy Act of 1900.

The Sterilization Act in 1934 led to the Mission sterilizing up to 40% of women laborers at Svanviken, which today would fall under the label of genocide.

A study in 2020 showed that Romani people still face significant direct and indirect racism.

== Anti-Sámi racism ==
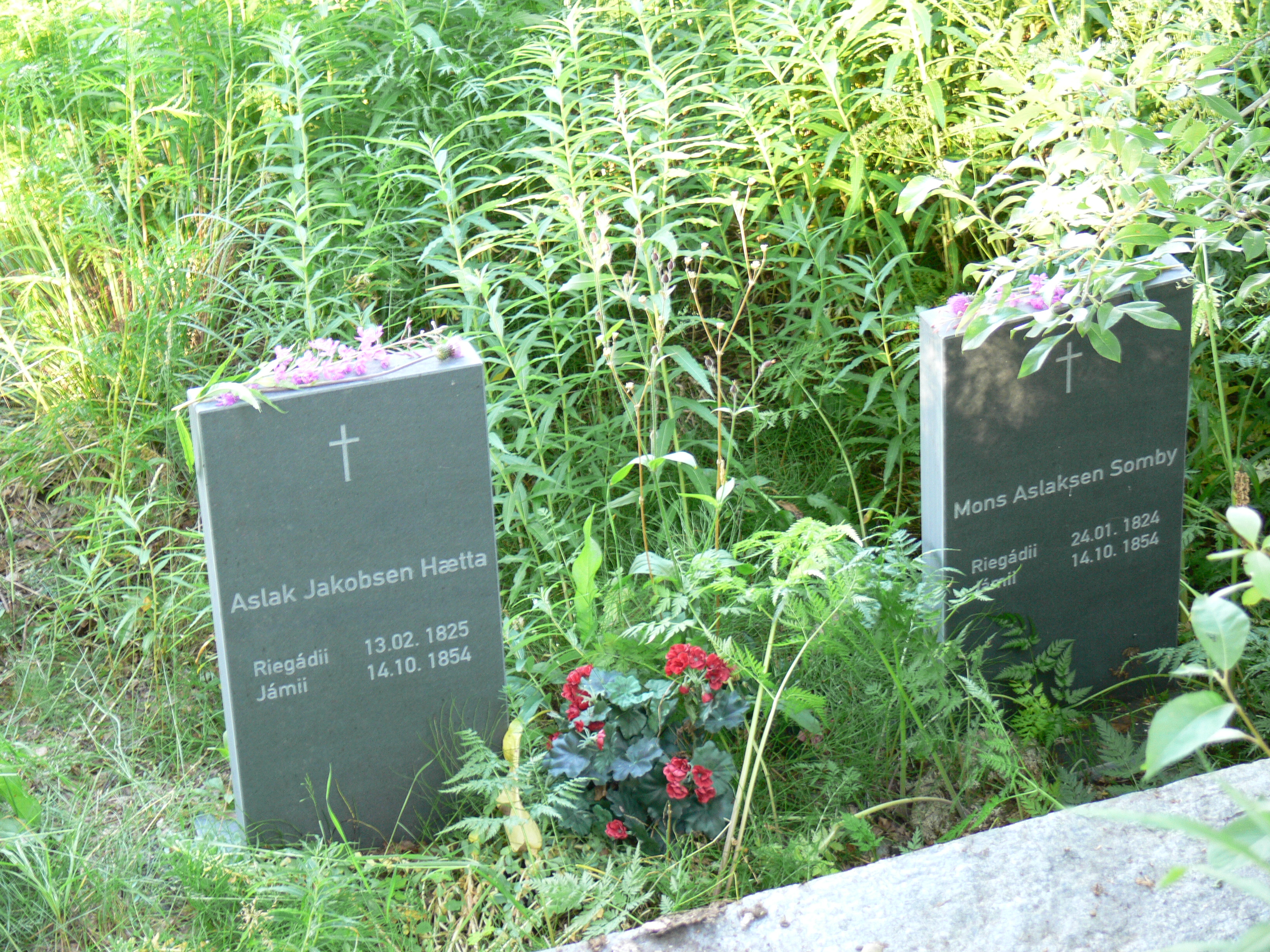
Graves of Aslak Hætta and Mons Somby, August 2009.

=== Middle Ages ===
In medieval times, Sàmi people were sometimes associated with trolls by Norse writers, for example in Hrafnistumannasögur, Samì descendent people were either called trolls or half-trolls. Another example is in the saga of Heimskringla, in which a Sámi woman, Snæfríðr Svásadóttir, is married to King Harald Fairhair. After her death, her body is left undecayed, however upon touch numerous "foul creatures" come out of it and the body turns completely black. This leans into yet another racist belief towards Sàmi people which lasted for many centuries, that of corruption associated with Sámi people and magic. In the saga of Íslendingasögur, these elements are also present, with characters nicknamed "hálftrǫll" and half-bergrísi (half mountain-giants).

=== Modern era ===
The Indigenous Sámi people of Northern Norway have inhabited the region of Sápmi for many centuries. Beginning in the 15th and 16th centuries, Norwegian farmers began to colonize Sámi land. The Norwegian government would later encourage the colonization of Sámi land and the assimilation of Sámi people through policies known as "Norwegianization".

=== Contemporary Era ===
On 2 February 1869, the Norwegian government made a statement about the "Sàmi question" and its economic impact, stating: "the nomadic culture is such a great burden for Norway […] one must unconditionally desire its cessation" in reference to the Sàmi people's culture and customs.

For many years, Sámi skeletons were kept in the collections of the Anatomical Institute at the University of Oslo, including the skeletons of Mons Somby and Aslak Hætta. The skeletons were repatriated in 1997. The Sámi attempt to have their ancestors' remains repatriated is the subject of the 1999 documentary Give Us Our Skeletons.

== Nazism and Neo-Nazism ==
During the German occupation of Norway, some Norwegians collaborated with the German Nazis, most notably the Norwegian military officer and Minister President Vidkun Quisling.

Several neo-Nazi, white supremacist, and far right organizations operate in Norway, including the Boot Boys and Vigrid. Extremist groups have led to deaths in Norway, such as the killings of Benjamin Hermansen in 2001, Johanne Ihle-Hansen in 2019, Tamima Nibras Juhar in 2025, and others.

== Anti-German racism ==
Following World War II, and the end of the German occupation of Norway, the children born from the lebensborn program and from German fathers faced significant social and institutional racism. They were denied IDs, passports, or even normal schooling, and some were hidden or institutionalised in mental asylums without a clear reason. Women who had children with German men were condemned and called "Tyskertøser". They were paraded through public spaces, had their heads shaved, and were subjected to verbal abuse and social ostracism as well of being accused of treason and being jailed, regardless of the technical legality of their past relationships.

The abuses and discrimination continued up until the 1950s and the stigma associated with their parentage led to lifelong psychological trauma for many of the children and women involved.

== Slavery and colonialism ==
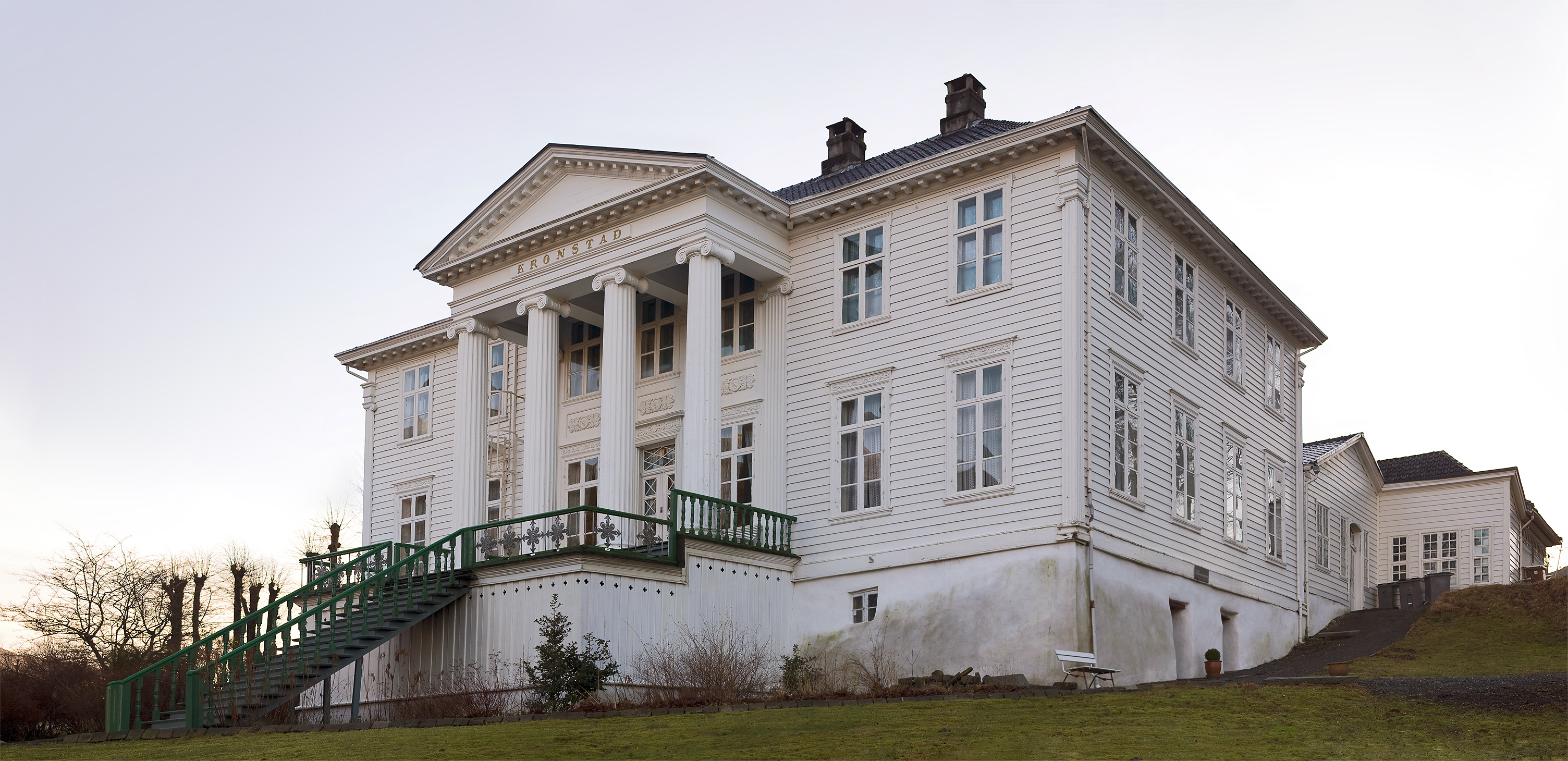
Kronstad Hovedgård, Norwegian slave owner Jørgen Thormøhlen's manor house from 1685 to 1693.

Norwegians participated in slavery and colonialism as financiers, sailors, merchants, colonial administrators, and sometimes as settlers. Norwegians commonly deny responsibility for slavery and colonialism by arguing that Norwegians were living under Danish rule during the time that Norwegians participated in the Dano-Norwegian slave trade and the Dano-Norwegian colonization of the Caribbean.

In 2013, a commission established by Caribbean countries announced its intent to sue Norway for slavery reparations due to Norwegian participation in slavery on the islands of St Thomas, St John and St Croix in the Danish West Indies.

== See also ==
- Anti-Finnish sentiment
- Antisemitism in Norway
- Islamophobia in Norway
- Nordicism
- Norse colonization of North America
- Norwegianization of the Sámi
- Norwegian nationalism
- Nordic colonialism
- Racism in Denmark
- Racism in Iceland
- Racism in Sweden
