= Oslo Jewish Museum =

Museum covering Jewish history in Norway

Coordinates: 59°54′59″N 10°45′19″E

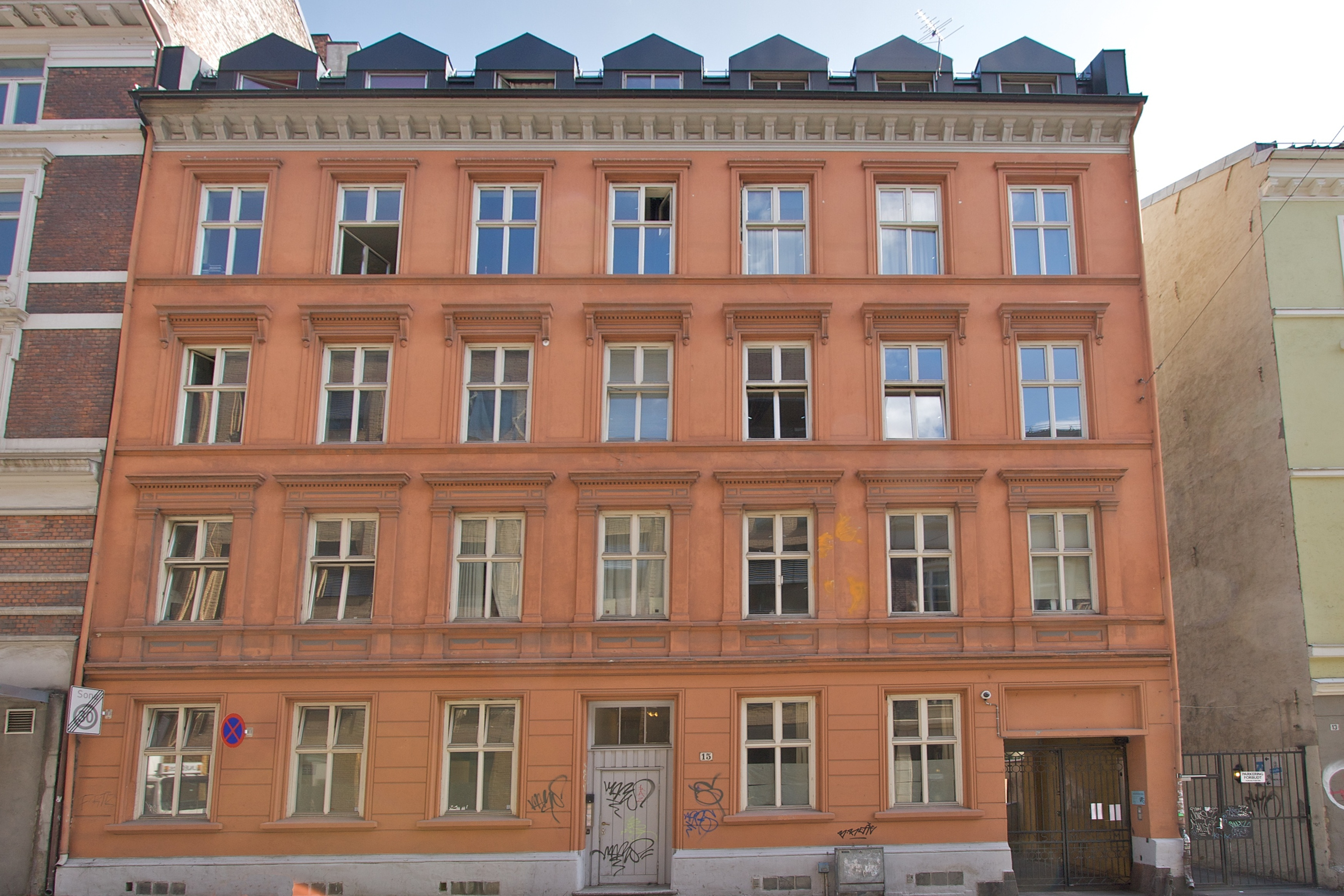
Oslo Jewish Museum is located in Calmeyers gate 15

The Oslo Jewish Museum (Norwegian: Jødisk Museum i Oslo) aims to inform about Jews in Norway. It was established as a foundation in 2003, supported by Det Mosaiske Trossamfund and Oslo City Museum.

The purpose of the museum is to collect, preserve, research, and communicate reliable knowledge about and increase understanding of the history of Jews in Norway, knowledge about Jewish culture, daily life, religious practices, and integration into Norwegian society. It also aims to serve as an inspiration for cultural activity, knowledge dissemination, and debate. The museum seeks to be a bridge-builder between Jewish communities and the wider society. The Jewish Museum in Oslo hosts lectures, concerts, temporary exhibitions, and other outward-facing cultural activities. The themes the museum address include Jewish culture, tradition, and history, as well as Judaism in general.

The museum was officially opened by Haakon, Crown Prince of Norway on September 8, 2008. The location was selected as one where there had been a substantial Jewish population. A synagogue stood on the same street from 1921 to 1942, and many of the Jews immigrating to Norway from the Baltics lived in the vicinity.

In 2014 the museum was nominated for Museumforbundet's Museum of the Year Award—alongside KODE and Telemark Museum.

== See also ==
- Trondheim Synagogue
- Oslo Synagogue
- History of the Jews in Norway
- The Holocaust in Norway
