= Det Mosaiske Trossamfund =

- Headquarters: Oslo
- Region served: Norway
- Website: www.dmt.oslo.no/en/about-us/

The Det Mosaiske Trossamfund (DMT), as known as the Jewish Community of Oslo, is an umbrella organization representing Norwegian Jews. The organization is Orthodox, but welcomes non-Orthodox and secular Jews.

== About ==
All Norwegian Jews who are Jewish according to Orthodox halakha are eligible for membership in the community, meaning Jews who are born to a Jewish mother or who undergo an Orthodox conversion to Judaism. The community operates the Oslo Synagogue, a Jewish kindergarten, and Kosher Mat, the only kosher market in Oslo. Kosher Mat is located in the basement of the Jewish community center in Oslo, which is adjacent to the Oslo Synagogue. The community also supports the Jewish Museum in Oslo.

== History ==
The community was established in Oslo in June, 1892. Originally named Det Jødiske Samfund i Christiania (The Jewish Community in Christiania), the name was changed to Det Mosaiske Trossamfund (The Mosaic Community) a year later.

In 2015, following the antisemitic 2015 Copenhagen shootings, a group of young Muslim activists organized a human chain around the Oslo Synagogue to demonstrate solidarity with the Jewish community. Ervin Kohn, the head of Det Mosaiske Trossamfund, endorsed the effort as an "extremely positive" moment in inter-minority relations in Norway.

== See also ==
- History of the Jews in Norway
