= Guri Hjeltnes =

Norwegian journalist and historian (born 1953)

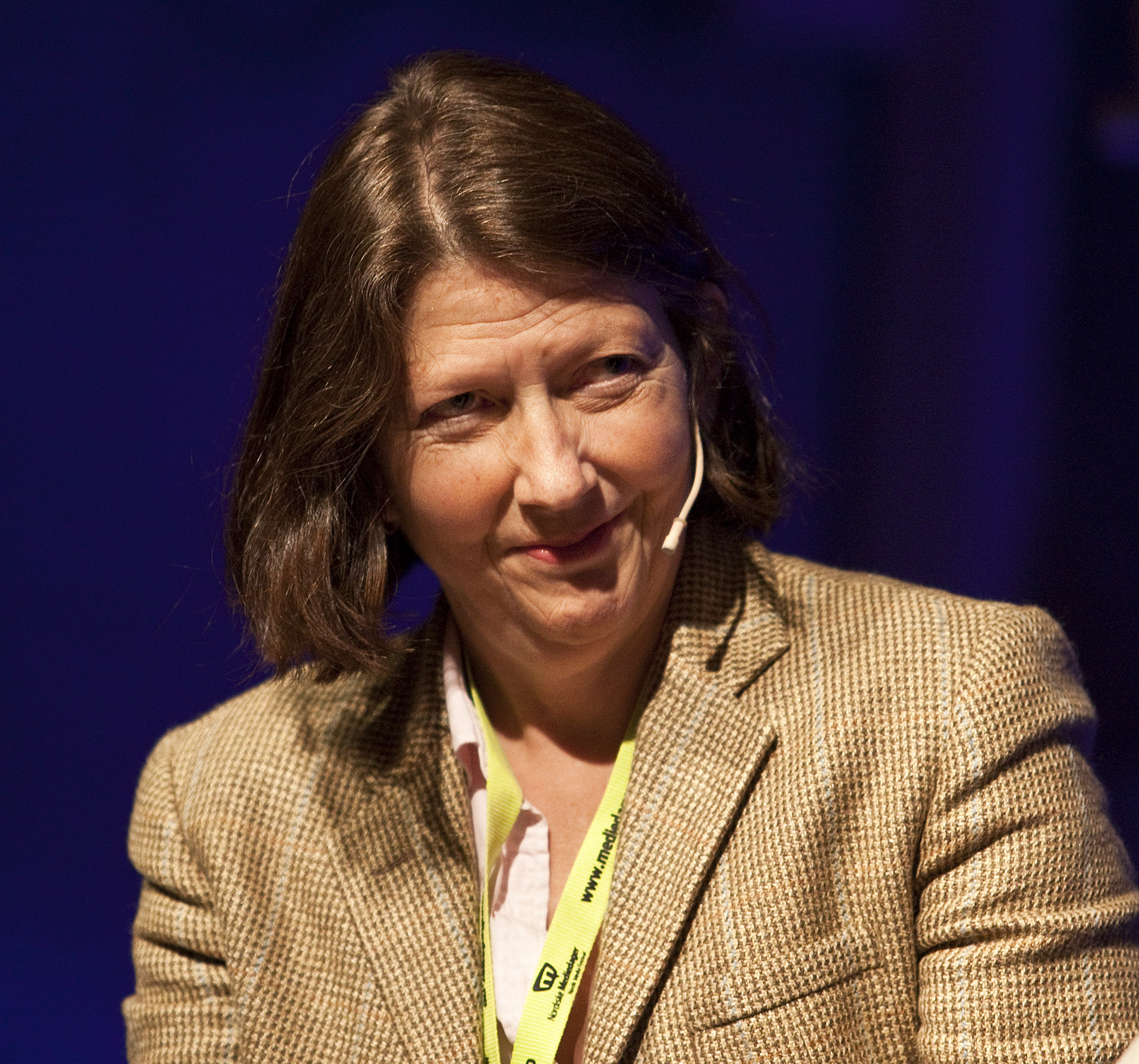
- Born: 23 October 1953 (age 71); Stavanger, Norway
- Citizenship: Norwegian
- Spouse: Bernt Hagtvet
- Scientific career
- Fields: WWII history media studies
- Institutions: BI Norwegian Business School

Guri Hjeltnes (born 23 October 1953) is a Norwegian journalist and historian. Having mainly researched Norwegian World War II history during her career, she is a professor of journalism at the BI Norwegian Business School since 2004. She has also spent considerable time as a journalist and commentator, currently in Verdens Gang. She became director of the Center for Studies of the Holocaust and Religious Minorities in 2012.

== Career ==
Guri Hjeltnes was born in Stavanger. She worked as a journalist in Arbeiderbladet from 1979 to 1985, and has also worked for other newspapers on a freelance basis. From the mid-1980s she concentrated mainly on research, although she worked part-time for Verdens Gang from 1991 as a book reviewer. She was a research fellow at the Norwegian Institute for Defence Studies from 1999 to 2004, including a stint as visiting scholar at Yale University from 2000 to 2002. In 2002 she also took the dr.philos. degree.

In 2004 she was hired in Verdens Gang on a full-time basis, but after a few months she left to become a professor of journalism at the BI Norwegian Business School. She is also vice rector there, and still works as a commentator in Verdens Gang.

The bulk of her authorship pertains to Norwegian World War II history. Her first major work was Den norske nasjonalsosialismen, published in 1982 together with Hans Fredrik Dahl and Bernt Hagtvet. In 1984 she published Hver fredag foran porten together with Wanda Heger. For this they were awarded the Gyldendal Documentary Prize. Hjeltnes then published Hverdagsliv, volume five of Norge i krig (1986) and then Avisoppgjøret etter 1945 (1990), examining the role of Norwegian newspapers during and after the German occupation of Norway. Her next major work were volume three and four of Handelsflåten i krig 1939–45: Sjømann — lang vakt (1995) and Krigsseiler — Krig, hjemkomst og opprør (1997). In 2000 Hjeltnes and Berit Nøkleby wrote Barn under krigen. Hjeltnes also contributed to the Norsk krigsleksikon 1940–45, an encyclopedia published in 1995. In 2003 she was among the writers of 3 uker i desember: en kritisk gjennomgang av medienes rolle i den såkalte Tønne-saken, a critical overview on the role of the media in connection to the death of politician Tore Tønne. After her appointment at the BI Norwegian Business School, she has taken more interest in media studies, including topics such as media convergence.

Hjeltnes is a member of the board of the Fritt Ord Foundation, and has chaired the SKUP Foundation.

== Personal life ==
Hjeltnes is married to Bernt Hagtvet, a political scientist.
