= Bernt Hagtvet =

Norwegian political scientist

- Born: 5 March 1946 (age 79); Oslo, Norway
- Occupation: Political scientist
- Employer: University of Oslo
- Spouse: Guri Hjeltnes

Bernt Hagtvet (born 5 March 1946) is a Norwegian political scientist. He is a professor emeritus of political science at the University of Oslo. Among his areas of interest are European politics, extremist movements and human rights. He was born in Oslo and is married to historian Guri Hjeltnes. He is a member of the Norwegian Academy of Science and Letters. He was among the founders and stayed on as a board member at Human Rights House Foundation. He is now (2017?) the interim chair of the board.
