= Mikal Sylten =

Norwegian journalist

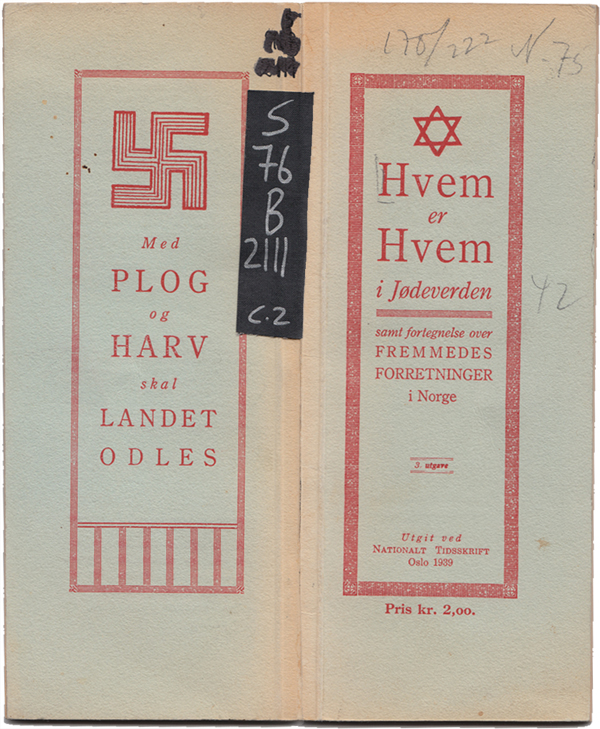
Who's Who in the Jewish World

Mikal Peder Olaus Sylten (27 July 1873 – 27 November 1964) was a Norwegian writer.

Originally a typographer, from 1916 he published a periodical, Nationalt Tidsskrift. It was staunchly antisemitic and anti-Zionist, and Sylten took up the swastika as a symbol in 1917, three years before Adolf Hitler chose to do so. He also published a pamphlet called Hvem er hvem i jødeverdenen, "Who's Who in the Jewish World", in 1925. In it, Sylten catalogued Jews or presumed Jews in Norway. New editions followed in 1932, 1938 and 1941.

Because of his interest in Jewish affairs, Sylten was used as a consultant for the National Socialist authorities during the German occupation of Norway. He also enrolled in Nasjonal Samling, at that time the only legal party, on 1 March 1942. However, he was described as an "outsider" and was never directly active in the party. He had some contact with other antisemitic publishers, such as Alf Amble who ran the periodical Vår kamp.

As part of the legal purge in Norway after World War II, Sylten was sentenced to fifteen months of forced labour. In addition, his periodical was stopped. He emigrated to Malmö, Sweden, in 1964, and died the same year.
