= Bente Kahan =

Norwegian musician (born 1958)

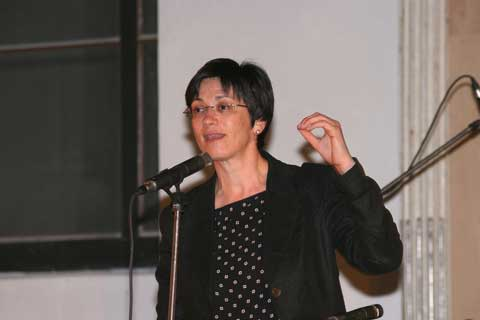
- Born: Bente Kahan; 23 September 1958 (age 67); Oslo, Norway
- Occupations: Singer, actress, director
- Years active: 1980s–present
- Spouse: Aleksander Gleichgewicht
- Children: Daniel Kahan Gleichgewicht Voja Kahan Gleichgewicht
- Parents: Herman Kahan (father); Ester Rachel Kahan (mother)
- Musical career
- Genres: Klezmer; Sung poetry
- Instruments: Vocals, guitar
- Labels: Tylko Muzyka; Jazz Sound
- Website: www.bentekahan.eu
- Website: bentekahan.eu

Bente Kahan (born 23 September 1958) is a Norwegian solo vocalist, actress, musician, director and playwright. She is best known for her renditions and productions of Yiddish folk music and plays. Since 2002, she has lived and worked in Poland.

== Biography ==
Kahan was born in Oslo. Her parents are Holocaust survivors: her mother escaped to Sweden during World War II, with most of her family taken to Auschwitz and murdered there in 1942; her father, Herman Kahan (born as Chaim Hersh Kahan), a member of the Satmar hasidic sect, was born in Romania, and he was saved by an American soldier who saw his arm moving under a pile of dead bodies.

Kahan is a graduate in performing arts at Tel Aviv University, and also at the American Musical and Dramatic Academy, in New York City.

== Career ==
Kahan sings mainly in Yiddish, but has also recorded and performed in Ladino, Hebrew and a mix of Yiddish with Polish, Russian, Norwegian, Hungarian, German and English.

Kahan started her career acting in 1981 at the Habima theatre in Tel Aviv and at the Nationaltheatret in Norway, performing for the first time as a singer in Oslo, for a play in Yiddish, the cabaret show Over Byen, in 1983. Together with Ellen Foyn Bruun she has written three plays: Bessie (about blues singer Bessie Smith) in 1986; Letter Without a Stamp in 1988; and Stemmer fra Theresienstadt in 1995—translated into German the same year and into English in 1997.

In 1990, after serving in several Norwegian theatrical companies, she founded her own, Teater Dybbuk in Oslo. In 2001, she moved with her husband and two children to Wrocław. She is the current director of the Wrocław Centre for Jewish Culture and Education.

== Bente Kahan Foundation ==
Kahan came up with the Bente Kahan Foundation in 2006, aiming to furthering mutual respect and human rights through the perspective of the Holocaust. Their first activity was the restoration of the White Stork Synagogue in Wrocław, the only synagogue in that city to have survived the Holocaust, as part of their efforts to preserve the 800 year-old-history of the Jews in Lower Silesia. This was completed in 2010.

Kahan was honored in 2013 with the Knight's Cross of the Order of Polonia Restituta, for her efforts on behalf of intercultural dialogue and for the rescue of the Jewish heritage of Lower Silesia.

== Discography ==
- 1991: Yiddishkayt
- 1992: Farewell Cracow
- 1996: Stemmer fra Theresienstadt (Norwegian)
- 1996: Stimmen aus Theresienstadt (German)
- 1997: Voices from Theresienstadt (English)
- 1998: Di Gojim (klezmer music)
- 2000: Home (Yiddish, Ladino, and Hebrew)
- 2005: Sing with us in Yiddish
- 2016: Only A Human Being Bente Kahan Sings The Poetry Of Tadeusz Różewicz
