= Imre Hercz =

Norwegian physician

Imre Hercz (10 March 1929 – 24 July 2011) was a Jewish Hungarian-Norwegian physician and public debater.

Hercz was born in Transylvania and had his childhood years in Nagyvárad, in the Hungarian part of Romania. At the age of 15, he was deported to Auschwitz concentration camp in May 1944, later to Vernichtungslager Kaufbeuren (also known as Riederloh II) and then to Dachau concentration camp, but survived. After being hospitalized in Amberg for five and a half years, he recovered and emigrated to Norway in 1952 as one of several Jewish Holocaust-survivors of lesser health accepted to Norway with substantial grants from Joint to the Norwegian government. He finished secondary education in 1955 and graduated from the University of Oslo with a cand.med. degree in 1961. He worked in Tønsberg, Vinstra, and Brumunddal from 1962 to 1970, before opening a medical clinic in Høvik in 1971. He resided in Nesbru, and later moved to Høvik.

Hercz represented the Liberal Party as a deputy member of the municipal council for Ringsaker Municipality from 1968 to 1970, and chaired the local party branch. He was a board member of the Mosaic Religious Community (Jewish Community in Oslo) from 1972 to 1991, member of the Norwegian Refugee Council from 1972 to 1991, national board member of the Norwegian Medical Association from 1981 to 1993 and national council member of Allmennpraktiserende Legers Forening (General Practicians Association) from 1984 to 1991.

Hercz is well known from the public debate on health policy, but even more so in the debate on defamation and anti-Semitism. He has held several public speeches, among others for school students. In February 2009 he won a ruling from Pressens Faglige Utvalg, where a comedian aired on national TV 2 was admonished for defamation and breach of the Ethical Code of Practice for the Norwegian Press. In June 2011 he was awarded the King's Medal of Merit. He received patients in his office at Høvik Legesenter even up to his death, making him, at 82 years of age, one of the oldest practicing doctors in Norway.

Hercz was married and had four children. He died in July 2011.
