= Oskar Mendelsohn =

- Born: 29 March 1912; Trondheim, Norway
- Died: 1 August 1993 (aged 81)
- Occupations: Educator, non-fiction writer, historian
- Awards: Order of St. Olav (1969)

Oskar Mendelsohn (29 March 1912 – 1 August 1993) was a Norwegian educator, non-fiction writer and historian.

== Biography ==
Mendelsohn was born in Trondheim on 29 March 1912. He was a son of wholesaler Aron Mendelsohn and Thora Paltiel. In 1938 he married Sussi Melamed (1910–95).

Among his books is a two-volume work on the history of Jews in Norway, published in 1969 and 1986. In 1990 he published a book on the persecution of Jews in Norway during World War II (English edition in 1991). He was decorated Knight, First Class of the Order of St. Olav in 1989.

== Bibliography ==
- Jødenes historie i Norge gjennom 300 år (Volume 1 in 1969, Volume 2 in 1986)
