= Trondheim Synagogue =

Orthodox synagogue in Trondheim, Norway

- Norwegian: Synagogen i Trondheim
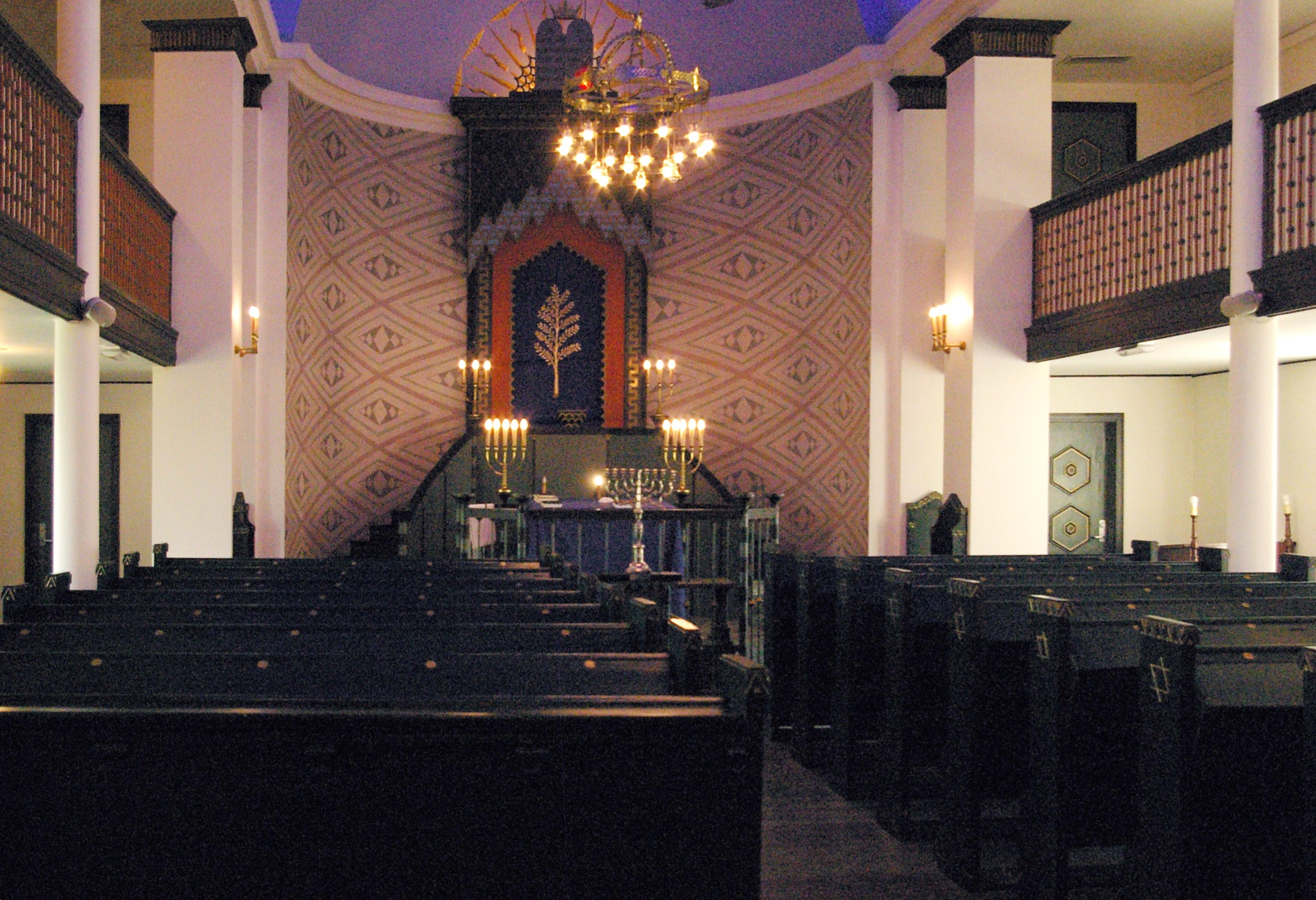
- The synagogue interior in 2007

- Location of the synagogue in Norway

Religion
- Affiliation: Orthodox Judaism
- Rite: Nusach Ashkenaz
- Ecclesiastical or organizational status: Synagogue (1925–1941; and since 1947); Profane use (1941–1947); Jewish museum (since 1997)
- Ownership: Det Jødiske Samfunn i Trondheim
- Status: Active

Location
- Location: Arkitekt Christies gate 1B, Trondheim
- Country: Norway
- Interactive map of Trondheim Synagogue
- Coordinates: 63°25′35″N 10°23′34″E

Architecture
- Architects: Georg Andrea Bull (1864); Jakob Parelius Holmgren (1925)
- Type: Railway station (1864); Synagogue architecture (1925)
- Style: Romanesque Revival
- Established: 1892 (as a congregation)
- Completed: 1864 (as a railway station); 1925 (as a synagogue)
- Materials: Brick

Website
- djst.no

The Trondheim Synagogue (Norwegian: Synagogen i Trondheim) is a Jewish congregation and synagogue, located at Arkitekt Christies gate 1B, in Trondheim, Norway. Established as a congregation in June 1892, the present synagogue has served the Jewish community since its inauguration on October 13, 1925. It was built to replace the first synagogue in Trondheim, the St Jørgensveita Synagogue, which was opened in 1899.

Since 1997, the building has also served as a Jewish museum.

== History ==
The synagogue is Orthodox. The synagogue has a gallery where the women can seat separately. Used for profane purposes by Nazis during World War II, the synagogue was reconsecrated in 1947 and continued to serve as a synagogue.

It is the second-northernmost synagogue in the world (after the synagogue in Fairbanks, Alaska).

== See also ==
- History of the Jews in Norway
