= Oslo Synagogue =

Orthodox synagogue in Oslo, Norway

- Norwegian: Synagogen i Oslo
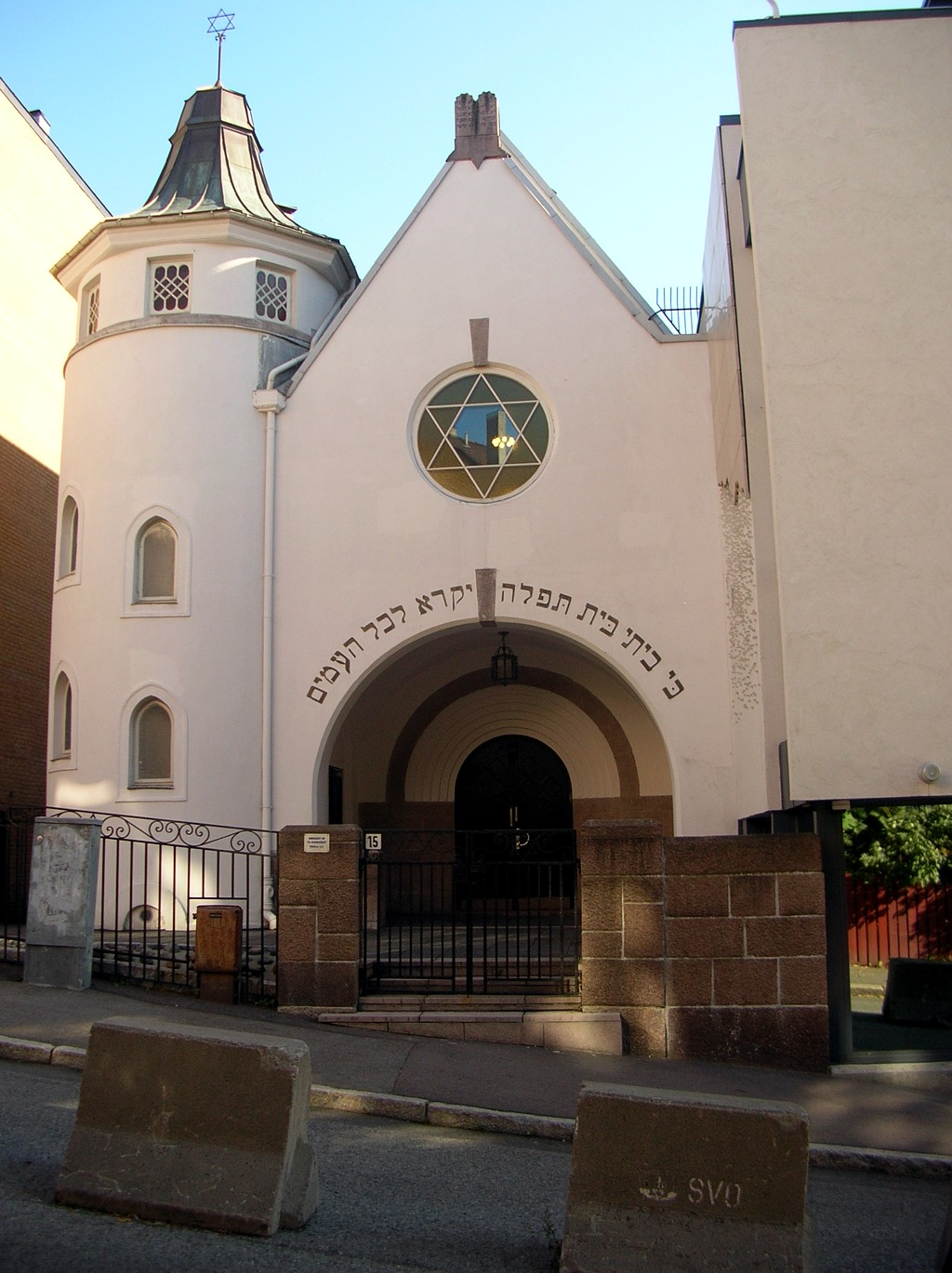
- The synagogue exterior in 2007, note concrete barriers

- Location of the synagogue in Oslo

Religion
- Affiliation: Orthodox Judaism
- Rite: Nusach Ashkenaz
- Ecclesiastical or organisational status: Synagogue
- Ownership: Det Mosaiske Trossamfund
- Status: Active

Location
- Location: Bergstien 13, 0172 Oslo, St. Hanshaugen
- Country: Norway
- Coordinates: 59°55′33″N 10°44′34″E

Architecture
- Type: Synagogue architecture
- Style: National Romanticism
- Established: 1892 (as a congregation)
- Completed: 1920
- Materials: Brick

Website
- dmt.oslo.no

The Oslo Synagogue (Norwegian: Synagogen i Oslo) is an Orthodox Jewish congregation and synagogue, located in Oslo, in the St. Hanshaugen region of Norway. The Det Mosaiske Trossamfund congregation was established in 1892, but the present building was erected in 1920.

Architectural historian Carol Herselle Krinsky describes the two-story tall, stuccoed building with a round tower topped with a spire supporting a Star of David as resembling "a simple and charming country chapel.'

King Harald V and Crown Prince Haakon visited the synagogue in June 2009.

== History ==
=== 2006 shooting attack ===
The synagogue was the site of a 2006 shooting attack, suspected by police to have been perpetrated by four men in a car. No one was injured. The four allegedly were the 29-year-old criminal-turned-Islamist Arfan Bhatti of Pakistani origin, a 28-year-old Norwegian-Pakistani, a 28-year-old Norwegian of foreign origin, and a 26-year-old Norwegian. Bhatti was acquitted for terror charges and convicted for co-conspiracy to the shooting (along with several other unrelated charges) which was instead judged as "coarse vandalism". The three other men were acquitted of all charges.

=== Interfaith peace ring ===
On 21 February 2015, around 1,000 people formed a human "ring of peace" outside the synagogue on Shabbat, to show that they deplore antisemitic violence. The event, which was initiated by a group of young Norwegian Muslims, occurred shortly after a string of terrorist attacks across Europe, including in the Île-de-France attacks in Paris and the Copenhagen shootings. According to organizer Hajrah Arshad, the intent of the ring was to show "that Islam is about love and unity." Zeeshan Abdullah, a co-organizer, stated that "We want to demonstrate that Jews and Muslims do not hate each other...We do not want individuals to define what Islam is for the rest of us...There are many more peace-mongers than warmongers." The crowd of Muslims, Jews, and others held hands in unity as Norway's Chief Rabbi Michael Melchior sang "Eliyahu Hanavi", the traditional song after Havdalah. The demonstration received international media attention. Some media reports stated that possibly only a minority of those present were Muslims. Ervin Kohn, the president of the Norwegian Jewish community, told enquiring reporters that the exact number of Muslims among those present at the demonstration was impossible to quantify.

== See also ==
- History of the Jews in Norway
