= Nationalt Tidsskrift =

Norwegian political magazine (1916–1945)

- Editor: Mikal Sylten
- Categories: Political magazine
- Founder: Mikal Sylten
- Founded: 1916
- Final issue: 1945
- Country: Norway
- Language: Norwegian

Nationalt Tidsskrift (English: National Journal) was a political magazine which was published in the period 1916–1945. The magazine was an antisemitic publication and had a radical right-wing political stance.

== History and profile ==
Nationalt Tidsskrift was started in 1916 by typographer Mikal Sylten, whose ultimate goal was to combat Zionism. The emblem of the magazine was a swastika. Although the circulation of the magazine was not high, it caused tensions due to its consistent and radical antisemitic propaganda which was based on the content taken from the German publications, including Theodor Fritsch’s Der Hammer. Sylten edited the magazine until 1945 when it ceased publication.
