= Center for Studies of the Holocaust and Religious Minorities =

Norwegian research institution in Oslo, Norway

Coordinates: 59°53′56″N 10°40′42″E

- Senter for studier av Holocaust og livssynsminoriteter
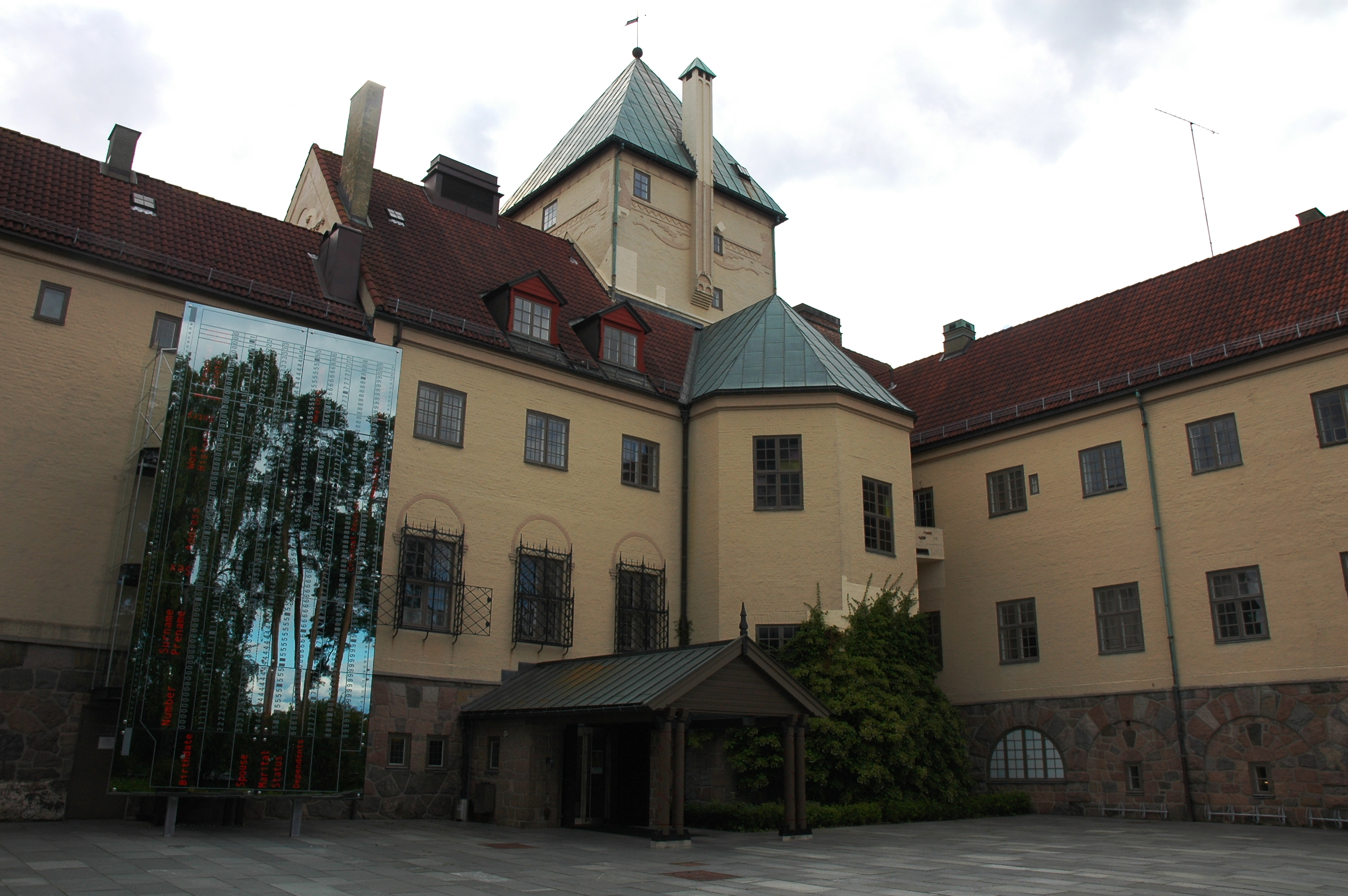
- Villa Grande
- Abbreviation: HL-senteret
- Formation: 2001
- Type: Foundation
- Location: Oslo
- Fields: Holocaust studies
- Director: Guri Hjeltnes
- Affiliations: University of Oslo (affiliated institute)
- Website: www.hlsenteret.no

The Center for Studies of the Holocaust and Religious Minorities (Norwegian: Senter for studier av Holocaust og livssynsminoriteter, or HL-senteret) is a Norwegian research institution. It is organised as an independent foundation and is an affiliated institute of the University of Oslo.

== History ==
The center was established in 2001. In 2006 it moved from the University of Oslo campus to Villa Grande, the former residence of Vidkun Quisling.

The center's endowment was donated by the Norwegian government at the behest of the Jewish community of Norway as part of the restitution made to Norwegian Jews for the confiscation of their property while Norway was occupied during World War II.

The center was established under the auspices of the University of Oslo and has a twofold mission:

1. Educating the public on the Holocaust, especially as related to the Norwegian experience, i.e., disenfranchisement, persecution, arrests, confinement, confiscation, and deportation to death camps outside of Norway, especially Auschwitz. This extends to studies of antisemitism in and outside of Norway, in the past, present, and future.
2. Studying ethnic and religious minorities, especially in Norway.

To this end, the center offers educational materials, programs, exhibitions, a museum, and library collections. Though it is an independent entity, it has established formal relationships with the University of Oslo, Yad Vashem, and the Jewish Museum in Trondheim.

On January 23, 2008, the center announced that an object of some importance had been stolen from the center's museum on or before November 23, 2007. The museum was temporarily closed after this to improve the security system.

== Directors ==
- Odd-Bjørn Fure 2002–2011
- Jakob Lothe 2011–2012
- Guri Hjeltnes 2012–

== Other notable employees ==
- Terje Emberland (A historian; called in to testify at the Trial of Anders Behring Breivik—to give his professional opinions)

== Photos of items on display ==
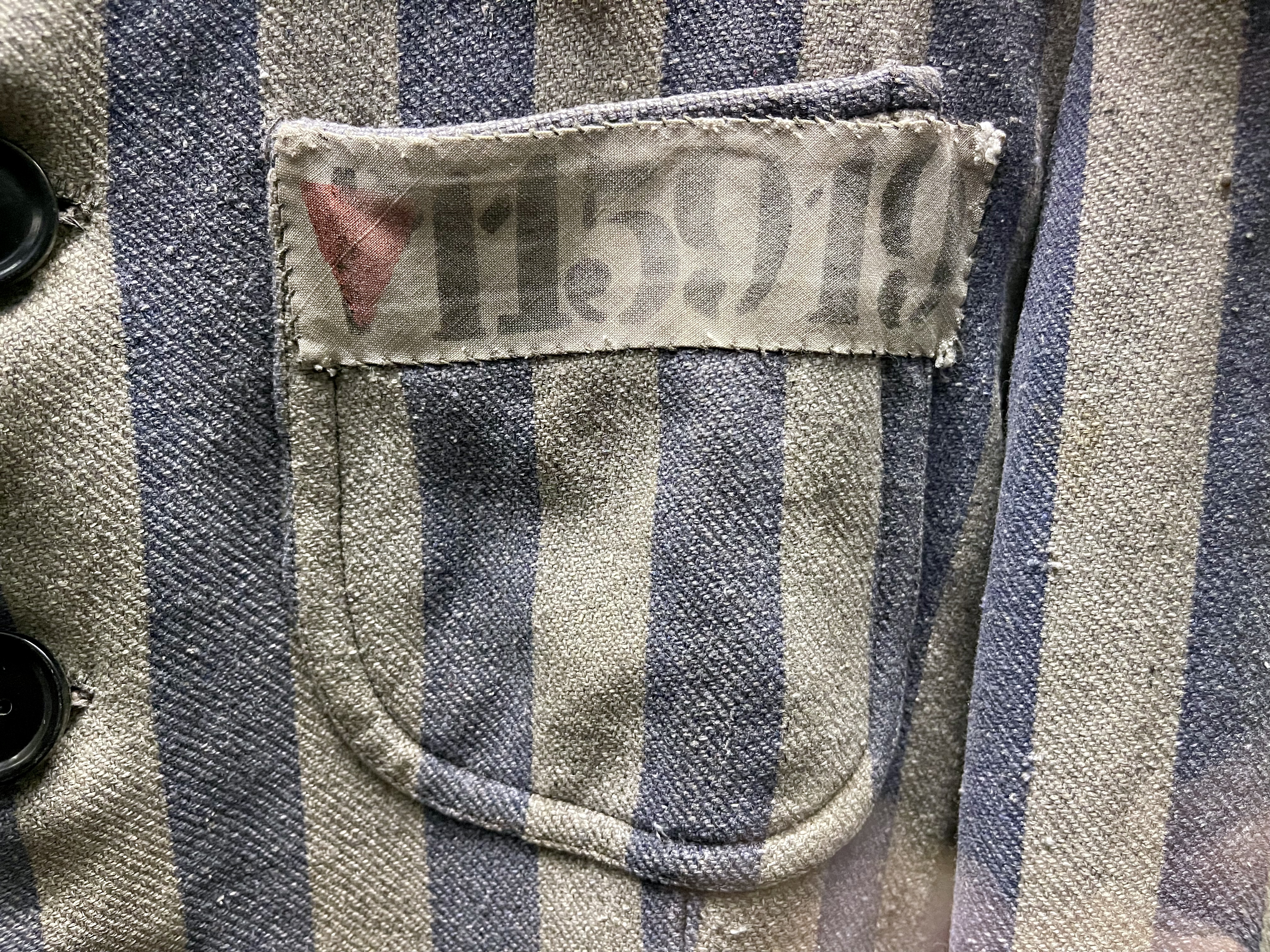
Pink or red triangle on a concentration camp uniform.

== See also ==
- Brown triangle – Military museum in Brussels, Belgium
- Purple triangle – Badge used in Nazi concentration camps to identify Jehovah's Witnesses
- Romani Holocaust – Genocide of the Romani in Europe during World War II
- Victims of Nazi Germany
