= 1909 World Allround Speed Skating Championships =

International speed skating competition

World Allround Speed Skating Championships
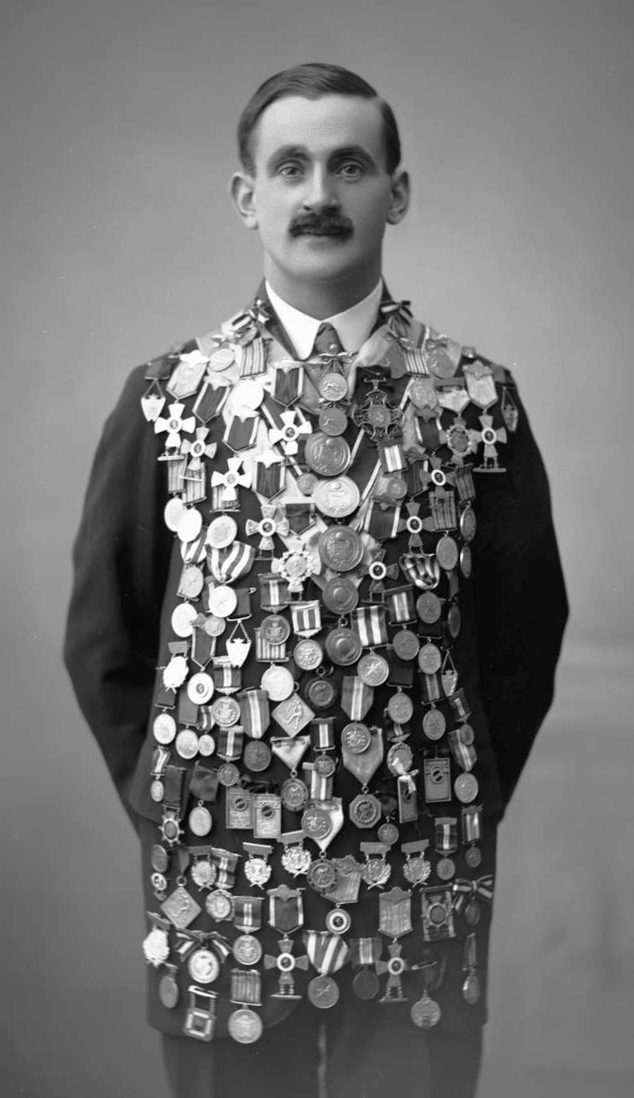
- Oscar Mathisen World champion 1909
- Venue: Gamle Frogner, Kristiania, Norway
- Dates: 27–28 February
- Competitors: 14 from 4 nations

Medalist men
1st place, gold medalist(s)		Oscar Mathisen	NOR
2nd place, silver medalist(s)		Oluf Steen	NOR
3rd place, bronze medalist(s)		Otto Andersson	SWE

The 1909 World Allround Speed Skating Championships took place at 27 and 28 February 1909 at the ice rink Gamle Frogner in Kristiania, Norway.

Oscar Mathisen was defending champion and succeeded in prolonging his title. He had the lowest number of points awarded, and no one won three distances. This was the first time that a World champion was declared without winning at least three distances.

== Allround results ==
Place	Athlete	Country	Points	500m	5000m	1500m	10000m
1st place, gold medalist(s)	Oscar Mathisen	Norway	11	45.6 (1)	8:53.8 (3)	2:27.4 (1)	18:52.0 (6)
2nd place, silver medalist(s)	Oluf Steen	Norway	14	46.0 (2)	8:58.8 (4)	2:30.6 (3)	18:50.8 (5)
3rd place, bronze medalist(s)	Otto Andersson	Sweden	18	49.0 (8)	8:53.4 (2)	2:34.2 (6)	18:31.8 (2)
4	Yevgeni Burnov	Russia	20	50.8 (12)	8:45.0 (1)	2:34.4 (7)	18:17.4 (1)
5	Martin Sæterhaug	Norway	20	46.2 (3)	9:07.0 (5)	2:29.8 (2)	18:58.4 (10)
6	Magnus Johansen	Norway	20,5	48.2 (6)	9:07.4 (6)	2:31.6 (4)	18:48.2 (4)
7	Sigurd Mathisen	Norway	29	47.0 (4)	9:10.4 (9)	2:32.8 (5)	19:16.4 (11)
8	Väinö Wickström	Finland	32,5	47.8 (5)	9:18.8 (11)	2:34.6 (8)	18:56.0 (8)
9	Trygve Lundgreen	Norway	32,5	48.2 (6)	9:17.6 (10)	2:35.6 (9)	18:53.0 (7)
10	Gotthard Thourén	Sweden	34	53.2 (13)	9:09.8 (7)	2:39.8 (12)	18:37.6 (3)
11	Olaf Hansen	Norway	37	49.8 (9)	9:10.0 (8)	2:37.6 (11)	18:56.0 (8)
12	Konrad Andresen	Norway	43,5	49.8 (9)	9:22.0 (12)	2:37.2 (10)	19:32.4 (12)
NC	Gustav Pedersen	Norway	–	NS	9:43.8 (14)	2:45.0 (14)	NS
NC	Thorleif Torgersen	Norway	–	50.0 (11)	9:39.2 (13)	2:44.0 (13)	NS

* = Fell
NC = Not classified
NF = Not finished
NS = Not started
DQ = Disqualified

Source: SpeedSkatingStats.com

== Rules ==
Four distances have to be skated:

- 500m
- 1500m
- 5000m
- 10000m

The ranking was made by award ranking points. The points were awarded to the skaters who had skated all the distances. The final ranking was then decided by ordering the skaters by lowest point totals.

- 1 point for 1st place
- 2 point for 2nd place
- 3 point for 3rd place
- and so on

One could win the World Championships also by winning at least three of the four distances, so the ranking could be affected by this.

Silver and bronze medals were awarded.
