= 1911 in sports =

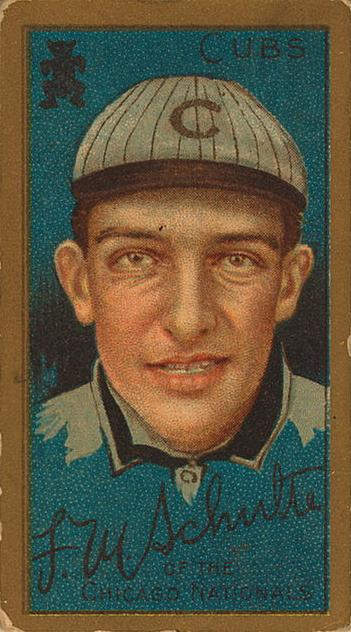
A cigarette card image of baseball star Frank Schulte, winner of the Chalmers Award in 1911

1911 in sports describes the year's events in world sport.

== American football ==
College championship

- College football national championship – Princeton Tigers

Events

- 25 November — the tradition of homecoming begins at the 1911 Kansas vs. Missouri football game.

== Association football ==
Australia

- The Commonwealth Football Association is founded as a governing body for the whole of Australia

Cyprus

- Anorthosis Famagusta FC founded (30 January)

Egypt

- Zamalek SC is founded at Gezira Island, Cairo as "Thakanat Qasr El-Nil Club" (5 January)

England

- The Football League – Manchester United 52 points, Aston Villa 51, Sunderland 45, Everton 45, Bradford City 45, The Wednesday 42
- FA Cup final – Bradford City 1–0 Newcastle United at Old Trafford, Manchester (replay following 0–0 draw at Crystal Palace)

Germany

- National Championship – Viktoria Berlin 3–1 VfB Leipzig at Dresden

Scotland

- Scottish Football League – Rangers
- Scottish Cup – Celtic 2–0 Hamilton Academical at Ibrox Park

== Australian rules football ==
VFL Premiership

- Essendon wins the 15th VFL Premiership: Essendon 5.11 (41) d Collingwood 4.11 (35) at Melbourne Cricket Ground (MCG)

== Bandy ==
Sweden

- Championship final – IFK Uppsala 6–0 Djurgårdens IF

== Baseball ==
World Series

- 14–26 October — Philadelphia Athletics (AL) defeats New York Giants (NL) to win the 1911 World Series by 4 games to 2

Events

- Chalmers Award – Frank Schulte, NL; Ty Cobb, AL

== Boxing ==
Events

- Monte Attell loses his World Bantamweight Championship to Frankie Conley, but Conley holds the title a matter of days before losing to Johnny Coulon

Lineal world champions

- World Heavyweight Championship – Jack Johnson
- World Light Heavyweight Championship – vacant
- World Middleweight Championship – vacant
- World Welterweight Championship – vacant
- World Lightweight Championship – Ad Wolgast
- World Featherweight Championship – Abe Attell
- World Bantamweight Championship – Monte Attell → Frankie Conley → Johnny Coulon

== Canadian football ==
- The Rugby Football Unions of Manitoba, Alberta and Saskatchewan unite into the Western Canada Rugby Football Union. The playoff series would see the champion of the MRFU host the champion of the SRFU, and ARFU would play against the victor. This was changed the next year
- Calgary, who won the western Canadian competition, issued a challenge to play for the Grey Cup, but was rejected due to the WCRFU not being a member of the Canadian Rugby Union
- Interprovincial Rugby Football Union - Toronto Argonauts
- Western Canada Rugby Football Union - Calgary Tigers
- Ontario Rugby Football Union - Hamilton Alerts
- Intercollegiate Rugby Football Union - University of Toronto
- 3rd Grey Cup – University of Toronto defeats Toronto Argonauts 14–7

== Cricket ==
Events

- Warwickshire wins its first-ever County Championship title, the first of the competition's "new clubs" to do so

England

- County Championship – Warwickshire
- Minor Counties Championship – Staffordshire
- Most runs – Phil Mead 2562 @ 54.51 (HS 223)
- Most wickets – Harry Dean 183 @ 17.43 (BB 9–109)
- Wisden Cricketers of the Year – Frank Foster, J W Hearne, Sep Kinneir, Phil Mead, Bert Strudwick

Australia

- Sheffield Shield – New South Wales
- Most runs – Aubrey Faulkner 1534 @ 59.00 (HS 204)
- Most wickets – Bill Whitty 70 @ 20.27 (BB 6–17)

India

- Bombay Triangular – Europeans shared with Hindus

New Zealand

- Plunket Shield – Canterbury

South Africa

- Currie Cup – Griqualand West

West Indies

- Inter-Colonial Tournament – Barbados

== Cycling ==
Tour de France

- Gustave Garrigou (France) wins the 9th Tour de France

== Figure skating ==
World Figure Skating Championships

- World Men's Champion – Ulrich Salchow (Sweden)
- World Women's Champion – Lily Kronberger (Hungary)
- World Pairs Champions – Ludowika Jakobsson-Eilers / Walter Jakobsson (Finland)

== Golf ==
Events

- John McDermott becomes both the first American-born man and the youngest golfer (19 years, 10 months) to win the US Open

Major tournaments

- British Open – Harry Vardon
- US Open – John McDermott

Other tournaments

- British Amateur – Harold Hilton
- US Amateur – Harold Hilton

== Horse racing ==
England

- Grand National – Glenside
- 1,000 Guineas Stakes – Atmah
- 2,000 Guineas Stakes – Sunstar
- The Derby – Sunstar
- The Oaks – Cherimoya
- St. Leger Stakes – Prince Palatine

Australia

- Melbourne Cup – The Parisian

Canada

- King's Plate – St. Bass

Ireland

- Irish Grand National – Reparator II
- Irish Derby Stakes – Shanballymore

USA

- Kentucky Derby – Meridian
- Preakness Stakes – Watervale
- Belmont Stakes – not contested due to anti-betting legislation in New York State

== Ice hockey ==
Stanley Cup

- March — Ottawa Hockey Club wins the National Hockey Association (NHA) championship and Stanley Cup
- 16 March — Ottawa forward Marty Walsh scores 10 goals in a 13–4 win over Port Arthur Seniors in a Stanley Cup challenge. His tally is second in Stanley Cup history to Frank McGee's 14-goal total on 16 January 1905.

Events

- March — Winnipeg Victorias wins the Allan Cup
- 13 November — NHA founding team Renfrew Creamery Kings drops out of the league and the players under contract are dispersed to other teams. Two franchises are sold to Toronto interests who intend to start in the 1911–12 season, but Toronto's new Arena Gardens is not ready for play.
- 7 December — upon completion of artificial ice rinks in Vancouver and Victoria, British Columbia, the new professional Pacific Coast Hockey Association (PCHA) league is created by former NHA players Frank and Lester Patrick. A bidding war for players ensues with numerous NHA players leaving to play in the PCHA.

== Rowing ==
The Boat Race

- 1 April — Oxford wins the 68th Oxford and Cambridge Boat Race

== Rugby league ==
- 1911 New Zealand rugby league tour of Australia
- 1911–12 Kangaroo tour of Great Britain

England

- Championship – Oldham
- Challenge Cup final – Broughton Rangers 4–0 Wigan at The Willows, Salford
- Lancashire League Championship – Wigan
- Yorkshire League Championship – Wakefield Trinity
- Lancashire County Cup – Oldham 4–3 Swinton
- Yorkshire County Cup – Wakefield Trinity 8–2 Huddersfield

Australia

- NSW Premiership – Eastern Suburbs 11–8 Glebe (grand final)

== Rugby union ==
Five Nations Championship

- 29th Five Nations Championship series is won by Wales who complete the inaugural Grand Slam by defeating all four of its opponents

== Speed skating ==
Speed Skating World Championships

- Men's All-round Champion – Nikolay Strunnikov (Russia)

== Tennis ==
Australia

- Australian Men's Singles Championship – Norman Brookes (Australia) defeats Horace Rice (Australia) 6–1 6–2 6–3

England

- Wimbledon Men's Singles Championship – Anthony Wilding (New Zealand) defeats Herbert Barrett (GB) 6–4 4–6 2–6 6–2 retired
- Wimbledon Women's Singles Championship – Dorothea Douglass Lambert Chambers (GB) defeats Dora Boothby (GB) 6–0 6–0

France

- French Men's Singles Championship – André Gobert (France) defeats Maurice Germot (France): details unknown
- French Women's Singles Championship – Jeanne Matthey defeats Marguerite Broquedis (France) (France): details unknown

USA

- American Men's Singles Championship – William Larned (USA) defeats Maurice McLoughlin (USA) 6–4 6–4 6–2
- American Women's Singles Championship – Hazel Hotchkiss Wightman (USA) defeats Florence Sutton (USA) 8–10 6–1 9–7

Davis Cup

- 1911 International Lawn Tennis Challenge – Australasia 4–0 United States at Lancaster Park (grass), Christchurch, New Zealand
