= When Harry Met Santa =

2021 advertisement

- Harry (left) and Santa Claus kissing
- Agency: POL
- Client: Posten Norge
- Language: Norwegian and English
- Release date: 22 November 2021
- Directed by: Sacarias Kiusalaas
- Produced by: Anisa Dzindo
- Country: Norway

When Harry Met Santa is a Christmas-themed advertisement for Posten Norge, the Norwegian postal service. It was released in November 2021 in advance of the 50th anniversary of the decriminalisation of sex between men in Norway in 2022.

== Content ==
The advert – which gets its title from the 1989 romantic comedy film When Harry Met Sally... – shows a man named Harry seeking a relationship with Santa Claus. Harry first sees Santa as when he delivers presents to his home one year, and their relationship develops year-on-year. Harry eventually writes a love letter to Santa, saying "all I want for Christmas is you", before he and Santa kiss each other. Santa then asks for help from Posten Norge, the Norwegian postal service, to deliver presents on his behalf on Christmas Eve, so he can spend more time with Harry, his new boyfriend.

== Reception ==
The advert quickly became a viral phenomenon worldwide, with most initial responses being "almost universally positive" and emotional in nature. It received positive responses from Canadian MP Randall Garrison and former U.S. ambassador to Denmark Rufus Gifford.

However, the advert was criticised for sexualising Santa by some critics in the United Kingdom, such as Dawn Neesom (a columnist for the Daily Star, a tabloid newspaper) and Melanie Blake (a commentator and author). Katie Edwards, a British author and academic, said in The Independent that such criticism was based on anti-gay tropes and the "villainisation of gay male sexuality", whereby two men kissing is seen as an inherently sexual act or behaviour, but a man and a woman kissing is not, as it is considered the norm by society. László Kövér, the speaker of the Hungarian National Assembly, accused the advert of desecrating Christmas.

The advert was not controversial in Norway and has been seen as an example of changing attitudes in the country as a result of campaigning by LGBT rights activists such as Kim Friele. This includes the decriminalisation of homosexuality in 1972 and the legalisation of same-sex marriage in 2009.

== See also ==
- Heterosexism – a system of attitudes, bias, and discrimination in favour of female–male sexuality and relationships
- Mrs. Claus – the traditional legendary wife of Santa Claus
- Santa's Husband – 2017 American children's picture book
- Section 213 of the Norwegian Penal Code – the Norwegian sodomy law that was repealed in 1972
- Snegurochka, or the Snow Maiden – the legendary granddaughter of Ded Moroz (Father Frost) in East Slavic nations
