= Get well soon =

Get well soon may refer to:

- Get Well Soon (mixtape), a 2002 mixtape by Kanye West
- "Get Well Soon" (song), a 2018 song by Ariana Grande
- Get Well Soon (band), a German band
- Get Well Soon (film), a 2014 French comedy film
- Get Well Soon (play), a play commissioned by Mikron Theatre Company for their 2018 season
- Get Well Soon (TV series), a British sitcom
- Get Well Soon, a 2001 American film starring Courteney Cox
- Get Well Soon: History's Worst Plagues and the Heroes Who Fought Them, a 2017 book by Jennifer Wright
- Get Well Soon (television series), a 2012 British children's television series on the CBeebies channel
