= Santa's Husband =

2017 children's book by Daniel Kibblesmith

- Front cover of an edition of Santa's Husband
- Author: Daniel Kibblesmith
- Illustrator: Ashley Perryman Quach
- Language: English
- Genre: Children's literature
- Publisher: HarperCollins
- Publication date: 10 October 2017; 9 years ago
- Publication place: United States
- Pages: 32
- ISBN: 978-0062748744
- Website: Official page

Santa's Husband is a holiday children's book with written by Daniel Kibblesmith and illustrated by Ashley Perryman Quach.

== Synopsis ==
Santa's Husband "tells the story of a black Santa Claus and his white husband who both live at the North Pole. Santa's spouse frequently fills in for his husband at malls." The book highlights various activities Santa and his husband experience, such as playing games and dancing.

== Background, development and publication history ==
In the wake of criticism hurled at Larry Jefferson's stint as Santa Claus in the Mall of America's Santa Experience during December 2016, Daniel Kibblesmith, staff writer for The Late Show with Stephen Colbert, had announced on his Twitter account that he and his then-fiancée now wife, Jennifer Wright, "[had] decided our future child will only know about Black Santa. If they see a white one we'll say 'That's his husband'." The tweet went viral with "8,400 likes and 3,300 retweets" and the eventual Los Angeles-based illustrator, Ashley Perryman Quach, responded with "boom. new children's book." Quach, who Kibblesmith had never met, later made a single copy of a Santa's Husband Christmas card, which Kibblesmith owns. Esquire noted that Quach's "illustrations tend to add a little bit of snark." Afterwards, "Kibblesmith brought the card and a brief pitch to his agent, who was shocked no one had ever done something similar before." While Kibblesmith had intended "a story strictly for children", his agent convinced him that it "should be for all ages". There was debate in the team between approaching the story as a "narrative like 'The Night Before Christmas.' Or...incredibly straight-forward Kid's First Book About Santa."

On Tuesday, March 28, 2017, Harper Design, an imprint of HarperCollin's Publishing, confirmed the release of the book for October 10. On December 17, both author and illustrator were interviewed by Victor Blackwell on CNN's New Day Weekend, where Kibblesmith commented that his inspiration came from "the annual tradition we have in this country of pretending that there is a giant 'War on Christmas'...and reading [on] the Mall of America hiring a black Santa Claus." As such the book is also, "in part, inspired by Megyn Kelly's comments on her Fox News show in December 2013 where she vehemently said that Santa was white in response to an article claiming that Santa shouldn't be white anymore because that excludes non-white children." After the book's release Kibblesmith stated that copies had been sent to Kelly as part of media outreach and expressed "[he] would be extremely interested in coming on her show, and having the actual conversation about it." Kibblesmith told Paste, "Megyn, if you're reading this, I would love to come do your show. I think it would be really cathartic."

The book "is meant for all ages", yet its suggested reading audience is children between the ages of 4 and 8. Kibblesmith has stated that he and Quach "were very careful not to have anything offensive in the book". According to journalist Rex Huppke, the book aims to show how Santa and his husband's day-to-day life is different, yet similar to depictions in traditional Christmas books.

== Reception ==
Even before the release of the book, Santa's Husband was the subject of criticism and Kibblesmith and Quach were both "trolled" on sites such as Gab and The Daily Stormer. Kibblesmith allegedly "found his picture on a white supremacist's blog trying to 'out' him as Jewish," since his "Jewish mother and non-Jewish father...celebrated [every year] Christmas and Santa Claus brought us presents." Kibblesmith has reacted by stating that the majority of criticism "come from the general uneasiness of change... I disagree with their reaction, but also, part of me wants to comfort them."

Some reviewers on Amazon have criticized the book as "brainwashing children with degeneracy", yet according to Kibblesmith, "more people seem to love it than hate it", at a rate of "80% of the people who hear about the book LOVE IT. And the other 20% are not giving it a chance because they're uninformed." Far-right activist Laura Loomer criticized CNN for the segment, tweeting, "@CNN is really trying to mke "Santa's Husband" a thing for children...", sentiments which were shared by WorldNetDaily, who tweeted "[Degeneracy intensifies]." The Chicago Tribune noted that "[w]hat it's really about is accepting that every family sees Christmas in a different way." As the book has received praise for its inclusion of a Santa Claus in a gay relationship, Kibblesmith "hopes Santa's Husband goes beyond just this one fictional character and helps lead the way for more diverse representation."

The reception on Santa's Husband is divided along political lines. Dana Schwartz of the New York Observer analyzes tweets to reveal a negative viewpoint on Santa's Husband, held mainly by conservatives.

== See also ==
- When Harry Met Santa
