= 1913 World Allround Speed Skating Championships =

International speed skating competition

World Allround Speed Skating Championships
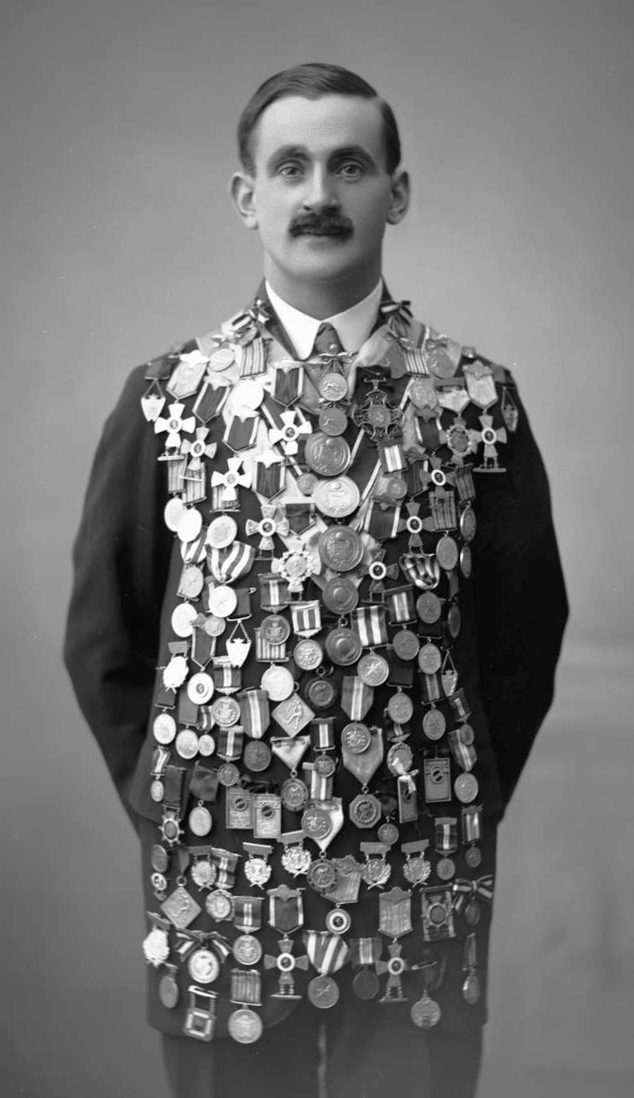
- Oscar Mathisen World champion 1913
- Venue: Pohjoissatama, Helsinki, Finland
- Dates: 1–2 March
- Competitors: 15 from 5 nations

Medalist men
1st place, gold medalist(s)		Oscar Mathisen	NOR
2nd place, silver medalist(s)		Vasili Ippolitov	RUS
3rd place, bronze medalist(s)		Nikita Naydenov	RUS

The 1913 World Allround Speed Skating Championships took place at 1 and 2 March 1913 at the ice rink Pohjoissatama in Helsinki, Finland.

Oscar Mathisen was defending champion and succeeded in prolonging his title. Oscar Mathisen became World champion for the fourth time. He is the first ice-skater winning the World championship four times.

== Allround results ==
Place	Athlete	Country	Points	500m	5000m	1500m	10000m
1st place, gold medalist(s)	Oscar Mathisen	Norway	6	46.0 (1)	8:56.1 (2)	2:24.4 (1)	18:04.9 (2)
2nd place, silver medalist(s)	Vasili Ippolitov	Russia	15	50.1 (12)	8:43.4 (1)	2:26.3 (2)	17:37.8 (1)
3rd place, bronze medalist(s)	Nikita Naydenov	Russia	20	49.5 (10)	9:08.7 (4)	2:29.3 (3)	18:30.5 (4)
4	Henning Olsen	Norway	24	47.2 (2)	9:27.8 (8)	2:30.9 (6)	19:16.6 (8)
5	Väinö Wickström	Finland	24,5	48.9 (5)	9:12.0 (5)	2:31.6 (9)	18:35.2 (5)
6	Platon Ippolitov	Russia	28	51.0 (13)	9:01.7 (3)	2:32.6 (10)	18:08.0 (3)
7	Petrus Axelson	Sweden	30	49.9 (11)	9:21.4 (6)	2:31.4 (7)	18:45.4 (7)
8	Gunnar Strömstén	Finland	31	55.0 (15)*	9:21.7 (7)	2:30.2 (4)	18:35.6 (6)
9	Bjarne Frang	Norway	34	47.4 (3)	9:44.7 (13)	2:30.5 (5)	19:47.0 (13)
10	Arvo Tuomainen	Finland	36	49.0 (7)	9:28.5 (9)	2:33.3 (11)	19:17.3 (9)
11	Martin Sæterhaug	Norway	38	48.0 (4)	9:36.2 (12)	2:31.5 (8)	19:48.2 (14)
12	Walter Tverin	Finland	39,5	48.9 (5)	9:35.4 (11)	2:34.3 (12)	19:24.7 (11)
13	Nikolay Rundyaltsev	Russia	43	49.1 (8)	9:29.7 (10)	2:35.3 (13)	19:36.4 (12)
14	Yevgeni Korolyov	Russia	51	51.3 (14)	9:53.2 (14)	2:40.7 (14)	19:18.2 (10)
NC	Lauri Helanterä	Finland	–	49.2 (9)	9:56.5 (15)	NS	NS

* = Fell
NC = Not classified
NF = Not finished
NS = Not started
DQ = Disqualified

Source: SpeedSkatingStats.com

== Rules ==
Four distances have to be skated:

- 500m
- 1500m
- 5000m
- 10000m

The ranking was made by award ranking points. The points were awarded to the skaters who had skated all the distances. The final ranking was then decided by ordering the skaters by lowest point totals.

- 1 point for 1st place
- 2 point for 2nd place
- 3 point for 3rd place
- and so on

One could win the World Championships also by winning at least three of the four distances, so the ranking could be affected by this.

Silver and bronze medals were awarded.
