= 1910 World Allround Speed Skating Championships =

International speed skating competition

World Allround Speed Skating Championships
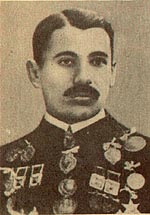
- Nikolay Strunnikov World champion 1910
- Venue: Pohjoissatama, Helsinki, Finland
- Dates: 5–6 March
- Competitors: 12 from 4 nations

Medalist men
1st place, gold medalist(s)		Nikolay Strunnikov	RUS
2nd place, silver medalist(s)		Oscar Mathisen	NOR
3rd place, bronze medalist(s)		Martin Sæterhaug	NOR

The 1910 World Allround Speed Skating Championships took place on 5 and 6 March 1910 at the ice rink Pohjoissatama in Helsinki, Finland.

Oscar Mathisen was the defending champion. Nikolay Strunnikov had the fewest points awarded and became world champion.

== Allround results ==
Place	Athlete	Country	Points	500m	5000m	10000m	1500m
1st place, gold medalist(s)	Nikolay Strunnikov	Russia	9	49.3 (3)	9:31.8 (3)	18:34.0 (1)	2:33.0 (2)
2nd place, silver medalist(s)	Oscar Mathisen	Norway	10	46.3 (1)	9:30.6 (2)	19:18.0 (6)	2:32.6 (1)
3rd place, bronze medalist(s)	Martin Sæterhaug	Norway	14	47.8 (2)	9:32.0 (4)	19:17.6 (5)	2:35.2 (3)
4	Magnus Johansen	Norway	15	51.0 (10)	9:27.9 (1)	18:57.2 (2)	2:39.1 (4)
5	Väinö Wickström	Finland	18	49.5 (4)	9:44.0 (6)	19:08.8 (3)	2:39.2 (5)
6	Jevgeni Boernov	Russia	26	54.5 (12)	9:37.0 (5)	19:15.8 (4)	2:42.2 (7)
7	Björn Damstén	Finland	28	49.8 (6)	9:45.8 (7)	19:33.8 (8)	2:43.0 (8)
8	Gunnar Strömstén	Finland	28	50.4 (9)	9:46.2 (8)	19:24.5 (7)	2:39.4 (6)
9	Thomas Bohrer	Austria	33	50.3 (8)	10:01.1 (10)	19:58.4 (9)	2:44.3 (9)
10	Birger Carlsson	Sweden	39	53.8 (11)	10:18.8 (11)	20:00.0 (10)	2:52.6 (10)
NC	Jussi Wiinikainen	Finland	–	49.7 (5)	9:57.2 (9)	NS	NS
NC	Johan Vikander	Finland	–	49.9 (7)	NF	NS	NS

* = Fell
NC = Not classified
NF = Not finished
NS = Not started
DQ = Disqualified

Source: SpeedSkatingStats.com

== Rules ==
Four distances have to be skated:

- 500m
- 1500m
- 5000m
- 10000m

The ranking was made by award ranking points. The points were awarded to the skaters who had skated all the distances. The final ranking was then decided by ordering the skaters by lowest point totals.

- 1 point for 1st place
- 2 point for 2nd place
- 3 point for 3rd place
- and so on

One could win the World Championships also by winning at least three of the four distances, so the ranking could be affected by this.

Silver and bronze medals were awarded.
