= 1908 World Allround Speed Skating Championships =

International speed skating competition

World Allround Speed Skating Championships
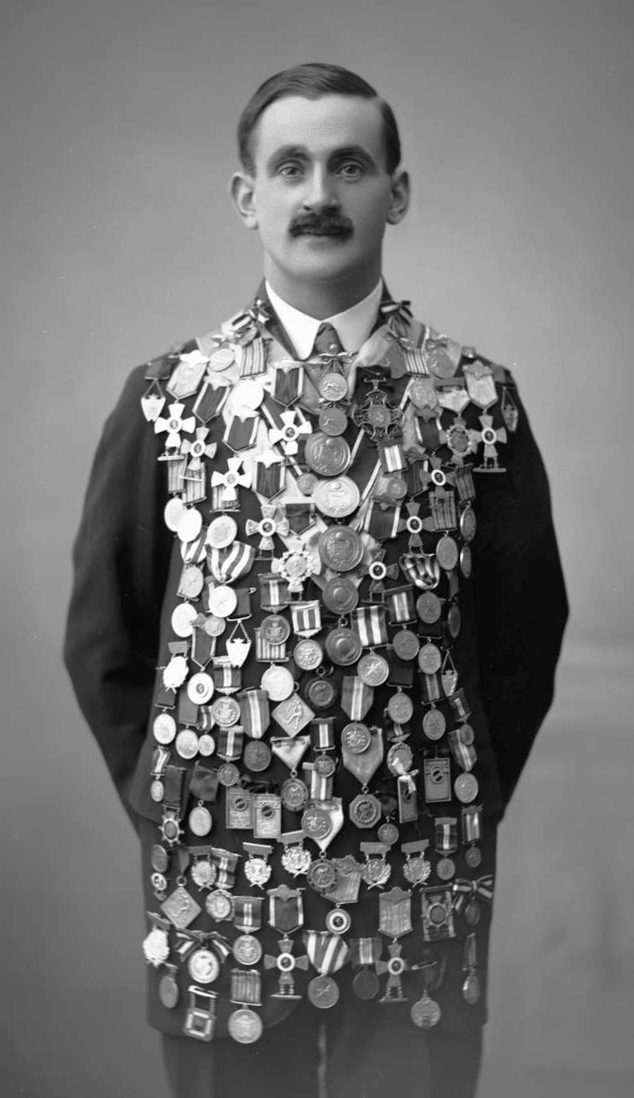
- Oscar Mathisen World champion 1908
- Venue: Eisstadion, Davos, Switzerland
- Dates: 8–9 February
- Competitors: 15 from 7 nations

Medalist men
1st place, gold medalist(s)		Oscar Mathisen	NOR
2nd place, silver medalist(s)		Martin Sæterhaug	NOR
3rd place, bronze medalist(s)		Moje Öholm	SWE

The 1908 World Allround Speed Skating Championships took place at 8 and 9 February 1908 at the ice rink Eisstadion in Davos, Switzerland. THis year it was the first time also Silver and Bronze medals were awarded. Also a point system was introduced to make a ranking, but the rule that if one won three distances became automatic World champion was still valid.

There was no defending champion. Oscar Mathisen won three distances and became World champion. He also had the lowest number of points awarded.

== Allround results ==
Place	Athlete	Country	Points	500m	5000m	1500m	10000m
1st place, gold medalist(s)	Oscar Mathisen	Norway	13	54.4 (14)*	8:55.4 (1)	2:20.8 (1)	18:01.8 (1)
2nd place, silver medalist(s)	Martin Sæterhaug	Norway	13,5	46.2 (4)	9:04.4 (4)	2:23.4 (2)	18:28.6 (5)
3rd place, bronze medalist(s)	Moje Öholm	Sweden	15	45.2 (2)	9:04.8 (5)	2:23.6 (4)	18:30.2 (6)
4	Gunnar Strömstén	Finland	16	47.2 (7)	9:01.6 (3)	2:25.4 (7)	18:04.0 (2)
5	Antti Wiklund	Finland	16	47.4 (8)	9:01.4 (2)	2:24.2 (5)	18:24.0 (4)
6	Thomas Bohrer	Austria	19,5	46.2 (4)	9:42.8 (8)	2:27.6 (9)	18:21.2 (3)
7	Arne Schrey	Finland	23	46.4 (6)	9:07.6 (6)	2:24.4 (6)	18:55.2 (8)
8	Jean Pettersson	Sweden	30	48.4 (10)	9:53.0 (9)	2:29.8 (11)	18:53.0 (7)
9	Ejnar Sørensen	Denmark	36	49.6 (11)	10:26.4 (15)*	2:34.0 (13)	19:07.4 (9)
10	Frederick Dix	United Kingdom	38	51.6 (13)	9:54.0 (10)	2:35.0 (14)	19:11.4 (10)
NC	Johan Vikander	Finland	–	44.8 (1)	9:20.6 (7)	2:23.4 (2)	NS
NC	Sigurd Mathisen	Norway	–	45.4 (3)	9:56.4 (11)	2:26.2 (8)	NS
NC	Franz Wathén	Finland	–	47.4 (8)	10:00.8 (12)	2:27.8 (10)	NS
NC	Franz Schilling	Austria	–	50.4 (12)	10:07.2 (13)	2:32.0 (12)	NS
NC	Henny Kalt	Netherlands	–	NF	10:18.6 (14)	NS	NS

* = Fell
NC = Not classified
NF = Not finished
NS = Not started
DQ = Disqualified

Source: SpeedSkatingStats.com

== Rules ==
Four distances have to be skated:

- 500m
- 1500m
- 5000m
- 10000m

The ranking was made by award ranking points. The points were awarded to the skaters who had skated all the distances. The final ranking was then decided by ordering the skaters by lowest point totals.

- 1 point for 1st place
- 2 point for 2nd place
- 3 point for 3rd place
- and so on

One could win the World Championships also by winning at least three of the four distances, so the ranking could be affected by this.

Silver and bronze medals were awarded.
