= Norwegian of the Century =

2005 Norwegian public opinion poll

Norwegian of the Century (Norwegian: Århundrets nordmann) was a poll carried out by the Norwegian Broadcasting Corporation in 2005, the 100-year anniversary of Norwegian independence. The poll was SMS-based and over 400,000 Norwegians voted over the course of the year. To qualify as "Norwegian of the Century", the nominee must have lived between 1905 and 2005. All Norwegians were eligible for nomination, and there were initially 600 people on the list. A "Great Norwegian Committee" (Store Norske komiteen) consisting of Nils Arne Eggen, Astrid Nøklebye Heiberg, Guri Hjeltnes, Harald Norvik, Erling Sandmo and Cathrine Sandnes narrowed the list down to 50. Another poll was conducted, again SMS-based, with the results presented live on NRK1 on 17 December 2005. The winner, with 41% of the vote, was King Olav V. Former Prime Minister Einar Gerhardsen was second with 24%, followed by Erik Bye with 15%. The results for the top 50 spots were as follows:

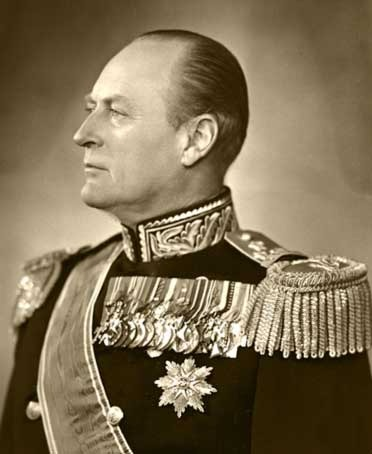
King Olav V

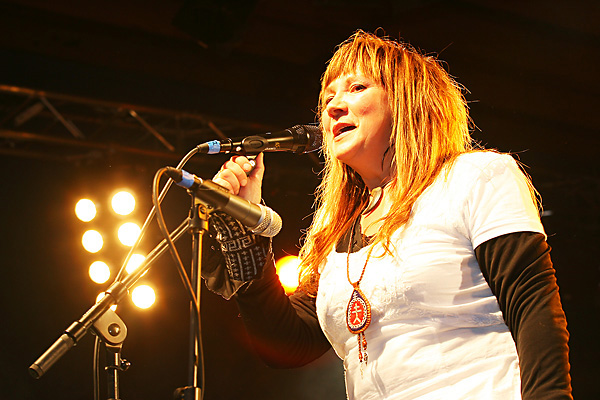
Mari Boine

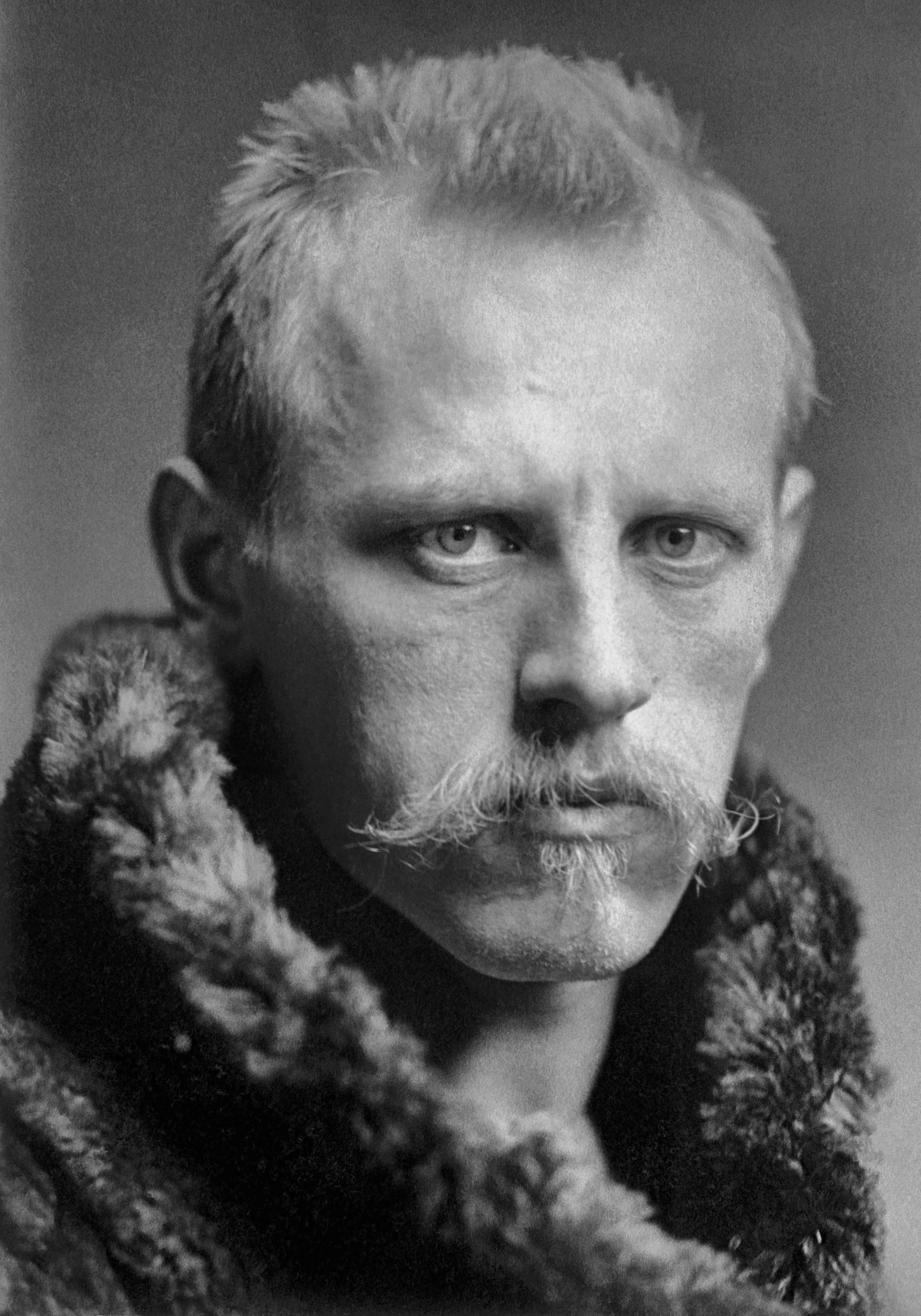
Fridtjof Nansen

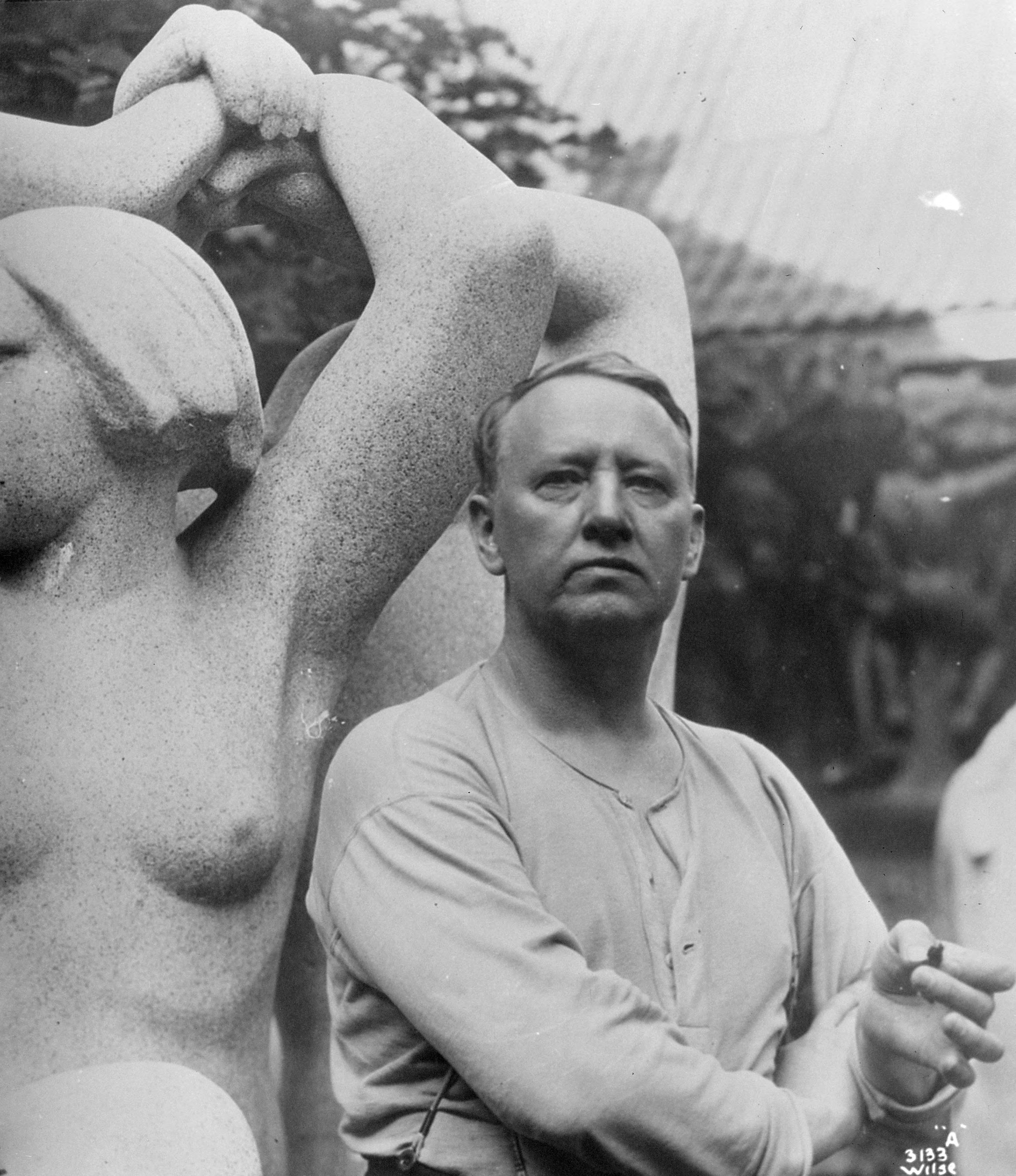
Gustav Vigeland

1. Olav V (1903–1991) – King of Norway (21 September 1957 – 17 January 1991)
2. Einar Gerhardsen (1897–1987) – politician and Prime Minister of Norway (1945–1951, 1955–1963, 1963–1965)
3. Erik Bye (1926–2004) – journalist, artist, author, film actor, folk singer and radio and television personality
4. Kim Friele (1935–2021) – gay rights and human rights activist
5. Thor Heyerdahl (1914–2002) – ethnographer, led Kon-Tiki expedition
6. Mari Boine (1956–) – Norwegian Sami musician
7. Gro Harlem Brundtland (1939–) – politician and 22nd Prime Minister of Norway (1981, 1986–1989, 1990–1996)
8. Haakon VII (1872–1957) – King of Norway (18 November 1905 – 21 September 1957)
9. Christian Michelsen (1857–1925) – shipping magnate, statesman, and 1st Prime Minister of Norway (1905–1907)
10. Fridtjof Nansen (1861–1930) – explorer, diplomat, and Nobel Peace Prize laureate
11. Ivar Asbjørn Følling (1888–1973) – physicist and biochemist known for describing the disease commonly known as Følling's disease or phenylketonuria
12. Grete Waitz (1953–2011) – marathon runner, first woman to run a marathon in under two and a half hours
13. Alf Prøysen (1914–1970) – author, poet, playwright and musician
14. Helge Ingstad (1899–2001) and Anne Stine Ingstad (1918–1997) – archaeologists and explorers of a Norse settlement at L'Anse aux Meadows in 1960
15. Anne-Cath. Vestly (1920–2008) – author of children's literature
16. Gunnar Sønsteby (1918–2012) – member of the Norwegian resistance movement during the German occupation of Norway in World War II.
17. Knut Hamsun (1859–1952) – writer, Nobel laureate in Literature
18. Kjell Aukrust (1920–2002) – author and poet
19. Eivind Berggrav (1884–1959) – Lutheran bishop, figure in resistance against German occupation of Norway
20. Kirsten Flagstad (1859–1962) – opera singer and dramatic soprano
21. Ole Gunnar Solskjær (1973–) – football player and manager
22. Hjalmar Andersen (1923–2013) – speed skater, won three gold medals at the 1952 Winter Olympic Games held in Oslo, Norway
23. Edvard Munch (1863–1944) – painter and print-maker, best known for painting The Scream
24. Bjørn Dæhlie (1967–) – cross–country skier, won a total of 29 medals in the Olympics and World Championships from 1991 and 1999
25. Carl Joachim Hambro (1885–1964) – journalist, author and politician
26. Katti Anker Møller (1868–1945) – feminist, children's rights advocate, reproductive rights activist
27. Kristian Ottosen (1921–2006) – non–fiction writer and public servant
28. Rosemarie Köhn (1939–2022) – bishop in the Diocese of Hamar of the Church of Norway
29. Bjørn Wirkola (1943–) – ski jumper
30. Sam Eyde (1866–1940) – engineer and industrialist
31. Olav Selvaag (1912–2002) – residential contractor, responsible for innovative design for building affordable housing in Post–World War II economic expansion
32. Arne Arnardo (1912–1995) – circus performer, generally known as the "circus king" of Norway
33. Karl Evang (1902–1981) – physician and civil servant
34. Thorbjørn Egner (1912–1990) – playwright and songwriter for children
35. Halldis Moren Vesaas (1907–1995) – poet for children
36. Jan Garbarek (1947–) – jazz saxophonist
37. Finn Lied (1916–2014) – military researcher and politician
38. Sigrid Undset (1882–1949) – novelist, Nobel laureate in Literature
39. Wenche Foss (1917–2011) – actress of stage, screen, and television
40. Erling Stordahl (1923–1994) – farmer and singer
41. Oscar Mathisen (1888–1954) – speed skater
42. Sonja Henie (1912–1969) – figure skater and film star
43. Arne Nordheim (1931–2010) – composer
44. Trygve Lie (1896–1968) – politician, Minister of Foreign Affairs (1940–1946) and 1st Secretary-General of the United Nations (1946–1952)
45. Inger Hagerup (1905–1985) – poet
46. Johs Andenæs (1912–2003) – jurist
47. Liv Ullmann (1938–) – actress and film director
48. Ragnar Frisch (1895–1973) – economist, being one of the founders of the discipline of econometrics, and for coining the widely used term pair macroeconomics/microeconomics in 1933; awarded Nobel Memorial Prize in Economic Sciences in 1968
49. Gustav Vigeland (1869–1943) – sculptor
50. Francis Bull (1887–1974) – literary historian
