= 1904 World Allround Speed Skating Championships =

International speed skating competition

World Allround Speed Skating Championships
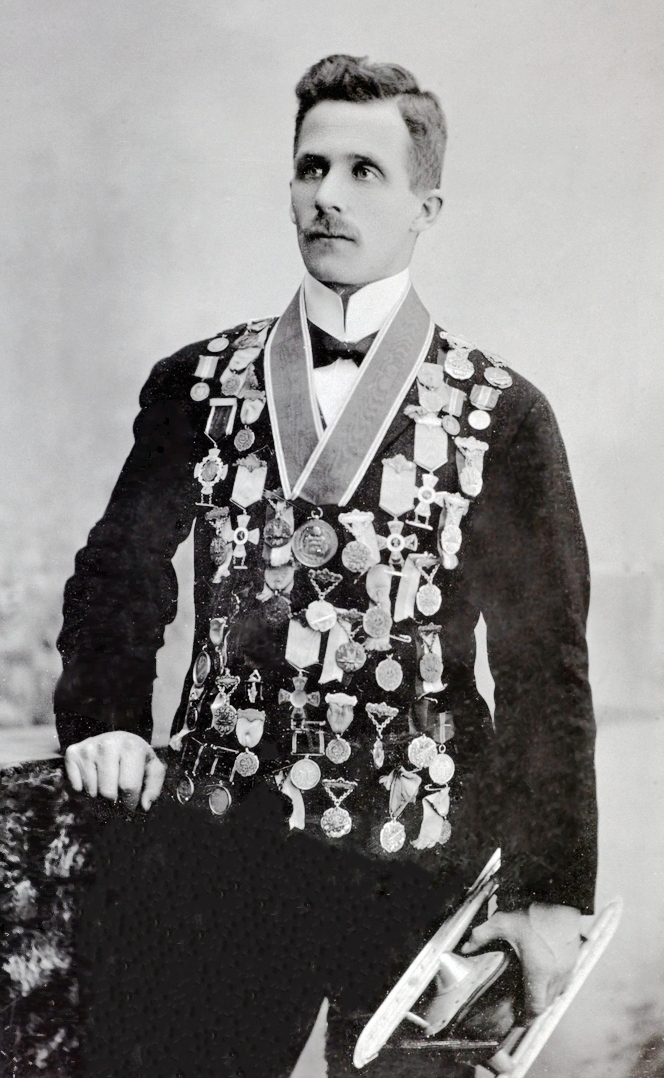
- Petter Sinnerud; Disqualified at the 1904 World Championship
- Venue: Gamle Frogner Stadion, Kristiania, Norway
- Dates: 6–7 February
- Competitors: 14 from 1 nations

Medalist men
1st place, gold medalist(s)		Sigurd Mathisen	NOR

The 1904 World Allround Speed Skating Championships took place at 6 and 7 February 1904 at the ice rink Gamle Frogner Stadion in Kristiania, Norway.

There was no defending champion. Petter Sinnerud won all four distances and became World Champion, but after it was found that he had once participated in a professional match in the United States, against the rules of the ISU, he was disqualified. Sigurd Mathisen, who originally came second, was declared World Champion.

== Allround results ==
Place	Athlete	Country	500m	5000m	1500m	10000m
1st place, gold medalist(s)	Sigurd Mathisen	Norway	48.2 (2)	9:28.2 (1)	2:35.8 (1)	19:31.0 (1)
NC2	Rudolf Gundersen	Norway	46.6 (1)	9:37.6 (4)	2:35.8 (1)	19:47.4 (2)
NC3	Rudolf Røhne	Norway	49.0 (3)	9:55.0 (6)	2:39.0 (3)	19:58.6 (4)
NC4	Olaf Hansen	Norway	51.2 (5)	9:31.2 (2)	2:43.4 (4)	19:54.6 (3)
NC	Magnus Johansen	Norway	53.0 (8)	10:10.2 (8)	2:59.2 (10)	NS
NC	Thor Poulsen	Norway	56.4 (10)*	10:29.0 (12)	2:48.8 (7)	NS
NC	Dagfinn Klaussen	Norway	51.6 (6)	9:55.0 (6)	2:45.6 (5)	NS
NC	Nils Gundersen	Norway	54.9 (9)	9:49.8 (5)	2:47.0 (6)	NS
NC	Johan Kaspersen	Norway	1:00.4 (11)*	10:53.0 (13)	3:01.2 (11)	NS
NC	Olaf Johansen	Norway	NF	10:14.4 (11)	2:50.2 (8)	NS
NC	Olaf Johansen	Norway	51.8 (7)	10:13.4 (10)	NF	NS
NC	Oluf Steen	Norway	49.2 (4)	9:36.0 (3)	NS	NS
NC	Julius Hansen	Norway	NS	10:10.8 (9)	2:54.6 (9)	19:58.6 (4)
DQ	Petter Sinnerud	Norway	46.2 (DQ)	9:26.4 (DQ)	2:34.8 (DQ)	19:15.2 (DQ)

* = Fell
NC = Not classified
NF = Not finished
NS = Not started
DQ = Disqualified

Source: SpeedSkatingStats.com

== Rules ==
Four distances have to be skated:

- 500m
- 1500m
- 5000m
- 10000m

One could only win the World Championships by winning at least three of the four distances, so there would be no World Champion if no skater won at least three distances.

Silver and bronze medals were not awarded.
