= Olav V =

King of Norway from 1957 to 1991

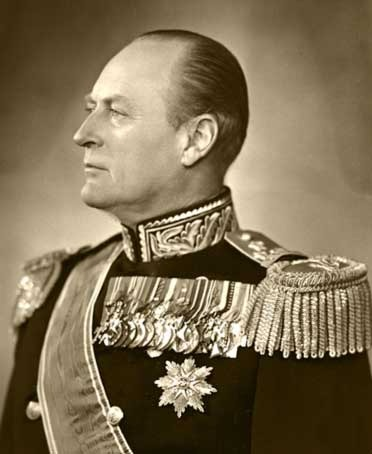
- Official portrait, 1957

King of Norway
- Reign: 21 September 1957 – 17 January 1991
- Benediction: 22 June 1958; Nidaros Cathedral
- Predecessor: Haakon VII
- Successor: Harald V
- Regent: Harald (1990–1991)

Regent of Norway
- Regency: 1 July 1955 – 21 September 1957
- Monarch: Haakon VII
- Born: Prince Alexander Edward Christian Frederik of Denmark; 2 July 1903; Appleton House, Sandringham, England
- Died: 17 January 1991 (aged 87); The Royal Lodge, Holmenkollen, Oslo, Norway
- Burial: 30 January 1991; Royal Mausoleum, Akershus Castle, Oslo
- Spouse: Märtha of Sweden (m. 1929; died 1954)
- Issue: Princess Ragnhild, Mrs. Lorentzen; Princess Astrid, Mrs. Ferner; Harald V
- House: Glücksburg
- Father: Haakon VII
- Mother: Maud of Wales
- Religion: Church of Norway
- Sports career
Medal record
Sailing
Representing Norway
Olympic Games
Gold medal – first place	1928 Amsterdam	6 m mixed
5.5 Metre World Championship
Bronze medal – third place	1971 Seawanhaka	5.5m
Bronze medal – third place	1976 Hankø	5.5m

Olav V (born Prince Alexander of Denmark; 2 July 1903 – 17 January 1991) was King of Norway from 1957 until his death in 1991.

Olav was born on the royal Sandringham Estate in England, the only child of Prince Carl of Denmark and Princess Maud of Wales. He became heir apparent to the Norwegian throne when his father was elected King Haakon VII of Norway in 1905. He was the first heir to the Norwegian throne to be brought up in Norway since Olav IV in the 14th century, and his parents made sure that he was given as Norwegian an upbringing as possible. In preparation for his future role, he attended both civilian and military schools. In 1929, he married his first cousin, Princess Märtha of Sweden. During World War II, his leadership was much appreciated, and he was appointed Norwegian Chief of Defence in 1944. Olav became king following the death of his father in 1957.

His considerate, down-to-earth style made Olav immensely popular, resulting in the nickname Folkekongen ('The People's King'). In a 2005 poll by the Norwegian Broadcasting Corporation, Olav was voted "Norwegian of the Century".

== Birth and early life ==
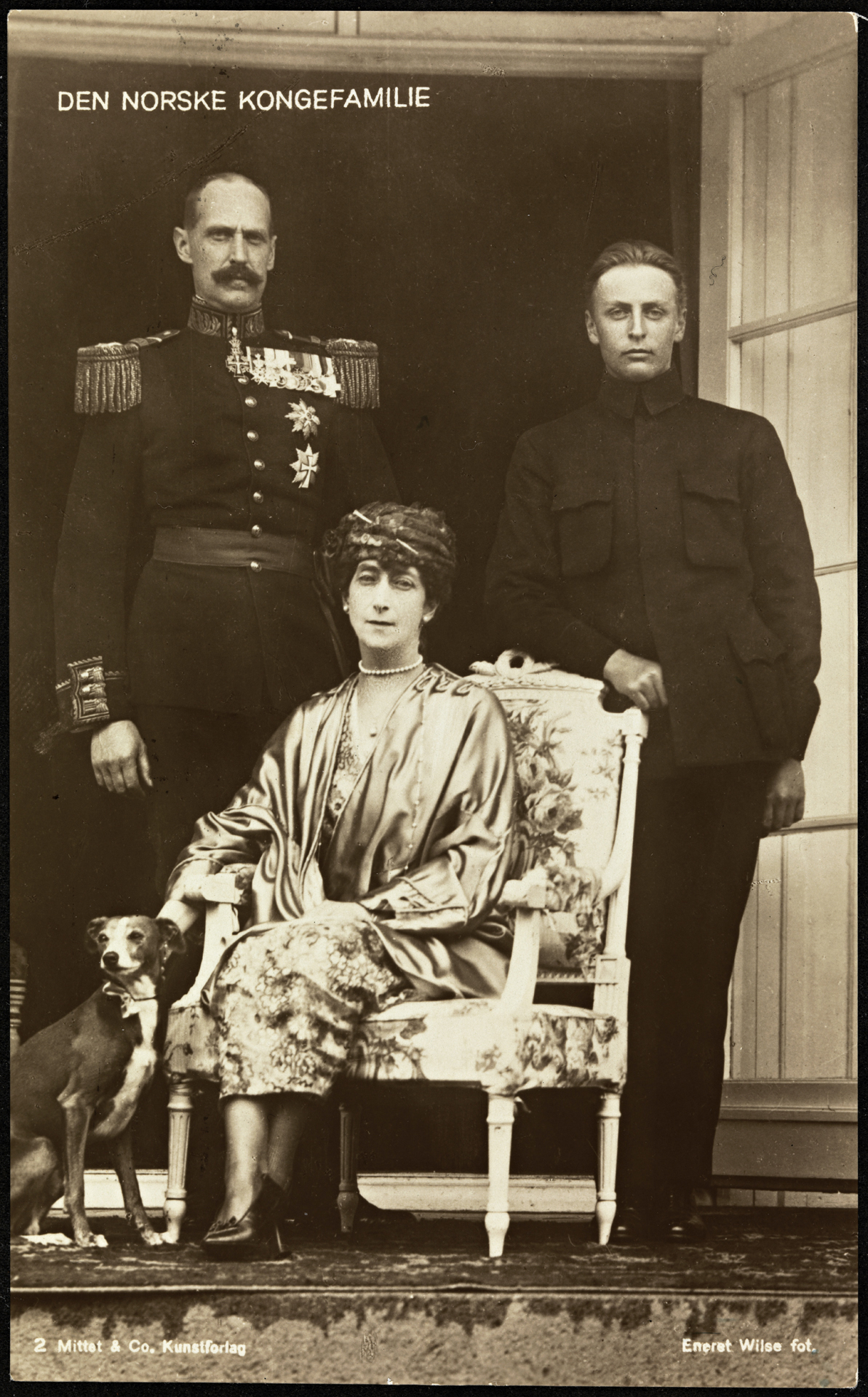
The Norwegian royal family in 1921

Olav was born on 2 July 1903 as Prince Alexander Edward Christian Frederik in Appleton House on the royal Sandringham Estate, Flitcham, United Kingdom. His parents were Prince Carl, second son of Crown Prince Frederick of Denmark (later King Frederick VIII), and Princess Maud, youngest daughter of King Edward VII of the United Kingdom, who was the eldest son of Britain's Queen Victoria.

He was baptised on 11 August 1903 at St Mary Magdalene Church, Sandringham, by Canon Frederick Hervey, domestic chaplain to his grandfather, King Edward VII, and rector of Sandringham. His godparents were: his maternal grandparents, King Edward VII and Queen Alexandra; his paternal grandparents, Crown Prince Frederick and Crown Princess Louise; his great-grandfather, King Christian IX of Denmark; his maternal uncle, George, Prince of Wales; and his maternal aunt, Princess Victoria.

In 1905, Carl was elected as Norway's first independent king in 518 years. The fact that Carl already had a son gave him an advantage over the other candidates, as it assured the continuance of the new royal line. When Carl accepted his election, he took the name Haakon VII. The king gave his two-year-old son the Norwegian name Olav after Olav Haakonsson, the last independent king of Norway before its union with Denmark. It was also chosen in honour of Saint Olaf, the first effective king of Norway and a symbol of Norwegian independence and pride.

Olav was thus the first heir to the throne since the Middle Ages to have been raised in Norway, and his parents went to considerable length to give him as Norwegian an upbringing as possible. Having been baptised in the Church of England, he was confirmed in the evangelical Lutheran Church of Norway on 1 December 1918 at Slottskapellet.

Unlike his father, who was a naval officer, Olav chose to complete his main military education in the army. He graduated from the three-year Norwegian Military Academy in 1924, with the fourth-best score in his class. Olav then studied jurisprudence and economics for two years at Balliol College, Oxford.

During the 1930s, Crown Prince Olav was a naval cadet serving on the minelayer/cadet training ship Olav Tryggvason. Olav moved up the ranks of the Norwegian armed forces in the army from an initial rank of first lieutenant to captain in 1931 and colonel in 1936.

He was an accomplished athlete. Olav jumped from the Holmenkollen ski jump in Oslo and competed in sailing regattas. He won a gold medal in sailing at the 1928 Summer Olympics in Amsterdam and remained an active sailor into old age.

On 21 March 1929 in Oslo, he married his first cousin Princess Märtha of Sweden with whom he had two daughters, Ragnhild and Astrid, and one son, Harald. As exiles during World War II, Crown Princess Märtha and the royal children lived in Washington, DC, where she struck up a close friendship with Franklin Roosevelt. She died in 1954, before her husband ascended the throne.

The British Film Institute houses an early film, made in 1913, in which a miniature car (a "baby Cadillac") commissioned by Queen Alexandra for Crown Prince Olav tows a procession of Londoners through the streets of the capital, before being delivered to a pair of "royal testers" of roughly Olav's age. The car is a battery-powered, one-third size replica on a four-foot wheelbase, and is on permanent loan to the Norsk Teknisk Museum in Oslo.

== World War II ==
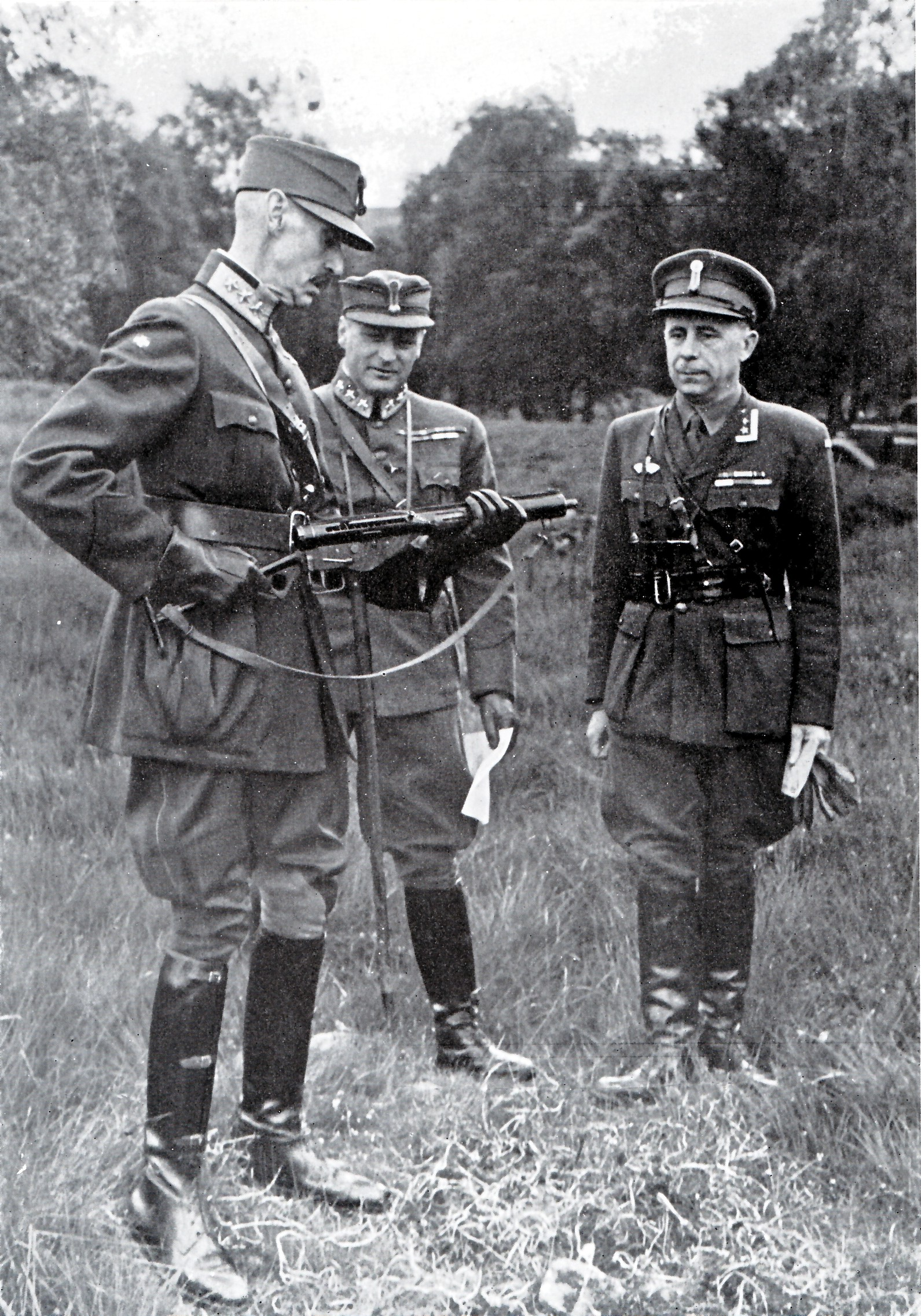
King Haakon VII, Crown Prince Olav, and Hans Reidar Holtermann in Scotland during World War II (circa 1943)

As Crown Prince, Olav had received extensive military training and had participated in most major Norwegian military exercises. That made him perhaps one of the most knowledgeable Norwegian military leaders, and he was respected by other Allied leaders for his knowledge and leadership skills. During a visit to the United States before the war, he and his wife had established a close relationship with President Roosevelt. Those factors would prove to be important for the Norwegian fight against the attacking German forces. In 1939, Crown Prince Olav was appointed an admiral of the Royal Norwegian Navy and a general of the Norwegian Army.

During World War II, Olav stood by his father's side in resisting the German occupation of Norway. During the campaign he was a valuable advisor both to civilian and military leaders. When the Norwegian government decided to go into exile, he offered to stay behind with the Norwegian people, but that was declined. He reluctantly followed his father to the United Kingdom, where he and his staff and servants and aides continued to be a key advisor to the government-in-exile and his father. One source states that Olav helped "to build and lead a free fighting force" and made radio broadcasts in England.

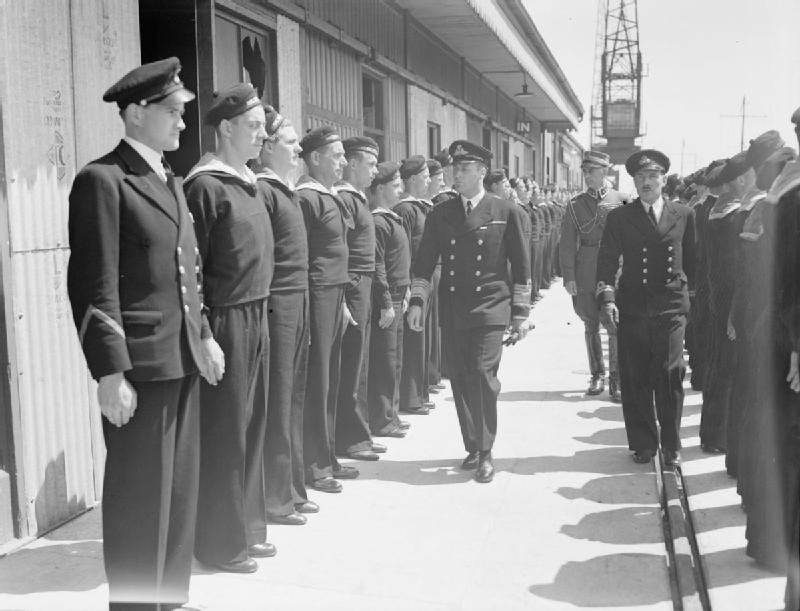
Olav inspecting Norwegian sailors in the United Kingdom

Olav made several visits to Norwegian and Allied troops in the United Kingdom, Canada and the United States. In 1944, he was appointed to the post of Norwegian Chief of Defence and after the war he led the Norwegian disarmament of the German occupying forces. On 13 May 1945, Crown Prince Olav and five government ministers returned to a liberated Norway. The arrival was documented in a newsreel by British Pathé News.

His war decorations from other nations, including the War Crosses of Norway, France, Greece and the Netherlands; the US Legion of Merit; and the French Médaille Militaire, are testament to the international recognition of his contribution to the war against Nazi Germany.

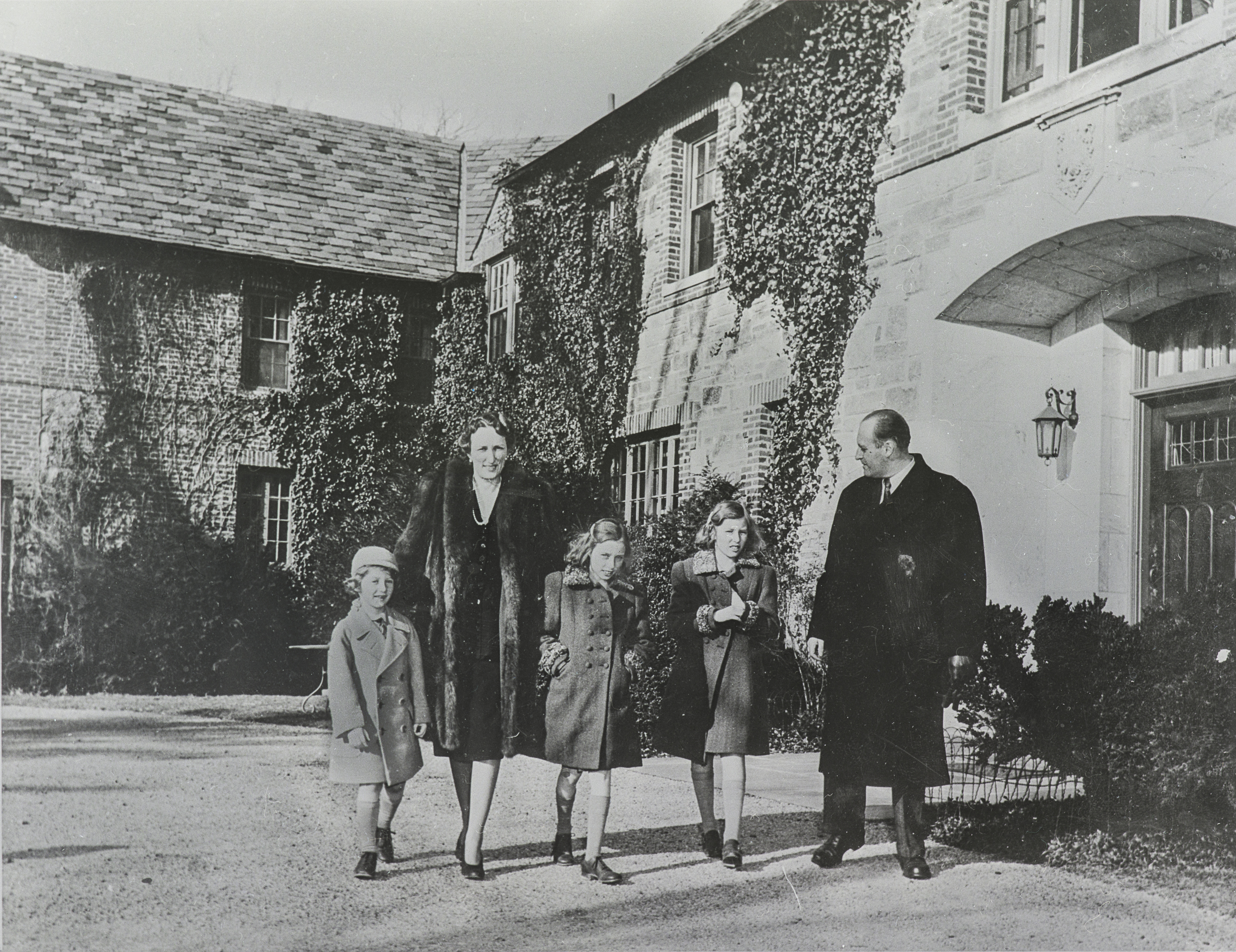
Crown Prince Olav and Crown Princess Märtha with their children Princess Astrid, Princess Ragnhild and Prince Harald at their exile home, Pook's Hill, in Bethesda, Maryland

== Reign ==
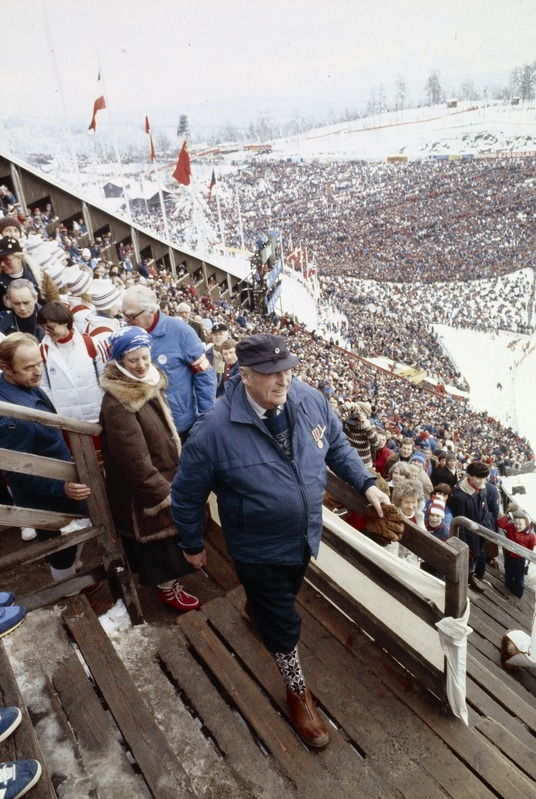
King Olav V at Holmenkollen in 1975

Haakon was injured in an accident in 1955; his son Olav served as regent until his death. Haakon died at the Royal Palace in Oslo on 21 September 1957. He was 85 years old. After his death, Olav succeeded him as Olav V.

Olav reigned as a "People's King," and became extremely popular, despite the fact that he had no queen consort (his wife, Märtha of Sweden, died in 1954). He liked to drive his own cars and would drive in the public lane even though, as king, he was allowed to drive in bus lanes. When driving was restricted during the 1973 energy crisis, King Olav wanted to lead by example even though he would have been well within his rights to drive. While going on a skiing trip, he dressed up in his skiing outfit and boarded the Holmenkollbanen suburban railway carrying his skis on his shoulder. When later asked how he dared to go out in public without bodyguards, he replied that "he had 4 million bodyguards", the population of Norway at the time.

For his athletic ability and role as King, Olav earned the Holmenkollen medal in 1968, the Medal for Outstanding Civic Achievement in 1970 and was made Name of the Year in 1975. He had a strong interest in military matters and took his role as titular Commander-in-Chief very seriously. As well as his ceremonial roles in the Norwegian Army, he also served as Colonel-in-Chief of the Green Howards (Alexandra, Princess of Wales's Yorkshire Regiment), the British regiment named for his grandmother Queen Alexandra.

The King represented Norway extensively abroad during his reign, conducting state visits to both neighbouring countries and more distant destinations such as Ethiopia and Iran. King Olav V opened the 14th World Scout Jamboree in July 1975 in the presence of 17,259 Scouts from 94 countries.

Although the constitution nominally vested Olav with executive power, he was not responsible for exercising it. In practice, his role was almost entirely ceremonial and representative. This not only followed practices dating from the definitive establishment of parliamentary rule in Norway in 1884, but also precedent set by his father. His acts were not valid without the countersignature of a minister–usually the Prime Minister–who then became politically responsible for the act in question. While he had the right to appoint the government, in practice it was impossible for him to appoint a government solely of his choosing or keep it in office against the will of the Storting. Nonetheless, like his father before him, he commanded great moral authority as a symbol of the nation's unity.

== Illness and death ==
During the summer of 1990, Olav suffered from health problems, but recovered somewhat during Christmas the same year. On 17 January 1991, he suffered a heart attack and died at his residence in the Royal Lodge Kongsseteren in Oslo. An interview given by his son Harald and hints in a biography by Jo Benkow, who was the President of the Storting at that time, mention the possibility that King Olav suffered great trauma upon learning of the outbreak of Operation Desert Storm, which began on the day he died. Harald succeeded him as king.

On the night of his death and for several days up until the state funeral, Norwegians mourned publicly, lighting hundreds of thousands of candles in the courtyard outside the Royal Palace in Oslo, with letters and cards placed amongst them. The National Archives have preserved all these cards.

=== Funeral ===
The state funeral of King Olav V was held on 30 January 1991. During the funeral procession from the Royal Palace to Oslo Cathedral, more than 100,000 people lined up along Karl Johans gate to pay their respects. Prime Minister Gro Harlem Brundtland gave the eulogy at the funeral, before the casket was moved to Akershus Fortress where a private service was held.

Olav was finally laid to rest next to his wife Märtha in the green sarcophagus of the Royal Mausoleum.

== Legacy ==
King Olav's leadership during the Second World War made him a symbol of Norwegian independence and national unity. As King Olav's wife, Princess Märtha, died of cancer, the King Olav V's Prize for Cancer Research was established in 1992.

A 2005 poll by the Norwegian Broadcasting Corporation named King Olav "Norwegian of the Century".

=== In popular culture ===
Viktor Andersen portrayed the two-year-old Prince Alexander (Olav) in the 2009 NRK drama series Harry & Charles. Actor Anders Baasmo Christiansen was chosen to portray Crown Prince Olav in the 2016 drama The King's Choice while Tobias Santelmann portrayed Olav in the 2021 NRK drama Atlantic Crossing. In the period drama The Commoner, which premiered in 2025 on Amazon Prime Video, Anders Baasmo Christiansen again portrayed Olav, this time during his reign as King of Norway.

== Honours ==
=== National honours and medals ===
- Norway:
  - Recipient of the War Cross
  - Recipient of the Medal for Outstanding Civic Achievement in gold
  - Grand Cross with Collar of the Royal Norwegian Order of St Olav (18 November 1905); Grand Master (21 September 1957)
  - Founder of the Royal Norwegian Order of Merit (1985)
  - Recipient of the St Olav's medal
  - Recipient of the Haakon VII Coronation Medal
  - Recipient of the War Medal
  - Recipient of the Haakon VII 70th Anniversary Medal
  - Recipient of the King Haakon VII 1905–1955 Jubilee Medal

=== Foreign honours ===
- Argentina: Grand Cross with Collar of the Order of the Liberator General San Martin
- Austria: Grand Star of the Decoration of Honour for Services to the Republic of Austria
- Belgium: Grand Cordon of the Order of Leopold
- Brazil: Grand Cross with Collar of the Order of the Rose
- Chile: Grand Cross with Collar of the Order of the Merit of Chile
- Denmark:
  - Knight of the Elephant (13 August 1921)
  - Cross of Honour of the Order of the Dannebrog (13 August 1921)
  - Grand Commander of the Order of the Dannebrog (11 September 1958)
  - Recipient of the King Christian X's Liberty Medal
  - Recipient of the Commemorative Medal for King Christian IX's 100th birthday
  - Recipient of the Commemorative Medal for King Frederik VIII's 100th birthday
- Ethiopia: Grand Cross of the Order of Solomon
- Finland: Grand Cross of the Order of the White Rose
- France:
  - Grand Cross of the Order of Legion of Honour
  - Recipient of the Croix de guerre
  - Recipient of the Médaille militaire
- Germany: Grand Cross Special Class of the Order of Merit of the Federal Republic of Germany
- Greece:
  - Grand Cross of the Order of the Redeemer
  - Grand Cross of the Order of St. George and St. Constantine
  - Recipient of the War Cross
  - Recipient of the Commemorative Badge of the Centenary of the Royal House of Greece
- Iceland:
  - Grand Cross with Collar of the Order of the Falcon (1961)
  - Grand Cross of the Order of the Falcon (1955)
- Iran:
  - Grand Cordon of the Order of Pahlavi
  - Commemorative Medal of the 2500th Anniversary of the founding of the Persian Empire (14 October 1971).
- Italy: Knight Grand Cross with Collar of the Order of Merit of the Italian Republic (1965)
- Japan: Collar of the Order of the Chrysanthemum
- Luxembourg: Knight of the Order of the Gold Lion of the House of Nassau
- Mexico: Grand Cross of the Order of the Aztec Eagle
- Netherlands:
  - Grand Cross of the Order of the Netherlands Lion
  - Grand Cross of the Order of the House of Orange
  - Recipient of the War Cross
  - Recipient of the Queen Juliana Inauguration Medal (1948)
- Peru: Grand Cross of the Order of the Sun
- Portugal:
  - Grand Cross of the Military Order of Aviz
  - Grand Collar of the Order of Saint James of the Sword
- Romania: Knight Grand Cross of the Order of the Star
- Saxony: Grand Cross of the Ernestine Order (Saxony, Germany)
- Spain:
  - Knight of the Order of the Golden Fleece
  - Collar of the Order of Charles III
- Sweden:
  - Knight of the Royal Order of the Seraphim (1 November 1926)
  - Recipient of the 70th Birthday Medal of King Gustaf V (1928)
  - Recipient of the 90th Birthday Medal of King Gustaf V (1948) King Gustaf V's 90th Anniversary Medal
- Thailand:
  - Knight of the Most Illustrious Order of the Royal House of Chakri (19 September 1960)
  - Knight Grand Cordon (Special Class) of the Most Illustrious Order of Chula Chom Klao
- Tunisia: Grand Cross of the Order of Independence
- Vatican City: Collar of the Order of Pope Pius IX (1967)
- United Kingdom:
  - Stranger Knight Companion of the Most Noble Order of the Garter (29 May 1959)
  - Extra Knight of the Most Ancient and Most Noble Order of the Thistle
  - Honorary Knight Grand Cross of the Most Honourable Order of the Bath
  - Recipient of the Royal Victorian Chain
  - Honorary Knight Grand Cross of the Royal Victorian Order
  - Recipient of the King George V Silver Jubilee Medal
  - Recipient of the King George VI Coronation Medal
  - Recipient of the Queen Elizabeth II Coronation Medal
- United States:
  - Chief Commander of the Legion of Merit
  - Recipient of Honorary Degree of Doctor of Laws, University of North Dakota
- Yugoslavia: Great Star of the Order of the Yugoslav Star

=== Other honours ===
- Norway – A 180 000 km^{2} area (Prince Olav Coast) and the Prince Olav Mountains in Antarctica are named in his honour.
- Norway – Olav V Land on Svalbard is named in his honour.
- Norway – In 1961 the King was a laureate of the Nansen Refugee Award.
- Norway – In 1968 he was awarded the Holmenkollen medal.
- Norway – In 2005, Olav was proclaimed the Norwegian of the Century, with 41 percent of the tele-votes in a popular competition held by NRK.
- United Kingdom – In 1959, Olav was granted the honorary rank of Air Chief Marshal in the Royal Air Force.
- United Kingdom – In 1958, Olav was granted the honorary rank of Admiral in the Royal Navy, and in 1988, he was granted the honorary rank of Admiral of the Fleet.
- United Kingdom – Honorary Freeman of Richmond
- United Kingdom – Honorary Freedom of Newcastle upon Tyne
- South Georgia and the South Sandwich Islands – Prince Olav Harbour on South Georgia is also named in his honour.
- Norway – Member of the Independent Order of Odd Fellows.
- Skopje, SR Macedonia – In 1966, Olav became an honorary citizen.

== Issue ==
Name	Birth	Death	Marriage	Children
Princess Ragnhild	9 June 1930	16 September 2012	Erling Lorentzen (m. 1953; died 2021)	Haakon Lorentzen (b. 1954); Ingeborg Lorentzen Ribeiro (b. 1957); Ragnhild Lorentzen Long (b. 1968)
Princess Astrid	12 February 1932	11 September 2026	Johan Ferner (m. 1961; died 2015)	Cathrine Ferner Johansen (b. 1962); Benedikte Ferner Stange (b. 1963); Alexander Ferner (b. 1965); Elisabeth Ferner Beckmann (b. 1969); Carl-Christian Ferner (b. 1972)
Harald V	21 February 1937	28 August 2026	Sonja Haraldsen (m. 1968)	Princess Märtha Louise (b. 1971); Haakon VIII (b. 1973)

== See also ==
- Descendants of Christian IX of Denmark – Lists members of European royalty who share a common ancestor with Olav V

== Bibliography ==
- Benkow, Jo (1991). Olav – menneske og monark (in Norwegian) (3rd ed.). Oslo: Gyldendal Norsk Forlag. ISBN 82-05-20192-7.
- Bramsen, Bo (1992). Huset Glücksborg. Europas svigerfader og hans efterslægt [The House of Glücksburg. The Father-in-law of Europe and his descendants] (in Danish) (2nd ed.). Copenhagen: Forlaget Forum. ISBN 87-553-1843-6.
- Bratli, Kjell Arne; Schau, Øyvind (1995). Sjøoffiser og samfunnsbygger : Vernepliktige sjøoffiserers forening : 100-års jubileumsbok : 1895–1995 (in Norwegian). Hundvåg: Sjømilitære Samfund ved Norsk Tidsskrift for Sjøvesen. ISBN 82-91008-09-4.
- Dahl, Hans Fredrik (1982). Norge under Olav V (in Norwegian). Oslo: Cappelen. ISBN 8202090520.
- Flint, Peter B. (18 January 1991). "Olav V, Norway's King 33 Years And Resistance Hero, Dies at 87". The New York Times.
- Lerche, Anna; Mandal, Marcus (2003). A royal family : the story of Christian IX and his European descendants. Copenhagen: Aschehoug. ISBN 9788715109577.
- Suits, Julia (2011). The Extraordinary Catalog of Peculiar Inventions: The Curious World of the Demoulin Brothers and Their Fraternal Lodge Prank Machi nes - from Human Centipedes and Revolving Goats to ElectricCarpets and SmokingC. Penguin Publishing Group. p. 53. ISBN 978-1-101-54576-8.

Olav V House of Schleswig-Holstein-Sonderburg-Glücksburg Cadet branch of the House of Oldenburg Born: 2 July 1903 Died: 17 January 1991
Regnal titles
Preceded by Haakon VII	King of Norway; 1957–1991	Succeeded by Harald V
Norwegian royalty
Preceded by Gustaf	Crown Prince of Norway; 1905–1957	Succeeded by Harald
Military offices
Preceded by Wilhelm von Tangen Hansteen	Chief of Defence of Norway; 1944–1945	Succeeded by Otto Ruge
