= It Ended Badly =

2015 book written by Jennifer Wright

It Ended Badly: 13 of the Worst Breakups in History
- First edition
- Author: Jennifer Wright
- Language: English
- Genre: Humor, non-fiction
- Published: November 3, 2015
- Publisher: Henry Holt and Company
- Publication place: United States
- Pages: 256
- Website: itendedbadly.net

It Ended Badly: 13 of the Worst Breakups in History is a 2015 book written by Jennifer Wright that documents thirteen well-known figures, caesars, queens, kings and philosophers and how their romantic relationships ended badly.
