= Wenche Lowzow =

Norwegian politician

Wenche Bryn Lowzow (27 May 1926 – 24 September 2016) was a Norwegian politician in the Conservative Party of Norway. She was a member of the Norwegian parliament as a representative from Oslo from 1977 to 1985. When same-sex civil unions were accepted by Norwegian law in 1993, Lowzow and her partner, author and activist Karen-Christine Friele, were among the first to formalize their relationship.

Lowzow died on 24 September 2016 at the age of 90.
