= 1911 World Allround Speed Skating Championships =

International speed skating competition

World Allround Speed Skating Championships
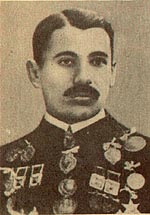
- Nikolay Strunnikov World champion 1911
- Venue: Øen Stadion, Trondheim, Norway
- Dates: 5–6 March
- Competitors: 12 from 4 nations

Medalist men
1st place, gold medalist(s)		Nikolay Strunnikov	RUS
2nd place, silver medalist(s)		Martin Sæterhaug	NOR
3rd place, bronze medalist(s)		Henning Olsen	NOR

The 1911 World Allround Speed Skating Championships took place at 5 and 5 March 1911 at the ice rink Øen Stadion in Trondheim, Norway.

Nikolay Strunnikov was defending champion and prolonged his title. He had the lowest number of points awarded, won all the four distances and became World champion.

== Allround results ==
Place	Athlete	Country	Points	500m	5000m	1500m	10000m
1st place, gold medalist(s)	Nikolay Strunnikov	Russia	4	46.4 (1)	9:10.2 (1)	2:26.0 (1)	18:13.0 (1)
2nd place, silver medalist(s)	Martin Sæterhaug	Norway	14	48.3 (4)	9:14.4 (4)	2:26.6 (2)	18:49.9 (4)
3rd place, bronze medalist(s)	Henning Olsen	Norway	15	48.6 (5)	9:13.4 (3)	2:29.7 (4)	18:39.9 (3)
4	Thomas Bohrer	Austria	17	47.0 (2)	9:15.6 (5)	2:30.5 (5)	18:50.0 (5)
5	Trygve Lundgreen	Norway	17	49.9 (9)	9:12.2 (2)	2:31.0 (6)	18:29.2 (2)
6	Otto Andersson	Sweden	19	48.2 (3)	9:18.5 (7)	2:26.9 (3)	19:11.7 (6)
7	Stener Johannessen	Norway	28	50.4 (12)	9:17.8 (6)	2:32.4 (7)	19:13.5 (7)
8	Johs Fladaas	Norway	32,5	49.6 (7)	9:54.4 (10)	2:36.0 (8)	19:42.2 (9)
9	Ejnar Sørensen	Denmark	33,5	50.7 (13)	9:44.0 (8)	2:36.0 (8)	19:26.4 (8)
10	Hendrik Taconis	Netherlands	40	52.0 (15)	9:55.6 (11)	2:41.8 (16)	19:55.1 (10)
NC	Ivar Fyhn	Norway	-	50.0 (10)	10:15.5 (14)	2:41.7 (15)	NS
NC	Christian Fyhn	Norway	-	50.0 (10)	10:01.7 (13)	2:40.5 (13)	NS
NC	Thoralf Thoresen	Norway	-	49.6 (7)	NF	2:41.3 (14)	NS
NC	Jacob Sæterhaug	Norway	-	51.4 (14)	9:48.3 (9)	2:40.4 (11)	NS
NC	Sigurd Jensen	Norway	-	52.9 (16)	9:58.9 (12)	2:40.4 (11)	NS
NC	Otto Monsen	Norway	-	49.5 (6)	10:18.5 (15)	2:37.3 (10)	NS

* = Fell
NC = Not classified
NF = Not finished
NS = Not started
DQ = Disqualified

Source: SpeedSkatingStats.com

== Rules ==
Four distances have to be skated:

- 500m
- 1500m
- 5000m
- 10000m

The ranking was made by award ranking points. The points were awarded to the skaters who had skated all the distances. The final ranking was then decided by ordering the skaters by lowest point totals.

- 1 point for 1st place
- 2 point for 2nd place
- 3 point for 3rd place
- and so on

One could win the World Championships also by winning at least three of the four distances, so the ranking could be affected by this.

Silver and bronze medals were awarded.
