= Kim Friele =

Norwegian writer and gay rights activist (1935–2021)

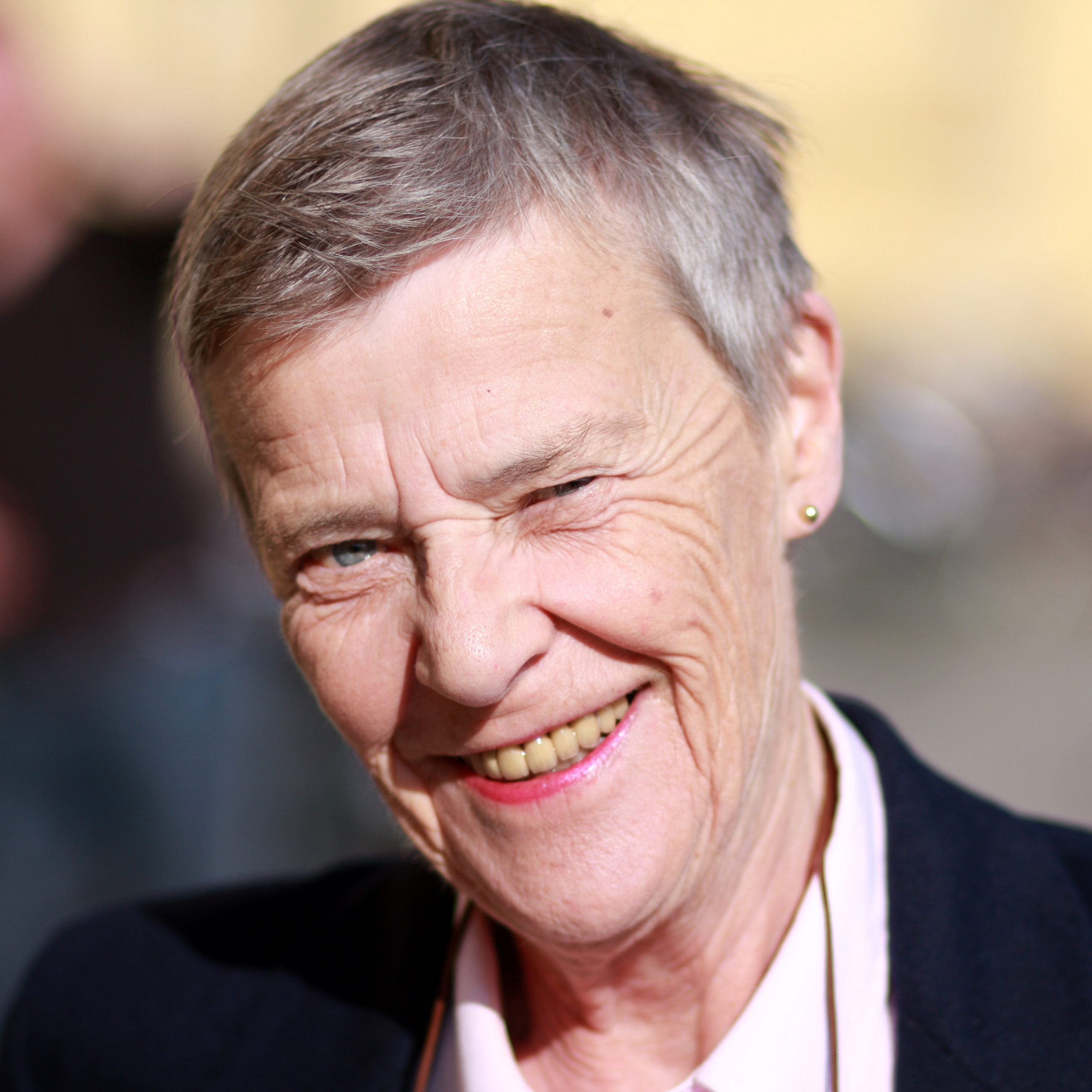
- Friele in May 2009
- Born: Karen-Christine Wilhemsen; 27 May 1935; Fana, Bergen, Norway
- Died: 22 November 2021 (aged 86)
- Other name: Karen-Christine Friele
- Education: University of Cambridge
- Occupations: Author, activist
- Organization: Norwegian Organisation for Sexual and Gender Diversity
- Political party: Labour Party
- Spouses: Wenche Lowzow (m. 1993; died 2016) Ole Friele (m. 1959; div. 1961)
- Awards: Fritt Ord Award (1978); Humanist Award (1999); Knight 1st Class (2000); Honorary state-subsidised funeral (2021)

Karen-Christine Friele (née Wilhelmsen; 27 May 1935 – 22 November 2021), known as Kim Friele, was a Norwegian gay rights and human rights activist, famous for being the first gay Norwegian to publicly acknowledge and advocate for her sexuality, in June 1965. She acted as the leader for the previously secret organization Forbundet av 1948 between 1966 and 1971, and as its secretary general until 1989.

== Early life ==
Friele was born Karen-Christine Wilhelmsen in Fana in Bergen, Norway. She attended the University of Cambridge and was employed from 1958 to 1971 at the information office for insurance. She was briefly married to a childhood friend, Ole Friele, Jr., from 1959 to 1961.

She came out as a lesbian, around three years before the repeal (in 1972) of Section 213 of the Norwegian Penal Code; she was one of two openly gay persons in Norway, that were then known to the public.

== Career ==
In Norway, Friele is credited with having influenced the decriminalisation of homosexual acts in 1972 and for declassifying homosexuality as a psychiatric condition in 1978. She and Wenche Lowzow, a noted politician in the Conservative Party, were among the first to formalize their partnership when same-sex unions were allowed in 1993. She wrote several books on gay and human rights, starting in 1972.

In 2000, she was appointed a Knight 1st Class of the Order of St. Olav. A bust of her was unveiled in front of the Oslo City Hall in 2005, and is now placed at the main branch of the Oslo Public Library.

In 2005, she was proclaimed the fourth most important Norwegian of the Century in a public vote through NRK.

Friele was appointed a statsstipendiat ("government scholar") in 1989, and lived in the ski town of Geilo, Norway.

== Death ==
She died in her home on 22 November 2021, aged 86. In a comment to the Norwegian public broadcasting company NRK, The Government Minister for culture and equality Anette Trettebergstuen praised Friele as one of the most important figures in the struggle for equality in Norway. Friele was honored with a state funeral on 6 December 2021. The prime minister spoke. Queen Sonja and crown princess Mette-Marit attended the funeral.

Awards
Preceded by Henrik Groth	Recipient of the Fritt Ord Award; 1978	Succeeded by Stein Mehren
