= Posten Bring =

Norwegian postal service

Posten Bring AS

- Type: State-owned (Aksjeselskap)
- Founded: January 17, 1647
- Founder: Henrik Morian
- Headquarters: Oslo, Norway
- Key people: Petter-Børre Furberg (CEO); Pål Wibe (Chairman)
- Products: Mail
- Revenue: NOK 24.972 billion (2024)
- Net income: 13,000,000 Norwegian krone (2019)
- Number of employees: 12,600
- Parent: Norwegian Ministry of Trade, Industry and Fisheries
- Subsidiaries: Bring
- Website: www.postenbring.no

Posten Bring, formerly Posten Norge (lit. 'The Mail, Norway'), is the name of the Norwegian postal service. The company, owned by the Norwegian Ministry of Transport and Communications, had a monopoly until 2016 on the distribution of letters weighing less than 50 grams (1.8 oz) throughout the country. There are 6 post offices in Norway, in addition to approximately 1400 sales outlets.

== History ==
Posten was founded in January 1647 as Postvesenet (lit. 'The Postal System') by general postmaster Henrik Morian. It was established as a private company, and King Christian IV gave his blessing to its founding. Postvesenet was privately run until 1719 when the state took over. From that point on, the national postal service was a state monopoly. Local city postal services remained private, but in 1888, a new postal law was introduced that expanded the monopoly to the entire country.

In 1933, Postvesenet was renamed Postverket. In 1996, Posten Norge BA was established as a state-owned company where the Norwegian state had limited liability. In 2002, Posten changed its corporate structure to that of a stock company to prepare the company for the expected deregulation of the Norwegian postal market. Posten Bring AS is still fully owned by the Norwegian state, and the liberalization process has been postponed until 2011 by the government.

The group is divided into five divisions: Post, E-commerce and Logistics, International Logistics, Nordic Network, and Next, each focused on specific customer and market needs.

== See also ==
- PostNord Sverige, the Swedish postal service
- When Harry Met Santa (TV advert for the company)
- List of oldest companies
