= Daniel Kibblesmith =

American writer and comedian

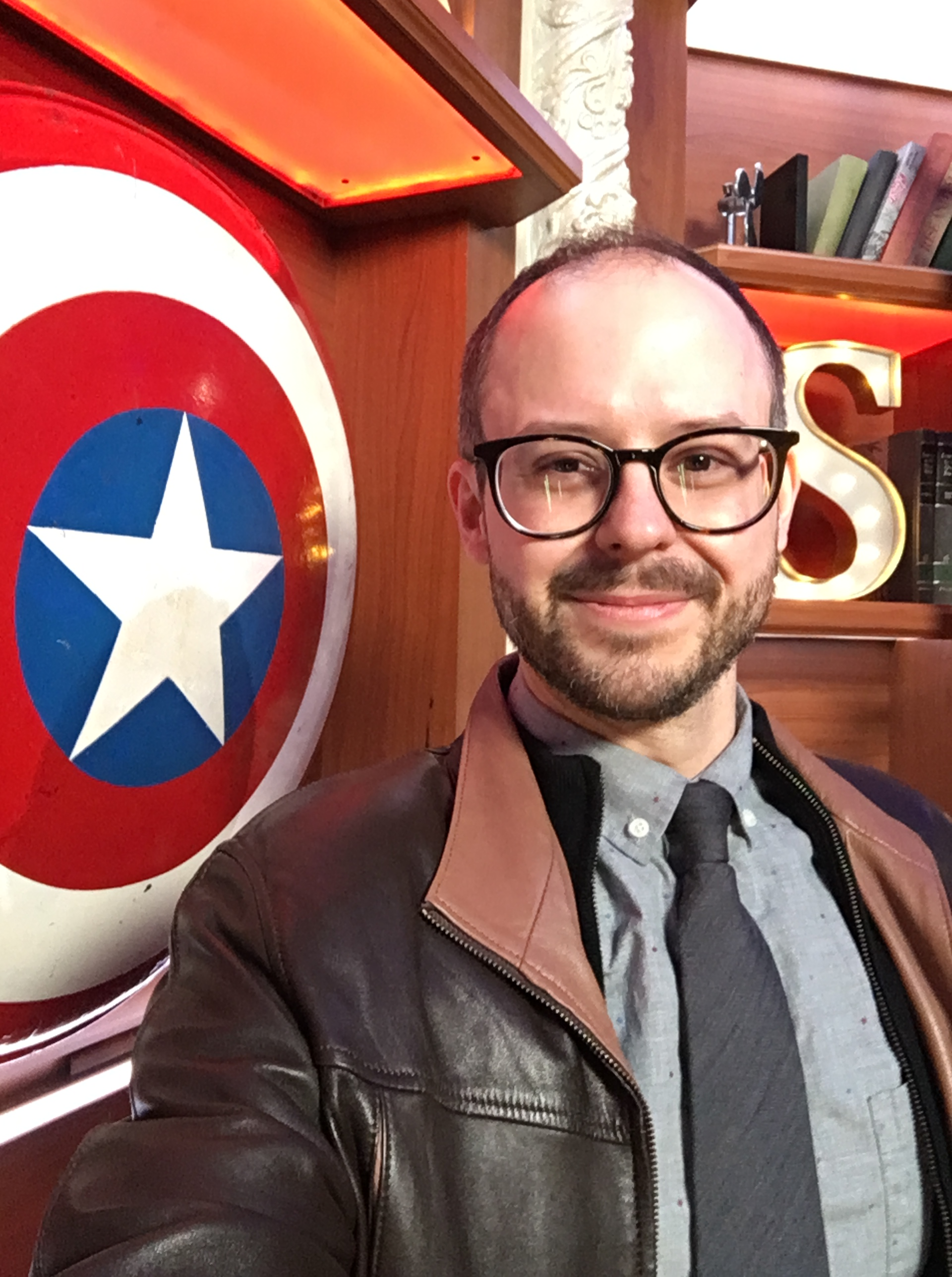
- Daniel Kibblesmith on the set of The Late Show With Stephen Colbert in 2019
- Born: Daniel Jordan Kibblesmith; October 9, 1983 (age 42)
- Notable work: Santa's Husband
- Spouse: Jennifer Wright (m. 2017)

Comedy career
- Genres: Comedy; Humor

Daniel Jordan Kibblesmith (born October 9, 1983) is an American writer and comedian who has written for television, comic books, and websites. As a writer for The Late Show with Stephen Colbert he is a five-time Emmy nominee.

== Early life ==
Kibblesmith is of Jewish ancestry through his mother. He attended Oak Park and River Forest High School.

== Internet writing ==
Kibblesmith was an early employee of Groupon, joining in 2009. When he left the company in 2014, he was then the in-house comedy writer and senior marketing copywriter. He was also in charge of developing the company's morale boosters. He left the company to become a freelancer. Kibblesmith became a founding editor of ClickHole in 2014, and afterward served as humor editor for BuzzFeed in 2015.

== Television writing ==
In 2015, Kibblesmith became a staff writer for The Late Show with Stephen Colbert. At the Late Show, he has received several Emmy nominations for Outstanding Writing for a Variety Series, four for the original series, and one for the special Stephen Colbert's Live Election Night Democracy's Series Finale: Who's Going To Clean Up This Sh*t?. He has also been nominated for Writers Guild Awards for Comedy/Variety Talk Series. Kibblesmith was also the writer for the Celebrating Marvel's Stan Lee television special in 2019.

== Books ==
Kibblesmith is the author of the books Princess Dinosaur (2021), We Wish You a Harley Christmas: DC Holiday Carols, and Santa's Husband (2017). Santa's Husband was inspired by a humorous tweet by Kibblesmith, who had heard of someone employed as Santa Claus at the Mall of America, who happened to be black. He wrote that he would tell future children that Santa Claus was black, and that any white Santa Claus was "Santa’s husband". Following the tweet, illustrator A.P. Quach created an image of a black and white Santa in romantic positioning. He is also the co-author of the book How to Win at Everything (2013).

== Comic books ==
In 2017 Kibblesmith was the writer for the satirical Valiant Comics book Quantum and Woody, Valiant High, and the Harley Quinn 25th Anniversary Special. He is also the writer for several Marvel comics, including variants of Spider-Man, Loki, Black Panther Vs. Deadpool, and Lockjaw. In 2019 he discussed his Loki series, that it described Loki as the Marvel Universe's "bad roommate". In March 2020, he was announced as writer for the relaunch of the New Warriors comic, for which he co-created Marvel's first non-binary character. The direction of the new characters – particularly the use of pejorative internet slang in names as well as the perceived political agenda of the writing – was met with considerable backlash from online audiences and was never published. In October 2021, Kibblesmith wrote the one-shot The Darkhold: Blade, following Blade after an alternate ending to the 1998 Blade film.

== Social media ==
Kibblesmith developed the idea for GOP Teens in 2012 with a dormant website, which he first began using as a parody space in 2014. In addition to the tweets, Kibblesmith also developed a line of parody merchandise sporting the GOP Teens logo. During the 2016 US Presidential Republican Primary, the parody Twitter account "GOP Teens" was described by Bustle as "a Republican youth outreach campaign that hilariously skewers politicians' misguided attempts to appeal to young people" by tweeting "messages written from the perspective of someone who doesn’t really understand how social media works". Kibblesmith's personal Twitter account has also been covered by the news as he releases comic tweets and items such as fan theories. He has also used his social media to issue parody comics focused on comic strips such as Calvin and Hobbes.

== Personal life ==
Originally from Oak Park, Illinois, he lives in New York City with his wife, Jennifer Wright, whom he married in 2017. Prior to meeting his wife, he was listed as one of Elle.com's Most Eligible Bachelors.
