= Nikita Naidenov =

Russian speed skater (1892–1961)

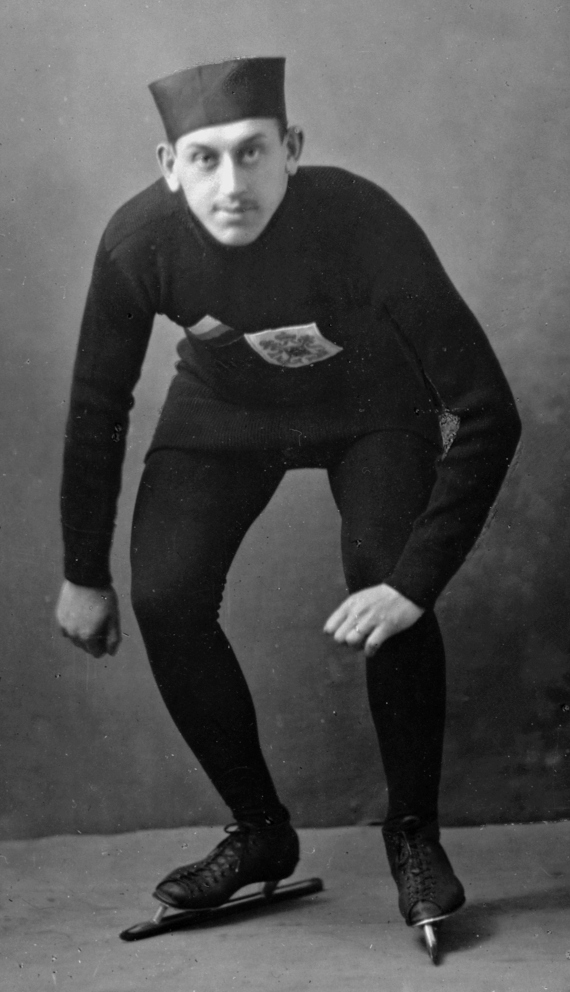
- Naidenov at the 1913 World Championships

Personal information
- Born: 6 April 1892
- Died: 19 September 1961 (aged 69) Moscow, Russia

Sport
- Sport: Speed skating
Medal record
Representing Russia
World Championships
Bronze medal – third place	1913 Helsinki	Allround

Nikita Ivanovich Naidenov (Russian: Никита Иванович Найдёнов, 6 April 1892 – 19 September 1961) was a Russian speed skater. In 1913 he won the national allround title and bronze medals at the European and world allround speed skating championships. Naidenov was also an accomplished pilot and fought in World War I. In June 1925, together with a group of several other Russian pilots, he flew 6476 km on Junkers F.13 from Moscow to Beijing.
