= Jennifer Wright =

American popular historian

- Born: April 27, 1986 (age 40)
- Education: St. John's College
- Occupations: Writer and journalist
- Spouse: Daniel Kibblesmith (m. 2017)
- Website: jenashleywright.com

Jennifer Wright is an American author and journalist. Wright has written seven books and is the political editor-at-large of Harper's Bazaar. She was one of the founders of the now defunct website TheGloss.com.

== Early life ==
Wright graduated from St. John's College in Annapolis, Maryland, United States.

== Career ==
Wright is a contributor to a number of publications including The New York Times, The Washington Post, The New York Post, the Observer and Salon. She is political editor-at-large at Harper's Bazaar. In 2010, Wright served as deputy editor for TheGloss.com, a fashion and beauty website.

Wright's book Madame Restell, a biography of the mid-19th century abortion provider, made The New York Times note: "In a heartfelt epilogue, Wright observes that Americans don’t take well to learning history. When it is delivered with this kind of blunt force, however, perhaps they might. Whatever readers end up thinking of Madame Restell, they surely cannot miss the core lesson: that there has never been a culture in human history without abortion. The only variable has ever been the cost." In a review of She Kills Me, the New York Journal of Books praised Wright on her research and ability to make the information comprehensible. In 2024, Netflix optioned the novel for a film adaptation.

Audible named Get Well Soon as the best history book of 2017.

== Personal life ==
Wright is married to Daniel Kibblesmith, a staff writer for The Late Show With Stephen Colbert. They were married on August 26, 2017, in New York City.

== Published books ==
- It Ended Badly: Thirteen of the Worst Breakups in History (2015)
- Get Well Soon: History's Worst Plagues and the Heroes Who Fought Them (2017)
- Killer Fashion: Poisonous Petticoats, Strangulating Scarves, and Other Deadly Garments Throughout History (2017)
- We Came First: Relationship Advice from Women Who Have Been There (2019)
- She Kills Me: The True Stories of History's Deadliest Women (2021)
- Madame Restell: The Life, Death, and Resurrection of Old New York's Most Fabulous, Fearless, and Infamous Abortionist (2023)
- Glitz, Glam, and a Damn Good Time: How Mamie Fish, Queen of the Gilded Age, Partied Her Way to Power (2025)
