= Get Well Soon (book) =

2017 book by Jennifer Wright

Get Well Soon: History's Worst Plagues and the Heroes Who Fought Them
- First edition
- Author: Jennifer Wright
- Language: English
- Genre: Nonfiction
- Published: 2017 (Henry Holt and Company)
- Publication place: United States
- ISBN: 978-1627797467

Get Well Soon: History's Worst Plagues and the Heroes Who Fought Them is a nonfiction book by Jennifer Wright, first published in 2017 by Henry Holt and Company. The book’s reception was generally positive, with reviews from publications including Publishers Weekly, Kirkus Reviews, and Library Journal.
