= Oscar Mathisen =

Norwegian speed skater (1888-1954)

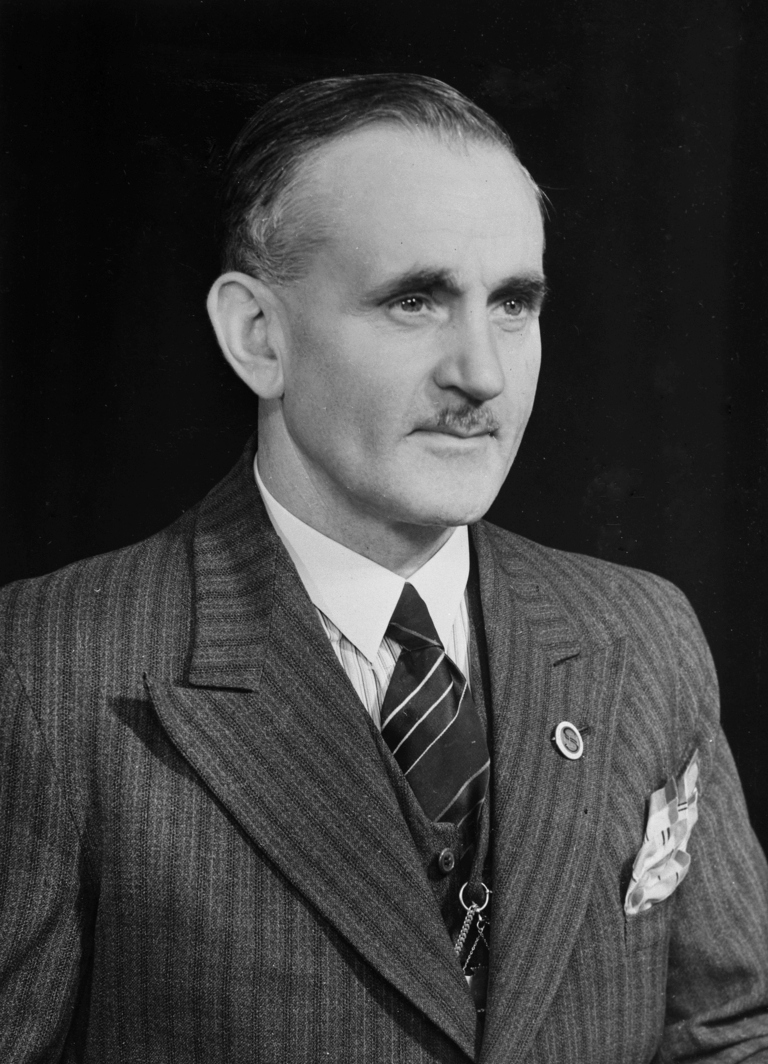
- Mathisen in 1938

Personal information
- Born: Oscar Wilhelm Mathisen; 4 October 1888 Kristiania, Norway
- Died: 10 April 1954 (aged 65) Norway

Sport
- Country: Norway
- Sport: Speed skating
- Retired: 1916
Medal record
Representing Norway
World Championships
Gold medal – first place	1908 Davos	Allround
Gold medal – first place	1909 Kristiania	Allround
Gold medal – first place	1912 Kristiania	Allround
Gold medal – first place	1913 Helsinki	Allround
Gold medal – first place	1914 Kristiania	Allround
Silver medal – second place	1910 Helsinki	Allround
European Championships
Gold medal – first place	1909 Budapest	Allround
Gold medal – first place	1912 Hamar	Allround
Gold medal – first place	1914 Berlin	Allround
Silver medal – second place	1908 Klagenfurt	Allround
Silver medal – second place	1913 Saint Petersburg	Allround
Bronze medal – third place	1910 Viipuri	Allround

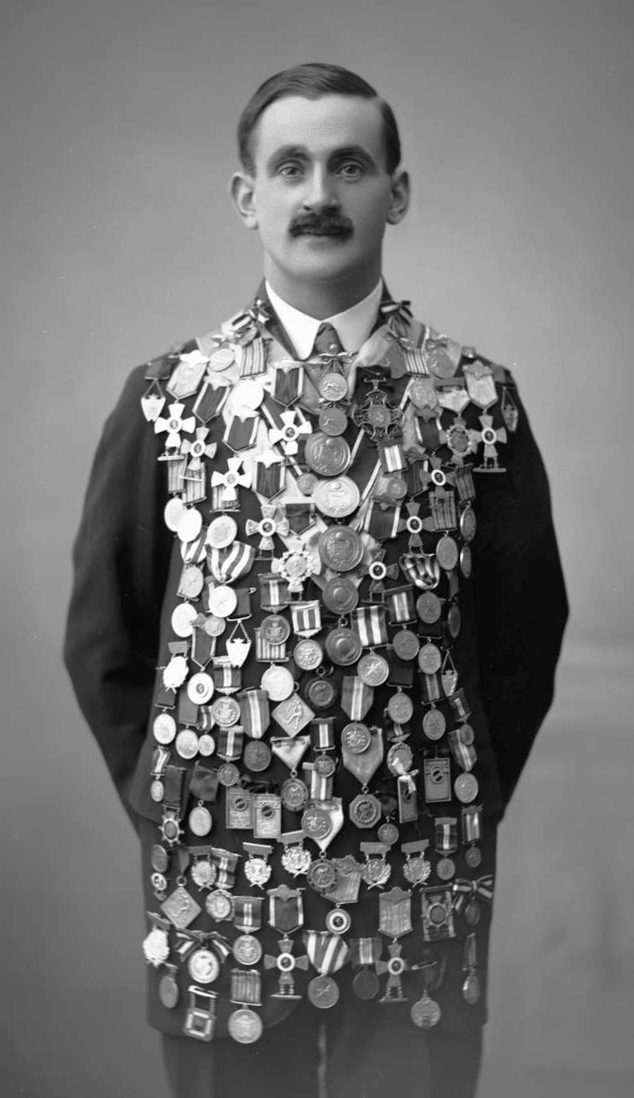
Mathisen in 1914

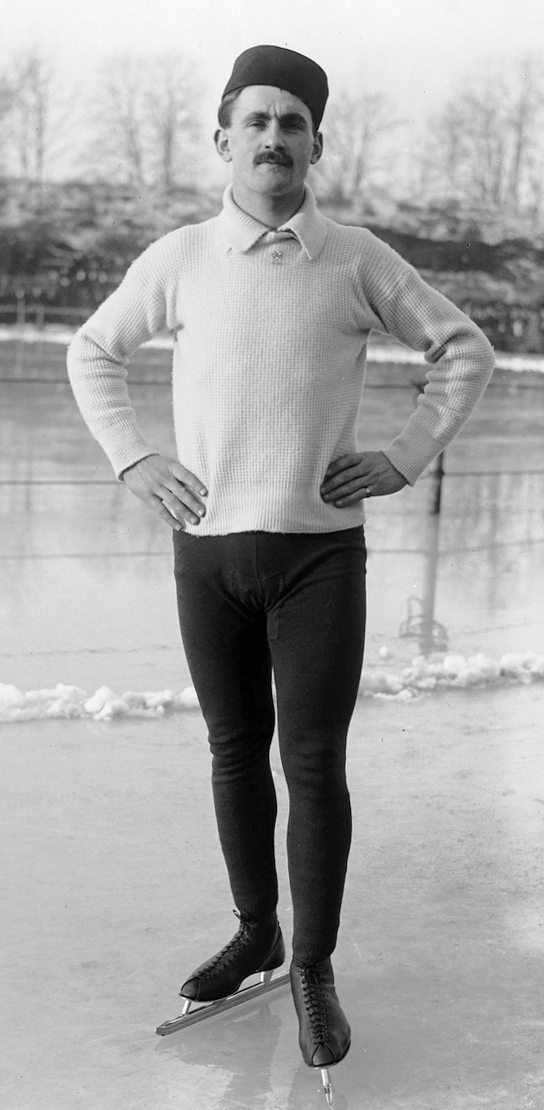
Mathisen in 1909

Oscar Wilhelm Mathisen (4 October 1888 – 10 April 1954) was a Norwegian speed skater and celebrity, almost rivalling Roald Amundsen and Fridtjof Nansen as symbols for a young nation (Norway became independent in 1905). He represented Kristiania Skøiteklub (now Oslo Skøiteklub).

== Early life ==
Oscar Mathisen was born in Kristiania (now Oslo) as the youngest of seven children. His parents, Carl Anton Mathisen (born in Østre Toten Municipality in 1852) and Pauline Mathisen (born in Vang Municipality in 1853), had five sons and two daughters: Carl Markus (1875), Petter Jørgen (1877), Johan Ingval (1879), Agnis Pauline (1880), Sigurd Valdemar (1883), Margit Antoni (1885), and Oscar Wilhelm (1888), all born in Kristiania. Mathisens parents made sure all their children knew how to skate. This paid off, as both Mathisen and his brother Sigurd became professional skaters.

== Career ==
Mathisen was crowned National Champion in 1907 at the age of 18, and became World Champion the following year (four years after his brother Sigurd Mathisen), despite falling on the 500 m. During his career, he set 14 world records, with his 1,500 m record from 1914 standing unrivalled for 23 years. The day before he set that 1,500 m record, he had broken Jaap Eden's world record on the 5,000 m and thereby had become the world record holder on all distances. He became World Allround Champion five times, a record that stood until 2013 when it was broken by Sven Kramer, and European Allround Champion three times.

After World War I, he became a professional skater and he was Professional World Champion in 1920. He continued his skating career until 1929. In that last year of his career, then 40 years old, he went to Davos, where people were preparing for the European Championships, and proved that he could still skate fast by beating the world record times on both the 500 m and the 1,000 m, although his times were not recognised as world records because he was a professional skater.

Mathisen was known for showing respect towards competitors who defeated him, including Nikolay Strunnikov, and later expressed appreciation for leading skaters such as Oleg Goncharenko.

== Death and legacy ==
On April 10th, 1954, Mathisen murdered his wife before committing suicide.

In 1959, a statue of Mathisen was erected outside of Frogner stadion in Oslo, where he celebrated many of his triumphs. Every year since 1959, the Oscar Mathisen Memorial Trophy is awarded to the most outstanding speed skating performance of the season.

== Medals ==
An overview of medals won by Mathisen at important championships he participated in, listing the years in which he won each:

Championships	Gold medal	Silver medal	Bronze medal
World Allround	1908; 1909; 1912; 1913; 1914	1910	–
European Allround	1909; 1912; 1914	1908; 1913	1910
Norwegian Allround	1907; 1909; 1910; 1912; 1913; 1915	1908	–

Sources: SpeedSkatingStats.com & Skoyteforbundet.no

== Records ==
=== World records ===
Over the course of his career, Mathisen skated 14 world records:

Distance	Time	Date	Location
1,500 m	2:20.8	8 February 1908	Davos – Eisstadion
1,000 m	1:31.8	30 January 1909	Davos – Eisstadion
1,500 m	2:20.6	3 January 1910	Davos – Eisstadion
500 m	44.2	17 February 1912	Kristiania – Gamle Frogner stadion
10,000 m	17:46.3	18 February 1912	Kristiania – Gamle Frogner stadion
10,000 m	17:36.4	25 January 1913	Trondheim – Øen Stadion
10,000 m	17:22.6	1 February 1913	Kristiania – Gamle Frogner stadion
500 m	44.0	16 March 1913	Hamar – Mjøsa
500 m	43.7	10 January 1914	Kristiania – Frogner stadion
1,500 m	2:19.4	11 January 1914	Kristiania – Frogner stadion
500 m	43.4	17 January 1914	Davos – Eisstadion
5,000 m	8:36.6	17 January 1914	Davos – Eisstadion
1,500 m	2:17.4	18 January 1914	Davos – Eisstadion
5,000 m	8:36.3	23 January 1916	Kristiania – Frogner stadion

Source: SpeedSkatingStats.com

=== Personal records ===
To put these personal records in perspective, the Notes column lists the official world records on the dates that Mathisen skated his personal records.

Personal records
Men's speed skating
Event	Result	Date	Location	Notes
500 m	43.0	14 January 1929	Davos – Eisstadion	43.1
1,000 m	1:31.1	10 January 1929	Davos – Eisstadion	1:31.8
1,500 m	2:17.4	18 January 1914	Davos – Eisstadion	2:19.4
3,000 m	5:25.0	5 March 1924	Stabekk idrettsplass	none
5,000 m	8:36.3	23 January 1916	Kristiania – Gamle Frogner stadion	8:36.6
10,000 m	17:22.6	1 February 1913	Kristiania – Gamle Frogner stadion	17:36.4

Source: EvertStenlund.se

Note that Mathisen's personal records on the 500 m and the 1,000 m were not recognised as world records by the International Skating Union (ISU) because Mathisen was a professional skater when he set those.

Apart from on the 3,000 m, every one of these personal records was faster than the official world record on the given distance at the time, while in most cases, Mathisen himself already was the world record holder. As for the 3,000 m, this was not an official world record event, as governed by the ISU, until 1932. Both the first official world record on this distance (by Clas Thunberg in 1932) and the second one (by Michael Staksrud in 1933) were actually slower than Mathisen's personal record. When Ivar Ballangrud set the third official world record on the 3,000 m in 1935, the 3,000 m world record finally was faster than Mathisen's personal record.

Mathisen has an Adelskalender score of 192.560 points. He held first place on the Adelskalender for 7,649 days between 1909 and 1930, more than twice as long as anyone else. The number two on the list of people who led the Adelskalender for the highest number of days is Ivar Ballangrud (who actually replaced Mathisen at the top of the Adelskalender) with 3,675 days.
