= Martin Sæterhaug =

Norwegian speed skater and cyclist

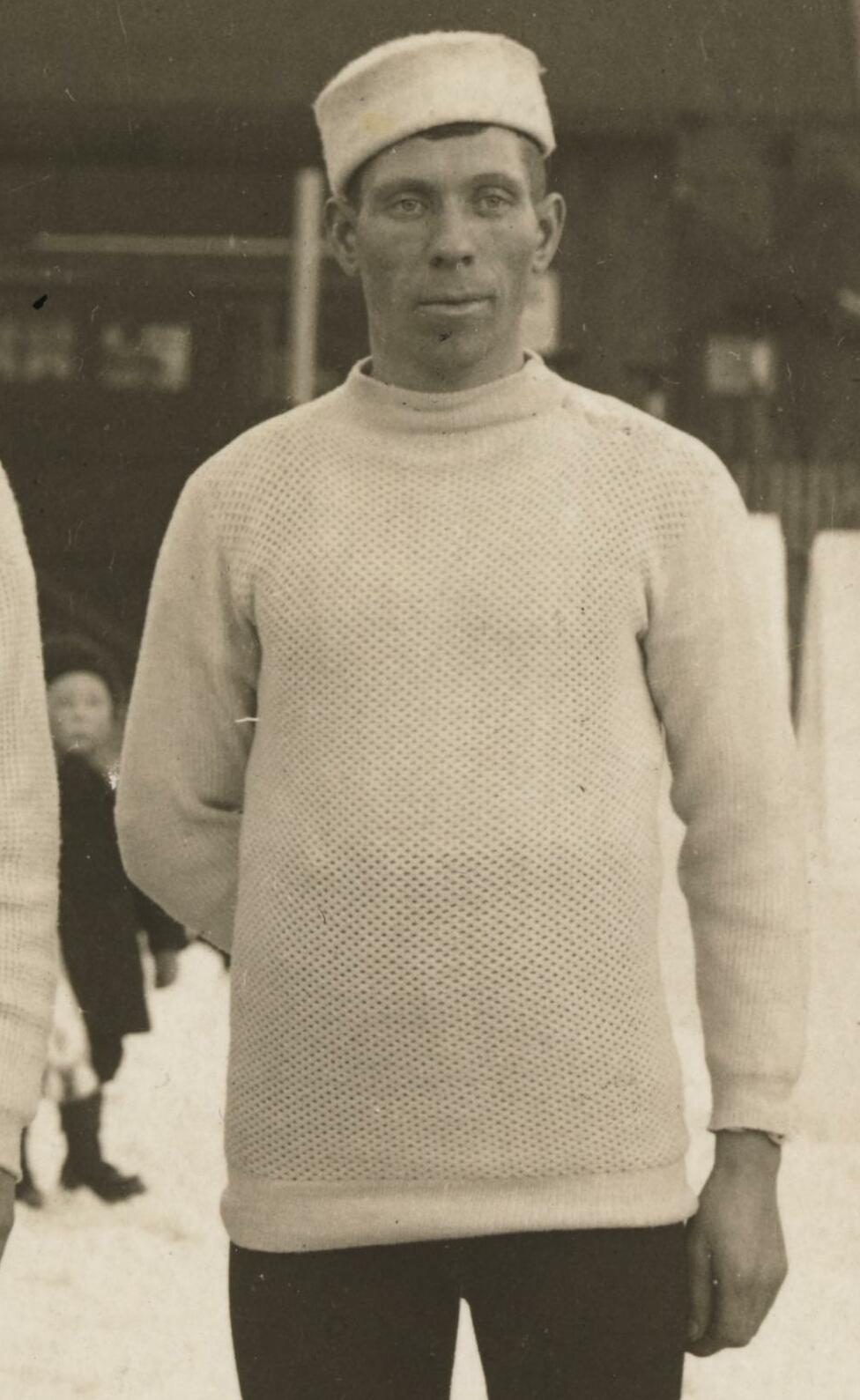
- in Davos 1908

Personal information
- Born: 13 August 1882 Rindal, Norway
- Died: 23 August 1961 (aged 79) Trondheim, Norway

Sport
- Sport: Speed skating
Medal record
Representing Norway
World Championships
Silver medal – second place	1908 Kristiania	Allround
Silver medal – second place	1911 Trondhjem	Allround
Bronze medal – third place	1910 Helsingfors	Allround
European Championships
Bronze medal – third place	1912 Stockholm	Allround

Martin Sæterhaug (13 August 1882 – 23 August 1961) was a Norwegian speed skater and cyclist. He won silver medals at the 1908 and 1911 World Allround Speed Skating Championships and a bronze medal in 1910. In cycling, he competed in two events at the 1912 Summer Olympics.
