= Sigurd Mathisen =

Norwegian speed skater (1883-1919)

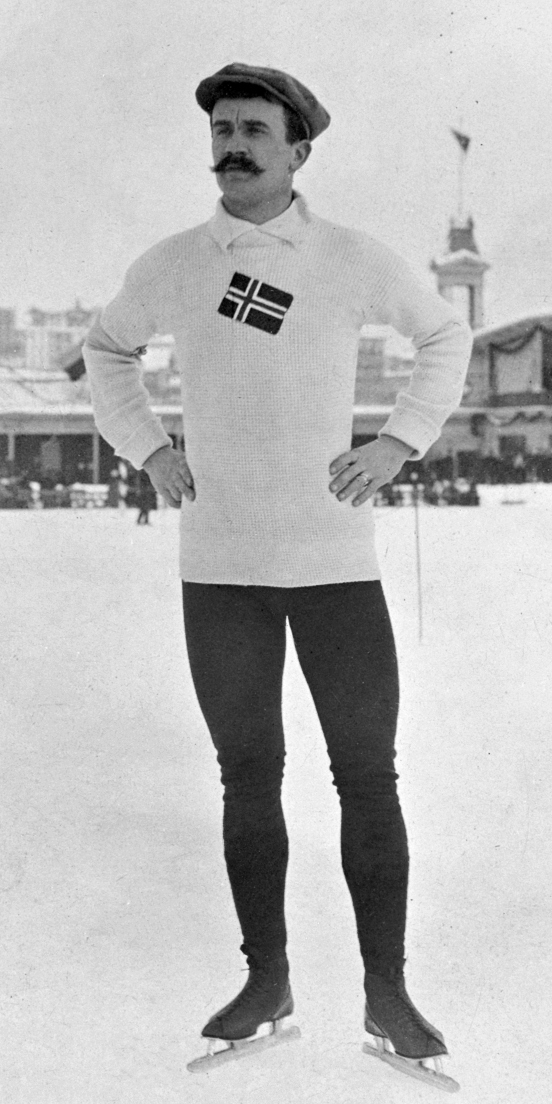

Personal information
- Born: Sigurd Valdemar Mathisen; 26 April 1883 Kristiania, Norway
- Died: 4 March 1919 (aged 34) Norway
- Relatives: Oscar Mathisen (brother)

Sport
- Country: Norway
- Sport: Speed skating
Medal record
Representing Norway
World Championships
Gold medal – first place	1904 Kristiania	Allround

Sigurd Valdemar Mathisen (26 April 1883 – 4 March 1919) was a Norwegian speed skater, world champion and world record holder over 500 m. He was an older brother of Oscar Mathisen.

== Early life ==
Sigurd Valdemar Mathisen was born on April 26, 1883. His parents taught all their children how to skate. It paid off, as both Mathisen and his brother Oscar became professional speed skaters.

== Career ==
Mathisen won a gold medal at the 1904 World Allround Championships, where he won the 1500 m (shared), 5000 m and 10,000 m races. All distances were originally won by Peter Sinnerud, but he was later disqualified for professionalism, and Mathisen was declared world champion.

== Death ==
In early 1919, Mathisen caught the Spanish flu as it spread across the world. He died of the disease on 4 March of that year.

== Records ==
=== World record ===
In 1908, Mathisen improved the world record on 500 m to 44.4 seconds (sharing the record with Johan Vikander). The record was beaten in 1912 by Oscar Mathisen.

Discipline	Time	Date	Location
500 m	0.44,4	9 February 1908	Davos

Source: SpeedSkatingStats.com

=== Personal records ===
Personal records
Men's speed skating
Event	Result	Date	Location	Notes
500m	44.4	9 February 1908	Davos	
1500m	2:26.2	9 February 1908	Davos	
5000m	9:05.2	1 February 1909	Davos	
10000m	18:35.2	15 February 1902	Kristiania	
