= Section 213 of the Norwegian Penal Code =

Sodomy law repealed in 1972

Section 213 was a provision of the Norwegian Penal Code of 1902 (Norwegian: Almindelig borgerlig Straffelov) that defined sexual intercourse between men as well as between people and animals as a crime. The section was repealed on April 21, 1972. It was, among other things, the sodomy law of Norway.

The provision read:

If indecent intercourse occurs between male persons, those, who have committed or have been accessory to such intercourse, are liable to a term of imprisonment up to 1 year.

Any person, who conducts indecent intercourse with animals, or is accessory to such intercourse, is liable to the same sentence as defined above.

Indictment will only be conducted when necessary by public consideration.

From 1989 to 2000, section 213 defined sexual intercourse.

Zoophilia is prohibited by the 2009 Act on Protection of Animals (dyrevelferdsloven).

== Formal apologies ==
On April 20, 2022, the government of Norway made formal apologies to all victims of the ban on gay sex between men, which was repealed 50 years prior in 1972.

== See also ==
- LGBT rights in Norway
