= Nikolay Strunnikov =

Russian speed skater and cyclist

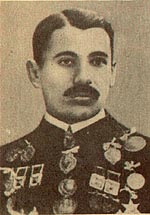
Nikolay Strunnikov

Nikolay Vasilyevich Strunnikov (Russian: Николай Васильевич Струнников) (16 December 1886 – 12 January 1940) was a Russian World Champion in speed skating. In addition, he was also successful as a cyclist. Nikolay Strunnikov was born in Sknyatino and quickly became a very enthusiastic and highly disciplined athlete, training daily. During the summer, he trained on bicycles, and during the winter, he trained in speed skating and played bandy. After returning from work, he would always be on the ice at the same time every day to skate his rounds, regardless of weather conditions. Even at times, the temperature was −40 °C (equal to −40 °F), he would still go through his entire training program. His enthusiasm and dedication paid off and in 1906, he won silver at the Russian National Allround Championships.

He quickly improved even further and became the Russian Allround Champion in 1908, 1909, and 1910. In 1909, he also won the National Championships in cycling. Still relatively unknown to the rest of the world, Strunnikov made his international debut at the European Allround Championships in 1910 and promptly won gold. Two weeks later, he participated in the 1910 World Allround Championships of Helsinki. After three distances, the reigning World Champion and holder of multiple world records, Norwegian skating legend Oscar Mathisen, had a relatively comfortable lead, but Strunnikov finished well ahead of the entire field on the final distance and became World Champion in the process; something which commanded tremendous respect from Mathisen.

In 1911, Strunnikov traveled to Norway in preparation for the European Championships there. During his preparations, he set a new world record on the 5,000 m, beating Jaap Eden's world record that had stood for 17 years. (His world record would not be recognized by the International Skating Union until 1967, though.) Three weeks later, he became European Champion for the second time, and he did so by winning all four distances during those championships. One week after that, he became World Champion for the second time, while once more winning all four distances. In fact, at every international tournament in which Strunnikov participated in 1911, he was the winner on every distance he skated – a total of twelve distance wins that year.

Much was expected from Strunnikov in 1912, but a disagreement with the sports association to which he belonged resulted in his retirement from speed skating. He remained active in sports, though, cycling for many years afterward. In the 1920s he also became a coach and he would remain a coach until he died in 1940 in Moscow.

== Medals ==
An overview of medals won by Strunnikov at important championships he participated in, listing the years in which he won each:

Championships	Gold medal	Silver medal	Bronze medal
World Allround	1910; 1911	–	–
European Allround	1910; 1911	–	–
Russian Allround	1908; 1909; 1910	1906; 1907	–

== World records ==
Over the course of his career, Strunnikov skated one world record:

Discipline	Time	Date	Location
5000 m	8.37,2	February 4, 1911	(Norway) Kristiania

Source: SpeedSkatingStats.com

== Personal records ==
To put these personal records in perspective, the WR column lists the official world records on the dates that Strunnikov skated his records.

Event	Result	Date	Venue	WR
500 m	45.1	11 February 1911	Kristiania	44.4
1,000 m	1:38.0	7 January 1911	Moscow	1:31.8
1,500 m	2:23.8	12 February 1911	Kristiania	2:20.6
5,000 m	8:37.2	4 February 1911	Kristiania	8:37.6
10,000 m	17:59.8	18 February 1911	Hamar	17:50.6

Strunnikov has an Adelskalender score of 198.743 points. His highest ranking on the Adelskalender was second place.

== External records ==
- Nikolay Strunnikov at SpeedSkatingStats.com
- Nikolay Strunnikov. Deutsche Eisschnelllauf Gemeinschaft e.V. (German Skating Association).
- Evert Stenlund's Adelskalender pages
- Short biography of Nikolay Strunnikov (in Russian)
- Results of Championships of Russia and the USSR from SpeedSkating.ru
- Historical World Records. International Skating Union.
