= Islam in Norway =

Muslims in Norway
Total population
- 182,607 (3.4% of the population)

Regions with significant populations
- Oslo and Viken

Islam in Europe by percentage of country population 95–100%: Azerbaijan; 90–95%: Turkey; Kosovo; 50–70%: Albania; Bosnia and Herzegovina; Kazakhstan; 30–35%: North Macedonia; 10–20%: France; Georgia; Montenegro; 5–10%: Austria; Belgium; Bulgaria; Denmark; Germany; Liechtenstein; Luxembourg; Netherlands; Russia; Sweden; Switzerland; United Kingdom; Spain; Greece; 4–5%: Serbia; 2–4%: Italy; Finland; Norway; Malta; Slovenia; Cyprus (Note: Only takes into account the Muslim population residing on land controlled by the Republic of Cyprus.); 1–2%: Croatia; Ireland; Ukraine; Andorra; < 1%: Iceland; Armenia; Belarus; Czech Republic; Estonia; Hungary; Latvia; Lithuania; Moldova; Monaco; Poland; Portugal; Romania; San Marino; Slovakia

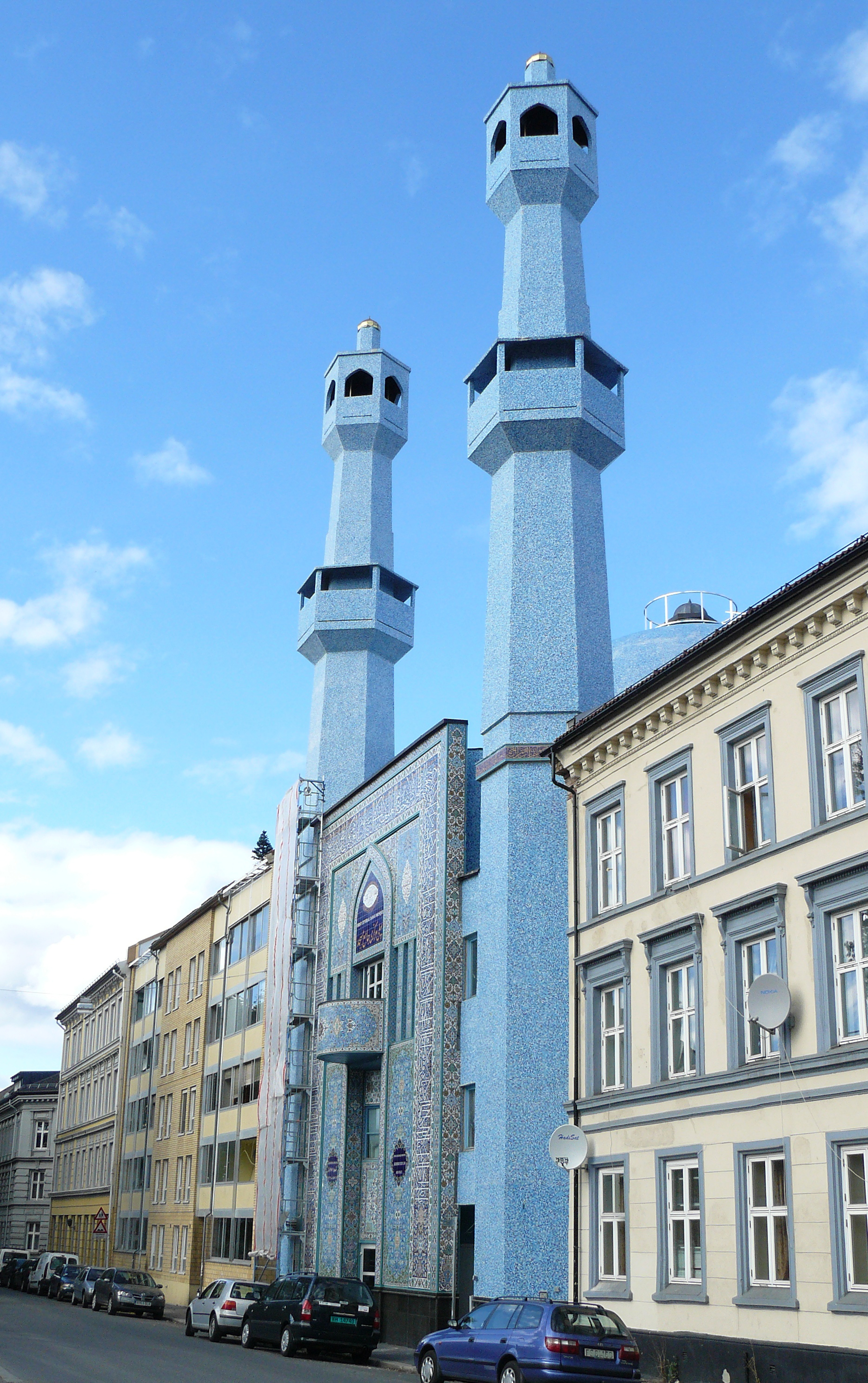
World Islamic Mission mosque in Oslo.

Islam is the second largest religion in Norway after Christianity. As of 2020, the number of Muslims living in Norway was 182,607 (3.4% of the total population). The majority of Muslims in Norway are Sunni, with a significant Shia minority. 55 percent of Muslims in the country live in Oslo, Akershus, Buskerud and Østfold. The vast majority of Muslims have an immigrant background, and very few ethnic Norwegians are Muslim.

== History ==
Icelandic annals date the arrival of representatives from the Muslim sultan of Tunis in Norway in the 1260s, after King Håkon Håkonsson had sent embassies to the Sultan with rich gifts. However, the number of Muslims in the country was not significant until the latter half of the 20th century. By 1958, Ahmadiyya missionaries had attracted a small number of converts and established a small community in Oslo. Immigration from Muslim countries to Norway began late compared to other western European countries and did not gather pace until the late 1960s. However, due to the oil boom, labor migration lasted longer than in other countries. The first Pakistani immigrant laborers arrived in 1967. In 1975, labor immigration to Norway was halted, but rules for family reunification were relatively relaxed for several more years. As a result, while most immigrants until the 1970s were laborers, immigration in the 1980s and 1990s was dominated by those seeking asylum.

The number of Muslims in Norway was first registered in official statistics in 1980 when it was given as 1006. These statistics were based on membership of a registered congregation. The actual number is likely to be higher given that few Muslims were then members of a mosque. Historian of religion Kari Vogt estimates that 10% of Norwegian Muslims were members of a mosque in 1980, a proportion which had increased to 70% by 1998. Being a member of a mosque was an alien concept to many immigrants from Muslim countries. The number of registered members of mosques increased to 80,838 in 2004, but then dropped to 72,023 in 2006. Part of the reason for the drop could be a new methodology in the compilation of statistics.

At the end of the 1990s, Islam passed the Roman Catholic Church and Pentecostalism to become the largest minority religion in Norway, provided Islam is seen as one group. However, as of 2013, the Roman Catholic Church regained its position as the largest minority religion in Norway due to increasing immigration from European countries and less immigration from Muslim-majority countries. In 2009, the total number of registered Muslim congregations was 126. More than 40 prayer locations exist in the city of Oslo.

In 2010 a Muslim from Örebro in Sweden wanted to build a mosque in Tromsø with money from Saudi Arabia but the Norwegian government declined to give permission on the grounds that Saudi Arabia has no freedom of religion and potential Norwegian money to churches in the opposite direction would be stopped as churches are illegal there.

In June 2018, the parliament of Norway passed a bill banning clothing covering the face at educational institutions as well as daycare centres, which included face-covering Islamic veils. The prohibition applies to pupils and staff alike.

== Religiosity ==
Studies conducted for a TV channel in 2006 found that 18% of Norwegian Muslims reported visiting the mosque once a week. A similar study in 2007 reported that 36% of Muslim youth visit the mosque less than once a month.

According to a 2007/2008 survey of students at upper secondary schools in Oslo, 25% of Muslims pray regularly while 12% attend religious services weekly.

=== Opinion ===
According to a survey in 2016, about 98% of Norwegian Muslims believed that Human rights are important, about 94% believed Democracy is important, and 95% believed that Muslims should live in peace with Non-Muslims. In the same poll a minority of 47% said that it is not important to follow Sharia.

According to a 2017 poll, 3 out of 10 Muslims agree it's important to follow Sharia.

According to a survey of 4,000 Muslims in 2017, only two percent agreed to statements such as "Islam allows the use of violence" and that the September 11 attacks on America in 2001 can be justified.

=== Radicalizations ===
About 70 people have left Norway to become foreign fighters in Syria or Iraq, while around 20 have returned.

In May 2019 it was announced that those who had joined the Islamic State who only had residence permits in Norway would have their permits annulled to prevent them from returning to Norway. And in September 2019, 15 foreigners in Norway had their residence permits revoked.

=== Conversion ===
In 2004, it was estimated that 500–1,000 Norwegians have converted to Islam. Many Norwegians, both men and women, have converted in order to marry Muslims.

== Demographics ==
Historical population
Year	Pop.	±%
1980	1,006	—
1990	54,000	+5267.8%
2000	56,458	+4.6%
2010	144,000	+155.1%
2020	182,607	+26.8%
Note: 1990 data, 2010 data, 2018 data

Muslims in Norway are a very fragmented group, coming from many different backgrounds. Kari Vogt estimated in 2000 that there were about 500 Norwegian converts to Islam. The rest are mostly first or second-generation immigrants from a number of countries. The largest immigrant communities from Muslim countries in Norway are from Pakistan, Iraq and Somalia:

Country of origin	Number (2008)
Pakistan	30,134
Somalia	27,881
Iraq	21,795
Bosnia and Herzegovina	15,649
Iran	15,134
Turkey	15,003
Converts	1,000-3,000

An unknown, but presumably high, proportion of these immigrant populations is Muslim. In other words, the largest group of Norwegian Muslims originate in Pakistan, but no single nationality constitute as much as a quarter of the total population.

The Turkish, Pakistani and Iranian communities are quite established in Norway. 55% of Iranians have lived in Norway for more than 10 years. The Iraqis are a more recent group, with 80% of the Iraqi community having arrived in the past 10 years.

In the 1990s there was a wave of asylum seekers from the Balkans, mostly Bosniaks. In recent years most immigrants arrive as part of family reunification.

According to the Verdens Gang newspaper, during the 1990s around 500 people converted to Islam in Norway and this number increased to around 3,000 in 2019.

=== By electoral districts (2019) ===
Population of Muslims by Norwegian electoral districts:
Electoral districts	% Muslim	# Muslim
Oslo	9.5%	64 882
Akershus	3.8%	23 812
Østfold	4.6%	13 620
Buskerud	4.6%	13 011
Rogaland	2.5%	11 742
Hordaland	1.5%	7 837
Vestfold	2.3%	5 820
Telemark	2.8%	4 796
Vest-Agder	2.4%	4 565
Hedmark	1.5%	3 045
Oppland	1.6%	3 005
Nordland	1.1%	2 593
Møre og Romsdal	1.0%	2 635
Trøndelag	1.5%	7 017
Troms	1.3%	2 170
Aust-Agder	1.7%	2 051
Sogn og Fjordane	1.2%	1 359
Finnmark	1.4%	1 029
Norway	3.3%	175 507

=== By region (2019) ===
Region	Percent Muslim
Eastern Norway	4.9%
Western Norway	1.7%
Trøndelag	1.5%
Southern Norway	2.2%
Northern Norway	1.2%

Year	Muslims	Percent
2006	76,000	1.6%
2010	144,000	2.9%
2018	166,861	3.2%
2030	359,000	6.3%

== Organizations ==
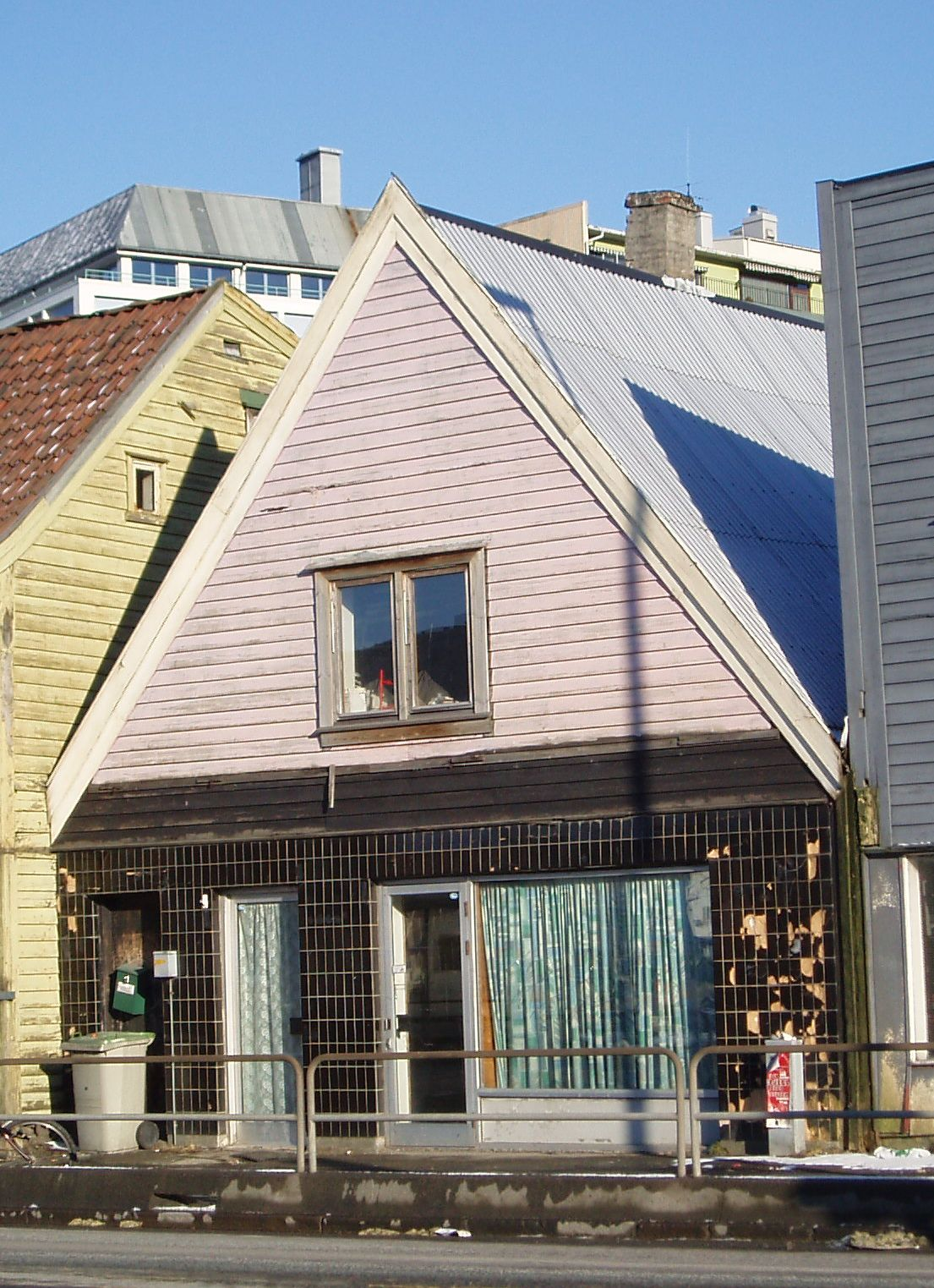
The mosque of The Islamic Association of Bergen (Det Islamske Forbundet i Bergen), like most Norwegian mosques is situated in a regular town house.

Mosques have been important, not just as places of prayer, but also as a meeting place for members of minority groupings. Several mosques also do different forms of social work, e.g. organising the transport of deceased members back to their countries of origin for burial. The mosques are mostly situated in regular city blocks, and are not easily visible features of the cities.

Some of the earliest attempts to organize Islamic worship in Norway was done by labor organizations as early Muslims were labor migrants. The first mosque was established in 1972 by Pakistani immigrants. Another mosque, the Islamic Cultural Centre (ICC) opened in Oslo in 1974. The initiative for the mosque came from Pakistanis who were helped by the Islamic Cultural Centre which had already opened in Copenhagen in Denmark. The new mosque adhered to the deobandi branch of Sunni Islam. Adherents of the Sufi inspired Barelwi movement, who constituted the majority of Pakistanis in Norway, soon felt the need for a mosque of their own, and opened the Central Jamaat-e Ahl-e Sunnat in 1976. Today this is the second largest mosque in Norway, with over 6,000 members. The first Shia mosque, Anjuman-e hussaini, was founded in 1975, and until 1994 was the only Shia congregation. The Tablighi Jamaat came to Norway in 1977. An Albanian mosque was established in 1989, and a Bosnian mosque in the 1990s. Until the 1990s, mosques and Islamic organizations in Norway were established along ethnic lines. Such establishments were by immigrants from Pakistan, Turkey, Morocco, Arab world, Somalia, The Gambia and Bosnia.

Starting c. 1990, Muslims of different ethnicities and sects came together to form umbrella organizations. The Muslim Defence Committee was established in 1989 to give an Islamic response to the Salman Rushdie affair. The Islamic Women's Group of Norway and Urtehagen Foundation were established in 1991, and in 1993 the Islamic Council of Norway was established to conduct dialogue with the Church of Norway. Another major change in the 1990s was that mosques became more inclusive to women. For example, in 1999 the ICC began offering Arabic and Qur'an classes to women and including women in Eid prayers.

Also in the 1990s, Muslim youth and student associations were established. In 1995, the Muslim Student Society (MSS) was founded at the University of Oslo, driven by a need to find prayer space for Islamic prayer. The MSS soon expanded its activities to include conducting interfaith dialogue, courses on dawah, iftar during Ramadan, and other community projects. In 1996, the Muslim Youth of Norway (NMU) was founded. In 1999, NMU began publishing Explore (later called Ung Muslim) a magazine geared towards Norwegian Muslim youth.

By 2005, only one purpose-built mosque existed in Norway, built by the Sufi-inspired Sunni Muslim World Islamic Mission in Oslo in 1995. Minhaj-ul-Quran International established its mosque and centre in 1987. In 2000, this was the first Norwegian mosque to start performing the adhan - the call to prayer. Initially, the mosque received permission from Gamle Oslo borough to perform the adhan once a week. This was appealed to county authorities by the Progress Party. The ruling of the fylkesmann (county governor) of Oslo and Akershus stated that no permission was required for performing the adhan, leaving the mosque free to perform it at their own discretion. The mosque decided to limit themselves to performing the adhan once a week.

While less than 10% of Muslims were members of an Islamic organization in 1980, this figure rose to 50% in 1990, and increased to 55% by 2007.

=== Umbrella organisations ===
The main umbrella organization in Norway is the Islamic Council Norway, which was set up in 1993. As of 2008, it comprises 40 member organisations totalling 60,000 members. One researcher estimates it represents 50-75% of all Norwegian Muslims. Since 1997, the Islamic Council has also had Shia representation. The Islamic Council is regularly consulted by the government in matters of religion. The council is also involved with interfaith dialogue, particularly with the Church of Norway. In 2009, the Islamic Council publicly denounced harassment of homosexuals. Minhaj-ul-Quran has a branch in Norway and community centre was established in Oslo in 1987. In 1991, the Islamic Women's Group Norway (Islamsk Kvinnegruppe Norge) was founded, after an initiative by the Norwegian convert Nina Torgersen. In 1995, a Muslim Students' Society (Muslimsk Studentsamfunn) was established at the University of Oslo, with some of its officers, such as Mohammad Usman Rana, becoming important voices in the Norwegian public sphere. The Islamic foundation Urtehagen was established in 1991 by the Norwegian convert Trond Ali Linstad, at first running a kindergarten and youth club. In 1993, Linstad applied for the first time to establish a Muslim private school. The Labour Party government of Gro Harlem Brundtland rejected the application in 1995, stating that it would be "detrimental to the integration of the children". After the Labour government was replaced by the government of Kjell Magne Bondevik of the Christian People's Party in 1997, Linstad applied again, and his application was approved in 1999. In August 2001, Urtehagen School (Urtehagen friskole) opened with 75 pupils. However, internal conflicts at the school led to its closure in the spring of 2004. Plans to open a similar school in Drammen in 2006 were blocked after the new center-left government stopped all new private schools after coming to power in 2005.

=== Ahmadiyya ===
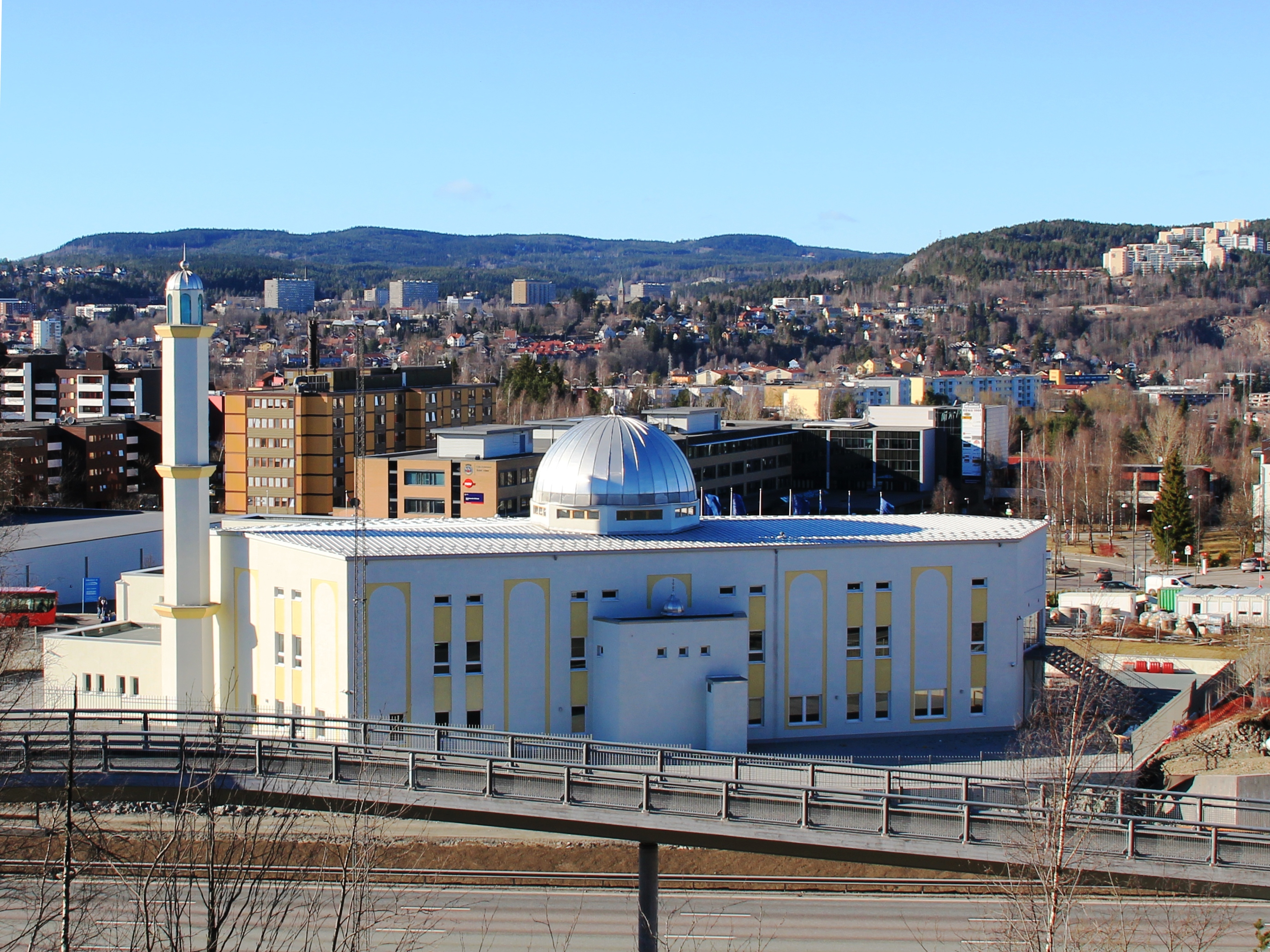
Baitun Nasr Mosque, the mosque of the Ahmadiyya Muslim Community in Northeast of Oslo

Various Ahmadi mosques include Noor Mosque, opened in Oslo August 1, 1980, and Baitun Nasr Mosque in Furuset, Oslo. There are about 1,700 Ahmadi Muslims in Norway. The majority of the Ahmadi Muslims in Norway are from Pakistan.

=== Salafi ===
Profetens Ummah is a Salafist organisation notorious for its statements and vocal demonstrations praising Islamic terrorism. Many Norwegian jihadi fighters for ISIL have links with the organizations, and some Norwegians who joined ISIL were also members of the radical organization Islam Net, founded in 2008.

=== Non-Denominational Islam ===
In June 2017, Thee Yezen al-Obaide revealed plans to create a mosque in Oslo named Masjid al-Nisa (The Women's Mosque). In an interview, al-Obaide described the mosque as "a feminist mosque where women have as much space as men. Both men and women should be able to lead prayers, and all genders should be able to pray in the same room." The mosque will also be open to LGBT people and has been compared to the Ibn Ruschd-Goethe mosque in Germany and the Mariam Mosque in Denmark.

== Culture ==
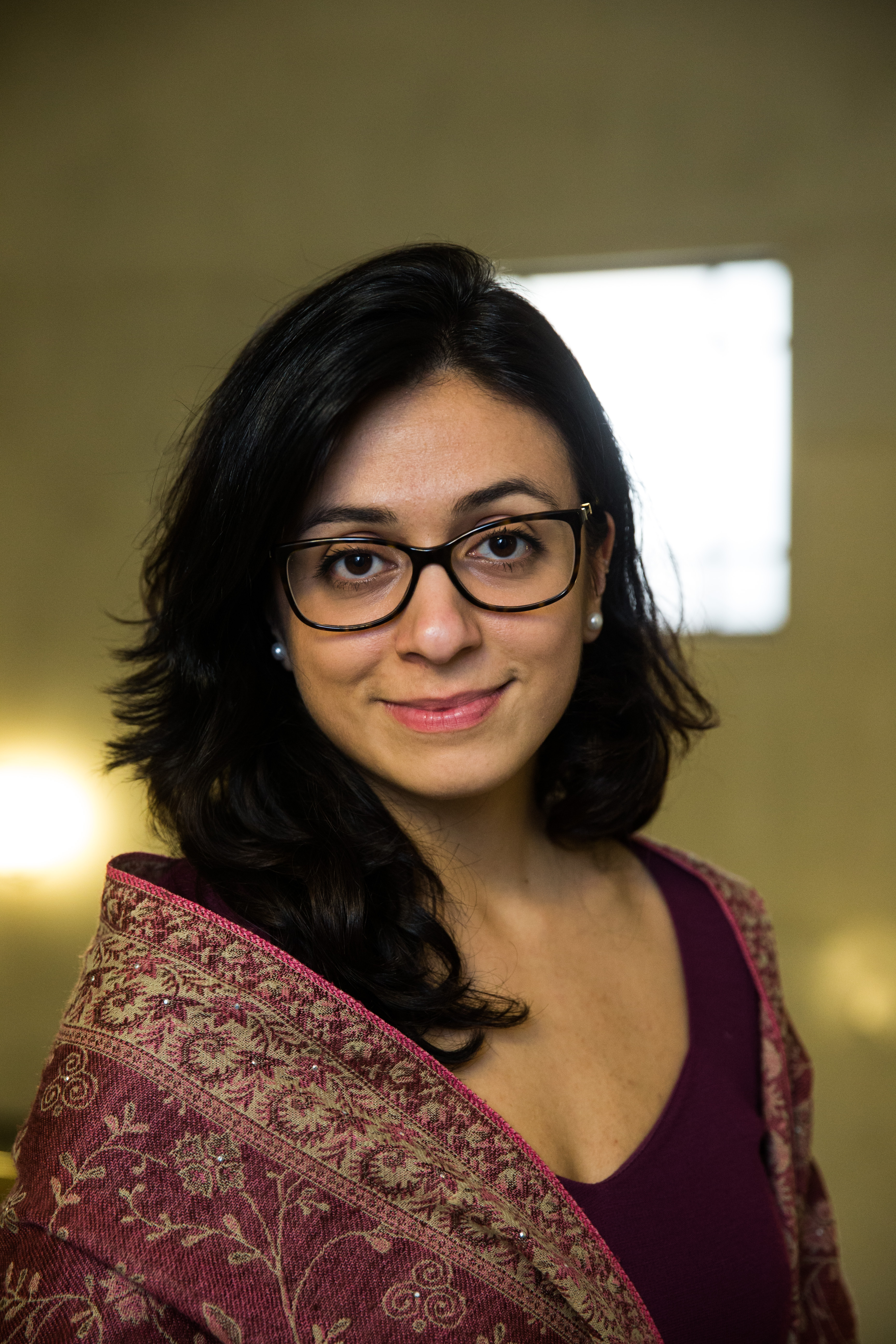
Hadia Tajik- First Muslim MP and minister in Norway

Since 2007, the Islamic Cultural Centre stages an Eid Mela annually that attracts around 5,000 visitors. The event involves food, concerts, and other activities.

=== Islamic dress ===
In 2007, a debate arose over banning face veils in higher education but institutions advised against such a bill. Similar debates occurred in 2010 but again did not result in a ban. In 2012, a student at the University of Tromsø was expelled from class by a professor but no general ban was adopted. However, the Oslo City Council and County Board of Østfold banned niqabs in teaching situations at their high schools. Norwegian law does not make reference to the right for people to wear religious headgear, but the issue is part of by the Working Environment Act and the Gender Equality Act. The Norwegian Labour Inspectorate considers refusal to accommodate religious headgear as discrimination. Hijabs have been incorporated into uniforms in the army, healthcare, etc.

In a 2014 poll conducted by the Norwegian Directorate of Integration and Diversity, a majority of Norwegians held negative views over the wearing of the hijab outside the home. Stronger disagreement (75%) was expressed towards the hijab being part of the police uniform in Norway. Concerning the full-cover niqab, 86% expressed a negative or very negative opinion.

In June 2017, the Norwegian government proposed rules banning female students from wearing full-face veils. Education Minister Torbjørn Røe Isaksen said that in their perspective, full-face veils like the hijab have no place in educational settings since they hinder good communication. The administration is subsequently examining the likelihood of controlling the utilization of such pieces of clothing in childcare focuses, schools and colleges.

The Prime Minister of Norway Erna Solberg stated in an interview that in Norwegian work environments it is essential to see each other's faces and therefore anyone who insists on wearing a niqab is in practice unemployable. Solberg also views the wearing of the niqab as a challenge to social boundaries in the Norwegian society, a challenge that would be countered by Norway setting boundaries of its own. Solberg also stated that anyone may wear what they wish in their spare time and that her comments applied to professional life but that any immigrant has the obligation to adapt to Norwegian work life and culture.

In June 2018, the parliament of Norway passed a bill banning clothing covering the face at educational institutions as well as daycare centres, which included face-covering Islamic veils. The prohibition applies to pupils and staff alike.

In April 2019, telecom company Telia received bomb threats after featuring a Muslim woman taking off her hijab in a commercial. Although the police considered unlikely that the threat would be carried out, delivering such threats is still a crime in Norway.

== Interfaith relations ==
Following the 2015 Copenhagen shootings, Norwegian Muslims were among those taking part in a vigil on February 21, 2015, evening, in which they joined hands with Norwegian Jews and others to form a symbolic protective ring around the Norwegian capital's main synagogue.

In 2010, the Norwegian Broadcasting Corporation after one year of research, revealed that antisemitism was common among Norwegian Muslims. Such antisemitism was condemned by Muslim organizations in Norway.

A 2017 study by the Norwegian Center for Studies of the Holocaust and Religious Minorities found that negative attitudes towards Muslims and Jews were prevalent. 34% of Norwegians had negative attitudes towards Muslims. Among Muslim immigrants who have lived in Norway for at least 5 years, 28.9% had negative attitudes towards Jews (compared to 8.3% for the population). The survey also found that a majority of Norwegian Jews and Norwegian Muslims believed in cooperating with one another to fight discrimination.

== Discrimination ==
Islamophobia refers to the set of discourses, behaviours and structures which express feelings fear, towards Islam and Muslims in Norway. Islamophobia can manifest itself through discrimination in the workforce, negative coverage in the media, and violence against Muslims. In 2004 the slogan, "Ikke mobb kameraten min (Don't touch my hijab)," was adopted by a Norwegian protest movement focused around the case of Ambreen Pervez and a proposed hijab ban. Pervez was told by her employer that she was not to wear her hijab to work. The slogan was an adaption of the French slogans, "Ne touche pas a mon pote (Don't touch my buddy)," and, "Touche pas à mon foulard (Don't touch my hijab.)" A number of employment discrimination cases in Norway arose over the wearing of the hijab.

== Public opinion ==
A 2005 study analyzed the portrayal of Muslims in the 8 largest newspapers of Norway. It found that Muslims were generally portrayed negatively, even more negatively than other immigrants, and only 3% of the articles portrayed Muslims positively.

In a 2014 poll conducted by the Norwegian Directorate of Integration and Diversity, 5 of 10 Norwegians considered Islamic values to be either completely or partially incompatible with Norwegian society.

According to a 2017 poll study by the Norwegian Center for Studies of the Holocaust and Religious Minorities, 34.1% of the population showed strong prejudice against Muslims: 27.8% feels "disgusted" by Muslims; 19.6% would not want Muslims as neighbors; 42% thought that Muslims did not want to integrate into Norway; 39% saw Muslims as a "threat" to Norwegian culture; 31% thought that Muslims wanted to take over Europe. These figures were slightly lower than those from a similar study made in 2011. Nevertheless 75% of Norwegians condemned acts of anti-Muslim violence.

According to a 2020 poll conducted by the Norwegian Directorate of Integration and Diversity, a slight majority of people of Norway (52%) consider Islam incompatible with fundamental values of the Norwegian society. This result had been similar for the last 15 years. By comparison, only a minority (22%) considered Buddhism incompatible with Norwegian values.

== See also ==
- Iraqis in Norway
- Norwegians with Pakistani background
- Syrians in Norway
- Norwegian Iranians
- Ahmadiyya in Norway
- History of Islam in the Arctic and Subarctic regions

== Sources ==
- Jacobsen, Christine (May 7, 2009). "Norway". In Göran Larsson (ed.). Islam in the Nordic and Baltic Countries. Routledge.
- Jacobsen, Christine (December 17, 2010). Islamic Traditions and Muslim Youth in Norway. Brill publishers. ISBN 9789004178908.
- Strabac, Zan; Valenta, Marko (March 1, 2013). "Attitudes towards Muslims in Norway". In Marc Helbling (ed.). Islamophobia in the West: Measuring and Explaining Individual Attitudes. Routledge.
- Cesari, Jocelyne (2014). The Oxford Handbook of European Islam. Oxford University Press. ISBN 9780199607976.
- Haddad, Yvonne Yazbeck (April 11, 2012). "Integration through Islam? Muslims in Norway". Muslims in the West: From Sojourners to Citizens. Oxford University Press.
- Leirvik, Oddbjorn [in Norwegian] (2009). "Norwegen - Norway". In Ednan Aslan (ed.). Islamic Education in Europe. Böhlau Verlag.
- Nielsen, Jørgen; Akgönül, Samim; Alibašić, Ahmet; Racius, Egdunas (2014). Yearbook of Muslims in Europe, Volume 6. BRILL. ISBN 9789004283053.
- Leirvik, Oddbjørn (March 19, 2014). "Islam and Christian-Muslim relations in Norway" (PDF). - Northern Scholar lecture, University of Edinburgh
- Roald, Anne Sofie (2004). New Muslims in the European Context. Brill. ISBN 9789047402947.
