= List of foreign politicians of Pakistani origin =

This list contains articles about political officeholders outside of Pakistan, who are of Pakistani origin.

== Australia ==
- Mehreen Faruqi, member of the Australian Senate for Greens, and former MP in the New South Wales Legislative Council.
- Irfan Yusuf, former Liberal Party politician

== Central African Republic ==
- Saif Durbar, Deputy Foreign Minister of Central African Republic

== Canada ==
- Shafqat Ali, Liberal MP for Brampton—Chinguacousy Park
- Salma Ataullahjan, Conservative Senator for Ontario.
- Wajid Khan, former Liberal, later Conservative, MP for Mississauga—Streetsville
- Iqra Khalid, Liberal MP for Mississauga—Erin Mills
- Yasir Naqvi, Liberal MP for Ottawa Centre
- Aslam Rana, Liberal MP for Hamilton Centre
- Salma Zahid, Liberal MP for Scarborough Centre—Don Valley East
- Sameer Zuberi, Liberal MP for Pierrefonds—Dollard

== Denmark ==
- Nadeem Farooq, member of the Folketing for the Danish Social Liberal Party.
- Kamal Qureshi, member of the Folketing for the Socialist People's Party.
- Abbas Razvi, member of the Folketing for the Danish Social Liberal Party.
- Sikandar Siddique, member of the Folketing for The Alternative.

== Indonesia ==
- Nur Indah Cintra Sukma Munsyi, member of the Regional Representative Council from East Java.

== Malaysia ==
- Musa Aman, Chief Minister of Sabah and member of UMNO.
- Yamani Hafez Musa, member of the Malaysian Parliament and Deputy Minister of Finance.
- Harris Salleh, Chief Minister of Sabah and member of BERJAYA.

== Mozambique ==
- Abdul Magid Osman, Minister of Economy and Finance of Mozambique (1986–1991) and a member of FRELIMO.

== Netherlands ==
- Fahid Minhas, member of the House of Representatives for the People's Party for Freedom and Democracy.
- Mariëlle Paul, member of the House of Representatives for the People's Party for Freedom and Democracy.

== New Zealand ==
- Ashraf Choudhary, member of the New Zealand Parliament for the Labour Party.

== Norway ==
- Akhtar Chaudhry, former member and Fourth Vice President of the Storting for the Socialist Left Party.
- Lubna Jaffery, member of the Storting for the Labour Party.
- Mudassar Kapur, member of the Storting for the Conservative Party.
- Afshan Rafiq, member of the Storting for the Conservative Party.
- Abid Raja, member and former Fifth Vice President of the Storting for the Liberal Party, and Minister of Culture (2020–21).
- Hadia Tajik, member of the Storting for the Labour Party, Minister of Culture (2012–13), and Minister of Labour and Social Inclusion (2021–22).
- Shahbaz Tariq, member of the Storting for the Labour Party.

== Singapore ==
- Raeesah Khan, member of the Parliament of Singapore for the Workers' Party.

== Thailand ==
- Swab Phaoprathan, member of the House of Representatives for the Bhumjaithai Party.
- Chada Thaiseth, member of the Thai parliament.
- Mananya Thaiseth, Deputy Agriculture Minister of Thailand.

== United Kingdom ==
- Imran Ahmad Khan, former Conservative Party and then independent MP for Wakefield; suspended and resigned.
- Tasmina Ahmed-Sheikh, member of the Alba Party, former Scottish National Party MP for Ochil and South Perthshire.
- Zubir Ahmed, Labour MP for Glasgow South West.
- Tahir Ali, Labour MP for Birmingham Hall Green.
- Rosena Allin-Khan, Labour MP for Tooting.
- Adnan Hussain, Independent Alliance MP for Blackburn.
- Imran Hussain, Labour MP for Bradford East
- Sajid Javid, former Conservative MP for Bromsgrove.
- Ayoub Khan, Independent Alliance MP for Birmingham Perry Bar.
- Afzal Khan, Labour MP for Manchester Gorton
- Sadiq Khan, former Labour MP for Tooting and incumbent Mayor of London.
- Khalid Mahmood, former Labour Party MP for Birmingham Perry Bar.
- Shabana Mahmood, Labour MP for Birmingham Ladywood.
- Anas Sarwar, former Labour regional MSP for Glasgow.
- Mohammed Sarwar, former Labour MP for Glasgow Central.
- Zarah Sultana, Independent Alliance MP for Coventry South.
- Sayeeda Warsi, Baroness Warsi, cross bench member of the House of Lords, formerly Conservative.
- Humza Yousaf, Scottish National Party MSP for Glasgow Pollok, former First Minister of Scotland.
- Shabana Mahmood, Home Secretary for the UK Government.

== United States ==
- Saqib Ali, member of the Maryland House of Delegates for the Democratic Party.
