= Aamir J. Sheikh =

Norwegian politician

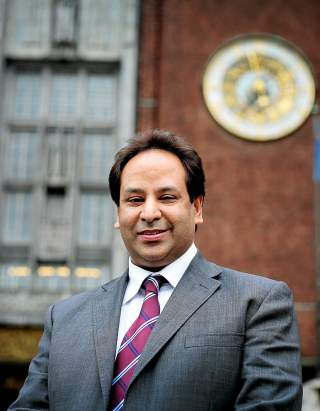
Aamir J. Sheikh

Aamir Javed Sheikh (born 3 March 1970 in Gujrat, Pakistan) is a Norwegian-Pakistani local politician. Sheikh was member of Oslo City council for the Høyre Party from 1995 to 2011.

Aamir J. Sheikh came to Norway when he was eight, and grew up in Oslo. Sheikh is married to Afshan Rafiq, who was Norway's first full member of the Norwegian Parliament Stortinget (for Høyre) from a minority background (Athar Ali and Shahbaz Tariq were both deputy representatives).

Since 2003, Aamir J. Sheikh has been the leader of the 14 August committee to celebrate Pakistan's national day in Norway. As the leader of the 14 August committee, he presented the Bridge Builder of the Year Award to King Harald in 2006 in Oslo.

Sheikh was also the leader of the 17 May committee in Oslo in 2008 (to celebrate Norway's national day). Aamir Javed Sheikh has since been leader of the group Dialogue for peace.

Mr. Sheikh is founder and president of the Foundation Dialogue for Peace Norway since 2004. He was member of the Oslo Parliament, Norway 1995 – 2011. Political adviser to the Conservative Party (2001 – 2003) He has also been vice chairman of Center against Ethnic Discrimination of Norway 2002 – 2006 and Head of 17 May Committee 2008 (Norway's National day celebration committee) He is also President Norway Pakistan Chamber of Commerce and Chairman of the 14 August Committee Norway since 2003.
