= Central Jamaat-e Ahl-e Sunnat =

Mosque in Oslo, Norway

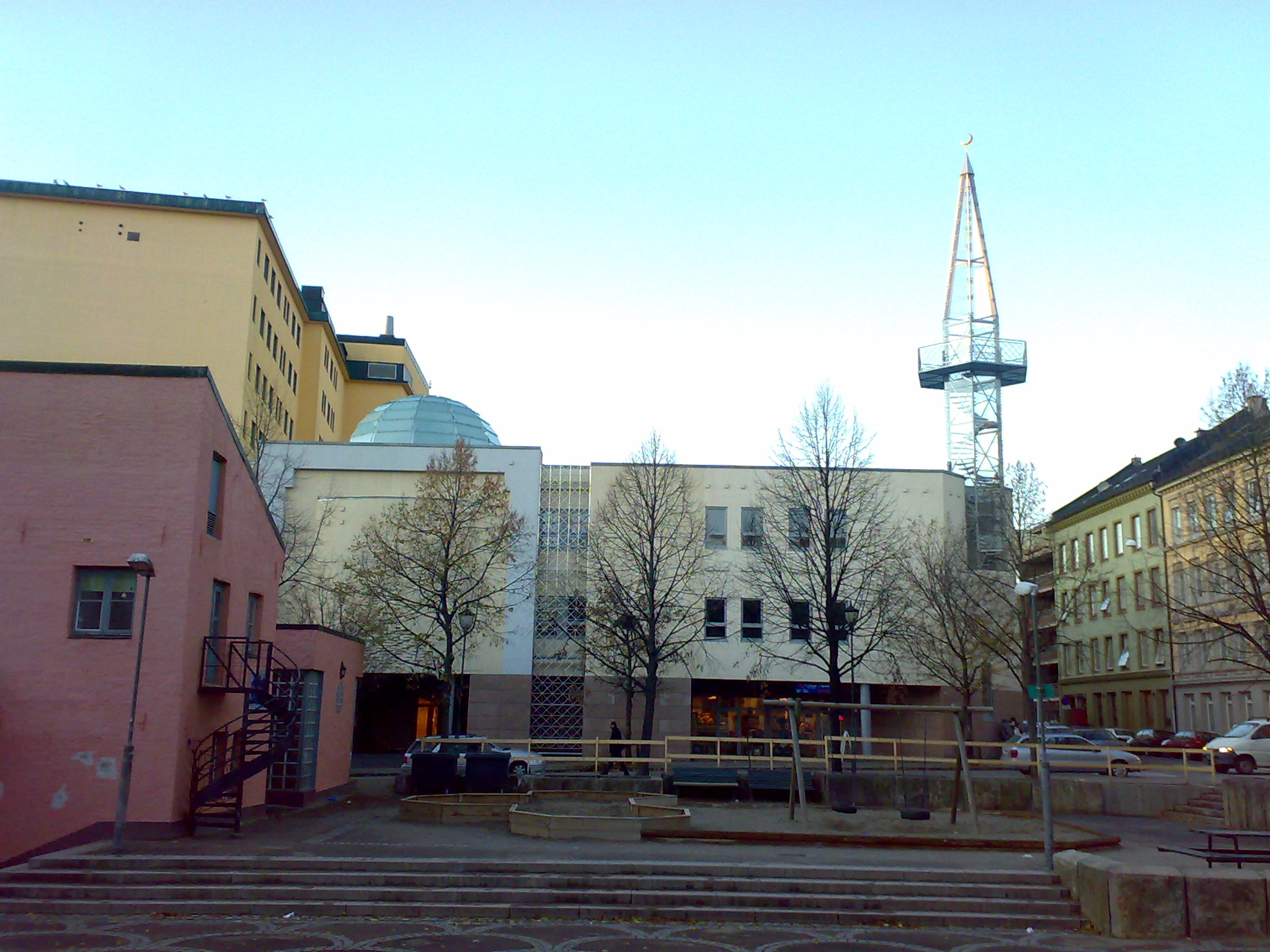

- Location of the mosque in Oslo

Religion
- Affiliation: Barelvi
- Leadership: Nehmat Ali Shah (imam)

Location
- Location: Oslo
- Country: Norway
- Interactive map of Central Jamaat-e Ahl-e Sunnat
- Coordinates: 59°54′53″N 10°45′51″E

Architecture
- Established: 1976 (as a congregation)
- Completed: 2006 (current building)
- Construction cost: kr 93 million

Specifications
- Capacity: 2,500 worshippers
- Interior area: 6,200 m^{2} (67,000 sq ft)
- Minaret: One

Website
- cjas.no (in Norwegian)

The Central Jamaat-e Ahl-e Sunnat is a congregation and mosque of the Pakistani community in Oslo, Norway with 6,000 members, making it the largest mosque in the country. Within Sunni Islam, the mosque is affiliated with Sufism and the Barelvi movement.

== History ==
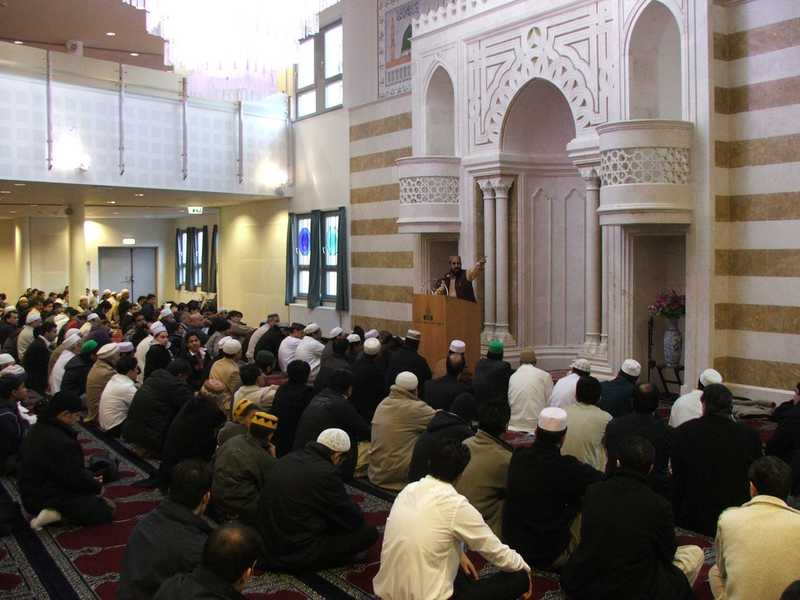
The mosque during a sermon

The congregation was founded in 1976 after a group of Sufi-oriented first-generation Pakistani immigrants split from the Islamic Cultural Centre. The mosque has later seen many splits and internal conflicts. In 1984 a faction split to form a World Islamic Mission congregation, and in 1989 the founder Ahmad Mustaq Chisti was expelled, which resulted in street fights outside the mosque. Internal family-based power struggles about the leadership in the congregation led to violent fights in the mosque in 2006.

In 2006 a new mosque building, Jamea Masjid was opened in Motzfeldts gate 10, with 6,200 square metres (67,000 sq ft) and room for 2,500 people. The mosque cost kr 93 million (US$14.5 million) to construct, financed through loans and wealthy Pakistanis.

The mosque's imam Nehmat Ali Shah was in 2014 assaulted and stabbed outside his home. Two men (including the alleged planner of the attack, a man of Pakistani background), were later arrested for the attack charged with inflicting grievous bodily harm. A woman was also charged with attempting to cover up the crime. The following year, mosque chairman Ghulam Sarwar was assaulted outside his home.

The mosque was one of five mosques that founded the Islamic Council Norway, an umbrella group of Muslims in Norway, in 1993.

=== 2024 shooting threat ===
On April 6, 2024, a white supremacist threatened and supposedly planned an attack on the mosque using an assault rifle, using the social network app, Discord. A photo was posted with a rifle, a combat vest and a piece of paper which said “THIS IS MY GUN, CENTRAL JAM-E MOSQUE, TMD NORWAY”, along with a map with routes to three mosques, with Central Jamaat being number “1”. The photo garnered attention and police were notified, leading them to increased security around the mosque.

== Imam ==
The mosque's imam Nehmat Ali Shah, along with mosque chairman Ghulam Sarwar sparked controversy in 2013 after saying in an interview with Dagsavisen that the media was "run by Jews" who portrayed Islam in a negative way. In the same interview, Sarwar rhetorically asked "why the Germans killed them [the Jews]", suggesting that the Holocaust could be explained as a consequence of Jews being "unruly people in the world".

In 2016, Shah took part in a demonstration outside the Pakistani embassy in Oslo, and later attended a memorial rally in Pakistan, in honour of Mumtaz Qadri, the Islamic extremist convicted for the murder of the Punjab Governor Salman Taseer, who had opposed Pakistan's blasphemy law. His high-profile participation at both events (at which he gave speeches) caused a major controversy. Shah has stated that he otherwise supports Sharia-sanctioned capital punishment. In a press conference by the congregation after his return to Norway it was announced that Shah would continue in his position (since 1992) as the mosque's head imam.

The mosque receives approximately kr 3 million annually in public funds, including funding for "dialogue work" that has been publicly supported and praised by several Norwegian government ministers and royalty. In 2007, Foreign Minister Jonas Gahr Støre praised Shah for "defending freedom of religion" after the Oslo Synagogue attack.

== See also ==
- Islam in Norway
- List of mosques in Norway
