= Norway–Pakistan relations =

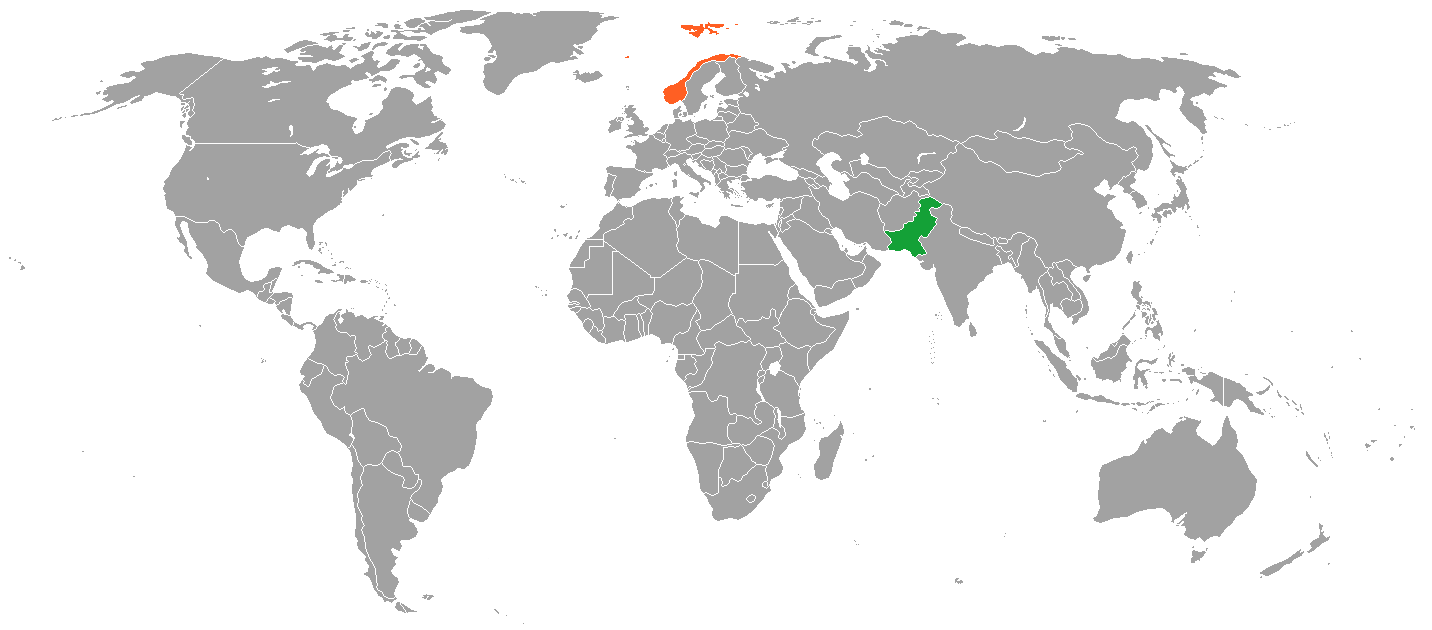
- Pakistan: Norway

Norway–Pakistan relations are foreign relations between Norway and Pakistan.

== Historical relations ==
Norway and Pakistan established diplomatic relations on 18 December 1948.

Early connections included Norwegian scholars like Georg Morgenstierne, who studied Pashto and Indo-Iranian languages in the 1920s, and Fredrik Barth, an anthropologist who documented Pathan culture in the Swat Valley from the 1950s to the 1980s. Norwegian climbers, including Arne Næss, scaled Pakistan’s Tirich Mir peaks in 1950 and 1964.

Norway’s engagement with Pakistan began in the 1950s with development projects. In the 1970s, Pakistani migrant workers became the first non-Western immigrant group in Norway.

Pakistanis form one of the largest immigrant communities in Norway. Most Pakistani immigrants in Norway originate from the tehsil Kharian in Punjab and primarily reside in Oslo and Drammen.

During the 2026 Iran war, Norway's foreign minister Espen Barth Eide and deputy foreign minister Andreas Motzfeldt Kravik expressed their support for Pakistan's diplomatic efforts towards reaching a political resolution of the conflict. In August 2026, Eide visited Pakistan, the first trip by a Norwegian foreign minister to the country in a decade, and reiterated his support for Pakistan's diplomacy by terming it a "service to the world".

== Political relations ==
Norway provides development assistance to Pakistan, particularly in governance and education.

In 2022, Norway and Pakistan co-chaired a UN climate summit. Additionally, during his 2022 visit to Karachi, Norwegian Ambassador Per Albert Ilsaas emphasized strengthening bilateral relations, particularly in trade and investment.

On 11 November 2025, a unique development occurred when the ambassador of Norway, Per Albert Ilsaas, was reported to be present in supreme court which was undergoing the case hearing of Imaan Mazari, this unauthorized move prompted the government to issue a diplomatic demarche to Norway over cases of interference in internal matters and violation of diplomatic protocols.

== Cultural relations ==
Pakistani migration to Norway began in the late 1960s, forming a well-integrated diaspora of nearly 40,000 people, mostly from Gujrat.

Norway has contributed to the documentation and preservation of Pakistan's cultural heritage on a smaller scale. Pakistan also operates an Antarctic research station in the Norwegian-claimed Antarctic territory of Queen Maud Land.

The 1990s and 2000s saw increased people-to-people ties, with thousands of Pakistani students attending Norwegian universities. Norad’s NORPART program has strengthened academic ties through student exchange and curriculum development.

== Economic relations ==
Norway’s support for Pakistan includes economic development through governance and education programs.

In 2017, bilateral trade reached US$128 million.

In 2021, a notable investment collaboration happened between Nizam Energy and Norwegian firm Scatec Solar’s solar plant in Sukkur.

In 2022, Norway exported NOK 559 million in goods to Pakistan and imported NOK 1,079 million. Norway also provided NOK 130 million in bilateral aid to Pakistan, focusing on food security, climate resilience, and education.Norway was a significant investor in Pakistan that year, with major companies like Telenor Group, Scatec ASA, and Jotun Paints operating in the country. Trade expanded, particularly in IT, ship-breaking, and ship-recycling. Norway also provided substantial development aid, including 227 million NOK in humanitarian assistance following Pakistani floods.

== Military relations ==
Norwegian and Pakistani police collaborate on transnational crimes such as human trafficking, drug smuggling, and forced marriages. Norway has provided technical assistance to Pakistan’s police and proposed a Memorandum of Understanding on law enforcement cooperation.

== Embassies ==
Norway maintains an embassy in Islamabad and an honorary consulate in Lahore.

Pakistan has an embassy in Oslo.

== Transportation ==
Pakistan International Airlines operates two flights from Oslo Airport Gardermoen to Islamabad and Lahore.

== See also ==
- Pakistani Norwegians
