= Tomme Tønner =

- Directed by: Leon Bashir; Sebastian Dalén
- Release date: 8 January 2010
- Country: Norway
- Language: Norwegian

Tomme Tønner is a Norwegian gangster comedy written and directed by Leon Bashir and Sebastian Dalén. The film premiered in Norway on 8 January 2010. The film got a sequel Tomme Tønner 2.

== Synopsis ==
The film follows three gangsters as they try to rise up the ranks, only to face setbacks and obstacles.

== Cast ==
- Leon Bashir – Ali
- Anders Danielsen Lie – Nico
- Jenny Skavlan – Yasmin
- Kim Bodnia – Dansken
- Kyrre Hellum – Fido
- Vegar Hoel – Tommy
- Kristoffer Joner – Finish
- Bjørn Sundquist – Arve
- Yasmine Garbi – Susie
- Slavko Labovic – Leo
- Bjørn Sundquist – Arve
- Stig Frode Henriksen – Tynn-Svein
- Tommy Wirkola – Gjørme-Knut
- Lene Alexandra Øien – police
- Geir Børresen – William
- Farakh Abbas – Bobby

== Release ==
Tomme Tønner premiered in Norway on 8 January 2010. It performed well at the box office.

== Reception ==
The film was reviewed with a "die throw" of 5 in Rogalands Avis, 4 in Aftenposten, Dagsavisen, Dagbladet, Bergens Tidende, Bergensavisen and Klassekampen; 3 in VG, Stavanger Aftenblad and Fædrelandsvennen; and 2 in Adresseavisen. Dagens Næringsliv, which gave no "die throw," gave a mediocre review.

Leif Ove Larsen noted that the film was "Made in the style of Guy Ritchie's films from London's underworld" and that both it and the sequel "make fun of cultural stereotypes as well universal pretentiousness and stupidity, not the least by quoting from iconic comedies in the history of Norwegian national cinema."
