= Daud Mirza =

Pakistani-Norwegian actor

- Died: 12 May 2014

Daud Mirza (16 November 1969 – 12 May 2014) was a Pakistani-Norwegian actor.

He was born in Pakistan, and came to Norway at the age of two. In 1991 he performed in the television series Fedrelandet and the film Byttinger. He later played in the police series Fox Grønland and Kodenavn Hunter and the gangster movie Izzat as the main villain. He died in May 2014.
