= Ahmadiyya in Norway =

Islamic movement

Ahmadiyya is a religious community in Norway, under the spiritual leadership of the caliph in London. In the history of the Community it is stated that two Norwegian women converted in the 1920s. However, it was not until 1957, during the era of the Second Caliphate, when Kamal Yousuf, then a missionary in Sweden, moved to Oslo to establish the first Ahmadiyya mission in the country. Today, there are a number of mosques, including the largest mosque in Scandinavia, the Baitun Nasr Mosque, representing an estimated 1700 Ahmadi in the country.

== History ==
=== Establishment ===
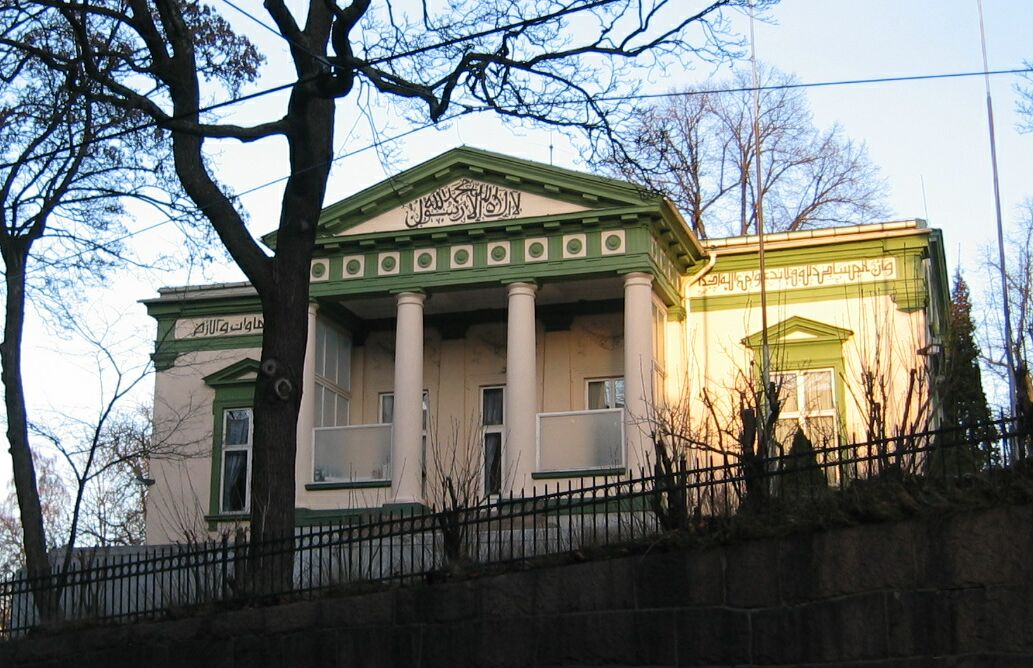
The Noor Mosque in Oslo, was the first Ahmadiyya mosque in Norway

The Ahmadiyya Community records that two Norwegian women converted in the 1920s. However, it was not until almost 40 years later, in 1957, during the era of the Second Caliphate, when Kamal Yousuf, then a missionary in Sweden, moved to Oslo to establish the first Ahmadiyya mission in the country. The move came as a consequence of three individuals who contacted Yousuf themselves, when they became interested in Islam. Following their conversion, the Ahmadiyya Community of Norway was founded. However, the Community was first officially registered in the country in 1974, following larger immigration of Pakistani Ahmadis into Norway.

=== Events ===
Among the early converts was Truls Noor Ahmad Bølstad, who later became the national head of the Ahmadiyya movement in Norway for a number of years.

In the year 1980, the Community bought a villa in Frogner, a residential borough in Oslo, which became the Community's first mosque, Noor Mosque. Five years later, in 1985 a bomb was planted inside the mosque by a 19-year old neo-nazi member of the National Democratic Party, injuring at least one Ahmadi Muslim woman. The attack took place during the month of Ramadhan.

In 2011 the Ahmadiyya caliph Mirza Masroor Ahmad inaugurated the first purpose-built Ahmadi mosque in Norway. The inauguration ceremony was attended by over 120 non-Ahmadi guests including the Minister for Defence Grete Faremo and a two-time former Prime Minister Kjell Magne Bondevik.

== Demographics ==
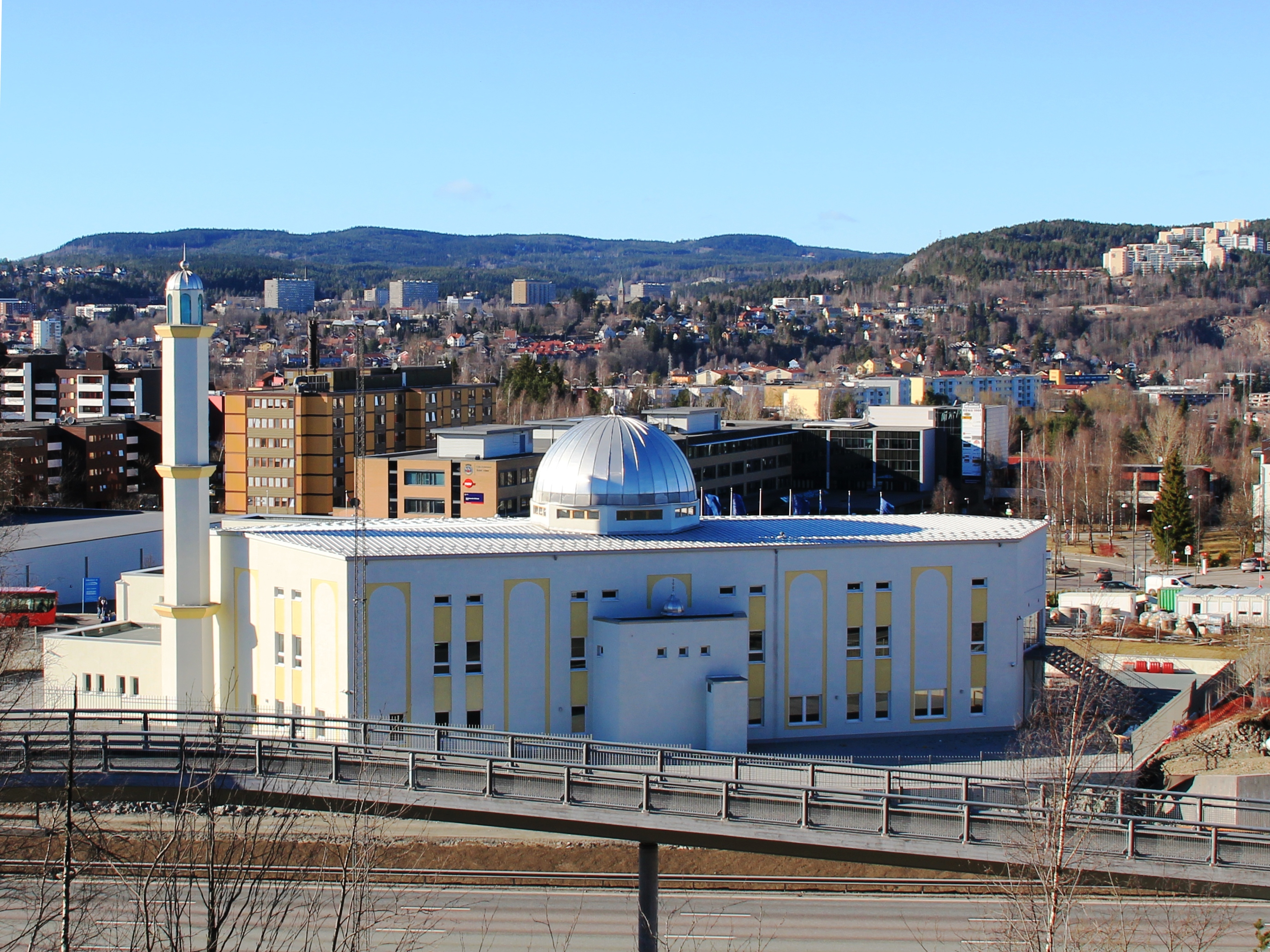
Baitul Nasr Mosque, Oslo, Norway, the largest religious temple in the country.

Today there are about 1,700 Ahmadi Muslims in Norway, the majority of which consist of immigrant populations from Pakistan. Ahmadis primarily reside in Eastern Norway.

There are at least three Ahmadi mosques in Norway. The Noor Mosque, located in Frogner, a residential borough in western Oslo, served as the national headquarters of the Community, until the 2011 construction of the Baitul Nasr Mosque in Furuset, a borough in eastern Oslo. This mosque is the largest in all of Scandinavia and can accommodate over 4,500 people. Third is Maryam Mosque located in the city of Kristiansand. It is a church which was bought and converted into mosque in 2020.

There are plans to establish mosques in several cities and towns in Norway, including Stavanger, and Honningsvåg, the northernmost city in the country. If constructed, this would make the Ahmadi mosque the northernmost mosque in the world.

== See also ==
- Islam in Norway
