= Izzat (2005 film) =

- Norwegian theatrical release poster
- Directed by: Ulrik Imtiaz Rolfsen
- Written by: Leon Bashir
- Produced by: John M. Jacobsen Sveinung Golimo
- Cinematography: Gaute Gunnari
- Edited by: Wibecke Rønseth
- Music by: Magnus Beite
- Production company: Filmkameratene AS
- Distributed by: TrustNordisk ApS
- Release dates: 7 October 2005 (domestically); 3 February 2006 (internationally)
- Running time: 107 minutes
- Country: Norway
- Languages: Norwegian, Punjabi
- Budget: 20 263 733 NOK

Izzat is a 2005 Norwegian crime and action drama, also described as Nordic Noir. The film is written by Ulrik Imtiaz Rolfsen and Leon Bashir and directed by Ulrik Imtaiz Rolfsen. The film is set in Oslo during the late 1980s and early 1990s during the main characters childhood, and the mid 2000s when the characters have grown up to be adults, with the film being narrated in periodical flashbacks. The name of the film comes from the word "Izzat", found in the languages of Bengali, Hindi, and Urdu. The word means honour and is used to describe the cultural concept of honour, especially in the context of family and the men's role to protect the reputation of women in their family. The practice is found in South Asia where it is commonly practiced especially in North India and in Pakistan as well as in their diaspora communities. The concept of izzat is a theme that is portrayed in the film, but is not the main theme of the movie.

Izzat portrays the lives of young second generation Pakistanis boys and the film draws inspiration from the lived lives and experiences of Leon Bashir and Ulrik Imataiz Rolfsen who are Norwegians with Pakistani background that grew up in Oslo around the time of the film's depiction. The Pakistani Norwegian community in Norway constitutes the oldest and largest non-wester/non-European Immigrant community in Norway. The Pakistani criminal gangs that are depicted in the film is inspired by the real Pakistani gang from Norway in the late 80s called The Young Guns which later merged into a new gang called the A-gang.

== Plot ==
During the 1980s and 1990s, a new wave of criminals is emerging in Oslo. They are more international and more dangerous than the capital has ever witnessed before. Norwegian drug kingpins are attacking the new immigrant criminal gangs who wish to get the profits of selling heroin to themselves. A battle where a lot of blood is to be shed before it could stabilise is on the horizon. Amid this, three immigrant boys by the name of Wasim, Riaz and Munawar all coming from the Norwegian Pakistani community are growing up on the east side of Oslo. They feel like Norwegians and expect the same respect any other Norwegian would have. However, they soon learn that with their immigrant background they are far away from getting a good job that pays well. Life is also boring growing up in the safest city in the world, and the boys find school to be a drag. The three boys would rather do more exciting things than school. They decide to take a shortcut in gaining respect by joining the gang of East Side Crew, which is led by the local petty criminals Sadiq and his brother Khalid.

Wasim and his two friends find their status in the local community to be rising and their peers giving them more respect as they suddenly get money from their gang activities. Something the three boys had never experienced before was having their own money. Suddenly Wasim's father discovers what his son has been doing in his spare time and the father decides to send Wasim to a distant aunt who lives in Pakistan so that Wasim can attend Madrasa in her village. After two years Wasim returns to his family in Norway, he finds out that the family situation has bettered, and they have more material possessions. Wasim quickly finds out that the middle-class life in Stovner is too boring for his taste and resumes his criminal life with Riaz and Munawar and the rest of the East Side Crew.

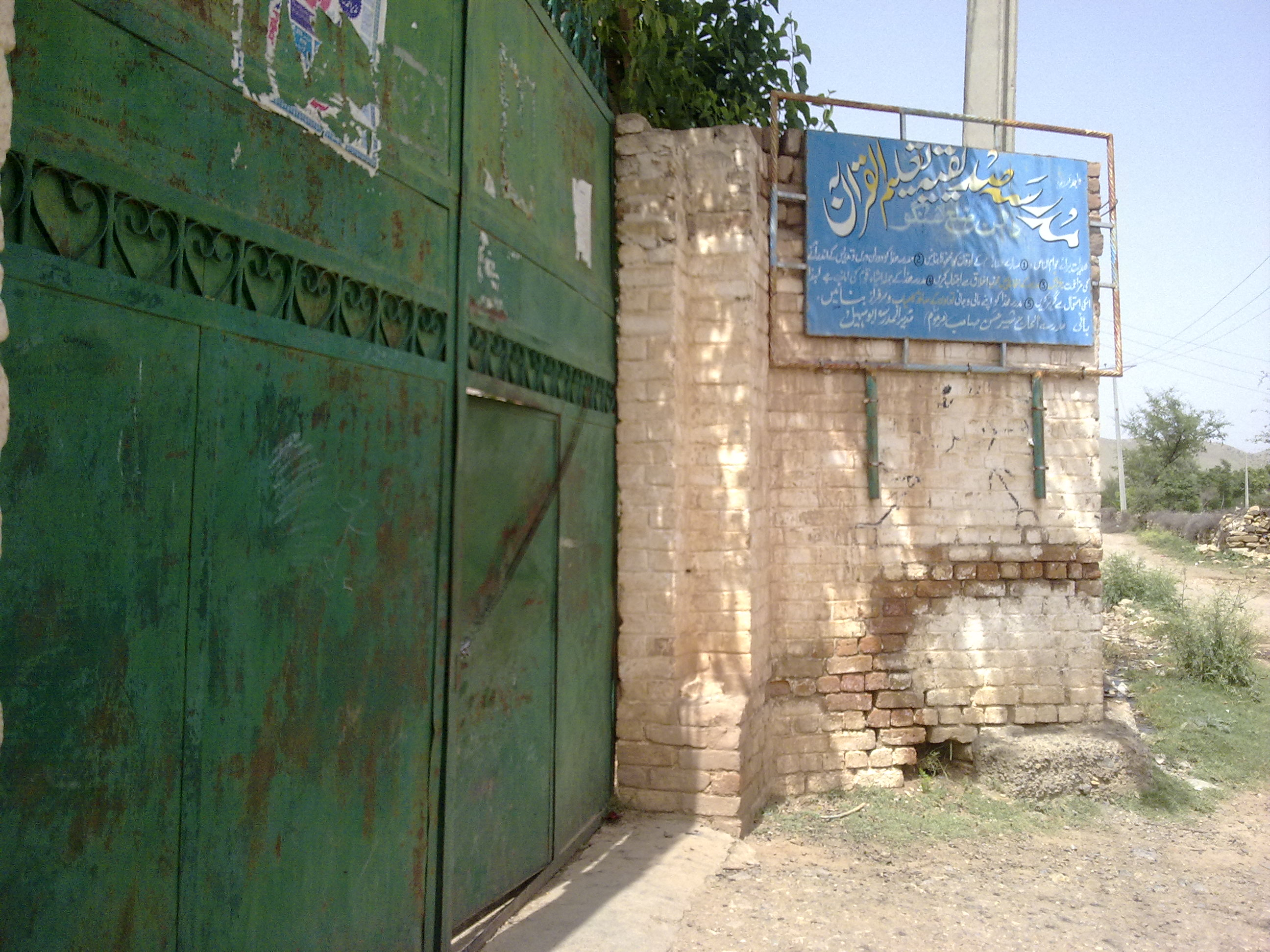
Picture of the entrance of a typical Madrasa in rural Pakistan. It is very similar to the one Wasim went to when he was sent to his aunt in Pakistan by his father.

As an adult Wasim has transformed into a tough gangster and is now a grandiose heroin dealer. Wasim and the gang is importing their own heroin to Norway from Pakistan. This import business creates many new enemies to the East Side Crew. It is discovered that Wasim's friend Riaz has snitched on Khalid and gone on the run, the two remaining friends of the gang Wasim and Munawar must join the manhunt for their beloved childhood friend Riaz. The manhunt puts Wasim in a conflicting position, he does not know where he should put his loyalty, his friend Riaz or the gang, East Side Crew. The manhunt sets up a string of brutal events and eventually Wasim tries to think of a plan where he can get the ultimate revenge without getting himself killed or caught by the authorities.

== Production ==
The film had a budget of around 20,263,733 Norwegian krone NOK of which 16,910,233 was, used on the film's production. The remaining 3,353,500, was used on print and advertisement including, the film distribution. The Norwegian Film Fund granted about 45% of the money for the production and 35% for print and advertisement. Another 10% of the production and 5% of the print and advertisement cost were sponsored by the Nordic Film and TV fund.

== Cast ==
The cast of Izzat includes an international cast with Norwegian, Norwegian Pakistanis, British and Swedish actors present in the film.

- Emil Marwa as Wasim
- Khawar Gomi Sadiq as Munawar
- Assad Siddique as Riaz
- Daud Mirza as Saddiq
- Jan Sælid as Kula (The bullet)
- Harald Lönnbro as Svensken (the Swede)
- Leon Bashir as Hamza
- Bente Wethal as Robina
- Sudhir Kumar Kohli as Pappa Mohammed (Dad Mohammed)
- Abubakar Hussain as Amiir
- Bibi Razia as Mamma Khaldia (Mother)
- Habib Ur-Rahman as Manzoor Wasim som liten (young Wasim)
- M. Rehman Ahmed as Riaz som liten (young Riaz)
- Nohman Janjua as Munawar som liten (young Munawar)
- Elyas Mohammed as Khalid
- Amir Malik as Farooq
- Ove Andreassen as Grisen (The Pig)
- Danish Khan as Sajjad
- Shaheen Khan as Rashid
- Hege Marie Aanby as Svenskens dame 1 (The Swede's lady 1)
- Hege Merete Wangsmo as Svenskens dame 2 (The Swede's lady 2)
- Rolf Isaksen as Harry Doptester
- Ingrid Maria Holth as Wasims Kjæreste (Wasim's girlfriend)
- Isabel Algard Tysnes as Riaz' kjæreste (Riaz's girlfriend)
- Marte G. Christensen as jenta i hytta (girl in the cabin)
- Finn Schau as Butikkekspeditør (Shop forwarder)
- Nasrullah Qureshi as Babar
- Henrik Rafaelsen as Lærer (teacher)
- Marit Hamdahl as Rektor (Principle)
- Josefine Reiermark as jente i klasserom (girl in classroom)
- Asia Begum as Mamma Shamina (Mother Shamina)
- Zakir Hussain as Aslam
- Yrsa Ulriksdottir as Robina som liten (young Robina)
- Fahran Mahmood Butt as Amiir som liten (young Amiir)
- Ayaz Hussain as Omar
- Ruhallah Shan Quershi as Imran
- Mehran Iqbal as Barkat
- Lars Berteig Andersen as norsk gutt (Norwegian boy)
- Jenny Cecilie Grahm as norsk jente (Norwegian girl)
- Gunnar Lien Holsten as Politimann (police man)
- Ina Ringstad as Line
- Anderz Eide as Toller
- Zahid Ali as Elvis
- Jennifer Bråthen as Kulas kjæreste (Kula's girlsfriend)
- Chris Bisson as mann i telefonkiosk (man in the phone booth)
- Maryon Sylte as jente på disko 1 (girl on disco 1)
- Ina Bye-Hansen as jente på disko 2 (girl on disco 2)
- Rebekka Karijord as Elin
- Khalid But as Lege (doctor)
- Tasneem Kosar as tante (aunt)
- Malik Imran as gutt på motorsykkel (boy on motorcycle)
- Benazir Awan as lærer i Pakistan (teacher in Pakistan)
- Yngvild Støen Grotmol as Renate
- Remi Jakobsen as Bad guy, bodyguard
- Kai Kolstad Rødseth as Drive by shooter

== Soundtrack ==
The soundtrack of Izzat comprises 17 different song tracks, although Izzat is a gangster film with Pakistani youths as the main protagonists the film uses Rock, Hard rock, Pop rock, Alternative rock, Punk rock and Hardcore punk in most of its tracks in the music of the film. The music in the soundtrack all comes from known Norwegian rock bands with songs that are made from the late 70s to the 80s, 90s and early 2000s. The bands that are included in the soundtrack are Amulet, Anal Babes, Backstreet Girls, Bonk, Brut Boogaloo, Cato Salsa Experience, DumDum Boys, Gluecifer, Jokke med Tourettes, Kung Fu Girls, Madrugada, Raga Rockers, Ricochets and So Much Hate. The most known bands are Glucifer and Raga Rockers and with Glucifer having two song on the Izzat soundtrack.

The soundtrack of Izzat was also made into a separate album which was released in September 2005 by Columbia Records which is owned by Sony. The soundtrack is sold as a CD or for digital download.

No.	Title	Writer(s)	Length
1.	"Desolate city"	Gluecifer	3:34
2.	"Strike One"	Brut Boogaloo	3:02
3.	"Walking Downtown"	Backstreet Girls	3:38
4.	"Når knoklene blir til gele"	Raga Rockers	2:36
5.	"Carefree"	We	3:47
6.	"A Little Bit of More"	Ricochets	3:56
7.	"Majesty"	Madrugada	4:19
8.	"Clean Deal"	Kjøtt	2:04
9.	"Waiting in the Car"	Bonk	2:08
10.	"Automatic Thrill"	Gluecifer	3:25
11.	"Vinnie"	Kung Fu Girls	3:04
12.	"Crash into My Room"	Amulet	3:41
13.	"Keep on Running"	Cato Salsa Experience	3:38
14.	"Halv"	Jokke med Tourettes	4:15
15.	"blind"	DumDum Boys	3:34
16.	"A Day at the Station"	So Much Hate	3:19
17.	"No Limit"	Anal Babes	3:09
Total length:			57:09

== Release ==
=== Theatrical ===
The movie had its domestic premiere in Norway on 7 October 2005 and was one of the first films in the immigrant made and non-children movies category to be a box office success in the theatrical release in Norway. The film also got ranked 24th of the best grossing films in Norway in the year 2005. Izzat managed to gather 129 774 ticket sales for its theatrical release in Norway in the year 2005 and an additional 1442 tickets in 2006 with an additional screening in 2009 gathering 104 ticket sales, 2.9% of the Norwegian population saw the film during the theatrical release of it in 2005. Izzat was only commercially released theatrically in Norway and did not see any theatrical release within the EU.

=== Home media ===
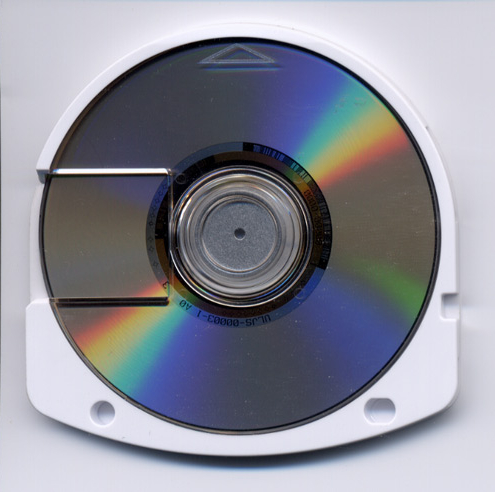
A picture of a UMD one media which Izzat was released on.

Izzat was released on DVD and Universal Media Disc after its theatrical screening. Izzat was also available for streaming on NRK nett TV and is currently available for streaming on Netflix in Norway, Sweden, Denmark, and Finland. The film is purchasable and rentable through the steaming services of Google Play Movies, Apple TV and Microsoft Movies and TV.

== Reception ==
Izzat is considered part of the Norwegian diasporic cinema scene and has been compared to the American action film Goodfellas. The film is significant in that it was the first major commercially successful diaspora film in Norway. The film is also considered a forefront runner for diasporic cinema in Norway as it is the fifth diaspora film made in Norway. Izzat was the first ever Norwegian film to be subtitled into Urdu in hopes to reach a double audience, with a visioned release in Pakistan in addition to the release in Norway. The film did not gather any significant reception in Pakistan and Izzat remained mostly a success within Norway.

Izzat was well received by the general public, not because of the ethnic theming of the movie, but rather for its engaging action and thriller suspense. The film was also met with some criticism from the public with the main criticism being that the film did not provide as satisfactory and slick action as a typical Hollywood film of the same genre which Norwegians had grown accustomed to. Izzat also received critical reception as being a successful movie made by immigrants. The movie was praised for its theming and handling of social issues in Norway regarding non-western and Islamic immigrants growing up in Norway. The film has a current score of 74% on Rotten Tomatoes.

Izzat is considered part of the new wave cinema that emerged in Norway after 2001 when the Norwegian government created a new national film policy. The policy was to remove municipality film funding and create a single state sponsored film agency from a decision made by the Norwegian Minister of Culture. The motivation was to get more Norwegians to go see Norwegian made films rather than making Norwegian films for a single elite cinemagoers group. Norwegian films constituted 5–10% of market shares in the cinema industry in Norway, while the rest was made from Hollywood films. The new system was modelled after the successful Danish model and it was created to have Norwegian film makers take advantage of the established genres from Hollywood. Izzat was the most successful movie that came out of this new model national film policy during its time.

== Awards ==
Izzat was nominated for five nominations after its release in the 2006 Amanda Award (Amandaprisen), which is held annually at the Norwegian international film festival in Haugesund. The movie got nominated for:

- Årets mannlige skuespiller (Best Actor) – Emil Marwa
- Årets barne og ungdomsfilm (Best Youth Film) – Ulrik Imtiaz Rolfsen
- Årets norkse kinofilm (Best Film) – John M. Jacobsen and Sveinung Golimo
- Årets filmmanuskript (Best Screenplay) – Leon Bashir and Ulrik Imtaiz Rolfsen
- Best Debut – Ulrik Imtiaz Rolfsen

The film did receive two Kanonprisen awards (the canon prize) from Kosmorama the international film festival held annually in Trondheim in 2006. The film was nominated and awarded:

- Best supporting actor – Jan Sælid
- People's Choice award

== Sequel ==
Izzat received a sequel in 2014 with the film Haram, also made by Ulrik Imtaiz Rolfsen. The film takes place in the same canonical universe as Izzat being about a young Pakistani boy growing up in Oslo, although Haram is not a direct sequel and the story follows a new protagonist Omar played by Elias Ali. There are some recurring characters from Izzat appearing in Haram.
