= Athar Ali (politician) =

Pakistani Norwegian

Athar Ali (born 5 March 1961 in Panjan Kasana, Gujrat) is a Pakistani Norwegian who has represented the Norwegian political party Red.

He served as a deputy representative to the Norwegian Parliament from Oslo during the term 1993–1997. He was the first non-Western immigrant to meet as a parliamentary representative; the first to get elected as a regular representative was Afshan Rafiq.

Ali was a member of Oslo municipality council from 1987 to 1995 and 1999 to 2003. He is founder and head of the Norwegian Immigrants Forum. Ali is a graduate in social work. He works as a clinical social worker.
