= Leon Bashir =

Norwegian actor, screenwriter and film director

- Born: 13 February 1979 (age 47); Oslo, Norway
- Occupations: Actor, screenwriter and film director
- Years active: 1997–present

Leon Israr Bashir is a Norwegian actor, screenwriter and film director.

== Career ==
He was born in Oslo to Pakistani parents. Bashir started his acting career on 1997. As an actor, Bashir is best known for the films Izzat, Tomme Tønner and the TV series Codename Hunter. He has also appeared in the TV series Familiesagaen De syv søstre, Fox Grønland and Schpaaa. As a screenwriter, he has written screenplays for the films Izzat and Tomme Tønner. He was nominated for Best Actor award at Amanda Award for his role in Gjengangere.

== Filmography ==
=== Actor ===
- Gjengangere (2017)
- Tomme Tønner 2 – Det brune gullet (2011)
- Kodenavn Hunter (2007)
- Tomme Tønner (2010)
- Izzat (2005)
- Fox Grønland (2001)
- Schpaaa (1998)
- Familiesagaen De syv søstre (1997–2000)

=== Screenwriter ===
- Gjengangere (2017)
- Tomme Tønner 2 – Det brune gullet (2011)
- Tomme Tønner (2010)
- Izzat (2005)

=== Director ===
- Gjengangere (2017)
- Tomme Tønner (2010)
