= Afshan Rafiq =

Norwegian politician

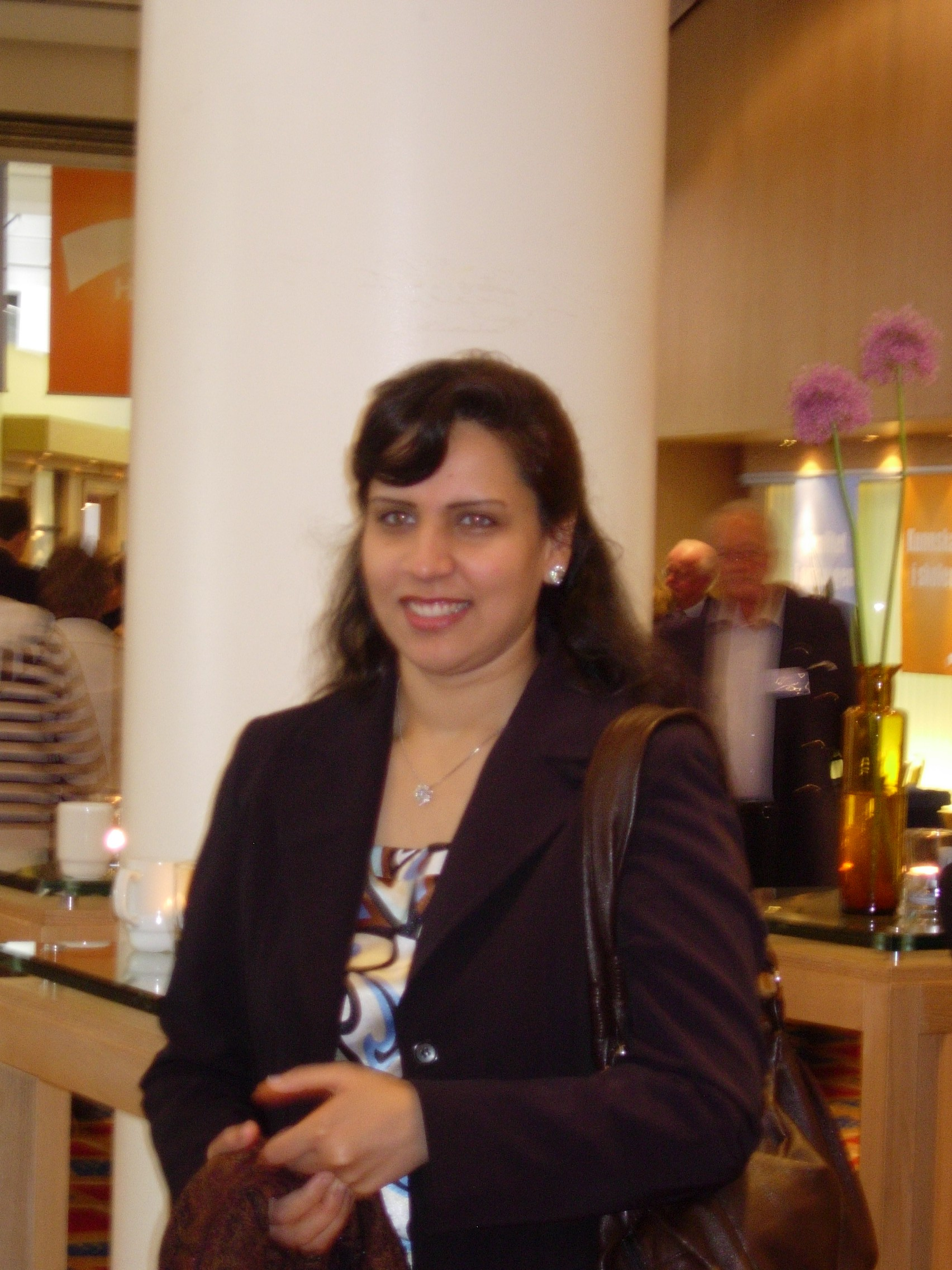
Afshan Rafiq in 2007

Afshan Rafiq (born 25 February 1975) is a Pakistani Norwegian politician for the Conservative Party.

Born in Oslo to Pakistani immigrants, she graduated from the University of Oslo in 1999 with the cand.mag. degree. In 2000 she enrolled in medicine studies.

She became involved in the Young Conservatives as a teenager, and served as a member of Oslo city council from 1995 to 2001. In 2001 she was elected to the Norwegian Parliament from Oslo, as the first person of non-Western background elected to the Norwegian Parliament. Pakistan-born Athar Ali had served earlier, but as a deputy representative. Rafiq was not re-elected in 2005. Instead, she served in the position of deputy representative during the term 2005–2009.

Rafiq resides at Høybråten, and is married to fellow politician Aamir J. Sheikh, with whom she has one daughter. Sheikh had originally gone through an arranged marriage, but this was annulled in 2003, and married Rafiq one year later. Rafiq has also spoken out against the caste system.
