= Shahbaz Tariq =

Norwegian politician

Shahbaz Tariq (born 24 December 1948 in Pakistan) is a Norwegian politician for the Labour Party. He was born in Pakistan on 24 December 1948 however his family moved to Oslo in 1950 when he was two years old.

He served as a deputy representative to the Norwegian Parliament from Oslo during the terms 1989–1993, 1993–1997, 1997–2001 and 2001–2005. From 2000 to 2001 he was a regular representative, covering for Bjørn Tore Godal who was appointed to the first cabinet Stoltenberg.

Tariq was a member of Oslo city council from 1991 to 2003.

== See also ==
- Norwegians of Pakistani descent
