= Islam Net =

Religious organisation based in Norway

- Formation: 2008; 18 years ago
- Founder: Fahad Qureshi
- Type: Nonprofit corporation
- Legal status: Active
- Purpose: Religious Organisation
- Official language: Norwegian, English
- Main organ: islamnet.no
- Website: www.islamnet.no

Islam Net is an Islamic organisation in Norway, founded by Pakistani-Norwegian engineering student Fahad Qureshi in 2008. It has local chapters in Oslo, Akershus, Tromsø and Bodø, and is initiating a fifth in Trondheim. By 2011, the organisation had more than 1,400 paying members, centred on students.

== Activities ==
In 2010, Islam Net set out a "missionary expedition" to Nordkapp, Finnmarksvidda and Hammerfest, in order to "spread the message of the prophet Muhammad" and solve misunderstandings about Islam. Several Norwegians have converted to Islam at their meetings, and it runs a school in Oslo for new converts to Islam.

Islam Net has received support for this position by the Muslim Student Society (Muslimsk Studentsamfunn) and Young Muslim (Ung Muslim). In 2010, the Oslo University College denied Islam Net free use of its rooms due to their position on hosting such meetings, but they have gotten the permission back as they have held events there afterward.

"Islam Net Student" has not been allowed to register as a student association at the University of Oslo due to its gender segregated practices and attitudes towards others' religious beliefs and sexual orientation.

On January 8, 2015, after the massacre of the Charlie Hebdo magazine in France, Qureshi, after condemning the attacks, tore apart a drawing from the magazine, stating that while Muslims do condemn the attacks, the magazine had abused freedom of speech to engage in the bullying and harassment of Muslims by mocking Muhammad and depicting Muslims and particularly Arab Muslims in a racist manner.

== See also ==
Ugbad and Rahma Sadiq
