= Andreas Motzfeldt Kravik =

Norwegian jurist and politician

State Secretary for Minister of Foreign Affairs
- Incumbent
- Assumed office 16 October 2023
- Monarchs: Harald V (2023–2026); Haakon VIII (August 2026–present)
- Prime Minister: Jonas Gahr Støre

Personal details
- Born: 1979 (age 46–47)
- Party: Labour Party
- Education: University of Oslo Faculty of Law (Master of Laws; 2008)
- Occupation: Politician, lawyer

Andreas Motzfeldt Kravik is a Norwegian lawyer and politician. He has been a State Secretary to the foreign minister of Norway since 2023 and is a member of the Norwegian Labour Party.

== Early life and family ==
Kravik spent his early childhood in California, where his father was employed by NASA. They moved to Østensjø, a borough in Oslo, when he started school. Kravik takes his middle name Motzfeldt from his mother's side of the family. His grandfather, Peter Michael Motzfeldt, was a diplomat who had served as Norway's ambassador.

== Education ==
Kravik holds a master's degree in law from the University of Oslo.

== Career ==
Kravik served as an associate judge at the Drammen District Court from 2008 to 2010. He then became an adviser at the Ministry of Defence (2010 to 2012) and later at the Ministry of Foreign Affairs (2012 to 2014). He was a board member of the Labour Party's International Forum from 2013 to 2014. He was appointed a secretary at the Norwegian mission to the UN in 2014, serving until 2018. Prior to becoming a State Secretary (Note: Also referred to as the deputy foreign minister of Norway. See, for example, "Statement on the visit of Norway's Deputy Minister of Foreign Affairs to Juba from 4th to 5th March". norway.no. Juba. 2026-03-06. "Norwegian Deputy Foreign Minister Andreas Kravik just concluded a two-day visit to Juba."; "Andreas Kravik". ecfr.eu. "Andreas Motzfeldt Kravik has been Norway's Deputy Foreign Minister since August 2023 and is a member of the Norwegian Labour Party."; "Deputy Prime Minister/Foreign Minister Senator Mohammad Ishaq Dar today received the Deputy Foreign Minister of Norway, H.E. Mr. Andreas Motzfeldt Kravik, ..." mofa.gov.pk.) to Norway's foreign minister on 16 October 2023, he served in the ministry's legal department, first as a deputy director (2018 to 2021) and then as a department director (2021 to 2023).

Kravik has co-authored the book Folkerettslig metode (lit. 'Methodology of International Law').

=== 2026 Iran war ===
During the 2026 Iran war, Kravik expressed support for Pakistan's diplomatic efforts towards resolving the conflict in a meeting with Pakistani foreign minister Ishaq Dar in Islamabad.

== See also ==
- Espen Barth Eide
- Social democracy in Norway

== Bibliography ==
- Andreas Motzfeldt Kravik (2023). Folkerettslig metode. Universitetsforlaget. ISBN 9788215055695.
- Jan G. Langfeldt (2003). Mønnich-slekten. ISBN 82-994591-1-7.
