= Akhtar Chaudhry =

Pakistani-Norwegian politician

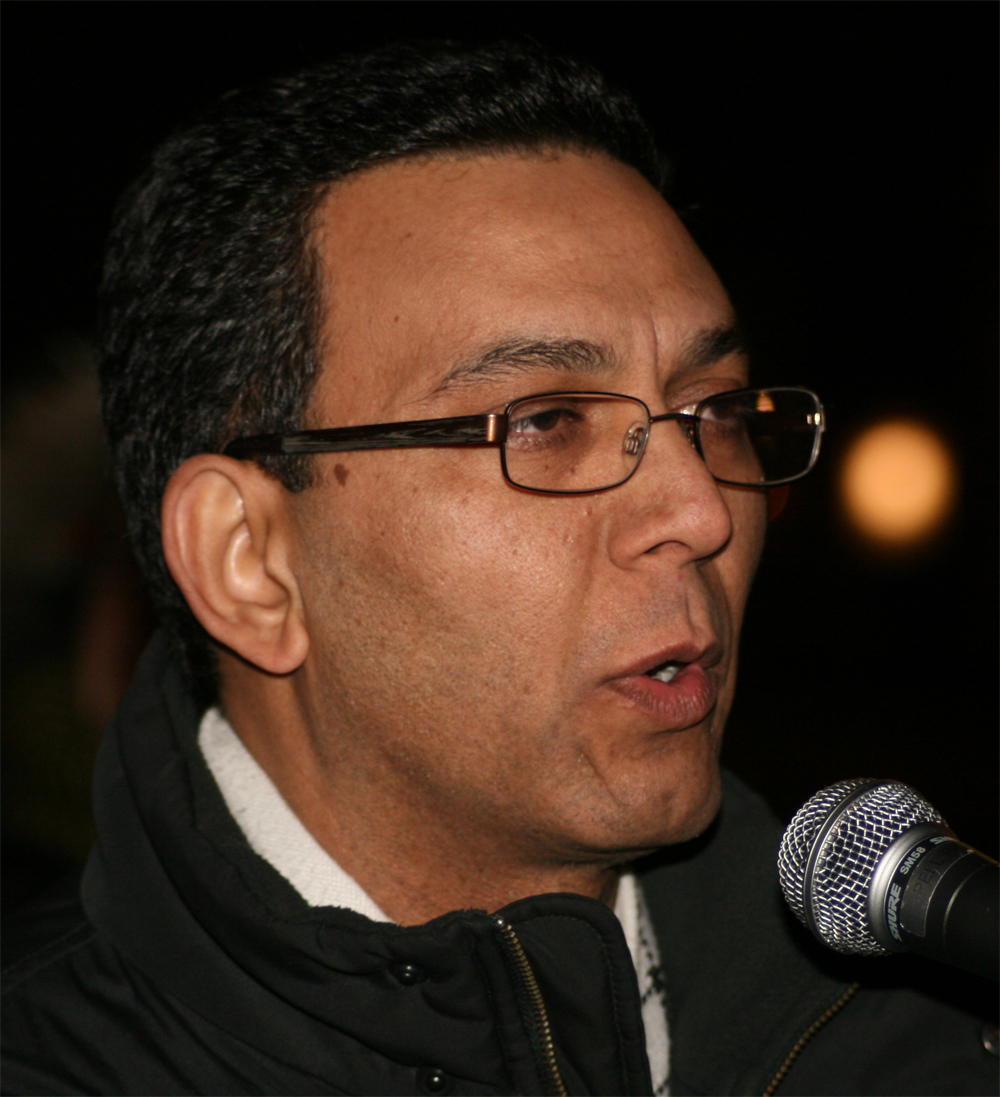

Fourth Vice President of the Storting
- In office 8 October 2009 – 30 September 2013
- President: Dag Terje Andersen
- Preceded by: Position established
- Succeeded by: Ingjerd Schou

Member of Parliament for Oslo
- In office 1 October 2001 – 30 September 2013

Personal details
- Born: Haque Nawaz Akhtar Chaudhry; 23 July 1961 (age 64) Lahore, Pakistan
- Party: Socialist Left Party
- Occupation: Politician

Haque Nawaz Akhtar Chaudhry (born 23 July 1961) is a Pakistani-Norwegian politician for the Socialist Left Party and 4th Vice President (deputy speaker) of the Norwegian parliament from 2009 to 2013. He came to Norway from Pakistan in 1982.

Chaudhry served in the position of deputy representative to the Norwegian Parliament from Oslo during the terms 2001–2005 and 2005–2009. Halfway into the latter term, in 2007, he moved up as a regular representative as Heidi Sørensen (who in turn filled in for Kristin Halvorsen) was appointed State Secretary. He has been a member of Parliament since then. When Sørensen returned to Parliament in 2012, Heikki Holmås joined the cabinet, so from then Chaudry replaced him in Parliament.

On 4 December 2012, Chaudry lost a nomination election in Oslo SV for the top spot on the party's ballot in the Norwegian parliamentary election of 2013. He was not interested in spots further down the ballot and was not reelected to the parliament in 2013.
