= Baitun Nasr Mosque =

Ahmadi muslim mosque in Oslo, Norway

- Baitun Nasr moské
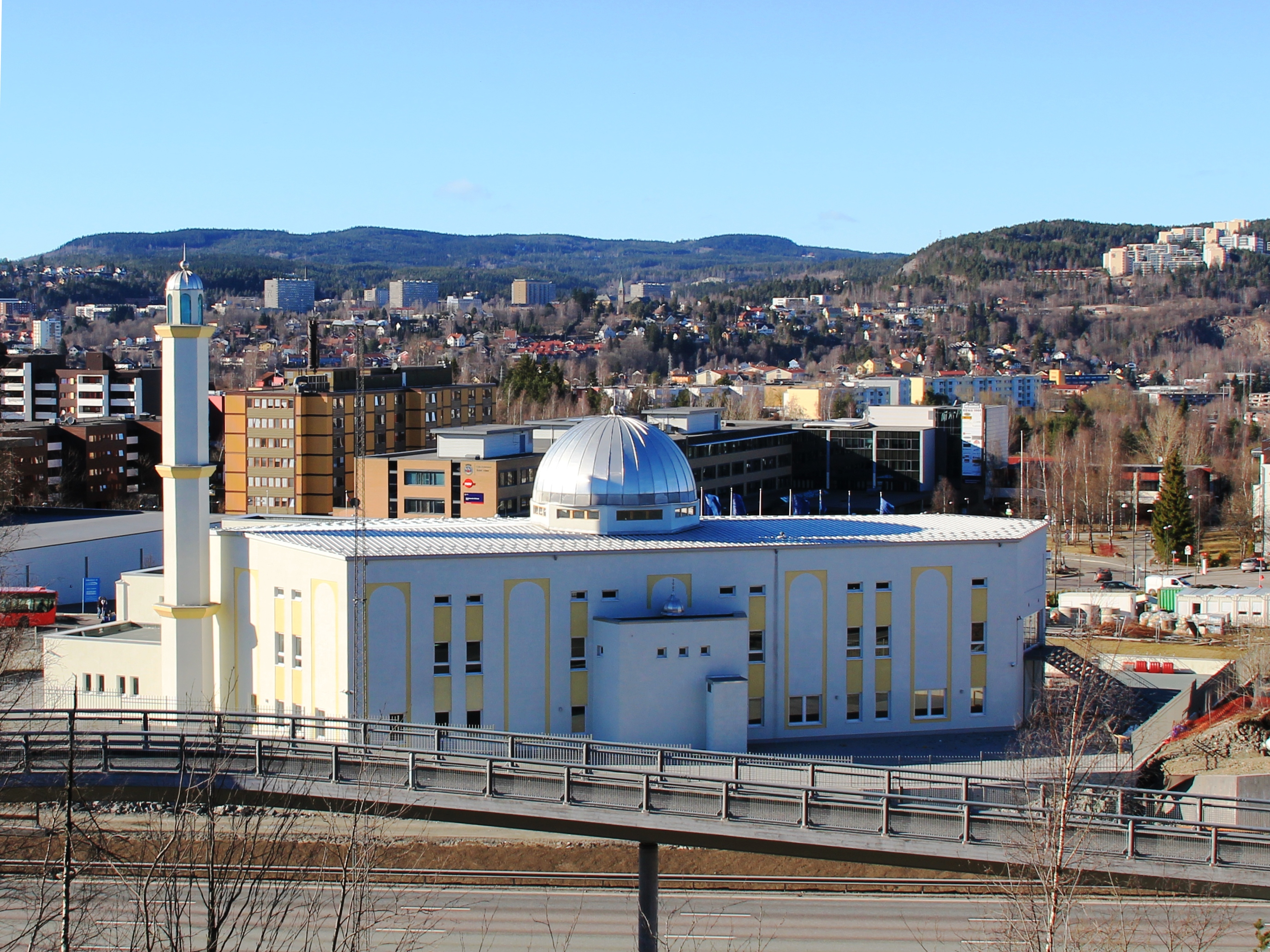

- Location within Norway

Religion
- Affiliation: Islam
- Branch/tradition: Ahmadiyya

Location
- Municipality: Oslo
- Country: Norway
- Interactive map of Baitun Nasr Mosque
- Coordinates: 59.939607°N 10.898258°E

Architecture
- Type: mosque
- Completed: 2011
- Construction cost: 100 million kr

Specifications
- Capacity: 2,250 worshippers
- Dome: 1
- Dome height (outer): 5 m
- Minaret: 1

Baitun Nasr Mosque (Norwegian: Baitun Nasr moské), also known as the Furuset Mosque (Norwegian: Furuset moské), is an Ahmadi Muslim mosque in Furuset in the borough of Alna, northeast of Oslo, Norway. It is the largest mosque in the country. The complex is located near E6, the country's main north–south highway.

== History ==
The mosque was opened on 30 September 2011.

== Architecture ==
The mosque is the largest one in Norway. It can accommodate up to 2,250 worshippers. The mosque has one dome and one minaret. The dome stands at a height of five meters. The mosque complex consists of library, offices and kitchen.
