= Norwegians with Pakistani background =

Norwegians of Pakistani descent

Pakistani Norwegian
Total population
- 39,257 (2019 Official Norway estimate) 0.7% of the Norwegian population

Regions with significant populations
- Oslo

Languages
- Norwegian, English, Urdu, Punjabi, Pashto, Saraiki, Sindhi, Balochi,

Religion
- Islam (mostly Sunni and Ahmadiyya) Christianity Irreligion

Related ethnic groups
- Overseas Pakistani, Pakistani diaspora

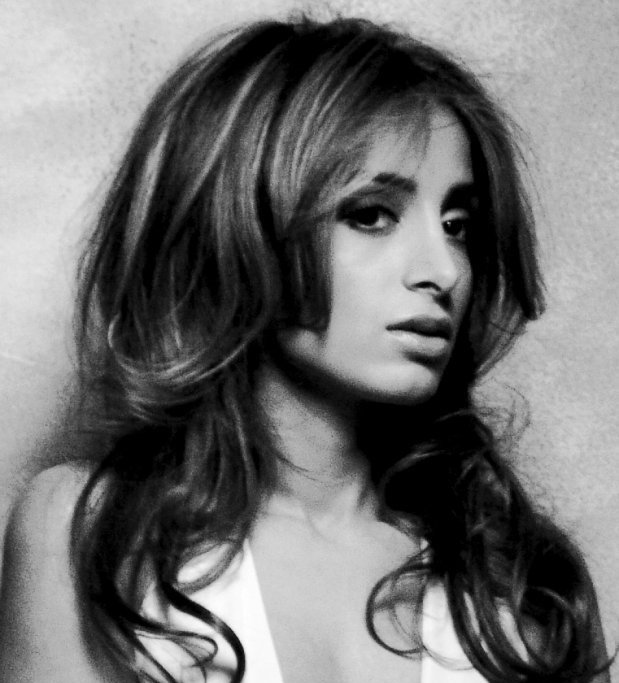
Deeyah Khan

Pakistani Norwegians are Norwegians of Pakistani descent, 65.23% of Pakistanis in Norway live in the capital Oslo. First-generation Pakistani Norwegians, who migrate from Pakistan, are distinguished from the mainstream in several demographic aspects, while second-generation Pakistani Norwegians, who are born in Norway, are well established in Norway and have gone on to become professionals and politicians.

Almost 70% of the Pakistanis in Norway are originally from Kharian, Punjab. The city is often nicknamed as Little Norway.

== History in Norway ==
The initial first-generation Pakistani Norwegians arrived in Norway as guest workers during the 1970s, under Norway's then-liberal immigration scheme which allowed for unskilled "guest workers" to temporarily settle in Norway. Most of these immigrants were young men that came from areas surrounding the town of Kharian, in Pakistan's Punjab province, though later waves included a high number of workers from Lahore, Pakistan's second-largest city. The law was later amended to allow for already arrived guest workers to permanently settle in Norway. Following stricter immigration laws passed in 1976, Pakistan immigration to Norway shifted from the arrival of new immigrants, to family reunifications, in which Pakistani Norwegians could apply for their close relatives and/or spouses to immigrate to Norway.

== Employment ==
Almost 60% of Pakistani Norwegian women born in Norway are employed.

On the other hand, 35.2% of Pakistani immigrant women in Norway are employed. Counting full employment at 30 hours of work per week, 20% of Pakistani immigrant women in Norway were in full-time employment and 8% worked 1 – 19 hours per week.

By excluding part-time employment the statistics also showed that in 2017, males born in Norway with Pakistani heritage aged 30–39 had 16 percentage points lower employment compared to Norwegians.

A study from 2012 revealed a high degree of discrimination against job seekers of Pakistani background: jobseekers with Pakistani names are 25% less likely to get a job interview than jobseekers with Norwegian names - the qualifications of the Norwegian jobseekers and jobseekers of Pakistani heritage, and the job application letters, being identical.

== Crime ==
According to Statistics Norway, in the 2010-2013 period, the proportion of Pakistani-born perpetrators of criminal offences aged 15 and older in Norway was 69.3 per 1000 residents. When corrected for variables such as age and gender as well as employment, the total decreased to 63.6 after age and gender adjustment. This is higher compared to the averages of 44.9 among native Norwegians. Compared to other migration groups from Asia, Pakistanis had a lower proportion of perpetrators of criminal offences then migrants from Afghanistan (127.6 and 93.2 after age and gender adjustment) and migrants from Turkey (87.0 and 74.4 after age and gender adjustment). But it was higher than migrants from India (37.2 and 31.3 after age and gender adjustment) and migrants from Thailand (39.9 and 46.9 after age and gender adjustment).

== Lifestyle and integrating into Norwegian society ==
Children of Pakistani immigrants sometimes struggle when trying to be loyal to both their family's traditional Islamic culture and the one of liberal Scandinavia. Second generation Pakistani Norwegians are sometimes told that they are different from Norwegians, although they feel at home only in Norway, while at home they may also be pressured by their parents to not become "too Norwegian".

Riffat Bashir, Imam of Oslo's largest mosque often invites Norwegian church leaders and non-Muslim citizens to his mosque in order to partake in inter-faith and inter-ethnic dialogue.

Family-related chain migration marriage has been common among Pakistani Norwegians, but has become less common since the year 2000. A decreasing number of second generation Pakistani Norwegians, i.e. Pakistani Norwegians born in Norway, obtain spouses from abroad: In 2010, 81 persons migrated to Norway by marrying a second-generation Pakistani Norwegian. The number of unmarried second-generation Pakistani Norwegians above 17 years increased "from 1 100 in 1998 to 3 700 in 2010". The same trend is seen in the age group 18 to 23 years. In 2012, 24 Pakistanis migrated to Norway by marrying a second-generation Pakistani Norwegian aged 18–23. During the same period, the number of unmarried second-generation Pakistani Norwegians in the same age group increased "from 1,000 in 1998 to 2,700 in 2012".

In 2014, 11 Pakistani spouses migrated to Norway by marrying a second-generation Pakistani Norwegians, aged 18–23. And in 2015, only 3 Pakistani spouses migrated to Norway in connection with marrying a second-generation Pakistani Norwegians, from the age group 18–23 years.

Also fewer and fewer first-generation Pakistani Norwegians, ie Pakistani immigrants in Norway, obtain spouses from abroad. In 2012, 10 Pakistani immigrants in Norway, aged 18–23, married spouses from Pakistan, even though "the number of unmarried immigrants from Pakistan residing in Norway has increased somewhat" in the period 1998 to 2012.

Among young second-generation Pakistani Norwegians, it is now "almost as unusual to be married at the beginning of their twenties" as "it is generally among young people in Norway." This development can be explained by the fact that Pakistani Norwegians today have more potential marriage partners to choose among in Norway, and with the increasing participation of Pakistani Norwegians in higher education.

Second-generation Pakistani-Norwegian women give in average birth to 1,95 children each, the same average as Norwegian women in general.

According to statistics from 2009 Pakistani Norwegians generally had a spouse of Pakistani ancestry. The percentage of males marrying outside their ethnic group was slightly higher than among the females. However, more than 1000 children were registered in 2008 to have one Pakistani parent and one with Norwegian background. Thus, there must be more couples of mixed ethnicity having children than the number of marriages indicates.

Partners having the same religious faith is important to 83% of Pakistani migrants in Norway and 77% of the second generation.

An increasing number prefer travelling to Pakistan by changing onto a direct UK carrier at Manchester Airport.

== Politics ==
The Pakistani Norwegian community does not vote as a bloc for any particular party in Norway. Rather, there is a diversity of political beliefs, demonstrated by support for a variety of parties. Many Pakistani Norwegian politicians have been successful in their political campaigns. Hadia Tajik who was born in Norway to Pakistani parents became Minister of Culture and Equality in 2012. She is elected to the parliament from Oslo and is (2018) vice-chair of the Labour Party. Akhtar Chaudhry was until 2013 Member of Parliament and vice-president of the Parliament representing the Socialist Left Party. He migrated to Norway from Pakistan in 1982 and was the former head of the Pakistan Norwegian Welfare Organization.

Afshan Rafiq is a former member of Stortinget for the Conservative Party. She is still (2018) a deputy MP, representing the Oslo electoral district. Abid Raja is a Member of Parliament representing the Liberal Party from the Akershus electoral district.

Many Pakistani Norwegians are also involved in lower-level political life as members of regional councils and city councils. They have been particularly well represented in the Oslo city council, where they made up 10% of council members from 2003 to 2007. Aslam Ahsan served Lørenskog municipal council in 1983 to 2019, 36 years. He was in 2009 awarded the HM The Kings medal of Marit in Gold.

== Media & Entertainment ==
Deeyah Khan is the first mainstream recording artist of Pakistani heritage in Norway and is the first and only female World music producer of Norwegian Pakistani descent. Since 2006/07, she completely stopped performing as an artist, instead turning her focus to producing and composing music. Deeyah has produced Listen To The Banned, an internationally acclaimed album, followed by Nordic Woman. Deeyah is also known for her outspoken activism for women's rights, peace, and freedom of expression. She has directed and produced multiple award winning documentary films including Emmy and Bafta awards for films including about honour killings named Banaz a Love Story. The film received an Emmy Award, a Peabody Award and a Best Norwegian Documentary award at the Bergen International Film Festival. Deeyah has been awarded the 2012 Ossietzky prize which is Norwegian PEN's prize for outstanding achievements within the field of freedom of expression In 2016 Khan became the inaugural UNESCO Goodwill Ambassador for Artistic Freedom and Creativity.

Adil Khan is a theatre and screen actor in Norway. He has played the lead role in a range of Norwegian productions from the hit series Taxi to The Jungle Book, West Side Story to @lice. He is also the judge on Norske Talenter.

Attia Bano Qamar is the first girl from Oslo, Norway to represent Pakistan in the Miss Pakistan World pageant and went on to represent Pakistan in international pageants, Miss Globe and Queen of the World.

Mah-Rukh Ali is the first news anchor of foreign descent working for Norway's state broadcasting network, the NRK - although another Pakistani Norwegian, Noman Mubashir, is the first personality of foreign descent on Norwegian TV and hosted the multi-ethnic programme, Migrapolis, before hosting a Saturday night entertainment show. Zahid Ali, another Pakistani Norwegian, joined the ranks of minorities on Norwegian television by participating in the comedy program Rikets Røst on TV2.

Ulrik Imtiaz Rolfsen is a Pakistani Norwegian who directed three movies, including Izzat, a story which follows Wasim and his youth gang years in the 1980s to his young adult years in the 1990s. The film is set in Oslo and deals with the double standards in a tough Pakistani Norwegian gang environment. It relates directly to the difficulty of being raised as a Muslim immigrant in western countries. The word Izzat means honour in Urdu. A number of Pakistani Norwegians were featured in this film, and a small portion was filmed in Lahore, Pakistan.

== Education ==
Almost 10% of the medical students in Oslo are of Pakistani heritage. The figure is significant as Pakistani Norwegians only constitute 3.67% of Oslo's population. The proportion of Pakistani Norwegians, born and raised in Norway, in higher education at university level is higher than the Norwegian national average. Amongst Pakistani Norwegians born and raised in Pakistan the share is 17%, the same as the average for immigrants to Norway in general.

Higher social pressure within the Pakistani Norwegian community pushes children into prestigious professions. Professions popular among Pakistani Norwegians have been dubbed collectively as ALI-professions, with ALI being an acronym for the Norwegian words for lawyer, doctor and engineer. There is supposedly a noticeable slow shift where Pakistani Norwegians children are making educational choices regarded as less prestigious among Pakistanis.

Around 72.4% of second-generation Pakistanis living in Norway are college-educated, almost at par with the statistics for overall Norwegians, reveals a survey conducted by the Ministry of Education of Norway.

Internationally renowned researchers are, among others, Farrukh Abbas Chaudhry (medicine) and Shah Nawaz (petroleum chemistry), and the physicist Kalbe Razi Naqvi.

== See also ==
- Demographics of Norway
- Immigration to Norway
- Islam in Norway
- Ahmadiyya in Norway
- Norway-Pakistan relations
- Overseas Pakistani
- Pakistanis in Denmark
- Pakistanis in Finland
- Pakistanis in Sweden
