= Islamic Council Norway =

Organization for Muslims in Norway

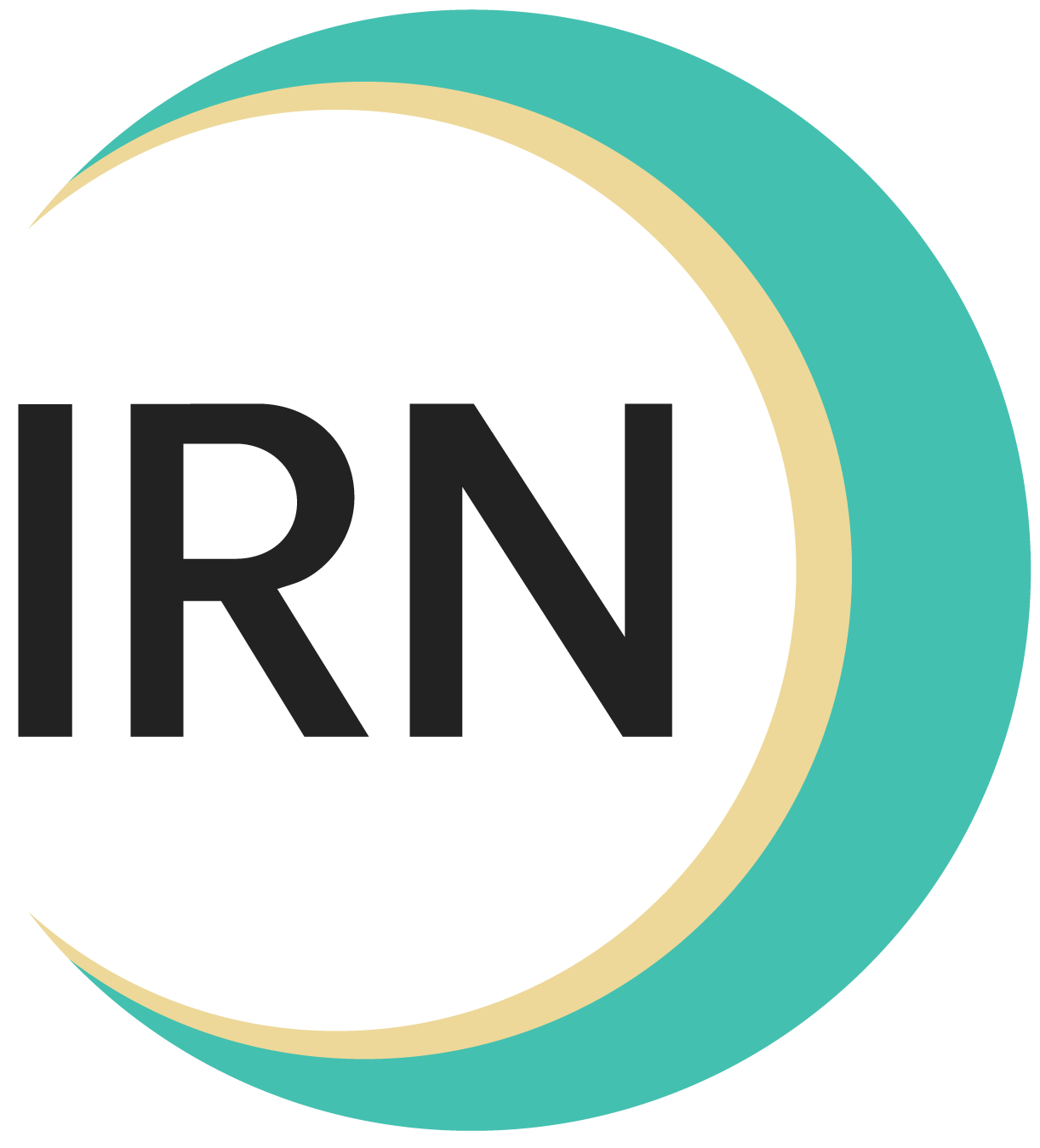
Logo of IRN

The Islamic Council Norway (Norwegian: Islamsk Råd Norge, IRN) is an umbrella organisation for Muslim congregations and organisations in Norway. Currently, it represents 41 congregations totalling about 60,000 members. The offices are located in Oslo. It is a member of the European Council for Fatwa and Research (ECFR).

== Organization ==
The Islamic Council Norway was founded on 22 October 1993. Since 2006, it has received state funding from the Norwegian Ministry of Culture . The funding was about 1,3 million NOK a year. The organisation's membership counts Muslim congregations centered around several different immigrant groups, notably Albanian, Bosnian, Iraqi and Pakistani congregations, as well as mosques with congregations that do not center around specific ethnic groups. Its stated mission is to

- engage in work that allows Norwegian Muslims to live according to Islamic teachings within the general Norwegian society and to establish a Norwegian Muslim identity
- promote solidarity among Norwegian Muslims and further the interests and rights of the member organizations
- act as a mediary and dialogue partner to create mutual understanding and respect between Norwegian Muslims and non-Muslims, with respect to religion, culture and moral values.

In 2017the IRN lost its state funding from the Norwegian Ministry of Culture. The ministry stated it was dissatisfied with how IRN had handled its role as a dialogue partner with the Norwegian majority society and its role as an umbrella organisation. Other muslim community leaders supported the decision and supported the view that IRN had not encouraged dialogue with Norwegian society. Community leaders had on previous occasions stated that IRN did not represent them.

== Activities ==
The organisation has since its foundation been in active dialogue with the Church of Norway Council on Ecumenical and International Relations.

The council's work is organised in issue-specific committees, such as a hilal committee that works to advise Norwegian Muslims on how the Islamic calendar should be interpreted in Norway, a Halal committee that oversees ritual slaughtering, in accordance with animal welfare laws, at designated Norwegian meat processing plants mainly owned by Nortura, and a burial committee, which collaborates with Norwegian Church Authorities to establish and maintain Muslim cemeteries.

== Controversies ==
=== Homosexuality ===
In 2008 the council met protest for an alleged refusal to take a stance against death penalty for homosexuality, instead deferring the matter to the European Fatwa Council (ECFR). The Council's leader, Senaid Kobilica, stressed his personal opposition to the death penalty, but acknowledged that some may interpret Islamic texts differently. Homosexual and lesbian activist groups protested against the council's refusal to deplore the death penalty.

=== Yusuf al-Qaradawi ===
The Islamic Council Norway was criticised in 2009 when, according to some sources, it refused to distance itself or comment on the leader of the European Council for Fatwa and Research (ECFR), Yusuf al-Qaradawi, after he praised the Holocaust as "a divine punishment for the Jews." However, the council's leader did in fact issue a statement where al-Qaradawis praise of Holocaust was deemed "unacceptable", and promised that the council would pursue the matter through its membership in the ECFR.

=== Niqab ===
In March 2017 the IRN hired Leyla Hasic, a woman who wears the face-covering veil niqab to work with communication and as a "bridge builder to mainstream society" for the organisation. She was a strong proponent of the garment. Minister of Culture Linda Hofstad Helleland criticised the appointment of Hasic as creating a greater distance between Muslim and Norwegian society and lessening the mutual understanding. Prime minister Erna Solberg publicly stated that a person wearing niqab would never be employed by her.
