= 2022–23 ISU Speed Skating World Cup – World Cup 4 =

International speed skating competition

2022—23 ISU Speed Skating World Cup 4
- Venue: Calgary Canada
- Dates: 16 December 2022 — 18 December 2022

The fourth competition weekend of the 2022–23 ISU Speed Skating World Cup was held at the Olympic Oval in Calgary, Canada, from Friday, 16 December, until Sunday, 18 December 2022.

== Medal summary ==
=== Men's events ===
Event	Gold	Time	Silver	Time	Bronze	Time	Report
500 m	Kim Jun-ho; South Korea	34.07	Jordan Stolz; United States	34.08	Laurent Dubreuil; Canada	34.10	
1000 m	Jordan Stolz; United States	1:06.72	Thomas Krol; Netherlands	1:07.16	David Bosa; Italy	1:07.24	
1500 m	Kjeld Nuis; Netherlands	1:42.59	Jordan Stolz; United States	1:43.19	Thomas Krol; Netherlands	1:43.34	
10000 m	Davide Ghiotto; Italy	12:45.10	Patrick Roest; Netherlands	12:51.50	Beau Snellink; Netherlands	12:53.34	
Mass start^{A}	Bart Swings; Belgium	60	Connor Howe; Canada	40	Hayden Mayeur; Canada	20	
Team sprint	Poland; Marek Kania; Piotr Michalski; Damian Żurek	1:18.90	Netherlands; Merijn Scheperkamp; Hein Otterspeer; Kjeld Nuis	1:18.93	Canada; Christopher Fiola; Laurent Dubreuil; Antoine Gélinas-Beaulieu	1:19.40	

^{A} In mass start, race points are accumulated during the race based on results of the intermediate sprints and the final sprint. The skater with most race points is the winner.

=== Women's events ===
Event	Gold	Time	Silver	Time	Bronze	Time	Report
500 m	Kim Min-sun; South Korea	36.96	Miho Takagi; Japan	37.26	Erin Jackson; United States	37.35	
1000 m	Jutta Leerdam; Netherlands	1:12.53	Miho Takagi; Japan	1:13.19	Kimi Goetz; United States	1:13.58	
1500 m	Miho Takagi; Japan	1:52.08	Antoinette Rijpma-de Jong; Netherlands	1:52.70	Nadezhda Morozova; Kazakhstan	1:53.03	
5000 m	Irene Schouten; Netherlands	6:48.06	Ragne Wiklund; Norway	6:52.86	Ivanie Blondin; Canada	6:54.81	
Mass start^{A}	Irene Schouten; Netherlands	60	Ivanie Blondin; Canada	40	Marijke Groenewoud; Netherlands	25	
Team sprint	United States; McKenzie Browne; Erin Jackson; Kimi Goetz	1:25.68	Canada; Carolina Hiller; Brooklyn McDougall; Ivanie Blondin	1:25.73	Netherlands; Michelle de Jong; Femke Kok; Isabel Grevelt	1:25.95	

^{A} In mass start, race points are accumulated during the race based on results of the intermediate sprints and the final sprint. The skater with most race points is the winner.

== Results ==
=== Men's events ===
==== 500 m ====
The race started on 17 December 2022 at 13:11.

Rank	Pair	Lane	Name	Country	Time	Diff
1st place, gold medalist(s)	8	i	Kim Jun-ho	South Korea	34.07	
2nd place, silver medalist(s)	9	o	Jordan Stolz	United States	34.08	+0.01
3rd place, bronze medalist(s)	10	o	Laurent Dubreuil	Canada	34.10	+0.03
4	9	i	Yuma Murakami	Japan	34.12	+0.05
5	2	i	Tatsuya Shinhama	Japan	34.17	+0.10
6	10	i	Wataru Morishige	Japan	34.19	+0.12
7	2	o	Kim Cheol-min	South Korea	34.32	+0.25
8	6	o	Dai Dai N'tab	Netherlands	34.41	+0.34
9	7	i	Takuya Morimoto	Japan	34.42	+0.35
10	8	o	Merijn Scheperkamp	Netherlands	34.43	+0.36
11	1	o	Nil Llop	Spain	34.50	+0.43
12	4	i	David Bosa	Italy	34.51	+0.44
13	4	o	Damian Żurek	Poland	34.54	+0.47
14	5	i	Piotr Michalski	Poland	34.56	+0.49
15	5	o	Marek Kania	Poland	34.58	+0.51
16	3	o	Cha Min-kyu	South Korea	34.60	+0.53
17	7	o	Janno Botman	Netherlands	34.64	+0.57
18	3	i	Håvard Holmefjord Lorentzen	Norway	34.65	+0.58
19	6	i	Christopher Fiola	Canada	34.67	+0.60
20	1	i	Cooper McLeod	United States	34.94	+0.87

==== 1000 m ====
The race started on 18 December 2022 at 14:22.

Rank	Pair	Lane	Name	Country	Time	Diff
1st place, gold medalist(s)	7	i	Jordan Stolz	United States	1:06.72	
2nd place, silver medalist(s)	8	o	Thomas Krol	Netherlands	1:07.16	+0.44
3rd place, bronze medalist(s)	3	i	David Bosa	Italy	1:07.24	+0.52
4	10	i	Hein Otterspeer	Netherlands	1:07.42	+0.70
5	4	i	Connor Howe	Canada	1:07.64	+0.92
6	5	i	Kazuya Yamada	Japan	1:07.68	+0.96
7	4	o	Håvard Holmefjord Lorentzen	Norway	1:07.70	+0.98
8	5	o	Masaya Yamada	Japan	1:07.80	+1.08
9	7	o	Antoine Gélinas-Beaulieu	Canada	1:07.85	+1.13
10	6	o	Moritz Klein	Germany	1:07.91	+1.19
11	9	o	Laurent Dubreuil	Canada	1:07.93	+1.21
12	10	o	Ryota Kojima	Japan	1:08.01	+1.29
13	1	i	Lian Ziwen	China	1:08.08	+1.36
14	3	o	Damian Żurek	Poland	1:08.10	+1.38
15	2	o	Cooper McLeod	United States	1:08.12	+1.40
16	6	i	Taiyo Nonomura	Japan	1:08.17	+1.45
17	8	i	Marten Liiv	Estonia	1:08.33	+1.61
18	9	i	Joep Wennemars	Netherlands	1:08.42	+1.70
19	2	i	Piotr Michalski	Poland	1:08.51	+1.79
20	1	o	Mathias Vosté	Belgium	1:08.55	+1.83

==== 1500 m ====
The race started on 16 December 2022 at 12:30.

Rank	Pair	Lane	Name	Country	Time	Diff
1st place, gold medalist(s)	9	o	Kjeld Nuis	Netherlands	1:42.59	
2nd place, silver medalist(s)	9	i	Jordan Stolz	United States	1:43.19	+0.60
3rd place, bronze medalist(s)	8	o	Thomas Krol	Netherlands	1:43.34	+0.75
4	5	o	Peder Kongshaug	Norway	1:43.59	+1.00
5	7	i	Sander Eitrem	Norway	1:43.63	+1.04
6	10	i	Patrick Roest	Netherlands	1:43.78	+1.19
7	6	o	Allan Dahl Johansson	Norway	1:43.87	+1.28
8	7	o	Kazuya Yamada	Japan	1:44.07	+1.48
9	10	o	Connor Howe	Canada	1:44.13	+1.54
10	8	i	Wesly Dijs	Netherlands	1:44.23	+1.64
11	6	i	Bart Swings	Belgium	1:44.26	+1.67
12	4	i	Masaya Yamada	Japan	1:44.72	+2.13
13	3	o	Ryota Kojima	Japan	1:44.99	+2.40
14	2	i	Alessio Trentini	Italy	1:45.02	+2.43
15	4	o	Tyson Langelaar	Canada	1:45.06	+2.47
16	2	o	Antoine Gélinas-Beaulieu	Canada	1:45.22	+2.63
17	3	i	Kristian Ulekleiv	Norway	1:45.66	+3.07
18	1	o	Moritz Klein	Germany	1:46.10	+3.51
19	1	i	Dmitry Morozov	Kazakhstan	1:46.34	+3.75
20	5	i	Taiyo Nonomura	Japan	1:47.39	+4.80

==== 10000 m ====
The race started on 17 December 2022 at 13:50.

Rank	Pair	Lane	Name	Country	Time	Diff
1st place, gold medalist(s)	5	i	Davide Ghiotto	Italy	12:45.10	
2nd place, silver medalist(s)	5	o	Patrick Roest	Netherlands	12:51.50	+6.40
3rd place, bronze medalist(s)	4	o	Beau Snellink	Netherlands	12:53.34	+8.24
4	6	o	Kars Jansman	Netherlands	12:58.77	+13.67
5	4	i	Bart Swings	Belgium	12:59.24	+14.14
6	3	i	Sigurd Henriksen	Norway	13:02.53	+17.43
7	1	o	Ryosuke Tsuchiya	Japan	13:06.32	+21.22
8	3	o	Graeme Fish	Canada	13:08.39	+23.29
9	1	i	Hallgeir Engebråten	Norway	13:09.95	+24.85
10	6	i	Sander Eitrem	Norway	13:14.92	+29.82
11	2	o	Felix Rijhnen	Germany	13:17.01	+31.91
12	2	i	Seitaro Ichinohe	Japan	13:40.33	+55.23

==== Mass start ====
The race started on 18 December 2022 at 15:24.

Rank	Name	Country	Points	Time
1st place, gold medalist(s)	Bart Swings	Belgium	60	7:33.20
2nd place, silver medalist(s)	Connor Howe	Canada	40	7:33.40
3rd place, bronze medalist(s)	Hayden Mayeur	Canada	20	7:33.54
4	Livio Wenger	Switzerland	10	7:33.65
5	Ethan Cepuran	United States	9	7:33.84
6	Daniele Di Stefano	Italy	5	7:49.21
7	Gabriel Odor	Austria	3	7:34.04
8	Ryosuke Tsuchiya	Japan	3	7:41.76
9	Timothy Loubineaud	France	2	7:42.17
10	Conor McDermot-Mostowy	United States	2	7:42.91
11	Felix Rijhnen	Germany	1	7:39.03
12	Kierryn Hughes	New Zealand	1	7:56.56
13	Lee Seung-hoon	South Korea	1	8:09.34
14	Jorrit Bergsma	Netherlands		7:34.50
15	Viktor Hald Thorup	Denmark		7:38.31
16	Allan Dahl Johansson	Norway		7:40.50
17	Andrea Giovannini	Italy		7:58.01

==== Team sprint ====
The race started on 16 December 2022 at 14:54.

Rank	Pair	Lane	Country	Time	Diff
1st place, gold medalist(s)	3	c	Poland; Marek Kania; Piotr Michalski; Damian Żurek	1:18.90	
2nd place, silver medalist(s)	5	s	Netherlands; Merijn Scheperkamp; Hein Otterspeer; Kjeld Nuis	1:18.93	+0.03
3rd place, bronze medalist(s)	3	s	Canada; Christopher Fiola; Laurent Dubreuil; Antoine Gélinas-Beaulieu	1:19.40	+0.50
4	6	c	Norway; Henrik Fagerli Rukke; Håvard Holmefjord Lorentzen; Odin By Farstad	1:19.45	+0.55
5	6	s	China; Yang Tao; Lian Ziwen; Wang Shiwei	1:19.51	+0.61
6	5	c	United States; Austin Kleba; Cooper McLeod; Conor McDermott-Mostowy	1:19.82	+0.92
7	4	s	Germany; Niklas Kurzmann; Hendrik Dombek; Moritz Klein	1:19.96	+1.06
8	2	s	South Korea; Kim Jun-ho; Kim Tae-yun; Park Seong-hyeon	1:20.59	+1.69
9	2	c	Kazakhstan; Yevgeniy Koshkin; Artur Galiyev; Alexandr Klenko	1:21.00	+2.10
10	1	s	Japan; Yuma Murakami; Wataru Morishige; Kota Kikuchi	1:22.23	+3.33
11	4	c	Italy; Francesco Betti; David Bosa; Alessio Trentini	2:07.98	+49.08

=== Women's events ===
==== 500 m ====
The race started on 16 December 2022 at 13:10.

Rank	Pair	Lane	Name	Country	Time	Diff
1st place, gold medalist(s)	9	i	Kim Min-sun	South Korea	36.96	
2nd place, silver medalist(s)	3	i	Miho Takagi	Japan	37.26	+0.30
3rd place, bronze medalist(s)	8	o	Erin Jackson	United States	37.35	+0.39
4	8	i	Femke Kok	Netherlands	37.38	+0.42
5	10	o	Jutta Leerdam	Netherlands	37.41	+0.45
6	5	i	Kimi Goetz	United States	37.43	+0.47
7	10	i	Vanessa Herzog	Austria	37.47	+0.51
8	7	o	Michelle de Jong	Netherlands	37.48	+0.52
9	6	i	Andżelika Wójcik	Poland	37.51	+0.55
10	6	o	Dione Voskamp	Netherlands	37.53	+0.57
11	7	i	Kurumi Inagawa	Japan	37.64	+0.68
12	9	o	Marrit Fledderus	Netherlands	37.65	+0.69
13	4	i	Konami Soga	Japan	37.78	+0.82
14	2	o	Carolina Hiller	Canada	37.85	+0.89
15	5	o	Yekaterina Aydova	Kazakhstan	37.93	+0.97
16	3	o	Lee Na-hyun	South Korea	38.06	+1.10
17	4	o	Kako Yamane	Japan	38.07	+1.11
18	1	o	Pei Chong	China	38.40	+1.44
19	1	i	Li Qishi	China	38.46	+1.44
20	2	i	Jin Jingzhu	China	38.49	+1.45

==== 1000 m ====
The race started on 18 December 2022 at 13:47.

Rank	Pair	Lane	Name	Country	Time	Diff
1st place, gold medalist(s)	8	i	Jutta Leerdam	Netherlands	1:12.53	
2nd place, silver medalist(s)	9	o	Miho Takagi	Japan	1:13.19	+0.66
3rd place, bronze medalist(s)	10	o	Kimi Goetz	United States	1:13.58	+1.05
4	9	i	Antoinette Rijpma-de Jong	Netherlands	1:13.61	+1.08
5	5	i	Yekaterina Aydova	Kazakhstan	1:13.74	+1.21
6	5	o	Ivanie Blondin	Canada	1:13.82	+1.29
7	10	i	Kim Min-sun	South Korea	1:14.15	+1.62
8	6	o	Michelle de Jong	Netherlands	1:14.35	+1.82
9	7	o	Vanessa Herzog	Austria	1:14.37	+1.84
10	8	o	Isabel Grevelt	Netherlands	1:14.47	+1.94
11	7	i	Li Qishi	China	1:14.63	+2.10
12	6	i	Marrit Fledderus	Netherlands	1:15.04	+2.51
13	4	o	Erin Jackson	United States	1:15.42	+2.89
14	1	o	Ellia Smeding	United Kingdom	1:15.46	+2.93
15	3	i	Kim Hyun-yung	South Korea	1:15.73	+3.20
16	4	i	Karolina Bosiek	Poland	1:16.14	+3.61
17	2	i	Martine Ripsrud	Norway	1:16.15	+3.62
18	3	o	Kako Yamane	Japan	1:16.22	+3.69
19	2	o	Sumire Kikuchi	Japan	1:16.37	+3.84
20	1	i	Andżelika Wójcik	Poland	1:16.90	+4.37

==== 1500 m ====
The race started on 17 December 2022 at 12:30.

Rank	Pair	Lane	Name	Country	Time	Diff
1st place, gold medalist(s)	10	i	Miho Takagi	Japan	1:52.08	
2nd place, silver medalist(s)	9	i	Antoinette Rijpma-de Jong	Netherlands	1:52.70	+0.62
3rd place, bronze medalist(s)	10	o	Nadezhda Morozova	Kazakhstan	1:53.03	+0.95
4	2	i	Brittany Bowe	United States	1:53.25	+1.17
5	9	o	Ivanie Blondin	Canada	1:54.07	+1.99
6	8	i	Ragne Wiklund	Norway	1:54.42	+2.34
7	7	o	Joy Beune	Netherlands	1:54.44	+2.36
8	6	i	Li Qishi	China	1:54.59	+2.51
9	6	o	Kimi Goetz	United States	1:54.61	+2.53
10	8	o	Marijke Groenewoud	Netherlands	1:54.68	+2.60
11	7	i	Ayano Sato	Japan	1:55.46	+3.38
12	5	o	Yekaterina Aydova	Kazakhstan	1:55.91	+3.83
13	5	i	Vanessa Herzog	Austria	1:56.97	+4.89
14	3	o	Isabelle Weidemann	Canada	1:57.47	+5.39
15	4	i	Béatrice Lamarche	Canada	1:57.49	+5.41
16	1	i	Reina Anema	Netherlands	1:57.57	+5.49
17	3	i	Karolina Bosiek	Poland	1:58.57	+6.49
18	4	o	Yuna Onodera	Japan	1:58.84	+6.76
19	1	o	Alexa Scott	Canada	2:02.03	+9.95
20	2	o	Sandrine Tas	Belgium	2:03.06	+10.98

==== 5000 m ====
The race started on 16 December 2022 at 13:49.

Rank	Pair	Lane	Name	Country	Time	Diff
1st place, gold medalist(s)	4	i	Irene Schouten	Netherlands	6:48.06	
2nd place, silver medalist(s)	5	i	Ragne Wiklund	Norway	6:52.86	+4.80
3rd place, bronze medalist(s)	6	i	Ivanie Blondin	Canada	6:54.81	+6.75
4	4	o	Joy Beune	Netherlands	6:58.00	+9.94
5	1	i	Martina Sábliková	Czech Republic	6:58.23	+10.17
6	5	o	Valérie Maltais	Canada	7:00.59	+12.53
7	6	o	Isabelle Weidemann	Canada	7:00.66	+12.60
8	2	o	Merel Conijn	Netherlands	7:04.77	+16.71
9	1	o	Magdalena Czyszczoń	Poland	7:05.50	+17.44
10	3	i	Ayano Sato	Japan	7:06.99	+18.93
11	3	o	Nadezhda Morozova	Kazakhstan	7:13.00	+24.94
12	2	i	Momoka Horikawa	Japan	7:14.84	+26.78

==== Mass start ====
The race started on 18 December 2022 at 15:05.

Rank	Name	Country	Points	Time
1st place, gold medalist(s)	Irene Schouten	Netherlands	60	8:08.74
2nd place, silver medalist(s)	Ivanie Blondin	Canada	40	8:09.37
3rd place, bronze medalist(s)	Marijke Groenewoud	Netherlands	25	8:09.85
4	Sumire Kikuchi	Japan	11	8:09.90
5	Laura Peveri	Italy	9	8:11.16
6	Momoka Horikawa	Japan	6	8:12.44
7	Kaitlyn McGregor	Switzerland	3	8:27.49
8	Michelle Uhrig	Germany	1	8:17.97
9	Mia Kilburg	United States		8:14.35
10	Sofie Karoline Haugen	Norway		8:18.15
11	Valérie Maltais	Canada		8:21.23
12	Sandrine Tas	Belgium		8:27.43
13	Ramona Härdi	Switzerland		8:27.66
14	Li Leming	China		8:30.09
15	Park Ji-woo	South Korea		8:31.83
16	Magdalena Czyszczoń	Poland		6:47.28

==== Team sprint ====
The race started on 17 December 2022 at 15:44.

Rank	Pair	Lane	Country	Time	Diff
1st place, gold medalist(s)	4	s	United States; McKenzie Browne; Erin Jackson; Kimi Goetz	1:25.68	
2nd place, silver medalist(s)	5	c	Canada; Carolina Hiller; Brooklyn McDougall; Ivanie Blondin	1:25.73	+0.05
3rd place, bronze medalist(s)	5	s	Netherlands; Michelle de Jong; Femke Kok; Isabel Grevelt	1:25.95	+0.27
4	2	s	China; Pei Cong; Jin Jingzhu; Li Qishi	1:26.80	+1.12
5	4	c	Japan; Konami Soga; Kurumi Inagawa; Sumire Kikuchi	1:27.34	+1.66
6	3	s	Poland; Martyna Baran; Andżelika Wójcik; Karolina Bosiek	1:27.38	+1.70
7	3	c	Kazakhstan; Alina Dauranova; Yekaterina Aydova; Nadezhda Morozova	1:27.68	+2.00
8	1	c	Germany; Katja Franzen; Lea Sophie Scholz; Michelle Uhrig	1:29.31	+3.63
9	2	c	South Korea; Kim Min-sun; Kim Hyun-yung; Lee Na-hyun	1:30.05	+4.37
10	1	s	Norway; Aurora Løvås; Julie Nistad Samsonsen; Martine Ripsrud	1:30.25	+4.57
