= 2022–23 ISU Speed Skating World Cup – World Cup 3 =

International speed skating competition

2022–23 ISU Speed Skating World Cup 3
- Venue: Calgary Canada
- Dates: 9 December 2022 — 11 December 2022

The third competition weekend of the 2022–23 ISU Speed Skating World Cup was held at the Olympic Oval in Calgary, Canada, from Friday, 9 December, until Sunday, 11 December 2022.

== Medal summary ==
=== Men's events ===
Event	Gold	Time	Silver	Time	Bronze	Time	Report
500 m	Laurent Dubreuil; Canada	34.01	Tatsuya Shinhama; Japan	34.18	Kim Jun-ho; South Korea	34.19	
1000 m	Hein Otterspeer; Netherlands	1:07.28	Laurent Dubreuil; Canada	1:07.30	Antoine Gélinas-Beaulieu; Canada	1:07.32	
1500 m	Wesly Dijs; Netherlands	1:42.93	Ning Zhongyan; China	1:42.95	Kjeld Nuis; Netherlands	1:43.02	
5000 m	Patrick Roest; Netherlands	6:05.60	Beau Snellink; Netherlands	6:09.58	Davide Ghiotto; Italy	6:10.66	
Mass start^{A}	Andrea Giovannini; Italy	61	Peter Michael; New Zealand	46	Vitaliy Chshigolev; Kazakhstan	21	
Team pursuit	United States; Ethan Cepuran; Emery Lehman; Casey Dawson	3:35.92	Canada; Antoine Gélinas-Beaulieu; Connor Howe; Hayden Mayeur	3:36.48	Norway; Sander Eitrem; Peder Kongshaug; Allan Dahl Johansson	3:39.88	

^{A} In mass start, race points are accumulated during the race based on results of the intermediate sprints and the final sprint. The skater with most race points is the winner.

=== Women's events ===
Event	Gold	Time	Silver	Time	Bronze	Time	Report
500 m	Kim Min-sun; South Korea	36.97	Vanessa Herzog; Austria	37.26	Jutta Leerdam; Netherlands	37.35	
1000 m	Jutta Leerdam; Netherlands	1:12.82	Kimi Goetz; United States	1:13.53	Vanessa Herzog; Austria	1:13.56	
1500 m	Miho Takagi; Japan	1:52.54	Nadezhda Morozova; Kazakhstan	1:52.82	Antoinette Rijpma-de Jong; Netherlands	1:52.93	
3000 m	Ragne Wiklund; Norway	3:56.93	Marijke Groenewoud; Netherlands	3:58.89	Antoinette Rijpma-de Jong; Netherlands	3:59.31	
Mass start^{A}	Irene Schouten; Netherlands	61	Mia Kilburg; United States	40	Marijke Groenewoud; Netherlands	21	
Team pursuit	Canada; Ivanie Blondin; Valérie Maltais; Isabelle Weidemann	2:54.49	Japan; Ayano Sato; Momoka Horikawa; Sumire Kikuchi	2:57.67	United States; Giorgia Birkeland; Brittany Bowe; Mia Kilburg	2:57.95	

^{A} In mass start, race points are accumulated during the race based on results of the intermediate sprints and the final sprint. The skater with most race points is the winner.

== Results ==
=== Men's events ===
==== 500 m ====
The race started on 10 December 2022 at 13:11.

Rank	Pair	Lane	Name	Country	Time	Diff
1st place, gold medalist(s)	10	i	Laurent Dubreuil	Canada	34.01	
2nd place, silver medalist(s)	1	o	Tatsuya Shinhama	Japan	34.18	+0.17
3rd place, bronze medalist(s)	8	o	Kim Jun-ho	South Korea	34.19	+0.18
4	9	i	Yuma Murakami	Japan	34.20	+0.19
5	6	i	Takuya Morimoto	Japan	34.30	+0.29
6	8	i	Merijn Scheperkamp	Netherlands	34.46	+0.45
7	7	i	Jordan Stolz	United States	34.47	+0.46
8	2	i	David Bosa	Italy	34.50	+0.49
9	1	i	Ryota Kojima	Japan	34.51	+0.50
10	3	o	Damian Żurek	Poland	34.53	+0.52
11	10	o	Wataru Morishige	Japan	34.57	+0.56
12	3	i	Håvard Holmefjord Lorentzen	Norway	34.65	+0.64
13	7	o	Christopher Fiola	Canada	34.67	+0.66
14	2	o	Marten Liiv	Estonia	34.68	+0.67
15	5	o	Marek Kania	Poland	34.80	+0.79
16	4	i	Cha Min-kyu	South Korea	34.81	+0.80
17	6	o	Dai Dai N'tab	Netherlands	34.81	+0.80
18	5	i	Piotr Michalski	Poland	34.81	+0.80
19	9	o	Janno Botman	Netherlands	34.85	+0.84
20	4	o	Yang Tao	China	34.90	+0.89

==== 1000 m ====
The race started on 11 December 2022 at 14:22.

Rank	Pair	Lane	Name	Country	Time	Diff
1st place, gold medalist(s)	7	i	Hein Otterspeer	Netherlands	1:07.28	
2nd place, silver medalist(s)	9	i	Laurent Dubreuil	Canada	1:07.30	+0.02
3rd place, bronze medalist(s)	3	i	Antoine Gélinas-Beaulieu	Canada	1:07.32	+0.04
4	5	o	Jordan Stolz	United States	1:07.34	+0.06
5	4	i	Taiyo Nonomura	Japan	1:07.43	+0.15
6	9	o	Ryota Kojima	Japan	1:07.49	+0.21
7	1	i	Kai Verbij	Netherlands	1:07.63	+0.35
8	8	i	Thomas Krol	Netherlands	1:07.70	+0.42
9	10	i	Marten Liiv	Estonia	1:07.78	+0.50
10	4	o	Håvard Holmefjord Lorentzen	Norway	1:07.79	+0.51
11	6	i	Moritz Klein	Germany	1:07.93	+0.65
12	10	o	Ning Zhongyan	China	1:07.93	+0.65
13	8	o	Joep Wennemars	Netherlands	1:08.08	+0.80
14	5	i	Connor Howe	Canada	1:08.16	+0.88
15	1	o	Cornelius Kersten	United Kingdom	1:08.16	+0.88
16	2	o	Cooper McLeod	United States	1:08.17	+0.89
17	6	o	Masaya Yamada	Japan	1:08.21	+0.93
18	7	o	Kazuya Yamada	Japan	1:08.25	+0.97
19	2	i	Wang Haotian	China	1:08.42	+1.14
20	3	o	Piotr Michalski	Poland	1:08.62	+1.34

==== 1500 m ====
The race started on 9 December 2022 at 12:30.

Rank	Pair	Lane	Name	Country	Time	Diff
1st place, gold medalist(s)	5	i	Wesly Dijs	Netherlands	1:42.93	
2nd place, silver medalist(s)	8	o	Ning Zhongyan	China	1:42.95	+0.02
3rd place, bronze medalist(s)	3	o	Kjeld Nuis	Netherlands	1:43.02	+0.09
4	9	i	Patrick Roest	Netherlands	1:43.09	+0.16
5	6	o	Sander Eitrem	Norway	1:43.23	+0.30
6	10	o	Connor Howe	Canada	1:43.68	+0.75
7	9	o	Thomas Krol	Netherlands	1:43.79	+0.86
8	7	i	Kazuya Yamada	Japan	1:43.90	+0.97
9	4	o	Allan Dahl Johansson	Norway	1:43.96	+1.03
10	7	o	Hallgeir Engebråten	Norway	1:44.07	+1.14
11	8	i	Jordan Stolz	United States	1:44.25	+1.32
12	6	i	Bart Swings	Belgium	1:44.42	+1.49
13	2	i	Tyson Langelaar	Canada	1:44.79	+1.86
14	5	o	Taiyo Nonomura	Japan	1:45.22	+2.29
15	1	i	Alessio Trentini	Italy	1:45.23	+2.30
16	1	o	Moritz Klein	Germany	1:45.32	+2.39
17	2	o	Dmitry Morozov	Kazakhstan	1:45.47	+2.54
18	3	i	Kristian Ulekleiv	Norway	1:45.64	+2.71
19	4	i	Masaya Yamada	Japan	1:46.69	+3.76
	10	i	Peder Kongshaug	Norway	Disqualified	

==== 5000 m ====
The race started on 10 December 2022 at 13:50.

Rank	Pair	Lane	Name	Country	Time	Diff
1st place, gold medalist(s)	8	o	Patrick Roest	Netherlands	6:05.60	
2nd place, silver medalist(s)	7	i	Beau Snellink	Netherlands	6:09.58	+3.98
3rd place, bronze medalist(s)	7	o	Davide Ghiotto	Italy	6:10.66	+5.06
4	8	i	Sander Eitrem	Norway	6:11.54	+5.94
5	3	o	Sigurd Henriksen	Norway	6:13.84	+8.24
6	5	o	Bart Swings	Belgium	6:14.10	+8.50
7	5	i	Kars Jansman	Netherlands	6:15.14	+9.54
8	2	i	Ethan Cepuran	United States	6:17.71	+12.11
9	6	i	Marcel Bosker	Netherlands	6:20.48	+14.88
10	4	o	Graeme Fish	Canada	6:21.94	+16.34
11	2	o	Peder Kongshaug	Norway	6:23.55	+17.95
12	3	i	Felix Rijhnen	Germany	6:23.68	+18.08
13	1	i	Kristian Ulekleiv	Norway	6:25.86	+20.26
14	4	i	Seitaro Ichinohe	Japan	6:29.06	+23.46
	1	o	Ted-Jan Bloemen	Canada	Disqualified	
	6	o	Hallgeir Engebråten	Norway	Did not start	

==== Mass start ====
The race started on 11 December 2022 at 15:24.

Rank	Name	Country	Points	Time
1st place, gold medalist(s)	Andrea Giovannini	Italy	61	7:53.04
2nd place, silver medalist(s)	Peter Michael	New Zealand	46	7:55.62
3rd place, bronze medalist(s)	Vitaliy Chshigolev	Kazakhstan	21	7:55.85
4	Philip Due Schmidt	Denmark	12	7:59.95
5	Chung Jae-won	South Korea	6	8:11.24
6	Bart Swings	Belgium	6	8:11.27
7	Viktor Hald Thorup	Denmark	3	8:27.91
8	Szymon Palka	Poland	2	8:15.30
9	Lee Seung-hoon	South Korea		8:11.33
10	Livio Wenger	Switzerland		8:11.39
11	Hayden Mayeur	Canada		8:11.42
12	Gabriel Odor	Austria		8:11.73
13	Kota Kikuchi	Japan		8:12.67
14	Felix Maly	Germany		8:12.97
15	Wang Hongli	China		8:13.09
16	Conor McDermott-Mostowy	United States		8:17.84
17	Bart Hoolwerf	Netherlands		8:54.70

==== Team pursuit ====
The race started on 9 December 2022 at 14:45.

Rank	Pair	Lane	Country	Time	Diff
1st place, gold medalist(s)	3	s	United States; Ethan Cepuran; Emery Lehman; Casey Dawson	3:35.92	
2nd place, silver medalist(s)	2	s	Canada; Antoine Gélinas-Beaulieu; Connor Howe; Hayden Mayeur	3:36.48	+0.56
3rd place, bronze medalist(s)	4	c	Norway; Sander Eitrem; Peder Kongshaug; Allan Dahl Johansson	3:39.88	+3.96
4	4	s	Italy; Daniele Di Stefano; Davide Ghiotto; Andrea Giovannini	3:41.70	+5.78
5	2	c	Japan; Riku Tsuchiya; Kazuya Yamada; Motonaga Arito	3:43.35	+7.43
6	3	c	Netherlands; Kars Jansman; Louis Hollaar; Beau Snellink	3:43.85	+7.93
7	1	s	Denmark; Philip Due Schmidt; Stefan Due Schmidt; Viktor Hald Thorup	3:45.99	+10.07
8	1	c	China; Wang Hongli; Shen Hanyang; Wang Shiwei	3:50.75	+14.83

=== Women's events ===
==== 500 m ====
The race started on 9 December 2022 at 13:10.

Rank	Pair	Lane	Name	Country	Time	Diff
1st place, gold medalist(s)	8	o	Kim Min-sun	South Korea	36.97	
2nd place, silver medalist(s)	9	i	Vanessa Herzog	Austria	37.26	+0.29
3rd place, bronze medalist(s)	9	o	Jutta Leerdam	Netherlands	37.35	+0.38
4	7	o	Femke Kok	Netherlands	37.35	+0.38
5	6	o	Kurumi Inagawa	Japan	37.39	+0.42
6	10	i	Erin Jackson	United States	37.45	+0.48
7	10	o	Marrit Fledderus	Netherlands	37.51	+0.54
8	6	i	Andżelika Wójcik	Poland	37.54	+0.57
9	7	i	Dione Voskamp	Netherlands	37.57	+0.60
10	8	i	Michelle de Jong	Netherlands	37.69	+0.72
11	5	i	Kimi Goetz	United States	37.69	+0.72
12	3	i	Konami Soga	Japan	37.87	+0.90
13	4	i	Yekaterina Aydova	Kazakhstan	37.88	+0.91
14	2	o	Martine Ripsrud	Norway	37.90	+0.93
15	5	o	Kako Yamane	Japan	38.13	+1.16
16	2	i	Carolina Hiller	Canada	38.24	+1.27
17	3	o	Lee Na-hyun	South Korea	38.24	+1.27
18	1	i	Alina Dauranova	Kazakhstan	38.26	+1.29
19	4	o	Jin Jingzhu	China	38.46	+1.49
20	1	o	Suzune Usami	Japan	38.49	+1.52

==== 1000 m ====
The race started on 11 December 2022 at 13:47.

Rank	Pair	Lane	Name	Country	Time	Diff
1st place, gold medalist(s)	9	o	Jutta Leerdam	Netherlands	1:12.82	
2nd place, silver medalist(s)	7	o	Kimi Goetz	United States	1:13.53	+0.71
3rd place, bronze medalist(s)	5	o	Vanessa Herzog	Austria	1:13.56	+0.74
4	10	i	Miho Takagi	Japan	1:13.57	+0.75
5	9	i	Antoinette Rijpma-de Jong	Netherlands	1:13.64	+0.82
6	8	o	Kim Min-sun	South Korea	1:13.79	+0.97
7	8	i	Isabel Grevelt	Netherlands	1:14.17	+1.35
8	6	i	Michelle de Jong	Netherlands	1:14.29	+1.47
9	2	i	Ayano Sato	Japan	1:14.39	+1.57
10	4	o	Yekaterina Aydova	Kazakhstan	1:14.61	+1.79
11	1	o	Brittany Bowe	United States	1:14.81	+1.99
12	10	o	Li Qishi	China	1:14.99	+2.17
13	7	i	Marrit Fledderus	Netherlands	1:15.00	+2.18
14	6	o	Ivanie Blondin	Canada	1:15.08	+2.26
15	2	o	Ellia Smeding	United Kingdom	1:15.12	+2.30
16	4	i	Erin Jackson	United States	1:51.21	+2.39
17	3	o	Han Mei	China	1:15.52	+2.70
18	5	i	Karolina Bosiek	Poland	1:16.52	+3.70
19	3	i	Kako Yamane	Japan	1:16.77	+3.95

==== 1500 m ====
The race started on 10 December 2022 at 12:30.

Rank	Pair	Lane	Name	Country	Time	Diff
1st place, gold medalist(s)	9	o	Miho Takagi	Japan	1:52.54	
2nd place, silver medalist(s)	9	i	Nadezhda Morozova	Kazakhstan	1:52.82	+0.28
3rd place, bronze medalist(s)	8	i	Antoinette Rijpma-de Jong	Netherlands	1:52.93	+0.39
4	8	o	Ragne Wiklund	Norway	1:53.26	+0.72
5	6	o	Ayano Sato	Japan	1:53.76	+1.22
6	10	o	Ivanie Blondin	Canada	1:53.86	+1.32
7	6	i	Jutta Leerdam	Netherlands	1:54.12	+1.58
8	5	o	Kimi Goetz	United States	1:54.52	+1.98
9	5	i	Han Mei	China	1:54.58	+2.04
10	10	i	Marijke Groenewoud	Netherlands	1:54.65	+2.11
11	7	i	Joy Beune	Netherlands	1:54.80	+2.26
12	7	o	Li Qishi	China	1:54.91	+2.37
13	3	i	Vanessa Herzog	Austria	1:54.92	+2.38
14	3	o	Béatrice Lamarche	Canada	1:56.94	+4.42
15	4	o	Yekaterina Aydova	Kazakhstan	1:57.35	+4.81
16	2	o	Reina Anema	Netherlands	1:57.52	+4.98
17	2	i	Sandrine Tas	Belgium	1:57.67	+5.13
18	1	i	Kaitlyn McGregor	Switzerland	1:58.13	+5.59
19	4	i	Yuna Onodera	Japan	1:59.07	+6.53
20	1	o	Karolina Bosiek	Poland	2:01.13	+8.59

==== 3000 m ====
The race started on 9 December 2022 at 13:49.

Rank	Pair	Lane	Name	Country	Time	Diff
1st place, gold medalist(s)	7	i	Ragne Wiklund	Norway	3:56.93	
2nd place, silver medalist(s)	6	i	Marijke Groenewoud	Netherlands	3:58.89	+1.96
3rd place, bronze medalist(s)	5	o	Antoinette Rijpma-de Jong	Netherlands	3:59.31	+2.38
4	7	o	Ivanie Blondin	Canada	3:59.74	+2.81
5	6	o	Joy Beune	Netherlands	4:01.41	+4.48
6	5	i	Valérie Maltais	Canada	4:01.87	+4.94
7	8	o	Irene Schouten	Netherlands	4:02.86	+5.93
8	4	i	Ayano Sato	Japan	4:02.99	+6.06
9	4	o	Nadezhda Morozova	Kazakhstan	4:03.90	+6.97
10	3	o	Han Mei	China	4:03.94	+7.01
11	8	i	Isabelle Weidemann	Canada	4:05.96	+9.03
12	2	i	Merel Conijn	Netherlands	4:06.69	+9.76
13	3	i	Yang Binyu	China	4:09.43	+12.50
14	1	o	Mia Kilburg	United States	4:10.33	+13.40
15	1	i	Magdalena Czyszczoń	Poland	4:12.25	+15.32
16	2	o	Momoka Horikawa	Japan	4:13.28	+16.35

==== Mass start ====
The race started on 11 December 2022 at 15:05.

Rank	Name	Country	Points	Time
1st place, gold medalist(s)	Irene Schouten	Netherlands	61	8:33.70
2nd place, silver medalist(s)	Mia Kilburg	United States	40	8:33.79
3rd place, bronze medalist(s)	Marijke Groenewoud	Netherlands	21	8:33.82
4	Sumire Kikuchi	Japan	10	8:33.89
5	Laura Peveri	Italy	6	8:34.04
6	Sandrine Tas	Belgium	4	8:51.54
7	Park Ji-woo	South Korea	3	8:34.32
8	Kaitlyn McGregor	Switzerland	3	8:36.57
9	Michelle Uhrig	Germany	3	8:51.84
10	Ramona Härdi	Switzerland	2	8:36.75
11	Yang Binyu	China		8:34.37
12	Valérie Maltais	Canada		8:34.84
13	Giorgia Birkeland	United States		8:35.29
14	Karolina Bosiek	Poland		8:35.30
15	Claudia Pechstein	Germany		8:42.16
16	Ivanie Blondin	Canada	4	Disqualified

==== Team pursuit ====
The race started on 10 December 2022 at 15:04.

Rank	Pair	Lane	Country	Time	Diff
1st place, gold medalist(s)	4	s	Canada; Ivanie Blondin; Valérie Maltais; Isabelle Weidemann	2:54.49	
2nd place, silver medalist(s)	5	c	Japan; Ayano Sato; Momoka Horikawa; Sumire Kikuchi	2:57.67	+3.18
3rd place, bronze medalist(s)	3	c	United States; Giorgia Birkeland; Brittany Bowe; Mia Kilburg	2:57.95	+3.46
4	4	c	Netherlands; Reina Anema; Marijke Groenewoud; Irene Schouten	3:00.50	+6.01
5	5	s	Poland; Olga Kaczmarek; Karolina Bosiek; Magdalena Czyszczoń	3:02.57	+8.08
6	1	s	Norway; Sofie Karoline Haugen; Aurora Løvås; Ragne Wiklund	3:02.58	+8.09
7	2	s	Germany; Lea Sophie Scholz; Josie Hofmann; Michelle Uhrig	3:04.22	+9.73
8	1	c	Switzerland; Kaitlyn McGregor; Ramone Härdi; Nadja Wenger	3:05.92	+11.43
9	2	c	South Korea; Hwang Hyun-sun; Park Ji-woo; Park Chae-won	3:12.20	+17.71
10	3	s	China; Li Qishi; Yang Binyu; Han Mei	3:49.89	+55.40
