= 2022–23 ISU Speed Skating World Cup – World Cup 2 =

International speed skating competition

2022–23 ISU Speed Skating World Cup 2
- Venue: Heerenveen Netherlands
- Dates: 18 November — 20 November 2022

The second competition weekend of the 2022–23 ISU Speed Skating World Cup was held at Thialf in Heerenveen, the Netherlands, from Friday, 18 November, until Sunday, 20 November 2022.

== Medal summary ==
=== Men's events ===
Event	Gold	Time	Silver	Time	Bronze	Time	Report
500 m	Laurent Dubreuil; Canada	34.34	Wataru Morishige; Japan	34.45	Merijn Scheperkamp; Netherlands	34.69	
1000 m	Ning Zhongyan; China	1:07.86	Joep Wennemars; Netherlands	1:08.08	Marten Liiv; Estonia	1:08.11	
1500 m	Connor Howe; Canada	1:43.38	Kjeld Nuis; Netherlands	1:43.68	Thomas Krol; Netherlands	1:43.83	
5000 m	Patrick Roest; Netherlands	6:04.36; TR	Sander Eitrem; Norway	6:08.24	Hallgeir Engebråten; Norway	6:09.44	
Mass start^{A}	Bart Hoolwerf; Netherlands	60	Chung Jae-won; South Korea	40	Andrea Giovannini; Italy	20	
Team sprint	China; Yang Tao; Lian Ziwen; Ning Zhongyan	1:19.55	Netherlands; Merijn Scheperkamp; Hein Otterspeer; Joep Wennemars	1:19.82	United States; Austin Kleba; Cooper McLeod; Jordan Stolz	1:19.90	

^{A} In mass start, race points are accumulated during the race based on results of the intermediate sprints and the final sprint. The skater with most race points is the winner.

=== Women's events ===
Event	Gold	Time	Silver	Time	Bronze	Time	Report
500 m	Kim Min-sun; South Korea	37.21	Vanessa Herzog; Austria	37.48	Jutta Leerdam; Netherlands	37.51	
1000 m	Jutta Leerdam; Netherlands	1:13.77	Miho Takagi; Japan	1:13.92	Isabel Grevelt; Netherlands	1:14.54	
1500 m	Antoinette Rijpma-de Jong; Netherlands	1:53.73	Miho Takagi; Japan	1:53.92	Marijke Groenewoud; Netherlands	1:54.64	
3000 m	Irene Schouten; Netherlands	3:54.04; TR	Isabelle Weidemann; Canada	3:57.70	Ragne Wiklnud; Norway	3:58.31	
Mass start^{A}	Irene Schouten; Netherlands	68	Marijke Groenewoud; Netherlands	40	Ivanie Blondin; Canada	20	
Team sprint	Netherlands; Michelle de Jong; Marrit Fledderus; Femke Kok	1:26.57	Canada; Carolina Hiller; Brooklyn McDougall; Ivanie Blondin	1:27.45	United States; McKenzie Browne; Erin Jackson; Kimi Goetz	1:27.72	

^{A} In mass start, race points are accumulated during the race based on results of the intermediate sprints and the final sprint. The skater with most race points is the winner.

== Results ==
=== Men's events ===
==== 500 m ====
The race started on 19 November 2022 at 15:26.

Rank	Pair	Lane	Name	Country	Time	Diff
1st place, gold medalist(s)	10	i	Laurent Dubreuil	Canada	34.34	
2nd place, silver medalist(s)	8	o	Wataru Morishige	Japan	34.45	+0.11
3rd place, bronze medalist(s)	6	i	Merijn Scheperkamp	Netherlands	34.69	+0.35
4	4	i	Jordan Stolz	United States	34.70	+0.36
5	10	o	Yuma Murakami	Japan	34.72	+0.38
6	8	i	Janno Botman	Netherlands	34.78	+0.44
7	6	o	Dai Dai N'tab	Netherlands	34.88	+0.54
8	7	i	Christopher Fiola	Canada	34.91	+0.57
9	7	o	Piotr Michalski	Poland	34.94	+0.60
10	4	o	Marek Kania	Poland	34.95	+0.61
11	1	i	Cha Min-kyu	South Korea	34.98	+0.64
12	1	o	David Bosa	Italy	34.99	+0.65
13	9	i	Kim Jun-ho	South Korea	35.01	+0.67
14	9	o	Takuya Morimoto	Japan	35.02	+0.68
15	3	i	Yang Tao	China	35.05	+0.71
16	2	o	Yevgeniy Koshkin	Kazakhstan	35.06	+0.72
17	2	i	Taiyo Nonomura	Japan	35.11	+0.77
18	5	o	Håvard Holmefjord Lorentzen	Canada	35.18	+0.84
19	3	o	Cedrick Burnet	Canada	35.42	+1.08
20	5	i	Damian Żurek	Poland	35.48	+1.14

==== 1000 m ====
The race started on 18 November 2022 at 18:48.

Rank	Pair	Lane	Name	Country	Time	Diff
1st place, gold medalist(s)	7	i	Ning Zhongyan	China	1:07.86	
2nd place, silver medalist(s)	6	i	Joep Wennemars	Netherlands	1:08.08	+0.22
3rd place, bronze medalist(s)	3	i	Marten Liiv	Estonia	1:08.11	+0.25
4	5	o	Kazuya Yamada	Japan	1:08.20	+0.34
5	8	i	Thomas Krol	Netherlands	1:08.32	+0.46
6	6	o	Moritz Klein	Germany	1:08.40	+0.54
7	1	o	Kjeld Nuis	Netherlands	1:08.52	+0.66
8	10	i	Hein Otterspeer	Netherlands	1:08.57	+0.71
9	5	i	Connor Howe	Canada	1:08.64	+0.78
10	9	o	Laurent Dubreuil	Canada	1:08.68	+0.82
11	8	o	Ryota Kojima	Japan	1:08.70	+0.84
12	2	i	Damian Żurek	Poland	1:08.73	+0.87
12	4	o	Håvard Holmefjord Lorentzen	Norway	1:08.73	+0.87
14	1	i	David Bosa	Italy	1:08.93	+1.07
15	4	i	Antoine Gélinas-Beaulieu	Canada	1:08.99	+1.13
16	7	o	Taiyo Nonomura	Japan	1:09.18	+1.32
17	2	o	Henrik Fagerli Rukke	Norway	1:09.36	+1.50
18	10	o	Masaya Yamada	Japan	1:09.79	+1.93
19	3	o	Kim Tae-yun	South Korea	1:10.36	+2.50
	9	i	Jordan Stolz	United States	Disqualified	

==== 1500 m ====
The race started on 20 November 2022 at 13:30.

Rank	Pair	Lane	Name	Country	Time	Diff
1st place, gold medalist(s)	9	o	Connor Howe	Canada	1:43.38	
2nd place, silver medalist(s)	1	o	Kjeld Nuis	Netherlands	1:43.64	+0.26
3rd place, bronze medalist(s)	2	i	Thomas Krol	Netherlands	1:43.83	+0.45
4	9	i	Peder Kongshaug	Norway	1:43.86	+0.48
5	8	o	Ning Zhongyan	China	1:43.91	+0.53
6	7	i	Patrick Roest	Netherlands	1:44.11	+0.73
7	4	o	Hallgeir Engebråten	Norway	1:44.20	+0.82
8	4	i	Sander Eitrem	Norway	1:44.24	+0.86
9	8	i	Jordan Stolz	United States	1:44.27	+0.89
10	5	o	Taiyo Nonomura	Japan	1:44.57	+1.19
11	7	o	Bart Swings	Belgium	1:44.59	+1.21
12	3	i	Allan Dahl Johansson	Norway	1:44.77	+1.39
13	6	i	Wesly Dijs	Netherlands	1:45.20	+1.82
14	3	o	Louis Hollaar	Netherlands	1:45.38	+2.00
15	2	o	Ryota Kojima	Japan	1:45.39	+2.01
16	10	o	Kazuya Yamada	Japan	1:45.45	+2.07
17	6	o	Kristian Ulekleiv	Norway	1:45.69	+2.31
18	5	i	Tyson Langelaar	Canada	1:45.82	+2.44
19	1	i	Antoine Gélinas-Beaulieu	Canada	1:45.98	+2.60
20	10	i	Masaya Yamada	Japan	1:47.81	+4.43

==== 5000 m ====
The race started on 19 November 2022 at 16:05.

Rank	Pair	Lane	Name	Country	Time	Diff
1st place, gold medalist(s)	6	i	Patrick Roest	Netherlands	6:04.36; TR	
2nd place, silver medalist(s)	4	i	Sander Eitrem	Norway	6:08.24	+3.88
3rd place, bronze medalist(s)	6	o	Hallgeir Engebråten	Norway	6:09.44	+5.08
4	7	o	Beau Snellink	Netherlands	6:11.81	+7.45
5	7	i	Davide Ghiotto	Italy	6:13.14	+8.78
6	5	i	Bart Swings	Belgium	6:14.80	+10.44
7	8	o	Kars Jansman	Netherlands	6:15.22	+10.86
8	8	i	Marcel Bosker	Netherlands	6:15.31	+10.95
9	3	i	Graeme Fish	Canada	6:17.29	+12.93
10	5	o	Seitaro Ichinohe	Japan	6:17.64	+13.28
11	2	o	Sigurd Henriksen	Norway	6:17.67	+13.31
12	1	o	Jorrit Bergsma	Netherlands	6:17.99	+13.63
13	2	i	Jordan Belchos	Canada	6:19.98	+15.62
14	4	o	Felix Rijhnen	Germany	6:20.70	+16.34
15	3	o	Riku Tsuchiya	Japan	6:20.86	+16.50
16	1	i	Ryosuke Tsuchiya	Japan	6:21.01	+16.65

==== Mass start ====
The race started on 18 November 2022 at 19:55.

Rank	Name	Country	Points	Time
1st place, gold medalist(s)	Bart Hoolwerf	Netherlands	60	7:39.12
2nd place, silver medalist(s)	Chung Jae-won	South Korea	40	7:39.27
3rd place, bronze medalist(s)	Andrea Giovannini	Italy	20	7:39.40
4	Bart Swings	Belgium	10	7:39.53
5	Connor Howe	Canada	6	7:39.67
6	Jorrit Bergsma	Netherlands	5	7:54.88
7	Kota Kikuchi	Japan	3	7:40.05
8	Livio Wenger	Switzerland	3	7:43.11
9	Gabriel Odor	Austria	3	7:44.29
10	Felix Rijhnen	Germany	3	8:06.60
11	Viktor Hald Thorup	Denmark	2	8:03.48
12	Ethan Cepuran	United States	1	7:41.15
13	Felix Maly	Germany	1	7:55.55
14	Kristian Ulekleiv	Norway		7:40.16
15	Daniele Di Stefano	Italy		7:40.20
16	Ryosuke Tsuchiya	Japan		7:55.66

==== Team sprint ====
The race started on 20 November 2022 at 15:45.

Rank	Pair	Lane	Country	Time	Diff
1st place, gold medalist(s)	6	s	China; Yang Tao; Lian Ziwen; Ning Zhongyan	1:19.55	
2nd place, silver medalist(s)	3	c	Netherlands; Merijn Scheperkamp; Hein Otterspeer; Joep Wennemars	1:19.82	+0.27
3rd place, bronze medalist(s)	2	s	United States; Austin Kleba; Cooper McLeod; Jordan Stolz	1:19.90	+0.35
4	6	c	Norway; Henrik Fagerli Rukke; Håvard Holmefjord Lorentzen; Odin By Farstad	1:19.91	+0.36
5	3	s	Germany; Niklas Kurzmann; Hendrik Dombek; Moritz Klein	1:20.27	+0.72
6	5	c	Italy; Francesco Betti; David Bosa; Alessio Trentini	1:20.42	+0.87
7	4	s	Canada; Christopher Fiola; Laurent Dubreuil; Connor Howe	1:20.58	+1.03
8	5	s	Poland; Marek Kania; Piotr Michalski; Damian Żurek	1:20.74	+1.19
9	2	c	South Korea; Kim Tae-yun; Kim Jun-ho; Park Seong-hyeon	1:21.84	+2.29
10	4	c	Kazakhstan; Yevgeniy Koshkin; Artur Galiyev; Demyan Gavrilov	1:22.88	+3.33
11	1	s	Austria; Alexander Farthofer; Ignaz Gschwentner; Gabriel Odor	1:24.55	+5.00

=== Women's events ===
==== 500 m ====
The race started on 20 November 2022 at 14:10.

Rank	Pair	Lane	Name	Country	Time	Diff
1st place, gold medalist(s)	10	i	Kim Min-sun	South Korea	37.21	
2nd place, silver medalist(s)	8	o	Vanessa Herzog	Austria	37.48	+0.27
3rd place, bronze medalist(s)	10	o	Jutta Leerdam	Netherlands	37.51	+0.30
4	7	i	Erin Jackson	United States	37.53	+0.32
5	7	o	Marrit Fledderus	Netherlands	37.55	+0.34
6	5	i	Femke Kok	Netherlands	37.66	+0.45
7	6	o	Kurumi Inagawa	Japan	37.69	+0.48
8	6	i	Kimi Goetz	United States	37.84	+0.63
9	9	o	Dione Voskamp	Netherlands	37.89	+0.68
10	1	o	Konami Soga	Japan	37.92	+0.71
11	8	i	Michelle de Jong	Netherlands	37.92	+0.71
12	9	i	Andżelika Wójcik	Poland	37.99	+0.78
13	3	i	Yekaterina Aydova	Kazakhstan	38.01	+0.80
14	5	o	Kako Yamane	Japan	38.08	+0.87
15	4	o	Jin Jingzhu	China	38.11	+0.90
16	3	o	Carolina Hiller	Canada	38.28	+1.07
17	2	o	Brooklyn McDougall	Canada	38.51	+1.30
18	4	i	Lee Na-hyun	South Korea	38.54	+1.33
19	2	i	Li Qishi	China	38.57	+1.36
20	1	i	Zhang Lina	China	39.11	+1.90

==== 1000 m ====
The race started on 18 November 2022 at 18:13.

Rank	Pair	Lane	Name	Country	Time	Diff
1st place, gold medalist(s)	9	i	Jutta Leerdam	Netherlands	1:13.77	
2nd place, silver medalist(s)	8	i	Miho Takagi	Japan	1:13.92	+0.15
3rd place, bronze medalist(s)	4	i	Isabel Grevelt	Netherlands	1:14.54	+0.77
4	10	i	Antoinette Rijpma-de Jong	Netherlands	1:14.74	+0.97
5	7	i	Marrit Fledderus	Netherlands	1:14.76	+0.99
6	8	o	Li Qishi	China	1:14.82	+1.05
7	10	o	Kimi Goetz	United States	1:15.14	+1.37
8	9	o	Kim Min-sun	South Korea	1:15.24	+1.47
9	2	o	Vanessa Herzog	Austria	1:15.31	+1.54
10	5	o	Ivanie Blondin	Canada	1:15.40	+1.63
11	7	o	Michelle de Jong	Netherlands	1:15.96	+2.19
12	3	i	Yekaterina Aydova	Kazakhstan	1:16.08	+2.31
13	5	i	Andżelika Wójcik	Poland	1:16.11	+2.34
14	3	o	Han Mei	China	1:16.30	+2.53
15	1	o	Nadezhda Morozova	Kazakhstan	1:16.73	+2.96
16	4	o	Erin Jackson	United States	1:16.74	+2.97
17	6	i	Karolina Bosiek	Poland	1:16.88	+3.11
18	2	i	Alexa Scott	Canada	1:17.16	+3.39
19	1	i	Jin Jingzhu	China	1:18.63	+4.86
20	6	o	Kim Hyun-yung	South Korea	1:19.04	+5.27

==== 1500 m ====
The race started on 19 November 2022 at 14:45.

Rank	Pair	Lane	Name	Country	Time	Diff
1st place, gold medalist(s)	8	o	Antoinette Rijpma-de Jong	Netherlands	1:53.73	
2nd place, silver medalist(s)	9	i	Miho Takagi	Japan	1:53.92	+0.19
3rd place, bronze medalist(s)	10	o	Marijke Groenewoud	Netherlands	1:54.64	+0.91
4	8	i	Nadezhda Morozova	Kazakhstan	1:54.86	+1.13
5	10	i	Ivanie Blondin	Canada	1:54.94	+1.21
6	7	i	Joy Beune	Netherlands	1:54.97	+1.24
7	7	o	Li Qishi	China	1:55.22	+1.49
8	6	o	Jutta Leerdam	Netherlands	1:55.65	+1.92
9	6	i	Ayano Sato	Japan	1:55.67	+1.94
10	5	i	Han Mei	China	1:55.91	+2.18
11	5	o	Kimi Goetz	United States	1:56.06	+2.33
12	9	o	Ragne Wiklund	Norway	1:56.22	+2.49
13	2	o	Vanessa Herzog	Austria	1:57.25	+3.52
14	3	o	Yekaterina Aydova	Kazakhstan	1:57.26	+3.53
15	4	o	Momoka Horikawa	Japan	1:58.19	+4.46
16	2	i	Béatrice Lamarche	Canada	1:58.78	+5.05
17	4	i	Yuna Onodera	Japan	1:59.15	+5.42
18	1	i	Alexa Scott	Canada	1:59.54	+5.81
19	3	i	Karolina Bosiek	Poland	1:59.66	+5.93
20	1	o	Shione Kaminaga	Japan	2:01.32	+7.59

==== 3000 m ====
The race started on 20 November 2022 at 14:49.

Rank	Pair	Lane	Name	Country	Time	Diff
1st place, gold medalist(s)	6	i	Irene Schouten	Netherlands	3:54.04; TR	
2nd place, silver medalist(s)	6	o	Isabelle Weidemann	Canada	3:57.70	+3.66
3rd place, bronze medalist(s)	7	o	Ragne Wiklund	Norway	3:58.31	+4.27
4	5	o	Joy Beune	Netherlands	3:58.72	+4.68
5	5	i	Ivanie Blondin	Canada	3:59.82	+5.78
6	7	i	Marijke Groenewoud	Netherlands	3:59.90	+5.86
7	8	i	Martina Sábliková	Czech Republic	4:00.13	+6.09
8	8	o	Antoinette Rijpma-de Jong	Netherlands	4:00.24	+6.20
9	3	o	Nadezhda Morozova	Kazakhstan	4:02.83	+8.79
10	4	i	Valérie Maltais	Canada	4:03.98	+9.94
11	3	i	Ayano Sato	Japan	4:04.10	+10.06
12	2	i	Momoka Horikawa	Japan	4:04.97	+10.93
13	1	o	Miho Takagi	Japan	4:05.06	+11.02
14	2	o	Magdalena Czyszczoń	Poland	4:07.72	+13.68
15	4	o	Yang Binyu	China	4:08.51	+14.47
16	1	i	Josie Hofmann	Germany	4:14.79	+20.75

==== Mass start ====
The race started on 18 November 2022 at 19:37.

Rank	Name	Country	Points	Time
1st place, gold medalist(s)	Irene Schouten	Netherlands	68	8:30.34
2nd place, silver medalist(s)	Marijke Groenewoud	Netherlands	40	8:48.55
3rd place, bronze medalist(s)	Ivanie Blondin	Canada	20	8:48.57
4	Laura Peveri	Italy	11	8:49.05
5	Valérie Maltais	Canada	6	8:49.26
6	Mia Kilburg	United States	3	8:49.50
7	Ramona Härdi	Switzerland	2	8:57.48
8	Kaitlyn McGregor	Switzerland	1	8:52.89
9	Giorgia Birkeland	United States	1	8:54.66
10	Yang Binyu	China		8:49.91
11	Sandrine Tas	Belgium		8:50.65
12	Michelle Uhrig	Germany		8:50.95
13	Momoka Horikawa	Japan		8:51.54
14	Sumire Kikuchi	Japan		8:57.72
15	Park Ji-woo	South Korea		8:58.47
16	Claudia Pechstein	Germany		8:02.39

==== Team sprint ====
The race started on 19 November 2022 at 17:19.

Rank	Pair	Lane	Country	Time	Diff
1st place, gold medalist(s)	4	c	Netherlands; Michelle de Jong; Marrit Fledderus; Femke Kok	1:26.57	
2nd place, silver medalist(s)	5	c	Canada; Carolina Hiller; Brooklyn McDougall; Ivanie Blondin	1:27.45	+0.88
3rd place, bronze medalist(s)	1	c	United States; McKenzie Browne; Erin Jackson; Kimi Goetz	1:27.72	+1.15
4	2	c	Japan; Kako Yamane; Kurumi Inagawa; Sumire Kikuchi	1:27.96	+1.39
5	5	s	Poland; Martyna Baran; Andżelika Wójcik; Karolina Bosiek	1:28.53	+1.96
6	1	s	Kazakhstan; Alina Dauranova; Yekaterina Aydova; Nadezhda Morozova	1:28.72	+2.15
7	4	s	China; Jin Jingzhu; Li Qishi; Han Mei	1:29.42	+2.85
8	2	s	South Korea; Kim Min-sun; Kim Hyun-yung; Lee Na-hyun	1:31.87	+5.30
9	3	c	Norway; Julie Nistad Samsonsen; Martine Ripsrud; Aurora Løvås	1:32.04	+5.47
	3	s	Germany; Katja Franzen; Lea Sophie Scholz; Josephine Heimerl	Did not finish	
