= 2022–23 ISU Speed Skating World Cup – World Cup 6 =

2022—23 ISU Speed Skating World Cup 6
- Venue: Tomaszów Mazowiecki Poland
- Dates: 17 February 2023 — 19 February 2023

The sixth competition weekend of the 2022–23 ISU Speed Skating World Cup will be held at the Ice Arena in Tomaszów Mazowiecki, Poland, from 17 to 19 February 2023.

== Medal summary ==
=== Men's events ===
Event	Gold	Time	Silver	Time	Bronze	Time	Report
500 m	Yuma Murakami; Japan	34.69	Jordan Stolz; United States	34.73	Dai Dai N'tab; Netherlands	34.79	
1000 m	Wesly Dijs; Netherlands	1:08.52; TR	Jordan Stolz; United States	1:08.64	Hein Otterspeer; Netherlands	1:08.72	
1500 m	Jordan Stolz; United States	1:45.44; TR	Kjeld Nuis; Netherlands	1:46.16	Sander Eitrem; Norway	1:46.30	
5000 m	Sander Eitrem; Norway	6:15.06; TR	Beau Snellink; Netherlands	6:21.63	Bart Swings; Belgium	6:22.94	
Mass start^{A}	Bart Hoolwerf; Netherlands	60	Chung Jae-won; South Korea	40	Andrea Giovannini; Italy	23	
Team sprint	Canada; Anders Johnson; Laurent Dubreuil; Antoine Gélinas-Beaulieu	1:19.53	Norway; Bjørn Magnussen; Henrik Fagerli Rukke; Håvard Holmefjord Lorentzen	1:20.89	Netherlands; Stefan Westenbroek; Merijn Scheperkamp; Janno Botman	1:21.61	

^{A} In mass start, race points are accumulated during the race based on results of the intermediate sprints and the final sprint. The skater with most race points is the winner.

=== Women's events ===
Event	Gold	Time	Silver	Time	Bronze	Time	Report
500 m	Vanessa Herzog; Austria	37.96	Kim Min-sun; South Korea	38.08	Jutta Leerdam; Netherlands	38.14	
1000 m	Jutta Leerdam; Netherlands	1:14.94	Kimi Goetz; United States	1:15.54	Miho Takagi; Japan	1:15.67	
1500 m	Ragne Wiklund; Norway	1:56.45	Antoinette Rijpma-de Jong; Netherlands	1:57.39	Miho Takagi; Japan	1:57.59	
3000 m	Ragne Wiklund; Norway	4:02.79; TR	Martina Sábliková; Czech Republic	4:05.67	Joy Beune; Netherlands	4:08.35	
Mass start^{A}	Momoka Horikawa; Japan	62	Valérie Maltais; Canada	43	Ivanie Blondin; Canada	21	
Team sprint	United States; McKenzie Browne; Erin Jackson; Kimi Goetz	1:27.92	Canada; Brooklyn McDougall; Carolina Hiller; Ivanie Blondin	1:28.73	China; Zhang Lina; Jin Jingzhu; Han Mei	1:29.51	

^{A} In mass start, race points are accumulated during the race based on results of the intermediate sprints and the final sprint. The skater with most race points is the winner.

== Results ==
=== Men's events ===
==== 500 m ====
The race started on 18 February at 14:26.

Rank	Pair	Lane	Name	Country	Time	Diff
1st place, gold medalist(s)	10	o	Yuma Murakami	Japan	34.69	
2nd place, silver medalist(s)	9	i	Jordan Stolz	United States	34.73	+0.04
3rd place, bronze medalist(s)	2	i	Dai Dai N'tab	Netherlands	34.79	+0.10
4	10	i	Wataru Morishige	Japan	34.84	+0.15
5	8	o	Merijn Scheperkamp	Netherlands	34.85	+0.16
6	9	o	Laurent Dubreuil	Canada	34.88	+0.19
7	8	i	Takuya Morimoto	Japan	34.93	+0.24
8	3	i	Cha Min-kyu	South Korea	34.99	+0.30
9	5	o	Tatsuya Shinhama	Japan	35.03	+0.34
10	4	o	Håvard Holmefjord Lorentzen	Norway	35.08	+0.39
11	4	i	David Bosa	Italy	35.09	+0.40
12	7	i	Janno Botman	Netherlands	35.13	+0.44
13	1	o	Yevgeniy Koshkin	Kazakhstan	35.16	+0.47
14	6	o	Marek Kania	Poland	35.20	+0.51
15	3	o	Austin Kleba	United States	35.26	+0.57
16	6	i	Damian Żurek	Poland	35.33	+0.64
17	2	o	Bjørn Magnussen	Norway	35.40	+0.71
18	1	i	Stefan Westenbroek	Netherlands	35.44	+0.75
19	7	o	Piotr Michalski	Poland	35.46	+0.77
20	5	i	Christopher Fiola	Canada	35.50	+0.81

==== 1000 m ====
The race started on 19 February at 15:37.

Rank	Pair	Lane	Name	Country	Time	Diff
1st place, gold medalist(s)	2	i	Wesly Dijs	Netherlands	1:08.52; TR	
2nd place, silver medalist(s)	7	i	Jordan Stolz	United States	1:08.64	+0.12
3rd place, bronze medalist(s)	8	i	Hein Otterspeer	Netherlands	1:08.72	+0.20
4	8	o	Thomas Krol	Netherlands	1:08.91	+0.39
5	7	o	Håvard Holmefjord Lorentzen	Norway	1:09.30	+0.78
6	1	o	Tatsuya Shinhama	Japan	1:09.42	+0.90
7	9	i	Kazuya Yamada	Japan	1:09.52	+1.00
8	1	i	Cornelius Kersten	United Kingdom	1:09.55	+1.03
9	6	i	David Bosa	Italy	1:09.65	+1.13
10	9	o	Laurent Dubreuil	Canada	1:09.76	+1.24
11	10	i	Ryota Kojima	Japan	1:09.77	+1.25
12	4	i	Damian Żurek	Poland	1:09.87	+1.35
13	5	o	Marten Liiv	Estonia	1:09.87	+1.35
14	10	o	Antoine Gélinas-Beaulieu	Canada	1:09.89	+1.37
15	4	o	Moritz Klein	Germany	1:09.97	+1.45
16	2	o	Conor McDermott-Mostowy	United States	1:10.26	+1.74
17	3	o	Cooper McLeod	United States	1:10.46	+1.94
18	3	i	Piotr Michalski	Poland	1:10.47	+1.95
19	5	i	Connor Howe	Canada	1:10.53	+2.01
20	6	o	Masaya Yamada	Japan	1:10.86	+2.34

==== 1500 m ====
The race started on 17 February at 17:00.

Rank	Pair	Lane	Name	Country	Time	Diff
1st place, gold medalist(s)	9	o	Jordan Stolz	United States	1:45.44; TR	
2nd place, silver medalist(s)	9	i	Kjeld Nuis	Netherlands	1:46.16	+0.72
3rd place, bronze medalist(s)	8	o	Sander Eitrem	Norway	1:46.30	+0.86
4	8	i	Wesly Dijs	Netherlands	1:46.47	+1.03
5	4	o	Antoine Gélinas-Beaulieu	Canada	1:46.68	+1.24
6	7	o	Bart Swings	Belgium	1:46.87	+1.43
7	7	i	Kazuya Yamada	Japan	1:46.99	+1.55
8	6	i	Thomas Krol	Netherlands	1:47.03	+1.59
9	5	i	Taiyo Nonomura	Japan	1:47.25	+1.81
10	10	o	Ning Zhongyan	China	1:47.31	+1.87
11	2	o	Emery Lehman	United States	1:47.58	+2.14
12	4	i	Tyson Langelaar	Canada	1:47.83	+2.39
13	1	i	Louis Hollaar	Netherlands	1:47.84	+2.40
14	10	i	Connor Howe	Canada	1:48.18	+2.74
15	2	i	Allan Dahl Johansson	Norway	1:48.36	+2.92
16	3	o	Alessio Trentini	Italy	1:48.69	+3.25
17	3	i	Kristian Ulekleiv	Japan	1:49.71	+4.27
18	1	o	Dmitry Morozov	Kazakhstan	1:49.98	+4.54
19	6	o	Masaya Yamada	Japan	1:51.46	+6.02
	5	o	Ryota Kojima	Japan	Did not finish	

==== 5000 m ====
The race started on 18 February at 15:05.

Rank	Pair	Lane	Name	Country	Time	Diff
1st place, gold medalist(s)	6	o	Sander Eitrem	Norway	6:15.06; TR	
2nd place, silver medalist(s)	7	i	Beau Snellink	Netherlands	6:21.63	+6.57
3rd place, bronze medalist(s)	7	o	Bart Swings	Belgium	6:22.94	+7.88
4	4	o	Sigurd Henriksen	Norway	6:25.82	+10.76
5	2	o	Andrea Giovannini	Italy	6:27.75	+12.69
6	4	i	Ryosuke Tsuchiya	Japan	6:28.82	+13.76
7	2	i	Casey Dawson	United States	6:29.11	+14.05
8	1	o	Sverre Lunde Pedersen	Norway	6:29.31	+14.25
9	3	o	Riku Tsuchiya	Japan	6:30.35	+15.29
10	1	i	Kristian Ulekleiv	Norway	6:31.65	+16.59
11	8	i	Kars Jansman	Netherlands	6:31.69	+16.63
12	3	i	Ethan Cepuran	United States	6:32.30	+17.24
13	8	o	Graeme Fish	Canada	6:32.67	+17.61
14	5	o	Seitaro Ichinohe	Japan	6:36.63	+21.57
15	5	i	Hallgeir Engebråten	Norway	7:07.32	+52.26
	6	i	Davide Ghiotto	Italy	Disqualified	

==== Mass start ====
The race started on 19 February at 16:39.

Rank	Name	Country	Points	Time
1st place, gold medalist(s)	Bart Hoolwerf	Netherlands	60	8:19.32
2nd place, silver medalist(s)	Chung Jae-won	South Korea	40	8:19.40
3rd place, bronze medalist(s)	Andrea Giovannini	Italy	23	8:19.50
4	Lee Seung-hoon	South Korea	10	8:19.56
5	Ethan Cepuran	United States	6	8:19.66
6	Allan Dahl Johansson	Norway	3	8:19.85
7	Bart Swings	Belgium	3	8:20.26
8	Timothy Loubineaud	France	3	8:20.61
9	Louis Hollaar	Netherlands	3	8:33.68
10	Shen Hanyang	China	2	8:24.53
11	Daniele Di Stefano	Italy	2	8:52.90
12	Vitaliy Chshigolev	Kazakhstan	1	8:25.67
13	Livio Wenger	Switzerland	1	8:43.23
14	Kota Kikuchi	Japan		8:19.89
15	Gabriel Odor	Austria		8:19.95
16	Felix Rijhnen	Germany		8:23.64
17	Conor McDermott-Mostowy	United States		8:51.84

==== Team sprint ====
The race started on 17 February 2023 at 19:15.

Rank	Pair	Lane	Country	Time	Diff
1st place, gold medalist(s)	3	c	Canada; Anders Johnson; Laurent Dubreuil; Antoine Gélinas-Beaulieu	1:19.53	
2nd place, silver medalist(s)	3	s	Norway; Bjørn Magnussen; Henrik Fagerli Rukke; Håvard Holmefjord Lorentzen	1:20.89	+1.36
3rd place, bronze medalist(s)	5	s	Netherlands; Stefan Westenbroek; Merijn Scheperkamp; Janno Botman	1:21.61	+2.08
4	4	c	Poland; Marek Kania; Piotr Michalski; Damian Żurek	1:22.62	+3.09
5	5	c	United States; Austin Kleba; Cooper McLeod; Conor McDermott-Mostowy	1:22.89	+3.36
6	2	s	Germany; Hendrik Dombek; Moritz Klein; Stefan Emele	1:23.08	+3.55
7	4	s	China; Du Haonan; Wang Shiwei; Ning Zhongyan	1:23.20	+3.67
8	1	c	Finland; Tuukka Suomalainen; Juuso Lehtonen; Samuli Suomalainen	1:23.53	+4.00
9	1	s	Kazakhstan; Alexandr Klenko; Artur Galiyev; Demyan Gavrilov	1:23.66	+4.13
	2	c	Japan; Yuma Murakami; Wataru Morishige; Taiyo Nonomura	Disqualified	

=== Women's events ===
==== 500 m ====
The race started on 17 February at 17:40.

Rank	Pair	Lane	Name	Country	Time	Diff
1st place, gold medalist(s)	9	i	Vanessa Herzog	Austria	37.96	
2nd place, silver medalist(s)	8	i	Kim Min-sun	South Korea	38.08	+0.12
3rd place, bronze medalist(s)	8	o	Jutta Leerdam	Netherlands	38.14	+0.18
4	10	i	Kimi Goetz	United States	38.14	+0.18
5	10	o	Michelle de Jong	Netherlands	38.15	+0.19
6	9	o	Erin Jackson	United States	38.23	+0.27
7	5	o	Kako Yamane	Japan	38.32	+0.36
8	7	i	Marrit Fledderus	Netherlands	38.34	+0.38
9	6	o	Yekaterina Aydova	Kazakhstan	38.35	+0.39
10	7	o	Dione Voskamp	Netherlands	38.38	+0.42
11	1	o	Naomi Verkerk	Netherlands	38.42	+0.46
12	4	o	Carolina Hiller	Canada	38.65	+0.69
13	3	o	Jin Jingzhu	China	38.82	+0.86
14	6	i	Kurumi Inagawa	Japan	38.83	+0.87
15	1	i	Karolina Bosiek	Poland	38.83	+0.87
16	5	i	Konami Soga	Japan	38.85	+0.89
17	4	i	Lee Na-hyun	South Korea	38.92	+0.96
18	3	i	Martine Ripsrud	Norway	39.00	+1.04
19	2	o	Kim Hyun-yung	South Korea	39.17	+1.21
20	2	i	Brooklyn McDougall	Canada	39.30	+1.34

==== 1000 m ====
The race started on 19 February at 15:02.

Rank	Pair	Lane	Name	Country	Time	Diff
1st place, gold medalist(s)	8	i	Jutta Leerdam	Netherlands	1:14.94	
2nd place, silver medalist(s)	10	o	Kimi Goetz	United States	1:15.54	+0.60
3rd place, bronze medalist(s)	9	i	Miho Takagi	Japan	1:15.67	+0.73
4	4	o	Brittany Bowe	United States	1:15.82	+0.88
5	10	i	Vanessa Herzog	Austria	1:16.27	+1.33
6	6	o	Ellia Smeding	United Kingdom	1:16.45	+1.51
7	7	i	Antoinette Rijpma-de Jong	Netherlands	1:16.55	+1.61
8	6	i	Yekaterina Aydova	Kazakhstan	1:16.63	+1.69
9	9	o	Isabel Grevelt	Netherlands	1:17.27	+2.33
10	5	i	Karolina Bosiek	Poland	1:17.56	+2.62
11	2	i	Han Mei	China	1:17.68	+2.74
12	2	o	Naomi Verkerk	Netherlands	1:17.76	+2.82
13	7	o	Ivanie Blondin	Canada	1:17.95	+3.01
14	1	i	Maddison Pearman	Canada	1:18.20	+3.26
15	8	o	Kim Min-sun	South Korea	1:18.26	+3.32
16	4	i	Kim Hyun-yung	South Korea	1:18.55	+3.61
17	3	o	Martine Ripsrud	Norway	1:19.04	+4.10
18	5	o	Kako Yamane	Japan	1:19.18	+4.24
19	1	o	Jin Jingzhu	China	1:19.82	+4.88
19	3	i	Sumire Kikuchi	Japan	1:19.82	+4.88

==== 1500 m ====
The race started on 18 February at 13:45.

Rank	Pair	Lane	Name	Country	Time	Diff
1st place, gold medalist(s)	8	o	Ragne Wiklund	Norway	1:56.45	
2nd place, silver medalist(s)	8	i	Antoinette Rijpma-de Jong	Netherlands	1:57.39	+0.94
3rd place, bronze medalist(s)	9	i	Miho Takagi	Japan	1:57.59	+1.14
4	10	i	Joy Beune	Netherlands	1:57.62	+1.17
5	7	o	Kimi Goetz	United States	1:57.98	+1.53
6	7	i	Ayano Sato	Japan	1:57.98	+1.53
7	10	o	Ivanie Blondin	Canada	1:58.62	+2.17
8	2	o	Brittany Bowe	United States	1:58.99	+2.54
9	4	i	Reina Anema	Netherlands	1:59.36	+2.91
10	5	i	Han Mei	China	1:59.39	+2.94
11	9	o	Nadezhda Morozova	Kazakhstan	1:59.90	+3.45
12	2	i	Mia Kilburg	United States	2:00.77	+4.32
13	5	o	Yuna Onodera	Japan	2:00.95	+4.50
14	6	i	Yekaterina Aydova	Kazakhstan	2:00.98	+4.53
15	4	o	Karolina Bosiek	Poland	2:01.16	+4.71
16	3	o	Kaitlyn McGregor	Switzerland	2:01.65	+5.20
17	1	o	Maddison Pearman	Canada	2:01.66	+5.21
18	6	o	Béatrice Lamarche	Canada	2:02.26	+5.81
19	3	i	Alexa Scott	Canada	2:03.17	+6.72
20	1	i	Park Ji-woo	South Korea	2:05.62	+9.17

==== 3000 m ====
The race started on 17 February at 18:19.

Rank	Pair	Lane	Name	Country	Time	Diff
1st place, gold medalist(s)	8	i	Ragne Wiklund	Norway	4:02.79; TR	
2nd place, silver medalist(s)	6	i	Martina Sábliková	Czech Republic	4:05.67	+2.88
3rd place, bronze medalist(s)	6	o	Joy Beune	Netherlands	4:08.35	+5.56
4	8	o	Isabelle Weidemann	Canada	4:09.11	+6.32
5	7	o	Ivanie Blondin	Canada	4:09.36	+6.57
6	7	i	Valérie Maltais	Canada	4:10.77	+7.98
7	4	o	Han Mei	China	4:11.08	+8.29
8	5	i	Ayano Sato	Japan	4:11.96	+9.17
9	3	i	Antoinette Rijpma-de Jong	Netherlands	4:12.30	+9.51
10	1	i	Robin Groot	Netherlands	4:13.26	+10.47
11	4	i	Magdalena Czyszczoń	Poland	4:13.70	+10.91
12	2	o	Reina Anema	Netherlands	4:14.84	+12.05
13	5	o	Nadezhda Morozova	Kazakhstan	4:17.47	+14.68
14	1	o	Abigail McCluskey	Canada	4:18.37	+15.58
15	2	i	Yang Binyu	China	4:22.64	+19.85
16	3	o	Josie Hofmann	Germany	4:28.19	+25.40

==== Mass start ====
The race started on 19 February at 16:20.

Rank	Name	Country	Points	Time
1st place, gold medalist(s)	Momoka Horikawa	Japan	62	8:58.39
2nd place, silver medalist(s)	Valérie Maltais	Canada	43	8:58.56
3rd place, bronze medalist(s)	Ivanie Blondin	Canada	21	9:03.51
4	Laura Peveri	Italy	10	9:03.61
5	Mia Kilburg	United States	6	9:03.65
6	Sandrine Tas	Belgium	4	9:09.58
7	Robin Groot	Netherlands	3	9:03.69
8	Park Ji-woo	South Korea	3	9:12.83
9	Michelle Uhrig	Germany	2	9:04.56
10	Magdalena Czyszczoń	Poland	2	9:07.51
11	Giorgia Birkeland	United States	1	9:21.59
12	Elisa Dul	Netherlands		9:03.85
13	Chen Aoyu	China		9:04.40
14	Sumire Kikuchi	Japan		9:04.78
15	Hwang Hyun-sung	South Korea		9:06.05
16	Olga Kaczmarek	Poland		9:16.59

==== Team sprint ====
The race started on 18 February 2023 at 16:19.

Rank	Pair	Lane	Country	Time	Diff
1st place, gold medalist(s)	4	s	United States; McKenzie Browne; Erin Jackson; Kimi Goetz	1:27.92	
2nd place, silver medalist(s)	4	c	Canada; Brooklyn McDougall; Carolina Hiller; Ivanie Blondin	1:28.73	+0.81
3rd place, bronze medalist(s)	2	s	China; Zhang Lina; Jin Jingzhu; Han Mei	1:29.51	+1.59
4	2	c	Poland; Martyna Baran; Iga Wojtasik; Karolina Bosiek	1:31.77	+3.85
5	3	c	Japan; Konami Soga; Kurumi Inagawa; Suzune Usami	1:32.90	+4.98
6	1	c	Germany; Katja Franzen; Anna Ostlender; Lea Sophie Scholz	1:32.94	+5.02
	3	s	Netherlands; Michelle de Jong; Marrit Fledderus; Isabel Grevelt	Did not finish	
