= 2022–23 ISU Speed Skating World Cup – World Cup 5 =

International speed skating competition

2022–23 ISU Speed Skating World Cup 5
- Venue: Tomaszów Mazowiecki Poland
- Dates: 10 February 2023 — 12 February 2023

The fifth competition weekend of the 2022–23 ISU Speed Skating World Cup was held at the Ice Arena in Tomaszów Mazowiecki, Poland, from Friday, 10 February, until Sunday, 12 February 2023.

== Medal summary ==
=== Men's events ===
Event	Gold	Time	Silver	Time	Bronze	Time	Report
500 m	Wataru Morishige; Japan	34.78	Laurent Dubreuil; Canada	34.87	Yuma Murakami; Japan	35.03	
1000 m	Hein Otterspeer; Netherlands	1:09.24	Kjeld Nuis; Netherlands	1:09.52	Damian Żurek; Poland	1:09.85	
1500 m	Kjeld Nuis; Netherlands	1:46.71	Peder Kongshaug; Norway	1:47.41	Patrick Roest; Netherlands	1:47.62	
5000 m	Davide Ghiotto; Italy	6:17.45	Patrick Roest; Netherlands	6:18.27	Sander Eitrem; Norway	6:18.45	
Mass start^{A}	Bart Swings; Belgium	61	Andrea Giovannini; Italy	40	Livio Wenger; Switzerland	20	
Team pursuit	Norway; Peder Kongshaug; Sander Eitrem; Sverre Lunde Pedersen	3:42.70	United States; Ethan Cepuran; Emery Lehman; Casey Dawson	3:42.75	Netherlands; Patrick Roest; Marcel Bosker; Beau Snellink	3:43.96	

^{A} In mass start, race points are accumulated during the race based on results of the intermediate sprints and the final sprint. The skater with most race points is the winner.

=== Women's events ===
Event	Gold	Time	Silver	Time	Bronze	Time	Report
500 m	Kim Min-sun; South Korea	37.90	Vanessa Herzog; Austria	38.09	Kimi Goetz; United States	38.11	
1000 m	Kimi Goetz; United States	1:16.00	Miho Takagi; Japan	1:16.18	Brittany Bowe; United States	1:16.43	
1500 m	Marijke Groenewoud; Netherlands	1:56.67	Ragne Wiklund; Norway	1:57.83	Miho Takagi; Japan	1:58.02	
3000 m	Ragne Wiklund; Norway	4:05.96	Martina Sábliková; Czech Republic	4:06.04	Marijke Groenewoud; Netherlands	4:07.18	
Mass start^{A}	Marijke Groenewoud; Netherlands	60	Ivanie Blondin; Canada	40	Mia Kilburg; United States	21	
Team pursuit	Canada; Ivanie Blondin; Isabelle Weidemann; Valérie Maltais	3:00.97	Netherlands; Joy Beune; Elisa Dul; Robin Groot	3:01.74	United States; Mia Kilburg; Giorgia Birkeland; Brittany Bowe	3:04.01	

^{A} In mass start, race points are accumulated during the race based on results of the intermediate sprints and the final sprint. The skater with most race points is the winner.

== Results ==
=== Men's events ===
==== 500 m ====
The race started on 11 February at 15:41.

Rank	Pair	Lane	Name	Country	Time	Diff
1st place, gold medalist(s)	9	o	Wataru Morishige	Japan	34.78	
2nd place, silver medalist(s)	10	i	Laurent Dubreuil	Canada	34.87	+0.09
3rd place, bronze medalist(s)	10	o	Yuma Murakami	Japan	35.03	+0.25
4	1	o	Hein Otterspeer	Netherlands	35.03	+0.25
5	4	o	Tatsuya Shinhama	Japan	35.09	+0.31
6	8	o	Takuya Morimoto	Japan	35.15	+0.37
7	5	i	Damian Żurek	Poland	35.23	+0.45
8	9	i	Janno Botman	Netherlands	35.25	+0.47
9	2	o	Ryota Kojima	Japan	35.28	+0.50
10	8	i	Kim Jun-ho	South Korea	35.30	+0.52
11	6	o	Marek Kania	Poland	35.32	+0.54
12	5	o	Cha Min-kyu	South Korea	35.33	+0.55
13	7	o	Piotr Michalski	Poland	35.35	+0.57
14	4	i	Håvard Holmefjord Lorentzen	Norway	35.42	+0.64
15	3	o	Yevgeniy Koshkin	Kazakhstan	35.45	+0.67
16	6	i	David Bosa	Italy	35.54	+0.76
17	1	i	Marten Liiv	Estonia	35.57	+0.79
18	2	i	Nil Llop	Spain	35.65	+0.87
19	7	i	Christopher Fiola	Canada	35.72	+0.94
20	3	i	Kim Cheol-min	South Korea	35.76	+0.98

==== 1000 m ====
The race started on 12 February at 16:52.

Rank	Pair	Lane	Name	Country	Time	Diff
1st place, gold medalist(s)	8	o	Hein Otterspeer	Netherlands	1:09.24	
2nd place, silver medalist(s)	2	o	Kjeld Nuis	Netherlands	1:09.52	+0.28
3rd place, bronze medalist(s)	4	o	Damian Żurek	Poland	1:09.85	+0.61
4	8	i	Antoine Gélinas-Beaulieu	Canada	1:09.91	+0.67
5	9	i	Kazuya Yamada	Japan	1:09.97	+0.73
6	4	i	Håvard Holmefjord Lorentzen	Norway	1:10.04	+0.80
7	5	i	David Bosa	Italy	1:10.08	+0.84
8	10	o	Ryota Kojima	Japan	1:10.13	+0.89
9	5	o	Masaya Yamada	Japan	1:10.18	+0.94
10	10	i	Laurent Dubreuil	Canada	1:10.29	+1.05
11	6	o	Ning Zhongyan	China	1:10.30	+1.06
12	1	i	Cornelius Kersten	United Kingdom	1:10.33	+1.09
13	9	o	Joep Wennemars	Netherlands	1:10.45	+1.21
14	6	i	Connor Howe	Canada	1:10.67	+1.43
15	3	i	Cooper McLeod	United States	1:10.77	+1.53
16	7	i	Marten Liiv	Estonia	1:10.78	+1.54
17	2	i	Lian Ziwen	China	1:10.84	+1.60
18	3	o	Piotr Michalski	Poland	1:10.89	+1.65
19	7	o	Moritz Klein	Germany	1:11.05	+1.81
20	1	o	Vincent De Haître	Canada	1:11.69	+2.45

==== 1500 m ====
The race started on 10 February at 17:00.

Rank	Pair	Lane	Name	Country	Time	Diff
1st place, gold medalist(s)	9	i	Kjeld Nuis	Netherlands	1:46.71	
2nd place, silver medalist(s)	7	o	Peder Kongshaug	Norway	1:47.41	+0.70
3rd place, bronze medalist(s)	8	i	Patrick Roest	Netherlands	1:47.62	+0.91
4	8	o	Connor Howe	Canada	1:47.81	+1.10
5	9	o	Wesly Dijs	Netherlands	1:47.85	+1.14
6	7	i	Kazuya Yamada	Japan	1:48.08	+1.37
7	3	o	Antoine Gélinas-Beaulieu	Canada	1:48.27	+1.56
8	5	i	Taiyo Nonomura	Japan	1:48.36	+1.65
9	5	o	Tyson Langelaar	Canada	1:48.55	+1.84
10	10	o	Ning Zhongyan	China	1:48.56	+1.85
11	6	i	Bart Swings	Belgium	1:48.81	+2.10
12	6	o	Masaya Yamada	Japan	1:49.00	+2.29
13	4	o	Kristian Ulekleiv	Norway	1:49.22	+2.51
14	4	i	Ryota Kojima	Japan	1:49.57	+2.86
15	10	i	Sander Eitrem	Norway	1:49.83	+3.12
16	3	i	Alessio Trentini	Italy	1:49.96	+3.25
17	2	i	Dmitry Morozov	Kazakhstan	1:50.16	+3.45
18	1	o	Gabriel Odor	Austria	1:50.47	+3.76
19	2	o	Moritz Klein	Germany	1:50.77	+4.06
20	1	i	Seitaro Ichinohe	Japan	1:57.36	+10.65

==== 5000 m ====
The race started on 11 February at 16:20.

Rank	Pair	Lane	Name	Country	Time	Diff
1st place, gold medalist(s)	6	i	Davide Ghiotto	Italy	6:17.45	
2nd place, silver medalist(s)	6	o	Patrick Roest	Netherlands	6:18.27	+0.82
3rd place, bronze medalist(s)	7	o	Sander Eitrem	Norway	6:18.45	+1.00
4	8	o	Beau Snellink	Netherlands	6:25.07	+7.62
5	7	i	Bart Swings	Belgium	6:25.47	+8.02
6	3	o	Marcel Bosker	Netherlands	6:28.25	+10.80
7	8	i	Kars Jansman	Netherlands	6:29.56	+12.11
8	1	o	Ted-Jan Bloemen	Canada	6:29.90	+12.45
9	1	i	Riku Tsuchiya	Japan	6:31.23	+13.78
10	4	i	Hallgeir Engebråten	Norway	6:31.48	+14.03
11	2	i	Ethan Cepuran	United States	6:32.58	+15.13
12	5	i	Graeme Fish	Canada	6:33.84	+16.39
13	2	o	Casey Dawson	United States	6:34.71	+17.26
14	4	o	Ryosuke Tsuchiya	Japan	6:39.76	+22.31
15	5	o	Seitaro Ichinohe	Japan	6:57.32	+39.87
	3	i	Felix Rijhnen	Germany	Disqualified	

==== Mass start ====
The race started on 12 February at 17:54.

Rank	Name	Country	Points	Time
1st place, gold medalist(s)	Bart Swings	Belgium	61	8:12.17
2nd place, silver medalist(s)	Andrea Giovannini	Italy	40	8:12.19
3rd place, bronze medalist(s)	Livio Wenger	Switzerland	20	8:12.26
4	Ethan Cepuran	United States	10	8:12.42
5	Louis Hollaar	Netherlands	8	8:33.94
6	Chung Jae-won	South Korea	6	8:12.43
7	Philip Due Schmidt	Denmark	4	8:17.95
8	Bart Hoolwerf	Netherlands	3	8:12.63
9	Gabriel Odor	Austria	3	8:13.78
10	Daniele Di Stefano	Italy	1	8:13.93
11	Conor McDermot-Mostowy	United States	1	8:18.18
12	Lee Seung-hoon	South Korea		8:13.00
13	Kota Kikuchi	Japan		8:13.07
14	Connor Howe	Canada		8:13.36
15	Artur Janicki	Poland		8:14.90
16	Kristian Ulekleiv	Norway		8:55.60

==== Team pursuit ====
The race started on 10 February at 19:15.

Rank	Pair	Lane	Country	Time	Diff
1st place, gold medalist(s)	3	s	Norway; Peder Kongshaug; Sander Eitrem; Sverre Lunde Pedersen	3:42.70	
2nd place, silver medalist(s)	2	c	United States; Ethan Cepuran; Emery Lehman; Casey Dawson	3:42.75	+0.05
3rd place, bronze medalist(s)	2	s	Netherlands; Patrick Roest; Marcel Bosker; Beau Snellink; Wesly Dijs	3:43.96	+1.26
4	3	c	Canada; Connor Howe; Antoine Gélinas-Beaulieu; Hayden Mayeur	3:45.91	+3.21
5	1	s	Italy; Daniele Di Stefano; Davide Ghiotto; Andrea Giovannini	3:48.08	+5.38
6	1	c	Poland; Marcin Bachanek; Artur Janicki; Szymon Palka	3:56.04	+13.34

=== Women's events ===
==== 500 m ====
The race started on 10 February at 17:40.

Rank	Pair	Lane	Name	Country	Time	Diff
1st place, gold medalist(s)	9	i	Kim Min-sun	South Korea	37.90	
2nd place, silver medalist(s)	9	o	Vanessa Herzog	Austria	38.09	+0.19
3rd place, bronze medalist(s)	7	o	Kimi Goetz	United States	38.11	+0.21
4	6	o	Miho Takagi	Japan	38.20	+0.30
5	10	i	Erin Jackson	United States	38.23	+0.33
6	7	i	Michelle de Jong	Netherlands	38.54	+0.64
7	8	i	Femke Kok	Netherlands	38.60	+0.70
8	8	o	Marrit Fledderus	Netherlands	38.63	+0.73
9	6	i	Dione Voskamp	Netherlands	38.67	+0.77
10	5	o	Yekaterina Aydova	Kazakhstan	38.71	+0.81
11	3	i	Lee Na-hyun	South Korea	38.88	+0.98
12	4	i	Kako Yamane	Japan	38.96	+1.06
13	4	o	Carolina Hiller	Canada	39.00	+1.10
14	5	i	Konami Soga	Japan	39.01	+1.11
15	2	o	Martine Ripsrud	Norway	39.12	+1.22
16	10	o	Kurumi Inagawa	Japan	39.14	+1.24
17	1	o	Suzune Usami	Japan	39.24	+1.34
18	1	i	Brooklyn McDougall	Canada	39.33	+1.43
19	2	i	Li Qishi	China	39.34	+1.44
20	3	o	Jin Jingzhu	China	52.66	+14.76

==== 1000 m ====
The race started on 12 February at 16:17.

Rank	Pair	Lane	Name	Country	Time	Diff
1st place, gold medalist(s)	10	o	Kimi Goetz	United States	1:16.00	
2nd place, silver medalist(s)	10	i	Miho Takagi	Japan	1:16.18	+0.18
3rd place, bronze medalist(s)	3	i	Brittany Bowe	United States	1:16.43	+0.43
4	9	o	Vanessa Herzog	Austria	1:16.90	+0.90
5	8	o	Kim Min-sun	South Korea	1:17.10	+1.10
6	9	i	Isabel Grevelt	Netherlands	1:17.23	+1.23
7	7	o	Michelle de Jong	Netherlands	1:17.55	+1.55
8	4	i	Ellia Smeding	United Kingdom	1:17.56	+1.56
9	7	i	Yekaterina Aydova	Kazakhstan	1:17.75	+1.75
10	8	i	Marrit Fledderus	Netherlands	1:18.13	+2.13
11	6	o	Ivanie Blondin	Canada	1:18.21	+2.21
12	5	o	Karolina Bosiek	Poland	1:18.51	+2.51
13	2	i	Isabelle van Elst	Belgium	1:18.71	+2.71
14	1	o	Femke Kok	Netherlands	1:18.79	+2.79
15	4	o	Kako Yamane	Japan	1:19.05	+3.05
16	5	i	Kim Hyun-yung	South Korea	1:19.15	+3.15
17	6	i	Erin Jackson	United States	1:19.90	+3.90
18	3	o	Sumire Kikuchi	Japan	1:20.16	+4.16
19	2	o	Kaitlyn McGregor	Switzerland	1:20.83	+4.83

==== 1500 m ====
The race started on 11 February at 15:00.

Rank	Pair	Lane	Name	Country	Time	Diff
1st place, gold medalist(s)	8	o	Marijke Groenewoud	Netherlands	1:56.67	
2nd place, silver medalist(s)	9	i	Ragne Wiklund	Norway	1:57.83	+1.16
3rd place, bronze medalist(s)	8	i	Miho Takagi	Japan	1:58.02	+1.35
4	7	i	Ayano Sato	Japan	1:58.69	+2.02
5	10	o	Joy Beune	Netherlands	1:58.98	+2.31
6	6	i	Kimi Goetz	United States	1:59.19	+2.52
7	10	i	Ivanie Blondin	Canada	1:59.92	+3.25
8	7	o	Li Qishi	China	2:00.46	+3.79
9	4	i	Han Mei	China	2:00.65	+3.98
10	3	i	Reina Anema	Netherlands	2:00.91	+4.24
11	9	o	Nadezhda Morozova	Kazakhstan	2:01.18	+4.51
12	6	o	Yekaterina Aydova	Kazakhstan	2:01.76	+5.09
13	4	o	Karolina Bosiek	Poland	2:02.24	+5.57
14	1	i	Ellia Smeding	United Kingdom	2:02.33	+5.66
15	1	o	Mia Kilburg	United States	2:02.34	+5.67
16	5	o	Yuna Onodera	Japan	2:02.74	+6.07
17	5	i	Béatrice Lamarche	Canada	2:03.51	+6.84
18	2	o	Kaitlyn McGregor	Switzerland	2:03.58	+6.91
19	2	i	Alexa Scott	Canada	2:05.05	+8.38
20	3	o	Sandrine Tas	Belgium	2:06.14	+9.47

==== 3000 m ====
The race started on 10 February at 18:19.

Rank	Pair	Lane	Name	Country	Time	Diff
1st place, gold medalist(s)	8	o	Ragne Wiklund	Norway	4:05.96	
2nd place, silver medalist(s)	4	i	Martina Sábliková	Czech Republic	4:06.04	+0.08
3rd place, bronze medalist(s)	7	o	Marijke Groenewoud	Netherlands	4:07.18	+1.22
4	6	i	Joy Beune	Netherlands	4:07.68	+1.72
5	8	i	Isabelle Weidemann	Canada	4:08.91	+2.95
6	1	o	Sanne In 't Hof	Netherlands	4:11.18	+5.22
7	7	i	Valérie Maltais	Canada	4:11.25	+5.29
8	6	o	Ivanie Blondin	Canada	4:13.16	+7.20
9	5	i	Ayano Sato	Japan	4:13.99	+8.03
10	3	i	Han Mei	China	4:15.99	+10.03
11	4	o	Magdalena Czyszczoń	Poland	4:20.02	+14.06
12	2	o	Sofie Karoline Haugen	Norway	4:20.21	+14.25
13	2	i	Yang Binyu	China	4:22.56	+16.60
14	5	o	Nadezhda Morozova	Kazakhstan	4:22.91	+16.95
15	3	o	Josie Hofmann	Germany	4:23.76	+17.80
16	1	i	Claudia Pechstein	Germany	4:29.89	+23.93

==== Mass start ====
The race started on 12 February at 17:35.

Rank	Name	Country	Points	Time
1st place, gold medalist(s)	Marijke Groenewoud	Netherlands	60	9:34.23
2nd place, silver medalist(s)	Ivanie Blondin	Canada	40	9:34.47
3rd place, bronze medalist(s)	Mia Kilburg	United States	21	9:34.61
4	Laura Peveri	Italy	12	9:34.64
5	Elisa Dul	Netherlands	7	9:35.02
6	Yang Binyu	China	6	9:35.00
7	Sandrine Tas	Belgium	3	9:37.93
8	Kaitlyn McGregor	Switzerland	3	9:38.88
9	Magdalena Czyszczoń	Poland	3	9:38.91
10	Claudia Pechstein	Germany	2	9:52.86
11	Valérie Maltais	Canada		9:35.10
12	Sumire Kikuchi	Japan		9:35.12
13	Hwang Hyun-sun	South Korea		9:35.51
14	Karolina Bosiek	Poland		9:35.74
15	Park Ji-woo	South Korea		9:35.87
16	Michelle Uhrig	Germany		9:37.86

==== Team pursuit ====
The race started on 11 February at 17:34.

Rank	Pair	Lane	Country	Time	Diff
1st place, gold medalist(s)	4	s	Canada; Ivanie Blondin; Isabelle Weidemann; Valérie Maltais	3:00.97	
2nd place, silver medalist(s)	3	s	Netherlands; Joy Beune; Elisa Dul; Robin Groot	3:01.74	+0.77
3rd place, bronze medalist(s)	3	c	United States; Mia Kilburg; Giorgia Birkeland; Brittany Bowe	3:04.01	+3.04
4	4	c	Japan; Yuna Onodera; Ayano Sato; Sumire Kikuchi	3:07.32	+6.35
5	2	s	Poland; Karolina Bosiek; Magdalena Czyszczoń; Olga Kaczmarek	3:07.60	+6.63
6	1	c	Switzerland; Kaitlyn McGregor; Ramone Härdi; Vera Güntert	3:09.48	+8.51
7	2	c	Germany; Michelle Uhrig; Josie Hofmann; Lea Sophie Scholz	3:10.95	+9.98
8	1	s	China; Han Mei; Li Qishi; Yang Binyu	3:12.41	+11.44
