= 2019 World Single Distances Speed Skating Championships – Women's 500 metres =

Women's 500 metres at the 2019 World Single Distances Speed Skating Championships
- Venue: Max Aicher Arena
- Location: Inzell, Germany
- Dates: 8 February
- Competitors: 24 from 12 nations
- Winning time: 37.12

Medalists
gold medal	Vanessa Herzog	Austria
silver medal	Nao Kodaira	Japan
bronze medal	Konami Soga	Japan

The Women's 500 metres competition at the 2019 World Single Distances Speed Skating Championships was held on 8 February 2019.

== Results ==
The race was started at 16:15.

Rank	Pair	Lane	Name	Country	Time	Diff
1st place, gold medalist(s)	10	o	Vanessa Herzog	Austria	37.12	
2nd place, silver medalist(s)	12	o	Nao Kodaira	Japan	37.20	+0.08
3rd place, bronze medalist(s)	8	o	Konami Soga	Japan	37.60	+0.48
4	11	i	Angelina Golikova	Russia	37.69	+0.57
5	12	i	Olga Fatkulina	Russia	37.76	+0.64
6	10	i	Brittany Bowe	United States	37.77	+0.65
7	8	i	Maki Tsuji	Japan	37.85	+0.73
8	11	o	Daria Kachanova	Russia	37.89	+0.77
9	2	i	Yekaterina Aydova	Kazakhstan	38.03	+0.91
10	4	i	Heather McLean	Canada	38.05	+0.93
11	3	i	Kaja Ziomek	Poland	38.09	+0.97
12	9	i	Kim Hyun-yung	South Korea	38.130	+1.01
13	1	i	Letitia de Jong	Netherlands	38.135	+1.01
14	4	o	Kaylin Irvine	Canada	38.16	+1.04
15	5	o	Erin Jackson	United States	38.32	+1.20
16	7	o	Jutta Leerdam	Netherlands	38.34	+1.22
17	9	o	Kim Min-sun	South Korea	38.40	+1.28
18	3	o	Tian Ruining	China	38.41	+1.29
19	5	i	Hege Bøkko	Norway	38.47	+1.35
20	6	i	Marsha Hudey	Canada	38.54	+1.42
21	6	o	Janine Smit	Netherlands	38.60	+1.48
22	7	i	Jin Jingzhu	China	38.62	+1.50
23	1	o	Li Qishi	China	38.68	+1.56
24	2	o	Gabriele Hirschbichler	Germany	38.88	+1.76
