= McKenzie Browne =

American speed skater

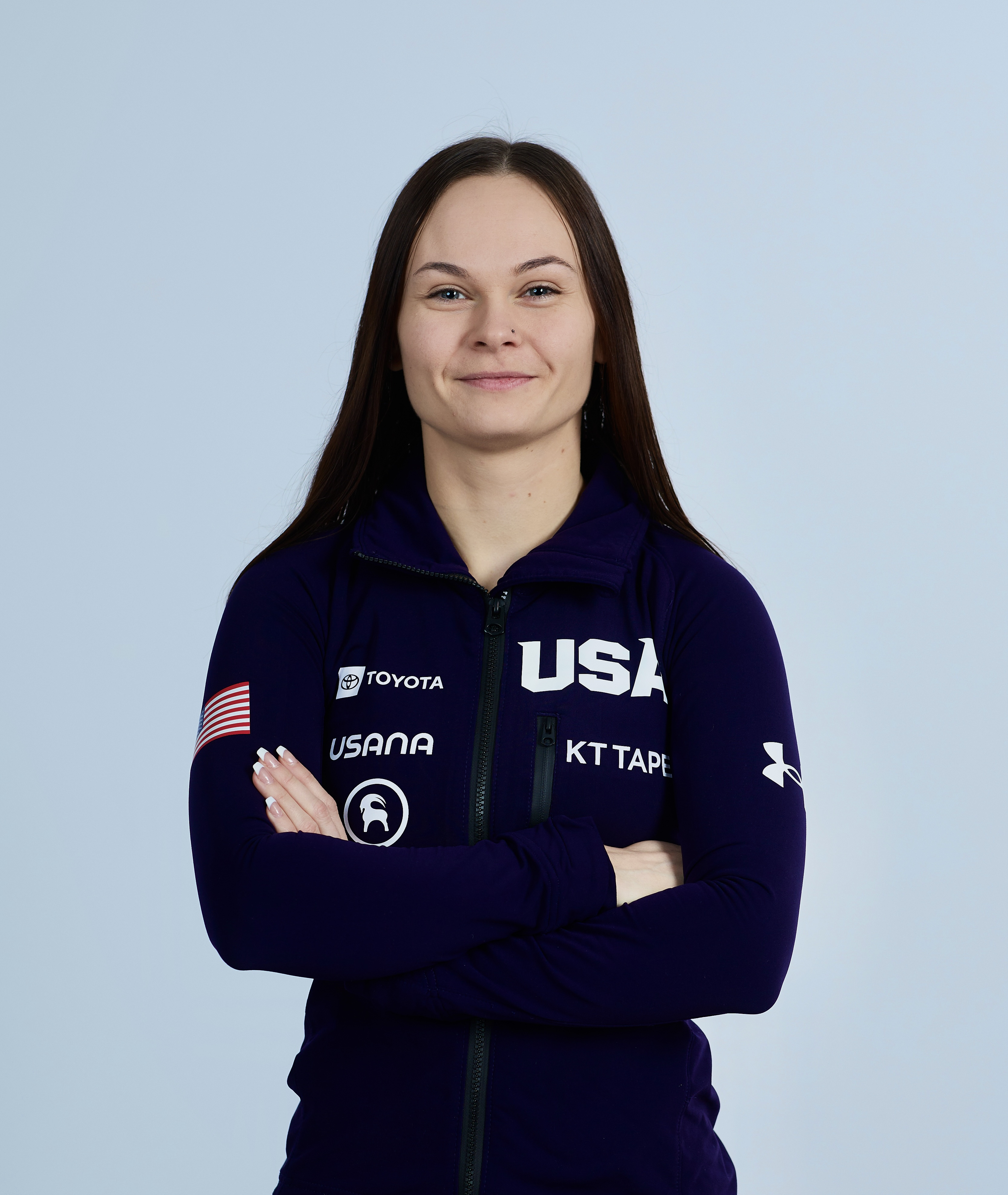

Personal information
- Nationality: United States
- Born: September 12, 1995 (age 30) Allentown, Pennsylvania, U.S.

Sport
- Country: United States
- Sport: Speed skating
Medal record
Women's speed skating
Representing the United States
World Single Distances Championships
Silver medal – second place	2023 Heerenveen	Team sprint
Four Continents Championships
Gold medal – first place	2022 Calgary	Team sprint

McKenzie Browne (born September 12, 1995) is an American speed skater.

== Early life ==
Browne began her career as an inline speed skater at Bethlehem Skateaway in 2003 and has since won 20 national titles and competed at the Inline Speedskating World Championships eight times. While in college, she competed in track cycling and was named the 2015 Collegiate National Sprint Champion while competing for Penn State Lehigh Valley. At the 2016 USA Cycling National Track Championships, she won a silver medal in the team sprint and two bronze medals in the women's sprint and 500-meter time trial events.

She then transitioned to the ice when she saw several of her inline skating friends make the Olympic Team in 2018. After graduating in 2019 with a bachelor's degree in communications from Kutztown University of Pennsylvania, she moved to Salt Lake City, Utah to begin her speed skating career.

== Speed skating career ==
Browne competed at the 2022 U.S. Olympic Trials in long-track speed skating. She placed sixth in the 500 meter and eighth in the 1000 meter distances.

Browne represented the United States at the Four Continents Speed Skating Championships and won a gold medal in the team sprint. The team finished with a then American record time of 1:30.47.

On November 19, 2022, during the second event of the 2022–23 ISU Speed Skating World Cup, Browne won a bronze medal in the team sprint event with an American record time of 1:27.72. On December 17, 2022, during the fourth event of the 2022–23 ISU Speed Skating World Cup, Browne won a gold medal in the team sprint with an American record time of 1:25.68. On February 18, 2023, during the sixth event of the 2022–23 ISU Speed Skating World Cup, Browne won another gold medal in the team sprint. On the same day, she won the World Cup season title in the women's team sprint along with Kimi Goetz and Erin Jackson.

At the 2023 World Single Distances Speed Skating Championships, Browne won the silver medal with her teammates Kimi Goetz and Erin Jackson. She also placed 21st in the 500m distance.
