= 2024 World Single Distances Speed Skating Championships – Women's 500 metres =

Women's 500 metres at the 2024 World Single Distances Speed Skating Championships
- Venue: Olympic Oval
- Location: Calgary, Canada
- Dates: February 16
- Competitors: 24 from 13 nations
- Winning time: 36.83

Medalists
gold medal	Femke Kok	Netherlands
silver medal	Kim Min-sun	South Korea
bronze medal	Kimi Goetz	United States

The Women's 500 metres competition at the 2024 World Single Distances Speed Skating Championships was held on February 16, 2024.

== Results ==
The race was started at 13:42.

Rank	Pair	Lane	Name	Country	Time	Diff
1st place, gold medalist(s)	12	o	Femke Kok	Netherlands	36.83	
2nd place, silver medalist(s)	11	o	Kim Min-sun	South Korea	37.19	+0.36
3rd place, bronze medalist(s)	12	i	Kimi Goetz	United States	37.21	+0.38
4	7	o	Tian Ruining	China	37.24	+0.41
5	10	i	Erin Jackson	United States	37.25	+0.42
6	5	i	Jutta Leerdam	Netherlands	37.42	+0.59
7	9	i	Lee Na-hyun	South Korea	37.49	+0.66
8	10	o	Marrit Fledderus	Netherlands	37.614	+0.78
9	9	o	Andżelika Wójcik	Poland	37.617	+0.78
10	11	i	Kurumi Inagawa	Japan	37.68	+0.85
11	6	o	Vanessa Herzog	Austria	37.69	+0.86
12	5	o	Serena Pergher	Italy	37.80	+0.97
13	8	o	Yukino Yoshida	Japan	38.10	+1.27
14	6	i	Karolina Bosiek	Poland	38.15	+1.32
15	7	i	Rio Yamada	Japan	38.19	+1.36
16	4	o	Martyna Baran	Poland	38.21	+1.38
17	4	i	Pei Chong	China	38.24	+1.41
18	3	o	Martine Ripsrud	Norway	38.293	+1.46
19	3	i	Yekaterina Aydova	Kazakhstan	38.299	+1.46
20	8	i	Carolina Hiller	Canada	38.30	+1.47
21	1	i	Ellia Smeding	Great Britain	38.65	+1.82
22	1	o	Chen Ying-chu	Chinese Taipei	38.69	+1.86
23	2	o	Heather Carruthers	Canada	38.71	+1.88
24	2	i	Kim Min-ji	South Korea	41.00	+4.17
