= 2011 World Junior Short Track Speed Skating Championships – Women's 3000 metre relay =

The Women's 3000 metre relay at the 2011 World Junior Short Track Speed Skating Championships will begin on 25 February, and are scheduled to end on 27 February at the Forum Sport Center ice rink.

== Results ==
Top 2 Relays from each heat and the next 2 fastest thirds qualify for Semifinals.

Heat 1

| Rank | Country | Athlete | Time | Notes |
|---|---|---|---|---|
| 1 | Italy | Arianna Valcepina; Martina Valcepina; Elena Viviani | 4:28.192 | Q |
| 2 | Canada | Laurie Marceau; Cynthia Mascitto; Ann Veronique Michaud | 4:28.767 | Q |
| 3 | Hungary | Veronika Denes; Zsofia Konya; Patricia Toth | 4:31.182 | Q |

Heat 3

| Rank | Country | Athlete | Time | Notes |
|---|---|---|---|---|
| 1 | South Korea | Se Jung Ahn; Hee Jung Cheon; Do Hee Noh | 4:31.192 | Q |
| 2 | United States | Lexi Burkholder; Katherine Ralston; Rachel Stewart | 4:40.718 | Q |
| 3 | Bulgaria | Rumiana Dimitrova; Lilia Dzhustrova; Zornica Pencheva | | DSQ |

Heat 2

| Rank | Country | Athlete | Time | Notes |
|---|---|---|---|---|
| 1 | China | Meng Lin; Jin Jingzhu; Han Xiao | 4:22.827 | Q |
| 2 | Japan | Moemi Kikuchi; Fumi Kitabuki; Izumi Nishii | 4:36.480 | Q |
| 3 | Russia | Ekaterina Baranok; Elvira Bayazitova; Evgeniya Zakharova | 4:52.749 | Q |
