= 2023 World Single Distances Speed Skating Championships – Women's team sprint =

Women's team sprint at the 2023 World Single Distances Speed Skating Championships
- Venue: Thialf
- Location: Heerenveen, Netherlands
- Dates: 2 March
- Competitors: 21 from 7 nations
- Teams: 7
- Winning time: 1:26.29

Medalists
gold medal	Brooklyn McDougall; Carolina Hiller; Ivanie Blondin	Canada
silver medal	McKenzie Browne; Erin Jackson; Kimi Goetz	United States
bronze medal	Zhang Lina; Jin Jingzhu; Li Qishi	China

The Women's team sprint competition at the 2023 World Single Distances Speed Skating Championships was held on 2 March 2023.

== Results ==
The race was started at 21:24.

Rank	Pair	Lane	Country	Time	Diff
1st place, gold medalist(s)	3	s	Canada; Brooklyn McDougall; Carolina Hiller; Ivanie Blondin	1:26.29	
2nd place, silver medalist(s)	4	s	United States; McKenzie Browne; Erin Jackson; Kimi Goetz	1:26.58	+0.29
3rd place, bronze medalist(s)	3	c	China; Zhang Lina; Jin Jingzhu; Li Qishi	1:27.86	+1.57
4	2	s	Kazakhstan; Nadezhda Morozova; Alina Dauranova; Yekaterina Aydova	1:28.32	+2.03
5	1	s	Netherlands; Michelle de Jong; Marrit Fledderus; Isabel Grevelt	1:29.01	+2.72
6	4	c	Poland; Martyna Baran; Iga Wojtasik; Karolina Bosiek	1:29.18	+2.89
7	2	c	Germany; Katja Franzen; Anna Ostlender; Lea Sophie Scholz	1:31.56	+5.27
