= 2022–23 ISU Speed Skating World Cup =

World speed skating tournament in Europe and North-America

- Dates: 11 November 2022 – 19 February 2023

The 2022-23 ISU Speed Skating World Cup was an international level speed skating tournament. The season consisted of 6 events, and began on 11 November 2022 in Stavanger, Norway and ended on 19 February 2023 in Tomaszów Mazowiecki, Poland. The World Cup is organised by the ISU who also runs world cups and championships in short track speed skating and figure skating.

== Calendar ==
The calendar for the 2022–23 season.

WC #	Location	Venue	Date	500 m	1000 m	1500 m	3000 m	5000 m	10000 m	Mass start	Team pursuit	Team sprint
1	Stavanger, Norway	Sørmarka Arena	11–13 Nov	m, w	m, w	m, w	w	m		m, w	m, w	
2	Heerenveen, Netherlands	Thialf	18–20 Nov	m, w	m, w	m, w	w	m		m, w		m, w
3	Calgary, Canada	Olympic Oval	9–11 Dec	m, w	m, w	m, w	w	m		m, w	m, w	
4	Calgary, Canada	Olympic Oval	16–18 Dec	m, w	m, w	m, w		w	m	m, w		m, w
5	Tomaszów Mazowiecki, Poland	Ice Arena	10–12 Feb	m, w	m, w	m, w	w	m		m, w	m, w	
6	Tomaszów Mazowiecki, Poland	Ice Arena	17–19 Feb	m, w	m, w	m, w	w	m		m, w		m, w
Total				6m, 6w	6m, 6w	6m, 6w	5w	5m, 1w	1m	6m, 6w	3m, 3w	3m, 3w

== World Cup standings ==
=== Men's 500 metres ===
Pos	Athlete	Points
1	(Canada) Laurent Dubreuil	314
2	(Japan) Yuma Murakami	294
3	(Japan) Wataru Morishige	268
4	(South Korea) Kim Jun-ho	215
5	(United States) Jordan Stolz	215

=== Women's 500 metres ===
Pos	Athlete	Points
1	(South Korea) Kim Min-sun	354
2	(Austria) Vanessa Herzog	301
3	(United States) Erin Jackson	241
4	(Netherlands) Jutta Leerdam	238
5	(United States) Kimi Goetz	224

=== Men's 1000 metres ===
Pos	Athlete	Points
1	(Netherlands) Hein Otterspeer	283
2	(Canada) Laurent Dubreuil	231
3	(United States) Jordan Stolz	217
4	(Netherlands) Thomas Krol	211
5	(Japan) Ryota Kojima	209

=== Women's 1000 metres ===
Pos	Athlete	Points
1	(Japan) Miho Takagi	301
2	(Netherlands) Jutta Leerdam	300
3	(United States) Kimi Goetz	290
4	(South Korea) Kim Min-sun	228
5	(Austria) Vanessa Herzog	219

=== Men's 1500 metres ===
Pos	Athlete	Points
1	(Netherlands) Kjeld Nuis	276
2	(Canada) Connor Howe	254
3	(United States) Jordan Stolz	236
4	(Netherlands) Wesly Dijs	234
5	(Norway) Sander Eitrem	216

=== Women's 1500 metres ===
Pos	Athlete	Points
1	(Japan) Miho Takagi	330
2	(Norway) Ragne Wiklund	278
3	(Netherlands) Antoinette Rijpma-de Jong	256
4	(Kazakhstan) Nadezhda Morozova	243
5	(Canada) Ivanie Blondin	233

=== Men's long distances ===
Pos	Athlete	Points
1	(Netherlands) Beau Snellink	290
2	(Netherlands) Patrick Roest	288
3	(Norway) Sander Eitrem	268
4	(Italy) Davide Ghiotto	262
5	(Belgium) Bart Swings	240

=== Women's long distances ===
Pos	Athlete	Points
1	(Norway) Ragne Wiklund	342
2	(Canada) Isabelle Weidemann	251
3	(Netherlands) Joy Beune	251
4	(Canada) Ivanie Blondin	241
5	(Czech Republic) Martina Sábliková	224

=== Men's mass start ===
Pos	Athlete	Points
1	(Belgium) Bart Swings	435
2	(Italy) Andrea Giovannini	416
3	(Netherlands) Bart Hoolwerf	360
4	(Switzerland) Livio Wenger	360
5	(South Korea) Chung Jae-won	352

=== Women's mass start ===
Pos	Athlete	Points
1	(Canada) Ivanie Blondin	435
2	(Netherlands) Marijke Groenewoud	424
3	(Italy) Laura Peveri	411
4	(United States) Mia Kilburg	408
5	(Netherlands) Irene Schouten	345

=== Men's team pursuit ===
Pos	Athlete	Points
1	United States	174
2	Norway	156
3	Netherlands	140
4	Canada	137
5	Italy	126

=== Women's team pursuit ===
Pos	Athlete	Points
1	Canada	180
2	Netherlands	151
3	Japan	145
4	United States	134
5	Poland	123

=== Men's team sprint ===
Pos	Athlete	Points
1	Netherlands	156
2	Canada	144
3	Norway	140
4	Poland	137
5	China	136

=== Women's team sprint ===
Pos	Athlete	Points
1	United States	168
2	Canada	162
3	China	127
4	Japan	123
5	Poland	121

== Medal count ==
Rank	Nation	Gold	Silver	Bronze	Total
1	Netherlands	25	21	26	72
2	United States	9	8	9	26
3	Canada	8	14	8	30
4	Japan	7	8	8	23
5	Norway	7	6	6	19
6	South Korea	6	4	2	12
7	Italy	3	2	4	9
8	China	2	1	2	5
9	Belgium	2	0	1	3
10	Austria	1	4	1	6
11	Poland	1	0	1	2
12	Germany	1	0	0	1
13	Czech Republic	0	2	0	2
14	Kazakhstan	0	1	2	3
15	New Zealand	0	1	0	1
16	Estonia	0	0	1	1
16	Switzerland	0	0	1	1
Totals (17 entries)		72	72	72	216
