= Yang Tao (speed skater) =

Chinese speed skater

Personal information
- Nationality: China
- Born: 15 September 1997 (age 28)

Sport
- Sport: Speed skating

Yang Tao
- Simplified Chinese: 杨涛
- Traditional Chinese: 楊濤
Transcriptions
Standard Mandarin
- Hanyu Pinyin: Yáng Tāo
- IPA: [jǎŋ tʰáʊ]

Yang Tao (Chinese: 杨涛; pinyin: Yáng Tāo; Mandarin pronunciation: [jǎŋ tʰáʊ]; born 15 September 1997) is a Chinese speed skater who competes internationally.

He participated at the 2018 Winter Olympics.
