= Kimi Goetz =

American speed skater (born 1994)

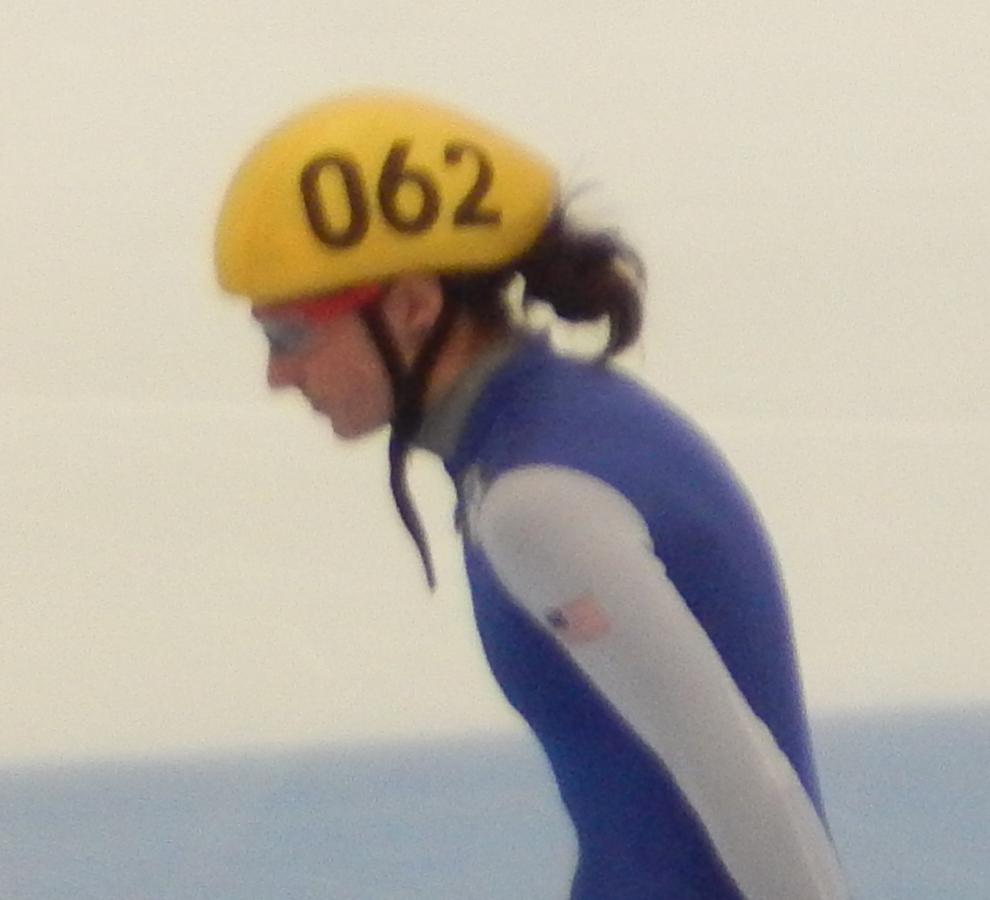

Personal information
- Nationality: American
- Born: August 13, 1994 (age 31) Flemington, New Jersey, U.S.
- Height: 5 ft 6 in (168 cm)

Sport
- Country: United States
- Sport: Speed skating
Medal record
Women's speed skating
Representing the United States
World Single Distances Championships
Silver medal – second place	2023 Heerenveen	Team sprint
Bronze medal – third place	2024 Calgary	500 m
Four Continents Championships
Silver medal – second place	2024 Salt Lake City	500 m
Silver medal – second place	2024 Salt Lake City	1000 m
Bronze medal – third place	2025 Hachinohe	1000 m

Kimi Goetz (born August 13, 1994) is an American speed skater who represented the United States at the 2022 Winter Olympics.

== Early life ==
Raised in Flemington, New Jersey, Goetz got into roller skating as a child. She graduated from Hunterdon Central Regional High School in 2012 and headed out to Salt Lake City, where she saw other inline skaters who had made the transition to speed skating on ice.

== Career ==
During the first day of the 2018 U.S. Olympic Trials, Goetz fell and hit her head and suffered a concussion after a skate technician at the event failed to bolt her blade into her boot properly. As a result, she failed to make the Olympic team. During the summer of 2018, she switched from short track speed skating to long track speed skating. She represented the United States at the 2022 Winter Olympics.

At the 2022–23 ISU Speed Skating World Cup Goetz won five medals, including her first gold medal in the 1,000 meter event on February 12, 2023, in Poland. She ended the season ranked among the top five in both the 500 and 1,000 metres. She also won the World Cup season title in the women's team sprint along with McKenzie Browne and Erin Jackson.

At the 2023 World Single Distances Speed Skating Championships, Goetz won a silver medal in the women's team sprint with a time of 1:26.58.

At the 2024 World Single Distances Speed Skating Championships, Goetz won a bronze medal in the 500 meters with a time of 37.21. This was her first individual World Championships medal.

== Personal life ==
Goetz's boyfriend is Olympic speed skater Mitchell Whitmore.
