= Wang Shiwei (speed skater) =

Chinese speed skater

Personal information
- Nationality: Chinese
- Born: 11 August 1996 (age 29) Shenyang, China

Sport
- Country: China
- Sport: Speed skating
- Event: Sprint
Medal record
Men's speed skating
Representing China
World Single Distances Championships
Silver medal – second place	2020 Salt Lake City	Team sprint
Four Continents Championships
Bronze medal – third place	2023 Quebec	Team pursuit

Wang Shiwei (born 11 August 1996) is a Chinese speed skater.

He won a medal at the 2020 World Single Distances Speed Skating Championships.
