= Felix Rijhnen =

German inline and ice speed skater

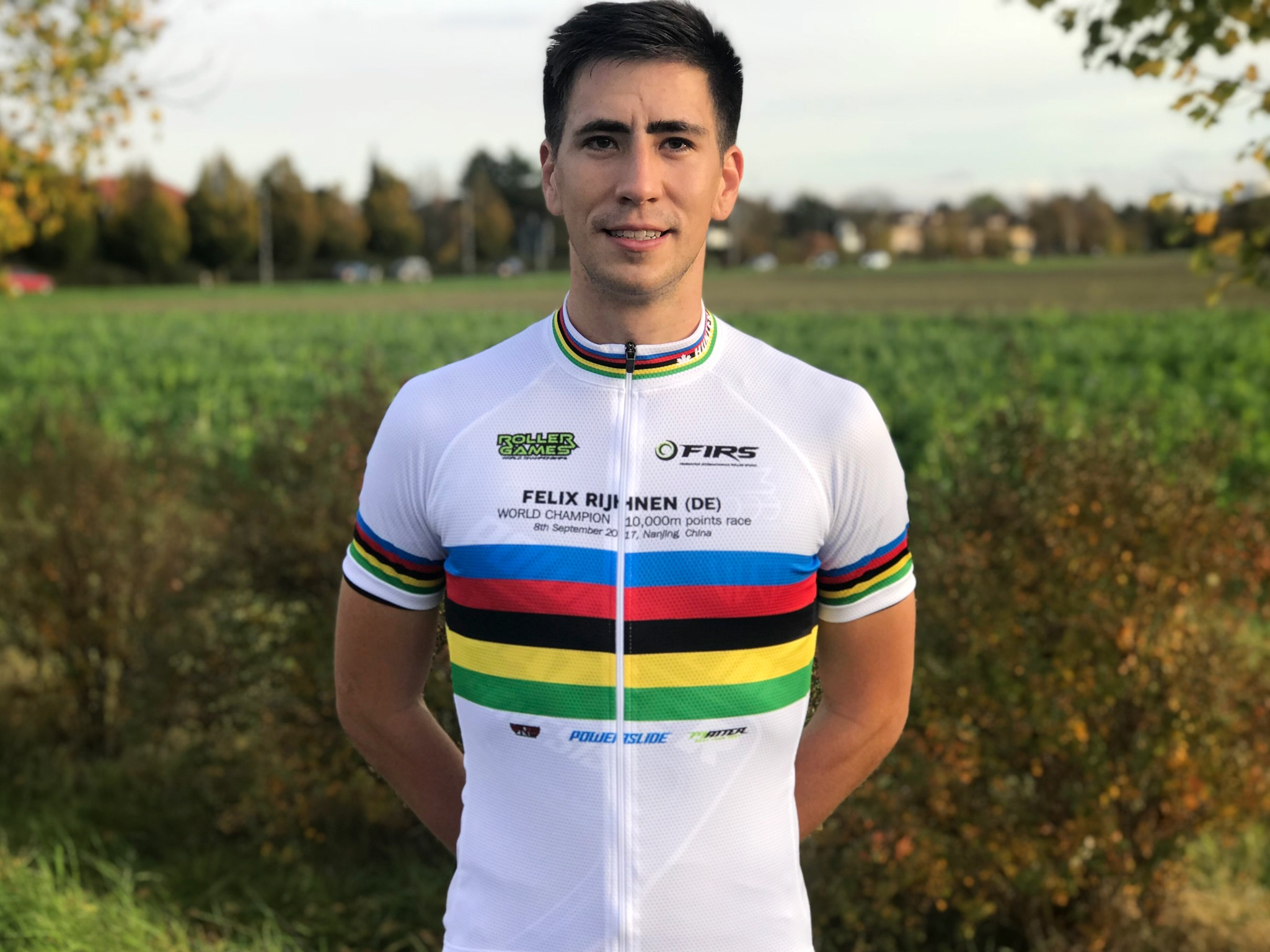
- Rijhnen in 2017

Personal information
- Nationality: German
- Born: 9 July 1990 (age 36) Darmstadt, Germany
- Height: 1.87 m (6 ft 1 1/2 in)
- Weight: 83 kg (183 lb)

Sport
- Country: Germany
- Sport: Inline speed skating; Speed skating
Medal record
Men's inline speed skating
Representing Germany
World Games
Silver medal – second place	2017 Wrocław	15,000 m elimination
Bronze medal – third place	2013 Cali	10,000 m points elimination
World Championships
Gold medal – first place	2017 Nanjing	10,000 m points
Gold medal – first place	2021 Ibagué	Marathon
Silver medal – second place	2013 Ostend	10,000 m points
Silver medal – second place	2024 Montesilvano	15,000 m elimination
Silver medal – second place	2024 Montesilvano	Marathon
Bronze medal – third place	2016 Nanjing	5,000 m relay
Bronze medal – third place	2019 Barcelona	Marathon

Felix Rijhnen (born 9 July 1990) is a German Olympic speed skater and world champion inline speed skater.

== Career ==
Rijhnen began his career in inline speed skating, achieving significant international success before transitioning to ice speed skating later in his career.

=== Inline speed skating ===
Rijhnen is a multiple-time medalist at the Inline Speed Skating World Championships, winning his first world title in the 10,000 m points road race in 2017. He later claimed a second world championship gold in the marathon at the 2021 championships in Ibagué, Colombia. He has also represented Germany at the World Games, winning a bronze medal in 2013 in Cali and a silver medal in 2017 in Wrocław.

In 2019, Rijhnen made history by becoming the first German male skater to win the Berlin Marathon inline skating competition. In 2020, he set the official one-hour inline skating world record by covering 39.932 kilometres (24.813 miles) in Geisingen, Germany.

=== Ice speed skating ===
Transitioning to the ice to compete in long track speed skating, Rijhnen specialized in long-distance events and the mass start.

He qualified for the 2022 Winter Olympics in Beijing, where he finished in 13th place in the men's 5000 metres. He also competed in the men's mass start, though he was disqualified during the semi-finals.

On the ISU Speed Skating World Cup circuit, Rijhnen earned his first podium with a bronze medal in the mass start in Calgary in December 2021. The following season, in November 2022, he secured his first World Cup victory by winning the mass start event in Stavanger, Norway.

== World Cup podiums ==
Date	Season	Location	Rank	Event
11 December 2021	2021–22	Calgary	Bronze	Mass start
13 November 2022	2022–23	Stavanger	Gold	Mass start
