= Alexa Scott =

Canadian speed skater (born 2001)

Personal information
- Born: 3 April 2001 (age 25) Clandeboye, Manitoba, Canada

Sport
- Country: Canada
- Sport: Speed skating
Medal record
Four Continents Speed Skating Championships
Silver medal – second place	2020 Milwaukee	Team pursuit
World Junior Speed Skating Championships
Bronze medal – third place	2020 Tomaszów Mazowiecki	Overall

Alexa Scott (born 3 April 2001) is a Canadian long track speed skater.

== Career ==
At the 2020 World Junior Speed Skating Championships, Scott won the bronze medal in the overall event, despite suffering from food poisoning.

Scott's first senior competition came in 2020, when she won a silver in the women's team pursuit at the 2020 Four Continents Speed Skating Championships in Milwaukee, Wisconsin.

In January 2022, Scott was named to her first Olympic team, where she will contest the 1000 m and team pursuit events.

== Personal records ==
Personal records
Speed skating
Event	Result	Date	Location	Notes
500 m	39.31	13 October 2021	Olympic Oval, Calgary	
1000 m	1:14.58	14 November 2025	Utah Olympic Oval, Salt Lake City	
1500 m	1:55.34	5 December 2021	Utah Olympic Oval, Salt Lake City	
3000 m	4:08.47	3 December 2021	Utah Olympic Oval, Salt Lake City	
