= Li Qishi =

Chinese speed skater

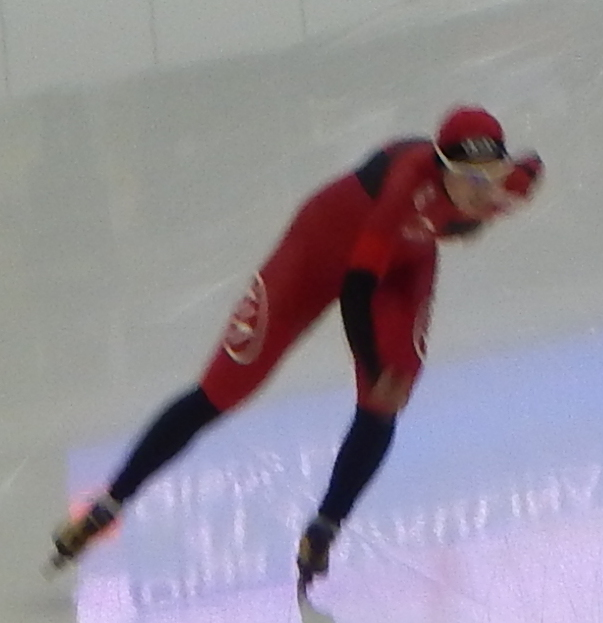
- Li Qishi at the 2016 World Single Distance Speed Skating Championships

Personal information
- Born: 16 August 1993 (age 32) Jilin, China
- Height: 1.75 m (5 ft 9 in)
- Weight: 68 kg (150 lb)

Sport
- Country: China
- Sport: Speed skating

Achievements and titles
- Highest world ranking: 27 (1000 m)
Medal record
Women's speed skating
Representing China
World Single Distances Championships
Bronze medal – third place	2023 Heerenveen	Team sprint

Li Qishi (born 16 August 1993) is a Chinese speed skater.

Li competed for China at the 2014 Winter Olympics. In the 1500 metres she placed 27th.

Li made her World Cup debut in November 2013. On 23 November 2014, she took her first World Cup victory, in the 1000 m race at the World Cup stop in Seoul, South Korea. As of February 2016, Li has a total of 5 individual podium placings in the World Cup, all of them in the 1000 m event. Her best classification placement came in the 2014–15 season with 3rd place in the 1000 m overall standing in the World Cup.
