= Konami Soga =

Japanese speed skater (born 1995)

Personal information
- Nationality: Japanese
- Born: 9 April 1995 (age 31) Suwa, Nagano, Japan
- Height: 1.63 m (5 ft 4 in)

Sport
- Country: Japan
- Sport: Speed skating
- Event: 500 m
- Club: Nihon House Hotel and Resort
Medal record
Women's speed skating
Representing Japan
World Single Distances Championships
Bronze medal – third place	2019 Inzell	500 m
Four Continents Championships
Silver medal – second place	2023 Quebec	500 m

Konami Soga (曽我こなみ, Soga Konami; born 9 April 1995) is a Japanese speed skater.

She participated at the 2019 World Single Distances Speed Skating Championships, winning a medal.
