= Connor Howe =

Canadian speed skater (born 2000)

Personal information
- Born: June 10, 2000 (age 26) Canmore, Alberta, Canada

Sport
- Country: Canada
- Sport: Speed skating
- Club: Banff Canmore Speed Skating Club
Medal record
Men's speed skating
Representing Canada
World Championships
Silver medal – second place	2021 Heerenveen	Team pursuit
Silver medal – second place	2023 Heerenveen	Team pursuit
Bronze medal – third place	2024 Calgary	Team pursuit
Bronze medal – third place	2025 Hamar	1500 m
Four Continents Championships
Gold medal – first place	2024 Salt Lake City	1500 m
Silver medal – second place	2024 Salt Lake City	Team pursuit
Bronze medal – third place	2025 Hachinohe	Team pursuit

Connor Howe (born June 10, 2000) is a Canadian professional speed skater.

He won the silver medal in the team pursuit event at the 2021 World Single Distances Speed Skating Championships.

== Career ==
=== 2022 Winter Olympics ===
In January 2022, Howe secured a place in the Canadian Winter Olympics team for that year. He came fifth in the 1500 metres speed skating event.
