= Jin Jingzhu =

Chinese speed skater

Personal information
- Nationality: Chinese
- Born: 5 January 1992 (age 34)
- Height: 1.66 m (5 ft 5 in)

Sport
- Sport: Speed skating Short track speed skating
Medal record
Representing China
Women's short-track speed skating
Winter Universiade
Silver medal – second place	2011 Erzurum	3000 m relay
World Junior Championships
Bronze medal – third place	2011 Courmayeur	3000 m relay
Women's speed skating
World Single Distances Championships
Bronze medal – third place	2023 Heerenveen	Team sprint

Jin Jingzhu (born 5 January 1992) is a Chinese speed skater. She competed at the 2022 Winter Olympics, in Women's 500 metres, and Women's 1000 metres.

She competed at the 2018-19 ISU Speed Skating World Cup, and 2019-20 ISU Speed Skating World Cup.

She is Korean-Chinese.
