= Erin Jackson =

American speed skater (born 1992)

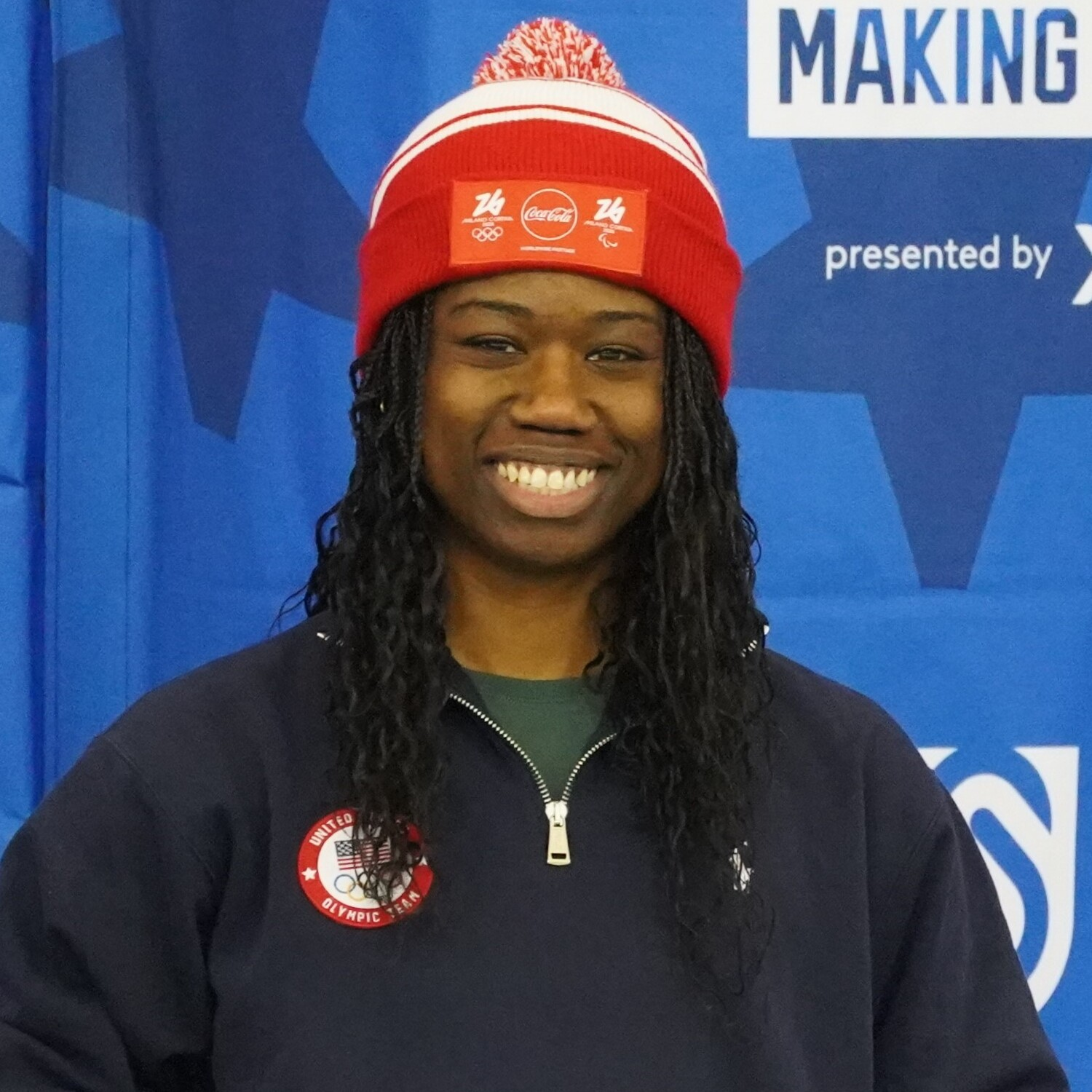
- Jackson at the 2026 U.S. Olympic Team Trials

Personal information
- Born: September 19, 1992 (age 34) Ocala, Florida, U.S.

Sport
- Sport: Speed skating
- Events: 500 m, 1000 m
- Coached by: Renee Hildebrand
Medal record
Representing the United States
Women's speed skating
Olympic Games
| Gold medal – first place | 2022 Beijing | 500 m |
World Single Distances Championships
| Silver medal – second place | 2023 Heerenveen | Team sprint |
| Silver medal – second place | 2024 Calgary | Team sprint |
Four Continents Championships
| Gold medal – first place | 2024 Salt Lake City | 500 m |
| Gold medal – first place | 2025 Hachinohe | 500 m |
| Silver medal – second place | 2024 Salt Lake City | Team sprint |
Women's inline speed skating
Pan American Games
| Gold medal – first place | 2023 Santiago | 500 m + distance |
| Silver medal – second place | 2015 Toronto | 500 m |
| Bronze medal – third place | 2023 Santiago | 200 m time-trial |

Erin Jackson (born September 19, 1992) is an American speed skater, roller derby player, and Olympic gold medalist. Jackson is the first Black woman to win a Winter Olympic gold medal in an individual sport. She qualified for The World Games 2017 in Wrocław, Poland, where she competed in inline speed skating in various distances on road and track. She also qualified to compete in the 500 meters long track speed skating event at the 2018 Winter Olympics in Pyeongchang.

On February 13, 2022, Jackson won the gold medal in the Women's 500m speed skating event at the 2022 Beijing Winter Olympics. She is the first Black American woman to medal in speed skating.

== Early life and education ==
Erin Jackson was born on September 19, 1992 in Ocala, Florida, to Tracy and Rita Jackson. She has one brother. Jackson first skated at eight years old when she tried figure skating. Jackson attended Shores Christian Academy, Howard Middle School, and Forest High School where she was a member of the Engineering and Manufacturing Institute of Technology magnet program. She then went on to the University of Florida, where she graduated with honors from the Materials Science & Engineering program.

== Career ==
Jackson won gold in the 500-meter inline skating race at the 2008–09 Junior World Championships, gold in the same event at the 2014 Pan American Championships, and was named United States Olympic Committee Female Athlete of the Year for Roller Sports in 2012 and 2013. She also competes in roller derby with the Jacksonville RollerGirls of the Women's Flat Track Derby Association (WFTDA), earning the MVP award at the 2014 WFTDA Division 1 Playoff in Evansville, Indiana, and advancing to WFTDA Championships in both 2015 and 2016.

In 2016, Erin Jackson transitioned to speed skating on the ice. She qualified for the 2018 Winter Olympics with only four months of experience in speedskating on ice. Coached by Renee Hildebrand, Jackson qualified at the 500-meter distance, and finished 24th out of 31 competitors in Pyeongchang.

In November 2021, she won her first 500-meter Speedskating World Cup races in Poland with two track records, making her the first Black American woman to win in the World Cup.

Jackson won the gold medal in the women's 500-meter speed skating event at the 2022 Winter Olympics in Beijing, China, besting the field by 0.08 seconds with a time of 37.04 seconds. She had nearly missed out on qualifying for the Olympics after slipping during the U.S. Trials in this event. Her teammate and longtime friend Brittany Bowe won the event but gave up her spot for Jackson to qualify. Jackson became the first Black woman to win a Winter Olympic gold in an individual sport. Jackson also is the first American woman to win an Olympic speed skating gold since Chris Witty in 1000m in 2002, and the first American woman to win the women's 500m since Bonnie Blair in 1994.

In March 2023, Jackson completed at the 2023 World Single Distances Speed Skating Championships and won a silver medal in the team sprint.

She represented the United States at the 2024 Four Continents Speed Skating Championships and won a gold medal in the 500 meter and a silver medal in the team sprint. Later that year, she competed at the November 2024 2025 Four Continents Speed Skating Championships and won a gold medal in the 500 meter.

In January 2026, Jackson competed in the U.S. Olympic Team Trials Long Track at the Pettit National Ice Center in Milwaukee, Wisconsin. She placed first in the Women's 500m and 1000m races earning a spot on the U.S. National Team heading to the 2026 Winter Olympics in Milan, Italy. In February 2026, she and bobsledder Frank Del Duca were elected by their teammates to be the team's flag-bearers in the opening ceremony.

== World Cup overview ==
Overall trophy

| Season | 500 meter | Points |
|---|---|---|
| 2021–2022 | | 660 |
| 2022–2023 | | 241 |
| 2023–2024 | | 522 |
| 2024–2025 | | 524 |
| 2025–2026 | | 335 |

| Season | Location | 500 meter | |
|---|---|---|---|
| 2018–2019 | Obihiro, Japan | 18th | 18th |
| 2018–2019 | Tomakomai, Japan | 10th | |
| 2018–2019 | Tomaszów Mazowiecki, Poland | 12th | 14th |
| 2018–2019 | Heerenveen, Netherlands | 9th | |
| 2018–2019 | Hamar, Norway | 16th | 19th |
| 2019–2020 | Calgary, Canada | 18th | |
| 2021–2022 | Tomaszów Mazowiecki, Poland | 1st place, gold medalist(s) | 1st place, gold medalist(s) |
| 2021–2022 | Stavanger, Norway | 1st place, gold medalist(s) | 2nd place, silver medalist(s) |
| 2021–2022 | Salt Lake City, United States | 1st place, gold medalist(s) | 6th |
| 2021–2022 | Calgary, Canada | 5th | 3rd place, bronze medalist(s) |
| 2021–2022 | Heerenveen, Netherlands | 1st place, gold medalist(s) | 1st place, gold medalist(s) |
| 2022–2023 | Stavanger, Norway | 8th | |
| 2022–2023 | Heerenveen, Netherlands | 4th | |
| 2022–2023 | Calgary, Canada | 6th | 3rd place, bronze medalist(s) |
| 2022–2023 | Tomaszów Mazowiecki, Poland | 5th | 6th |
| 2023–2024 | Obihiro, Japan | 2nd place, silver medalist(s) | 4th |
| 2023–2024 | Beijing, China | 1st place, gold medalist(s) | 1st place, gold medalist(s) |
| 2023–2024 | Stavanger | 2nd place, silver medalist(s) | |
| 2023–2024 | Tomaszów Mazowiecki, Poland | 4th | 1st place, gold medalist(s) |
| 2023–2024 | Salt Lake City, United States | 1st place, gold medalist(s) | |
| 2023–2024 | Quebec, Canada | 5th | 3rd place, bronze medalist(s) |
| 2024–2025 | Nagano, Japan | 9th | 1st place, gold medalist(s) |
| 2024–2025 | Beijing, China | 6th | 4th |
| 2024–2025 | Calgary, Canada | 20th | |
| 2024–2025 | Milwaukee, United States | 2nd place, silver medalist(s) | 2nd place, silver medalist(s) |
| 2024–2025 | Tomaszów Mazowiecki, Poland | 1st place, gold medalist(s) | 1st place, gold medalist(s) |
| 2024–2025 | Heerenveen, Netherlands | 3rd place, bronze medalist(s) | 2nd place, silver medalist(s) |
| 2025–2026 | Salt Lake City, United States | 2nd place, silver medalist(s) | 2nd place, silver medalist(s) |
| 2025–2026 | Calgary, Canada | 3rd place, bronze medalist(s) | 7th |
| 2025–2026 | Heerenveen, Netherlands | 20th | |
| 2025–2026 | Hamar, Norway | 19th | 20th |
| 2025–2026 | Inzell, Germany | 4th | 7th |

| Season | Location | 1000 meter | |
|---|---|---|---|
| 2022–2023 | Stavanger, Norway | 13th | |
| 2022–2023 | Heerenveen, Netherlands | 16th | |
| 2022–2023 | Calgary, Canada | 16th | 13th |
| 2022–2023 | Tomaszów Mazowiecki, Poland | 17th | |
| 2023–2024 | Obihiro, Japan | 20th | |
| 2023–2024 | Tomaszów Mazowiecki, Poland | 11th | |
| 2023–2024 | Salt Lake City, United States | 8th | 16th |
| 2023–2024 | Quebec, Canada | 16th | |
| 2025–2026 | Salt Lake City, United States | 8th | |
| 2025–2026 | Calgary, Canada | 19th | |
| 2025–2026 | Heerenveen, Netherlands | 20th | |
| 2025–2026 | Hamar, Norway | 20th | |
| 2025–2026 | Inzell, Germany | 5th | |

| Season | Location | Team Sprint |
|---|---|---|
| 2018–2019 | Tomaszów Mazowiecki, Poland | 9th |
| 2019–2020 | Tomaszów Mazowiecki, Poland | 6th |
| 2022–2023 | Heerenveen, Netherlands | 3rd place, bronze medalist(s) |
| 2022–2023 | Calgary, Canada | 1st place, gold medalist(s) |
| 2022–2023 | Tomaszów Mazowiecki, Poland | 1st place, gold medalist(s) |
| 2023–2024 | Beijing, China | DQ |
| 2023–2024 | Stavanger, Norway | 1st place, gold medalist(s) |
| 2024–2025 | Beijing, China | 3rd place, bronze medalist(s) |

== Personal life ==
In 2023, she was a contestant on Special Forces: World's Toughest Test, season 2; she was one of three contestants and the only woman to "pass" (make it to the end, effectively winning) on Season 2.

== Honors and awards ==
- Sports Illustrated, Fittest 50: 2022 (#24)
