= Speed skating at the 2026 Winter Olympics – Men's 500 metres =

Men's 500 metres at the XXV Olympic Winter Games
- Speed skating
- Venue: Milano Speed Skating Stadium, Milan
- Date: 14 February 2026
- Competitors: 29 from 14 nations
- Winning time: 33.77

Medalists
1st place, gold medalist(s)		Jordan Stolz	United States
2nd place, silver medalist(s)		Jenning de Boo	Netherlands
3rd place, bronze medalist(s)		Laurent Dubreuil	Canada

The men's 500 m competition in speed skating at the 2026 Winter Olympics was held on 14 February, at the Milano Speed Skating Stadium in Milan. Jordan Stolz of the United States won the event, Jenning de Boo of the Netherlands won the silver medal, and Laurent Dubreuil of Canada bronze.

The medals for the competition were presented by Nawal El Moutawakel, IOC Vice-President, One Gold, Morocco; and the medalists' bouquets were presented by Colin Smith, ISU Director General; Great Britain.

== Background ==
The 2022 champion, Gao Tingyu, and the bronze medalist, Wataru Morishige, qualified for the event. The silver medalist, Cha Min-kyu, did not participate in these Games. Before the Olympics, Jordan Stolz was leading the 500m standings of the 2025–26 ISU Speed Skating World Cup. Jenning de Boo was the 500m 2025 world champion.

== Records ==
Prior to this competition, the existing world, Olympic and track records were as follows.

World record	Pavel Kulizhnikov (RUS)	33.61	Salt Lake City, United States	9 March 2019
Olympic record	Gao Tingyu (CHN)	34.32	Beijing, China	12 February 2022
Track record	Lee Byung-hoon (KOR)	35.49		30 November 2025

A new Olympic record was set twice during the competition; the previous record was set four years earlier and was broken by 0.55 seconds; the top three finishers were under the previous record.

Date	Round	Athlete	Country	Time	Record
14 February	Pair 10	Laurent Dubreuil	Canada	34.26	OR
14 February	Pair 13	Jordan Stolz	United States	33.77	OR, TR

== Results ==
Rank	Pair	Lane	Name	Country	Time	Time behind	Notes
1st place, gold medalist(s)	13	I	Jordan Stolz	United States	33.77		OR, TR
2nd place, silver medalist(s)	13	O	Jenning de Boo	Netherlands	33.88	+0.11	
3rd place, bronze medalist(s)	10	I	Laurent Dubreuil	Canada	34.26	+0.49	
4	14	I	Damian Żurek	Poland	34.35	+0.58	
5	14	O	Sebas Diniz	Netherlands	34.461	+0.69	
6	9	I	Tatsuya Shinhama	Japan	34.466	+0.69	
7	12	O	Gao Tingyu	China	34.47	+0.70	
8	9	O	Marek Kania	Poland	34.48	+0.71	
9	11	O	Yevgeniy Koshkin	Kazakhstan	34.56	+0.79	
10	15	I	Wataru Morishige	Japan	34.62	+0.85	
11	8	O	Xue Zhiwen	China	34.66	+0.89	
12	12	I	Kim Jun-ho	South Korea	34.68	+0.91	
13	15	O	Bjørn Magnussen	Norway	34.72	+0.95	
14	7	I	Lian Ziwen	China	34.76	+0.99	
15	5	I	Koo Kyung-min	South Korea	34.80	+1.03	
16	5	O	Anders Johnson	Canada	34.81	+1.04	
17	3	O	Jeffrey Rosanelli	Italy	34.82	+1.05	
18	11	I	Marten Liiv	Estonia	34.83	+1.06	
19	8	I	Katsuhiro Kuratsubo	Japan	34.85	+1.08	
20	4	O	Nil Llop	Spain	34.86	+1.09	
21	6	O	Joep Wennemars	Netherlands	34.89	+1.12	
22	10	O	Cooper McLeod	United States	34.90	+1.13	
23	7	O	Cédrick Brunet	Canada	34.95	+1.18	
24	6	I	Piotr Michalski	Poland	35.10	+1.33	
25	2	I	Moritz Klein	Germany	35.21	+1.44	
26	2	O	Henrik Fagerli Rukke	Norway	35.36	+1.59	
27	4	I	Zach Stoppelmoor	United States	35.42	+1.65	
28	3	I	Hendrik Dombek	Germany	35.46	+1.69	
29	1	I	Ignaz Gschwentner	Austria	36.07	+2.30	
