= 2026 World Sprint Speed Skating Championships – Men =

Men at the 2026 World Sprint Speed Skating Championships
- Venue: Thialf
- Location: Heerenveen, Netherlands
- Dates: 5–6 March
- Competitors: 28 from 16 nations
- Winning points: 134.670

Medalists
gold medal	Jenning de Boo	Netherlands
silver medal	Jordan Stolz	United States
bronze medal	Ning Zhongyan	China

The Men competition at the 2026 World Sprint Speed Skating Championships was held on 5 and 6 March 2026.

== Background ==
Jordan Stolz, 2026 Olympic gold medalist at the 500 and 1000m, registered for the 2026 World Sprint Championships. He took on defending 2024 champion Ning Zhongyan and runner up Jenning de Boo, Olympic silver medalist at the 500 and 1000m.

De Boo won his first title of World Sprint Champion, winning three of four events. Stolz took second place and Ning Zhongyan won bronze.

== Results ==
=== 500 m ===
The race was started on 5 March at 19:36.

Rank	Pair	Lane	Name	Country	Time	Diff
1	13	I	Jenning de Boo	Netherlands	33.78; TR	
2	12	O	Jordan Stolz	United States	34.13	+0.35
3	9	O	Laurent Dubreuil	Canada	34.26	+0.48
4	1	O	Ning Zhongyan	China	34.36; PB	+0.58
5	13	O	Damian Żurek	Poland	34.51	+0.73
6	11	I	Tatsuya Shinhama	Japan	34.52	+0.74
7	6	I	Joep Wennemars	Netherlands	34.57	+0.79
8	5	O	Janno Botman	Netherlands	34.71	+0.93
9	6	O	Piotr Michalski	Poland	34.72	+0.94
10	9	I	Koo Kyung-min	South Korea	34.73	+0.95
11	10	O	Marten Liiv	Estonia	34.74	+0.96
12	12	I	Bjørn Magnussen	Norway	34.84	+1.06
13	14	I	Marek Kania	Poland	34.87	+1.09
14	5	I	Taiyo Nonomura	Japan	34.94	+1.16
15	10	I	Cédrick Brunet	Canada	34.95	+1.17
16	11	O	Cooper McLeod	United States	35.03	+1.25
16	14	O	Wataru Morishige	Japan	35.03	+1.25
18	7	I	Cho Sang-hyeok	South Korea	35.12	+1.34
19	8	I	Nil Llop	Spain	35.24	+1.46
20	7	O	Henrik Fagerli Rukke	Norway	35.40	+1.62
21	8	O	Artur Galiyev	Kazakhstan	35.49	+1.71
22	4	O	Hendrik Dombek	Germany	35.50	+1.72
23	4	I	Moritz Klein	Germany	35.53	+1.75
24	3	O	Conor McDermott-Mostowy	United States	35.65	+1.87
25	1	I	Mathias Vosté	Belgium	35.74	+1.96
26	2	O	Daniele Di Stefano	Italy	35.76; PB	+1.98
27	3	I	Ignaz Gschwentner	Austria	35.95	+2.17
28	2	I	Botond Bejczi	Hungary	36.64	+2.86

=== 1000 m ===
The race was started on 5 March at 21:27.

Rank	Pair	Lane	Name	Country	Time	Diff
1	12	I	Jenning de Boo	Netherlands	1:06.52	
2	13	I	Jordan Stolz	United States	1:07.14	+0.62
3	12	O	Joep Wennemars	Netherlands	1:07.37	+0.85
4	14	I	Ning Zhongyan	China	1:07.61	+1.09
5	8	O	Laurent Dubreuil	Canada	1:08.35	+1.83
6	11	I	Marten Liiv	Estonia	1:08.40	+1.88
7	5	O	Janno Botman	Netherlands	1:08.53	+2.01
8	4	O	Daniele Di Stefano	Italy	1:08.64	+2.12
9	6	I	Bjørn Magnussen	Norway	1:08.69	+2.17
9	7	I	Koo Kyung-min	South Korea	1:08.69	+2.17
11	14	O	Damian Żurek	Poland	1:08.97	+2.45
12	10	I	Taiyo Nonomura	Japan	1:09.05	+2.53
13	3	O	Cho Sang-hyeok	South Korea	1:09.15	+2.63
14	2	O	Tatsuya Shinhama	Japan	1:09.32	+2.80
14	10	O	Hendrik Dombek	Germany	1:09.32	+2.80
16	9	I	Piotr Michalski	Poland	1:09.46	+2.94
17	9	O	Marek Kania	Poland	1:09.47	+2.95
18	13	O	Cooper McLeod	United States	1:09.49	+2.97
19	8	I	Moritz Klein	Germany	1:09.74	+3.22
20	7	O	Mathias Vosté	Belgium	1:09.93	+3.41
21	4	I	Cédrick Brunet	Canada	1:09.97	+3.45
22	11	O	Conor McDermott-Mostowy	United States	1:10.23	+3.71
23	5	I	Wataru Morishige	Japan	1:10.32	+3.80
24	6	O	Nil Llop	Spain	1:10.50	+3.98
25	1	I	Henrik Fagerli Rukke	Norway	1:10.75	+4.23
26	3	I	Artur Galiyev	Kazakhstan	1:10.83	+4.31
27	2	I	Ignaz Gschwentner	Austria	1:12.65	+6.13
28	1	O	Botond Bejczi	Hungary	1:12.66	+6.14

=== 500 m ===
The race was started on 6 March at 19:36.

Rank	Pair	Lane	Name	Country	Time	Diff
1	13	O	Jenning de Boo	Netherlands	33.93	
2	13	I	Jordan Stolz	United States	34.17	+0.24
3	11	I	Laurent Dubreuil	Canada	34.32	+0.39
4	10	O	Tatsuya Shinhama	Japan	34.53	+0.60
5	9	O	Bjørn Magnussen	Norway	34.54	+0.61
6	12	I	Ning Zhongyan	China	34.65	+0.72
7	8	I	Piotr Michalski	Poland	34.67	+0.74
8	7	O	Marek Kania	Poland	34.77	+0.84
8	12	O	Joep Wennemars	Netherlands	34.77	+0.84
10	10	I	Marten Liiv	Estonia	34.87	+0.94
11	11	O	Koo Kyung-min	South Korea	34.98	+1.05
12	9	I	Janno Botman	Netherlands	35.04	+1.11
13	7	I	Cooper McLeod	United States	35.09	+1.16
14	5	O	Cédrick Brunet	Canada	35.16	+1.23
15	3	O	Nil Llop	Spain	35.20	+1.27
16	6	O	Cho Sang-hyeok	South Korea	35.27	+1.34
16	8	O	Taiyo Nonomura	Japan	35.27	+1.34
18	4	O	Moritz Klein	Germany	35.41	+1.48
19	2	I	Artur Galiyev	Kazakhstan	35.45	+1.52
20	3	I	Henrik Fagerli Rukke	Norway	35.46	+1.53
21	5	I	Hendrik Dombek	Germany	35.75	+1.82
22	2	O	Mathias Vosté	Belgium	35.84	+1.91
23	6	I	Daniele Di Stefano	Italy	35.89	+1.96
24	1	O	Ignaz Gschwentner	Austria	35.97	+2.04
25	4	I	Conor McDermott-Mostowy	United States	36.64	+2.71
26	1	I	Botond Bejczi	Hungary	36.68	+2.75

=== 1000 m ===
The race was started on 6 March at 21:22.

Rank	Pair	Lane	Name	Country	Time	Diff
1	12	O	Jordan Stolz	United States	1:07.26	
2	13	O	Jenning de Boo	Netherlands	1:07.40	+0.14
3	11	O	Ning Zhongyan	China	1:07.88	+0.62
3	12	I	Joep Wennemars	Netherlands	1:07.88	+0.62
5	7	I	Cho Sang-hyeok	South Korea	1:08.82	+1.56
6	9	O	Marten Liiv	Estonia	1:08.87	+1.61
7	13	I	Laurent Dubreuil	Canada	1:08.90	+1.64
8	10	O	Bjørn Magnussen	Norway	1:08.98	+1.72
9	7	O	Piotr Michalski	Poland	1:09.12	+1.86
10	8	O	Koo Kyung-min	South Korea	1:09.21	+1.95
11	4	I	Daniele Di Stefano	Italy	1:09.28	+2.02
12	9	I	Marek Kania	Poland	1:09.45	+2.19
13	11	I	Tatsuya Shinhama	Japan	1:09.52	+2.26
14	6	O	Taiyo Nonomura	Japan	1:09.58	+2.32
15	8	I	Cooper McLeod	United States	1:09.73	+2.47
16	5	I	Hendrik Dombek	Germany	1:09.85	+2.59
17	3	I	Mathias Vosté	Belgium	1:09.98	+2.72
18	6	I	Nil Llop	Spain	1:10.16	+2.90
19	5	O	Cédrick Brunet	Canada	1:10.43	+3.17
20	2	I	Conor McDermott-Mostowy	United States	1:10.46	+3.20
21	3	O	Henrik Fagerli Rukke	Norway	1:10.52	+3.26
22	2	O	Artur Galiyev	Kazakhstan	1:10.73	+3.47
23	1	I	Botond Bejczi	Hungary	1:12.02	+4.76
24	1	O	Ignaz Gschwentner	Austria	1:12.68	+5.42
25	10	I	Janno Botman	Netherlands	2:13.85	+1:06.59
	4	O	Moritz Klein	Germany	Disqualified	

=== Overall standings ===
After all events.

Rank	Name	Country	500m	1000m	500m	1000m	Points	Diff
1st place, gold medalist(s)	Jenning de Boo	Netherlands	33.78	1:06.52	33.93	1:07.40	134.670 WR	
2nd place, silver medalist(s)	Jordan Stolz	United States	34.13	1:07.14	34.17	1:07.26	135.500	+1.66
3rd place, bronze medalist(s)	Ning Zhongyan	China	34.36	1:07.61	34.65	1:07.88	136.755	+4.17
4	Joep Wennemars	Netherlands	34.57	1:07.37	34.77	1:07.88	136.965	+4.59
5	Laurent Dubreuil	Canada	34.26	1:08.35	34.32	1:08.90	137.205	+5.07
6	Bjørn Magnussen	Norway	34.84	1:08.69	34.54	1:08.98	138.215	+7.09
7	Marten Liiv	Estonia	34.74	1:08.40	34.87	1:08.87	138.245	+7.15
8	Tatsuya Shinhama	Japan	34.52	1:09.32	34.53	1:09.52	138.470	+7.60
9	Koo Kyung-min	South Korea	34.73	1:08.69	34.98	1:09.21	138.660	+7.98
10	Piotr Michalski	Poland	34.72	1:09.46	34.67	1:09.12	138.680	+8.02
11	Marek Kania	Poland	34.87	1:09.47	34.77	1:09.45	139.100	+8.86
12	Cho Sang-hyeok	South Korea	35.12	1:09.15	35.27	1:08.82	139.375	+9.41
13	Taiyo Nonomura	Japan	34.94	1:09.05	35.27	1:09.58	139.525	+9.71
14	Cooper McLeod	United States	35.03	1:09.49	35.09	1:09.73	139.730	+10.12
15	Cédrick Brunet	Canada	34.95	1:09.97	35.16	1:10.43	140.310	+11.28
16	Daniele Di Stefano	Italy	35.76	1:08.64	35.89	1:09.28	140.610	+11.88
17	Nil Llop	Spain	35.24	1:10.50	35.20	1:10.16	140.770	+12.20
18	Hendrik Dombek	Germany	35.50	1:09.32	35.75	1:09.85	140.835	+12.33
19	Henrik Fagerli Rukke	Norway	35.40	1:10.75	35.46	1:10.52	141.495	+13.65
20	Mathias Vosté	Belgium	35.74	1:09.93	35.84	1:09.98	141.535	+13.73
21	Artur Galiyev	Kazakhstan	35.49	1:10.83	35.45	1:10.73	141.720	+14.10
22	Conor McDermott-Mostowy	United States	35.65	1:10.23	36.64	1:10.46	142.635	+15.93
23	Ignaz Gschwentner	Austria	35.95	1:12.65	35.97	1:12.68	144.585	+19.83
24	Botond Bejczi	Hungary	36.64	1:12.66	36.68	1:12.02	145.660	+21.98
25	Janno Botman	Netherlands	34.71	1:08.53	35.04	2:13.85	170.940	+1:12.54
26	Moritz Klein	Germany	35.53	1:09.74	35.41	DSQ	105.810	—
	Damian Żurek	Poland	34.51	1:08.97	Did not start		68.995	—
	Wataru Morishige	Japan	35.03	1:10.32	Did not start		70.190	—
