= 2024–25 ISU Speed Skating World Cup – World Cup 2 =

Ice skating competition in Beijing, China

2024–25 ISU Speed Skating World Cup 2
- Venue: National Speed Skating Oval; Beijing; China
- Dates: 29 November — 1 December 2024

The second competition weekend of the 2024–25 ISU Speed Skating World Cup was held at the National Speed Skating Oval in Beijing, China, from Friday, 29 November, until Sunday, 1 December 2024.

== Medal summary ==
=== Men's events ===
Event	Gold	Time	Silver	Time	Bronze	Time	Report
500 m (1)	Jordan Stolz; United States	34.27; TR	Jenning de Boo; Netherlands	34.39	Tatsuya Shinhama; Japan	34.44	
500 m (2)	Jordan Stolz; United States	34.39	Jenning de Boo; Netherlands	34.47	Kim Jun-ho; South Korea	34.67	
1000 m	Jordan Stolz; United States	1:07.62; TR	Jenning de Boo; Netherlands	1:07.82	Ning Zhongyan; China	1:07.91	
1500 m	Jordan Stolz; United States	1:43.94	Ning Zhongyan; China	1:44.26	Kjeld Nuis; Netherlands	1:45.05	
5000 m	Sander Eitrem; Norway	6:09.48	Davide Ghiotto; Italy	6:10.04	Beau Snellink; Netherlands	6:11.68	
Mass start^{A}	Bart Hoolwerf; Netherlands	60	Bart Swings; Belgium	40	Daniele Di Stefano; Italy	20	
Team sprint	Netherlands; Stefan Westenbroek; Jenning de Boo; Tim Prins	1:18.35	United States; Austin Kleba; Cooper McLeod; Zach Stoppelmoor	1:18.50	China; Liu Bin; Lian Ziwen; Ning Zhongyan	1:18.61	

^{A} In mass start, race points are accumulated during the race based on results of the intermediate sprints and the final sprint. The skater with most race points is the winner.

=== Women's events ===
Event	Gold	Time	Silver	Time	Bronze	Time	Report
500 m (1)	Yukino Yoshida; Japan	37.68	Jutta Leerdam; Netherlands	37.89	Dione Voskamp; Netherlands	37.90	
500 m (2)	Kaja Ziomek-Nogal; Poland	37.82	Suzanne Schulting; Netherlands	37.88	Andżelika Wójcik; Poland	37.89	
1000 m	Miho Takagi; Japan	1:14.62	Antoinette Rijpma-de Jong; Netherlands	1:14.72	Angel Daleman; Netherlands	1:14.90	
1500 m	Miho Takagi; Japan	1:55.07	Joy Beune; Netherlands	1:55.19	Angel Daleman; Netherlands	1:55.41	
3000 m	Ragne Wiklund; Norway	4:00.10	Joy Beune; Netherlands	4:01.90	Isabelle Weidemann; Canada	4:02.02	
Mass start^{A}	Marijke Groenewoud; Netherlands	61	Valérie Maltais; Canada	40	Yang Binyu; China	20	
Team sprint	Netherlands; Michelle de Jong; Suzanne Schulting; Angel Daleman	1:26.35	Poland; Andżelika Wójcik; Kaja Ziomek-Nogal; Karolina Bosiek	1:27.07	United States; Erin Jackson; Kimi Goetz; Brittany Bowe	1:27.08	

^{A} In mass start, race points are accumulated during the race based on results of the intermediate sprints and the final sprint. The skater with most race points is the winner.

== Results ==
=== Men's events ===
==== 1st 500 m ====
The race started on 29 November 2024 at 17:28.

Rank	Pair	Lane	Name	Country	Time	Diff
1st place, gold medalist(s)	10	i	Jordan Stolz	United States	34.27; TR	
2nd place, silver medalist(s)	8	i	Jenning de Boo	Netherlands	34.39	+0.12
3rd place, bronze medalist(s)	8	o	Tatsuya Shinhama	Japan	34.44	+0.17
4	7	o	Cooper McLeod	United States	34.58	+0.31
5	5	o	Marten Liiv	Estonia	34.73	+0.46
6	4	i	Sebastian Diniz	Netherlands	34.79	+0.52
7	9	o	Merijn Scheperkamp	Netherlands	34.80	+0.53
8	6	o	Marek Kania	Poland	34.84	+0.57
9	7	i	Kim Jun-ho	South Korea	34.87	+0.60
10	10	o	Stefan Westenbroek	Netherlands	34.88	+0.61
11	6	i	Wataru Morishige	Japan	34.90	+0.63
12	3	o	Damian Żurek	Poland	34.90	+0.63
13	2	i	Yamato Matsui	Japan	34.95	+0.68
13	4	o	Gao Tingyu	China	34.95	+0.68
15	3	i	Bjørn Magnussen	Norway	34.99	+0.72
16	1	i	Cho Sanghyeok	South Korea	35.16	+0.89
17	1	o	Yuma Murakami	Japan	35.17	+0.90
18	2	o	Yankun Zhao	Canada	35.24	+0.97
19	9	i	Laurent Dubreuil	Canada	46.48	+12.21
	5	i	Katsuhiro Kuratsubo	Japan	Disqualified	

==== 2nd 500 m ====
The race started on 1 December 2024 at 17:28.

Rank	Pair	Lane	Name	Country	Time	Diff
1st place, gold medalist(s)	9	i	Jordan Stolz	United States	34.39	
2nd place, silver medalist(s)	8	o	Jenning de Boo	Netherlands	34.47	+0.08
3rd place, bronze medalist(s)	7	i	Kim Jun-ho	South Korea	34.67	+0.28
4	2	o	Katsuhiro Kuratsubo	Japan	34.70	+0.31
5	10	o	Cooper McLeod	United States	34.71	+0.32
6	7	o	Marten Liiv	Estonia	34.75	+0.36
7	6	o	Wataru Morishige	Japan	34.79	+0.40
8	6	i	Marek Kania	Poland	34.83	+0.44
9	9	o	Merijn Scheperkamp	Netherlands	34.85	+0.46
10	8	i	Stefan Westenbroek	Netherlands	34.86	+0.47
11	1	i	Yevgeniy Koshkin	Kazakhstan	34.87	+0.48
12	5	o	Damian Żurek	Poland	34.92	+0.53
13	4	o	Bjørn Magnussen	Norway	35.02	+0.63
14	5	i	Sebastian Diniz	Netherlands	35.06	+0.67
15	2	i	Piotr Michalski	Poland	35.09	+0.70
16	1	o	Liu Bin	China	35.18	+0.79
17	3	o	Zach Stoppelmoor	United States	35.19	+0.80
18	3	i	Yamato Matsui	Japan	35.20	+0.81
19	4	i	Gao Tingyu	China	35.59	+1.20
20	10	i	Laurent Dubreuil	Canada	41.89	+7.50

==== 1000 m ====
The race started on 30 November 2024 at 17:33.

Rank	Pair	Lane	Name	Country	Time	Diff
1st place, gold medalist(s)	8	i	Jordan Stolz	United States	1:07.62; TR	
2nd place, silver medalist(s)	9	i	Jenning de Boo	Netherlands	1:07.82	+0.20
3rd place, bronze medalist(s)	7	i	Ning Zhongyan	China	1:07.91	+0.29
4	10	o	Kjeld Nuis	Netherlands	1:08.07	+0.45
5	10	i	Cooper McLeod	United States	1:08.26	+0.64
6	7	o	Tim Prins	Netherlands	1:08.29	+0.67
7	5	o	Tatsuya Shinhama	Japan	1:08.48	+0.86
8	9	o	Marten Liiv	Estonia	1:08.50	+0.88
9	2	o	Joep Wennemars	Netherlands	1:08.57	+0.95
10	6	o	Taiyo Nonomura	Japan	1:08.89	+1.27
11	5	i	Moritz Klein	Germany	1:09.02	+1.40
12	1	i	Stefan Emele	Germany	1:09.10	+1.48
13	2	i	Damian Żurek	Poland	1:09.15	+1.53
14	8	o	Ryota Kojima	Japan	1:09.28	+1.66
15	1	o	Tijmen Snel	Netherlands	1:09.48	+1.86
16	3	i	Zach Stoppelmoor	United States	1:09.57	+1.95
17	4	i	Kim Min-seok	Hungary	1:09.58	+1.96
18	3	o	Peder Kongshaug	Norway	1:09.80	+2.18
19	4	o	Masaya Yamada	Japan	1:10.03	+2.41
20	6	i	Laurent Dubreuil	Canada	1:23.28	+15.66

==== 1500 m ====
The race started on 29 November 2024 at 18:47.

Rank	Pair	Lane	Name	Country	Time	Diff
1st place, gold medalist(s)	9	o	Jordan Stolz	United States	1:43.94	
2nd place, silver medalist(s)	8	o	Ning Zhongyan	China	1:44.26	+0.32
3rd place, bronze medalist(s)	8	i	Kjeld Nuis	Netherlands	1:45.05	+1.11
4	9	i	Peder Kongshaug	Norway	1:45.20	+1.26
5	10	o	Sander Eitrem	Norway	1:45.50	+1.56
6	2	o	Tim Prins	Netherlands	1:45.62	+1.68
7	5	i	Stefan Emele	Germany	1:45.65	+1.71
8	4	i	Kim Min-seok	Hungary	1:45.83	+1.89
9	7	i	Seitaro Ichinohe	Japan	1:45.92	+1.98
10	4	o	Ryota Kojima	Japan	1:46.12	+2.18
11	6	i	Kazuya Yamada	Japan	1:46.27	+2.33
12	1	o	Moritz Klein	Germany	1:46.41	+2.47
13	1	i	Tijmen Snel	Netherlands	1:46.48	+2.54
14	7	o	Connor Howe	Canada	1:46.71	+2.77
15	2	i	Joep Wennemars	Netherlands	1:46.77	+2.83
16	10	i	Taiyo Nonomura	Japan	1:46.90	+2.96
17	5	o	Bart Swings	Belgium	1:47.18	+3.24
18	3	i	Kristian Gamme Ulekleiv	Norway	1:47.39	+3.45
19	6	o	Didrik Eng Strand	Norway	1:47.49	+3.55
20	3	o	David La Rue	Canada	1:47.75	+3.81

==== 5000 m ====
The race started on 30 November 2024 at 19:12.

Rank	Pair	Lane	Name	Country	Time	Diff
1st place, gold medalist(s)	8	o	Sander Eitrem	Norway	6:09.48	
2nd place, silver medalist(s)	8	i	Davide Ghiotto	Italy	6:10.04	+0.56
3rd place, bronze medalist(s)	6	i	Beau Snellink	Netherlands	6:11.68	+2.20
4	4	o	Chris Huizinga	Netherlands	6:12.08	+2.60
5	4	i	Metoděj Jílek	Czech Republic	6:12.99	+3.51
6	1	o	Marcel Bosker	Netherlands	6:17.07	+7.59
7	7	o	Graeme Fish	Canada	6:17.62	+8.14
8	5	o	Casey Dawson	United States	6:17.97	+8.49
9	7	i	Ted-Jan Bloemen	Canada	6:18.08	+8.60
10	5	i	Michele Malfatti	Italy	6:18.71	+9.23
11	6	o	Bart Swings	Belgium	6:19.28	+9.80
12	3	o	Peder Kongshaug	Norway	6:20.70	+11.22
13	2	o	Timothy Loubineaud	France	6:20.71	+11.23
14	2	i	Wu Yu	China	6:20.92	+11.44
15	3	i	Seitaro Ichinohe	Japan	6:20.95	+11.47
16	1	i	Hallgeir Engebråten	Norway	6:22.28	+12.80

==== Mass start ====
The race started on 1 December 2024 at 18:32.

Rank	Name	Country	Points	Time
1st place, gold medalist(s)	Bart Hoolwerf	Netherlands	60	7:48.08
2nd place, silver medalist(s)	Bart Swings	Belgium	40	7:48.11
3rd place, bronze medalist(s)	Daniele Di Stefano	Italy	20	7:48.15
4	Andrea Giovannini	Italy	10	7:48.32
5	Livio Wenger	Switzerland	6	7:48.57
6	Indra Medard	Belgium	4	8:00.23
7	Lee Seung-hoon	South Korea	3	7:48.71
8	Metoděj Jílek	Czech Republic	3	8:00.75
9	Ethan Cepuran	United States	3	8:03.60
10	Gabriel Odor	Austria	3	8:08.01
11	Jorrit Bergsma	Netherlands	2	7:51.99
12	Mathieu Belloir	France	2	8:04.72
13	Fridtjof Petzold	Germany	1	7:54.82
14	Timothy Loubineaud	France		7:49.55
15	Hayden Mayeur	Canada		7:50.67
16	Felix Maly	Germany		7:50.75
17	Didrik Eng Strand	Norway		7:52.35
18	Peter Michael	New Zealand		7:52.98
19	Szymon Palka	Poland		7:53.13
20	Kotaro Kasahara	Japan		8:01.14

==== Team sprint ====
The race started on 1 December 2024 at 19:23.

Rank	Pair	Lane	Country	Time	Diff
1st place, gold medalist(s)	3	c	Netherlands; Stefan Westenbroek; Jenning de Boo; Tim Prins	1:18.35	
2nd place, silver medalist(s)	5	s	United States; Austin Kleba; Cooper McLeod; Zach Stoppelmoor	1:18.50	+0.15
3rd place, bronze medalist(s)	4	s	China; Liu Bin; Lian Ziwen; Ning Zhongyan	1:18.61	+0.26
4	2	c	Canada; Christopher Fiola; Anders Johnson; Yankun Zhao	1:19.42	+1.07
5	5	c	Poland; Marek Kania; Piotr Michalski; Damian Żurek	1:19.90	+1.55
6	1	s	South Korea; Kim Jun-ho; Cha Min-kyu; Cho Sanghyeok	1:20.30	+1.95
7	3	s	Norway; Pål Myhren Kristensen; Bjørn Magnussen; Peder Kongshaug	1:21.55	+3.20
8	2	s	Kazakhstan; Yevgeniy Koshkin; Nikita Vazhenin; Altaj Zjardembekuly	1:21.87	+3.52
9	4	c	Germany; Tom Rudolph; Moritz Klein; Stefan Emele	1:21.99	+3.64

=== Women's events ===
==== 1st 500 m ====
The race started on 29 November 2024 at 17:00.

Rank	Pair	Lane	Name	Country	Time	Diff
1st place, gold medalist(s)	10	i	Yukino Yoshida	Japan	37.68	
2nd place, silver medalist(s)	6	o	Jutta Leerdam	Netherlands	37.89	+0.21
3rd place, bronze medalist(s)	9	o	Dione Voskamp	Netherlands	37.90	+0.22
4	5	i	Suzanne Schulting	Netherlands	37.98	+0.30
5	8	i	Andżelika Wójcik	Poland	38.00	+0.32
6	10	o	Erin Jackson	United States	38.08	+0.40
7	8	o	Kim Min-sun	South Korea	38.09	+0.41
8	4	o	Kristina Silaeva	Kazakhstan	38.17	+0.49
9	3	o	Michelle de Jong	Netherlands	38.23	+0.55
10	9	i	Kimi Goetz	United States	38.24	+0.56
11	6	i	Naomi Verkerk	Netherlands	38.26	+0.58
12	7	i	Kurumi Inagawa	Japan	38.35	+0.67
13	7	o	Tian Ruining	China	38.39	+0.71
14	2	o	Vanessa Herzog	Austria	38.44	+0.76
15	4	i	Carolina Hiller	Canada	38.46	+0.78
16	5	o	Brittany Bowe	United States	38.50	+0.82
17	2	i	Lee Na-hyun	South Korea	38.54	+0.86
18	3	i	Rio Yamada	Japan	38.65	+0.97
19	1	i	Kako Yamane	Japan	38.82	+1.14
20	1	o	Julie Nistad Samsonsen	Norway	38.91	+1.23

==== 2nd 500 m ====
The race started on 1 December 2024 at 17:00.

Rank	Pair	Lane	Name	Country	Time	Diff
1st place, gold medalist(s)	2	o	Kaja Ziomek-Nogal	Poland	37.82	
2nd place, silver medalist(s)	7	i	Suzanne Schulting	Netherlands	37.88	+0.06
3rd place, bronze medalist(s)	8	i	Andżelika Wójcik	Poland	37.89	+0.07
4	9	o	Erin Jackson	United States	38.02	+0.20
5	10	i	Yukino Yoshida	Japan	38.11	+0.29
6	8	o	Kimi Goetz	United States	38.24	+0.42
7	1	o	Marrit Fledderus	Netherlands	38.27	+0.45
8	9	i	Dione Voskamp	Netherlands	38.28	+0.46
9	10	o	Kim Min-sun	South Korea	38.31	+0.49
10	2	i	Chen Ying-Chu	Chinese Taipei	38.33	+0.51
11	4	i	Michelle de Jong	Netherlands	38.36	+0.54
12	6	o	Naomi Verkerk	Japan	38.36	+0.54
13	3	i	Vanessa Herzog	Austria	38.38	+0.56
14	4	o	Carolina Hiller	Canada	38.42	+0.60
15	3	o	Lee Na-hyun	South Korea	38.45	+0.63
16	7	o	Kurumi Inagawa	Japan	38.50	+0.68
17	5	i	Kristina Silaeva	Kazakhstan	38.54	+0.72
18	5	o	Brittany Bowe	United States	38.57	+0.75
19	6	i	Tian Ruining	China	38.61	+0.79
20	1	i	Nadezhda Morozova	Kazakhstan	39.07	+1.25

==== 1000 m ====
The race started on 30 November 2024 at 17:00.

Rank	Pair	Lane	Name	Country	Time	Diff
1st place, gold medalist(s)	8	i	Miho Takagi	Japan	1:14.62	
2nd place, silver medalist(s)	7	i	Antoinette Rijpma-de Jong	Netherlands	1:14.72	+0.10
3rd place, bronze medalist(s)	8	o	Angel Daleman	Netherlands	1:14.90	+0.28
4	10	i	Han Mei	China	1:14.91	+0.29
5	6	o	Nadezhda Morozova	Kazakhstan	1:15.14	+0.52
6	9	o	Jutta Leerdam	Netherlands	1:15.23	+0.61
7	9	i	Brittany Bowe	United States	1:15.36	+0.74
8	10	o	Kimi Goetz	United States	1:15.45	+0.83
9	7	o	Suzanne Schulting	Netherlands	1:15.51	+0.89
10	6	i	Rio Yamada	Japan	1:15.53	+0.91
11	5	o	Kim Min-sun	South Korea	1:16.18	+1.56
12	4	o	Natalia Jabrzyk	Poland	1:16.52	+1.90
13	3	o	Ayano Sato	Japan	1:16.74	+2.12
14	2	i	Karolina Bosiek	Poland	1:16.80	+2.18
15	4	i	Yukino Yoshida	Japan	1:16.90	+2.28
16	1	o	Marrit Fledderus	Netherlands	1:17.08	+2.46
17	5	i	Vanessa Herzog	Austria	1:17.20	+2.58
18	3	i	Béatrice Lamarche	Canada	1:17.44	+2.82
19	2	o	Lee Na-hyun	South Korea	1:18.43	+3.81
20	1	i	Mia Manganello	United States	1:18.67	+4.05

==== 1500 m ====
The race started on 29 November 2024 at 18:07.

Rank	Pair	Lane	Name	Country	Time	Diff
1st place, gold medalist(s)	9	i	Miho Takagi	Japan	1:55.07	
2nd place, silver medalist(s)	10	i	Joy Beune	Netherlands	1:55.19	+0.12
3rd place, bronze medalist(s)	7	o	Angel Daleman	Netherlands	1:55.41	+0.34
4	7	i	Marijke Groenewoud	Netherlands	1:55.53	+0.46
5	8	i	Antoinette Rijpma-de Jong	Netherlands	1:55.69	+0.62
6	9	o	Han Mei	China	1:56.05	+0.98
7	8	o	Brittany Bowe	United States	1:56.30	+1.23
8	10	o	Ivanie Blondin	Canada	1:56.42	+1.35
9	6	o	Yang Binyu	China	1:56.97	+1.90
10	4	o	Ragne Wiklund	Norway	1:57.24	+2.17
11	4	i	Nadezhda Morozova	Kazakhstan	1:57.47	+2.40
12	1	o	Martina Sábliková	Czech Republic	1:57.64	+2.57
13	2	o	Francesca Lollobrigida	Italy	1:58.11	+3.04
14	5	i	Melissa Wijfje	Netherlands	1:58.16	+3.09
15	3	i	Momoka Horikawa	Japan	1:58.33	+3.26
16	6	i	Valérie Maltais	Canada	1:58.55	+3.48
17	5	o	Isabelle van Elst	Belgium	1:58.68	+3.61
18	1	i	Ayano Sato	Japan	1:58.87	+3.80
19	2	i	Kaitlyn McGregor	Switzerland	1:59.09	+4.02
20	3	o	Kimi Goetz	United States	1:59.17	+4.10

==== 3000 m ====
The race started on 30 November 2024 at 18:16.

Rank	Pair	Lane	Name	Country	Time	Diff
1st place, gold medalist(s)	8	i	Ragne Wiklund	Norway	4:00.10	
2nd place, silver medalist(s)	6	i	Joy Beune	Netherlands	4:01.90	+1.80
3rd place, bronze medalist(s)	4	o	Isabelle Weidemann	Canada	4:02.02	+1.92
4	3	o	Merel Conijn	Netherlands	4:03.33	+3.23
5	7	o	Marijke Groenewoud	Netherlands	4:03.39	+3.29
6	4	i	Francesca Lollobrigida	Italy	4:03.43	+3.33
7	5	i	Sanne In 't Hof	Netherlands	4:03.67	+3.57
8	8	o	Ivanie Blondin	Canada	4:03.80	+3.70
9	6	o	Martina Sábliková	Czech Republic	4:05.25	+5.15
10	7	i	Valérie Maltais	Canada	4:05.27	+5.17
11	5	o	Momoka Horikawa	Japan	4:05.28	+5.18
12	3	i	Yang Binyu	China	4:07.18	+7.08
13	2	i	Han Mei	China	4:08.60	+8.50
14	2	o	Sandrine Tas	Belgium	4:09.67	+9.57
15	1	o	Nadezhda Morozova	Kazakhstan	4:11.15	+11.05
16	1	i	Laura Hall	Canada	4:12.26	+12.16

==== Mass start ====
The race started on 1 December 2024 at 18:11.

Rank	Name	Country	Points	Time
1st place, gold medalist(s)	Marijke Groenewoud	Netherlands	61	8:27.62
2nd place, silver medalist(s)	Valérie Maltais	Canada	40	8:28.97
3rd place, bronze medalist(s)	Yang Binyu	China	20	8:29.72
4	Elisa Dul	Netherlands	10	8:31.08
5	Momoka Horikawa	Japan	6	8:33.02
6	Sandrine Tas	Belgium	3	8:51.37
7	Mia Manganello	United States	3	8:33.38
8	Josie Hofmann	Germany	3	8:37.16
9	Kaitlyn McGregor	Switzerland	2	8:33.95
10	Michelle Uhrig	Germany	2	8:38.00
11	Laura Peveri	Italy	2	8:41.08
12	Fran Vanhoutte	Belgium		8:34.07
13	Park Ji-woo	South Korea		8:36.81
14	Natalia Jabrzyk	Poland		8:37.41
15	Aurora Grinden Løvås	Norway		8:37.47
16	Ramona Härdi	Switzerland		8:50.22
17	Greta Myers	United States		8:53.81
	Ivanie Blondin	Canada	Disqualified	
	Francesca Lollobrigida	Italy	Disqualified	
	Hana Noake	Japan	Withdrawn	

==== Team sprint ====
The race started on 1 December 2024 at 19:00.

Rank	Pair	Lane	Country	Time	Diff
1st place, gold medalist(s)	5	s	Netherlands; Michelle de Jong; Suzanne Schulting; Angel Daleman	1:26.35	
2nd place, silver medalist(s)	5	c	Poland; Andżelika Wójcik; Kaja Ziomek-Nogal; Karolina Bosiek	1:27.07	+0.72
3rd place, bronze medalist(s)	3	s	United States; Erin Jackson; Kimi Goetz; Brittany Bowe	1:27.08	+0.73
4	2	c	Canada; Carolina Hiller; Béatrice Lamarche; Ivanie Blondin	1:27.53	+1.18
5	4	s	China; Tian Ruining; Pei Chong; Han Mei	1:27.79	+1.44
6	3	c	Kazakhstan; Kristina Silaeva; Darja Vazhenina; Nadezhda Morozova	1:28.82	+2.47
7	4	c	Germany; Sophie Warmuth; Anna Ostlender; Lea Sophie Scholtz	1:29.61	+3.26
8	2	s	South Korea; Kim Min-sun; Lee Na-hyun; Kim Min-ji	1:31.29	+4.94
9	1	s	Norway; Julie Berg Sjøbrend; Julie Nistad Samsonsen; Aurora Grinden Løvås	1:32.55	+6.20
10	1	c	Czech Republic; Katerina Kainová; Lucia Korvasová; Zuzana Kuršová	1:35.85	+9.50
