= 2024–25 ISU Speed Skating World Cup – World Cup 6 =

Ice skating competition in Heerenveen, the Netherlands

2024–25 ISU Speed Skating World Cup 6
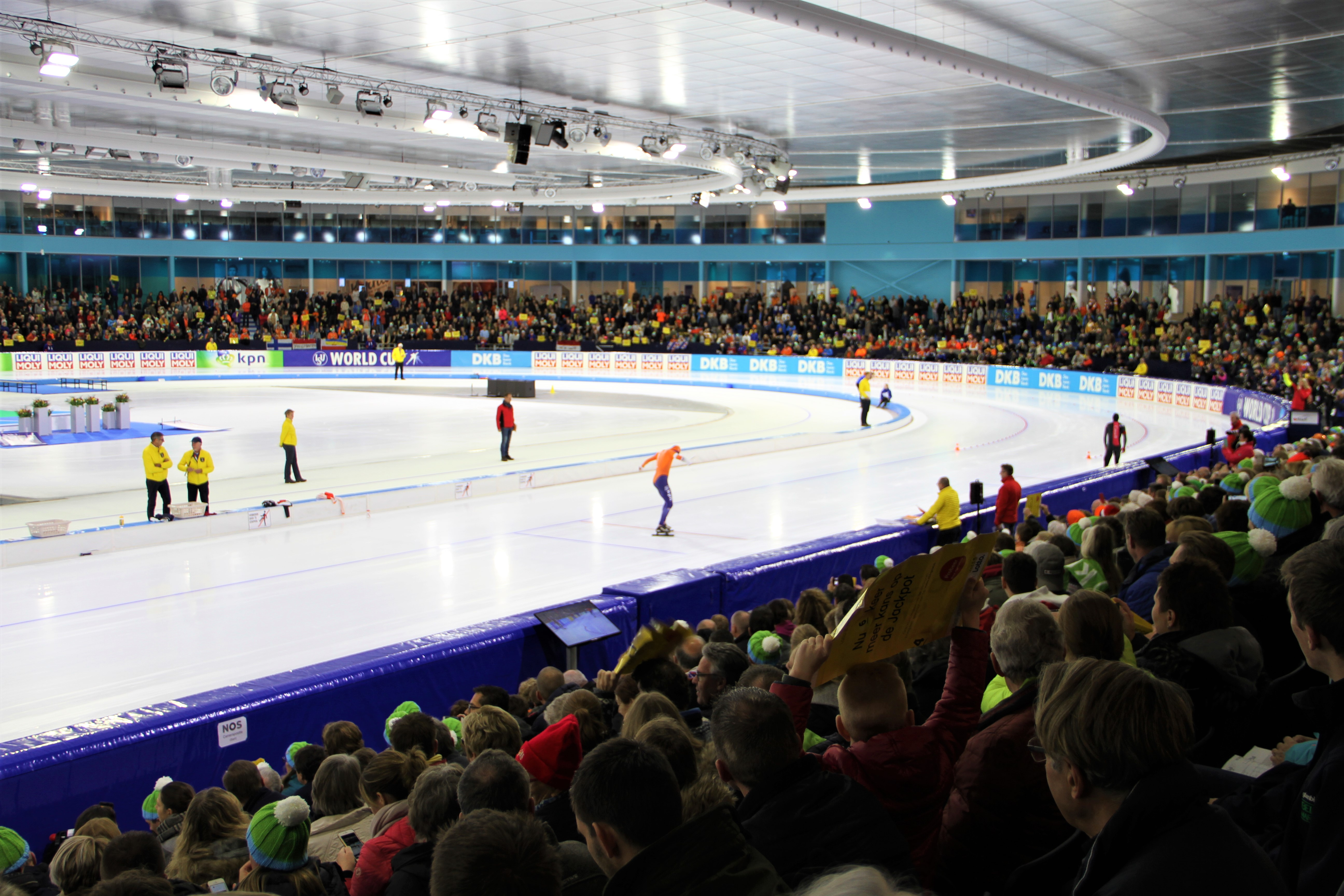
- Venue: Thialf; Heerenveen; Netherlands
- Dates: 28 February — 2 March 2025

The sixth stage of the 2024–25 ISU Speed Skating World Cup is taking place at Thialf in Heerenveen, the Netherlands, from Friday, 28 February to Sunday, 2 March 2025.

== Medal summary ==
=== Men's events ===
Event	Gold	Time	Silver	Time	Bronze	Time	Report
500 m (1)	Jenning de Boo; Netherlands	34.18	Jordan Stolz; United States	34.27	Yevgeniy Koshkin; Kazakhstan	34.30	
500 m (2)	Yevgeniy Koshkin; Kazakhstan	34.46	Laurent Dubreuil; Canada	34.51	Jenning de Boo; Netherlands	34.52	
1000 m	Jenning de Boo; Netherlands	1:07.45	Cooper McLeod; United States	1:07.87	Tim Prins; Netherlands	1:07.98	
1500 m	Peder Kongshaug; Norway	1:44.01	Sander Eitrem; Norway	1:44.21	Ning Zhongyan; China	1:44.38	
5000 m	Chris Huizinga; Netherlands	6:08.07	Sander Eitrem; Norway	6:10.10	Beau Snellink; Netherlands	6:10.34	
Mass start^{A}	Andrea Giovannini; Italy	61	Chung Jae-won; South Korea	43	Jorrit Bergsma; Netherlands	20	
Team Pursuit	United States; Casey Dawson; Emery Lehman; Ethan Cepuran	3:39.40	Italy; Davide Ghiotto; Michele Malfatti; Andrea Giovannini	3:41.14	Netherlands; Chris Huizinga; Beau Snellink; Jorrit Bergsma	3:41.48	

^{A} In mass start, race points are accumulated during the race based on results of the intermediate sprints and the final sprint. The skater with most race points is the winner.

=== Women's events ===
Event	Gold	Time	Silver	Time	Bronze	Time	Report
500 m (1)	Femke Kok; Netherlands	37.05	Kim Min-sun; South Korea	37.65	Erin Jackson; United States	37.71	
500 m (2)	Femke Kok; Netherlands	37.13	Erin Jackson; United States	37.43	Kaja Ziomek-Nogal; Poland	37.73	
1000 m	Jutta Leerdam; Netherlands	1:14.27	Miho Takagi; Japan	1:14.49	Han Mei; China	1:14.80	
1500 m	Joy Beune; Netherlands	1:53.70	Miho Takagi; Japan	1:53.99	Han Mei; China	1:54.52	
3000 m	Ragne Wiklund; Norway	3:57.41	Joy Beune; Netherlands	3:58.72	Francesca Lollobrigida; Italy	3:58.89	
Mass start^{A}	Marijke Groenewoud; Netherlands	60	Ivanie Blondin; Canada	40	Mia Manganello; United States	20	
Team pursuit	Netherlands; Joy Beune; Antoinette Rijpma-de Jong; Marijke Groenewoud	2:54.87	Japan; Miho Takagi; Momoka Horikawa; Ayano Sato	2:55.96	United States; Brittany Bowe; Mia Manganello; Greta Myers	3:00.19	

^{A} In mass start, race points are accumulated during the race based on results of the intermediate sprints and the final sprint. The skater with most race points is the winner.

=== Mixed events ===
Event	Gold	Time	Silver	Time	Bronze	Time	Report
Mixed gender relay	Switzerland; Kaitlyn McGregor; Livio Wenger	2:59.09	Spain; Sara Cabrera; Nil Llop Izquierdo	3:00.74	Poland; Martyna Baran; Mateusz Mikołajuk	3:01.30	

== Results ==
=== Men's events ===
==== 1st 500 m ====
The race started on 28 February 2025 at 19:28.

Rank	Pair	Lane	Name	Country	Time	Diff
1st place, gold medalist(s)	10	o	Jenning de Boo	Netherlands	34.18	
2nd place, silver medalist(s)	8	o	Jordan Stolz	United States	34.27	+0.09
3rd place, bronze medalist(s)	2	i	Yevgeniy Koshkin	Kazakhstan	34.30	+0.12
4	4	i	Kim Jun-ho	South Korea	34.37	+0.19
5	9	o	Tatsuya Shinhama	Japan	34.38	+0.20
6	8	i	Laurent Dubreuil	Canada	34.41	+0.23
7	6	i	Sebastian Diniz	Netherlands	34.42	+0.24
8	6	o	Marten Liiv	Estonia	34.57	+0.39
9	10	i	Marek Kania	Poland	34.57	+0.39
10	5	o	Merijn Scheperkamp	Netherlands	34.65	+0.47
11	4	o	Bjørn Magnussen	Norway	34.66	+0.48
12	7	o	Wataru Morishige	Japan	34.68	+0.50
13	9	i	Cooper McLeod	United States	34.74	+0.56
14	1	i	Cho Sanghyeok	South Korea	34.77	+0.59
15	2	o	Katsuhiro Kuratsubo	Japan	34.81	+0.63
16	3	i	Piotr Michalski	Poland	34.93	+0.75
17	7	i	Damian Żurek	Poland	34.94	+0.76
18	3	o	Zach Stoppelmoor	United States	35.11	+0.93
19	1	o	Ryota Kojima	Japan	35.16	+0.98
20	5	i	Stefan Westenbroek	Netherlands	35.24	+1.06

==== 2nd 500 m ====
The race started on 2 March 2025 at 15:18.

Rank	Pair	Lane	Name	Country	Time	Diff
1st place, gold medalist(s)	4	o	Yevgeniy Koshkin	Kazakhstan	34.46	
2nd place, silver medalist(s)	9	o	Laurent Dubreuil	Canada	34.51	+0.05
3rd place, bronze medalist(s)	8	i	Jenning de Boo	Netherlands	34.52	+0.06
4	6	o	Kim Yun-ho	South Korea	34.55	+0.09
5	10	i	Cooper McLeod	United States	34.62	+0.16
6	2	o	Katsuhiro Kuratsubo	Japan	34.66	+0.20
7	8	o	Marek Kania	Poland	34.68	+0.22
8	10	o	Tatsuya Shinhama	Japan	34.69	+0.23
9	9	i	Wataru Morishige	Japan	34.70	+0.24
10	5	i	Merijn Scheperkamp	Netherlands	34.75	+0.29
11	7	o	Sebastian Diniz	Netherlands	34.78	+0.32
12	7	i	Damian Zurek	Poland	34.88	+0.42
13	1	i	Christopher Fiola	Canada	35.06	+0.60
14	4	i	Bjørn Magnussen	Norway	35.07	+0.61
15	3	i	Piotr Michalski	Poland	35.09	+0.63
16	1	o	Nil Llop Izquierdo	Spain	35.13	+0.67
17	2	i	Lian Ziwen	China	35.16	+0.70
18	5	o	Stefan Westenbroek	Netherlands	35.25	+0.79
19	6	i	Marten Liiv	Estonia	35.56	+1.10
20	3	o	Zach Stoppelmoor	United States	1:13.40	+38.94

==== 1000 m ====
The race started on 1 March 2025 at 17:17.

Rank	Pair	Lane	Name	Country	Time	Diff
1st place, gold medalist(s)	9	o	Jenning de Boo	Netherlands	1:07.45	
2nd place, silver medalist(s)	10	o	Cooper McLeod	United States	1:07.87	+0.42
3rd place, bronze medalist(s)	5	i	Tim Prins	Netherlands	1:07.98	+0.53
4	9	i	Ning Zhongyan	China	1:08.07	+0.62
5	6	o	Laurent Dubreuil	Canada	1:08.19	+0.74
6	2	i	Mathias Vosté	Belgium	1:08.27	+0.82
7	8	i	Joep Wennemars	Netherlands	1:08.36	+0.91
8	10	i	Marten Liiv	Estonia	1:08.52	+1.07
9	3	i	Connor Howe	Canada	1:08.68	+1.23
10	4	o	Ryota Kojima	Japan	1:08.92	+1.47
11	5	o	Moritz Klein	Germany	1:08.97	+1.52
12	2	o	Marek Kania	Poland	1:09.06	+1.61
13	8	o	Damian Żurek	Poland	1:09.18	+1.73
14	4	i	Stefan Emele	Germany	1:09.20	+1.75
15	7	o	Kim Min-seok	Hungary	1:09.23	+1.78
16	1	o	Finn Sonnekalb	Germany	1:09.31	+1.86
17	7	i	Taiyo Nonomura	Japan	1:09.43	+1.98
18	6	i	Tatsuya Shinhama	Japan	1:09.52	+2.07
19	3	o	Zach Stoppelmoor	United States	1:10.36	+2.91

==== 1500 m ====
The race started on 28 February 2025 at 20:53.

Rank	Pair	Lane	Name	Country	Time	Diff
1st place, gold medalist(s)	9	i	Peder Kongshaug	Norway	1:44.01	
2nd place, silver medalist(s)	8	o	Sander Eitrem	Norway	1:44.21	+0.20
3rd place, bronze medalist(s)	10	i	Ning Zhongyan	China	1:44.38	+0.37
4	5	i	Tim Prins	Netherlands	1:44.41	+0.40
5	8	i	Jordan Stolz	United States	1:44.72	+0.71
6	7	i	Connor Howe	Canada	1:44.84	+0.83
7	4	i	Daniele Di Stefano	Italy	1:44.89	+0.88
8	3	i	Tijmen Snel	Netherlands	1:45.06	+1.05
9	5	o	Wesly Dijs	Netherlands	1:45.23	+1.22
10	10	o	Kim Min-seok	Hungary	1:45.25	+1.24
11	2	o	Vladimir Semirunniy	Poland	1:45.29	+1.28
12	4	o	Kazuya Yamada	Japan	1:45.47	+1.46
13	6	o	Seitaro Ichinohe	Japan	1:45.64	+1.63
14	3	o	Didrik Eng Strand	Norway	1:45.66	+1.65
15	7	o	Taiyo Nonomura	Japan	1:45.88	+1.87
16	6	i	Stefan Emele	Germany	1:45.91	+1.90
17	2	i	Joep Wennemars	Netherlands	1:46.32	+2.31
18	1	i	Finn Sonnekalb	Germany	1:46.47	+2.46
	9	o	Kjeld Nuis	Netherlands	Disqualified	

==== 5000 m ====
The race started on 1 March 2025 at 16:37.

Rank	Pair	Lane	Name	Country	Time	Diff
1st place, gold medalist(s)	3	o	Chris Huizinga	Netherlands	6:08.07	
2nd place, silver medalist(s)	7	o	Sander Eitrem	Norway	6:10.10	+2.03
3rd place, bronze medalist(s)	4	i	Beau Snellink	Netherlands	6:10.34	+2.27
4	1	o	Vladimir Semirunniy	Poland	6:13.39	+5.32
5	2	o	Riccardo Lorello	Italy	6:13.55	+5.48
6	8	i	Casey Dawson	United States	6:13.85	+5.78
7	5	o	Ted-Jan Bloemen	Canada	6:14.35	+6.28
8	8	o	Metodĕj Jílek	Czech Republic	6:14.65	+6.58
9	4	o	Timothy Loubineaud	France	6:14.86	+6.79
10	3	i	Marcel Bosker	Netherlands	6:15.03	+6.96
11	2	i	Felix Maly	Germany	6:16.70	+8.63
12	6	i	Davide Ghiotto	Italy	6:17.47	+9.40
13	1	i	Jorrit Bergsma	Netherlands	6:18.90	+10.83
14	4	i	Michele Malfatti	Italy	6:19.49	+11.42
15	6	o	Graeme Fish	Canada	6:20.23	+12.16
16	5	i	Bart Swings	Belgium	6:20.68	+12.61

==== Mass start ====
The race started on 2 March 2025 at 16:38.

Rank	Name	Country	Sprint points	Time
1st place, gold medalist(s)	Andrea Giovannini	Italy	61	7:48.31
2nd place, silver medalist(s)	Chung Jae-won	South Korea	43	7:48.43
3rd place, bronze medalist(s)	Jorrit Bergsma	Netherlands	20	7:48.44
4	Livio Wenger	Switzerland	10	7:48.58
5	Indra Medard	Belgium	6	7:48.63
6	David La Rue	Canada	3	7:48.79
7	Timothy Loubineaud	France	3	8:03.59
8	Mathieu Belloir	France	3	8:21.70
9	Felix Maly	Germany	2	7:51.90
10	Bart Swings	Belgium	2	8:04.47
11	Viktor Hald Thorup	Denmark	2	8:11.55
12	Ethan Cepuran	United States	1	7:50.89
13	Bart Hoolwerf	Netherlands	1	8:02.02
14	Fridtjof Petzold	Germany		8:01.33
15	Lee Seung-hoon	South Korea		8:02.00
16	Daniele di Stefano	Italy		8:02.23
17	Shomu Sasaki	Japan		8:03.09
18	Gabriel Odor	Austria		8:05.79
19	Motonaga Arito	Japan		8:05.81
20	Allan Dahl Johansson	Norway		8:14.76

==== Team pursuit ====
The race started on 2 March 2025 at 14:01

Rank	Pair	Lane	Country	Time	Diff
1st place, gold medalist(s)	2	s	United States; Casey Dawson; Emery Lehman; Ethan Cepuran	3:39.40	
2nd place, silver medalist(s)	2	c	Italy; Davide Ghiotto; Michele Malfatti; Andrea Giovannini	3:41.14	+1.74
3rd place, bronze medalist(s)	1	s	Netherlands; Chris Huizinga; Beau Snellink; Jorrit Bergsma	3:41.48	+2:08
4	3	s	Norway; Sander Eitrem; Sigurd Henriksen; Didrik Eng Strand	3:43.92	+4.52
5	3	c	Japan; Motonaga Arito; Shomu Sasaki; Ryosuke Tsuchiya	3:44.06	+4.66
6	1	c	France; Timothy Loubineaud; Valentin Thiebault; Germain Deschamps	3:44.72	+5.32

=== Women's events ===
==== 1st 500 m ====
The race started on 28 February 2025 at 19:00.

Rank	Pair	Lane	Name	Country	Time	Diff
1st place, gold medalist(s)	2	i	Femke Kok	Netherlands	37.05	
2nd place, silver medalist(s)	7	o	Kim Min-sun	South Korea	37.65	+0.60
3rd place, bronze medalist(s)	10	i	Erin Jackson	United States	37.71	+0.66
4	4	i	Jutta Leerdam	Netherlands	37.77	+0.72
5	8	i	Suzanne Schulting	Netherlands	37.83	+0.78
6	9	i	Kurumi Inagawa	Japan	37.87	+0.82
7	3	o	Lee Na-hyun	South Korea	37.91	+0.86
8	6	i	Naomi Verkerk	Netherlands	37.91	+0.86
9	7	i	Kaja Ziomek-Nogal	Poland	37.97	+0.92
10	1	i	Sophie Warmuth	Germany	38.01	+0.96
11	8	o	Andżelika Wójcik	Poland	38.07	+1.02
12	5	i	Kristina Silaeva	Kazakhstan	38.14	+1.09
13	4	o	Tian Ruining	China	38.15	+1.10
14	6	o	Carolina Hiller	Canada	38.20	+1.15
15	10	o	Yukino Yoshida	Japan	38.26	+1.21
16	3	i	Karolina Bosiek	Poland	38.26	+1.21
17	5	o	Serena Pergher	Italy	38.28	+1.23
18	2	o	Julie Nistad Samsonsen	Norway	38.42	+1.37
19	1	o	Wang Jingziqian	China	38.57	+1.52
	9	o	Dione Voskamp	Netherlands	Disqualified	

==== 2nd 500 m ====
The race started on 2 March 2025 at 14:50.

Rank	Pair	Lane	Name	Country	Time	Diff
1st place, gold medalist(s)	4	o	Femke Kok	Netherlands	37.13	
2nd place, silver medalist(s)	10	o	Erin Jackson	United States	37.43	+0.30
3rd place, bronze medalist(s)	7	i	Kaja Ziomek-Nogal	Poland	37.73	+0.60
4	9	o	Yukino Yoshida	Japan	37.79	+0.66
5	7	o	Kim Min-sun	South Korea	37.80	+0.67
6	2	i	Lee Na-hyun	South Korea	37.84	+0.71
6	10	i	Andżelika Wójcik	Poland	37.84	+0.71
8	8	i	Suzanne Schulting	Netherlands	37.86	+0.73
9	6	i	Naomi Verkerk	Netherlands	37.95	+0.82
10	8	o	Kurumi Inagawa	Japan	37.95	+0.82
11	5	i	Jutta Leerdam	Netherlands	37.97	+0.84
12	5	o	Kristina Silaeva	Kazakhstan	38.04	+0.91
13	3	i	Tian Ruining	China	38.07	+0.94
14	4	i	Serena Pergher	Italy	38.11	+0.98
15	6	o	Carolina Hiller	Canada	38.19	+1.06
16	3	o	Karolina Bosiek	Poland	38.31	+1.18
17	2	o	Rio Yamada	Japan	38.38	+1.25
18	9	i	Dione Voskamp	Netherlands	38.45	+1.32
19	1	i	Anna Ostlender	Germany	38.59	+1.46
20	1	o	Brooklyn McDougall	Canada	38.71	+1.58

==== 1000 m ====
The race started on 1 March 2025 at 14:05.

Rank	Pair	Lane	Name	Country	Time	Diff
1st place, gold medalist(s)	8	o	Jutta Leerdam	Netherlands	1:14.27	
2nd place, silver medalist(s)	9	o	Miho Takagi	Japan	1:14.49	+0.22
3rd place, bronze medalist(s)	9	i	Han Mei	China	1:14.80	+0.53
4	10	o	Antoinette Rijpma-de Jong	Netherlands	1:15.04	+0.77
5	9	i	Angel Daleman	Netherlands	1:15.26	+0.99
6	10	i	Brittany Bowe	United States	1:15.27	+1.00
7	7	i	Suzanne Schulting	Netherlands	1:15.38	+1.11
8	1	i	Nikola Zdráhalová	Czech Republic	1:15.43	+1.16
9	5	i	Marrit Fledderus	Netherlands	1:15.54	+1.27
10	5	o	Karolina Bosiek	Poland	1:15.64	+1.37
11	6	o	Rio Yamada	Japan	1:15.69	+1.42
12	7	o	Natalia Jabrzyk	Poland	1:15.72	+1.45
13	1	o	Yin Qi	China	1:15.74	+1.47
14	6	i	Ayano Sato	Japan	1:16.04	+1.77
15	2	o	Kim Min-sun	South Korea	1:16.40	+2.13
16	4	i	Béatrice Lamarche	Canada	1:16.42	+2.15
17	4	o	Nadezhda Morozova	Kazakhstan	1:17.02	+2.75
18	3	o	Lea Sophie Scholz	Germany	1:17.18	+2.91
19	2	i	Isabelle van Elst	Belgium	1:17.61	+3.34
20	3	i	Yukino Yoshida	Japan	1:18.02	+3.75

==== 1500 m ====
The race started on 28 February 2025 at 20:11.

Rank	Pair	Lane	Name	Country	Time	Diff
1st place, gold medalist(s)	8	i	Joy Beune	Netherlands	1:53.70	
2nd place, silver medalist(s)	10	o	Miho Takagi	Japan	1:53.99	+0.29
3rd place, bronze medalist(s)	10	i	Han Mei	China	1:54.52	+0.82
4	7	o	Francesca Lollobrigida	Italy	1:54.87	+1.17
5	6	i	Yang Binyu	China	1:55.06	+1.36
6	1	o	Yin Qi	China	1:55.31	+1.61
7	1	i	Nikola Zdráhalová	Czech Republic	1:55.43	+1.73
8	6	o	Antoinette Rijpma-de Jong	Netherlands	1:55.45	+1.75
9	9	i	Marijke Groenewoud	Netherlands	1:55.55	+1.85
10	5	i	Valérie Maltais	Canada	1:55.59	+1.89
11	8	o	Brittany Bowe	United States	1:55.73	+2.03
12	9	o	Ragne Wiklund	Norway	1:56.08	+2.38
13	3	o	Momoka Horikawa	Japan	1:56.29	+2.59
14	4	i	Isabelle van Elst	Belgium	1:56.85	+3.15
15	2	i	Martina Sáblíková	Czech Republic	1:56.87	+3.17
16	7	i	Ivanie Blondin	Canada	1:56.91	+3.21
17	5	o	Angel Daleman	Netherlands	1:57.23	+3.53
18	4	o	Melissa Wijfje	Netherlands	1:57.26	+3.56
19	2	o	Lea Sophie Scholz	Germany	1:57.55	+3.85
20	3	i	Greta Myers	United States	1:58.09	+4.39

==== 3000 m ====
The race started on 1 March 2025 at 15:37.

Rank	Pair	Lane	Name	Country	Time	Diff
1st place, gold medalist(s)	8	i	Ragne Wiklund	Norway	3:57.41	
2nd place, silver medalist(s)	7	o	Joy Beune	Netherlands	3:58.72	+1.31
3rd place, bronze medalist(s)	6	i	Francesca Lollobrigida	Italy	3:58.89	+1.48
4	5	i	Isabelle Weidemann	Canada	4:01.65	+4.24
5	8	o	Merel Conijn	Netherlands	4:01.66	+4.25
6	7	i	Marijke Groenewoud	Netherlands	4:01.93	+4.52
7	6	o	Martina Sáblíková	Czech Republic	4:03.51	+6.10
8	4	i	Valérie Maltais	Canada	4:03.89	+6.48
9	3	i	Momoka Horikawa	Japan	4:04.11	+6.70
10	3	o	Yang Binyu	China	4:04.13	+6.72
11	4	o	Sanne In 't Hof	Netherlands	4:05.71	+8.30
12	5	o	Ivanie Blondin	Canada	4:06.57	+9.16
13	2	o	Ahenaer Adake	China	4:07.29	+9.88
14	1	i	Elisa Dul	Netherlands	4:07.68	+10.27
15	1	o	Alice Marletti	Italy	4:09.83	+12.42
16	2	i	Josie Hofmann	Germany	4:21.29	+23.88

==== Mass start ====
The race started on 2 March 2025 at 16:17.

Rank	Name	Country	Sprint points	Time
1st place, gold medalist(s)	Marijke Groenewoud	Netherlands	60	8:27.52
2nd place, silver medalist(s)	Ivanie Blondin	Canada	40	8:27.54
3rd place, bronze medalist(s)	Mia Manganello	United States	20	8:27.62
4	Francesca Lollobrigida	Italy	10	8:27.63
5	Ayano Sato	Japan	6	8:28.17
6	Greta Myers	United States	4	8:32.55
7	Park Ji-woo	South Korea	3	8:28.24
8	Valérie Maltais	Canada	3	8:28.33
9	Jing Wenjin	China	3	8:31.13
10	Kaitlyn McGregor	Switzerland	3	8:33.47
11	Elisa Dul	Netherlands	2	8:34.72
12	Yang Binyu	China	1	8:28.28
13	Michelle Uhrig	Germany	1	8:31.10
14	Ramona Härdi	Switzerland	1	8:36.88
15	Aurora Grinden Løvås	Norway		8:30.82
16	Zuzana Kuršová	Czech Republic		8:32.32

==== Team pursuit ====
The race started on 2 March 2025 at 13:30

Rank	Pair	Lane	Country	Time	Diff
1st place, gold medalist(s)	2	s	Netherlands; Marijke Groenewoud; Antoinette Rijpma-de Jong; Joy Beune	2:54.87	
2nd place, silver medalist(s)	3	c	Japan; Miho Takagi; Momoka Horikawa; Ayano Sato	2:55.96	+1.09
3rd place, bronze medalist(s)	3	s	United States; Brittany Bowe; Mia Manganello; Greta Myers	3:00.19	+5.32
4	1	s	Germany; Josie Hofmann; Josephine Schlörb; Lea Sophie Scholz	3:00.53	+5.66
5	1	c	Italy; Francesca Lollobrigida; Arianna Fontana; Alice Marletti	3:01.87	+7.00
6	2	c	China; Ahenaer Adake; Yang Binyu; Han Mei	3:01.89	+7.02

=== Mixed events ===
==== Mixed relay ====
The race started on 2 March 2025 at 17:10

Rank	Heat	Country	Time	Diff
1st place, gold medalist(s)	1	Switzerland; Kaitlyn McGregor; Livio Wenger	2:59.09	
2nd place, silver medalist(s)	2	Spain; Sara Cabrera; Nil Llop Izquierdo	3:00.75	+1.66
3rd place, bronze medalist(s)	1	Poland; Martyna Baran; Mateusz Mikolajuk	3:01.30	+2.21
4	3	South Korea; Lee Na-hyun; Oh Hyun-min	3:01.49	+2.40
5	3	Canada; Ivanie Blondin; Anders Johnson	3:01.58	+2.49
6	3	Finland; Laura Kivioja; Tuukka Suomalainen	3:03.07	+3.98
7	2	Germany; Marlen Ehseluns; Hendrik Dombek	3;16.30	+17.21
8	3	China; Chen Xiangju; Quan Xianghe	3:23.65	+24.56
DQ	2	Netherlands; Angel Daleman; Wesly Dijs		
DQ	1	Czech Republic; Nikola Zdráhalová; Metodej Jilek		
