= List of Spanish records in speed skating =

The following are the national records in speed skating in Spain maintained by Federación Española de Deportes de Hielo (FEDH).

== Men ==
Event	Record	Athlete	Date	Meet	Place	Ref
500 meters	34.35	Nil Llop	17 October 2025	Oktoberfest Classic	Calgary, Canada	
500 meters	34.35	Nil Llop	22 November 2025	World Cup	Calgary, Canada	
500 meters × 2						
1000 meters	1:07.99	Nil Llop	18 October 2025	Oktoberfest Classic	Calgary, Canada	
1500 meters	1:47.10	Manuel Robla	15 November 2025	World Cup	Salt Lake City, United States	
3000 meters	3:47.62	Manuel Robla	21 February 2026	Junior World Cup	Inzell, Germany	
5000 meters	6:33.57	Manuel Robla	21 November 2025	World Cup	Calgary, Canada	
10000 meters	14:35.06	Asier Peña Iturria	27 January 2008	World Cup	Hamar, Norway	
Team sprint (3 laps)	1:22.09	Jhoan Sebastián Guzmán; Daniel Milagros; Nil Llop	23 February 2025	World Cup	Tomaszów Mazowiecki, Poland	
Team pursuit (8 laps)	4:09.33	Alexander Rezzonico; Manel Robla; Iván Roldán	25 November 2023	Neo-Senior World Cup	Baselga di Piné, Italy	
Sprint combination	140.270	Nil Llop	7–8 March 2024	World Sprint Championships	Inzell, Germany	
Small combination	170.536 pts	Asier Peña Iturria	3–4 March 2007	Norwegian Cup Final	Hamar, Norway	
Big combination	176.570 pts	Asier Peña Iturria	13–14 January 2007		Hamar, Norway	

== Women ==
Event	Record	Athlete	Date	Meet	Place	Ref
500 meters	38.57	Luisa González	16 December 2022	World Cup	Calgary, Canada	
500 meters × 2						
1000 meters	1:18.31	Sara Cabrera	14 November 2025	World Cup	Salt Lake City, United States	
1500 meters	2:03.26	Sara Cabrera	17 October 2025	Oktoberfest Classic	Calgary, Canada	
3000 meters	4:27.45	Abril del Río	21 February 2026	Junior World Cup	Inzell, Germany	
5000 meters						
10000 meters						
Team sprint (3 laps)	1:32.87	Oliegtnis Mercado; Ona Rodríguez; Sara Cabrera	25 January 2026	World Cup	Inzell, Germany	
Team pursuit (6 laps)	3:43.01	Paula Espín; Mireia Téllez; Mónica Seoane	30 November 2024	Junior World Cup	Tomaszów Mazowiecki, Poland	
Sprint combination	180.385 pts	Beatriu Gómez Franquet	4–5 February 2005	Alberto Nicolodi Trophy	Baselga di Pinè, Italy	
Mini combination	175.293 pts	Sara Cabrera	18–19 December 2020	Tatra Cup	Zakopane, Poland	
Small combination						

== Mixed ==
Event	Record	Athlete	Date	Meet	Place	Ref
Relay	2:59.65	Nil Llop; Luisa González	2 February 2025	World Cup	Milwaukee, United States	
