= 2024–25 ISU Speed Skating World Cup – World Cup 4 =

Ice skating competition in Milwaukee, Wisconsin

2024–25 ISU Speed Skating World Cup 4
- Venue: Pettit National Ice Center; Milwaukee; United States
- Dates: 31 January — 2 February 2025

The fourth competition weekend of the 2024–25 ISU Speed Skating World Cup took place at the Pettit National Ice Center in Milwaukee, United States, from Friday, 31 January to Sunday, 2 February 2025.

== Medal summary ==
=== Men's events ===
Event	Gold	Time	Silver	Time	Bronze	Time	Report
500 m (1)	Jordan Stolz; United States	33.91; TR	Jenning de Boo; Netherlands	34.28	Laurent Dubreuil; Canada	34.36	
500 m (2)	Tatsuya Shinhama; Japan	34.14	Jordan Stolz; United States	34.19	Laurent Dubreuil; Canada	34.35	
1000 m	Jordan Stolz; United States	1:06.16; TR	Jenning de Boo; Netherlands	1:07.33	Kjeld Nuis; Netherlands	1:07.44	
1500 m	Jordan Stolz; United States	1:41.46; TR	Kjeld Nuis; Netherlands	1:42.67	Peder Kongshaug; Norway	1:43.01	
5000 m	Sander Eitrem; Norway	6:04.74; TR	Davide Ghiotto; Italy	6:06.83	Beau Snellink; Netherlands	6:07.66	
Mass start^{A}	Jorrit Bergsma; Netherlands	66	Indra Medard; Belgium	42	Mathieu Belloir; France	21	
Team pursuit	United States; Casey Dawson; Ethan Cepuran; Emery Lehman	3:38.19	Italy; Davide Ghiotto; Michele Malfatti; Andrea Giovannini	3:39.29	Norway; Sander Eitrem; Peder Kongshaug; Hallgeir Engebråten	3:39.73	

^{A} In mass start, race points are accumulated during the race based on results of the intermediate sprints and the final sprint. The skater with most race points is the winner.

=== Women's events ===
Event	Gold	Time	Silver	Time	Bronze	Time	Report
500 m (1)	Femke Kok; Netherlands	37.11; TR	Erin Jackson; United States	37.39	Kurumi Inagawa; Japan	37.54	
500 m (2)	Femke Kok; Netherlands	37.02; TR	Erin Jackson; United States	37.45	Andżelika Wójcik; Poland	37.47	
1000 m	Miho Takagi; Japan	1:13.56; TR	Brittany Bowe; United States	1:14.23	Antoinette Rijpma-de Jong; Netherlands	1:14.44	
1500 m	Joy Beune; Netherlands	1:52.11; TR	Miho Takagi; Japan	1:52.82	Francesca Lollobrigida; Italy	1:52.92	
3000 m	Francesca Lollobrigida; Italy	3:54.73; TR	Ragne Wiklund; Norway	3:54.86	Joy Beune; Netherlands	3:55.86	
Mass start^{A}	Marijke Groenewoud; Netherlands	60	Francesca Lollobrigida; Italy	40	Mia Manganello; United States	20	
Team pursuit	Netherlands; Joy Beune; Antoinette Rijpma-de Jong; Marijke Groenewoud	2:54.27	Japan; Miho Takagi; Momoka Horikawa; Ayano Sato	2:55.82	United States; Brittany Bowe; Mia Manganello; Greta Myers	2:57.02	

^{A} In mass start, race points are accumulated during the race based on results of the intermediate sprints and the final sprint. The skater with most race points is the winner.

=== Mixed events ===
Event	Gold	Time	Silver	Time	Bronze	Time	Report
Mixed gender relay	Netherlands; Wesly Dijs; Angel Daleman	2:56.56	Norway; Bjørn Magnussen; Julie Nistad Samsonsen	2:58.01	Canada; Anders Johnson; Ivanie Blondin	2:58.01	

== Results ==
=== Men's events ===
==== 1st 500 m ====
The race started on 1 February 2025 at 13:58.

Rank	Pair	Lane	Name	Country	Time	Diff
1st place, gold medalist(s)	9	i	Jordan Stolz	United States	33.91; TR	
2nd place, silver medalist(s)	9	o	Jenning de Boo	Netherlands	34.28	+0.37
3rd place, bronze medalist(s)	10	o	Laurent Dubreuil	Canada	34.36	+0.45
4	6	o	Damian Żurek	Poland	34.43	+0.52
5	7	i	Marek Kania	Poland	34.52	+0.61
6	10	i	Tatsuya Shinhama	Japan	34.54	+0.63
7	6	i	Stefan Westenbroek	Netherlands	34.55	+0.64
8	8	o	Merijn Scheperkamp	Netherlands	34.55	+0.64
9	8	i	Cooper McLeod	United States	34.60	+0.69
10	5	o	Sebastian Diniz	Netherlands	34.62	+0.71
11	4	i	Bjørn Magnussen	Norway	34.66	+0.75
12	2	i	Anders Johson	Canada	34.72	+0.81
13	3	i	Piotr Michalski	Poland	34.74	+0.83
14	5	i	Wataru Morishige	Japan	34.77	+0.86
15	4	o	Zach Stoppelmoor	United States	34.79	+0.88
16	7	o	Marten Liiv	Estonia	34.90	+0.99
17	3	o	Lian Ziwen	China	34.95	+1.04
18	1	o	Christpoher Fiola	Canada	35.06	+1.15
19	1	i	David Bosa	Italy	35.09	+1.18
20	2	o	Liu Bin	China	35.29	+1.38

==== 2nd 500 m ====
The race started on 2 February 2025 at 14:58.

Rank	Pair	Lane	Name	Country	Time	Diff
1st place, gold medalist(s)	8	i	Tatsuya Shinhama	Japan	34.14	
2nd place, silver medalist(s)	8	o	Jordan Stolz	United States	34.19	+0.05
3rd place, bronze medalist(s)	10	o	Laurent Dubreuil	Canada	34.35	+0.21
4	7	o	Damian Żurek	Poland	34.39	+0.25
5	7	i	Merijn Scheperkamp	Netherlands	34.41	+0.27
6	10	i	Marek Kania	Poland	34.44	+0.30
7	5	o	Sebastian Diniz	Netherlands	34.45	+0.31
8	5	i	Wataru Morishige	Japan	34.46	+0.32
9	6	o	Marten Liiv	Estonia	34.48	+0.34
10	9	o	Jenning de Boo	Netherlands	34.53	+0.39
11	9	i	Cooper McLeod	United States	34.54	+0.40
12	2	i	Anders Johson	Canada	34.56	+0.42
13	6	i	Stefan Westenbroek	Netherlands	34.59	+0.45
14	4	i	Bjørn Magnussen	Norway	34.61	+0.47
15	3	i	Piotr Michalski	Poland	34.63	+0.49
16	1	i	Issa Gunji	Japan	34.71	+0.57
17	3	o	Lian Ziwen	China	34.72	+0.58
18	1	o	Henrik Fagerli Rukke	Norway	35.03	+0.89
19	2	o	Mats van den Bos	Netherlands	35.12	+0.98
20	4	o	Zach Stoppelmoor	United States	1:08.48	+34.34

==== 1000 m ====
The race started on 31 January 2025 at 19:47.

Rank	Pair	Lane	Name	Country	Time	Diff
1st place, gold medalist(s)	10	o	Jordan Stolz	United States	1:06.16; TR	
2nd place, silver medalist(s)	9	i	Jenning de Boo	Netherlands	1:07.33	+1.17
3rd place, bronze medalist(s)	8	o	Kjeld Nuis	Netherlands	1:07.44	+1.28
4	10	i	Cooper McLeod	United States	1:07.58	+1.42
5	5	i	Kim Min-seok	Hungary	1:07.82	+1.66
6	1	o	Hendrik Dombek	Germany	1:07.98	+1.82
7	6	i	Damian Żurek	Poland	1:08.05	+1.89
8	5	o	Joep Wennemars	Netherlands	1:08.09	+1.93
9	2	o	Connor Howe	Canada	1:08.11	+1.95
10	1	i	David Bosa	Italy	1:08.14	+1.98
11	6	o	Laurent Dubreuil	Canada	1:08.16	+2.00
12	2	i	Lian Ziwen	China	1:08.28	+2.12
13	7	o	Taiyo Nonomura	Japan	1:08.48	+2.32
14	3	i	Stefan Emele	Germany	1:08.60	+2.44
15	4	i	Moritz Klein	Germany	1:08.65	+2.49
16	3	o	Mathias Vosté	Belgium	1:08.74	+2.58
17	4	o	Zach Stoppelmoor	United States	1:08.99	+2.83
18	8	i	Marten Liiv	Estonia	1:09.20	+3.04
19	7	i	Tatsuya Shinhama	Japan	1:09.58	+3.42
20	9	o	Tim Prins	Netherlands	1:37.63	+31.47

==== 1500 m ====
The race started on 1 February 2025 at 15:17.

Rank	Pair	Lane	Name	Country	Time	Diff
1st place, gold medalist(s)	9	o	Jordan Stolz	United States	1:41.46; TR	
2nd place, silver medalist(s)	9	i	Kjeld Nuis	Netherlands	1:42.67	+1.21
3rd place, bronze medalist(s)	10	i	Peder Kongshaug	Norway	1:43.01	+1.55
4	8	o	Tim Prins	Netherlands	1:43.35	+1.89
5	10	o	Kim Min-seok	Hungary	1:43.64	+2.18
6	8	i	Sander Eitrem	Norway	1:43.66	+2.20
7	6	i	Connor Howe	Canada	1:43.67	+2.21
8	4	o	Wesly Dijs	Netherlands	1:44.13	+2.67
9	3	o	Daniele Di Stefano	Italy	1:44.38	+2.92
10	4	i	Tijmen Snel	Netherlands	1:44.54	+3.08
11	1	o	Hendrik Dombek	Germany	1:44.93	+3.47
12	7	i	Taiyo Nonomura	Japan	1:45.06	+3.60
13	1	i	Liu Hanbin	China	1:45.15	+3.69
14	5	o	Bart Swings	Belgium	1:45.17	+3.71
15	5	i	Stefan Emele	Germany	1:45.18	+3.72
16	2	i	David La Rue	Canada	1:45.23	+3.77
17	2	o	Emery Lehman	United States	1:45.27	+3.81
18	7	o	Seitaro Ichinohe	Japan	1:45.92	+4.46
19	6	o	Kazuya Yamada	Japan	1:46.02	+4.56
20	3	i	Joep Wennemars	Netherlands	1:46.23	+4.77

==== 5000 m ====
The race started on 31 January 2025 at 17:56.

Rank	Pair	Lane	Name	Country	Time	Diff
1st place, gold medalist(s)	7	o	Sander Eitrem	Norway	6:04.74; TR	
2nd place, silver medalist(s)	8	i	Davide Ghiotto	Italy	6:06.83	+2.09
3rd place, bronze medalist(s)	8	o	Beau Snellink	Netherlands	6:07.66	+2.92
4	5	i	Casey Dawson	United States	6:07.93	+3.19
5	5	o	Ted-Jan Bloemen	Canada	6:08.65	+3.91
6	4	o	Marcel Bosker	Netherlands	6:08.98	+4.24
7	3	i	Timothy Loubineaud	France	6:09.61	+4.87
8	4	i	Michele Malfatti	Italy	6:11.60	+6.86
9	6	i	Bart Swings	Belgium	6:12.34	+7.60
10	3	o	Felix Maly	Germany	6:12.97	+8.23
11	6	o	Chris Huizinga	Netherlands	6:12.98	+8.24
12	1	o	Jorrit Bergsma	Netherlands	6:14.28	+9.54
13	7	i	Graeme Fish	Canada	6:15.51	+10.77
14	2	i	Patrick Beckert	Germany	6:18.15	+13.41
15	2	o	Wu Yu	China	6:19.41	+14.67
16	1	i	Seitaro Ichinohe	Japan	6:25.28	+20.54

==== Mass start ====
The race started on 2 February 2025 at 16:02.

Rank	Name	Country	Points	Time
1st place, gold medalist(s)	Jorrit Bergsma	Netherlands	66	8:03.47
2nd place, silver medalist(s)	Indra Medard	Belgium	42	8:03.71
3rd place, bronze medalist(s)	Mathieu Belloir	France	21	8:06.78
4	Bart Swings	Belgium	13	8:06.84
5	Andrea Giovannini	Italy	7	8:06.93
6	Daniele Di Stefano	Italy	3	8:07.34
7	Timothy Loubineaud	France	3	8:08.29
8	Fridtjof Petzold	Germany	2	8:10.18
9	Livio Wenger	Switzerland		8:07.67
10	Bart Hoolwerf	Netherlands		8:07.83
11	David La Rue	Canada		8:08.07
12	Marcin Bachanek	Poland		8:08.09
13	Shomu Sasaki	Japan		8:08.93
14	Gabriel Odor	Austria		8:09.20
15	Ethan Cepuran	United States		8:09.58
16	Allan Dahl Johansson	Norway		8:15.29
17	Peter Michael	New Zealand		8:17.82
18	Szymon Palka	Poland		8:33.26
19	Liu Hanbin	China		3:54.25
20	Felix Maly	Germany		1:28.82

==== Team pursuit ====
The race started on 2 February 2025 at 13:57.

Rank	Pair	Lane	Country	Time	Diff
1st place, gold medalist(s)	3	s	United States; Casey Dawson; Ethan Cepuran; Emery Lehman	3:38.19	
2nd place, silver medalist(s)	3	c	Italy; Davide Ghiotto; Michele Malfatti; Andrea Giovannini	3:39.29	+1.10
3rd place, bronze medalist(s)	2	s	Norway; Sander Eitrem; Peder Kongshaug; Hallgeir Engebråten	3:39.73	+1.54
4	1	c	Netherlands; Chris Huizinga; Beau Snellink; Bart Hoolwerf	3:39.92	+1.73
5	2	c	Japan; Seitaro Ichinohe; Riku Tsuchiya; Shomu Sasaki	3:43.65	+5.46
6	1	s	Canada; Jake Weidemann; Connor Howe; Ted-Jan Bloemen	3:44.34	+6.15

=== Women's events ===
==== 1st 500 m ====
The race started on 1 February 2025 at 13:30.

Rank	Pair	Lane	Name	Country	Time	Diff
1st place, gold medalist(s)	1	i	Femke Kok	Netherlands	37.11; TR	
2nd place, silver medalist(s)	10	o	Erin Jackson	United States	37.39	+0.28
3rd place, bronze medalist(s)	7	i	Kurumi Inagawa	Japan	37.54	+0.43
4	9	i	Andżelika Wójcik	Poland	37.66	+0.55
5	7	o	Kaja Ziomek-Nogal	Poland	37.66	+0.55
6	8	o	Dione Voskamp	Netherlands	37.71	+0.60
7	6	o	Brittany Bowe	United States	37.81	+0.70
8	6	i	Jutta Leerdam	Netherlands	37.82	+0.71
9	8	i	Yukino Yoshida	Japan	37.84	+0.73
10	10	i	Suzanne Schulting	Netherlands	37.91	+0.80
11	5	o	Vanessa Herzog	Austria	37.96	+0.85
12	9	o	Kimi Goetz	United States	38.04	+0.93
13	4	i	Naomi Verkerk	Netherlands	38.06	+0.95
14	2	o	Sophie Warmuth	Germany	38.09	+0.98
15	3	i	Serena Pergher	Italy	38.12	+1.01
16	5	i	Carolina Hiller	Canada	38.40	+1.29
17	3	o	Julie Nistad Samsonsen	Norway	38.42	+1.31
18	4	o	Karolina Bosiek	Poland	38.46	+1.35
19	1	o	Wang Jingziqian	China	38.52	+1.41
20	2	i	Kako Yamane	Japan	38.82	+1.71

==== 2nd 500 m ====
The race started on 2 February 2025 at 14:30.

Rank	Pair	Lane	Name	Country	Time	Diff
1st place, gold medalist(s)	3	i	Femke Kok	Netherlands	37.02; TR	
2nd place, silver medalist(s)	10	o	Erin Jackson	United States	37.45	+0.43
3rd place, bronze medalist(s)	8	i	Andżelika Wójcik	Poland	37.47	+0.45
4	9	i	Yukino Yoshida	Japan	37.49	+0.47
5	10	i	Dione Voskamp	Netherlands	37.61	+0.59
6	8	o	Suzanne Schulting	Netherlands	37.65	+0.63
7	7	o	Kaja Ziomek-Nogal	Poland	37.67	+0.65
8	6	i	Jutta Leerdam	Netherlands	37.70	+0.68
9	9	o	Kurumi Inagawa	Japan	37.77	+0.75
10	4	o	Serena Pergher	Italy	37.98	+0.96
11	6	o	Vanessa Herzog	Austria	38.10	+1.08
12	2	i	Sophie Warmuth	Germany	38.10	+1.08
13	5	o	Naomi Verkerk	Netherlands	38.12	+1.10
14	1	o	Anna Ostlender	Germany	38.33	+1.31
15	4	i	Karolina Bosiek	Poland	38.40	+1.38
16	3	o	Julie Nistad Samsonsen	Norway	38.41	+1.39
17	5	i	Carolina Hiller	Canada	38.41	+1.39
18	7	i	Kimi Goetz	United States	38.59	+1.57
19	2	o	Yu Shihui	China	38.64	+1.62
20	1	i	Fran Vanhoutte	Belgium	38.73	+1.71

==== 1000 m ====
The race started on 31 January 2025 at 19:14.

Rank	Pair	Lane	Name	Country	Time	Diff
1st place, gold medalist(s)	10	o	Miho Takagi	Japan	1:13.56; TR	
2nd place, silver medalist(s)	8	i	Brittany Bowe	United States	1:14.23	+0.67
3rd place, bronze medalist(s)	8	o	Antoinette Rijpma-de Jong	Netherlands	1:14.44	+0.88
4	10	i	Kimi Goetz	United States	1:14.78	+1.22
5	3	i	Marrit Fledderus	Netherlands	1:14.98	+1.42
6	9	o	Angel Daleman	Netherlands	1:15.01	+1.45
7	5	i	Yukino Yoshida	Japan	1:15.18	+1.62
8	7	o	Natalia Jabrzyk	Poland	1:15.35	+1.79
9	6	i	Ayano Sato	Japan	1:15.44	+1.88
10	2	o	Isabelle van Elst	Belgium	1:15.81	+2.25
11	4	i	Andżelika Wójcik	Poland	1:15.82	+2.26
12	5	o	Vanessa Herzog	Austria	1:15.94	+2.38
13	3	o	Lea Sophie Scholz	Germany	1:15.96	+2.40
14	7	i	Suzanne Schulting	Netherlands	1:15.97	+2.41
15	2	i	Sofia Thorup-Prosvirnova	Denmark	1:16.14	+2.58
16	4	o	Karolina Bosiek	Poland	1:16.32	+2.76
17	6	o	Béatrice Lamarche	Canada	1:16.39	+2.83
18	1	i	Mia Manganello	United States	1:16.95	+3.39
19	1	o	Rin Kosaka	Japan	1:16.98	+3.42
20	9	i	Jutta Leerdam	Netherlands	2:48.90	+1:35.34

==== 1500 m ====
The race started on 1 February 2025 at 14:37.

Rank	Pair	Lane	Name	Country	Time	Diff
1st place, gold medalist(s)	10	o	Joy Beune	Netherlands	1:52.11; TR	
2nd place, silver medalist(s)	9	i	Miho Takagi	Japan	1:52.82	+0.71
3rd place, bronze medalist(s)	6	i	Francesca Lollobrigida	Italy	1:52.92	+0.81
4	7	o	Ragne Wiklund	Norway	1:53.81	+1.70
5	5	i	Yang Binyu	China	1:53.98	+1.87
6	10	i	Brittany Bowe	United States	1:54.12	+2.01
7	8	i	Ivanie Blondin	Canada	1:54.16	+2.05
8	9	o	Antoinette Rijpma-de Jong	Netherlands	1:54.36	+2.25
9	1	o	Nikola Zdráhalová	Czech Republic	1:54.53	+2.42
10	7	i	Marijke Groenewoud	Netherlands	1:54.75	+2.64
11	2	i	Ayano Sato	Japan	1:55.07	+2.96
12	5	o	Isabelle van Elst	Belgium	1:55.58	+3.47
13	4	i	Greta Myers	United States	1:55.58	+3.47
14	4	o	Melissa Wijfje	Netherlands	1:55.75	+3.64
15	3	o	Martina Sábliková	Czech Republic	1:55.91	+3.80
16	1	i	Lea Sophie Scholz	Germany	1:56.02	+3.91
17	6	o	Valérie Maltais	Canada	1:56.32	+4.21
18	8	o	Angel Daleman	Netherlands	1:56.59	+4.48
19	3	i	Momoka Horikawa	Japan	1:56.83	+4.72
20	2	o	Kimi Goetz	United States	1:57.36	+5.25

==== 3000 m ====
The race started on 31 January 2025 at 17:00.

Rank	Pair	Lane	Name	Country	Time	Diff
1st place, gold medalist(s)	5	i	Francesca Lollobrigida	Italy	3:54.73; TR	
2nd place, silver medalist(s)	7	i	Ragne Wiklund	Norway	3:54.86	+0.13
3rd place, bronze medalist(s)	7	o	Joy Beune	Netherlands	3:55.86	+1.13
4	6	i	Martina Sábliková	Czech Republic	3:57.45	+2.72
5	5	o	Marijke Groenewoud	Netherlands	3:58.09	+3.36
6	4	o	Valérie Maltais	Canada	3:59.74	+5.01
7	3	i	Momoka Horikawa	Japan	4:00.58	+5.85
8	6	o	Merel Conijn	Netherlands	4:00.76	+6.03
9	8	o	Isabelle Weidemann	Canada	4:01.07	+6.34
10	1	i	Josie Hofmann	Germany	4:01.22	+6.49
11	3	o	Yang Binyu	China	4:01.63	+6.90
12	4	i	Sanne In 't Hof	Netherlands	4:01.86	+7.13
13	8	i	Ivanie Blondin	Canada	4:03.89	+9.16
14	2	o	Laura Hall	Canada	4:04.31	+9.58
15	2	i	Sandrine Tas	Belgium	4:05.57	+10.84
16	1	o	Maira Jasch	Germany	4:06.20	+11.47

==== Mass start ====
The race started on 2 February 2025 at 15:41.

Rank	Name	Country	Points	Time
1st place, gold medalist(s)	Marijke Groenewoud	Netherlands	60	8:26.92
2nd place, silver medalist(s)	Francesca Lollobrigida	Italy	40	8:27.20
3rd place, bronze medalist(s)	Mia Manganello	United States	20	8:27.35
4	Yang Binyu	China	10	8:28.09
4	Ayano Sato	Japan	10	8:28.09
6	Jin Wenjing	China	6	8:29.60
7	Natalia Jabrzyk	Poland	5	8:29.88
8	Alice Marletti	Italy	4	8:32.92
9	Michelle Uhrig	Germany	3	8:30.70
10	Kaitlyn McGregor	Switzerland	3	8:34.09
11	Ramona Härdi	Switzerland	3	8:45.14
12	Valérie Maltais	Canada	2	9:18.24
13	Greta Myers	United States	1	8:31.84
14	Fran Vanhoutte	Belgium		8:31.98
15	Violette Braun	France		8:32.18
16	Josie Hofmann	Germany		8:33.52
17	Zuzana Kuršová	Czech Republic		8:34.19
18	Ivanie Blondin	Canada		8:44.39
19	Aurora Grinden Løvås	Norway		8:53.11
20	Sandrine Tas	Belgium		3:52.80

==== Team pursuit ====
The race started on 2 February 2025 at 13:30.

Rank	Pair	Lane	Country	Time	Diff
1st place, gold medalist(s)	2	s	Netherlands; Joy Beune; Antoinette Rijpma-de Jong; Marijke Groenewoud	2:54.27	
2nd place, silver medalist(s)	3	c	Japan; Miho Takagi; Momoka Horikawa; Ayano Sato	2:55.82	+1.55
3rd place, bronze medalist(s)	3	s	United States; Brittany Bowe; Mia Manganello; Greta Myers	2:57.02	+2.75
4	1	s	China; Yang Binyu; Jin Wenjing; Adake Ahenaer	2:59.09	+4.82
5	2	c	Germany; Josie Hofmann; Josephine Schlörb; Lea Sophie Scholz	2:59.43	+5.16
6	1	c	Canada; Valérie Maltais; Ivanie Blondin; Isabelle Weidemann	3:00.23	+5.96

=== Mixed events ===
==== Mixed relay ====
The race started on 2 February 2025 at 16:30.

Rank	Heat	Country	Time	Diff
1st place, gold medalist(s)	3	Netherlands; Wesly Dijs; Angel Daleman	2:56.56	
2nd place, silver medalist(s)	3	Norway; Bjørn Magnussen; Julie Nistad Samsonsen	2:58.01	+1.45
3rd place, bronze medalist(s)	3	Canada; Anders Johnson; Ivanie Blondin	2:58.01	+1.45
4	2	Germany; Hendrik Dombek; Anna Ostlender	2:58.56	+2.00
5	2	United States; Carl Platt; Sarah Warren	2:59.65	+3.09
6	2	Spain; Nil Llop; Luisa María González	2:59.65	+3.09
7	2	Czech Republic; Jakub Kočí; Nikola Zdráhalová	3:01.22	+4.66
8	3	Italy; Riccardo Lorello; Serena Pergher	3:01.37	+4.81
9	1	Poland; Jakub Piotrowski; Martyna Baran	3:03.97	+7.41
10	1	Switzerland; Severin Widmer; Nadja Wenger	3:11.75	+15.19
	1	China; Quan Xianghe; Xi Dongxue	Did not finish	
