= 2025 World Single Distances Speed Skating Championships – Men's 500 metres =

Men's 500 metres at the 2025 World Single Distances Speed Skating Championships
- Venue: Vikingskipet
- Location: Hamar, Norway
- Dates: 14 March
- Competitors: 24 from 11 nations
- Winning time: 34.24

Medalists
gold medal	Jenning de Boo	Netherlands
silver medal	Jordan Stolz	United States
bronze medal	Cooper McLeod	United States

The Men's 500 metres competition at the 2025 World Single Distances Speed Skating Championships took place on 14 March 2025.

== Qualification ==
A total of 24 entry quotas were available for the event, with a maximum of three per country. The entry quotas were assigned to countries following a Special Qualification Ranking List based on rankings and performances of skaters during the 2024–25 ISU Speed Skating World Cup. Eligible skaters had to have met the qualification time of 36.60 at valid International Skating Union (ISU) events after 1 July 2023.

== Records ==
Prior to this competition, the existing world and track records were as follows.

	Time	Athlete	Date
World Record	33.61	Pavel Kulizhnikov (RUS)	9 March 2019
Track Record	34.31	Jeremy Wotherspoon (CAN)	26 January 2008

== Results ==
The race was started at 20:55.

Rank	Pair	Lane	Name	Country	Time	Diff
1st place, gold medalist(s)	12	i	Jenning de Boo	Netherlands	34.24; TR	
2nd place, silver medalist(s)	11	i	Jordan Stolz	United States	34.38	+0.14
3rd place, bronze medalist(s)	11	o	Cooper McLeod	United States	34.52	+0.28
4	10	i	Laurent Dubreuil	Canada	34.53	+0.29
5	7	o	Wataru Morishige	Japan	34.54	+0.30
6	10	o	Tatsuya Shinhama	Japan	34.59	+0.35
7	9	i	Damian Żurek	Poland	34.61	+0.37
8	8	i	Yevgeniy Koshkin	Kazakhstan	34.63	+0.39
9	12	o	Marek Kania	Poland	34.72	+0.48
10	9	o	Kim Jun-ho	South Korea	34.73	+0.49
11	8	o	Merijn Scheperkamp	Netherlands	34.85	+0.61
12	2	o	Cho Sang-hyeok	South Korea	34.91	+0.67
13	4	o	Ryota Kojima	Japan	34.93	+0.69
14	7	i	Marten Liiv	Estonia	34.95	+0.71
15	4	i	Bjørn Magnussen	Norway	35.04	+0.80
16	5	o	Piotr Michalski	Poland	35.06	+0.82
17	6	o	Lian Ziwen	China	35.09	+0.85
18	6	i	Zach Stoppelmoor	United States	35.19	+0.95
19	3	o	Xue Zhiwen	China	35.39	+1.15
20	2	i	Christopher Fiola	Canada	35.42	+1.18
21	5	i	Anders Johnson	Canada	35.45	+1.21
22	3	i	Kim Tae-yun	South Korea	35.53	+1.29
23	1	i	David Bosa	Italy	35.65	+1.41
	1	o	Janno Botman	Netherlands	Did not finish	
