= 2025 World Single Distances Speed Skating Championships – Men's team sprint =

Men's team sprint at the 2025 World Single Distances Speed Skating Championships
- Venue: Vikingskipet
- Location: Hamar, Norway
- Dates: 13 March
- Competitors: 24 from 8 nations
- Teams: 8
- Winning time: 1:18.13

Medalists
gold medal	Xue Zhiwen; Lian Ziwen; Ning Zhongyan	China
silver medal	Janno Botman; Jenning de Boo; Tim Prins	Netherlands
bronze medal	Austin Kleba; Cooper McLeod; Zach Stoppelmoor	United States

The Men's team sprint competition at the 2025 World Single Distances Speed Skating Championships took place on 13 March 2025.

== Qualification ==
A total of eight entry quotas were available for the event, with a maximum of one per country. The entry quotas were assigned to countries following a Special Qualification Ranking List based on World Cup points and times during the 2024–25 ISU Speed Skating World Cup.

== Records ==
Prior to this competition, the existing world and track records were as follows.

	Time	Team	Date
World Record	1:16.98	United States	26 January 2025
Track Record	1:20.01	Norway	5 March 2022

== Results ==
The race was started at 21:13.

Rank	Pair	Lane	Country	Time	Diff
1st place, gold medalist(s)	3	s	China; Xue Zhiwen; Lian Ziwen; Ning Zhongyan	1:18.13; TR	
2nd place, silver medalist(s)	4	s	Netherlands; Janno Botman; Jenning de Boo; Tim Prins	1:18.42	+0.29
3rd place, bronze medalist(s)	4	c	United States; Austin Kleba; Cooper McLeod; Zach Stoppelmoor	1:19.23	+1.10
4	1	c	Norway; Henrik Fagerli Rukke; Bjørn Magnussen; Didrik Eng Strand	1:19.32	+1.19
5	1	s	Poland; Marek Kania; Piotr Michalski; Damian Żurek	1:19.68	+1.55
6	2	c	Canada; Laurent Dubreuil; Anders Johnson; Connor Howe	1:19.86	+1.73
7	3	c	South Korea; Kim Jun-ho; Cha Min-kyu; Cho Sang-hyeok	1:20.04	+1.91
8	2	s	Germany; Hendrik Dombek; Moritz Klein; Stefan Emele	1:20.42	+2.29
