= 2024 World Sprint Speed Skating Championships – Men =

Men at the 2024 World Sprint Speed Skating Championships
- Venue: Max Aicher Arena
- Location: Inzell, Germany
- Dates: 7–8 March
- Competitors: 28 from 16 nations
- Winning points: 136.680

Medalists
gold medal	Ning Zhongyan	China
silver medal	Jenning de Boo	Netherlands
bronze medal	Laurent Dubreuil	Canada

The Men competition at the 2024 World Sprint Speed Skating Championships was held on 7 and 8 March 2024.

== Results ==
=== 500 m ===
The race was started on 7 March at 19:37.

Rank	Pair	Lane	Name	Country	Time	Diff
1	14	O	Laurent Dubreuil	Canada	34.47	
2	13	O	Marek Kania	Poland	34.56	+0.09
3	13	I	Jenning de Boo	Netherlands	34.65	+0.18
4	11	O	Cho Sang-hyeok	South Korea	34.81	+0.34
5	5	O	Ning Zhongyan	China	34.82	+0.35
5	14	I	Kim Jun-ho	South Korea	34.82	+0.35
7	5	I	Koo Kyung-min	South Korea	34.89	+0.42
8	4	I	Hendrik Dombek	Germany	34.93	+0.46
9	3	I	Kjeld Nuis	Netherlands	34.96	+0.49
10	11	I	Ryota Kojima	Japan	34.97	+0.50
11	6	I	Du Haonan	China	35.00	+0.53
12	12	O	Marten Liiv	Estonia	35.06	+0.59
13	12	I	Bjørn Magnussen	Norway	35.07	+0.60
14	10	O	David Bosa	Italy	35.10	+0.63
15	10	I	Håvard Holmefjord Lorentzen	Norway	35.15	+0.68
16	9	O	Joep Wennemars	Netherlands	35.18	+0.71
17	4	O	Moritz Klein	Germany	35.22	+0.75
17	8	I	Zach Stoppelmoor	United States	35.22	+0.75
19	7	O	Piotr Michalski	Poland	35.34	+0.87
20	6	O	Mathias Vosté	Belgium	35.37	+0.90
20	9	I	Nil Llop	Spain	35.37	+0.90
22	1	O	Stefan Emele	Germany	35.75	+1.28
23	2	I	Ignaz Gschwentner	Austria	35.82	+1.35
24	7	I	Yankun Zhao	Canada	35.85	+1.38
25	2	O	Alessio Trentini	Italy	35.93	+1.46
26	1	I	Altaj Zjardembekuly	Kazakhstan	36.01	+1.54
26	3	O	Tuukka Suomalainen	Finland	36.01	+1.54
26	8	O	Henrik Fagerli Rukke	Norway	36.01	+1.54

=== 1000 m ===
The race was started on 7 March at 21:24.

Rank	Pair	Lane	Name	Country	Time	Diff
1	12	O	Ning Zhongyan	China	1:07.67	
2	11	O	Mathias Vosté	Belgium	1:07.85	+0.18
3	13	I	Kjeld Nuis	Netherlands	1:07.90	+0.23
4	9	I	Håvard Holmefjord Lorentzen	Norway	1:08.28	+0.61
4	14	I	Jenning de Boo	Netherlands	1:08.28	+0.61
6	14	O	Laurent Dubreuil	Canada	1:08.31	+0.64
7	12	I	Marten Liiv	Estonia	1:08.44	+0.77
8	7	I	Moritz Klein	Germany	1:08.45	+0.78
9	7	O	Hendrik Dombek	Germany	1:08.66	+0.99
10	6	I	Zach Stoppelmoor	United States	1:08.76	+1.09
10	8	I	Cho Sang-hyeok	South Korea	1:08.76	+1.09
12	10	O	Ryota Kojima	Japan	1:08.77	+1.10
13	13	O	David Bosa	Italy	1:08.91	+1.24
14	5	I	Koo Kyung-min	South Korea	1:08.94	+1.27
15	6	O	Marek Kania	Poland	1:09.16	+1.49
16	4	O	Alessio Trentini	Italy	1:09.27	+1.60
17	1	O	Stefan Emele	Germany	1:09.54	+1.87
18	3	I	Bjørn Magnussen	Norway	1:09.62	+1.95
19	11	I	Piotr Michalski	Poland	1:09.70	+2.03
20	8	O	Du Haonan	China	1:09.82	+2.15
21	5	O	Nil Llop	Spain	1:09.83	+2.16
22	9	O	Yankun Zhao	Canada	1:11.04	+3.37
23	4	I	Henrik Fagerli Rukke	Norway	1:11.05	+3.38
24	2	I	Altaj Zjardembekuly	Kazakhstan	1:11.14	+3.47
25	3	O	Ignaz Gschwentner	Austria	1:11.31	+3.64
26	2	O	Kim Jun-ho	South Korea	1:11.52	+3.85
27	1	I	Tuukka Suomalainen	Finland	1:12.21	+4.54
28	10	I	Joep Wennemars	Netherlands	1:43.89	+36.22

=== 500 m ===
The race was started on 8 March at 19:07.

Rank	Pair	Lane	Name	Country	Time	Diff
1	14	O	Jenning de Boo	Netherlands	34.27	
2	13	I	Ning Zhongyan	China	34.47	+0.20
2	14	I	Laurent Dubreuil	Canada	34.47	+0.20
4	7	O	Bjørn Magnussen	Norway	34.57	+0.30
5	10	O	Ryota Kojima	Japan	34.62	+0.35
6	12	I	Marek Kania	Poland	34.64	+0.37
7	4	O	Kim Jun-ho	South Korea	34.72	+0.45
8	7	I	David Bosa	Italy	34.73	+0.46
8	11	O	Håvard Holmefjord Lorentzen	Norway	34.73	+0.46
10	6	O	Du Haonan	China	34.77	+0.50
11	6	I	Piotr Michalski	Poland	34.78	+0.51
12	1	I	Joep Wennemars	Netherlands	34.80	+0.53
13	11	I	Cho Sang-hyeok	South Korea	34.81	+0.54
14	9	O	Koo Kyung-min	South Korea	34.86	+0.59
15	10	I	Marten Liiv	Estonia	34.87	+0.60
16	8	O	Zach Stoppelmoor	United States	34.96	+0.69
17	13	O	Kjeld Nuis	Netherlands	34.97	+0.70
18	9	I	Mathias Vosté	Belgium	34.98	+0.71
19	3	O	Yankun Zhao	Canada	35.25	+0.98
20	8	I	Moritz Klein	Germany	35.26	+0.99
21	12	O	Hendrik Dombek	Germany	35.37	+1.10
22	5	O	Nil Llop	Spain	35.38	+1.11
23	1	O	Altaj Zjardembekuly	Kazakhstan	35.54	+1.27
24	3	I	Henrik Fagerli Rukke	Norway	35.72	+1.45
25	2	O	Ignaz Gschwentner	Austria	35.84	+1.57
26	5	I	Stefan Emele	Germany	35.96	+1.69
27	4	I	Alessio Trentini	Italy	36.02	+1.75
	2	I	Tuukka Suomalainen	Finland	Disqualified	

=== 1000 m ===
The race was started on 8 March at 20:50.

Rank	Pair	Lane	Name	Country	Time	Diff
1	13	I	Ning Zhongyan	China	1:07.11 TR	
2	10	I	Mathias Vosté	Belgium	1:07.50	+0.39
3	13	O	Kjeld Nuis	Netherlands	1:07.65	+0.54
4	2	O	Joep Wennemars	Netherlands	1:07.74	+0.63
5	10	O	Marten Liiv	Estonia	1:07.80	+0.69
6	11	O	Håvard Holmefjord Lorentzen	Norway	1:07.91	+0.80
7	8	I	Hendrik Dombek	Germany	1:07.93	+0.82
7	9	O	Koo Kyung-min	South Korea	1:07.93	+0.82
9	14	O	Jenning de Boo	Netherlands	1:07.98	+0.87
10	9	I	David Bosa	Italy	1:08.03	+0.92
11	11	I	Ryota Kojima	Japan	1:08.09	+0.98
12	12	O	Cho Sang-hyeok	South Korea	1:08.14	+1.03
13	6	O	Moritz Klein	Germany	1:08.17	+1.06
14	5	O	Piotr Michalski	Poland	1:08.47	+1.36
15	3	I	Alessio Trentini	Italy	1:08.65	+1.54
16	8	O	Bjørn Magnussen	Norway	1:08.79	+1.68
17	14	I	Laurent Dubreuil	Canada	1:08.84	+1.73
18	4	I	Stefan Emele	Germany	1:08.92	+1.81
19	7	O	Zach Stoppelmoor	United States	1:08.94	+1.83
20	12	I	Marek Kania	Poland	1:08.95	+1.84
21	5	I	Nil Llop	Spain	1:09.21	+2.10
22	7	I	Du Haonan	China	1:09.37	+2.26
23	2	I	Yankun Zhao	Canada	1:09.89	+2.78
24	3	O	Henrik Fagerli Rukke	Norway	1:09.92	+2.81
25	6	I	Kim Jun-ho	South Korea	1:10.15	+3.04
26	1	I	Ignaz Gschwentner	Austria	1:11.79	+4.68
	4	O	Altaj Zjardembekuly	Kazakhstan	Disqualified	

=== Overall standings ===
After all events.

Rank	Name	Country	500m	1000m	500m	1000m	Points	Diff
1st place, gold medalist(s)	Ning Zhongyan	China	34.82	1:07.67	34.47	1:07.11	136.680	
2nd place, silver medalist(s)	Jenning de Boo	Netherlands	34.65	1:08.28	34.27	1:07.98	137.050	+0.74
3rd place, bronze medalist(s)	Laurent Dubreuil	Canada	34.47	1:08.31	34.47	1:08.84	137.515	+1.67
4	Kjeld Nuis	Netherlands	34.96	1:07.90	34.97	1:07.65	137.705	+2.05
5	Håvard Holmefjord Lorentzen	Norway	35.15	1:08.28	34.73	1:07.91	137.975	+2.59
6	Ryota Kojima	Japan	34.97	1:08.77	34.62	1:08.09	138.020	+2.68
7	Mathias Vosté	Belgium	35.37	1:07.85	34.98	1:07.50	138.025	+2.69
8	Marten Liiv	Estonia	35.06	1:08.44	34.87	1:07.80	138.050	+2.74
9	Cho Sang-hyeok	South Korea	34.81	1:08.76	34.81	1:08.14	138.070	+2.78
10	Koo Kyung-min	South Korea	34.89	1:08.94	34.86	1:07.93	138.185	+3.01
11	Marek Kania	Poland	34.56	1:09.16	34.64	1:08.95	138.255	+3.15
12	David Bosa	Italy	35.10	1:08.91	34.73	1:08.03	138.300	+3.24
13	Hendrik Dombek	Germany	34.93	1:08.66	35.37	1:07.93	138.595	+3.83
14	Moritz Klein	Germany	35.22	1:08.45	35.26	1:08.17	138.790	+4.22
15	Bjørn Magnussen	Norway	35.07	1:09.62	34.57	1:08.79	138.845	+4.33
16	Zach Stoppelmoor	United States	35.22	1:08.76	34.96	1:08.94	139.030	+4.70
17	Piotr Michalski	Poland	35.34	1:09.70	34.78	1:08.47	139.205	+5.05
18	Du Haonan	China	35.00	1:09.82	34.77	1:09.37	139.365	+5.37
19	Nil Llop	Spain	35.37	1:09.83	35.38	1:09.21	140.270	+7.18
20	Kim Jun-ho	South Korea	34.82	1:11.52	34.72	1:10.15	140.375	+7.39
21	Alessio Trentini	Italy	35.93	1:09.27	36.02	1:08.65	140.910	+8.46
22	Stefan Emele	Germany	35.75	1:09.54	35.96	1:08.92	140.940	+8.52
23	Yankun Zhao	Canada	35.85	1:11.04	35.25	1:09.89	141.565	+9.77
24	Henrik Fagerli Rukke	Norway	36.01	1:11.05	35.72	1:09.92	142.215	+11.07
25	Ignaz Gschwentner	Austria	35.82	1:11.31	35.84	1:11.79	143.210	+13.06
26	Joep Wennemars	Netherlands	35.18	1:43.89	34.80	1:07.74	155.795	+38.23
–	Altaj Zjardembekuly	Kazakhstan	36.01	1:11.14	35.54	DQ	Did not finish	
–	Tuukka Suomalainen	Finland	36.01	1:12.21	DQ	DNS	Did not finish	
