= 2024 European Speed Skating Championships – Men's 1000 metres =

Men's 1000 metres at the 2024 European Speed Skating Championships
- Venue: Thialf
- Location: Heerenveen, Netherlands
- Dates: 5 January
- Competitors: 20 from 11 nations
- Winning time: 1:07.87

Medalists
gold medal	Kjeld Nuis	Netherlands
silver medal	Jenning de Boo	Netherlands
bronze medal	Tim Prins	Netherlands

The men's 1000 metres competition at the 2024 European Speed Skating Championships was held on 5 January 2024.

== Results ==
The race was started at 21:30.

Rank	Pair	Lane	Name	Country	Time	Diff
1st place, gold medalist(s)	9	i	Kjeld Nuis	Netherlands	1:07.87	
2nd place, silver medalist(s)	6	i	Jenning de Boo	Netherlands	1:08.14	+0.27
3rd place, bronze medalist(s)	8	o	Tim Prins	Netherlands	1:08.20	+0.33
4	9	o	Marten Liiv	Estonia	1:08.41	+0.54
5	8	i	Moritz Klein	Germany	1:08.77	+0.90
6	4	o	Marek Kania	Poland	1:08.832	+0.96
7	5	o	David Bosa	Italy	1:08.834	+0.96
8	10	i	Damian Żurek	Poland	1:08.88	+1.01
9	6	o	Hendrik Dombek	Germany	1:09.13	+1.26
10	5	i	Piotr Michalski	Poland	1:09.30	+1.43
11	2	o	Mathias Vosté	Belgium	1:09.37	+1.50
12	7	i	Cornelius Kersten	Great Britain	1:09.73	+1.86
13	10	o	Håvard Holmefjord Lorentzen	Norway	1:09.78	+1.91
14	3	i	Allan Dahl Johansson	Norway	1:09.84	+1.97
15	7	o	Alessio Trentini	Italy	1:09.88	+2.01
16	3	o	Nil Llop	Spain	1:09.89	+2.02
17	4	i	Stefan Emele	Germany	1:09.93	+2.06
18	2	i	Kristian Gamme Ulekleiv	Norway	1:10.71	+2.84
19	1	i	Valentin Thiebault	France	1:10.92	+3.05
20	1	o	Juuso Lehtonen	Finland	1:12.00	+4.13
