= 2024 European Speed Skating Championships – Men's 500 metres =

Men's 500 metres at the 2024 European Speed Skating Championships
- Venue: Thialf
- Location: Heerenveen, Netherlands
- Dates: 7 January
- Competitors: 20 from 12 nations
- Winning time: 34.48

Medalists
| gold medal | Jenning de Boo | Netherlands |
| silver medal | Marten Liiv | Estonia |
| bronze medal | Marek Kania | Poland |

The men's 500 metres competition at the 2024 European Speed Skating Championships was held on 7 January 2024.

== Results ==
The race was started at 16:19.

| Rank | Pair | Lane | Name | Country | Time | Diff |
|---|---|---|---|---|---|---|
| 1st place, gold medalist(s) | 7 | i | Jenning de Boo | Netherlands | 34.48 | |
| 2nd place, silver medalist(s) | 7 | o | Marten Liiv | Estonia | 34.78 | +0.30 |
| 3rd place, bronze medalist(s) | 10 | i | Marek Kania | Poland | 34.86 | +0.38 |
| 4 | 1 | o | Stefan Westenbroek | Netherlands | 34.93 | +0.45 |
| 5 | 5 | i | Piotr Michalski | Poland | 34.94 | +0.46 |
| 6 | 6 | o | David Bosa | Italy | 34.96 | +0.48 |
| 7 | 8 | o | Damian Żurek | Poland | 35.06 | +0.58 |
| 8 | 10 | o | Nil Llop | Spain | 35.16 | +0.68 |
| 9 | 8 | i | Janno Botman | Netherlands | 35.21 | +0.73 |
| 10 | 9 | o | Håvard Holmefjord Lorentzen | Norway | 35.29 | +0.81 |
| 11 | 6 | i | Pål Myhren Kristensen | Norway | 35.31 | +0.83 |
| 12 | 9 | i | Bjørn Magnussen | Norway | 35.38 | +0.90 |
| 13 | 4 | o | Mathias Vosté | Belgium | 35.47 | +0.99 |
| 14 | 5 | o | Hendrik Dombek | Germany | 35.66 | +1.18 |
| 15 | 3 | o | Moritz Klein | Germany | 35.70 | +1.22 |
| 16 | 4 | i | Maximilian Strübe | Germany | 35.83 | +1.35 |
| 17 | 2 | o | Cornelius Kersten | Great Britain | 35.98 | +1.50 |
| 18 | 3 | i | Ignaz Gschwentner | Austria | 36.08 | +1.60 |
| 19 | 2 | i | Juuso Lehtonen | Finland | 36.82 | +2.34 |
| 20 | 1 | i | Botond Bejczi | Hungary | 37.04 | +2.56 |
