= Asier Peña Iturria =

Spanish long track speed skater (born 1977)

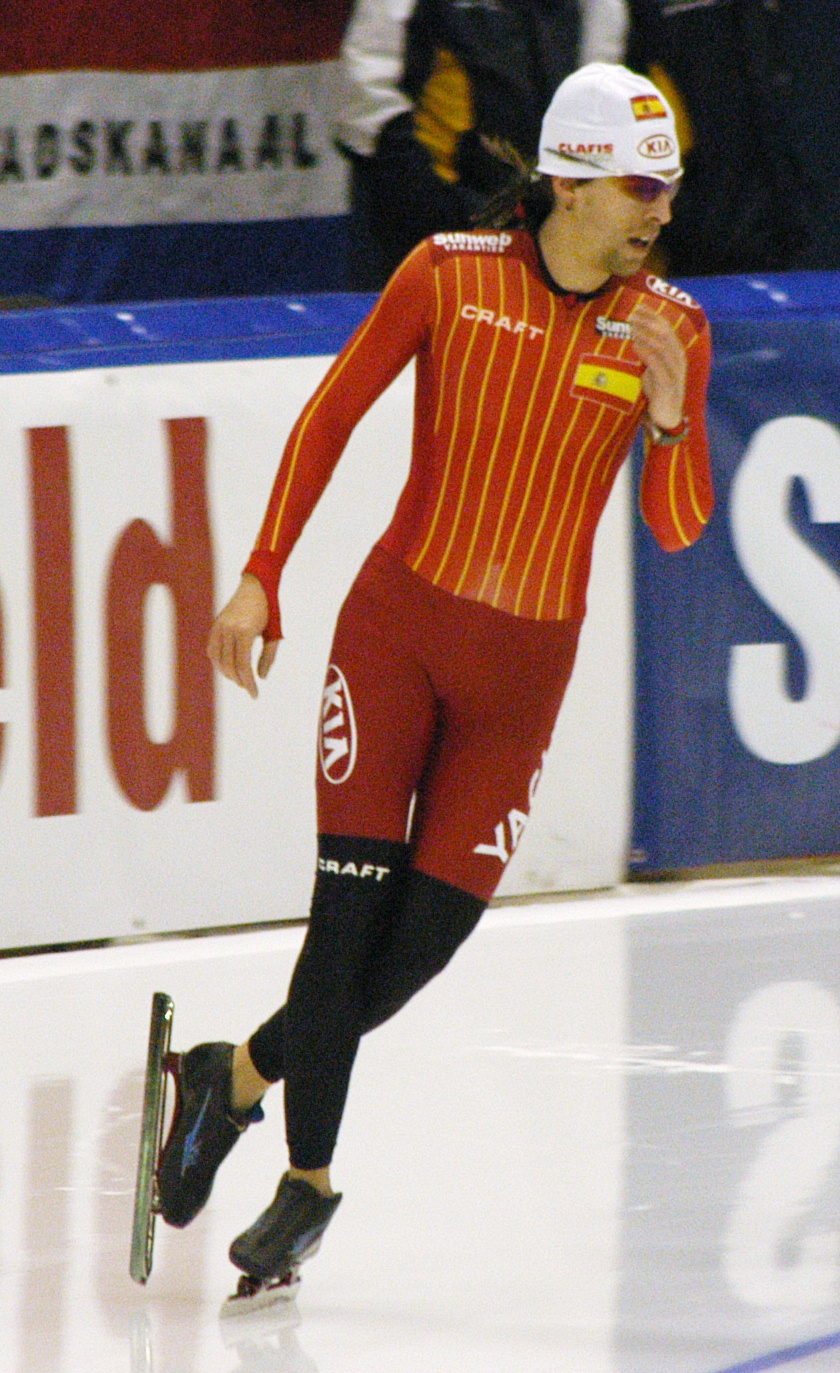
Asier Peña Iturria (ESP) at the European Allround Speed Skating Championships 2009 in Heerenveen, the Netherlands.

Asier Peña Iturria (born 15 April 1977) is a Spanish long track speed skater who participates in international competitions.

== Personal records ==
Personal records
Men's Speed skating
Event	Result	Date	Location	Notes
500 m	40.33	24 October 2009	Calgary	Spanish national record
1,000 m	1:18.52	19 September 2009	Calgary	Spanish national record
1,500 m	1:58.24	13 January 2008	Kolomna	Spanish national record
3,000 m	4:09.10	16 February 2008	Hamar	Spanish national record
5,000 m	6:51.72	12 December 2009	Salt Lake City	Spanish national record
10,000 m	14:35.06	27 January 2008	Hamar	Spanish national record

These personal records are fast enough to be in the top-500 of the Adelskalender. Iturria has a Samalog score of 164,668 pts. This means that he is the number 829 of the world (at 12 December 2009).

=== Career highlights ===
European Allround Championships
2010 - Hamar, 29th
2009 - Heerenveen, 26th
2008 - Kolomna, 32nd
