= 2026 World Sprint Speed Skating Championships =

International speed skating competition

- Location: Heerenveen, Netherlands
- Venue: Thialf
- Dates: 5–6 March

Medalist men
1st place, gold medalist(s)		Jenning de Boo	Netherlands
2nd place, silver medalist(s)		Jordan Stolz	United States
3rd place, bronze medalist(s)		Ning Zhongyan	China

Medalist women
1st place, gold medalist(s)		Femke Kok	Netherlands
2nd place, silver medalist(s)		Suzanne Schulting	Netherlands
3rd place, bronze medalist(s)		Marrit Fledderus	Netherlands

The 2026 World Sprint Speed Skating Championships were held at the Thialf stadium in Heerenveen, Netherlands, on 5 and 6 March 2026. Jenning de Boo and Femke Kok became world champions. The former also established a new world record for the sprint combination.

== Background ==
Jordan Stolz, 2026 Olympic gold medalist at the men's 500 and 1000 meter events, participated both in the World Sprint Championship and in the 2026 World Allround Speed Skating Championships that were held on 7 and 8 March. Defending champion Ning Zhongyan also participated.

Jutta Leerdam, 2026 Olympic gold medalist at the women's 1000 meter event, cancelled her participation in the World Sprint Championship. Outgoing champion Miho Takagi is not defending her title and will end her career after the 2026 World Allround Championship. Femke Kok, 2024 runner-up and 2026 Olympic gold medalist at the women's 500 meter event, is participating.

== Schedule ==
All times are local (UTC+1).

Date	Time	Event
5 March	19:00	Women's 500 m
5 March	19:36	Men's 500 m
5 March	20:23	Women's 1000 m
5 March	21:21	Men's 1000 m
6 March	19:00	Women's 500 m
6 March	19:36	Men's 500 m
6 March	20:23	Women's 1000 m
6 March	21:21	Men's 1000 m

== Medal summary ==
=== Medal table ===
* Host nation (Netherlands)

Rank	Nation	Gold	Silver	Bronze	Total
1	Netherlands*	2	1	1	4
2	United States	0	1	0	1
3	China	0	0	1	1
Totals (3 entries)		2	2	2	6

=== Medallists ===
Event	Gold		Silver		Bronze	
Men	Jenning de Boo; Netherlands	134.670	Jordan Stolz; United States	135.500	Ning Zhongyan; China	136.755
Women	Femke Kok; Netherlands	146.670	Suzanne Schulting; Netherlands	148.935	Marrit Fledderus; Netherlands	150.305
