= 2024 World Sprint Speed Skating Championships =

- Location: Inzell, Germany
- Venue: Max Aicher Arena
- Dates: 7–8 March

The 2024 World Sprint Speed Skating Championships were held at the Max Aicher Arena in Inzell, Germany, on 7 and 8 March 2024.

== Schedule ==
All times are local (UTC+1).

Date	Time	Event
7 March	19:00	Women's 500 m
7 March	19:00	Men's 500 m
7 March	20:20	Women's 1000 m
7 March	20:20	Men's 1000 m
8 March	18:30	Women's 500 m
8 March	18:30	Men's 500 m
8 March	19:50	Women's 1000 m
8 March	19:50	Men's 1000 m

== Medal summary ==
=== Medal table ===
* Host nation (Germany)

Rank	Nation	Gold	Silver	Bronze	Total
1	China	1	0	0	1
1	Japan	1	0	0	1
3	Netherlands	0	2	1	3
4	Canada	0	0	1	1
Totals (4 entries)		2	2	2	6

=== Medallists ===
Event	Gold		Silver		Bronze	
Men	Ning Zhongyan; China	136.680	Jenning de Boo; Netherlands	137.050	Laurent Dubreuil; Canada	137.515
Women	Miho Takagi; Japan	147.545	Femke Kok; Netherlands	148.100	Jutta Leerdam; Netherlands	148.265
