= Cédrick Brunet =

Canadian speed skater (born 2000)

Personal information
- Born: November 26, 2000 (age 25) Gatineau, Quebec, Canada

Sport
- Country: Canada
- Sport: Speed skating
- Events: 500 m, 1000 m

Cédrick Brunet (born November 26, 2000) is a Canadian speed skater. He competes primarily in the short distances of 500 m and 1000 m.

== Career ==
Brunet's first major competition was the 2019 Canada Winter Games in Red Deer, Alberta, where Brunet won three medals in the six events he contested. During the 2024–25 ISU Speed Skating World Cup, Brunet struggled with injury and did not earn his spot on the World Championships team. Due to the struggles, Brunet considered retiring from the sport.

At the 2025 Canadian trials, Brunet won his first national title, getting a personal best in the 500 metres event with a time of 34.42. In January 2026, at the Canadian Olympic Trials, Brunet qualified for the Canadian 2026 Olympic team.

== Personal life ==
Brunet comes from a family of Olympians. His aunt, Jennifer Heil is a multiple time Olympic medalist in the women's moguls. Meanwhile, his uncle is Dominick Gauthier, who competed in freestyle skiing at the 1998 Winter Olympics. Finally his dad, Michel Brunet, competed in figure skating at the Olympics. Brunet's brother is Frederic Brunet, a hockey player the National Hockey League's Boston Bruins.
