= Xue Zhiwen =

Chinese speed skater (born 2003)

Personal information
- Born: 1 August 2003 (age 22) Heilongjiang, China

Sport
- Country: China
- Sport: Speed skating
Medal record
Men's speed skating
Representing China
World Single Distances Championships
Gold medal – first place	2025 Hamar	Team sprint
Winter Youth Olympics
Bronze medal – third place	2020 Gangwon	500 m

Xue Zhiwen (Chinese: 薛智文; pinyin: Xuē Zhìwén; born 1 August 2003) is a Chinese speed skater.

== Career ==
Xue represented China at the 2020 Winter Youth Olympics and won a bronze medal in the 500 metres.

In March 2025, Xue represented China at the 2025 World Single Distances Speed Skating Championships and won a gold medal in the team sprint, along with Lian Ziwen and Ning Zhongyan.
