= Yevgeniy Koshkin =

Kazakhstani speed skater (born 2002)

Personal information
- Native name: Евгений Сергеевич Кошкин
- Born: 24 November 2002 (age 23) Almaty, Kazakhstan

Sport
- Country: Kazakhstan
- Sport: Speed skating
- Event(s): 100m, 500m
Medal record
Men's speed skating
Representing Kazakhstan
Event	1st	2nd	3rd
Asian Winter Games	0	1	0
Total	0	1	0
Asian Winter Games
Silver medal – second place	2025 Harbin	100 m

Yevgeniy Sergeyevich Koshkin (Russian: Евгений Сергеевич Кошкин; born 24 November 2002) is a Kazakh speed skater. He obtained a silver medal at the 100 meter race of the 2025 Asian Winter Games and won two 500 meter races in the 2025 World Cup, one in Tomaszow and one in Heerenveen.

== Career ==
As a child, Koshkin practiced ice hockey in his home town Almaty, which would explain his exceptional speed at the first 100 meters. At the age of 14, Koshkin took up speed skating. Two years later he was national junior champion.

His international debut was at the 2019 Junior World Cup in Enschede. 2025 was his breakthrough year with a silver medal at the Asian Winter Games and a win at the 5th stage of the World Cup in Poland. At the 6th stage of the 2024-25 World Cup in Heerenveen he won a gold and a bronze medal at the 500 meters.
