= 2024–25 ISU Speed Skating World Cup =

World speed skating tournament in Asia, Europe and North-America

- Dates: 22 November 2024 – 2 March 2025

The 2024–25 ISU Speed Skating World Cup was an international level speed skating tournament. The season consisted of 6 events, and began on 22 November 2024 in Nagano, Japan and ended on 2 March 2025 in Heerenveen, Netherlands. The World Cup was organised by the ISU who also ran world cups and championships in short track speed skating and figure skating.

== Calendar ==
The calendar for the 2024–25 season.

WC #	Location	Venue	Date	500 m	1000 m	1500 m	3000 m	5000 m	10000 m	Mass start	Team pursuit	Team sprint	Mixed relay
1	Nagano	M-Wave	22–24 Nov	2m, 2w	m, w	m, w	w	m		m, w	m, w		x
2	Beijing	National Speed Skating Oval	29 Nov – 1 Dec	2m, 2w	m, w	m, w	w	m		m, w		m, w	
3	Calgary	Olympic Oval	24–26 Jan	m, w	m, w	m, w		w	m	m, w		m, w	
4	Milwaukee	Pettit National Ice Center	31 Jan – 2 Feb	2m, 2w	m, w	m, w	w	m		m, w	m, w		x
5	Tomaszów Mazowiecki	Ice Arena	21–23 Feb	2m, 2w	m, w	m, w	w	m		m, w		m, w	
6	Heerenveen	Thialf	28 Feb – 2 Mar	2m, 2w	m, w	m, w	w	m		m, w	m, w		x
Total				11m, 11w	6m, 6w	6m, 6w	5w	5m, 1w	1m	6m, 6w	3m, 3w	3m, 3w	3x

== World Cup standings ==
=== Men's 500 metres ===
Pos	Athlete	Points
1	(United States) Jordan Stolz	568
2	(Canada) Laurent Dubreuil	476
3	(Japan) Tatsuya Shinhama	431
4	(Netherlands) Jenning de Boo	429
5	(Poland) Marek Kania	398

=== Women's 500 metres ===
Pos	Athlete	Points
1	(United States) Erin Jackson	524
2	(Poland) Andżelika Wójcik	480
3	(Japan) Yukino Yoshida	461
4	(Netherlands) Suzanne Schulting	442
5	(Poland) Kaja Ziomek-Nogal	395

=== Men's 1000 metres ===
Pos	Athlete	Points
1	(United States) Jordan Stolz	300
2	(Netherlands) Jenning de Boo	276
3	(United States) Cooper McLeod	257
4	(Netherlands) Kjeld Nuis	231
5	(China) Ning Zhongyan	215

=== Women's 1000 metres ===
Pos	Athlete	Points
1	(Japan) Miho Takagi	354
2	(United States) Brittany Bowe	256
3	(China) Mei Han	231
4	(Netherlands) Jutta Leerdam	227
5	(Netherlands) Angel Daleman	212

=== Men's 1500 metres ===
Pos	Athlete	Points
1	(United States) Jordan Stolz	340
2	(Norway) Peder Kongshaug	291
3	(Norway) Sander Eitrem	265
4	(China) Ning Zhongyan	252
5	(Netherlands) Kjeld Nuis	223

=== Women's 1500 metres ===
Pos	Athlete	Points
1	(Japan) Miho Takagi	336
2	(Netherlands) Joy Beune	282
3	(China) Mei Han	224
4	(Netherlands) Marijke Groenewoud	223
5	(Italy) Francesca Lollobrigida	214

=== Men's long distances ===
Pos	Athlete	Points
1	(Norway) Sander Eitrem	330
2	(Italy) Davide Ghiotto	311
3	(Netherlands) Beau Snellink	241
4	(United States) Casey Dawson	225
5	(Canada) Ted-Jan Bloemen	209

=== Women's long distances ===
Pos	Athlete	Points
1	(Norway) Ragne Wiklund	326
2	(Italy) Francesca Lollobrigida	269
3	(Netherlands) Joy Beune	264
4	(Netherlands) Merel Conijn	255
5	(Czech Republic) Martina Sáblíková	242

=== Men's mass start ===
Pos	Athlete	Points
1	(Italy) Andrea Giovannini	270
2	(Netherlands) Bart Hoolwerf	252
3	(France) Timothy Loubineaud	247
4	(Belgium) Bart Swings	246
5	(Belgium) Indra Medard	236

=== Women's mass start ===
Pos	Athlete	Points
1	(Netherlands) Marijke Groenewoud	340
2	(United States) Mia Manganello	247
3	(China) Yang Binyu	231
4	(Canada) Ivanie Blondin	223
5	(Italy) Francesca Lollobrigida	222

=== Men's team pursuit ===
Pos	Athlete	Points
1	United States	174
2	Italy	168
3	Norway	139
4	Netherlands	131
5	Japan	124

=== Women's team pursuit ===
Pos	Athlete	Points
1	Netherlands	180
2	Japan	162
3	United States	144
4	Germany	127
5	China	124

=== Men's team sprint ===
Pos	Athlete	Points
1	United States	174
2	Netherlands	148
3	South Korea	132
4	China	132
5	Canada	129

=== Women's team sprint ===
Pos	Athlete	Points
1	Poland	168
2	Canada	157
3	Kazakhstan	126
4	Germany	122
5	Netherlands	108

=== Mixed Relay ===
Pos	Athlete	Points
1	Canada	136
2	Germany	122
3	Poland	118
4	South Korea	103
5	Spain	92

== Medal count ==
Rank	Nation	Gold	Silver	Bronze	Total
1	Netherlands	27	26	22	75
2	United States	25	9	10	44
3	Japan	10	9	5	24
4	Norway	7	7	6	20
5	Italy	5	8	5	18
6	Canada	2	8	6	16
7	Poland	2	4	9	15
8	South Korea	2	3	3	8
9	Kazakhstan	2	0	2	4
10	France	2	0	1	3
11	Switzerland	1	0	0	1
12	China	0	5	12	17
13	Belgium	0	3	1	4
14	Czech Republic	0	1	2	3
15	Germany	0	1	1	2
16	Spain	0	1	0	1
Totals (16 entries)		85	85	85	255
