= Jenning de Boo =

Dutch speed skater (born 2004)

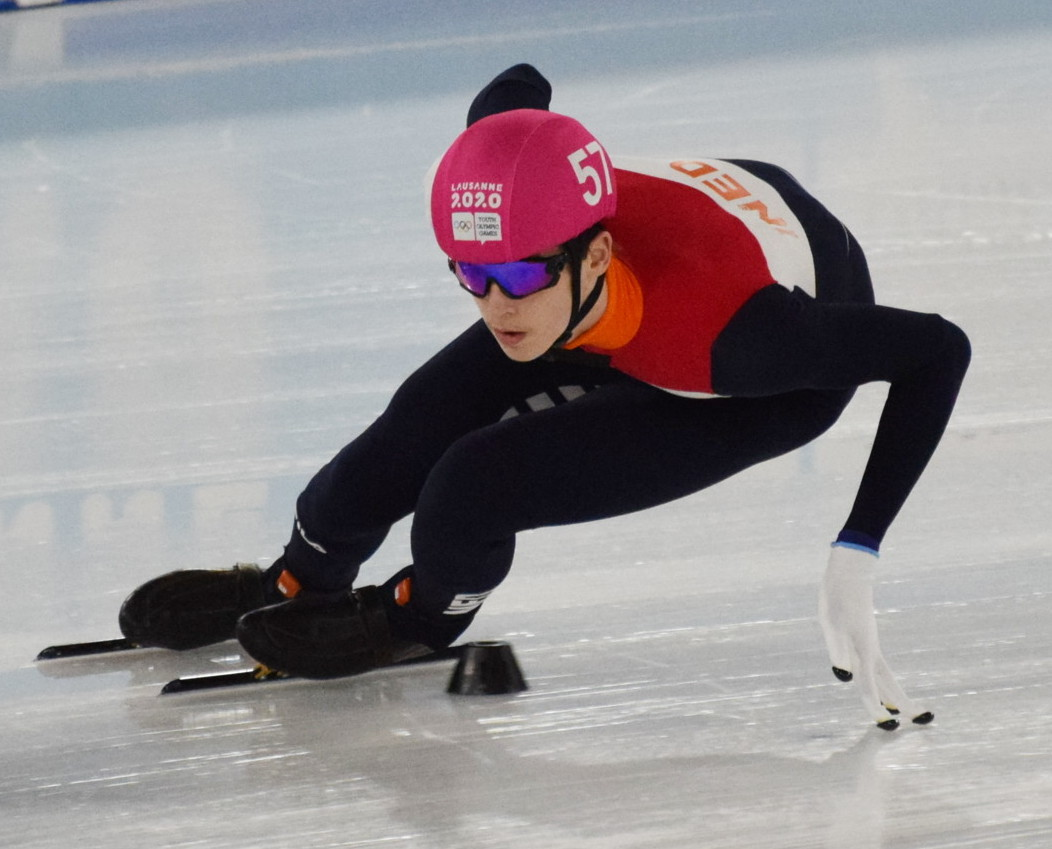
- De Boo in 2020

Personal information
- Born: 22 January 2004 (age 22) Groningen, Netherlands
- Height: 1.95 m (6 ft 5 in)

Sport
- Country: Netherlands
- Sport: Speed skating
- Events: 500 m, 1000 m, 1500 m
- Club: Team Reggeborgh
Medal record
Men's speed skating
Representing the Netherlands
Olympic Games
Silver medal – second place	2026 Milano Cortina	500 m
Silver medal – second place	2026 Milano Cortina	1000 m
World Single Distances Championships
Gold medal – first place	2025 Hamar	500 m
Silver medal – second place	2024 Calgary	Team sprint
Silver medal – second place	2025 Hamar	Team sprint
Silver medal – second place	2025 Hamar	1000 m
World Sprint Championships
Gold medal – first place	2026 Heerenveen	Sprint
Silver medal – second place	2024 Inzell	Sprint
European Championships
Gold medal – first place	2024 Heerenveen	500 m
Gold medal – first place	2025 Heerenveen	Sprint
Silver medal – second place	2024 Heerenveen	1000 m
Bronze medal – third place	2024 Heerenveen	Team sprint

Jenning de Boo (born 22 January 2004) is a Dutch speed skater who specializes in the sprint distances. A member of Team Reggeborgh, De Boo won a gold medal in the 500 m at the 2025 World Single Distances Speed Skating Championships, and is a two-time Olympic silver medalist.

== Career ==
=== 2019–2023: Early short track days and first steps into long track ===
De Boo started his career as a short track speed skater. He competed in the 500 m and 1000 m short track events at the 2020 Winter Youth Olympics in Lausanne, Switzerland. He won gold medal in the 500 m at the 2022 World Junior Short Track Speed Skating Championships. On the long track, he won a silver medal in the team sprint at the 2023 World Junior Speed Skating Championships in February 2023.

=== 2023–24 season: Long track World Cup debut and continental success ===
De Boo confirmed his switch to long track speed skating following the 2022–23 season. The following season, in November 2023, De Boo made his ISU Speed Skating World Cup debut at the Meiji Hokkaido-Tokachi Oval in Obihiro, Japan where he finished tenth in the 1000 m race. At the second World Cup race, held at the National Speed Skating Oval in Beijing, he finished in seventh place in the 1000 m race.

At the 2024 European Speed Skating Championships, held at Thialf in Heerenveen, Netherlands, De Boo won a bronze medal in the team sprint, a silver medal in the 1000 m and a gold medal in the 500 m.

=== 2024–25 season: World Single Distances champion ===
In March 2025, De Boo won a gold medal in the 500 m at the 2025 World Single Distances Speed Skating Championships in Hamar, Norway, clocking a track record time of 34.24 to beat rival Jordan Stolz and become world champion for the first time. A month later, he extended his contract with Team Reggeborgh until the 2027–28 season.

=== 2025–26 season: Two silvers on Olympic debut ===
At the 2026 Winter Olympics, de Boo won silver medals in both the 500 m and 1000 m races. In both races, he competed in the same heat as eventual gold medal winner Jordan Stolz. He concluded his season by taking the gold at the 2026 World Sprint Speed Skating Championships, setting a new sprint combination world record (134.670 points) in the process.

=== 2026–27 season ===
In early November 2026, De Boo fractured his collarbone in a fall from his bicycle following a collision during a team training session, forcing him to miss the first four ISU World Cup events of the 2026–27 season.

== Personal records ==
Personal records
Speed skating
Event	Result	Date	Location	Notes
500 m	33.63	16 November 2025	Utah Olympic Oval, Salt Lake City	NR
1000 m	1:06.05	25 January 2025	Olympic Oval, Calgary	NR
1500 m	1:50.67	30 September 2023	Thialf, Heerenveen	
