= Ning Zhongyan =

Chinese speed skater (born 1999)

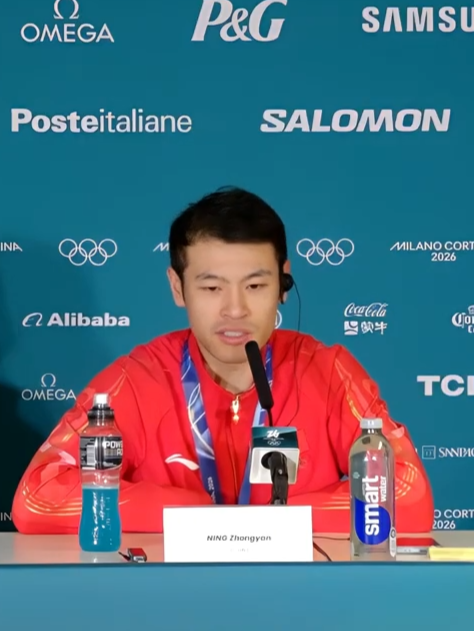
- Ning in 2026

Personal information
- Nationality: Chinese
- Born: 3 November 1999 (age 26) Mudanjiang, China
- Height: 1.78 m (5 ft 10 in)

Sport
- Country: China
- Sport: Speed skating
- Event: Sprint
Medal record
Men's speed skating
Representing China
Olympic Games
| Gold medal – first place | 2026 Milano Cortina | 1500 m |
| Bronze medal – third place | 2026 Milano Cortina | 1000 m |
| Bronze medal – third place | 2026 Milano Cortina | Team pursuit |
World Single Distances Championships
| Gold medal – first place | 2025 Hamar | Team sprint |
| Silver medal – second place | 2020 Salt Lake City | Team sprint |
| Silver medal – second place | 2024 Calgary | 1000 m |
World Sprint Championships
| Gold medal – first place | 2024 Inzell | Sprint |
| Bronze medal – third place | 2026 Heerenveen | Sprint |
Four Continents Championships
| Silver medal – second place | 2025 Hachinohe | 1500 m |
Asian Winter Games
| Gold medal – first place | 2025 Harbin | 1000 m |
| Gold medal – first place | 2025 Harbin | 1500 m |
| Gold medal – first place | 2025 Harbin | Team sprint |

Ning Zhongyan (Chinese: 宁忠岩; pinyin: Níng Zhōngyán; born 3 November 1999) is a Chinese speed skater. He served as one of the flag bearers for China at the 2026 Winter Olympics opening ceremony.

== Biography ==
He won a medal at the 2020 World Single Distances Speed Skating Championships.

In February 2022, Ning Zhongyan competed in the Beijing Winter Olympics, achieving a fifth-place finish in the men's 1,000-meter speed skating event, marking China's best performance in this event since the 1994 Winter Olympics. Ning Zhongyan secured victory in the men's 1500m final in speed skating at the 9th Asian Winter Games in Harbin on February 8, 2025.

On 19 February at the 2026 Milan-Cortina Winter Olympics, he won gold medal in the 1500 metres with an Olympic record time of 1:41.98.

== Olympic Results ==
| Year | Age | Men's Mass Start | Men's 1000m | Men's 1500m | Team Pursuit |
|---|---|---|---|---|---|
| (China) 2022 Beijing | 22 | 12 | 5 | 7 | - |
| (Italy) 2026 Milano Cortina | 26 | - | 3 | 1 | 3 |

As of March 8, 2026

Olympic Games
| Preceded by Gao Tingyu & Zhao Dan | Flagbearer for China (with Zhang Chutong); Milano Cortina 2026 | Succeeded by Incumbent |
