= Cooper McLeod =

American speed skater (born 2001)

Personal information
- Born: November 7, 2001 (age 25) Kirkland, Washington, U.S.

Sport
- Country: United States
- Sport: Speed skating
Medal record
Men's speed skating
Representing the United States
World Single Distances Championships
Bronze medal – third place	2025 Hamar	500 m
Bronze medal – third place	2025 Hamar	Team sprint
Four Continents Championships
Gold medal – first place	2025 Hachinohe	Team sprint

Cooper McLeod (born November 7, 2001) is an American speed skater.

== Career ==
In November 2024, McLeod competed at the 2025 Four Continents Speed Skating Championships and won gold medal in team sprint, along with Austin Kleba and Zach Stoppelmoor.

During World Cup #3 on January 26, 2025, he set a world record in the team sprint with a time of 1:16.98, becoming the first men's sprint team to break 1:17. In March 2025, he competed at the 2025 World Single Distances Speed Skating Championships and won bronze medals in the 500 metres and team sprint.

== World Cup overview ==
Overall trophy

Season	1000 meter	Points
2024–2025		257

Season	Location	500 meter	
2022–2023	(Canada) Calgary	20th	
2023–2024	(Japan) Obihiro	12th	
2023–2024	(China) Beijing	14th	19th
2023–2024	(Norway) Stavanger	18th	
2023–2024	(United States) Salt Lake City	6th	
2023–2024	(Canada) Quebec	10th	7th
2024–2025	(Japan) Nagano	5th	
2024–2025	(China) Beijing	4th	5th
2024–2025	(Canada) Calgary	6th	
2024–2025	(United States) Milwaukee	9th	11th
2024–2025	(Poland) Tomaszów Mazowiecki	8th	7th
2024–2025	(Netherlands) Heerenveen	13th	
2025–2026	(United States) Salt Lake City	7th	10th
2025–2026	(Canada) Calgary	9th	12th
2025–2026	(Netherlands) Heerenveen	16th	
2025–2026	(Norway) Hamar	9th	11th
2025–2026	(Germany) Inzell	9th	12th
2026–2027	(China) Beijing	17th	12th

Season	Location	1000 meter	
2021–2022	(Poland) Tomaszów Mazowiecki	18th	
2022–2023	(Canada) Calgary	16th	
2022–2023	(Canada) Calgary	15th	
2022–2023	(Poland) Tomaszów Mazowiecki	15th	
2022–2023	(Poland) Tomaszów Mazowiecki	17th	
2023–2024	(Japan) Obihiro	13th	
2023–2024	(China) Beijing	19th	
2023–2024	(Norway) Stavanger	19th	
2023–2024	(Poland) Tomaszów Mazowiecki	9th	
2023–2024	(United States) Salt Lake City	14th	18th
2023–2024	(Canada) Quebec	16th	
2024–2025	(Japan) Nagano	3rd place, bronze medalist(s)	
2024–2025	(China) Beijing	5th	
2024–2025	(Canada) Calgary	12th	
2024–2025	(United States) Milwaukee	4th	
2024–2025	(Poland) Tomaszów Mazowiecki	4th	
2024–2025	(Netherlands) Heerenveen	2nd place, silver medalist(s)	
2025–2026	(United States) Salt Lake City	9th	
2025–2026	(Canada) Calgary	4th	
2025–2026	(Netherlands) Heerenveen	12th	
2025–2026	(Norway) Hamar	10th	
2025–2026	(Germany) Inzell	5th	
2026–2027	(China) Beijing	9th	
2026–2027	(Japan) Obihiro	7th	

Season	Location	Team sprint
2022–2023	(Netherlands) Heerenveen	3rd place, bronze medalist(s)
2022–2023	(Canada) Calgary	6th
2022–2023	(Poland) Tomaszów Mazowiecki	5th
2023–2024	(China) Beijing	1st place, gold medalist(s)
2023–2024	(Norway) Stavanger	2nd place, silver medalist(s)
2023–2024	(Canada) Quebec	3rd place, bronze medalist(s)
2024–2025	(China) Beijing	2nd place, silver medalist(s)
2024–2025	(Canada) Calgary	1st place, gold medalist(s)
2024–2025	(Poland) Tomaszów Mazowiecki	1st place, gold medalist(s)
2025–2026	(Netherlands) Heerenveen	2nd place, silver medalist(s)
2025–2026	(Germany) Inzell	1st place, gold medalist(s)
