= Mathias Vosté =

Belgian speed skater (born 1994)

Personal information
- Nationality: Belgian
- Born: 20 May 1994 (age 32) Bruges, Belgium
- Height: 1.84 m (6 ft 0 in)
- Weight: 73 kg (161 lb)

Sport
- Sport: Speed skating
- Retired: 24 April 2026

Mathias Vosté (born 20 May 1994) is a now retired Belgian speed skater. He competed in the 2018, 2022 and 2026 Winter Olympics. In April 2026, he announced his retirement from the sport.

== Personal records ==
Personal records
Men's speed skating
Event	Result	Date	Location	Notes
500 m	35.18	11 January 2020	Thialf, Heerenveen	Current Belgian record.
1000 m	1:07.79	8 February 2020	Olympic Oval, Calgary	Current Belgian record.
1500 m	1:45.21	7 February 2020	Olympic Oval, Calgary	
3000 m	3:56.38	5 October 2019	Max Aicher Arena, Inzell	
5000 m	7:15.88	20 December 2015	Eindhoven	
