= Speed skating at the 2026 Winter Olympics – Qualification =

The qualification process for the 14 speed skating events at the 2026 Winter Olympics is based on performance of skaters at designated 2025-26 ISU Speed Skating World Cup events. Results at these events determine the Special Olympic Qualification Classifications that determine quota allocation to National Olympic Committees (NOC).

== Qualification rules ==
=== Quota places per event ===
There will be fourteen speed skating events at the 2026 Winter Olympics: six individual events and one team event for each gender. Quota places for the entry list and for a reserve list are established per event. For each event, a maximum number of participants per NOC is established.

Quota places per gender
	Entry list	Reserve list	Maximum per NOC
500 meter	28	8	3
1,000 meter	28	8	3
1,500 meter	28	8	3
3,000 meter	20	8	3
5,000 meter women	12	8	2
5,000 meter men	20	8	3
10,000 meter	12	8	2
Mass start	24	8	2
Team pursuit	8	4	1

The quota places will be assigned to National Olympic Committees and Authorized Neutral Athletes following the rankings of the Special Olympic Qualification Classifications. A limited number of neutral athletes will be allowed to participate in the qualification events.

The total number of participants in the 500, 1,000 and 1,500 meter events is in principle 28 but may increase to 30 in the course of the Winter Olympics. These additional spots can be assigned to athletes on the reserve list, that are on the entry list for another event, and that represent an NOC that has no other athletes in the race. Likewise, the total number of participants in the mass start races may increase from 24 to 30.

The host country, Italy, participates in the qualification process. If the host country does not obtain a quota place for an event, it will be assigned one quota place for the entry list. If Italy has a place on the reserve list, it obtains one additional quota place, in replacement of the last qualified quota place on the entry list.

=== Special Olympic Qualification Classifications ===
The Special Olympic Qualification Classifications are obtained by the performance of athletes in the first four stages of the 2025–26 ISU Speed Skating World Cup, namely:

- Stage 1: Salt Lake City, 14–16 November 2025
- Stage 2: Calgary, 21–23 November 2025
- Stage 3: Heerenveen, 5–7 December 2025
- Stage 4: Hamar, 12–14 December 2025

Two classification systems will be used: by points and by time. The number of quota places that will be assigned based on points and based on time is as follows:

Quota places assignation
	SOQCP (points-based)		SOQCT (time-based)	
	Entry list	Reserve list	Entry list	Reserve list
500, 1,000 and 1,500 meter	21		7	8
3,000 meter	15		5	8
5,000 meter women	9		3	8
5,000 meter men	15		5	8
10,000 meter	9		3	8
Mass start	24	8		
Team pursuit	6		2	4

The SOQCP (based on points) is obtained from the overall ranking of competitors after the four World Cup stages. For the long distances (3,000 and 5,000 for women; 5,000 and 10.000 for men), the point classification is combined.

The SOQCT (based on time) is obtained from the list of competitors ranked by their fastest time recorded in the four World Cup stages. The fastest athletes that have not already secured a quota place through the points classification, obtain a quota place for their NOC based on their best time. The reserve list is obtained from the time-based classification, except for the mass start races.

=== Maximum number of participants per NOC ===
The maximum number of participants per NOC is in principle seven.

NOC´s that qualify for the team event are entitled to register one additional participant.

NOC´s that have obtained the maximum number of quota places in each event per gender also are entitled to register one additional athlete.

Thus, nine athletes per gender is the maximum number of participants for NOC´s that participate in the team pursuit and have obtained the maximum number of athletes in all individual events per gender.

=== Minimum qualification times ===
An athlete is eligible to participate in a certain event by meeting the minimum qualification time for that event between 1 July 2025 and 18 January 2026. The minimum qualification times were published by ISU on 19 June 2025, as follows:

Event	Men	Women
500 metres	35.70	39.50
1000 metres	1:10.50	1:18.00
1500 metres	1:48.00	1:59.50
3000 metres	—N/a	4:12.00
5000 metres	6:30.00	7:20.00 or 4:08.00 (3000 m)
10,000 metres	13:30.00 or 6:25.00 (5000 m)	—N/a
Mass start	Any qualifying time above	Any qualifying time above

== Quota allocation ==
The International Skating Union confirmed the maximum, and event specific, quotas earned by each NOC on 19 December 2025. On 26 January 2026, the ISU confirmed the final NOC totals which required some adjustments to individual event entry quotas.

NOC	Men								Women								Athletes
NOC	500m	1,000m	1,500m	5,000m	10,000m	MS	TP	total	500m	1,000m	1,500m	3,000m	5,000m	MS	TP	total	Athletes
Austria		1	2	1		1		3	1	1	1	1		1		3	6
Belgium		1	1	1	1	2		3		1	1	1	1	2	X	3	6
Canada	3	1	2	1	1	2		7	3	3	3	3	2	2	X	8	15
China	3	2	2	1		2	X	7	3	3	3	1	1	2	X	8	15
Czech Republic			1	1	1	1		1		1	2	1	1			2	3
Denmark						1		1									1
Estonia	1	1						1									1
France			1	1	1	2	X	5				1				1	6
Germany		3	3	3		2	X	7	1	1	1	1	1	2	X	6	13
Great Britain										1	1					1	1
Hungary		1	1					1									1
Individual Neutral Athletes												2	1	1		3	3
Italy	1	1	1	3	2	1	X	7	1	1	1	1	1	1		3	10
Japan	3	3	3	1		1	X	7	3	3	3	1		2	X	7	14
Kazakhstan	1							1	2	2	2	2	1	1	X	4	5
Netherlands	3	3	3	3	2	2	X	9	3	3	3	3	2	2	X	9	18
Norway	2	1	3	3	2	1	X	7	1		1	1	1	1		3	10
Poland	3	3	1		1			4	3	2	1					5	9
South Korea	3	2				2		4	2	2	1			2		4	8
Spain	1	1						2									2
Switzerland						1		1		1	1	1		2		2	3
Chinese Taipei									1							1	1
United States	3	3	3	1	1	2	X	7	2	2	2			2	X	6	13
Total: 23 NOCs	27 (Note: unused quota will be filled "on-site" by qualified competitors already at the games, based on their SOQC ranking; priority will be given to NOCs that have not yet been allocated a quota place for the event.)	27	27	20	12	23	8	85	26	27	27	20	12	23	8	79	164

== Points Ranking ==
=== Men's 500m ===
The top 21 athletes, with a maximum of 3 per NOC, will earn a quota for their country.

Pos.	Racer	(United States) SLC 1	(United States) SLC 2	(Canada) CGY 1	(Canada) CGY 2	(Netherlands) HEE	(Norway) HAM 1	(Norway) HAM 2	Points	Note
1	Jordan Stolz (USA)	60	43	48	60	60	60	60	391	Q
2	Damian Żurek (POL)	54	38	43	54	30	48	54	321	Q
3	Jenning de Boo (NED)	31	60	54	40	54	54		293	Q
4	Wataru Morishige (JPN)	43	36	38	43	48	43	28	279	Q
5	Bjørn Magnussen (NOR)	40	32	22	26	34	38	34	226	Q
6	Sebas Diniz (NED)	23	24	40	27	32	36	43	225	Q
7	Yevgeniy Koshkin (KAZ)	25	54	24	21	31	31	38	224	Q
8	Yuta Hirose (JPN)	30	22	29	22	28	40	48	219	Q
9	Kim Joon-ho (KOR)	24	48	60	48	36			216	Q
10	Cooper Mcleod (USA)	36	31	32	29	25	32	30	215	Q
11	Gao Tingyu (CHN)	48	27	30	31	28	22	24	210	Q
12	Marten Liiv (EST)	32	24	28	36	24	34	32	210	Q
13	Laurent Dubreuil (CAN)	34	30	31	30	38	25	21	209	Q
14	Xue Zhiwen (CHN)	28	40	36	23	29	23	23	202	Q
15	Tatsuya Shinhama (JPN)	27	26	21	28	27	29	40	198	Q
16	Lian Ziwen (CHN)	21	28	28	34	26	28	26	191	Q
17	Katsuhiro Kuratsubo (JPN)	4	5	24	38	40	30	36	177	
18	Marek Kania (POL)	26	34	34	32	43			169	Q
19	Cédrick Brunet (CAN)	28	29	25	24	15	24	22	167	Q
20	Joep Wennemars (NED)	29	25	26	28	22	21		151	Q
21	Koo Kyung-min (KOR)	38	0	8	24	23	17	29	139	Q
22	Piotr Michalski (POL)	24	23	10	10	4	28	27	126	Q
23	Stefan Westenbroek (NED)	21	13	15	21	0	24	31	125	
24	Nil Llop Izquierdo (ESP)	12	10	21	25	16	12	24	120	
25	Christopher Fiola (CAN)	15	21	27	9	11	13	9	105	
26	Yuma Murakami (JPN)	16	28	23	14	3	6	14	104	
27	Chung Jae-woong (KOR)	17	15	14	5	6	21	25	103	
28	Liu Ze (CHN)	8	6	9	1	24	26	28	102	
29	Anders Johnson (CAN)	9	14	16	11	17	16	11	94	
30	Du Haonan (CHN)	14	16	17	17	12	9	8	93	
31	Merijn Scheperkamp (NED)	13	12	3	13	21	27		89	
32	Cho Sang-hyeok (KOR)	11	9	13	15	13	15	13	89	
33	Zach Stoppelmoor (USA)	22	17	7	6	9	7	7	75	
34	Jeffrey Rosanelli (ITA)	7	7	6	7	7	14	21	69	
35	Siver Brattgjerd (NOR)	6	11	2	4	2	10	12	47	
36	Henrik Fagerli Rukke (NOR)	0	2	0	12	5	11	15	45	
37	Altay Zhardembekuly (KAZ)	0	3	12	0	1	8	16	40	
38	Artur Galiyev (KAZ)	1	4	0	8	8	0	17	38	
39	Yankun Zhao (CAN)			11	16				27	
40	Conor McDermott-Mostowy (USA)	5	8	0	1	10	0	3	27	
41	Kacper Abratkiewicz (POL)	3	0	4	0	14	1	2	24	
42	Alec Sklutovsky (USA)	10	0						10	
43	Dai Dai Ntab (NED)							10	10	
44	David Bosa (ITA)	2	1	5	0				8	
45	Maximilian Strübe (GER)	0	0	0	2	0	5	0	7	
46	Cristian Landrø Magnussen (NOR)	0	0	0	0	0	3	4	7	
47	Tai Wei-lin (TPE)	0	0	1	3	0	2	1	7	
48	Szymon Wojtakowski (POL)							6	6	
49	Serge Yoro (NED)							5	5	
50	Erik Resell (NOR)						4	0	4	
51	Moritz Klein (GER)	0	0	0	0				0	
52	Daniel Milagros (ESP)	0	0	0		0	0	0	0	
53	Ignaz Gschwentner (AUT)	0	0	0	0	0	0	0	0	
54	Cornelius Kersten (GBR)		0		0		0	0	0	
54	Oliver Grob (SUI)	0	0	0	0	0	0	0	0	
56	Tuukka Suomalainen (FIN)	0	0	0		0	0	0	0	
57	Gabriel Eduard Nitu (ROU)	0	0	0	0	0	0	0	0	
58	Mathias Vosté (BEL)				0				0	
59	Min-seok Kim (HUN)		0						0	
60	Sebastian Forsmark (SWE)	0	0	0	0	0	0	0	0	
61	Joonas Valge (EST)	0	0	0	0	0	0	0	0	
62	Mateusz Śliwka (POL)						0		0	
63	Robbe Beelen (BEL)	0	0	0	0	0	0	0	0	
64	Kai In 't Veld (GRE)					0		0	0	
65	Max Kokko (FIN)				0				0	
66	Botond Bejczi (HUN)			0					0	
67	Bálint Bödei (HUN)	0							0	
68	Hendrik Dombek (GER)					0			0	
69	Prokop Stodola (CZE)			0	0		0	0	0	

=== Men's 1000m ===
The top 21 athletes, with a maximum of 3 per NOC, will earn a quota for their country.

Pos.	Racer	(United States) SLC	(Canada) CGY	(Netherlands) HEE	(Norway) HAM	Points	Note
1	Jordan Stolz (USA)	60	60	60	60	240	Q
2	Jenning de Boo (NED)	48	54	43	43	188	Q
3	Damian Żurek (POL)	54	38	34	54	180	Q
4	Tim Prins (NED)	38	36	48	36	158	Q
5	Finn Sonnekalb (GER)	40	27	54	28	149	Q
6	Marten Liiv (EST)	36	34	32	40	142	Q
7	Cooper Mcleod (USA)	32	43	29	31	135	Q
8	Ning Zhongyan (CHN)	43	26	40	22	131	Q
9	Conor McDermott-Mostowy (USA)	30	29	30	38	127	Q
10	Ryota Kojima (JPN)	34	32	31	30	127	Q
11	Lian Ziwen (CHN)	28	40	26	27	121	Q
12	Joep Wennemars (NED)	32	48	38		118	Q
13	Kjeld Nuis (NED)	0	28	36	48	112	
14	Taiyo Nonomura (JPN)	28	31	27	26	112	Q
15	Mathias Vosté (BEL)	25	24	24	29	102	Q
16	Hendrik Dombek (GER)	24	28	25	24	101	Q
17	Piotr Michalski (POL)	16	24	23	34	97	Q
18	Moritz Klein (GER)	26	25	21	21	93	Q
19	Marek Kania (POL)	29	30	28		87	Q
20	Gabriel Odor (AUT)	15	16	24	25	80	Q
21	Szymon Wojtakowski (POL)	13	4	28	23	68	
22	Zach Stoppelmoor (USA)	0	8	21	32	61	
23	Bjørn Magnussen (NOR)	12	17	11	16	56	Q
24	Daniele Di Stefano (ITA)	14	12	16	14	56	Q
25	Min-seok Kim (HUN)	24	23	7		54	
26	Anders Johnson (CAN)	10	14	15	12	51	
27	Laurent Dubreuil (CAN)	27	21			48	
28	Nil Llop Izquierdo (ESP)	4	15	14	13	46	
29	Oh Hyun-min (KOR)	21	22	2	0	45	
30	Kazuya Yamada (JPN)	0	21	22		43	
31	Koo Kyung-min (KOR)	17	9	17	0	43	
32	Yankun Zhao (CAN)	7	11	10	1	29	
33	Serge Yoro (NED)				28	28	
34	Artur Galiyev (KAZ)	8	3	0	15	26	
35	Merijn Scheperkamp (NED)				24	24	
36	Connor Howe (CAN)	23				23	
37	Deng Zhihan (CHN)	5	7	8	3	23	
38	David La Rue (CAN)				21	21	
39	Tatsuya Shinhama (JPN)				17	17	
40	Kai In 't Veld (GRE)	1	0	9	7	17	
41	Tyson Langelaar (CAN)		0	5	11	16	
42	Kai Verbij (NED)	6	5	4		15	
43	Henrik Fagerli Rukke (NOR)	0	0	6	8	14	
44	Katsuhiro Kuratsubo (JPN)		13			13	
45	Park Seong-hyeon (KOR)	0	0	13	0	13	
46	Cho Sang-hyeok (KOR)			12		12	
47	Francesco Betti (ITA)			3	9	12	
48	Wataru Morishige (JPN)	11		0		11	
49	Cornelius Kersten (GBR)	9	2	0	0	11	
50	David Bosa (ITA)	0	10			10	
51	Mateusz Śliwka (POL)				10	10	
52	Kim Tae-yun (KOR)	0	6			6	
53	Tai Wei-lin (TPE)	0	0	0	6	6	
54	Erik Resell (NOR)				5	5	
55	Masaya Yamada (JPN)	0	0	0	4	4	
56	Alessio Trentini (ITA)	3	0			3	
57	Valentin Thiebault (FRA)	2	0	0	0	2	
58	Finn Elias Haneberg (NOR)		0	0	2	2	
59	Stefan Emele (GER)	0	1			1	
60	Cédrick Brunet (CAN)			1		1	
61	Liu Ze (CHN)	0	0	0	0	0	
62	Allan Dahl Johansson (NOR)	0				0	
63	Konrád Nagy (HUN)	0	0		0	0	
64	Robbe Beelen (BEL)	0	0	0	0	0	
65	Sebastian Forsmark (SWE)	0	0	0	0	0	
66	Jonathan Tobon (USA)	0				0	
67	Flavio Gross (SUI)	0	0	0	0	0	
68	Ignaz Gschwentner (AUT)	0	0	0	0	0	
69	Botond Bejczi (HUN)			0		0	
70	Jeffrey Rosanelli (ITA)			0		0	
71	Tuukka Suomalainen (FIN)	0	0	0		0	
72	Cosmin Nedelea (ROU)	0	0			0	
73	Joonas Valge (EST)	0	0	0		0	
74	Cristian Landrø Magnussen (NOR)				0	0	
75	Gabriel Eduard Nitu (ROU)			0		0	
76	Daniel Milagros (ESP)	0	0		0	0	
77	Juuso Lehtonen (FIN)				0	0	
78	Bálint Bödei (HUN)				0	0	
79	Prokop Stodola (CZE)		0		0	0	

=== Men's 1500m ===
The top 21 athletes, with a maximum of 3 per NOC, will earn a quota for their country.

Pos.	Racer	(United States) SLC	(Canada) CGY	(Netherlands) HEE	(Norway) HAM	Points	Note
1	Jordan Stolz (USA)	60	60	60	60	240	Q
2	Kjeld Nuis (NED)	40	48	54	54	196	Q
3	Ning Zhongyan (CHN)	54	38	48	48	188	Q
4	Finn Sonnekalb (GER)	48	54	43	43	188	Q
5	Tim Prins (NED)	34	40	40	31	145	Q
6	Peder Kongshaug (NOR)	43	26	32	32	133	Q
7	Sander Eitrem (NOR)	25	28	36	40	129	Q
8	Gabriel Odor (AUT)	21	36	31	36	124	Q
9	Daniele Di Stefano (ITA)	31	30	29	34	124	Q
10	Joep Wennemars (NED)	36	43	38		117	Q
11	Kazuya Yamada (JPN)	38	26	26	27	117	Q
12	Tijmen Snel (NED)	26	34	34	22	116	
13	Wesly Dijs (NED)	27	32	27	24	110	
14	Taiyo Nonomura (JPN)	29	29	21	30	109	Q
15	Didrik Eng Strand (NOR)	30	24	28	26	108	Q
16	Min-seok Kim (HUN)	32	21	23	21	97	Q
17	Alexander Farthofer (AUT)	7	28	30	29	94	Q
18	Metoděj Jílek (CZE)	13	13	24	38	88	Q
19	Hendrik Dombek (GER)	17	24	24	23	88	Q
20	Liu Hanbin (CHN)	28	31	22		81	Q
21	Vladimir Semirunniy (POL)	9	16	28	28	81	Q
22	Valentin Thiebault (FRA)	10	21	25	21	77	Q
23	David La Rue (CAN)	29	23	7	14	73	Q
24	Motonaga Arito (JPN)	24	22	8	5	59	
25	Emery Lehman (USA)	16	17	10	16	59	
26	Antoine Gélinas-Beaulieu (CAN)	24	27		6	57	
27	Kotaro Kasahara (JPN)	22	0	17	17	56	
28	Moritz Klein (GER)	14	12	16	9	51	
29	Casey Dawson (USA)	15	15	12	8	50	
30	Li Wenhao (CHN)	5	14	5	24	48	
31	Ryota Kojima (JPN)			21	25	46	
32	Mathias Vosté (BEL)	23	5	15	0	43	
33	Jake Weidemann (CAN)			14	28	42	
34	Conor McDermott-Mostowy (USA)	9	10	11	12	42	
35	Park Seong-hyeon (KOR)	1	6	13	7	27	
36	Connor Howe (CAN)	21				21	
37	Szymon Wojtakowski (POL)	12	8	0	0	20	
38	Francesco Betti (ITA)	0	7	0	11	18	
39	Finn Elias Haneberg (NOR)		0	2	15	17	
40	Marten Liiv (EST)	6	11			17	
41	Serge Yoro (NED)				13	13	
42	Kai In 't Veld (GRE)	0	0	9	4	13	
43	Viktor Rudenko (AIN)	2	0		10	12	
44	Ethan Cepuran (USA)	11				11	
45	Yang Ho-jun (KOR)	0	9	1	0	10	
46	Mathieu Belloir (FRA)	0	0	6	3	9	
47	Gabriel Groß (GER)	4	4	0		8	
48	Livio Wenger (SUI)	3	1	3	0	7	
49	Indra Medard (BEL)	0	0	4	2	6	
50	Viktor Hald Thorup (DEN)	0	3			3	
51	Ryan Kulbacki (CAN)		2			2	
52	Sigurd Holbø Dyrset (NOR)	0		0	1	1	
53	Riccardo Lorello (ITA)	0	0			0	
54	Tai Wei-lin (TPE)	0	0			0	
55	Peter Michael (NZL)	0	0			0	
56	Roman Binazarov (KAZ)	0	0	0	0	0	
57	Masaya Yamada (JPN)	0	0			0	
58	Cornelius Kersten (GBR)	0	0	0		0	
59	Allan Dahl Johansson (NOR)	0	0			0	
60	Tyson Langelaar (CAN)		0	0		0	
61	Flavio Gross (SUI)	0	0	0	0	0	
62	Konrád Nagy (HUN)		0	0		0	
63	Manuel Robla (ESP)	0		0	0	0	
64	Bálint Bödei (HUN)	0				0	
65	Juuso Lehtonen (FIN)	0	0	0	0	0	
66	Afonso Henrique Pestana Silva (POR)	0	0	0	0	0	
67	Lukas Stekly (SVK)		0	0		0	
68	Danila Semerikov (UZB)	0	0			0	
69	Alessio Trentini (ITA)	0	0			0	
70	Prokop Stodola (CZE)	0				0	
71	Daan Van Der Elst (BEL)	0	0	0	0	0	
72	Adrian Octavian Fierar (ROU)		0		0	0	
73	Botond Bejczi (HUN)				0	0	
74	Tadeáš Procházka (CZE)		0		0	0	
75	Ayitinama Yeerhanati (CHN)				0	0	
76	Yahor Damaratski (AIN)			0		0	

=== Men's 5000m and 10000m ===
The qualification points ranking for the men's 5000m and 10000m are combined. The top 15 athletes, with a maximum of 3 per NOC, will earn a quota for their country in the 5000m. The top 9 athletes, with a maximum of 2 per NOC, will earn a quota for their country in the 10000m.

Pos.	Racer	(United States) SLC	(Canada) CGY	(Netherlands) HEE	(Norway) HAM	Points	Note
1	Metoděj Jílek (CZE)	54	36	60	60	210	Q
2	Timothy Loubineaud (FRA)	60	43	48	54	205	Q
3	Sander Eitrem (NOR)	48	54	43	48	193	Q
4	Casey Dawson (USA)	43	60	38	34	175	Q
5	Davide Ghiotto (ITA)	38	38	54	36	166	Q
6	Ted-Jan Bloemen (CAN)	36	48	36	40	160	Q
7	Chris Huizinga (NED)	40	40	34	31	145	Q
8	Jorrit Bergsma (NED)	34	29	40	38	141	Q
9	Michele Malfatti (ITA)	32	34	32	26	124	Q
10	Alexander Farthofer (AUT)	32	30	29	28	119	q
11	Felix Maly (GER)	30	32	30	25	117	q
12	Bart Swings (BEL)	28	27	32	29	116	q
13	Fridtjof Petzold (GER)	31	31	22	30	114	q
14	Beau Snellink (NED)	20	32	31	27	110	q
15	Sigurd Henriksen (NOR)	29	26	25	28	108	q
16	Riccardo Lorello (ITA)	17	28	29	32	106	
17	Vladimir Semirunniy (POL)	6	20	36	43	105	
18	Gabriel Groß (GER)	25	28	17	21	91	
19	Kars Jansman (NED)	8	25	24	25	82	
20	Viktor Hald Thorup (DEN)	9	16	23	32	80	
21	Marcel Bosker (NED)	27	17	11	20	75	
22	Giovanni Trebouta (FRA)	16	19	18	18	71	
23	Manuel Ghiotto (ITA)	15	4	20	19	58	
24	Andrea Giovannini (ITA)	26	0	21	10	57	
25	Peder Kongshaug (NOR)	28	25			53	
26	Patrick Beckert (GER)	13	12	16	12	53	
27	Ethan Cepuran (USA)	10	18	5	14	47	
28	Graeme Fish (CAN)	4	8	19	13	44	
29	Wu Yu (CHN)	0	13	15	16	44	
30	Li Wenhao (CHN)	14	15	3	11	43	
31	Thibault Métraux (SUI)	19	10	12	0	41	
32	Shomu Sasaki (JPN)	21	2	0	17	40	
33	Cong Zhenlong (CHN)	11	14	13	2	40	
34	Daniel Hall (CAN)	25	7	0	7	39	
35	Liu Hanbin (CHN)	18	21	0		39	
36	Chung Jae-won (KOR)	5	9	9	3	26	
37	Szymon Palka (POL)	0	1	6	15	22	
38	Taiyo Morino (JPN)	0	3	14	4	21	
39	Peter Michael (NZL)	12	0	8		20	
40	Livio Wenger (SUI)	7	5		8	20	
41	Riku Tsuchiya (JPN)	0	0	10	9	19	
42	Yahor Damaratski (AIN)	3	6		6	15	
43	Danila Semerikov (UZB)	0	11		1	12	
44	Daniil Naidenyshev (AIN)			7		7	
45	Sigurd Holbø Dyrset (NOR)	0	0	1	5	6	
46	Motonaga Arito (JPN)	0	0	4		4	
47	Cho Seungmin (KOR)	0	0	2		2	
47	Lukas Stekly (SVK)	2	0	0	0	2	
49	Didrik Eng Strand (NOR)	1	0			1	
50	Oddbjørn Mellemstrand (NOR)			0	0	0	
50	Jake Weidemann (CAN)		0			0	
50	William Silk (USA)	0				0	
50	Afonso Henrique Pestana Silva (POR)	0			0	0	
50	Mateusz Śliwka (POL)			0		0	
50	Vitaliy Chshigolev (KAZ)				0	0	
50	Kelin Dunfee (USA)	0	0	0	0	0	
50	Manuel Robla (ESP)	0	0		0	0	
50	Bálint Bödei (HUN)	0	0			0	
50	Andrey Zuyev (KAZ)		0	0		0	
50	Carl Platt (USA)	0				0	
50	Adrian Octavian Fierar (ROU)		0		0	0	
50	Philip Due Schmidt (DEN)	0	0	0	0	0	
50	Vadim Yakubovskiy (KAZ)	0				0	
50	Wojciech Gutowski (POL)	0	0		0	0	
50	Max Halyk (CAN)		0			0	
50	Tadeáš Procházka (CZE)	0	0		0	0	
50	Daan Van Der Elst (BEL)	0	0	0	0	0	
50	Filip Møller Nordal (NOR)				0	0	
50	Kotaro Kasahara (JPN)	0	0		0	0	
50	Miguel Bravo (POR)		0	0		0	
50	Severin Widmer (SUI)	0	0	0	0	0	

=== Men's Mass Start ===
The top 24 athletes, with a maximum of 2 per NOC, will earn a quota for their country in the mass start. The next 8 athletes will be on the reserve list. Up to six additional starting positions for the mass start will be made available during the games, given in reserve order, with priority given to countries that do not yet have an entry. However, only skaters that already took part in another event will be eligible. After allocations were finalized only 23 quotas were given making seven starting positions available during the games.

Pos.	Racer	(United States) SLC	(Canada) CGY	(Netherlands) HEE	(Norway) HAM	Points	Note
1	Jorrit Bergsma (NED)	60	34	60	43	197	Q
2	Andrea Giovannini (ITA)	27	60	40	48	175	Q
3	Bart Swings (BEL)	31	43	43	54	171	Q
4	Chung Jae-won (KOR)	30	54	54	20	158	Q
5	Jordan Stolz (USA)	26	48	18	60	152	Q
6	Livio Wenger (SUI)	40	31	36	40	147	Q
7	Metoděj Jílek (CZE)	25	38	38	38	139	Q
8	Bart Hoolwerf (NED)	28	36	48	26	138	Q
9	Felix Maly (GER)	54	24	29	28	135	Q
10	Antoine Gélinas-Beaulieu (CAN)	48	26	23	31	128	Q
11	Jake Weidemann (CAN)	43	23	20	36	122	Q
12	Gabriel Odor (AUT)	34	40	19	27	120	Q
13	Timothy Loubineaud (FRA)	23	29	32	34	118	Q
14	Fridtjof Petzold (GER)	38	20	26	32	116	Q
15	Viktor Hald Thorup (DEN)	36	22	30	22	110	Q
16	Ethan Cepuran (USA)	17	32	24	30	103	Q
17	Indra Medard (BEL)	21	30	27	23	101	Q
18	Li Yuhaochen (CHN)	8	27	31	25	91	Q
19	Shomu Sasaki (JPN)	24	28	21	12	85	Q
20	Mathieu Belloir (FRA)	20	0	34	24	78	Q
21	Cho Seungmin (KOR)	29	21	17	11	78	Q
22	Zhou Zihan (CHN)	22	25	13	15	75	Q
23	Didrik Eng Strand (NOR)	17	19	25	9	70	Q
24	Philip Due Schmidt (DEN) (Note: Denmark were only given one quota meaning they could not qualify two in the mass start, and cannot have another athlete present to be a reserve.)	18	11	8	29	66	
25	Sigurd Holbø Dyrset (NOR)	13	13	18	21	65	R5
26	Daniele Di Stefano (ITA)	32	0	28	3	63	R6
27	Alexander Farthofer (AUT)	15	18	10	17	60	R7
28	Vadim Yakubovskiy (KAZ)	7	15	14	20	56	R1
29	Yahor Damaratski (AIN)	1	8	22	19	50	R2
30	Min-seok Kim (HUN)	11	7	15	16	49	R3
31	Marcin Bachanek (POL)	5	17	9	10	41	R4
32	Taiyo Morino (JPN)	10	14	7	8	39	R8
33	Botond Bejczi (HUN)	12	0	11	13	36	
34	Peter Michael (NZL)	19	12	0	4	35	
35	Lukas Stekly (SVK)	0	3	4	14	21	
36	Miguel Bravo (POR)	2	10	3	6	21	
37	Mateusz Śliwka (POL)	14	0	5	0	19	
38	Danila Semerikov (UZB)	9	9		0	18	
39	Afonso Henrique Pestana Silva (POR)	3	6	2	7	18	
40	Manuel Robla (ESP)	4	4	0	5	13	
41	Vitaliy Chshigolev (KAZ)			12	0	12	
42	Kai In 't Veld (GRE)	0	1	6	2	9	
43	Flavio Gross (SUI)	6	0	1	0	7	
44	Tadeáš Procházka (CZE)	0	5		1	6	
45	Tai Wei-lin (TPE)	0	2			2	
46	Andrey Zuyev (KAZ)	0	0			0	
46	Adrian Octavian Fierar (ROU)		0			0	
46	Kierryn Hughes (NZL)	0	0			0	
46	Cosmin Nedelea (ROU)	0				0	

=== Men's Team pursuit ===
The top six nations will earn a quota for the Team pursuit.

Pos.	Racer	(United States) SLC	(Canada) CGY	(Norway) HAM	Points	Note
1	United States	60	60	60	180	Q
2	Netherlands	38	48	48	134	Q
3	France	43	54	36	133	Q
4	Italy	34	40	54	128	Q
5	Germany	40	43	43	126	Q
6	China	48	38	38	124	Q
7	Norway	54	34	34	122	
8	Japan	40	40	40	120	
9	Poland	36	36	33	105	
10	Canada	25	33	40	98	
11	Switzerland	29	29	36	94	
12	Kazakhstan	28	27	29	84	
13	Hungary	27	28	27	82	
14	South Korea	33	36		69	
15	Czech Republic	26		28	54	
16	Belgium	36			36	

=== Women's 500m ===
The top 21 athletes, with a maximum of 3 per NOC, will earn a quota for their country.

Pos.	Racer	(United States) SLC 1	(United States) SLC 2	(Canada) CGY 1	(Canada) CGY 2	(Netherlands) HEE	(Norway) HAM 1	(Norway) HAM 2	Points	Note
1	Femke Kok (NED)	60	60	60	60	60	60		360	Q
2	Yukino Yoshida (JPN)	48	43	22	31	43	48	60	295	Q
3	Erin Jackson (USA)	54	54	48	36	21	22	21	256	Q
4	Lee Na-hyun (KOR)	30	48	38	38	26	31	43	254	Q
5	Marrit Fledderus (NED)	38	38	43	48	48	36		251	Q
6	Anna Boersma (NED)	36	40	32	43	31	30	27	239	Q
7	Kaja Ziomek-Nogal (POL)	43	23	0	28	34	54	54	236	Q
8	Serena Pergher (ITA)	34	25	36	29	40	29	36	229	Q
9	Martyna Baran (POL)	26	36	30	32	24	40	40	228	Q
10	Sophie Warmuth (GER)	27	27	31	26	32	43	38	224	Q
11	Kim Min-sun (KOR)	24	24	24	28	36	38	48	222	Q
12	Chen Ying-chu (TPE)	28	29	54	30	27	27	25	220	Q
13	Jutta Leerdam (NED)	40	31	40	54	54			219	
14	Béatrice Lamarche (CAN)	32	32	27	34	30	32	24	211	Q
15	Kristina Silaeva (KAZ)	25	30	34	24	30	34	29	206	Q
16	Andżelika Wójcik (POL)	31	34	29	25	25	28	28	200	Q
17	Tian Ruining (CHN)	29	26	25	27	28	26	34	195	Q
18	Rio Yamada (JPN)	12	28	23	24	23	25	31	166	Q
19	Angel Daleman (NED)	28	28	28	40	38			162	
20	Carolina Hiller-Donnelly (CAN)	7	21	24	17	17	28	30	144	Q
21	Kurumi Inagawa (JPN)	23	24	26	15	16	12	22	138	Q
22	Brooklyn McDougall (CAN)	14	17	16	21	22	11	26	127	Q
23	Wang Jingziqian (CHN)	10	11	13	14	21	24	28	121	Q
24	Sofia Thorup (DEN)	11		21	21	15	24	23	115	
25	Pei Chong (CHN)	24	22	10	16	9	9	21	111	
26	Iori Kitahara (JPN)	21	21	15	13	14	8	17	109	
27	Jung Huidan (KOR)	15	14	8	12	10	13	24	96	
28	Vanessa Herzog (AUT)	22	16	21	23				82	
29	Karolina Bosiek (POL)	4	15	9	11	11	16	11	77	
30	Julie Nistad Samsonsen (NOR)	8	9	14	10	5	17	13	76	
31	Nadezhda Morozova (KAZ)	16		28	22				66	
32	Fran Vanhoutte (BEL)	5	12	12	5	8	7	15	64	
33	Jenna Larter (CAN)	9	13	11	3	7	5	12	60	
34	Anna Ostlender (GER)	6	10	7	9	12	11	5	60	
35	Nikola Zdráhalová (CZE)			3	8	24	23		58	
36	Sarah Warren (USA)	13	7	6	4	6	15	7	58	
37	Ellia Smeding (GBR)		6		6	13	14	14	53	
38	Chrysta Rands-Evans (USA)	21	4	1	2	3	2	6	39	
39	Dione Voskamp (NED)							32	32	
40	Miho Takagi (JPN)					28			28	
41	Shi Xiaoxuan (CHN)	2	0	4	7	2	0	10	25	
42	Maria Victoria Rodriguez (ARG)	3	5	0	0	0	0	16	24	
43	Isabel Grevelt (NED)						21		21	
44	Suzanne Schulting (NED)						21		21	
45	Maybritt Vigl (ITA)	1	8	0	0	1	4	4	18	
46	Brittany Bowe (USA)	17							17	
47	Mckenzie Browne (USA)	0	1	0	0	0	3	9	13	
48	Mathilde Pédronno (FRA)	0	0	0	0	0	1	9	10	
49	Ju-Lin de Visser (TPE)	0	0	0	0	0	6	1	7	
50	Anna Kubo (JPN)	0	2	5	0				7	
51	Isabelle van Elst (BEL)			0		4			4	
52	Sofie Adeberg (GER)	0	3	0	0				3	
53	Luisa María González (ESP)	0	0	0	0	0	0	3	3	
54	Rose Laliberté-Roy (CAN)			2	1				3	
55	Hanna Biró (HUN)	0	0	0	0	0	0	2	2	
56	Mihaela Hogas (ROU)	0	0	0	0				0	
57	Giorgia Aiello (ITA)	0	0	0	0				0	
58	Kaitlyn McGregor (SUI)			0					0	
59	Laura Kivioja (FIN)	0	0	0	0	0	0	0	0	
60	Alena Lifatova (KAZ)	0	0			0	0	0	0	
61	Arina Ilyachsehenko (KAZ)			0	0	0	0		0	
62	Jasmin Güntert (SUI)	0	0		0				0	
63	Jéssica Carolina Santos Rodrigues (POR)	0		0	0	0	0		0	
64	Anne Sofie Knutsen Birkedal (NOR)						0	0	0	
65	Marte Bjerkreim Furnee (NOR)					0			0	

=== Women's 1000m ===
The top 21 athletes, with a maximum of 3 per NOC, will earn a quota for their country. After allocations were finalized only 20 quotas were given at this stage.

Pos.	Racer	(United States) SLC	(Canada) CGY	(Netherlands) HEE	(Norway) HAM	Points	Note
1	Femke Kok (NED)	54	60	48	54	216	Q
2	Marrit Fledderus (NED)	43	48	30	48	169	Q
3	Brittany Bowe (USA)	40	40	43	43	166	Q
4	Jutta Leerdam (NED)	60	43	60		163	Q
5	Béatrice Lamarche (CAN)	48	38	38	31	155	Q
6	Miho Takagi (JPN)		36	54	60	150	Q
7	Rio Yamada (JPN)	38	31	36	38	143	Q
8	Isabel Grevelt (NED)	31	54	25	22	132	
9	Lee Na-hyun (KOR)	30	28	34	40	132	Q
10	Yin Qi (CHN)	29	30	28	30	117	Q
11	Ellia Smeding (GBR)	28	25	31	28	112	Q
12	Kim Min-sun (KOR)	21	29	29	29	108	Q
13	Antoinette Rijpma-de Jong (NED)	32	32	40		104	
14	Karolina Bosiek (POL)	28	23	22	26	99	Q
15	Alexa Scott (CAN)	24	26	24	25	99	Q
16	Erin Jackson (USA)	34	22	21	21	98	Q
17	Yukino Yoshida (JPN)	27	34	32		93	Q
18	Sofia Thorup (DEN)	9	28	27	28	92	Q (Note: quota withdrawn by ISU)
19	Elizaveta Golubeva (KAZ)	15	24	26	27	92	Q
20	Han Mei (CHN)		27	28	36	91	Q
21	Nikola Zdráhalová (CZE)	16	17	24	34	91	Q
22	Isabelle van Elst (BEL)	26	24	16	24	90	Q
23	Nadezhda Morozova (KAZ)	36	0	21	32	89	Q
24	Natalia Czerwonka (POL)	25	14	17	21	77	
25	Lea Sophie Scholz (GER)	24	13	12	14	63	
26	Kaitlyn McGregor (SUI)	17	16	9	13	55	
27	Vanessa Herzog (AUT)	7	21	23		51	
28	Iga Wojtasik (POL)	22	5	10	12	49	
29	Sumire Kikuchi (JPN)	23	10	0	15	48	
30	Anna Ostlender (GER)	13	15	11	8	47	
31	Tian Ruining (CHN)	14	9	15	6	44	
32	Fran Vanhoutte (BEL)	8	12	7	16	43	
33	Maddison Pearman (CAN)	12	0	8	17	37	
34	Kristina Silaeva (KAZ)	11	11	13		35	
35	Anna Kubo (JPN)	21	8			29	
36	Meike Veen (NED)				24	24	
37	Arina Ilyachsehenko (KAZ)		0	14	10	24	
38	Suzanne Schulting (NED)				23	23	
39	Mia Manganello (USA)	5	0	5	11	21	
40	Sarah Warren (USA)	6	1	4	9	20	
41	Natalia Jabrzyk (POL)	2	3	1	7	13	
42	Maybritt Vigl (ITA)	3	6	2	1	12	
43	Chrysta Rands-Evans (USA)	0	0	6	5	11	
44	Jeannine Rosner (AUT)	10				10	
45	Brooklyn McDougall (CAN)	1	7	0	0	8	
46	Lim Lee-won (KOR)	4	0	0	2	6	
47	Jung Huidan (KOR)	0	0	3	3	6	
48	Serena Pergher (ITA)	0	4	0		4	
49	Iori Kitahara (JPN)			0	4	4	
50	Chen Ying-chu (TPE)	0	2	0		2	
51	Sofie Adeberg (GER)	0	0	0		0	
52	Julie Nistad Samsonsen (NOR)	0	0			0	
53	Hana Noake (JPN)	0				0	
54	Pei Chong (CHN)	0				0	
55	Rose Laliberté-Roy (CAN)		0			0	
56	Mihaela Hogas (ROU)	0	0			0	
57	Vera Güntert (SUI)	0	0			0	
58	Alena Lifatova (KAZ)	0			0	0	
59	Laura Kivioja (FIN)	0	0	0	0	0	
60	Maria Victoria Rodriguez (ARG)	0	0			0	
61	Sara Cabrera (ESP)	0	0	0	0	0	
62	Mathilde Pédronno (FRA)	0	0	0	0	0	
63	Jéssica Carolina Santos Rodrigues (POR)	0	0	0	0	0	
64	Marte Bjerkreim Furnee (NOR)	0	0			0	
65	Abigél Mercs (HUN)	0	0	0		0	
66	Veronika Antošová (CZE)	0	0			0	
67	Ju-Lin De Visser (TPE)				0	0	
68	Ramona Härdi (SUI)				0	0	
69	Anne Sofie Knutsen Birkedal (NOR)				0	0	

=== Women's 1500m ===
The top 21 athletes, with a maximum of 3 per NOC, will earn a quota for their country.

Pos.	Racer	(United States) SLC	(Canada) CGY	(Netherlands) HEE	(Norway) HAM	Points	Note
1	Miho Takagi (JPN)	40	54	40	60	194	Q
2	Antoinette Rijpma-de Jong (NED)	54	43	54	36	187	Q
3	Joy Beune (NED)	60	60	60		180	Q
4	Ragne Wiklund (NOR)	48	40	34	48	170	Q
5	Brittany Bowe (USA)	38	48	43	40	169	Q
6	Nadezhda Morozova (KAZ)	28	28	36	54	146	Q
7	Nikola Zdráhalová (CZE)	34	36	32	43	145	Q
8	Ivanie Blondin (CAN)	30	31	48	31	140	Q
9	Melissa Wijfje (NED)	43	34	28	32	137	Q
10	Han Mei (CHN)	29	38	31	30	128	Q
11	Kaitlyn McGregor (SUI)	24	32	29	29	114	Q
12	Isabelle van Elst (BEL)	27	29	26	27	109	Q
13	Elizaveta Golubeva (KAZ)	21	30	23	34	108	Q
14	Valérie Maltais (CAN)	14	28	25	38	105	Q
15	Ayano Sato (JPN)	31	26	22	26	105	Q
16	Angel Daleman (NED)	36	27	38		101	
17	Francesca Lollobrigida (ITA)	28	25	24	22	99	Q
18	Yang Binyu (CHN)	17	21	27	28	93	Q
19	Greta Myers (USA)	24	23	21	24	92	Q
20	Marijke Groenewoud (NED)	22	24	30		76	
21	Natalia Czerwonka (POL)		14	28	25	67	Q
22	Isabelle Weidemann (CAN)	9	10	17	24	60	Q
23	Yin Qi (CHN)	16	13	9	21	59	Q
24	Li Jiaxuan (CHN)	32	0	8	17	57	
25	Momoka Horikawa (JPN)	23	22	11		56	
26	Lea Sophie Scholz (GER)	12	15	14	13	54	
27	Sofia Thorup (DEN)	13	11	12	15	51	
28	Alexandra Sayutina (AIN)	0	3	24	23	50	
29	Béatrice Lamarche (CAN)	25	24			49	
30	Ahenaer Adake (CHN)	11	16	6	14	47	
31	Park Ji-woo (KOR)	15	2	16	10	43	
32	Martina Sáblíková (CZE)	26			16	42	
33	Zofia Braun (POL)	21		21	0	42	
34	Jeannine Rosner (AUT)	10	17	3	12	42	
35	Meike Veen (NED)				28	28	
36	Ellia Smeding (GBR)	6	9	13		28	
37	Lim Lee-won (KOR)	7	4	7	7	25	
38	Sandrine Tas (BEL)	4		15	3	22	
39	Aurora Grinden Løvås (NOR)	5	8	0	8	21	
40	Kang Soo-min (KOR)	8	0	10	1	19	
41	Arina Ilyachsehenko (KAZ)	2	1	4	11	18	
42	Alexa Scott (CAN)		6	5	6	17	
43	Rio Yamada (JPN)		12			12	
44	Hana Noake (JPN)			1	9	10	
45	Natalia Jabrzyk (POL)	3	5			8	
46	Vanessa Herzog (AUT)		7			7	
47	Kyoko Nitta (JPN)	0	0	2	5	7	
48	Emily Tormen (ITA)	0	0	0	4	4	
49	Marlen Ehseluns (GER)	0		0	2	2	
50	Linda Rossi (ITA)	1				1	
51	Isabel Kraus (GER)	0	0			0	
52	Violette Braun (FRA)	0	0	0	0	0	
53	Ramona Härdi (SUI)	0	0	0	0	0	
54	Giorgia Birkeland (USA)	0	0	0	0	0	
55	Sofie Adeberg (GER)		0			0	
56	Sarah Warren (USA)	0				0	
57	Lucie Korvasová (CZE)	0	0	0	0	0	
58	Arianna Fontana (ITA)		0			0	
59	Anna Kubo (JPN)	0				0	
60	Ju-Lin de Visser (TPE)	0	0	0	0	0	
61	Mia Manganello (USA)			0	0	0	
62	Sumire Kikuchi (JPN)				0	0	
63	Abigél Mercs (HUN)	0	0	0		0	
64	Chrysta Rands-Evans (USA)	0				0	
65	Marte Bjerkreim Furnee (NOR)				0	0	
66	Natascha Lindenskov (DEN)	0	0	0	0	0	
67	Anna Molnar (AUT)	0		0	0	0	
68	Maira Jasch (GER)			0		0	
69	Zuzana Kuršová (CZE)		0			0	

=== Women's 3000m and 5000m ===
The qualification points ranking for the women's 3000m and 5000m are combined. The top 15 athletes, with a maximum of 3 per NOC, will earn a quota for their country in the 3000m. The top 9 athletes, with a maximum of 2 per NOC, will earn a quota for their country in the 5000m.

Pos.	Racer	(United States) SLC	(Canada) CGY	(Netherlands) HEE	(Norway) HAM	Points	Note
1	Ragne Wiklund (NOR)	48	54	60	48	210	Q
2	Isabelle Weidemann (CAN)	40	43	54	54	191	Q
3	Valérie Maltais (CAN)	54	48	29	43	174	Q
4	Joy Beune (NED)	60	60	48		168	Q
5	Marijke Groenewoud (NED)	29	27	32	60	148	Q
6	Francesca Lollobrigida (ITA)	43	38	36	30	147	Q
7	Martina Sáblíková (CZE)	38	32	38	36	144	Q
8	Sandrine Tas (BEL)	32	36	43	32	143	Q
9	Nadezhda Morozova (KAZ)	32	40	30	40	142	Q
10	Ivanie Blondin (CAN)	34	34	31	31	130	q
11	Bente Kerkhoff (NED)	36	29	34	29	128	q
12	Sanne In 't Hof (NED)	20	28	36	38	122	
13	Maryna Zuyeva (AIN)	28	28	25	34	115	q
14	Tai Zhien (CHN)	30	31	21	25	107	q
15	Josie Hofmann (GER)	9	32	32	28	101	q
16	Momoka Horikawa (JPN)	31	26	14	26	97	q
17	Kseniia Korzhova (AIN)	25	30		32	87	
18	Yang Binyu (CHN)	25	19	24	19	87	
19	Violette Braun (FRA)	15	20	23	28	86	
20	Maira Jasch (GER)	19	8	29	27	83	
21	Laura Hall (CAN)	28	25	18	12	83	
22	Jeannine Rosner (AUT)	18	25	15	25	83	
23	Linda Rossi (ITA)	17	13	22	16	68	
24	Josephine Schlörb (GER)	26	10	10	8	54	
25	Greta Myers (USA)	14	18	20		52	
26	Ahenaer Adake (CHN)	7	6	16	18	47	
27	Li Jiaxuan (CHN)	11	17	0	14	42	
28	Park Ji-woo (KOR)	12	0	13	17	42	
29	Merel Conijn (NED)			40		40	
30	Magdalena Czyszczoń (POL)	2	5	9	20	36	
31	Elizaveta Golubeva (KAZ)	21	12			33	
32	Miho Takagi (JPN)	16	16			32	
33	Kaitlyn McGregor (SUI)	10	21			31	
34	Zofia Braun (POL)	4	7	12	7	30	
35	Elisa Dul (NED)	27	2			29	
36	Giorgia Birkeland (USA)	5	3	17	3	28	
37	Nikola Zdráhalová (CZE)	13	15			28	
38	Hana Noake (JPN)	0	4	8	15	27	
39	Han Mei (CHN)	8	14			22	
40	Melissa Wijfje (NED)				21	21	
41	Kyoko Nitta (JPN)		0	11	10	21	
42	Aurora Grinden Løvås (NOR)	0	9		11	20	
43	Laura Lorenzato (ITA)			19	0	19	
44	Julia Nizan (FRA)	6	0	4	9	19	
45	Marlen Ehseluns (GER)	3	0	0	13	16	
46	Ayano Sato (JPN)	0	11			11	
47	Ramona Härdi (SUI)	1		5	4	10	
48	Ingrid Håkegård Eichler (NOR)			7	0	7	
49	Abigail Mccluskey (CAN)	0	1		6	7	
50	Lucie Korvasová (CZE)	0	0	6	0	6	
51	Marte Bjerkreim Furnee (NOR)			1	5	6	
52	Laurie Cayer (CAN)			3		3	
53	Jin Wenjing (CHN)			2		2	
53	Hou Jundan (CHN)				2	2	
55	Anna Molnar (AUT)	0	0	0	1	1	
56	Anastasiia Grigoreva (AIN)			0		0	
56	Marley Soldan (USA)	0				0	
56	Piper Yde (USA)	0				0	
56	Alice Marletti (ITA)	0	0			0	
56	Mia Manganello (USA)	0	0			0	
56	Akane Iida (JPN)	0				0	
56	Arina Ilyachsehenko (KAZ)	0				0	
56	Dina Storelid (NOR)	0	0		0	0	
56	Zuzana Kuršová (CZE)	0	0	0	0	0	
56	Natascha Lindenskov (DEN)	0	0	0	0	0	
56	Gemma Cooper (GBR)	0	0	0	0	0	
56	Abigél Mercs (HUN)		0			0	
56	Nadja Wenger (SUI)		0	0	0	0	

=== Women's Mass Start ===
The top 24 athletes, with a maximum of 2 per NOC, will earn a quota for their country in the mass start. The next 8 athletes will be on the reserve list. Up to six additional starting positions for the mass start will be made available during the games, given in reserve order, with priority given to countries that do not yet have an entry. However, only skaters that already took part in another event will be eligible. After allocations were finalized only 23 quotas were given making seven starting positions available during the games.

Pos.	Racer	(United States) SLC	(Canada) CGY	(Netherlands) HEE	(Norway) HAM	Points	Note
1	Mia Manganello (USA)	60	48	54	43	205	Q
2	Marijke Groenewoud (NED)	24	54	60	54	192	Q
3	Ivanie Blondin (CAN)	40	60	43	48	191	Q
4	Valérie Maltais (CAN)	54	43	30	40	167	Q
5	Bente Kerkhoff (NED)	48	28	22	60	158	Q
6	Park Ji-woo (KOR)	31	40	48	38	157	Q
7	Francesca Lollobrigida (ITA)	36	38	28	36	138	Q
8	Hou Jundan (CHN)	34	31	40	27	132	Q
9	Kaitlyn McGregor (SUI)	29	29	36	34	128	Q
10	Ramona Härdi (SUI)	23	36	29	32	120	Q
11	Ayano Sato (JPN)	38	23	38	19	118	Q
12	Fran Vanhoutte (BEL)	30	32	26	28	116	Q
13	Jeannine Rosner (AUT)	25	20	32	30	107	Q
14	Momoka Horikawa (JPN)	43	18	21	24	106	Q
15	Greta Myers (USA)	27	30	24	25	106	Q
16	Aurora Grinden Løvås (NOR)	18	34	23	29	104	Q
17	Josephine Schlörb (GER)	32	25	20	22	99	Q
18	Yang Binyu (CHN)	28	26	27	18	99	Q
19	Lim Lee-won (KOR)	26	24	25	23	98	Q
20	Anastasiia Semenova (AIN)	17	21	31	26	95	Q
21	Elizaveta Golubeva (KAZ)	20	22	18	31	91	Q
22	Sandrine Tas (BEL)	21	19	34	15	89	Q
23	Josie Hofmann (GER)	22	27	18	14	81	Q
24	Jéssica Carolina Santos Rodrigues (POR) (Note: During the allocation process this quota was withdrawn by the ISU. Since it is the only athlete from Portugal they were not present at the games and could not be a reserve.)	13	15	19	21	68	
25	Linda Rossi (ITA)	15	16	16	16	63	R5
26	Julia Nizan (FRA)	4	17	17	17	55	R1
27	Violette Braun (FRA)	14	12	14	12	52	R6
28	Natalia Jabrzyk (POL)	19	9	11	11	50	R2
29	Maryna Zuyeva (AIN)	2	11	13	20	46	R7
30	Lucie Korvasová (CZE)	20	10	5	6	41	R3
31	Anna Molnar (AUT)	12	8	12	8	40	R8
32	Abigél Mercs (HUN)	9	14	6	9	38	R4
33	Natascha Lindenskov (DEN)	11	13	9	4	37	
34	Zuzana Kuršová (CZE)	7	6	10	10	33	
35	Gemma Cooper (GBR)	6	3	4	13	26	
36	Olga Piotrowska (POL)	5	5	8	7	25	
37	Sara Cabrera (ESP)	3	7	3	5	18	
38	Marte Bjerkreim Furnee (NOR)	10	4	2		16	
39	Sofia Thorup (DEN)	8				8	
40	Arina Ilyachsehenko (KAZ)	1		7		8	

=== Women's Team pursuit ===
The top six nations will earn a quota for the Team pursuit.

Pos.	Racer	(United States) SLC	(Canada) CGY	(Norway) HAM	Points	Note
1	Canada	54	54	60	168	Q
2	Japan	60	48	48	156	Q
3	United States	48	43	54	145	Q
4	Netherlands	40	60	34	134	Q
5	Germany	43	40	36	119	Q
6	China	38	38	43	119	Q
7	Norway	36	40	40	116	
8	Kazakhstan	40	36	38	114	
9	Belgium	36	34	40	110	
10	Poland	33	33	36	102	
11	Switzerland	28	36	33	97	
12	Italy	34	29		63	
13	South Korea	27	28		55	
14	Czech Republic	29			29	

== Time Ranking ==
=== Men's 500m ===
The top 7 athletes not qualified through the point ranking, with a maximum of 3 per NOC, will earn a quota for their country. The top 8 unqualified athletes will form the reserve list, with athletes from unqualified countries having priority. Up to two additional starting positions will be made available during the games, given in reserve order. However, only skaters that already took part in another event will be eligible. After allocations were finalized only 6 quotas were given making three starting positions available during the games.

Pos.	Racer	Best Time	Note
1	Jenning de Boo (NED)	33.636	PQ
2	Yevgeniy Koshkin (KAZ)	33.679	PQ
3	Kim Joon-ho (KOR)	33.781	PQ
4	Jordan Stolz (USA)	33.791	PQ
5	Damian Żurek (POL)	33.852	PQ
6	Xue Zhiwen (CHN)	33.853	PQ
7	Gao Tingyu (CHN)	33.938	PQ
8	Wataru Morishige (JPN)	33.943	PQ
9	Bjørn Magnussen (NOR)	33.993	PQ
10	Marek Kania (POL)	34.019	PQ
11	Cooper Mcleod (USA)	34.046	PQ
12	Laurent Dubreuil (CAN)	34.052	PQ
13	Koo Kyung-min (KOR)	34.065	PQ
14	Cédrick Brunet (CAN)	34.068	PQ
15	Tatsuya Shinhama (JPN)	34.077	PQ
16	Sebas Diniz (NED)	34.110	PQ
17	Marten Liiv (EST)	34.122	PQ
18	Katsuhiro Kuratsubo (JPN)	34.136	
19	Lian Ziwen (CHN)	34.137	PQ
20	Yuta Hirose (JPN)	34.242	PQ
21	Chung Jae-woong (KOR)	34.303	Q
22	Yuma Murakami (JPN)	34.305	
23	Christopher Fiola (CAN)	34.312	Q
24	Joep Wennemars (NED)	34.323	PQ
25	Nil Llop Izquierdo (ESP)	34.359	Q
26	Zach Stoppelmoor (USA)	34.371	Q
27	Du Haonan (CHN)	34.375	
28	Stefan Westenbroek (NED)	34.397	
29	Anders Johnson (CAN)	34.401	
30	Merijn Scheperkamp (NED)	34.441	
31	Yankun Zhao (CAN)	34.444	
32	Piotr Michalski (POL)	34.468	PQ
33	Siver Brattgjerd (NOR)	34.490	Q
34	Cho Sang-hyeok (KOR)	34.530	
35	Henrik Fagerli Rukke (NOR)	34.555	R4
36	Altay Zhardembekuly (KAZ)	34.586	R5
37	Alec Sklutovsky (USA)	34.626	
38	Artur Galiyev (KAZ)	34.629	R6
39	Jeffrey Rosanelli (ITA)	34.637	QH
40	Liu Ze (CHN)	34.661	
41	Conor McDermott-Mostowy (USA)	34.689	
42	David Bosa (ITA)	34.769	R7
43	Kacper Abratkiewicz (POL)	34.804	
44	Tai Wei-lin (TPE)	34.872	R1
45	Moritz Klein (GER)	35.053	R2
46	Maximilian Strübe (GER)	35.074	R8
47	Daniel Milagros (ESP)	35.090	R9
48	Dai Dai Ntab (NED)	35.113	
49	Cristian Landrø Magnussen (NOR)	35.129	
50	Ignaz Gschwentner (AUT)	35.204	R3
51	Cornelius Kersten (GBR)	35.241	
52	Oliver Grob (SUI)	35.241	
53	Szymon Wojtakowski (POL)	35.288	
54	Tuukka Suomalainen (FIN)	35.317	
55	Serge Yoro (NED)	35.322	
56	Gabriel Eduard Nitu (ROU)	35.355	
57	Mathias Vosté (BEL)	35.427	
58	Min-seok Kim (HUN)	35.497	
59	Sebastian Forsmark (SWE)	35.500	
60	Erik Resell (NOR)	35.543	
61	Joonas Valge (EST)	35.677	
62	Mateusz Śliwka (POL)	35.787	
63	Robbe Beelen (BEL)	35.906	
64	Kai In 't Veld (GRE)	36.037	
65	Max Kokko (FIN)	36.059	
66	Botond Bejczi (HUN)	36.114	
67	Bálint Bödei (HUN)	36.136	
68	Hendrik Dombek (GER)	36.410	
69	Prokop Stodola (CZE)	36.887	

=== Men's 1000m ===
The top 7 athletes not qualified through the point ranking, with a maximum of 3 per NOC, will earn a quota for their country. The top 8 unqualified athletes will form the reserve list, with athletes from unqualified countries having priority. Up to two additional starting positions will be made available during the games, given in reserve order. However, only skaters that already took part in another event will be eligible. After allocations were finalized only 6 quotas were given making three starting positions available during the games.

Pos.	Racer	Best Time	Note
1	Jordan Stolz (USA)	1:05.665	PQ
2	Damian Żurek (POL)	1:06.027	PQ
3	Jenning de Boo (NED)	1:06.112	PQ
4	Joep Wennemars (NED)	1:06.441	PQ
5	Ning Zhongyan (CHN)	1:06.479	PQ
6	Finn Sonnekalb (GER)	1:06.483	PQ
7	Cooper Mcleod (USA)	1:06.621	PQ
8	Tim Prins (NED)	1:06.642	PQ
9	Marten Liiv (EST)	1:06.733	PQ
10	Lian Ziwen (CHN)	1:06.736	PQ
11	Ryota Kojima (JPN)	1:07.000	PQ
12	Conor McDermott-Mostowy (USA)	1:07.023	PQ
13	Kjeld Nuis (NED)	1:07.133	
14	Marek Kania (POL)	1:07.300	PQ
15	Taiyo Nonomura (JPN)	1:07.323	PQ
16	Hendrik Dombek (GER)	1:07.369	PQ
17	Piotr Michalski (POL)	1:07.672	PQ
18	Oh Hyun-min (KOR)	1:07.684	Q
19	Laurent Dubreuil (CAN)	1:07.757	Q
20	Moritz Klein (GER)	1:07.763	PQ
21	Mathias Vosté (BEL)	1:07.765	PQ
22	Kazuya Yamada (JPN)	1:07.768	Q
23	Koo Kyung-min (KOR)	1:07.795	Q
24	Min-seok Kim (HUN)	1:07.855	Q
25	Gabriel Odor (AUT)	1:07.920	PQ
26	Bjørn Magnussen (NOR)	1:07.974	PQ
27	Daniele Di Stefano (ITA)	1:07.997	PQ
28	Szymon Wojtakowski (POL)	1:08.019	
29	Nil Llop Izquierdo (ESP)	1:08.070	Q
30	Anders Johnson (CAN)	1:08.072	R4
31	Wataru Morishige (JPN)	1:08.090	
32	Katsuhiro Kuratsubo (JPN)	1:08.166	
33	Yankun Zhao (CAN)	1:08.228	R5
34	Cornelius Kersten (GBR)	1:08.290	R1
35	Artur Galiyev (KAZ)	1:08.352	R2
36	Kai Verbij (NED)	1:08.382	
37	David Bosa (ITA)	1:08.413	R6
38	Zach Stoppelmoor (USA)	1:08.449	
39	Deng Zhihan (CHN)	1:08.476	R7
40	Kim Tae-yun (KOR)	1:08.488	R8
41	Alessio Trentini (ITA)	1:08.601	R9
42	Valentin Thiebault (FRA)	1:08.605	R3
43	Stefan Emele (GER)	1:08.785	
44	Kai In 't Veld (GRE)	1:08.793	
45	Masaya Yamada (JPN)	1:08.833	
46	Serge Yoro (NED)	1:08.917	
47	Tai Wei-lin (TPE)	1:08.937	
48	Park Seong-hyeon (KOR)	1:09.030	
49	Henrik Fagerli Rukke (NOR)	1:09.066	
50	Merijn Scheperkamp (NED)	1:09.092	
51	Liu Ze (CHN)	1:09.229	
52	Allan Dahl Johansson (NOR)	1:09.298	
53	Tyson Langelaar (CAN)	1:09.343	
54	David La Rue (CAN)	1:09.383	
55	Cho Sang-hyeok (KOR)	1:09.443	
56	Konrád Nagy (HUN)	1:09.635	
57	Tatsuya Shinhama (JPN)	1:09.651	
58	Connor Howe (CAN)	1:09.662	
59	Robbe Beelen (BEL)	1:09.686	
60	Finn Elias Haneberg (NOR)	1:09.808	
61	Sebastian Forsmark (SWE)	1:09.815	
62	Jonathan Tobon (USA)	1:09.858	
63	Flavio Gross (SUI)	1:09.877	
64	Francesco Betti (ITA)	1:09.908	
65	Mateusz Śliwka (POL)	1:10.021	
66	Cédrick Brunet (CAN)	1:10.034	
67	Erik Resell (NOR)	1:10.201	
68	Ignaz Gschwentner (AUT)	1:10.390	
69	Botond Bejczi (HUN)	1:10.502	
70	Jeffrey Rosanelli (ITA)	1:10.630	
71	Tuukka Suomalainen (FIN)	1:10.643	
72	Cosmin Nedelea (ROU)	1:10.817	
73	Joonas Valge (EST)	1:11.009	
74	Cristian Landrø Magnussen (NOR)	1:11.671	
75	Gabriel Eduard Nitu (ROU)	1:11.765	
76	Daniel Milagros (ESP)	1:11.801	
77	Juuso Lehtonen (FIN)	1:12.114	
78	Bálint Bödei (HUN)	1:12.638	
79	Prokop Stodola (CZE)	1:13.288	

=== Men's 1500m ===
The top 7 athletes not qualified through the point ranking, with a maximum of 3 per NOC, will earn a quota for their country. The top 8 unqualified athletes will form the reserve list, with athletes from unqualified countries having priority. Up to two additional starting positions will be made available during the games, given in reserve order. However, only skaters that already took part in another event will be eligible. After allocations were finalized only 6 quotas were given making three starting positions available during the games.

Pos.	Racer	Best Time	Note
1	Jordan Stolz (USA)	1:40.483	PQ
2	Ning Zhongyan (CHN)	1:41.029	PQ
3	Finn Sonnekalb (GER)	1:41.334	PQ
4	Peder Kongshaug (NOR)	1:41.345	PQ
5	Kjeld Nuis (NED)	1:41.379	PQ
6	Kazuya Yamada (JPN)	1:42.258	PQ
7	Joep Wennemars (NED)	1:42.342	PQ
8	Tim Prins (NED)	1:42.369	PQ
9	Min-seok Kim (HUN)	1:42.678	PQ
10	Daniele Di Stefano (ITA)	1:42.746	PQ
11	Didrik Eng Strand (NOR)	1:42.926	PQ
12	Taiyo Nonomura (JPN)	1:42.934	PQ
13	David La Rue (CAN)	1:42.934	PQ
14	Alexander Farthofer (AUT)	1:42.974	PQ
15	Liu Hanbin (CHN)	1:43.033	PQ
16	Hendrik Dombek (GER)	1:43.086	PQ
17	Wesly Dijs (NED)	1:43.107	
18	Tijmen Snel (NED)	1:43.143	
19	Gabriel Odor (AUT)	1:43.182	PQ
20	Valentin Thiebault (FRA)	1:43.250	PQ
21	Emery Lehman (USA)	1:43.261	Q
22	Antoine Gélinas-Beaulieu (CAN)	1:43.288	Q
23	Sander Eitrem (NOR)	1:43.352	PQ
24	Vladimir Semirunniy (POL)	1:43.410	PQ
25	Casey Dawson (USA)	1:43.504	Q
26	Moritz Klein (GER)	1:43.604	Q
27	Motonaga Arito (JPN)	1:43.688	Q
28	Mathias Vosté (BEL)	1:43.820	Q
29	Metoděj Jílek (CZE)	1:43.911	PQ
30	Li Wenhao (CHN)	1:43.982	R5
31	Szymon Wojtakowski (POL)	1:44.173	R6
32	Ethan Cepuran (USA)	1:44.242	
33	Kotaro Kasahara (JPN)	1:44.265	
34	Conor McDermott-Mostowy (USA)	1:44.432	
35	Marten Liiv (EST)	1:44.510	R1
36	Gabriel Groß (GER)	1:44.634	
37	Livio Wenger (SUI)	1:44.803	R2
38	Yang Ho-jun (KOR)	1:44.831	R3
39	Viktor Rudenko (AIN)	1:44.878	R4
40	Park Seong-hyeon (KOR)	1:44.958	R7
41	Francesco Betti (ITA)	1:45.119	R8
42	Indra Medard (BEL)	1:45.436	R9
43	Viktor Hald Thorup (DEN)	1:45.440	
44	Kai In 't Veld (GRE)	1:45.488	
45	Riccardo Lorello (ITA)	1:45.577	
46	Mathieu Belloir (FRA)	1:45.661	
47	Ryan Kulbacki (CAN)	1:45.703	
48	Connor Howe (CAN)	1:45.718	
49	Ryota Kojima (JPN)	1:45.873	
50	Sigurd Holbø Dyrset (NOR)	1:45.892	
51	Tai Wei-lin (TPE)	1:45.910	
52	Peter Michael (NZL)	1:45.920	
53	Finn Elias Haneberg (NOR)	1:46.049	
54	Roman Binazarov (KAZ)	1:46.127	
55	Masaya Yamada (JPN)	1:46.158	
56	Cornelius Kersten (GBR)	1:46.168	
57	Allan Dahl Johansson (NOR)	1:46.180	
58	Tyson Langelaar (CAN)	1:46.268	
59	Jake Weidemann (CAN)	1:46.321	
60	Flavio Gross (SUI)	1:46.561	
61	Konrád Nagy (HUN)	1:46.766	
62	Manuel Robla (ESP)	1:47.103	
63	Serge Yoro (NED)	1:47.177	
64	Bálint Bödei (HUN)	1:47.631	
65	Juuso Lehtonen (FIN)	1:47.922	
66	Afonso Henrique Pestana Silva (POR)	1:48.855	
67	Lukas Stekly (SVK)	1:49.384	
68	Danila Semerikov (UZB)	1:49.531	
69	Alessio Trentini (ITA)	1:49.985	
70	Prokop Stodola (CZE)	1:50.247	
71	Daan Van Der Elst (BEL)	1:50.303	
72	Adrian Octavian Fierar (ROU)	1:50.398	
73	Botond Bejczi (HUN)	1:50.682	
74	Tadeáš Procházka (CZE)	1:51.147	
75	Ayitinama Yeerhanati (CHN)	1:52.395	
76	Yahor Damaratski (AIN)	no time	

=== Men's 5000m ===
The top 5 athletes not qualified through the point ranking, with a maximum of 3 per NOC, will earn a quota for their country. The top 8 unqualified athletes will form the reserve list, with athletes from unqualified countries having priority.

Pos.	Racer	Best Time	Note
1	Timothy Loubineaud (FRA)	6:00.237	PQ
2	Casey Dawson (USA)	6:01.841	PQ
3	Sander Eitrem (NOR)	6:01.869	PQ
4	Ted-Jan Bloemen (CAN)	6:02.261	PQ
5	Metoděj Jílek (CZE)	6:02.787	PQ
6	Alexander Farthofer (AUT)	6:04.214	PQ
7	Chris Huizinga (NED)	6:05.161	PQ
8	Davide Ghiotto (ITA)	6:05.797	PQ
9	Peder Kongshaug (NOR)	6:05.896	Q
10	Gabriel Groß (GER)	6:06.757	Q
11	Beau Snellink (NED)	6:06.997	PQ
12	Riccardo Lorello (ITA)	6:07.861	Q
13	Michele Malfatti (ITA)	6:08.136	PQ
14	Kars Jansman (NED)	6:08.154	
15	Liu Hanbin (CHN)	6:08.363	Q
16	Felix Maly (GER)	6:08.571	PQ
17	Fridtjof Petzold (GER)	6:08.751	PQ
18	Shomu Sasaki (JPN)	6:08.834	Q
19	Vladimir Semirunniy (POL)	6:09.185	R1
20	Jorrit Bergsma (NED)	6:10.110	PQ
21	Thibault Métraux (SUI)	6:10.144	R2
22	Bart Swings (BEL)	6:10.810	PQ
23	Giovanni Trebouta (FRA)	6:11.950	R5
24	Sigurd Henriksen (NOR)	6:12.523	PQ
25	Ethan Cepuran (USA)	6:12.565	R6
26	Marcel Bosker (NED)	6:13.175	
27	Viktor Hald Thorup (DEN)	6:13.430	R3
28	Li Wenhao (CHN)	6:13.809	R7
29	Manuel Ghiotto (ITA)	6:13.863	
30	Patrick Beckert (GER)	6:13.890	
31	Peter Michael (NZL)	6:14.109	R4
32	Cong Zhenlong (CHN)	6:14.425	R8
33	Wu Yu (CHN)	6:15.105	
34	Danila Semerikov (UZB)	6:15.533	
35	Chung Jae-won (KOR)	6:16.034	
36	Livio Wenger (SUI)	6:16.419	
37	Graeme Fish (CAN)	6:16.434	
38	Daniel Hall (CAN)	6:16.579	
39	Yahor Damaratski (AIN)	6:17.220	
40	Taiyo Morino (JPN)	6:19.701	
41	Lukas Stekly (SVK)	6:20.669	
42	Didrik Eng Strand (NOR)	6:21.140	
43	Szymon Palka (POL)	6:21.473	
44	Andrea Giovannini (ITA)	6:21.622	
45	Motonaga Arito (JPN)	6:21.890	
46	Cho Seungmin (KOR)	6:22.785	
47	Jake Weidemann (CAN)	6:22.987	
48	Sigurd Holbø Dyrset (NOR)	6:23.176	
49	Riku Tsuchiya (JPN)	6:23.572	
50	Severin Widmer (SUI)	6:24.368	
51	Wojciech Gutowski (POL)	6:25.404	
52	Kotaro Kasahara (JPN)	6:25.594	
53	Vadim Yakubovskiy (KAZ)	6:27.279	
54	Adrian Octavian Fierar (ROU)	6:30.128	
55	Max Halyk (CAN)	6:31.086	
56	Philip Due Schmidt (DEN)	6:31.432	
57	Afonso Henrique Pestana Silva (POR)	6:32.311	
58	Manuel Robla (ESP)	6:33.576	
59	Kelin Dunfee (USA)	6:33.646	
60	Andrey Zuyev (KAZ)	6:34.594	
61	Filip Møller Nordal (NOR)	6:35.655	
62	Daan Van Der Elst (BEL)	6:37.451	
63	William Silk (USA)	6:37.573	
64	Vitaliy Chshigolev (KAZ)	6:37.987	
65	Bálint Bödei (HUN)	6:39.972	
66	Miguel Bravo (POR)	6:40.916	
67	Oddbjørn Mellemstrand (NOR)	6:41.262	
68	Tadeáš Procházka (CZE)	6:42.475	
69	Carl Platt (USA)	6:50.212	

=== Men's 10000m ===
The top 3 athletes not qualified through the point ranking, with a maximum of 3 per NOC, will earn a quota for their country. The top 8 unqualified athletes will form the reserve list, with athletes from unqualified countries having priority.

Pos.	Racer	Best Time	Note
1	Vladimir Semirunniy (POL)	12:28.052	Q
2	Metoděj Jílek (CZE)	12:29.636	PQ
3	Davide Ghiotto (ITA)	12:33.376	PQ
4	Timothy Loubineaud (FRA)	12:36.614	PQ
5	Sander Eitrem (NOR)	12:41.340	PQ
6	Bart Swings (BEL)	12:44.751	Q
7	Jorrit Bergsma (NED)	12:45.461	PQ
8	Riccardo Lorello (ITA)	12:46.934	
9	Casey Dawson (USA)	12:48.425	PQ
10	Sigurd Henriksen (NOR)	12:48.775	Q
11	Kars Jansman (NED)	12:49.652	
12	Ted-Jan Bloemen (CAN)	12:51.211	PQ
13	Viktor Hald Thorup (DEN)	12:51.887	R1
14	Fridtjof Petzold (GER)	12:52.880	R2
15	Andrea Giovannini (ITA)	12:53.983	
16	Manuel Ghiotto (ITA)	12:54.541	
17	Chris Huizinga (NED)	12:58.048	PQ
18	Graeme Fish (CAN)	13:01.422	R5
19	Michele Malfatti (ITA)	13:01.639	PQ
20	Giovanni Trebouta (FRA)	13:02.097	R6
21	Gabriel Groß (GER)	13:03.076	R7
22	Beau Snellink (NED)	13:04.771	
23	Patrick Beckert (GER)	13:04.971	
24	Wu Yu (CHN)	13:05.257	R3
25	Taiyo Morino (JPN)	13:06.495	R4
26	Cong Zhenlong (CHN)	13:06.860	R8
27	Felix Maly (GER)	13:08.131	
28	Thibault Métraux (SUI)	13:08.357	
29	Marcel Bosker (NED)	13:12.347	
30	Alexander Farthofer (AUT)	13:13.559	
31	Riku Tsuchiya (JPN)	13:14.489	
32	Chung Jae-won (KOR)	13:15.053	
33	Peter Michael (NZL)	13:15.756	
34	Daniil Naidenyshev (AIN)	13:16.531	
35	Szymon Palka (POL)	13:16.620	
36	Ethan Cepuran (USA)	13:17.759	
37	Motonaga Arito (JPN)	13:18.477	
38	Li Wenhao (CHN)	13:19.346	
39	Cho Seungmin (KOR)	13:20.434	
40	Sigurd Holbø Dyrset (NOR)	13:25.193	
41	Mateusz Śliwka (POL)	13:25.687	
42	Oddbjørn Mellemstrand (NOR)	13:29.166	
43	Shomu Sasaki (JPN)	13:30.608	
44	Kelin Dunfee (USA)	13:31.713	
45	Lukas Stekly (SVK)	13:32.054	
46	Severin Widmer (SUI)	13:32.834	
47	Daniel Hall (CAN)	13:36.558	
48	Miguel Bravo (POR)	13:41.260	
49	Andrey Zuyev (KAZ)	13:50.120	
50	Philip Due Schmidt (DEN)	13:50.718	
51	Daan Van Der Elst (BEL)	13:57.210	
52	Liu Hanbin (CHN)	no time	

=== Men's Team Pursuit ===
The top 2 countries not qualified through the point ranking will earn a quota. The top 4 unqualified countries will form the reserve list.

Pos.	Racer	Best Time	Note
1	United States	3:32.499	PQ
2	Norway	3:35.208	Q
3	China	3:36.654	PQ
4	Italy	3:37.957	PQ
5	France	3:37.974	PQ
6	Netherlands	3:38.656	PQ
7	Japan	3:38.908	Q
8	Germany	3:39.177	PQ
9	Poland	3:40.525	R1
10	South Korea	3:40.919	R2
11	Switzerland	3:41.238	R3
12	Canada	3:42.136	R4
13	Kazakhstan	3:48.012	
14	Hungary	3:48.324	
15	Belgium	3:48.396	
16	Czech Republic	3:52.443	

=== Women's 500m ===
The top 7 athletes not qualified through the point ranking, with a maximum of 3 per NOC, will earn a quota for their country. The top 8 unqualified athletes will form the reserve list, with athletes from unqualified countries having priority. Up to two additional starting positions will be made available during the games, given in reserve order. However, only skaters that already took part in another event will be eligible. After allocations were finalized only 5 quotas were given making four starting positions available during the games.

Pos.	Racer	Best Time	Note
1	Femke Kok (NED)	36.097	PQ
2	Erin Jackson (USA)	36.572	PQ
3	Yukino Yoshida (JPN)	36.885	PQ
4	Jutta Leerdam (NED)	37.012	
5	Lee Na-hyun (KOR)	37.030	PQ
6	Marrit Fledderus (NED)	37.084	PQ
7	Anna Boersma (NED)	37.112	PQ
8	Chen Ying-chu (TPE)	37.145	PQ
9	Kaja Ziomek-Nogal (POL)	37.170	PQ
10	Martyna Baran (POL)	37.261	PQ
11	Angel Daleman (NED)	37.283	
12	Serena Pergher (ITA)	37.292	PQ
13	Béatrice Lamarche (CAN)	37.309	PQ
14	Andżelika Wójcik (POL)	37.321	PQ
15	Kristina Silaeva (KAZ)	37.367	PQ
16	Tian Ruining (CHN)	37.413	PQ
17	Sophie Warmuth (GER)	37.428	PQ
18	Kim Min-sun (KOR)	37.463	PQ
19	Kurumi Inagawa (JPN)	37.574	PQ
20	Rio Yamada (JPN)	37.596	PQ
21	Brooklyn McDougall (CAN)	37.672	PQ
22	Carolina Hiller-Donnelly (CAN)	37.711	PQ
23	Nadezhda Morozova (KAZ)	37.734	Q
24	Pei Chong (CHN)	37.737	Q
25	Sofia Thorup (DEN)	37.851	Q (Note: quota withdrawn by ISU, not eligible as a reserve)
26	Vanessa Herzog (AUT)	37.851	Q
27	Wang Jingziqian (CHN)	37.863	PQ
28	Iori Kitahara (JPN)	37.901	
29	Brittany Bowe (USA)	37.906	Q
30	Julie Nistad Samsonsen (NOR)	37.967	Q
31	Jung Huidan (KOR)	37.987	R5
32	Karolina Bosiek (POL)	37.991	
33	Miho Takagi (JPN)	38.023	
34	Jenna Larter (CAN)	38.056	
35	Fran Vanhoutte (BEL)	38.065	R1
36	Anna Ostlender (GER)	38.095	R6
37	Sarah Warren (USA)	38.109	R7
38	Nikola Zdráhalová (CZE)	38.115	R2
39	Shi Xiaoxuan (CHN)	38.129	
40	Ellia Smeding (GBR)	38.143	R3
41	Maybritt Vigl (ITA)	38.191	R8
42	Maria Victoria Rodriguez (ARG)	38.394	R4
43	Chrysta Rands-Evans (USA)	38.411	
44	Rose Laliberté-Roy (CAN)	38.434	
45	Anna Kubo (JPN)	38.453	
46	Sofie Adeberg (GER)	38.495	R9
47	Isabel Grevelt (NED)	38.579	
48	Mckenzie Browne (USA)	38.633	
49	Ju-Lin de Visser (TPE)	38.734	
50	Mihaela Hogas (ROU)	38.766	
51	Giorgia Aiello (ITA)	38.793	
52	Luisa María González (ESP)	38.809	
53	Isabelle van Elst (BEL)	38.816	
54	Mathilde Pédronno (FRA)	38.872	
55	Kaitlyn McGregor (SUI)	38.985	
56	Hanna Biró (HUN)	38.999	
57	Laura Kivioja (FIN)	39.128	
58	Alena Lifatova (KAZ)	39.367	
59	Arina Ilyachsehenko (KAZ)	39.461	
60	Jasmin Güntert (SUI)	39.770	
61	Jéssica Carolina Santos Rodrigues (POR)	40.042	
62	Anne Sofie Knutsen Birkedal (NOR)	40.680	
63	Marte Bjerkreim Furnee (NOR)	41.234	
64	Suzanne Schulting (NED)	1:34.453	

=== Women's 1000m ===
The top 7 athletes not qualified through the point ranking, with a maximum of 3 per NOC, will earn a quota for their country. The top 8 unqualified athletes will form the reserve list, with athletes from unqualified countries having priority. Up to two additional starting positions will be made available during the games, given in reserve order. However, only skaters that already took part in another event will be eligible. After allocations were finalized three starting positions were made available during the games.

Pos.	Racer	Best Time	Note
1	Jutta Leerdam (NED)	1:12.352	PQ
2	Femke Kok (NED)	1:12.366	PQ
3	Béatrice Lamarche (CAN)	1:12.778	PQ
4	Marrit Fledderus (NED)	1:13.115	PQ
5	Isabel Grevelt (NED)	1:13.146	
6	Brittany Bowe (USA)	1:13.265	PQ
7	Rio Yamada (JPN)	1:13.299	PQ
8	Nadezhda Morozova (KAZ)	1:13.529	PQ
9	Miho Takagi (JPN)	1:13.605	PQ
10	Yukino Yoshida (JPN)	1:13.664	PQ
11	Erin Jackson (USA)	1:13.729	PQ
12	Antoinette Rijpma-de Jong (NED)	1:13.741	
13	Yin Qi (CHN)	1:13.813	PQ
14	Sofia Thorup (DEN)	1:13.867	PQ
15	Lee Na-hyun (KOR)	1:13.927	PQ
16	Kim Min-sun (KOR)	1:13.986	PQ
17	Elizaveta Golubeva (KAZ)	1:14.429	PQ
18	Han Mei (CHN)	1:14.487	PQ
19	Karolina Bosiek (POL)	1:14.512	PQ
20	Ellia Smeding (GBR)	1:14.540	PQ
21	Alexa Scott (CAN)	1:14.588	PQ
22	Kaitlyn McGregor (SUI)	1:14.663	Q
23	Vanessa Herzog (AUT)	1:14.701	Q
24	Nikola Zdráhalová (CZE)	1:14.705	PQ
25	Isabelle van Elst (BEL)	1:14.839	PQ
26	Anna Ostlender (GER)	1:14.898	Q
27	Tian Ruining (CHN)	1:15.032	Q
28	Natalia Czerwonka (POL)	1:15.061	Q
29	Maddison Pearman (CAN)	1:15.185	Q
30	Kristina Silaeva (KAZ)	1:15.192	R1
31	Lea Sophie Scholz (GER)	1:15.324	R2
32	Fran Vanhoutte (BEL)	1:15.449	R3
33	Jeannine Rosner (AUT)	1:15.452	R4
34	Sumire Kikuchi (JPN)	1:15.504	
35	Sarah Warren (USA)	1:15.694	R5
36	Anna Kubo (JPN)	1:15.767	
37	Brooklyn McDougall (CAN)	1:15.912	
38	Maybritt Vigl (ITA)	1:15.936	QH
39	Iga Wojtasik (POL)	1:16.007	R6
40	Mia Manganello (USA)	1:16.030	
41	Lim Lee-won (KOR)	1:16.047	R7
42	Serena Pergher (ITA)	1:16.075	R8
43	Natalia Jabrzyk (POL)	1:16.100	
44	Chen Ying-chu (TPE)	1:16.239	
45	Sofie Adeberg (GER)	1:16.436	
46	Julie Nistad Samsonsen (NOR)	1:16.444	
47	Chrysta Rands-Evans (USA)	1:16.682	
48	Hana Noake (JPN)	1:16.753	
49	Pei Chong (CHN)	1:16.766	
50	Arina Ilyachsehenko (KAZ)	1:16.799	
51	Rose Laliberté-Roy (CAN)	1:16.893	
52	Suzanne Schulting (NED)	1:16.945	
53	Meike Veen (NED)	1:17.160	
54	Mihaela Hogas (ROU)	1:17.207	
55	Jung Huidan (KOR)	1:17.647	
56	Vera Güntert (SUI)	1:17.696	
57	Alena Lifatova (KAZ)	1:17.909	
58	Laura Kivioja (FIN)	1:18.041	
59	Maria Victoria Rodriguez (ARG)	1:18.053	
60	Sara Cabrera (ESP)	1:18.317	
61	Mathilde Pédronno (FRA)	1:18.590	
62	Iori Kitahara (JPN)	1:18.715	
63	Jéssica Carolina Santos Rodrigues (POR)	1:18.828	
64	Marte Bjerkreim Furnee (NOR)	1:19.047	
65	Abigél Mercs (HUN)	1:19.052	
66	Ju-Lin de Visser (TPE)	1:19.761	
67	Veronika Antošová (CZE)	1:20.056	
68	Ramona Härdi (SUI)	1:21.385	
69	Anne Sofie Knutsen Birkedal (NOR)	1:23.434	

=== Women's 1500m ===
The top 7 athletes not qualified through the point ranking, with a maximum of 3 per NOC, will earn a quota for their country. The top 8 unqualified athletes will form the reserve list, with athletes from unqualified countries having priority. Up to two additional starting positions will be made available during the games, given in reserve order. However, only skaters that already took part in another event will be eligible. After allocations were finalized only 6 quotas were given making three starting positions available during the games.

Pos.	Racer	Best Time	Note
1	Joy Beune (NED)	1:51.051	PQ
2	Nadezhda Morozova (KAZ)	1:51.659	PQ
3	Miho Takagi (JPN)	1:51.684	PQ
4	Antoinette Rijpma-de Jong (NED)	1:51.711	PQ
5	Brittany Bowe (USA)	1:51.843	PQ
6	Ragne Wiklund (NOR)	1:51.963	PQ
7	Melissa Wijfje (NED)	1:52.280	PQ
8	Kaitlyn McGregor (SUI)	1:52.314	PQ
9	Valérie Maltais (CAN)	1:52.561	PQ
10	Han Mei (CHN)	1:52.694	PQ
11	Nikola Zdráhalová (CZE)	1:52.862	PQ
12	Elizaveta Golubeva (KAZ)	1:53.001	PQ
13	Angel Daleman (NED)	1:53.086	
14	Marijke Groenewoud (NED)	1:53.194	
15	Li Jiaxuan (CHN)	1:53.268	
16	Yang Binyu (CHN)	1:53.349	PQ
17	Ivanie Blondin (CAN)	1:53.436	PQ
18	Ayano Sato (JPN)	1:53.494	PQ
19	Jeannine Rosner (AUT)	1:53.602	Q
20	Yin Qi (CHN)	1:53.627	PQ
21	Ahenaer Adake (CHN)	1:53.777	
22	Francesca Lollobrigida (ITA)	1:53.897	PQ
23	Lea Sophie Scholz (GER)	1:53.949	Q
24	Natalia Czerwonka (POL)	1:53.952	PQ
25	Isabelle van Elst (BEL)	1:54.007	PQ
26	Park Ji-woo (KOR)	1:54.095	Q
27	Martina Sáblíková (CZE)	1:54.356	Q
28	Sofia Thorup (DEN)	1:54.530	Q (Note: Quota was withdrawn by ISU)
29	Béatrice Lamarche (CAN)	1:54.557	
30	Rio Yamada (JPN)	1:54.695	Q
31	Greta Myers (USA)	1:54.975	PQ
32	Momoka Horikawa (JPN)	1:55.052	
33	Isabelle Weidemann (CAN)	1:55.071	PQ
34	Ellia Smeding (GBR)	1:55.326	Q
35	Aurora Grinden Løvås (NOR)	1:55.521	R2
36	Vanessa Herzog (AUT)	1:55.560	R3
37	Kang Soo-min (KOR)	1:55.690	R4
38	Lim Lee-won (KOR)	1:55.731	R5
39	Alexa Scott (CAN)	1:55.809	
40	Sandrine Tas (BEL)	1:56.121	R6
41	Natalia Jabrzyk (POL)	1:56.201	R7
42	Arina Ilyachsehenko (KAZ)	1:56.361	R8
43	Alexandra Sayutina (AIN)	1:56.404	R1
44	Zofia Braun (POL)	1:56.613	
45	Linda Rossi (ITA)	1:56.622	
46	Isabel Kraus (GER)	1:57.020	
47	Violette Braun (FRA)	1:57.043	
48	Kyoko Nitta (JPN)	1:57.245	
49	Ramona Härdi (SUI)	1:57.345	
50	Meike Veen (NED)	1:57.551	
51	Marlen Ehseluns (GER)	1:57.661	
52	Emily Tormen (ITA)	1:57.683	
53	Giorgia Birkeland (USA)	1:57.892	
54	Hana Noake (JPN)	1:59.209	
55	Sofie Adeberg (GER)	1:59.245	
56	Sarah Warren (USA)	1:59.793	
57	Lucie Korvasová (CZE)	1:59.861	
58	Arianna Fontana (ITA)	1:59.931	
59	Anna Kubo (JPN)	2:00.090	
60	Ju-Lin de Visser (TPE)	2:00.155	
61	Mia Manganello (USA)	2:00.550	
62	Sumire Kikuchi (JPN)	2:00.760	
63	Abigél Mercs (HUN)	2:00.825	
64	Chrysta Rands-Evans (USA)	2:00.867	
65	Marte Bjerkreim Furnee (NOR)	2:01.556	
66	Natascha Lindenskov (DEN)	2:01.641	
67	Anna Molnar (AUT)	2:01.665	
68	Maira Jasch (GER)	2:01.693	
69	Zuzana Kuršová (CZE)	2:06.682	

=== Women's 3000m ===
The top 5 athletes not qualified through the point ranking, with a maximum of 3 per NOC, will earn a quota for their country. The top 8 unqualified athletes will form the reserve list, with athletes from unqualified countries having priority.

Pos.	Racer	Best Time	Note
1	Joy Beune (NED)	3:53.698	PQ
2	Ragne Wiklund (NOR)	3:55.256	PQ
3	Valérie Maltais (CAN)	3:56.458	PQ
4	Isabelle Weidemann (CAN)	3:56.665	PQ
5	Francesca Lollobrigida (ITA)	3:57.651	PQ
6	Josie Hofmann (GER)	3:57.713	PQ
7	Sanne in 't Hof (NED)	3:57.784	
8	Nadezhda Morozova (KAZ)	3:58.030	PQ
9	Jeannine Rosner (AUT)	3:58.420	Q
10	Martina Sáblíková (CZE)	3:58.493	PQ
11	Kaitlyn McGregor (SUI)	3:59.264	Q
12	Bente Kerkhoff (NED)	3:59.378	PQ
13	Sandrine Tas (BEL)	3:59.420	PQ
14	Ivanie Blondin (CAN)	3:59.481	PQ
15	Violette Braun (FRA)	3:59.794	Q
16	Maryna Zuyeva (AIN)	3:59.884	PQ
17	Kseniia Korzhova (AIN)	3:59.951	Q
18	Elizaveta Golubeva (KAZ)	4:00.119	Q
19	Yang Binyu (CHN)	4:00.372	R2
20	Momoka Horikawa (JPN)	4:00.679	PQ
21	Greta Myers (USA)	4:00.705	R1
22	Maira Jasch (GER)	4:00.814	R3
23	Li Jiaxuan (CHN)	4:00.927	R4
24	Marijke Groenewoud (NED)	4:00.952	PQ
25	Tai Zhien (CHN)	4:00.990	PQ
26	Miho Takagi (JPN)	4:00.994	R5
27	Linda Rossi (ITA)	4:00.997	R6
28	Nikola Zdráhalová (CZE)	4:01.002	R7
29	Han Mei (CHN)	4:01.114	
30	Ayano Sato (JPN)	4:01.667	R8
31	Josephine Schlörb (GER)	4:01.756	
32	Aurora Grinden Løvås (NOR)	4:01.915	
33	Park Ji-woo (KOR)	4:02.100	
34	Zofia Braun (POL)	4:02.193	
35	Ahenaer Adake (CHN)	4:02.726	
36	Laura Hall (CAN)	4:02.978	
37	Elisa Dul (NED)	4:03.613	
38	Magdalena Czyszczoń (POL)	4:03.652	
39	Hana Noake (JPN)	4:04.536	
40	Giorgia Birkeland (USA)	4:04.594	
41	Julia Nizan (FRA)	4:04.714	
42	Marlen Ehseluns (GER)	4:05.435	
43	Ramona Härdi (SUI)	4:06.006	
44	Abigail Mccluskey (CAN)	4:06.290	
45	Melissa Wijfje (NED)	4:06.677	
46	Mia Manganello (USA)	4:07.676	
47	Anna Molnar (AUT)	4:08.047	
48	Akane Iida (JPN)	4:08.061	
49	Alice Marletti (ITA)	4:09.195	
50	Kyoko Nitta (JPN)	4:09.329	
51	Arina Ilyachsehenko (KAZ)	4:10.231	
52	Lucie Korvasová (CZE)	4:11.029	
53	Natascha Lindenskov (DEN)	4:12.264	
54	Marte Bjerkreim Furnee (NOR)	4:12.528	
55	Gemma Cooper (GBR)	4:13.275	
56	Nadja Wenger (SUI)	4:13.410	
57	Zuzana Kuršová (CZE)	4:15.442	
58	Hou Jundan (CHN)	4:17.198	
59	Dina Storelid (NOR)	4:17.198	
60	Laura Lorenzato (ITA)	4:18.227	
61	Abigél Mercs (HUN)	4:19.674	
62	Marley Soldan (USA)	4:20.033	
63	Ingrid Håkegård Eichler (NOR)	4:21.144	
64	Piper Yde (USA)	4:22.405	

=== Women's 5000m ===
The top 3 athletes not qualified through the point ranking, with a maximum of 3 per NOC, will earn a quota for their country. The top 8 unqualified athletes will form the reserve list, with athletes from unqualified countries having priority.

Pos.	Racer	Best Time	Note
1	Sanne in 't Hof (NED)	6:47.658	
2	Ragne Wiklund (NOR)	6:49.016	PQ
3	Isabelle Weidemann (CAN)	6:50.110	PQ
4	Marijke Groenewoud (NED)	6:50.248	PQ
5	Joy Beune (NED)	6:51.834	PQ
6	Sandrine Tas (BEL)	6:52.243	PQ
7	Maira Jasch (GER)	6:53.148	Q
8	Merel Conijn (NED)	6:53.311	
9	Maryna Zuyeva (AIN)	6:53.466	Q
10	Yang Binyu (CHN)	6:54.130	Q
11	Martina Sáblíková (CZE)	6:55.960	PQ
12	Francesca Lollobrigida (ITA)	6:56.807	PQ
13	Violette Braun (FRA)	6:57.064	R1
14	Bente Kerkhoff (NED)	6:57.171	
15	Linda Rossi (ITA)	6:58.150	R5
16	Tai Zhien (CHN)	6:59.876	R6
17	Greta Myers (USA)	6:59.926	R2
18	Josie Hofmann (GER)	7:00.642	R7
19	Laura Lorenzato (ITA)	7:01.384	
20	Ivanie Blondin (CAN)	7:01.768	
21	Nadezhda Morozova (KAZ)	7:02.793	PQ
22	Laura Hall (CAN)	7:05.480	
23	Giorgia Birkeland (USA)	7:06.055	R8
24	Ahenaer Adake (CHN)	7:06.429	
25	Jeannine Rosner (AUT)	7:06.638	R3
26	Valérie Maltais (CAN)	7:06.691	PQ
27	Momoka Horikawa (JPN)	7:07.725	R4
28	Park Ji-woo (KOR)	7:07.854	
29	Zofia Braun (POL)	7:09.633	
30	Kyoko Nitta (JPN)	7:10.006	
31	Josephine Schlörb (GER)	7:10.773	
32	Magdalena Czyszczoń (POL)	7:10.925	
33	Hana Noake (JPN)	7:13.815	
34	Ingrid Håkegård Eichler (NOR)	7:13.883	
35	Lucie Korvasová (CZE)	7:16.488	
36	Ramona Härdi (SUI)	7:16.604	
37	Julia Nizan (FRA)	7:16.709	
38	Laurie Cayer (CAN)	7:17.196	
39	Jin Wenjing (CHN)	7:17.329	
40	Marte Bjerkreim Furnee (NOR)	7:17.543	
41	Anna Molnar (AUT)	7:20.549	
42	Marlen Ehseluns (GER)	7:22.689	
43	Natascha Lindenskov (DEN)	7:24.107	
44	Anastasiia Grigoreva (AIN)	7:25.849	
45	Nadja Wenger (SUI)	7:26.205	
46	Zuzana Kuršová (CZE)	7:27.742	
47	Gemma Cooper (GBR)	7:36.824	
48	Li Jiaxuan (CHN)	no time	

=== Women's Team Pursuit ===
The top 2 countries not qualified through the point ranking will earn a quota. The top 4 unqualified countries will form the reserve list.

Pos.	Racer	Best Time	Note
1	Japan	2:52.131	PQ
2	Canada	2:52.400	PQ
3	Netherlands	2:52.528	PQ
4	United States	2:53.584	PQ
5	Germany	2:54.386	PQ
6	China	2:56.239	PQ
7	Kazakhstan	2:57.711	Q
8	Belgium	2:58.389	Q
9	Poland	2:58.415	R1
10	Czech Republic	2:58.859	R2
11	Switzerland	2:58.989	R3
12	Norway	3:00.919	R4
13	South Korea	3:01.097	
14	Italy	3:02.906	
