= 2025–26 ISU Speed Skating World Cup – World Cup 1 =

Ice skating competition in Utah, US

2025–26 ISU Speed Skating World Cup 1
- Venue: Utah Olympic Oval; Salt Lake City; United States
- Dates: 14 — 16 November 2025

The first competition weekend of the 2025–26 ISU Speed Skating World Cup was held at the Utah Olympic Oval in Salt Lake City, USA, from Friday, 14 November, to Sunday, 16 November 2025. It is the first of four events that determine qualification for speed skating at the 2026 Winter Olympics.

== Medal summary ==
=== Men's events ===
Event	Gold	Time	Silver	Time	Bronze	Time	Report
500 m (1)	Jordan Stolz; United States	33.88	Damian Żurek; Poland	33.90; PB	Gao Tingyu; China	33.93	
500 m (2)	Jenning de Boo; Netherlands	33.63; PB	Yevgeniy Koshkin; Kazakhstan	33.67; PB	Kim Jun-ho; South Korea	33.78; PB	
1000 m	Jordan Stolz; United States	1:05.66	Damian Żurek; Poland	1:06.02; PB	Jenning de Boo; Netherlands	1:06.34	
1500 m	Jordan Stolz; United States	1:40.48; PB	Ning Zhongyan; China	1:41.02; PB	Finn Sonnekalb; Germany	1:41.33; JWR; PB	
5000 m	Timothy Loubineaud; France	6:00.23; WR; TR; PB	Metoděj Jílek; Czech Republic	6:02.78; PB	Sander Eitrem; Norway	6:03.38; PB	
Mass start^{A}	Jorrit Bergsma; Netherlands	63	Felix Maly; Germany	40	Antoine Gélinas-Beaulieu; Canada	21	
Team pursuit	United States; Casey Dawson; Emery Lehman; Ethan Cepuran	3:32.49; WR; TR	Norway; Sander Eitrem; Peder Kongshaug; Didrik Eng Strand	3:35.20	China; Liu Hanbin; Wu Yu; Ning Zhongyan	3:36.65	

^{A} In mass start, race points are accumulated during the race based on results of the intermediate sprints and the final sprint. The skater with most race points is the winner.

=== Women's events ===
Event	Gold	Time	Silver	Time	Bronze	Time	Report
500 m (1)	Femke Kok; Netherlands	36.48; PB	Erin Jackson; United States	36.87	Yukino Yoshida; Japan	36.88; PB	
500 m (2)	Femke Kok; Netherlands	36.09; WR; TR; PB	Erin Jackson; United States	36.57; PB	Lee Na-hyun; South Korea	37.03; PB	
1000 m	Jutta Leerdam; Netherlands	1:12.35	Femke Kok; Netherlands	1:12.43; PB	Béatrice Lamarche; Canada	1:12.77; PB	
1500 m	Joy Beune; Netherlands	1:51.05; PB	Antoinette Rijpma-de Jong; Netherlands	1:51.71; PB	Ragne Wiklund; Norway	1:51.96; PB	
3000 m	Joy Beune; Netherlands	3:53.69; PB	Valerie Maltais; Canada	3:56.53; PB	Ragne Wiklund; Norway	3:57.19	
Mass start^{A}	Mia Manganello; United States	60	Valerie Maltais; Canada	45	Bente Kerkhoff; Netherlands	27	
Team pursuit	Japan; Miho Takagi; Ayano Sato; Hana Noake	2:52.13	Canada; Valerie Maltais; Ivanie Blondin; Isabelle Weidemann	2:52.40	United States; Brittany Bowe; Mia Manganello; Greta Myers	2:54.01	

^{A} In mass start, race points are accumulated during the race based on results of the intermediate sprints and the final sprint. The skater with most race points is the winner.

== Medal count ==
* Host nation (United States)

Rank	Nation	Gold	Silver	Bronze	Total
1	Netherlands	7	2	2	11
2	United States*	5	2	1	8
3	Japan	1	0	1	2
4	France	1	0	0	1
5	Canada	0	3	2	5
6	Poland	0	2	0	2
7	Norway	0	1	3	4
8	China	0	1	2	3
9	Germany	0	1	1	2
10	Czech Republic	0	1	0	1
10	Kazakhstan	0	1	0	1
12	South Korea	0	0	2	2
Totals (12 entries)		14	14	14	42

== Results ==
=== Men's events ===
==== 1st 500 m ====
The race started on 15 November 2025 at 12:58.

Rank	Pair	Lane	Name	Country	Time	Diff	WC Points
1st place, gold medalist(s)	6	o	Jordan Stolz	United States	33.88		60
2nd place, silver medalist(s)	6	i	Damian Żurek	Poland	33.90; PB	+0.02	54
3rd place, bronze medalist(s)	3	o	Gao Tingyu	China	33.93	+0.05	48
4	5	i	Wataru Morishige	Japan	33.94; PB	+0.06	43
5	9	i	Bjørn Magnussen	Norway	33.99; PB	+0.11	40
6	2	i	Koo Kyung-min	South Korea	34.06; PB	+0.18	38
7	9	o	Cooper McLeod	United States	34.07; PB	+0.19	36
8	4	i	Laurent Dubreuil	Canada	34.09	+0.21	34
9	3	i	Marten Liiv	Estonia	34.12; PB	+0.24	32
10	8	o	Jenning de Boo	Netherlands	34.23	+0.35	31
11	2	o	Yuta Hirose	Japan	34.24; PB	+0.36	30
12	4	o	Joep Wennemars	Netherlands	34.33; PB	+0.45	29
13	7	i	Cedrick Brunet	Canada	34.37	+0.49	28
14	1	i	Tatsuya Shinhama	Japan	34.37	+0.49	27
15	10	o	Marek Kania	Poland	34.38	+0.50	26
16	10	i	Yevgeniy Koshkin	Kazakhstan	34.43	+0.55	25
17	1	o	Piotr Michalski	Poland	34.46	+0.58	24
18	8	i	Sebas Diniz	Netherlands	34.66	+0.78	23
19	7	o	Zach Stoppelmoor	United States	54.88	+21.00	22
20	5	o	Stefan Westenbroek	Netherlands	1:28.69	+54.81	21

==== 2nd 500 m ====
The race started on 16 November 2025 at 14:34.

Rank	Pair	Lane	Name	Country	Time	Diff	WC Points
1st place, gold medalist(s)	6	o	Jenning de Boo	Netherlands	33.63; PB		60
2nd place, silver medalist(s)	2	i	Yevgeniy Koshkin	Kazakhstan	33.67; PB	+0.04	54
3rd place, bronze medalist(s)	2	o	Kim Jun-ho	South Korea	33.78; PB	+0.15	48
4	9	i	Jordan Stolz	United States	33.79	+0.16	43
5	4	i	Xue Zhiwen	China	33.87; PB	+0.22	40
6	8	o	Damian Żurek	Poland	33.93	+0.30	38
7	8	i	Wataru Morishige	Japan	33.94; PB	+0.31	36
8	3	o	Marek Kania	Poland	34.01; PB	+0.38	34
9	9	o	Bjørn Magnussen	Norway	34.04	+0.41	32
10	7	i	Cooper McLeod	United States	34.04; PB	+0.41	31
11	7	o	Laurent Dubreuil	Canada	34.05	+0.42	30
12	4	o	Cedrick Brunet	Canada	34.06; PB	+0.42	29
13	1	o	Lian Ziwen	China	34.13; PB	+0.50	28
14	10	o	Gao Tingyu	China	34.23	+0.60	27
15	3	i	Tatsuya Shinhama	Japan	34.30	+0.67	26
16	5	o	Joep Wennemars	Netherlands	34.35	+0.72	25
17	6	i	Marten Liiv	Estonia	34.39	+0.76	24
18	1	i	Piotr Michalski	Poland	34.54	+0.91	23
19	5	i	Yuta Hirose	Japan	1:01.17	+27.54	22
20	10	i	Koo Kyung-min	South Korea	1:24.78	+51.15	21

==== 1000 m ====
The race started on 14 November 2025 at 20:47.

Rank	Pair	Lane	Name	Country	Time	Diff	WC Points
1st place, gold medalist(s)	8	i	Jordan Stolz	United States	1:05.66		60
2nd place, silver medalist(s)	4	i	Damian Żurek	Poland	1:06.02; PB	+0.36	54
3rd place, bronze medalist(s)	9	i	Jenning de Boo	Netherlands	1:06.34	+0.68	48
4	7	i	Ning Zhongyan	China	1:06.47; PB	+0.81	43
5	5	o	Finn Sonnekalb	Germany	1:06.48; PB	+0.82	40
6	10	o	Tim Prins	Netherlands	1:06.64	+0.98	38
7	3	i	Marten Liiv	Estonia	1:06.73; PB	+1.07	36
8	3	o	Ryota Kojima	Japan	1:07.00; PB	+1.34	34
9	8	o	Joep Wennemars	Netherlands	1:07.01; PB	+1.35	32
9	10	i	Cooper Mcleod	United States	1:07.01; PB	+1.35	32
11	7	o	Conor McDermott-Mostowy	United States	1:07.02	+1.36	30
12	4	o	Marek Kania	Poland	1:07.30; PB	+1.64	29
13	5	i	Taiyo Nonomura	Japan	1:07.32	+1.66	28
14	2	o	Laurent Dubreuil	Canada	1:07.75	+2.09	27
15	1	i	Moritz Klein	Germany	1:07.76	+2.10	26
16	1	o	Mathias Vosté	Belgium	1:07.76	+2.10	25
17	6	o	Kim Min-seok	Hungary	1:07.85	+2.19	24
18	9	o	Connor Howe	Canada	1:09.66	+4.00	23
	6	i	Kjeld Nuis	Netherlands	DQ		0
	2	i	Kazuya Yamada	Japan	DQ		0

==== 1500 m ====
The race started on 15 November 2025 at 14:17.

Rank	Pair	Lane	Name	Country	Time	Diff	WC Points
1st place, gold medalist(s)	9	o	Jordan Stolz	United States	1:40.48; PB		60
2nd place, silver medalist(s)	5	o	Ning Zhongyan	China	1:41.02; PB	+0.54	54
3rd place, bronze medalist(s)	6	o	Finn Sonnekalb	Germany	1:41.33; JWR; PB	+0.85	48
4	3	o	Peder Kongshaug	Norway	1:41.34; PB	+0.86	43
5	9	i	Kjeld Nuis	Netherlands	1:41.37	+0.89	40
6	4	o	Kazuya Yamada	Japan	1:42.25; PB	+1.77	38
7	10	o	Joep Wennemars	Netherlands	1:42.34; PB	+1.86	36
8	10	i	Tim Prins	Netherlands	1:42.36; PB	+1.88	34
9	8	i	Kim Min-seok	Hungary	1:42.67	+2.19	32
10	4	i	Daniele Di Stefano	Italy	1:42.74; PB	+2.26	31
11	2	o	Didrik Eng Strand	Norway	1:42.92; PB	+2.44	30
12	1	i	Taiyo Nonomura	Japan	1:42.93; PB	+2.45	29
13	7	o	David La Rue	Canada	1:42.93; PB	+2.45	29
14	7	i	Wesly Dijs	Netherlands	1:43.10	+2.62	27
15	6	i	Tijmen Snel	Netherlands	1:43.14; PB	+2.66	26
16	3	i	Sander Eitrem	Norway	1:43.35	+2.87	25
17	2	i	Motonaga Arito	Japan	1:43.68; PB	+3.20	24
18	1	o	Mathias Vosté	Belgium	1:43.82	+3.34	23
19	5	i	Kotaro Kasahara	Japan	1:44.26; PB	+3.78	22
20	8	o	Connor Howe	Canada	1:45.71	+5.23	21

==== 5000 m ====
The race started on 14 November 2025 at 18:56.

Rank	Pair	Lane	Name	Country	Time	Diff	WC Points
1st place, gold medalist(s)	5	o	Timothy Loubineaud	France	6:00.23; WR; TR; PB		60
2nd place, silver medalist(s)	3	i	Metoděj Jílek	Czech Republic	6:02.78; PB	+2.55	54
3rd place, bronze medalist(s)	6	o	Sander Eitrem	Norway	6:03.38; PB	+3.15	48
4	7	i	Casey Dawson	United States	6:04.40; PB	+4.17	43
5	6	i	Chris Huizinga	Netherlands	6:07.32	+7.09	40
6	8	o	Davide Ghiotto	Italy	6:07.64	+7.41	38
7	7	o	Ted-Jan Bloemen	Canada	6:09.99	+9.76	36
8	5	i	Jorrit Bergsma	Netherlands	6:10.66	+10.43	34
9	4	i	Michele Malfatti	Italy	6:11.82	+11.59	32
10	1	i	Fridtjof Petzold	Germany	6:12.06	+11.83	31
11	2	o	Felix Maly	Germany	6:12.17; PB	+11.94	30
12	2	i	Sigurd Henriksen	Norway	6:12.52; PB	+12.29	29
13	1	o	Bart Swings	Belgium	6:12.74	+12.51	28
14	8	i	Marcel Bosker	Netherlands	6:15.48	+15.25	27
15	4	o	Andrea Giovannini	Italy	6:21.62	+21.39	26
16	3	o	Daniel Hall	Canada	6:25.30	+25.07	25

==== Mass start ====
The race started on 16 November 2025 at 15:38.

Rank	Name	Country	Points	Time	WC Points
1st place, gold medalist(s)	Jorrit Bergsma	Netherlands	63	7:39.20	60
2nd place, silver medalist(s)	Felix Maly	Germany	40	7:40.17	54
3rd place, bronze medalist(s)	Antoine Gélinas-Beaulieu	Canada	21	7:40.31	48
4	Jake Weidemann	Canada	12	7:40.35	43
5	Livio Wenger	Switzerland	7	7:40.44	40
6	Fridtjof Petzold	Germany	5	7:40.57	38
7	Viktor Hald Thorup	Denmark	3	7:58.96	36
8	Gabriel Odor	Austria	3	8:10.55	34
9	Daniele Di Stefano	Italy	2	7:52.18	32
10	Bart Swings	Belgium	1	7:46.50	31
11	Chung Jae-won	South Korea		7:46.04	30
12	Cho Seung-min	South Korea		7:46.18	29
13	Bart Hoolwerf	Netherlands		7:46.25	28
14	Andrea Giovannini	Italy		7:46.36	27
15	Jordan Stolz	United States		7:46.40	26
16	Metoděj Jílek	Czech Republic		7:46.43	25
17	Shomu Sasaki	Japan		7:46.63	24
18	Timothy Loubineaud	France		7:46.65	23
19	Zhou Zihan	China		7:46.91	22
20	Indra Medard	Belgium		7:46.94	21
21	Mathieu Belloir	France		7:47.01	20
22	Peter Michael	New Zealand		7:48.80	19
23	Philip Due Schmidt	Denmark		7:50.99	18
24	Didrik Eng Strand	Norway		8:05.72	17

==== Team pursuit ====
The race started on 16 November 2025 at 13:28.

Rank	Pair	Lane	Country	Time	Diff	WC Points
1st place, gold medalist(s)	4	s	United States; Casey Dawson; Emery Lehman; Ethan Cepuran	3:32.49; WR; TR		
2nd place, silver medalist(s)	3	s	Norway; Sander Eitrem; Peder Kongshaug; Didrik Eng Strand	3:35.20	+2.17	
3rd place, bronze medalist(s)	2	c	China; Liu Hanbin; Wu Yu; Ning Zhongyan	3:36.65	+4.16	
4	1	c	France; Timothy Loubineaud; Valentin Thiebault; Germain Deschamps	3:37.97	+5.48	
5	2	s	Japan; Shomu Sasaki; Kazuya Yamada; Motonaga Arito	3:38.90	+6.41	
6	3	c	Netherlands; Chris Huizinga; Beau Snellink; Tjerk de Boer	3.40.03	+7.54	
7	1	s	Belgium; Bart Swings; Indra Medard; Mathias Vosté	3:48.41	+15.90	
8	4	c	Italy; Davide Ghiotto; Michele Malfatti; Andrea Giovannini	4:39.70	+1:07.21	

=== Women's events ===
==== 1st 500 m ====
The race started on 15 November 2025 at 12:30.

Rank	Pair	Lane	Name	Country	Time	Diff	WC Points
1st place, gold medalist(s)	9	i	Femke Kok	Netherlands	36.48; PB		60
2nd place, silver medalist(s)	10	o	Erin Jackson	United States	36.87	+0.39	54
3rd place, bronze medalist(s)	7	i	Yukino Yoshida	Japan	36.88; PB	+0.40	48
4	9	o	Kaja Ziomek-Nogal	Poland	37.17	+0.69	43
5	4	i	Jutta Leerdam	Netherlands	37.18	+0.70	40
6	8	o	Marrit Fledderus	Netherlands	37.20; PB	+0.72	38
7	8	i	Anna Boersma	Netherlands	37.27; PB	+0.79	36
8	3	i	Serena Pergher	Italy	37.29; PB	+0.81	34
9	4	o	Béatrice Lamarche	Canada	37.30; PB	+0.82	32
10	6	o	Andżelika Wójcik	Poland	37.34	+0.86	31
11	2	i	Lee Na-hyun	South Korea	37.34; PB	+0.86	30
12	6	i	Tian Ruining	China	37.41	+0.93	29
13	5	o	Angel Daleman	Netherlands	37.42; PB	+0.94	28
14	5	i	Sophie Warmuth	Germany	37.43; PB	+0.95	27
15	7	o	Martyna Baran	Poland	37.44; PB	+0.96	26
16	10	i	Kristina Silaeva	Kazakhstan	37.49	+1.01	25
17	1	o	Kim Min-sun	South Korea	37.58	+1.10	24
18	1	i	Kurumi Inagawa	Japan	37.92	+1.44	23
19	3	o	Vanessa Herzog	Austria	37.94	+1.46	22
20	2	o	Chrysta Rands-Evans	United States	38.44	+1.96	21

==== 2nd 500 m ====
The race started on 16 November 2025 at 14:07.

Rank	Pair	Lane	Name	Country	Time	Diff	WC Points
1st place, gold medalist(s)	10	i	Femke Kok	Netherlands	36.09; WR; TR; PB		60
2nd place, silver medalist(s)	10	o	Erin Jackson	United States	36.57; PB	+0.48	54
3rd place, bronze medalist(s)	5	i	Lee Na-hyun	South Korea	37.03; PB	+0.94	48
4	9	o	Yukino Yoshida	Japan	37.06	+0.97	43
5	7	i	Anna Boersma	Netherlands	37.11; PB	+1.02	40
6	9	i	Marrit Fledderus	Netherlands	37.11; PB	+1.02	38
7	3	o	Martyna Baran	Poland	37.26; PB	+1.17	36
8	6	o	Andżelika Wójcik	Poland	37.32	+1.23	34
9	6	i	Béatrice Lamarche	Canada	37.33	+1.24	32
10	8	i	Jutta Leerdam	Netherlands	37.36	+1.26	31
11	2	i	Kristina Silaeva	Kazakhstan	37.36	+1.27	30
12	4	o	Chen Ying-chu	Chinese Taipei	37.40; PB	+1.31	29
13	4	i	Angel Daleman	Netherlands	37.41; PB	+1.32	28
14	3	i	Sophie Warmuth	Germany	37.42; PB	+1.33	27
15	5	o	Tian Ruining	China	37.43	+1.34	26
16	7	o	Serena Pergher	Italy	37.45	+1.36	25
17	2	o	Kim Min-sun	South Korea	37.46	+1.37	24
18	8	o	Kaja Ziomek-Nogal	Poland	37.54	+1.45	23
19	1	i	Pei Chong	China	37.84	+1.75	22
20	1	o	Iori Kitahara	Japan	38.11	+2.02	21

==== 1000 m ====
The race started on 14 November 2025 at 20:14.

Rank	Pair	Lane	Name	Country	Time	Diff	WC Points
1st place, gold medalist(s)	8	i	Jutta Leerdam	Netherlands	1:12.35		60
2nd place, silver medalist(s)	8	o	Femke Kok	Netherlands	1:12.43; PB	+0.08	54
3rd place, bronze medalist(s)	7	i	Béatrice Lamarche	Canada	1:12.77; PB	+0.42	48
4	10	i	Marrit Fledderus	Netherlands	1:13.11; PB	+0.76	43
5	7	o	Brittany Bowe	United States	1:13.26	+0.91	40
6	6	o	Rio Yamada	Japan	1:13.29; PB	+0.94	38
7	3	o	Nadezhda Morozova	Kazakhstan	1:13.52; PB	+1.17	36
8	5	i	Erin Jackson	United States	1:13.72; PB	+1.37	34
9	9	i	Antoinette Rijpma-de Jong	Netherlands	1:13.75	+1.40	32
10	10	o	Isabel Grevelt	Netherlands	1:13.86	+1.51	31
11	1	i	Lee Na-hyun	South Korea	1:13.92; PB	+1.57	30
12	9	o	Yin Qi	China	1:14.12	+1.77	29
13	6	i	Karolina Bosiek	Poland	1:14.51; PB	+2.16	28
14	5	o	Yukino Yoshida	Japan	1:14.56; PB	+2.21	27
15	1	o	Isabelle van Elst	Belgium	1:14.83	+2.48	26
16	4	i	Natalia Czerwonka	Poland	1:15.24	+2.89	25
17	4	o	Lea Sophie Scholz	Germany	1:15.38	+3.03	24
18	3	i	Sumire Kikuchi	Japan	1:15.50	+3.15	23
19	2	o	Iga Wojtasik	Poland	1:16.04; PB	+3.69	22
20	2	i	Anna Kubo	Japan	1:16.70; PB	+4.35	21

==== 1500 m ====
The race started on 15 November 2025 at 13:40.

Rank	Pair	Lane	Name	Country	Time	Diff	WC Points
1st place, gold medalist(s)	8	o	Joy Beune	Netherlands	1:51.05; PB		60
2nd place, silver medalist(s)	8	i	Antoinette Rijpma-de Jong	Netherlands	1:51.71; PB	+0.66	54
3rd place, bronze medalist(s)	6	o	Ragne Wiklund	Norway	1:51.96; PB	+0.91	48
4	10	o	Melissa Wijfje	Netherlands	1:52.28	+1.23	43
5	5	o	Miho Takagi	Japan	1:52.45	+1.40	40
6	9	o	Brittany Bowe	United States	1:52.46	+1.41	38
7	7	o	Angel Daleman	Netherlands	1:53.08	+2.03	36
8	4	o	Nikola Zdráhalová	Czech Republic	1:53.12; PB	+2.07	34
9	5	i	Li Jiaxuan	China	1:53.26; PB	+2.21	32
10	4	i	Ayano Sato	Japan	1:53.49	+2.44	31
11	10	i	Ivanie Blondin	Canada	1:53.56	+2.51	30
12	1	o	Han Mei	China	1:53.89	+2.84	29
13	3	o	Francesca Lollobrigida	Italy	1:53.89	+2.84	28
14	2	o	Isabelle van Elst	Belgium	1:54.22; PB	+3.17	27
15	3	i	Martina Sáblíková	Czech Republic	1:54.35	+3.30	26
16	6	i	Béatrice Lamarche	Canada	1:54.55; PB	+3.50	25
17	7	i	Greta Myers	United States	1:54.97; PB	+3.92	24
18	2	i	Momoka Horikawa	Japan	1:55.05; PB	+4.00	23
19	9	i	Marijke Groenewoud	Netherlands	1:55.29	+4.24	22
20	1	i	Zofia Braun	Poland	1:57.66; PB	+6.61	21

==== 3000 m ====
The race started on 14 November 2025 at 18:00.

Rank	Pair	Lane	Name	Country	Time	Diff	WC Points
1st place, gold medalist(s)	7	o	Joy Beune	Netherlands	3:53.69 PB		60
2nd place, silver medalist(s)	8	o	Valerie Maltais	Canada	3:56.53; PB	+2.84	54
3rd place, bronze medalist(s)	8	i	Ragne Wiklund	Norway	3:57.19	+3.50	48
4	5	i	Francesca Lollobrigida	Italy	3:57.65	+3.96	43
5	6	i	Isabelle Weidemann	Canada	3:57.84	+4.15	40
6	3	i	Martina Sáblíková	Czech Republic	3:58.49	+4.80	38
7	6	o	Bente Kerkhoff	Netherlands	3:59.37	+5.68	36
8	5	o	Ivanie Blondin	Canada	3:59.48	+5.79	34
9	2	i	Sandrine Tas	Belgium	4:00.15; PB	+6.46	32
10	3	o	Momoka Horikawa	Japan	4:00.67	+6.98	31
11	1	o	Tai Zhien	China	4:01.15; PB	+7.46	30
12	7	i	Marijke Groenewoud	Netherlands	4:01.56	+7.87	29
13	4	o	Laura Hall	Canada	4:02.97	+9.28	28
14	4	i	Elisa Dul	Netherlands	4:03.61	+9.92	27
15	2	o	Josephine Schlörb	Germany	4:04.55; PB	+10.86	26
16	1	i	Yang Binyu	China	4:05.28	+11.59	25

==== Mass start ====
The race started on 16 November 2025 at 15:17.

Rank	Name	Country	Points	Time	WC Points
1st place, gold medalist(s)	Mia Manganello	United States	60	8:25.57	60
2nd place, silver medalist(s)	Valerie Maltais	Canada	45	8:25.62	54
3rd place, bronze medalist(s)	Bente Kerkhoff	Netherlands	27	8:25.85	48
4	Momoka Horikawa	Japan	16	8:26.38	43
5	Ivanie Blondin	Canada	6	8:34.51	40
6	Ayano Sato	Japan	3	8:34.69	38
7	Francesca Lollobrigida	Italy		8:34.99	36
8	Hou Jundan	China		8:35.12	34
9	Josephine Schlörb	Germany		8:35.37	32
10	Park Ji-woo	South Korea		8:35.48	31
11	Fran Vanhoutte	Belgium		8:35.82	30
12	Kaitlyn McGregor	Switzerland		8:35.94	29
13	Yang Binyu	China		8:36.02	28
14	Greta Myers	United States		8:36.07	27
15	Lim Lee-won	South Korea		8:36.09	26
16	Jeannine Rosner	Austria		8:36.24	25
17	Marijke Groenewoud	Netherlands		8:36.32	24
18	Ramona Härdi	Switzerland		8:36.42	23
19	Josie Hofmann	Germany		8:36.86	22
20	Sandrine Tas	Belgium		8:37.18	21
21	Lucie Korvasová	Czech Republic		8:37.33	20
22	Natalia Jabrzyk	Poland		8:51.42	19
23	Aurora Grinden Løvås	Norway		6:31.66	18

==== Team pursuit ====
The race started on 16 November 2025 at 13:00.

Rank	Pair	Lane	Country	Time	Diff	WC Points
1st place, gold medalist(s)	4	c	Japan; Miho Takagi; Ayano Sato; Hana Noake	2:52.13		60
2nd place, silver medalist(s)	2	c	Canada; Valerie Maltais; Ivanie Blondin; Isabelle Weidemann	2:52.40	+0.27	54
3rd place, bronze medalist(s)	3	s	United States; Brittany Bowe; Mia Manganello; Greta Myers	2:54.01	+1.88	48
4	3	c	Germany; Josie Hofmann; Josephine Schlörb; Lea Sophie Scholz	2:54.38	+2.26	43
5	4	s	Netherlands; Joy Beune; Antoinette Rijpma-de Jong; Elisa Dul	2:54.66	+2.53	40
6	2	s	China; Hou Jundan; Yang Binyu; Han Mei	2:56.38	+4.25	38
7	1	c	Norway; Ragne Wiklund; Aurora Grinden Løvås; Marte Bjerkreim Furnee	3:01.44	+9.31	36
8	1	s	Italy; Francesca Lollobrigida; Linda Rossi; Alice Marletti	3:05.05	+12.92	34

== Division B result summary ==
=== Men's events ===
Event	First place	Time	Second place	Time	Third place	Time	Report
500 m (1)	Xue Zhiwen; China	33.95; PB	Kim Jun-ho; South Korea	34.10	Lian Ziwen; China	34.26; PB	
500 m (2)	Yuma Murakami; Japan	34.30	Sebas Diniz; Netherlands	34.30; PB	Christopher Fiola; Canada	34.31; PB	
1000 m	Lian Ziwen; China	1:06.81; PB	Hendrik Dombek; Germany	1:07.36; PB	Oh Hyun-min; South Korea	1:07.68; PB	
1500 m	Liu Hanbin; China	1:43.03; PB	Antoine Gélinas-Beaulieu; Canada	1:43.28	Gabriel Odor; Austria	1:43.34	
5000 m	Alexander Farthofer; Austria	6:04.21; PB	Peder Kongshaug; Norway	6:05.89; PB	Gabriel Groß; Germany	6:06.75; PB	
Mass start^{A}	Cho Seung-min; South Korea	62	Jake Weidemann; Canada	40	Zhou Zihan; China	20	
Team pursuit	Germany; Patrick Beckert; Felix Maly; Fridtjof Petzold	3:39.17	Poland; Vladimir Semirunniy; Szymon Palka; Marcim Bachanek	3:40.52	South Korea; Chung Jae-won; Yang Ho-jun; Cho Seung-min	3:40.91	

^{A} In mass start, race points are accumulated during the race based on results of the intermediate sprints and the final sprint. The skater with most race points is the winner.

=== Women's events ===
Event	First place	Time	Second place	Time	Third place	Time	Report
500 m (1)	Chen Ying-chu; Chinese Taipei	37.78; PB	Pei Chong; China	37.81; PB	Iori Kitahara; Japan	37.90; PB	
500 m (2)	Rio Yamada; Japan	37.62; PB	Kurumi Inagawa; Japan	37.69	Carolina Hiller-Donnelly; Canada	37.74	
1000 m	Ellia Smeding; Great Britain	1:14.54	Alexa Scott; Canada	1:14.58; PB	Kim Min-sun; South Korea	1:14.66	
1500 m	Nadezhda Morozova; Kazakhstan	1:51.65; PB	Kaitlyn McGregor; Switzerland	1:52.31; PB	Elizaveta Golubeva; Kazakhstan	1:53.00	
3000 m	Nadezhda Morozova; Kazakhstan	3:58.03; PB	Marina Zueva; Individual Neutral Athletes	3:59.88	Kseniia Korzhova; Individual Neutral Athletes	3:59.95; PB	
Mass start^{A}	Elizaveta Golubeva; Kazakhstan	62	Jeannine Rosner; Austria	41	Momoka Horikawa; Japan	20	
Team pursuit	Kazakhstan; Nadezhda Morozova; Arina Ilyachsehenko; Elizaveta Golubeva	2:57.81	Belgium; Fran Vanhoutte; Isabelle van Elst; Sandrine Tas	2:58.38	Poland; Natalia Jabrzyk; Natalia Czerwonka; Zofia Braun	2:58.41	

^{A} In mass start, race points are accumulated during the race based on results of the intermediate sprints and the final sprint. The skater with most race points is the winner.
