= List of Japanese records in speed skating =

The following are the national records in speed skating in Japan maintained by the Japan Skating Federation (KBSF).

== Men ==
Key to tables: Awaiting ratification Record not kept by KBSF Not ratified or later rescinded by KBSF

Event	Record	Athlete	Date	Meet	Place	Ref
500 meters	33.79	Tatsuya Shinhama	10 March 2019	World Cup	Salt Lake City, United States	
500 meters × 2	68.96	Hiroyasu Shimizu	10 March 2001	World Single Distance Championships	Salt Lake City, United States	
1000 meters	1:06.68	Taiyo Nonomura	21 January 2024	Four Continents Championships	Salt Lake City, United States	
1500 meters	1:42.25	Kazuya Yamada	15 November 2025	World Cup	Salt Lake City, United States	
3000 meters	3:38.54	Shomu Sasaki	6 September 2025		Obihiro, Japan	
5000 meters	6:08.83	Shomu Sasaki	14 November 2025	World Cup	Salt Lake City, United States	
10000 meters	12:55.62	Ryousuke Tsuchiya	14 February 2020	World Single Distances Championships	Salt Lake City, United States	
Team sprint (3 laps)	1:19.59	Yuma Murakami; Yamato Matsui; Masaya Yamada	13 February 2020	World Single Distances Championships	Salt Lake City, United States	
Team pursuit (8 laps)	3:36.41	Seitaro Ichinohe; Riku Tsuchiya; Shane Williamson	15 February 2020	World Single Distances Championships	Salt Lake City, United States	
Sprint combination	137.465 pts	Tatsuya Shinhama	28–29 February 2020	World Sprint Championships	Hamar, Norway	
Small combination	149.483 pts	Shingo Doi	12–14 March 2008	Olympic Oval Finals	Calgary, Canada	
Big combination	149.310 pts	Seitaro Ichinohe	29 February – 1 March 2020	World Allround Championships	Hamar, Norway	

== Women ==
Event	Record	Athlete	Date	Meet	Place	Ref
500 meters	36.39	Nao Kodaira	16 March 2019	Olympic Oval Finale	Calgary, Canada	
500 meters × 2	75.20	Sayuri Osuga	10 March 2007	World Single Distance Championships	Salt Lake City, United States	
1000 meters	1:11.71	Miho Takagi	9 March 2019	World Cup	Salt Lake City, United States	
1500 meters	1:49.83 WR	Miho Takagi	10 March 2019	World Cup	Salt Lake City, United States	
3000 meters	3:55.45	Miho Takagi	10 December 2021	World Cup	Calgary, Canada	
5000 meters	6:55.07	Eriko Ishino	18 February 2011	World Cup	Salt Lake City, United States	
10000 meters	15:01.95	Hiromi Yamamoto	27 March 1994	Olympic Oval Final	Calgary, Canada	
Team sprint (3 laps)	1:24.32	Kurumi Inagawa; Ayano Sato; Miho Takagi	19 January 2024	Four Continents Championships	Salt Lake City, United States	
Team pursuit (6 laps)	2:50.76 WR	Nana Takagi; Ayano Sato; Miho Takagi	14 February 2020	World Single Distances Championships	Salt Lake City, United States	
Sprint combination	146.390 pts WR	Nao Kodaira	25–26 February 2017	World Sprint Championships	Calgary, Canada	
Mini combination	156.878 pts	Maki Tabata	15–17 March 2001	Olympic Oval Finals	Calgary, Canada	
Small combination	156.878 pts	Miho Takagi	2–3 March 2019	World Allround Championships	Calgary, Canada	

== Mixed ==
Event	Record	Athlete	Date	Meet	Place	Ref
Relay	3:06.21	Kotaro Kasahara; Yuka Takahashi	12 November 2023	World Cup	Obihiro, Japan	
