= List of Swiss records in speed skating =

The following are the national records in speed skating in Switzerland maintained by the Schweizer Eislauf-Verband (SEV).

== Men ==
Key to tables: Awaiting ratification Record not kept by SEV Not ratified or later rescinded by SEV

Event	Record	Athlete	Date	Meet	Place	Ref
500 meters	35.12	Christian Oberbichler	12 December 2021	World Cup	Calgary, Canada	
500 meters × 2						
1000 meters	1:09.79	Livio Wenger	2 December 2017	World Cup	Calgary, Canada	
1500 meters	1:44.09	Livio Wenger	16 February 2020	World Single Distances Championships	Salt Lake City, United States	
3000 meters	3:41.05	Livio Wenger	23 February 2019	Time Trials	Calgary, Canada	
5000 meters	6:10.14	Thibault Métraux	14 November 2025	World Cup	Salt Lake City, United States	
10000 meters	13:08.35	Thibault Métraux	6 December 2025	World Cup	Heerenveen, Netherlands	
Team sprint (3 laps)	1:20.03	Livio Wenger; Christian Oberbichler; Oliver Grob	13 February 2020	World Single Distances Championships	Salt Lake City, United States	
Team pursuit (8 laps)	3:41.23	Livio Wenger; Flavio Gross; Thibault Métraux	16 November 2025	World Cup	Salt Lake City, United States	
Sprint combination	145.285 pts	Christian Oberbichler	3–4 January 2015	Swiss Sprint Championships	Inzell, Germany	
Small combination	152.086 pts	Livio Wenger	16–17 December 2023	Swiss Championships	Inzell, Germany	
Big combination	159.682 pts	Martin Feigenwinter	15–16 January 2000	European Championships	Hamar, Norway	

== Women ==
Event	Record	Athlete	Date	Meet	Place	Ref
500 meters	38.98	Kaitlyn McGregor	22 November 2025	World Cup	Calgary, Canada	
500 meters × 2						
1000 meters	1:14.66	Kaitlyn McGregor	14 November 2025	World Cup	Salt Lake City, United States	
1500 meters	1:52.31	Kaitlyn McGregor	15 November 2025	World Cup	Salt Lake City, United States	
3000 meters	3:59.26	Kaitlyn McGregor	21 November 2025	World Cup	Calgary, Canada	
5000 meters	7:16.60	Ramona Härdi	5 December 2025	World Cup	Heerenveen, Netherlands	
10000 meters						
Team pursuit (6 laps)	2:58.98	Kaitlyn McGregor; Ramona Härdi; Jasmin Güntert	16 November 2025	World Cup	Salt Lake City, United States	
Sprint combination	159.130 pts	Kaitlyn McGregor	16–17 December 2023	Swiss Championships	Inzell, Germany	
Mini combination	163.942 pts	Kaitlyn McGregor	15–16 March 2011	Olympic Oval Final	Calgary, Canada	
Small combination	184.117 pts	Henriët Bosker	20–21 December 2003		Inzell, Germany	

== Mixed ==
Event	Record	Athlete	Date	Meet	Place	Ref
Relay	2:59.09	Livio Wenger; Kaitlyn McGregor	2 March 2025	World Cup	Heerenveen, Netherlands	
