= Speed skating at the 2025 Asian Winter Games – Men's team sprint =

Men's team sprint at the 2025 Asian Winter Games
- Venue: Heilongjiang Speed Skating Hall
- Dates: 10 February 2025
- Competitors: 15 from 5 nations

Medalists
gold medal	China; Gao Tingyu, Lian Ziwen, Ning Zhongyan
silver medal	South Korea; Kim Jun-ho, Cha Min-kyu, Cho Sang-hyeok
bronze medal	Japan; Katsuhiro Kuratsubo, Wataru Morishige, Kazuya Yamada

The men's team sprint competition in speed skating at the 2025 Asian Winter Games was held on 10 February 2025 in Harbin, China.

== Schedule ==
All times are China Standard Time (UTC+08:00)

Date	Time	Event
Monday, 10 February 2025	14:07	Final

== Records ==
Prior to this competition, the existing world and Games records were as follows.

World Record	United States	1:16.98	Calgary, Canada	26 January 2025
Games Record	—	—	—	—

== Results ==
Rank	Pair	Team	Time	Notes
1st place, gold medalist(s)	2	China (CHN); Gao Tingyu; Lian Ziwen; Ning Zhongyan	1:19.22	GR
2nd place, silver medalist(s)	2	South Korea (KOR); Kim Jun-ho; Cha Min-kyu; Cho Sang-hyeok	1:20.48	
3rd place, bronze medalist(s)	3	Japan (JPN); Katsuhiro Kuratsubo; Wataru Morishige; Kazuya Yamada	1:20.72	
4	3	Kazakhstan (KAZ); Nikita Vazhenin; Artur Galiyev; Altay Zhardembekuly	1:23.05	
5	1	India (IND); Chandra Mouli Danda; Amitesh Mishra; Vishwaraj Jadeja	1:41.13	
