= Mike Hall (speed skater) =

Canadian speed skater

Personal information
- Full name: Michael Larry Hall
- Born: 4 January 1970 (age 56) Kamsack, Saskatchewan, Canada

Sport
- Sport: Speed skating

Michael Larry Mike Hall (born 4 January 1970) is a Canadian speed skater. He competed in the men's 5000 metres event at the 1994 Winter Olympics.

Hall's two children compete in the sport: Daniel Hall and Laura Hall.
