= Shomu Sasaki =

Japanese speed skater (born 2006)

Personal information
- Born: 11 February 2006 (age 20) Nagano, Japan

Sport
- Country: Japan
- Sport: Speed skating
- Event(s): Mass start, team pursuit
Medal record
Men's speed skating
Representing Japan
Four Continents Championships
| Silver medal – second place | 2024 Salt Lake City | Mass start |
| Silver medal – second place | 2025 Hachinohe | Team pursuit |
| Bronze medal – third place | 2024 Salt Lake City | Team pursuit |
World Junior Championships
| Gold medal – first place | 2022 Innsbruck | Team pursuit |
| Gold medal – first place | 2025 Calgary | Team pursuit |
| Silver medal – second place | 2025 Calgary | Mass start |
| Bronze medal – third place | 2023 Inzell | Team pursuit |
| Bronze medal – third place | 2024 Gdańsk | 3000 m relay |

Shomu Sasaki (佐々木翔夢, Sasaki Shomu; born 11 February 2006) is a Japanese speed skater. He represented Japan at the 2026 Winter Olympics.

== Career ==
On 14 November 2025, during World Cup 1 of the 2025–26 ISU Speed Skating World Cup, he set a Japanese record in the 5000 metres with a time of 6:08.83.

In January 2026, he was selected to represent Japan at the 2026 Winter Olympics. On 8 February 2026, he competed in the 5000 metres and finished in 20th place. On 21 February 2026, he competed in the mass start and advanced to the finals in second place.
