= Hana Noake =

Japanese speed skater (born 2004)

Personal information
- Born: 28 November 2004 (age 21) Shimosuwa, Nagano, Japan

Sport
- Country: Japan
- Sport: Speed skating
- Event(s): Mass start, team pursuit
- Club: Rikkyo University
Medal record
Women's speed skating
Representing Japan
Olympic Games
Bronze medal – third place	2026 Milano Cortina	Team pursuit
World Junior Championships
Gold medal – first place	2024 Hachinohe	Team pursuit
Silver medal – second place	2024 Hachinohe	3000 m
Bronze medal – third place	2024 Hachinohe	500 m
Bronze medal – third place	2024 Hachinohe	Mass start
Four Continents Championships
Silver medal – second place	2025 Hachinohe	Team pursuit

Hana Noake (野明 花菜, Noake Hana; born 28 November 2004) is a Japanese speed skater.

== Career ==
In February 2024, Noake competed at the 2024 World Junior Speed Skating Championships and won a gold medal in the team pursuit, a silver medal in the 3000 metres, and bronze medals in the 500 metres and mass start. In November 2024, she competed at the 2025 Four Continents Speed Skating Championships and won a silver medal in the team pursuit with a time of 3:04.02.

In November 2025, during World Cup #1 of the 2025–26 ISU Speed Skating World Cup, she won a gold medal in the team pursuit, along with Miho Takagi and Ayano Sato.

== Personal life ==
Her parents are Hiroyuki Noake and Mie Uehara, both were former speed skater.
