= Kazuya Yamada =

Japanese speed skater (born 2001)

Personal information
- Nationality: Japanese
- Born: 27 September 2001 (age 24) Hokkaido, Japan

Sport
- Country: Japan
- Sport: Speed skating
- Event(s): 1000 m, 1500 m, team pursuit
Medal record
Men's speed skating
Representing Japan
World University Games
Gold medal – first place	2023 Lake Placid	Team pursuit
Gold medal – first place	2023 Lake Placid	1000 m
Silver medal – second place	2023 Lake Placid	500 m
Silver medal – second place	2023 Lake Placid	1500 m
Asian Games
Silver medal – second place	2025 Harbin	1500 m
Bronze medal – third place	2025 Harbin	Team sprint

Kazuya Yamada (Japanese: 山田和哉, born 27 September 2001) is a Japanese speed-skater.

== Career ==
Yamada competed at the 2023 Winter World University Games and won a gold medal in the team pursuit and 1000 metress, with a time of 1:12.38. He also won silver medals in the 500 metres and 1500 metres.

During World Cup 1 of the 2025–26 ISU Speed Skating World Cup on 15 November 2025, he set a Japanese record in the 1500 metres with a time of 1:42.25. In January 2026, he was selected to represent Japan at the 2026 Winter Olympics.

== Personal life ==
Yamada's older brother, Masaya, is a former speed skater.
