= 2024 World Junior Speed Skating Championships =

International speed skating competition

- Venue: YS Arena, Hachinohe, Japan
- Dates: 9–11 February

Medalist men
1st place, gold medalist(s)		Didrik Eng Strand	Norway
2nd place, silver medalist(s)		Finn Sonnekalb	Germany
3rd place, bronze medalist(s)		Finn Elias Haneberg	Norway

Medalist women
1st place, gold medalist(s)		Angel Daleman	Netherlands
2nd place, silver medalist(s)		Aurora Grinden Løvås	Norway
3rd place, bronze medalist(s)		Meike Veen	Netherlands

The 2024 World Junior Speed Skating Championships took place from 9 to 11 February 2024 in Hachinohe, Japan.

== Schedule ==
All times are local (UTC+9).

Date	Time	Events
9 February	10:00	500 m women 500 m men 1500 m women 1500 m men Mass start semifinals women Mass start semifinals men
10 February	10:00	1000 m women 1000 m men 3000 m women 5000 m men
11 February	10:00	Team pursuit women Team pursuit men Team sprint women Team sprint men Mass start final women Mass start final men

== Medal summary ==
=== Medal table ===
* Host nation (Japan)

Rank	Nation	Gold	Silver	Bronze	Total
1	Netherlands	6	2	3	11
2	Norway	5	2	2	9
3	Japan*	2	5	6	13
4	South Korea	2	1	0	3
5	Canada	1	2	1	4
6	Germany	0	2	1	3
7	Kazakhstan	0	1	1	2
8	Czech Republic	0	1	0	1
9	Poland	0	0	2	2
Totals (9 entries)		16	16	16	48

=== Men's events ===
Event	Gold		Silver		Bronze	
500 m	Koo Kyung-min; South Korea	35.55	Yuta Hirose; Japan	35.57	Issa Gunji; Japan	35.65
1000 m	Koo Kyung-min; South Korea	1:10.52	Issa Gunji; Japan	1:10.75	Finn Sonnekalb; Germany	1:10.82
1500 m	Didrik Eng Strand; Norway	1:48.06	Finn Sonnekalb; Germany	1:48.18	Szymon Wojtakowski; Poland	1:48.84
5000 m	Sigurd Henriksen; Norway	6:18.76	Metoděj Jílek; Czech Republic	6:19.60	Didrik Eng Strand; Norway	6:27.63
Mass start	Yuta Fuchigami; Japan	30 pts	Daniel Hall; Canada	20 pts	Taiki Shingai; Japan	10 pts
Team pursuit	Canada; Daniel Hall; Max Poulin; Luca Veeman	3:49.25	Norway; Finn Elias Haneberg; Sigurd Henriksen; Didrik Eng Strand	3:49.44	Japan; Yuta Fuchigami; Takumi Murashita; Taiki Shingai	3:53.13
Team sprint	Norway; Finn Elias Haneberg; Miika Johan Klevstuen; Didrik Eng Strand	1:22.77	Canada; Jalen Doan; Max Poulin; Luca Veeman	1:23.20	Poland; Kacper Abratkiewicz; Mateusz Śliwka; Szymon Wojtakowski	1:23.25
Overall classification	Didrik Eng Strand; Norway	147.348	Finn Sonnekalb; Germany	148.014	Finn Elias Haneberg; Norway	149.172

=== Women's events ===
Event	Gold		Silver		Bronze	
500 m	Angel Daleman; Netherlands	39.12	Jung Hui-dan; South Korea	39.55	Hana Noake; Japan	39.80
1000 m	Angel Daleman; Netherlands	1:18.03	Emika Miyagawa; Japan	1:18.54	Meike Veen; Netherlands	1:19.06
1500 m	Angel Daleman; Netherlands	1:58.72	Emika Miyagawa; Japan	2:00.61	Meike Veen; Netherlands	2:00.84
3000 m	Aurora Grinden Løvås; Norway	4:12.35	Hana Noake; Japan	4:13.32	Akane Iida; Japan	4:15.87
Mass start	Angel Daleman; Netherlands	30 pts	Patricia Koot; Netherlands	20 pts	Hana Noake; Japan	10 pts
Team pursuit	Japan; Yukina Hatakeyama; Emika Miyagawa; Hana Noake	3:08.55	Netherlands; Angel Daleman; Patricia Koot; Meike Veen	3:09.48	Kazakhstan; Marija Degen; Alina Shumekova; Kristina Shumekova	3:11.94
Team sprint	Netherlands; Angel Daleman; Jillian Knook; Meike Veen	1:29.60	Kazakhstan; Darja Gavrilova; Alina Shumekova; Kristina Shumekova	1:31.28	Canada; Julia Snelgrove; Camille Tremblay; Skylar Van Horne	1:32.66
Overall classification	Angel Daleman; Netherlands	160.840	Aurora Grinden Løvås; Norway	163.626	Meike Veen; Netherlands	163.761
