= Laura Hall (speed skater) =

Canadian speed skater (born 2003)

Personal information
- Born: February 20, 2003 (age 23) Salmon Arm, British Columbia, Canada

Sport
- Country: Canada
- Sport: Speed skating
- Event(s): 3000 m, 5000 m
Medal record
Women's speed skating
Representing Canada
Winter World University Games
Gold medal – first place	2023 Lake Placid	3000 m
Four Continents Championships
Silver medal – second place	2022 Calgary	3000 m
Silver medal – second place	2022 Calgary	Team pursuit

Laura Hall (born February 20, 2003) is a Canadian speed skater. Hall competes primarily in the longer distances of 3000 m and 5000 m.

== Career ==
Hall's first major competition was the 2019 Canada Winter Games in Red Deer, Alberta, where Hall won a bronze medal in the team pursuit.

At the 2022 Four Continents Speed Skating Championships in Calgary, Hall won two silver medals: the women's 3000 metres, and was part of the women's team pursuit. At the 2023 World University Games in Lake Placid, Hall won the gold medal in the women's 3000 metres event.

== Personal life ==
Hall's father is Michael Hall, who competed in speed skating for Canada at the 1994 Winter Olympics. Hall's brother, Daniel Hall is also a competitive speed skater.
