= Greta Myers =

American speed skater (born 2004)

Personal information
- Born: May 22, 2004 (age 22) Lino Lakes, Minnesota, U.S.

Sport
- Country: United States
- Sport: Speed skating
Medal record
Women's speed skating
Representing the United States
Four Continents Championships
Bronze medal – third place	2024 Salt Lake City	1500 m
Bronze medal – third place	2024 Salt Lake City	Team pursuit
World Junior Championships
Silver medal – second place	2023 Inzell	Team pursuit
Silver medal – second place	2023 Inzell	Overall
Bronze medal – third place	2023 Inzell	1000 m
Bronze medal – third place	2023 Inzell	1500 m

Greta Myers (born May 22, 2004) is an American speed skater.

== Career ==
At the junior level, Myers competed at the 2023 World Junior Speed Skating Championships and won four medals, including silver in team pursuit & overall and bronze in 1000 meters & 1500 meters.

In 2024, she competed at the 2024 Four Continents Speed Skating Championships and won two bronze medals in 1500 meters and team pursuit.

== World Cup overview ==
Season	Location	1000 meter
2024–2025	(Japan) Nagano	19th
2024–2025	(Poland) Tomaszów Mazowiecki	20th

Season	Location	1500 meter
2023–2024	(Canada) Quebec	15th
2024–2025	(Japan) Nagano	19th
2024–2025	(Canada) Calgary	11th
2024–2025	(Poland) Tomaszów Mazowiecki	13th
2024–2025	(Netherlands) Heerenveen	20th
2025–2026	(United States) Salt Lake City	17th
2025–2026	(Canada) Calgary	18th
2025–2026	(Netherlands) Heerenveen	20th
2025–2026	(Norway) Hamar	17th
2025–2026	(Germany) Inzell	13th

Season	Location	3000 meter
2023–2024	(China) Beijing	16th
2024–2025	(Japan) Nagano	14th

Season	Location	Mass start
2024–2025	(Japan) Nagano	9th
2024–2025	(China) Beijing	17th
2024–2025	(Canada) Calgary	1st place, gold medalist(s)
2024–2025	(United States) Milwaukee	12th
2024–2025	(Poland) Tomaszów Mazowiecki	17th
2024–2025	(Netherlands) Heerenveen	6th
2025–2026	(United States) Salt Lake City	14th
2025–2026	(Canada) Calgary	11th
2025–2026	(Netherlands) Heerenveen	17th
2025–2026	(Norway) Hamar	16th
2025–2026	(Germany) Inzell	11th

Season	Location	Team sprint
2023–2024	(Canada) Quebec	5th

Season	Location	Team pursuit
2022–2023	(Norway) Stavanger	6th
2023–2024	(Japan) Obihiro	7th
2023–2024	(Poland) Tomaszów Mazowiecki	7th
2024–2025	(Japan) Nagano	3rd place, bronze medalist(s)
2024–2025	(United States) Milwaukee	3rd place, bronze medalist(s)
2024–2025	(Netherlands) Heerenveen	3rd place, bronze medalist(s)
2025–2026	(United States) Salt Lake City	3rd place, bronze medalist(s)
