= Koo Kyung-min =

South Korean speed skater (born 2005)

Personal information
- Born: 2 January 2005 (age 21) Seoul, South Korea

Sport
- Country: South Korea
- Sport: Speed skating
- Event(s): 500 m, 1000 m
Medal record
Men's short-track speed skating
Representing South Korea
World Junior Championships
Gold medal – first place	2024 Hachinohe	500 m
Gold medal – first place	2024 Hachinohe	1000 m
Bronze medal – third place	2023 Inzell	Team sprint

Koo Kyung-min (Korean: 구경민; born 2 January 2005) is a South Korean speed skater. He represented South Korea at the 2026 Winter Olympics.

== Career ==
Koo competed at the 2024 World Junior Speed Skating Championships and won gold medals in the 500 metres and 1000 metres.

In January 2026, he was selected to represent South Korea at the 2026 Winter Olympics. He made his Olympic debut on 11 February 2026, and finished in tenth place in the 1000 metres with a time of 1:08.53. On 14 February, he then competed in the 500 metres and finished in 15th place with a time of 34.80 seconds.
