= Daniel Hall (speed skater) =

Canadian speed skater (born 2005)

Personal information
- Born: March 23, 2005 (age 21) Salmon Arm, British Columbia, Canada

Sport
- Country: Canada
- Sport: Speed skating
- Event(s): 1,500 m, 5,000 m

Achievements and titles
- Personal best(s): 500 = 36.91; 1,000 = 1.09.92; 1,500 = 1.44.23; 3,000 = 3.46.62; 5,000 = 6.16.57; 10,000 = 13.26.84
Medal record
Men's speed skating
Representing Canada
World Junior Championships
Gold medal – first place	2024 Hachinohe	Team pursuit
Silver medal – second place	2024 Hachinohe	Mass start
Silver medal – second place	2023 Inzell	Mass start

Daniel Hall (born March 23, 2005) is a Canadian speed skater. He competes primarily in the middle and long distances.

== Career ==
Hall's first major competition was the 2023 Canada Winter Games, where Hall won two medals, including the gold medal in the 5,000 metres event. At the World Junior Speed Skating Championships, Hall won three medals. In 2023 and 2024, Hall won the silver in the mass start event. In 2024, Hall would also win a gold medal as part of the team pursuit.

At the 2026 Canadian Olympic trials, Hall finished second in the 1,500 meteres event, clinching a spot on Canada's 2026 Olympic team.

== Personal life ==
Hall's father is Michael Hall, who competed in speed skating for Canada at the 1994 Winter Olympics. Hall's sister, Laura Hall is also a competitive speed skater.
