= 2024–25 ISU Speed Skating World Cup – World Cup 5 =

Ice skating competition in Tomaszów Mazowiecki, Poland

2024–25 ISU Speed Skating World Cup 5
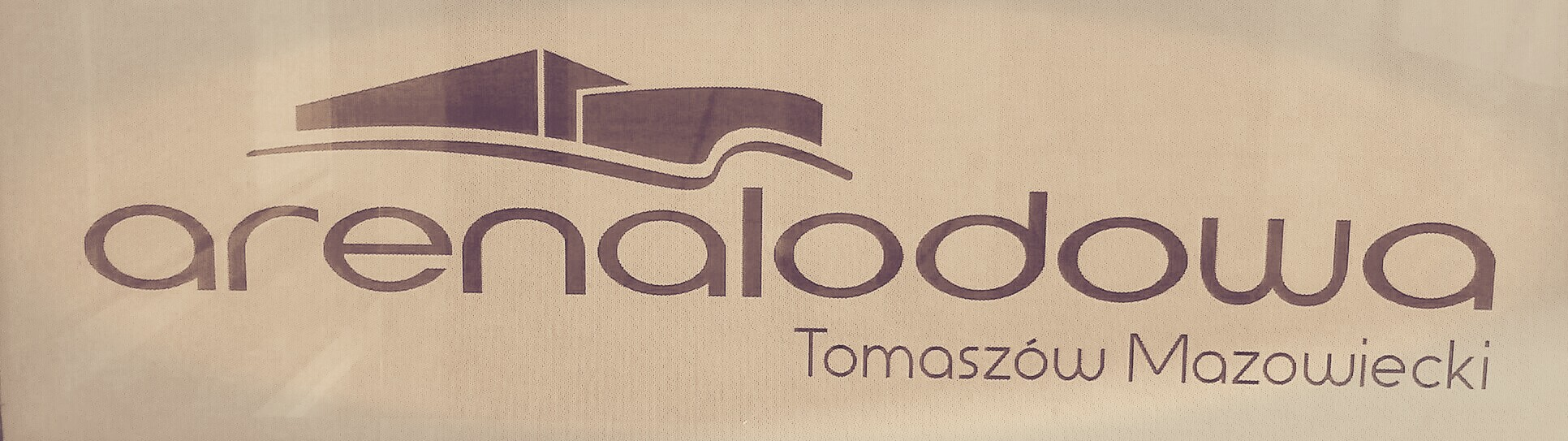
- Venue: Ice Arena Tomaszów Mazowiecki; Tomaszów Mazowiecki; Poland
- Dates: 21 — 23 February 2025

The fifth competition weekend of the 2024–25 ISU Speed Skating World Cup took place at the Ice Arena Tomaszów Mazowiecki in Tomaszów Mazowiecki, Poland, from Friday, 21 to Sunday, 23 February 2025.

== Medal summary ==
=== Men's events ===
Event	Gold	Time	Silver	Time	Bronze	Time	Report
500 m (1)	Jordan Stolz; United States	34.49	Laurent Dubreuil; Canada	34.73	Kim Jun-ho; South Korea	34.77	
500 m (2)	Yevgeniy Koshkin; Kazakhstan	34.52	Laurent Dubreuil; Canada	34.70	Marek Kania; Poland	34.76	
1000 m	Jordan Stolz; United States	1:08.42; TR	Kjeld Nuis; Netherlands	1:08.78	Ning Zhongyan; China	1:08.84	
1500 m	Jordan Stolz; United States	1:45.08; TR	Peder Kongshaug; Norway	1:45.08	Ning Zhongyan; China	1:46.06	
5000 m	Sander Eitrem; Norway	6:16.62	Davide Ghiotto; Italy	6:18.29	Metoděj Jílek; Czech Republic	6:18.87	
Mass start^{A}	Lee Seung-hoon; South Korea	60	Bart Hoolwerf; Netherlands	40	Andrea Giovannini; Italy	21	
Team sprint	United States; Conor McDermott-Mostowy; Cooper Mcleod; Zach Stoppelmoor	1:19.27	South Korea; Kim Jun-ho; Cha Min-kyu; Cho Sanghyeok	1:20.47	China; Xue Zhiwen; Lian Ziwen; Deng Zhihan	1:20.55	

^{A} In mass start, race points are accumulated during the race based on results of the intermediate sprints and the final sprint. The skater with most race points is the winner.

=== Women's events ===
Event	Gold	Time	Silver	Time	Bronze	Time	Report
500 m (1)	Erin Jackson; United States	38.08	Suzanne Schulting; Netherlands	38.17	Kaja Ziomek-Nogal; Poland	38.31	
500 m (2)	Erin Jackson; United States	37.81	Suzanne Schulting; Netherlands	37.92	Andżelika Wójcik; Poland	38.06	
1000 m	Miho Takagi; Japan	1:14.80	Han Mei; China	1:16.31	Rio Yamada; Japan	1:16.33	
1500 m	Marijke Groenewoud; Netherlands	1:56.67	Miho Takagi; Japan	1:57.50	Han Mei; China	1:57.56	
3000 m	Ragne Wiklund; Norway	4:03.70	Merel Conijn; Netherlands	4:04.59	Francesca Lollobrigida; Italy	4:05.32	
Mass start^{A}	Marijke Groenewoud; Netherlands	61	Francesca Lollobrigida; Italy	40	Ivanie Blondin; Canada	20	
Team sprint	Poland; Andżelika Wójcik; Kaja Ziomek-Nogal; Karolina Bosiek	1:28.07	Canada; Carolina Hiller; Béatrice Lamarche; Ivanie Blondin	1:28.30	Netherlands; Dione Voskamp; Naomi Verkerk; Suzanne Schulting	1:28.46	

^{A} In mass start, race points are accumulated during the race based on results of the intermediate sprints and the final sprint. The skater with most race points is the winner.

== Results ==
=== Men's events ===
==== 1st 500 m ====
The race started on 21 February 2025 at 18:58.

Rank	Pair	Lane	Name	Country	Time	Diff
1st place, gold medalist(s)	10	i	Jordan Stolz	United States	34.49	
2nd place, silver medalist(s)	10	o	Laurent Dubreuil	Canada	34.73	+0.24
3rd place, bronze medalist(s)	4	i	Kim Jun-ho	South Korea	34.77	+0.28
4	9	i	Tatsuya Shinhama	Japan	34.81	+0.32
5	5	i	Sebastian Diniz	Netherlands	34.82	+0.33
6	6	o	Wataru Morishige	Japan	34.87	+0.38
7	8	i	Damian Żurek	Poland	34.95	+0.46
8	9	o	Cooper McLeod	United States	34.97	+0.48
9	7	o	Marten Liiv	Estonia	34.97	+0.48
10	8	o	Marek Kania	Poland	35.00	+0.51
11	7	i	Merijn Scheperkamp	Netherlands	35.01	+0.52
12	6	i	Stefan Westenbroek	Netherlands	35.08	+0.59
13	3	i	Piotr Michalski	Poland	35.08	+0.59
14	5	o	Bjørn Magnussen	Norway	35.08	+0.59
15	3	o	Gao Tingyu	China	35.11	+0.62
16	2	o	Lian Ziwen	China	35.18	+0.69
17	1	o	Xue Zhiwen	China	35.27	+0.78
18	4	o	Zach Stoppelmoor	United States	35.32	+0.83
19	2	i	Anders Johnson	Canada	35.42	+0.93
20	1	i	Christopher Fiola	Canada	35.75	+1.26

==== 2nd 500 m ====
The race started on 23 February 2025 at 14:58.

Rank	Pair	Lane	Name	Country	Time	Diff
1st place, gold medalist(s)	2	o	Yevgeniy Koshkin	Kazakhstan	34.52	
2nd place, silver medalist(s)	8	o	Laurent Dubreuil	Canada	34.70	+0.18
3rd place, bronze medalist(s)	8	i	Marek Kania	Poland	34.76	+0.24
4	7	i	Wataru Morishige	Japan	34.81	+0.29
5	10	o	Jordan Stolz	United States	34.84	+0.32
6	5	i	Kim Jun-ho	South Korea	34.88	+0.36
7	9	i	Cooper McLeod	United States	34.91	+0.39
8	9	o	Tatsuya Shinhama	Japan	34.94	+0.42
9	7	o	Sebastian Diniz	Netherlands	34.94	+0.42
10	3	i	Gao Tingyu	China	34.96	+0.44
11	6	o	Stefan Westenbroek	Netherlands	35.01	+0.49
12	6	i	Marten Liiv	Estonia	35.05	+0.53
13	1	o	Janno Botman	Netherlands	35.09	+0.57
14	3	o	Lian Ziwen	China	35.13	+0.61
15	5	o	Bjørn Magnussen	Norway	35.16	+0.64
16	4	o	Piotr Michalski	Poland	35.20	+0.68
17	10	i	Damian Żurek	Poland	35.26	+0.74
18	2	i	Anders Johnson	Canada	35.42	+0.90
19	1	i	Nil Llop	Spain	35.51	+0.99
20	4	i	Zach Stoppelmoor	United States	35.62	+1.10

==== 1000 m ====
The race started on 22 February 2025 at 17:17.

Rank	Pair	Lane	Name	Country	Time	Diff
1st place, gold medalist(s)	8	i	Jordan Stolz	United States	1:08.42; TR	
2nd place, silver medalist(s)	10	i	Kjeld Nuis	Netherlands	1:08.78	+0.36
3rd place, bronze medalist(s)	9	i	Ning Zhongyan	China	1:08.84	+0.42
4	10	o	Cooper McLeod	United States	1:08.85	+0.43
5	6	o	Joep Wennemars	Netherlands	1:09.21	+0.79
6	7	o	Damian Żurek	Poland	1:09.31	+0.89
7	2	i	Marek Kania	Poland	1:09.51	+1.09
8	4	i	Ryota Kojima	Japan	1:09.63	+1.21
9	5	i	Laurent Dubreuil	Canada	1:09.69	+1.27
10	8	o	Marten Liiv	Estonia	1:09.71	+1.29
11	5	o	Moritz Klein	Germany	1:09.95	+1.53
11	6	i	Taiyo Nonomura	Japan	1:09.95	+1.53
13	1	i	Piotr Michalski	Poland	1:10.03	+1.61
14	2	o	Hendrik Dombek	Germany	1:10.10	+1.68
15	4	o	Stefan Emele	Germany	1:10.21	+1.79
16	9	o	Kim Min-seok	Hungary	1:10.26	+1.84
17	3	o	Connor Howe	Canada	1:10.44	+2.02
18	3	i	Zach Stoppelmoor	United States	1:11.05	+2.63
19	1	o	Kazuya Yamada	Japan	1:11.15	+2.73
20	7	i	Tatsuya Shinhama	Japan	1:11.40	+2.98

==== 1500 m ====
The race started on 21 February 2025 at 20:17.

Rank	Pair	Lane	Name	Country	Time	Diff
1st place, gold medalist(s)	8	i	Jordan Stolz	United States	1:45.08; TR	
2nd place, silver medalist(s)	8	o	Peder Kongshaug	Norway	1:45.08	+0.00
3rd place, bronze medalist(s)	10	i	Ning Zhongyan	China	1:46.06	+0.98
4	9	o	Sander Eitrem	Norway	1:46.44	+1.36
5	9	i	Kjeld Nuis	Netherlands	1:46.69	+1.61
6	3	i	Daniele Di Stefano	Italy	1:47.36	+2.28
7	7	i	Connor Howe	Canada	1:47.56	+2.48
8	5	o	Wesly Dijs	Netherlands	1:47.72	+2.64
9	6	o	Stefan Emele	Germany	1:47.86	+2.78
10	10	o	Kim Min-seok	Hungary	1:47.90	+2.82
11	7	o	Taiyo Nonomura	Japan	1:48.05	+2.97
12	6	i	Seitaro Ichinohe	Japan	1:48.12	+3.04
13	2	o	Ryota Kojima	Japan	1:48.18	+3.10
14	1	i	Moritz Klein	Germany	1:48.41	+3.33
15	2	i	David La Rue	Canada	1:48.44	+3.36
16	3	o	Joep Wennemars	Netherlands	1:48.81	+3.73
17	1	o	Motonaga Arito	Japan	1:48.93	+3.85
18	4	o	Bart Swings	Belgium	1:49.00	+3.92
19	4	i	Tijmen Snel	Netherlands	1:49.32	+4.24
20	5	i	Kazuya Yamada	Japan	1:49.53	+4.45

==== 5000 m ====
The race started on 22 February 2025 at 15:26.

Rank	Pair	Lane	Name	Country	Time	Diff
1st place, gold medalist(s)	7	i	Sander Eitrem	Norway	6:16.62	
2nd place, silver medalist(s)	6	i	Davide Ghiotto	Italy	6:18.29	+1.67
3rd place, bronze medalist(s)	4	i	Metodĕj Jílek	Czech Republic	6:18.87	+2.25
4	4	o	Timothy Loubineaud	France	6:19.70	+3.08
5	7	o	Casey Dawson	United States	6:20.83	+4.21
6	6	o	Bart Swings	Belgium	6:23.12	+6.50
7	5	i	Michele Malfatti	Italy	6:24.56	+7.94
8	1	i	Marwin Talsma	Netherlands	6:26.34	+9.72
9	8	o	Ted-Jan Bloemen	Canada	6:26.50	+9.88
10	2	o	Peder Kongshaug	Norway	6:28.28	+11.66
11	8	i	Graeme Fish	Canada	6:28.49	+11.87
12	5	o	Marcel Bosker	Netherlands	6:28.61	+11.99
13	2	i	Wu Yu	China	6:30.82	+14.20
14	1	o	Fridtjof Petzold	Germany	6:31.44	+14.82
15	3	i	Felix Maly	Germany	6:32.10	+15.48
16	3	o	Patrick Beckert	Germany	6:32.16	+15.54

==== Mass start ====
The race started on 23 February 2025 at 16:02.

Rank	Name	Country	Points	Time
1st place, gold medalist(s)	Lee Seung-hoon	South Korea	60	7:48.05
2nd place, silver medalist(s)	Bart Hoolwerf	Netherlands	40	7:48.51
3rd place, bronze medalist(s)	Andrea Giovannini	Italy	21	7:48.57
4	Shomu Sasaki	Japan	10	7:48.64
5	Bart Swings	Belgium	6	7:48.75
6	Jorrit Bergsma	Netherlands	6	8:02.51
7	Livio Wenger	Switzerland	3	7:48.81
8	David La Rue	Canada	2	7:55.49
9	Indra Medard	Belgium	2	8:03.07
10	Gabriel Odor	Austria	2	8:10.32
11	Ethan Cepuran	United States	1	7:50.60
12	Mathieu Belloir	France	1	8:03.64
13	Timothy Loubineaud	France		7:50.25
14	Daniele Di Stefano	Italy		7:50.26
15	Jake Weidemann	Canada		7:51.29
16	Pan Baoshuo	China		7:51.34
17	Fridtjof Petzold	Germany		7:52.42
18	Felix Maly	Germany		8:01.11
19	Allan Dahl Johansson	Norway		8:06.17
20	Philip Due Schmidt	Denmark	3	5:59.53

==== Team sprint ====
The race started on 23 February 2025 at 16:47.

Rank	Pair	Lane	Country	Time	Diff
1st place, gold medalist(s)	5	c	United States; Conor McDermott-Mostowy; Cooper McLeod; Zach Stoppelmoor	1:19.27	
2nd place, silver medalist(s)	3	c	South Korea; Kim Jun-ho; Cha Min-kyu; Cho Sanghyeok	1:20.47	+1.20
3rd place, bronze medalist(s)	3	s	China; Xue Zhiwen; Lian Ziwen; Deng Zhihan	1:20.55	+1.28
4	4	s	Canada; Laurent Dubreuil; Anders Johnson; Connor Howe	1:21.09	+1.82
5	1	c	Spain; Jhoan Sebastian Guzman; Nil Llop; Daniel Milagros	1:22.09	+2.82
6	2	c	Norway; Pål Myhren Kristensen; Henrik Fagerli Rukke; Bjørn Magnussen	1:22.54	+3.27
7	2	s	Hungary; Lukács Soma; Botond Bejczi; Bálint Bödei	1:24.82	+5.55
8	5	s	Netherlands; Mats van den Bos; Stefan Westenbroek; Serge Yoro	1:38.67	+19.40
	4	c	Poland; Marek Kania; Piotr Michalski; Damian Żurek	Did not finish	

=== Women's events ===
==== 1st 500 m ====
The race started on 21 February 2025 at 18:30.

Rank	Pair	Lane	Name	Country	Time	Diff
1st place, gold medalist(s)	8	o	Erin Jackson	United States	38.08	
2nd place, silver medalist(s)	10	o	Suzanne Schulting	Netherlands	38.17	+0.09
3rd place, bronze medalist(s)	7	i	Kaja Ziomek-Nogal	Poland	38.31	+0.23
4	9	i	Andżelika Wójcik	Poland	38.34	+0.26
5	8	i	Yukino Yoshida	Japan	38.35	+0.27
6	5	o	Kristina Silaeva	Kazakhstan	38.36	+0.28
7	4	i	Serena Pergher	Italy	38.38	+0.30
8	6	o	Naomi Verkerk	Netherlands	38.51	+0.43
9	5	i	Carolina Hiller	Canada	38.52	+0.44
10	10	i	Kurumi Inagawa	Japan	38.57	+0.49
11	3	i	Karolina Bosiek	Poland	38.57	+0.49
12	6	i	Kim Min-sun	South Korea	38.62	+0.54
13	9	o	Dione Voskamp	Netherlands	38.68	+0.60
14	4	o	Tian Ruining	China	38.72	+0.64
15	2	o	Wang Jingziqian	China	38.82	+0.74
16	2	i	Sophie Warmuth	Germany	38.85	+0.77
17	7	o	Vanessa Herzog	Austria	38.91	+0.83
18	3	o	Julie Nistad Samsonsen	Norway	38.98	+0.90
19	1	o	Xu Meng	China	39.36	+1.28
20	1	i	Giorgia Aiello	Italy	39.43	+1.35

==== 2nd 500 m ====
The race started on 23 February 2025 at 14:30.

Rank	Pair	Lane	Name	Country	Time	Diff
1st place, gold medalist(s)	10	o	Erin Jackson	United States	37.81	
2nd place, silver medalist(s)	9	o	Suzanne Schulting	Netherlands	37.92	+0.11
3rd place, bronze medalist(s)	10	i	Andżelika Wójcik	Poland	38.06	+0.25
4	2	o	Lee Na-hyun	South Korea	38.15	+0.34
5	8	o	Kurumi Inagawa	Japan	38.19	+0.38
6	6	i	Kim Min-sun	South Korea	38.22	+0.41
7	7	i	Kaja Ziomek-Nogal	Poland	38.32	+0.51
8	9	i	Yukino Yoshida	Japan	38.33	+0.52
9	4	o	Tian Ruining	China	38.36	+0.55
10	7	o	Naomi Verkerk	Netherlands	38.39	+0.58
11	5	o	Kristina Silaeva	Kazakhstan	38.41	+0.60
12	4	i	Serena Pergher	Italy	38.44	+0.63
13	1	o	Rio Yamada	Japan	38.47	+0.66
14	6	o	Carolina Hiller	Canada	38.55	+0.74
15	3	i	Karolina Bosiek	Poland	38.62	+0.81
16	8	i	Dione Voskamp	Netherlands	38.78	+0.97
17	5	i	Vanessa Herzog	Austria	38.84	+1.03
18	3	o	Julie Nistad Samsonsen	Norway	38.96	+1.15
19	1	i	Chen Ying-Chu	Chinese Taipei	39.04	+1.23
20	2	i	Sophie Warmuth	Germany	39.28	+1.47

==== 1000 m ====
The race started on 22 February 2025 at 16:44.

Rank	Pair	Lane	Name	Country	Time	Diff
1st place, gold medalist(s)	10	i	Miho Takagi	Japan	1:14.80	
2nd place, silver medalist(s)	9	o	Han Mei	China	1:16.31	+1.51
3rd place, bronze medalist(s)	4	o	Rio Yamada	Japan	1:16.33	+1.53
4	10	o	Suzanne Schulting	Netherlands	1:16.36	+1.56
5	8	o	Brittany Bowe	United States	1:16.60	+1.80
6	1	i	Nikola Zdráhalová	Czech Republic	1:17.06	+2.26
7	5	i	Karolina Bosiek	Poland	1:17.10	+2.30
8	6	i	Andżelika Wójcik	Poland	1:17.36	+2.56
9	8	i	Natalia Jabrzyk	Poland	1:17.52	+2.72
10	3	o	Isabelle van Elst	Belgium	1:17.53	+2.73
11	9	i	Ayano Sato	Japan	1:17.55	+2.75
12	2	i	Anna Ostlender	Germany	1:17.59	+2.79
13	7	i	Marrit Fledderus	Netherlands	1:17.60	+2.80
14	1	o	Isabel Grevelt	Netherlands	1:17.80	+3.00
15	4	i	Nadezhda Morozova	Kazakhstan	1:17.97	+3.17
16	3	i	Kim Min-sun	South Korea	1:18.04	+3.24
17	6	o	Vanessa Herzog	Austria	1:18.13	+3.33
18	5	o	Lea Sophie Scholz	Germany	1:18.21	+3.41
19	7	o	Béatrice Lamarche	Canada	1:18.33	+3.53
20	2	o	Greta Myers	United States	1:18.88	+4.08

==== 1500 m ====
The race started on 21 February 2025 at 19:37.

Rank	Pair	Lane	Name	Country	Time	Diff
1st place, gold medalist(s)	8	i	Marijke Groenewoud	Netherlands	1:56.67	
2nd place, silver medalist(s)	10	o	Miho Takagi	Japan	1:57.50	+0.83
3rd place, bronze medalist(s)	7	i	Han Mei	China	1:57.56	+0.89
4	8	o	Ragne Wiklund	Norway	1:58.22	+1.55
5	6	i	Valérie Maltais	Canada	1:58.57	+1.90
6	7	o	Yang Binyu	China	1:58.63	+1.96
7	2	o	Natalia Jabrzyk	Poland	1:59.01	+2.34
8	6	o	Isabelle van Elst	Belgium	1:59.24	+2.57
9	9	o	Ivanie Blondin	Canada	1:59.27	+2.60
10	9	i	Francesca Lollobrigida	Italy	1:59.53	+2.86
11	10	i	Brittany Bowe	United States	1:59.73	+3.06
12	5	o	Melissa Wijfje	Netherlands	1:59.75	+3.08
13	5	i	Greta Myers	United States	2:00.16	+3.49
14	4	o	Momoka Horikawa	Japan	2:00.18	+3.51
15	3	o	Mia Manganello	United States	2:00.42	+3.75
16	3	i	Ayano Sato	Japan	2:00.44	+3.77
17	1	i	Arianna Fontana	Italy	2:00.58	+3.91
18	4	i	Martina Sáblíková	Czech Republic	2:00.79	+4.12
19	2	i	Kaitlyn McGregor	Switzerland	2:01.40	+4.73
20	1	o	Marlen Ehseluns	Germany	2:05.03	+8.36

==== 3000 m ====
The race started on 22 February 2025 at 14:30.

Rank	Pair	Lane	Name	Country	Time	Diff
1st place, gold medalist(s)	7	i	Ragne Wiklund	Norway	4:03.70	
2nd place, silver medalist(s)	8	o	Merel Conijn	Netherlands	4:04.59	+0.89
3rd place, bronze medalist(s)	8	i	Francesca Lollobrigida	Italy	4:05.32	+1.62
4	5	i	Marijke Groenewoud	Netherlands	4:05.96	+2.26
5	7	o	Martina Sáblíková	Czech Republic	4:07.72	+4.02
6	3	i	Yang Binyu	China	4:08.37	+4.67
7	6	i	Isabelle Weidemann	Canada	4:08.46	+4.76
8	2	o	Nikola Zdráhalová	Czech Republic	4:08.48	+4.78
9	4	o	Momoka Horikawa	Japan	4:08.90	+5.20
10	2	i	Josie Hofmann	Germany	4:09.88	+6.18
11	4	i	Sanne In 't Hof	Netherlands	4:10.11	+6.41
12	5	o	Valérie Maltais	Canada	4:10.67	+6.97
13	6	o	Ivanie Blondin	Canada	4:11.79	+8.09
14	3	o	Sandrine Tas	Belgium	4:15.65	+11.95
15	1	i	Mia Manganello	United States	4:15.81	+12.11
16	1	o	Melissa Wijfje	Netherlands	4:18.06	+14.36

==== Mass start ====
The race started on 23 February 2025 at 15:41.

Rank	Name	Country	Points	Time
1st place, gold medalist(s)	Marijke Groenewoud	Netherlands	61	8:20.34
2nd place, silver medalist(s)	Francesca Lollobrigida	Italy	40	8:20.48
3rd place, bronze medalist(s)	Ivanie Blondin	Canada	20	8:20.79
4	Mia Manganello	United States	10	8:21.03
5	Yang Binyu	China	6	8:21.03
6	Ayano Sato	Japan	3	8:21.25
7	Jin Wenjing	China	3	8:24.47
8	Kaitlyn McGregor	Switzerland	3	8:25.29
9	Fran Vanhoutte	Belgium	3	8:32.25
10	Josie Hofmann	Germany	2	8:23.77
11	Elisa Dul	Netherlands	2	8:24.76
12	Ramona Härdi	Switzerland	2	8:27.71
13	Momoka Horikawa	Japan	1	8:23.85
14	Natalia Jabrzyk	Poland	1	8:24.73
15	Valérie Maltais	Canada		8:21.67
16	Michelle Uhrig	Germany		8:23.97
17	Greta Myers	United States		8:24.12
18	Hanna Svenni	Norway		8:24.70
19	Sandrine Tas	Belgium		8:25.55
20	Alice Marletti	Italy		8:33.99

==== Team sprint ====
The race started on 23 February 2025 at 16:30.

Rank	Pair	Lane	Country	Time	Diff
1st place, gold medalist(s)	3	c	Poland; Andżelika Wójcik; Kaja Ziomek-Nogal; Karolina Bosiek	1:28.07	
2nd place, silver medalist(s)	4	s	Canada; Carolina Hiller; Béatrice Lamarche; Ivanie Blondin	1:28.30	+0.23
3rd place, bronze medalist(s)	2	c	Netherlands; Dione Voskamp; Naomi Verkerk; Suzanne Schulting	1:28.46	+0.39
4	4	c	Germany; Lea Sophie Scholz; Sophie Warmuth; Anna Ostlender	1:29.81	+1.74
5	3	s	Kazakhstan; Darja Vazhenina; Kristina Silaeva; Nadezhda Morozova	1:30.99	+2.92
6	1	s	United States; McKenzie Browne; Sarah Warren; Chrysta Rands-Evans	1:32.19	+4.12
7	2	s	Norway; Carina Jagtøyen; Julie Nistad Samsonsen; Aurora Grinden Løvås	1:32.78	+4.71
8	1	c	China; Tian Ruining; Yu Shihui; Wang Jingziqian	1:36.40	+8.33
