= 2025 Four Continents Speed Skating Championships =

Speed-skating competition

- Venue: YS Arena, Hachinohe, Japan
- Dates: 15–17 November 2024

The 2025 Four Continents Speed Skating Championships were held from 15 to 17 November 2024 at the YS Arena in Hachinohe, Japan.

== Medal summary ==
=== Medal table ===
* Host nation (Japan)

Rank	Nation	Gold	Silver	Bronze	Total
1	United States	7	1	1	9
2	Canada	3	3	6	12
3	Japan*	2	5	3	10
4	China	1	3	0	4
5	Kazakhstan	1	1	1	3
6	South Korea	0	1	3	4
Totals (6 entries)		14	14	14	42

=== Men's events ===
Event	Gold		Silver		Bronze	
500 m	Jordan Stolz; United States	34.47	Laurent Dubreuil; Canada	34.68	Tatsuya Shinhama; Japan	34.82
1000 m	Jordan Stolz; United States	1:08.04 TR	Tatsuya Shinhama; Japan	1:08.38	Laurent Dubreuil; Canada	1:09.04
1500 m	Jordan Stolz; United States	1:44.45 TR	Ning Zhongyan; China	1:45.84	Taiyo Nonomura; Japan	1:46.01
5000 m	Graeme Fish; Canada	6:18.06 TR	Riku Tsuchiya; Japan	6:23.40	Seitaro Ichinohe; Japan	6:24.11
Mass start	Vitaliy Chshigolev; Kazakhstan	62 pts	David La Rue; Canada	45 pts	Hayden Mayeur; Canada	22 pts
Team sprint	United States; Austin Kleba; Cooper McLeod; Zach Stoppelmoor	1:19.43	China; Deng Zhihan; Lian Ziwen; Liu Bin	1:19.78	Canada; Laurent Dubreuil; Anders Johnson; Yankun Zhao	1:20.32
Team pursuit	United States; Ethan Cepuran; Emery Lehman; Jordan Stolz	3:43.13	Japan; Seitaro Ichinohe; Shomu Sasaki; Riku Tsuchiya	3:44.47	Canada; Ted-Jan Bloemen; Connor Howe; Hayden Mayeur	3:47.43

=== Women's events ===
Event	Gold		Silver		Bronze	
500 m	Erin Jackson; United States	38.16	Kurumi Inagawa; Japan	38.26	Kim Min-sun; South Korea	38.30
1000 m	Brittany Bowe; United States	1:15.65	Nadezhda Morozova; Kazakhstan	1:17.16	Kimi Goetz; United States	1:17.23
1500 m	Miho Takagi; Japan	1:54.86	Han Mei; China	1:56.53	Ivanie Blondin; Canada	1:57.99
3000 m	Momoka Horikawa; Japan	4:06.91	Isabelle Weidemann; Canada	4:08.03	Ivanie Blondin; Canada	4:08.09
Mass start	Ivanie Blondin; Canada	63 pts	Mia Manganello; United States	41 pts	Park Ji-woo; South Korea	20 pts
Team sprint	Canada; Ivanie Blondin; Carolina Hiller; Béatrice Lamarche	1:27.87	South Korea; Kim Min-ji; Kim Min-sun; Lee Na-hyun	1:29.26	Kazakhstan; Nadezhda Morozova; Kristina Silaeva; Darja Vazhenina	1:30.36
Team pursuit	China; Ahenaer Adake; Jin Wenjing; Yang Binyu	3:02.20	Japan; Rin Kosaka; Hana Noake; Yuka Takahashi	3:04.02	South Korea; Kim Yoon-ji; Jeong Yu-na; Park Ji-woo	3:12.28
