= Carolina Hiller =

Canadian speed skater (born 1997)

Carolina Hiller-Donnelly
Personal information
- Born: 7 May 1997 (age 29) Prince George, British Columbia, Canada
- Height: 170 cm (5 ft 7 in)

Sport
- Sport: Speed skating
- Club: Prince George Blizzard
- Coached by: Kevin Crockett
Medal record
Women's speed skating
Representing Canada
World Single Distances Championships
Gold medal – first place	2023 Heerenveen	Team sprint
Gold medal – first place	2024 Calgary	Team sprint
Four Continents Championships
Gold medal – first place	2025 Hachinohe	Team sprint
Bronze medal – third place	2022 Calgary	Team sprint
Bronze medal – third place	2024 Salt Lake City	Team sprint

Carolina Hiller-Donnelly (born May 7, 1997) is a Canadian speed skater. She is a two-time gold medallist at the World Single Distances Speed Skating Championships.

== Career ==
Hiller made her World Single Distances Speed Skating Championships debut at the 2023 World Single Distances Speed Skating Championships and won a gold medal in the team sprint event, along with Ivanie Blondin and Brooklyn McDougall, with a time of 1:26.29. She again competed at the World Single Distances Championships in 2024 and won a gold medal in the team sprint event, along with Blondin and Maddison Pearman, with a time of 1:25.14.

In November 2024, she competed at the 2025 Four Continents Speed Skating Championships and won a gold medal in the team sprint event, along with Blondin and Béatrice Lamarche, with a time of 1:27.87. In January 2025, during World Cup #3 of the 2024–25 ISU Speed Skating World Cup, she won a gold medal in the team sprint with a Canadian record time of 1:24.90.

== Personal life ==
Hiller's mother, Ariadne Holness de Hiller, died of uterine cancer on March 31, 2025. She has an older brother Lucas, and a twin brother, Nico, and her father is Bruce Hiller.
