= Rose Laliberté-Roy =

Canadian speed skater (born 1998)

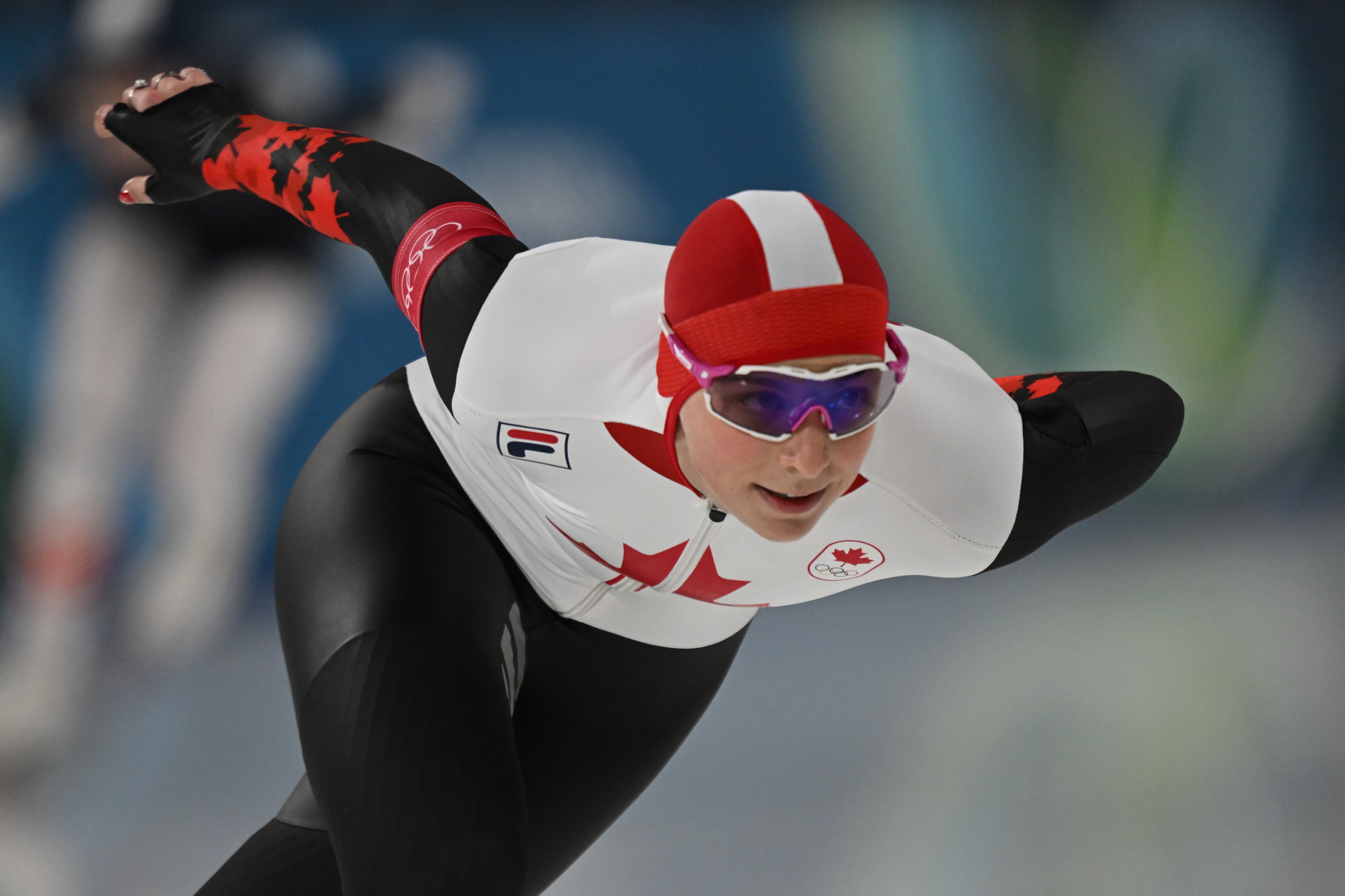

Personal information
- Born: December 12, 1998 (age 27) Lévis, Quebec, Canada

Sport
- Country: Canada
- Sport: Speed skating
- Events: 500 m, 1000 m
Medal record
Women's speed skating
Representing Canada
Four Continents Championships
Bronze medal – third place	2023 Quebec City	Team sprint

Rose Laliberté-Roy (born December 12, 1998) is a Canadian speed skater. She competes primarily in the short distances of 500 m and 1000 m.

== Career ==
Laliberté-Roy's first major competition was the 2019 Canada Winter Games in Red Deer, Alberta, where Laliberté-Roy won two medals. At the 2023 Four Continents Speed Skating Championships in Quebec City, Laliberté-Roy won bronze as part of the women's team sprint event.

At the 2026 Canadian Olympic trials, Laliberté-Roy won the 1,000 metres event and in the process qualifying for the 2026 Winter Olympics.

At the 2026 Canadian Long Track Championships in Quebec City in October, Laliberté-Roy finished second in the 500 metres behind Béatrice Lamarche, then won the 1000 metres in 1:18.372 ahead of Julia Snelgrove and Skylar Van Horne, claiming the first national title of her career.
