= Um Cheon-ho =

South Korean speed skater

Um Cheon-Ho
Personal information
- Nationality: South Korean
- Born: 25 February 1992 (age 34)

Sport
- Country: South Korea
- Sport: Speed skating
- Club: Korea National Sport University
Medal record
Representing South Korea
Men's speed skating
World Single Distances Championships
Silver medal – second place	2019 Inzell	Mass start
Four Continents Championships
Gold medal – first place	2020 Milwaukee	Mass start
Gold medal – first place	2022 Calgary	Mass start
Gold medal – first place	2023 Quebec	Team pursuit
Silver medal – second place	2020 Milwaukee	Team pursuit
Bronze medal – third place	2022 Calgary	Team pursuit
Men's short track speed skating
World Team Championships
Gold medal – first place	2011 Warsaw	Team
Asian Winter Games
Gold medal – first place	2011 Astana-Almaty	5000 m relay
Silver medal – second place	2011 Astana-Almaty	1500 m
Winter Universiade
Silver medal – second place	2013 Trentino	1000 m
Silver medal – second place	2013 Trentino	1500 m
World Junior Championships
Gold medal – first place	2009 Sherbrooke	Overall

Um Cheon-Ho (Korean: 엄천호; Hanja: 嚴天顥; born 25 February 1992) is a South Korean short track speed skater. He competed for South Korea at the 2011 Asian Winter Games.
