= Austin Kleba =

American speed skater

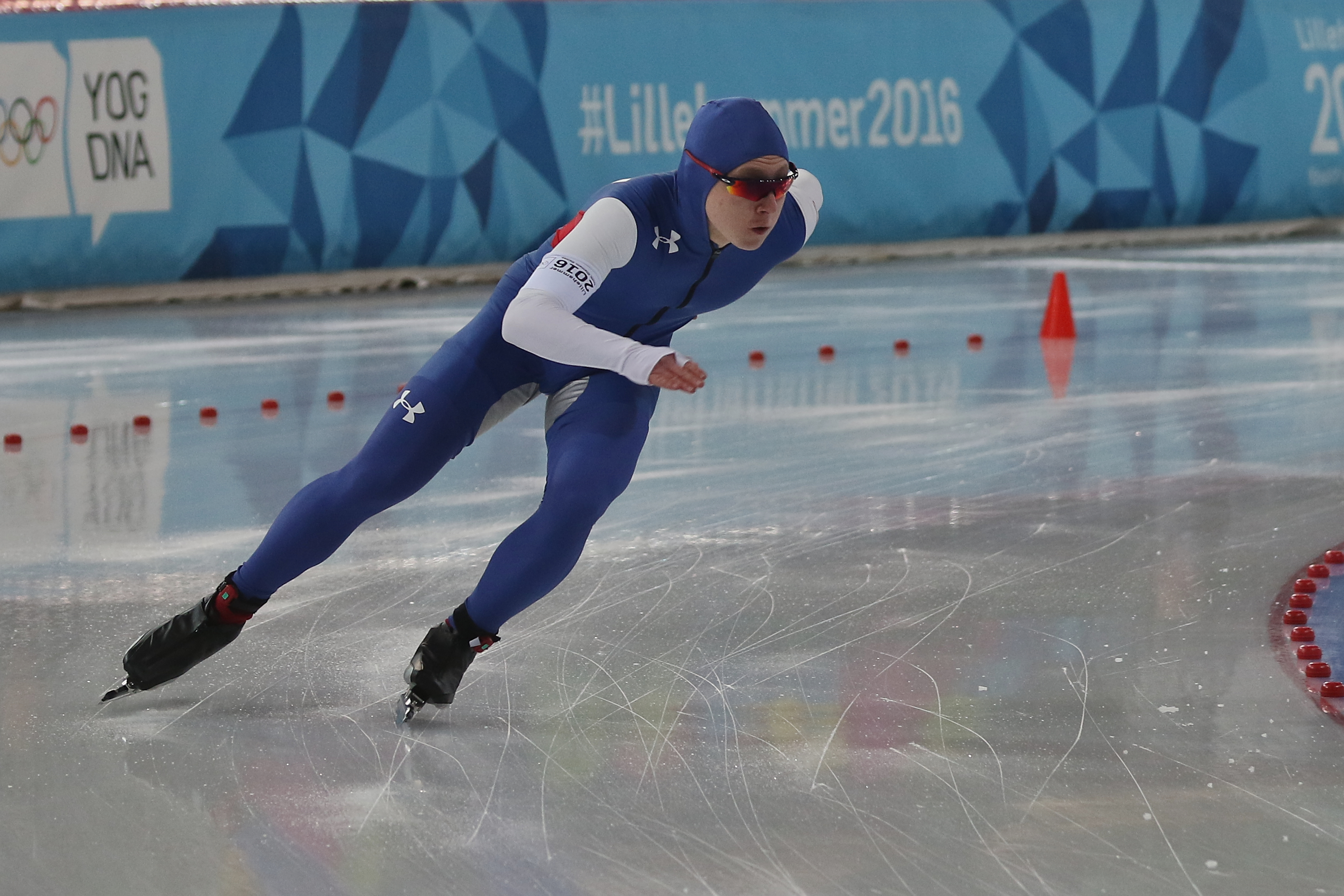
- Kleba in 2016

Personal information
- Born: July 27, 1999 (age 26) Campton Hills, Illinois, U.S.
- Height: 5 ft 6 in (168 cm)

Sport
- Country: United States
- Sport: Speed skating
- Event(s): 500 m, 1000 m
Medal record
Men's Speed skating
Representing the United States
World Single Distances Championships
Bronze medal – third place	2025 Hamar	Team sprint
Four Continents Championships
Gold medal – first place	2022 Calgary	500 m
Gold medal – first place	2022 Calgary	Team sprint
Gold medal – first place	2025 Hachinohe	Team sprint
Silver medal – second place	2022 Calgary	1000 m

Austin Kleba (born July 27, 1999) is an American speed skater who represented the United States at the 2022 Winter Olympics.

== Career ==
Kleba represented the United States at the 2016 Winter Youth Olympics, where he won a silver medal in the mixed team sprint. He competed at the 2022 Four Continents Speed Skating Championships and won gold in the 500 metre, team sprint, and a silver medal in the 1000 metre. He represented the United States at the 2022 Winter Olympics.

In November 2024, Kleba competed at the 2025 Four Continents Speed Skating Championships and won gold medal in team sprint, along with Cooper McLeod and Zach Stoppelmoor.

During World Cup #3 on January 26, 2025, he set a world record in the team sprint with a time of 1:16.98, becoming the first men's sprint team to break 1:17. In March 2025, he competed at the 2025 World Single Distances Speed Skating Championships and won a bronze medal in the team sprint.

== World Cup overview ==
Key

Category
Senior level
Junior level

Season	Location	Team sprint*
2019–2020	(Belarus) Minsk	11th
2019–2020	(Poland) Tomaszów Mazowiecki	12th
2019–2020	(Kazakhstan) Astana	8th
2019–2020	(Japan) Nagano	12th
2022–2023	(Netherlands) Heerenveen	3rd place, bronze medalist(s)
2022–2023	(Canada) Calgary	6th
2022–2023	(Poland) Tomaszów Mazowiecki	5th
2023–2024	(China) Beijing	1st place, gold medalist(s)
2023–2024	(Norway) Stavanger	2nd place, silver medalist(s)
2023–2024	(Canada) Quebec	3rd place, bronze medalist(s)
2024–2025	(China) Beijing	2nd place, silver medalist(s)
2024–2025	(Canada) Calgary	1st place, gold medalist(s)

Season	Location	500 meter
2017–2018	(United States) Salt Lake City	11th
2018–2019	(Italy) Baselga di Pinè	DQ
2022–2023	(Poland) Tomaszów Mazowiecki	15th

Season	Location	1000 meter
2017–2018	(United States) Salt Lake City	14th
2018–2019	(Italy) Baselga di Pinè	1st place, gold medalist(s)
