= Chung Jae-won =

South Korean speed skater (born 2001)

Personal information
- Nationality: South Korean
- Born: 21 June 2001 (age 25) Seoul, South Korea
- Height: 1.74 m (5 ft 9 in)
- Weight: 61 kg (134 lb)

Korean name
- Hangul: 정재원
- RR: Jeong Jaewon
- MR: Chŏng Chaewŏn

Sport
- Country: South Korea
- Sport: Speed skating
- Event: Mass start
- Club: Dongbuk High School
Medal record
Olympic Games
Silver medal – second place	2018 Pyeongchang	Team pursuit
Silver medal – second place	2022 Beijing	Mass start
World Single Distances Championships
Bronze medal – third place	2019 Inzell	Mass start
Four Continents Championships
Gold medal – first place	2023 Quebec	Mass start
Gold medal – first place	2023 Quebec	Team pursuit
Gold medal – first place	2024 Salt Lake City	Mass start
Silver medal – second place	2020 Milwaukee	Mass start
Silver medal – second place	2020 Milwaukee	Team pursuit
Asian Winter Games
Silver medal – second place	2025 Harbin	Team pursuit

Chung Jae-won (Korean: 정재원; born 21 June 2001) is a South Korean speed skater. He competed in the 2018 Winter Olympics and won a silver medal in the team pursuit event. As a result, Chung became the youngest Korean speed skater to win a medal at the Olympics.
