= 2024 Four Continents Speed Skating Championships =

Speed-skating competition

- Venue: Utah Olympic Oval, Salt Lake City, United States
- Dates: 19–21 January 2024

The 2024 Four Continents Speed Skating Championships were held from 19 to 21 January 2024 at the Utah Olympic Oval in Salt Lake City, United States.

== Medal summary ==
=== Medal table ===
* Host nation (United States)

Rank	Nation	Gold	Silver	Bronze	Total
1	Canada	6	3	3	12
2	United States*	4	6	3	13
3	Japan	3	4	5	12
4	South Korea	1	0	3	4
5	Kazakhstan	0	1	0	1
Totals (5 entries)		14	14	14	42

=== Men's events ===
Event	Gold		Silver		Bronze	
500 m	Laurent Dubreuil; Canada	34.19	Wataru Morishige; Japan	34.23	Tatsuya Shinhama; Japan	34.28
1000 m	Jordan Stolz; United States	1:06.27	Taiyo Nonomura; Japan	1:06.68	Tatsuya Shinhama; Japan	1:07.04
1500 m	Connor Howe; Canada	1:43.19	Emery Lehman; United States	1:44.03	Ryota Kojima; Japan	1:44.40
5000 m	Casey Dawson; United States	6:14.14	Graeme Fish; Canada	6:14.16	Ted-Jan Bloemen; Canada	6:14.22
Team pursuit	United States; Ethan Cepuran; Casey Dawson; Emery Lehman	3:36.80	Canada; Antoine Gélinas-Beaulieu; Connor Howe; Hayden Mayeur	3:36.84	Japan; Seitaro Ichinohe; Shomu Sasaki; Riku Tsuchiya	3:42.08
Team sprint	Canada; Laurent Dubreuil; Antoine Gélinas-Beaulieu; Anders Johnson	1:18.54	Kazakhstan; Artur Galiyev; Nikita Vazhenin; Altaj Zjardembekuly	1:21.71	South Korea; Cho Sang-hyeok; Kim Tae-yun; Yang Ho-jun	1:22.01
Mass start	Chung Jae-won; South Korea	60 pts	Shomu Sasaki; Japan	40 pts	Antoine Gélinas-Beaulieu; Canada	20 pts

=== Women's events ===
Event	Gold		Silver		Bronze	
500 m	Erin Jackson; United States	36.82	Kimi Goetz; United States	36.93	Kim Min-sun; South Korea	37.21
1000 m	Miho Takagi; Japan	1:12.35	Kimi Goetz; United States	1:12.65	Kim Min-sun; South Korea	1:13.84
1500 m	Miho Takagi; Japan	1:52.37	Mia Manganello; United States	1:55.11	Greta Myers; United States	1:55.86
3000 m	Valérie Maltais; Canada	4:01.71	Isabelle Weidemann; Canada	4:02.67	Mia Manganello; United States	4:02.85
Team pursuit	Canada; Ivanie Blondin; Valérie Maltais; Isabelle Weidemann	2:54.02	Japan; Momoka Horikawa; Sumire Kikuchi; Yuna Onodera	2:57.54	United States; Giorgia Birkeland; Greta Myers; Anna Quinn	3:04.32
Team sprint	Japan; Kurumi Inagawa; Ayano Sato; Miho Takagi	1:24.32	United States; Brittany Bowe; Erin Jackson; Sarah Warren	1:25.00	Canada; Ivanie Blondin; Carolina Hiller; Maddison Pearman	1:25.41
Mass start	Ivanie Blondin; Canada	66 pts	Giorgia Birkeland; United States	43 pts	Kyoko Nitta; Japan	26 pts
