= Wang Hongli =

Chinese speed skater

Personal information
- Nationality: Chinese
- Born: 31 August 1997 (age 28)
- Height: 1.75 m (5 ft 9 in)
- Weight: 60 kg (132 lb)

Sport
- Sport: Speed skating
Medal record
Men's speed skating
Representing China
Four Continents Championships
Bronze medal – third place	2023 Quebec	Team pursuit

Wang Hongli (born 31 August 1997) is a Chinese speed skater. He competed in the 2018 Winter Olympics.
