= 2020 Four Continents Speed Skating Championships =

Speed-skating competition

- Venue: Pettit National Ice Center, Milwaukee, United States
- Dates: January 31 – February 2, 2020
- Competitors: 75 from 9 nations

The 2020 Four Continents Speed Skating Championships were the first edition of the championship and held from January 31 to February 2, 2020, at the Pettit National Ice Center in Milwaukee, United States.

== Schedule ==
All times are local (UTC–6).

Date	Time	Events
January 31	14:30	500 m women 500 m men 3000 m women 5000 m men Team sprint women Team sprint men
February 1	13:00	1500 m women 1500 m men Mass start women Mass start men
February 2	13:00	1000 m women 1000 m men Team pursuit women Team pursuit men

== Medal summary ==
=== Medal table ===
* Host nation (United States)

Rank	Nation	Gold	Silver	Bronze	Total
1	South Korea	5	4	4	13
2	United States*	5	0	3	8
3	Canada	2	5	1	8
4	Kazakhstan	1	3	3	7
5	Japan	1	1	1	3
6	China	0	1	2	3
Totals (6 entries)		14	14	14	42

=== Men's events ===
Event	Gold		Silver		Bronze	
500 m	Kim Jun-ho; South Korea	34.59 TR	Alex Boisvert-Lacroix; Canada	34.73	Roman Krech; Kazakhstan	34.94
1000 m	Koki Kubo; Japan	1:08.54	Laurent Dubreuil; Canada	1:08.54	Kim Jin-su; South Korea	1:08.84
1500 m	Kim Min-seok; South Korea	1:44.56	Jess Neufeld; Canada	1:45.99	Jake Weidemann; Canada	1:46.49
5000 m	Vitaliy Schigolev; Kazakhstan	6:19.33	Dmitry Morozov; Kazakhstan	6:19.48	Emery Lehman; United States	6:23.29
Team pursuit	Canada; Hayden Mayeur; Kaleb Muller; Jake Weidemann	3:44.36	South Korea; Chung Jae-won; Kim Min-seok; Um Cheon-ho	3:47.62	Kazakhstan; Demyan Gavrilov; Dmitry Morozov; Vitaliy Schigolev	3:47.90
Team sprint	South Korea; Cha Min-kyu; Kim Jin-su; Kim Jun-ho	1:21.08	China; Hou Kaibo; Wang Haotian; Xu Fu	1:21.35	Kazakhstan; Alexander Klenko; Roman Krech; Stanislav Palkin	1:21.41
Mass start	Um Cheon-ho; South Korea	64 pts	Chung Jae-won; South Korea	41 pts	Ian Quinn; United States	21 pts

=== Women's events ===
Event	Gold		Silver		Bronze	
500 m	Kim Min-sun; South Korea	38.41	Brooklyn McDougall; Canada	38.53	Kim Hyun-yung; South Korea	38.55
1000 m	Brianna Bocox; United States	1:15.53	Rio Yamada; Japan	1:16.02	Mia Kilburg; United States	1:16.04
1500 m	Brianna Bocox; United States	1:57.17	Nadezhda Morozova; Kazakhstan	1:57.89	Park Ji-woo; South Korea	1:58.44
3000 m	Mia Kilburg; United States	4:07.00	Nadezhda Morozova; Kazakhstan	4:07.80	Nana Takahashi; Japan	4:11.00
Team pursuit	United States; Brianna Bocox; Mia Kilburg; Paige Schwartzburg	3:02.55	Canada; Lindsey Kent; Maddison Pearman; Alexa Scott	3:08.60	China; Ahenaer Adake; Chen Xiangyu; Ma Yuhan	3:14.15
Team sprint	Canada; Noémie Fiset; Maddison Pearman; Brooklyn McDougall	1:29.82	South Korea; Kim Hyun-yung; Kim Min-ji; Kim Min-sun	1:30.70	China; Chen Xiangyu; Lin Xue; Zhang Lina	1:33.38
Mass start	Mia Kilburg; United States	65 pts	Kim Bo-reum; South Korea	40 pts	Park Ji-woo; South Korea	22 pts

== Participating nations ==
A total of 75 speed skaters from 9 nations contested the events. The numbers in parentheses represents the number of participants entered.

- Argentina (1)
- Australia (1)
- Canada (15)
- China (14)
- Japan (8)
- Kazakhstan (9)
- South Korea (13)
- Chinese Taipei (1)
- United States (13)
