= 2022 Four Continents Speed Skating Championships =

Speed-skating competition

- Venue: Olympic Oval, Calgary, Canada
- Dates: 15–17 December 2021
- Competitors: 60 from 9 nations

The 2022 Four Continents Speed Skating Championships were held from 15 to 17 December 2021 at the Olympic Oval in Calgary, Canada.

== Schedule ==
All times are local (UTC–7).

| Date | Time | Events |
|---|---|---|
| 15 December | 13:00 | 500 m women 500 m men 3000 m women 5000 m men Team sprint women Team sprint men |
| 16 December | 13:00 | 1500 m women 1500 m men Mass start women Mass start men |
| 17 December | 13:00 | 1000 m women 1000 m men Team pursuit women Team pursuit men |

== Medal summary ==
=== Medal table ===
* Host nation (Canada)

| Rank | Nation | Gold | Silver | Bronze | Total |
|---|---|---|---|---|---|
| 1 | United States | 5 | 3 | 3 | 11 |
| 2 | Canada* | 3 | 5 | 2 | 10 |
| 3 | Kazakhstan | 3 | 2 | 2 | 7 |
| 4 | South Korea | 2 | 3 | 4 | 9 |
| 5 | Chinese Taipei | 1 | 1 | 1 | 3 |
| 6 | Argentina | 0 | 0 | 1 | 1 |
| Totals (6 entries) | | 14 | 14 | 13 | 41 |

=== Men's events ===
| Event | Gold | | Silver | | Bronze | |
|---|---|---|---|---|---|---|
| 500 m | Austin Kleba; United States | 34.82 | Cha Min-kyu; South Korea | 34.83 | Yevgeniy Koshkin; Kazakhstan | 34.90 |
| 1000 m | Denis Kuzin; Kazakhstan | 1:08.63 | Austin Kleba; United States | 1:08.75 | Tai Wei-lin; Chinese Taipei | 1:09.19 |
| 1500 m | Dmitry Morozov; Kazakhstan | 1:45.32 | Ted-Jan Bloemen; Canada | 1:45.65 | Kim Min-seok; South Korea | 1:46.47 |
| 5000 m | Ted-Jan Bloemen; Canada | 6:12.38 | Kaleb Muller; Canada | 6:23.03 | Bakdaulet Sagatov; Kazakhstan | 6:31.77 |
| Team pursuit | Canada; Ted-Jan Bloemen; Hayden Mayeur; Kaleb Muller | 3:37.22 | Kazakhstan; Vitaliy Chshigolev; Demyan Gavrilov; Bakdaulet Sagatov | 3:51.60 | South Korea; Chung Yang-hun; Park Seong-hyeon; Um Cheon-ho | 3:54.37 |
| Team sprint | United States; Austin Kleba; Brett Perry; Zach Stoppelmoor | 1:20.59 | South Korea; Cha Min-kyu; Jeong Seon-kyo; Park Seong-hyeon | 1:22.12 | Not awarded | |
| Mass start | Um Cheon-ho; South Korea | 60 pts | Hayden Mayeur; Canada | 43 pts | Zach Stoppelmoor; United States | 20 pts |

=== Women's events ===
| Event | Gold | | Silver | | Bronze | |
|---|---|---|---|---|---|---|
| 500 m | Yekaterina Aidova; Kazakhstan | 37.90 | Huang Yu-ting; Chinese Taipei | 38.06 | María Victoria Rodríguez; Argentina | 38.53 |
| 1000 m | Huang Yu-ting; Chinese Taipei | 1:14.45 | Yekaterina Aidova; Kazakhstan | 1:15.49 | Kali Christ; Canada | 1:16.50 |
| 1500 m | Kali Christ; Canada | 1:57.67 | Sarah Warren; United States | 2:00.41 | Jamie Jurak; United States | 2:01.89 |
| 3000 m | Jamie Jurak; United States | 4:15.46 | Laura Hall; Canada | 4:20.68 | Park Chae-won; South Korea | 4:20.73 |
| Team pursuit | United States; Giorgia Birkeland; Jamie Jurak; Dessie Weigel | 3:08.18 | Canada; Kali Christ; Laura Hall; Lindsey Kent | 3:08.69 | South Korea; Kim Min-ji; Park Chae-eun; Park Chae-won | 3:30.61 |
| Team sprint | United States; McKenzie Browne; Chrysta Rands; Sarah Warren | 1:30.47 | South Korea; Kim Min-ji; Lee Na-hyun; Park Chae-eun | 1:32.12 | Canada; Kali Christ; Carolina Hiller; Lindsey Kent | 1:46.26 |
| Mass start | Park Chae-won; South Korea | 60 pts | Jamie Jurak; United States | 45 pts | Dessie Weigel; United States | 23 pts |

== Participating nations ==
A total of 60 speed skaters from 9 nations contested the events. The numbers in parentheses represents the number of participants entered.

- Argentina (1)
- Australia (1)
- Canada (13)
- Colombia (4)
- Kazakhstan (11)
- Mongolia (1)
- South Korea (14)
- Chinese Taipei (2)
- United States (13)
