= 2023 World Single Distances Speed Skating Championships =

- Venue: Thialf, Heerenveen, Netherlands
- Dates: 2–5 March

The 2023 World Single Distances Speed Skating Championships were held from 2 to 5 March 2023, at Thialf in Heerenveen, Netherlands.

== Schedule ==
All times are local (UTC+1).

Date	Time	Events
2 March	18:20	3000 m women
2 March	19:35	5000 m men
2 March	21:25	Team sprint men
2 March	21:42	Team sprint women
3 March	19:05	Team pursuit women
3 March	19:30	Team pursuit men
3 March	20:14	500 m men
3 March	20:53	500 m women
4 March	13:36	Mass start semifinals men
4 March	14:22	Mass start semifinals women
4 March	15:13	1000 m men
4 March	15:57	1000 m women
4 March	16:58	Mass start final men
4 March	17:19	Mass start final women
5 March	12:45	1500 m men
5 March	13:45	1500 m women
5 March	14:46	10,000 m men
5 March	16:48	5000 m women

== Medal summary ==
=== Medal table ===
* Host nation (Netherlands)

Rank	Nation	Gold	Silver	Bronze	Total
1	Netherlands*	7	7	3	17
2	Canada	3	3	1	7
3	United States	3	1	1	5
4	Norway	1	2	2	5
5	Italy	1	1	1	3
6	Belgium	1	0	1	2
7	Japan	0	1	3	4
8	Austria	0	1	0	1
9	Czech Republic	0	0	2	2
10	China	0	0	1	1
10	Great Britain	0	0	1	1
Totals (11 entries)		16	16	16	48

=== Men's events ===
Event	Gold		Silver		Bronze	
500 m	Jordan Stolz; United States	34.10	Laurent Dubreuil; Canada	34.46	Wataru Morishige; Japan	34.48
1000 m	Jordan Stolz; United States	1:07.11	Thomas Krol; Netherlands	1:07.78	Cornelius Kersten; Great Britain	1:08.02
1500 m	Jordan Stolz; United States	1:43.59	Kjeld Nuis; Netherlands	1:43.82	Thomas Krol; Netherlands	1:44.30
5000 m	Patrick Roest; Netherlands	6:08.94	Davide Ghiotto; Italy	6:11.12	Bart Swings; Belgium	6:13.06
10000 m	Davide Ghiotto; Italy	12:41.35	Jorrit Bergsma; Netherlands	12:55.64	Ted-Jan Bloemen; Canada	13:01.84
Team sprint	Canada; Laurent Dubreuil; Christopher Fiola; Antoine Gélinas-Beaulieu	1:19.26	Netherlands; Wesly Dijs; Hein Otterspeer; Merijn Scheperkamp	1:19.67	Norway; Håvard Holmefjord Lorentzen; Bjørn Magnussen; Henrik Fagerli Rukke	1:19.80
Team pursuit	Netherlands; Marcel Bosker; Patrick Roest; Beau Snellink	3:38.26	Canada; Antoine Gélinas-Beaulieu; Connor Howe; Hayden Mayeur	3:38.43	Norway; Allan Dahl Johansson; Peder Kongshaug; Sverre Lunde Pedersen	3:40.93
Mass start	Bart Swings; Belgium	60 pts	Bart Hoolwerf; Netherlands	40 pts	Andrea Giovannini; Italy	23 pts

=== Women's events ===
Event	Gold		Silver		Bronze	
500 m	Femke Kok; Netherlands	37.28	Vanessa Herzog; Austria	37.33	Jutta Leerdam; Netherlands	37.54
1000 m	Jutta Leerdam; Netherlands	1:13.03	Antoinette Rijpma-de Jong; Netherlands	1:14.26	Miho Takagi; Japan	1:14.37
1500 m	Antoinette Rijpma-de Jong; Netherlands	1:53.54	Ragne Wiklund; Norway	1:54.30	Miho Takagi; Japan	1:54.39
3000 m	Ragne Wiklund; Norway	3:56.86	Irene Schouten; Netherlands	3:57.40	Martina Sáblíková; Czech Republic	3:58.35
5000 m	Irene Schouten; Netherlands	6:41.25	Ragne Wiklund; Norway	6:46.15	Martina Sáblíková; Czech Republic	6:47.78
Team sprint	Canada; Ivanie Blondin; Carolina Hiller; Brooklyn McDougall	1:26.29	United States; McKenzie Browne; Kimi Goetz; Erin Jackson	1:26.58	China; Jin Jingzhu; Li Qishi; Zhang Lina	1:27.86
Team pursuit	Canada; Ivanie Blondin; Valérie Maltais; Isabelle Weidemann	2:54.58	Japan; Momoka Horikawa; Sumire Kikuchi; Ayano Sato	2:57.30	United States; Giorgia Birkeland; Brittany Bowe; Mia Kilburg	3:00.39
Mass start	Marijke Groenewoud; Netherlands	66 pts	Ivanie Blondin; Canada	40 pts	Irene Schouten; Netherlands	22 pts
