= Four Continents Speed Skating Championships =

Annual speed-skating competition

Four Continents Speed Skating Championships is an annual speed skating competition. It was established by the International Skating Union in 2019 to allow athletes from outside Europe to compete at the event. Its inaugural event was held in 2020, while its second editions were cancelled in 2021 due to the COVID-19 pandemic.

== Editions ==
Year	Date	Location
2020	31 January – 2 February 2020	(United States) Milwaukee
2022	15–17 December 2021	(Canada) Calgary
2023	2–4 December 2022	(Canada) Quebec
2024	19–21 January 2024	(United States) Salt Lake City
2025	15–17 November 2024	(Japan) Hachinohe
~~2026~~	~~7–9 November 2025~~	(United States) Salt Lake City

== Medal holders ==
=== Men's events ===
==== 500 metres ====
Event	Gold	Silver	Bronze
2020	Kim Jun-ho; South Korea	Alex Boisvert-Lacroix; Canada	Roman Krech; Kazakhstan
2022	Austin Kleba; United States	Cha Min-kyu; South Korea	Yevgeniy Koshkin; Kazakhstan
2023	Laurent Dubreuil; Canada	Yuma Murakami; Japan	Kim Jun-ho; South Korea
2024	Laurent Dubreuil; Canada	Wataru Morishige; Japan	Tatsuya Shinhama; Japan
2025	Jordan Stolz; United States	Laurent Dubreuil; Canada	Tatsuya Shinhama; Japan

==== 1000 metres ====
Event	Gold	Silver	Bronze
2020	Koki Kubo; Japan	Laurent Dubreuil; Canada	Kim Jin-su; South Korea
2022	Denis Kuzin; Kazakhstan	Austin Kleba; United States	Tai Wei-lin; Chinese Taipei
2023	Laurent Dubreuil; Canada	Park Seong-hyeon; South Korea	Kim Tae-yun; South Korea
2024	Jordan Stolz; United States	Taiyo Nonomura; Japan	Tatsuya Shinhama; Japan
2025	Jordan Stolz; United States	Tatsuya Shinhama; Japan	Laurent Dubreuil; Canada

==== 1500 metres ====
Event	Gold	Silver	Bronze
2020	Kim Min-seok; South Korea	Jess Neufeld; Canada	Jake Weidemann; Canada
2022	Dmitry Morozov; Kazakhstan	Ted-Jan Bloemen; Canada	Kim Min-seok; South Korea
2023	Antoine Gélinas-Beaulieu; Canada	Dmitry Morozov; Kazakhstan	Jake Weidemann; Canada
2024	Connor Howe; Canada	Emery Lehman; United States	Ryota Kojima; Japan
2025	Jordan Stolz; United States	Ning Zhongyan; China	Taiyo Nonomura; Japan

==== 5000 metres ====
Event	Gold	Silver	Bronze
2020	Vitaliy Schigolev; Kazakhstan	Dmitry Morozov; Kazakhstan	Emery Lehman; United States
2022	Ted-Jan Bloemen; Canada	Kaleb Muller; Canada	Bakdaulet Sagatov; Kazakhstan
2023	Vitaliy Chshigolev; Kazakhstan	Lee Seung-hoon; South Korea	Jordan Belchos; Canada
2024	Casey Dawson; United States	Graeme Fish; Canada	Ted-Jan Bloemen; Canada
2025	Graeme Fish; Canada	Riku Tsuchiya; Japan	Seitaro Ichinohe; Japan

==== Mass start ====
Event	Gold	Silver	Bronze
2020	Um Cheon-ho; South Korea	Chung Jae-won; South Korea	Ian Quinn; United States
2022	Um Cheon-ho; South Korea	Hayden Mayeur; Canada	Zach Stoppelmoor; United States
2023	Chung Jae-won; South Korea	Lee Seung-hoon; South Korea	Shen Hanyang; China
2024	Chung Jae-won; South Korea	Shomu Sasaki; Japan	Antoine Gélinas-Beaulieu; Canada
2025	Vitaliy Chshigolev; Kazakhstan	David La Rue; Canada	Hayden Mayeur; Canada

==== Team pursuit ====
Event	Gold	Silver	Bronze
2020	Canada; Hayden Mayeur; Kaleb Muller; Jake Weidemann	South Korea; Chung Jae-won; Kim Min-seok; Um Cheon-ho	Kazakhstan; Demyan Gavrilov; Dmitry Morozov; Vitaliy Schigolev
2022	Canada; Ted-Jan Bloemen; Hayden Mayeur; Kaleb Muller	Kazakhstan; Vitaliy Chshigolev; Demyan Gavrilov; Bakdaulet Sagatov	South Korea; Chung Yang-hun; Park Seong-hyeon; Um Cheon-ho
2023	South Korea; Chung Jae-won; Um Cheon-ho; Yang Ho-jun	Canada; Jake Weidemann; Antoine Gélinas-Beaulieu; Max Halyk	China; Shen Hanyang; Wang Hongli; Wang Shiwei
2024	United States; Ethan Cepuran; Casey Dawson; Emery Lehman	Canada; Antoine Gélinas-Beaulieu; Connor Howe; Hayden Mayeur	Japan; Seitaro Ichinohe; Shomu Sasaki; Riku Tsuchiya
2025	United States; Ethan Cepuran; Emery Lehman; Jordan Stolz	Japan; Seitaro Ichinohe; Shomu Sasaki; Riku Tsuchiya	Canada; Ted-Jan Bloemen; Connor Howe; Hayden Mayeur

==== Team sprint ====
Event	Gold	Silver	Bronze
2020	South Korea; Cha Min-kyu; Kim Jin-su; Kim Jun-ho	China; Hou Kaibo; Wang Haotian; Xu Fu	Kazakhstan; Alexander Klenko; Roman Krech; Stanislav Palkin
2022	United States; Austin Kleba; Brett Perry; Zach Stoppelmoor	South Korea; Cha Min-kyu; Jeong Seon-kyo; Park Seong-hyeon	Not awarded
2023	Canada; Christopher Fiola; Laurent Dubreuil; David La Rue	South Korea; Kim Jun-ho; Kim Tae-yun; Park Seong-hyeon	United States; Tanner Worley; Zach Stoppelmoor; Conor McDermott-Mostowy
2024	Canada; Laurent Dubreuil; Antoine Gélinas-Beaulieu; Anders Johnson	Kazakhstan; Artur Galiyev; Nikita Vazhenin; Altaj Zjardembekuly	South Korea; Cho Sang-hyeok; Kim Tae-yun; Yang Ho-jun
2025	United States; Austin Kleba; Cooper McLeod; Zach Stoppelmoor	China; Deng Zhihan; Lian Ziwen; Liu Bin	Canada; Laurent Dubreuil; Anders Johnson; Yankun Zhao

=== Women's events ===
==== 500 metres ====
Event	Gold	Silver	Bronze
2020	Kim Min-sun; South Korea	Brooklyn McDougall; Canada	Kim Hyun-yung; South Korea
2022	Yekaterina Aidova; Kazakhstan	Huang Yu-ting; Chinese Taipei	María Victoria Rodríguez; Argentina
2023	Kim Min-sun; South Korea	Konami Soga; Japan	Yukino Yoshida; Japan
2024	Erin Jackson; United States	Kimi Goetz; United States	Kim Min-sun; South Korea
2025	Erin Jackson; United States	Kurumi Inagawa; Japan	Kim Min-sun; South Korea

==== 1000 metres ====
Event	Gold	Silver	Bronze
2020	Brianna Bocox; United States	Rio Yamada; Japan	Mia Kilburg; United States
2022	Huang Yu-ting; Chinese Taipei	Yekaterina Aidova; Kazakhstan	Kali Christ; Canada
2023	Kim Min-sun; South Korea	Yekaterina Aydova; Kazakhstan	Béatrice Lamarche; Canada
2024	Miho Takagi; Japan	Kimi Goetz; United States	Kim Min-sun; South Korea
2025	Brittany Bowe; United States	Nadezhda Morozova; Kazakhstan	Kimi Goetz; United States

==== 1500 metres ====
Event	Gold	Silver	Bronze
2020	Brianna Bocox; United States	Nadezhda Morozova; Kazakhstan	Park Ji-woo; South Korea
2022	Kali Christ; Canada	Sarah Warren; United States	Jamie Jurak; United States
2023	Nadezhda Morozova; Kazakhstan	Yekaterina Aydova; Kazakhstan	Alison Desmarais; Canada
2024	Miho Takagi; Japan	Mia Manganello; United States	Greta Myers; United States
2025	Miho Takagi; Japan	Han Mei; China	Ivanie Blondin; Canada

==== 3000 metres ====
Event	Gold	Silver	Bronze
2020	Mia Kilburg; United States	Nadezhda Morozova; Kazakhstan	Nana Takahashi; Japan
2022	Jamie Jurak; United States	Laura Hall; Canada	Park Chae-won; South Korea
2023	Valérie Maltais; Canada	Nadezhda Morozova; Kazakhstan	Béatrice Lamarche; Canada
2024	Valérie Maltais; Canada	Isabelle Weidemann; Canada	Mia Manganello; United States
2025	Momoka Horikawa; Japan	Isabelle Weidemann; Canada	Ivanie Blondin; Canada

==== Mass start ====
Event	Gold	Silver	Bronze
2020	Mia Kilburg; United States	Kim Bo-reum; South Korea	Park Ji-woo; South Korea
2022	Park Chae-won; South Korea	Jamie Jurak; United States	Dessie Weigel; United States
2023	Valérie Maltais; Canada	Yang Binyu; China	Park Ji-woo; South Korea
2024	Ivanie Blondin; Canada	Giorgia Birkeland; United States	Kyoko Nitta; Japan
2025	Ivanie Blondin; Canada	Mia Manganello; United States	Park Ji-woo; South Korea

==== Team pursuit ====
Event	Gold	Silver	Bronze
2020	United States; Brianna Bocox; Mia Kilburg; Paige Schwartzburg	Canada; Lindsey Kent; Maddison Pearman; Alexa Scott	China; Ahenaer Adake; Chen Xiangyu; Ma Yuhan
2022	United States; Giorgia Birkeland; Jamie Jurak; Dessie Weigel	Canada; Kali Christ; Laura Hall; Lindsey Kent	South Korea; Kim Min-ji; Park Chae-eun; Park Chae-won
2023	Canada; Béatrice Lamarche; Maddison Pearman; Valérie Maltais	China; Chen Xiangyu; Li Leming; Yang Binyu	South Korea; Hwang Hyun-sun; Park Chae-won; Park Ji-woo
2024	Canada; Ivanie Blondin; Valérie Maltais; Isabelle Weidemann	Japan; Momoka Horikawa; Sumire Kikuchi; Yuna Onodera	United States; Giorgia Birkeland; Greta Myers; Anna Quinn
2025	China; Ahenaer Adake; Jin Wenjing; Yang Binyu	Japan; Rin Kosaka; Hana Noake; Yuka Takahashi	South Korea; Kim Yoon-ji; Jeong Yu-na; Park Ji-woo

==== Team sprint ====
Event	Gold	Silver	Bronze
2020	Canada; Noémie Fiset; Maddison Pearman; Brooklyn McDougall	South Korea; Kim Hyun-yung; Kim Min-ji; Kim Min-sun	China; Chen Xiangyu; Lin Xue; Zhang Lina
2022	United States; McKenzie Browne; Chrysta Rands; Sarah Warren	South Korea; Kim Min-ji; Lee Na-hyun; Park Chae-eun	Canada; Kali Christ; Carolina Hiller; Lindsey Kent
2023	China; Zhang Lina; Pei Chong; Yang Binyu	United States; Chrysta Rands-Evans; Anna Quinn; Sarah Warren	Canada; Rose Laliberté-Roy; Alison Desmarais; Abigail McCluskey
2024	Japan; Kurumi Inagawa; Ayano Sato; Miho Takagi	United States; Brittany Bowe; Erin Jackson; Sarah Warren	Canada; Ivanie Blondin; Carolina Hiller; Maddison Pearman
2025	Canada; Ivanie Blondin; Carolina Hiller; Béatrice Lamarche	South Korea; Kim Min-ji; Kim Min-sun; Lee Na-hyun	Kazakhstan; Nadezhda Morozova; Kristina Silaeva; Darja Vazhenina

== Accumulative medal summary ==
As of the 2025 Four Continents Speed Skating Championships

Rank	Nation	Gold	Silver	Bronze	Total
1	Canada (CAN)	21	17	18	56
2	United States (USA)	21	11	11	43
3	South Korea (KOR)	12	12	18	42
4	Kazakhstan (KAZ)	7	11	6	24
5	Japan (JPN)	6	12	10	28
6	China (CHN)	2	6	4	12
7	Chinese Taipei (TPE)	1	1	1	3
8	Argentina (ARG)	0	0	1	1
Totals (8 entries)		70	70	69	209
