= Stanislav Palkin =

Kazakhstani speed skater

Personal information
- Nationality: Kazakhstan
- Born: 4 August 1996 (age 29)

Sport
- Sport: Speed skating
Medal record
Men's speed skating
Representing Kazakhstan
Four Continents Championships
Bronze medal – third place	2020 Milwaukee	Team sprint

Stanislav Palkin (Станислав Александрович Палкин, born 4 August 1996) is a Kazakhstani speed skater who competes internationally.

He participated at the 2018 Winter Olympics.
