= Ahenaer Adake =

Chinese speed skater (born 1999)

Personal information
- Nationality: Chinese
- Born: 1 June 1999 (age 27) Xinjiang, China

Chinese name
- Simplified Chinese: 阿合娜尔·阿达克
- Traditional Chinese: 阿合娜爾·阿達克
Transcriptions
Standard Mandarin
- Hanyu Pinyin: Āhénà'ěr Ādákè

Kazakh name
- Kazakh: Ақнар Адақ اقنار اداق

Sport
- Country: China
- Sport: Speed skating
Medal record
Women's speed skating
Representing China
Four Continents Championships
Gold medal – first place	2025 Hachinohe	Team pursuit
Bronze medal – third place	2020 Milwaukee	Team pursuit
Asian Winter Games
Gold medal – first place	2025 Harbin	Team pursuit

Ahenaer Adake (born 1 June 1999) is a Chinese speed skater of Kazakh ethnicity.

Adake started with short-track speed skating and switched to long-track speed skating in 2018.

At the 2019–2020 ISU Junior World Cup Speed Skating, she took the mass start victory in the U23 category twice. She also holds four track records in team pursuit, on the tracks of Hachinohe (JPN), Hulunbuir (CHN), and Ürümqi (CHN).
