= Park Ji-woo (speed skater) =

South Korean speed skater (born 1998)

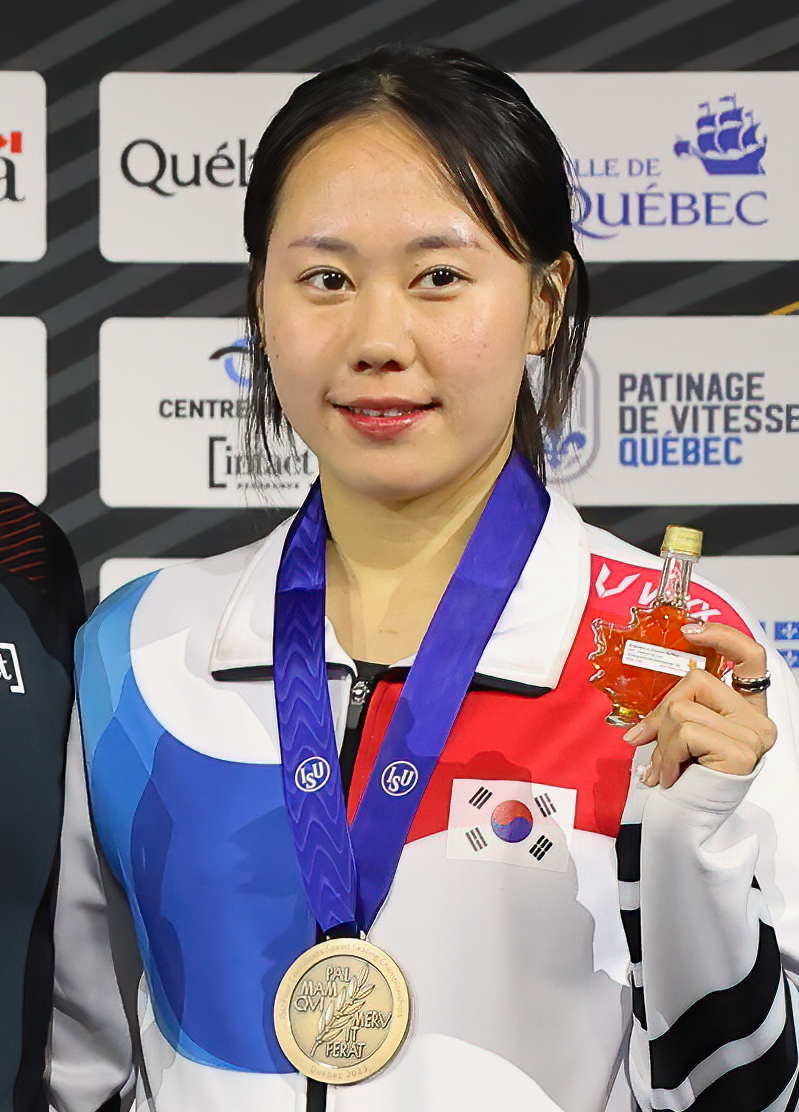
- Park in 2022

Personal information
- Nationality: South Korean
- Born: 27 October 1998 (age 27) Uijeongbu, South Korea
- Height: 1.62 m (5 ft 4 in)

Sport
- Sport: Speed skating
Medal record
Women's speed skating
Representing South Korea
Four Continents Championships
Bronze medal – third place	2020 Milwaukee	1500 m
Bronze medal – third place	2020 Milwaukee	Mass start
Bronze medal – third place	2023 Quebec	Mass start
Bronze medal – third place	2023 Quebec	Team pursuit
Bronze medal – third place	2025 Hachinohe	Mass start
Bronze medal – third place	2025 Hachinohe	Team pursuit
Asian Winter Games
Silver medal – second place	2017 Sapporo	Team pursuit
Bronze medal – third place	2025 Harbin	Team pursuit
World University Games
Gold medal – first place	2023 Lake Placid	1500 m
Silver medal – second place	2023 Lake Placid	3000 m
Silver medal – second place	2023 Lake Placid	Team pursuit

Park Ji-woo (born 27 October 1998) is a South Korean speed skater. She competed in the 2018 Winter Olympics.

Olympic Games
Preceded by Kim A-lang and Kwak Yoon-gy	Flagbearer for South Korea (with Cha Jun-hwan); Milano Cortina 2026	Succeeded by
