= Anders Johnson (speed skater) =

Canadian speed skater (born 1997)

Personal information
- Born: September 24, 1997 (age 28) Fort Frances, Ontario. Canada

Sport
- Country: Canada
- Sport: Speed skating
- Event(s): 500 m, 1000 m
Medal record
Men's speed skating
Representing Canada
World Single Distance Championships
Gold medal – first place	2024 Calgary	Team sprint
Four Continents Championships
Gold medal – first place	2024 Salt Lake City	Team sprint
Bronze medal – third place	2025 Hachinohe	Team sprint

Anders Johnson (born September 24, 1997) is a Canadian speed skater. He competes primarily in the sprint distances of 500 m and 1000 m.

== Career ==
Johnson took up speed skating at the age of 17 in Edmonton, Canada, having previously skated on hockey skates from early childhood and played hockey until Grade 12. At the 2024 World Single Distances Speed Skating Championships in Calgary, Johnson along with Laurent Dubreuil and Antoine Gélinas-Beaulieu, won the gold medal in the team sprint event, breaking the World record in the process. Earlier that season, the team would also win gold at the 2024 Four Continents Speed Skating Championships in Salt Lake City. Anders to make his Olympic debut at the Milano Cortina 2026 Winter Games in the 500m and 1000m distances.

== Personal life ==
Johnson is a Christian. Johnson's grandfather is Danny Johnson, a former hockey player who played in the NHL. Johnson attends Liberty University virtually studying Theology apologetics.
