= Kali Christ =

Canadian speed skater

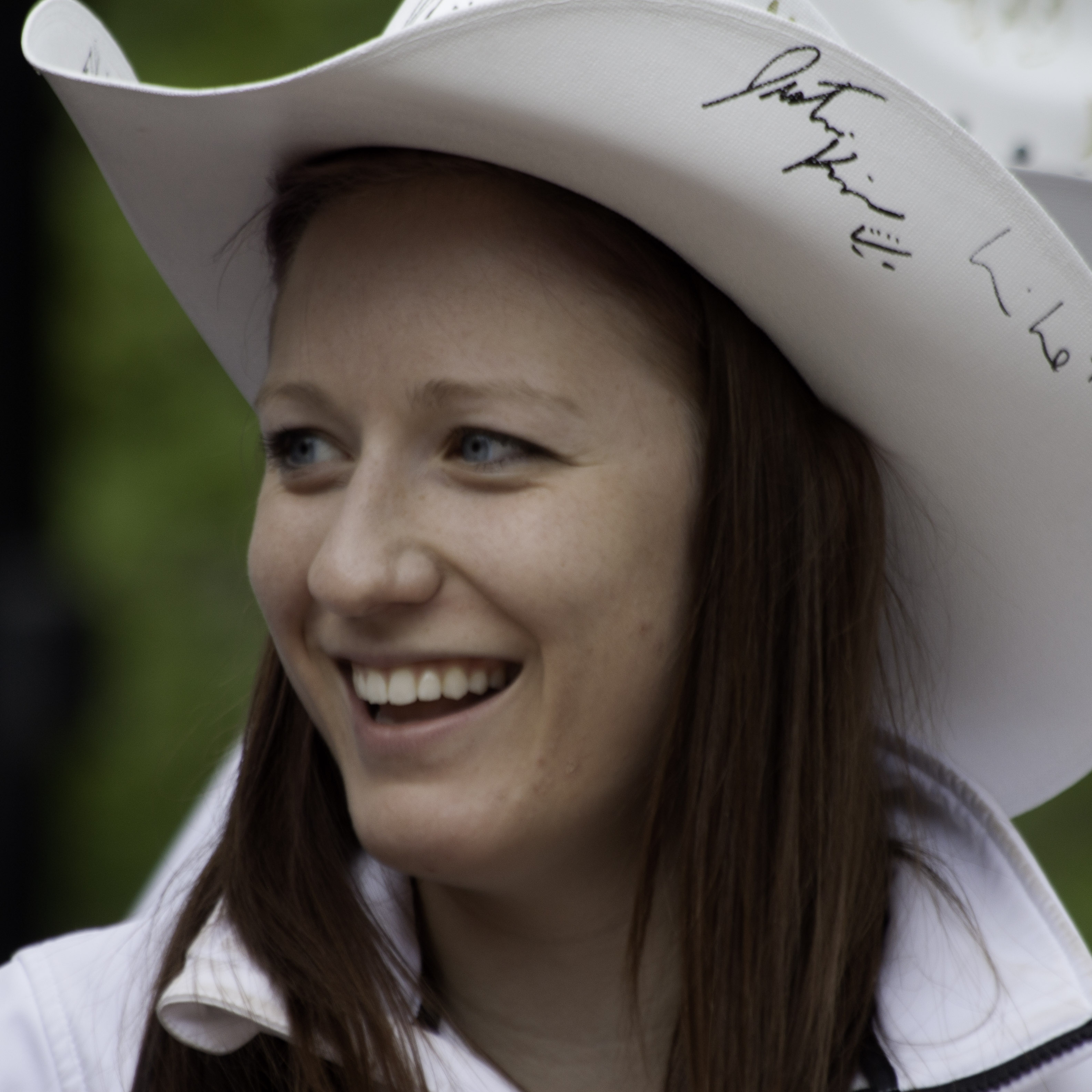

Personal information
- Born: November 9, 1991 (age 34) Regina, Saskatchewan, Canada
- Height: 170 cm (5 ft 7 in)
- Weight: 70 kg (154 lb)

Sport
- Country: Canada
- Sport: Speed skating
- Club: Regina Speed Skating Club
Medal record
World Single Distances Championships
Silver medal – second place	2019 Inzell	Team sprint
Four Continents Championships
Gold medal – first place	2022 Calgary	1500 m
Silver medal – second place	2022 Calgary	Team pursuit
Bronze medal – third place	2022 Calgary	1000 m
Bronze medal – third place	2022 Calgary	Team sprint

Kali Christ (born November 9, 1991) is a Canadian speed skater. She primarily skates in the middle distances of 1000 m, 1500m, as well as the mass start event. Christ represented Canada in both these events at the 2014 Winter Olympics in Sochi as well as the team pursuit event.

== Career ==
=== 2018 Winter Olympics ===
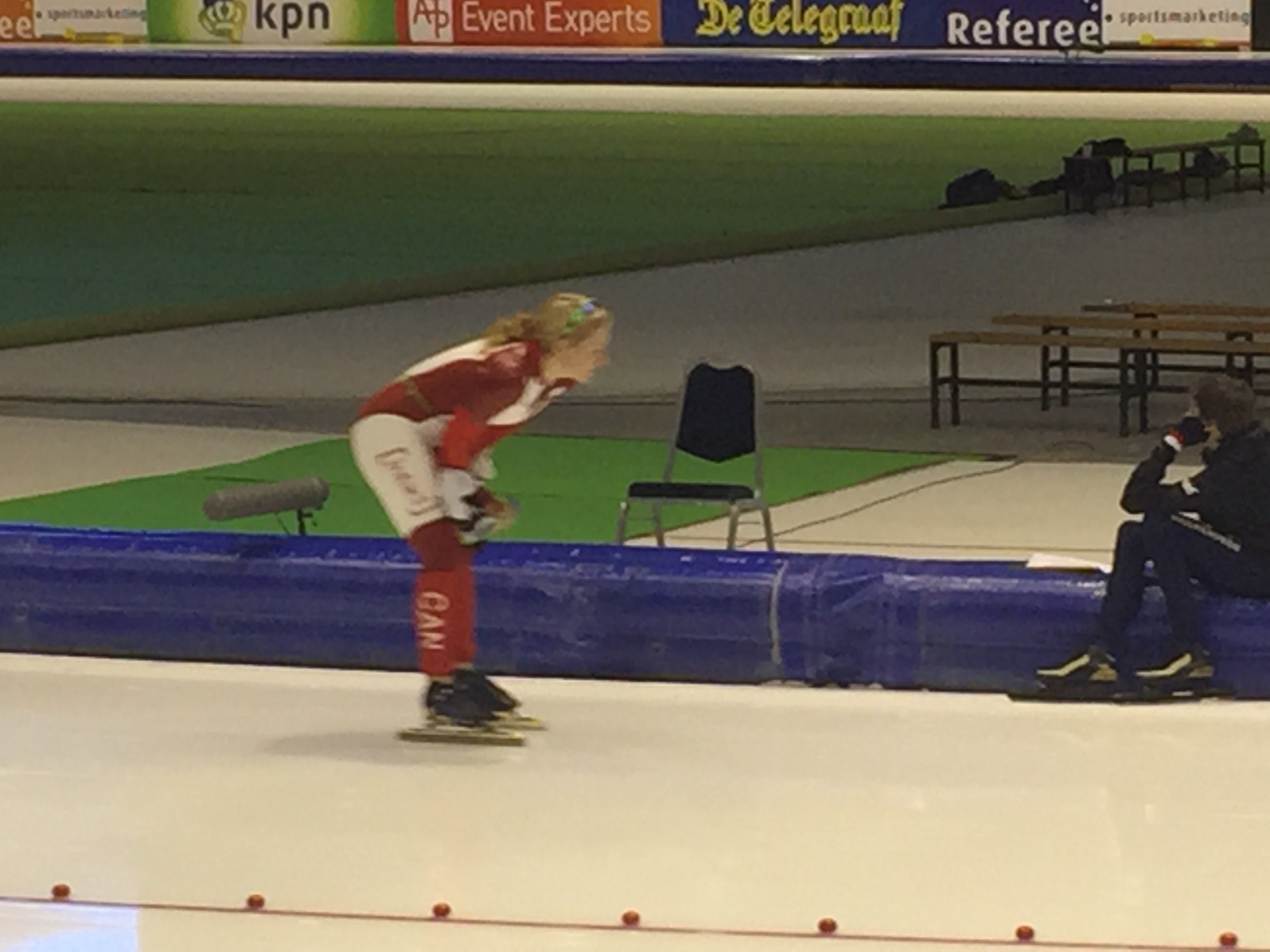

Christ qualified to compete for Canada at the 2018 Winter Olympics.
