= 2024 World Single Distances Speed Skating Championships =

Speed skating event in Calgary

- Venue: Olympic Oval, Calgary, Canada
- Dates: February 15–18

The 2024 World Single Distances Speed Skating Championships were held from February 15 to 18, 2024, at the Olympic Oval in Calgary, Canada.

== Schedule ==
All times are local (UTC−7).

Date	Time	Events
February 15	12:30	3000 m women
February 15	13:41	5000 m men
February 15	15:27	Team sprint women
February 15	15:44	Team sprint men
February 16	12:30	Team pursuit women
February 16	12:55	Team pursuit men
February 16	13:37	500 m men
February 16	14:16	500 m women
February 17	12:30	Mass start semifinals women
February 17	13:18	Mass start semifinals men
February 17	14:03	1000 m women
February 17	14:48	1000 m men
February 17	15:44	Mass start final women
February 17	16:05	Mass start final men
February 18	12:00	5000 m women
February 18	13:07	10,000 m men
February 18	15:08	1500 m women
February 18	16:03	1500 m men

== Medal summary ==
=== Medal table ===
* Host nation (Canada)

Rank	Nation	Gold	Silver	Bronze	Total
1	Netherlands	6	3	4	13
2	United States	3	1	1	5
3	Canada*	2	6	2	10
4	Italy	2	1	0	3
5	Japan	2	0	1	3
6	Belgium	1	0	0	1
7	China	0	3	0	3
8	Norway	0	1	3	4
9	South Korea	0	1	0	1
10	Czech Republic	0	0	2	2
10	Poland	0	0	2	2
12	Switzerland	0	0	1	1
Totals (12 entries)		16	16	16	48

=== Men's events ===
Event	Gold		Silver		Bronze	
500 m	Jordan Stolz; United States	33.69	Laurent Dubreuil; Canada	33.95	Damian Żurek; Poland	34.11
1000 m	Jordan Stolz; United States	1:06.05	Ning Zhongyan; China	1:06.53	Kjeld Nuis; Netherlands	1:06.80
1500 m	Jordan Stolz; United States	1:41.44	Kjeld Nuis; Netherlands	1:42.661	Peder Kongshaug; Norway	1:42.667
5000 m	Patrick Roest; Netherlands	6:07.28	Davide Ghiotto; Italy	6:08.61	Sander Eitrem; Norway	6:09.00
10000 m	Davide Ghiotto; Italy	12:38.82	Ted-Jan Bloemen; Canada	12:47.01	Graeme Fish; Canada	12:48.61
Team sprint	Canada; Anders Johnson; Laurent Dubreuil; Antoine Gélinas-Beaulieu	1:17.173; WR	Netherlands; Janno Botman; Jenning de Boo; Tim Prins	1:17.175	Norway; Henrik Fagerli Rukke; Bjørn Magnussen; Håvard Holmefjord Lorentzen	1:17.31
Team pursuit	Italy; Davide Ghiotto; Andrea Giovannini; Michele Malfatti	3:35.00	Norway; Sander Eitrem; Peder Kongshaug; Sverre Lunde Pedersen	3:36.07	Canada; Antoine Gélinas-Beaulieu; Connor Howe; Hayden Mayeur	3:36.72
Mass start	Bart Swings; Belgium	63 pts	Antoine Gélinas-Beaulieu; Canada	40 pts	Livio Wenger; Switzerland	20 pts

=== Women's events ===
Event	Gold		Silver		Bronze	
500 m	Femke Kok; Netherlands	36.83	Kim Min-sun; South Korea	37.19	Kimi Goetz; United States	37.21
1000 m	Miho Takagi; Japan	1:12.83	Han Mei; China	1:13.27	Jutta Leerdam; Netherlands	1:13.28
1500 m	Miho Takagi; Japan	1:52.29	Han Mei; China	1:52.72	Joy Beune; Netherlands	1:52.91
3000 m	Irene Schouten; Netherlands	3:57.10	Isabelle Weidemann; Canada	3:58.01	Martina Sáblíková; Czech Republic	3:58.33
5000 m	Joy Beune; Netherlands	6:47.72	Irene Schouten; Netherlands	6:48.98	Martina Sáblíková; Czech Republic	6:51.88
Team sprint	Canada; Carolina Hiller; Maddison Pearman; Ivanie Blondin	1:25.14	United States; Sarah Warren; Erin Jackson; Brittany Bowe	1:26.04	Poland; Andżelika Wójcik; Iga Wojtasik; Karolina Bosiek	1:26.63
Team pursuit	Netherlands; Joy Beune; Marijke Groenewoud; Irene Schouten	2:51.20	Canada; Ivanie Blondin; Valérie Maltais; Isabelle Weidemann	2:54.03	Japan; Momoka Horikawa; Ayano Sato; Miho Takagi	2:54.89
Mass start	Irene Schouten; Netherlands	60 pts	Ivanie Blondin; Canada	42 pts	Marijke Groenewoud; Netherlands	21 pts
