= Giorgia Birkeland =

Italian-American speed skater (born 2002)

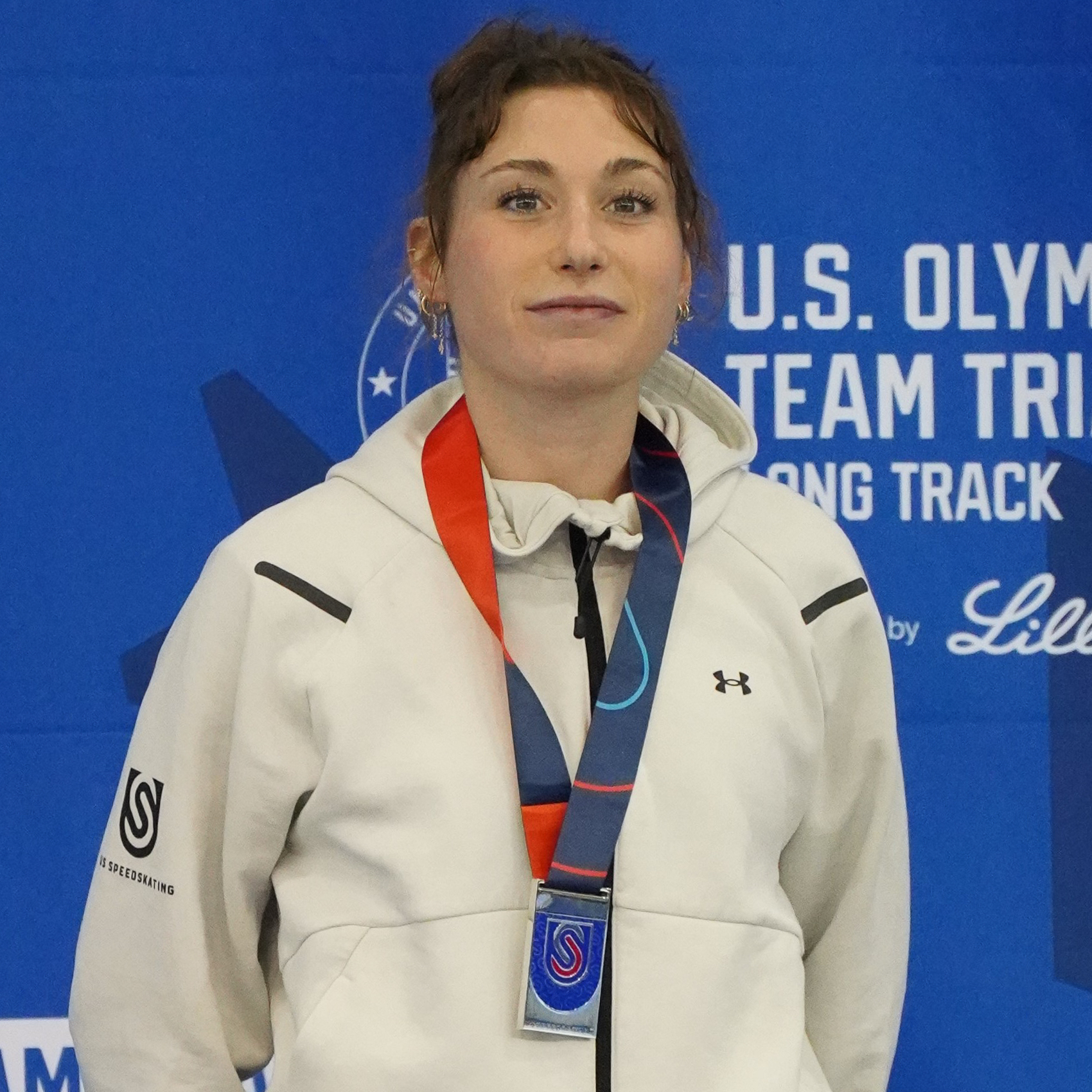
- Birkeland in 2026

Personal information
- Born: June 14, 2002 (age 24) Scandiano, Italy
- Height: 5 ft 6 in (168 cm)

Sport
- Country: United States
- Sport: Speed skating
Medal record
Women's speed skating
Representing the United States
World Single Distances Championships
Bronze medal – third place	2023 Heerenveen	Team pursuit
Four Continents Championships
Gold medal – first place	2022 Calgary	Team pursuit
Silver medal – second place	2024 Salt Lake City	Mass start
Bronze medal – third place	2024 Salt Lake City	Team pursuit

Giorgia Birkeland (born June 14, 2002) is an Italian-born American speed skater. She competed in the women's mass start event at the 2022 Winter Olympics.

== Speed skating career ==
Birkeland started speed skating at the age of eight in her hometown of White Bear Lake, Minnesota. In 2020, she made the national long-distance track team and competed at the World Junior Long Track Championships in Poland, finishing 11th place. Birkeland later participated at the AmCup, placing fourth in the mass start event and fourth in the 3000m event. She made the national team again for the 2021–22 season and placed seventh in the team pursuit event at the World Cup.

At the 2022 US trials, Birkeland won the final qualifying race and was given Team USA's discretionary spot for the Winter Olympics in Beijing. At the women's mass start event, she placed sixth in the second heat and advanced to the finals, where she finished in 12th place. It was her first mass start race at the senior international level.

At the Four Continents Championships in Calgary, Birkeland competed in four events, placing 10th in the 1000m, sixth in the 3000m event, fifth in the 1500m event, and winning the gold medal in the team pursuit event.

== Personal life ==
Birkeland was born on June 14, 2002, in Scandiano, Italy. She grew up in White Bear Lake, Minnesota, and attended Mahtomedi High School. She later moved to Utah to train with the national team, where she attends Salt Lake Community College.
