= 2023 Four Continents Speed Skating Championships =

Speed-skating competition

- Venue: Centre de Glaces, Quebec, Canada
- Dates: 2–4 December 2022
- Competitors: 76 from 7 nations

2023 Four Continents Speed Skating Championships was the third edition of the Four Continents Speed Skating Championships. The event was held in Quebec, Canada.

== Results ==
=== Men's events ===
Event	Gold		Silver		Bronze	
500 m	Laurent Dubreuil; Canada	34.46	Yuma Murakami; Japan	34.88	Kim Jun-ho; South Korea	34.97
1000 m	Laurent Dubreuil; Canada	1:09.27	Park Seong-hyeon; South Korea	1:09.83	Kim Tae-yun; South Korea	1:10.25
1500 m	Antoine Gélinas-Beaulieu; Canada	1:44.66	Dmitry Morozov; Kazakhstan	1:46.30	Jake Weidemann; Canada	1:47.40
5000 m	Vitaliy Chshigolev; Kazakhstan	6:22.81	Lee Seung-hoon; South Korea	6:23.36	Jordan Belchos; Canada	6:24.11
Team sprint	Canada; Christopher Fiola; Laurent Dubreuil; David La Rue	1:20.59	South Korea; Kim Jun-ho; Kim Tae-yun; Park Seong-hyeon	1:21.25	United States; Tanner Worley; Zach Stoppelmoor; Conor McDermott-Mostowy	1:21.28
Team pursuit	South Korea; Chung Jae-won; Um Cheon-ho; Yang Ho-jun	3:47.17	Canada; Jake Weidemann; Antoine Gélinas-Beaulieu; Max Halyk	3:47.51	China; Shen Hanyang; Wang Hongli; Wang Shiwei	3:53.93
Mass start	Chung Jae-won; South Korea	60 pts	Lee Seung-hoon; South Korea	41 pts	Shen Hanyang; China	21 pts

=== Women's events ===
Event	Gold		Silver		Bronze	
500 m	Kim Min-sun; South Korea	38.14	Konami Soga; Japan	38.51	Yukino Yoshida; Japan	38.55
1000 m	Kim Min-sun; South Korea	1:16.06	Yekaterina Aydova; Kazakhstan	1:16.19	Béatrice Lamarche; Canada	1:17.39
1500 m	Nadezhda Morozova; Kazakhstan	1:56.37	Yekaterina Aydova; Kazakhstan	1:57.52	Alison Desmarais; Canada	1:58.26
3000 m	Valérie Maltais; Canada	4:03.15	Nadezhda Morozova; Kazakhstan	4:05.51	Béatrice Lamarche; Canada	4:10.66
Team sprint	China; Zhang Lina; Pei Chong; Yang Binyu	1:30.59	United States; Chrysta Rands-Evans; Anna Quinn; Sarah Warren	1:31.38	Canada; Rose Laliberté-Roy; Alison Desmarais; Abigail McCluskey	1:31.61
Team pursuit	Canada; Béatrice Lamarche; Maddison Pearman; Valérie Maltais	3:06.87	China; Chen Xiangyu; Li Leming; Yang Binyu	3:11.19	South Korea; Hwang Hyun-sun; Park Chae-won; Park Ji-woo	3:11.27
Mass start	Valérie Maltais; Canada	60 pts	Yang Binyu; China	41 pts	Park Ji-woo; South Korea	22 pts

== Medal table ==
* Host nation (Canada)

Rank	Nation	Gold	Silver	Bronze	Total
1	Canada*	7	1	6	14
2	South Korea	4	4	4	12
3	Kazakhstan	2	4	0	6
4	China	1	2	2	5
5	Japan	0	2	1	3
6	United States	0	1	1	2
Totals (6 entries)		14	14	14	42
