= Seitaro Ichinohe =

Japanese speed skater (born 1996)

Personal information
- Nationality: Japanese
- Born: 25 January 1996 (age 30) Bihoro, Hokkaido, Japan
- Height: 1.76 m (5 ft 9 in)
- Weight: 70 kg (154 lb)

Sport
- Country: Japan
- Sport: Speed skating
- Club: Team pursuit
Medal record
World Allround Championships
Bronze medal – third place	2020 Hamar	Allround
World Single Distances Championships
Silver medal – second place	2020 Salt Lake City	Team pursuit
Four Continents Championships
Silver medal – second place	2025 Hachinohe	Team pursuit
Bronze medal – third place	2024 Salt Lake City	Team pursuit
Bronze medal – third place	2025 Hachinohe	5000 m

Seitaro Ichinohe (一戸 誠太郎, Ichinohe Seitarō; born 25 January 1996) is a Japanese speed skater. He competed in the men's 5000 metres at the 2018 Winter Olympics.
