= David La Rue =

Canadian speed skater (born 1998)

Personal information
- Born: August 20, 1998 (age 27) Longueuil, Quebec, Canada

Sport
- Country: Canada
- Sport: Speed skating
- Events: 1000m, 1500 m, mass start
Medal record
Men's speed skating
Representing Canada
Winter World University Games
Gold medal – first place	2023 Lake Placid	Mass start
Bronze medal – third place	2023 Lake Placid	1000 m
Four Continents Championships
Gold medal – first place	2023 Quebec City	Team sprint
Silver medal – second place	2025 Hachinohe	Mass start
World Junior Championships
Gold medal – first place	2018 Salt Lake City	Mass start
Silver medal – second place	2018 Salt Lake City	1500 m
Silver medal – second place	2017 Helsinki	Team sprint

David La Rue (born August 20, 1998) is a Canadian speed skater. He competes primarily in the 1,000, 1,500 metres and mass start.

== Studies ==
La Rue completed his finance degree in 2023, earning a place on the Dean's List, and passed all three levels of the CFA Program.

== Career ==
La Rue formerly competed in short track speed skating, before switching over to long track in 2017.

David La Rue has represented Canada at many international events. La Rue's international successes include winning two medals at the 2023 Winter World University Games in Lake Placid. La Rue won gold in the mass start and bronze in the 1000 metres event. La Rue has won two medals at the Four Continents Speed Skating Championships. In 2023, La Rue won gold as part of the men's team sprint event. Two years later, La Rue would win bronze in the mass start event.
