= Zach Stoppelmoor =

American speed skater (born 1999)

Personal information
- Born: May 11, 1999 (age 27) West Des Moines, Iowa, U.S.
- Height: 5 ft 8 in (173 cm)

Sport
- Country: United States
- Sport: Speed skating
- Events: 500 m, 1000 m
Medal record
Men's Speed skating
Representing the United States
World Single Distances Championships
| Bronze medal – third place | 2025 Hamar | Team sprint |
Four Continents Championships
| Gold medal – first place | 2022 Calgary | Team sprint |
| Gold medal – first place | 2025 Hachinohe | Team sprint |
| Bronze medal – third place | 2023 Quebec | Team sprint |
| Bronze medal – third place | 2022 Calgary | Mass start |

Zach Stoppelmoor (born May 11, 1999) is an American speed skater.

== Career ==
In November 2024, Stoppelmoor competed at the 2025 Four Continents Speed Skating Championships and won gold medal in team sprint, along with Austin Kleba and Cooper McLeod.

During World Cup #3 on January 26, 2025, he set a world record in the team sprint with a time of 1:16.98, becoming the first men's sprint team to break 1:17.

In March 2025, he competed at the 2025 World Single Distances Speed Skating Championships and won a bronze medal in the team sprint.

== World Cup overview ==
| Season | Location | 500 meter | |
|---|---|---|---|
| 2023–2024 | (China) Beijing | 13th | |
| 2024–2025 | (Japan) Nagano | 20th | |
| 2024–2025 | (China) Beijing | 17th | |
| 2024–2025 | (Canada) Calgary | 17th | |
| 2024–2025 | (United States) Milwaukee | 15th | 20th |
| 2024–2025 | (Poland) Tomaszów Mazowiecki | 18th | 20th |
| 2024–2025 | (Netherlands) Heerenveen | 18th | 20th |
| 2025–2026 | (United States) Salt Lake City | 19th | |

| Season | Location | 1000 meter |
|---|---|---|
| 2023–2024 | (China) Beijing | 15th |
| 2023–2024 | (Norway) Stavanger | 20th |
| 2023–2024 | (Poland) Tomaszów Mazowiecki | 18th |
| 2024–2025 | (Japan) Nagano | 14th |
| 2024–2025 | (China) Beijing | 16th |
| 2024–2025 | (Canada) Calgary | 16th |
| 2024–2025 | (United States) Milwaukee | 17th |
| 2024–2025 | (Poland) Tomaszów Mazowiecki | 18th |
| 2024–2025 | (Netherlands) Heerenveen | 19th |
| 2025–2026 | (Norway) Hamar | 9th |
| 2026–2027 | (China) Beijing | 19th |

| Season | Location | Team sprint |
|---|---|---|
| 2023–2024 | (China) Beijing | 1st place, gold medalist(s) |
| 2023–2024 | (Norway) Stavanger | 2nd place, silver medalist(s) |
| 2024–2025 | (China) Beijing | 2nd place, silver medalist(s) |
| 2024–2025 | (Canada) Calgary | 1st place, gold medalist(s) |
| 2024–2025 | (Poland) Tomaszów Mazowiecki | 1st place, gold medalist(s) |
| 2025–2026 | (Netherlands) Heerenveen | 2nd place, silver medalist(s) |
| 2025–2026 | (Germany) Inzell | 1st place, gold medalist(s) |
