= Mia Kilburg =

American speed skater (born 1989)

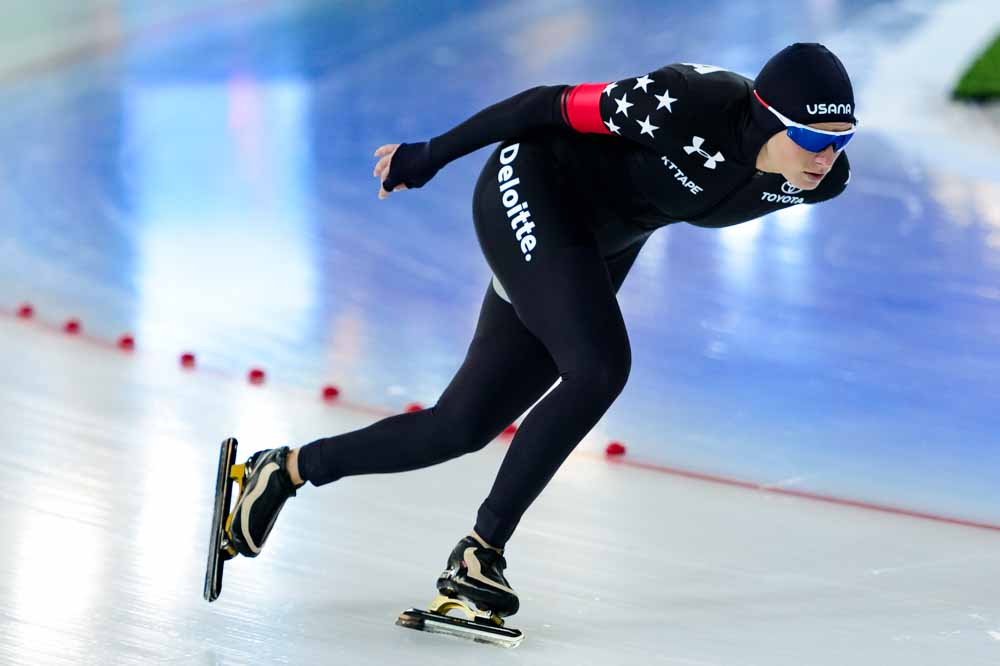
- Kilburg in 2019

Personal information
- Born: Mia Manganello; October 27, 1989 (age 36) Fort Walton Beach, Florida, U.S.
- Height: 5 ft 8 in (173 cm)

Sport
- Country: United States
- Sport: Road bicycle racing; Speed skating
- Cycling career
- Sport: Cycling
- Current team: DNA Pro Cycling
- Discipline: Road
- Role: Rider

Professional teams
- 2016–2017: Visit Dallas DNA Pro Cycling
- 2020–2024: DNA Pro Cycling
Medal record
Women's speed skating
Representing the United States
Olympic Games
Bronze medal – third place	2018 Pyeongchang	Team pursuit
Bronze medal – third place	2026 Milano Cortina	Mass start
World Single Distances Championships
Bronze medal – third place	2023 Heerenveen	Team pursuit
Four Continents Championships
Gold medal – first place	2020 Milwaukee	3000 m
Gold medal – first place	2020 Milwaukee	Mass start
Gold medal – first place	2020 Milwaukee	Team pursuit
Silver medal – second place	2024 Salt Lake City	1500 m
Silver medal – second place	2025 Hachinohe	Mass start
Bronze medal – third place	2020 Milwaukee	1000 m
Bronze medal – third place	2024 Salt Lake City	3000 m

Mia Kilburg (née Manganello; born October 27, 1989) is an American speed skater and former professional racing cyclist. A three-time Olympian, she is a two-time bronze medalist in long track speed skating.

== Speed skating career ==
After nearly qualifying for the 2010 Winter Olympics, Manganello qualified for the 2018 Winter Olympics. Along with teammates Heather Bergsma and Brittany Bowe, she won bronze in the team pursuit at the 2018 Olympics in Pyeongchang. The medal was the first for the U.S. team in speed skating since 2010. In 2022, Manganello again qualified for the Winter Olympics in the mass start event. At her third Olympics in 2026, Manganello won her first individual medal at age 36 in the mass start.

== Cycling career ==
Kilburg is also a professional cyclist, riding for the Visit Dallas DNA Pro Cycling team. She won the points classification at the 2015 Redlands Bicycle Classic.

== World Cup overview ==
Overall trophy

Season	Mass start	Points
2024–2025		247
2025–2026		253

Season	Location	Mass start
2025–2026	(United States) Salt Lake City	1st place, gold medalist(s)
2025–2026	(Canada) Calgary	3rd place, bronze medalist(s)
2025–2026	(Netherlands) Heerenveen	2nd place, silver medalist(s)
2025–2026	(Norway) Hamar	4th
2025–2026	(Germany) Inzell	3rd place, bronze medalist(s)

Season	Location	Team pursuit
2025–2026	(United States) Salt Lake City	3rd place, bronze medalist(s)
2025–2026	(Canada) Calgary	4th
2025–2026	(Norway) Hamar	2nd place, silver medalist(s)
