= Maddison Pearman =

Canadian speed skater (born 1996)

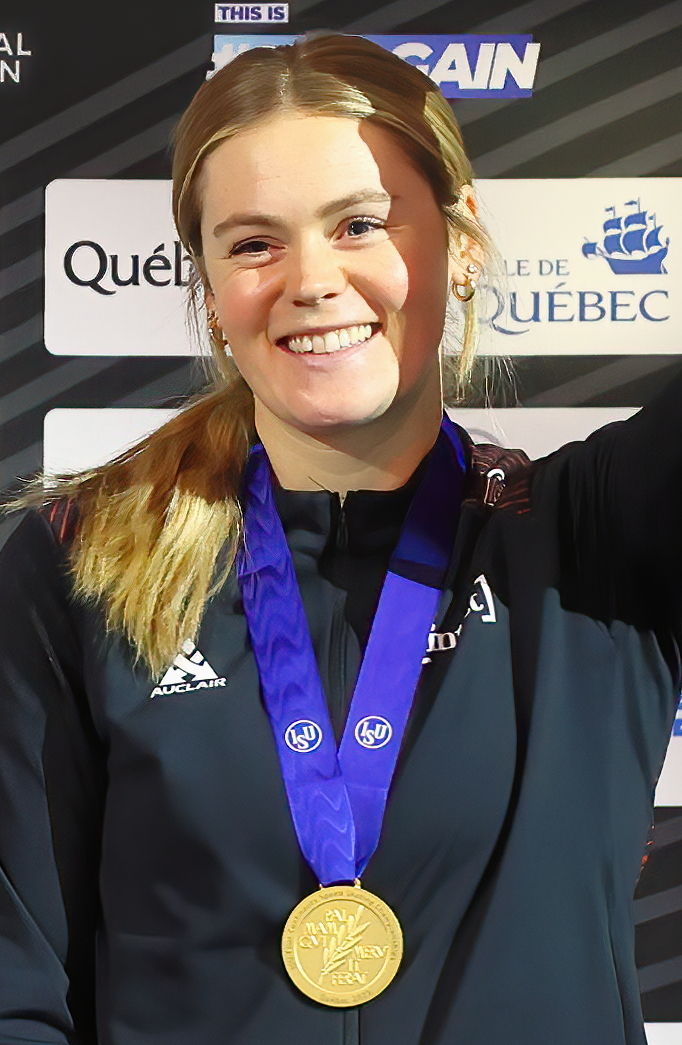
- Pearman in 2022

Personal information
- Born: 23 January 1996 (age 30) Ponoka, Alberta, Canada

Sport
- Country: Canada
- Sport: Speed skating
Medal record
Women's speed skating
Representing Canada
World Single Distances Championships
Gold medal – first place	2024 Calgary	Team sprint
Four Continents Championships
Gold medal – first place	2020 Milwaukee	Team sprint
Gold medal – first place	2023 Quebec	Team pursuit
Silver medal – second place	2020 Milwaukee	Team pursuit
Bronze medal – third place	2024 Salt Lake City	Team sprint

Maddison Pearman (born 23 January 1996) is a Canadian long track speed skater.

== Career ==
Pearman first represented Canada on the international stage in 2013 at the World Junior Championships.

Pearman's first senior competition came in 2020, when she won a silver in the women's team pursuit at the 2020 Four Continents Speed Skating Championships in Milwaukee, Wisconsin. Pearman also won the gold medal in the team sprint event.

Pearman was named to the 2022 Olympic team, where she competed in the 1000 m and 1500 m events.

== Personal records ==
Personal records
Speed skating
Event	Result	Date	Location	Notes
500 m	38.81	13 October 2021	Olympic Oval, Calgary	
1000 m	1:14.67	4 December 2021	Utah Olympic Oval, Salt Lake City	
1500 m	1:54.98	5 December 2021	Utah Olympic Oval, Salt Lake City	
3000 m	4:12.52	8 November 2019	Olympic Oval, Calgary	
5000 m	8:01.62	21 March 2015	Olympic Oval, Calgary	
