= Kim Min-sun (speed skater) =

South Korean speed skater (born 1999)

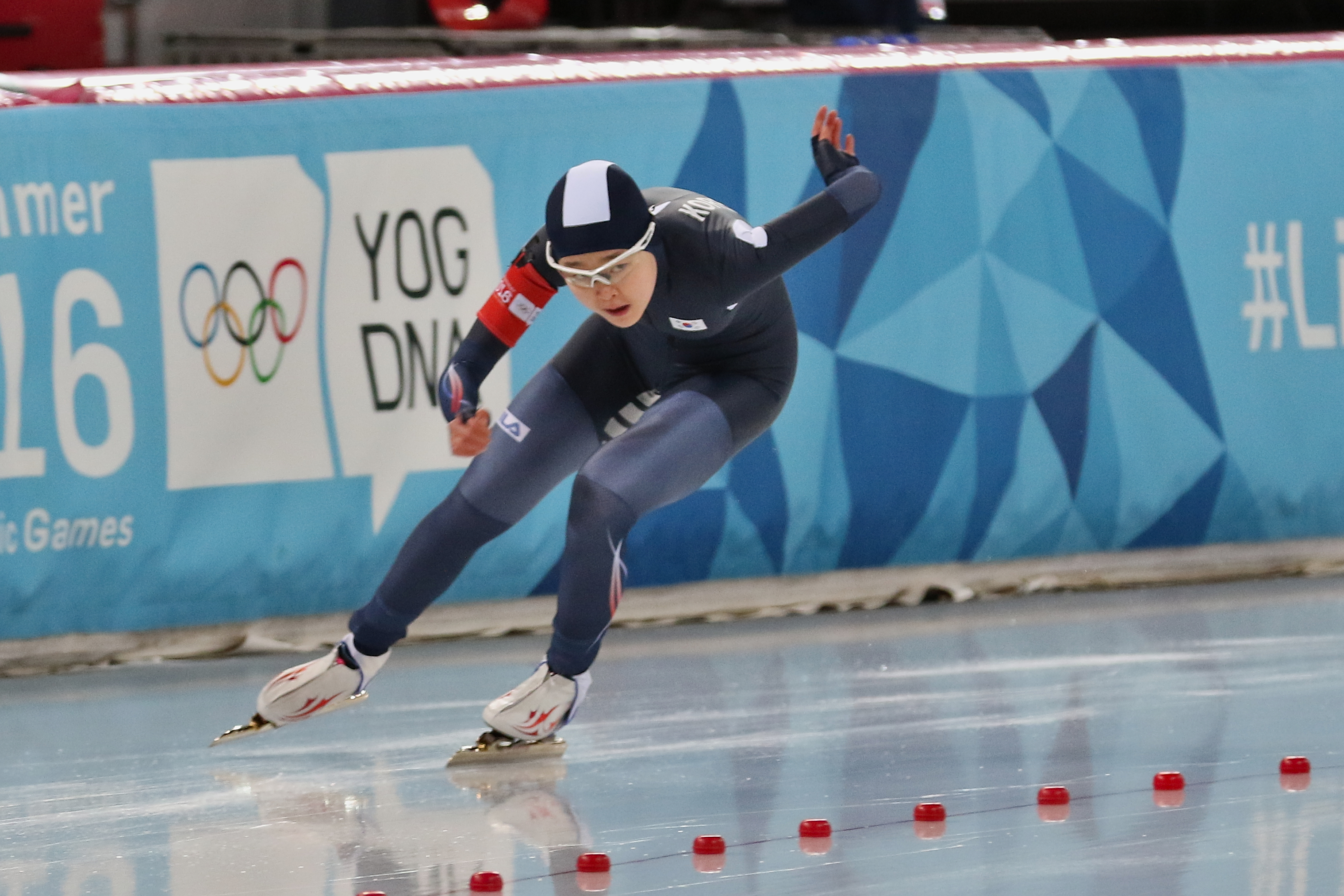
- Kim Min-sun in 2016

Personal information
- Nationality: South Korean
- Born: 16 June 1999 (age 27) Seoul, South Korea
- Height: 1.66 m (5 ft 5 in)
- Weight: 54 kg (119 lb)

Sport
- Sport: Speed skating
Medal record
Women's speed skating
Representing South Korea
World Single Distances Championships
Silver medal – second place	2024 Calgary	500 m
Bronze medal – third place	2025 Hamar	500 m
Four Continents Championships
Gold medal – first place	2020 Milwaukee	500 m
Gold medal – first place	2023 Quebec	500 m
Gold medal – first place	2023 Quebec	1000 m
Silver medal – second place	2020 Milwaukee	Team sprint
Silver medal – second place	2025 Hachinohe	Team sprint
Bronze medal – third place	2024 Salt Lake City	500 m
Bronze medal – third place	2024 Salt Lake City	1000 m
Bronze medal – third place	2025 Hachinohe	500 m
Asian Winter Games
Gold medal – first place	2025 Harbin	500 m
Gold medal – first place	2025 Harbin	Team sprint
Silver medal – second place	2025 Harbin	100 m
Winter Universiade
Gold medal – first place	2023 Lake Placid	500 m
Gold medal – first place	2023 Lake Placid	1000 m
Gold medal – first place	2023 Lake Placid	Mixed relay

Kim Min-sun (born 16 June 1999) is a South Korean speed skater. She won gold in the women's 500 metres event at the 2016 Winter Youth Olympics in Lillehammer and competed in the women's 500 metres at the 2018 Winter Olympics.

== Personal records ==
Personal records
Speed skating
Event	Result	Date	Location	Notes
500 m	36.96	16 December 2022	Olympic Oval, Calgary	
1000 m	1:13.42	28 January 2024	Utah Olympic Oval, Salt Lake City	
1500 m	2:01.93	16 September 2017	Olympic Oval, Calgary	
3000 m	4:36.00	23 January 2013	Seoul	

Records
Preceded by (South Korea) Lee Sang-hwa	Girls' 500 m speed skating world record 22 September 2017 – present	Succeeded by Current holder
