= Kim Jun-ho (speed skater) =

South Korean speed skater (born 1995)

Personal information
- Nationality: South Korean
- Born: 9 October 1995 (age 30) Seoul, South Korea
- Height: 1.79 m (5 ft 10 in)
- Weight: 79 kg (174 lb)

Sport
- Country: South Korea
- Sport: Speed skating
- Club: Gangwon Provincial Office

Achievements and titles
- Highest world ranking: 30 (500 m)
Medal record
Men's speed skating
Representing South Korea
World Single Distances Championships
Silver medal – second place	2019 Inzell	Team sprint
Four Continents Championships
Gold medal – first place	2020 Milwaukee	500 m
Gold medal – first place	2020 Milwaukee	Team sprint
Silver medal – second place	2023 Quebec	Team sprint
Bronze medal – third place	2023 Quebec	500 m
Asian Winter Games
Silver medal – second place	2025 Harbin	Team sprint
Bronze medal – third place	2025 Harbin	100 m
Bronze medal – third place	2025 Harbin	500 m

- Kim Jun-ho
- Hangul: 김준호
- RR: Gim Junho
- MR: Kim Chunho

Kim Jun-ho (Korean: 김준호; born 9 October 1995) is a South Korean speed skater.

Kim competed at the 2014 Winter Olympics for South Korea. In the 500 metres he finished 21st overall.

Kim won a bronze medal at the 500 m event in the 2013 World Junior Championships.

Kim made his World Cup debut in November 2013. As of September 2014, Kim's top World Cup finish is 15th in a 500 m race at Berlin in 2013–14. His best overall finish in the World Cup is 30th, in the 500 metres in 2013–14.

== Education ==
- Korea National Sport University
- Kangwon Physical High School
- Namchuncheon Middle School
- The Attached Elementary School of Chuncheon National University of Education
