= Taiyo Nonomura =

Japanese speed skater (born 2001)

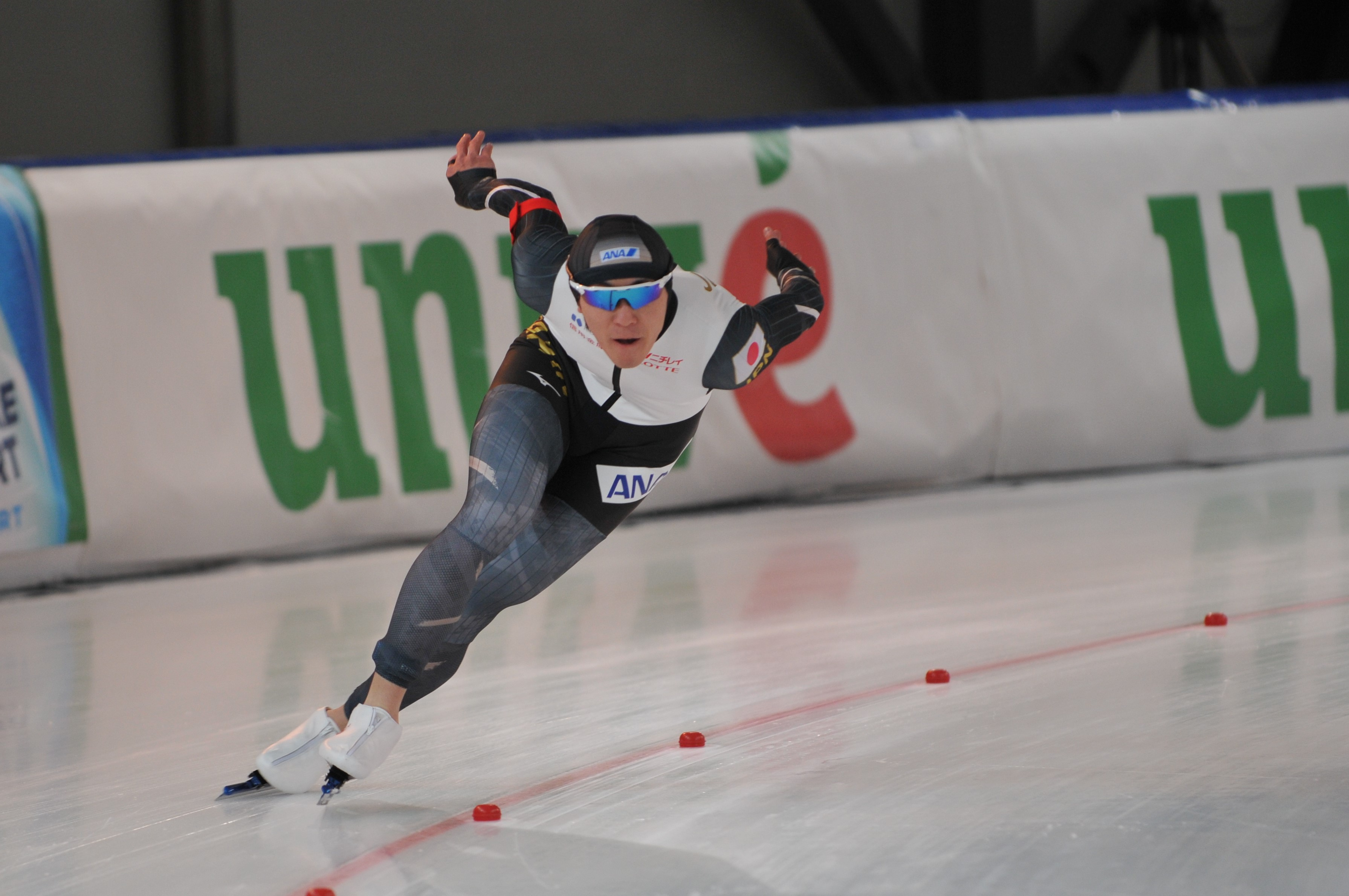
- Nonomura in 2022

Personal information
- Born: 1 July 2001 (age 24) Hokkaido, Japan

Sport
- Country: Japan
- Sport: Speed skating
- Event(s): 1000 m, 1500 m
Medal record
Men's speed skating
Representing Japan
World University Games
Gold medal – first place	2023 Lake Placid	1500 m
Silver medal – second place	2023 Lake Placid	1000 m
Four Continents Championships
Silver medal – second place	2024 Salt Lake City	1000 m
Bronze medal – third place	2025 Hachinohe	1500 m

Taiyo Nonomura (野々村太陽, Nonomura Taiyo; born 1 July 2001) is a Japanese speed skater. He represented Japan at the 2026 Winter Olympics.

== Career ==
Nonomura competed at the 2023 Winter World University Games and won a gold medal in the 1500 metres, with a time of 1:49.93. He also won a silver medal in the 1000 metres with a time of 1:12.50.

In January 2024, he competed at the 2024 Four Continents Speed Skating Championships and won a silver medal in the 1000 metres with a Japanese record time of 1:06.68.

In December 2025, during the final qualifying round for the 2026 Winter Olympics at the All Japan Championships, Nonomura won the 1500 metres with a time of 1:45.26, and qualified to represent Japan at the Olympics. On 11 February 2026, he competed in the 1000 metres and finished in 13th place with a time of 1:08.87.
