= Sarah Warren =

American speed skater (born 1996)

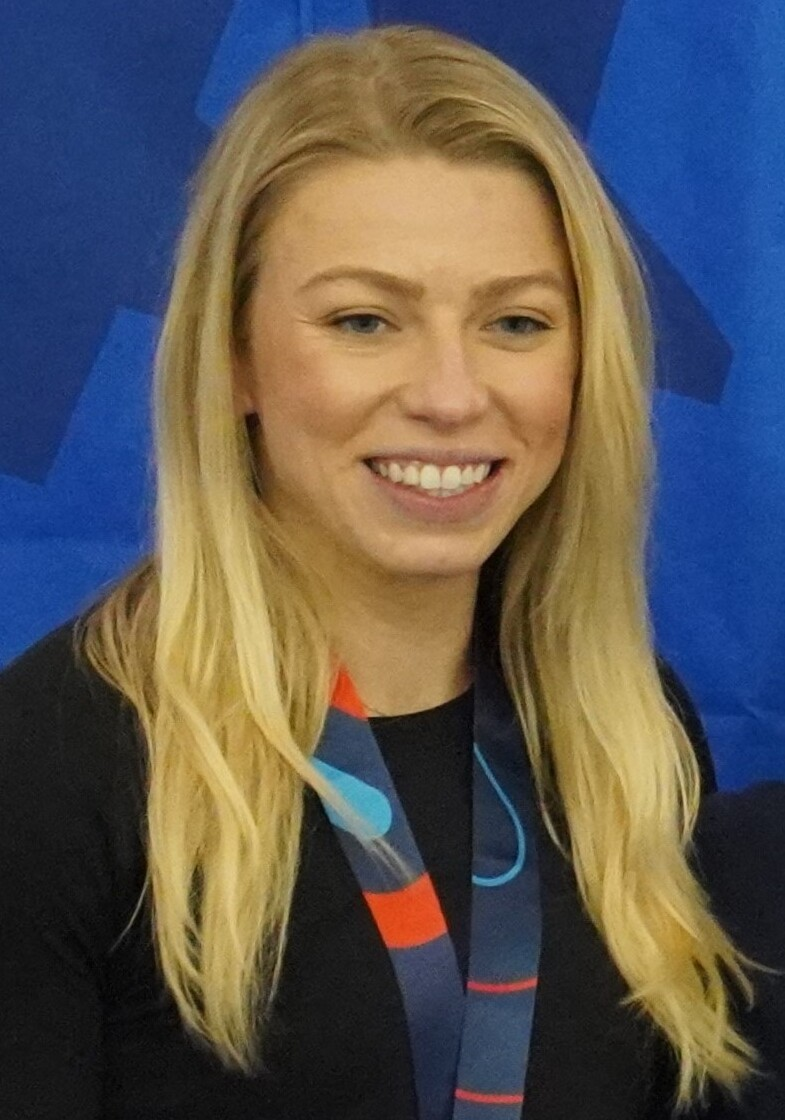
- Warren in 2026

Personal information
- Nationality: United States
- Born: June 20, 1996 (age 30) Willow Brook Estates, Illinois, U.S.

Sport
- Country: United States
- Sport: Speed skating
- Events: 500 m, 1000 m, 1500 m, 3000 m
Medal record
Representing the United States
Women's speed skating
World Single Distances Championships
| Silver medal – second place | 2024 Calgary | Team sprint |
Four Continents Championships
| Gold medal – first place | 2022 Calgary | Team sprint |
| Silver medal – second place | 2023 Quebec | Team sprint |
| Silver medal – second place | 2024 Salt Lake City | Team sprint |

Sarah Warren (born June 20, 1996) is an American speed skater. She is a silver medalist at the World Single Distances Championships and a three-time US individual distance medalist.

== Career ==
Warren first started skating at the age of 7 and took to the ice as a hockey player. She was one of the few girls to play defense for the Chicago Blues travel team. She also competed in track and field in high school, setting school records in the 400m and 4x400m relay. At age 10, Sarah took up short track speed skating for Glen Ellyn and trained at the Pettit Center in Milwaukee for long track. In 2009, she missed six months after knee surgery.

In 2012, Warren competed in short track speed skating at the Winter Youth Olympics in Innsbruck, where she placed 11th in the 1000m and fourth in the 500m. That same year, she won the U.S. Junior Speed Skating Championships all-around title. A year later, she made her debut at the World Junior Championships, finishing seventh in the 500m. In 2014, she became the U.S. Junior Champion in the 500m. In 2016, she took a break from skating to attend university.

In the 2019/20 season, Warren returned to competition and in 2021, she placed third at the U.S. Championships in the sprint all-around. She made her World Cup debut, and in December 2021, at the Four Continents Championships in Calgary, she placed second in the 1500 m and won gold in the team sprint. The following year, Sarah and her partners won silver in the team sprint in Quebec City. She then won two bronze medals at the U.S. Championships.

In the 2023/24 season, Warren won the gold medal in the team sprint at the World Cup stage in Stavanger. She then won the silver medal in the team sprint at the Four Continents Championships in Salt Lake City. In March 2024, at the World Single Distance Championships in Calgary, she won the silver medal in the team sprint, with a time of 1:26.04.

== Personal life ==
Warren attended Hinsdale South High School. She also played soccer during her senior year of high school and at Varsity, where she was captain of the Academy United SC team. Her father, Morrison, also played soccer in college. He and her mother, Katherine Warren, who enjoyed many sports, were the biggest influences on her athletic career. She also has an older brother, John, who plays soccer and rugby at the University of Chicago. She enjoys cooking, spending time with her dog, and enjoys paddleboarding and bodyboarding. In 2014, she enrolled at the University of Illinois and graduated with a bachelor's degree in bioengineering in 2019. In 2022, she received a master's degree in bioengineering from Johns Hopkins University in Baltimore, Maryland. She also works part-time as a teaching assistant at the university since March 2021.

Warren is also the great-niece of Kevin Warren.
