= Antoine Gélinas-Beaulieu =

Canadian speed skater

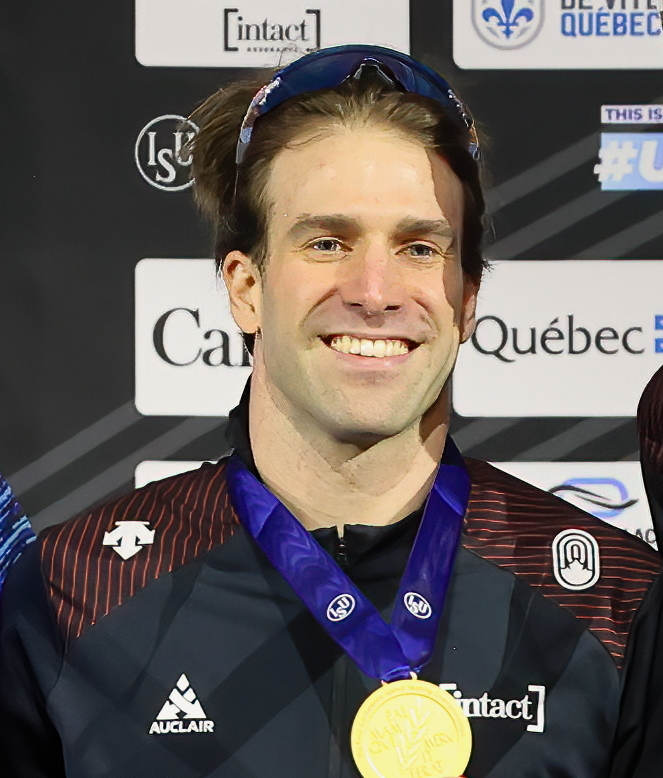
- Gélinas-Beaulieu in 2022

Personal information
- Born: May 5, 1992 (age 34) Sherbrooke, Quebec, Canada
- Height: 1.70 m (5 ft 7 in)
- Weight: 72 kg (159 lb)

Sport
- Country: Canada
- Sport: Speed skating
- Event: Mass start
Medal record
Representing Canada
Men's speed skating
World Single Distances Championships
Gold medal – first place	2023 Heerenveen	Team sprint
Gold medal – first place	2024 Calgary	Team sprint
Silver medal – second place	2023 Heerenveen	Team pursuit
Silver medal – second place	2024 Calgary	Mass start
Bronze medal – third place	2020 Salt Lake City	Mass start
Bronze medal – third place	2024 Calgary	Team pursuit
Four Continents Championships
Gold medal – first place	2023 Quebec	1500 m
Gold medal – first place	2024 Salt Lake City	Team sprint
Silver medal – second place	2023 Quebec	Team pursuit
Silver medal – second place	2024 Salt Lake City	Team pursuit
Bronze medal – third place	2024 Salt Lake City	Mass start
Men's short-track speed skating
World Junior Championships
Silver medal – second place	2009 Sherbrooke	1000m
Silver medal – second place	2010 Taipei	Overall
Silver medal – second place	2010 Taipei	1500m super final
Silver medal – second place	2010 Taipei	1000m
Silver medal – second place	2010 Taipei	500m
Silver medal – second place	2010 Taipei	3000m relay
Bronze medal – third place	2009 Sherbrooke	1500m
Canada Games
Gold medal – first place	2011 Halifax	1500m
Gold medal – first place	2011 Halifax	3000m
Gold medal – first place	2011 Halifax	5000m super
Gold medal – first place	2011 Halifax	Team pursuit
Silver medal – second place	2011 Halifax	500m

Antoine Gélinas-Beaulieu (born May 5, 1992) is a Canadian long track speed skater and short track speed skater. Born in Sherbrooke, Quebec, Gélinas-Beaulieu currently resides in Quebec City. He is currently a member of the national long track team for Canada.

== Career ==
The 2009 World Junior Short Track Championships were held in his hometown of Sherbrooke. Antoine won a silver medal in the 1000 m and a bronze in the 1500 m race; this aided his 4th-place finish overall as a 16-year-old. Gélinas-Beaulieu was named Quebec's male national athlete of the year at the 37th annual Sports Québec Gala on December 23, 2009. At the following junior short track championships in 2010 in Taipei he won five silver medals in the 500m, 1000m, 1500m super final, 3000m relay, and the overall silver medal.

Gélinas-Beaulieu also received two bronze medals at the 2010 World Junior Speed Skating Championships in long track. He received the bronze medals in the 1500 m and the 5000 m. He also finished third overall in the competition.

Next he attended the 2011 Canada Winter Games in Halifax, Nova Scotia. There Gélinas-Beaulieu won three gold medals in long track speed skating for Quebec in the 1,500 m, 3,000 m, 5,000 m. His victories came as part of a comeback, as much of the previous season had been lost to him due to being ill from mononucleosis.
