= Rio Yamada =

Japanese speed skater (born 1997)

Personal information
- Born: 10 July 1997 (age 29) Suwa, Japan

Sport
- Country: Japanese
- Sport: Speed skating
- Events: 500m, 1000m
Medal record
Women's speed skating
Representing Japan
Four Continents Championships
| Silver medal – second place | 2020 Milwaukee | 1000 m |

Rio Yamada (山田 梨央, Yamada Riō; born 10 July 1997) is a Japanese long track speed skater specialized in the sprint distances. She represented Japan at the 2026 Winter Olympics.

At the end of 2018, Yamada held the 1000 metres track record at the Wind Park Skating Rink Karuizawa.
