= Laurent Dubreuil =

Canadian speed skater (born 1992)

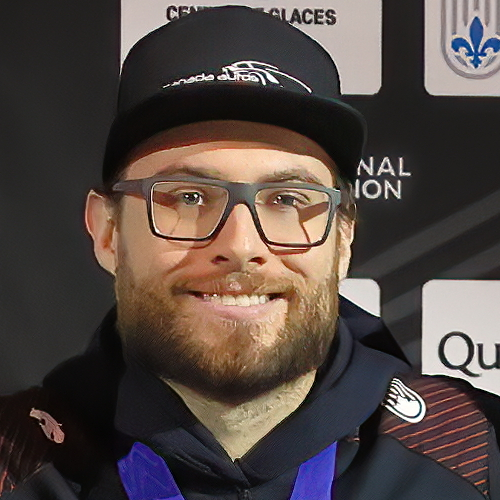
- Dubreuil in 2022

Personal information
- Born: July 25, 1992 (age 33) Quebec City, Quebec, Canada
- Height: 1.82 m (6 ft 0 in)
- Weight: 80 kg (176 lb)

Sport
- Country: Canada
- Sport: Speed skating
- Events: 500 m, 1000 m
- Club: Club Patinage de Vitesse de Levis
Medal record
Men's speed skating
Representing Canada
Olympic Games
Silver medal – second place	2022 Beijing	1000 m
Bronze medal – third place	2026 Milano Cortina	500 m
World Single Distance Championships
Gold medal – first place	2021 Heerenveen	500 m
Gold medal – first place	2023 Heerenveen	Team sprint
Gold medal – first place	2024 Calgary	Team sprint
Silver medal – second place	2023 Heerenveen	500 m
Silver medal – second place	2024 Calgary	500 m
Bronze medal – third place	2015 Heerenveen	500 m
Bronze medal – third place	2020 Salt Lake City	1000 m
Bronze medal – third place	2021 Heerenveen	1000 m
World Sprint Championships
Silver medal – second place	2020 Hamar	Sprint
Bronze medal – third place	2024 Inzell	Sprint
Four Continents Championships
Gold medal – first place	2023 Quebec	500 m
Gold medal – first place	2023 Quebec	1000 m
Gold medal – first place	2023 Quebec	Team sprint
Gold medal – first place	2024 Salt Lake City	Team sprint
Gold medal – first place	2024 Salt Lake City	500 m
Silver medal – second place	2020 Milwaukee	1000 m
Silver medal – second place	2025 Hachinohe	500 m
Bronze medal – third place	2025 Hachinohe	1000 m
Bronze medal – third place	2025 Hachinohe	Team sprint

Laurent Dubreuil (born July 25, 1992) is a Canadian speed skater. He competes primarily in the short distances of 500 m and 1000 m. Dubreuil won his first World Cup medal during the 2014–15 season when he placed third in the World Cup stop in Seoul. He won a bronze medal at the 2015 World Single Distance Championships and a silver medal in the 1000m at the 2022 Beijing Winter Olympics.

== Career ==
=== World Cup Career ===
During the 2021–22 ISU Speed Skating World Cup stop in Calgary, Dubreuil broke the Canadian record in the 500 metres event by racing to a time of 33.778. Dubreuil won a medal in the first eight World Cup races.

=== Winter Olympics ===
==== 2018 ====
Dubreuil qualified to compete for Canada at the 2018 Winter Olympics.

==== 2022 ====
Dubreuil qualified to compete for Canada at the 2022 Winter Olympics.

He competed in the 500m event and finished up fourth. During his race, he was charged with a false start. This was questioned by Bart Veldkamp, who called it "very suspicious". However Dubreuil said the false start was not an excuse for him not winning a race, and saying "it's something that's totally possible to overcome. It's just a minor inconvenience. That was not the difference."

In the 1000m race, he finished second, earning the silver medal, his first Olympic podium finish.

==== 2026 ====
Dubreuil qualified to compete for Canada at the 2026 Winter Olympics.

In the 500m race, he finished third, earning the bronze medal. He briefly set the Olympic record before being beaten by the eventual gold and silver medallists.
