= Béatrice Lamarche =

Canadian speed skater (born 1998)

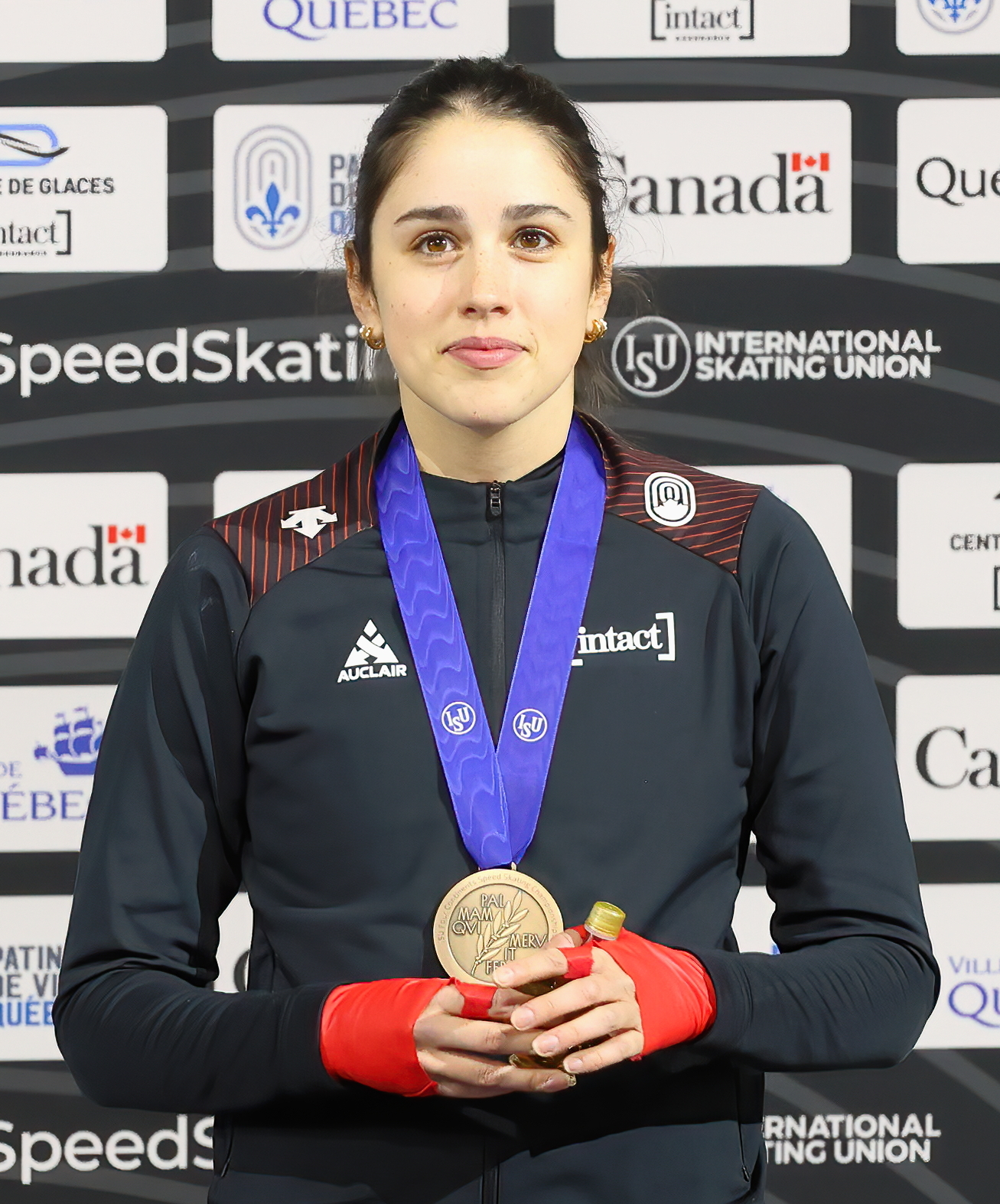
- Lamarche in 2022

Personal information
- Born: 1 October 1998 (age 27) Quebec City, Quebec, Canada

Sport
- Country: Canada
- Sport: Speed skating
Medal record
Women's speed skating
Representing Canada
World Single Distances Championships
| Silver medal – second place | 2025 Hamar | Team sprint |
Four Continents Championships
| Gold medal – first place | 2023 Quebec | Team pursuit |
| Gold medal – first place | 2025 Hachinohe | Team sprint |
| Bronze medal – third place | 2023 Quebec | 1000 m |
| Bronze medal – third place | 2023 Quebec | 3000 m |

Béatrice Lamarche (French pronunciation: [beatʁis lamaʁʃ]; born 1 October 1998) is a Canadian long track speed skater, who has been active since 2010. Lamarche is a sprinter.

As a junior, Lamarche became national champion five times and participated at the 2016, 2017 and 2018 World Junior Speed Skating Championships and ISU Junior World Cup Speed Skating events. At the elite level she made her ISU Speed Skating World Cup debut during the 2016-17 speed skating season. She won at the 2019 Canadian Single Distance Championships the bronze medal in the 1000 metres event. Due to that result, she represented her nation at the 2020 World Single Distance Speed Skating Championships in the 1000 metres event, finishing 21st.

She is the daughter of former olympian speed skater Ben Lamarche and a niece of former olympian speed skater Marie-Pierre Lamarche.

== Records ==
=== Personal records ===
Personal records
Women's speed skating
| Event | Result | Date | Location | Notes |
| 500 m | 37.30 | 15.11.2025 | Utah Olympic Oval, Salt Lake City | |
| 1000 m | 1:14.73 | 09.02.2026 | Milano Speed Skating Stadium, Milan | |
| 1500 m | 1:54.55 | 15.11.2025 | Utah Olympic Oval, Salt Lake City | |
| 3000 m | 4:11.06 | 15.03.2019 | Olympic Oval, Calgary | |
| 5000 m | 7:30.91 | 18.03.2017 | Olympic Oval, Calgary | |
