= KNSB Dutch Allround Championships =

Speed skating competition

The Dutch Allround Championships of speed skating, organised by the Royal Dutch Speed Skating Association (KNSB), is the official Dutch championship to determine the Dutch Allround champion, in contrast to the KNSB Dutch Single Distance Championships, which determines a Dutch champion for each distance. The Allround distance championships date back to 1901 for men and 1955 for women.

== Men's Allround ==
Men's Medalist
Year	Venue	Gold	Silver	Bronze
1901	Leeuwarden	Eeko Banning	Sytze Bouma	G. Koops
1902	Not held			
1903	Paterswolde	Coen de Koning	Jan Greve	Bernard Bezemer
1904	Not held			
1905	Deventer	Coen de Koning	Jan Greve	Bernard Bezemer
1906	Not held			
1907	Not held			
1908	Not held			
1909	Not held			
1910	Not held			
1911	Not held			
1912	Leeuwarden	Coen de Koning	Tamme Geertsema	Sjaak de Koning
1913	Not held			
1914	Zwolle	Sjaak de Koning	Jan Bakker	Marinus Zwart
1915	Not held			
1916	Not held			
1917	Veendam	Jan Bakker	Anton Wilkens	Sjaak de Koning
1918	Not held			
1919	Zwolle	Max Tetzner	Sjaak de Koning	Albert Wajer
1920	Not held			
1921	Not held			
1922	Groningen	Max Tetzner	Jan Bakker	Harry Krul
1923	Not held			
1924	Not held			
1925	Not held			
1926	Not held			
1927	Not held			
1928	Not held			
1929	Groningen	Dolph van der Scheer	Siem Heiden	Teun Hooftman
1930	Not held			
1931	Not held			
1932	Not held			
1933	Heerenveen	Dolf van der Scheer	Lou Dijkstra	Jan Langedijk
1934	Not held			
1935	Not held			
1936	Not held			
1937	Not held			
1938	Not held			
1939	Not held			
1940	Groningen	Jan Langedijk	Roelof Koops	Jan Roos
1941	Bergen	Herman Buyen	Jan Langedijk	Roelof Koops
1942	Zutphen	Herman Buyen	Jaap Havekotte	Piet Keijzer
1943	Not held			
1944	Not held			
1945	Not held			
1946	Heerenveen	Piet Keijzer	Herman Buyen	Siem van Hoorn
1947	Kralingen	Jan Langedijk	Frans Verbiezen	Jaap Havekotte
1948	Not held			
1949	Not held			
1950	Not held			
1951	Zutphen	Kees Broekman	Gerard Maarse	Jan Charisius
1952	Not held			
1953	Not held			
1954	Zwolle	Egbert van 't Oever	Cock van der Elst	Jan Wervers
1955	Heerenveen	Gerard Maarse	Egbert van 't Oever	Wim de Graaff
1956	Kralingen	Wim de Graaff	Jeen van den Berg	Gerard Maarse
1957	Not held			
1958	Not held			
1959	Not held			
1960	Not held			
1961	Not held			
1962	Amsterdam	Henk van der Grift	Chris Meeuwisse	Arnold Vroege
1963	Groningen	Rudie Liebrechts	Arie Zee	Chris Meeuwisse
1964	Deventer	Rudie Liebrechts	Ard Schenk	Piet Meyer
1965	Amsterdam	Ard Schenk	Rudie Liebrechts	Kees Verkerk
1966	Deventer	Kees Verkerk	Ard Schenk	Rudie Liebrechts
1967	Amsterdam	Kees Verkerk	Ard Schenk	Peter Nottet
1968	Amsterdam	Ard Schenk	Peter Nottet	Jan Bols
1969	Heerenveen	Kees Verkerk	Jan Bols	Ard Schenk
1970	Deventer	Ard Schenk	Jan Bols	Jappie van Dijk
1971	Amsterdam	Jan Bols	Ard Schenk	Eddy Verheijen
1972	Deventer	Kees Verkerk	Jan Bols	Eddy Verheijen
1973	Heerenveen	Jappie van Dijk	Piet Kleine	Hans van Helden
1974	Assen	Harm Kuipers	Piet Kleine	Jan Derksen
1975	Assen	Harm Kuipers	Piet Kleine	Jan Derksen
1976	Groningen	Hans van Helden	Piet Kleine	Joop Pasman
1977	Assen	Hans van Helden	Piet Kleine	Klaas Vriend
1978	Eindhoven	Piet Kleine	Hilbert van der Duim	Joop Pasman
1979	Heerenveen	Hilbert van der Duim	Yep Kramer	Klaas Vriend
1980	Den Haag	Hilbert van der Duim	Yep Kramer	Piet Kleine
1981	Assen	Hilbert van der Duim	Piet Kleine	Frits Schalij
1982	Heerenveen	Hilbert van der Duim	Frits Schalij	Rolf Sibrandy
1983	Deventer	Hilbert van der Duim	Robert Vunderink	Frits Schalij
1984	Groningen	Hilbert van der Duim	Frits Schalij	Yep Kramer
1985	Alkmaar	Hilbert van der Duim	Hein Vergeer	Frits Schalij
1986	Assen	Hein Vergeer	Gerard Kemkers	Frits Schalij
1987	Deventer	Hein Vergeer	Gerard Kemkers	Leo Visser
1988	Alkmaar	Leo Visser	Gerard Kemkers	Anne Jan Portijk
1989	Den Haag	Leo Visser	Gerard Kemkers	Bart Veldkamp
1990	Assen	Ben van der Burg	Gerard Kemkers	Thomas Bos
1991	Alkmaar	Leo Visser	Bart Veldkamp	Ben van der Burg
1992	Alkmaar	Falko Zandstra	Bart Veldkamp	Rintje Ritsma
1993	Assen	Falko Zandstra	Bart Veldkamp	Rintje Ritsma
1994	Den Haag	Ids Postma	Rintje Ritsma	Bart Veldkamp
1995	Assen	Falko Zandstra	Rintje Ritsma	Bart Veldkamp
1996	Den Haag	Rintje Ritsma	Ids Postma	Martin Hersman
1997	Assen	Rintje Ritsma	Falko Zandstra	Gianni Romme
1998	Deventer	Jelmer Beulenkamp	Carl Verheijen	Jochem Uytdehaage
1999	Den Haag	Ids Postma	Jochem Uytdehaage	Bob de Jong
2000	Den Haag	Gianni Romme	Rintje Ritsma	Ids Postma
2001	Heerenveen	Jochem Uytdehaage	Ids Postma	Mark Tuitert
2002	Alkmaar	Gianni Romme	Ids Postma	Jarno Meijer
2003	Assen	Gianni Romme	Mark Tuitert	Rintje Ritsma
2004	Eindhoven	Jochem Uytdehaage	Carl Verheijen	Mark Tuitert
2005	Heerenveen	Sven Kramer	Carl Verheijen	Mark Tuitert
2006	Utrecht	Mark Tuitert	Rintje Ritsma	Bob de Jong
2007	Heerenveen	Sven Kramer	Carl Verheijen	Erben Wennemars
2008	Groningen	Sven Kramer	Wouter olde Heuvel	Ben Jongejan
2009	Heerenveen	Sven Kramer	Wouter olde Heuvel	Carl Verheijen
2010	Heerenveen	Wouter olde Heuvel	Ted-Jan Bloemen	Koen Verweij
2011	Heerenveen	Wouter olde Heuvel	Koen Verweij	Jan Blokhuijsen
2012	Heerenveen	Ted-Jan Bloemen	Koen Verweij	Ben Jongejan
2013	Heerenveen	Sven Kramer	Jan Blokhuijsen	Renz Rotteveel
2014	Amsterdam	Koen Verweij	Renz Rotteveel	Wouter olde Heuvel
2015	Heerenveen	Sven Kramer	Wouter olde Heuvel	Koen Verweij
2016	Heerenveen	Jan Blokhuijsen	Douwe de Vries	Patrick Roest
2017	Heerenveen	Jan Blokhuijsen	Patrick Roest	Marcel Bosker
2018	Heerenveen	Marcel Bosker	Lex Dijkstra	Thomas Geerdinck
2019	Heerenveen	Douwe de Vries	Marcel Bosker	Chris Huizinga
2020	Heerenveen	Jan Blokhuijsen	Marcel Bosker	Douwe de Vries
2021	Heerenveen	Patrick Roest	Marcel Bosker	Marwin Talsma
2022	Heerenveen	Marcel Bosker	Beau Snellink	Marwin Talsma
2023	Heerenveen	Patrick Roest	Beau Snellink	Marcel Bosker
2024	Heerenveen	Chris Huizinga	Kars Jansman	Beau Snellink

== Women's Allround ==
Women's Medalist
Year	Venue	Gold	Silver	Bronze
1955	Zutphen	Rie Meijer	Ietje Louwen	Tiny Pol
1956	Zutphen	Rie Meijer	Ietje Louwen	Rie van Stijn
1957	Not held			
1958	Not held			
1959	Gorredijk	Rie Meijer	Annie Hulshof	Annemarie Wiegerink
1960	Not held			
1961	Not held			
1962	Amsterdam	Wil de Beer	Gré Broers	Riet Lokhorst
1963	Groningen	Wil de Beer	Annie van der Aa	Ietje Pfrommer-Louwen
1964	Deventer	Stien Kaiser	Wil van Wees	Wil de Beer
1965	Amsterdam	Stien Kaiser	Carry Geijssen	Ans Schut
1966	Deventer	Carry Geijssen	Wil Vel-de Beer	Stien Kaiser
1967	Amsterdam	Stien Kaiser	Carry Geijssen	Ans Schut
1968	Heerenveen	Stien Kaiser	Carry Geijssen	Ans Schut
1969	Heerenveen	Stien Kaiser	Ans Schut	Ellie van den Brom
1970	Deventer	Atje Keulen-Deelstra	Stien Kaiser	Ellie van den Brom
1971	Amsterdam	Stien Kaiser	Atje Keulen-Deelstra	Trijnie Rep
1972	Deventer	Atje Keulen-Deelstra	Stien Kaiser	Trijnie Rep
1973	Heerenveen	Atje Keulen-Deelstra	Trijnie Rep	Sippie Tigchelaar
1974	Assen	Atje Keulen-Deelstra	Sippie Tigchelaar	Sijtje van der Lende
1975	Assen	Sippie Tigchelaar	Sophie Westenbroek	Sijtje van der Lende
1976	Groningen	Sijtje van der Lende	Annie Borckink	Ina Steenbruggen
1977	Assen	Sijtje van der Lende	Haitske Pijlman	Sophie Westenbroek
1978	Eindhoven	Joke van Rijssel	Ina Steenbruggen	Sijtje van der Lende
1979	Heerenveen	Sijtje van der Lende	Ria Visser	Sophie Westenbroek
1980	Den Haag	Ria Visser	Annie Borckink	Sijtje van der Lende
1981	Assen	Alie Boorsma	Ina Steenbruggen	Annie Borckink
1982	Heerenveen	Alie Boorsma	Ria Visser	Thea Limbach
1983	Deventer	Ria Visser	Ina Steenbruggen	Alie Boorsma
1984	Groningen	Ria Visser	Yvonne van Gennip	Thea Limbach
1985	Alkmaar	Ria Visser	Marieke Stam	Thea Limbach
1986	Assen	Ria Visser	Marieke Stam	Petra Moolhuizen
1987	Deventer	Yvonne van Gennip	Petra Moolhuizen	Marieke Stam
1988	Alkmaar	Yvonne van Gennip	Marga Preuter	Hanneke de Vries
1989	Den Haag	Henriët van der Meer	Grietje Mulder	Hanneke de Vries
1990	Assen	Herma Meijer	Lia van Schie	Henriët van der Meer
1991	Alkmaar	Jolanda Grimbergen	Sandra Zwolle	Carla Zijlstra
1992	Alkmaar	Lia van Schie	Carla Zijlstra	Hanneke de Vries
1993	Assen	Carla Zijlstra	Barbara de Loor	Annamarie Thomas
1994	Den Haag	Annamarie Thomas	Barbara de Loor	Carla Zijlstra
1995	Assen	Annamarie Thomas	Tonny de Jong	Carla Zijlstra
1996	Den Haag	Annamarie Thomas	Tonny de Jong	Carla Zijlstra
1997	Assen	Tonny de Jong	Carla Zijlstra	Barbara de Loor
1998	Deventer	Tonny de Jong	Barbara de Loor	Sandra Zwolle
1999	Den Haag	Sandra 't Hart	Helen van Goozen	Irene Visser
2000	Den Haag	Renate Groenewold	Tonny de Jong	Annamarie Thomas
2001	Heerenveen	Tonny de Jong	Renate Groenewold	Barbara de Loor
2002	Alkmaar	Marja Vis	Wieteke Cramer	Sandra 't Hart
2003	Assen	Renate Groenewold	Annamarie Thomas	Marja Vis
2004	Eindhoven	Renate Groenewold	Gretha Smit	Wieteke Cramer
2005	Heerenveen	Moniek Kleinsman	Renate Groenewold	Ireen Wüst
2006	Utrecht	Wieteke Cramer	Tessa van Dijk	Jorien Voorhuis
2007	Heerenveen	Ireen Wüst	Renate Groenewold	Marja Vis
2008	Groningen	Ireen Wüst	Renate Groenewold	Paulien van Deutekom
2009	Heerenveen	Ireen Wüst	Elma de Vries	Paulien van Deutekom
2010	Heerenveen	Elma de Vries	Jorien Voorhuis	Marrit Leenstra
2011	Heerenveen	Marrit Leenstra	Jorien Voorhuis	Diane Valkenburg
2012	Heerenveen	Marrit Leenstra	Linda de Vries	Jorien Voorhuis
2013	Heerenveen	Jorien ter Mors	Ireen Wüst	Diane Valkenburg
2014	Amsterdam	Yvonne Nauta	Diane Valkenburg	Irene Schouten
2015	Heerenveen	Ireen Wüst	Jorien Voorhuis	Linda de Vries
2016	Heerenveen	Antoinette de Jong	Annouk van der Weijden	Linda de Vries
2017	Heerenveen	Marije Joling	Yvonne Nauta	Carlijn Achtereekte
2018	Heerenveen	Annouk van der Weijden	Linda de Vries	Melissa Wijfje
2019	Heerenveen	Carlijn Achtereekte	Joy Beune	Esmee Visser
2020	Heerenveen	Antoinette de Jong	Melissa Wijfje	Carlijn Achtereekte
2021	Heerenveen	Antoinette de Jong	Melissa Wijfje	Reina Anema
2022	Heerenveen	Merel Conijn	Joy Beune	Melissa Wijfje
2023	Heerenveen	Antoinette Rijpma-de Jong	Marijke Groenewoud	Joy Beune
2024	Heerenveen	Antoinette Rijpma-de Jong	Elisa Dul	Merel Conijn
