= 2015 KNSB Dutch Allround Championships =

Sport season from dutch

- Venue: Thialf ice skating rink, Heerenveen
- Dates: 27 December – 28 December 2014
- Competitors: 24 men 24 women

Medalist men
| 1st place, gold medalist(s) | | Sven Kramer | NED |
| 2nd place, silver medalist(s) | | Wouter olde Heuvel | NED |
| 3rd place, bronze medalist(s) | | Koen Verweij | NED |

Medalist women
| 1st place, gold medalist(s) | | Ireen Wüst | NED |
| 2nd place, silver medalist(s) | | Jorien Voorhuis | NED |
| 3rd place, bronze medalist(s) | | Linda de Vries | NED |

The 2015 KNSB Dutch Allround Championships in speed skating were held in Heerenveen at the Thialf ice skating rink from 27 December to 28 December 2014. The tournament was part of the 2014–2015 speed skating season. Sven Kramer and Irene Wüst won the allround titles.

== Schedule ==
| Saturday 27 December | Sunday 28 December |
|---|---|
| 500 meter women allround 500 meter men allround 3000 meter women allround 5000 meter men allround | 1500 meter women allround 1500 meter men allround 5000 meter women allround 10,000 meter men allround |

== Medalists ==
=== Allround ===
| Event | Gold | | Silver | | Bronze | |
|---|---|---|---|---|---|---|
| Men's allround | Sven Kramer | 149.353 | Wouter olde Heuvel | 149.859 | Koen Verweij | 150.881 |
| Women's allround | Ireen Wüst | 160.599 | Jorien Voorhuis | 162.436 | Linda de Vries | 162.766 |

=== Distance ===
| Distance | Gold | Silver | Bronze |
|---|---|---|---|
| Men's 500 m | Koen Verweij | Lucas van Alphen | Jan Blokhuijsen |
| Men's 1500 m | Wouter olde Heuvel | Koen Verweij | Sven Kramer |
| Men's 5000 m | Jorrit Bergsma | Sven Kramer | Wouter olde Heuvel |
| Men's 10000 m | Jorrit Bergsma | Sven Kramer | Wouter olde Heuvel |
| Women's 500 m | Ireen Wüst | Annouk van der Weijden | Jorien Voorhuis |
| Women's 1500 m | Ireen Wüst | Marrit Leenstra | Linda de Vries |
| Women's 3000 m | Ireen Wüst | Yvonne Nauta | Diane Valkenburg |
| Women's 5000 m | Carlijn Achtereekte | Jorien Voorhuis | Ireen Wüst |

== Classification ==
=== Men's allround ===
| Position | Skater | 500m | 5000m | 1500m | 10,000m | Total points Samalog |
|---|---|---|---|---|---|---|
| 1st place, gold medalist(s) | Sven Kramer | 36.70 (4) | 6:15.43 (2) | 1:46.69 (3) | 13:10.94 (2) | 149.353 |
| 2nd place, silver medalist(s) | Wouter olde Heuvel | 36.74 (6) | 6:18.50 (3) | 1:46.39 (1) | 13:16.13 (3) | 149.859 |
| 3rd place, bronze medalist(s) | Koen Verweij | 36.15 (1) | 6:26.13 (6) | 1:46.53 (2) | 13:28.15 (6) | 150.680 |
| 4 | Jorrit Bergsma | 38.25 (19) PR | 6:13.53 (1) | 1:48.25 (4) | 13:03.90 (1) | 150.881 |
| 5 | Douwe de Vries | 37.23 (11) | 6:20.00 (4) | 1:48.60 (6) | 13:21.48 (4) | 151.504 PR |
| 6 | Jos de Vos | 37.24 (12) PR | 6:24.09 (5) | 1:48.34 (5) | 13:27.88 (5) | 152.156 PR |
| 7 | Renz Rotteveel | 37.20 (10) | 6:33.87 (13) | 1:49.26 (10) | 13:44.95 (8) | 154.254 |
| 8 | Frank Vreugdenhil | 38.74 (22) | 6:27.04 (7) | 1:53.35 (22) | 13:30.73 (7) | 155.763 |
| 9 | Jan Blokhuijsen | 36.60 (3) | 6:29.90 (11) | 1:50.31 (16) | DNS | 112.360 |
| 10 | Thom van Beek | 37.92 (18) | 6:28.84 (10) | 1:48.92 (8) PR | | 113.110 |
| 11 | Willem Hoolwerf | 37.67 (15) PR | 6:27.78 (8) PR | 1:50.21 (14) | | 113.184 |
| 12 | Frank Hermans | 36.98 (8) | 6:35.43 (14) | 1:50.04 (13) | | 113.203 |
| 13 | Patrick Roest | 36.94 (7) | 6:37.45 (15) | 1:49.78 (12) | | 113.278 |
| 14 | Peter Groen | 36.70 (4) | 6:46.85 (19) | 1:48.88 (7) | | 113.678 |
| 15 | Lucas van Alphen | 36.22 (2) | 6:50.16 (21) | 1:49.54 (11) | | 113.749 |
| 16 | Evert Hoolwerf | 38.28 (20) | 6:30.18 (12) | 1:50.40 (17) | | 114.098 |
| 17 | Marcel Bosker | 37.77 (16) | 6:39.31 (16) | 1:50.29 (15) | | 114.464 |
| 18 | Simon Schouten | 38.44 (21) | 6:28.06 (9) | 1:51.67 (19) | | 114.469 |
| 19 | Jorjan Jorritsma | 37.84 (17) | 6:41.14 (17) | 1:51.92 (20) PR | | 115.260 |
| 20 | Thomas Geerdinck | 37.59 (13) | 6:42.04 (18) | 1:53.38 (23) | | 115.587 |
| 21 | Dedjer Wymenga | 37.16 (9) | 6:55.56 (23) PR | 1:50.85 (18) PR | | 115.666 |
| 22 | Maico Voets | 37.59 (13) PR | 6:51.80 (22) | 1:53.14 (21) PR | | 116.483 |
| NC | Bob de Jong | 39.19 (23) | DQ | 1:53.56 (24) | | 77.043 |
| NC | Wesly Dijs | DQ | 6:47.45 (20) | 1:49.23 (9) | | 77.155 |

=== Women's allround ===
| Position | Skater | 500m | 3000m | 1500m | 5000m | Total points Samalog |
|---|---|---|---|---|---|---|
| 1st place, gold medalist(s) | Ireen Wüst | 39.17 (1) | 4:02.27 (1) | 1:55.44 (1) | 7:05.71 (3) | 160.599 |
| 2nd place, silver medalist(s) | Jorien Voorhuis | 39.73 (3) | 4:06.17 (7) | 1:57.86 (6) | 7:03.92 (2) | 162.436 |
| 3rd place, bronze medalist(s) | Linda de Vries | 39.85 (4) | 4:06.08 (6) | 1:57.71 (3) | 7:06.67 (4) | 162.766 |
| 4 | Carlijn Achtereekte | 39.87 (5) | 4:05.70 (5) | 1:58.88 (10) | 7:03.72 (1) | 162.818 |
| 5 | Diane Valkenburg | 39.94 (6) | 4:05.30 (3) | 1:58.34 (9) | 7:10.38 (6) | 163.307 |
| 6 | Yvonne Nauta | 40.58 (13) PR | 4:05.11 (2) | 1:58.09 (7) | 7:09.67 (5) | 163.761 |
| 7 | Melissa Wijfje | 40.07 (7) | 4:07.71 (9) | 1:57.77 (4) | 7:16.35 (7) | 164.246 |
| 8 | Annouk van der Weijden | 39.68 (2) | 4:05.36 (4) | 2:00.14 (14) | 7:22.16 (8) | 164.835 |
| 9 | Antoinette de Jong | 40.32 (10) | 4:07.11 (8) | 2:00.40 (15) | | 121.638 |
| 10 | Irene Schouten | 40.24 (9) | 4:11.55 (12) | 1:59.57 (11) | | 122.021 |
| 11 | Sanneke de Neeling | 40.22 (8) | 4:16.23 (16) PR | 1:58.33 (8) | | 122.368 |
| 12 | Miranda Dekker | 40.45 (12) PR | 4:14.91 (14) PR | 1:59.81 (12) PR | | 122.871 |
| 13 | Reina Anema | 41.00 (15) | 4:11.83 (13) | 2:00.00 (13) | | 122.971 |
| 14 | Jade van der Molen | 41.82 (18) | 4:09.20 (11) PR | 2:00.89 (16) PR | | 123.649 |
| 15 | Manouk van Tol | 40.83 (14) | 4:20.78 (19) PR | 2:03.21 (18) | | 125.363 |
| 16 | Ineke Dedden | 41.88 (19) | 4:15.82 (15) | 2:03.21 (18) | | 125.586 |
| 17 | Esmee Visser | 42.40 (22) | 4:16.96 (17) | 2:04.00 (20) | | 126.559 |
| 18 | Roza Blokker | 41.77 (16) | 4:20.92 (20) | 2:04.49 (21) | | 126.752 |
| 19 | Esther Kiel | 41.88 (19) | 4:23.40 (21) | 2:05.25 (22) | | 127.530 |
| 20 | Natasja Roest | 42.20 (21) | 4:25.53 (22) | 2:06.48 (23) | | 128.615 |
| 21 | Sanne van der Schaar | 45.55 (23) | 4:18.12 (18) | 2:01.76 (17) | | 129.156 |
| NC | Marije Joling | 40.36 (11) | DQ | 1:57.78 (5) | | 79.620 |
| NC | Marrit Leenstra | DQ | 4:08.70 (10) | 1:56.44 (2) | | 80.263 |
| NC | Imke Vormeer | 41.77 (16) | 4:26.40 (23) | DNS | | 86.170 |
