= Netherlands at the 1984 Winter Olympics =

- Flag of the Netherlands
- IOC code: NED (HOL used at these Games)
- NOC: Dutch Olympic Committee

in Sarajevo
- Competitors: 13 (9 men, 4 women) in 2 sports
- Flag bearer: Hilbert van der Duim (speedskating)
- Medals: Gold 0 Silver 0 Bronze 0 Total 0

Winter Olympics appearances (overview)
- 1928; 1932; 1936; 1948; 1952; 1956; 1960; 1964; 1968; 1972; 1976; 1980; 1984; 1988; 1992; 1994; 1998; 2002; 2006; 2010; 2014; 2018; 2022; 2026

Athletes from the Netherlands competed at the 1984 Winter Olympics in Sarajevo, Yugoslavia.

== Bobsleigh ==
Men

Event	Athlete	Run 1		Run 2		Run 3		Run 4		Total	
Event	Athlete	Time	Rank	Time	Rank	Time	Rank	Time	Rank	Time	Rank
Two-man	Job van Oostrum; John Drost	52.86	15	53.58	22	52.79	18	52.76	15	3:31.99	16

== Speed skating ==
Men

Event	Athlete	Race	
Event	Athlete	Time	Rank
500 m	Geert Kuiper	39.13	16
500 m	Hein Vergeer	38.94	13
500 m	Jan Ykema	39.03	14
1000 m	Hilbert van der Duim	1:17.46	7
1000 m	Hein Vergeer	1:17.57	10
1000 m	Jan Ykema	1:18.81	20
1500 m	Hilbert van der Duim	1:59.77	7
1500 m	Frits Schalij	2:00.14	10
1500 m	Hein Vergeer	2:00.59	12
5000 m	Hilbert van der Duim	7:19.39	9
5000 m	Frits Schalij	7:28.17	17
5000 m	Robert Vunderink	7:25.19	14
10,000 m	Hilbert van der Duim	15:01.24	10
10,000 m	Yep Kramer	14:59.89	9
10,000 m	Robert Vunderink	15:14.45	17

Women

Event	Athlete	Race	
Event	Athlete	Time	Rank
500 m	Alie Boorsma	1:02.05	33
500 m	Thea Limbach	44.31	27
500 m	Ria Visser	45.05	30
1000 m	Alie Boorsma	1:28.40	23
1000 m	Yvonne van Gennip	1:25.36	6
1000 m	Thea Limbach	1:28.12	21
1500 m	Yvonne van Gennip	2:10.61	11
1500 m	Thea Limbach	2:10.35	9
1500 m	Ria Visser	2:11.06	13
3000 m	Yvonne van Gennip	4:34.80	5
3000 m	Thea Limbach	4:42.84	13
3000 m	Ria Visser	5:14.80	25
