= 2017 KNSB Dutch Allround Championships =

Sport season from dutch

- Venue: Thialf ice skating rink, Heerenveen
- Dates: 20 January – 22 January 2017
- Competitors: 20 men 20 women

Medalist men
1st place, gold medalist(s)		Jan Blokhuijsen	NED
2nd place, silver medalist(s)		Patrick Roest	NED
3rd place, bronze medalist(s)		Marcel Bosker	NED

Medalist women
1st place, gold medalist(s)		Marije Joling	NED
2nd place, silver medalist(s)		Yvonne Nauta	NED
3rd place, bronze medalist(s)		Carlijn Achtereekte	NED

The 2017 KNSB Dutch Allround Championships in speed skating were held in Heerenveen at the Thialf ice skating rink from 20 January to 22 January 2017. The tournament was part of the 2016–2017 speed skating season. Jan Blokhuijsen and Marije Joling won the allround titles.

== Schedule ==
Friday 20 January	Saturday 21 January	Sunday 22 January
500 meter women allround 500 meter men allround 3000 meter women allround 5000 meter men allround	1500 meter women allround 1500 meter men allround	10,000 meter men allround 5000 meter women allround

== Medalists ==
=== Allround ===
Event	Gold		Silver		Bronze	
Men's allround	Jan Blokhuijsen	150.219	Patrick Roest	150.917	Marcel Bosker	152.114
Women's allround	Marije Joling	163.450	Yvonne Nauta	163.715	Carlijn Achtereekte	163.881

=== Distance ===
Distance	Gold	Silver	Bronze
Men's 500 m	Koen Verweij	Patrick Roest	Jan Blokhuijsen
Men's 1500 m	Patrick Roest	Jan Blokhuijsen	Marcel Bosker
Men's 5000 m	Jan Blokhuijsen	Marcel Bosker	Patrick Roest
Men's 10000 m	Erik Jan Kooiman	Jan Blokhuijsen	Jos de Vos
Women's 500 m	Jorien ter Mors	Linda de Vries	Marije Joling
Women's 1500 m	Yvonne Nauta	Marije Joling	Annouk van der Weijden
Women's 3000 m	Yvonne Nauta	Marije Joling	Melissa Wijfje
Women's 5000 m	Carlijn Achtereekte	Yvonne Nauta	Annouk van der Weijden

== Classification ==
=== Men's allround ===
Position	Skater	Total points Samalog	500m	5000m	1500m	10,000m
1st place, gold medalist(s)	Jan Blokhuijsen	150.219	36.58 (3)	6:20.68 (1)	1:47.80 (2)	13:12.77 (2)
2nd place, silver medalist(s)	Patrick Roest	150.917	36.53 (2)	6:25.54 (3)	1:46.36 (1)	13:27.60 (5)
3rd place, bronze medalist(s)	Marcel Bosker	152.114	37.32 (7)	6:24.76 (2)	1:48.02 (3)	13:26.25 (4)
4	Jos de Vos	153.450	38.11 (13)	6:28.69 (4)	1:49.55 (5)	13:19.10 (3) PR
5	Thomas Geerdinck	154.437	36.81 (5)	6:38.88 (13)	1:51.31 (8)	13:32.722 (7) PR
6	Willem Hoofwerf	154.572	38.09 (12)	6:32.21 (8)	1:50.31 (7)	13:29.83 (6) PR
7	Chris Huizinga	155.045	37.36 (8) PR	6:31.72 (7)	1:49.56 (6)	13:59.86 (8) PR
8	Erik Jan Kooiman	155.840	40.35 (20) PR	6:28.87 (5)	1:51.75 (11)	13:07.06 (1)
9	Wesly Dijs	114.483	37.18 (6)	6:48.67 (17)	1:49.31 (4)	
10	Lex Dijkstra	114.531	37.93 (11)	6:34.18 (11)	1:51.55 (10)	
11	Arjan Stroetinga	114.903	38.78 (17)	6:29.70 (6)	1:51.46 (9)	
12	Evert Hoolwerf	115.759	39.05 (18)	6:33.09 (10)	1:52.20 (12)	
13	Kars Jansman	115.893	38.55 (16)	6:39.07 (14)	1:52.31 (14)	
14	Kees Heemskerk	115.923	37.86 (10)	6:46.20 (16)	1:52.33 (15)	
15	Remco Schouten	116.144	39.10 (19)	6:34.61 (12)	1:52.75 (17)	
16	Jeroen Janissen	116.175	38.27 (15)	6:44.62 (15)	1:52.33 (15)	
17	Olof Gerritsen	116.714	37.57 (9)	6:5.28 (19)	1:52.25 (13)	
18	Bart Vreugdenhil	117.440	38.17 (14)	6:52.70 (18)	1:55.00 (18)	
NC	Koen Verweij	75.726	36.45 (1)	6:32.76 (9)	WDR	
NC	Louis Hollaar	36.730	36.73 (4)	DNS		

=== Women's allround ===
Position	Skater	Total points Samalog	500m	3000m	1500m	5000m
1st place, gold medalist(s)	Marije Joling	163.450	39.98 (3)	4:07.78 (2)	1:58.46 (2)	7:06.88 (4)
2nd place, silver medalist(s)	Yvonne Nauta	163.715	40.70 (9)	4:06.54 (1)	1:58.20 (1)	7:05.25 (2)
3rd place, bronze medalist(s)	Carlijn Achtereekte	163.881	40.55 (7)	4:09.02 (4)	1:59.25 (7)	7:00.78 (1)
4	Annouk van der Weijden	164.140	40.11 (4)	4:11.65 (8)	1:58.62 (3)	7:05.49 (3)
5	Linda de Vries	164.188	39.68 (2)	4:09.79 (5)	1:58.70 (5)	7:13.11 (6)
6	Melissa Wijfje	164.881	40.55 (7)	4:08.37 (3)	1:58.64 (4)	7:13.90 (7)
7	Jorien Voorhuis	165.367	40.43 (6)	4:11.30 (7)	1:58.74 (6)	7:14.74 (8)
8	Reina Anema	166.732	41.97 (19)	4:10.40 (6)	2:00.16 (8)	7:09.76 (5)
9	Sanne van der Schaar	123.130	40.14 (5)	4:17.34 (11)	2:00.30 (9)	
10	Ineke Dedden	124.569	41.87 (18)	4:15.02 (10)	2:00.59 (10) PR	
11	Femke Markus	124.633	41.23 (14)	4:18.42 (12)	2:01.00 (11) PR	
12	Esmee Visser	125.160	42.26 (20)	4:12.42 (9)	2:02.49 (12)	
13	Roza Blokker	126.164	41.76 (17)	4:18.95 (13)	2:03.74 (14) PR	
14	Willemijn Cnossen	126.656	42.20 (13)	4:24.50 (15)	2:04.12 (17) PR	
15	Miranda Dekker	126.851	41.08 (11)	4:26.55 (16)	2:04.04 (16)	
16	Aveline Hijlkema	126.958	40.95 (10)	4:07.99 (17)	2:04.03 (15)	
17	Inge Mostert	127.586	41.67 (16) PR	4:24.30 (14) PR	2:05.60 (18)	
18	Annemarie Boer	130.613	41.44 (15)	4:29.36 (18)	2:12.84 (19)	
NC	Esther Kiel	82.390	41.18 (12)	DSQ	2:03.63 (13)	
NC	Jorien ter Mors	38.590	38.59 (1)	DNS		
