= 2014 KNSB Dutch Single Distance Championships – Women's 3000 m =

- Venue: Thialf, Heerenveen, Netherlands
- Date: 26 October 2013
- Competitors: 20 skaters

Medalist men
1st place, gold medalist(s)		Ireen Wüst	NED
2nd place, silver medalist(s)		Jorien ter Mors	NED
3rd place, bronze medalist(s)		Antoinette de Jong	NED

The women's 3000 meter at the 2014 KNSB Dutch Single Distance Championships took place in Heerenveen at the Thialf ice skating rink on Saturday 26 October 2013. Although this tournament was held in 2013, it was part of the 2013–2014 speed skating season.

There were 20 participants.

Title holder was Diane Valkenburg.

The first 5 skaters qualified for the next following 2013–14 ISU Speed Skating World Cup tournaments.

== Overview ==
=== Result ===
Rank	Skater	Time
1st place, gold medalist(s)	Ireen Wüst	4:02.77
2nd place, silver medalist(s)	Jorien ter Mors	4:04.07
3rd place, bronze medalist(s)	Antoinette de Jong	4:05.77 PR
4	Yvonne Nauta	4:05.83 PR
5	Jorien Voorhuis	4:06.10
6	Linda de Vries	4:07.53
7	Annouk van der Weijden	4:07.94
8	Diane Valkenburg	4:08.01
9	Carlijn Achtereekte	4:09.46 PR
10	Carien Kleibeuker	4:10.93
11	Pien Keulstra	4:11.24
12	Imke Vormeer	4:11.58 PR
13	Elma de Vries	4:11.82
14	Melissa Wijfje	4:11.86 PR
15	Rixt Meijer	4:12.12
16	Janneke Ensing	4:12.34
17	Lisa van der Geest	4:13.03 PR
18	Irene Schouten	4:15.63
19	Linda Bouwens	4:18.51
20	Reina Anema	4:23.86

=== Draw ===
Heat	Inner lane	Outer lane
1	Pien Keulstra	Elma de Vries
2	Lisa van der Geest	Linda Bouwens
3	Melissa Wijfje	Imke Vormeer
4	Irene Schouten	Carien Kleibeuker
5	Janneke Ensing	Reina Anema
6	Carlijn Achtereekte	Rixt Meijer
7	Antoinette de Jong	Yvonne Nauta
8	Jorien Voorhuis	Annouk van der Weijden
9	Diane Valkenburg	Linda de Vries
10	Ireen Wüst	Jorien ter Mors
