= 2017 KNSB Dutch Single Distance Championships – Women's 5000 m =

- Venue: Thialf, Heerenveen, Netherlands
- Date: 30 December 2016
- Competitors: 12 skaters

Medalist men
1st place, gold medalist(s)		Carien Kleibeuker	NED
2nd place, silver medalist(s)		Antoinette de Jong	NED
3rd place, bronze medalist(s)		Carlijn Achtereekte	NED

The women's 5000 meter at the 2017 KNSB Dutch Single Distance Championships took place in Heerenveen at the Thialf ice skating rink on Friday 30 December 2016. Although this tournament was held in 2016, it was part of the 2016–2017 speed skating season.

There were 12 participants.

Title holder was Carien Kleibeuker.

== Result ==
Rank	Skater	Time
1st place, gold medalist(s)	Carien Kleibeuker	6:58.78
2nd place, silver medalist(s)	Antoinette de Jong	6:59.79
3rd place, bronze medalist(s)	Carlijn Achtereekte	7:00.83
4	Yvonne Nauta	7:00.95
5	Irene Schouten	7:04.49
6	Esmee Visser	7:04.81 PR
7	Lisa van der Geest	7:05.07
8	Marije Joling	7:06.23
9	Linda de Vries	7:08.79
10	Jorien Voorhuis	7:09.51
11	Annouk van der Weijden	7:10.76
12	Melissa Wijfje	7:13.16
