= 2016 KNSB Dutch Single Distance Championships – Women's 1500 m =

- Venue: Thialf, Heerenveen, Netherlands
- Date: 27 December 2015
- Competitors: 22 skaters

Medalist men
1st place, gold medalist(s)		Jorien ter Mors	NED
2nd place, silver medalist(s)		Ireen Wüst	NED
3rd place, bronze medalist(s)		Marrit Leenstra	NED

The women's 1500 meter at the 2016 KNSB Dutch Single Distance Championships took place in Heerenveen at the Thialf ice skating rink on Sunday 27 December 2015. Although this tournament was held in 2015, it was part of the 2015–2016 speed skating season.

There were 22 participants.

Title holder was Ireen Wüst.

== Result ==
Rank	Skater	Time
1st place, gold medalist(s)	Jorien ter Mors	1:55.56
2nd place, silver medalist(s)	Ireen Wüst	1:56.82
3rd place, bronze medalist(s)	Marrit Leenstra	1:57.68
4	Marije Joling	1:58.18
5	Antoinette de Jong	1:58.79
6	Jorien Voorhuis	1:58.94
7	Melissa Wijfje	1:59.09
8	Annouk van der Weijden	1:59.26
9	Reina Anema	1:59.68 PR
10	Diane Valkenburg	1:59.97
11	Linda de Vries	2:00.00
12	Irene Schouten	2:00.24
13	Sanneke de Neeling	2:00.56
14	Yvonne Nauta	2:00.57
15	Carlijn Achtereekte	2:00.74
16	Esther Kiel	2:01.04 PR
17	Roxanne van Hemert	2:01.75
18	Sanne van der Schaar	2:02.83
19	Lotte van Beek	2:03.04
20	Julia Berentschot	2:03.62
21	Esmee Visser	2:04.07
22	Miranda Dekker	2:04.69
