= 2017 KNSB Dutch Single Distance Championships – Women's 1500 m =

- Venue: Thialf, Heerenveen, Netherlands
- Date: 28 December 2016
- Competitors: 20 skaters

Medalist men
1st place, gold medalist(s)		Ireen Wüst	NED
2nd place, silver medalist(s)		Jorien ter Mors	NED
3rd place, bronze medalist(s)		Marrit Leenstra	NED

The women's 1500 meter at the 2017 KNSB Dutch Single Distance Championships took place in Heerenveen at the Thialf ice skating rink on Wednesday 28 December 2016. Although this tournament was held in 2016, it was part of the 2016–2017 speed skating season.

There were 20 participants.

Title holder was Jorien ter Mors.

== Result ==
Rank	Skater	Time
1st place, gold medalist(s)	Ireen Wüst	1:57.19
2nd place, silver medalist(s)	Jorien ter Mors	1:57.47
3rd place, bronze medalist(s)	Marrit Leenstra	1:57.75
4	Sanneke de Neeling	1:58.87
5	Annouk van der Weijden	1:59.04
6	Antoinette de Jong	1:59.25
7	Marije Joling	1:59.27
8	Yvonne Nauta	1:59.59
9	Carlijn Achtereekte	1:59.63
10	Linda de Vries	2:00.01
11	Sanne van der Schaar	2:00.07 PR
12	Melissa Wijfje	2:00.54
13	Joy Beune	2:01.58
14	Jorien Voorhuis	2:01.78
15	Jutta Leerdam	2:02.44 PR
16	Sanne in 't Hof	2:02.63 PR
17	Reina Anema	2:02.78
18	Esmee Visser	2:02.79
19	Esther Kiel	2:03.13
20	Loes Adegeest	2:08.87
