= 2015 KNSB Dutch Single Distance Championships – Women's 3000 m =

- Venue: Thialf, Heerenveen, Netherlands
- Date: 1 November 2014
- Competitors: 20 skaters

Medalist men
1st place, gold medalist(s)		Ireen Wüst	NED
2nd place, silver medalist(s)		Jorien Voorhuis	NED
3rd place, bronze medalist(s)		Carlijn Achtereekte	NED

The women's 3000 meter at the 2015 KNSB Dutch Single Distance Championships took place in Heerenveen at the Thialf ice skating rink on Saturday 1 November 2014. Although this tournament was held in 2014, it was part of the 2014–2015 speed skating season.

There were 20 participants.

Title holder was Ireen Wüst.

There was qualification selection available for the next following 2014–15 ISU Speed Skating World Cup tournaments.

== Result ==
Rank	Skater	Time
1st place, gold medalist(s)	Ireen Wüst	4:04.50
2nd place, silver medalist(s)	Jorien Voorhuis	4:06.00
3rd place, bronze medalist(s)	Carlijn Achtereekte	4:07.13
4	Marije Joling	4:07.88
5	Carien Kleibeuker	4:08.01
6	Linda de Vries	4:08.41
7	Diane Valkenburg	4:08.62
8	Yvonne Nauta	4:09.44
9	Melissa Wijfje	4:09.56 PR
10	Rixt Meijer	4:09.92 PR
11	Marrit Leenstra	4:09.95
12	Antoinette de Jong	4:10.38
13	Lisa van der Geest	4:11.02
14	Jade van der Molen	4:11.35 PR
15	Irene Schouten	4:13.26
16	Reina Anema	4:13.62 PR
17	Annouk van der Weijden	4:13.74
18	Imke Vormeer	4:13.89
19	Miranda Dekker	4:15.71 PR
20	Janneke Ensing	4:17.10
