= 2017 KNSB Dutch Single Distance Championships – Women's 3000 m =

- Venue: Thialf, Heerenveen, Netherlands
- Date: 29 December 2016
- Competitors: 16 skaters

Medalist men
1st place, gold medalist(s)		Ireen Wüst	NED
2nd place, silver medalist(s)		Antoinette de Jong	NED
3rd place, bronze medalist(s)		Yvonne Nauta	NED

The women's 3000 meter at the 2017 KNSB Dutch Single Distance Championships took place in Heerenveen at the Thialf ice skating rink on Thursday 29 December 2016. Although this tournament was held in 2016, it was part of the 2016–2017 speed skating season.

There were 16 participants.

Title holder was Ireen Wüst.

== Overview ==
=== Result ===
Rank	Skater	Time
1st place, gold medalist(s)	Ireen Wüst	4:02.31
2nd place, silver medalist(s)	Antoinette de Jong	4:02.76
3rd place, bronze medalist(s)	Yvonne Nauta	4:04.50
4	Carlijn Achtereekte	4:04.81
5	Marije Joling	4:05.99
6	Irene Schouten	4:06.54
7	Annouk van der Weijden	4:06.72
8	Melissa Wijfje	4:08.15
9	Esmee Visser	4:08.60 PR
10	Linda de Vries	4:09.15
11	Jorien Voorhuis	4:11.31
12	Reina Anema	4:11.96
13	Lisa van der Geest	4:12.71
14	Jade van der Molen	4:17.05
15	Imke Vormeer	4:17.09
16	Esther Kiel	4:17.20

=== Draw ===
Heat	Inner lane	Outer lane
1	Jade van der Molen	Imke Vormeer
2	Jorien Voorhuis	Lisa van der Geest
3	Reina Anema	Yvonne Nauta
4	Irene Schouten	Esmee Visser
5	Carlijn Achtereekte	Esther Kiel
6	Antoinette de Jong	Marije Joling
7	Annouk van der Weijden	Linda de Vries
8	Melissa Wijfje	Ireen Wüst
