= 2016 KNSB Dutch Single Distance Championships – Women's 3000 m =

- Venue: Thialf, Heerenveen, Netherlands
- Date: 28 December 2015
- Competitors: 18 skaters

Medalist men
1st place, gold medalist(s)		Ireen Wüst	NED
2nd place, silver medalist(s)		Antoinette de Jong	NED
3rd place, bronze medalist(s)		Jorien Voorhuis	NED

The women's 3000 meter at the 2016 KNSB Dutch Single Distance Championships took place in Heerenveen at the Thialf ice skating rink on Monday 28 December 2015. Although this tournament was held in 2015, it was part of the 2015–2016 speed skating season.

There were 18 participants.

Title holder was Ireen Wüst.

== Overview ==
=== Result ===
Rank	Skater	Time
1st place, gold medalist(s)	Ireen Wüst	4:04.13
2nd place, silver medalist(s)	Antoinette de Jong	4:04.97
3rd place, bronze medalist(s)	Jorien Voorhuis	4:07.63
4	Marije Joling	4:07.72
5	Carien Kleibeuker	4:07.84
6	Irene Schouten	4:07.99
7	Reina Anema	4:09.01
8	Yvonne Nauta	4:09.12
9	Carlijn Achtereekte	4:09.33
10	Linda de Vries	4:09.44
11	Diane Valkenburg	4:10.42
12	Marrit Leenstra	4:11.34
13	Melissa Wijfje	4:11.57
14	Annouk van der Weijden	4:12.22
15	Lisa van der Geest	4:12.60
16	Esmee Visser	4:15.21
17	Esther Kiel	4:16.85
18	Ineke Dedden	4:16.95

=== Draw ===
Heat	Inner lane	Outer lane
1	Esmee Visser	Diane Valkenburg
2	Reina Anema	Esther Kiel
3	Carlijn Achtereekte	Ineke Dedden
4	Antoinette de Jong	Ireen Wüst
5	Marrit Leenstra	Melissa Wijfje
6	Lisa van der Geest	Carien Kleibeuker
7	Yvonne Nauta	Linda de Vries
8	Jorien Voorhuis	Irene Schouten
9	Marije Joling	Annouk van der Weijden
