= 2016 KNSB Dutch Allround Championships =

Sport season from dutch

- Venue: Thialf ice skating rink, Heerenveen
- Dates: 22 January – 24 January 2016
- Competitors: 24 men 25 women

Medalist men
1st place, gold medalist(s)		Jan Blokhuijsen	NED
2nd place, silver medalist(s)		Douwe de Vries	NED
3rd place, bronze medalist(s)		Patrick Roest	NED

Medalist women
1st place, gold medalist(s)		Antoinette de Jong	NED
2nd place, silver medalist(s)		Annouk van der Weijden	NED
3rd place, bronze medalist(s)		Linda de Vries	NED

The 2016 KNSB Dutch Allround Championships in speed skating were held in Heerenveen at the Thialf ice skating rink from 22 January to 24 January 2016. The tournament was part of the 2015–2016 speed skating season. Jan Blokhuijsen and Antoinette de Jong won the allround titles.

== Schedule ==
Friday 22 January	Saturday 23 January	Sunday 24 January
500 meter women allround 500 meter men allround	3000 meter women allround 5000 meter men allround	1500 meter women allround 1500 meter men allround 5000 meter women allround 10,000 meter men allround

== Medalists ==
=== Allround ===
Event	Gold		Silver		Bronze	
Men's allround	Jan Blokhuijsen	150.901	Douwe de Vries	151.857	Patrick Roest	152.484
Women's allround	Antoinette de Jong	162.332	Annouk van der Weijden	162.796 PR	Linda de Vries	164.069

=== Distance ===
Distance	Gold	Silver	Bronze
Men's 500 m	Peter Groen	Jan Blokhuijsen	Wesly Dijs
Men's 1500 m	Patrick Roest	Jan Blokhuijsen	Douwe de Vries
Men's 5000 m	Jan Blokhuijsen	Douwe de Vries	Arjan Stroetinga
Men's 10000 m	Arjan Stroetinga	Jan Blokhuijsen	Douwe de Vries
Women's 500 m	Antoinette de Jong	Annouk van der Weijden	Linda de Vries
Women's 1500 m	Linda de Vries	Antoinette de Jong	Melissa Wijfje
Women's 3000 m	Annouk van der Weijden	Antoinette de Jong	Linda de Vries
Women's 5000 m	Annouk van der Weijden	Antoinette de Jong	Yvonne Nauta

== Classification ==
=== Men's allround ===
Position	Skater	500m	5000m	1500m	10,000m	Total points Samalog
1st place, gold medalist(s)	Jan Blokhuijsen	36.83 (2)	6:22.18 (1)	1:48.00 (2)	13:17.07 (2)	150.901
2nd place, silver medalist(s)	Douwe de Vries	37.43 (7)	6:22.41 (2)	1:48.27 (3)	13:21.92 (3)	151.857
3rd place, bronze medalist(s)	Patrick Roest	37.13 (4)	6:28.80 (5)	1:46.83 (1)	13:37.28 (6)	152.484
4	Arjan Stroetinga	38.37 (17)	6:22.85 (3)	1:49.74 (10)	13:11.35 (1)	152.802 PR
5	Evert Hoolwerf	38.26 (16)	6:24.47 (4)	1:49.13 (8) PR	13:23.78 (4) PR	153.272 PR
6	Jos de Vos	37.48 (9)	6:32.99 (6)	1:48.66 (5)	13:30.84 (5)	153.541
7	Marcel Bosker	37.47 (8)	6:35.80 (9)	1:48.42 (4)	13:54.29 (8)	154.904
8	Willem Hoolwerf	38.24 (15)	6:34.03 (7)	1:49.70 (9) PR	13:47.90 (7)	155.604
9	Wesly Dijs	36.94 (3)	6:46.87 (13) PR	1:48.70 (6)		113.860
10	Thomas Geerdinck	37.20 (5)	6:44.61 (12)	1:52.42 (13)		115.604
11	Kars Jansman	38.06 (14) PR	6:39.04 (10)	1:52.18 (12)		115.357
12	Marwin Talsma	39.45 (22)	6:35.49 (8)	1:53.39 (16)		116.795
13	Jeroen Janissen	38.01 (13)	6:55.97 (15)	1:51.79 (11)		116.870
14	Joes Klijnsoon	38.61 (18)	6:54.12 (14)	1:53.07 (14)		117.712
15	Gerwin Coljé	38.61 (18)	6:59.09 (17)	1:53.60 (17)		118.385
16	Bart Vreugdenhil	37.83 (11)	7:02.29 (18)	1:55.11 (20)		118.429
17	Joep Kalverdijk	37.52 (10)	7:13.55 (20)	1:53.16 (15)		118.595
18	Olof Gerritsen	37.87 (12)	7:04.72 (19)	1:55.18 (21)		118.735
19	Mark Ooijevaar	40.49 (23)	6:44.29 (11)	1:54.72 (19)		119.159
20	Leon van Alstede	39.33 (21)	6:56.19 (16)	1:55.79 (22)		119.545
NC	Peter Groen	36.65 (1)	DQ	1:49.06 (7)		
NC	Tom Kant	37.26 (6)	DQ	1:53.99 (18)		
NC	Feiko Bierman	38.88 (20)	DQ	1:56.23 (23)		
NC	Renz Rotteveel	WDR				

=== Women's allround ===
Position	Skater	500m	3000m	1500m	5000m	Total points Samalog
1st place, gold medalist(s)	Antoinette de Jong	39.48 (1)	4:04.30 (2)	1:58.63 (2)	7:05.93 (2)	162.332
2nd place, silver medalist(s)	Annouk van der Weijden	39.95 (2)	4:04.07 (1)	1:59.14 (4)	7:04.55 (1)	162.796 PR
3rd place, bronze medalist(s)	Linda de Vries	40.33 (3)	4:06.24 (3)	1:58.21 (1)	7:12.96 (4)	164.069
4	Melissa Wijfje	40.67 (8)	4:09.25 (6)	1:58.96 (3)	7:13.15 (5)	165.179
5	Diane Valkenburg	40.62 (7)	4:10.57 (9)	1:59.32 (5)	7:13.27 (7)	165.481
6	Yvonne Nauta	41.17 (12)	4:08.65 (5)	2:00.12 (6)	7:09.30 (3)	165.581
7	Carlijn Achtereekte	40.50 (4)	4:08.17 (4)	2:01.14 (8)	7:13.61 (8)	165.602
8	Reina Anema	41.18 (13)	4:10.47 (8)	2:00.15 (7)	7:13.21 (6)	166.296
9	Irene Schouten	41.54 (17)	4:09.61 (7)	2:01.51 (9)		123.644
10	Sanne van der Schaar	40.55 (5)	4:15.80 (12) PR	2:02.16 (10)		123.903
11	Esmee Visser	41.76 (20)	4:12.54 (10)	2:02.23 (11)		124.593
12	Annemarie Boer	40.96 (9)	4:17.37 (14) PR	2:02.81 (12) PR		124.791
13	Miranda Dekker	41.06 (10)	4:20.32 (16)	2:03.20 (13)		125.512
14	Esther Kiel	41.52 (16)	4:17.12 (13)	2:04.46 (17)		125.859
15	Loes Adegeest	41.55 (18)	4:21.38 (18) PR	2:03.26 (14) PR		126.199
16	Femke Markus	41.84 (22)	4:20.22 (15)	2:03.79 (15)		126.473
17	Roza Blokker	41.64 (19)	4:20.97 (17)	2:04.55 (18)		126.651
18	Maike Brinksma	41.76 (20)	4:22.15 (19) PR	2:04.44 (16) PR		126.931
19	Mignon Goeree	41.16 (11)	4:29.77 (23) PR	2:04.81 (19) PR		127.724
20	Inge Mostert	41.97 (23)	4:25.39 (21)	2:05.51 (20)		128.037
21	Paulien Westerhof	41.98 (24)	4:25.24 (20) PR	2:05.97 (21)		128.176
22	Willemijn Cnossen	41.47 (14)	4:28.78 (22)	2:07.52 (22)		128.772
23	Natasja Roest	41.49 (15)	4:31.25 (24)	2:07.96 (23)		129.351
NC	Jorien Voorhuis	40.58 (6)	4:12.60 (11)	WDR		
NC	Julia Berentschot	WDR				
