= 2018 KNSB Dutch Single Distance Championships – Women's 5000 m =

- Venue: Thialf, Heerenveen, Netherlands
- Date: 29 October 2017
- Competitors: 13 skaters

Medalist men
1st place, gold medalist(s)		Antoinette de Jong	NED
2nd place, silver medalist(s)		Carien Kleibeuker	NED
3rd place, bronze medalist(s)		Carlijn Achtereekte	NED

The women's 5000 meter at the 2018 KNSB Dutch Single Distance Championships took place in Heerenveen at the Thialf ice skating rink on Wednesday 29 October 2017. Although this tournament was held in 2017, it was part of the 2017–2018 speed skating season.

There were 13 participants with one withdrawal.

Title holder was Carien Kleibeuker.

== Result ==
Rank	Skater	Time
1st place, gold medalist(s)	Antoinette de Jong	6:59.65
2nd place, silver medalist(s)	Carien Kleibeuker	7:00.38
3rd place, bronze medalist(s)	Carlijn Achtereekte	7:00.86
4	Irene Schouten	7:00.98
5	Esmee Visser	7:02.59 PR
6	Reina Anema	7:03.90
7	Femke Markus	7:10.97 PR
8	Melissa Wijfje	7:11.64
9	Annouk van der Weijden	7:12.34
10	Sanne in 't Hof	7:15.56 PR
11	Linda de Vries	7:15.71
12	Lisa van der Geest	7:26.68
–	Marije Joling	WDR

WDR = Withdrew
