= 2018 KNSB Dutch Allround Championships =

Sport season from dutch

- Venue: Thialf ice skating rink, Heerenveen
- Dates: 27 January – 28 January 2018

Medalist men
1st place, gold medalist(s)		Marcel Bosker	NED
2nd place, silver medalist(s)		Lex Dijkstra	NED
3rd place, bronze medalist(s)		Thomas Geerdinck	NED

Medalist women
1st place, gold medalist(s)		Annouk van der Weijden	NED
2nd place, silver medalist(s)		Linda de Vries	NED
3rd place, bronze medalist(s)		Melissa Wijfje	NED

The 2018 KNSB Dutch Allround Championships in speed skating were held in Heerenveen at the Thialf ice skating rink from 27 January to 28 January 2018. The tournament was part of the 2017–2018 speed skating season. Marcel Bosker and Annouk van der Weijden won the allround titles.

== Schedule ==
Saturday 27 January	Sunday 28 January
500 meter women allround 500 meter men allround 3000 meter women allround 5000 meter men allround	1500 meter women allround 1500 meter men allround 5000 meter women allround 10,000 meter men allround

== Medalists ==
=== Allround ===
Event	Gold		Silver		Bronze	
Men's allround	Marcel Bosker	151.051	Lex Dijkstra	153.483	Thomas Geerdinck	154.385
Women's allround	Annouk van der Weijden	163.662	Linda de Vries	164.609	Melissa Wijfje	166.088

=== Distance ===
Distance	Gold	Silver	Bronze
Men's 500 m	Tijmen Snel	Marcel Bosker	Thomas Geerdinck
Men's 1500 m	Marcel Bosker	Tijmen Snel	Chris Huizinga
Men's 5000 m	Marcel Bosker	Lex Dijkstra	Marwin Talsma
Men's 10000 m	Marcel Bosker	Lex Dijkstra	Marwin Talsma
Women's 500 m	Annouk van der Weijden	Linda de Vries	Aveline Hijlkema
Women's 1500 m	Linda de Vries	Annouk van der Weijden	Melissa Wijfje
Women's 3000 m	Annouk van der Weijden	Linda de Vries	Melissa Wijfje
Women's 5000 m	Annouk van der Weijden	Reina Anema	Sanne in 't Hof

== Classification ==
=== Men's allround ===
Position	Skater	Total points Samalog	500m	5000m	1500m	10,000m
1st place, gold medalist(s)	Marcel Bosker	151.051	36.73 (2)	6:23.29 (1)	1:47.58 (1)	13:22.65 (1)
2nd place, silver medalist(s)	Lex Dijkstra	153.483	37.92 (13)	6:26.69 (2)	1:50.02 (4)	13:24.43 (2) PR
3rd place, bronze medalist(s)	Thomas Geerdinck	154.385	36.81 (3)	6:38.62 (6)	1:50.90 (7)	13:34.94 (5)
4	Chris Huizinga	154.694	37.49 (9)	6:31.85 (4)	1:49.67 (3)	13:49.26 (6) PR
5	Jos de Vos	154.866	38.04 (14)	6:32.12 (5)	1:50.97 (8)	13:32.49 (4)
6	Gerwin Colje	156.766 PR	37.02 (5) PR	6:43.23 (8) PR	1:50.79 (6) PR	14:09.86 (7) PR
7	Marwin Talsma	157.022 PR	39.69 (19)	6:30.64 (3)	1:53.63 (16)	13:27.84 (3)
8	Louis Hollaar	157.571	37.13 (6)	6:41.69 (7) PR	1:51.32 (10)	14:23.33 (8)
9	Tijmen Snel	113.442	36.41 (1)	6:44.79 (10)	1:49.66 (2)	
10	Victor Ramler	115.703	37.84 (12)	6:43.90 (9) PR	1:52.42 (12)	
11	Thijs Roozen	116.052	36.87 (4)	7:03.39 (20)	1:50.53 (5)	
12	Jeroen Janissen	116.096	37.66 (10)	6:53.96 (13)	1:51.12 (9)	
13	Olaf Gerritsen	116.539	37.13 (6)	6:59.69 (16)	1:52.32 (11)	
14	Bart Vreugdenhil	116.966	38.07 (15)	6:50.90 (12)	1:53.42 (14)	
15	Jort Boomhouwer	117.423	37.39 (8)	7:00.53 (18)	1:53.94 (18)	
16	Jorick Duijzer	117.455	37.74 (11) PR	6:59.85 (17)	1:53.19 (13)	
17	Jan Hamers	117.803	38.18 (17) PR	6:55.13 (14)	1:54.33 (19)	
18	Hanno Dahmen	117.996	38.43 (18)	6:56.73 (15)	1:53.59 (15)	
19	Sjoerd Kleinhuis	118.580	38.09 (16) PR	7:00.84 (19)	1:55.22 (20)	
NC	Kees Heemskerk	79.008	DQ	6:50.68 (11)	1:53.82 (17)	

=== Women's allround ===
Position	Skater	Total points Samalog	500m	3000m	1500m	5000m
1st place, gold medalist(s)	Annouk van der Weijden	163.662	40.02 (1)	4:07.89 (1)	1:58.63 (2)	7:07.84 (1)
2nd place, silver medalist(s)	Linda de Vries	164.609	40.05 (2)	4:09.86 (2)	1:58.11 (1)	7.15.46 (4)
3rd place, bronze medalist(s)	Melissa Wijfje	166.088	40.84 (4)	4:10.85 (3)	1:59.16 (3)	7:17.20 (5)
4	Sanne in 't Hof	166.963	40.93 (5)	4:13.10 (4)	2:00.97 (4)	7:15.27 (3)
5	Reina Anema	168.247	42.04 (14)	4:14.31 (5)	2:01.09 (5)	7:14.59 (2)
6	Roza Blokker	169.199	41.36 (8)	4:15.75 (6) PR	2:02.82 (8) PR	7:22.74 (6) PR
7	Femke Markus	169.571 PR	41.59 (11)	4:16.82 (7)	2:01.93 (6)	7:25.35 (7)
8	Aveline Hijlkema	170.499	40.57 (3)	4.20.61 (8)	2:02.65 (7)	7:36.11 (8) PR
9	Esther Kiel	126.109	41.26 (7)	4:21.44 (9)	2:03.83 (9)	
10	Muriël Meijer	127.674	41.42 (9)	4:28.75 (13)	2:04.39 (11)	
11	Natasja Roest	127.744	41.55 (10)	4:29.29 (14)	2:03.94 (10)	
12	Willemijn Cnossen	128.128	41.64 (12)	4:27.23 (11)	2:05.85 (13)	
13	Robin van Leeuwen	129.063	42.76 (18)	4:26.34 (10)	2:05.74 (12) PR	
14	Ariane Smit	130.634	41.07 (6)	4:39.07 (16)	2:09.16 (15)	
15	Marit Steunenberg	131.158	41.82 (18)	4:40.91 (18)	2:07.56 (14)	
16	Sandra Dekker	131.893	42.25 (15)	4:39.20 (17)	2:09.33 (16)	
17	Eva van Til	132.216	42.49 (16) PR	4:35.36 (15)	2:11.50 (18)	
18	Britt de Boer	135.194	43.52 (19)	4:47.39 (19)	2:11.33 (17)	
19	Tessa Oudman	137.264	42.63 (17)	4:59.81 (20)	2:14.00 (19)	
20	Lilian Temmink	138.697	44.34 (17)	4:28.21 (12)	2:28.97 (20)	
