= Netherlands at the 1964 Winter Olympics =

- Flag of the Netherlands
- IOC code: NED
- NOC: Dutch Olympic Committee

in Innsbruck
- Competitors: 6 (4 men, 2 women) in 2 sports
- Flag bearer: Ard Schenk (speedskating)
- Medals: Gold 1 Silver 1 Bronze 0 Total 2

Winter Olympics appearances (overview)
- 1928; 1932; 1936; 1948; 1952; 1956; 1960; 1964; 1968; 1972; 1976; 1980; 1984; 1988; 1992; 1994; 1998; 2002; 2006; 2010; 2014; 2018; 2022; 2026

Athletes from the Netherlands competed at the 1964 Winter Olympics in Innsbruck, Austria.

== Medalists ==
Medal	Name	Sport	Event
Gold	Sjoukje Dijkstra	Figure skating	Ladies' singles
Silver	Kees Verkerk	Speed skating	Men's 1500 metres

== Figure skating ==
Athlete	Event	CF	FS	Points	Places	Final rank
Wouter Toledo	Men's singles	DNS	–	–	–	DNS
Sjoukje Dijkstra	Women's singles	1	1	2018.5	9	1st place, gold medalist(s)

== Speed skating ==
Men

Event	Athlete	Race	
Event	Athlete	Time	Rank
1500 m	Rudi Liebrechts	2:12.8	10
1500 m	Ard Schenk	2:13.4	13
1500 m	Kees Verkerk	2:10.6	2nd place, silver medalist(s)
5000 m	Rudi Liebrechts	7:50.9	8
5000 m	Peter Nottet	8:26.1	34
5000 m	Kees Verkerk	7:51.1	9
10,000 m	Rudi Liebrechts	16:08.6	4
10,000 m	Kees Verkerk	16:53.4	16

Women

Event	Athlete	Race	
Event	Athlete	Time	Rank
1000 m	Willy de Beer	1:40.1	17
1500 m	Willy de Beer	2:34.0	16
3000 m	Willy de Beer	5:49.9	27
