= 2016 KNSB Dutch Single Distance Championships – Women's 5000 m =

- Venue: Thialf, Heerenveen, Netherlands
- Date: 29 December 2015
- Competitors: 12 skaters

Medalist men
1st place, gold medalist(s)		Carien Kleibeuker	NED
2nd place, silver medalist(s)		Irene Schouten	NED
3rd place, bronze medalist(s)		Lisa van der Geest	NED

The women's 5000 meter at the 2016 KNSB Dutch Single Distance Championships took place in Heerenveen at the Thialf ice skating rink on Sunday 29 December 2015. Although this tournament was held in 2015, it was part of the 2015–2016 speed skating season.

There were 12 participants.

Title holder was Carien Kleibeuker.

== Result ==
Rank	Skater	Time
1st place, gold medalist(s)	Carien Kleibeuker	6:58.88
2nd place, silver medalist(s)	Irene Schouten	7:03.71
3rd place, bronze medalist(s)	Lisa van der Geest	7:06.30
4	Antoinette de Jong	7:07.55
5	Carlijn Achtereekte	7:10.19
6	Jorien Voorhuis	7:11.58
7	Linda de Vries	7:11.87
8	Reina Anema	7:12.32 PR
9	Yvonne Nauta	7:15.02
10	Melissa Wijfje	7:16.12 PR
–	Rixt Meijer	WDR
–	Diane Valkenburg	WDR

WDR = Withdrew
