= 2018 KNSB Dutch Single Distance Championships – Women's 3000 m =

- Venue: Thialf, Heerenveen, Netherlands
- Date: 27 October 2017
- Competitors: 20 skaters

Medalist men
1st place, gold medalist(s)		Antoinette de Jong	NED
2nd place, silver medalist(s)		Ireen Wüst	NED
3rd place, bronze medalist(s)		Irene Schouten	NED

The women's 3000 meter at the 2018 KNSB Dutch Single Distance Championships took place in Heerenveen at the Thialf ice skating rink on Friday 27 October 2017. Although this tournament was held in 2017, it was part of the 2017–2018 speed skating season.

There were 20 participants.

Title holder was Ireen Wüst.

== Overview ==
=== Result ===
Rank	Skater	Time
1st place, gold medalist(s)	Antoinette de Jong	4:05.59
2nd place, silver medalist(s)	Ireen Wüst	4:06.13
3rd place, bronze medalist(s)	Irene Schouten	4:06.31
4	Carlijn Achtereekte	4:06.42
5	Carien Kleibeuker	4:09.55
6	Marije Joling	4:09.63
7	Melissa Wijfje	4:09.69
8	Reina Anema	4:09.88
9	Linda de Vries	4:10.13
10	Annouk van der Weijden	4:10.51
11	Esmee Visser	4:10.55
12	Femke Markus	4:11.61
13	Sanne in 't Hof	4:13.53 PR
14	Ineke Dedden	4:15.54
15	Aveline Hijlkema	4:17.73 PR
16	Elma de Vries	4:17.79
17	Roza Blokker	4:20.01
18	Loes Adegeest	4:22.69
19	Sterre Jonkers	4:23.73
20	Natasja Roest	4:23.97 PR

=== Draw ===
Heat	Inner lane	Outer lane
1	Loes Adegeest	Natasja Roest
2	Aveline Hijlkema	Sanne in 't Hof
3	Roza Blokker	Sterre Jonkers
4	Elma de Vries	Femke Markus
5	Esmee Visser	Carien Kleibeuker
6	Linda de Vries	Reina Anema
7	Ineke Dedden	Marije Joling
8	Carlijn Achtereekte	Annouk van der Weijden
9	Irene Schouten	Antoinette de Jong
10	Ireen Wüst	Melissa Wijfje
