= Liebrechts =

Liebrechts is a surname. Notable people with the surname include:

- Charles Liebrechts
- Rudie Liebrechts
