= 2019 KNSB Dutch Allround Championships =

Sport season from dutch

- Venue: Thialf ice skating rink, Heerenveen
- Dates: 26 January – 27 January 2019

Medalist men
1st place, gold medalist(s)		Douwe de Vries	NED
2nd place, silver medalist(s)		Marcel Bosker	NED
3rd place, bronze medalist(s)		Chris Huizinga	NED

Medalist women
1st place, gold medalist(s)		Carlijn Achtereekte	NED
2nd place, silver medalist(s)		Joy Beune	NED
3rd place, bronze medalist(s)		Esmee Visser	NED

The 2019 KNSB Dutch Allround Championships in speed skating were held in Heerenveen at the Thialf ice skating rink from 26 January to 27 January 2019. The tournament was part of the 2018–2019 speed skating season. Douwe de Vries and Carlijn Achtereekte won the allround titles.

== Schedule ==
Saturday 26 January	Sunday 27 January
500 meter women allround 500 meter men allround 3000 meter women allround 5000 meter men allround	1500 meter women allround 1500 meter men allround 5000 meter women allround 10,000 meter men allround

== Medalists ==
=== Allround ===
Event	Gold		Silver		Bronze	
Men's allround	Douwe de Vries	148.168	Marcel Bosker	148.818	Chris Huizinga	151.611
Women's allround	Carlijn Achtereekte	159.685	Joy Beune	159.957	Esmee Visser	162.250

=== Distance ===
Distance	Gold	Silver	Bronze
Men's 500 m	Tijmen Snel	Louis Hollaar	Thomas Geerdinck
Men's 1500 m	Douwe de Vries	Marcel Bosker	Chris Huizinga
Men's 5000 m	Douwe de Vries	Marcel Bosker	Jos de Vos
Men's 10000 m	Douwe de Vries	Marcel Bosker	Chris Huizinga
Women's 500 m	Joy Beune	Carlijn Achtereekte	Melissa Wijfje
Women's 1500 m	Joy Beune	Carlijn Achtereekte	Melissa Wijfje
Women's 3000 m	Esmee Visser	Carlijn Achtereekte	Joy Beune
Women's 5000 m	Esmee Visser	Carlijn Achtereekte	Joy Beune

== Classification ==
=== Men's allround ===
Position	Skater	Total points Samalog	500m	5000m	1500m	10,000m
1st place, gold medalist(s)	Douwe de Vries	148.168	37.14 (8)	6:12.47 (1) PR	1:45.08 (1) PR	12:55.10 (1) PR
2nd place, silver medalist(s)	Marcel Bosker	148.818 PR	36.51 (5)	6:13.45 (2) PR	1:45.74 (2)	13:14.34 (2)
3rd place, bronze medalist(s)	Chris Huizinga	151.611 PR	37.05 (7) PR	6:24.28 (4)	1:47.52 (3) PR	13:25.87 (3) PR
4	Thomas Geerdinck	151.855 PR	36.60 (3)	6:28.83 (5)	1:48.40 (8) PR	13:30.79 (5) PR
5	Jos de Vos	152.579	37.63 (12)	6:24.03 (3)	1:48.26 (7)	13:29.20 (4)
6	Tjerk de Boer	153.213 PR	36.37 (4)	6:34.38 (8) PR	1:47.92 (5) PR	13:48.64 (7) PR
7	Tijmen Snel	154.509 PR	35.75 (1) PR	6:41.34 (13) PR	1:47.97 (6) PR	14:12.71 (8) PR
8	Lex Dijkstra	155.100	38.19 (17)	6:31.11 (6)	1:50.14 (11)	13:41.72 (6)
	Louis Hollaar	111.461	36.23 (2) PR	6:33.48 (7) PR	1:47.65 (4) PR	WDR
9	Gerwin Colje	112.820	36.55 (6) PR	6:39.24 (11) PR	1:49.04 (9) PR	
10	Jorick Duijzer	114.046	37.15 (9) PR	6:43.83 (14) PR	1:49.54 (10) PR	
11	Victor Ramler	114.333	37.43 (11) PR	6:39.87 (12)	1:50.75 (13) PR	
12	Jeroen Janissen	114.721	37.89 (13)	6:37.88 (10) PR	1:51.13 (14)	
13	Jort Boomhouwer	115.149	37.25 (10)	6:50.59 (17) PR	1:50.52 (12) PR	
14	Marwin Talsma	115.727	39.10 (19)	6:35.71 (9)	1:51.17 (15)	
15	Wiebe Stassen	116.141	38.08 (15) PR	6:49.68 (16) PR	1:51.28 (16) PR	
16	Jan Hamers	116.969	37.92 (14)	6:57.36 (18)	1:51.94 (17)	
17	André Los	117.189	38.75 (18)	6:46.19 (15)	1:53.46 (20) PR	
18	Wesley Hollenberg	117.476	38.12 (16) PR	6:58.30 (20)	1:52.58 (18) PR	
19	Sjoerd Kleinhuis	131.318	51.85 (20)	6:57.88 (19)	1:53.04 (19)	

=== Women's allround ===
Position	Skater	Total points Samalog	500m	3000m	1500m	5000m
1st place, gold medalist(s)	Carlijn Achtereekte	159.685	39.65 (2) PR	4:02.81 (2)	1:55.76 (2) PR	6:49.81 (2) PR
2nd place, silver medalist(s)	Joy Beune	159.957 PR	39.29 (1)	4:03.20 (3)	1:54.72 (1)	6:58.94 (3) PR
3rd place, bronze medalist(s)	Esmee Visser	162.250 PR	41.82 (17)	4:02.72 (1)	1:57.69 (5) PR	6:47.47 (1) PR/BR
4	Melissa Wijfje	162.275	39.96 (3)	4:05.04 (4)	1:56.17 (3)	7:07.52 (5)
5	Reina Anema	163.496	40.96 (12)	4:06.73 (5)	1:57.35 (4) PR	7:02.99 (4)
6	Roza Blokker	164.704 PR	40.49 (7) PR	4:08.06 (6) PR	1:59.24 (7) PR	7:11.25 (6) PR
7	Sanne in 't Hof	165.437 PR	40.54 (8) PR	4:09.56 (7) PR	1:59.50 (10) PR	7:14.71 (8)
8	Esther Kiel	165.600 PR	40.59 (9) PR	4:11.51 (8) PR	1:59.18 (6) PR	7:13.66 (7)
9	Aveline Hijlkema	122.491	40.28 (5)	4:14.39 (9)	1:59.44 (8)	
10	Marit Steunenberg	123.653	40.10 (4) PR	4:22.40 (15) PR	1:59.46 (9) PR	
11	Femke Markus	124.411	41.25 (13)	4:16.83 (10)	2:01.07 (11)	
12	Muriël Meijer	124.434	40.39 (6) PR	4:21.83 (13) PR	2:01.22 (12) PR	
13	Roos Markus	125.650	40.90 (11) PR	4:21.78 (12) PR	2:03.36 (14) PR	
14	Sandra Dekker	126.176	41.43 (14)	4:22.20 (14) PR	2:03.14 (13) PR	
15	Sterre Jonkers	127.329	42.55 (19)	4:20.54 (11)	2:04.07 (15)	
16	Ariane Smit	128.276	40.75 (10) PR	4:36.06 (18)	2:04.55 (16) PR	
17	Naomi van der Werf	128.833	41.55 (15)	4:30.86 (16)	2:06.42 (17)	
18	Isa Merkuur	129.731	42.19 (18) PR	4:31.03 (17)	2:07.11 (18) PR	
19	Myrte Sandu	131.300	41.67 (16)	4:41.46 (20)	2:08.16 (19) PR	
20	Britt de Boer	132.424	42.16 (20)	4:40.99 (19)	2:08.95 (20) PR	
