= 2020 KNSB Dutch Allround Championships =

Sport season from dutch

- Venue: Thialf ice skating rink, Heerenveen
- Dates: 25 January – 26 January 2020
- Competitors: 20 men 20 women

Medalist men
1st place, gold medalist(s)		Jan Blokhuijsen	NED
2nd place, silver medalist(s)		Marcel Bosker	NED
3rd place, bronze medalist(s)		Douwe de Vries	NED

Medalist women
1st place, gold medalist(s)		Antoinette de Jong	NED
2nd place, silver medalist(s)		Melissa Wijfje	NED
3rd place, bronze medalist(s)		Carlijn Achtereekte	NED

The 2020 KNSB Dutch Allround Championships in speed skating were held in Heerenveen at the Thialf ice skating rink from 25 January to 26 January 2020. The tournament was part of the 2019–2020 speed skating season. Jan Blokhuijsen and Antoinette de Jong won the allround titles.

== Schedule ==
Saturday 25 January	Sunday 26 January
500 meter women allround 500 meter men allround 3000 meter women allround 5000 meter men allround	1500 meter women allround 1500 meter men allround 5000 meter women allround 10,000 meter men allround

== Medalists ==
=== Allround ===
Event	Gold		Silver		Bronze	
Men's allround	Jan Blokhuijsen	149.206	Marcel Bosker	149.721	Douwe de Vries	150.027
Women's allround	Antoinette de Jong	159.544	Melissa Wijfje	160.408 PR	Carlijn Achtereekte	161.502

=== Distance ===
Distance	Gold	Silver	Bronze
Men's 500 m	Thomas Geerdinck	Louis Hollaar	Tjerk de Boer
Men's 1500 m	Jan Blokhuijsen	Marcel Bosker	Douwe de Vries
Men's 5000 m	Jan Blokhuijsen	Marcel Bosker / Douwe de Vries	
Men's 10000 m	Douwe de Vries	Jan Blokhuijsen	Marcel Bosker
Women's 500 m	Antoinette de Jong	Carlijn Achtereekte	Joy Beune
Women's 1500 m	Melissa Wijfje	Antoinette de Jong	Joy Beune
Women's 3000 m	Antoinette de Jong	Carlijn Achtereekte	Melissa Wijfje
Women's 5000 m	Carlijn Achtereekte	Antoinette de Jong	Melissa Wijfje

== Classification ==
=== Men's allround ===
Position	Skater	Total points Samalog	500m	5000m	1500m	10,000m
1st place, gold medalist(s)	Jan Blokhuijsen	149.206	36.47 (4)	6:18.02 (1)	1:46.51 (1)	13:08.63 (2)
2nd place, silver medalist(s)	Marcel Bosker	149.721	36.75 (5)	6:18.32 (2)	1:46.74 (2)	13:11.18 (3)
3rd place, bronze medalist(s)	Douwe de Vries	150.027	37.21 (9)	6:19.55 (3)	1:46.74 (2)	13:05.65 (1)
4	Chris Huizinga	151.955	37.12 (6)	6:24.28 (5)	1:48.47 (5)	13:25.03 (6)
5	Thomas Geerdinck	152.304	35.50 (1) PR	6:35.87 (7)	1:49.75 (6)	13:32.68 (7)
6	Kars Jansman	152.661 PR	38.21 (17)	6:20.74 (4) PR	1:49.96 (7) PR	13:14.48 (4)
7	Lex Dijkstra	153.395 PR	37.48 (13)	6:27.62 (6)	1:50.86 (8)	13:24.01 (5) PR
8	Tjerk de Boer	155.000	36.31 (3)	6:46.49 (13)	1:47.02 (4) PR	14:07.37 (8)
9	Victor Ramler	114.609	37.46 (10)	6:38.63 (8)	1:51.86 (13)	
10	Jorick Duijzer	115.121	37.47 (11)	6:45.11 (11)	1:51.42 (10)	
11	Jos de Vos	115.304	37.68 (14)	6:43.51 (9)	1:51.82 (12)	
12	Teun de Wit	115.346	37.13 (8)	6:49.26 (16)	1:51.87 (14)	
13	Yves Vergeer	115.359	37.69 (15)	6:43.53 (10)	1:51.95 (15) PR	
14	Lasse Hiddink	115.623	37.71 (16) PR	6:47.77 (15) PR	1:51.41 (9) PR	
15	Sjoerd Kleinhuis	115.946	37.47 (11) PR	6:50.63 (17) PR	1:52.24 (16)	
16	Max Visscher	116.205	38.22 (18) PR	6:47.19 (14) PR	1:51.80 (11) PR	
17	Roel Boek	117.393	38.87 (20)	6:45.80 (12)	1:53.83 (17)	
18	Jort Boomhouwer	118.211	37.12 (6)	7:04.21 (18)	1:56.01 (18)	
NC	Louis Hollaar	35.890	35.89 (2)	DNS		
NC	Marwin Talsma	38.780	38.78 (19)	DNS		

=== Women's allround ===
Position	Skater	Total points Samalog	500m	3000m	1500m	5000m
1st place, gold medalist(s)	Antoinette de Jong	159.544	368.94 (1)	4:00.66 (1)	1:55.94 (2)	6:58.38 (2)
2nd place, silver medalist(s)	Melissa Wijfje	160.408 PR	39.17 (2) PR	4:02.87 (3)	1:54.94 (1)	7:04.47 (3)
3rd place, bronze medalist(s)	Carlijn Achtereekte	161.502	40.15 (4)	4:02.84 (2)	1:57.70 (5)	6:56.46 (1)
4	Joy Beune	162.108	39.43 (3)	4:06.10 (6)	1:56.08 (3)	7:09.69 (5)
5	Reina Anema	162.441 PR	40.38 (8) PR	4:03.28 (4)	1:57.02 (4)	7:05.09 (4)
6	Esther Kiel	165.897	40.28 (6) PR	4:11.89 (7)	2:00.30 (9)	7:15.36 (6)
7	Roza Blokker	166.336	40.70 (12)	4:11.96 (8)	1:59.08 (6)	7:19.50 (7)
8	Aveline Hijlkema	166.474 PR	40.31 (7)	4:12.28 (9)	2:00.05 (7)	7:21.02 (8)
9	Paulien Verhaar	123.123	40.38 (8) PR	4:15.90 (12)	2:00.28 (8)	
10	Sanne in 't Hof	123.962	40.94 (14)	4:15.04 (11)	2:01.55 (12)	
11	Sterre Jonkers	124.666	42.17 (19)	4:13.28 (10)	2:00.85 (10) PR	
12	Muriël Meijer	124.824	40.52 (11)	4:23.15 (16)	2:01.34 (11)	
13	Roos Markus	125.676	40.46 (10) PR	4:25.62 (18)	2:02.84 (13) PR	
14	Ariane Smit	126.330	41.62 (17)	4:21.24 (14)	2:03.51 (15) PR	
15	Marit Steunenberg	126.468	40.80 (13)	4:27.39 (20)	2:03.31 (14)	
16	Naomi van der Werf	126.811	41.12 (15) PR	4:24.05 (17)	2:05.05 (16)	
17	Famke Minnee	128.183	41.93 (18)	4:25.82 (19) PR	2:05.85 (17)	
18	Eline Jansen	129.756	43.08 (20)	4:22.60 (15)	2:08.73 (18)	
NC	Merel Conijn	83.436	40.16 (5) PR	4:19.66 (13)	DQ	
NC	Esmee Visser	82.185	41.42 (16) PR	4:04.59 (5)	DNS	
