= Melissa Wijfje =

Dutch speed skater (born 1995)

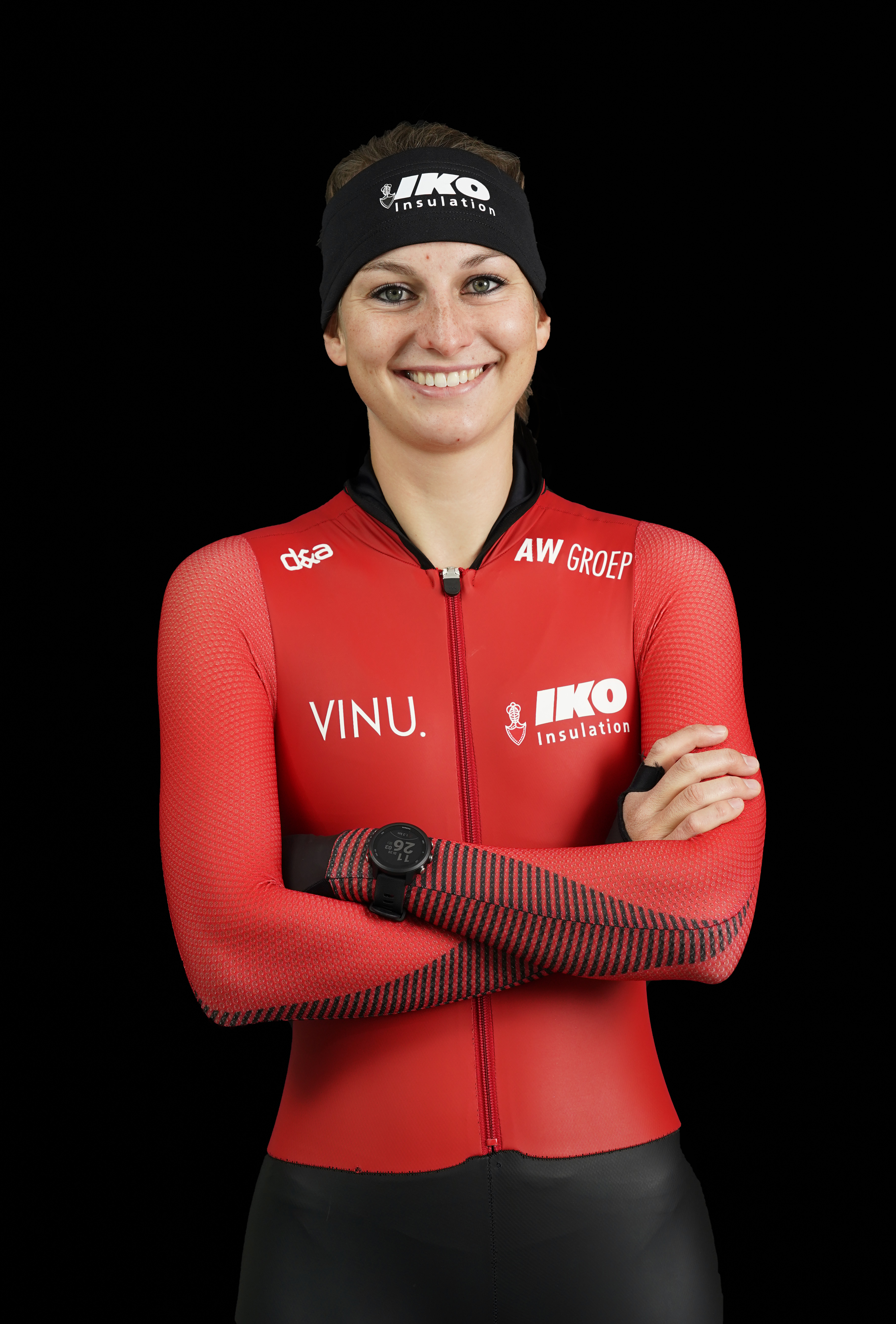
- Wijfje in 2020

Personal information
- Nationality: Dutch
- Born: 21 July 1995 (age 30) Ter Aar, Netherlands

Sport
- Country: Netherlands
- Sport: Speed skating
- Event(s): 1500 m, 3000 m
- Turned pro: 2013
- Retired: 2026
Medal record
Women's speed skating
Representing the Netherlands
World Single Distances Championships
Silver medal – second place	2020 Salt Lake City	Team pursuit
European Championships
Gold medal – first place	2018 Kolomna	Team pursuit
Gold medal – first place	2020 Heerenveen	Team pursuit
Bronze medal – third place	2020 Heerenveen	Mass start
Junior World Championships
Gold medal – first place	2014 Bjugn	1500m
Gold medal – first place	2015 Warsaw	1500m
Gold medal – first place	2015 Warsaw	3000m
Gold medal – first place	2015 Warsaw	Mass start
Gold medal – first place	2015 Warsaw	Allround
Silver medal – second place	2014 Bjugn	1500m
Silver medal – second place	2014 Bjugn	3000m
Silver medal – second place	2014 Bjugn	Allround

Melissa Wijfje (born 21 July 1995) is a retired Dutch allround speed skater who specialized in the middle and long distances. She is a two-time European champion in the team pursuit.

== Career ==
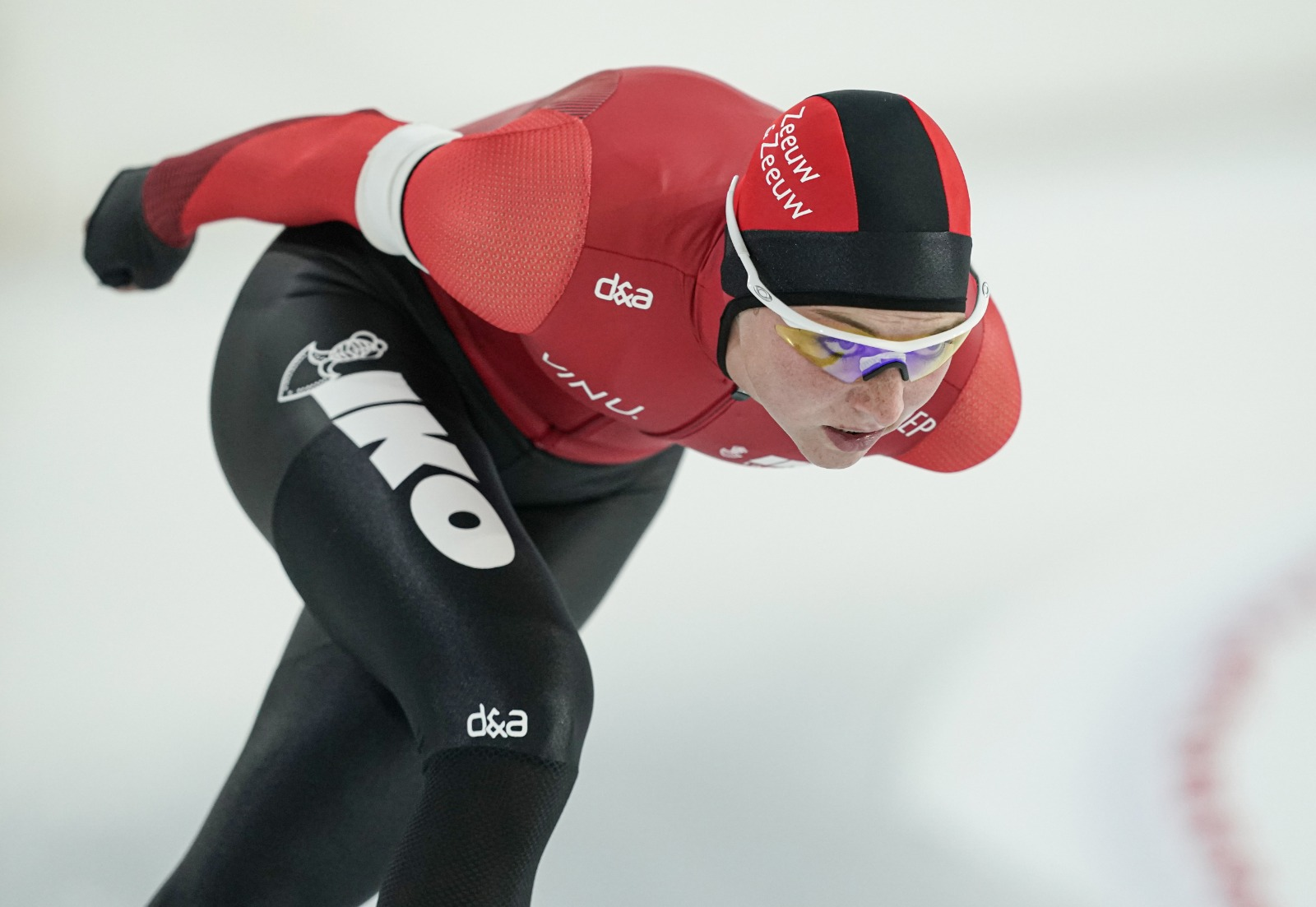
Wijfje in 2020

In 2015 Wijfje won the ISU World Junior Speed Skating Championships in Warsaw, Poland after winning the 1500 and 3000 m events. Additionally she won the gold medal at the team pursuit event with Sanneke de Neeling and Esmee Visser.

Wijfje finished third at the ISU World Cup 5000 m event in Heerenveen in December 2016, her first career World Cup medal.

Wijfje pulled off an upset victory by winning the 1500m at the 2020 Dutch Single Distance Championships, winning her first national title. Later that season, together with Ireen Wüst and Antoinette de Jong, she took the team pursuit gold at the European Championships in Heerenveen, and won a silver in the team pursuit at the World Single Distances Championships in Salt Lake City.

Wijfje missed out on qualification for the 2022 Winter Olympics and struggled with a persistent lower leg injury in following seasons.

Following the 2025–26 season, Wijfje announced her retirement at age 30.

== Personal life ==
In 2024, Wijfje married fellow speed skater Marcel Bosker.

== Personal records ==
Personal records
Speed skating
Event	Result	Date	Location	Notes
500 m	38.83	1 February 2020	Olympic Oval, Calgary	
1000 m	1:15.05	28 December 2020	Thialf, Heerenveen	
1500 m	1:51.78	16 February 2020	Utah Olympic Oval, Salt Lake City	
3000 m	4:01.07	13 October 2019	Max Aicher Arena, Inzell	
5000 m	6:58.80	4 November 2018	Heerenveen	
Team pursuit	2:52.65	14 February 2020	Utah Olympic Oval, Salt Lake City	

As of 23 January 2022, Wijfje was placed 15th on the adelskalender with a points total of 158.148.

== Tournament overview ==
Season	Dutch Championships Single Distances	Dutch Championships Allround	World Championships Single Distances	World Championships Juniors	World Cup GWC	European Championships Single Distances	World Championships Allround	Dutch Championships Sprint
2013–14	HEERENVEEN 21st 1000m 11th 1500m 14th 3000m			BJUGN 4th 500m (gold) 1500m (silver) 1000m (silver) 3000m (silver) overall** (silver) 1000m (gold) 1500m (silver) 3000m (gold) team pursuit (with Antoinette de Jong and Jade van der Molen)				
2014–15	HEERENVEEN 12th 1000m 6th 1500m 9th 3000m	HEERENVEEN 7th 500m 9th 3000m 4th 1500m 7th 5000m 7th overall		WARSAW 7th 500m (gold) 1500m 4th 1000m (gold) 3000m (gold) overall** (gold) 1500m (gold) 3000m (bronze) mass start (gold) team pursuit (with Sanneke de Neeling and Esmee Visser)				
2015–16	HEERENVEEN 18th 1000m 7th 1500m 13th 3000m 10th 5000m	HEERENVEEN 8th 500m 6th 3000m (bronze) 1500m 5th 5000m 4th overall						
2016–17	HEERENVEEN 12th 1500m 8th 3000m 12th 5000m (silver) mass start	HEERENVEEN 7th 500m (bronze) 3000m 4th 1500m 7th 5000m 6th overall			8th 1500m 4th 3000m			
2017–18	HEERENVEEN 7th 1500m 7th 3000m 8th 5000m	HEERENVEEN 4th 500m (bronze) 3000m (bronze) 1500m 5th 5000m (bronze) overall			30th 1500m 11th 3000m	KOLOMBA (gold) team pursuit		
2018–19	HEERENVEEN (bronze) 1500m 7th 3000m 7th 5000m 5th mass start	HEERENVEEN (bronze) 500m 4th 3000m (bronze) 1500m 5th 5000m 4th overall	INZELL 6th 1500m 10th mass start		6th 1500m 7th 3000m 8th mass start			
2019–20	HEERENVEEN (gold) 1500m 7th 3000m 6th 5000m 4th mass start	HEERENVEEN (silver) 500m (bronze) 3000m (gold) 1500m (bronze) 5000m (silver) overall	SALT LAKE CITY 11th mass start		4th 1500m 19th 3000/5000m 5th mass start (bronze) team pursuit	HEERENVEEN 4th 1500m (bronze) mass start (gold) team pursuit	HAMAR 6th 500m 4th 3000m 6th 1500m 5th 5000m 5th overall	
2020–21	HEERENVEEN (bronze) 1500m 8th 3000m 6th 5000m	HEERENVEEN 5th 500m (gold) 3000m (bronze) 1500m 4th 5000m (silver) overall	HEERENVEEN 9th 1500m					16th 500m 5th 1000m 17th 500m 5th 1000m 11th overall
2021–22	HEERENVEEN 12th 1500m 5th 3000m 6th 5000m 10th mass start	HEERENVEEN 5th 500m 4th 3000m (bronze) 1500m 4th 5000m (bronze) overall						

** Overall classification determined for allrounders

== World Cup overview ==
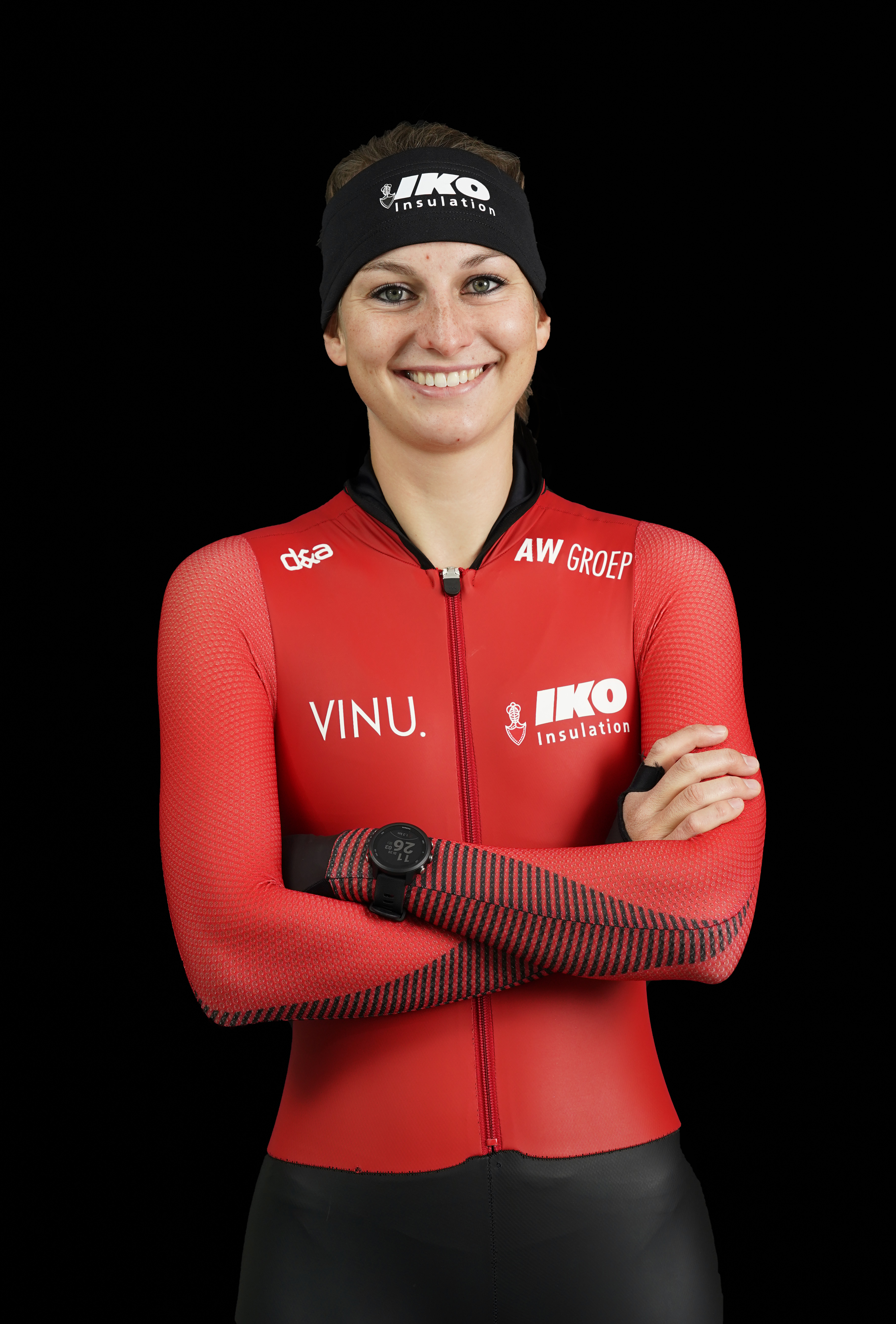

Season	Season	1500 meter				
2016–2017	9th	7th	8th	6th	10th	8th
2017–2018	–	18th	18th	18th	18th	18th
2018–2019	11th	7th	17th	12th	6th	5th
2019–2020	8th	4th	7th	8th	3rd place, bronze medalist(s)	
2020–2021	12th	10th				

Season	Season	3000 meter				
2016–2017	6th	9th	7th	3rd place, bronze medalist(s)	8th	3rd place, bronze medalist(s)
2017–2018	–	–	–	9th	6th	6th
2018–2019	10th	7th	9th	7th	5th	9th
2019–2020	1st(b)	9th	10th	–	–	–
2020–2021	2nd(b)	11th				

Season	Season	Mass start				
2016–2017						
2017–2018						
2018–2019	12th	9th	5th	9th	15th	
2019–2020	3rd place, bronze medalist(s)	8th	6th	10th	–	1st place, gold medalist(s)
2020–2021	–	–	–	5th		

Season	Season	Team pursuit	
2016–2017			
2017–2018			
2018–2019			
2019–2020	2nd place, silver medalist(s)	2nd place, silver medalist(s)	–
2020–2021			

– = Did not participate
* = 5000m
(b) = Division B
DNF = Did not finish
GWC = Grand World Cup
