= 2012 World Single Distance Speed Skating Championships – Women's 1500 metres =

The women's 1500 metres race of the 2012 World Single Distance Speed Skating Championships was held on 23 March at 16:30 local time.

== Results ==
Rank	Pair	Lane	Name	Country	Time	Time behind	Notes
1st place, gold medalist(s)	11	i	Christine Nesbitt	Canada	1:56.07		
2nd place, silver medalist(s)	10	i	Ireen Wüst	Netherlands	1:56.40	+0.33	
3rd place, bronze medalist(s)	6	i	Linda de Vries	Netherlands	1:57.08	+1.01	
4	6	o	Cindy Klassen	Canada	1:57.30	+1.23	
5	9	i	Yekaterina Lobysheva	Russia	1:58.13	+2.06	
6	11	o	Diane Valkenburg	Netherlands	1:58.37	+2.30	
7	10	o	Yekaterina Shikhova	Russia	1:58.48	+2.41	
8	9	o	Yuliya Skokova	Russia	1:58.66	+2.59	
9	7	o	Miho Takagi	Japan	1:58.84	+2.77	
10	4	o	Natalia Czerwonka	Poland	1:58.88	+2.81	
11	8	o	Brittany Schussler	Canada	1:59.62	+3.55	
12	7	i	Hege Bøkko	Norway	1:59.92	+3.85	
13	4	i	Ayaka Kikuchi	Japan	1:59.96	+3.89	
14	5	i	Karolína Erbanová	Czech Republic	2:00.176	+4.10	
15	3	o	Noh Seon-yeong	South Korea	2:00.178	+4.10	
16	8	i	Ida Njåtun	Norway	2:00.34	+4.27	
17	3	i	Jilleanne Rookard	United States	2:00.41	+4.34	
18	2	o	Katarzyna Woźniak	Poland	2:01.74	+5.67	
19	2	i	Lee Ju-Youn	South Korea	2:01.91	+5.84	
20	5	o	Gabriele Hirschbichler	Germany	2:02.13	+6.06	
21	1	i	Luiza Złotkowska	Poland	2:02.17	+6.10	
