= Alie Boorsma =

Dutch speed skater

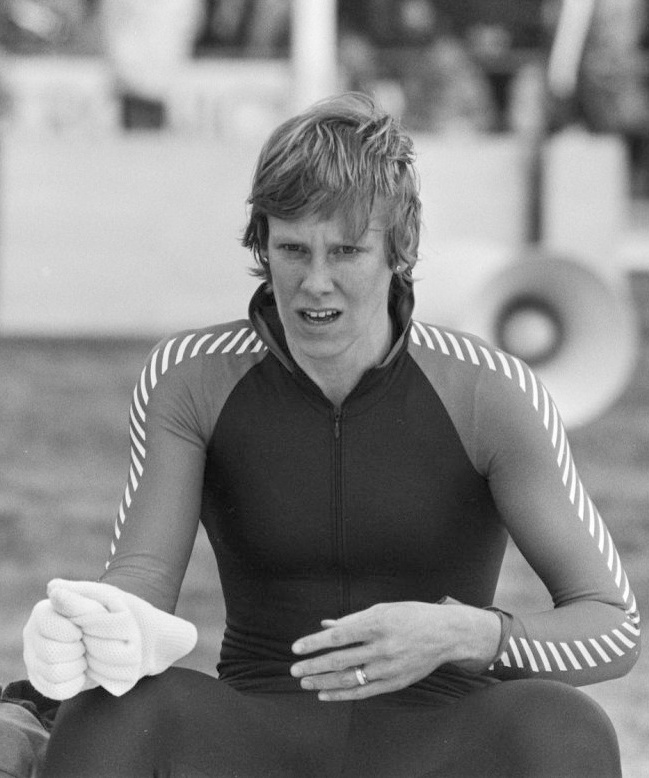
- Alie Boorsma in 1982

Personal information
- Born: 22 July 1959 (age 66) Drachten, the Netherlands
- Height: 1.79 m (5 ft 10 in)
- Weight: 75 kg (165 lb)

Sport
- Sport: Speed skating
Medal record
Dutch Allround Championships
Gold medal – first place	1981 Assen	Allround
Gold medal – first place	1982 Heerenveen	Allround
Dutch Sprint Championships
Gold medal – first place	1983 Utrecht	Sprint

Aaltje Grietje "Alie" Boorsma (born 22 July 1959) is a retired speed skater from the Netherlands who was active between 1979 and 1987. She competed at the 1984 Winter Olympics in the 500 and 1000 m and finished in 33rd and 23rd place, respectively. She won three national titles, allround in 1981 and 1982 and sprint allround in 1983.

Personal bests:

- 500 m – 41.21 (1982)
- 1000 m – 1:24.82 (1982)
- 1500 m – 2:10.55 (1982)
- 3000 m – 4:38.50 (1981)
- 5000 m – 8:12.19 (1985)
