= Trijnie Rep =

Dutch speed skater

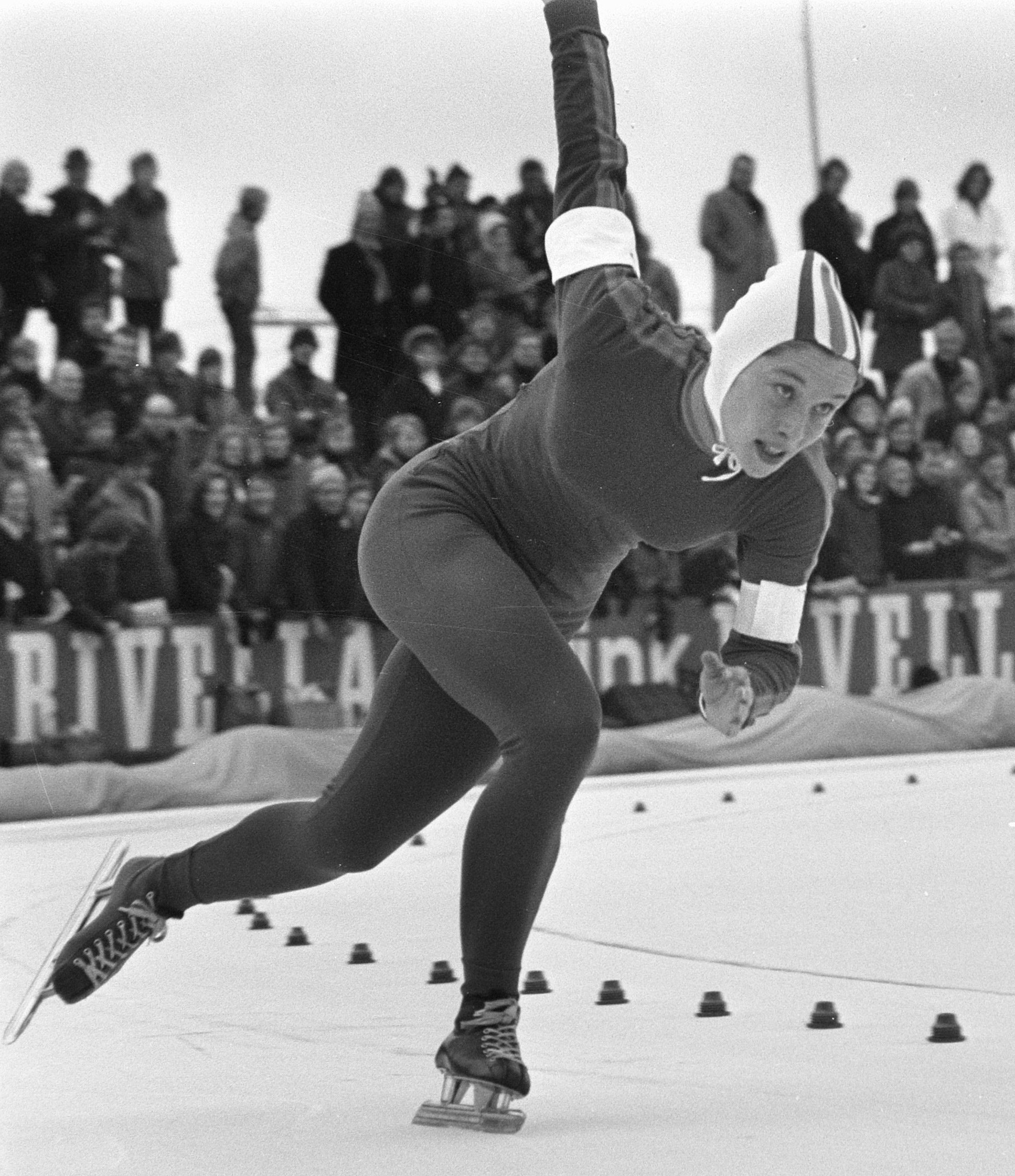
- Trijnie Rep in 1972

Personal information
- Born: 4 December 1950 (age 75) Oostzaan, the Netherlands
- Height: 162 cm (5 ft 4 in)
- Weight: 57 kg (126 lb)

Sport
- Sport: Speed skating
Medal record
Representing the Netherlands
European Championships
Silver medal – second place	1973 Brandbu	Allround
World Championships
Bronze medal – third place	1973 Strömsund	Allround

Trijntje "Trijnie" Rep (later Roozendaal; born 4 December 1950) is a Dutch former speed skater from who competed for the Netherlands at the 1972 Winter Olympics in the 500 and 1000 m and finished in 20th and 24th place, respectively. The following year she won a silver medal at the European and a bronze medal at the world allround championships.

Personal bests:

- 500 m – 44.3 (1971)
- 1000 m – 1:30.5 (1971)
- 1500 m – 2:19.50 (1972)
- 3000 m – 4:54.27 (1972)

After retiring from skating Rep competed in triathlon, in particular in the 2008 Ironman World Championship. She also ran the slaughterhouse Rep en Rozendaal in Barneveld, but went bankrupt in 2006 due to the impact of avian influenza.
