= Willy de Beer =

Dutch Speed skater

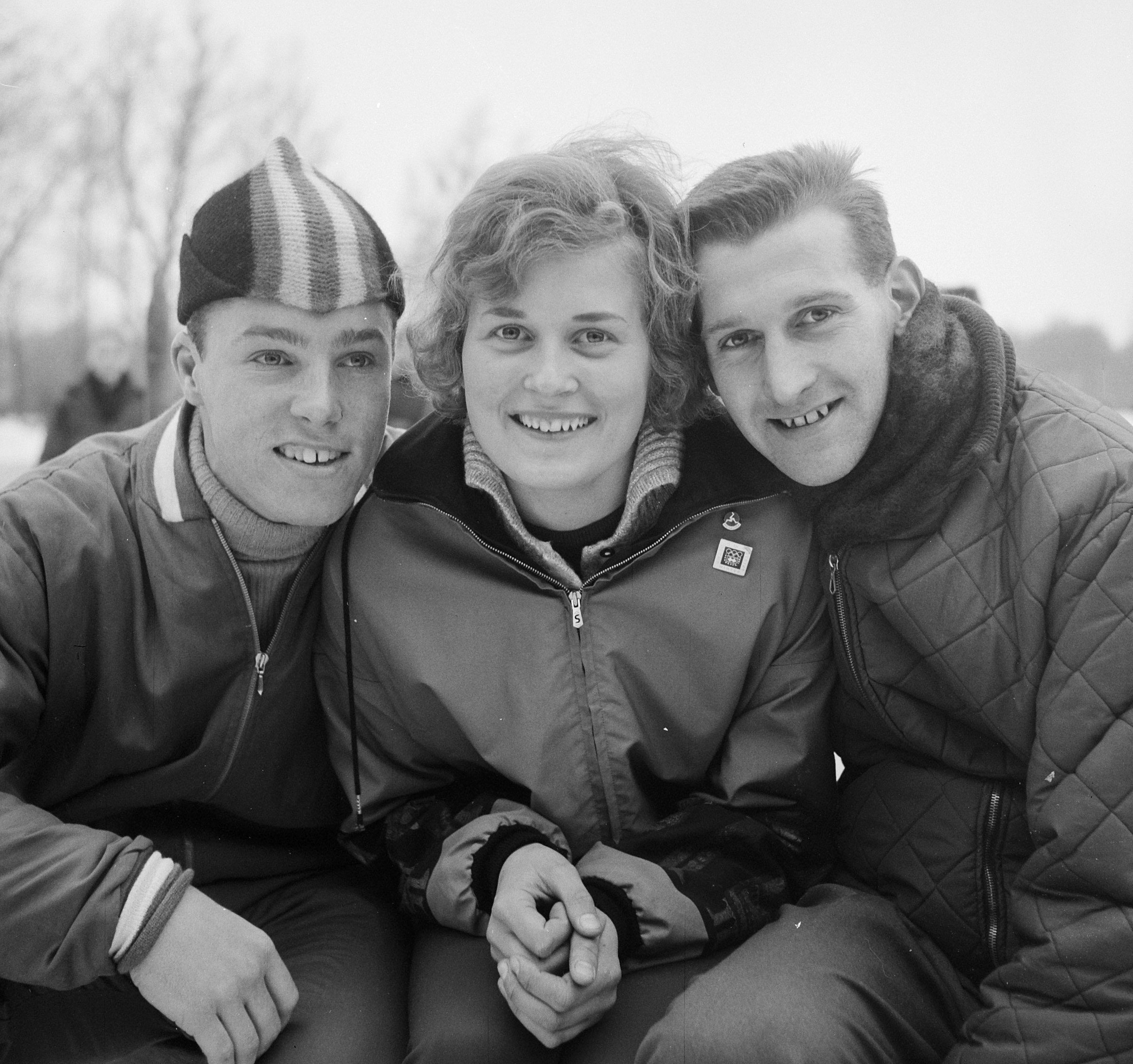
- Willy de Beer (center) in 1963

Personal information
- Born: 5 September 1942 (age 83) Medemblik, the Netherlands

Sport
- Sport: Speed skating
- Event: 500–10000 m

Achievements and titles
- Personal best(s): 500 m – 48.4 (1966); 1000 m – 1:38.1 (1963); 1500 m – 2:29.5 (1963); 3000 m – 5:18.9 (1966)
Medal record
Dutch Allround championships
Gold medal – first place	1962 Amsterdam	Allround
Gold medal – first place	1963 Groningen	Allround

Wilhelmina "Willy" de Beer (later Vel, born 5 September 1942) is a retired Dutch speed skater. She competed in the 1000, 1500 and 3000 m events at the 1964 Winter Olympics with the best result of 16th place in the 1500 m.
