= Egbert van 't Oever =

Dutch speed skater

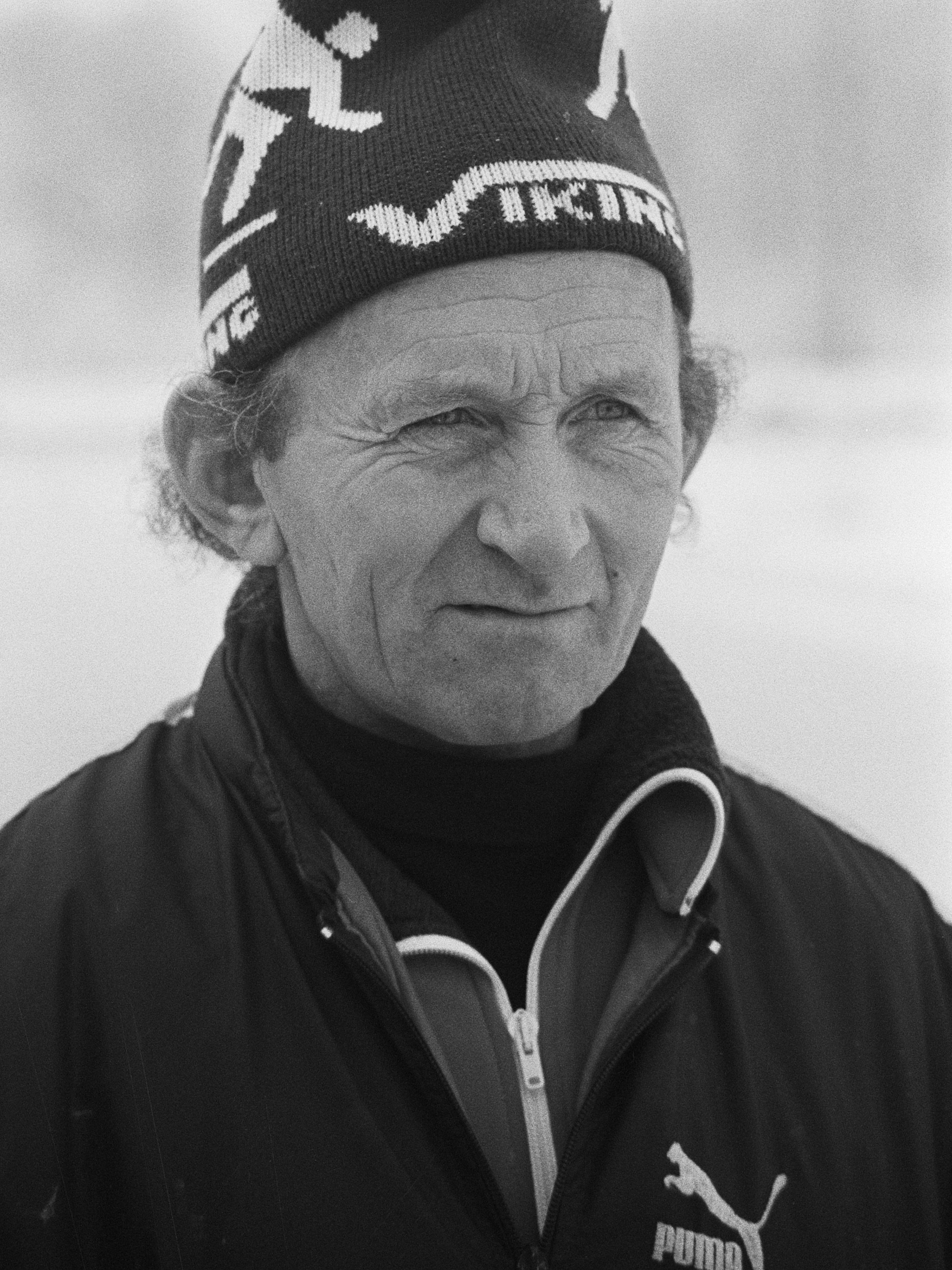
- Egbert van 't Oever in 1981

Personal information
- Nationality: Dutch
- Born: 15 July 1927; Lisse, Netherlands
- Died: 5 October 2001 (aged 74); Lisse, Netherlands

Sport
- Sport: Speed skating

Egbert van 't Oever (15 July 1927 – 5 October 2001) was a Dutch speed skater. He competed at the 1952 Winter Olympics and the 1956 Winter Olympics.

== Biography ==
Van 't Oever coached Yvonne van Gennip at the 1988 Olympic Games in Calgary where she won three gold medals. He was later coach of Marianne Timmer. Until his death, he remained active in skating as a coach.

At the end of the speed skating season, the Egbert van 't Oever Encouragement Prize is awarded to the most promising Dutch junior speed skater.

Egbert van 't Oever died at the age of 74 from the consequences of colon cancer.

== Personal records ==
Personal records
Men's Speed skating
Event	Result	Date	Location	Notes
500 meter	45.00	22 January 1956	Misurina	
1000 meter	1:31.70	22 January 1956	Misurina	
1500 meter	2:22.70	15 January 1955	Oslo	
3000 meter	4:56.60	22 January 1956	Misurina	
5000 meter	8:39.10	15 January 1955	Oslo	
10000 meter	17:37.70	26 January 1956	Misurina	
Big combination	198.807	15–16 January 1955	Oslo	
Small combination	199.979	12–13 February 1955	Turku	

Van 't Oever has a score of 197.362 points in the Adelskalendern
