= Jaap Havekotte =

Dutch speed skater (1912–2014)

Personal information
- Born: 16 March 1912 Diemen, Netherlands
- Died: 23 April 2014 (aged 102) Hilversum, Netherlands

Sport
- Country: Netherlands
- Sport: Speed skating

Jaap Havekotte and “his” Viking skates (Polygoon Film 1973)

Jaap Havekotte (16 March 1912 – 23 April 2014) was a Dutch speed skater. He skated in several Dutch championships during the 1940s, but is best known as the founder of Viking Schaatsenfabriek, a Dutch producer of ice skates. The Viking ice skate proved to be very popular, and by 1972 every speed skating world record was skated on Viking ice skates. Viking was the first company to produce the clap skate on a large scale. Due to his significant influence on speed skating in the Netherlands, speed skaters from later generations spoke fondly of Havekotte and used to call him 'Oom Jaap' ('Uncle Jaap'). Havekotte died on 23 April 2014 at the age of 102.
