= Thea Limbach =

Dutch speed skater

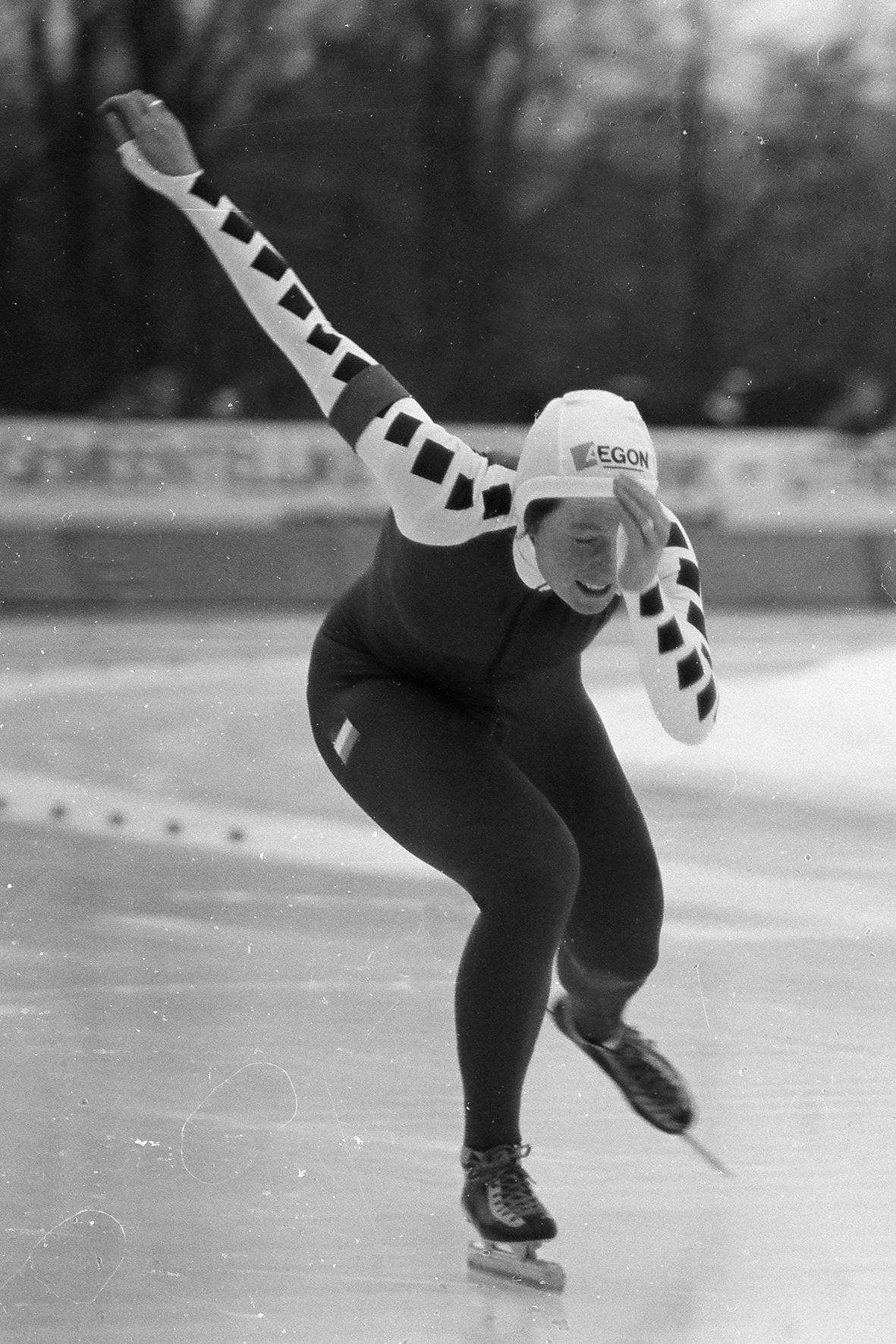
- Thea Limbach in 1983

Personal information
- Born: 27 February 1959 (age 67) Harderwijk, the Netherlands
- Height: 1.72 m (5 ft 8 in)
- Weight: 67 kg (148 lb)

Sport
- Sport: Speed skating

Thecla Maria Catharina "Thea" Limbach (born 27 February 1959) is a retired speed skater from the Netherlands. She competed at the 1984 Winter Olympics in the 500, 1000, 1500 and 3000 m and finished in 27th, 21st, 9th and 13th place, respectively. She finished third in the KNSB Dutch Allround Championships in 1982, 1984 and 1985; in 1983 she was third in the KNSB Dutch Sprint Championships.

Personal bests:

- 500 m – 42.6 (1983)
- 1000 m – 1:24.12 (1985)
- 1500 m – 2:09.59 (1986)
- 3000 m – 4:33.96 (1985)
- 5000 m – 7:59.68 (1985)

In the 2000s she became Chef de Mission of the Dutch teams at the European Youth Olympic Festival and Paralympic Games (2004 and 2008). She works at the Zuyderzee Lyceum in Emmeloord.
