= Sippie Tigchelaar =

Dutch speed skater

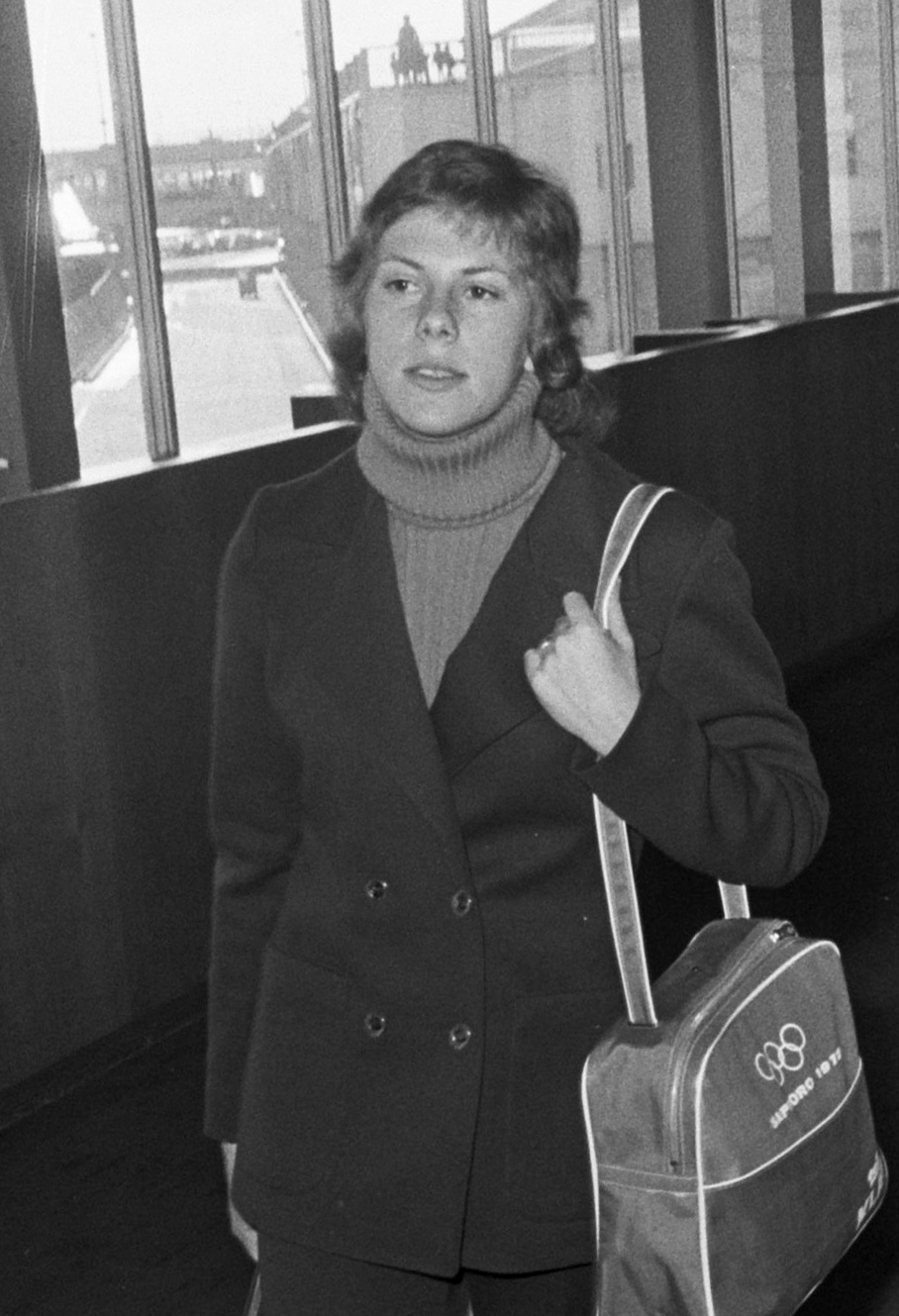
- Sippie Tigchelaar in 1972

Personal information
- Born: 11 July 1952 (age 73) Franeker, the Netherlands
- Height: 1.71 m (5 ft 7 in)
- Weight: 68 kg (150 lb)

Sport
- Sport: Speed skating

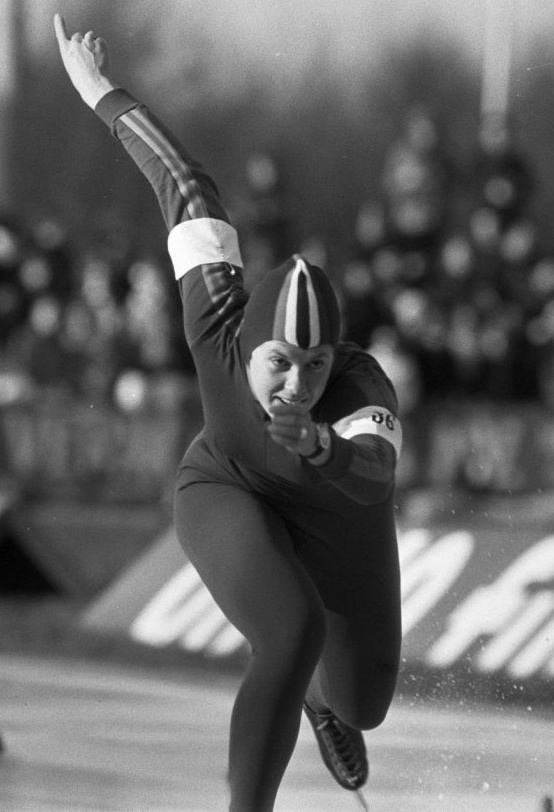
Sippie Tigchelaar in 1974

Sippie Tigchelaar (born 11 July 1952) is a retired speed skater from the Netherlands who was active between 1969 and 1975. She competed at the 1972 Winter Olympics in the 3000 m and finished in fourth place. She had gradually improved her position in the national all-round championships from eighth place in 1972 to third in 1973, second in 1974, and first in 1975.

Personal bests:

- 500 m – 45.91 (1975)
- 1000 m – 1:31.44 (1975)
- 1500 m – 2:19.5 (1975)
- 3000 m – 4:41.01 (1975)

Since 2007 she is a member of the national skating federation (KNSB); in 2010 she was re-elected for another three years. In 2012, she became a member of the Order of Orange-Nassau. She lives in Wolvega.
