= Frits Schalij =

Dutch speed skater

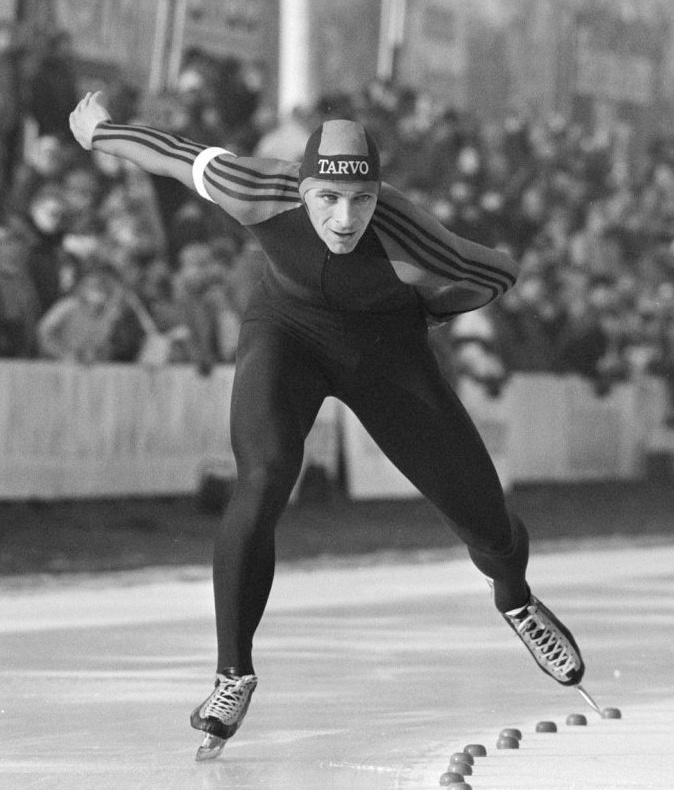
- Frits Schalij in 1983

Personal information
- Born: 14 August 1957 (age 68) Weesp, the Netherlands
- Height: 1.85 m (6 ft 1 in)
- Weight: 85 kg (187 lb)

Sport
- Sport: Speed skating
Medal record
Representing the Netherlands
European Championships
Bronze medal – third place	1984 Larvik	Allround
Silver medal – second place	1985 Eskilstuna	Allround

Frits Schalij (born 14 August 1957) is a retired speed skater from the Netherlands who was active between 1978 and 1987. He competed at the 1984 Winter Olympics in the 1500 m and 5000 m and finished in 10th and 17th place, respectively. He won a bronze and a silver medal at the European allround championships in 1984 and 1985, respectively. Nationally, he finished second allround in 1982 and 1984 and third in 1981, 1983, 1985 and 1986.

== Personal records ==
Personal records
Men's speed skating
Event	Result	Date	Location	Notes
500 meter	38.83	14 January 1984	Davos, Switzerland	Venue at the time named Eisstadion Davos
1000 meter	1:16.69	9 February 1985	Inzell, Germany	Venue at the time named Ludwich Schwabl Stadion
1500 meter	1:56.42	2 January 1982	Inzell, Germany	
3000 meter	4:08.33	26 February 1981	Inzell, Germany	
5000 meter	7:04.73	15 February 1986	Inzell, Germany	
10000 meter	14:36.23	16 February 1986	Inzell, Germany	

== Tournament overview ==
Season	Dutch Championships Allround	European Championships Allround	World Championships Allround	Olympic Games	World Championships Junior Allround
1976–77					INZELL 11th 500m 5th 3000m 4th 1500m 9th 5000m 6th overall
1977–78	EINDHOVEN 6th 500m 13th 5000m 8th 1500m DNQ 10000m 13th overall				
1978–79	HEERENVEEN (bronze) 500m 10th 5000m (bronze) 1500m 12th 10000m 6th overall				
1979–80	THE HAGUE 4th 500m 6th 5000m (bronze) 1500m 9th 10000m 7th overall		HEERENVEEN 9th 500m 20th 5000m 16th 1500m DNQ 10000m NC overall(17th)		
1980–81	ASSEN (silver) 500m (bronze) 5000m (gold) 1500m 7th 10000m (bronze) overall	DEVENTER 6th 500m 9th 5000m 4th 1500m 6th 10000m 5th overall	OSLO 8th 500m 13th 5000m 6th 1500m 10th 10000m 8th overall		
1981–82	HEERENVEEN (gold) 500m (silver) 5000m (gold) 1500m (silver) 10000m (silver) overall	OSLO 4th 500m 4th 5000m (gold) 1500m 12th 10000m 5th overall	ASSEN (bronze) 500m 8th 5000m (silver) 1500m 8th 10000m 4th overall		
1982–83	DEVENTER (silver) 500m 6th 5000m (gold) 1500m (bronze) 10000m (bronze) overall	THE HAGUE (gold) 500m 9th 5000m 6th 1500m 8th 10000m 5th overall	OSLO 17th 500m 11th 5000m 9th 1500m 12th 10000m 11th overall		
1983–84	GRONINGEN (bronze) 500m 4th 5000m (silver) 1500m (bronze) 10000m (silver) overall	LARVIK 7th 500m 5th 5000m (silver) 1500m 13th 10000m (bronze) overall	GOTHENBURG 15th 500m 15th 5000m (silver) 1500m 10th 10000m 7th overall	SARAJEVO 17th 5000m 10th 1500m	
1984–85	ALKMAAR (bronze) 500m (bronze) 5000m (bronze) 1500m (bronze) 10000m (bronze) overall	ESKILSTUNA 6th 500m (bronze) 5000m (silver) 1500m 4th 10000m (silver) overall	HAMAR 11th 500m 6th 5000m 10th 1500m 4th 10000m 4th overall		
1985–86	ASSEN (bronze) 500m 7th 5000m (silver) 1500m (bronze) 10000m (bronze) overall	OSLO 10th 500m 18th 5000m 9th 1500m 12th 10000m 11th overall	INZELL 18th 500m 16th 5000m 7th 1500m 8th 10000m 11th overall		

- NC = No classification
- DNQ = Did not qualify for the final event
