= Rudie Liebrechts =

Dutch speed skater and cyclist

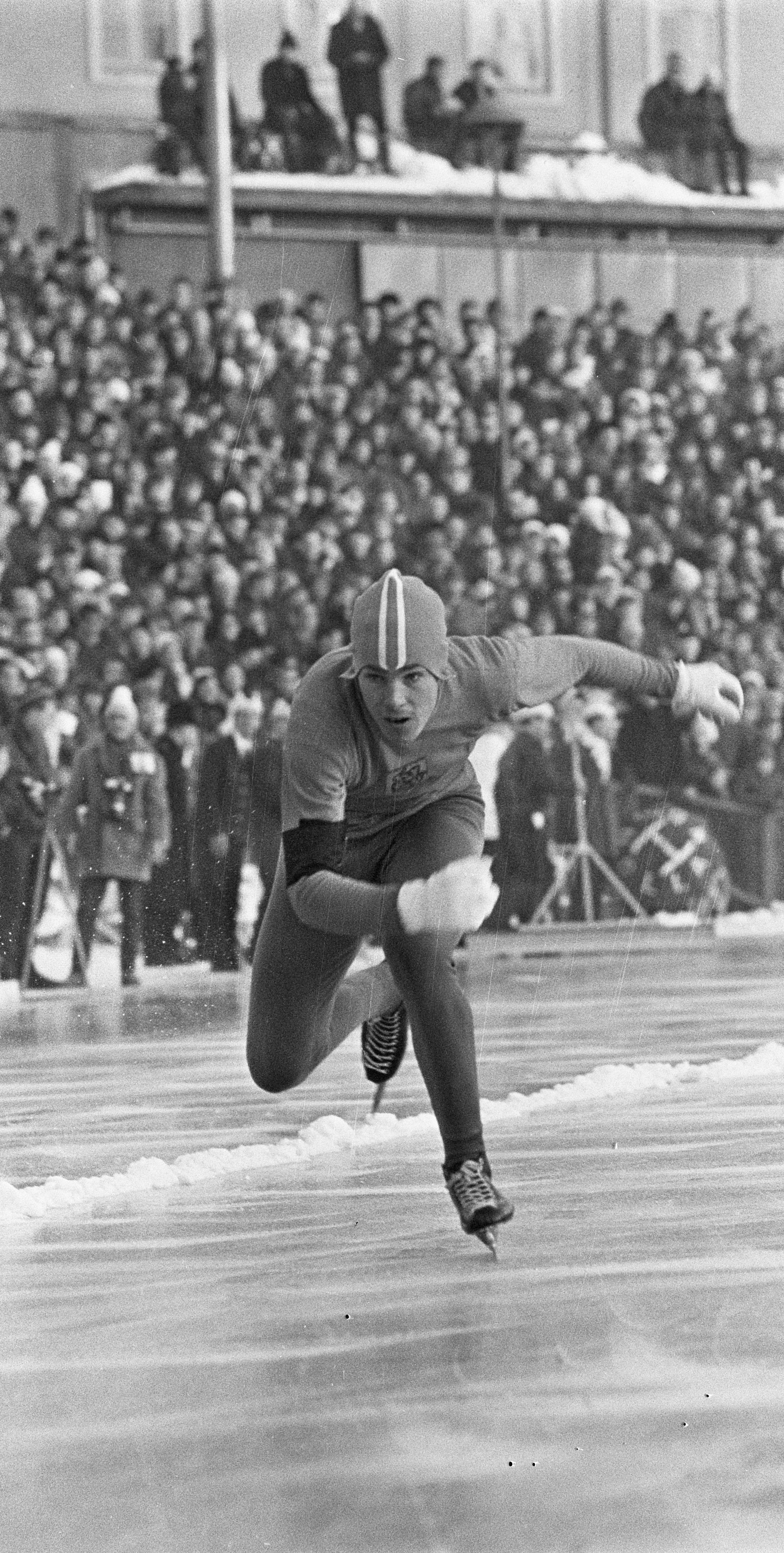
- Rudie Liebrechts

Personal information
- Born: 6 September 1941 (age 84) Vlaardingen, Netherlands

Sport
- Country: Netherlands
- Sport: Speed skating

Achievements and titles
- Personal best: 1964 Winter Olympics
Medal record
Men's speed skating
Representing the Netherlands
World Championships
Bronze medal – third place	1961 Gothenburg	Allround
Bronze medal – third place	1964 Helsinki	Allround

Rutgerus (Rudie) Liebrechts (born 6 September 1941) is a former Dutch speed skater and racing cyclist.

Liebrechts was born in Vlaardingen and was among the best Dutch speed skaters from 1961 to 1967. He twice became Dutch Allround champion, in 1963 and 1964, while he finished second in 1965 (behind Ard Schenk), and third in 1966 (behind Kees Verkerk and Ard Schenk).

He had his biggest international successes at the World Allround Speed Skating Championships, where he twice won a bronze medal overall. In 1961 in Gothenburg he finished behind his compatriot Henk van der Grift and the Russian Viktor Kosichkin, while in 1964 in Helsinki he followed the Norwegian Knut Johannesen and Viktor Kosichkin, again. At the 1964 Winter Olympics in Innsbruck he missed out on medals, finishing 10th in the 1500m, 8th in the 5000m, and a close 4th on the 10,000m.

In 1965 at the Bislett stadion in Oslo he broke the world record on the 3000m.

Rudie Liebrechts also was a reasonably successful cyclist at the national level; in 1965 he won the tour of Gouda.

== World records ==
Discipline	Time	Date	Location
3000 m	4:26.8	25 February 1965	Oslo

Source: SpeedSkatingStats.com
