= Yvonne Nauta =

Dutch female speed skater (born 1991)

Personal information
- Born: 21 February 1991 (age 35) Uitwellingerga, Netherlands

Sport
- Country: Netherlands
- Sport: Speed skating
- Turned pro: 2008
- Retired: 2019
Medal record
Women's speed skating
Representing the Netherlands
European Championships
Silver medal – second place	2014 Hamar	Allround
World Allround Championships
Bronze medal – third place	2014 Heerenveen	Allround
Dutch Allround championships
Gold medal – first place	2014 Amsterdam	Allround

Yvonne Nauta (born 21 February 1991) is a former Dutch female speed skater who is specialised in long distances and was born in Uitwellingerga.

Nauta won three titles at the Junior World Championships (2 x team pursuit and 3000 meter). On 27 October 2013, she won the 5000 m title at the Dutch Distances Championships. Nauta participated in the 2014 European Championships and finished second behind compatriot Ireen Wüst. At the 2014 World Allround Speed Skating Championships in Heerenveen, she won the 5000 m and finished third in the final ranking.

== Personal bests ==
Personal records
Speed skating
Event	Result	Date	Location	Notes
500 m	40.58	27 December 2014	Thialf, Heerenveen	
1000 m	1:18.96	25 October 2014	Thialf, Heerenveen	
1500 m	1:57.23	29 December 2013	Thialf, Heerenveen	
3000 m	4:02.56	9 February 2017	Gangneung	
5000 m	6:57.59	23 March 2014	Thialf, Heerenveen	
