= Annouk van der Weijden =

Dutch speed skater

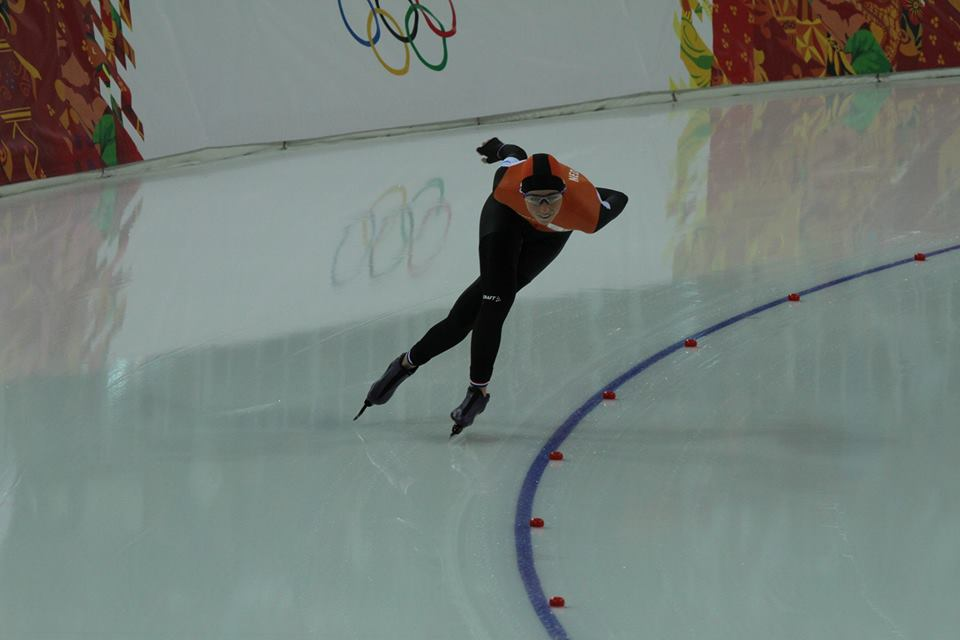

Personal information
- Born: 27 June 1986 (age 39) Leiderdorp, Netherlands

Sport
- Country: Netherlands
- Sport: Speed skating
Medal record
World Allround Championships
Bronze medal – third place	2018 Amsterdam	Allround

Annouk van der Weijden (born 27 June 1986) is a former Dutch speed skater. Born in Leiderdorp, she competed at the 2014 Winter Olympics in Sochi, where she placed fifth in 3000 metres. She competed again at the 2018 Winter Olympics and finished fourth in 5000 metres.

== Personal records ==
Personal records
Speed skating
Event	Result	Date	Location	Notes
500 m	39.33	18 November 2015	Utah Olympic Oval, Salt Lake City	
1000 m	1:17.18	16 January 2016	Thiaf, Heerenveen	
1500 m	1:55.81	16 November 2013	Utah Olympic Oval, Salt Lake City	
3000 m	4:00.45	3 November 2015	Olympic Oval, Calgary	
3000 m	6:54.17	16 February 2018	Gangneung Oval, Gangneung	
