= Linda de Vries =

Dutch speed skater

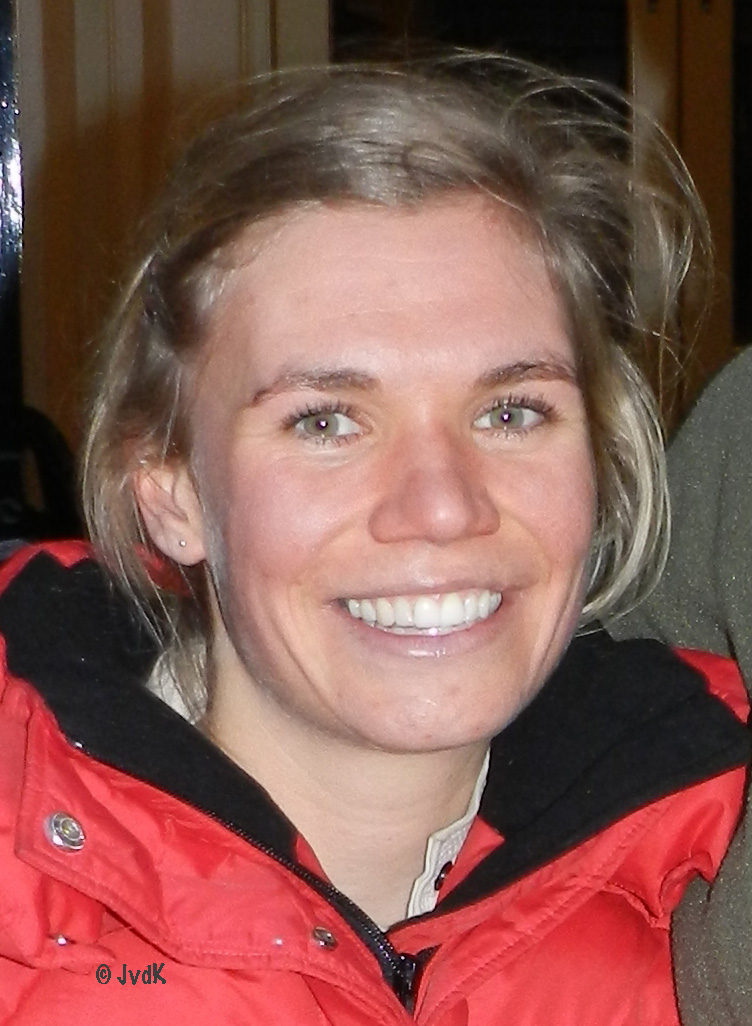

Personal information
- Born: 4 February 1988 (age 38) Assen, Netherlands

Sport
- Country: Netherlands
- Sport: speed skating
- Turned pro: 2008
- Retired: 2018
Medal record
Women's speed skating
Representing the Netherlands
World Single Distance Championships
Gold medal – first place	2012 Heerenveen	Team pursuit
Bronze medal – third place	2012 Heerenveen	1500 m
European Championships
Silver medal – second place	2013 Heerenveen	Allround
Bronze medal – third place	2015 Chelyabinsk	Allround

Linda de Vries (born 4 February 1988) is a Dutch former speed skater. She finished third in the Women's 1500 metres event at the 2012 World Single Distance Speed Skating Championships and twice (in 2012 and 2013) fourth at the World All-Round Speed Skating Championships.

Her parents, Margriet Pomper and Jan de Vries, were also speed skaters.

== Records ==
Personal records
500 m	39.26	7 March 2015	Olympic Oval, Calgary
1000 m	1:17.60	2 November 2013	Olympic Oval, Calgary
1500 m	1:56.48	19 February 2011	Utah Olympic Oval, Salt Lake City
3000 m	4:01.00	15 November 2013	Utah Olympic Oval, Salt Lake City
5000 m	7:02.77	13 January 2013	Thialf, Heerenveen

She is currently in 26th position in the adelskalender.
