= 2023–24 ISU Speed Skating World Cup – World Cup 2 =

Ice skating competition in Beijing, China

2023–24 ISU Speed Skating World Cup 2
- Venue: National Speed Skating Oval; Beijing; China
- Dates: 17 — 19 November 2023

The second competition weekend of the 2023–24 ISU Speed Skating World Cup is being held at the National Speed Skating Oval in Beijing, China, from Friday, 17 November, until Sunday, 19 November 2023.

== Medal summary ==
=== Men's events ===
Event	Gold	Time	Silver	Time	Bronze	Time	Report
500 m (1)	Wataru Morishige; Japan	34.72	Yuma Murakami; Japan	34.82	Kim Jun-ho; South Korea	35.00	
500 m (2)	Wataru Morishige; Japan	34.69	Laurent Dubreuil; Canada	34.81	Yuma Murakami; Japan	34.82	
1000 m	Kjeld Nuis; Netherlands	1:08.11	Håvard Holmefjord Lorentzen; Norway	1:08.99	Ning Zhongyan; China	1:09.03	
1500 m	Kjeld Nuis; Netherlands	1:44.80	Patrick Roest; Netherlands	1:45.36	Ning Zhongyan; China	1:45.51	
5000 m	Patrick Roest; Netherlands	6:11.40	Davide Ghiotto; Italy	6:14.25	Sander Eitrem; Norway	6:15.42	
Mass start^{A}	Andrea Giovannini; Italy	61	Daniele Di Stefano; Italy	40	Bart Swings; Belgium	22	
Team sprint	United States; Conor McDermott-Mostowy; Cooper McLeod; Zach Stoppelmoor	1:20.27	China; Ning Zhongyan; Du Haonan; Liu Bin	1:20.72	Netherlands; Janno Botman; Louis Hollaar; Wesly Dijs	1:20.73	

^{A} In mass start, race points are accumulated during the race based on results of the intermediate sprints and the final sprint. The skater with most race points is the winner.

=== Women's events ===
Event	Gold	Time	Silver	Time	Bronze	Time	Report
500 m (1)	Erin Jackson; United States	37.91	Kimi Goetz; United States	37.92	Kim Min-sun; South Korea	38.00	
500 m (2)	Erin Jackson; United States	37.54	Kim Min-sun; South Korea	37.85	Jutta Leerdam; Netherlands	37.88	
1000 m	Miho Takagi; Japan	1:14.44	Kimi Goetz; United States	1:14.45	Jutta Leerdam; Netherlands	1:14.88	
1500 m	Miho Takagi; Japan	1:55.52	Han Mei; China	1:55.92	Li Qishi; China	1:57.01	
3000 m	Ragne Wiklund; Norway	4:03.41	Martina Sábliková; Czech Republic	4:04.86	Han Mei; China	4:05.45	
Mass start^{A}	Marijke Groenewoud; Netherlands	63	Ivanie Blondin; Canada	40	Valérie Maltais; Canada	20	
Team sprint	Netherlands; Naomi Verkerk; Helga Drost; Antoinette Rijpma-de Jong	1:27.74	Canada; Ivanie Blondin; Brooklyn McDougall; Maddison Pearman	1:28.76	Poland; Iga Wojtasik; Karolina Bosiek; Andżelika Wójcik	1:29.09	

^{A} In mass start, race points are accumulated during the race based on results of the intermediate sprints and the final sprint. The skater with most race points is the winner.

== Results ==
=== Men's events ===
==== 1st 500 m ====
The race started on 17 November 2023 at 17:42.

Rank	Pair	Lane	Name	Country	Time	Diff
1st place, gold medalist(s)	8	o	Wataru Morishige	Japan	34.72	
2nd place, silver medalist(s)	10	i	Yuma Murakami	Japan	34.82	+0.10
3rd place, bronze medalist(s)	7	o	Kim Jun-ho	South Korea	35.00	+0.28
4	5	o	Merijn Scheperkamp	Netherlands	35.00	+0.28
5	1	i	Damian Żurek	Poland	35.03	+0.31
6	10	o	Laurent Dubreuil	Canada	35.06	+0.34
7	5	i	David Bosa	Italy	35.07	+0.35
8	9	o	Tatsuya Shinhama	Japan	35.20	+0.48
9	4	o	Marek Kania	Poland	35.20	+0.48
10	8	i	Yudai Yamamoto	Japan	35.22	+0.50
11	2	i	Håvard Holmefjord Lorentzen	Norway	35.23	+0.51
12	6	i	Janno Botman	Netherlands	35.24	+0.52
13	1	o	Zach Stoppelmoor	United States	35.32	+0.60
14	3	o	Cooper McLeod	United States	35.36	+0.64
15	7	i	Nil Llop	Spain	35.39	+0.67
16	9	i	Takuya Morimoto	Japan	35.43	+0.71
17	6	o	Bjørn Magnussen	Norway	35.47	+0.75
18	3	i	Piotr Michalski	Poland	35.49	+0.77
19	2	o	Du Haonan	China	35.76	+1.04
20	4	i	Cha Min-kyu	South Korea	35.83	+1.11

==== 2nd 500 m ====
The race started on 18 November 2023 at 17:35.

Rank	Pair	Lane	Name	Country	Time	Diff
1st place, gold medalist(s)	9	i	Wataru Morishige	Japan	34.69	
2nd place, silver medalist(s)	9	o	Laurent Dubreuil	Canada	34.81	+0.12
3rd place, bronze medalist(s)	10	o	Yuma Murakami	Japan	34.82	+0.13
4	2	o	Gao Tingyu	China	34.94	+0.25
5	8	i	Kim Jun-ho	South Korea	35.08	+0.39
6	10	i	Yudai Yamamoto	Japan	35.09	+0.40
7	3	o	Kai Verbij	Netherlands	35.09	+0.40
8	4	i	Janno Botman	Netherlands	35.13	+0.44
9	1	o	Piotr Michalski	Poland	35.16	+0.47
10	6	i	David Bosa	Italy	35.18	+0.49
11	1	i	Li Tianlong	China	35.25	+0.56
12	7	i	Merijn Scheperkamp	Netherlands	35.25	+0.56
13	8	o	Tatsuya Shinhama	Japan	35.29	+0.60
14	5	i	Nil Llop	Spain	35.30	+0.61
15	6	o	Marek Kania	Poland	35.33	+0.64
16	7	o	Damian Żurek	Poland	35.39	+0.70
17	4	o	Hein Otterspeer	Netherlands	35.44	+0.75
18	5	o	Bjørn Magnussen	Norway	35.46	+0.77
19	3	i	Cooper McLeod	United States	35.57	+0.88
20	2	i	Cha Min-kyu	South Korea	35.87	+1.18

==== 1000 m ====
The race started on 19 November 2023 at 17:30.

Rank	Pair	Lane	Name	Country	Time	Diff
1st place, gold medalist(s)	10	o	Kjeld Nuis	Netherlands	1:08.11	
2nd place, silver medalist(s)	4	i	Håvard Holmefjord Lorentzen	Norway	1:08.99	+0.88
3rd place, bronze medalist(s)	8	i	Ning Zhongyan	China	1:09.03	+0.92
4	5	i	Tatsuya Shinhama	Japan	1:09.18	+1.07
5	10	i	Taiyo Nonomura	Japan	1:09.29	+1.18
6	7	o	Jenning de Boo	Netherlands	1:09.32	+1.21
7	2	i	Marten Liiv	Estonia	1:09.37	+1.26
8	6	o	Tim Prins	Netherlands	1:09.53	+1.42
9	8	o	Moritz Klein	Germany	1:09.59	+1.48
10	3	i	Connor Howe	Canada	1:09.68	+1.57
11	9	o	David Bosa	Italy	1:09.89	+1.78
12	4	o	Damian Żurek	Poland	1:09.91	+1.80
13	7	i	Kazuya Yamada	Japan	1:10.05	+1.94
14	6	i	Vincent De Haître	Canada	1:10.10	+1.99
15	3	o	Zach Stoppelmoor	United States	1:10.21	+2.10
16	1	o	Cornelius Kersten	United Kingdom	1:10.36	+2.25
17	9	i	Masaya Yamada	Japan	1:10.36	+2.25
18	2	o	Conor McDermott-Mostowy	United States	1:10.78	+2.67
19	5	o	Cooper McLeod	United States	1:10.97	+2.86
20	1	i	Antoine Gélinas-Beaulieu	Canada	1:12.54	+4.43

==== 1500 m ====
The race started on 17 November 2023 at 18:51.

Rank	Pair	Lane	Name	Country	Time	Diff
1st place, gold medalist(s)	8	i	Kjeld Nuis	Netherlands	1:44.80	
2nd place, silver medalist(s)	5	i	Patrick Roest	Netherlands	1:45.36	+0.56
3rd place, bronze medalist(s)	8	o	Ning Zhongyan	China	1:45.51	+0.71
4	7	o	Sander Eitrem	Norway	1:45.73	+0.93
5	4	i	Hendrik Dombek	Germany	1:45.91	+1.11
6	5	o	Hallgeir Engebråten	Norway	1:46.12	+1.32
7	7	i	Wesly Dijs	Netherlands	1:46.13	+1.33
8	4	o	David La Rue	Canada	1:46.29	+1.49
9	6	o	Thomas Krol	Netherlands	1:46.35	+1.55
10	6	i	Kazuya Yamada	Japan	1:46.69	+1.89
11	3	i	Bart Swings	Belgium	1:46.87	+2.07
12	2	o	Allan Dahl Johansson	Norway	1:46.89	+2.09
13	2	i	Riku Tsuchiya	Japan	1:47.23	+2.43
14	1	i	Antoine Gélinas-Beaulieu	Canada	1:47.27	+2.47
15	9	o	Taiyo Nonomura	Japan	1:47.38	+2.58
16	10	o	Peder Kongshaug	Norway	1:47.46	+2.66
17	3	o	Alessio Trentini	Italy	1:47.62	+2.82
18	1	o	Daniele Di Stefano	Italy	1:47.74	+2.94
19	9	i	Masaya Yamada	Japan	1:47.87	+3.07
	10	i	Seitaro Ichinohe	Japan	Disqualified	

==== 5000 m ====
The race started on 18 November 2023 at 18:14.

Rank	Pair	Lane	Name	Country	Time	Diff
1st place, gold medalist(s)	6	o	Patrick Roest	Netherlands	6:11.40	
2nd place, silver medalist(s)	8	i	Davide Ghiotto	Italy	6:14.25	+2.85
3rd place, bronze medalist(s)	8	o	Sander Eitrem	Norway	6:15.42	+4.02
4	7	i	Ted-Jan Bloemen	Canada	6:16.89	+5.49
5	6	i	Sverre Lunde Pedersen	Norway	6:18.58	+7.18
6	4	i	Hallgeir Engebråten	Norway	6:18.94	+7.54
7	7	o	Michele Malfatti	Italy	6:20.72	+9.32
8	5	i	Bart Swings	Belgium	6:21.22	+9.82
9	2	i	Chris Huizinga	Netherlands	6:22.02	+10.62
10	3	i	Casey Dawson	United States	6:22.29	+10.89
11	1	o	Wu Yu	China	6:23.90	+12.50
12	3	o	Jesse Speijers	Netherlands	6:24.80	+13.40
13	4	o	Sigurd Henriksen	Norway	6:26.01	+14.61
14	5	o	Seitaro Ichinohe	Japan	6:26.12	+14.72
15	1	i	Riku Tsuchiya	Japan	6:26.17	+14.77
16	2	o	Kristian Gamme Ulekleiv	Norway	6:32.63	+21.23

==== Mass start ====
The race started on 19 November 2023 at 19:42.

Rank	Name	Country	Points	Time
1st place, gold medalist(s)	Andrea Giovannini	Italy	61	7:39.52
2nd place, silver medalist(s)	Daniele Di Stefano	Italy	40	7:39.91
3rd place, bronze medalist(s)	Bart Swings	Belgium	22	7:39.97
4	Bart Hoolwerf	Netherlands	10	7:40.12
5	Kota Kikuchi	Japan	6	7:40.18
6	Timothy Loubineaud	France	6	7:55.81
7	Chung Jae-won	South Korea	3	7:40.21
8	Kristian Gamme Ulekleiv	Norway	3	7:41.90
9	Shomu Sasaki	Japan	2	7:54.20
10	Felix Rhijnen	Germany	2	8:06.17
11	Marcel Bosker	Netherlands	1	7:44.76
12	Felix Maly	Germany	1	7:49.94
13	Gabriel Odor	Austria		7:40.40
14	Lee Seung-hoon	South Korea		7:40.41
15	Allan Dahl Johansson	Norway		7:40.42
16	Ethan Cepuran	United States		7:40.60
17	Antoine Gélinas-Beaulieu	Canada		7:41.54
18	Conor McDermott-Mostowy	United States		7:41.66
19	Philip Due Schmidt	Denmark		7:42.36
20	Livio Wenger	Switzerland		8:01.11

==== Team sprint ====
The race started on 18 November 2023 at 19:32.

Rank	Pair	Lane	Country	Time	Diff
1st place, gold medalist(s)	6	s	United States; Conor McDermott-Mostowy; Cooper McLeod; Zach Stoppelmoor	1:20.27	
2nd place, silver medalist(s)	4	c	China; Deng Zhihan; Du Haonan; Liu Bin	1:20.72	+0.45
3rd place, bronze medalist(s)	6	c	Netherlands; Janno Botman; Louis Hollaar; Wesly Dijs	1:20.73	+0.46
4	4	s	Norway; Pål Myhren Kristensen; Bjørn Magnussen; Håvard Holmefjord Lorentzen	1:20.99	+0.72
5	5	c	Poland; Marek Kania; Piotr Michalski; Damian Żurek	1:21.04	+0.77
6	3	s	Germany; Hendrik Dombek; Moritz Klein; Stefan Emele	1:21.23	+0.96
7	5	s	Italy; Francesco Betti; David Bosa; Alessio Trentini	1:21.65	+1.38
8	2	s	Canada; David La Rue; Laurent Dubreuil; Vincent De Haître	1:22.43	+2.16
9	3	c	South Korea; Kim Jun-ho; Kim Tae-yun; Yang Ho-jun	1:22.57	+2.30
10	2	c	Kazakhstan; Demyan Gavrilov; Artur Galiyev; Nikita Vazhenin	1:23.75	+3.48
11	1	s	Finland; Max Kokko; Juuso Lehtonen; Samuli Suomalainen	1:24.26	+3.99

=== Women's events ===
==== 1st 500 m ====
The race started on 17 November 2023 at 18:21.

Rank	Pair	Lane	Name	Country	Time	Diff
1st place, gold medalist(s)	9	i	Erin Jackson	United States	37.91	
2nd place, silver medalist(s)	10	o	Kimi Goetz	United States	37.92	+0.01
3rd place, bronze medalist(s)	9	o	Kim Min-sun	South Korea	38.00	+0.09
4	10	i	Jutta Leerdam	Netherlands	38.01	+0.10
5	6	o	Tian Ruining	China	38.19	+0.28
6	7	o	Marrit Fledderus	Netherlands	38.31	+0.40
6	8	o	Kurumi Inagawa	Japan	38.31	+0.40
8	3	i	Dione Voskamp	Netherlands	38.31	+0.40
9	2	o	Carolina Hiller	Canada	38.40	+0.49
10	3	o	Karolina Bosiek	Poland	38.53	+0.62
11	6	i	Vanessa Herzog	Austria	38.59	+0.68
12	8	i	Yukino Yoshida	Japan	38.62	+0.71
12	5	i	Lee Nah-yun	South Korea	38.64	+0.73
14	4	i	Kako Yamane	Japan	38.65	+0.74
15	1	i	Andżelika Wójcik	Poland	38.70	+0.79
16	1	o	Pei Chong	China	38.94	+1.03
17	7	i	Rio Yamada	Japan	38.95	+1.04
18	4	o	Alina Dauranova	Kazakhstan	38.98	+1.07
19	5	o	Naomi Verkerk	Netherlands	39.01	+1.10
20	2	i	Martyna Baran	Poland	39.11	+1.20

==== 2nd 500 m ====
The race started on 19 November 2023 at 17:00.

Rank	Pair	Lane	Name	Country	Time	Diff
1st place, gold medalist(s)	9	o	Erin Jackson	United States	37.54	
2nd place, silver medalist(s)	8	i	Kim Min-sun	South Korea	37.85	+0.31
3rd place, bronze medalist(s)	8	o	Jutta Leerdam	Netherlands	37.88	+0.34
4	10	o	Kimi Goetz	United States	38.02	+0.48
5	6	i	Tian Ruining	China	38.08	+0.54
6	10	i	Marrit Fledderus	Netherlands	38.27	+0.73
6	7	o	Yukino Yoshida	Japan	38.33	+0.79
8	3	i	Naomi Verkerk	Netherlands	38.43	+0.89
9	7	i	Femke Kok	Netherlands	38.57	+1.03
10	2	o	Sarah Warren	United States	38.57	+1.03
11	9	i	Kurumi Inagawa	Japan	38.59	+1.05
12	6	o	Rio Yamada	Japan	38.60	+1.06
13	2	i	Carolina Hiller	Canada	38.61	+1.07
14	5	o	Dione Voskamp	Netherlands	38.62	+1.08
15	4	o	Karolina Bosiek	Poland	38.73	+1.19
16	1	o	Serena Pergher	Italy	38.76	+1.22
17	5	i	Vanessa Herzog	Austria	38.76	+1.22
18	3	o	Kako Yamane	Japan	38.76	+1.22
19	1	i	Konami Soga	Japan	39.28	+1.74
20	4	i	Lee Nah-yun	South Korea	39.85	+2.31

==== 1000 m ====
The race started on 18 November 2023 at 17:00.

Rank	Pair	Lane	Name	Country	Time	Diff
1st place, gold medalist(s)	10	o	Miho Takagi	Japan	1:14.44	
2nd place, silver medalist(s)	8	i	Kimi Goetz	United States	1:14.45	+0.01
3rd place, bronze medalist(s)	9	o	Jutta Leerdam	Netherlands	1:14.88	+0.44
4	10	i	Li Qishi	China	1:15.66	+1.22
5	2	i	Antoinette Rijpma-de Jong	Netherlands	1:15.67	+1.23
6	9	i	Brittany Bowe	United States	1:15.95	+1.51
7	8	o	Han Mei	China	1:16.00	+1.56
8	3	o	Nadezhda Morozova	Kazakhstan	1:16.22	+1.78
9	5	i	Karolina Bosiek	Poland	1:16.63	+2.19
10	6	i	Ayano Sato	Japan	1:16.75	+2.31
11	3	i	Ellia Smeding	United Kingdom	1:16.90	+2.46
12	4	i	Rio Yamada	Japan	1:17.23	+2.79
13	5	o	Yekaterina Aydova	Kazakhstan	1:17.31	+2.87
14	7	i	Ivanie Blondin	Canada	1:17.32	+2.88
15	1	i	Kim Min-sun	South Korea	1:17.36	+2.92
16	4	o	Alina Dauranova	Kazakhstan	1:17.62	+3.18
17	6	o	Vanessa Herzog	Austria	1:18.27	+3.83
18	7	o	Sumire Kikuchi	Japan	1:18.77	+4.33
19	2	o	Lee Nah-yun	South Korea	1:24.90	+10.46

==== 1500 m ====
The race started on 17 November 2023 at 17:00.

Rank	Pair	Lane	Name	Country	Time	Diff
1st place, gold medalist(s)	8	i	Miho Takagi	Japan	1:55.52	
2nd place, silver medalist(s)	7	o	Han Mei	China	1:55.92	+0.40
3rd place, bronze medalist(s)	8	o	Li Qishi	China	1:57.01	+1.49
4	10	i	Joy Beune	Netherlands	1:57.14	+1.62
5	6	i	Ragne Wiklund	Norway	1:57.16	+1.64
6	1	o	Marijke Groenewoud	Netherlands	1:57.31	+1.79
7	9	i	Antoinette Rijpma-de Jong	Netherlands	1:57.32	+1.80
8	10	o	Kimi Goetz	United States	1:57.33	+1.81
9	9	o	Momoka Horikawa	Japan	1:57.66	+2.14
10	7	i	Brittany Bowe	United States	1:57.71	+2.19
11	5	i	Ivanie Blondin	Canada	1:58.14	+2.62
12	6	o	Valérie Maltais	Canada	1:58.18	+2.66
13	5	o	Ayano Sato	Japan	1:58.26	+2.74
14	3	o	Esther Kiel	Netherlands	1:58.88	+3.36
15	4	i	Mia Kilburg-Manganello	United States	1:59.32	+3.80
16	3	i	Kaitlyn McGregor	Switzerland	1:59.35	+3.83
17	1	i	Yang Binyu	China	2:00.84	+5.32
18	2	i	Yuna Onodera	Japan	2:00.86	+5.34
19	4	o	Isabelle Weidemann	Canada	2:01.29	+5.77
	2	o	Karolina Bosiek	Poland	Did not start	

==== 3000 m ====
The race started on 19 November 2023 at 18:13.

Rank	Pair	Lane	Name	Country	Time	Diff
1st place, gold medalist(s)	8	i	Ragne Wiklund	Norway	4:03.41	
2nd place, silver medalist(s)	8	o	Martina Sábliková	Czech Republic	4:04.86	+1.45
3rd place, bronze medalist(s)	5	i	Han Mei	China	4:05.45	+2.04
4	7	o	Joy Beune	Netherlands	4:06.20	+2.79
5	7	i	Valérie Maltais	Canada	4:09.51	+6.10
6	5	o	Isabelle Weidemann	Canada	4:09.84	+6.43
7	6	i	Sanne In 't Hof	Netherlands	4:10.01	+6.60
8	1	o	Irene Schouten	Netherlands	4:10.62	+7.21
9	6	o	Ivanie Blondin	Canada	4:11.21	+7.80
10	4	i	Magdalena Czyszczoń	Poland	4:11.32	+7.91
11	3	i	Yuna Onodera	Japan	4:11.81	+8.40
12	3	o	Mia Kilburg-Manganello	United States	4:12.95	+9.54
13	4	o	Yang Binyu	China	4:15.37	+11.96
14	2	i	Laura Hall	Canada	4:15.90	+12.49
15	2	o	Michelle Uhrig	Germany	4:19.76	+16.35
16	1	i	Greta Myers	United States	4:20.56	+17.15

==== Mass start ====
The race started on 18 November 2023 at 20:01.

Rank	Name	Country	Points	Time
1st place, gold medalist(s)	Marijke Groenewoud	Netherlands	63	8:24.71
2nd place, silver medalist(s)	Ivanie Blondin	Canada	40	8:37.58
3rd place, bronze medalist(s)	Valérie Maltais	Canada	20	8:37.74
4	Mia Kilburg-Manganello	United States	10	8:38.07
5	Irene Schouten	Netherlands	6	8:38.21
6	Jin Wenjing	China	3	8:39.27
7	Kaitlyn McGregor	Switzerland	3	8:41.02
8	Ramona Härdi	Switzerland	3	8:45.61
9	Sumire Kikuchi	Japan	2	8:41.91
10	Veronica Luciani	Italy	2	8:42.93
11	Park Ji-woo	South Korea	2	8:47.60
12	Kim Bo-reum	South Korea	1	8:39.46
13	Michelle Uhrig	Germany	1	8:42.87
14	Olga Piotrowska	Poland	1	8:52.09
15	Sandrine Tas	Belgium		8:39.61
16	Josephine Heimerl	Germany		8:39.90
17	Yuka Takahashi	Japan		8:40.09
18	Lucie Korvasová	Czech Republic		8:41.04
19	Giorgia Birkeland	United States		8:41.17
20	Magdalena Czyszczoń	Poland		8:41.74
21	Zuzana Kuršová	Czech Republic		8:42.41
22	Chen Aoyu	China		8:43.40
	Laura Lorenzato	Italy	Disqualified	

==== Team sprint ====
The race started on 19 November 2023 at 19:13.

Rank	Pair	Lane	Country	Time	Diff
1st place, gold medalist(s)	4	c	Netherlands; Naomi Verkerk; Helga Drost; Antoinette Rijpma-de Jong	1:27.74	
2nd place, silver medalist(s)	2	c	Canada; Ivanie Blondin; Brooklyn McDougall; Maddison Pearman	1:28.76	+1.02
3rd place, bronze medalist(s)	4	s	Poland; Iga Wojtasik; Karolina Bosiek; Andżelika Wójcik	1:29.09	+1.35
4	5	s	China; Han Mei; Li Qishi; Tian Ruining	1:29.36	+1.62
5	1	s	Kazakhstan; Yekaterina Aydova; Nadezhda Morozova; Alina Dauranova	1:30.16	+2.42
6	3	s	Japan; Konami Soga; Yukino Yoshida; Kako Yamane	1:31.12	+3.38
7	3	c	Germany; Anna Ostlender; Michelle Uhrig; Lea Sophie Scholz	1:32.10	+4.36
8	2	s	South Korea; Kim Min-ji; Park Chae-eun; Kang Soo-min	1:37.07	+9.33
	5	c	United States; Sarah Warren; Erin Jackson; Kimi Goetz	Disqualified	
