= 2023–24 ISU Speed Skating World Cup – World Cup 3 =

Ice skating competition in Stavanger, Norway

2023–24 ISU Speed Skating World Cup 3
- Venue: Sørmarka Arena; Stavanger; Norway
- Dates: 1 — 3 December 2023

The third competition weekend of the 2023–24 ISU Speed Skating World Cup is being held at the Sørmarka Arena in Stavanger, Norway, from Friday, 1 December, until Sunday, 3 December 2023.

== Medal summary ==
=== Men's events ===
Event	Gold	Time	Silver	Time	Bronze	Time	Report
500 m	Wataru Morishige; Japan	34.65	Gao Tingyu; China	34.66	Tatsuya Shinhama; Japan	34.71	
1000 m	Kjeld Nuis; Netherlands	1:08.76	Tatsuya Shinhama; Japan	1:08.88	Kazuya Yamada; Japan	1:09.10	
1500 m	Jordan Stolz; United States	1:44.67; TR	Kjeld Nuis; Netherlands	1:45.34	Kazuya Yamada; Japan	1:45.74	
10000 m	Davide Ghiotto; Italy	13:02.71	Ted-Jan Bloemen; Canada	13:12.33	Michele Malfatti; Italy	13:12.89	
Mass start^{A}	Marcel Bosker; Netherlands	62	Livio Wenger; Switzerland	40	Bart Swings; Belgium	20	
Team sprint	Norway; Pål Myhren Kristensen; Bjørn Magnussen; Håvard Holmefjord Lorentzen	1:19.30	United States; Austin Kleba; Cooper McLeod; Zach Stoppelmoor	1:19.49	Poland; Marek Kania; Piotr Michalski; Damian Żurek	1:19.99	

^{A} In mass start, race points are accumulated during the race based on results of the intermediate sprints and the final sprint. The skater with most race points is the winner.

=== Women's events ===
Event	Gold	Time	Silver	Time	Bronze	Time	Report
500 m	Kim Min-sun; South Korea	37.73	Erin Jackson; United States	37.75	Femke Kok; Netherlands	38.01	
1000 m	Jutta Leerdam; Netherlands	1:15.26	Miho Takagi; Japan	1:15.52	Antoinette Rijpma-de Jong; Netherlands	1:15.74	
1500 m	Miho Takagi; Japan	1:55.87	Antoinette Rijpma-de Jong; Netherlands	1:56.95	Marijke Groenewoud; Netherlands	1:56.99	
5000 m	Martina Sábliková; Czech Republic	6:59.60	Marijke Groenewoud; Netherlands	7:03.27	Ragne Wiklund; Norway	7:03.60	
Mass start^{A}	Irene Schouten; Netherlands	63	Valérie Maltais; Canada	43	Mia Kilburg-Manganello; United States	26	
Team sprint	United States; Sarah Warren; Erin Jackson; Kimi Goetz	1:27.92	Netherlands; Marrit Fledderus; Femke Kok; Antoinette Rijpma-de Jong	1:28.17	Canada; Carolina Hiller; Maddison Pearman; Ivanie Blondin	1:28.34	

^{A} In mass start, race points are accumulated during the race based on results of the intermediate sprints and the final sprint. The skater with most race points is the winner.

== Results ==
=== Men's events ===
==== 500 m ====
The race started on 2 December 2023 at 14:30.

Rank	Pair	Lane	Name	Country	Time	Diff
1st place, gold medalist(s)	8	o	Wataru Morishige	Japan	34.65	
2nd place, silver medalist(s)	1	o	Gao Tingyu	China	34.66	+0.01
3rd place, bronze medalist(s)	10	i	Tatsuya Shinhama	Japan	34.71	+0.06
4	8	i	Yuma Murakami	Japan	34.90	+0.25
5	10	o	Kim Jun-ho	South Korea	35.00	+0.35
6	9	o	Laurent Dubreuil	Canada	35.05	+0.40
7	5	o	Damian Żurek	Poland	35.09	+0.44
8	2	i	Håvard Holmefjord Lorentzen	Norway	35.10	+0.45
9	2	o	Takuya Morimoto	Japan	35.11	+0.46
10	3	o	Hein Otterspeer	Netherlands	35.12	+0.47
11	4	o	Bjørn Magnussen	Norway	35.15	+0.50
12	6	i	Janno Botman	Netherlands	35.16	+0.51
13	9	i	Yudai Yamamoto	Japan	35.21	+0.56
14	6	o	Nil Llop	Spain	35.35	+0.70
15	1	i	Haonan Du	China	35.39	+0.74
16	5	i	Marek Kania	Poland	35.40	+0.75
17	7	i	Merijn Scheperkamp	Netherlands	35.45	+0.80
18	3	i	Cooper McLeod	United States	35.53	+0.88
19	4	i	Piotr Michalski	Poland	35.68	+1.03
20	7	o	David Bosa	Italy	35.69	+1.04

==== 1000 m ====
The race started on 1 December 2023 at 20:35.

Rank	Pair	Lane	Name	Country	Time	Diff
1st place, gold medalist(s)	8	o	Kjeld Nuis	Netherlands	1:08.76	
2nd place, silver medalist(s)	8	i	Tatsuya Shinhama	Japan	1:08.88	+0.12
3rd place, bronze medalist(s)	5	i	Kazuya Yamada	Japan	1:09.10	+0.34
4	3	i	Damian Żurek	Poland	1:09.16	+0.40
5	7	o	Jenning de Boo	Netherlands	1:09.24	+0.48
6	10	o	Taiyo Nonomura	Japan	1:09.29	+0.53
7	9	o	Ning Zhongyan	China	1:09.30	+0.54
8	10	i	Håvard Holmefjord Lorentzen	Norway	1:09.32	+0.56
9	6	o	Tim Prins	Netherlands	1:09.49	+0.73
10	9	i	Masaya Yamada	Japan	1:09.60	+0.84
11	5	o	Marten Liiv	Estonia	1:09.77	+1.01
12	1	o	Hendrik Dombek	Germany	1:09.79	+1.03
13	2	o	Tijmen Snel	Netherlands	1:09.82	+1.06
14	7	i	David Bosa	Italy	1:09.91	+1.15
15	6	i	Moritz Klein	Germany	1:09.92	+1.16
16	4	o	Connor Howe	Canada	1:10.04	+1.28
17	4	i	Vincent De Haître	Canada	1:10.09	+1.33
18	1	i	Laurent Dubreuil	Canada	1:10.37	+1.61
19	3	o	Cooper McLeod	United States	1:10.84	+2.08
20	2	i	Zach Stoppelmoor	United States	1:25.73	+16.97

==== 1500 m ====
The race started on 3 December 2023 at 14:30.

Rank	Pair	Lane	Name	Country	Time	Diff
1st place, gold medalist(s)	4	o	Jordan Stolz	United States	1:44.67	
2nd place, silver medalist(s)	9	i	Kjeld Nuis	Netherlands	1:45.34	+0.67
3rd place, bronze medalist(s)	5	i	Kazuya Yamada	Japan	1:45.74	+1.07
4	8	i	Patrick Roest	Netherlands	1:45.78	+1.11
5	9	o	Ning Zhongyan	China	1:46.06	+1.39
6	6	i	Hallgeir Engebråten	Norway	1:46.51	+1.84
7	5	o	Peder Kongshaug	Norway	1:46.57	+1.90
8	3	i	Allan Dahl Johansson	Norway	1:46.57	+1.90
9	6	o	Thomas Krol	Netherlands	1:46.79	+2.12
10	10	o	Sander Eitrem	Norway	1:47.01	+2.34
11	3	o	Riku Tsuchiya	Japan	1:47.10	+2.43
12	4	i	Bart Swings	Belgium	1:47.12	+2.45
13	7	o	Taiyo Nonomura	Japan	1:47.19	+2.52
14	7	i	Hendrik Dombek	Germany	1:47.28	+2.61
15	10	i	Wesly Dijs	Netherlands	1:47.34	+2.67
16	2	i	Connor Howe	Canada	1:47.78	+3.11
17	1	i	Louis Hollaar	Netherlands	1:48.04	+3.37
18	2	o	Antoine Gélinas-Beaulieu	Canada	1:48.08	+3.41
19	8	o	Masaya Yamada	Japan	1:48.61	+3.94
20	1	o	Moritz Klein	Germany	1:48.66	+3.99

==== 10000 m ====
The race started on 2 December 2023 at 15:51.

Rank	Pair	Lane	Name	Country	Time	Diff
1st place, gold medalist(s)	4	i	Davide Ghiotto	Italy	13:02.71	
2nd place, silver medalist(s)	5	o	Ted-Jan Bloemen	Canada	13:12.33	+9.62
3rd place, bronze medalist(s)	4	o	Michele Malfatti	Italy	13:12.89	+10.18
4	2	o	Jorrit Bergsma	Netherlands	13:16.88	+14.17
5	3	o	Bart Swings	Belgium	13:18.34	+15.63
6	3	i	Hallgeir Engebråten	Norway	13:21.31	+18.60
7	6	o	Sander Eitrem	Norway	13:22.35	+19.64
8	5	i	Patrick Roest	Netherlands	13:23.96	+21.25
9	1	i	Kars Jansman	Netherlands	13:29.83	+27.12
10	2	i	Casey Dawson	United States	13:32.68	+29.97
11	6	i	Sverre Lunde Pedersen	Norway	13:42.59	+39.88
12	1	o	Beau Snellink	Netherlands	13:51.82	+49.11

==== Mass start ====
The race started on 1 December 2023 at 21:45.

Rank	Name	Country	Points	Time
1st place, gold medalist(s)	Marcel Bosker	Netherlands	62	7:57.11
2nd place, silver medalist(s)	Livio Wenger	Switzerland	40	7:58.51
3rd place, bronze medalist(s)	Bart Swings	Belgium	20	7:58.51
4	Peter Michael	New Zealand	13	7:58.52
5	Andrea Giovannini	Italy	6	7:58.66
6	Chung Jae-won	South Korea	3	7:58.83
7	Timothy Loubineaud	France	3	7:58.91
8	Ethan Cepuran	United States	3	8:18.45
9	Artur Janicki	Poland	2	7:58.94
10	Conor McDermott-Mostowy	United States	2	8:08.84
11	Felix Rhijnen	Germany	2	8:30.73
12	Gabriel Odor	Austria	1	7:59.45
13	Kota Kikuchi	Japan		7:58.89
14	Antoine Gélinas-Beaulieu	Canada		7:59.20
15	Kristian Gamme Ulekleiv	Norway		8:00.09
16	Lee Seung-hoon	South Korea		8:00.24
17	Felix Maly	Germany		8:00.82
18	Connor Howe	Canada		8:07.84
19	Daniele Di Stefano	Italy		8:29.77
20	Bart Hoolwerf	Netherlands		8:49.26

==== Team sprint ====
The race started on 3 December 2023 at 16:53.

Rank	Pair	Lane	Country	Time	Diff
1st place, gold medalist(s)	3	s	Norway; Pål Myhren Kristensen; Bjørn Magnussen; Håvard Holmefjord Lorentzen	1:19.30	
2nd place, silver medalist(s)	4	c	United States; Austin Kleba; Cooper McLeod; Zach Stoppelmoor	1:19.49	+0.19
3rd place, bronze medalist(s)	5	s	Poland; Marek Kania; Piotr Michalski; Damian Żurek	1:19.99	+0.69
4	4	s	China; Deng Zhihan; Du Haonan; Ning Zhongyan	1:20.63	+1.33
5	2	s	Canada; Joshua Telizyn; Anders Johnson; Vincent De Haître	1:21.59	+2.29
6	3	c	Germany; Maximilian Strübe; Moritz Klein; Hendrik Dombek	1:21.83	+2.53
7	2	c	South Korea; Kim Jun-ho; Cho Sang-hyeok; Yang Ho-jun	1:23.20	+3.90
8	1	s	Kazakhstan; Yevgeniy Koshkin; Nikita Vazhenin; Dmitry Morozov	1:24.73	+5.43
	5	c	Netherlands; Merijn Scheperkamp; Hein Otterspeer; Tijmen Snel	Did not finish	

=== Women's events ===
==== 500 m ====
The race started on 3 December 2023 at 15:11.

Rank	Pair	Lane	Name	Country	Time	Diff
1st place, gold medalist(s)	9	o	Kim Min-sun	South Korea	37.73	
2nd place, silver medalist(s)	8	o	Erin Jackson	United States	37.75	+0.02
3rd place, bronze medalist(s)	7	o	Femke Kok	Netherlands	38.01	+0.28
4	8	i	Kimi Goetz	United States	38.29	+0.56
5	6	o	Rio Yamada	Japan	38.38	+0.65
6	5	o	Vanessa Herzog	Austria	38.41	+0.68
7	5	i	Naomi Verkerk	Netherlands	38.47	+0.74
8	7	i	Tian Ruining	China	38.48	+0.75
9	9	i	Marrit Fledderus	Netherlands	38.53	+0.80
10	2	o	Andżelika Wójcik	Poland	38.59	+0.86
11	2	i	Carolina Hiller	Canada	38.63	+0.90
12	10	i	Jutta Leerdam	Netherlands	38.64	+0.91
13	1	o	Brittany Bowe	United States	38.67	+0.94
14	3	o	Sarah Warren	United States	38.69	+0.96
15	6	i	Yukino Yoshida	Japan	38.78	+1.05
16	4	i	Dione Voskamp	Netherlands	38.79	+1.06
17	4	o	Karolina Bosiek	Poland	38.82	+1.09
18	10	o	Kurumi Inagawa	Japan	38.89	+1.16
19	3	i	Lee Na-hyun	South Korea	38.90	+1.17
20	1	i	Pei Chong	China	38.97	+1.24

==== 1000 m ====
The race started on 1 December 2023 at 20:00.

Rank	Pair	Lane	Name	Country	Time	Diff
1st place, gold medalist(s)	10	o	Jutta Leerdam	Netherlands	1:15.26	
2nd place, silver medalist(s)	8	o	Miho Takagi	Japan	1:15.52	+0.26
3rd place, bronze medalist(s)	9	i	Antoinette Rijpma-de Jong	Netherlands	1:15.74	+0.48
4	8	i	Kimi Goetz	United States	1:15.88	+0.62
5	5	o	Nadezhda Morozova	Kazakhstan	1:16.05	+0.79
6	9	o	Brittany Bowe	United States	1:16.08	+0.82
7	3	i	Kim Min-sun	South Korea	1:16.43	+1.17
8	7	i	Ivanie Blondin	Canada	1:16.47	+1.21
9	10	i	Han Mei	China	1:16.54	+1.28
10	5	i	Rio Yamada	Japan	1:17.39	+2.13
11	2	o	Tian Ruining	China	1:17.42	+2.16
12	6	i	Karolina Bosiek	Poland	1:17.43	+2.17
13	4	o	Sumire Kikuchi	Japan	1:17.45	+2.19
14	4	i	Yekaterina Aydova	Kazakhstan	1:17.57	+2.31
15	6	o	Ellia Smeding	United Kingdom	1:17.62	+2.36
16	7	o	Ayano Sato	Japan	1:17.83	+2.57
17	2	i	Lee Nah-yun	South Korea	1:17.87	+2.61
18	1	o	Ragne Wiklund	Norway	1:18.16	+2.90
19	3	o	Alina Dauranova	Kazakhstan	1:18.23	+2.97
20	1	i	Maddison Pearman	Canada	1:18.84	+3.58

==== 1500 m ====
The race started on 2 December 2023 at 15:00.

Rank	Pair	Lane	Name	Country	Time	Diff
1st place, gold medalist(s)	8	o	Miho Takagi	Japan	1:55.87	
2nd place, silver medalist(s)	9	o	Antoinette Rijpma-de Jong	Netherlands	1:56.95	+1.08
3rd place, bronze medalist(s)	2	i	Marijke Groenewoud	Netherlands	1:56.99	+1.12
4	10	i	Han Mei	China	1:58.06	+2.19
5	7	i	Brittany Bowe	United States	1:58.07	+2.20
6	4	o	Nadezhda Morozova	Kazakhstan	1:58.33	+2.46
7	6	i	Ivanie Blondin	Canada	1:58.39	+2.52
8	6	o	Ayano Sato	Japan	1:58.80	+2.93
9	8	i	Kimi Goetz	United States	1:59.12	+3.25
10	9	i	Ragne Wiklund	Norway	1:59.12	+3.25
11	7	o	Valérie Maltais	Canada	1:59.47	+3.60
12	1	o	Melissa Wijfje	Netherlands	1:59.76	+3.89
13	5	o	Esther Kiel	Netherlands	2:00.38	+4.51
14	3	i	Yuna Onodera	Japan	2:00.44	+4.57
15	5	i	Mia Kilburg-Manganello	United States	2:00.56	+4.69
16	4	i	Kaitlyn McGregor	Switzerland	2:00.95	+5.08
17	3	o	Yang Binyu	China	2:00.96	+5.09
18	10	o	Momoka Horikawa	Japan	2:01.29	+5.42
19	2	o	Sumire Kikuchi	Japan	2:01.43	+5.56
20	1	i	Isabelle van Elst	Belgium	2:02.63	+6.76

==== 5000 m ====
The race started on 3 December 2023 at 15:50.

Rank	Pair	Lane	Name	Country	Time	Diff
1st place, gold medalist(s)	4	o	Martina Sábliková	Czech Republic	6:59.60	
2nd place, silver medalist(s)	1	o	Marijke Groenewoud	Netherlands	7:03.27	+3.67
3rd place, bronze medalist(s)	6	i	Ragne Wiklund	Norway	7:03.60	+4.00
4	6	o	Valérie Maltais	Canada	7:05.60	+6.00
5	5	i	Han Mei	China	7:08.40	+8.80
6	5	o	Sanne In 't Hof	Netherlands	7:10.35	+10.75
7	2	o	Momoka Horikawa	Japan	7:11.43	+11.83
8	4	i	Ivanie Blondin	Canada	7:14.42	+14.82
9	3	o	Yang Binyu	China	7:21.15	+21.55
10	3	i	Magdalena Czyszczoń	Poland	7:25.51	+25.91
11	2	i	Yuna Onodera	Japan	7:32.58	+32.98
12	1	i	Laura Hall	Canada	7:38.79	+39.19

==== Mass start ====
The race started on 1 December 2023 at 21:22.

Rank	Name	Country	Points	Time
1st place, gold medalist(s)	Irene Schouten	Netherlands	63	8:36.25
2nd place, silver medalist(s)	Valérie Maltais	Canada	43	8:37.19
3rd place, bronze medalist(s)	Mia Kilburg-Manganello	United States	26	8:40.01
4	Magdalena Czyszczoń	Poland	10	8:58.51
5	Sandrine Tas	Belgium		7:36.73
6	Olga Piotrowska	Poland		6:37.93
	Lucie Korvasová	Czech Republic	Disqualified	
	Ivanie Blondin	Canada	Disqualified	
	Park Ji-woo	South Korea	Disqualified	
	Jin Wenjing	China	Disqualified	
	Ramona Härdi	Switzerland	Disqualified	
	Kaitlyn McGregor	Switzerland	Disqualified	
	Josephine Heimerl	Germany	Disqualified	
	Marijke Groenewoud	Netherlands	Disqualified	
	Michelle Uhrig	Germany	Disqualified	
	Giorgia Birkeland	United States	Disqualified	

==== Team sprint ====
The race started on 3 December 2023 at 17:18.

Rank	Pair	Lane	Country	Time	Diff
1st place, gold medalist(s)	3	c	United States; Sarah Warren; Erin Jackson; Kimi Goetz	1:27.92	
2nd place, silver medalist(s)	4	s	Netherlands; Marrit Fledderus; Femke Kok; Antoinette Rijpma-de Jong	1:28.17	+0.25
3rd place, bronze medalist(s)	3	s	Canada; Carolina Hiller; Maddison Pearman; Ivanie Blondin	1:28.34	+0.42
4	5	c	Poland; Andżelika Wójcik; Martyna Baran; Karolina Bosiek	1:29.71	+1.79
5	2	s	Kazakhstan; Alina Dauranova; Yekaterina Aydova; Nadezhda Morozova	1:29.83	+1.91
6	5	s	China; Pei Chong; Hai Tiange; Tian Ruining	1:30.24	+2.32
7	4	c	Germany; Sophie Warmuth; Anna Ostlender; Lea Sophie Scholtz	1:31.68	+3.76
8	1	s	South Korea; Lee Na-hyun; Kim Min-ji; Park Chae-eun	1:32.88	+4.96
9	2	c	Norway; Carina Jagtøyen; Julie Nistad Samsonsen; Martine Ripsrud	1:32.91	+4.99
