= 2024 European Speed Skating Championships – Women's 3000 metres =

Women's 3000 metres at the 2024 European Speed Skating Championships
- Venue: Thialf
- Location: Heerenveen, Netherlands
- Dates: 5 January
- Competitors: 16 from 8 nations
- Winning time: 3:56.27

Medalists
gold medal	Marijke Groenewoud	Netherlands
silver medal	Irene Schouten	Netherlands
bronze medal	Ragne Wiklund	Norway

The women's 3000 metres competition at the 2024 European Speed Skating Championships was held on 5 January 2024.

== Results ==
The race was started at 20:28.

Rank	Pair	Lane	Name	Country	Time	Diff
1st place, gold medalist(s)	8	i	Marijke Groenewoud	Netherlands	3:56.27	
2nd place, silver medalist(s)	7	o	Irene Schouten	Netherlands	3:58.70	+2.43
3rd place, bronze medalist(s)	8	o	Ragne Wiklund	Norway	3:59.09	+2.82
4	7	i	Elisa Dul	Netherlands	3:59.30	+3.03
5	4	o	Francesca Lollobrigida	Italy	4:00.96	+4.69
6	4	i	Kaitlyn McGregor	Switzerland	4:07.29	+11.02
7	6	o	Magdalena Czyszczoń	Poland	4:09.53	+13.26
8	3	i	Sofie Karoline Haugen	Norway	4:12.30	+16.03
9	5	o	Josie Hofmann	Germany	4:13.13	+16.86
10	6	i	Laura Lorenzato	Italy	4:13.98	+17.71
11	2	o	Sandrine Tas	Belgium	4:14.19	+17.92
12	5	i	Ramona Härdi	Switzerland	4:14.35	+18.08
13	1	i	Aurora Grinden Løvås	Norway	4:14.52	+18.25
14	1	o	Maira Jasch	Germany	4:15.63	+19.36
15	3	o	Michelle Uhrig	Germany	4:15.77	+19.50
16	2	i	Zuzana Kuršová	Czech Republic	4:16.19	+19.92
