= 2024 World Allround Speed Skating Championships – Women =

Men at the 2024 World Allround Speed Skating Championships
- Venue: Max Aicher Arena
- Location: Inzell, Germany
- Dates: 9–10 March
- Competitors: 24 from 14 nations
- Winning points: 157.268

Medalists
gold medal	Joy Beune	Netherlands
silver medal	Marijke Groenewoud	Netherlands
bronze medal	Antoinette Rijpma-de Jong	Netherlands

The Women competition at the 2024 World Allround Speed Skating Championships was held on 9 and 10 March 2024.

== Results ==
=== 500 m ===
The race was started on 9 March at 12:45.

Rank	Pair	Lane	Name	Country	Time	Diff
1	12	O	Miho Takagi	Japan	37.56	
2	3	I	Han Mei	China	38.01	+0.45
3	2	O	Ayano Sato	Japan	38.21	+0.65
4	10	O	Antoinette Rijpma-de Jong	Netherlands	38.35	+0.79
5	10	I	Yekaterina Aydova	Kazakhstan	38.47	+0.91
6	12	I	Marijke Groenewoud	Netherlands	38.64	+1.08
7	11	O	Ivanie Blondin	Canada	38.74	+1.18
8	11	I	Greta Myers	United States	38.89	+1.33
9	5	I	Francesca Lollobrigida	Italy	39.12	+1.56
10	8	I	Joy Beune	Netherlands	39.17	+1.61
11	3	O	Yang Binyu	China	39.22	+1.66
12	9	I	Kaitlyn McGregor	Switzerland	39.25	+1.69
13	2	I	Valérie Maltais	Canada	39.36	+1.80
14	4	O	Sandrine Tas	Belgium	39.62	+2.06
15	7	I	Park Ji-woo	South Korea	39.70	+2.14
16	9	O	Abigail McCluskey	Canada	39.73	+2.17
17	1	I	Momoka Horikawa	Japan	39.85	+2.29
18	8	O	Aurora Grinden Løvås	Norway	40.05	+2.49
19	5	O	Ragne Wiklund	Norway	40.08	+2.52
20	1	O	Josephine Schlörb	Germany	40.64	+3.08
21	7	O	Ramona Härdi	Switzerland	40.77	+3.21
22	4	I	Sofie Karoline Haugen	Norway	41.13	+3.57
23	6	O	Magdalena Czyszczoń	Poland	41.31	+3.75
24	6	I	Zuzana Kuršová	Czech Republic	41.37	+3.81

=== 3000 m ===
The race was started on 9 March at 14:00.

Rank	Pair	Lane	Name	Country	Time	Diff
1	10	O	Joy Beune	Netherlands	3:55.72 TR	
2	12	I	Marijke Groenewoud	Netherlands	3:57.94	+2.22
3	11	O	Ragne Wiklund	Norway	3:58.29	+2.57
4	10	I	Francesca Lollobrigida	Italy	3:59.80	+4.08
5	12	O	Antoinette Rijpma-de Jong	Netherlands	4:01.05	+5.33
6	11	I	Valérie Maltais	Canada	4:01.35	+5.63
7	8	O	Momoka Horikawa	Japan	4:01.89	+6.17
8	7	O	Han Mei	China	4:03.70	+7.89
9	7	I	Ivanie Blondin	Canada	4:04.23	+8.51
10	9	I	Ayano Sato	Japan	4:04.78	+9.06
11	5	I	Miho Takagi	Japan	4:05.41	+9.69
12	8	I	Kaitlyn McGregor	Switzerland	4:05.92	+10.20
13	4	I	Greta Myers	United States	4:06.43	+10.71
14	4	O	Sandrine Tas	Belgium	4:07.95	+12.23
15	9	O	Yang Binyu	China	4:09.26	+13.54
16	6	O	Abigail McCluskey	Canada	4:09.37	+13.65
17	5	O	Magdalena Czyszczoń	Poland	4:10.97	+15.25
18	6	I	Sofie Karoline Haugen	Norway	4:11.09	+15.37
19	3	O	Aurora Grinden Løvås	Norway	4:11.66	+15.94
20	2	I	Ramona Härdi	Switzerland	4:14.99	+19.27
21	2	O	Zuzana Kuršová	Czech Republic	4:17.09	+21.37
22	1	O	Josephine Schlörb	Germany	4:18.05	+22.33
23	3	I	Yekaterina Aydova	Kazakhstan	4:19.91	+24.19
24	1	I	Park Ji-woo	South Korea	4:24.49	+28.77

=== 1500 m ===
The race was started on 10 March at 13:15.

Rank	Pair	Lane	Name	Country	Time	Diff
1	12	O	Joy Beune	Netherlands	1:52.65 TR	
2	11	I	Han Mei	China	1:52.97	+0.32
3	11	O	Antoinette Rijpma-de Jong	Netherlands	1:53.45	+0.80
4	9	O	Ivanie Blondin	Canada	1:53.96	+1.31
5	12	I	Marijke Groenewoud	Netherlands	1:54.06	+1.41
6	10	O	Ayano Sato	Japan	1:54.15	+1.50
7	10	I	Francesca Lollobrigida	Italy	1:54.19	+1.54
8	9	I	Valérie Maltais	Canada	1:54.73	+2.08
9	8	O	Ragne Wiklund	Norway	1:55.04	+2.39
10	8	I	Greta Myers	United States	1:55.67	+3.02
11	7	I	Kaitlyn McGregor	Switzerland	1:56.15	+3.50
12	7	O	Momoka Horikawa	Japan	1:56.71	+4.06
13	6	O	Yang Binyu	China	1:57.19	+4.54
14	6	I	Sandrine Tas	Belgium	1:57.44	+4.79
15	5	O	Abigail McCluskey	Canada	1:58.25	+5.60
16	5	I	Yekaterina Aydova	Kazakhstan	1:58.64	+5.99
17	4	O	Aurora Grinden Løvås	Norway	1:58.73	+6.08
18	4	I	Sofie Karoline Haugen	Norway	1:59.57	+6.92
19	3	O	Magdalena Czyszczoń	Poland	1:59.88	+7.23
20	3	I	Ramona Härdi	Switzerland	2:00.40	+7.75
21	2	O	Josephine Schlörb	Germany	2:00.76	+8.11
22	2	I	Park Ji-woo	South Korea	2:01.37	+8.72
23	1	O	Zuzana Kuršová	Czech Republic	2:02.60	+9.95

=== 5000 m ===
The race was started on 10 March at 15:04.

Rank	Pair	Lane	Name	Country	Time	Diff
1	4	I	Joy Beune	Netherlands	6:52.62	
2	1	O	Ragne Wiklund	Norway	6:53.51	+0.89
3	3	I	Marijke Groenewoud	Netherlands	6:54.04	+1.42
4	2	O	Francesca Lollobrigida	Italy	6:58.75	+6.13
5	3	O	Antoinette Rijpma-de Jong	Netherlands	6:58.78	+6.16
6	4	O	Han Mei	China	7:07.43	+14.81
7	1	I	Valérie Maltais	Canada	7:08.71	+16.09
8	2	I	Ayano Sato	Japan	7:09.94	+17.32

=== Overall standings ===
After all events.

Rank	Name	Country	500m	3000m	1500m	5000m	Points	Diff
1st place, gold medalist(s)	Joy Beune	Netherlands	39.17	3:55.72	1:52.65	6:52.62	157.268	
2nd place, silver medalist(s)	Marijke Groenewoud	Netherlands	38.64	3:57.94	1:54.06	6:54.04	157.720	+4.52
3rd place, bronze medalist(s)	Antoinette Rijpma-de Jong	Netherlands	38.35	4:01.05	1:53.45	6:58.78	158.219	+9.51
4	Francesca Lollobrigida	Italy	39.12	3:59.80	1:54.19	6:58.75	159.025	+17.56
5	Han Mei	China	38.01	4:03.70	1:52.97	7:07.43	159.026	+17.57
6	Ragne Wiklund	Norway	40.08	3:58.29	1:55.04	6:53.51	159.492	+22.24
7	Ayano Sato	Japan	38.21	4:04.78	1:54.15	7:09.94	160.050	+27.82
8	Valérie Maltais	Canada	39.35	4:01.35	1:54.73	7:08.71	160.689	+34.21
9	Ivanie Blondin	Canada	38.72	4:04.23	1:53.96	—N/a	117.411	
10	Greta Myers	United States	38.89	4:06.43	1:55.67	—N/a	118.518	
11	Kaitlyn McGregor	Switzerland	39.25	4:05.92	1:56.15	—N/a	118.953	
12	Momoka Horikawa	Japan	39.85	4:01.89	1:56.71	—N/a	119.068	
13	Yang Binyu	China	39.22	4:09.26	1:57.19	—N/a	119.826	
14	Sandrine Tas	Belgium	39.62	4:07.95	1:57.44	—N/a	120.091	
15	Abigail McCluskey	Canada	39.73	4:09.37	1:58.25	—N/a	120.708	
16	Yekaterina Aydova	Kazakhstan	38.47	4:19.91	1:58.64	—N/a	121.335	
17	Aurora Grinden Løvås	Norway	40.05	4:11.66	1:58.73	—N/a	121.570	
18	Sofie Karoline Haugen	Norway	41.13	4:11.09	1:59.57	—N/a	122.835	
19	Magdalena Czyszczoń	Poland	41.31	4:10.97	1:59.88	—N/a	123.098	
20	Ramona Härdi	Switzerland	40.77	4:14.99	2:00.40	—N/a	123.401	
21	Josephine Schlörb	Germany	40.64	4:18.05	2:00.76	—N/a	123.901	
22	Park Ji-woo	South Korea	39.70	4:24.49	2:01.37	—N/a	124.238	
23	Zuzana Kuršová	Czech Republic	41.37	4:17.09	2:02.60	—N/a	125.085	
–	Miho Takagi	Japan	37.56	4:05.41	DNS	—N/a	Did not finish	
