= 2022 European Speed Skating Championships – Women's mass start =

Women's mass start at the 2022 European Speed Skating Championships
- Venue: Thialf
- Location: Heerenveen, Netherlands
- Dates: 9 January
- Competitors: 20 from 11 nations
- Winning points: 60

Medalists
| gold medal | Irene Schouten | Netherlands |
| silver medal | Marijke Groenewoud | Netherlands |
| bronze medal | Elizaveta Golubeva | Russia |

The women's mass start competition at the 2022 European Speed Skating Championships was held on 9 January 2022.

== Results ==
The race was started at 16:50.

| Rank | Name | Country | Points | Time |
|---|---|---|---|---|
| 1st place, gold medalist(s) | Irene Schouten | Netherlands | 60 | 8:27.98 |
| 2nd place, silver medalist(s) | Marijke Groenewoud | Netherlands | 42 | 8:28.16 |
| 3rd place, bronze medalist(s) | Elizaveta Golubeva | Russia | 20 | 8:28.79 |
| 4 | Francesca Lollobrigida | Italy | 12 | 8:29.00 |
| 5 | Laura Peveri | Italy | 6 | 8:30.34 |
| 6 | Maryna Zuyeva | Belarus | 5 | 8:33.20 |
| 7 | Elena Sokhryakova | Russia | 5 | 8:45.64 |
| 8 | Karolina Bosiek | Poland | 3 | 8:31.46 |
| 9 | Gemma Cooper | Great Britain | 3 | 8:48.05 |
| 10 | Michelle Uhrig | Germany | 0 | 8:31.52 |
| 11 | Ramona Härdi | Switzerland | 0 | 8:33.09 |
| 12 | Sofie Karoline Haugen | Norway | 0 | 8:33.50 |
| 13 | Magdalena Czyszczoń | Poland | 0 | 8:39.59 |
| 14 | Zuzana Kuršová | Czech Republic | 0 | 8:42.57 |
| 15 | Claudia Pechstein | Germany | 0 | 8:46.60 |
| 16 | Veronika Antošová | Czech Republic | 0 | 8:55.53 |
| 17 | Katharina Thien | Austria | 0 | 9:20.14 |
| 18 | Nadja Wenger | Switzerland | 0 | DNF |
| 19 | Natalie Kerschbaummayr | Austria | 0 | DNF |
| 20 | Marit Fjellanger Bøhm | Norway | 0 | DNF |
| | Sandrine Tas | Belgium | Did not start | |
| | Yauheniya Varabyova | Belarus | Did not start | |
| | Ainoa Carreño | Spain | Did not start | |
