= European Speed Skating Championships for Women =

International speed skating competition

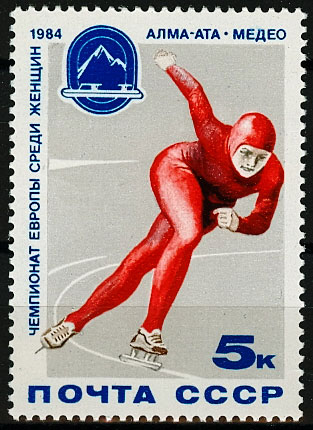
A Soviet stamp dedicated to the 1984 European Speed Skating Championships for Women

The International Skating Union has organised the European Speed Skating Championships for Women since 1970, but they were discontinued after the 1974 tournament because of lack of interest. The European Championships for Women were reinstated in 1981.

== History ==
=== Distances used ===
- In the years 1970–1974 and 1981–1982, four distances had to be skated: 500 m – 1,000 m – 1,500 m – 3,000 m (the mini combination).
- From 1983 to 2017, four distances had to be skated: 500 m – 1,500 m – 3,000 m – 5,000 m (the small combination).
- Starting in 2017, in odd years, a separate competition with four distances is held: 500 m – 1000 m – 500 m – 1000 m (the sprint combination).
- Starting in 2018, in even years, a single distance championships with seven events will be held: 500 m, 1000 m, 1500 m, 3000 m, team pursuit, mass start, and team sprint.

=== Ranking systems used ===
- Since 1970, the samalog system has been in use. However, the rule that a skater winning at least three distances was automatically European Champion remained in effect until (and including) 1986.

== Medal winners ==
Numbers in brackets denotes number of victories in corresponding disciplines. Boldface denotes record number of victories.

=== Allround championships ===
Year	Location	Gold	Silver	Bronze
1970	Heerenveen	(Soviet Union) Nina Statkevich	(Netherlands) Stien Kaiser	(Netherlands) Ans Schut
1971	Leningrad	(Soviet Union) Nina Statkevich (2)	(Soviet Union) Lyudmila Titova	(Soviet Union) Kapitolina Seregina
1972	Inzell	(Netherlands) Atje Keulen-Deelstra	(Soviet Union) Nina Statkevich	(Soviet Union) Lyudmila Savrulina
1973	Brandbu	(Netherlands) Atje Keulen-Deelstra	(Netherlands) Trijnie Rep	(Soviet Union) Nina Statkevich
1974	Alma-Ata	(Netherlands) Atje Keulen-Deelstra (3)	(Soviet Union) Nina Statkevich	(Soviet Union) Tatyana Shelekhova
1975	Not held due to lack of interest			
1976	Not held due to lack of interest			
1977	Not held due to lack of interest			
1978	Not held due to lack of interest			
1979	Not held due to lack of interest			
1980	Not held due to lack of interest			
1981	Heerenveen	(Soviet Union) Natalya Petrusyova	(East Germany) Karin Enke	(East Germany) Gabi Schönbrunn
1982	Heerenveen	(Soviet Union) Natalya Petrusyova (2)	(East Germany) Karin Busch	(Soviet Union) Natalya Glebova
1983	Heerenveen	(East Germany) Andrea Schöne	(East Germany) Karin Enke	(Soviet Union) Natalya Petrusyova
1984	Alma-Ata	(East Germany) Gabi Schönbrunn	(Soviet Union) Valentina Lalenkova	(Soviet Union) Olga Pleshkova
1985	Groningen	(East Germany) Andrea Schöne	(Netherlands) Yvonne van Gennip	(East Germany) Sabine Brehm
1986	Geithus	(East Germany) Andrea Ehrig	(Netherlands) Yvonne van Gennip	(Soviet Union) Natalya Artamonova
1987	Groningen	(East Germany) Andrea Ehrig	(Netherlands) Yvonne van Gennip	(East Germany) Jacqueline Börner
1988	Kongsberg	(East Germany) Andrea Ehrig (5)	(East Germany) Gunda Kleemann	(Netherlands) Yvonne van Gennip
1989	West Berlin	(East Germany) Gunda Kleemann	(East Germany) Constanze Moser	(East Germany) Jacqueline Börner
1990	Heerenveen	(East Germany) Gunda Kleemann	(East Germany) Jacqueline Börner	(East Germany) Heike Schalling
1991	Sarajevo	(Germany) Gunda Kleemann	(Germany) Heike Warnicke	(Netherlands) Yvonne van Gennip
1992	Heerenveen	(Germany) Gunda Niemann	(Austria) Emese Hunyady	(Germany) Heike Warnicke
1993	Heerenveen	(Austria) Emese Hunyady	(Germany) Heike Warnicke	(Russia) Svetlana Bazhanova
1994	Hamar	(Germany) Gunda Niemann	(Russia) Svetlana Bazhanova	(Austria) Emese Hunyady
1995	Heerenveen	(Germany) Gunda Niemann	(Netherlands) Annamarie Thomas	(Netherlands) Tonny de Jong
1996	Heerenveen	(Germany) Gunda Niemann	(Netherlands) Annamarie Thomas	(Germany) Claudia Pechstein
1997	Heerenveen	(Netherlands) Tonny de Jong	(Germany) Gunda Niemann	(Netherlands) Barbara de Loor
1998	Helsinki	(Germany) Claudia Pechstein	(Germany) Anni Friesinger	(Russia) Svetlana Bazhanova
1999	Heerenveen	(Netherlands) Tonny de Jong (2)	(Germany) Claudia Pechstein	(Netherlands) Annamarie Thomas
2000	Hamar	(Germany) Anni Friesinger	(Germany) Gunda Niemann-Stirnemann	(Netherlands) Renate Groenewold
2001	Baselga di Pinè	(Germany) Gunda Niemann-Stirnemann **(8)**	(Germany) Claudia Pechstein	(Netherlands) Wieteke Cramer
2002	Erfurt	(Germany) Anni Friesinger	(Germany) Claudia Pechstein	(Netherlands) Renate Groenewold
2003	Heerenveen	(Germany) Anni Friesinger	(Germany) Claudia Pechstein	(Netherlands) Renate Groenewold
2004	Heerenveen	(Germany) Anni Friesinger	(Germany) Claudia Pechstein	(Netherlands) Renate Groenewold
2005	Heerenveen	(Germany) Anni Friesinger (5)	(Germany) Daniela Anschütz	(Germany) Claudia Pechstein
2006	Hamar	(Germany) Claudia Pechstein	(Netherlands) Renate Groenewold	(Netherlands) Ireen Wüst
2007	Collalbo	(Czech Republic) Martina Sáblíková	(Netherlands) Ireen Wüst	(Netherlands) Renate Groenewold
2008	Kolomna	(Netherlands) Ireen Wüst	(Netherlands) Paulien van Deutekom	(Czech Republic) Martina Sáblíková
2009	Heerenveen	(Germany) Claudia Pechstein (3)	(Germany) Daniela Anschütz-Thoms	(Czech Republic) Martina Sáblíková
2010	Hamar	(Czech Republic) Martina Sáblíková	(Netherlands) Ireen Wüst	(Germany) Daniela Anschütz-Thoms
2011	Collalbo	(Czech Republic) Martina Sáblíková	(Netherlands) Ireen Wüst	(Netherlands) Marrit Leenstra
2012	Budapest	(Czech Republic) Martina Sáblíková	(Germany) Claudia Pechstein	(Netherlands) Ireen Wüst
2013	Heerenveen	(Netherlands) Ireen Wüst	(Netherlands) Linda de Vries	(Netherlands) Diane Valkenburg
2014	Hamar	(Netherlands) Ireen Wüst	(Netherlands) Yvonne Nauta	(Czech Republic) Martina Sáblíková
2015	Chelyabinsk	(Netherlands) Ireen Wüst	(Czech Republic) Martina Sáblíková	(Netherlands) Linda de Vries
2016	Minsk	(Czech Republic) Martina Sáblíková (5)	(Netherlands) Ireen Wüst	(Netherlands) Antoinette de Jong
2017	Heerenveen	(Netherlands) Ireen Wüst (5)	(Czech Republic) Martina Sáblíková	(Netherlands) Antoinette de Jong
2019	Collalbo	(Netherlands) Antoinette de Jong	(Czech Republic) Martina Sáblíková	(Italy) Francesca Lollobrigida
2021	Heerenveen	(Netherlands) Antoinette de Jong	(Netherlands) Irene Schouten	(Czech Republic) Martina Sáblíková
2023	Hamar	(Netherlands) Antoinette Rijpma-de Jong	(Norway) Ragne Wiklund	(Netherlands) Marijke Groenewoud
2025	Heerenveen	(Netherlands) Antoinette Rijpma-de Jong (4)	(Netherlands) Joy Beune	(Norway) Ragne Wiklund

=== Sprint championships ===
Year	Location	Gold	Silver	Bronze
2017	Heerenveen	(Czech Republic) Karolína Erbanová	(Netherlands) Jorien ter Mors	(Russia) Olga Fatkulina
2019	Collalbo	(Austria) Vanessa Herzog	(Russia) Daria Kachanova	(Russia) Olga Fatkulina
2021	Heerenveen	(Netherlands) Jutta Leerdam	(Russia) Angelina Golikova	(Netherlands) Femke Kok
2023	Hamar	(Netherlands) Jutta Leerdam	(Netherlands) Femke Kok	(Austria) Vanessa Herzog
2025	Heerenveen	(Netherlands) Jutta Leerdam **(3)**	(Netherlands) Femke Kok	(Netherlands) Suzanne Schulting

=== 500 metres ===
Year	Location	Gold	Silver	Bronze
2018	Kolomna	(Austria) Vanessa Herzog	(Russia) Angelina Golikova	(Czech Republic) Karolína Erbanová
2020	Heerenveen	(Russia) Olga Fatkulina	(Austria) Vanessa Herzog	(Russia) Angelina Golikova
2022	Heerenveen	(Netherlands) Femke Kok	(Russia) Angelina Golikova	(Russia) Daria Kachanova
2024	Heerenveen	(Netherlands) Femke Kok **(2)**	(Netherlands) Jutta Leerdam	(Austria) Vanessa Herzog
2026	Tomaszów Mazowiecki	(Poland) Kaja Ziomek-Nogal	(Poland) Andżelika Wójcik	(Netherlands) Isabel Grevelt

=== 1000 metres ===
Year	Location	Gold	Silver	Bronze
2018	Kolomna	(Russia) Yekaterina Shikhova	(Austria) Vanessa Herzog	(Netherlands) Marrit Leenstra
2020	Heerenveen	(Netherlands) Jutta Leerdam	(Russia) Daria Kachanova	(Russia) Yekaterina Shikhova
2022	Heerenveen	(Netherlands) Jutta Leerdam	(Netherlands) Femke Kok	(Russia) Daria Kachanova
2024	Heerenveen	(Netherlands) Jutta Leerdam **(3)**	(Netherlands) Antoinette Rijpma-de Jong	(Austria) Vanessa Herzog
2026	Tomaszów Mazowiecki	(Czech Republic) Nikola Zdráhalová	(Netherlands) Chloé Hoogendoorn	(Netherlands) Isabel Grevelt

=== 1500 metres ===
Year	Location	Gold	Silver	Bronze
2018	Kolomna	(Netherlands) Lotte van Beek	(Russia) Yekaterina Shikhova	(Netherlands) Marrit Leenstra
2020	Heerenveen	(Netherlands) Ireen Wüst	(Russia) Evgeniia Lalenkova	(Russia) Yekaterina Shikhova
2022	Heerenveen	(Netherlands) Antoinette de Jong	(Netherlands) Ireen Wüst	(Italy) Francesca Lollobrigida
2024	Heerenveen	(Netherlands) Antoinette Rijpma-de Jong **(2)**	(Netherlands) Marijke Groenewoud	(Netherlands) Joy Beune
2026	Tomaszów Mazowiecki	(Norway) Ragne Wiklund	(Czech Republic) Nikola Zdráhalová	(Netherlands) Chloé Hoogendoorn

=== 3000 metres ===
Year	Location	Gold	Silver	Bronze
2018	Kolomna	(Netherlands) Esmee Visser	(Netherlands) Carlijn Achtereekte	(Russia) Natalya Voronina
2020	Heerenveen	(Netherlands) Esmee Visser **(2)**	(Russia) Natalya Voronina	(Italy) Francesca Lollobrigida
2022	Heerenveen	(Netherlands) Irene Schouten	(Netherlands) Antoinette de Jong	(Italy) Francesca Lollobrigida
2024	Heerenveen	(Netherlands) Marijke Groenewoud	(Netherlands) Irene Schouten	(Norway) Ragne Wiklund
2026	Tomaszów Mazowiecki	(Norway) Ragne Wiklund	(Belgium) Sandrine Tas	(Netherlands) Sanne in 't Hof

=== Mass start ===
Year	Location	Gold	Silver	Bronze
2018	Kolomna	(Italy) Francesca Lollobrigida	(Italy) Francesca Bettrone	(Austria) Vanessa Herzog
2020	Heerenveen	(Netherlands) Irene Schouten	(Italy) Francesca Lollobrigida	(Netherlands) Melissa Wijfje
2022	Heerenveen	(Netherlands) Irene Schouten **(2)**	(Netherlands) Marijke Groenewoud	(Russia) Elizaveta Golubeva
2024	Heerenveen	(Netherlands) Marijke Groenewoud	(Netherlands) Irene Schouten	(Italy) Francesca Lollobrigida
2026	Tomaszów Mazowiecki	(Denmark) Sofia Thorup	(Italy) Francesca Lollobrigida	(Belgium) Fran Vanhoutte

=== Team pursuit ===
Year	Location	Gold	Silver	Bronze
2018	Kolomna	Netherlands; Marrit Leenstra; Lotte van Beek; Melissa Wijfje	Russia; Olga Graf; Yekaterina Shikhova; Natalya Voronina	Germany; Roxanne Dufter; Gabriele Hirschbichler; Michelle Uhrig
2020	Heerenveen	Netherlands; Antoinette de Jong; Melissa Wijfje **(2)**; Ireen Wüst	Russia; Elizaveta Kazelina; Evgeniia Lalenkova; Natalya Voronina	Belarus; Tatsiana Mikhailava; Yauheniya Varabyova; Maryna Zuyeva
2022	Heerenveen	Netherlands; Antoinette de Jong **(2)**; Irene Schouten; Ireen Wüst **(2)**	Norway; Marit Fjellanger Bøhm; Sofie Karoline Haugen; Ragne Wiklund	Russia; Elizaveta Golubeva; Evgeniia Lalenkova; Natalya Voronina
2024	Heerenveen	Netherlands; Joy Beune; Marijke Groenewoud; Irene Schouten **(2)**	Germany; Josie Hofmann; Josephine Schlörb; Lea Sophie Scholz	Switzerland; Jasmin Güntert; Ramona Härdi; Kaitlyn McGregor
2026	Tomaszów Mazowiecki	Netherlands; Sanne in 't Hof; Kim Talsma; Evelien Vijn	Belgium; Sandrine Tas; Isabelle van Elst; Fran Vanhoutte	Poland; Zofia Braun; Magdalena Czyszczoń; Natalia Jabrzyk

=== Team sprint ===
Year	Location	Gold	Silver	Bronze
2018	Kolomna	Russia; Angelina Golikova; Olga Fatkulina; Elizaveta Kazelina	Netherlands; Mayon Kuipers; Sanneke de Neeling; Letitia de Jong	Norway; Martine Ripsrud; Anne Gulbrandsen; Sofie Karoline Haugen
2020	Heerenveen	Russia; Angelina Golikova **(2)**; Olga Fatkulina **(2)**; Daria Kachanova	Netherlands; Femke Kok; Letitia de Jong; Ireen Wüst	Poland; Andżelika Wójcik; Kaja Ziomek; Natalia Czerwonka
2022	Heerenveen	Poland; Andżelika Wójcik; Kaja Ziomek; Karolina Bosiek	Belarus; Yauheniya Varabyova; Hanna Nifantava; Ekaterina Sloeva	Norway; Julie Nistad Samsonsen; Martine Ripsrud; Ane By Farstad
2024	Heerenveen	Netherlands; Marrit Fledderus; Femke Kok; Antoinette Rijpma-de Jong	Poland; Andżelika Wójcik; Iga Wojtasik; Karolina Bosiek	Norway; Carina Jagtøyen; Julie Nistad Samsonsen; Martine Ripsrud
2026	Tomaszów Mazowiecki	Poland; Martyna Baran; Kaja Ziomek-Nogal **(2)**; Karolina Bosiek **(2)**	Belgium; Fran Vanhoutte; Isabelle van Elst; Sandrine Tas	Germany; Katja Franzen; Anna Ostlender; Isabel Kraus

== All-time medal count ==
=== Allround and Sprint Championships (1970–2025) ===
Rank	Nation	Gold	Silver	Bronze	Total
1	Netherlands	17	20	22	59
2	Germany	14	13	4	31
3	East Germany	8	6	5	19
4	Czech Republic	6	3	4	13
5	Soviet Union	4	4	8	16
6	Austria	2	1	2	5
7	Russia	0	3	4	7
8	Norway	0	1	1	2
9	Italy	0	0	1	1
Totals (9 entries)		51	51	51	153

=== Single Distance Championships (2018–2026) ===
Rank	Nation	Gold	Silver	Bronze	Total
1	Netherlands	22	13	8	43
2	Russia	4	8	8	20
3	Poland	3	2	2	7
4	Norway	2	1	4	7
5	Italy	1	3	4	8
6	Austria	1	2	3	6
7	Czech Republic	1	1	1	3
8	Denmark	1	0	0	1
9	Belgium	0	3	1	4
10	Germany	0	1	2	3
11	Belarus	0	1	1	2
12	Switzerland	0	0	1	1
Totals (12 entries)		35	35	35	105

=== Combined all-time medal count (1970–2026) ===
Rank	Nation	Gold	Silver	Bronze	Total
1	Netherlands	39	33	30	102
2	Germany	14	14	6	34
3	East Germany	8	6	5	19
4	Czech Republic	7	4	5	16
5	Russia	4	11	12	27
6	Soviet Union	4	4	8	16
7	Austria	3	3	5	11
8	Poland	3	2	2	7
9	Norway	2	2	5	9
10	Italy	1	3	5	9
11	Denmark	1	0	0	1
12	Belgium	0	3	1	4
13	Belarus	0	1	1	2
14	Switzerland	0	0	1	1
Totals (14 entries)		86	86	86	258

== Multiple medalists ==
Boldface denotes active skaters and highest medal count among all skaters (including these who not included in these tables) per type.

=== Allround and Sprint Championships ===
Rank	Skater	Country	From	To	Gold	Silver	Bronze	Total
1	Gunda Niemann-Stirnemann (Kleemann)	East Germany; Germany	1988	2001	**8**	3	–	11
2	Ireen Wüst	Netherlands	2006	2017	5	4	2	11
3	Martina Sáblíková	Czech Republic	2007	2021	5	3	4	**12**
4	Anni Friesinger	Germany	1998	2005	5	1	–	6
5	Andrea Ehrig (Schöne)	East Germany	1983	1988	5	–	–	5
6	**Antoinette Rijpma-de Jong**	Netherlands	2016	2025	4	–	2	6
7	Claudia Pechstein	Germany	1996	2012	3	**6**	2	11
8	Atje Keulen-Deelstra	Netherlands	1972	1974	3	–	–	3
8	**Jutta Leerdam**	Netherlands	2021	2025	3	–	–	3
10	Nina Statkevich	Soviet Union	1970	1974	2	2	1	5

=== All events ===
Rank	Skater	Country	From	To	Gold	Silver	Bronze	Total
1	**Antoinette Rijpma-de Jong**	Netherlands	2016	2025	**9**	2	2	13
2	Ireen Wüst	Netherlands	2006	2022	8	**6**	2	**16**
3	Gunda Niemann-Stirnemann (Kleemann)	East Germany; Germany	1988	2001	8	3	–	11
4	**Jutta Leerdam**	Netherlands	2020	2025	6	1	–	7
5	Martina Sáblíková	Czech Republic	2007	2021	5	3	4	12
6	Irene Schouten	Netherlands	2020	2024	5	3	–	8
7	Anni Friesinger	Germany	1998	2005	5	1	–	6
8	Andrea Ehrig (Schöne)	East Germany	1983	1988	5	–	–	5
9	Claudia Pechstein	Germany	1996	2012	3	**6**	2	11
10	**Femke Kok**	Netherlands	2020	2025	3	4	1	8

== See also ==
- European Speed Skating Championships for Men
- World Allround Speed Skating Championships for Women
