= 2023 World Single Distances Speed Skating Championships – Women's mass start =

Women's mass start at the 2023 World Single Distances Speed Skating Championships
- Venue: Thialf
- Location: Heerenveen, Netherlands
- Date: 4 March
- Competitors: 24 from 15 nations
- Winning points: 66

Medalists
gold medal	Marijke Groenewoud	Netherlands
silver medal	Ivanie Blondin	Canada
bronze medal	Irene Schouten	Netherlands

The Women's mass start competition at the 2023 World Single Distances Speed Skating Championships was held on 4 March 2023.

== Results ==
=== Semi-finals ===
The first eight racers from each semifinal advanced to the final.

==== Semi-final 1 ====
The race was started at 14:22.

Rank	Name	Country	Points	Time	Notes
1	Sumire Kikuchi	Japan	60	9:16.54	Q
2	Mia Kilburg	United States	40	9:16.78	Q
3	Hwang Hyun-sun	South Korea	21	9:16.80	Q
4	Ivanie Blondin	Canada	11	9:16.91	Q
5	Yang Binyu	China	10	9:16.89	Q
6	Irene Schouten	Netherlands	6	9:16.97	Q
7	Sandrine Tas	Belgium	5	9:25.28	Q
8	Magdalena Czyszczoń	Poland	4	9:18.73	Q
9	Claudia Pechstein	Germany	0	9:19.45	
10	Gemma Cooper	Great Britain	0	9:22.46	
11	Abigél Mercs	Hungary	0	9:36.89	
12	Kaitlyn McGregor	Switzerland	0	9:38.12	

==== Semi-final 2 ====
The race was started at 14:40.

Rank	Name	Country	Points	Time	Notes
1	Marijke Groenewoud	Netherlands	63	9:07.90	Q
2	Laura Peveri	Italy	42	9:08.26	Q
3	Michelle Uhrig	Germany	21	9:08.52	Q
4	Valérie Maltais	Canada	10	9:08.58	Q
5	Park Ji-woo	South Korea	6	9:08.81	Q
6	Karolina Bosiek	Poland	6	9:09.70	Q
7	Chen Aoyu	China	3	9:08.92	Q
8	Ramona Härdi	Switzerland	3	9:09.60	Q
9	Sofie Karoline Haugen	Norway	3	9:09.97	
10	Giorgia Birkeland	United States	0	9:09.07	
11	Yuna Onodera	Japan	0	9:09.21	
12	Zuzana Kuršová	Czech Republic	0	9:13.17	

=== Final ===
The final was started at 17:19.

Rank	Name	Country	Points	Time
1st place, gold medalist(s)	Marijke Groenewoud	Netherlands	66	8:19.36
2nd place, silver medalist(s)	Ivanie Blondin	Canada	40	8:34.19
3rd place, bronze medalist(s)	Irene Schouten	Netherlands	22	8:34.37
4	Mia Kilburg	United States	10	8:34.67
5	Laura Peveri	Italy	6	8:34.78
6	Sandrine Tas	Belgium	4	8:45.38
7	Yang Binyu	China	3	8:34.91
8	Valérie Maltais	Canada	3	8:36.07
9	Ramona Härdi	Switzerland	2	8:40.93
10	Magdalena Czyszczoń	Poland	1	8:37.35
11	Karolina Bosiek	Poland	0	8:35.43
12	Sumire Kikuchi	Japan	0	8:35.93
13	Hwang Hyun-sun	South Korea	0	8:36.25
14	Michelle Uhrig	Germany	0	8:36.81
15	Chen Aoyu	China	0	8:39.04
16	Park Ji-woo	South Korea	0	8:41.76
