= 2024 European Speed Skating Championships – Women's 1500 metres =

Women's 1500 metres at the 2024 European Speed Skating Championships
- Venue: Thialf
- Location: Heerenveen, Netherlands
- Dates: 6 January
- Competitors: 19 from 8 nations
- Winning time: 1:53.48

Medalists
gold medal	Antoinette Rijpma-de Jong	Netherlands
silver medal	Marijke Groenewoud	Netherlands
bronze medal	Joy Beune	Netherlands

The women's 1500 metres competition at the 2024 European Speed Skating Championships was held on 6 January 2024.

== Results ==
The race was started at 17:03.

Rank	Pair	Lane	Name	Country	Time	Diff
1st place, gold medalist(s)	9	o	Antoinette Rijpma-de Jong	Netherlands	1:53.48	
2nd place, silver medalist(s)	9	i	Marijke Groenewoud	Netherlands	1:53.66	+0.18
3rd place, bronze medalist(s)	8	i	Joy Beune	Netherlands	1:55.02	+1.54
4	7	i	Francesca Lollobrigida	Italy	1:55.54	+2.06
5	10	i	Kaitlyn McGregor	Switzerland	1:57.36	+3.88
6	10	o	Isabelle van Elst	Belgium	1:58.93	+5.45
7	7	o	Veronica Luciani	Italy	1:59.47	+5.99
8	2	o	Aurora Grinden Løvås	Norway	1:59.99	+6.51
9	8	o	Sandrine Tas	Belgium	2:00.05	+6.57
10	6	i	Lea Sophie Scholz	Germany	2:00.22	+6.74
11	2	i	Victoria Stirnemann	Germany	2:00.29	+6.81
12	6	o	Natalia Jabrzyk	Poland	2:00.39	+6.91
13	3	o	Magdalena Czyszczoń	Poland	2:00.64	+7.16
14	4	o	Ramona Härdi	Switzerland	2:01.00	+7.52
15	3	i	Sofie Karoline Haugen	Norway	2:01.49	+8.01
16	5	i	Iga Wojtasik	Poland	2:02.62	+9.14
17	4	i	Zuzana Kuršová	Czech Republic	2:03.92	+10.44
18	5	o	Josephine Schlörb	Germany	2:04.39	+10.91
19	1	i	Lucie Korvasová	Czech Republic	2:07.43	+13.95
