= Speed skating at the 2026 Winter Olympics – Women's mass start =

Women's mass start at the XXV Olympic Winter Games
- Speed skating
- Venue: Milano Speed Skating Stadium, Milan
- Date: 21 February 2026
- Competitors: 27 from 16 nations
- Winning points: 60

Medalists
1st place, gold medalist(s)		Marijke Groenewoud	Netherlands
2nd place, silver medalist(s)		Ivanie Blondin	Canada
3rd place, bronze medalist(s)		Mia Manganello	United States

The women's mass start competition in speed skating at the 2026 Winter Olympics was held on 21 February, at the Milano Speed Skating Stadium in Milan. Marijke Groenewoud of the Netherlands won the event, which was her first individual Olympic medal. Ivanie Blondin of Canada won the silver medal, replicating her 2022 performance, and Mia Manganello of the United States won bronze, also her first individual Olympic medal.

== Background ==
The 2022 champion, Irene Schouten, retired. The silver medalist, Ivanie Blondin, and the bronze medalist, Francesca Lollobrigida, qualified for the event. Before the Olympics, Mia Manganello was leading the mass-start standings of the 2025–26 ISU Speed Skating World Cup, closely followed by Marijke Groenewoud, who was also the 2025 World champion in mass start.

== Results ==
=== Semifinals ===
Rank	Heat	Name	Country	Laps	Points					Time	Notes
Rank	Heat	Name	Country	Laps	S1	S2	S3	S4	Total	Time	Notes
1	1	Ayano Sato	Japan	16				60	60	8:36.33	Q
2	1	Yang Binyu	China	16	3			40	43	8:36.44	Q
3	1	Mia Manganello	United States	16		3		20	23	8:36.62	Q
4	1	Valérie Maltais	Canada	16	1			10	11	8:36.69	Q
5	1	Sandrine Tas	Belgium	16	2		1	6	9	8:37.28	Q
6	1	Jeannine Rosner	Austria	16			2	3	5	8:37.44	Q
7	1	Kaitlyn McGregor	Switzerland	16			3		3	8:40.11	Q
8	1	Bente Kerkhoff	Netherlands	16		2			2	8:37.46	Q
9	1	Maira Jasch	Germany	16		1			1	8:39.72	
10	1	Lim Lee-won	South Korea	16					0	8:39.27	
11	1	Maryna Zuyeva	Individual Neutral Athletes	16					0	8:39.63	
12	1	Aurora Grinden Løvås	Norway	16					0	8:43.15	
13	1	Natalia Czerwonka	Poland	16					0	8:52.93	
1	2	Marijke Groenewoud	Netherlands	16		2	2	60	64	8:43.59	Q
2	2	Francesca Lollobrigida	Italy	16	2		3	40	45	8:44.02	Q
3	2	Park Ji-woo	South Korea	16				20	20	8:44.22	Q
4	2	Fran Vanhoutte	Belgium	16				10	10	8:44.36	Q
5	2	Ramona Härdi	Switzerland	16				6	6	8:44.52	Q
6	2	Ivanie Blondin	Canada	16	3	1	1		5	8:46.50	Q
7	2	Elizaveta Golubeva	Kazakhstan	16				3	3	8:44.66	Q
8	2	Greta Myers	United States	16		3			3	8:48.84	Q
9	2	Anastasiia Semenova	Individual Neutral Athletes	16	1				1	8:45.91	
10	2	Ahenaer Adake	China	16					0	8:45.31	
11	2	Josie Hofmann	Germany	16					0	8:45.54	
12	2	Momoka Horikawa	Japan	16					0	8:46.79	
13	2	Anna Molnar	Austria	16					0	8:48.55	
14	2	Violette Braun	France	16					0	8:50.91	

=== Final ===
Rank	Name	Country	Laps	Points					Time
Rank	Name	Country	Laps	S1	S2	S3	S4	Total	Time
1st place, gold medalist(s)	Marijke Groenewoud	Netherlands	16				60	60	8:34.70
2nd place, silver medalist(s)	Ivanie Blondin	Canada	16				40	40	8:35.09
3rd place, bronze medalist(s)	Mia Manganello	United States	16				20	20	8:35.39
4	Francesca Lollobrigida	Italy	16				10	10	8:35.95
5	Valérie Maltais	Canada	16				6	6	8:36.10
6	Kaitlyn McGregor	Switzerland	16		3	2		5	8:47.96
7	Yang Binyu	China	16				3	3	8:36.16
8	Jeannine Rosner	Austria	16	3				3	8:36.68
9	Fran Vanhoutte	Belgium	16			3		3	8:58.71
10	Bente Kerkhoff	Netherlands	16	2		1		3	9:08.16
11	Ramona Härdi	Switzerland	16		2			2	8:53.52
12	Greta Myers	United States	16	1				1	8:37.14
13	Sandrine Tas	Belgium	16		1			1	8:47.72
14	Park Ji-woo	South Korea	16					0	8:36.31
15	Ayano Sato	Japan	16					0	8:36.58
16	Elizaveta Golubeva	Kazakhstan	16					0	8:38.07
