= 2024 European Speed Skating Championships – Women's mass start =

Women's mass start at the 2024 European Speed Skating Championships
- Venue: Thialf
- Location: Heerenveen, Netherlands
- Dates: 7 January
- Competitors: 16 from 9 nations
- Winning points: 66

Medalists
| gold medal | Marijke Groenewoud | Netherlands |
| silver medal | Irene Schouten | Netherlands |
| bronze medal | Francesca Lollobrigida | Italy |

The women's mass start competition at the 2024 European Speed Skating Championships was held on 7 January 2024.

== Results ==
The race was started at 17:06.

| Rank | Name | Country | Laps | Points | Time |
|---|---|---|---|---|---|
| 1st place, gold medalist(s) | Marijke Groenewoud | Netherlands | 16 | 66 | 8:08.51 |
| 2nd place, silver medalist(s) | Irene Schouten | Netherlands | 16 | 40 | 8:09.52 |
| 3rd place, bronze medalist(s) | Francesca Lollobrigida | Italy | 16 | 20 | 8:09.84 |
| 4 | Kaitlyn McGregor | Switzerland | 16 | 10 | 8:11.56 |
| 5 | Sandrine Tas | Belgium | 16 | 7 | 8:11.72 |
| 6 | Michelle Uhrig | Germany | 16 | 4 | 8:15.18 |
| 7 | Ramona Härdi | Switzerland | 16 | 4 | 8:28.52 |
| 8 | Fran Vanhoutte | Belgium | 16 | 3 | 8:11.75 |
| 9 | Magdalena Czyszczoń | Poland | 16 | 1 | 8:16.00 |
| 10 | Sofie Karoline Haugen | Norway | 16 | 0 | 8:13.25 |
| 11 | Josie Hofmann | Germany | 16 | 0 | 8:15.89 |
| 12 | Zuzana Kuršová | Czech Republic | 16 | 0 | 8:16.92 |
| 13 | Laura Lorenzato | Italy | 16 | 0 | 8:32.77 |
| 14 | Lucie Korvasová | Czech Republic | 13 | 0 | DNF |
| 15 | Olga Piotrowska | Poland | 12 | 0 | DNF |
| 16 | Anna Molnar | Austria | 9 | ~~2~~ 0 | DNF |
| — | Aurora Grinden Løvås | Norway | Did not start | | |
