= 2024 European Speed Skating Championships – Women's team pursuit =

Women's team pursuit at the 2024 European Speed Skating Championships
- Venue: Thialf
- Location: Heerenveen, Netherlands
- Dates: 7 January
- Competitors: 15 from 5 nations
- Teams: 5
- Winning time: 2:55.70

Medalists
gold medal	Joy Beune; Irene Schouten; Marijke Groenewoud	Netherlands
silver medal	Josephine Schlörb; Josie Hofmann; Lea Sophie Scholz	Germany
bronze medal	Jasmin Güntert; Kaitlyn McGregor; Ramona Härdi	Switzerland

The women's team pursuit competition at the 2024 European Speed Skating Championships was held on 7 January 2024.

== Results ==
The race was started at 14:15.

Rank	Pair	Lane	Country	Time	Diff
1st place, gold medalist(s)	1	s	Netherlands; Joy Beune; Irene Schouten; Marijke Groenewoud	2:55.70	
2nd place, silver medalist(s)	3	c	Germany; Josephine Schlörb; Josie Hofmann; Lea Sophie Scholz	3:02.33	+6.63
3rd place, bronze medalist(s)	3	s	Switzerland; Jasmin Güntert; Kaitlyn McGregor; Ramona Härdi	3:02.40	+6.70
4	2	c	Italy; Francesca Lollobrigida; Veronica Luciani; Laura Lorenzato	3:02.41	+6.71
5	2	s	Poland; Karolina Bosiek; Magdalena Czyszczoń; Natalia Jabrzyk	3:02.97	+7.27
