= 2024 World Single Distances Speed Skating Championships – Women's mass start =

Women's mass start at the 2024 World Single Distances Speed Skating Championships
- Venue: Olympic Oval
- Location: Calgary, Canada
- Dates: February 17
- Competitors: 24 from 13 nations

Medalists
gold medal	Irene Schouten	Netherlands
silver medal	Ivanie Blondin	Canada
bronze medal	Marijke Groenewoud	Netherlands

The Women's mass start competition at the 2024 World Single Distances Speed Skating Championships was held February 17, 2024.

== Results ==
=== Semi-finals ===
The first eight racers from each semifinal advanced to the final.

==== Semi-final 1 ====
The race was started at 12:30.

Rank	Name	Country	Points	Time	Notes
1	Marijke Groenewoud	Netherlands	61	8:50.27	
2	Mia Manganello	United States	41	8:50.47	
3	Yang Binyu	China	20	8:50.48	
4	Sumire Kikuchi	Japan	10	8:50.65	
5	Laura Peveri	Italy	9	8:51.07	
6	Valerie Maltais	Canada	8	8:51.34	
7	Sofie Karoline Haugen	Norway	3	8:55.05	
8	Sandrine Tas	Belgium	2	8:52.51	
9	Michelle Uhrig	Germany	2	8:55.76	
10	Kaitlyn McGregor	Switzerland	1	8:52.78	
11	Lucie Korvasová	Czech Republic		8:54.13	
12	Olga Piotrowska	Poland		8:15.77	

==== Semi-final 2 ====
The race was started at 12:50.

Rank	Name	Country	Points	Time	Notes
1	Ivanie Blondin	Canada	64	8:58.13	
2	Irene Schouten	Netherlands	46	8:58.15	
3	Park Ji-woo	South Korea	20	8:58.31	
4	Jin Wenjing	China	11	8:58.34	
5	Yuka Takahashi	Japan	6	8:58.44	
6	Ramona Härdi	Switzerland	5	8:58.69	
7	Laura Lorenzato	Italy	3	8:58.94	
8	Fran Vanhoutte	Belgium	2	9:01.65	
9	Giorgia Birkeland	United States		8:59.67	
10	Josephine Heimerl	Germany		9:00.49	
11	Zuzana Kuršová	Czech Republic		9:01.83	
12	Magdalena Czyszczoń	Poland		9:24.71	

=== Final ===
The final was started at 15:44.

Rank	Name	Country	Points	Time
1st place, gold medalist(s)	Irene Schouten	Netherlands	60	8:23.71
2nd place, silver medalist(s)	Ivanie Blondin	Canada	42	8:23.81
3rd place, bronze medalist(s)	Marijke Groenewoud	Netherlands	21	8:24.01
4	Yang Binyu	China	10	8:24.06
5	Laura Peveri	Italy	6	8:24.37
6	Laura Lorenzato	Italy	6	8:44.23
7	Ramona Härdi	Switzerland	4	8:28.94
8	Mia Manganello	United States	3	8:24.56
9	Sandrine Tas	Belgium	3	8:25.32
10	Yuka Takahashi	Japan	1	8:26.53
11	Park Ji-woo	South Korea	1	8:32.15
12	Fran Vanhoutte	Belgium		8:26.20
13	Sumire Kikuchi	Japan		8:26.26
14	Jin Wenjing	China		8:36.13
15	Sofie Karoline Haugen	Norway		8:36.85
16	Valerie Maltais	Canada		8:54.02
