= Speed skating at the 2022 Winter Olympics – Women's mass start =

Speed skating event at the 2022 Winter Olympics

Women's mass start at the XXIV Olympic Winter Games
- Speed skating
- Venue: National Speed Skating Oval, Beijing
- Date: 19 February 2022
- Competitors: 28 from 17 nations
- Winning points: 60

Medalists
1st place, gold medalist(s)		Irene Schouten	Netherlands
2nd place, silver medalist(s)		Ivanie Blondin	Canada
3rd place, bronze medalist(s)		Francesca Lollobrigida	Italy

The women's mass start competition in speed skating at the 2022 Winter Olympics was held on 19 February, at the National Speed Skating Oval ("Ice Ribbon") in Beijing. Irene Schouten of the Netherlands won the event, her third gold and fourth overall medal at these Olympics. Ivanie Blondin of Canada won her first individual Olympic medal, the silver. Francesca Lollobrigida of Italy won the bronze medal.

The defending champion was Nana Takagi. She entered the competition, fell in her semifinal, and did not qualify to the final. The silver medalist, Kim Bo-reum, and the bronze medalist, Schouten, qualified for the Olympics as well. Marijke Groenewoud was the 2021 World Single Distances champion in mass start, with Blondin and Schouten being the silver and bronze medalists, respectively. Blondin was leading the 2021–22 ISU Speed Skating World Cup in mass start with three events completed before the Olympics, followed by Lollobrigida, Guo Dan, and Elizaveta Golubeva.

== Qualification ==
A total of 24 entry quotas were available for the event, with a maximum of two athletes per NOC. All 24 athletes qualified through their performance at the 2021–22 ISU Speed Skating World Cup.

The qualification time for the event (2:10.00 (1500 m)) was released on July 1, 2021, and was unchanged from 2018. Skaters had the time period of July 1, 2021 – January 16, 2022 to achieve qualification times at valid International Skating Union (ISU) events.

== Results ==
=== Semifinals ===
Rank	Heat	Name	Country	Laps	Points					Time	Notes
Rank	Heat	Name	Country	Laps	S1	S2	S3	S4	Total	Time	Notes
1	1	Ivanie Blondin	Canada	16	2		3	60	65	8:28.68	Q
2	1	Ayano Sato	Japan	16				40	40	8:28.77	Q
3	1	Li Qishi	China	16	3			20	23	8:29.01	Q
4	1	Mia Kilburg	United States	16				10	10	8:29.93	Q
5	1	Marijke Groenewoud	Netherlands	16		3		6	9	8:30.92	Q
6	1	Magdalena Czyszczoń	Poland	16		2	2		4	8:31.77	Q
7	1	Claudia Pechstein	Germany	16				3	3	8:30.99	Q
8	1	Maryna Zuyeva	Belarus	16		1	1		2	8:31.54	Q
9	1	Elizaveta Golubeva	ROC	16	1				1	8:53.99	ADV
10	1	Nadja Wenger	Switzerland	16					0	8:31.50	
11	1	Laura Gómez	Colombia	16					0	8:31.66	
12	1	Sofie Karoline Haugen	Norway	16					0	8:33.77	
13	1	Park Ji-woo	South Korea	16					0	8:53.64	
14	1	María Victoria Rodríguez	Argentina	9					0	5:24.53	
1	2	Francesca Lollobrigida	Italy	16	2			60	62	8:34.19	Q
2	2	Kim Bo-reum	South Korea	16				40	40	8:34.23	Q
3	2	Guo Dan	China	16		1		20	21	8:34.39	Q
4	2	Irene Schouten	Netherlands	16	3			10	13	8:34.43	Q
5	2	Karolina Bosiek	Poland	16				6	6	8:34.442	Q
6	2	Giorgia Birkeland	United States	16				3	3	8:34.446	Q
7	2	Valérie Maltais	Canada	16		3			3	8:35.47	Q
8	2	Nadezhda Morozova	Kazakhstan	16			3		3	8:42.23	Q
9	2	Yauheniya Varabyova	Belarus	16			2		2	8:43.65	
10	2	Elena Sokhryakova	ROC	16	1		1		2	8:45.00	
11	2	Michelle Uhrig	Germany	16		2			2	9:02.52	
12	2	Sandrine Tas	Belgium	16					0	8:37.77	
13	2	Marit Fjellanger Bøhm	Norway	16					0	8:42.28	
14	2	Nana Takagi	Japan	16					0	9:10.03	
	2	Nikola Zdráhalová	Czech Republic	Did not start							

=== Final ===
Rank	Name	Country	Laps	Points					Time
Rank	Name	Country	Laps	S1	S2	S3	S4	Total	Time
1st place, gold medalist(s)	Irene Schouten	Netherlands	16				60	60	8:14.73
2nd place, silver medalist(s)	Ivanie Blondin	Canada	16				40	40	8:14.79
3rd place, bronze medalist(s)	Francesca Lollobrigida	Italy	16				20	20	8:14.98
4	Mia Kilburg	United States	16				10	10	8:16.15
5	Kim Bo-reum	South Korea	16				6	6	8:16.81
6	Valérie Maltais	Canada	16	3	3			6	8:20.46
7	Maryna Zuyeva	Belarus	16	2		2		4	8:20.10
8	Ayano Sato	Japan	16				3	3	8:16.94
9	Claudia Pechstein	Germany	16			3		3	8:25.78
10	Magdalena Czyszczoń	Poland	16	1		1		2	8:21.07
11	Marijke Groenewoud	Netherlands	16		1			1	9:12.86
12	Giorgia Birkeland	United States	16					0	8:18.10
13	Guo Dan	China	16					0	8:18.61
14	Nadezhda Morozova	Kazakhstan	16					0	8:21.05
15	Elizaveta Golubeva	ROC	15					0	7:50.24
	Karolina Bosiek	Poland						Disqualified	
	Li Qishi	China			2			Disqualified	
