= 2021 World Single Distances Speed Skating Championships – Women's mass start =

Women's mass start at the 2021 World Single Distances Speed Skating Championships
- Venue: Thialf
- Location: Heerenveen, Netherlands
- Date: 13 February
- Competitors: 22 from 12 nations
- Winning points: 60

Medalists
gold medal	Marijke Groenewoud	Netherlands
silver medal	Ivanie Blondin	Canada
bronze medal	Irene Schouten	Netherlands

The Women's mass start competition at the 2021 World Single Distances Speed Skating Championships was held on 13 February 2021.

== Results ==
=== Semifinals ===
The first eight racers from each semifinal advanced to the final.

==== Semifinal 1 ====
The race was started at 13:45.

Rank	Name	Country	Points	Time	Notes
1	Irene Schouten	Netherlands	64	8:38.020	Q
2	Francesca Lollobrigida	Italy	44	8:39.020	Q
3	Valérie Maltais	Canada	22	8:39.250	Q
4	Karolina Bosiek	Poland	16	8:39.960	Q
5	Elena Eranina	Russian Skating Union	7	8:40.040	Q
6	Maryna Zuyeva	Belarus	3	8:40.980	Q
7	Claudia Pechstein	Germany	1	8:41.120	Q
8	Nadja Wenger	Switzerland	0	8:41.600	Q
9	Sandrine Tas	Belgium	0	8:43.170	
10	Sofie Karoline Haugen	Norway	0	8:45.840	
11	Natalie Kerschbaummayr	Austria	0	9:15.080	

==== Semifinal 2 ====
The race was started at 14:04.

Rank	Name	Country	Points	Time	Notes
1	Marijke Groenewoud	Netherlands	60	8:57.140	Q
2	Ivanie Blondin	Canada	47	8:57.700	Q
3	Elizaveta Golubeva	Russian Skating Union	22	8:57.760	Q
4	Linda Rossi	Italy	15	8:58.380	Q
5	Mareike Thum	Germany	3	8:58.440	Q
6	Vera Güntert	Switzerland	6	8:58.670	Q
7	Tatsiana Mikhailava	Belarus	3	9:12.200	Q
8	Gemma Cooper	Great Britain	1	9:02.260	Q
9	Magdalena Czyszczoń	Poland	0	9:00.500	
10	Katharina Thien	Austria	0	9:00.790	
11	Marit Fjellanger Bøhm	Norway	0	9:01.070	

=== Final ===
The final was started at 16:58.

Rank	Name	Country	Points	Time
1st place, gold medalist(s)	Marijke Groenewoud	Netherlands	60	8:43.15
2nd place, silver medalist(s)	Ivanie Blondin	Canada	42	8:43.26
3rd place, bronze medalist(s)	Irene Schouten	Netherlands	20	8:43.56
4	Francesca Lollobrigida	Italy	14	8:43.86
5	Linda Rossi	Italy	8	8:45.10
6	Karolina Bosiek	Poland	3	8:45.28
7	Maryna Zuyeva	Belarus	3	8:47.42
8	Gemma Cooper	Great Britain	2	8:50.82
9	Claudia Pechstein	Germany	1	8:47.20
10	Tatsiana Mikhailava	Belarus	1	9:04.96
11	Vera Güntert	Switzerland	0	8:45.76
12	Nadja Wenger	Switzerland	0	8:49.75
13	Mareike Thum	Germany	0	8:50.60
14	Valérie Maltais	Canada	0	8:18.93
15	Elizaveta Golubeva	Russian Skating Union	0	7:40.77
16	Elena Eranina	Russian Skating Union	0	7:41.30
