= 2025 World Single Distances Speed Skating Championships – Women's mass start =

Women's mass start at the 2025 World Single Distances Speed Skating Championships
- Venue: Vikingskipet
- Location: Hamar, Norway
- Dates: 16 March
- Competitors: 24 from 14 nations
- Winning points: 60

Medalists
gold medal	Marijke Groenewoud	Netherlands
silver medal	Ivanie Blondin	Canada
bronze medal	Francesca Lollobrigida	Italy

The Women's mass start competition at the 2025 World Single Distances Speed Skating Championships took place on 16 March 2025.

== Results ==
The race was started at 15:58.

Rank	Name	Country	Points	Time
1st place, gold medalist(s)	Marijke Groenewoud	Netherlands	60	8:23.17
2nd place, silver medalist(s)	Ivanie Blondin	Canada	40	8:23.37
3rd place, bronze medalist(s)	Francesca Lollobrigida	Italy	20	8:23.58
4	Yang Binyu	China	10	8:23.97
5	Mia Manganello	United States	6	8:24.14
6	Kaitlyn McGregor	Switzerland	4	8:35.96
7	Ayano Sato	Japan	3	8:24.16
8	Valerie Maltais	Canada	3	8:24.99
9	Jin Wenjin	China	3	8:32.80
10	Fran Vanhoutte	Belgium	3	8:41.36
11	Ramona Härdi	Switzerland	2	8:30.00
12	Michelle Uhrig	Germany	2	8:53.82
13	Natalia Jabrzyk	Poland	1	8:32.14
14	Park Ji-woo	South Korea		8:24.94
15	Greta Myers	United States		8:27.30
16	Momoka Horikawa	Japan		8:27.52
17	Elise Dul	Netherlands		8:28.28
18	Sandrine Tas	Belgium		8:28.28
19	Aurora Grinden Løvås	Norway		8:28.78
20	Josine Hofmann	Germany		8:31.62
21	Zuzana Kuršová	Czech Republic		8:32.78
22	Alice Marletti	Italy		8:33.03
23	Violette Braun	France		7:59.65
24	Olga Piotrowska	Poland		7:55.38
