= 2022 European Speed Skating Championships – Women's 1500 metres =

Women's 1500 metres at the 2022 European Speed Skating Championships
- Venue: Thialf
- Location: Heerenveen, Netherlands
- Dates: 8 January
- Competitors: 19 from 10 nations
- Winning time: 1:53.81

Medalists
gold medal	Antoinette de Jong	Netherlands
silver medal	Ireen Wüst	Netherlands
bronze medal	Francesca Lollobrigida	Italy

The women's 1500 metres competition at the 2022 European Speed Skating Championships was held on 8 January 2022.

== Results ==
The final was started at 16:59.

Rank	Pair	Lane	Name	Country	Time	Diff
1st place, gold medalist(s)	10	i	Antoinette de Jong	Netherlands	1:53.81	
2nd place, silver medalist(s)	10	o	Ireen Wüst	Netherlands	1:54.08	+0.27
3rd place, bronze medalist(s)	9	i	Francesca Lollobrigida	Italy	1:54.50	+0.69
4	7	o	Marijke Groenewoud	Netherlands	1:54.78	+0.97
5	8	o	Ragne Wiklund	Norway	1:54.85	+1.04
6	8	i	Evgeniia Lalenkova	Russia	1:55.23	+1.42
7	9	o	Elizaveta Golubeva	Russia	1:55.63	+1.82
8	5	o	Ekaterina Sloeva	Belarus	1:57.58	+3.77
9	7	i	Ellia Smeding	Great Britain	1:59.23	+5.42
10	4	i	Anastasiia Grigoreva	Russia	1:59.511	+5.70
11	5	i	Leia Behlau	Germany	1:59.512	+5.70
12	3	o	Marit Fjellanger Bøhm	Norway	2:00.38	+6.57
13	6	o	Sofie Karoline Haugen	Norway	2:00.44	+6.63
14	4	o	Michelle Uhrig	Germany	2:00.81	+7.00
15	6	i	Kaitlyn McGregor	Switzerland	2:01.16	+7.35
16	2	i	Lea Sophie Scholz	Germany	2:01.33	+7.52
17	3	i	Zuzana Kuršová	Czech Republic	2:01.65	+7.84
18	2	o	Olga Kaczmarek	Poland	2:03.20	+9.39
19	1	i	Veronika Antošová	Czech Republic	2:05.66	+11.85
