= 2019 KNSB Dutch Single Distance Championships – Women's mass start =

Dutch speed skating competition

2019 KNSB Dutch Single Distance Championships – Women's Mass Start
- Venue: Thialf, Heerenveen
- Dates: 30 December 2018
- Competitors: 16 skaters

Medalist women
1st place, gold medalist(s)		Irene Schouten	NED
2nd place, silver medalist(s)		Marijke Groenewoud	NED
3rd place, bronze medalist(s)		Elisa Dul	NED

The women's Mass Start at the 2019 KNSB Dutch Single Distance Championships in Heerenveen took place at Thialf ice skating rink on Sunday 30 December 2018.

== Result ==
Rank	Skater	Rounds	sprint 1	sprint 2	sprint 3	sprint 4	Total points	Time
1st place, gold medalist(s)	Irene Schouten	16				60	60	8:42.88
2nd place, silver medalist(s)	Marijke Groenewoud	16	1	2	2	40	45	8:43.28
3rd place, bronze medalist(s)	Elisa Dul	16	3			20	23	8:44.69
4	Dieuwertje van Kalken	16			1	10	11	8:44.81
5	Melissa Wijfje	16	2	3	3	3	11	8:46.28
6	Imke Vormeer	16				6	6	8:45.72
7	Paulien Verhaar	16		1			1	8:51.10
8	Carien Kleibeuker	16					0	8:46.57
9	Hilde Noppert	16					0	8:46.79
10	Elsemieke van Maaren	16					0	8:50.65
11	Femke Markus	16					0	8:50.94
12	Nicky van Leeuwen	16					0	8:51.85
13	Jessica Merkens	16					0	10:07.91
14	Bianca Bakker	15					0	9:25.04
15	Bianca Roosenboom	15					0	9:06.04
16	Suzanne Schulting	15					0	9:10.42
DNS	Merel Bosma	0					0	DNS
