= 2020 KNSB Dutch Single Distance Championships – Women's mass start =

Dutch speed skating competition

2020 KNSB Dutch Single Distance Championships – Women's Mass Start
- Venue: Thialf, Heerenveen
- Dates: 29 December 2019
- Competitors: 31 skaters

Medalist women
1st place, gold medalist(s)		Irene Schouten	NED
2nd place, silver medalist(s)		Marijke Groenewoud	NED
3rd place, bronze medalist(s)		Suzanne Schulting	NED

The women's Mass Start at the 2020 KNSB Dutch Single Distance Championships in Heerenveen took place at Thialf ice skating rink on Sunday 29 December 2019.

== Result ==
Position	Skater	Rounds	Points	Time
1st place, gold medalist(s)	Irene Schouten	16	60	8:20.79
2nd place, silver medalist(s)	Marijke Groenewoud	16	40	8:20.92
3rd place, bronze medalist(s)	Suzanne Schulting	16	20	8:21.48
4	Melissa Wijfje	16	10	8:21.67
5	Manon Kamminga	16	6	8:22.05
6	Paulien Verhaar	16	6	8:37.22
7	Elisa Dul	16	3	8:22.82
8	Eline Jansen	16	3	8:30.46
9	Kelly Schouten	16	3	8:31.53
10	Hilde Noppert	16	3	8:32.00
11	Tjilde Bennis	16	1	8:29.82
12	Femke Kok	16	–	8:22.83
13	Jorien ter Mors	16	–	8:24.81
14	Carlijn Achtereekte	16	–	8:25.20
15	Laura van Ramshorst	16	–	8:25.87
16	Emma Engbers	16	–	8:26.08
17	Bianca Roosenboom	16	–	8:28.62
18	Beau Wagemaker	16	–	8:29.04
19	Nicky van Leeuwen	16	–	8:29.21
20	Merel Bosma	16	–	8:29.48
20	Sanne van der Schaar	16	–	8:29.48
22	Pien Keulstra	16	–	8:29.92
23	Sandra Dekker	16	–	8:30.46
24	Sanne in 't Hof	16	–	8:30.87
25	Dieuwertje van Kalken	16	–	8:31.84
26	Bente Kerkhoff	16	–	8:33.40
27	Isabelle van Elst	16	–	8:33.46
28	Anne Leltz	16	–	8:37.47
29	Myrte Sandu	16	–	8:37.73
30	Imke Vormeer	16	–	8:49.21
31	Freya Reitsma	+1 Round	–	
NC	Esther Kiel	DNS		
