= Olga Pleshkova =

Russian speed skater

Personal information
- Nationality: Russian
- Born: 9 May 1956 (age 68); Kirov, Russian SFSR, Soviet Union

Sport
- Sport: Speed skating

Olga Pleshkova (born 9 May 1956) is a Russian speed skater. She competed at the 1980 Winter Olympics and the 1984 Winter Olympics, representing the Soviet Union.
