= Marijke Groenewoud =

Dutch speed skater (born 1999)

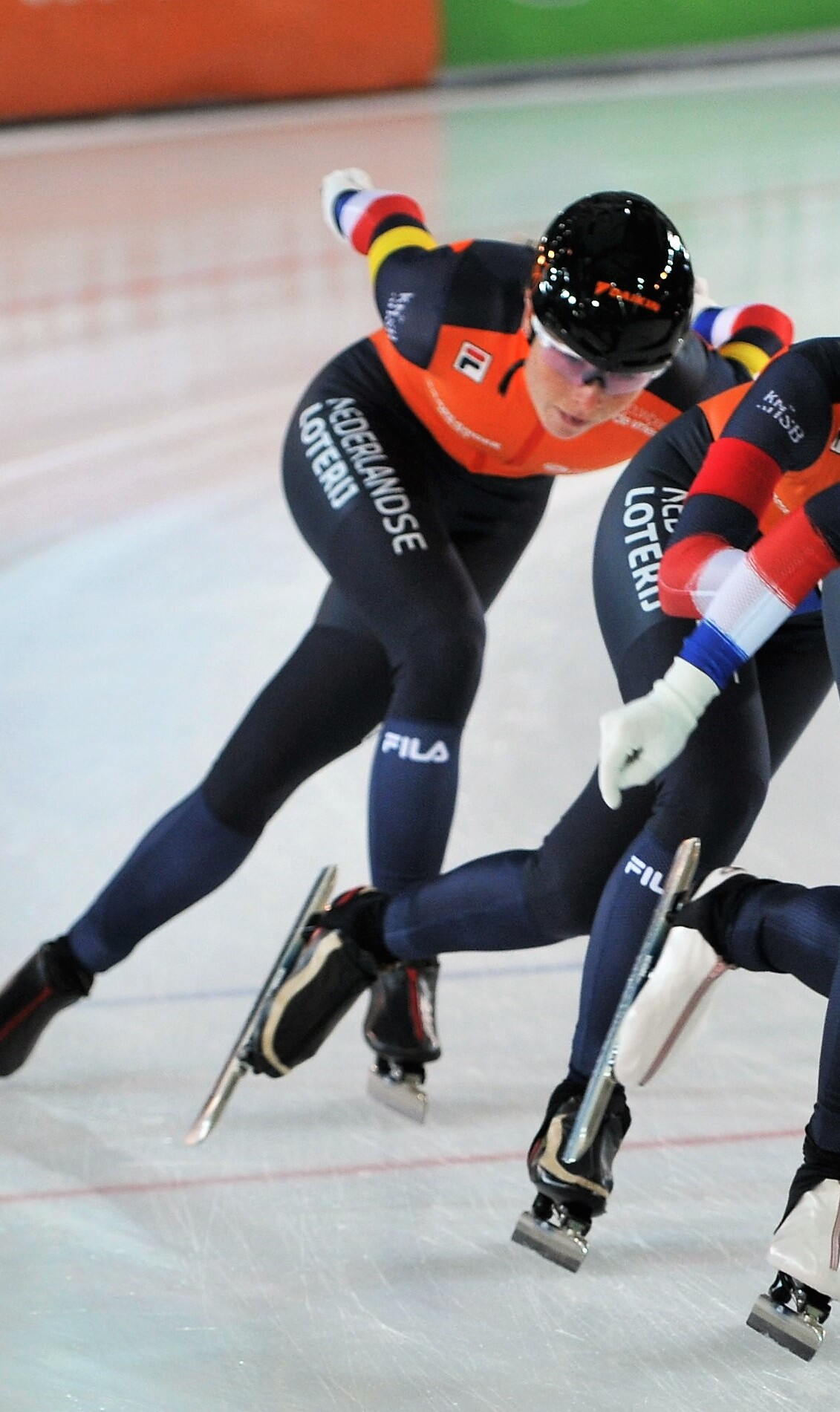

Personal information
- Born: 28 January 1999 (age 27) Hallum, Netherlands

Sport
- Country: Netherlands
- Sport: Speed skating
Medal record
Women's speed skating
Representing the Netherlands
Olympic Games
Gold medal – first place	2026 Milano Cortina	Mass start
Silver medal – second place	2026 Milano Cortina	Team pursuit
Bronze medal – third place	2022 Beijing	Team pursuit
World Single Distances Championships
Gold medal – first place	2021 Heerenveen	Mass start
Gold medal – first place	2023 Heerenveen	Mass start
Gold medal – first place	2024 Calgary	Team pursuit
Gold medal – first place	2025 Hamar	Team pursuit
Gold medal – first place	2025 Hamar	Mass start
Bronze medal – third place	2024 Calgary	Mass start
World Allround Championships
Silver medal – second place	2024 Inzell	Allround
Silver medal – second place	2026 Heerenveen	Allround
European Championships
Gold medal – first place	2024 Heerenveen	3000 m
Gold medal – first place	2024 Heerenveen	Mass start
Gold medal – first place	2024 Heerenveen	Team pursuit
Silver medal – second place	2024 Heerenveen	1500 m
Silver medal – second place	2022 Heerenveen	Mass start
Bronze medal – third place	2023 Hamar	Allround

Marijke Groenewoud (born 28 January 1999) is a Dutch long-distance long-track speed skater and inline speed skater. As a long-track speed skater she won a gold medal in the mass start and a silver medal in the team pursuit at the 2026 Winter Olympics, as well as a bronze medal in the team pursuit at the 2022 Winter Olympics. She was part of Team FrySk and of marathon team Royal A-ware. As of 2020 she is part of Team Zaanlander, trained by Jillert Anema.

== Career ==
Groenewoud is a marathon speed skater, winning the 2019–20 national marathon competition.

In long-track speed skating she made her international World Cup speed skating debut during the 2019–20 ISU Speed Skating World Cup in Nagano, Japan, on 13 December 2019 in the mass start. She was also selected for 2020–21 ISU Speed Skating World Cup.

At the Dutch Single Distance Championships she won the silver medal at the 2019 KNSB Dutch Single Distance Championships and 2020 KNSB Dutch Single Distance Championships in the mass start event.

== Records ==
=== Personal records ===
Personal records
Speed skating
Event	Result	Date	Location	Notes
500 m	38.57	27 December 2020	Thialf, Heerenveen	
1000 m	1:13.73	22 December 2023	Thialf, Heerenveen	
1500 m	1:53.05	29 December 2025	Thialf, Heerenveen	
3000 m	3:54.73	27 December 2025	Thialf, Heerenveen	
5000 m	6:44.59	2 November 2025	Thialf, Heerenveen	

== Tournament overview ==
Season	Dutch Championships Single Distances	Dutch Championships Allround	Dutch Championships Sprint	European Championships Single Distances	World Championships Single Distances	Olympic Games	World Cup	European Championships Allround
2018–19	HEERENVEEN 9th 1500m (silver) mass start							
2019–20	HEERENVEEN 8th 1000m (silver) mass start						29th mass start	
2020–21	HEERENVEEN 11th 500m 5th 1000m 5th 1500m	HEERENVEEN (bronze) 500m 9th 3000m 13th 1500m DNQ 5000m NC overall	HEERENVEEN 13th 500m 16th 1000m 12th 500m 8th 1000m 13th overall		HEERENVEEN (gold) mass start		28th 1000m 9th mass start	
2021–22	HEERENVEEN 10th 1000m 6th 1500m (silver) mass start			HEERENVEEN 4th 1500m (silver) mass start		BEIJING 5th 1500 m (bronze) team pursuit 12th mass start	29th 1500m 4th mass start	
2022–23	HEERENVEEN (silver) 1500m 4th 3000m (bronze) 5000m (silver) mass start	HEERENVEEN (silver) 500m (gold) 3000m (silver) 1500m (silver) 5000m (silver) overall			HEERENVEEN 5th 1500m (gold) mass start DQ team pursuit		6th 1500m 9th 3000m (silver) mass start	HAMAR (silver) 500m (bronze) 3000m (silver) 1500m (silver) 5000m (bronze) overall
2023–24	HEERENVEEN 9th 1000m (silver) 1500m (silver) 3000m 4th 5000m (silver) mass start			HEERENVEEN (silver) 1500m (gold) 3000m (gold) mass start (gold) team pursuit	CALGARY 8th 1500m (bronze) mass start (gold) team pursuit		6th 1500m 9th 3000m (silver) mass start	

== World Cup overview ==
Season	1500 meter					
2021–22	9th(b)	7th(b)	5th(b)	–	–	
2022–23	3rd place, bronze medalist(s)	3rd place, bronze medalist(s)	10th	10th	1st place, gold medalist(s)	–

Season	3000 meter					
2021–22						
2022–23	4th	6th	2nd place, silver medalist(s)	–	3rd place, bronze medalist(s)	–

Season	Mass start						
2021–22	1st(SF)	4th	1st(SF)	2nd place, silver medalist(s)	–	–	2nd place, silver medalist(s)
2022–23	2nd place, silver medalist(s)	2nd place, silver medalist(s)	3rd place, bronze medalist(s)	3rd place, bronze medalist(s)	1st place, gold medalist(s)	–	

- DNQ = Did not qualify
- DQ = Disqualified
- – = Did not participate
- (b) = Division B
- SF = Semi-Final
