= Sandrine Tas =

Belgian speed skater (born 1995)

Personal information
- Nationality: Belgian
- Born: 7 September 1995 (age 31) Ostend, Belgium
- Height: 1.71 m (5 ft 7 in)
- Weight: 62 kg (137 lb)

Sport
- Sport: Inline skating Speed skating
- Club: Zwaantjes Rollerclub Zandvoorde; Team Novus
Medal record
Representing Belgium
Women's speed skating
European Championships
Silver medal – second place	2026 Tomaszów Mazowiecki	3000 m
Silver medal – second place	2026 Tomaszów Mazowiecki	Team sprint
Silver medal – second place	2026 Tomaszów Mazowiecki	Team pursuit
Women's inline speed skating
World Games
Gold medal – first place	2017 Wrocław	Track 1000 m sprint
Silver medal – second place	2017 Wrocław	Road 10,000 m points race
Silver medal – second place	2017 Wrocław	Road 15,000 m elimination race
Silver medal – second place	2017 Wrocław	Road 10,000 m points race
Silver medal – second place	2017 Wrocław	Road 20,000 m elimination race
Bronze medal – third place	2017 Wrocław	Track 300 m time trial
World Championships
Gold medal – first place	2015 Kaohsiung	Track 1000 m sprint
Gold medal – first place	2015 Kaohsiung	Road marathon

Sandrine Tas
Cycling career
- Sport: Cycling
- Current team: AG Insurance–Soudal
- Discipline: Road bicycle racing
- Role: Rider

Amateur teams
- 2022: Lviv Cycling Team
- 2023-2025: Cyclingteam Belco / Van Eyck

Professional team
- 2026-: Lotto–Intermarché Ladies

Sandrine Tas (born 7 September 1995) is a Belgian inline skater, speed skater and cyclist. Tas grew up less than a kilometer away from the ZRC Skeeler Mundialtrack in Zandvoorde, Ostend, Belgium. She won multiple inline-skating European and world championship medals. As Inline-skating is not an Olympic sport, Tas followed in the footsteps of many an inline-skater, most notably Belgium's Olympic gold medal speed skater Bart Swings, and reinvented herself as a speed skater.

== Career ==
=== Inline speed skating ===
Tas quickly established herself as a force to be reckoned with, winning a.o. 4 titles at the 2014 junior Inline Speed Skating World Championships in Rosario, Argentina in November 2014. A year later already, in November 2015 she won her first World Champion titles, winning the women's track 1000 meters sprint and the marathon at the 2015 Inline Speed Skating World Championships in Kaohsiung, Chinese Taipei. Tas won six medals at the 2017 World Games in Wrocław, Poland punctuated by a gold medal in the Track Women's Sprint 1,000m. Between 2015 and 2019, Tas racked up no less than 17 European titles on the inline skating circuit.

=== Speed skating ===
Aiming to become an Olympic athlete, Tas switched from inline skating to speed skating in 2018 at age 23. Focusing initially on the shorter speed skating distances, Tas qualified for the 2022 Winter Olympics in Beijing, China and participated in the women's 500 metres, 1000 metres, 1500 metres, and mass start with a 24th place in that last event as her best result. After those Olympics, Tas switched to the longer speed skating distances and qualified for the women's 3000 metres, 5000 metres and mass start at the 2026 Winter Olympics in Milan and Cortina d'Ampezzo, Italy. In the runup to those 2026 Winter Olympics, Tas won two silver medals at the 2026 European Speed Skating Championships, one at the 3000m event and another at the team sprint.

=== Road cycling ===
Tas is also good on a bike. In June 2024 she won Belgium's national road time trial title for elite riders without a contract, in 2025 she finished 8th in Belgium's national road cycling championship race and later that year, in December 2025, she signed a contract with women's professional cycling team Lotto–Intermarché Ladies, based in Belgium.

== Personal life ==
Tas holds a degree of Master of Science in Bioscience Engineering: Food Science and Nutrition from Ghent University.

== Speed skating personal records ==
Personal records
Speed skating
Event	Result	Date	Location	Notes
500 m	38.66	10 December 2021	Olympic Oval, Calgary	
1000 m	1:16.46	11 December 2021	Olympic Oval, Calgary	
1500 m	1:56.12	15 November 2025	Utah Olympic Oval, Salt Lake City	
3000 m	3:59.42	21 November 2025	Olympic Oval, Calgary	Current Belgian record.
5000 m	6:46.47	12 February 2026	Fiera Milano, Milan	Current Belgian record.

She is currently in 68th position in the adelskalender with a points total of 155.499.

== Speed skating tournament summary ==
Season	European Championships Allround	European Championships Single Distances	World Championships Allround	World Championships Single Distances	World Cup	Olympic Games
2019–20		HEERENVEEN 5th team pursuit 18th mass start			54th 3000m/5000m	
2020–21				HEERENVEEN 19th 500m 24th 1500m 17th mass start	25th 500m 27th 1500m 27th 3000m/5000m 13th mass start	
2021–22		HEERENVEEN 15th 500m DNS mass start			41st 500m 52nd 1000m 55th 1500m 52nd 3000m/5000m 19th mass start	BEIJING 28th 500m 28th 1000m 29th 1500m 24th Mass start
2022–23	HAMAR 4th 500m WDR 3000m DNS 1500m DNS 5000m NC overall			HEERENVEEN 22nd 1500m 17th 3000m 6th Mass start	19th 1500m 32nd 3000m/5000m 8th mass start	
2023–24		HEERENVEEN 9th 1500m 11th 3000m 5th Mass start	INZELL 14th 500m 14th 3000m 14th 1500m DNS 5000m NC14 overall	CALGARY 22nd 1500m 20th 3000m 9th mass start	29th 1500m 28th 3000m/5000m 5th mass start	
2024–25	HAMAR 6th 500m 6th 3000m 8th 1500m 7th 5000m 6th overall			HAMAR 16th 3000m 10th 5000m 18th Mass start	31th 1500m 14th 3000m/5000m 16th mass start	
2025–26		TOMASZOW M. (silver) 3000m (silver) team pursuit (silver) team sprint				MILANO

== Major Cycling Results ==
2026
Bretagne Ladies Tour

1st Points Classification
1st Stages 1 & 3

2nd Time Trial, National Championships
