= 2024 European Speed Skating Championships =

Speed skating event in the Netherlands

- Venue: Thialf, Heerenveen, Netherlands
- Dates: 5–7 January

The 2024 European Speed Skating Championships were held between 5 and 7 January 2024, at the Thialf in Heerenveen, Netherlands.

== Schedule ==
All times are local (UTC+1).

Date	Time	Events
5 January	19:35	Team sprint women
5 January	19:51	Team pursuit men
5 January	20:26	3000 m women
5 January	21:30	1000 m men
6 January	14:30	Team sprint men
6 January	14:46	500 m women
6 January	15:29	5000 m men
6 January	17:03	1500 m women
7 January	14:15	Team pursuit women
7 January	14:37	1500 m men
7 January	15:31	1000 m women
7 January	16:19	500 m men
7 January	17:06	Mass start women
7 January	17:29	Mass start men

== Medal summary ==
=== Medal table ===
* Host nation (Netherlands)

Rank	Nation	Gold	Silver	Bronze	Total
1	Netherlands*	10	7	5	22
2	Norway	2	1	4	7
3	Poland	1	1	1	3
4	Belgium	1	0	0	1
5	Italy	0	2	1	3
6	Austria	0	1	2	3
7	Estonia	0	1	0	1
7	Germany	0	1	0	1
9	Switzerland	0	0	1	1
Totals (9 entries)		14	14	14	42

=== Men's events ===
Event	Gold		Silver		Bronze	
500 m	Jenning de Boo; Netherlands	34.48	Marten Liiv; Estonia	34.78	Marek Kania; Poland	34.86
1000 m	Kjeld Nuis; Netherlands	1:07.87	Jenning de Boo; Netherlands	1:08.14	Tim Prins; Netherlands	1:08.20
1500 m	Peder Kongshaug; Norway	1:44.25	Kjeld Nuis; Netherlands	1:44.34	Patrick Roest; Netherlands	1:44.40
5000 m	Patrick Roest; Netherlands	6:05.93	Davide Ghiotto; Italy	6:08.27	Sander Eitrem; Norway	6:09.28
Team pursuit	Norway; Sander Eitrem; Peder Kongshaug; Sverre Lunde Pedersen	3:34.22; WR	Italy; Davide Ghiotto; Andrea Giovannini; Michele Malfatti	3:40.47	Netherlands; Marcel Bosker; Bart Hoolwerf; Chris Huizinga	3:41.36
Team sprint	Poland; Marek Kania; Piotr Michalski; Damian Żurek	1:18.31	Norway; Pål Myhren Kristensen; Bjørn Magnussen; Håvard Holmefjord Lorentzen	1:18.81	Netherlands; Stefan Westenbroek; Jenning de Boo; Wesly Dijs	1:20.61
Mass start	Bart Swings; Belgium	60 pts	Gabriel Odor; Austria	40 pts	Allan Dahl Johansson; Norway	20 pts

=== Women's events ===
Event	Gold		Silver		Bronze	
500 m	Femke Kok; Netherlands	37.28	Jutta Leerdam; Netherlands	37.70	Vanessa Herzog; Austria	37.89
1000 m	Jutta Leerdam; Netherlands	1:14.45	Antoinette Rijpma-de Jong; Netherlands	1:15.04	Vanessa Herzog; Austria	1:15.74
1500 m	Antoinette Rijpma-de Jong; Netherlands	1:53.48	Marijke Groenewoud; Netherlands	1:53.66	Joy Beune; Netherlands	1:55.02
3000 m	Marijke Groenewoud; Netherlands	3:56.27	Irene Schouten; Netherlands	3:58.70	Ragne Wiklund; Norway	3:59.09
Team pursuit	Netherlands; Joy Beune; Marijke Groenewoud; Irene Schouten	2:55.70	Germany; Josie Hofmann; Josephine Schlörb; Lea Sophie Scholz	3:02.33	Switzerland; Jasmin Güntert; Ramona Härdi; Kaitlyn McGregor	3:02.40
Team sprint	Netherlands; Marrit Fledderus; Femke Kok; Antoinette Rijpma-de Jong	1:27.36	Poland; Andżelika Wójcik; Iga Wojtasik; Karolina Bosiek	1:28.06	Norway; Carina Jagtøyen; Julie Nistad Samsonsen; Martine Ripsrud	1:28.83
Mass start	Marijke Groenewoud; Netherlands	66 pts	Irene Schouten; Netherlands	40 pts	Francesca Lollobrigida; Italy	20 pts
