= Yang Binyu =

Chinese speed skater (born 2002)

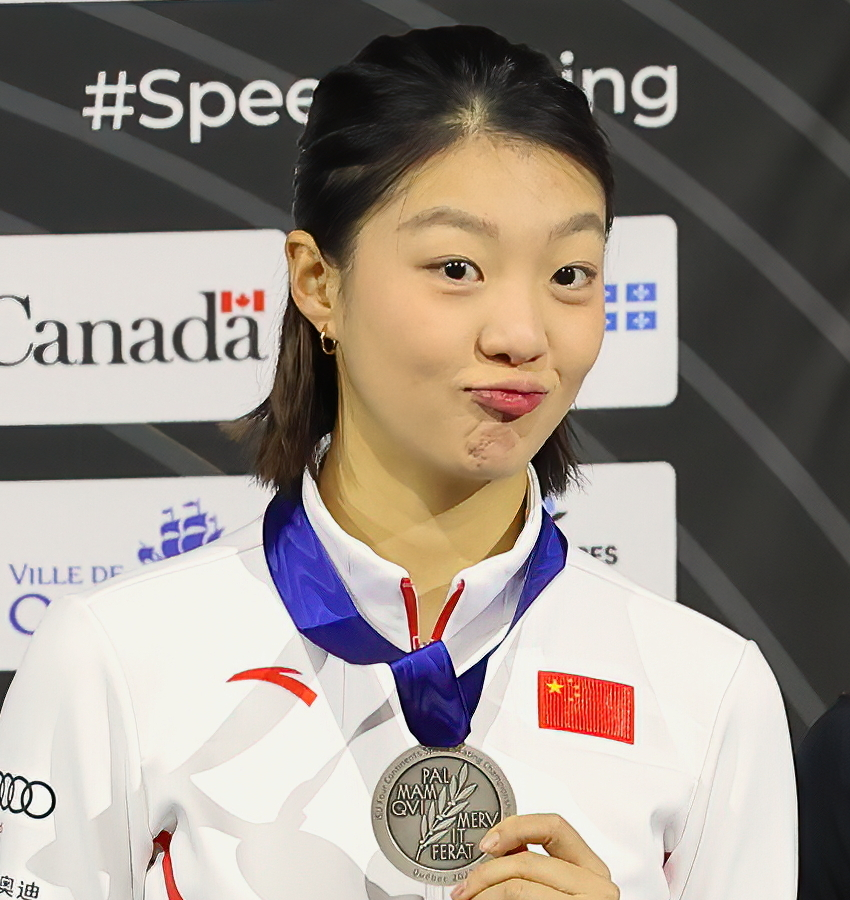
- Yang in 2022

Personal information
- Born: 25 July 2002 (age 23) Heilongjiang, China

Sport
- Country: China
- Sport: Speed skating
Medal record
Women's speed skating
Representing China
Four Continents Championships
Gold medal – first place	2023 Quebec	Team sprint
Silver medal – second place	2023 Quebec	Mass start
Silver medal – second place	2023 Quebec	Team pursuit
Gold medal – first place	2025 Hachinohe	Team pursuit
Asian Winter Games
Gold medal – first place	2025 Harbin	3000 m
Gold medal – first place	2025 Harbin	Team pursuit
Silver medal – second place	2025 Harbin	1500 m
Winter Youth Olympics
Gold medal – first place	2020 Gangwon	Mass start
Bronze medal – third place	2020 Gangwon	1500 m

Yang Binyu (Chinese: 杨滨瑜, born 25 July 2002) is a Chinese speed skater.

== Career ==
Yang represented China at the 2020 Winter Youth Olympics and won a gold medal in the mass start with a time of 6:50.68. This was China's first gold medal of the 2020 Winter Youth Olympics. She also won a bronze medal in the 1500 metres with a time of 2:10.93.

In February 2024, she competed at the 2024 World Single Distances Speed Skating Championships and finished in fourth place in the mass start with a time of 8:24.06 and in seventh place in the 5000 metres with a time of 7:03.74. The next month, she competed at the 2024 World Allround Speed Skating Championships and finished in 13th place with an overall score of 119.826.

She competed at the 2025 Four Continents Speed Skating Championships and won a gold medal in the team pursuit. In February 2025, she represented China at the 2025 Asian Winter Games and won a gold medal in the team pursuit and in the 3000 metres with a time of 4:08.54. She also won a silver medal in the 1500 metres with a time 1:58.06. The next month she competed at the 2025 World Single Distances Speed Skating Championships with her best result finishing in fourth place in the mass start with a time of 8:23.97.

She was selected to represent China at the 2026 Winter Olympics.
