= Francesca Lollobrigida =

Italian speed skater (born 1991)

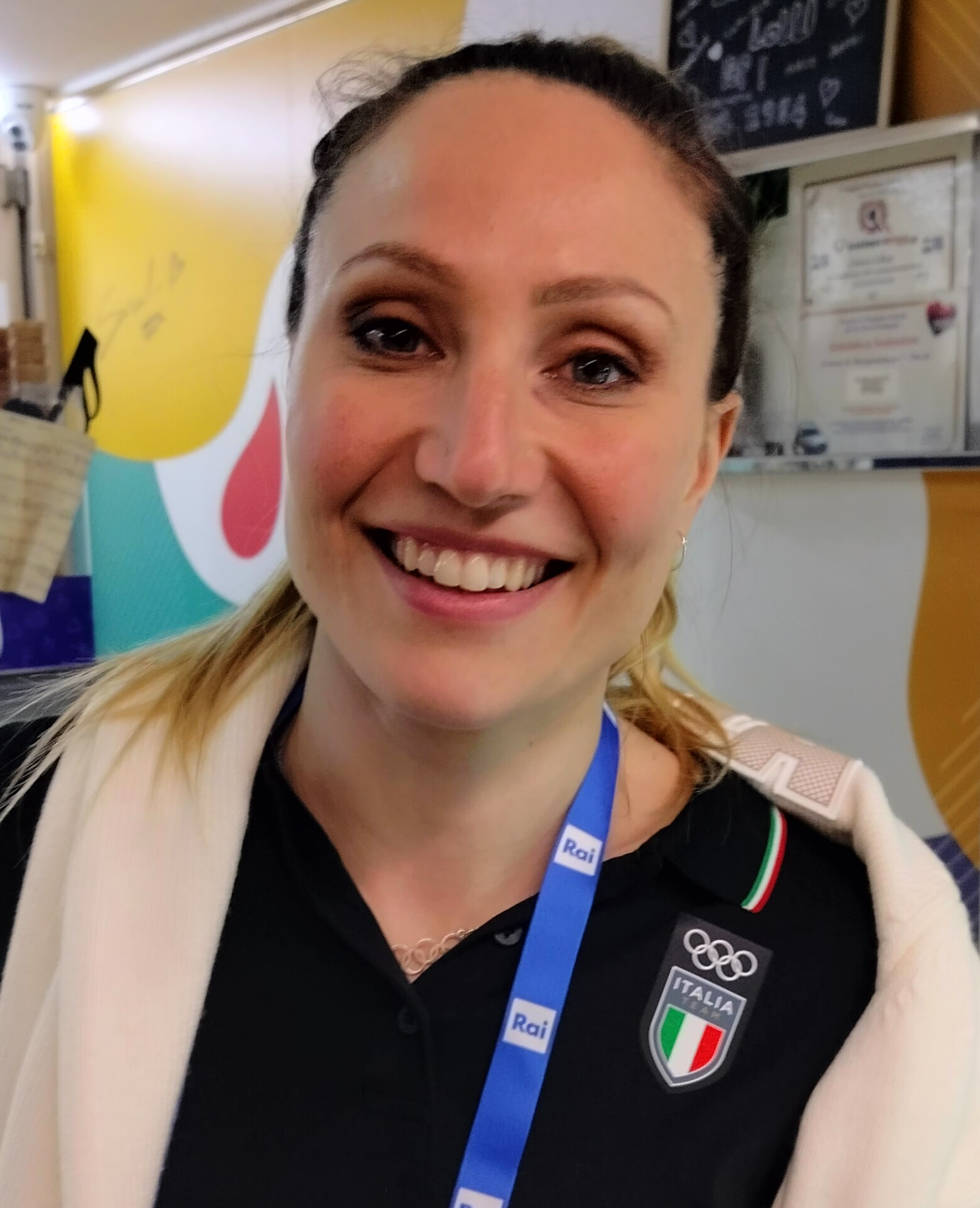
- Lollobrigida in 2026

Personal information
- Born: 7 February 1991 (age 35) Frascati, Italy

Sport
- Country: Italy
- Sport: Speed skating
Medal record
Women's speed skating
Representing Italy
Olympic Games
Gold medal – first place	2026 Milano Cortina	3000 m
Gold medal – first place	2026 Milano Cortina	5000 m
Silver medal – second place	2022 Beijing	3000 m
Bronze medal – third place	2022 Beijing	Mass start
World Single Distances Championships
Gold medal – first place	2025 Hamar	5000 m
Bronze medal – third place	2025 Hamar	Mass start
European Championships
Gold medal – first place	2018 Kolomna	Mass start
Silver medal – second place	2020 Heerenveen	Mass start
Silver medal – second place	2026 Tomaszów Mazowiecki	Mass start
Bronze medal – third place	2019 Collalbo	Allround
Bronze medal – third place	2020 Heerenveen	3000 m
Bronze medal – third place	2022 Heerenveen	1500 m
Bronze medal – third place	2022 Heerenveen	3000 m
Bronze medal – third place	2024 Heerenveen	Mass start

Francesca Lollobrigida (born in Frascati on 7 February 1991) is an Italian speed skater. On her 35th birthday, in the 3000 metres speed skating event at the 2026 Milano Cortina Olympic Games, she became the first Italian woman to win the Olympic gold medal at that distance, setting a new Olympic record in the process. She subsequently won the gold medal in the 5000 meters speed skating event.

== Career ==
Lollobrigida is a four-time Olympian, having first competed at the 2014 Winter Olympics in Sochi, where she placed 23rd in the 3000 meters. She is the current holder of the Italian records in 3000 and 5000 metres. She also won two medals, silver and bronze, in speed skating at the 2022 Winter Olympics. She has also won two gold medals in the 3000 and 5000 metre events at the 2026 Milano-Cortina Olympics. She set an Olympic record in the 3000 metre event, which occurred on her 35th birthday.

Lollobrigida has won 9 world championships in inline speed skating.

== Personal life ==
Actress Gina Lollobrigida was her great aunt, and the two did meet.

Her father was a rollerskating champion and swim coach; her mother was a physical education teacher.

The lawyer and politician, and current Minister of Agriculture of Italy, Francesco Lollobrigida, is her cousin.

In May 2023, she gave birth to her son Tommaso. Although Tommaso skated before his first birthday, at age two he began to associate skates with his mother's absence, so he refused to skate at times.

== Speed skating ==
=== Personal records ===
Personal records
Speed skating
Event	Result	Date	Location	Notes
500 m	39.06	2 March 2019	Olympic Oval, Calgary	
1000 m	1:15.94	23 February 2019	Olympic Oval, Calgary	
1500 m	1:52.86	12 December 2021	Olympic Oval, Calgary	
5000 m	6:46.17	12 February 2026	Fiera Milano, Milan	Current Italian record
3000 m	3:54.28	7 February 2026	Fiera Milano, Milan	Current Olympic record Current Italian record

== See also ==
- Italian sportswomen multiple medalists at Olympics and World Championships
