= Michelle Uhrig =

German speed skater (born 1996)

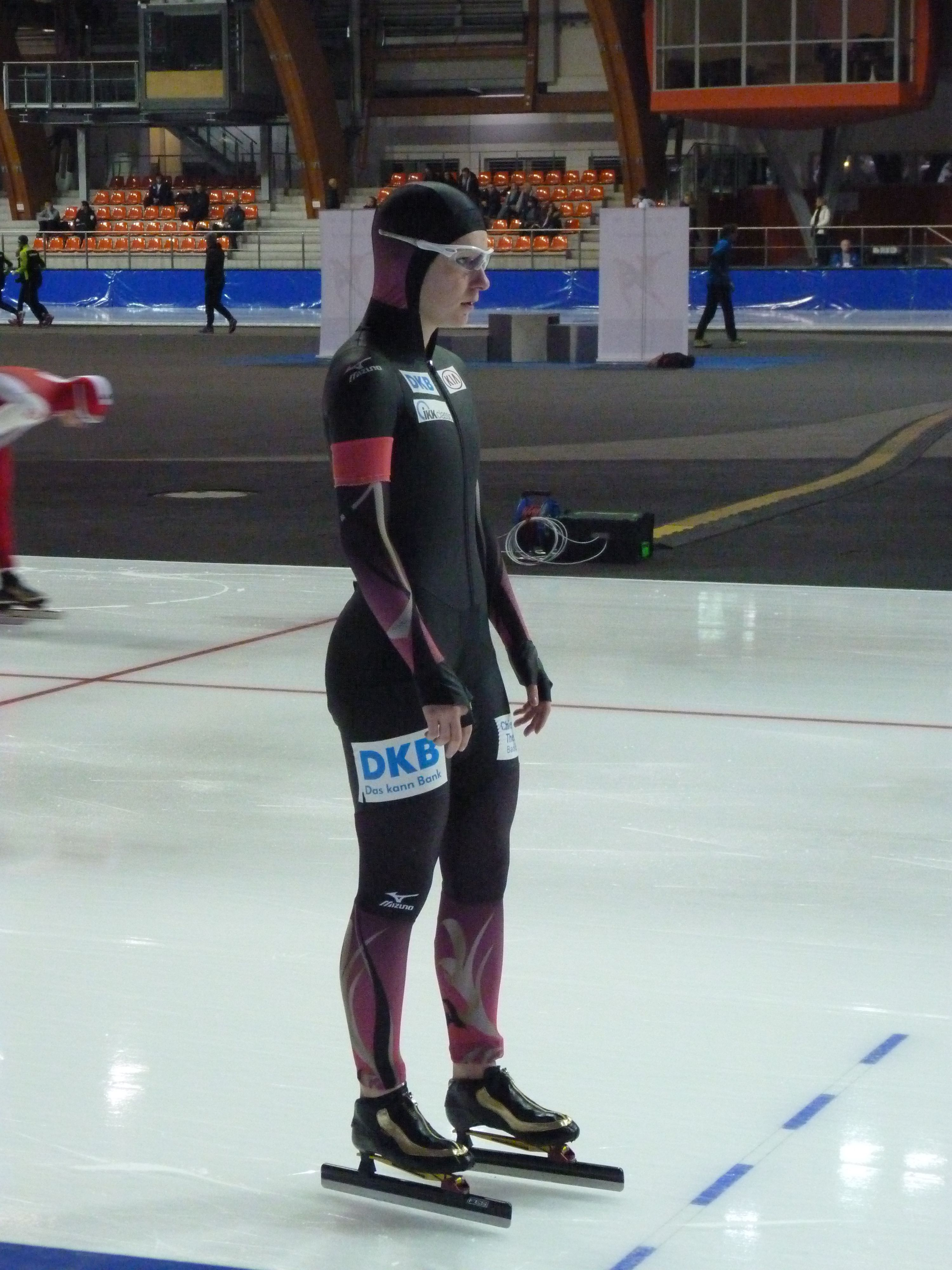
- Michelle Uhrig in 2017

Personal information
- Nationality: German
- Born: 20 January 1996 (age 30) Berlin, Germany

Sport
- Sport: Speed skating

Michelle Uhrig (born 20 January 1996) is a German speed skater. She competed in the women's 1000 metres at the 2018 Winter Olympics. In November 2019, she became the German national champion 1000 metres, and 1500 metres.
