= Magdalena Czyszczoń =

Polish speed skater (born 1995)

Personal information
- Nationality: Polish
- Born: 4 March 1995 (age 31) Zakopane, Poland
- Height: 165 cm (5 ft 5 in)
- Weight: 69 kg (152 lb)

Sport
- Country: Poland
- Sport: Speed skating
Medal record
Women's speed skating
Representing Poland
European Championships
Bronze medal – third place	2026 Tomaszow Mazowiecki	Team pursuit

Magdalena Czyszczoń (born 4 March 1995) is a Polish speed skater. She competed in the women's 16 lap mass start event during the 2018 Winter Olympics. In 2026 she won the bronze medal at the European Championships in distances in the team race.
