= Ramona Härdi =

Swiss speed skater (born 1997)

Ramona Härdi Ramona Haerdi
Personal information
- National team: Germany
- Born: 9 April 1997 (age 29) Möriken, Aargau, Switzerland
- Height: 171 cm (5 ft 7 in)
- Weight: 66 kg (146 lb)
- Website: ramonahaerdi.ch

Sport
- Country: Switzerland
- Sport: Speed Skating
- Event: 3000m (Mass Start)

Achievements and titles
- Olympic finals: 2018 Winter Olympics
Medal record
Women's speed skating
Representing Switzerland
European Championships
Bronze medal – third place	2024 Heerenveen	Team pursuit

Ramona Härdi (also spelled Haerdi; born 9 April 1997 in Möriken, Aargau, Switzerland) is a Swiss speed-skater. She competed for Switzerland at the 2018 Winter Olympics in the ladies' mass start.

== Biography ==
At the age of six, Härdi took up inline skating and switched to speed skating later. She moved to Heerenveen, Netherlands in order for her to train for tournaments.

== Career ==
Härdi started her career in inline skating. In 2012, she participated in the Swiss Skate Tour Final in Geisingen, Germany, where she placed first, She competed at the Swiss Championships in September 2013 and came in third place.

Härdi's first major speed skating events were the 3000m at the Junior World Cup in Baselga di Pinè, Italy, and the 2016 World Junior Championships in Changchun, China. In Italy, she came in fourteenth; in China, she came in fifteenth. The two events helped her overall rank twenty-third in the 2015-16 World Cup season with 45 points, thus qualifying her for the 2018 Winter Olympics.

Härdi competed at the 2018 European Speed Skating Championships in Kolomna, Russia and finished thirteenth.

== 2018 Winter Olympics ==
On 15 January 2018, it was announced by the Swiss Olympic team that Härdi would make her Olympic debut at the 2018 Winter Olympics. She and Livio Wenger are the only two Swiss speed skaters at the games. Härdi is the first Swiss skater to compete in the ladies' mass start event since its introduction at the 2018 Winter Olympics.

In Pyeongchang, Härdi competed in the ladies' mass start. In the semi-finals, she did not finish, completing 4/16 laps, at a time of 2:49.59; ranking 12th. She did not qualify for the finals.
