= 2020 World Allround Speed Skating Championships – Women =

Women at the 2020 World Allround Speed Skating Championships
- Venue: Vikingskipet
- Location: Hamar, Norway
- Dates: 29 February – 1 March
- Competitors: 24 from 12 nations
- Winning points: 159.524

Medalists
gold medal	Ireen Wüst	Netherlands
silver medal	Ivanie Blondin	Canada
bronze medal	Antoinette de Jong	Netherlands

The women's competition at the 2020 World Allround Speed Skating Championships was held on 29 February and 1 March 2020.

== Results ==
=== 500 m ===
The race was started on 29 February at 11:54.

Rank	Pair	Lane	Name	Country	Time	Diff
1	11	I	Karolina Bosiek	Poland	38.76	
2	12	I	Nana Takagi	Japan	38.86	+0.10
2	3	O	Elizaveta Kazelina	Russia	38.86	+0.10
4	10	O	Ireen Wüst	Netherlands	38.96	+0.20
5	4	I	Ayano Sato	Japan	38.99	+0.23
6	9	O	Melissa Wijfje	Netherlands	39.15	+0.39
7	9	I	Nikola Zdráhalová	Czech Republic	39.18	+0.42
8	12	O	Ivanie Blondin	Canada	39.19	+0.43
9	7	O	Evgeniia Lalenkova	Russia	39.29	+0.53
10	7	I	Francesca Lollobrigida	Italy	39.30	+0.54
11	11	O	Han Mei	China	39.35	+0.59
12	10	I	Antoinette de Jong	Netherlands	39.39	+0.63
13	5	O	Yin Qi	China	39.48	+0.72
14	8	O	Nadezhda Morozova	Kazakhstan	+40.15	+1.39
15	1	O	Natalia Voronina	Russia	+40.17	+1.41
16	2	O	Nene Sakai	Japan	+40.22	+1.46
17	3	I	Valérie Maltais	Canada	+40.24	+1.48
18	6	I	Martina Sáblíková	Czech Republic	+40.30	+1.54
19	5	I	Roxanne Dufter	Germany	+40.53	+1.77
20	8	I	Maryna Zuyeva	Belarus	+40.56	+1.80
21	6	O	Karolina Gąsecka	Poland	+40.60	+1.84
22	4	O	Isabelle Weidemann	Canada	+40.67	+1.91
23	1	I	Sofie Karoline Haugen	Norway	+40.71	+1.95
24	2	I	Claudia Pechstein	Germany	+41.06	+2.30

=== 3000 m ===
The race was started on 29 February at 14:50.

Rank	Pair	Lane	Name	Country	Time	Diff
1	10	I	Martina Sáblíková	Czech Republic	4:01.89	
2	11	I	Ivanie Blondin	Canada	4:02.54	+0.65
3	7	O	Ireen Wüst	Netherlands	4:02.60	+0.71
4	6	O	Melissa Wijfje	Netherlands	4:02.81	+0.92
5	11	O	Antoinette de Jong	Netherlands	4:03.40	+1.51
6	12	I	Isabelle Weidemann	Canada	4:04.03	+2.14
7	9	O	Natalia Voronina	Russia	4:04.13	+2.24
8	9	I	Francesca Lollobrigida	Italy	4:04.14	+2.25
9	10	O	Evgeniia Lalenkova	Russia	4:04.30	+2.41
10	5	O	Ayano Sato	Japan	4:06.68	+4.79
11	2	I	Nadezhda Morozova	Kazakhstan	4:08.25	+6.36
11	12	O	Maryna Zuyeva	Belarus	4:08.25	+6.36
13	7	I	Nana Takagi	Japan	4:08.59	+6.70
14	3	I	Elizaveta Kazelina	Russia	4:08.82	+6.93
15	5	I	Valérie Maltais	Canada	4:09.01	+7.12
16	8	I	Nikola Zdráhalová	Czech Republic	4:09.34	+7.45
17	6	I	Claudia Pechstein	Germany	4:09.66	+7.77
18	1	O	Karolina Bosiek	Poland	4:12.90	+11.01
19	4	I	Nene Sakai	Japan	4:12.91	+11.02
20	2	O	Yin Qi	China	4:13.70	+11.81
21	3	O	Sofie Karoline Haugen	Norway	4:14.21	+12.32
22	1	I	Han Mei	China	4:14.71	+12.82
23	8	O	Roxanne Dufter	Germany	4:14.83	+12.94
24	4	O	Karolina Gąsecka	Poland	4:19.74	+17.85

=== 1500 m ===
The race was started on 1 March at 13:00.

Rank	Pair	Lane	Name	Country	Time	Diff
1	12	I	Ireen Wüst	Netherlands	1:53.89	
2	10	O	Evgeniia Lalenkova	Russia	1:54.85	+0.96
3	9	O	Nana Takagi	Japan	1:55.15	+1.26
4	11	O	Antoinette de Jong	Netherlands	1:55.19	+1.30
5	12	O	Ivanie Blondin	Canada	1:55.21	+1.32
6	11	I	Melissa Wijfje	Netherlands	1:55.72	+1.83
7	8	O	Martina Sáblíková	Czech Republic	1:55.89	+2.00
8	9	I	Ayano Sato	Japan	1:56.03	+2.14
9	8	I	Elizaveta Kazelina	Russia	1:56.39	+2.50
10	7	O	Natalia Voronina	Russia	1:56.68	+2.79
11	7	I	Nikola Zdráhalová	Czech Republic	1:56.73	+2.84
12	6	O	Isabelle Weidemann	Canada	1:56.87	+2.98
13	10	I	Francesca Lollobrigida	Italy	1:57.22	+3.33
14	4	O	Han Mei	China	1:57.33	+3.44
15	6	I	Karolina Bosiek	Poland	1:57.42	+3.53
16	4	I	Yin Qi	China	1:57.68	+3.79
17	3	O	Claudia Pechstein	Germany	1:59.14	+5.25
18	5	O	Valérie Maltais	Canada	1:59.29	+5.40
19	2	I	Roxanne Dufter	Germany	1:59.31	+5.42
20	3	I	Nene Sakai	Japan	2:00.47	+6.58
21	2	O	Sofie Karoline Haugen	Norway	2:00.62	+6.73
22	5	I	Nadezhda Morozova	Kazakhstan	2:01.54	+7.65
23	1	I	Karolina Gąsecka	Poland	2:04.32	+10.43
–	–		Maryna Zuyeva	Belarus	Withdrawn	

=== 5000 m ===
The race was started on 1 March at 14:43.

Rank	Pair	Lane	Name	Country	Time	Diff
1	2	I	Martina Sáblíková	Czech Republic	6:53.94	
2	4	O	Ireen Wüst	Netherlands	7:01.68	+7.74
3	2	O	Antoinette de Jong	Netherlands	7:02.79	+8.85
4	4	I	Ivanie Blondin	Canada	7:04.46	+10.52
5	3	O	Evgeniia Lalenkova	Russia	7:05.20	+11.26
5	3	I	Melissa Wijfje	Netherlands	7:05.20	+11.26
7	1	I	Francesca Lollobrigida	Italy	7:12.00	+18.06
8	1	O	Nana Takagi	Japan	7:19.56	+25.62

=== Overall standings ===
After all events.

Rank	Name	Country	500m	3000m	1500m	5000m	Points	Diff
1st place, gold medalist(s)	Ireen Wüst	Netherlands	38.96	4:02.60	1:53.89	7:01.68	159.524	
2nd place, silver medalist(s)	Ivanie Blondin	Canada	39.19	4:02.54	1:55.21	7:04.46	160.462	+0.94
3rd place, bronze medalist(s)	Antoinette de Jong	Netherlands	39.39	4:03.40	1:55.19	7:02.79	160.631	+1.11
4	Martina Sáblíková	Czech Republic	40.30	4:01.89	1:55.89	6:53.94	160.639	+1.12
5	Melissa Wijfje	Netherlands	39.15	4:02.81	1:55.72	7:05.20	160.711	+1.19
6	Evgeniia Lalenkova	Russia	39.29	4:04.30	1:54.85	7:05.20	160.809	+1.29
7	Francesca Lollobrigida	Italy	39.30	4:04.14	1:57.22	7:12.00	162.263	+2.74
8	Nana Takagi	Japan	38.86	4:08.59	1:55.15	7:19.56	162.630	+3.11
9	Ayano Sato	Japan	38.99	4:06.68	1:56.03	—	118.779	—
10	Elizaveta Kazelina	Russia	38.86	4:08.82	1:56.39	—	119.126	—
11	Nikola Zdráhalová	Czech Republic	39.18	4:09.34	1:56.73	—	119.646	—
12	Natalia Voronina	Russia	40.21	4:04.13	1:56.68	—	119.791	—
13	Karolina Bosiek	Poland	38.76	4:12.90	1:57.42	—	120.050	—
14	Isabelle Weidemann	Canada	40.67	4:04.03	1:56.87	—	120.297	—
15	Han Mei	China	39.35	4:14.71	1:57.33	—	120.911	—
16	Yin Qi	China	39.48	4:13.70	1:57.68	—	120.989	—
17	Valérie Maltais	Canada	40.24	4:09.01	1:59.29	—	121.504	—
18	Nadezhda Morozova	Kazakhstan	40.15	4:08.25	2:01.54	—	122.038	—
19	Claudia Pechstein	Germany	41.06	4:09.66	1:59.14	—	122.383	—
20	Nene Sakai	Japan	40.22	4:12.91	2:00.47	—	122.527	—
21	Roxanne Dufter	Germany	40.53	4:14.83	1:59.31	—	122.771	—
22	Sofie Karoline Haugen	Norway	40.71	4:14.21	2:00.62	—	123.284	—
23	Karolina Gąsecka	Poland	40.60	4:19.74	2:04.32	—	125.330	—
	Maryna Zuyeva	Belarus	40.56	4:08.25	Did not start	—	Did not finish	
