= 2022–23 ISU Speed Skating World Cup – World Cup 1 =

International speed skating competition

2022–23 ISU Speed Skating World Cup 1
- Venue: Stavanger Norway
- Dates: 11 November 2022 — 13 November 2022

The first competition weekend of the 2022–23 ISU Speed Skating World Cup was held at the Sørmarka Arena in Stavanger, Norway, from Friday, 11 November, until Sunday, 13 November 2022.

== Medal summary ==
=== Men's events ===
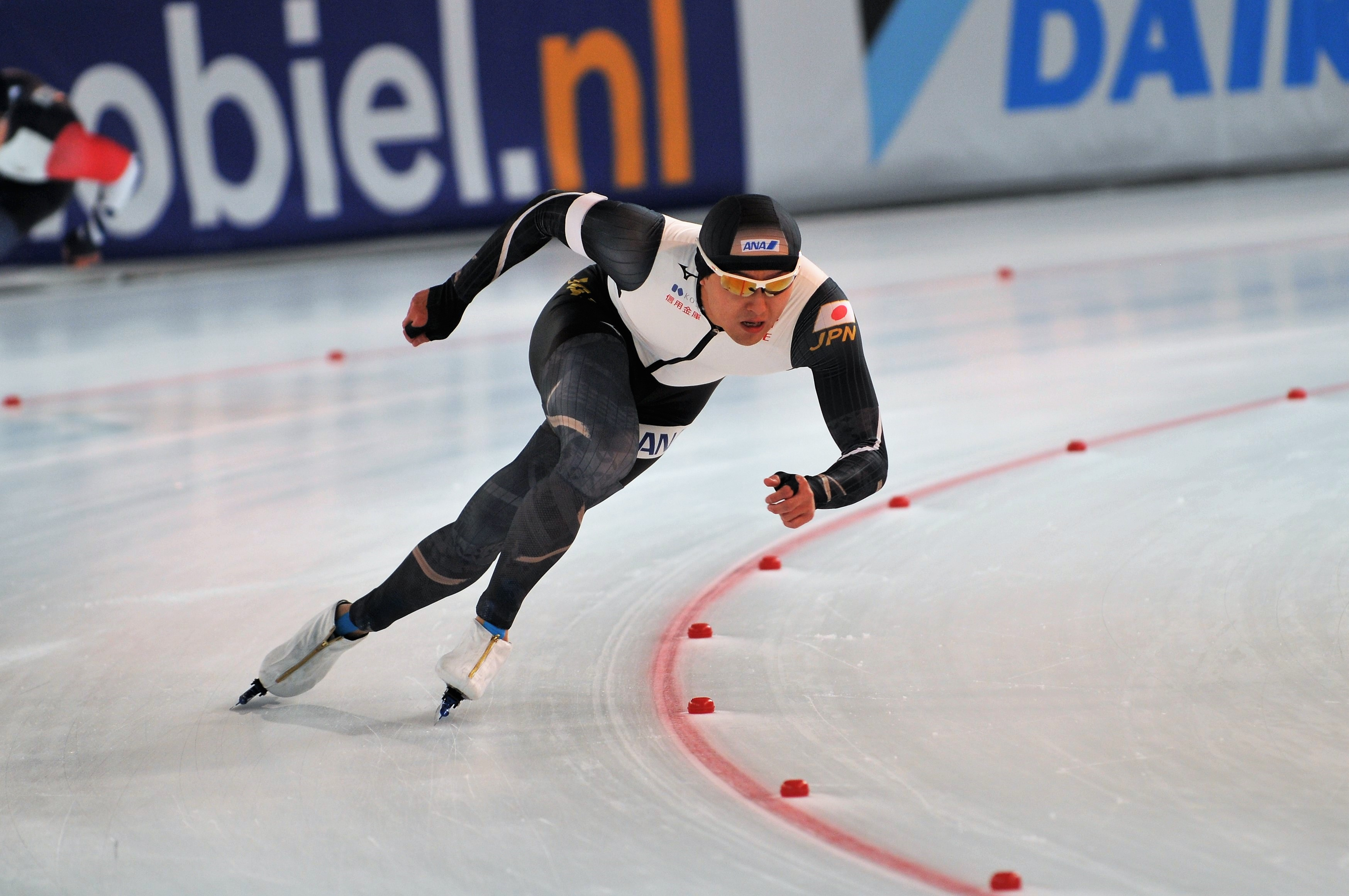
Yuma Murakami on his way to a gold medal on the 500 m in Stavanger.

Event	Gold	Time	Silver	Time	Bronze	Time	Report
500 m	Yuma Murakami; Japan	34.70	Laurent Dubreuil; Canada	34.75	Kim Jun-ho; South Korea	35.01	
1000 m	Jordan Stolz; United States	1:08.73	Laurent Dubreuil; Canada	1:09.22	Ryota Kojima; Japan	1:09.31	
1500 m	Jordan Stolz; United States	1:44.89; TR	Connor Howe; Canada	1:46.65	Ning Zhongyan; China	1:46.68	
5000 m	Patrick Roest; Netherlands	6:20.56	Davide Ghiotto; Italy	6:21.51	Beau Snellink; Netherlands	6:22.28	
Mass start^{A}	Felix Rijhnen; Germany	68	Gabriel Odor; Austria	47	Bart Hoolwerf; Netherlands	20	
Team pursuit	United States; Casey Dawson; Emery Lehman; Ethan Cepuran	3:44.01	Netherlands; Patrick Roest; Marcel Bosker; Beau Snellink	3:44.61	Norway; Hallgeir Engebråten; Peder Kongshaug; Sverre Lunde Pedersen	3:45.42	

^{A} In mass start, race points are accumulated during the race based on results of the intermediate sprints and the final sprint. The skater with most race points is the winner.

=== Women's events ===
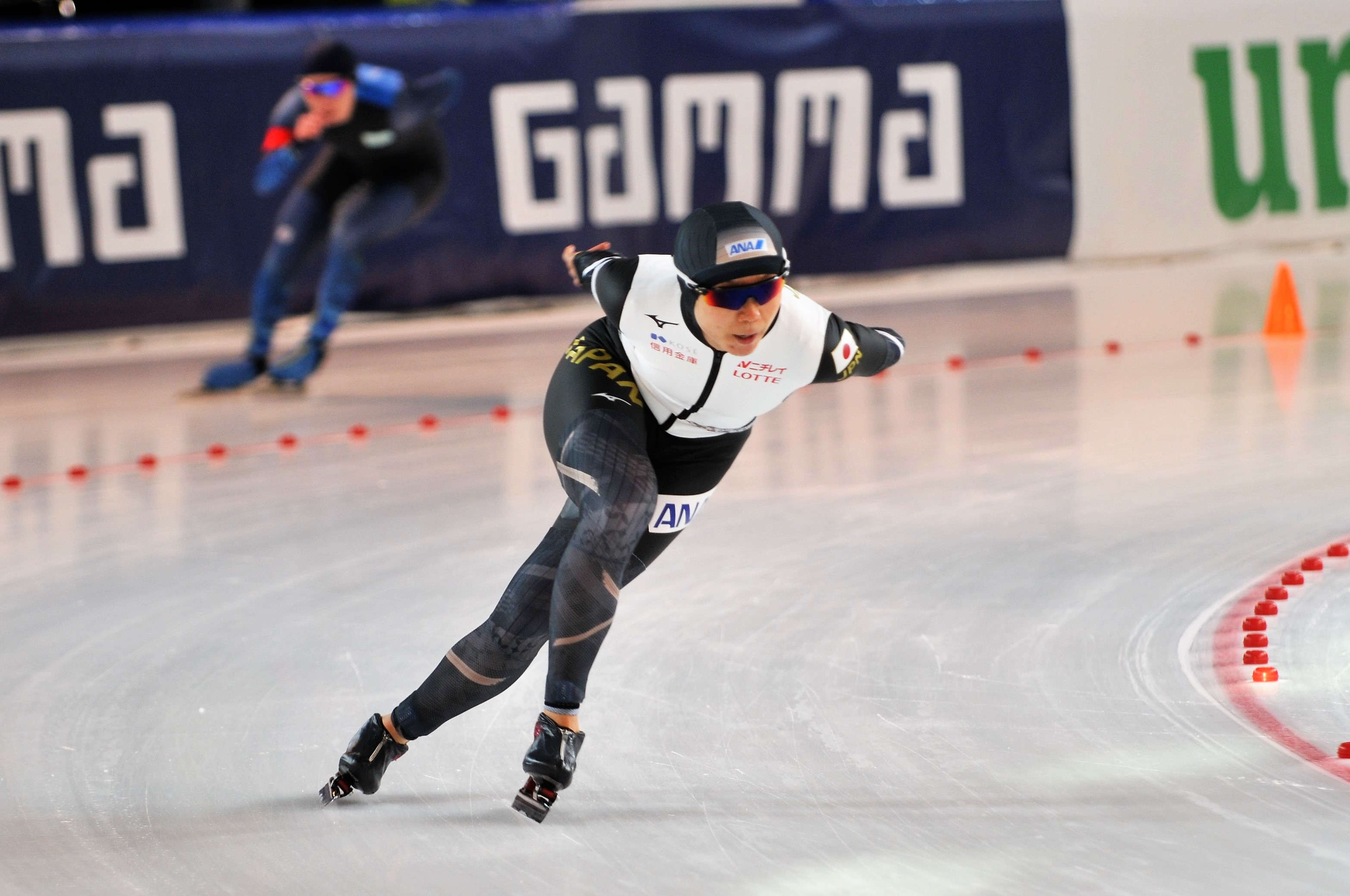
Miho Takagi won a gold medal on the 1500 m, in addition to 3 bronze medals.

Event	Gold	Time	Silver	Time	Bronze	Time	Report
500 m	Kim Min-sun; South Korea	37.55	Jutta Leerdam; Netherlands	38.06	Miho Takagi; Japan	38.17	
1000 m	Jutta Leerdam; Netherlands	1:15.61	Kim Min-sun; South Korea	1:15.82	Miho Takagi; Japan	1:16.41	
1500 m	Miho Takagi; Japan	1:56.55	Ragne Wiklund; Norway	1:57.49	Marijke Groenewoud; Netherlands	1:58.19	
3000 m	Ragne Wiklund; Norway	4:03.11	Irene Schouten; Netherlands	4:05.01	Isabelle Weidemann; Canada	4:05.46	
Mass start^{A}	Ivanie Blondin; Canada	61	Marijke Groenewoud; Netherlands	42	Irene Schouten; Netherlands	20	
Team pursuit	Canada; Valérie Maltais; Ivanie Blondin; Isabelle Weidemann	3:01.81	Netherlands; Antoinette Rijpma-de Jong; Irene Schouten; Marijke Groenewoud	3:02.29	Japan; Miho Takagi; Ayano Sato; Momoka Horikawa	3:02.90	

^{A} In mass start, race points are accumulated during the race based on results of the intermediate sprints and the final sprint. The skater with most race points is the winner.

== Results ==
=== Men's events ===
==== 500 m ====
The race started on 12 November 2022 at 13:41.

Rank	Pair	Lane	Name	Country	Time	Diff
1st place, gold medalist(s)	9	i	Yuma Murakami	Japan	34.70	
2nd place, silver medalist(s)	10	o	Laurent Dubreuil	Canada	34.75	+0.05
3rd place, bronze medalist(s)	9	o	Kim Jun-ho	South Korea	35.01	+0.31
4	10	i	Wataru Morishige	Japan	35.01	+0.31
5	5	o	Takuya Morimoto	Japan	35.14	+0.44
6	1	i	Janno Botman	Netherlands	35.22	+0.52
7	4	i	Christopher Fiola	Canada	35.24	+0.54
8	8	i	Piotr Michalski	Poland	35.32	+0.62
9	3	i	Merijn Scheperkamp	Netherlands	35.32	+0.62
10	6	o	Dai Dai N'tab	Netherlands	35.40	+0.70
11	7	o	Damian Żurek	Poland	35.48	+0.78
12	7	i	Håvard Holmefjord Lorentzen	Norway	35.50	+0.80
13	4	o	Marek Kania	Poland	35.55	+0.85
14	8	o	Yang Tao	China	35.57	+0.87
15	1	o	Cedrick Brunet	Canada	35.68	+0.98
16	2	o	Taiyo Nonomura	Japan	35.76	+1.06
17	6	i	Cha Min-kyu	South Korea	35.80	+1.10
18	3	o	Du Haonan	China	35.89	+1.19
19	5	i	Hein Otterspeer	Netherlands	35.99	+1.29
	2	i	Ryota Kojima	Japan	Disqualified	

==== 1000 m ====
The race started on 13 November 2022 at 14:48.

Rank	Pair	Lane	Name	Country	Time	Diff
1st place, gold medalist(s)	8	i	Jordan Stolz	United States	1:08.73	
2nd place, silver medalist(s)	6	i	Laurent Dubreuil	Canada	1:09.22	+0.49
3rd place, bronze medalist(s)	6	o	Ryota Kojima	Japan	1:09.31	+0.58
4	3	i	Masaya Yamada	Japan	1:09.58	+0.85
5	8	o	Thomas Krol	Netherlands	1:09.65	+0.92
6	9	o	Hein Otterspeer	Netherlands	1:09.77	+1.04
7	9	i	Ning Zhongyan	China	1:09.83	+1.10
8	5	i	Taiyo Nonomura	Japan	1:09.87	+1.14
9	1	i	Wesly Dijs	Netherlands	1:09.92	+1.19
10	2	i	Joep Wennemars	Netherlands	1:09.99	+1.26
11	5	o	Moritz Klein	Germany	1:10.16	+1.43
12	7	o	Connor Howe	Canada	1:10.29	+1.56
13	4	o	Antoine Gélinas-Beaulieu	Canada	1:10.47	+1.74
14	10	i	Håvard Holmefjord Lorentzen	Norway	1:10.47	+1.74
15	10	o	Marten Liiv	Estonia	1:10.49	+1.76
16	1	o	Kim Tae-yun	South Korea	1:10.64	+1.91
17	4	i	Henrik Fagerli Rukke	Norway	1:10.76	+2.03
18	7	i	Piotr Michalski	Poland	1:10.81	+2.08
19	3	o	Tyson Langelaar	Canada	1:10.85	+2.12
20	2	o	Louis Hollaar	Netherlands	1:10.91	+2.18

==== 1500 m ====
The race started on 11 November 2022 at 17:00.

Rank	Pair	Lane	Name	Country	Time	Diff
1st place, gold medalist(s)	6	i	Jordan Stolz	United States	1:44.89; TR	
2nd place, silver medalist(s)	9	o	Connor Howe	Canada	1:46.65	+1.76
3rd place, bronze medalist(s)	8	o	Ning Zhongyan	China	1:46.68	+1.79
4	7	i	Peder Kongshaug	Norway	1:46.75	+1.86
5	2	i	Kazuya Yamada	Japan	1:46.90	+2.01
6	1	o	Masaya Yamada	Japan	1:47.12	+2.23
7	2	o	Patrick Roest	Netherlands	1:47.24	+2.35
8	7	o	Bart Swings	Belgium	1:47.30	+2.41
9	8	i	Wesly Dijs	Netherlands	1:47.37	+2.48
10	5	o	Kristian Ulekleiv	Norway	1:47.73	+2.84
11	4	o	Tyson Langelaar	Canada	1:47.76	+2.87
12	4	i	Taiyo Nonomura	Japan	1:47.85	+2.96
13	3	i	Hallgeir Engebråten	Norway	1:47.88	+2.99
14	10	i	Allan Dahl Johansson	Norway	1:48.02	+3.13
15	1	i	Louis Hollaar	Netherlands	1:48.06	+3.17
16	10	o	Thomas Krol	Netherlands	1:48.37	+3.48
17	5	i	Emery Lehman	United States	1:48.47	+3.58
18	3	o	Stefan Emele	Germany	1:49.29	+4.40
19	9	i	Seitaro Ichinohe	Japan	1:49.42	+4.53
20	6	o	Mathias Vosté	Belgium	1:51.15	+6.26

==== 5000 m ====
The race started on 12 November 2022 at 14:20.

Rank	Pair	Lane	Name	Country	Time	Diff
1st place, gold medalist(s)	8	o	Patrick Roest	Netherlands	6:20.56	
2nd place, silver medalist(s)	7	o	Davide Ghiotto	Italy	6:21.51	+0.95
3rd place, bronze medalist(s)	3	o	Beau Snellink	Netherlands	6:22.28	+1.72
4	6	i	Marcel Bosker	Netherlands	6:24.09	+3.53
5	2	i	Kars Jansman	Netherlands	6:26.82	+6.26
6	6	o	Hallgeir Engebråten	Norway	6:26.90	+6.34
7	7	i	Bart Swings	Belgium	6:27.59	+7.03
8	4	i	Seitaro Ichinohe	Japan	6:30.22	+9.66
9	5	i	Felix Rijhnen	Germany	6:30.33	+9.77
10	5	o	Graeme Fish	Canada	6:31.26	+10.70
11	3	i	Riku Tsuchiya	Japan	6:31.72	+11.16
12	2	o	Jordan Belchos	Canada	6:33.08	+12.52
13	4	o	Andrea Giovannini	Italy	6:34.06	+13.50
14	8	i	Casey Dawson	United States	6:34.87	+14.31
15	1	o	Jordy van Workum	Netherlands	6:37.16	+16.60
16	1	i	Felix Maly	Germany	6:37.91	+17.35

==== Mass start ====
The race started on 13 November 2022 at 15:50.

Rank	Name	Country	Points	Time
1st place, gold medalist(s)	Felix Rijhnen	Germany	68	8:03.98
2nd place, silver medalist(s)	Gabriel Odor	Austria	47	8:04.08
3rd place, bronze medalist(s)	Bart Hoolwerf	Netherlands	20	8:15.20
4	Andrea Giovannini	Italy	10	8:15.36
5	Bart Swings	Belgium	7	8:15.45
6	Chung Jae-won	South Korea	3	8:15.49
7	Louis Hollaar	Netherlands	1	8:25.98
8	Felix Maly	Germany	1	8:26.27
9	Lee Seung-hoon	South Korea		8:15.67
10	Livio Wenger	Switzerland		8:15.71
11	Hayden Mayeur	Canada		8:15.87
12	Ethan Cepuran	United States		8:15.91
13	Kristian Ulekleiv	Norway		8:15.95
14	Timothy Loubineaud	France		8:16.72
15	Philip Due Schmidt	Denmark		8:19.29
16	Shen Hanyang	China		8:19.95

==== Team pursuit ====
The race started on 11 November 2022 at 19:15.

Rank	Pair	Lane	Country	Time	Diff
1st place, gold medalist(s)	4	s	United States; Casey Dawson; Emery Lehman; Ethan Cepuran	3:44.01	
2nd place, silver medalist(s)	3	c	Netherlands; Patrick Roest; Marcel Bosker; Beau Snellink	3:44.61	+0.60
3rd place, bronze medalist(s)	4	c	Norway; Hallgeir Engebråten; Peder Kongshaug; Sverre Lunde Pedersen	3:45.42	+1.41
4	2	s	Italy; Andrea Giovannini; Davide Ghiotto; Daniele Di Stefano	3:46.06	+2.05
5	3	s	Canada; Tyson Langelaar; Antoine Gélinas-Beaulieu; Connor Howe	3:50.23	+6.22
6	1	s	Denmark; Viktor Hald Thorup; Stefan Due Schmidt; Philip Due Schmidt	3:52.34	+8.33
7	2	c	China; Shen Hanyang; Wang Shiwei; Wu Yu	3:55.26	+11.25
	1	c	Poland; Szymon Pałka; Marcin Bachanek; Artur Janicki	Disqualified	

=== Women's events ===
==== 500 m ====
The race started on 11 November 2022 at 17:45.

Rank	Pair	Lane	Name	Country	Time	Diff
1st place, gold medalist(s)	9	o	Kim Min-sun	South Korea	37.55	
2nd place, silver medalist(s)	8	i	Jutta Leerdam	Netherlands	38.06	+0.51
3rd place, bronze medalist(s)	10	o	Miho Takagi	Japan	38.17	+0.62
4	7	o	Vanessa Herzog	Austria	38.21	+0.66
5	6	o	Michelle de Jong	Netherlands	38.22	+0.67
6	9	i	Andżelika Wójcik	Poland	38.25	+0.70
7	5	o	Dione Voskamp	Netherlands	38.25	+0.70
8	8	o	Erin Jackson	United States	38.30	+0.75
9	4	i	Marrit Fledderus	Netherlands	38.39	+0.84
10	7	i	Kimi Goetz	United States	38.58	+1.03
11	2	o	Kurumi Inagawa	Japan	38.63	+1.08
12	10	i	Femke Kok	Netherlands	38.64	+1.09
13	4	o	Kako Yamane	Japan	38.69	+1.14
14	6	i	Jin Jingzhu	China	38.90	+1.35
15	5	i	Yekaterina Aydova	Kazakhstan	38.93	+1.38
16	1	i	Carolina Hiller	Canada	38.97	+1.42
17	3	i	Brooklyn McDougall	Canada	39.04	+1.49
18	3	o	Zhang Lina	China	39.60	+2.05
19	2	i	Sarah Warren	United States	39.76	+2.21
20	1	o	Béatrice Lamarche	Canada	40.20	+2.65

==== 1000 m ====
The race started on 13 November 2022 at 14:13.

Rank	Pair	Lane	Name	Country	Time	Diff
1st place, gold medalist(s)	9	i	Jutta Leerdam	Netherlands	1:15.61	
2nd place, silver medalist(s)	7	o	Kim Min-sun	South Korea	1:15.82	+0.21
3rd place, bronze medalist(s)	9	o	Miho Takagi	Japan	1:16.41	+0.80
4	8	i	Li Qishi	China	1:16.93	+1.32
5	5	o	Antoinette Rijpma-de Jong	Netherlands	1:16.94	+1.33
6	10	i	Kimi Goetz	United States	1:17.15	+1.54
7	5	i	Marrit Fledderus	Netherlands	1:17.17	+1.56
8	4	o	Michelle de Jong	Netherlands	1:17.31	+1.70
9	6	i	Karolina Bosiek	Poland	1:17.67	+2.06
10	2	i	Kim Hyun-Yung	South Korea	1:17.82	+2.21
11	8	o	Andżelika Wójcik	Poland	1:18.18	+2.57
12	2	o	Ivanie Blondin	Canada	1:18.26	+2.65
13	4	i	Erin Jackson	United States	1:18.36	+2.75
14	10	o	Yekaterina Aydova	Kazakhstan	1:18.56	+2.95
15	6	o	Han Mei	China	1:18.98	+3.37
16	3	i	Alexa Scott	Canada	1:19.13	+3.52
17	7	i	Jin Jingzhu	China	1:19.44	+3.83
18	3	o	Kako Yamane	Japan	1:19.71	+4.10
19	1	o	Sumire Kikuchi	Japan	1:19.79	+4.18
20	1	i	Natalia Jabrzyk	Poland	1:19.90	+4.29

==== 1500 m ====
The race started on 12 November 2022 at 13:00.

Rank	Pair	Lane	Name	Country	Time	Diff
1st place, gold medalist(s)	10	i	Miho Takagi	Japan	1:56.55	
2nd place, silver medalist(s)	8	i	Ragne Wiklund	Norway	1:57.49	+0.94
3rd place, bronze medalist(s)	5	o	Marijke Groenewoud	Netherlands	1:58.19	+1.64
4	8	o	Ivanie Blondin	Canada	1:58.25	+1.70
5	9	o	Antoinette Rijpma-de Jong	Netherlands	1:58.52	+1.97
6	10	o	Nadezhda Morozova	Kazakhstan	1:58.85	+2.30
7	7	o	Joy Beune	Netherlands	1:58.87	+2.32
8	5	i	Li Qishi	China	1:59.18	+2.63
9	9	i	Ayano Sato	Japan	1:59.38	+2.83
10	6	i	Jutta Leerdam	Netherlands	1:59.56	+3.01
11	7	i	Han Mei	China	2:00.49	+3.94
12	4	i	Kimi Goetz	United States	2:00.74	+4.19
13	2	i	Martina Sábliková	Czech Republic	2:00.80	+4.25
14	6	o	Isabelle Weidemann	Canada	2:00.81	+4.26
15	3	o	Karolina Bosiek	Poland	2:01.55	+5.00
16	2	o	Momoka Horikawa	Japan	2:02.83	+6.28
17	4	o	Yekaterina Aydova	Kazakhstan	2:03.02	+6.47
18	3	i	Alexa Scott	Canada	2:03.27	+6.72
19	1	o	Shione Kaminaga	Japan	2:03.87	+7.32
20	1	i	Laura Peveri	Italy	2:05.81	+9.26

==== 3000 m ====
The race started on 11 November 2022 at 18:20.

Rank	Pair	Lane	Name	Country	Time	Diff
1st place, gold medalist(s)	6	i	Ragne Wiklund	Norway	4:03.11	
2nd place, silver medalist(s)	7	o	Irene Schouten	Netherlands	4:05.01	+1.90
3rd place, bronze medalist(s)	6	o	Isabelle Weidemann	Canada	4:05.46	+2.35
4	3	o	Marijke Groenewoud	Netherlands	4:06.33	+3.22
5	8	i	Martina Sábliková	Czech Republic	4:08.32	+5.21
6	8	o	Antoinette Rijpma-de Jong	Netherlands	4:09.86	+6.75
7	7	i	Ivanie Blondin	Canada	4:10.24	+7.13
8	5	i	Joy Beune	Netherlands	4:11.44	+8.33
9	4	i	Valérie Maltais	Canada	4:11.55	+8.44
10	3	i	Ayano Sato	Japan	4:12.51	+9.40
11	4	o	Nadezhda Morozova	Kazakhstan	4:13.75	+10.64
12	1	i	Momoka Horikawa	Japan	4:15.60	+12.49
13	5	o	Han Mei	China	4:15.92	+12.81
14	2	i	Merel Conijn	Netherlands	4:17.13	+14.02
15	1	o	Laura Peveri	Italy	4:21.68	+18.57
16	2	o	Claudia Pechstein	Germany	4:26.55	+23.44

==== Mass start ====
The race started on 13 November 2022 at 15:31.

Rank	Name	Country	Points	Time
1st place, gold medalist(s)	Ivanie Blondin	Canada	61	8:58.72
2nd place, silver medalist(s)	Marijke Groenewoud	Netherlands	42	8:58.80
3rd place, bronze medalist(s)	Irene Schouten	Netherlands	20	8:59.05
4	Laura Peveri	Italy	10	8:59.37
5	Mia Kilburg	United States	6	8:59.59
6	Park Ji-woo	South Korea	3	9:00.64
7	Valérie Maltais	Canada	3	9:02.52
8	Sandrine Tas	Belgium	3	9:08.40
9	Momoka Horikawa	Japan	3	9:09.33
10	Ramona Härdi	Switzerland	3	9:11.16
11	Claudia Pechstein	Germany	2	9:09.20
12	Karolina Bosiek	Poland	1	9:09.76
13	Sumire Kikuchi	Japan		9:01.92
14	Michelle Uhrig	Germany		9:02.42
15	Yang Binyu	China		9:02.70
16	Giorgia Birkeland	United States		9:13.61

==== Team pursuit ====
The race started on 12 November 2022 at 15:34.

Rank	Pair	Lane	Country	Time	Diff
1st place, gold medalist(s)	5	s	Canada; Valérie Maltais; Ivanie Blondin; Isabelle Weidemann	3:01.81	
2nd place, silver medalist(s)	4	s	Netherlands; Antoinette Rijpma-de Jong; Irene Schouten; Marijke Groenewoud	3:02.29	+0.48
3rd place, bronze medalist(s)	5	c	Japan; Miho Takagi; Ayano Sato; Momoka Horikawa	3:02.90	+1.09
4	3	s	Poland; Olga Kaczmarek; Magdalena Czyszczoń; Karolina Bosiek	3:06.31	+4.50
5	2	c	China; Han Mei; Li Qishi; Yang Binyu	3:07.47	+5.66
6	3	c	United States; Mia Kilburg; Giorgia Birkeland; Greta Myers	3:08.97	+7.16
7	2	s	Germany; Josie Hofmann; Lea Sophie Scholz; Michelle Uhrig	3:11.75	+9.94
8	1	s	Kazakhstan; Nadezhda Morozova; Yekaterina Aydova; Alina Dauranova	3:12.78	+10.97
9	1	c	South Korea; Park Ji-woo; Hwang Hyan-sun; Lee Na-hyun	3:16.14	+14.33
	4	c	Norway; Aurora Løvås; Ragne Wiklund; Sofe Karoline Haugen	Did not finish	
