= 2020 World Single Distances Speed Skating Championships – Women's mass start =

Women's mass start at the 2020 World Single Distances Speed Skating Championships
- Venue: Utah Olympic Oval
- Location: Salt Lake City, United States
- Dates: February 16
- Competitors: 24 from 14 nations
- Winning points: 60

Medalists
gold medal	Ivanie Blondin	Canada
silver medal	Kim Bo-reum	South Korea
bronze medal	Irene Schouten	Netherlands

The Women's mass start competition at the 2020 World Single Distances Speed Skating Championships was held on February 16, 2020.

== Results ==
The race was started at 14:20. 16 laps were raced with four sprints.

Rank	Name	Country	Time	Points
1st place, gold medalist(s)	Ivanie Blondin	Canada	8:14.02	60
2nd place, silver medalist(s)	Kim Bo-reum	South Korea	8:14.22	40
3rd place, bronze medalist(s)	Irene Schouten	Netherlands	8:14.32	20
4	Nana Takagi	Japan	8:14.33	10
5	Francesca Lollobrigida	Italy	8:14.70	6
6	Valérie Maltais	Canada	8:19.63	5
7	Mia Kilburg-Manganello	United States	8:14.95	3
8	Maryna Zuyeva	Belarus	8:15.82	3
9	Claudia Pechstein	Germany	8:18.04	2
10	Karolina Bosiek	Poland	8:23.09	2
11	Melissa Wijfje	Netherlands	8:17.33	1
12	Park Ji-woo	South Korea	8:23.25	1
13	Karolina Gąsecka	Poland	8:34.06	0
14	Zhou Yang	China	8:15.01	0
15	Elena Sokhryakova	Russia	8:16.25	0
16	Yin Qi	China	8:16.34	0
17	Nadja Wenger	Switzerland	8:22.44	0
18	Tatsiana Mikhailava	Belarus	8:22.74	0
19	Saskia Alusalu	Estonia	8:23.74	0
20	Elizaveta Kazelina	Russia	8:37.19	0
21	Michelle Uhrig	Germany	8:14.85	0
22	Gemma Cooper	Great Britain	5:56.70	0
	Paige Schwartzburg	United States	Disqualified	
	Ayano Sato	Japan	Disqualified	
