= 2019 World Single Distances Speed Skating Championships – Women's mass start =

Women's mass start at the 2019 World Single Distances Speed Skating Championships
- Venue: Max Aicher Arena
- Location: Inzell, Germany
- Dates: 10 February
- Competitors: 24 from 14 nations
- Winning points: 60

Medalists
gold medal	Irene Schouten	Netherlands
silver medal	Ivanie Blondin	Canada
bronze medal	Elizaveta Kazelina	Russia

The Women's mass start competition at the 2019 World Single Distances Speed Skating Championships was held on 10 February 2019.

== Results ==
The race was started at 16:21.

Rank	Name	Country	Time	Points
1st place, gold medalist(s)	Irene Schouten	Netherlands	8:27.84	60
2nd place, silver medalist(s)	Ivanie Blondin	Canada	8:28.46	40
3rd place, bronze medalist(s)	Elizaveta Kazelina	Russia	8:29.29	20
4	Francesca Lollobrigida	Italy	8:29.54	10
5	Ayano Sato	Japan	8:29.66	6
6	Elena Rigas	Denmark	8:43.95	5
7	Yin Qi	China	8:50.24	5
8	Mia Kilburg-Manganello	United States	8:30.32	3
9	Magdalena Czyszczoń	Poland	8:51.89	3
10	Melissa Wijfje	Netherlands	8:32.08	2
11	Maryna Zuyeva	Belarus	8:32.54	2
12	Claudia Pechstein	Germany	8:36.00	1
13	Saskia Alusalu	Estonia	8:36.28	1
14	Fang Huiyan	China	8:30.64	
15	Nana Takagi	Japan	8:30.85	
16	Nikola Zdráhalová	Czech Republic	8:32.46	
17	Natálie Kerschbaummayr	Czech Republic	8:34.41	
18	Kimi Goetz	United States	8:36.46	
19	Roxanne Dufter	Germany	8:36.79	
20	Francesca Bettrone	Italy	8:38.46	
21	Park Ji-woo	South Korea	8:40.55	
22	Karolina Bosiek	Poland	8:48.88	
—	Valérie Maltais	Canada	Did not finish	
—	Kim Bo-reum	South Korea	Did not finish	
