= 2024 World Single Distances Speed Skating Championships – Women's 3000 metres =

Women's 3000 metres at the 2024 World Single Distances Speed Skating Championships
- Venue: Olympic Oval
- Location: Calgary, Canada
- Dates: February 15
- Competitors: 20 from 11 nations
- Winning time: 3:57.10

Medalists
gold medal	Irene Schouten	Netherlands
silver medal	Isabelle Weidemann	Canada
bronze medal	Martina Sáblíková	Czech Republic

The Women's 3000 metres competition at the 2024 World Single Distances Speed Skating Championships was held on February 15, 2024.

== Results ==
The race was started at 12:30.

Rank	Pair	Lane	Name	Country	Time	Diff
1st place, gold medalist(s)	10	i	Irene Schouten	Netherlands	3:57.10	
2nd place, silver medalist(s)	4	i	Isabelle Weidemann	Canada	3:58.01	+0.91
3rd place, bronze medalist(s)	8	o	Martina Sáblíková	Czech Republic	3:58.33	+1.23
4	9	i	Marijke Groenewoud	Netherlands	3:59.81	+2.71
5	8	i	Ragne Wiklund	Norway	3:59.84	+2.74
6	9	o	Ivanie Blondin	Canada	4:03.14	+6.04
7	7	o	Han Mei	China	4:03.73	+6.63
8	5	i	Yang Binyu	China	4:04.86	+7.76
9	6	i	Momoka Horikawa	Japan	4:06.07	+8.97
10	10	o	Valérie Maltais	Canada	4:06.17	+9.07
11	5	o	Elisa Dul	Netherlands	4:06.54	+9.44
12	7	i	Yuna Onodera	Japan	4:07.60	+10.50
13	2	i	Kaitlyn McGregor	Switzerland	4:07.68	+10.58
14	3	i	Mia Manganello	United States	4:08.99	+11.89
15	2	o	Greta Myers	United States	4:10.28	+13.18
16	1	i	Yuka Takahashi	Japan	4:10.73	+13.63
17	3	o	Sofie Karoline Haugen	Norway	4:11.00	+13.90
18	1	o	Laura Lorenzato	Italy	4:12.04	+14.94
19	6	o	Magdalena Czyszczoń	Poland	4:15.35	+18.25
20	4	o	Sandrine Tas	Belgium	4:16.59	+19.49
