= Speed skating at the 2026 Winter Olympics – Women's team pursuit =

Women's team pursuit at the XXV Olympic Winter Games
- Speed skating
- Venue: Milano Speed Skating Stadium, Milan
- Date: 14, 17 February 2026
- Competitors: 26 from 8 nations
- Teams: 8
- Winning time: 2:55.81

Medalists
| 1st place, gold medalist(s) | | Ivanie Blondin; Valérie Maltais; Isabelle Weidemann | Canada |
| 2nd place, silver medalist(s) | | Joy Beune; Marijke Groenewoud; Antoinette Rijpma-de Jong | Netherlands |
| 3rd place, bronze medalist(s) | | Momoka Horikawa; Hana Noake; Ayano Sato; Miho Takagi | Japan |

The women's team pursuit competition in speed skating at the 2026 Winter Olympics was held on 14 February (quarterfinals) and 17 February (semifinals and finals), at the Milano Speed Skating Stadium in Milan. Canada, represented by Ivanie Blondin, Valérie Maltais, and Isabelle Weidemann, won the event, successfully defending the title. The Netherlands were second, and Japan third.

== Background ==
Canada were the defending champion. Japan were the 2022 silver medalist, and the Netherlands the bronze medalist. Before the Olympics, Canada were leading the women's team pursuit standings of the 2025–26 ISU Speed Skating World Cup, followed by Japan and the United States. The Netherlands were the 2025 world champion.

== Records ==
Prior to this competition, the existing world, Olympic and track records were as follows.

| World record | Japan; Nana Takagi; Ayano Sato; Miho Takagi | 2:50.76 | Salt Lake City, United States | 14 February 2020 |
| Olympic record | Canada; Ivanie Blondin; Valérie Maltais; Isabelle Weidemann | 2:53.44 | Beijing, China | 15 February 2022 |
| Track record | Italy; Giulia Presti; Alice Marletti; Emily Tormen | 3:12.31 | | 29 November 2025 |

== Results ==
=== Quarterfinals ===
The quarterfinals were held on 14 February at 16:00.

| Rank | Heat | SP | Country | Time | Time behind | Notes |
|---|---|---|---|---|---|---|
| 1 | 4 | C | Canada; Ivanie Blondin; Valérie Maltais; Isabelle Weidemann | 2:55.03 | | SF1 |
| 2 | 2 | F | Japan; Momoka Horikawa; Ayano Sato; Miho Takagi | 2:55.52 | +0.49 | SF2 |
| 3 | 1 | C | Netherlands; Joy Beune; Marijke Groenewoud; Antoinette Rijpma-de Jong | 2:55.65 | +0.62 | SF2 |
| 4 | 3 | F | United States; Giorgia Birkeland; Brittany Bowe; Mia Manganello | 2:58.32 | +3.29 | SF1 |
| 5 | 3 | C | Germany; Josie Hofmann; Josephine Schlörb; Lea Sophie Scholz | 3:00.52 | +5.49 | FC |
| 6 | 4 | F | Belgium; Sandrine Tas; Isabelle van Elst; Fran Vanhoutte | 3:01.33 | +6.30 | FC |
| 7 | 2 | C | China; Ahenaer Adake; Han Mei; Li Jiaxuan | 3:01.42 | +6.39 | FD |
| | 1 | F | Kazakhstan; Elizaveta Golubeva; Arina Ilyachshenko; Nadezhda Morozova | Did not finish | | FD |

=== Semifinals ===
The semifinals were held on 17 February at 14:52.

| Rank | SP | Country | Time | Deficit | Notes |
|---|---|---|---|---|---|
Semifinal 1
| 1 | F | Canada; Ivanie Blondin; Valérie Maltais; Isabelle Weidemann | 2:55.92 | | FA |
| 2 | C | United States; Giorgia Birkeland; Brittany Bowe; Mia Manganello | 3:00.14 | +4.22 | FB |
Semifinal 2
| 1 | C | Netherlands; Joy Beune; Marijke Groenewoud; Antoinette Rijpma-de Jong | 2:55.84 | | FA |
| 2 | F | Japan; Momoka Horikawa; Ayano Sato; Miho Takagi | 2:55.95 | +0.11 | FB |

=== Finals ===
The finals were held on 17 February at 15:49.

| Rank | SP | Country | Time | Deficit | Notes |
|---|---|---|---|---|---|
Final A
| 1st place, gold medalist(s) | F | Canada; Ivanie Blondin; Valérie Maltais; Isabelle Weidemann | 2:55.81 | | |
| 2nd place, silver medalist(s) | C | Netherlands; Joy Beune; Marijke Groenewoud; Antoinette Rijpma-de Jong | 2:56.77 | +0.96 | |
Final B
| 3rd place, bronze medalist(s) | F | Japan; Hana Noake; Ayano Sato; Miho Takagi | 2:58.50 | | |
| 4 | C | United States; Brittany Bowe; Mia Manganello; Greta Myers | 3:02.00 | +3.50 | |
Final C
| 5 | F | Germany; Josie Hofmann; Josephine Schlörb; Lea Sophie Scholz | 3:00.65 | | |
| 6 | C | Belgium; Sandrine Tas; Isabelle van Elst; Fran Vanhoutte | 3:04.92 | +4.27 | |
Final D
| 7 | F | China | | | |
| 8 | C | Kazakhstan | Withdrawn | | |
