= 2017 World Allround Speed Skating Championships – Women =

Women at the 2017 World Allround Speed Skating Championships
- Venue: Vikingskipet
- Location: Hamar, Norway
- Dates: 4–5 March
- Competitors: 24 from 13 nations
- Winning time: 160.020

Medalists
gold medal	Ireen Wüst	Netherlands
silver medal	Martina Sáblíková	Czech Republic
bronze medal	Miho Takagi	Japan

The Women competition at the 2017 World Championships was held on 4 and 5 March 2017.

== Results ==
=== 500 m ===
The race was started on 4 March 2017 at 13:15.

Rank	Pair	Lane	Name	Country	Time	Diff
1	12	o	Miho Takagi	Japan	38.15	
2	12	i	Ireen Wüst	Netherlands	38.82	+0.67
3	11	o	Ida Njåtun	Norway	39.35	+1.20
4	10	o	Natalia Czerwonka	Poland	39.38	+1.23
4	11	i	Nana Takagi	Japan	39.38	+1.23
6	9	o	Ayano Sato	Japan	39.44	+1.29
7	9	i	Antoinette de Jong	Netherlands	39.56	+1.41
8	10	i	Ivanie Blondin	Canada	39.61	+1.46
9	6	o	Olga Graf	Russia	39.88	+1.73
10	7	i	Francesca Lollobrigida	Italy	40.01	+1.86
11	7	o	Luiza Złotkowska	Poland	40.02	+1.87
12	8	o	Nikola Zdráhalová	Czech Republic	40.07	+1.92
13	5	o	Martina Sáblíková	Czech Republic	40.11	+1.96
14	5	i	Natalya Voronina	Russia	40.22	+2.07
15	8	i	Marije Joling	Netherlands	40.23	+2.08
16	2	o	Bente Kraus	Germany	40.50	+2.35
17	6	i	Sofie Karoline Haugen	Norway	40.56	+2.41
18	1	o	Marina Zueva	Belarus	40.98	+2.83
19	2	i	Katarzyna Woźniak	Poland	41.01	+2.86
20	3	o	Anna Yurakova	Russia	41.20	+3.05
21	3	i	Jelena Peeters	Belgium	41.27	+3.12
22	1	i	Saskia Alusalu	Estonia	41.69	+3.54
23	4	i	Carlijn Schoutens	United States	41.73	+3.58
24	4	o	Camilla Lund	Norway	41.97	+3.82

=== 3000 m ===
The race was started on 4 March 2017 at 14:29.

Rank	Pair	Lane	Name	Country	Time	Diff
1	11	i	Martina Sáblíková	Czech Republic	4:02.21	
2	12	o	Ireen Wüst	Netherlands	4:03.71	+1.50
3	10	o	Antoinette de Jong	Netherlands	4:03.77	+1.56
4	7	o	Natalya Voronina	Russia	4:05.77	+3.56
5	12	i	Anna Yurakova	Russia	4:06.26	+4.05
6	10	i	Miho Takagi	Japan	4:06.52	+4.31
7	9	o	Olga Graf	Russia	4:06.96	+4.75
8	9	i	Marije Joling	Netherlands	4:07.91	+5.70
9	11	o	Ivanie Blondin	Canada	4:08.29	+6.08
10	6	o	Bente Kraus	Germany	4:08.36	+6.15
11	8	i	Ayano Sato	Japan	4:09.82	+7.61
12	5	i	Marina Zueva	Belarus	4:09.93	+7.72
13	3	i	Ida Njåtun	Norway	4:09.99	+7.78
14	6	i	Natalia Czerwonka	Poland	4:10.32	+8.11
15	2	o	Katarzyna Woźniak	Poland	4:11.59	+9.38
16	1	o	Nana Takagi	Japan	4:12.18	+9.97
17	5	o	Francesca Lollobrigida	Italy	4:12.20	+9.99
18	3	o	Luiza Złotkowska	Poland	4:12.88	+10.67
19	4	i	Jelena Peeters	Belgium	4:12.89	+10.68
20	4	o	Nikola Zdráhalová	Czech Republic	4:13.27	+11.06
21	8	o	Carlijn Schoutens	United States	4:14.81	+12.60
22	2	i	Saskia Alusalu	Estonia	4:17.75	+15.54
23	1	i	Sofie Karoline Haugen	Norway	4:18.71	+16.50
24	7	i	Camilla Lund	Norway	4:26.56	+24.35

=== 1500 m ===
The race was started on 5 March 2017 at 13:30.

Rank	Pair	Lane	Name	Country	Time	Diff
1	12	o	Ireen Wüst	Netherlands	1:55.49	
2	12	i	Miho Takagi	Japan	1:55.81	+0.32
3	11	o	Martina Sáblíková	Czech Republic	1:56.15	+0.66
4	9	i	Olga Graf	Russia	1:56.43	+0.94
5	11	i	Antoinette de Jong	Netherlands	1:56.77	+1.28
6	7	o	Marije Joling	Netherlands	1:57.14	+1.65
7	8	i	Natalia Czerwonka	Poland	1:57.21	+1.72
8	10	o	Ida Njåtun	Norway	1:57.72	+2.23
9	7	i	Nana Takagi	Japan	1:58.13	+2.64
10	9	o	Ayano Sato	Japan	1:58.25	+2.76
11	8	o	Natalya Voronina	Russia	1:58.39	+2.90
12	10	i	Ivanie Blondin	Canada	1:59.10	+3.61
13	5	o	Anna Yurakova	Russia	1:59.18	+3.69
14	6	o	Francesca Lollobrigida	Italy	1:59.43	+3.94
15	5	i	Luiza Złotkowska	Poland	1:59.91	+4.42
16	6	i	Bente Kraus	Germany	2:00.15	+4.66
17	3	i	Katarzyna Woźniak	Poland	2:00.39	+4.90
18	4	i	Nikola Zdráhalová	Czech Republic	2:00.71	+5.22
19	3	o	Jelena Peeters	Belgium	2:01.19	+5.70
20	2	i	Sofie Karoline Haugen	Norway	2:02.01	+6.52
21	4	o	Marina Zueva	Belarus	2:02.18	+6.69
22	1	i	Saskia Alusalu	Estonia	2:03.61	+8.12
23	2	o	Carlijn Schoutens	United States	2:03.77	+8.28
24	1	o	Camilla Lund	Norway	2:08.43	+12.94

=== 5000 m ===
The race was started on 5 March 2017 at 15:28.

Rank	Pair	Lane	Name	Country	Time	Diff
1	3	i	Martina Sáblíková	Czech Republic	6:54.57	
2	3	o	Ireen Wüst	Netherlands	7:00.86	+6.29
3	4	i	Antoinette de Jong	Netherlands	7:02.62	+8.05
4	1	o	Anna Yurakova	Russia	7:04.15	+9.58
5	1	i	Natalya Voronina	Russia	7:06.48	+11.91
6	4	o	Miho Takagi	Japan	7:10.14	+15.57
7	2	i	Olga Graf	Russia	7:12.17	+17.60
8	2	o	Natalia Czerwonka	Poland	7:19.58	+25.01

=== Overall standings ===
After all events.

Rank	Name	Country	Points	Diff
1st place, gold medalist(s)	Ireen Wüst	Netherlands	160.020	
2nd place, silver medalist(s)	Martina Sáblíková	Czech Republic	160.651	+0.64
3rd place, bronze medalist(s)	Miho Takagi	Japan	160.853	+0.84
4	Antoinette de Jong	Netherlands	161.373	+1.36
5	Olga Graf	Russia	163.067	+3.05
6	Natalya Voronina	Russia	163.292	+3.28
7	Natalia Czerwonka	Poland	164.128	+4.11
8	Anna Yurakova	Russia	164.384	+4.37
9	Ida Njåtun	Norway	120.255	
10	Ayano Sato	Japan	120.492	
11	Marije Joling	Netherlands	120.594	
12	Ivanie Blondin	Canada	120.691	
13	Nana Takagi	Japan	120.786	
14	Francesca Lollobrigida	Italy	121.853	
15	Bente Kraus	Germany	121.943	
16	Luiza Złotkowska	Poland	122.136	
17	Nikola Zdráhalová	Czech Republic	122.517	
18	Katarzyna Woźniak	Poland	123.071	
19	Marina Zueva	Belarus	123.361	
20	Jelena Peeters	Belgium	123.814	
21	Sofie Karoline Haugen	Norway	124.348	
22	Carlijn Schoutens	United States	125.454	
23	Saskia Alusalu	Estonia	125.851	
24	Camilla Lund	Norway	129.206	
