= Speed skating at the 2022 Winter Olympics – Women's team pursuit =

Speed skating event at the 2022 Winter Olympics

Women's team pursuit at the XXIV Olympic Winter Games
- Speed skating
- Venue: National Speed Skating Oval, Beijing
- Date: 12 and 15 February 2022
- Competitors: 25 from 8 nations
- Teams: 8
- Winning time: 2:53.44

Medalists
1st place, gold medalist(s)		Ivanie Blondin; Valérie Maltais; Isabelle Weidemann	Canada
2nd place, silver medalist(s)		Ayano Sato; Miho Takagi; Nana Takagi	Japan
3rd place, bronze medalist(s)		Antoinette de Jong; Marijke Groenewoud; Irene Schouten; Ireen Wüst	Netherlands

The women's team pursuit competition in speed skating at the 2022 Winter Olympics was held on 12 February (semifinals) and 15 February (final), at the National Speed Skating Oval ("Ice Ribbon") in Beijing. Ivanie Blondin, Valérie Maltais, and Isabelle Weidemann, representing Canada, won the event, setting an Olympic record in Final A. This was the first gold medal for Canada in this event and the first Canadian medal since 2006. Ayano Sato, Miho Takagi, and Nana Takagi of Japan set an Olympic record in the semifinals and eventually won the silver medal. Japan was leading during the final against Canada when Nana Takagi fell down with less than half a lap to go. Antoinette de Jong, Marijke Groenewoud, Irene Schouten, and Ireen Wüst, representing the Netherlands, won the bronze medal.

Japan were the defending champion and the world record holder at the beginning of the Olympics. The Netherlands and the United States were the 2018 silver and bronze medalist, respectively; however, Japan and the United States did not enter this year. The Netherlands are the 2021 World Single Distances champion in team pursuit, with Canada second and the Russian Skating Union third. Canada were leading the 2021–22 ISU Speed Skating World Cup after three events before the Olympics, ahead of Japan and the Netherlands.

== Qualification ==
A total of 8 team quotas were available for the event, with a maximum of one team per NOC. The top six countries qualified through their performance at the 2021–22 ISU Speed Skating World Cup, while the last two countries qualified through their time performance.

== Records ==
Prior to this competition, the existing world, Olympic and track records were as follows.

World record	Japan; Nana Takagi; Ayano Sato; Miho Takagi	2:50.76	Salt Lake City, United States	14 February 2020
Olympic record	Japan; Miho Takagi; Ayano Sato; Nana Takagi	2:53.89	Gangneung, South Korea	19 February 2018
Track record	Netherlands; Leonie Bats; Isabel Grevelt; Sophie Kraaijeveld	3:15.64		9 October 2021

The following records were set during this competition.

Date	Round	Athlete	Country	Time	Record
12 February	Quarterfinal 1	Ayano Sato; Miho Takagi; Nana Takagi	Japan	2:53.61	OR, TR
15 February	Final A	Ivanie Blondin; Valérie Maltais; Isabelle Weidemann	Canada	2:53.44	OR, TR

== Results ==
=== Quarterfinals ===
The quarterfinals were held on 12 February at 16:00.

Rank	Heat	SP	Country	Time	Time behind	Notes
1	1	C	Japan; Ayano Sato; Miho Takagi; Nana Takagi	2:53.61		OR, Semifinal 1
2	3	F	Canada; Ivanie Blondin; Valérie Maltais; Isabelle Weidemann	2:53.97	+0.36	Semifinal 2
3	2	F	Netherlands; Antoinette de Jong; Irene Schouten; Ireen Wüst	2:57.26	+3.65	Semifinal 2
4	4	F	ROC; Elizaveta Golubeva; Evgeniia Lalenkova; Natalya Voronina	2:57.66	+4.05	Semifinal 1
5	1	F	China; Ahenaer Adake; Han Mei; Li Qishi	3:00.58	+6.97	Final C
6	2	C	Norway; Marit Fjellanger Bøhm; Sofie Karoline Haugen; Ragne Wiklund	3:01.84	+8.23	Final C
7	4	C	Poland; Karolina Bosiek; Natalia Czerwonka; Magdalena Czyszczoń	3:01.92	+8.31	Final D
8	3	C	Belarus; Ekaterina Sloeva; Yauheniya Varabyova; Maryna Zuyeva	3:02.00	+8.39	Final D

=== Semifinals ===
The semifinals were held on 15 February at 14:30.

Rank	SP	Country	Time	Deficit	Notes
Semifinal 1
1	F	Japan; Ayano Sato; Miho Takagi; Nana Takagi	2:58.93	–	Final A
2	C	ROC; Elizaveta Golubeva; Evgeniia Lalenkova; Natalya Voronina	3:05.92	+6.99	Final B
Semifinal 2
1	F	Canada; Ivanie Blondin; Valérie Maltais; Isabelle Weidemann	2:54.96	–	Final A
2	C	Netherlands; Antoinette de Jong; Irene Schouten; Ireen Wüst	2:55.94	+0.98	Final B

=== Finals ===
The finals were held on 15 February at 15:24.

Rank	SP	Country	Time	Deficit	Notes
Final A
1st place, gold medalist(s)	C	Canada; Ivanie Blondin; Valérie Maltais; Isabelle Weidemann	2:53.44	–	OR
2nd place, silver medalist(s)	F	Japan; Ayano Sato; Miho Takagi; Nana Takagi	3:04.47	+11.03	Nana Takagi fell in final lap
Final B
3rd place, bronze medalist(s)	F	Netherlands; Marijke Groenewoud; Irene Schouten; Ireen Wüst	2:56.86	–	
4	C	ROC; Elizaveta Golubeva; Evgeniia Lalenkova; Natalya Voronina	2:58.66	+1.80	
Final C
5	F	China; Ahenaer Adake; Han Mei; Li Qishi	2:58.33	–	
6	C	Norway; Marit Fjellanger Bøhm; Sofie Karoline Haugen; Ragne Wiklund	3:02.15	+3.82	
Final D
7	C	Belarus; Ekaterina Sloeva; Yauheniya Varabyova; Maryna Zuyeva	3:01.19	–	
8	F	Poland; Karolina Bosiek; Natalia Czerwonka; Magdalena Czyszczoń	3:03.19	+2.00	
