= World record progression team pursuit speed skating women =

The world record progression of the women's speed skating team pursuit over six laps as recognised by the International Skating Union:

Country	Team	Time	Date	Event	Place	Ref
Canada	Kristina Groves; Clara Hughes; Cindy Klassen	3:05.49	14 November 2004	World Cup	Hamar, Norway	
Canada	Kristina Groves; Clara Hughes; Cindy Klassen	3:03.07	21 November 2004	World Cup	Berlin, Germany	
Germany	Anni Friesinger; Daniela Anschütz; Claudia Pechstein	2:56.04	13 November 2005	World Cup	Calgary, Canada	
Canada	Kristina Groves; Christine Nesbitt; Brittany Schussler	2:55.79	6 December 2009	World Cup	Calgary, Canada	
Japan	Ayano Sato; Miho Takagi; Nana Takagi	2:55.77	10 November 2017	World Cup	Heerenveen, Netherlands	
Japan	Ayaka Kikuchi; Miho Takagi; Nana Takagi	2:53.88	2 December 2017	World Cup	Calgary, Canada	
Japan	Ayano Sato; Miho Takagi; Nana Takagi	2:50.87	8 December 2017	World Cup	Salt Lake City, United States	
Japan	Nana Takagi; Ayano Sato; Miho Takagi	2:50.76	14 February 2020	World Single Distances Championships	Salt Lake City, United States	
