= Yin Qi (speed skater) =

Chinese speed skater (born 1992)

Personal information
- Born: 15 October 1992 (age 33) Harbin, China

Sport
- Country: China
- Sport: Speed skating
Medal record
Women's speed skating
Representing China
Asian Winter Games
Silver medal – second place	2025 Harbin	1000 m
Bronze medal – third place	2025 Harbin	1500 m

Yin Qi (Chinese: 殷琦; born 15 October 1992) is a Chinese long track speed skater.

Qi participated in the 2019 World Single Distance Speed Skating Championships, in the team pursuit event and mass start event, and at the 2020 World Single Distance Speed Skating Championships in the 1500 metres event and 5000 mass start. At the end of the season, she also participated at the 2020 World Allround Speed Skating Championships, finishing 16th overall. She also competes at other international competitions, including at ISU Speed Skating World Cups.

As of 2020, she had been the national champion twice. In 2019 she won the mass start and the team pursuit at the Chinese national championships.

At the 2022 Winter Olympics, she finished 15th in the 1500 metres.

== Records ==
=== Personal records ===
Personal records
Speed skating
Event	Result	Date	Location	Notes
500 m	39,48	29.02.2020	Vikingskipet, Hamar	
1000 m	1.13,81	22.11.2025	Olympic Oval, Calgary	
1500 m	1.55,49	16.02.2020	Utah Olympic Oval, Salt Lake City	
3000 m	4.06,35	07.02.2020	Olympic Oval, Calgary	
5000 m	7.15,43	16.03.2019	Olympic Oval, Calgary	
