= 2021 World Single Distances Speed Skating Championships – Women's team pursuit =

Women's team pursuit at the 2021 World Single Distances Speed Skating Championships
- Venue: Thialf
- Location: Heerenveen, Netherlands
- Date: 12 February
- Competitors: 24 from 8 nations
- Teams: 8
- Winning time: 2:55.795

Medalists
gold medal	Ireen Wüst; Antoinette de Jong; Irene Schouten	Netherlands
silver medal	Valérie Maltais; Ivanie Blondin; Isabelle Weidemann	Canada
bronze medal	Evgeniia Lalenkova; Elizaveta Golubeva; Natalya Voronina

The Women's team pursuit competition at the 2021 World Single Distances Speed Skating Championships was held on 12 February 2021.

== Results ==
The race was started at 15:10.

Rank	Pair	Lane	Country	Time	Diff
1st place, gold medalist(s)	4	s	Netherlands; Ireen Wüst; Antoinette de Jong; Irene Schouten	2:55.795	
2nd place, silver medalist(s)	4	c	Canada; Valérie Maltais; Ivanie Blondin; Isabelle Weidemann	2:55.973	+0.17
3rd place, bronze medalist(s)	3	c	Russian Skating Union; Evgeniia Lalenkova; Elizaveta Golubeva; Natalya Voronina	2:59.358	+3.56
4	3	s	Norway; Ragne Wiklund; Ida Njåtun; Marit Fjellanger Bøhm	2:59.631	+3.83
5	1	c	Poland; Natalia Czerwonka; Karolina Bosiek; Magdalena Czyszczoń	3:00.672	+4.96
6	2	s	Belarus; Maryna Zuyeva; Ekaterina Sloeva; Yauheniya Varabyova	3:03.127	+7.33
7	2	c	Switzerland; Nadja Wenger; Kaitlyn McGregor; Ramona Härdi	3:06.260	+10.46
8	1	s	Germany; Josephine Heimerl; Claudia Pechstein; Mareike Thum	3:17.103	+21.30
