= Momoka Horikawa =

Japanese speed skater (born 2003)

Personal information
- Born: 10 July 2003 (age 22) Taiki, Japan
- Height: 1.64 m (5 ft 5 in)

Sport
- Country: Japan
- Sport: Speed skating
- Event(s): 3000 m, 5000 m, team pursuit
Medal record
Women's speed skating
Representing Japan
Olympic Games
Bronze medal – third place	2026 Milano Cortina	Team pursuit
World Single Distances Championships
Silver medal – second place	2023 Heerenveen	Team pursuit
Silver medal – second place	2025 Hamar	Team pursuit
Bronze medal – third place	2024 Calgary	Team pursuit
Four Continents Championships
Gold medal – first place	2025 Hachinohe	3000 m
Silver medal – second place	2024 Salt Lake City	Team pursuit

Momoka Horikawa (堀川桃香, Horikawa Momoka; born 10 July 2003) is a Japanese speed skater who represented Japan at the 2022 Winter Olympics.

== Career ==
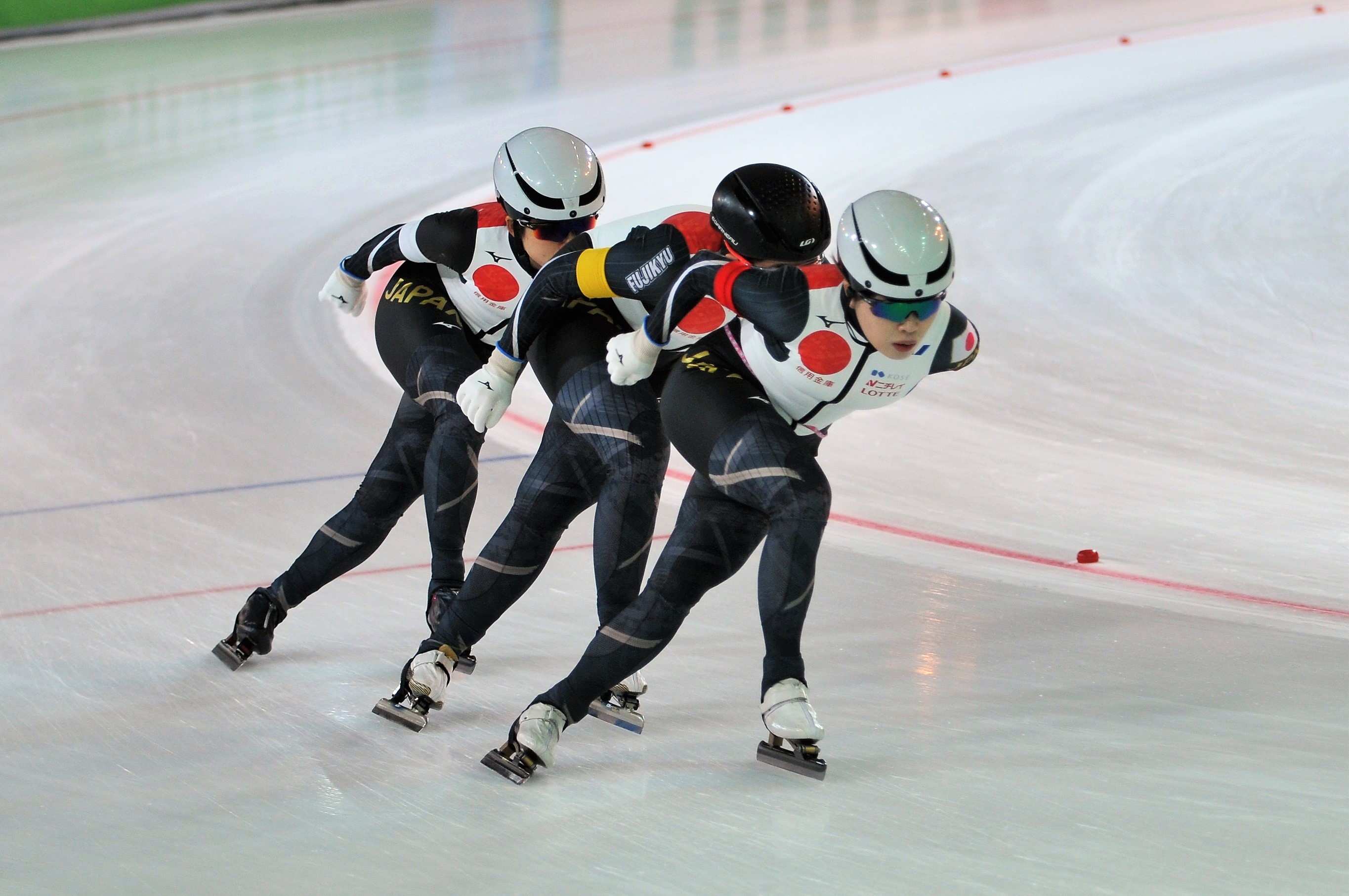
Horikawa (yellow armband) with team pursuit teammates Miho Takagi (white) and Ayano Sato (red) in 2022.

Horikawa represented Japan at the 2022 Winter Olympics and finished in tenth place in the 5000 metres.

In February 2023, Horikawa competed at the 2023 World Junior Speed Skating Championships and won a gold medal in the 3000 metres. The next month she competed at the 2023 World Single Distances Speed Skating Championships and won a silver medal in the team pursuit with a time of 2:57.30.

In January 2024, she competed at the 2024 Four Continents Speed Skating Championships and won a silver medal in the team pursuit. The next month she competed at the 2024 World Single Distances Speed Skating Championships and won a bronze medal in the team pursuit with a time of 2:54.89. In November 2024, she competed at the 2025 Four Continents Speed Skating Championships and won a gold medal in the 3000 metres with a time of 4:06.91.

In March 2025, she competed at the 2025 World Single Distances Speed Skating Championships and won a silver medal in the team pursuit with a time of 2:58.55. She also competed in the 3000 metres and finished in 12th place.
