= List of Slovak records in speed skating =

The following are the national records in speed skating in Slovakia, maintained by Slovak Speed Skating Union.

== Men ==
Event	Record	Athlete	Date	Meet	Place	Ref
500 meters	37.87	Jakub Klembara	9 March 2018		Salt Lake City, United States	
500 meters × 2						
1000 meters	1:13.94	Lukáš Steklý	2 November 2024		Inzell, Germany	
1500 meters	1:49.38	Lukáš Steklý	22 November 2025	World Cup	Calgary, Canada	
3000 meters	3:46.77	Lukáš Steklý	21 February 2026	Junior World Cup	Inzell, Germany	
5000 meters	6:32.67	Lukáš Steklý	14 November 2025	World Cup	Salt Lake City, United States	
10000 meters	13:32.05	Lukáš Steklý	6 December 2025	World Cup	Heerenveen, Netherlands	
Team pursuit (8 laps)						
Sprint combination						
Small combination						
Big combination						

== Women ==
Event	Record	Athlete	Date	Meet	Place	Ref
500 meters	44.42	Jamie Jurák	27 September 2025	Time Trials	Salt Lake City, United States	
500 meters × 2						
1000 meters	1:29.34	Zoja Onušková	1 November 2025	Frillensee Cup	Inzell, Germany	
1500 meters	2:09.54	Jamie Jurák	27 September 2025	Time Trials	Salt Lake City, United States	
3000 meters	4:35.50	Jamie Jurák	12 November 2025	Time Trials	Salt Lake City, United States	
5000 meters	8:55.22	Jana Vodičková	27 February 2016		Erfurt, Germany	
10000 meters						
Team pursuit (6 laps)						
Sprint combination						
Mini combination						
Small combination						
