= 2019 World Single Distances Speed Skating Championships – Women's team pursuit =

Women's team pursuit at the 2019 World Single Distances Speed Skating Championships
- Venue: Max Aicher Arena
- Location: Inzell, Germany
- Dates: 8 February
- Competitors: 24 from 8 nations
- Teams: 8
- Winning time: 2:55.78

Medalists
| gold medal | Ayano Sato; Miho Takagi; Nana Takagi | Japan |
| silver medal | Joy Beune; Antoinette de Jong; Ireen Wüst | Netherlands |
| bronze medal | Elizaveta Kazelina; Evgeniia Lalenkova; Natalya Voronina | Russia |

The Women's team pursuit competition at the 2019 World Single Distances Speed Skating Championships was held on 8 February 2019.

== Results ==
The race was started at 17:31.

| Rank | Pair | Lane | Country | Time | Diff |
|---|---|---|---|---|---|
| 1st place, gold medalist(s) | 4 | c | Japan | 2:55.78 | |
| 2nd place, silver medalist(s) | 3 | c | Netherlands | 2:56.20 | +0.42 |
| 3rd place, bronze medalist(s) | 4 | s | Russia | 2:57.72 | +1.94 |
| 4 | 3 | s | Canada | 2:58.30 | +2.52 |
| 5 | 2 | s | China | 3:04.07 | +8.29 |
| 6 | 1 | s | Poland | 3:05.33 | +9.55 |
| 7 | 2 | c | United States | 3:06.00 | +10.22 |
| 8 | 1 | c | Italy | 3:07.87 | +12.09 |
