= 2023 World Single Distances Speed Skating Championships – Women's team pursuit =

Women's team pursuit at the 2023 World Single Distances Speed Skating Championships
- Venue: Thialf
- Location: Heerenveen, Netherlands
- Date: 3 March
- Competitors: 24 from 8 nations
- Teams: 8
- Winning time: 2:54.58

Medalists
gold medal	Valérie Maltais; Ivanie Blondin; Isabelle Weidemann	Canada
silver medal	Momoka Horikawa; Ayano Sato; Sumire Kikuchi	Japan
bronze medal	Mia Kilburg; Giorgia Birkeland; Brittany Bowe	United States

The Women's team pursuit competition at the 2023 World Single Distances Speed Skating Championships was held on 3 March 2023.

== Results ==
The race was started at 19:05.

Rank	Pair	Lane	Country	Time	Diff
1st place, gold medalist(s)	3	s	Canada; Valérie Maltais; Ivanie Blondin; Isabelle Weidemann	2:54.58	
2nd place, silver medalist(s)	4	c	Japan; Momoka Horikawa; Ayano Sato; Sumire Kikuchi	2:57.30	+2.72
3rd place, bronze medalist(s)	3	c	United States; Mia Kilburg; Giorgia Birkeland; Brittany Bowe	3:00.39	+5.81
4	2	s	China; Han Mei; Li Qishi; Chen Aoyu	3:00.99	+6.41
5	1	c	Norway; Aurora Løvås; Ragne Wiklund; Sofie Karoline Haugen	3:01.13	+6.55
6	2	c	Poland; Karolina Bosiek; Magdalena Czyszczoń; Olga Kaczmarek	3:03.84	+9.26
7	1	s	Germany; Lea Sophie Scholz; Michelle Uhrig; Josie Hofmann	3:08.88	+14.30
	4	s	Netherlands; Joy Beune; Irene Schouten; Marijke Groenewoud	Disqualified	
