= 2024 World Single Distances Speed Skating Championships – Women's team pursuit =

Women's team pursuit at the 2024 World Single Distances Speed Skating Championships
- Venue: Olympic Oval
- Location: Calgary, Canada
- Dates: February 16
- Competitors: 24 from 8 nations
- Teams: 8
- Winning time: 2:51.20

Medalists
gold medal	Joy Beune; Irene Schouten; Marijke Groenewoud	Netherlands
silver medal	Valérie Maltais; Ivanie Blondin; Isabelle Weidemann	Canada
bronze medal	Momoka Horikawa; Ayano Sato; Miho Takagi	Japan

The Women's team pursuit competition at the 2024 World Single Distances Speed Skating Championships was held on February 16, 2024.

== Results ==
The race was started at 12:30.

Rank	Pair	Lane	Country	Time	Diff
1st place, gold medalist(s)	1	c	Netherlands; Joy Beune; Irene Schouten; Marijke Groenewoud	2:51.20	
2nd place, silver medalist(s)	3	s	Canada; Valérie Maltais; Ivanie Blondin; Isabelle Weidemann	2:54.03	+2.83
3rd place, bronze medalist(s)	4	s	Japan; Momoka Horikawa; Ayano Sato; Miho Takagi	2:54.89	+3.69
4	3	c	United States; Brittany Bowe; Mia Manganello; Giorgia Birkeland	2:57.80	+6.60
5	1	s	China; Han Mei; Yang Binyu; Jin Wenjing	2:59.57	+8.37
6	2	s	Germany; Lea Sophie Scholz; Josephine Schlörb; Josie Hofmann	2:59.72	+8.52
7	4	c	Poland; Natalia Jabrzyk; Karolina Bosiek; Magdalena Czyszczoń	3:00.58	+9.38
8	2	c	Switzerland; Jasmin Güntert; Kaitlyn McGregor; Ramona Härdi	3:00.86	+9.66
