= 2020 World Single Distances Speed Skating Championships – Women's team pursuit =

Women's team pursuit at the 2020 World Single Distances Speed Skating Championships
- Venue: Utah Olympic Oval
- Location: Salt Lake City, United States
- Dates: February 14
- Competitors: 21 from 7 nations
- Teams: 7
- Winning time: 2:50.76

Medalists
gold medal	Nana Takagi; Ayano Sato; Miho Takagi	Japan
silver medal	Melissa Wijfje; Ireen Wüst; Antoinette de Jong	Netherlands
bronze medal	Ivanie Blondin; Valérie Maltais; Isabelle Weidemann	Canada

The Women's team pursuit competition at the 2020 World Single Distances Speed Skating Championships was held on February 14, 2020.

== Results ==
The race was started at 16:01.

Rank	Pair	Lane	Country	Time	Diff
1st place, gold medalist(s)	3	c	Japan; Nana Takagi; Ayano Sato; Miho Takagi	2:50.76 WR	
2nd place, silver medalist(s)	4	s	Netherlands; Melissa Wijfje; Ireen Wüst; Antoinette de Jong	2:52.65	+1.89
3rd place, bronze medalist(s)	4	c	Canada; Ivanie Blondin; Valérie Maltais; Isabelle Weidemann	2:53.62	+2.86
4	3	s	Russia; Elizaveta Kazelina; Evgeniia Lalenkova; Natalia Voronina	2:53.92	+3.16
5	2	s	Poland; Karolina Bosiek; Natalia Czerwonka; Karolina Gąsecka	2:59.24	+8.48
6	2	c	United States; Brianna Bocox; Mia Kilburg; Paige Schwartzburg	2:59.79	+9.03
7	1	s	China; Li Dan; Tao Jiaying; Zhou Yang	3:01.57	+10.81
