= Camilla Lund =

Norwegian speed skater (born 1994)

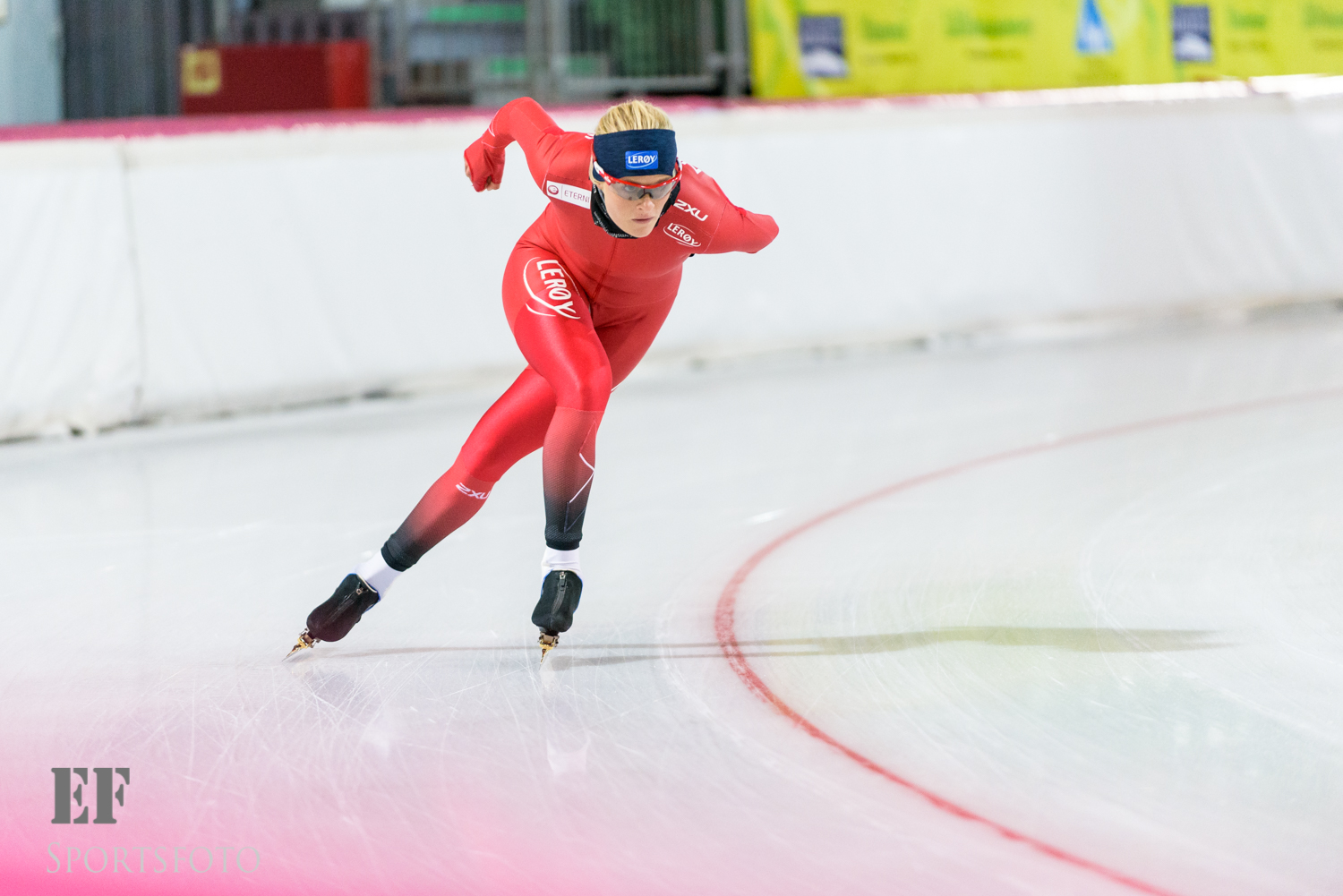

Personal information
- Nationality: Norwegian
- Born: 12 November 1994 (age 30)

Sport
- Country: Norway
- Sport: Speed skating

Camilla Lund (born 12 November 1994) is a Norwegian speed skater. She competed in the World Allround Speed Skating Championships in 2017, and at the 2018 European Speed Skating Championships in Kolomna, Russia. She became Norwegian champion on 5000 m in 2016.
