= 2025 World Single Distances Speed Skating Championships – Women's team pursuit =

Women's team pursuit at the 2025 World Single Distances Speed Skating Championships
- Venue: Vikingskipet
- Location: Hamar, Norway
- Dates: 14 March
- Competitors: 24 from 8 nations
- Teams: 8
- Winning time: 2:56.09

Medalists
gold medal	Joy Beune; Antoinette Rijpma-de Jong; Marijke Groenewoud	Netherlands
silver medal	Miho Takagi; Ayano Sato; Momoka Horikawa	Japan
bronze medal	Ivanie Blondin; Valérie Maltais; Isabelle Weidemann	Canada

The Women's team pursuit competition at the 2025 World Single Distances Speed Skating Championships took place on 14 March 2025.

== Qualification ==
A total of eight entry quotas were available for the event, with a maximum of one per country. The entry quotas were assigned to countries following a Special Qualification Ranking List based on points and times during the 2024–25 ISU Speed Skating World Cup.

== Records ==
Prior to this competition, the existing world and track records were as follows.

	Time	Team	Date
World Record	2:50.76	Japan	14 February 2020
Track Record	3:00.90	Canada	28 November 2010

== Results ==
The race was started at 19:00.

Rank	Pair	Lane	Country	Time	Diff
1st place, gold medalist(s)	4	c	Netherlands; Joy Beune; Antoinette Rijpma-de Jong; Marijke Groenewoud	2:56.09; TR	
2nd place, silver medalist(s)	3	s	Japan; Miho Takagi; Ayano Sato; Momoka Horikawa	2:58.55	+2.46
3rd place, bronze medalist(s)	1	s	Canada; Ivanie Blondin; Valérie Maltais; Isabelle Weidemann	3:00.74	+4.65
4	4	s	Germany; Lea Sophie Scholz; Josephine Schlörb; Josie Hofmann	3:01.27	+5.18
5	3	c	United States; Brittany Bowe; Mia Manganello; Greta Myers	3:02.25	+6.16
6	2	c	Norway; Ragne Wiklund; Aurora Grinden Løvås; Hanna Svenni	3:03.98	+7.89
7	1	c	China; Yang Binyu; Ahenaer Adake; Jin Wenjing	3:06.54	+10.45
8	2	s	Italy; Francesca Lollobrigida; Giorgia Aiello; Alice Marletti	3:07.45	+11.36
