= 2025 World Single Distances Speed Skating Championships =

Speed skating event in Hamar, Norway

- Venue: Vikingskipet, Hamar, Norway
- Dates: 13–16 March

The 2025 World Single Distances Speed Skating Championships took place from 13 to 16 March 2025, at the Vikingskipet in Hamar, Norway.

== Schedule ==
All times are local (UTC+1).

| Date | Time | Events |
|---|---|---|
| 13 March | 18:00 | 3000 m women |
| 13 March | 19:11 | 5000 m men |
| 13 March | 20:57 | Team sprint women |
| 13 March | 21:14 | Team sprint men |
| 14 March | 19:00 | Team pursuit women |
| 14 March | 19:25 | Team pursuit men |
| 14 March | 20:07 | 500 m women |
| 14 March | 20:46 | 500 m men |
| 15 March | 14:00 | 1000 m women |
| 15 March | 14:45 | 1000 m men |
| 15 March | 15:37 | 5000 m women |
| 15 March | 16:48 | Mass start men |
| 16 March | 12:00 | 1500 m men |
| 16 March | 12:56 | 1500 m women |
| 16 March | 13:53 | 10.000 m men |
| 16 March | 15:58 | Mass start women |

== Medal summary ==
=== Medal table ===
* Host nation (Norway)

| Rank | Nation | Gold | Silver | Bronze | Total |
|---|---|---|---|---|---|
| 1 | Netherlands | 8 | 6 | 4 | 18 |
| 2 | Italy | 3 | 1 | 1 | 5 |
| 3 | Norway* | 2 | 1 | 0 | 3 |
| 4 | United States | 1 | 2 | 3 | 6 |
| 5 | Japan | 1 | 1 | 0 | 2 |
| 6 | China | 1 | 0 | 1 | 2 |
| 7 | Canada | 0 | 2 | 2 | 4 |
| 8 | Poland | 0 | 1 | 2 | 3 |
| 9 | Czech Republic | 0 | 1 | 1 | 2 |
| 9 | South Korea | 0 | 1 | 1 | 2 |
| 11 | Belgium | 0 | 0 | 1 | 1 |
| Totals (11 entries) | | 16 | 16 | 16 | 48 |

=== Men's events ===
| Event | Gold | | Silver | | Bronze | |
|---|---|---|---|---|---|---|
| 500 m | Jenning de Boo; Netherlands | 34.24; TR | Jordan Stolz; United States | 34.38 | Cooper McLeod; United States | 34.52 |
| 1000 m | Joep Wennemars; Netherlands | 1:08.05; TR | Jenning de Boo; Netherlands | 1:08.21 | Jordan Stolz; United States | 1:08.26 |
| 1500 m | Peder Kongshaug; Norway | 1:44.64 | Jordan Stolz; United States | 1:44.71 | Connor Howe; Canada | 1:44.78 |
| 5000 m | Sander Eitrem; Norway | 6:10.05 | Beau Snellink; Netherlands | 6:11.71 | Vladimir Semirunniy; Poland | 6:12.95 |
| 10000 m | Davide Ghiotto; Italy | 12:46.15 | Vladimir Semirunniy; Poland | 12:49.93 | Metoděj Jílek; Czech Republic | 12:51.53 |
| Team sprint | China; Xue Zhiwen; Lian Ziwen; Ning Zhongyan | 1:18.13; TR | Netherlands; Janno Botman; Jenning de Boo; Tim Prins | 1:18.42 | United States; Austin Kleba; Cooper McLeod; Zach Stoppelmoor | 1:19.23 |
| Team pursuit | United States; Casey Dawson; Emery Lehman; Ethan Cepuran | 3:39.24; TR | Italy; Davide Ghiotto; Michele Malfatti; Andrea Giovannini | 3:41.17 | Netherlands; Chris Huizinga; Beau Snellink; Marcel Bosker | 3:41.91 |
| Mass start | Andrea Giovannini; Italy | 60 pts | Lee Seung-hoon; South Korea | 40 pts | Bart Swings; Belgium | 20 pts |

=== Women's events ===
| Event | Gold | | Silver | | Bronze | |
|---|---|---|---|---|---|---|
| 500 m | Femke Kok; Netherlands | 37.50 | Jutta Leerdam; Netherlands | 37.69 | Kim Min-sun; South Korea | 37.73 |
| 1000 m | Miho Takagi; Japan | 1:14.75 | Femke Kok; Netherlands | 1:14.98 | Jutta Leerdam; Netherlands | 1:15.05 |
| 1500 m | Joy Beune; Netherlands | 1:55.28 | Antoinette Rijpma-de Jong; Netherlands | 1:55.50 | Han Mei; China | 1:55.53 |
| 3000 m | Joy Beune; Netherlands | 4:00.39 | Martina Sáblíková; Czech Republic | 4:00.57 | Merel Conijn; Netherlands | 4:01.22 |
| 5000 m | Francesca Lollobrigida; Italy | 6:56.38 | Ragne Wiklund; Norway | 6:56.56 | Merel Conijn; Netherlands | 6:58.49 |
| Team sprint | Netherlands; Jutta Leerdam; Suzanne Schulting; Angel Daleman | 1:25.57; TR | Canada; Brooklyn McDougall; Béatrice Lamarche; Ivanie Blondin | 1:27.23 | Poland; Andżelika Wójcik; Kaja Ziomek-Nogal; Karolina Bosiek | 1:27.80 |
| Team pursuit | Netherlands; Joy Beune; Antoinette Rijpma-de Jong; Marijke Groenewoud | 2:56.09; TR | Japan; Miho Takagi; Ayano Sato; Momoka Horikawa | 2:58.55 | Canada; Ivanie Blondin; Valérie Maltais; Isabelle Weidemann | 3:00.74 |
| Mass start | Marijke Groenewoud; Netherlands | 60 pts | Ivanie Blondin; Canada | 40 pts | Francesca Lollobrigida; Italy | 20 pts |
