= Miho Takagi (speed skater) =

Japanese speed skater (born 1994)

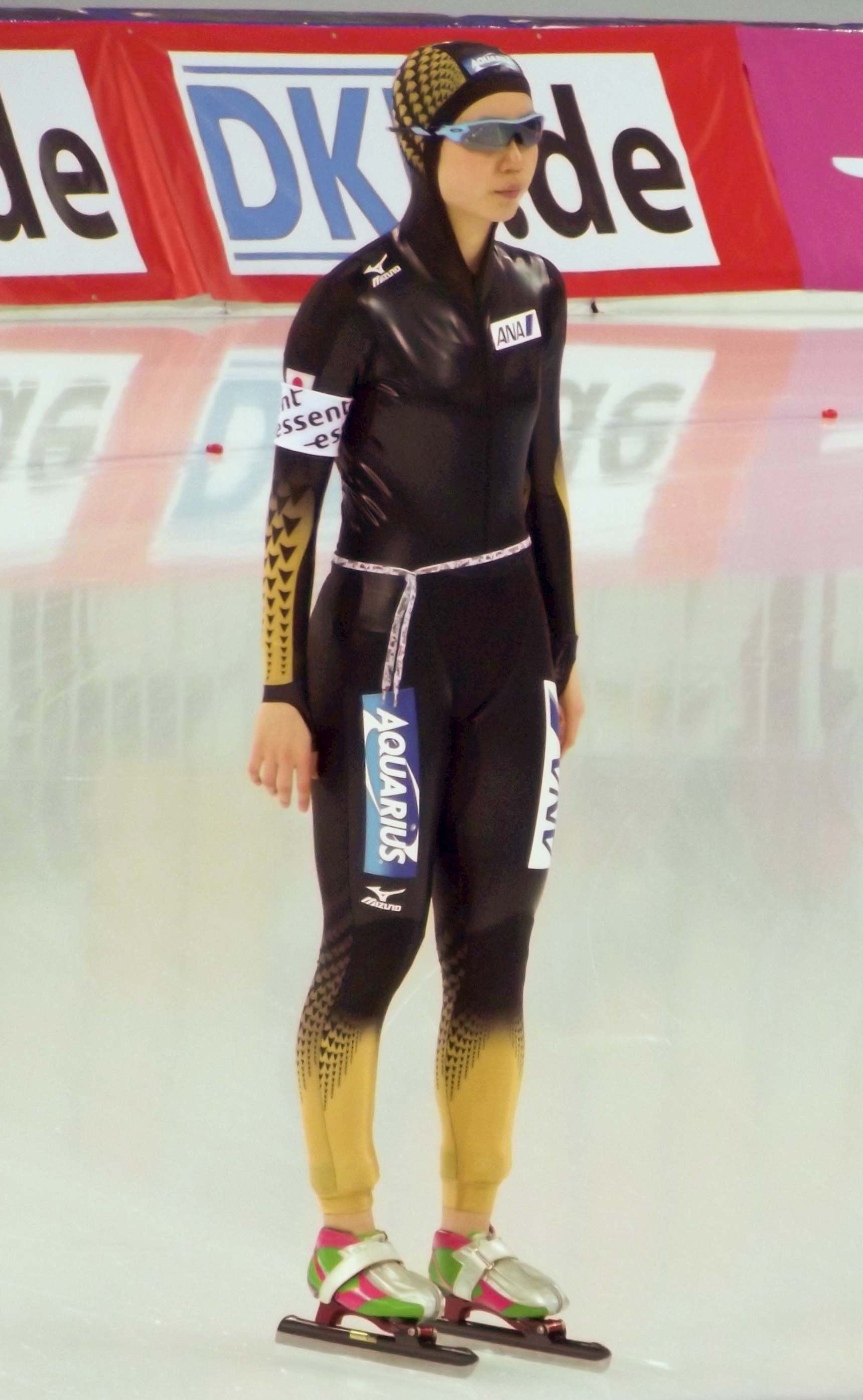
- Takagi at the 2013 World Single Distance Championships

Personal information
- Nationality: Japanese
- Born: 22 May 1994 (age 32) Makubetsu, Hokkaido, Japan
- Height: 1.63 m (5 ft 4 in)
- Weight: 57 kg (126 lb)

Sport
- Country: Japan
- Sport: Speed skating
- Events: 1000 m, 1500 m, 3000 m
- Club: Nippon Sport Science University
Medal record
Women's speed skating
Representing Japan
Olympic Games
Gold medal – first place	2018 Pyeongchang	Team pursuit
Gold medal – first place	2022 Beijing	1000 m
Silver medal – second place	2018 Pyeongchang	1500 m
Silver medal – second place	2022 Beijing	500 m
Silver medal – second place	2022 Beijing	1500 m
Silver medal – second place	2022 Beijing	Team pursuit
Bronze medal – third place	2018 Pyeongchang	1000 m
Bronze medal – third place	2026 Milano Cortina	500 m
Bronze medal – third place	2026 Milano Cortina	1000 m
Bronze medal – third place	2026 Milano Cortina	Team pursuit
World Single Distances Championships
Gold medal – first place	2015 Heerenveen	Team pursuit
Gold medal – first place	2019 Inzell	Team pursuit
Gold medal – first place	2020 Salt Lake City	Team pursuit
Gold medal – first place	2024 Calgary	1000 m
Gold medal – first place	2024 Calgary	1500 m
Gold medal – first place	2025 Hamar	1000 m
Silver medal – second place	2016 Kolomna	Team pursuit
Silver medal – second place	2017 Gangneung	Team pursuit
Silver medal – second place	2019 Inzell	1500 m
Silver medal – second place	2025 Hamar	Team pursuit
Bronze medal – third place	2016 Kolomna	Mass start
Bronze medal – third place	2017 Gangneung	1500 m
Bronze medal – third place	2020 Salt Lake City	1000 m
Bronze medal – third place	2023 Heerenveen	1000 m
Bronze medal – third place	2023 Heerenveen	1500 m
Bronze medal – third place	2024 Calgary	Team pursuit
World Sprint Championships
Gold medal – first place	2020 Hamar	Sprint
Gold medal – first place	2024 Inzell	Sprint
Silver medal – second place	2019 Heerenveen	Sprint
World Allround Championships
Gold medal – first place	2018 Amsterdam	Allround
Silver medal – second place	2019 Calgary	Allround
Silver medal – second place	2022 Hamar	Allround
Bronze medal – third place	2017 Hamar	Allround
Bronze medal – third place	2026 Heerenveen	Allround
Four Continents Championships
Gold medal – first place	2024 Salt Lake City	1000 m
Gold medal – first place	2024 Salt Lake City	1500 m
Gold medal – first place	2024 Salt Lake City	Team sprint
Gold medal – first place	2025 Hachinohe	1500 m
Asian Games
Gold medal – first place	2017 Sapporo	1500 m
Gold medal – first place	2017 Sapporo	3000 m
Gold medal – first place	2017 Sapporo	Mass start
Silver medal – second place	2017 Sapporo	1000 m
Bronze medal – third place	2011 Astana/Almaty	Team pursuit
Winter Universiade
Gold medal – first place	Trentino 2013	1000 m

Miho Takagi (高木 美帆, Takagi Miho; born 22 May 1994) is a Japanese speed skater. She has won a total of ten medals at the Olympics, two of them gold.

== Career ==
At the age of 15, Takagi represented Japan at the 2010 Winter Olympics, finishing 35th in the women's 1000 metres and 23rd in the 1500 metres. In 2012 and 2013, she won the World Junior Speed Skating Championships.

After participating in several world cup and world championship events, she became a world champion when in the 2015 World Single Distance Championships she won the gold medal in the team pursuit where she participated together with her sister Nana Takagi and compatriot Ayaka Kikuchi.

In competition in Salt Lake City of 2017–18 ISU Speed Skating World Cup, with Nana and Ayano Sato, she won women's team pursuit with the world record of 2:50.87.

In the 2018 Olympics, Takagi won the silver medal in the women's 1500-metre speed skating event and the bronze medal in the women's 1000-metre speed skating event. Takagi was also part of the Nippon team that won the 2018 Olympics women's team pursuit with a time of 2:53.89, the Olympic record and the sea-level world best.

She won the women's competition at the 2018 World Allround Speed Skating Championships.

In the 2017–18 world cup, the Nippon team she was part of won all women's team pursuit competitions of the world cup and became a 3-continuous-season overall world cup winner in the pursuit, and overall winner in women's 1500 metres and allround.

She finished second in the 2019 World Allround Speed Skating Championships.

Takagi set a world record in the women's 1500 meters in 2019 with a time of 1:49.83 in Salt Lake City, Utah.

At 2022 Winter Olympics, Takagi earned three silver medals in 1500m, 500m, and team pursuit. At the point when she earned her third medal in the 2022 games, which was her sixth overall, she became the Japanese female athlete with the biggest number of Olympic medals earned, surpassing three other athletes, Miya Tachibana and Miho Takeda in synchronized swimming, and Ryoko Tani in Judo, all of those who have earned 5 Olympic medals each in summer games. Takagi also won her second Olympic gold, and the first one in an individual event, in 1000m with a new Olympic record time of 1:13:19.

At the 2025 Calgary Speed Skating World Cup, Takagi won the individual 1000m event, bringing her tally of wins at champion and Olympic level events to 34, tying for the most overall wins by a Japanese athlete.

On 4 March 2026, Takagi announced her retirement effective after the 2026 World Allround Speed Skating Championships in the Netherlands.

On 28 July 2026, it was announced that Takagi would be receiving the People's Honour Award at a ceremony scheduled for 4 August 2026.

== Personal records ==
Distance	Result	Date	Location
500 m	37.12	13 February 2022	Beijing National Speed Skating Oval, Beijing
1000 m	1:11.71	9 March 2019	Utah Olympic Oval, Salt Lake City
1500 m	1:49.83	10 March 2019	Utah Olympic Oval, Salt Lake City
3000 m	3:55.45	10 December 2021	Olympic Oval, Calgary
5000 m	7:01.97	6 March 2022	Hamar Olympic Hall, Hamar

She is currently in 2nd position in the adelskalender.

=== Olympic Games ===
10 medals – (2 gold, 4 silver, 4 bronze)

Event	500 m	1000 m	1500 m	3000 m	5000 m	Team pursuit
(Canada) 2010 Vancouver	—	35th	23rd	—	—	—
(South Korea) 2018 Pyeongchang	—	Bronze	Silver	5th	—	Gold
(China) 2022 Beijing	Silver	Gold	Silver	6th	—	Silver
(Italy) 2026 Milano Cortina	Bronze	Bronze	6th	—	—	Bronze

== See also ==
- List of world records in speed skating
- World record progression 1500 m speed skating women
- World record progression team pursuit speed skating women
- List of Olympic records in speed skating
- List of multiple Olympic medalists at a single Games
