= Isabelle Weidemann =

Canadian speed skater (born 1995)

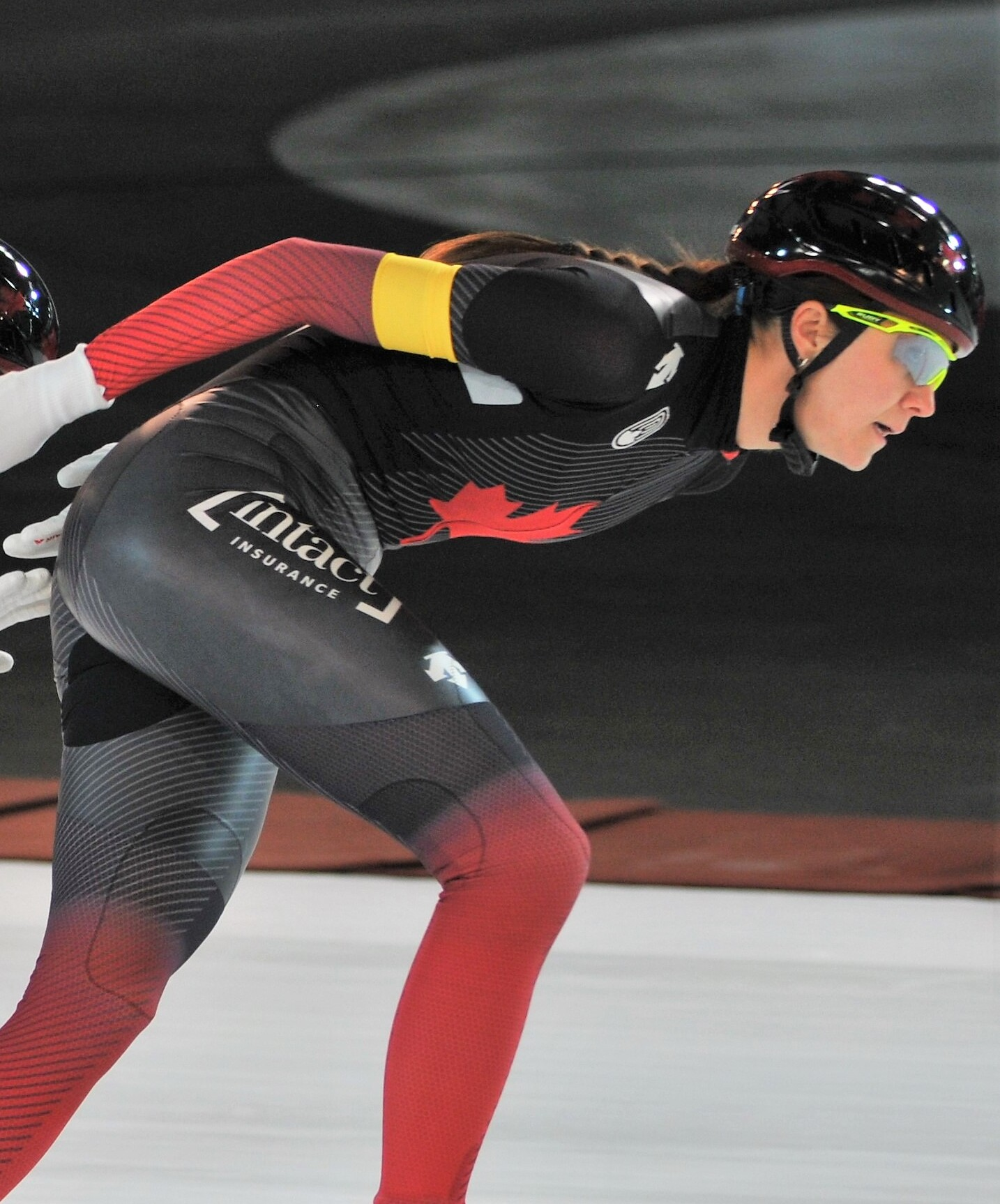
- Weidemann at a World Cup Team Pursuit event in 2020

Personal information
- Born: July 18, 1995 (age 30) Ottawa, Ontario, Canada
- Height: 188 cm (6 ft 2 in)
- Weight: 70 kg (154 lb)

Sport
- Country: Canada
- Sport: Speed skating
- Event: Team pursuit
- Club: Gloucester Concordes

Achievements and titles
- Olympic finals: 2018; 2022
- Personal bests: 500=0:40.34; 1,000=1:17.53; 1,500=1:54.02; 3,000=3:55.33; 5,000=6:46.81
Medal record
Women's speed skating
Representing Canada
Winter Olympic Games
Gold medal – first place	2022 Beijing	Team pursuit
Gold medal – first place	2026 Milano Cortina	Team pursuit
Silver medal – second place	2022 Beijing	5000 m
Bronze medal – third place	2022 Beijing	3000 m
World Single Distances Championships
Gold medal – first place	2023 Heerenveen	Team pursuit
Silver medal – second place	2021 Heerenveen	Team pursuit
Silver medal – second place	2024 Calgary	3000 m
Silver medal – second place	2024 Calgary	Team pursuit
Bronze medal – third place	2020 Salt Lake City	Team pursuit
Bronze medal – third place	2025 Hamar	Team pursuit
Four Continents Championships
Gold medal – first place	2024 Salt Lake City	Team pursuit
Silver medal – second place	2024 Salt Lake City	3000 m
Silver medal – second place	2025 Hachinohe	3000 m

Isabelle Weidemann (born July 18, 1995) is a Canadian speed skater. She is a multiple Olympic medallist, winning gold in the team pursuit, silver in the 5,000 metre, and bronze in the 3,000 metre at the 2022 Winter Olympics. She is the third Canadian long track speedskater ever to have won more than two medals at a single Winter Olympic Games following Cindy Klassen and Gaétan Boucher. She also won a gold medal in the team pursuit at the 2026 Winter Olympics in Milan. Weidemann also previously won a silver and bronze medal at the 2021 and 2020 World Single Distance Championships in women's team pursuit.

== Career ==
Weidemann's first competition for the Canadian national team was during the 2014 World Junior Speed Skating Championships. She began competing in her first full senior season during the 2015-16 World Cup competition. At the 2015 World Single Distance Speed Skating Championships she placed fifth in the 5,000 m, indicating the success she may have in the long-distance events in her career. Weidemann won her first World Cup medals when she won a pair of bronze medals as part of the team pursuit in the fall of the 2017-18 World Cup season. Weidemann was named to Canada's 2018 Olympic team where she finished seventh and sixth respectively in the 3,000 m and 5,000 m events in her first Olympic competition.

Following the Olympics, during the 2018-19 World Cup season, she began to find individual success, finishing on the podium several times, including one gold medal. The following season, she finished second overall in the World Cup standings for long-distance events and had two gold medal wins. Weidemann also won a bronze medal as part of the team pursuit with Ivanie Blondin and Valérie Maltais at the 2020 World Single Distance Speed Skating Championships. The trio of Canadian speed skaters would continue success together the following season, winning both World Cup events and winning silver at the 2021 World Single Distance Speed Skating Championships taking place during a pandemic shortened season.

=== 2022 Winter Olympics ===
In January 2022, Weidemann was named to Canada's 2022 Olympic team. She won Canada's first medal of the games, a bronze, in the 3000 metres event. This was the first medal for Canadian female speed skaters since the 2010 Winter Olympics when Kristina Groves won bronze in the same distance. After winning the medal she told Canadian media that "It's pretty surreal right now, I'm pretty emotional. But I'm very excited." Weidemann would later win the silver medal in the 5000 metres event. Weidemann also won the gold medal in the team pursuit event. Due to her successes at the games, Weidemann was named as the closing ceremony flagbearer.

=== 2026 Winter Olympics ===
On February 17, 2026, Weidemann won gold in the women's team pursuit event at the 2026 Winter Olympics alongside teammates Ivanie Blondin and Valérie Maltais with a time of 2:55.80.

== Records ==
As of February 2026, Weidemann has held the Canadian record at 5000 m since 18 October 2019, when she broke the record held by Cindy Klassen for more than 13 years (19 March 2006); Weideman further lowered the Canadian record on 14 October 2021, with a time of 6:46.81, at the Olympic Oval in Calgary, Alberta.
