= 2020 World Allround Speed Skating Championships =

International speed skating competition

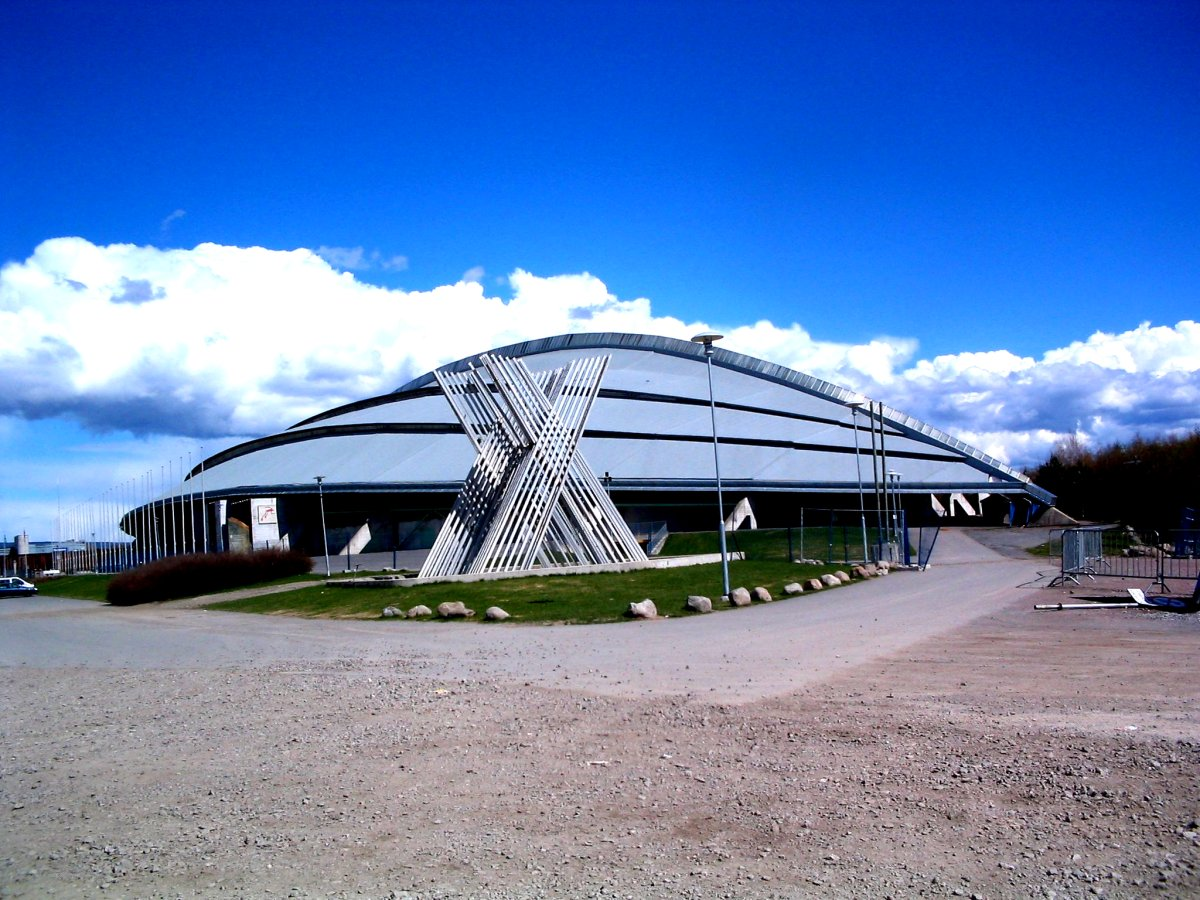
- Location: Hamar, Norway
- Venue: Vikingskipet
- Dates: 29 February – 1 March

Medalist men
1st place, gold medalist(s)		Patrick Roest	Netherlands
2nd place, silver medalist(s)		Sverre Lunde Pedersen	Norway
3rd place, bronze medalist(s)		Seitaro Ichinohe	Japan

Medalist women
1st place, gold medalist(s)		Ireen Wüst	Netherlands
2nd place, silver medalist(s)		Ivanie Blondin	Canada
3rd place, bronze medalist(s)		Antoinette de Jong	Netherlands

The 2020 World Allround Speed Skating Championships were held at the Vikingskipet in Hamar, Norway, from 29 February to 1 March 2020.

== Schedule ==
All times are local (UTC+1).

Date	Time	Event
29 February	11:53	Women's 500 m
29 February	12:25	Men's 500 m
29 February	14:50	Women's 3000 m
29 February	16:08	Men's 5000 m
1 March	13:00	Women's 1500 m
1 March	13:52	Men's 1500 m
1 March	14:43	Women's 5000 m
1 March	15:33	Men's 10,000 m

== Medal summary ==
=== Medal table ===
* Host nation (Norway)

Rank	Nation	Gold	Silver	Bronze	Total
1	Netherlands	2	0	1	3
2	Canada	0	1	0	1
2	Norway*	0	1	0	1
4	Japan	0	0	1	1
Totals (4 entries)		2	2	2	6

=== Medalists ===
Event	Gold		Silver		Bronze	
Men	Patrick Roest; Netherlands	147.880	Sverre Lunde Pedersen; Norway	149.277	Seitaro Ichinohe; Japan	149.310
Women	Ireen Wüst; Netherlands	159.524	Ivanie Blondin; Canada	160.462	Antoinette de Jong; Netherlands	160.631
