= 2020 World Single Distances Speed Skating Championships =

- Venue: Utah Olympic Oval, Salt Lake City, United States
- Dates: February 13–16

The 2020 World Single Distances Speed Skating Championships were held between February 13 and 16, 2020, at the Utah Olympic Oval in Salt Lake City, United States.

== Schedule ==
All times are local (UTC−7).

Date	Time	Events
February 13	12:30	3000 m women
February 13	13:39	5000 m men
February 13	15:25	Team sprint women
February 13	15:42	Team sprint men
February 14	14:00	10000 m men
February 14	15:58	Team pursuit women
February 14	16:30	500 m men
February 14	17:09	500 m women
February 15	12:30	5000 m women
February 15	13:35	1000 m men
February 15	14:22	1000 m women
February 15	15:09	Team pursuit men
February 16	12:30	1500 m women
February 16	13:25	1500 m men
February 16	14:21	Mass start women
February 16	14:43	Mass start men

== Medal summary ==
=== Medal table ===
* Host nation (United States)

Rank	Nation	Gold	Silver	Bronze	Total
1	Netherlands	7	5	2	14
2	Russia	3	5	4	12
3	Canada	3	2	4	9
4	Japan	2	1	2	5
5	Czech Republic	1	1	0	2
6	China	0	1	0	1
6	South Korea	0	1	0	1
8	Germany	0	0	1	1
8	Norway	0	0	1	1
8	Poland	0	0	1	1
8	United States*	0	0	1	1
Totals (11 entries)		16	16	16	48

=== Men's events ===
Event	Gold		Silver		Bronze	
500 m	Pavel Kulizhnikov; Russia	33.72	Ruslan Murashov; Russia	33.99	Tatsuya Shinhama; Japan	34.03
1000 m	Pavel Kulizhnikov; Russia	1:05.69; WR	Kjeld Nuis; Netherlands	1:06.73	Laurent Dubreuil; Canada	1:06.76
1500 m	Kjeld Nuis; Netherlands	1:41.66	Thomas Krol; Netherlands	1:41.73	Joey Mantia; United States	1:42.16
5000 m	Ted-Jan Bloemen; Canada	6:04.37	Sven Kramer; Netherlands	6:04.91	Graeme Fish; Canada	6:06.32
10,000 m	Graeme Fish; Canada	12:33.86; WR	Ted-Jan Bloemen; Canada	12:45.01	Patrick Beckert; Germany	12:47.93
Team pursuit	Netherlands; Marcel Bosker; Douwe de Vries; Sven Kramer	3:34.68; WR	Japan; Seitaro Ichinohe; Riku Tsuchiya; Shane Williamson	3:36.41	Russia; Danila Semerikov; Sergey Trofimov; Ruslan Zakharov	3:37.24
Team sprint	Netherlands; Dai Dai N'tab; Kai Verbij; Thomas Krol	1:18.18	China; Gao Tingyu; Wang Shiwei; Ning Zhongyan	1:18.53	Norway; Bjørn Magnussen; Håvard Holmefjord Lorentzen; Odin By Farstad	1:19.54
Mass start	Jorrit Bergsma; Netherlands	60	Jordan Belchos; Canada	40	Antoine Gélinas-Beaulieu; Canada	24

=== Women's events ===
Event	Gold		Silver		Bronze	
500 m	Nao Kodaira; Japan	36.69	Angelina Golikova; Russia	36.74	Olga Fatkulina; Russia	36.78
1000 m	Jutta Leerdam; Netherlands	1:11.84	Olga Fatkulina; Russia	1:12.33	Miho Takagi; Japan	1:12.34
1500 m	Ireen Wüst; Netherlands	1:50.92	Evgeniia Lalenkova; Russia	1:51.13	Elizaveta Kazelina; Russia	1:51.41
3000 m	Martina Sáblíková; Czech Republic	3:54.25	Carlijn Achtereekte; Netherlands	3:54.92	Natalya Voronina; Russia	3:55.54
5000 m	Natalya Voronina; Russia	6:39.02; WR	Martina Sáblíková; Czech Republic	6:41.18	Esmee Visser; Netherlands	6:46.68
Team pursuit	Japan; Ayano Sato; Miho Takagi; Nana Takagi	2:50.76; WR	Netherlands; Antoinette de Jong; Melissa Wijfje; Ireen Wüst	2:52.65	Canada; Ivanie Blondin; Valérie Maltais; Isabelle Weidemann	2:53.62
Team sprint	Netherlands; Femke Kok; Jutta Leerdam; Letitia de Jong	1:24.02; WR	Russia; Angelina Golikova; Olga Fatkulina; Daria Kachanova	1:24.50	Poland; Andżelika Wójcik; Kaja Ziomek; Natalia Czerwonka	1:25.37
Mass start	Ivanie Blondin; Canada	60	Kim Bo-reum; South Korea	40	Irene Schouten; Netherlands	20
