= Ivanie Blondin =

Canadian speed skater (born 1990)

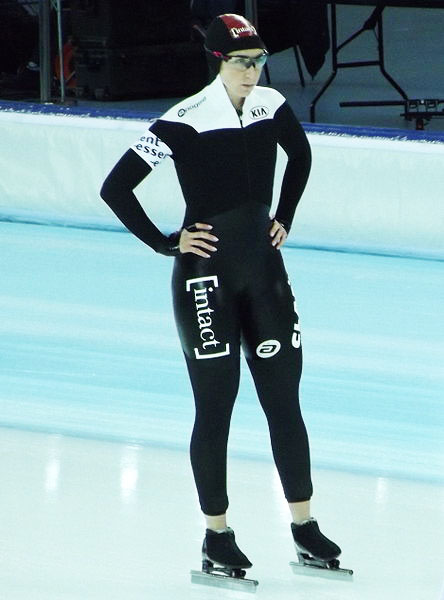
- Ivanie Blondin in 2013

Personal information
- Born: April 2, 1990 (age 36) Ottawa, Ontario
- Height: 1.62 m (5 ft 4 in)
- Weight: 55 kg (121 lb)

Sport
- Country: Canada
- Sport: Speed skating
- Events: 5000 m, Mass start
- Club: Gloucester Concordes
Medal record
Women's speed skating
Representing Canada
Olympic Games
Gold medal – first place	2022 Beijing	Team pursuit
Gold medal – first place	2026 Milano Cortina	Team pursuit
Silver medal – second place	2022 Beijing	Mass start
Silver medal – second place	2026 Milano Cortina	Mass start
World Single Distances Championships
Gold medal – first place	2016 Kolomna	Mass start
Gold medal – first place	2020 Salt Lake City	Mass start
Gold medal – first place	2023 Heerenveen	Team sprint
Gold medal – first place	2023 Heerenveen	Team pursuit
Gold medal – first place	2024 Calgary	Team sprint
Silver medal – second place	2015 Heerenveen	Mass start
Silver medal – second place	2019 Inzell	Mass start
Silver medal – second place	2021 Heerenveen	Mass start
Silver medal – second place	2021 Heerenveen	Team pursuit
Silver medal – second place	2023 Heerenveen	Mass start
Silver medal – second place	2024 Calgary	Mass start
Silver medal – second place	2024 Calgary	Team pursuit
Silver medal – second place	2025 Hamar	Team sprint
Silver medal – second place	2025 Hamar	Mass start
Bronze medal – third place	2017 Gangneung	5000 m
Bronze medal – third place	2020 Salt Lake City	Team pursuit
Bronze medal – third place	2025 Hamar	Team pursuit
World Allround Championships
Silver medal – second place	2020 Hamar	Allround
Four Continents Championships
Gold medal – first place	2024 Salt Lake City	Mass start
Gold medal – first place	2024 Salt Lake City	Team pursuit
Gold medal – first place	2025 Hachinohe	Mass start
Gold medal – first place	2025 Hachinohe	Team sprint
Bronze medal – third place	2024 Salt Lake City	Team sprint
Bronze medal – third place	2025 Hachinohe	1500 m
Bronze medal – third place	2025 Hachinohe	3000 m

Ivanie Blondin (born April 2, 1990) is a Canadian speed skater. She primarily skates in the long distances of 3000 m and 5000 m and the mass start event. Blondin won a silver medal in the mass start event at the 2015 World Single Distance Speed Skating Championships and again at the 2025 World Single Distances Speed Skating Championships and a gold medal in the same event at the 2020 World Single Distances Speed Skating Championships. She also won the silver medal at the 2020 World Allround Speed Skating Championships. She won a gold medal at the 2022 Winter Olympics, in Women's team pursuit, and at the 2026 Winter Olympics, once again in the team pursuit discipline.

== Career ==
She began her career competing in short track speed skating while a youth in the Gloucester Concordes skating club. She competed there with fellow Olympian Vincent De Haître, to whom she feels like an older sister. After Blondin failed to qualify in short track for the 2010 Winter Olympics in Vancouver she nearly quit sport. Mike Rivet, her coach in Gloucester, convinced her to switch to long track. Reflecting on this decision, she said, "I was ready to quit skating because I was just so discouraged and disappointed with it. I think (the switch) was the best decision I could have ever made." As a result, Blondin represented Canada in both the long-distance events at the 2014 Winter Olympics in Sochi as well as the team pursuit event.

Blondin won her first major competitive medal when she placed second in the mass start event at the 2015 World Single Distance Championships. After the race, she said, "I would have preferred the gold medal, but finishing first at this stage of my career remains a big accomplishment for me, so I'm super pumped with second place. I'm ecstatic with the result, which follows a fantastic season."

=== 2018 Olympics ===
After results from the 2017–18 ISU Speed Skating World Cup, Blondin pre-qualified for the 2018 Winter Olympics in Pyeongchang, South Korea. She competed in the 3000 m, 5000 m, mass start, and team relay events.

In 2020, she won the mass start event gold medal at the 2020 World Single Distances Speed Skating Championships at the Utah Olympic Oval in Salt Lake City, United States. This was followed up with the silver medal at the World Allround Speed Skating Championships in March. She was the first Canadian woman to reach the overall podium at that event since 2012 and the fifth since the event started in 1936.

=== 2022 Winter Olympics ===
In January 2022, Blondin was named to her third Olympic team. Blondin won the gold medal as part of the team pursuit event.

Blondin competed in the mass start event at the Olympics, winning her semifinal to go on to the final. In the last lap of the final, Blondin was following behind Irene Schouten; over the last turn, Blondin led, but Schouten pushed passed her to edge her out for the gold. Blondin won her second silver medal of these games. After the race, she spoke with CBC Sports: "These races, the mass start, it fires me up. I'm a little bit of a fighter, and I'm very competitive, so the fact that girls were pushing me and there was a lot of jostling and pushing and shoving around just fires me up and kinda gets me going."

=== 2025 Word Single Distances Speed Skating Championships ===
At the 2025 World Single Distances Speed Skating Championships she won three medals: silver medals in the mass start (her eighth career mass start medal at the world championships) and team sprint events, and bronze in the team pursuit event.

=== 2026 Winter Olympics ===
On February 17, 2026, Blouin won gold in the women's team pursuit event at the 2026 Winter Olympics alongside teammates Valérie Maltais and Isabelle Weidemann with a time of 2:55.80. She later won her second medal of the Games with a silver in the mass start.

== Personal life ==
Blondin started skating in her backyard at the age of 2. She initially was in figure skating, but seeing herself as a tomboy, she was more inclined to speed skate and took that up at age seven instead. Blondin said she loved the feeling of speed on her skates, which is why she chose the sport over cross-country skiing. Born in Ottawa, Ontario, Blondin attended École secondaire catholique Garneau, a catholic French high school; she completed a Veterinary Assistant program at Robertson College online and has a pet parrot named Gizmo and a St. Bernard-Pyrenees cross named Brooks. Blondin married Hungarian speed skater Konrád Nagy in 2020.

== Personal records ==
Personal records
Women's speed skating
Event	Result	Date	Location	Notes
500 m	38.83	23 February 2019	Olympic Oval, Calgary	
1000 m	1:14.18	4 January 2020	Olympic Oval, Calgary	
1500 m	1:51.76	8 February 2020	Utah Olympic Oval, Salt Lake City	Current Canadian record (2020–)
3000 m	3:56.88	3 December 2021	Utah Olympic Oval, Salt Lake City	
5000 m	6:48.98	15 February 2020	Utah Olympic Oval, Salt Lake City	

She is currently in 6th position in the adelskalender.
