= Nana Takagi =

Japanese speed skater (born 1992)

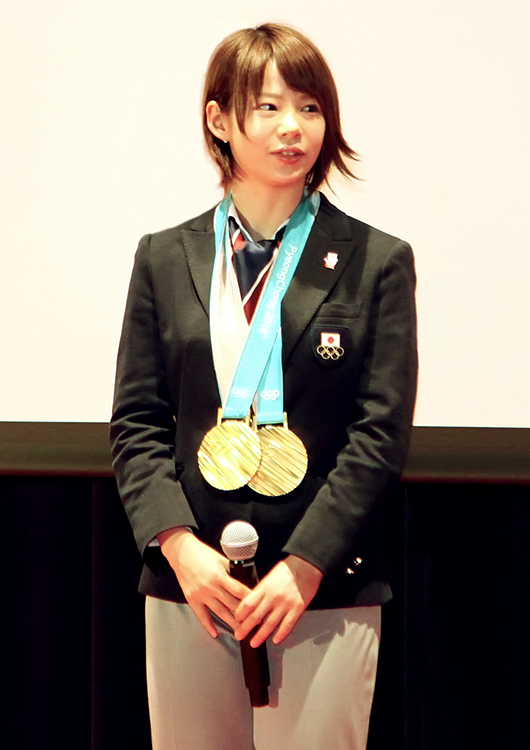
- Nana Takagi in 2018

Personal information
- Nationality: Japanese
- Born: 2 July 1992 (age 33) Makubetsu, Japan
- Height: 1.55 m (5 ft 1 in)
- Weight: 45 kg (99 lb)

Sport
- Country: Japan
- Sport: Speed skating
- Event: Mass start
- Club: Nidec Sankyo Corporation
- Retired: 2022

Achievements and titles
- Highest world ranking: 14 (mass start)
Medal record
Women's speed skating
Representing Japan
Olympic Games
Gold medal – first place	2018 Pyeongchang	Mass start
Gold medal – first place	2018 Pyeongchang	Team pursuit
Silver medal – second place	2022 Beijing	Team pursuit
World Single Distances Championships
Gold medal – first place	2015 Heerenveen	Team pursuit
Gold medal – first place	2019 Inzell	Team pursuit
Gold medal – first place	2020 Salt Lake City	Team pursuit
Silver medal – second place	2016 Kolomna	Team pursuit
Silver medal – second place	2017 Gangneung	Mass start
Silver medal – second place	2017 Gangneung	Team pursuit

Nana Takagi (髙木 菜那) (born 2 July 1992) is a Japanese former speed skater who is a member of the Nidec Sankyo speed skating team.

== Career ==
Takagi has won a pair of silver medals at the World Junior Speed Skating Championships, in two team pursuit events.

She made her World Cup debut in November 2013. As of September 2014, Takagi has one World Cup podium finish, as part of the Japanese team pursuit squad at Heerenveen in 2013–14. Her best individual finish is 5th in a 5000 m race at Astana in 2013–14. Her best overall finish in the World Cup is 14th, in the 2013–14 mass start.

Takagi competed at the 2014 Winter Olympics for Japan. In the 1500 metres she placed 32nd. She was also part of the Japanese team pursuit squad, which won their semi-final, before losing to the Netherlands in the semi-final and to Russia in the bronze medal final, ending up 4th overall.

In 2015 Nana Takagi became a world champion, when in the 2015 World Single Distance Championships she won the gold medal in the team pursuit where she participated together with her sister Miho Takagi and compatriot Ayaka Kikuchi.

In 2018, Takagi was part of the Japanese team that won the Olympics women team pursuit gold medal. Takagi won a second gold medal at the 2018 Olympics in the Women's mass start event.

== World Cup podiums ==
Date	Season	Location	Rank	Event
16 March 2014	2011–12	Heerenveen	3rd place, bronze medalist(s)	Team pursuit

== See also ==
- List of world records in speed skating
- World record progression team pursuit speed skating women
- List of Olympic records in speed skating
- List of multiple Olympic gold medalists at a single Games
