= Elizaveta Golubeva =

Kazakh speed skater (born 1996)

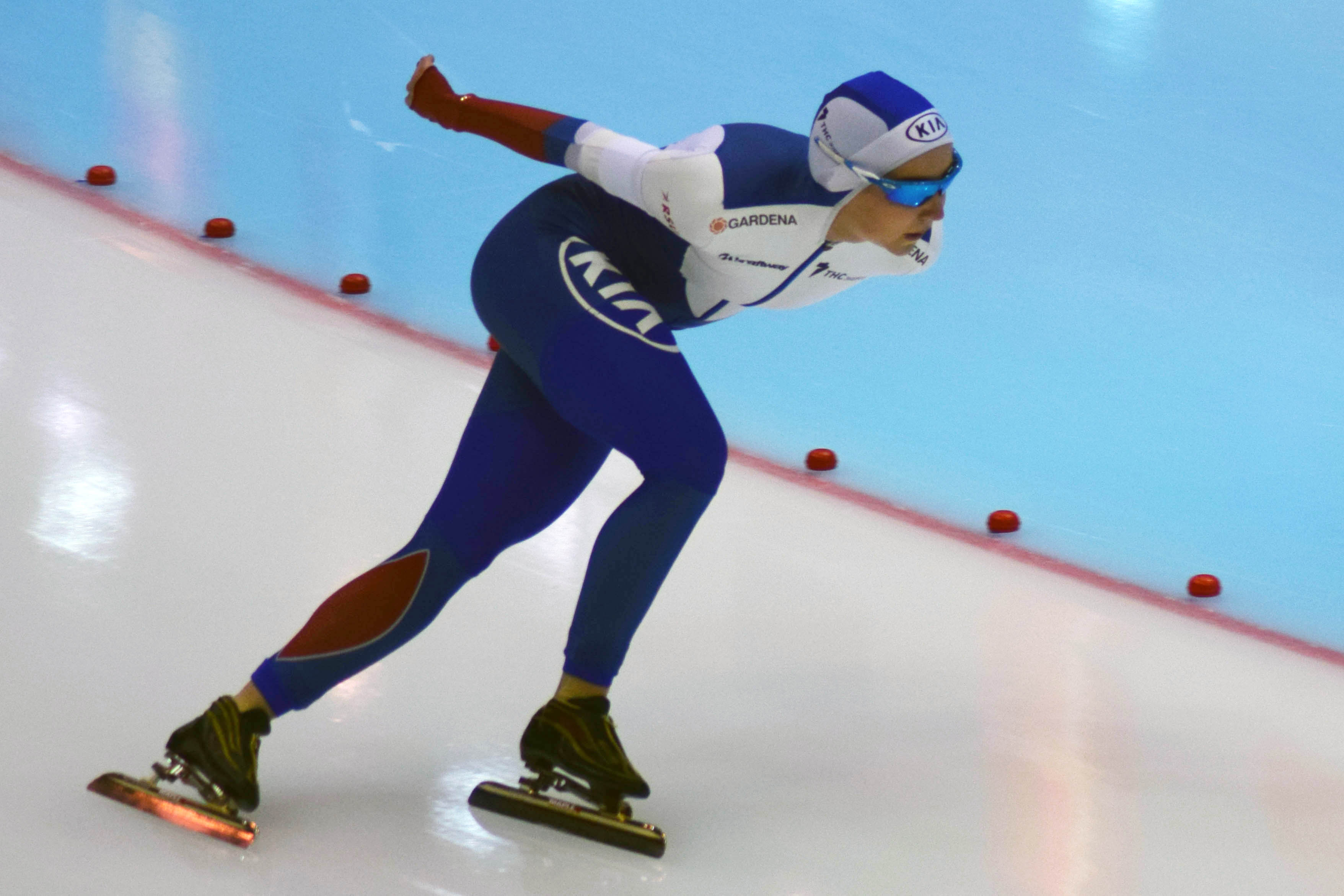
- Golubeva in 2016

Personal information
- Native name: Елизавета Сергеевна Голубева
- Nationality: Kazakh
- Born: Elizaveta Kazelina; 19 September 1996 (age 29) Kolomna, Moscow Oblast, Russia
- Spouse: Kirill Golubev

Sport
- Country: Kazakhstan (2023–); Russia (2009–2023)
- Sport: Speed skating
- Event(s): 500 m, 1000 m, 1500 m, 3000 m, mass start
- Club: SDYSSOR "Kometa" (Kolomna); UOR (Bronnitsa)
- Coached by: Olga Kazelina; Sergey Kazelin
Medal record
Women's speed skating
Representing Russia
World Single Distances Championships
Bronze medal – third place	2016 Kolomna	Team pursuit
Bronze medal – third place	2019 Inzell	Mass start
Bronze medal – third place	2019 Inzell	Team pursuit
Bronze medal – third place	2020 Salt Lake City	1500 m
European Championships
Gold medal – first place	2018 Kolomna	Team sprint
Silver medal – second place	2020 Heerenveen	Team pursuit
Bronze medal – third place	2022 Heerenveen	Mass start
Bronze medal – third place	2022 Heerenveen	Team pursuit
World Junior Championships
Gold medal – first place	2016 Changchun	Overall
Gold medal – first place	2016 Changchun	1000 m
Gold medal – first place	2016 Changchun	1500 m
Gold medal – first place	2016 Changchun	3000 m
Gold medal – first place	2016 Changchun	Team sprint
Bronze medal – third place	2014 Bjugn	Overall
Bronze medal – third place	2014 Bjugn	1500 m
Bronze medal – third place	2015 Warsaw	Overall
Bronze medal – third place	2015 Warsaw	1000 m
Bronze medal – third place	2015 Warsaw	3000 m
Bronze medal – third place	2016 Changchun	500 m
Representing Russian Skating Union
World Single Distances Championships
Bronze medal – third place	2021 Heerenveen	1000 m
Bronze medal – third place	2021 Heerenveen	Team pursuit

Elizaveta Sergeyevna Golubeva (née Kazelina; (Note: Russian: Казелина) Russian: Елизавета Сергеевна Голубева; born 19 September 1996) is a Russian-born Kazakh speed skater, bronze medalist in single distance at the 2016 World Single Distance Speed Skating Championships. Kazelina is Master of Sports of Russia (2015). Her coaches are her parents Olga and Sergey. Her twin brother Mikhail Kazelin is also a speed skater.

== Career ==
=== Personal records ===
Personal records
Women's speed skating
Event	Result	Date	Location	Notes
500 m	38.37	9 December 2017	Utah Olympic Oval, Salt Lake City	
1000 m	1:13.45	11 December 2021	Olympic Oval, Calgary	
1500 m	1:51.41	16 February 2020	Utah Olympic Oval, Salt Lake City	
3000 m	4:00.11	14 November 2015	Utah Olympic Oval, Salt Lake City	
5000 m	7:17.50	20 November 2015	Utah Olympic Oval, Salt Lake City	

== World Cup results ==
=== Podiums ===
Date	Season	Location	Rank	Event
13 November 2016	2016–17	Harbin	2nd place, silver medalist(s)	Team pursuit
20 November 2016	2016–17	Nagano	3rd place, bronze medalist(s)	Team pursuit
3 December 2016	2016–17	Astana	3rd place, bronze medalist(s)	Team pursuit
11 March 2017	2016–17	Stavanger	3rd place, bronze medalist(s)	Team pursuit
12 November 2017	2017–18	Heerenveen	1st place, gold medalist(s)	Team sprint
1 December 2017	2017–18	Calgary	1st place, gold medalist(s)	Team sprint
16 November 2018	2018–19	Obihiro	3rd place, bronze medalist(s)	Team pursuit
23 November 2018	2018–19	Tomakomai	3rd place, bronze medalist(s)	Team pursuit
7 December 2018	2018–19	Tomaszów Mazowiecki	2nd place, silver medalist(s)	Team pursuit
23 November 2019	2019–20	Tomaszów Mazowiecki	1st place, gold medalist(s)	Team pursuit
8 December 2019	2019–20	Nur-Sultan	3rd place, bronze medalist(s)	Team pursuit
15 December 2019	2019–20	Nagano	3rd place, bronze medalist(s)	Team pursuit
30 January 2021	2020–21	Heerenveen	3rd place, bronze medalist(s)	Mass start

=== Overall rankings ===
Season	Event	Rank
2015–16	Team pursuit	3rd place, bronze medalist(s)
2020–21	Mass start	3rd place, bronze medalist(s)

== Personal life ==
Elizaveta was married to Kirill Golubev, a former speed skater, in April 2020. She subsequently took the name "Golubev".
