= Valérie Maltais =

Canadian speed skater (born 1990)

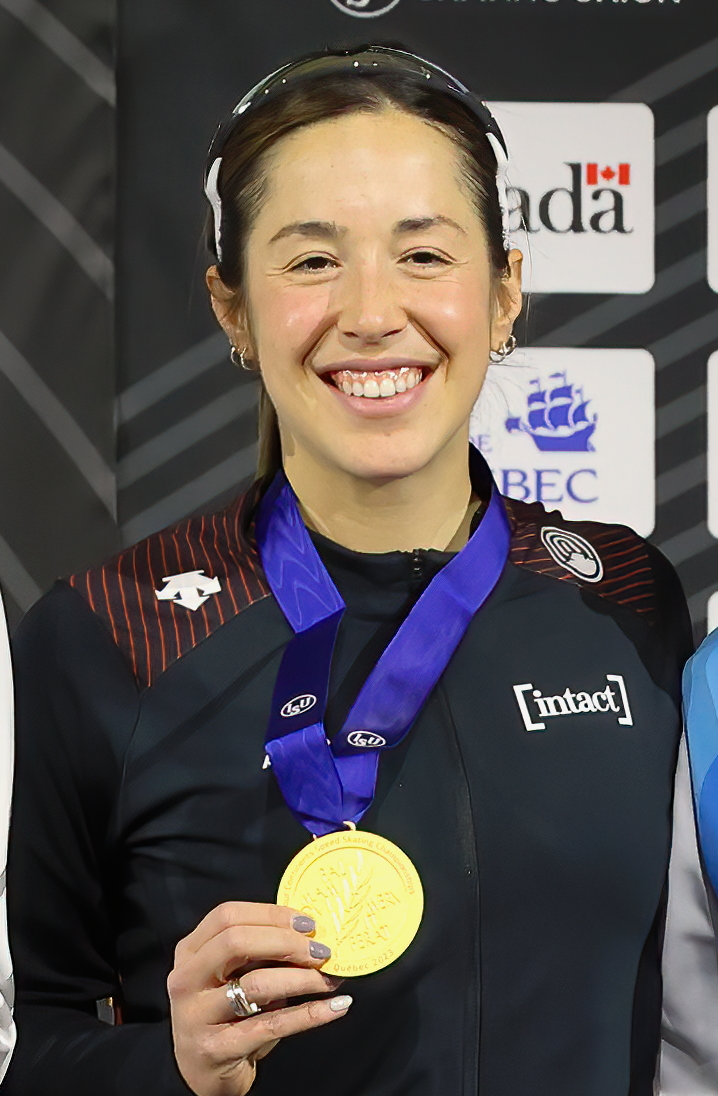
- Maltais in 2022

Personal information
- Born: July 4, 1990 (age 36) La Baie, Quebec, Canada
- Height: 1.64 m (5 ft 5 in)
- Weight: 62 kg (137 lb)
- Website: ValerieMaltais.com

Sport
- Country: Canada
- Sport: Speed skating
- Event: 3000 m
- Club: F-18 La Baie
Medal record
Representing Canada
Women's speed skating
Olympic Games
Gold medal – first place	2022 Beijing	Team pursuit
Gold medal – first place	2026 Milano Cortina	Team pursuit
Bronze medal – third place	2026 Milano Cortina	1500 m
Bronze medal – third place	2026 Milano Cortina	3000 m
World Single Distances Championships
Gold medal – first place	2023 Heerenveen	Team pursuit
Silver medal – second place	2021 Heerenveen	Team pursuit
Silver medal – second place	2024 Calgary	Team pursuit
Bronze medal – third place	2020 Salt Lake City	Team pursuit
Bronze medal – third place	2025 Hamar	Team pursuit
Four Continents Championships
Gold medal – first place	2023 Quebec	3000 m
Gold medal – first place	2023 Quebec	Mass start
Gold medal – first place	2023 Quebec	Team pursuit
Gold medal – first place	2024 Salt Lake City	3000 m
Gold medal – first place	2024 Salt Lake City	Team pursuit
Women's short-track speed skating
Olympic Games
Silver medal – second place	2014 Sochi	3000 m relay
World Championships
Gold medal – first place	2012 Shanghai	3000 m
Silver medal – second place	2010 Sofia	3000 m relay
Silver medal – second place	2012 Shanghai	Overall
Silver medal – second place	2013 Debrecen	3000 m relay
Silver medal – second place	2014 Montreal	3000 m relay
Silver medal – second place	2016 Seoul	3000 m relay
Bronze medal – third place	2011 Sheffield	3000 m relay
Bronze medal – third place	2012 Shanghai	1000 m
Bronze medal – third place	2014 Montreal	Overall
Bronze medal – third place	2014 Montreal	1000 m
Bronze medal – third place	2014 Montreal	3000 m
Bronze medal – third place	2018 Montreal	3000 m relay
World Team Championships
Silver medal – second place	2010 Bormio	Team

Valérie Maltais (French pronunciation: [valeʁi maltɛ]; born July 4, 1990) is a Canadian speed skater. She has won four Olympic medals and six world championship medals, finishing second overall in 2012 at the ISU World Short Track Championships. Maltais is the third athlete in the world and first Canadian to win Olympic medals in both short track and long track speed skating.

== Career ==
=== Early career ===
Maltais began skating at the age of 6 at her local rink in Saguenay, before quickly rising to Canadian Champion in the 1500m in 2009. In that same year, she received a bronze medal in relay at the World Short Track Championships. She was set to compete for Canada at the 2010 Winter Olympics in the Ladies' 3000m relay. Maltais did not compete in the relay however but did compete in the 1,500 m where she finished fourteenth.

Post-Olympics, Maltais succeeded at the 2012 World Championships. She won a bronze medal in a photo finish in the 1,000 m. With her success, she qualified for the 3000m superfinal, where she lapped her entire opposition and won the gold medal. Due to her results, she also won the silver medal in the overall standings at the competition. In the finals of the relay, however, teammate Marie-Ève Drolet fell and put the Canadians in fourth place, and Maltais just missed winning a fourth medal at the event.

=== 2014 Winter Olympics ===
Going into the 2014 Winter Olympics, Maltais was no longer a rookie Olympic competitor, though she still found herself as the youngest member of the women's short track team at those games. At the previous games she had not been invited to skate on the relay team and says that she was paralyzed with nerves. Maltais talked about her strategy, saying that "Last year, I spent more time at the front, and I think that it's a strategy that works well for me. I have to learn to change my laps and to better control my speed, but I think that this could be a good strategy." This strategy helped her at the national olympic trials, and Maltais competed in all three individual events in Sochi. She also competed in the 3000m relay, where Team Canada placed 2nd, earning her first Olympic medal.

=== 2018 Winter Olympics ===
In August 2017, Maltais was named to Canada's 2018 Winter Olympics team.

=== 2022 Winter Olympics ===
In January 2022, Maltais was named to her first Olympic team in long track speed skating. Maltais would go on to win the gold medal as part of the team pursuit event. In doing so, she became only the fourth athlete (and the first Canadian) to win Olympic medals in both short- and long-track speed skating, following Eric Flaim, Jorien ter Mors and Ruslan Zakharov.

=== 2026 Winter Olympics ===
In February 2026, Maltais won the bronze medal in women’s 3000m long track speed skating, winning Team Canada’s first medal of the Milano Cortina 2026 Olympic Winter Games. Maltais’ time matched exactly the previous Olympic record that had been set four years ago at Beijing 2022. On February 17, 2026, she won gold in the women's team pursuit event at the 2026 Winter Olympics alongside teammates Ivanie Blondin and Isabelle Weidemann with a time of 2:55.80. On February 20, 2026, she won her third medal at the 2026 games, bronze in the women's 1500m. She was selected as Canada's flag-bearer for the closing ceremony of the Games, alongside Steven Dubois.
