= Ayano Sato (speed skater) =

Japanese speed skater (born 1996)

Personal information
- Nationality: Japanese
- Born: 10 December 1996 (age 29) Kushiro, Japan
- Height: 1.57 m (5 ft 2 in)
- Weight: 56 kg (123 lb)

Sport
- Country: Japan
- Sport: Speed skating
- Event: Team pursuit
- Club: Takasaki University of Health and Welfare
Medal record
Women's speed skating
Representing Japan
Olympic Games
Gold medal – first place	2018 Pyeongchang	Team pursuit
Silver medal – second place	2022 Beijing	Team pursuit
Bronze medal – third place	2026 Milano Cortina	Team pursuit
World Single Distances Championships
Gold medal – first place	2019 Inzell	Team pursuit
Gold medal – first place	2020 Salt Lake City	Team pursuit
Silver medal – second place	2023 Heerenveen	Team pursuit
Silver medal – second place	2025 Hamar	Team pursuit
Bronze medal – third place	2024 Calgary	Team pursuit
Four Continents Championships
Gold medal – first place	2024 Salt Lake City	Team sprint

Ayano Sato (佐藤 綾乃, Satō Ayano; born 10 December 1996) is a Japanese speed skater. She competed in the women's 3000 metres at the 2018 Winter Olympics. Sato was part of the Japanese team that won the 2018 Olympics women team pursuit gold medal.

== See also ==
- List of world records in speed skating
- World record progression team pursuit speed skating women
- List of Olympic records in speed skating
