= 2020–21 ISU Speed Skating World Cup – World Cup 1 =

The first competition weekend of the 2020–21 ISU Speed Skating World Cup was held at Thialf in Heerenveen, the Netherlands, from Friday, 22 January, until Sunday, 24 January 2021.

== Medal summary ==
=== Men's events ===
| Event | Gold | Time | Silver | Time | Bronze | Time | Report |
|---|---|---|---|---|---|---|---|
| 500 m (1) | Dai Dai Ntab; Netherlands | 34.550 | Laurent Dubreuil; Canada | 34.650 | Ruslan Murashov; Russia | 34.665 | |
| 500 m (2) | Artem Arefyev; Russia | 34.459 | Dai Dai Ntab; Netherlands | 34.652 | Lennart Velema; Netherlands | 34.740 | |
| 1000 m | Thomas Krol; Netherlands | 1:07.486 | Kai Verbij; Netherlands | 1:07.579 | Pavel Kulizhnikov; Russia | 1:07.632 | |
| 1500 m | Thomas Krol; Netherlands | 1:43.243 | Patrick Roest; Netherlands | 1:44.457 | Kjeld Nuis; Netherlands | 1:44.662 | |
| 5000 m | Patrick Roest; Netherlands | 6:05.145; TR | Sven Kramer; Netherlands | 6:11.809 | Sergey Trofimov; Russia | 6:11.945 | |
| Mass start^{A} | Arjan Stroetinga; Netherlands | 60 | Livio Wenger; Switzerland | 40 | Bart Swings; Belgium | 20 | |
| Team pursuit | Netherlands; Sven Kramer; Chris Huizinga; Beau Snellink | 3:40.332 | Norway; Sverre Lunde Pedersen; Allan Dahl Johansson; Hallgeir Engebråten | 3:41.628 | Canada; Ted-Jan Bloemen; Jordan Belchos; Connor Howe | 3:41.711 | |

^{A} In mass start, race points are accumulated during the race based on results of the intermediate sprints and the final sprint. The skater with most race points is the winner.

=== Women's events ===
| Event | Gold | Time | Silver | Time | Bronze | Time | Report |
|---|---|---|---|---|---|---|---|
| 500 m (1) | Femke Kok; Netherlands | 37.089 | Angelina Golikova; Russia | 37.304 | Heather McLean; Canada | 37.368 | |
| 500 m (2) | Femke Kok; Netherlands | 37.276 | Angelina Golikova; Russia | 37.303 | Olga Fatkulina; Russia | 37.406 | |
| 1000 m | Brittany Bowe; United States | 1:13.607 | Jorien ter Mors; Netherlands | 1:13.943 | Femke Kok; Netherlands | 1:14.076 | |
| 1500 m | Brittany Bowe; United States | 1:53.881 | Ireen Wüst; Netherlands | 1:54.575 | Antoinette de Jong; Netherlands | 1:54.710 | |
| 3000 m | Irene Schouten; Netherlands | 3:57.155; TR | Antoinette de Jong; Netherlands | 3:58.521 | Joy Beune; Netherlands | 3:58.908 | |
| Mass start^{A} | Irene Schouten; Netherlands | 64 | Ivanie Blondin; Canada | 40 | Marijke Groenewoud; Netherlands | 22 | |
| Team pursuit | Canada; Ivanie Blondin; Isabelle Weidemann; Valerie Maltais | 2:56.718 | Netherlands; Ireen Wüst; Melissa Wijfje; Carlijn Achtereekte | 2:57.040 | Norway; Ida Njåtun; Ragne Wiklund; Marit Fjellanger Bøhm | 2:59.247; NR | |

^{A} In mass start, race points are accumulated during the race based on results of the intermediate sprints and the final sprint. The skater with most race points is the winner.
