= Speed skating at the 2026 Winter Olympics – Women's 3000 metres =

Women's 3000 metres at the XXV Olympic Winter Games
- Speed skating
- Venue: Milano Speed Skating Stadium, Milan
- Date: 7 February 2026
- Competitors: 20 from 14 nations
- Winning time: 3:54.28

Medalists
1st place, gold medalist(s)		Francesca Lollobrigida	Italy
2nd place, silver medalist(s)		Ragne Wiklund	Norway
3rd place, bronze medalist(s)		Valérie Maltais	Canada

The women's 3000 m competition in speed skating at the 2026 Winter Olympics was held on 7 February, at the Milano Speed Skating Stadium in Milan. Francesca Lollobrigida representing Italy won the event setting an Olympic record. This was her first Olympic gold medal, as well as the first Olympic gold won by an Italian female speed skater. Ragne Wiklund of Norway won silver, her first Olympic medal. Valérie Maltais of Canada became the bronze medalist, her first individual Olympic medal, and completed a full set of medals (one of which is in short-track).

== Background ==
The 2022 champion, Irene Schouten, retired from competitions. The silver, Francesca Lollobrigida, and the bronze medalist, Isabelle Weidemann, qualified for the Olympics, and both were competing. Before the Olympics, Ragne Wiklund was leading the long-distance standings of the 2025–26 ISU Speed Skating World Cup. Joy Beune was the 3000m 2025 world champion. The field also included the world record holder and multiple Olympic champion Martina Sáblíková but she withdrew on the day of the race.

== Records ==
Prior to this competition, the existing world, Olympic and track records were as follows.

World record	(Czech Republic) Martina Sáblíková	3:52.02	Salt Lake City, United States	9 March 2019
Olympic record	(Netherlands) Irene Schouten	3:56.93	Beijing, China	5 February 2022
Track record	(Kazakhstan) Kristina Shumekova	4:13.08		29 November 2025

A new Olympic record was set during the competition; the previous record was set four years earlier and was broken by 2.65 seconds; the top two finishers were under the previous record, which was equaled by the bronze medalist.

Date	Round	Athlete	Country	Time	Record
7 February	Pair 8	Francesca Lollobrigida	Italy	3:54.28	OR, TR

== Results ==
The race starts at 16:00.

Rank	Pair	Lane	Name	Country	Time	Time behind	Notes
1st place, gold medalist(s)	8	O	Francesca Lollobrigida	Italy	3:54.28		OR, PB
2nd place, silver medalist(s)	9	O	Ragne Wiklund	Norway	3:56.54	+2.26	
3rd place, bronze medalist(s)	8	I	Valérie Maltais	Canada	3:56.93	+2.65	
4	10	I	Joy Beune	Netherlands	3:58.12	+3.84	
5	10	O	Isabelle Weidemann	Canada	3:59.24	+4.96	
6	7	I	Nadezhda Morozova	Kazakhstan	4:01.20	+6.92	
7	5	O	Sandrine Tas	Belgium	4:01.26	+6.98	
8	9	I	Marijke Groenewoud	Netherlands	4:01.35	+7.07	
9	2	I	Merel Conijn	Netherlands	4:01.65	+7.37	
10	5	I	Elizaveta Golubeva	Kazakhstan	4:03.30	+9.02	
11	2	O	Kaitlyn McGregor	Switzerland	4:04.97	+10.69	
12	3	O	Kseniia Korzhova	Individual Neutral Athletes	4:05.84	+11.55	
13	1	O	Laura Hall	Canada	4:06.15	+11.85	
14	6	O	Josie Hofmann	Germany	4:06.54	+12.26	
15	7	O	Maryna Zuyeva	Individual Neutral Athletes	4:07.09	+12.81	
16	4	O	Violette Braun	France	4:07.17	+12.88	
17	4	I	Yang Binyu	China	4:07.62	+13.34	
18	6	I	Momoka Horikawa	Japan	4:08.32	+14.04	
19	3	I	Jeannine Rosner	Austria	4:08.42	+14.14	
20	1	I	Greta Myers	United States	4:13.47	+19.18	
