= 2023 KNSB Dutch Single Distance Championships – Women's 5000 m =

Dutch speed skating competition

- Venue: Thialf, Heerenveen
- Dates: 5 February 2023
- Competitors: 13 skaters

Medalist women
1st place, gold medalist(s)		Irene Schouten	NED
2nd place, silver medalist(s)		Sanne in 't Hof	NED
3rd place, bronze medalist(s)		Marijke Groenewoud	NED

The women's 5000 meters at the 2023 KNSB Dutch Single Distance Championships in Heerenveen took place at the Thialf ice skating rink on Sunday, 5 February 2023. Thirteen skaters competed in the event. Irene Schouten, Sanne in 't Hof, and Marijke Groenewoud finished first, second, and third, respectively, and qualified for the 2023 World Single Distances Speed Skating Championships in Heerenveen.

== Statistics ==
=== Result ===
Rank	Skater	Time
1st place, gold medalist(s)	Irene Schouten	6:50.36
2nd place, silver medalist(s)	Sanne in 't Hof	6:51.79
3rd place, bronze medalist(s)	Marijke Groenewoud	6:52.39 PR
4	Robin Groot	7:04.27 PR
5	Maike Verweij	7:09.19
6	Reina Anema	7:10.89
7	Eline Jansen	7:11.99 PR
8	Paulien Verhaar	7:13.85 PR
9	Eline van Voorden	7:24.91 PR
10	Aveline Hijlkemal	7:27.56
11	Elisa Dul	WDR
12	Joy Beune	WDR
13	Arianna Pruisscher	WDR

Referee: Loretta Staring. Assistant: Miriam Kuiper, Starter: Jans Rosing
.

=== Draw ===
Heat	Outer lane	Inner lane
1	Aveline Hijlkema	Eline van Voorden
2	Paulien Verhaar	Eline Jansen
3	Reina Anema	Robin Groot
4	Marijke Groenewoud	Maike Verweij
5	Irene Schouten	Sanne in 't Hof
6	Elisa Dul	Joy Beune
7	Arianna Pruisscher	
