= Speed skating at the 2026 Winter Olympics – Women's 5000 metres =

Women's 5000 metres at the XXV Olympic Winter Games
- Speed skating
- Venue: Milano Speed Skating Stadium, Milan
- Date: 12 February 2026
- Winning time: 6:46.17

Medalists
1st place, gold medalist(s)		Francesca Lollobrigida	Italy
2nd place, silver medalist(s)		Merel Conijn	Netherlands
3rd place, bronze medalist(s)		Ragne Wiklund	Norway

The women's 5000 m competition in speed skating at the 2026 Winter Olympics was held on 12 February, at the Milano Speed Skating Stadium in Milan. Francesca Lollobrigida of Italy won the event, her second gold medal at these Games. Merel Conijn of the Netherlands won the silver medal, her first Olympic medal, and Ragne Wiklund of Norway won bronze.

== Background ==
The 2022 champion, Irene Schouten, retired from competitions. The silver, Isabelle Weidemann, and the bronze medalist, Martina Sáblíková, qualified for the Olympics. Before the Olympics, Ragne Wiklund was leading the long-distance standings of the 2025–26 ISU Speed Skating World Cup. Francesca Lollobrigida was the 5000m 2025 World Champion.

== Records ==
Prior to this competition, the existing world, Olympic and track records were as follows.

World record	Natalya Voronina (RUS)	6:39.02	Salt Lake City, United States	15 February 2020
Olympic record	Irene Schouten (NED)	6:43.51	Beijing, China	10 February 2022
Track record				

== Results ==
Rank	Pair	Lane	Name	Country	Time	Time behind	Notes
1st place, gold medalist(s)	6	I	Francesca Lollobrigida	Italy	6:46.17		
2nd place, silver medalist(s)	4	O	Merel Conijn	Netherlands	6:46.27	+0.10	
3rd place, bronze medalist(s)	5	O	Ragne Wiklund	Norway	6:46.34	+0.17	
4	4	I	Sandrine Tas	Belgium	6:46.47	+0.30	
5	5	I	Isabelle Weidemann	Canada	6:50.08	+3.91	
6	2	O	Maryna Zuyeva	Individual Neutral Athletes	6:57.70	+11.53	
7	1	I	Marijke Groenewoud	Netherlands	6:58.33	+12.16	
8	3	O	Maira Jasch	Germany	7:00.94	+14.77	
9	2	I	Laura Hall	Canada	7:02.90	+16.73	
10	3	I	Nadezhda Morozova	Kazakhstan	7:04.81	+18.64	
11	6	O	Martina Sáblíková	Czech Republic	7:07.08	+20.91	
12	1	O	Tai Zhien	China	7:15.71	+29.54	
