= 2022 World Allround Speed Skating Championships – Women =

Women at the 2022 World Allround Speed Skating Championships
- Venue: Vikingskipet
- Location: Hamar, Norway
- Dates: 5–6 March
- Competitors: 18 from 9 nations
- Winning points: 158.974

Medalists
gold medal	Irene Schouten	Netherlands
silver medal	Miho Takagi	Japan
bronze medal	Antoinette de Jong	Netherlands

The Women's competition at the 2022 World Allround Speed Skating Championships was held on 5 and 6 March 2022.

== Results ==
=== 500 m ===
The race was started on 5 March at 14:00.

Rank	Pair	Lane	Name	Country	Time	Diff
1	8	I	Miho Takagi	Japan	38.31	
2	3	O	Ayano Sato	Japan	38.49	+0.18
3	2	I	Nadezhda Morozova	Kazakhstan	38.59	+0.28
4	1	O	Nana Takagi	Japan	38.71	+0.40
5	9	I	Antoinette de Jong	Netherlands	38.81	+0.50
6	2	O	Ivanie Blondin	Canada	38.97	+0.66
7	9	O	Irene Schouten	Netherlands	39.24	+0.93
8	3	I	Valérie Maltais	Canada	39.49	+1.18
9	7	I	Ragne Wiklund	Norway	39.59	+1.28
10	6	I	Francesca Lollobrigida	Italy	39.65	+1.34
11	6	O	Merel Conijn	Netherlands	39.68	+1.38
12	7	O	Martina Sáblíková	Czech Republic	40.60	+2.29
13	8	O	Mia Kilburg	United States	41.05	+2.74
14	4	O	Leia Behlau	Germany	41.45	+3.14
15	1	I	Claudia Pechstein	Germany	41.50	+3.19
16	5	I	Lindsey Kent	Canada	41.56	+3.25
17	4	I	Sofie Karoline Haugen	Norway	41.91	+3.60
18	5	O	Zuzana Kuršová	Czech Republic	43.03	+4.72

=== 3000 m ===
The race was started on 5 March at 15:05.

Rank	Pair	Lane	Name	Country	Time	Diff
1	6	I	Irene Schouten	Netherlands	3:58.00; TR	
2	7	I	Antoinette de Jong	Netherlands	4:00.90	+2.90
3	9	O	Ragne Wiklund	Norway	4:01.16	+3.16
4	8	I	Martina Sáblíková	Czech Republic	4:01.50	+3.50
5	6	O	Miho Takagi	Japan	4:02.73	+4.73
6	5	O	Merel Conijn	Netherlands	4:03.00	+5.00
7	9	I	Francesca Lollobrigida	Italy	4:04.30	+6.30
8	7	O	Nana Takagi	Japan	4:06.31	+8.31
9	3	O	Valérie Maltais	Canada	4:08.23	+10.23
10	2	O	Ayano Sato	Japan	4:09.67	+11.67
11	8	O	Ivanie Blondin	Canada	4:10.73	+12.73
12	5	I	Nadezhda Morozova	Kazakhstan	4:11.02	+13.02
13	3	I	Sofie Karoline Haugen	Norway	4:15.83	+17.83
14	4	O	Claudia Pechstein	Germany	4:16.26	+18.26
15	4	I	Mia Kilburg	United States	4:16.63	+18.63
16	2	I	Leia Behlau	Germany	4:20.13	+22.13
17	1	O	Lindsey Kent	Canada	4:23.61	+25.61
18	1	I	Zuzana Kuršová	Czech Republic	4:34.46	+36.46

=== 1500 m ===
The race was started on 6 March at 13:59.

Rank	Pair	Lane	Name	Country	Time	Diff
1	9	I	Miho Takagi	Japan	1:55.03	
2	7	I	Ragne Wiklund	Norway	1:55.18	+0.15
2	8	I	Antoinette de Jong	Netherlands	1:55.18	+0.15
4	6	I	Merel Conijn	Netherlands	1:56.24	+1.21
5	9	O	Irene Schouten	Netherlands	1:56.43	+1.40
6	8	O	Nana Takagi	Japan	1:56.49	+1.46
7	7	O	Ayano Sato	Japan	1:57.06	+2.03
8	4	I	Martina Sáblíková	Czech Republic	1:57.28	+2.25
9	4	O	Valérie Maltais	Canada	1:58.09	+3.06
10	5	I	Nadezhda Morozova	Kazakhstan	1:58.23	+3.20
11	5	O	Ivanie Blondin	Canada	1:58.74	+3.71
12	3	I	Mia Kilburg	United States	2:01.90	+6.87
13	2	O	Leia Behlau	Germany	2:03.21	+8.18
14	2	I	Sofie Karoline Haugen	Norway	2:03.71	+8.68
15	3	O	Claudia Pechstein	Germany	2:04.43	+9.40
16	1	I	Lindsey Kent	Canada	2:04.98	+9.90
17	1	O	Zuzana Kuršová	Czech Republic	2:07.08	+12.05
—	6	O	Francesca Lollobrigida	Italy	Withdrawn	

=== 5000 m ===
The race was started on 6 March at 15:30.

Rank	Pair	Lane	Name	Country	Time	Diff
1	1	O	Martina Sáblíková	Czech Republic	6:51.75	
2	3	I	Irene Schouten	Netherlands	6:52.58	+0.83
3	3	O	Ragne Wiklund	Norway	6:56.82	+5.07
4	4	I	Miho Takagi	Japan	7:01.97	+10.22
5	4	O	Antoinette de Jong	Netherlands	7:04.45	+12.70
6	2	O	Merel Conijn	Netherlands	7:05.47	+13.72
7	2	I	Nana Takagi	Japan	7:14.41	+22.66
8	1	I	Ayano Sato	Japan	7:21.01	+29.26

=== Overall standings ===
After all races.

Rank	Name	Country	Points	Diff
1st place, gold medalist(s)	Irene Schouten	Netherlands	158.974	
2nd place, silver medalist(s)	Miho Takagi	Japan	159.305	
3rd place, bronze medalist(s)	Antoinette de Jong	Netherlands	159.798	
4	Ragne Wiklund	Norway	159.858	
5	Martina Sáblíková	Czech Republic	161.118	
6	Merel Conijn	Netherlands	161.473	
7	Nana Takagi	Japan	162.032	
8	Ayano Sato	Japan	163.222	
9	Nadezhda Morozova	Kazakhstan	119.836	
10	Valérie Maltais	Canada	120.225	
11	Ivanie Blondin	Canada	120.338	
12	Mia Kilburg	United States	124.455	
13	Claudia Pechstein	Germany	125.686	
14	Sofie Karoline Haugen	Norway	125.785	
15	Leia Behlau	Germany	125.875	
16	Lindsey Kent	Canada	127.138	
17	Zuzana Kuršová	Czech Republic	131.133	
—	Francesca Lollobrigida	Italy	Withdrawn	
