= 2023 KNSB Dutch Single Distance Championships – Women's mass start =

Dutch speed skating competition

2023 KNSB Dutch Single Distance Championships – Women's Mass Start
- Venue: Thialf, Heerenveen
- Dates: 5 February 2023
- Competitors: 20 skaters

Medalist women
1st place, gold medalist(s)		Irene Schouten	NED
2nd place, silver medalist(s)		Marijke Groenewoud	NED
3rd place, bronze medalist(s)		Evelien Vijn	NED

The women's Mass Start at the 2023 KNSB Dutch Single Distance Championships in Heerenveen took place at Thialf ice skating rink on Sunday 5 February 2023. There were 20 participants who competed over 16 laps. Skaters Irene Schouten and Marijke Groenewoud qualified for the 2023 ISU World Speed Skating Championships in Heerenveen.

== Result ==
Position	Skater	Laps	Points	Time
1st place, gold medalist(s)	Irene Schouten	16	69	8:24.4
2nd place, silver medalist(s)	Marijke Groenewoud	16	40	8:28.01
3rd place, bronze medalist(s)	Elisa Dul	16	20	8:28.22
4	Esther Kiel	16	10	8:28.28
5	Robin Groot	16	6	8:28.42
6	Lian van Loon	16	3	8:30.65
7	Tjilde Bennis	16	3	8:33.90
8	Patricia Koot	16	2	8:33.49
9	Evelien Vijn	16	2	8:34.02
10	Maaike Verweij	16	2	8:43.49
11	Paulien Verhaar	16	0	8:30.80
12	Eline Jansen	16	0	8:30.87
13	Bente Kerkhoff	16	0	8:32.19
14	Lisanne Buurman	16	0	8:33.14
15	Femke Mossinkoff	16	0	8:33.21
16	Vera van Ditshuizen	16	0	8:34.79
17	Anna Marit Sybrandi	16	0	8:35.19
18	Lidia Tempert	16	0	8:41.88
NC	Merel Conijn			WDR
NC	Sanne in ‘t Hof			WDR

- WDR = Withdrew
- NC = No classification

Referee: Bjórn Fetlaar. Assistant: Wycher Bos. Starter: Marco Hesslink
