= 2023 KNSB Dutch Single Distance Championships – Women's 3000 m =

Dutch speed skating competition

- Venue: Thialf, Heerenveen
- Dates: 4 February 2023
- Competitors: 16 skaters

Medalist women
1st place, gold medalist(s)		Antoinette Rijpma-de Jong	NED
2nd place, silver medalist(s)		Joy Beune	NED
3rd place, bronze medalist(s)		Irene Schouten	NED

The women's 3000 meter at the 2023 KNSB Dutch Single Distance Championships in Heerenveen took place at Thialf ice skating rink on Saturday 4 February 2023. There were 16 participants. Antoinette Rijpma-de Jong, Joy Beune, and Irene Schouten qualified for the 2023 ISU World Speed Skating Championships in Heerenveen.

== Statistics ==
=== Result ===
Rank	Skater	Time
1st place, gold medalist(s)	Antoinette Rijpma-de Jong	3:58.48
2nd place, silver medalist(s)	Joy Beune	3:58.65
3rd place, bronze medalist(s)	Irene Schouten	4:02.83
4	Marijke Groenewoud	4:02.86
5	Sanne in 't Hof	4:03.53
6	Reina Anema	4:06.54
7	Robin Groot	4:06.69
8	Elisa Dul	4:08.61
9	Merel Conijn	4:08.83
10	Maaike Verweij	4:11.11
11	Paulien Verhaar	4:11.75 PR
12	Eline Jansen	4:12.60 PR
13	Aveline Hijlkema	4:12.75
14	Eline van Voorden	4:14.19 PR
15	Esther Kiel	4:15.12
16	Myrthe de Boer	4:15.23

Referee: Loretta Staring. Assistant: Miriam Kuiper. Starter: Jans Rosing

=== Draw ===
Heat	Outer lane	Inner lane
1	Paulien Verhaar	Myrthe de Boer
2	Eline van Voorden	Eline Jansen
3	Esther Kiel	Elisa Dul
4	Maaike Verweij	Aveline Hijlkema
5	Reina Anema	Merel Conijn
6	Joy Beune	Antoinette Rijpma-de Jong
7	Marijke Groenewoud	Robin Groot
8	Sanne in 't Hof	Irene Schouten
