= 2022 KNSB Dutch Single Distance Championships – Women's mass start =

Dutch speed skating competition

2022 KNSB Dutch Single Distance Championships – Women's Mass Start
- Venue: Thialf, Heerenveen
- Dates: 31 October 2021
- Competitors: 25 skaters

Medalist women
1st place, gold medalist(s)		Irene Schouten	NED
2nd place, silver medalist(s)		Marijke Groenewoud	NED
3rd place, bronze medalist(s)		Evelien Vijn	NED

The women's Mass Start at the 2022 KNSB Dutch Single Distance Championships in Heerenveen took place at Thialf ice skating rink on Sunday 31 October 2021. Although the tournament was held in 2021 it was the 2022 edition as it was part of the 2021–2022 speed skating season. There were 25 participants.

== Result ==
Position	Skater	Rounds	Points sprint 1	Points sprint 2	Points sprint 3	Points finish	Points total	Time
1st place, gold medalist(s)	Irene Schouten	16		2		60	62	8:19.57
2nd place, silver medalist(s)	Marijke Groenewoud	16			2	40	42	8:19.66
3rd place, bronze medalist(s)	Evelien Vijn	16	1		1	20	22	8:20.68
4	Robin Groot	16				10	10	8:21.00
5	Gioya Lancee	16				6	6	8:21.03
6	Bianca Bakker	16				3	3	8:21.92
7	Esther Kiel	16			3		3	8:23.46
8	Maaike Verweij	16	3				3	8:24.42
9	Tjilde Bennis	16	2				2	8:22.22
10	Melissa Wijfje	16		1			1	8:40.45
11	Merel Conijn	16					0	8:22.30
12	Eline Jansen	16					0	8:22.38
13	Jade Van der Molen	16					0	8:22.83
14	Hilde Noppert	16					0	8:23.03
15	Femke Mossinkoff	16					0	8:23.42
16	Nienke Smit	16					0	8:23.51
17	Jessica Merkens	16					0	8:23.77
18	Evi Gelling	16					0	8:24.64
19	Lisanne Buurman	16					0	8:27.03
20	Brit Qualm	16					0	8:28.76
21	Floor Peters	16					0	8:41.17
22	Maya de Jong	15		3			0	8:31.16
23	Corina Dijkstra	15					0	8:33.21
24	Olin Verhoog	14					0	7:53.70
25	Myrthe de Boer	3					0	1:52.18
26	Elisa Dul	0					0	DNS
27	Esmee Visser	0					0	DNS

Referee: Dina Melis. Starter: Janny Smegen
Start: 17:38.00 hr. Finish: 17:47.25 hr.
