= 2020–21 ISU Speed Skating World Cup – World Cup 2 =

The second and last competition weekend of the 2020–21 ISU Speed Skating World Cup was held at Thialf in Heerenveen, the Netherlands, from Friday, 29 January, until Sunday, 31 January 2021.

== Medal summary ==
=== Men's events ===
Event	Gold	Time	Silver	Time	Bronze	Time	Report
500 m (1)	Pavel Kulizhnikov; Russia	34.475	Laurent Dubreuil; Canada	34.520	Dai Dai Ntab; Netherlands; Artem Arefyev; Russia	34.588	
500 m (2)	Ronald Mulder; Netherlands	34.555	Hein Otterspeer; Netherlands	34.590	Laurent Dubreuil; Canada	34.594	
1000 m	Kai Verbij; Netherlands	1:07.355	Thomas Krol; Netherlands	1:07.581	Laurent Dubreuil; Canada	1:08.185	
1500 m	Thomas Krol; Netherlands	1:43.428	Kjeld Nuis; Netherlands	1:44.222	Patrick Roest; Netherlands	1:44.758	
5000 m	Patrick Roest; Netherlands	6:05.959	Nils van der Poel; Sweden	6:08.393; NR	Sergey Trofimov; Russia	6:10.864	
Mass start^{A}	Jorrit Bergsma; Netherlands	63	Bart Swings; Belgium	40	Livio Wenger; Switzerland	22	
Team pursuit	Norway; Sverre Lunde Pedersen; Allan Dahl Johansson; Hallgeir Engebråten	3:39.080; TR	Canada; Ted-Jan Bloemen; Jordan Belchos; Connor Howe	3:39.943	Russia; Danila Semerikov; Sergey Trofimov; Daniil Aldoshkin	3:41.400	

^{A} In mass start, race points are accumulated during the race based on results of the intermediate sprints and the final sprint. The skater with most race points is the winner.

=== Women's events ===
Event	Gold	Time	Silver	Time	Bronze	Time	Report
500 m (1)	Femke Kok; Netherlands	37.233	Angelina Golikova; Russia	37.290	Vanessa Herzog; Austria	37.409	
500 m (2)	Femke Kok; Netherlands	37.333	Angelina Golikova; Russia	37.372	Daria Kachanova; Russia	37.637	
1000 m	Brittany Bowe; United States	1:13.960	Angelina Golikova; Russia	1:14.054	Femke Kok; Netherlands	1:14.475	
1500 m	Brittany Bowe; United States	1:53.455	Antoinette de Jong; Netherlands	1:53.813	Ireen Wüst; Netherlands	1:54.228	
3000 m	Natalia Voronina; Russia	3:56.853; TR	Antoinette de Jong; Netherlands	3:58.908	Irene Schouten; Netherlands	4:00.153	
Mass start^{A}	Irene Schouten; Netherlands	60	Ivanie Blondin; Canada	41	Elizaveta Golubeva; Russia	10	
Team pursuit	Canada; Ivanie Blondin; Isabelle Weidemann; Valerie Maltais	2:54.640; TR	Netherlands; Ireen Wüst; Irene Schouten; Antoinette de Jong	2:55.585	Norway; Ida Njåtun; Marit Fjellanger Bøhm; Ragne Wiklund	2:58.229	

^{A} In mass start, race points are accumulated during the race based on results of the intermediate sprints and the final sprint. The skater with most race points is the winner.
