= List of Irish records in speed skating =

The following are the national records in speed skating in Ireland, maintained by Ice Skating Association of Ireland (ISAI).

== Men ==
Event	Record	Athlete	Date	Meet	Place	Ref
500 meters	42.90	Rory McCarthy	20 March 2022		Heerenveen, Netherlands	
500 meters × 2						
1000 meters	1:30.73	Rory McCarthy	20 November 2021		Tilburg, Netherlands	
1500 meters	2:17.78	Paul Fitzgerald	17 March 2001	Olympic Oval Finale	Calgary, Canada	
3000 meters	4:43.12	Paul Fitzgerald	20 March 2003	Olympic Oval Finale	Calgary, Canada	
5000 meters	7:59.44	Paul Fitzgerald	11 March 2005	Olympic Oval Finale	Calgary, Canada	
10000 meters	16:42.75	Paul Fitzgerald	22 March 2005		Heerenveen, Netherlands	
Team pursuit (8 laps)						
Sprint combination						
Small combination						
Big combination						

== Women ==
Event	Record	Athlete	Date	Meet	Place	Ref
500 meters	43.10	Tara Donoghue	5 January 2019	Schaatscircuit	Heerenveen, Netherlands	
500 meters × 2						
1000 meters	1:24.29	Tara Donoghue	2 March 2019	Viking Race	Heerenveen, Netherlands	
1500 meters	2:07.97	Clare Scanlon	24 February 2007	World Masters Championships	Calgary, Canada	
3000 meters	4:29.54	Tara Donoghue	22 February 2020	World Junior Championships	Tomaszów Mazowiecki, Poland	
5000 meters	8:04.98	Tara Donoghue	2 February 2020		Haarlem, Netherlands	
10000 meters						
Team pursuit (6 laps)						
Sprint combination						
Mini combination						
Small combination						
