= 2014 KNSB Dutch Allround Championships =

Sport season from dutch

- Venue: Olympic Stadium, Amsterdam
- Dates: 28 February – 2 March 2014

Medalist men
| 1st place, gold medalist(s) | | Koen Verweij | NED |
| 2nd place, silver medalist(s) | | Renz Rotteveel | NED |
| 3rd place, bronze medalist(s) | | Wouter olde Heuvel | NED |

Medalist women
| 1st place, gold medalist(s) | | Yvonne Nauta | NED |
| 2nd place, silver medalist(s) | | Diane Valkenburg | NED |
| 3rd place, bronze medalist(s) | | Irene Schouten | NED |

The 2014 KNSB Dutch Allround Championships in speed skating were held at the Olympic Stadium ice stadium in Amsterdam, Netherlands from 28 February to 2 March 2014. The tournament was part of the 2013–2014 speed skating season. Koen Verweij and Yvonne Nauta won the allround titles.

== Schedule ==
| Friday 28 February | Saturday 1 March | Sunday 2 March |
|---|---|---|
| 500 meter women allround 500 meter men allround | 3000 meter women allround 5000 meter men allround | 1500 meter women allround 1500 meter men allround 5000 meter women allround 10,000 meter men allround |

== Medalists ==
=== Allround ===
| Event | Gold | | Silver | | Bronze | |
|---|---|---|---|---|---|---|
| Men's allround | Koen Verweij | 154,702 | Renz Rotteveel | 157,257 | Wouter olde Heuvel | 158,229 |
| Women's allround | Yvonne Nauta | 170,022 | Diane Valkenburg | 170,357 | Irene Schouten | 171,309 |

=== Distance ===
| Distance | Gold | | Silver | | Bronze | |
|---|---|---|---|---|---|---|
| Men's 500 m | Koen Verweij | 36.36 | Lucas van Alphen | 36.69 | Wouter olde Heuvel | 37.15 |
| Men's 1500 m | Koen Verweij | 1:49.92 | Renz Rotteveel | 1:51.28 | Rhian Ket | 1:52.17 |
| Men's 5000 m | Koen Verweij | 6:35.16 | Arjen van der Kieft | 6:42.46 | Renz Rotteveel | 6:42.62 |
| Men's 10000 m | Arjen van der Kieft | 13:57.67 | Koen Verweij | 14:03.72 | Renz Rotteveel | 14:10.04 |
| Women's 500 m | Jorien Voorhuis | 40.49 | Marije Joling | 40.80 | Annouk van der Weijden | 40.88 |
| Women's 1500 m | Diane Valkenburg | 2:03.45 | Irene Schouten | 2:05.25 | Yvonne Nauta | 2:05.30 |
| Women's 3000 m | Yvonne Nauta | 4:14.00 | Diane Valkenburg | 4:17.47 | Irene Schouten | 4:18.34 |
| Women's 5000 m | Yvonne Nauta | 7:21.53 | Diane Valkenburg | 7:28.16 | Irene Schouten | 7:28.23 |

== Classification ==
=== Men's allround ===
| Position | Skater | Total points Samalog | 500m | 5000m | 1500m | 10,000m |
|---|---|---|---|---|---|---|
| 1st place, gold medalist(s) | Koen Verweij | 154.702 TR | 36.36 (1) TR | 6:35.16 (1) | 1:49.92 (1) TR | 14:03.72 (2) |
| 2nd place, silver medalist(s) | Renz Rotteveel | 157.257 | 37.40 (6) | 6:42.62 (3) | 1:51.28 (2) | 14:10.04 (3) |
| 3rd place, bronze medalist(s) | Wouter Olde Heuvel | 158.229 | 37.17 (3) | 6:45.92 (5) | 1:53.00 (4) | 14.16.43 (5) |
| 4 | Thom van Beek | 160.195 | 38.42 (17) | 6:49.43 (6) | 1:54.67 (10) | 14:12.19 (4) |
| 5 | Lucas van Alphen | 160.624 | 36.69 (2) | 6:59.59 (12) | 1:53.88 (6) | 14:40.31 (6) |
| 6 | Frank Hermans | 161.664 | 37.88 (14) | 6:52.28 (7) | 1:55.33 (12) | 14:42.26 (7) |
| 7 | Arjen van der Kieft | 162.622 | 40.80 (23) | 6:42.46 (2) | 1:59.08 (21) | 13.57.67 (1) TR |
| 8 | Rhian Ket | 117.072 | 37.27 (5) | 7:04.12 (13) | 1:52.17 (3) | |
| 9 | Jos de Vos | 177.683 | 38.10 (15) | 6:56.27 (10) | 1:53.87 (5) | |
| NC | Christijn Groeneveld | 117.734 | 39.22 (21) | 6:44.74 (4) | 1:54.12 (8) | DSQ |
| 11 | Peter Groen | 118.064 | 37.45 (7) | 7:05.08 (14) | 1:54.32 (9) | |
| 12 | Jorjan Jorritsma | 118.151 | 37.83 (12) | 6:54.58 (8) | 1:56.59 (14) | |
| 13 | Ted-Jan Bloemen | 118.289 | 37.83 (12) | 6:55.99 (9) | 1:56.58 (13) | |
| 14 | Kees Heemskerk | 119.365 | 37.74 (11) | 7:12.12 (16) | 1:55.24 (11) | |
| 15 | Pim Cazemier | 119.621 | 38.47 (19) | 6:57.88 (11) | 1:58.09 (15) | |
| 16 | Dedjer Wymenga | 120.836 | 37.46 (8) | 719.73 (20) | 1:58.21 (16) | |
| 17 | Tom Terpstra | 121.666 | 38.43 (18) | 7:17.86 (19) | 1:58.35 (17) | |
| 18 | Luuc Bugter | 121.833 | 39.33 (22) | 7:10.27 (15) | 1:58.43 (18) | |
| 19 | Sebastiaan Oranje | 122.230 | 39.01 (20) | 7:16.87 (18) | 1:58.60 (19) | |
| 20 | Remon Kwant | 123.010 | 38.18 (16) | 7:31.84 (21) | 1:58.94 (20) | |
| 21 | Jeffrey van Norden | 146.838 | 1:03.16 (24) | 7:16.48 (17) | 2:00.09 (22) | |
| NC | Douwe de Vries | 75.736 | 37.70 (9) | DSQ | 1:54.11 (7) | |
| NC | Sven Kramer | 37.710 | 37.17 (4) | DSQ | WDR | |
| NC | Maurice Vriend | 37.720 | 37.72 (10) | DNS | | |

=== Women's allround ===
| Position | Skater | Total points Samalog | 500m | 3000m | 1500m | 5000m |
|---|---|---|---|---|---|---|
| 1st place, gold medalist(s) | Yvonne Nauta | 170.022 TR | 41.77 (8) | 4:14.00 (1) TR | 2:05.30 (3) | 7:21.53 (1) TR |
| 2nd place, silver medalist(s) | Diane Valkenburg | 170.357 | 41.48 (5) | 4:17.47 (2) | 2:03.45 (1) TR | 7:28.16 (2) |
| 3rd place, bronze medalist(s) | Irene Schouten | 171.309 | 41.68 (7) | 4:18.34 (3) | 2:05.25 (2) | 7:28.23 (3) |
| 4 | Jorien Voorhuis | 171.312 | 40.49 (1) | 4:19.60 (6) | 2:06.61 (7) | 7:33.53 (4) |
| 5 | Linda de Vries | 172.340 | 41.55 (6) | 4:18.54 (4) | 2:05.51 (4) | 7:38.64 (5) |
| 6 | Annouk van der Weijden | 172.853 | 40.88 (3) | 4:19.37 (5) | 2:07.47 (8) | 7:42.55 (6) |
| 7 | Carlijn Achtereekte | 173.799 | 40.99 (4) | 4:23.92 (9) | 2:07.51 (9) | 7:43.20 (7) |
| 8 | Marije Joling | 126.247 | 40.80 (2) | 4:20.77 (7) | 2:05.96 (5) | DSQ |
| 9 | Reina Anema | 128.266 | 41.88 (10) | 4:26.28 (10) | 2:06.02 (6) | |
| 10 | Pien Keulstra | 128.549 | 42.06 (11) | 4:22.76 (8) | 2:08.09 (10) | |
| 11 | Miranda Dekker | 130.123 | 42.15 (13) | 4:28.32 (11) | 2:09.76 (11) | |
| 12 | Julia Berentschot | 131.251 | 41.81 (9) | 4:35.65 (13) | 2:10.50 (15) | |
| 13 | Sanne van der Schaar | 131.476 | 42.18 (14) | 4:35.48 (12) | 2:10.15 (12) | |
| 14 | Maike Brinksma | 132.282 | 42.21 (15) | 4:40.06 (15) | 2:10.19 (13) | |
| 15 | Natasja Roest | 132.574 | 42.08 (12) | 4:41.99 (16) | 2:10.49 (14) | |
| 16 | Paulien Westerhof | 133.619 | 42.30 (16) | 4:43.88 (17) | 2:12.02 (17) | |
| 17 | Ellen van Vroonhoven | 133.844 | 43.31 (19) | 4:38.35 (14) | 2:12.43 (16) | |
| 18 | Marleen de Kroon | 134.398 | 42.39 (17) | 4:45.89 (18) | 2:13.08 (19) | |
| 19 | Stephanie Bunte | 136.318 | 43.62 (20) | 4:46.95 (19) | 2:14.62 (20) | |
| NC | Mirjam Rottier | 87.003 | 43.07 (18) | DSQ | 2:11.80 (16) | |
