= 2022 KNSB Dutch Single Distance Championships – Women's 3000 m =

Dutch speed skating competition

- Venue: Thialf, Heerenveen
- Dates: 30 October 2021
- Competitors: 20 skaters

Medalist women
1st place, gold medalist(s)		Irene Schouten	NED
2nd place, silver medalist(s)		Antoinette de Jong	NED
3rd place, bronze medalist(s)		Carlijn Achtereekte	NED

The women's 3000 meter at the 2022 KNSB Dutch Single Distance Championships in Heerenveen took place at Thialf ice skating rink on Saturday 30 October 2021. Although the tournament was held in 2021 it was the 2022 edition as it was part of the 2021–2022 speed skating season. There were 20 participants. The first 5 skaters were eligible for the following World Cup tournaments

== Statistics ==
=== Result ===
Rank	Skater	Time
1st place, gold medalist(s)	Irene Schouten	3:54.59 PR TR
2nd place, silver medalist(s)	Antoinette de Jong	4:00.83
3rd place, bronze medalist(s)	Carlijn Achtereekte	4:02.16
4	Joy Beune	4:02.71
5	Ireen Wüst	4:03.01
6	Melissa Wijfje	4:03.57
7	Merel Conijn	4:04.05 PR
8	Reina Anema	4:04.45
9	Sanne in 't Hof	4:05.04 PR
10	Aveline Hijlkema	4:05.68 PR
11	Robin Groot	4:05.93 PR
12	Esmee Visser	4:07.46
13	Esther Kiel	4:10.55
14	Jade Groenewoud	4:12.01 PR
15	Aveline Hijlkema	4:12.58
16	Leonie Bats	4:13.21 PR
17	Sanne in 't Hof	4:13.49 PR
18	Sterre Jonkers	4:13.94
19	Eline Jansen	4:15.81 PR
20	Sophia Kraaijeveld	4:18.27 PR

Referee: Berri de Jong. Assistant: Suzan van den Belt. Starter: Marco Hesselink
Start: 16:42.00 hr. Finish: 17:35.39 hr.

=== Draw ===
Heat	Inner lane	Outer lane
1	Sophia Kraaijeveld	Kim Talsma
2	Sterre Jonkers	Leonie Bats
3	Esther Kiel	Eline Jansen
4	Jade Groenewoud	Robin Groot
5	Esmee Visser	Merel Conijn
6	Aveline Hijlkema	Aveline Hijlkema
7	Sanne in 't Hof	Ireen Wüst
8	Irene Schouten	Carlijn Achtereekte
9	Joy Beune	Reina Anema
10	Melissa Wijfje	Antoinette de Jong
