= 2013 KNSB Dutch Single Distance Championships – Men's 1500 m =

Dutch speed skating competition

- Venue: Thialf, Heerenveen
- Dates: 10 November 2012
- Competitors: 24 skaters

Medalist men
1st place, gold medalist(s)		Kjeld Nuis	NED
2nd place, silver medalist(s)		Renz Rotteveel	NED
3rd place, bronze medalist(s)		Maurice Vriend	NED

The men's 1500 meter at the 2013 KNSB Dutch Single Distance Championships took place in Heerenveen at the Thialf ice skating rink on Saturday 10 November 2012. Although this tournament was held in 2012 it was part of the speed skating season 2012–2013. There were 24 participants.

== Statistics ==
=== Result ===
Position	Skater	Time
1st place, gold medalist(s)	Kjeld Nuis	1:46.74
2nd place, silver medalist(s)	Renz Rotteveel	1:47.22
3rd place, bronze medalist(s)	Maurice Vriend	1:47.66
4	Rhian Ket	1:47.76(1)
4	Thomas Krol	1:47.76(1)
6	Lucas van Alphen	1:48.02
7	Pim Schipper	1:48.35
8	Sjoerd de Vries	1:48.55
9	Ted-Jan Bloemen	1:48.59
10	Jan Blokhuijsen	1:48.77(5)
11	Frank Hermans	1:48.77(6)
12	Kai Verbij	1:49.33
13	Jos de Vos	1:49.42
14	Thom van Beek	1:49.64
15	Pim Cazemier	1:49.84
16	Bart van den Berg	1:50.49
17	Remco Olde Heuvel	1:50.95
18	Rienk Nauta	1:51.16
19	Paul-Yme Brunsmann	1:51.22
20	Dedjer Wymenga	1:52.01
21	Adriaan van Velde	1:52.11
22	Pepijn van der Vinne	1:54.57
DNF	Thijs Roozen	DNF fell
DQ	Koen Verweij	DQ

=== Draw ===
Heat	Inside lane	Outside lane
1	Pepijn van der Vinne	Paul-Yme Brunsmann
2	Bart van den Berg	Dedjer Wymenga
3	Adriaan van Velde	Rienk Nauta
4	Thijs Roozen	Jos de Vos
5	Pim Cazemier	Thom van Beek
6	Thomas Krol	Kai Verbij
7	Renz Rotteveel	Frank Hermans
8	Lucas van Alphen	Ted-Jan Bloemen
9	Pim Schipper	Koen Verweij
10	Sjoerd de Vries	Remco Olde Heuvel
11	Rhian Ket	Kjeld Nuis
12	Jan Blokhuijsen	Maurice Vriend
