= 2020 KNSB Dutch Single Distance Championships – Women's 3000 m =

Dutch speed skating competition

- Venue: Thialf, Heerenveen
- Dates: 28 December 2019
- Competitors: 16 skaters

Medalist women
1st place, gold medalist(s)		Esmee Visser	NED
2nd place, silver medalist(s)		Irene Schouten	NED
3rd place, bronze medalist(s)		Carlijn Achtereekte	NED

The women's 3000 meter at the 2020 KNSB Dutch Single Distance Championships in Heerenveen took place at Thialf ice skating rink on Saturday 28 December 2019.

== Statistics ==
=== Result ===
Position	Skater	Time
1st place, gold medalist(s)	Esmee Visser	4:01.29
2nd place, silver medalist(s)	Irene Schouten	4:01.80
3rd place, bronze medalist(s)	Carlijn Achtereekte	4:02.20
4	Antoinette de Jong	4:02.23
5	Ireen Wüst	4:02.65
6	Reina Anema	4:02.67
7	Melissa Wijfje	4:03.58
8	Joy Beune	4:08.12
9	Aveline Hijlkema	4:11.19
10	Ineke Dedden	4:11.28
11	Imke Vormeer	4:11.54
12	Sterre Jonkers	4:11.55
13	Roza Blokker	4:11.72
14	Paulien Verhaar	4:12.07 PR
15	Esther Kiel	4:13.65
16	Robin Groot	4:16.12

Referee: Frank Zwitser. Assistant: Suzan van den Belt
Starter: Peter van Muiswinkel
Start: 16:58 hr. Finish: 17:39 hr.

=== Draw ===
Heat	Inner lane	Outer lane
1	Ineke Dedden	Robin Groot
2	Roza Blokker	Paulien Verhaar
3	Imke Vormeer	Irene Schouten
4	Joy Beune	Aveline Hijlkema
5	Esther Kiel	Roza Blokker
6	Carlijn Achtereekte	Melissa Wijfje
7	Ireen Wüst	Reina Anema
8	Antoinette de Jong	Esmee Visser
