= 2013 KNSB Dutch Single Distance Championships – Women's 5000 m =

- Venue: Thialf, Heerenveen, Netherlands
- Date: 11 November 2012
- Competitors: 14 skaters

Medalist men
1st place, gold medalist(s)		Marije Joling	NED
2nd place, silver medalist(s)		Diane Valkenburg	NED
3rd place, bronze medalist(s)		Rixt Meijer	NED

The women's 5000 meter at the 2013 KNSB Dutch Single Distance Championships took place in Heerenveen at the Thialf ice skating rink on Sunday 11 November 2012. Although this tournament was held in 2012, it was part of the 2012–2013 speed skating season.

There were 14 participants. There was a qualification selection incentive for the next following 2012–13 ISU Speed Skating World Cup tournaments.

Title holder was Pien Keulstra.

== Overview ==
=== Result ===
Rank	Skater	Time
1st place, gold medalist(s)	Marije Joling	7:06.03 PR
2nd place, silver medalist(s)	Diane Valkenburg	7:08.48
3rd place, bronze medalist(s)	Rixt Meijer	7:09.92 PR
4	Annouk van der Weijden	7:12.15
5	Carlijn Achtereekte	7:13.55
6	Linda de Vries	7:13.73 PR
7	Mireille Reitsma	7:15.38
8	Antoinette de Jong	7:17.63
9	Yvonne Nauta	7:18.60
10	Lisa van der Geest	7:19.37 PR
11	Mariska Huisman	7:21.31 PR
12	Jorien Voorhuis	7:21.42
13	Janneke Ensing	7:21.46
14	Elma de Vries	7:36.04

=== Draw ===
Heat	Inner lane	Outer lane
1	Mariska Huisman	Antoinette de Jong
2	Mireille Reitsma	Rixt Meijer
3	Lisa van der Geest	Elma de Vries
4	Yvonne Nauta	Carlijn Achtereekte
5	Diane Valkenburg	Janneke Ensing
6	Linda de Vries	Marije Joling
7	Jorien Voorhuis	Annouk van der Weijden
