= 2021 KNSB Dutch Single Distance Championships – Women's 5000 m =

Dutch speed skating competition

- Venue: Thialf, Heerenveen
- Dates: 1 November 2020
- Competitors: 10 skaters

Medalist women
1st place, gold medalist(s)		Irene Schouten	NED
2nd place, silver medalist(s)		Reina Anema	NED
3rd place, bronze medalist(s)		Carlijn Achtereekte	NED

The women's 5000 meter at the 2021 KNSB Dutch Single Distance Championships in Heerenveen took place at Thialf ice skating rink on Sunday 1 November 2020.

== Statistics ==
=== Result ===
Rank	Skater	Time
1st place, gold medalist(s)	Irene Schouten	6:55.94
2nd place, silver medalist(s)	Reina Anema	7:01.37
3rd place, bronze medalist(s)	Carlijn Achtereekte	7:01.62
4	Esmee Visser	7:02.06
5	Joy Beune	7:05.23
6	Melissa Wijfje	7:05.80
7	Antoinette de Jong	7:07.22
8	Merel Conijn	7:10.99 PR
9	Evelien Vijn	7:13.89
10	Ineke Dedden	7:26.81

Referee: Wycher Bos. Assistant: Björn Fetlaar
Starter: Janny Smegen
Start: 14:21 hr. Finish: 15:03 hr.

=== Draw ===
Heat	Inner lane	Outer lane
1	Evelien Vijn	Merel Conijn
2	Antoinette de Jong	Ineke Dedden
3	Joy Beune	Melissa Wijfje
4	Esmee Visser	Reina Anema
5	Carlijn Achtereekte	Irene Schouten
