= 2024 World Single Distances Speed Skating Championships – Women's 5000 metres =

Women's 5000 metres at the 2024 World Single Distances Speed Skating Championships
- Venue: Olympic Oval
- Location: Calgary, Canada
- Dates: February 18
- Competitors: 12 from 8 nations
- Winning time: 6:47.72

Medalists
gold medal	Joy Beune	Netherlands
silver medal	Irene Schouten	Netherlands
bronze medal	Martina Sáblíková	Czech Republic

The Women's 5000 metres competition at the 2024 World Single Distances Speed Skating Championships was held on February 18, 2024.

== Results ==
The race was started at 12:00.

Rank	Pair	Lane	Name	Country	Time	Diff
1st place, gold medalist(s)	5	i	Joy Beune	Netherlands	6:47.72	
2nd place, silver medalist(s)	4	i	Irene Schouten	Netherlands	6:48.98	+1.26
3rd place, bronze medalist(s)	4	o	Martina Sáblíková	Czech Republic	6:51.88	+4.16
4	5	o	Ragne Wiklund	Norway	6:52.46	+4.74
5	1	o	Isabelle Weidemann	Canada	6:55.47	+7.75
6	6	i	Valérie Maltais	Canada	7:02.61	+14.89
7	6	o	Yang Binyu	China	7:03.74	+16.02
8	2	i	Laura Lorenzato	Italy	7:04.53	+16.81
9	1	i	Momoka Horikawa	Japan	7:04.57	+16.85
10	3	i	Jin Wenjing	China	7:08.75	+21.03
11	2	o	Sofie Karoline Haugen	Norway	7:16.71	+28.99
12	3	o	Josie Hofmann	Germany	7:16.80	+29.08
