= 2022 European Speed Skating Championships – Women's 3000 metres =

Women's 3000 metres at the 2022 European Speed Skating Championships
- Venue: Thialf
- Location: Heerenveen, Netherlands
- Dates: 7 January
- Competitors: 16 from 9 nations
- Winning time: 3:56.62

Medalists
gold medal	Irene Schouten	Netherlands
silver medal	Antoinette de Jong	Netherlands
bronze medal	Francesca Lollobrigida	Italy

The women's 3000 metres competition at the 2022 European Speed Skating Championships was held on 7 January 2022.

== Results ==
The race was started at 19:42.

Rank	Pair	Lane	Name	Country	Time	Diff
1st place, gold medalist(s)	6	i	Irene Schouten	Netherlands	3:56.62	
2nd place, silver medalist(s)	7	i	Antoinette de Jong	Netherlands	3:59.79	+3.17
3rd place, bronze medalist(s)	6	o	Francesca Lollobrigida	Italy	4:00.61	+3.99
4	8	o	Ragne Wiklund	Norway	4:01.86	+5.24
5	7	o	Carlijn Achtereekte	Netherlands	4:04.79	+8.17
6	8	i	Maryna Zuyeva	Belarus	4:09.32	+12.70
7	5	i	Claudia Pechstein	Germany	4:11.60	+14.98
8	4	i	Sofie Karoline Haugen	Norway	4:12.17	+15.55
9	5	o	Leia Behlau	Germany	4:14.20	+17.58
10	3	o	Marit Fjellanger Bøhm	Norway	4:14.26	+17.64
11	3	i	Natalie Kerschbaummayr	Austria	4:17.05	+20.43
12	4	o	Magdalena Czyszczoń	Poland	4:17.15	+20.53
13	2	i	Veronika Antošová	Czech Republic	4:21.88	+25.26
14	1	o	Zuzana Kuršová	Czech Republic	4:21.91	+25.29
15	2	o	Ramona Härdi	Switzerland	4:25.38	+28.76
16	1	i	Laura Peveri	Italy	4:25.84	+29.22
