= 2021 KNSB Dutch Single Distance Championships – Women's 3000 m =

Dutch speed skating competition

- Venue: Thialf, Heerenveen
- Dates: 31 October 2020
- Competitors: 16 skaters

Medalist women
1st place, gold medalist(s)		Irene Schouten	NED
2nd place, silver medalist(s)		Reina Anema	NED
3rd place, bronze medalist(s)		Antoinette de Jong	NED

The women's 3000 meter at the 2021 KNSB Dutch Single Distance Championships in Heerenveen took place at Thialf ice skating rink on Saturday 31 October 2020.

== Statistics ==
=== Result ===
Rank	Skater	Time
1st place, gold medalist(s)	Irene Schouten	4:01.93
2nd place, silver medalist(s)	Reina Anema	4:04.28
3rd place, bronze medalist(s)	Antoinette de Jong	4:04.53
4	Carlijn Achtereekte	4:06.71
5	Ireen Wüst	4:06.82
6	Joy Beune	4:08.01
7	Merel Conijn	4:08.03 PR
8	Melissa Wijfje	4:08.27
9	Evelien Vijn	4:08.81
10	Esther Kiel	4:09.41
11	Esmee Visser	4:09.55
12	Aveline Hijlkema	4:09.77
13	Sanne in 't Hof	4:12.47
14	Roza Blokker	4:13.43
15	Sterre Jonkers	4:17.66
16	Ineke Dedden	4:18.54

Referee: Wycher Bos. Assistant: Björn Fetlaar.
Starter: Raymond Micka

=== Draw ===
Heat	Inner lane	Outer lane
1	Ineke Dedden	Sterre Jonkers
2	Aveline Hijlkema	Merel Conijn
3	Ireen Wüst	Joy Beune
4	Evelien Vijn	Sanne in 't Hof
5	Esther Kiel	Roza Blokker
6	Irene Schouten	Carlijn Achtereekte
7	Esmee Visser	Melissa Wijfje
8	Antoinette de Jong	Reina Anema
