= 2019 KNSB Dutch Single Distance Championships – Women's 3000 m =

- Venue: Thialf, Heerenveen, Netherlands
- Date: 29 December 2018
- Competitors: 18 skaters

Medalist men
1st place, gold medalist(s)		Antoinette de Jong	NED
2nd place, silver medalist(s)		Ireen Wüst	NED
3rd place, bronze medalist(s)		Carlijn Achtereekte	NED

The women's 3000 meter at the 2019 KNSB Dutch Single Distance Championships took place in Heerenveen at the Thialf ice skating rink on Saturday 29 December 2018. Although this tournament was held in 2018, it was part of the 2018–2019 speed skating season.

There were 18 participants.

Title holder was Antoinette de Jong.

== Overview ==
=== Result ===
Rank	Skater	Time
1st place, gold medalist(s)	Antoinette de Jong	4:00.64
2nd place, silver medalist(s)	Ireen Wüst	4:01.29
3rd place, bronze medalist(s)	Carlijn Achtereekte	4:01.77
4	Esmee Visser	4:01.98
5	Carien Kleibeuker	4:04.92
6	Joy Beune	4:05.47
7	Melissa Wijfje	4:05.59
8	Ineke Dedden	4:07.12 PR
9	Aveline Hijlkema	4:08.57 PR
10	Imke Vormeer	4:09.39 PR
11	Yvonne Nauta	4:09.41
12	Irene Schouten	4:09.60
13	Sanne in 't Hof	4:10.45 PR
14	Lotte van Beek	4:10.68
15	Roza Blokker	4:11.59
16	Robin Groot	4:16.04
17	Esther Kiel	4:16.52
–	Reina Anema	DQ

DQ = Disqualified

=== Draw ===
Heat	Inner lane	Outer lane
1	Lotte van Beek	Robin Groot
2	Aveline Hijlkema	Yvonne Nauta
3	Sanne in 't Hof	Esther Kiel
4	Ineke Dedden	Imke Vormeer
5	Roza Blokker	Irene Schouten
6	Carien Kleibeuker	Joy Beune
7	Reina Anema	Carlijn Achtereekte
8	Esmee Visser	Antoinette de Jong
9	Ireen Wüst	Melissa Wijfje
