= 2020 European Speed Skating Championships – Women's mass start =

Women's mass start at the 2020 European Speed Skating Championships
- Venue: Thialf
- Location: Heerenveen, Netherlands
- Dates: 12 January
- Competitors: 18 from 10 nations
- Winning points: 62

Medalists
gold medal	Irene Schouten	Netherlands
silver medal	Francesca Lollobrigida	Italy
bronze medal	Melissa Wijfje	Netherlands

The women's mass start competition at the 2020 European Speed Skating Championships was held on 12 January 2020.

== Results ==
The race was started at 17:02.

Rank	Name	Country	Points	Time
1st place, gold medalist(s)	Irene Schouten	Netherlands	62	8:23.37
2nd place, silver medalist(s)	Francesca Lollobrigida	Italy	41	8:23.80
3rd place, bronze medalist(s)	Melissa Wijfje	Netherlands	22	8:23.98
4	Elizaveta Kazelina	Russia	10	8:23.99
5	Noemi Bonazza	Italy	6	8:24.84
6	Karolina Bosiek	Poland	3	8:25.60
7	Michelle Uhrig	Germany	3	8:26.75
8	Claudia Pechstein	Germany	3	8:26.94
9	Maryna Zuyeva	Belarus	3	8:27.05
10	Evgeniia Lalenkova	Russia	2	8:26.96
11	Saskia Alusalu	Estonia	2	8:37.45
12	Magdalena Czyszczoń	Poland	0	8:34.40
13	Tatsiana Mikhailava	Belarus	0	8:34.57
14	Nadja Wenger	Switzerland	0	8:39.55
15	Anke Vos	Belgium	0	8:46.50
16	Ellia Smeding	Great Britain	0	8:47.09
17	Gemma Cooper	Great Britain	0	8:52.47
18	Sandrine Tas	Belgium	0	DNF
