= 2021 World Single Distances Speed Skating Championships – Women's 5000 metres =

Women's 5000 metres at the 2021 World Single Distances Speed Skating Championships
- Venue: Thialf
- Location: Heerenveen, Netherlands
- Date: 14 February
- Competitors: 12 from 9 nations
- Winning time: 6:48.537

Medalists
gold medal	Irene Schouten	Netherlands
silver medal	Natalya Voronina
bronze medal	Carlijn Achtereekte	Netherlands

The Women's 5000 metres competition at the 2021 World Single Distances Speed Skating Championships was held on 14 February 2021.

== Results ==
The race was started at 14:30.

Rank	Pair	Lane	Name	Country	Time	Diff
1st place, gold medalist(s)	1	o	Irene Schouten	Netherlands	6:48.537	
2nd place, silver medalist(s)	5	i	Natalya Voronina	Russian Skating Union	6:50.997	+2.46
3rd place, bronze medalist(s)	3	i	Carlijn Achtereekte	Netherlands	6:52.220	+3.69
4	6	o	Isabelle Weidemann	Canada	6:56.181	+7.65
5	4	o	Martina Sáblíková	Czech Republic	6:57.671	+9.14
6	2	o	Ragne Wiklund	Norway	6:58.766	+10.23
7	1	i	Valérie Maltais	Canada	7:05.830	+17.30
8	4	i	Maryna Zuyeva	Belarus	7:05.954	+17.42
9	2	i	Francesca Lollobrigida	Italy	7:07.488; NR	+18.95
10	6	i	Claudia Pechstein	Germany	7:09.172	+20.64
11	5	o	Nadezhda Morozova	Kazakhstan	7:23.599	+35.06
12	3	o	Anastasiia Grigoreva	Russian Skating Union	7:23.875	+35.34
