= 2025 World Single Distances Speed Skating Championships – Women's 3000 metres =

Women's 3000 metres at the 2025 World Single Distances Speed Skating Championships
- Venue: Vikingskipet
- Location: Hamar, Norway
- Dates: 13 March
- Competitors: 20 from 11 nations
- Winning time: 4:00.39

Medalists
gold medal	Joy Beune	Netherlands
silver medal	Martina Sáblíková	Czech Republic
bronze medal	Merel Conijn	Netherlands

The Women's 3000 metres competition at the 2025 World Single Distances Speed Skating Championships took place on 13 March 2025.

== Qualification ==
A total of 20 entry quotas were available for the event, with a maximum of three per country. The entry quotas were assigned to countries following a Special Qualification Ranking List based on rankings and performances of skaters during the 2024–25 ISU Speed Skating World Cup.

== Records ==
Prior to this competition, the existing world and track records were as follows.

	Time	Athlete	Date
World Record	3:52.02	Martina Sáblíková (CZE)	9 March 2019
Track Record	3:58.00	Irene Schouten (NED)	5 March 2022

== Results ==
The race was started at 18:00.

Rank	Pair	Lane	Name	Country	Time	Diff
1st place, gold medalist(s)	9	i	Joy Beune	Netherlands	4:00.39	
2nd place, silver medalist(s)	8	i	Martina Sáblíková	Czech Republic	4:00.57	+0.18
3rd place, bronze medalist(s)	8	o	Merel Conijn	Netherlands	4:01.22	+0.83
4	9	o	Ragne Wiklund	Norway	4:01.23	+0.84
5	10	o	Francesca Lollobrigida	Italy	4:02.56	+2.17
6	6	o	Valérie Maltais	Canada	4:03.06	+2.67
7	10	i	Isabelle Weidemann	Canada	4:04.29	+3.90
8	5	i	Ivanie Blondin	Canada	4:04.79	+4.40
9	6	i	Marijke Groenewoud	Netherlands	4:04.93	+4.54
10	4	i	Nikola Zdráhalová	Czech Republic	4:05.09	+4.70
11	7	o	Yang Binyu	China	4:06.25	+5.86
12	7	i	Momoka Horikawa	Japan	4:07.83	+7.44
13	5	o	Josie Hofmann	Germany	4:08.44	+8.05
14	1	i	Han Mei	China	4:08.66	+8.27
15	4	o	Ahenaer Adake	China	4:09.81	+9.42
16	3	i	Sandrine Tas	Belgium	4:10.39	+10.00
17	3	o	Maira Jasch	Germany	4:12.76	+12.37
18	2	i	Mia Manganello	United States	4:15.20	+14.81
19	2	o	Alice Marletti	Italy	4:17.04	+16.65
20	1	o	Kaitlyn McGregor	Switzerland	4:17.62	+17.23
