= 2011 KNSB Dutch Single Distance Championships – Women's 5000 m =

- Venue: Thialf, Heerenveen, Netherlands
- Date: 7 November 2010
- Competitors: 10 skaters

Medalist men
1st place, gold medalist(s)		Moniek Kleinsman	NED
2nd place, silver medalist(s)		Carlijn Achtereekte	NED
3rd place, bronze medalist(s)		Marije Joling	NED

The women's 5000 meter at the 2011 KNSB Dutch Single Distance Championships took place in Heerenveen at the Thialf ice skating rink on Sunday 7 November 2010. Although this tournament was held in 2010, it was part of the 2010–2011 speed skating season.

There were 10 participants. There was a qualification selection incentive for the next following 2010–11 ISU Speed Skating World Cup tournaments.

Title holder was Renate Groenewold.

== Overview ==
=== Result ===
Rank	Skater	Time
1st place, gold medalist(s)	Moniek Kleinsman	7:15.61
2nd place, silver medalist(s)	Carlijn Achtereekte	7:18.14 PR
3rd place, bronze medalist(s)	Marije Joling	7:19.49 PR
4	Annouk van der Weijden	7:22.50
5	Maria Sterk	7:22.93
6	Irene Schouten	7:23.67 PR
7	Lisette van der Geest	7:29.53
8	Janneke Ensing	7:30.85
–	Jorien Voorhuis	DQ
–	Linda de Vries	DQ

=== Draw ===
Heat	Inner lane	Outer lane
1	Lisette van der Geest	Irene Schouten
2	Marije Joling	Annouk van der Weijden
3	Maria Sterk	Janneke Ensing
4	Moniek Kleinsman	Linda de Vries
5	Jorien Voorhuis	Carlijn Achtereekte
