= 2015 World Single Distance Speed Skating Championships – Women's mass start =

Women's mass start at the 2015 World Single Distance Speed Skating Championships
- Venue: Thialf, Heerenveen
- Date: 15 February 2015
- Competitors: 22 from 13 nations

Medalists
gold medal	Irene Schouten	Netherlands
silver medal	Ivanie Blondin	Canada
bronze medal	Mariska Huisman	Netherlands

The women's mass start race of the 2015 World Single Distance Speed Skating Championships was held on 15 February 2015.

== Results ==
The race was started at 16:19.

Rank	Name	Country	Time	Points
1st place, gold medalist(s)	Irene Schouten	NED	8:38.23	60
2nd place, silver medalist(s)	Ivanie Blondin	CAN	8:38.38	40
3rd place, bronze medalist(s)	Mariska Huisman	NED	8:38.70	20
4	Miho Takagi	JPN	9:12.23	8
5	Vanessa Bittner	AUT	9:06.64	6
6	Bente Kraus	GER	8:50.61	5
7	Liu Yichi	CHN	8:43.03	3
8	Liu Jing	CHN	8:43.03	3
9	Marina Zueva	BLR	8:45.25	1
10	Saskia Alusalu	EST	8:47.05	1
11	Nikola Zdráhalová	CZE	8:57.71	1
12	Kim Bo-reum	KOR	8:38.95	0
13	Nana Takagi	JPN	8:39.01	0
14	Francesca Lollobrigida	ITA	8:39.39	0
15	Natalya Voronina	RUS	8:40.17	0
16	Martina Sáblíková	CZE	8:40.87	0
17	Jelena Peeters	BEL	8:42.58	0
18	Claudia Pechstein	GER	8:43.02	0
19	Kali Christ	CAN	8:43.19	0
20	Maria Lamb	USA	8:43.23	0
21	Jun Ye-jin	KOR	8:46.14	0
	Tatyana Mikhailova	BLR	DSQ	
