= 2022 KNSB Dutch Single Distance Championships – Women's 1500 m =

Dutch speed skating competition

- Venue: Thialf, Heerenveen
- Dates: 29 October 2021
- Competitors: 24 skaters

Medalist women
1st place, gold medalist(s)		Antoinette de Jong	NED
2nd place, silver medalist(s)		Ireen Wüst	NED
3rd place, bronze medalist(s)		Jutta Leerdam	NED

The women's 1500 meter at the 2022 KNSB Dutch Single Distance Championships in Heerenveen took place at Thialf ice skating rink on Friday 28 October 2021. Although the tournament was held in 2021 it was the 2022 edition as it was part of the 2021–2022 speed skating season. There were 24 participants. The first 5 skaters were eligible for the following World Cup tournaments.

== Statistics ==
=== Result ===
Rank	Skater	Time
1st place, gold medalist(s)	Antoinette de Jong	1:53.20 PR
2nd place, silver medalist(s)	Ireen Wüst	1:53.48
3rd place, bronze medalist(s)	Jutta Leerdam	1:53.64 PR
4	Irene Schouten	1:54.14 PR
5	Jorien ter Mors	1:54.65
6	Marijke Groenewoud	1:54.67 PR
7	Elisa Dul	1:55.07 PR
8	Lotte van Beek	1:55.16
9	Joy Beune	1:56.152
10	Gioya Lancee	1:56.159 PR
11	Sanneke de Neeling	1:56.17
12	Melissa Wijfje	1:56.35
13	Reina Anema	1:56.52
14	Carlijn Achtereekte	1:56.70
15	Myrthe de Boer	1:56.76 PR
16	Robin Groot	1:57.14 PR
17	Merel Conijn	1:57.22 PR
18	Kim Talsma	157.33 PR
19	Evelien Vijn	1:57.52 PR
20	Esther Kiel	1:58.35 PR
21	Isabelle van Elst	1:58.384
22	Leonie Bats	1:59.09 PR
23	Isabel Grevelt	1:59.59 PR
24	Jade Groenewoud	2:03.19

Referee: Berri de Jonge. Assistant: Suzan van den Belt. Starter: Marco Hesselink.
Start: 17:14.00 hr. Finish 17:53.44 hr.

=== Draw ===
Heat	Inner lane	Outer lane
1	Isabel Grevelt	Jade Groenewoud
2	Leonie Bats	Kim Talsma
3	Evelien Vijn	Myrthe de Boer
4	Elisa Dul	Robin Groot
5	Carlijn Achtereekte	Gioya Lancee
6	Esther Kiel	Merel Conijn
7	Lotte van Beek	Marijke Groenewoud
8	Sanneke de Neeling	Jutta Leerdam
9	Reina Anema	Isabelle van Elst
10	Irene Schouten	Jorien ter Mors
11	Ireen Wüst	Antoinette de Jong
12	Joy Beune	Melissa Wijfje
