= 2023 KNSB Dutch Single Distance Championships – Women's 1500 m =

Dutch speed skating competition

- Venue: Thialf, Heerenveen
- Dates: 3 February 2023
- Competitors: 20 skaters

Medalist women
1st place, gold medalist(s)		Antoinette Rijpma-de Jong	NED
2nd place, silver medalist(s)		Marijke Groenewoud	NED
3rd place, bronze medalist(s)		Jutta Leerdam	NED

The women's 1500 meter at the 2023 KNSB Dutch Single Distance Championships in Heerenveen, Netherlands took place at Thialf ice skating rink on Friday 3 February 2023. There were 20 participants. Antoinette Rijpma-de Jong, Marijke Groenewoud, and Jutta Leerdam qualified for the 2023 ISU World Speed Skating Championships in Heerenveen.

== Statistics ==
=== Result ===
Rank	Skater	Time
1st place, gold medalist(s)	Antoinette Rijpma-de Jong	1:55.21
2nd place, silver medalist(s)	Marijke Groenewoud	1:55.38
3rd place, bronze medalist(s)	Jutta Leerdam	1:55.39
4	Joy Beune	1:55.78
5	Elisa Dul	1:57.48
6	Myrthe de Boer	1:57.79
7	Sanneke de Neeling	1:58.14
8	Robin Groot	1:58.24
9	Reina Anema	1:58.89
10	Paulien Verhaar	2:00.10
11	Aveline Hijlkema	2:01.56
12	Kim Talsma	2:02.30
13	Evelien Vijn	2:02.75
14	Sanne Westra	2:02.85
15	Naomi van der Werf	2:03.08
16	Eline Noorden	2:03.20
17	Lotte Groenen	2:03.42 PR
18	Ju-Lin de Visser	2:04.52
19	Romée Ebbinge	2:04.63
20	Bente Kerkoff	2:05.21

Referee: Loretta Staring. Assistant: Miriam Kuipers. Starter: Jans Rosing.

=== Draw ===
Heat	Outer lane	Inner lane
1	Ju-Lin de Visser	Lotte Groenen
2	Kim Talsma	Evelien Vijn
3	Bente Kerkoff	Naomi van der Werf
4	Eline Noorden	Romée Ebbinge
5	Myrthe de Boer	Sanneke de Neeling
6	Paulien Verhaar	Aveline Hijlkema
7	Elisa Dul	Sanne Westra
8	Jutta Leerdam	Robin Groot
9	Reina Anema	Marijke Groenewoud
10	Joy Beune	Antoinette Rijpma-de Jong
