= 2013 KNSB Dutch Single Distance Championships – Women's 3000 m =

- Venue: Thialf, Heerenveen, Netherlands
- Date: 10 November 2012
- Competitors: 20 skaters

Medalist men
1st place, gold medalist(s)		Diane Valkenburg	NED
2nd place, silver medalist(s)		Ireen Wüst	NED
3rd place, bronze medalist(s)		Jorien ter Mors	NED

The women's 3000 meter at the 2013 KNSB Dutch Single Distance Championships took place in Heerenveen at the Thialf ice skating rink on Saturday 10 November 2012. Although this tournament was held in 2012, it was part of the 2012–2013 speed skating season.

There were 20 participants.

Title holder was Pien Keulstra.

The first 5 skaters qualified for the next following 2012–13 ISU Speed Skating World Cup tournaments.

== Overview ==
=== Result ===
Rank	Skater	Time
1st place, gold medalist(s)	Diane Valkenburg	4:05.80
2nd place, silver medalist(s)	Ireen Wüst	4:06.90
3rd place, bronze medalist(s)	Jorien ter Mors	4:06.99 PR
4	Marije Joling	4:08.48 PR
5	Antoinette de Jong	4:09.07 PR
6	Annouk van der Weijden	4:09.71
7	Linda de Vries	4:10.50
8	Rixt Meijer	4:11.87 PR
9	Mariska Huisman	4:12.64 PR
10	Carlijn Achtereekte	4:13.23
11	Wieteke Cramer	4:13.53
12	Jorien Voorhuis	4:13.56
13	Reina Anema	4:13.93 PR
14	Yvonne Nauta	4:14.51
15	Irene Schouten	4:15.51 PR
16	Janneke Ensing	4:16.40
17	Elma de Vries	4:16.52
18	Jade van der Molen	4:17.00 PR
19	Carla Zielman	4:17.42 PR
20	Imke Vormeer	4:21.67 PR

=== Draw ===
Heat	Inner lane	Outer lane
1	Jade van der Molen	Elma de Vries
2	Reina Anema	Wieteke Cramer
3	Imke Vormeer	Carla Zielman
4	Irene Schouten	Mariska Huisman
5	Rixt Meijer	Antoinette de Jong
6	Janneke Ensing	Carlijn Achtereekte
7	Jorien ter Mors	Jorien Voorhuis
8	Yvonne Nauta	Annouk van der Weijden
9	Diane Valkenburg	Ireen Wüst
10	Marije Joling	Linda de Vries
