= 2013 KNSB Dutch Single Distance Championships – Men's 1000 m =

Dutch speed skating competition

- Venue: Thialf, Heerenveen
- Dates: 11 November 2012
- Competitors: 24

Medalist men
1st place, gold medalist(s)		Kjeld Nuis	NED
2nd place, silver medalist(s)		Hein Otterspeer	NED
3rd place, bronze medalist(s)		Sjoerd de Vries	NED

The men's 1000 meter at the 2013 KNSB Dutch Single Distance Championships took place in Heerenveen at the Thialf ice skating rink on Sunday 11 November 2012. Although this tournament was held in 2012 it was part of the speed skating season 2012–2013. There were 24 participants.

== Statistics ==
=== Result ===
Position	Skater	Time
1st place, gold medalist(s)	Kjeld Nuis	1:09.05
2nd place, silver medalist(s)	Hein Otterspeer	1:09.11
3rd place, bronze medalist(s)	Sjoerd de Vries	1:09.31
4	Pim Schipper	1:09.51
5	Rhian Ket	1:09.72(8)
5	Michel Mulder	1:09.72(8)
7	Stefan Groothuis	1:10.01
8	Koen Verweij	1:10.02
9	Lucas van Alphen	1:10.18
10	Maurice Vriend	1:10.39 PR
11	Ronald Mulder	1:10.44
12	Thomas Krol	1:10.54
13	Jesper Hospes	1:10.98
14	Lennart Velema	1:11.36
15	Thom van Beek	1:11.37 PR
16	Bas Bervoets	1:11.38
17	Lieuwe Mulder	1:11.42
18	Kai Verbij	1:11.47
19	Frank Hermans	1:11.67
20	Karsten van Zeijl	1:11.76 PR
21	Pepijn van der Vinne	1:12.05 PR
22	Remco Olde Heuvel	1:12.53
23	Jesper van Veen	1:12.80
NC	Guus Baan	DQ

=== Draw ===
Heat	Inside lane	Outside lane
1	Jesper van Veen	Lennart Velema
2	Pepijn van der Vinne	Thom van Beek
3	Karsten van Zeijl	Bas Bervoets
4	Guus Baan	Lieuwe Mulder
5	Rhian Ket	Koen Verweij
6	Jesper Hospes	Kai Verbij
7	Maurice Vriend	Lucas van Alphen
8	Thomas Krol	Frank Hermans
9	Pim Schipper	Ronald Mulder
10	Hein Otterspeer	Remco Olde Heuvel
11	Stefan Groothuis	Sjoerd de Vries
12	Kjeld Nuis	Michel Mulder
