= 2020–21 ISU Speed Skating World Cup =

International speed skating competition

ISU Speed Skating World Cup
- Dates: 22–31 January 2021

The 2020–21 ISU Speed Skating World Cup, officially the ISU World Cup Speed Skating 2020–2021, was a series of two international speed skating competitions that ran in January 2021.

== Calendar ==
The detailed schedule for the season.

WC #	Location	Venue	Date	500 m	1000 m	1500 m	3000 m	5000 m	Mass start	Team pursuit
1	Heerenveen, Netherlands	Thialf	22–24 Jan	2m, 2w	m, w	m, w	w	m	m, w	m, w
2	Heerenveen, Netherlands	Thialf	29–31 Jan	2m, 2w	m, w	m, w	w	m	m, w	m, w
Total				4m, 4w	2m, 2w	2m, 2w	2w	2m	2m, 2w	2m, 2w

== Men's standings ==
=== 500 m ===
Final classification

Rank	Name	Points
1	(Netherlands) Dai Dai Ntab	200
2	(Canada) Laurent Dubreuil	182
3	(Netherlands) Ronald Mulder	180
4	(Russia) Artem Arefyev	170
5	(Russia) Viktor Mushtakov	145

=== 1000 m ===
Final classification

Rank	Name	Points
1	(Netherlands) Kai Verbij	114
2	(Netherlands) Thomas Krol	114
3	(Netherlands) Hein Otterspeer	83
4	(Canada) Laurent Dubreuil	80
5	(Netherlands) Dai Dai Ntab	76

=== 1500 m ===
Final classification

Rank	Name	Points
1	(Netherlands) Thomas Krol	120
2	(Netherlands) Kjeld Nuis	102
3	(Netherlands) Patrick Roest	102
4	(Norway) Hallgeir Engebråten	81
5	(Netherlands) Wesly Dijs	74

=== Long distances ===
Final classification

Rank	Name	Points
1	(Netherlands) Patrick Roest	120
2	(Netherlands) Sven Kramer	97
3	(Russia) Sergey Trofimov	96
4	(Italy) Davide Ghiotto	83
5	(Sweden) Nils van der Poel	79

=== Mass start ===
Final classification

Rank	Name	Points
1	(Belgium) Bart Swings	356
2	(Netherlands) Jorrit Bergsma	330
3	(Switzerland) Livio Wenger	328
4	(Italy) Andrea Giovannini	255
5	(Latvia) Haralds Silovs	236

=== Team pursuit ===
Final classification

Rank	Name	Points
1	Norway	228
2	Netherlands	206
3	Canada	204
4	Russia	176
5	Italy	162

== Women's standings ==
=== 500 m ===
Final classification

Rank	Name	Points
1	(Netherlands) Femke Kok	240
2	(Russia) Angelina Golikova	216
3	(Russia) Olga Fatkulina	177
4	(Netherlands) Michelle de Jong	146
5	(Austria) Vanessa Herzog	143

=== 1000 m ===
Final classification

Rank	Name	Points
1	(United States) Brittany Bowe	120
2	(Netherlands) Jorien ter Mors	97
3	(Netherlands) Femke Kok	96
4	(Russia) Angelina Golikova	88
5	(Netherlands) Ireen Wüst	78

=== 1500 m ===
Final classification

Rank	Name	Points
1	(United States) Brittany Bowe	120
2	(Netherlands) Antoinette de Jong	102
3	(Netherlands) Ireen Wüst	102
4	(Russia) Evgeniia Lalenkova	86
5	(Poland) Natalia Czerwonka	72

=== Long distances ===
Final classification

Rank	Name	Points
1	(Netherlands) Irene Schouten	108
2	(Netherlands) Antoinette de Jong	108
3	(Russia) Natalya Voronina	94
4	(Netherlands) Joy Beune	88
5	(Czech Republic) Martina Sábliková	86

=== Mass start ===
Final classification

Rank	Name	Points
1	(Netherlands) Irene Schouten	300
2	(Canada) Ivanie Blondin	270
3	(Russia) Elizaveta Golubeva	236
4	(Italy) Linda Rossi	206
5	(Germany) Claudia Pechstein	184

=== Team pursuit ===
Final classification

Rank	Name	Points
1	Canada	240
2	Netherlands	216
3	Norway	192
4	Russia	172
5	Poland	160
