= 2013 KNSB Dutch Single Distance Championships =

KNSB Dutch Single Distance Championships
- Venue: Thialf, Heerenveen
- Dates: 9–11 November 2012

The 2013 KNSB Dutch Single Distance Championships were held at the Thialf ice stadium in Heerenveen from 9 November until 11 November 2012. Although the tournament was held in 2012 it was the 2013 edition as it is part of the 2012/2013 speed skating season.

== Schedule ==
Schedule
Date	Time	Distance
Friday 9 November 2012	15:15; 17:35; 18:19; 19:16	Men's 5000 meter Men's 500 meter 1st run Women's 1500 meter Men's 500 meter 2nd run
Saturday; 10 November 2012	13:15; 14:55; 15:37; 16:36	Women's 3000 meter Women's 500 meter 1st run Men's 1500 meter Women's 500 meter 2nd run
Sunday; 11 November 2012	12:00; 13:34; 14:24; 15:14	Women's 5000 meter Men's 1000 meter Women's 1000 meter Men's 10,000 meter

== Medalists ==
=== Men ===
Distance	Gold		Silver		Bronze	
2x500 m details	Michel Mulder	69.940 (34.96 / 34.98)	Jan Smeekens	70.300 (35.23 / 35.07)	Hein Otterspeer	70.320 (35.18 / 35.14)
1000 m details	Kjeld Nuis	1:09.05	Hein Otterspeer	1:09.11	Sjoerd de Vries	1:09.31
1500 m details	Kjeld Nuis	1:46.74	Renz Rotteveel	1:47.22	Maurice Vriend	1:47.66
5000 m details	Sven Kramer	6:17.46	Jan Blokhuijsen	6:20.34	Jorrit Bergsma	6:20.46
10,000 m details	Jorrit Bergsma	12:57.42	Bob de Jong	12:59.07	Jan Blokhuijsen	13:06.99

Men's results: Schaatsen.nl & SchaatsStatistieken.nl

=== Women ===
Distance	Gold		Silver		Bronze	
2x500 m details	Thijsje Oenema	76.870 (38.51/38.36)	Margot Boer	77.280 (38.66/38.62)	Laurine van Riessen	77.330 (38.81/38.52)
1000 m details	Marrit Leenstra	1:16.39	Lotte van Beek	1:16.97	Diane Valkenburg	1:17.07
1500 m details	Ireen Wüst	1:57.11	Lotte van Beek	1:57.46	Marrit Leenstra	1:58.33
3000 m details	Diane Valkenburg	4:05.80	Ireen Wüst	4:06.90	Jorien ter Mors	4:06.99
5000 m details	Marije Joling	7:06.03	Diane Valkenburg	7:08.48	Rixt Meijer	7:09.92

Women's results: Schaatsen.nl & SchaatsStatistieken.nl
