= 2022 KNSB Dutch Single Distance Championships – Women's 5000 m =

Dutch speed skating competition

- Venue: Thialf, Heerenveen
- Dates: 31 October 2021
- Competitors: 12 skaters

Medalist women
1st place, gold medalist(s)		Irene Schouten	NED
2nd place, silver medalist(s)		Sanne in 't Hof	NED
3rd place, bronze medalist(s)		Carlijn Achtereekte	NED

The women's 5000 meter at the 2022 KNSB Dutch Single Distance Championships in Heerenveen took place at Thialf ice skating rink on Sunday 31 October 2021. Although the tournament was held in 2021 it was the 2022 edition as it was part of the 2021–2022 speed skating season. There were 12 participants. The first 5 skaters were eligible for the following World Cup tournaments

== Statistics ==
=== Result ===
Rank	Skater	Time
1st place, gold medalist(s)	Irene Schouten	6:45.69 PR TR
2nd place, silver medalist(s)	Sanne in 't Hof	6:57.63 PR
3rd place, bronze medalist(s)	Carlijn Achtereekte	7:00.50
4	Joy Beune	7:01.91
5	Melissa Wijfje	7:02.68
6	Merel Conijn	7:04.43 PR
7	Esmee Visser	7:05.19
8	Evelien Vijn	7:05.29 PR
9	Reina Anema	7:05.63
10	Esther Kiel	7:11.68 PR
11	Aveline Hijlkema	7:14.71
12	Jade Groenewoud	7:20.17

Referee: Berri de Jonge. Assistant: Suzan van den Belt, Starter: Janny Smegen
Start: 14:20.00 hr. Finish: 15:11.16 hr.

=== Draw ===
Heat	Inner lane	Outer lane
1	Aveline Hijlkema	Merel Conijn
2	Esther Kiel	Jade Groenewoud
3	Evelien Vijn	Reina Anema
4	Sanne in 't Hof	Joy Beune
5	Melissa Wijfje	Irene Schouten
6	Carlijn Achtereekte	Esmee Visser
