= 2024 World Single Distances Speed Skating Championships – Women's 1500 metres =

Women's 1500 metres at the 2024 World Single Distances Speed Skating Championships
- Venue: Olympic Oval
- Location: Calgary, Canada
- Dates: February 18
- Competitors: 24 from 13 nations
- Winning time: 1:52.29

Medalists
gold medal	Miho Takagi	Japan
silver medal	Han Mei	China
bronze medal	Joy Beune	Netherlands

The Women's 1500 metres competition at the 2024 World Single Distances Speed Skating Championships was held on February 18, 2024.

== Results ==
The race was started at 15:08.

Rank	Pair	Lane	Name	Country	Time	Diff
1st place, gold medalist(s)	11	i	Miho Takagi	Japan	1:52.29	
2nd place, silver medalist(s)	11	o	Han Mei	China	1:52.72	+0.43
3rd place, bronze medalist(s)	12	i	Joy Beune	Netherlands	1:52.91	+0.62
4	8	o	Antoinette Rijpma-de Jong	Netherlands	1:53.27	+0.98
5	7	o	Ayano Sato	Japan	1:53.29	+1.00
6	10	o	Ivanie Blondin	Canada	1:53.41	+1.12
7	9	o	Kimi Goetz	United States	1:53.98	+1.69
8	12	o	Marijke Groenewoud	Netherlands	1:54.59	+2.30
9	7	i	Kaitlyn McGregor	Switzerland	1:54.91	+2.62
10	8	i	Valérie Maltais	Canada	1:54.99	+2.70
11	10	i	Brittany Bowe	United States	1:55.73	+3.44
12	4	i	Mia Manganello	United States	1:55.78	+3.49
13	5	i	Ellia Smeding	Great Britain	1:55.83	+3.54
14	9	i	Ragne Wiklund	Norway	1:56.16	+3.87
15	4	o	Abigail McCluskey	Canada	1:56.28	+3.99
16	5	o	Sumire Kikuchi	Japan	1:56.48	+4.19
17	6	o	Isabelle van Elst	Belgium	1:56.96	+4.67
18	2	i	Tian Ruining	China	1:57.32	+5.03
19	2	o	Natalia Jabrzyk	Poland	1:57.42	+5.13
20	3	i	Kang Soo-min	South Korea	1:57.43	+5.14
21	1	o	Yekaterina Aidova	Kazakhstan	1:57.62	+5.33
22	3	o	Sandrine Tas	Belgium	1:57.82	+5.53
23	1	i	Laura Peveri	Italy	1:58.49	+6.20
24	6	i	Yang Binyu	China	1:59.28	+6.99
