= Robin Groot =

Dutch speed skater

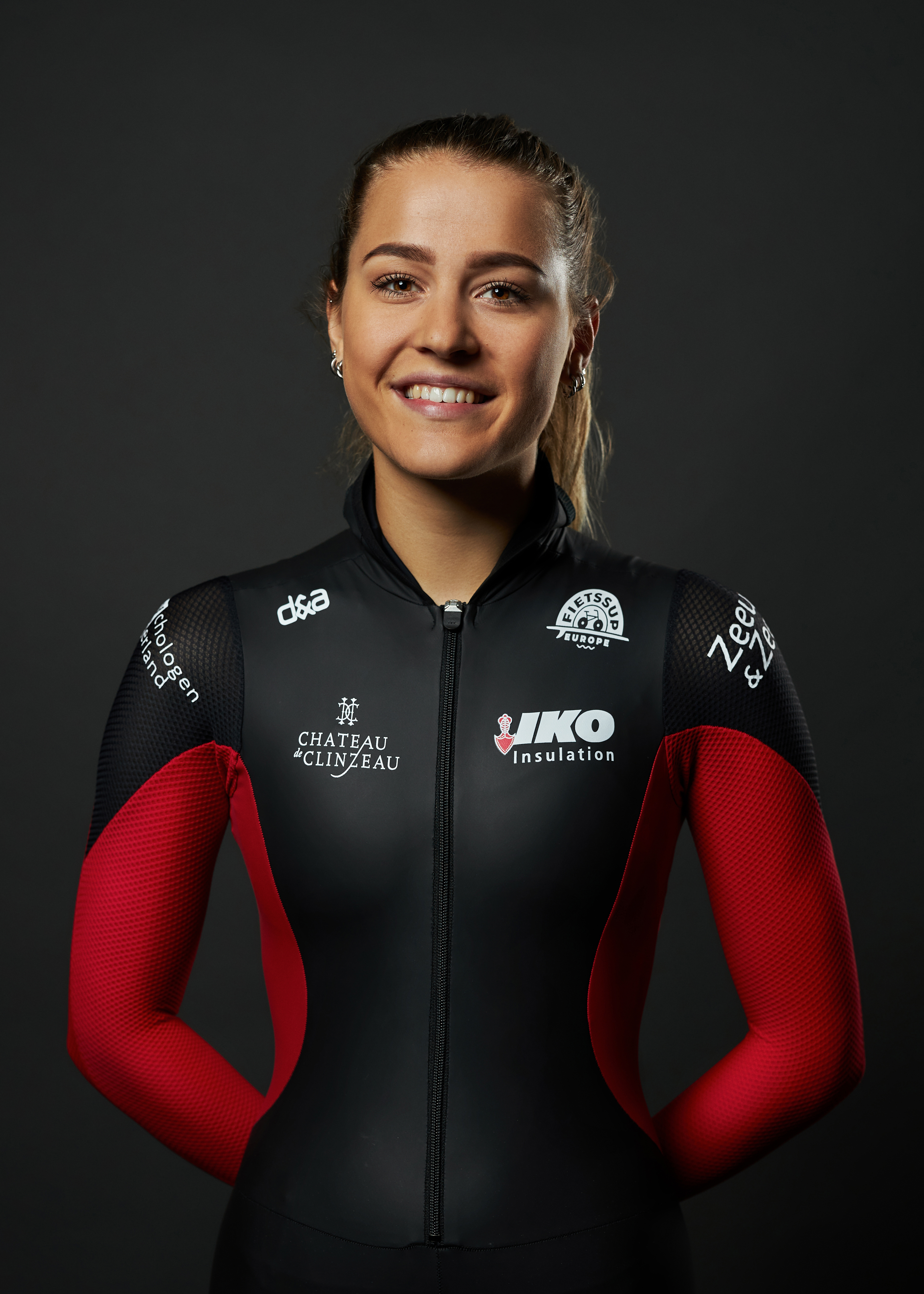
- Groot (2022)

Personal information
- Nationality: Dutch
- Born: 12 January 2001 (age 25) Alkmaar, Netherlands

Sport
- Country: Netherlands
- Sport: Speed skating
- Events: 1500 m, 3000m, 5000 m
- Club: Team Jumbo Visma

Robin Groot (born 12 January 2001), is a Dutch speed skater specializing in the sprint events.

In 2019, Groot won 3 medals at the Junior World Championships and 7 medals the following season

Groot holds the track record small combination at Kardinge, Groningen.

== Personal records ==
Personal records
Speed skating
Event	Result	Date	Location	Notes
500 m	39.30	27 December 2022	Thialf, Heerenveen	
1000 m	1:16.53	22 December 2023	Thialf, Heerenveen	
1500 m	1:56.59	28 December 2023	Thialf, Heerenveen	
3000 m	4:02.72	29 December 2023	Thialf, Heerenveen	
5000 m	7:00.56	30 December 2023	Thialf, Heerenveen	

== Tournament overview ==
Season	Dutch Championships Single Distances	Dutch Championships Allround	European Championships Allround	World Cup GWC	World Championships Junior
2018–19	HEERENVEEN 18th 1000m 17th 1500m 16th 3000m				BASELGA DI PINÉ 7th 500m 5th 1000m 4th 1500m (silver) 3000m 4th overall (bronze) mass start (silver) team pursuit
2019–20	HEERENVEEN 16th 3000m				TOMASZÓW MAZOWIECKI (bronze) 500m (silver) 1000m (gold) 1500m (gold) ) 3000m (gold) overall (gold) mass start (gold) team pursuit
2020–21	HEERENVEEN DQ 1000m	HEERENVEEN 12th 500m 18th 3000m 12th 1500m DNQ 5000m NC14 overall			
2021–22	HEERENVEEN 16th 1500m 11th 3000m 4th mass start	HEERENVEEN 6th 500m 7th 3000m 4th 1500m 7th 5000m 5th overall			
2022–23	HEERENVEEN 8th 1500m 7th 3000m 4th 5000m 5th mass start	HEERENVEEN 4th 500m 4th 3000m 6th 1500m 7th 5000m 4th overall	HAMAR (bronze) 500m 4th 3000m 4th 1500m 4th 5000m 4th overall	34th 3000m	
