= Carlijn Achtereekte =

Dutch speed skater (born 1990)

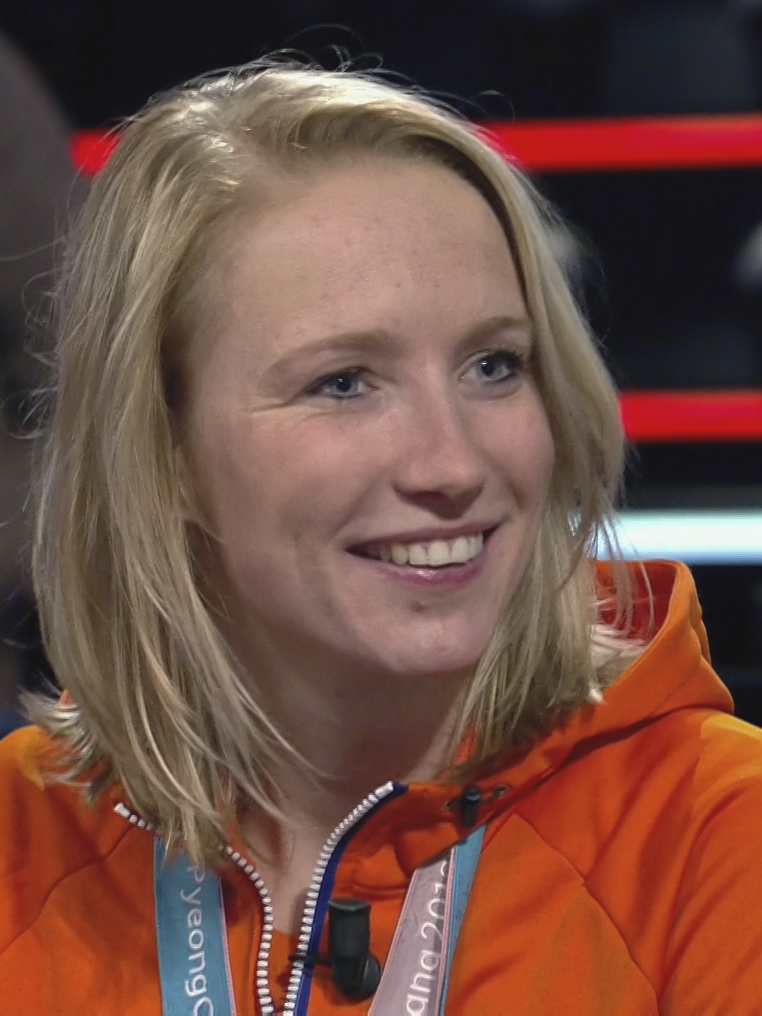
- Achtereekte in 2018

Personal information
- Nationality: Dutch
- Born: 29 January 1990 (age 36) Lettele, Netherlands
- Height: 1.74 m (5 ft 9 in)
- Weight: 60 kg (132 lb)

Sport
- Country: Netherlands
- Sport: Speed skating
- Events: 3000 m, 5000 m
- Turned pro: 2008
- Retired: 2022
Medal record
Women's speed skating
Representing the Netherlands
Olympic Games
Gold medal – first place	2018 Pyeongchang	3000 m
World Single Distance Championships
Silver medal – second place	2015 Heerenveen	5000 m
Silver medal – second place	2020 Salt Lake City	3000 m
Bronze medal – third place	2021 Heerenveen	5000 m
European Single Distance Championships
Silver medal – second place	2018 Kolomna	3000 m

Carlijn Achtereekte (Dutch pronunciation: [kɑrˈlɛin ˈɑxtərˌeːktə]; born 29 January 1990) is a Dutch former speed skater and current road cyclist, who currently rides for UCI Women's WorldTeam Visma–Lease a Bike. Achtereekte won three silver medals in the 5000 metres at the Dutch Single Distance Championships. At the 2015 World Single Distance Speed Skating Championships in Heerenveen, she won the silver medal at the 5000 metres event behind Martina Sáblíková. Currently Achtereekte is a professional cyclist, competing for Team Jumbo–Visma.

At the 2018 Winter Olympics, her first Olympic Games, Achtereekte took a surprise gold medal in the 3000 metres, leading home team-mates Ireen Wüst and Antoinette de Jong in a Dutch clean sweep of the podium, despite never having won a World Cup race. On 23 March 2018 she was awarded Knight of the Order of Orange-Nassau by King Willem-Alexander.

== Personal records ==
Personal records
Speed skating
Event	Result	Date	Location	Notes
500 m	39.25	3 March 2019	Calgary	
1000 m	1:18.46	7 February 2015	Inzell	
1500 m	1:53.93	3 March 2019	Calgary	
3000 m	3:54.92	13 February 2020	Salt Lake City	
5000 m	6:49.81	27 January 2019	Heerenveen	

Per January 2022 she is ranked 11th on the adelskalender with a points total of 157.360

== Tournament overview ==
Season	Dutch Championships Single Distances	Dutch Championships Allround	European Championships Single Distances	European Championships Allround	World Championships Single Distances	World Championships Allround	Olympic Games	World Cup GWC
2009–10	HEERENVEEN 17th 3000m	HEERENVEEN 20th 500m 15th 3000m 20th 1500m DNQ 5000m NC19 overall						
2010–11	HEERENVEEN 20th 1500m 8th 3000m (silver) 5000m	HEERENVEEN 13th 500m 9th 3000m 11th 1500m 4th 5000m 6th overall						35th 3000/5000m
2011–12	HEERENVEEN 6th 3000m (silver) 5000m	HEERENVEEN 6th 500m 9th 3000m 10th 1500m 8th 5000m 8th overall						21st 3000/5000m
2012–13	HEERENVEEN 10th 3000m 5th 5000m	HEERENVEEN 9th 500m 11th 3000m 14th 1500m DNQ 5000m NC10 overall						29th 3000/5000m
2013–14	HEERENVEEN 17th 1500m 9th 3000m 5th 5000m	AMSTERDAM 4th 500m 9th 3000m 9th 1500m 7th 5000m 7th overall						42nd 1500m 28th 3000/5000m
2014–15	HEERENVEEN DQ 1500m (bronze) 3000m (silver) 5000m	HEERENVEEN 5th 500m 5th 3000m 10th 1500m (gold) 5000m 4th overall			HEERENVEEN (silver) 5000m			26th 1500m 7th 3000/5000m
2015–16	HEERENVEEN 15th 1500m 9th 3000m 5th 5000m	HEERENVEEN 4th 500m 4th 3000m 8th 1500m 8th 5000m 7th overall						
2016–17	HEERENVEEN 9th 1500m 4th 3000m (bronze) 5000m 18th mass start	HEERENVEEN 7th 500m 4th 3000m 7th 1500m (gold) 5000m (bronze) overall						17th 3000/5000m 29th mass start
2017–18	HEERENVEEN 9th 1500m 4th 3000m (bronze) 5000m		KOLOMNA (silver) 3000m				GANGNEUNG (gold) 3000m	21st 3000/5000m
2018–19	HEERENVEEN 6th 1500m (bronze) 3000m (bronze) 5000m	HEERENVEEN (silver) 500m (silver) 3000m (silver) 1500m (silver) 5000m (gold) overall		COLLALBO 10th 500m 5th 3000m 10th 1500m (bronze) 5000m 6th overall	INZELL 4th 3000m	HAMAR 12th 500m 4th 3000m 5th 1500m (bronze) 5000m 4th overall		
2019–20	HEERENVEEN 5th 1500m (bronze) 3000m (bronze) 5000m 14th mass start	HEERENVEEN 4th 500m (silver) 3000m 5th 1500m (gold) 5000m (bronze) overall			SALT LAKE CITY (silver) 3000m			
2020–21	HEERENVEEN 4th 3000m (bronze) 5000m				HEERENVEEN (bronze) 5000m			(silver) team pursuit
2021–22	HEERENVEEN 14th 1500m (bronze) 3000m (bronze) 5000m		HEERENVEEN 5th 3000m				BEIJING 7th 3000m	

== Medals won ==
Championship	Gold (gold)	Silver (silver)	Bronze (bronze)
Dutch Single Distances	0	3	10
Dutch Allround	4	5	2
European Single Distances	0	1	0
World Single Distances	0	2	1
Olympic Games	1	0	0
European Championships Single Distances	0	0	1
World Championships Allround	0	0	1
World Cup GWC	0	1	0

== Cycling career ==
Carlijn Achtereekte
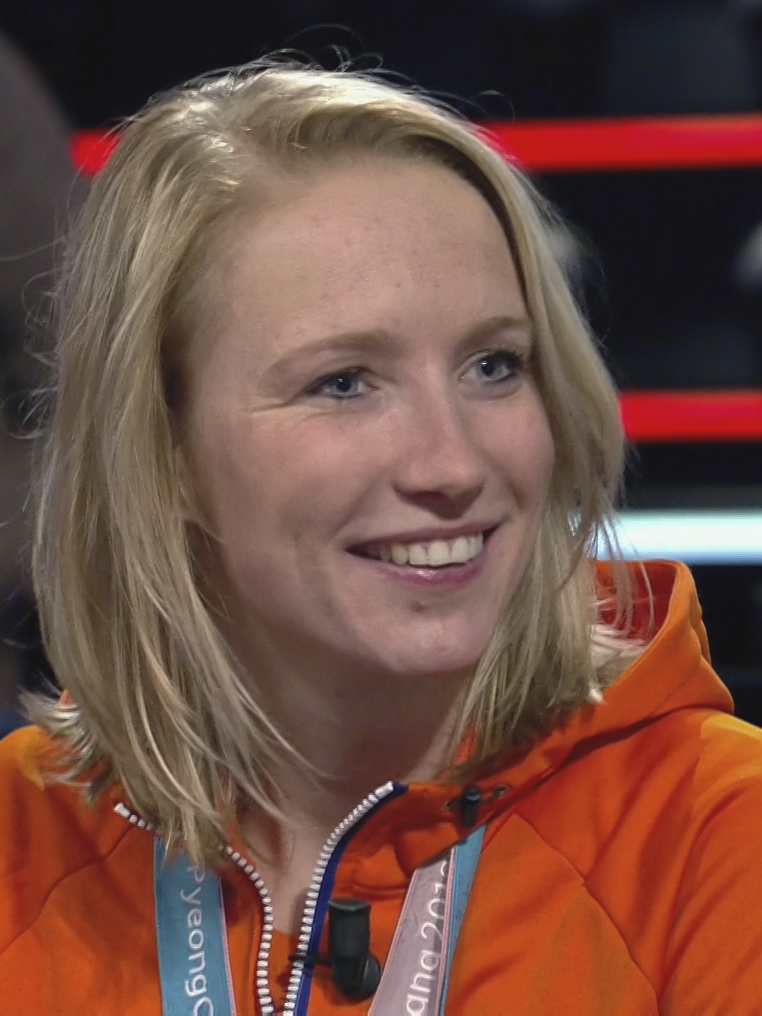

Cycling career
- Sport: Cycling
- Current team: Visma–Lease a Bike
- Discipline: Road
- Role: Rider

Professional team
- 2022–: Team Jumbo–Visma

Achtereekte signed with Team Jumbo–Visma on 1 June 2022.

=== Major results ===
2023
2nd La Picto-Charentaise
