= 2020 World Junior Speed Skating Championships =

2020 speed skating event

- Venue: Ice Arena Tomaszów Mazowiecki, Tomaszów Mazowiecki, Poland
- Dates: 21–23 February

Medalist men
1st place, gold medalist(s)		Stepan Chistiakov	Russia
2nd place, silver medalist(s)		Chung Jae-won	South Korea
3rd place, bronze medalist(s)		Pavel Taran	Russia

Medalist women
1st place, gold medalist(s)		Femke Kok	Netherlands
2nd place, silver medalist(s)		Robin Groot	Netherlands
3rd place, bronze medalist(s)		Alexa Scott	Canada

The 2020 World Junior Speed Skating Championships took place from 21 to 23 February 2020 in Tomaszów Mazowiecki, Poland.

== Schedule ==
All times are local (UTC+1).

Date	Time	Events
21 February	11:00	500 m women
21 February	11:00	500 m men
21 February	11:00	1500 m women
21 February	11:00	1500 m men
22 February	11:00	1000 m women
22 February	11:00	1000 m men
22 February	11:00	3000 m women
22 February	11:00	5000 m men
23 February	13:00	Team pursuit women
23 February	13:00	Team pursuit men
23 February	13:00	Team sprint women
23 February	13:00	Team sprint men
23 February	13:00	Mass start women
23 February	13:00	Mass start men

== Medal summary ==
=== Medal table ===
Rank	Nation	Gold	Silver	Bronze	Total
1	Netherlands (NED)	8	4	7	19
2	Japan (JPN)	3	4	2	9
2	Russia (RUS)	3	4	2	9
4	South Korea (KOR)	1	2	3	6
5	Norway (NOR)	1	0	0	1
6	Austria (AUT)	0	1	0	1
6	Italy (ITA)	0	1	0	1
8	Canada (CAN)	0	0	1	1
8	United States (USA)	0	0	1	1
Totals (9 entries)		16	16	16	48

=== Men's events ===
Event	Gold		Silver		Bronze	
500 m	Katsuhiro Kuratsubo; Japan	35.27	Artem Arefyev; Russia	35.28	Wataru Morishige; Japan	35.34
1000 m	Peder Kongshaug; Norway	1:10.81	Cho Sang-hyeok; South Korea	1:10.94	Katsuhiro Kuratsubo; Japan	1:10.95
1500 m	Tsubasa Horikawa; Japan	1:49.48	Stepan Chistiakov; Russia	1:49.88	Chung Jae-won; South Korea	1:50.08
5000 m	Daniil Aldoshkin; Russia	6:36.17	Yves Vergeer; Netherlands	6:39.58	Casey Dawson; United States	6:40.33
Mass start	Tsubasa Horikawa; Japan	30 pts	Gabriel Odor; Austria	20 pts	Shin Jae-wan; South Korea	10 pts
Team pursuit	Russia; Stepan Chistiakov; Daniil Aldoshkin; Pavel Taran	3:52.39	Japan; Motonaga Arito; Tsubasa Horikawa; Taiyo Morino	3:55.17	Netherlands; Yves Vergeer; Harm Visser; Jarle Gerrits	3:55.88
Team sprint	South Korea; Oh Sang-hun; Lee Byeong-hun; Cho Sang-hyeok	1:22.13	Russia; Artem Arefyev; Stepan Chistiakov; Daniil Aldoshkin	1:23.28	Netherlands; Stefan Westenbroek; Jarle Gerrits; Kai in 't Veld	1:24.01
Overall Classification	Stepan Chistiakov; Russia	149.341	Chung Jae-won; South Korea	150.643	Pavel Taran; Russia	150.648

=== Women's events ===
Event	Gold		Silver		Bronze	
500 m	Femke Kok; Netherlands	38.49	Moe Kumagai; Japan	39.14	Robin Groot; Netherlands	39.86
1000 m	Femke Kok; Netherlands	1:17.14	Robin Groot; Netherlands	1:17.97	Marrit Fledderus; Netherlands	1:19.06
1500 m	Robin Groot; Netherlands	2:01.04	Femke Kok; Netherlands	2:01.28	Merel Conijn; Netherlands	2:02.71
3000 m	Robin Groot; Netherlands	4:13.55	Momoka Horikawa; Japan	4:17.46	Merel Conijn; Netherlands	4:18.79
Mass start	Robin Groot; Netherlands	30 pts	Laura Peveri; Italy	20 pts	Merel Conijn; Netherlands	10 pts
Team pursuit	Netherlands; Merel Conijn; Robin Groot; Femke Kok	3:08.73	Japan; Ayuri Fukuoka; Momoka Horikawa; Rin Kosaka	3:11.83	Russia; Elizaveta Agafoshina; Alexandra Kravchenko; Anastasiia Grigoreva	3:14.32
Team sprint	Netherlands; Myrthe de Boer; Marrit Fledderus; Femke Kok	1:30.60	Russia; Marina Avtonomova; Irina Slesareva; Elizaveta Agafoshina	1:32.95	South Korea; Kim Min-hui; Shin Seung-heun; Kang Soo-min	1:33.05
Overall Classification	Femke Kok; Netherlands	161.087	Robin Groot; Netherlands	161.449	Alexa Scott; Canada	165.548
