= Merel Conijn =

Dutch speed skater (born 2001)

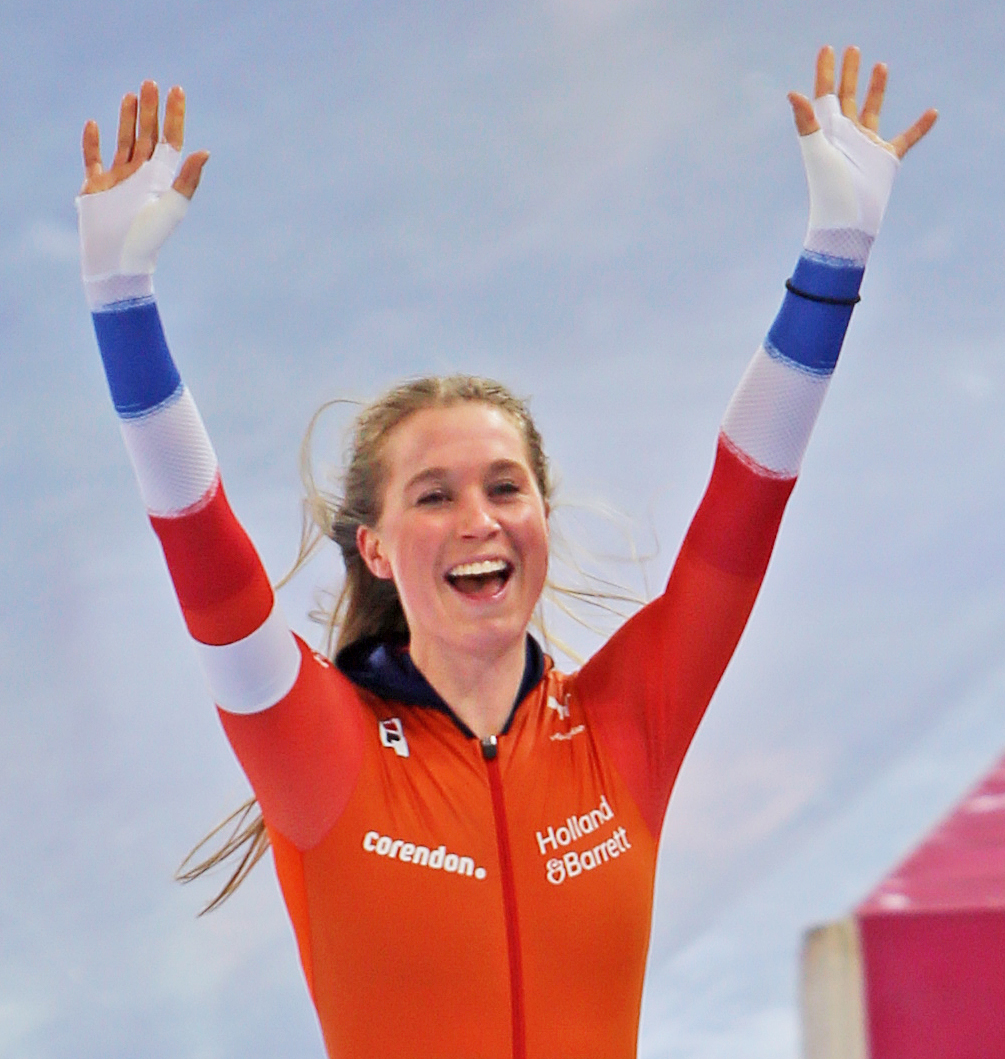
- Conijn in 2022

Personal information
- Nationality: Dutch
- Born: 19 October 2001 (age 25) Amsterdam, Netherlands
- Height: 1.74 m (5 ft 9 in)

Sport
- Country: Netherlands
- Sport: Speed skating
- Events: 1500 m, 3000 m, 5000 m
- Club: Team Novus
- Turned pro: 2021
Medal record
Women's speed skating
Representing the Netherlands
Olympic Games
| Silver medal – second place | 2026 Milano Cortina | 5000 m |
World Single Distances Championships
| Bronze medal – third place | 2025 Hamar | 3000 m |
| Bronze medal – third place | 2025 Hamar | 5000 m |
World Junior Championships
| Gold medal – first place | 2020 Tomaszów Mazowiecki | Team pursuit |
| Bronze medal – third place | 2020 Tomaszów Mazowiecki | 1500m |
| Bronze medal – third place | 2020 Tomaszów Mazowiecki | 3000m |
| Bronze medal – third place | 2020 Tomaszów Mazowiecki | Mass start |

Merel Conijn (born 19 October 2001) is a Dutch allround speed skater.

== Career ==
Conijn won the Dutch Junior Allround Championships in 2019. She won the gold medal in the team pursuit event at the 2020 World Junior Speed Skating Championships in Tomaszów Mazowiecki together with Robin Groot and Femke Kok. Conijn won the 2022 Dutch Allround Championships which qualified her for the 2022 World Allround Championships in Hamar.

In 2021 she became a member of Team Worldstream-Corendon. One year later, she moved to Team Jumbo-Visma, before switching to Team AH Zaanlander in 2024.

In February 2026, Conijn represented the Netherlands at the 2026 Winter Olympics in the 3000 metres and 5000 metres events. She made her Olympic debut on 7 February, when she finished ninth in the 3000 m. Five days later, she won a silver medal in the 5000 m event, finishing just one-tenth of a second behind gold medallist Francesca Lollobrigida.

Following the 2025–26 season, Conijn left Team AH Zaanlander to join international speed skating squad Team Novus, coached by Johan de Wit.

== Records ==
=== Personal records ===
Personal records
Speed skating
| Event | Result | Date | Location | Notes |
| 500 m | 39.17 | 15 January 2022 | Thialf, Heerenveen | |
| 1000 m | 1:18.17 | 9 October 2021 | Max Aicher Arena, Inzell | |
| 1500 m | 1:55.28 | 30 October 2026 | Thialf, Heerenveen | |
| 3000 m | 3:56.69 | 15 February 2025 | Thialf, Heerenveen | |
| 5000 m | 6:41.48 | 2 November 2025 | Thialf, Heerenveen | |

At the end of the 2024–25 season, Conijn occupied the 17th position on the Adelskalender with a score of 157.927 points

== Tournament overview ==
| Season | Dutch Championships Single Distances | Dutch Championships Allround | European Championships Single Distances | European Championships Allround | World Championships Single Distances | World Championships Allround | World Championships Sprint | World Cup | Dutch Championships Junior Allround | World Championships Junior |
|---|---|---|---|---|---|---|---|---|---|---|
| 2019–20 | | | | | | | | Junior WC (silver) 3000m (bronze) Team Pursuit | ENSCHEDE Junior A 4th 500m (bronze) 1500m 7th 1000m (silver) 3000m (bronze) overall | TOMASZOW MAZOWIECKI (bronze) 1500m (bronze) 3000m (bronze) Mass start (gold) Team pursuit |
| 2020–21 | HEERENVEEN 7th 3000m 6th 5000m | HEERENVEEN 9th 500m 17th 3000m 8th 1500m DNS 5000m NC11 overall | | | | | | | | |
| 2021–22 | HEERENVEEN 17th 1500m 7th 3000m 6th 5000m 11th Mass start | HEERENVEEN (bronze) 500m (silver) 3000m (silver) 1500m (gold) 5000m (gold) overall | | | | HAMAR 11th 500m 6th 3000m 4th 1500m 6th 5000m 6th overall | | | | |
