= 2025 World Single Distances Speed Skating Championships – Women's 5000 metres =

Women's 5000 metres at the 2025 World Single Distances Speed Skating Championships
- Venue: Vikingskipet
- Location: Hamar, Norway
- Dates: 15 March
- Competitors: 12 from 9 nations
- Winning time: 6:56.38

Medalists
gold medal	Francesca Lollobrigida	Italy
silver medal	Ragne Wiklund	Norway
bronze medal	Merel Conijn	Netherlands

The Women's 5000 metres competition at the 2025 World Single Distances Speed Skating Championships took place on 15 March 2025.

== Qualification ==
A total of 12 entry quotas were available for the event, with a maximum of two per country. The entry quotas were assigned to countries following a Special Qualification Ranking List based on rankings and performances of skaters during the 2024–25 ISU Speed Skating World Cup.

== Records ==
Prior to this competition, the existing world and track records were as follows.

	Time	Athlete	Date
World Record	6:39.02	Natalya Voronina (RUS)	15 February 2020
Track Record	6:50.08	Martina Sáblíková (CZE)	21 November 2009

== Results ==
The race was started at 15:37.

Rank	Pair	Lane	Name	Country	Time	Diff
1st place, gold medalist(s)	5	i	Francesca Lollobrigida	Italy	6:56.38	
2nd place, silver medalist(s)	6	i	Ragne Wiklund	Norway	6:56.56	+0.18
3rd place, bronze medalist(s)	6	o	Merel Conijn	Netherlands	6:58.49	+2.11
4	4	i	Isabelle Weidemann	Canada	7:00.27	+3.89
5	5	o	Martina Sáblíková	Czech Republic	7:03.20	+6.82
6	4	o	Marijke Groenewoud	Netherlands	7:04.51	+8.13
7	2	i	Tai Zhien	China	7:08.77	+12.39
8	1	i	Josie Hofmann	Germany	7:10.06	+13.68
9	3	i	Momoka Horikawa	Japan	7:10.18	+13.80
10	3	o	Sandrine Tas	Belgium	7:10.99	+14.61
11	2	o	Laura Hall	Canada	7:16.11	+19.73
12	1	o	Ahenaer Adake	China	7:16.93	+20.55
