= Arianna Pruisscher =

Dutch cyclist and speed skater

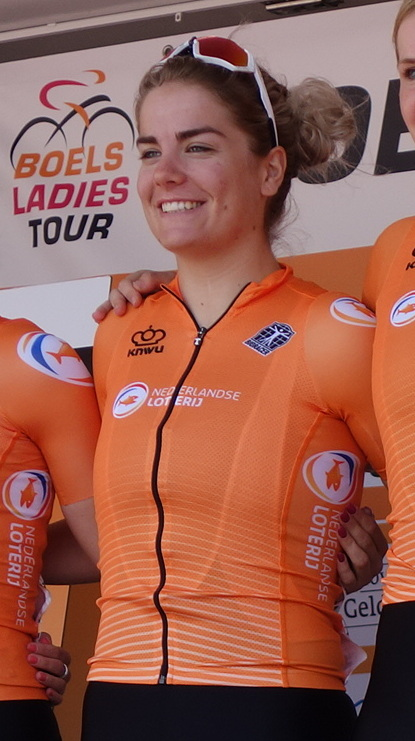
- Pruisscher during the 2019 Holland Ladies Tour

Personal information
- Nationality: Netherlands
- Born: August 7, 1998 (age 28) Nieuw-Dordrecht, Netherlands

Sport
- Country: Netherlands
- Sport: Speed skating
- Events: 3000 m, 5000 m
- Club: A6.nl/KMC
- Turned pro: 2022

Arianna Pruisscher (born 7 August 1998 in Nieuw-Dordrecht, Netherlands) is a Dutch long track and marathon speed skater, currently representing A6.nl/KMC. Prior to her speed skating career she was a professional cyclist for French team Stade Rochelais Charente-Maritime and earlier with Team Albert Heijn Zaanlander.

In October 2022, she finished fourth in the 5000 m at World Cup qualifying, earning a start at the 2022–23 ISU Speed Skating World Cup in Calgary, Canada.

In summer 2024, Pruisscher won the women's category of the Gran Fondo World Championship (women 19–34), earning a rainbow jersey despite the event's non‑UCI status. She credited her win to her fitness and perseverance after a severe crash earlier in Belgium.

Shortly after, she took victory in the Ronde van Twente on 6 July 2024, riding as part of preparation for the skating season. Pruisscher outsprinted Dina Scavone and Jesse Vandenbulcke, noting that windy conditions shaped the race and that the reduced finishing circuit favored her sprint strength.

== Injuries and recovery ==
During the GP Yvonne Reijnders in Herentals (Belgium) in August 2024, Pruisscher crashed heavily, hitting a traffic bump and landing forcefully. She continued racing, but later experienced severe headaches, dizziness, nausea and fainting spells at work symptoms that led her to suspect a concussion. Despite still winning the Gran Fondo rainbow jersey, she later acknowledged that victory was based on her baseline fitness rather than form.

She attempted to return during the 2024–25 marathon season, but underwhelming performances, like a 22nd place in Breda, offered a stark "reality check." As of end-2024, she decided to pause planning for results and focus fully on recovery rather than projections.

== Personal records ==
As of 22 December 2023:

Distance	Time	Date	Venue	Country
500 m	42.45	10 January 2015	Heerenveen	Netherlands
1000 m	1:23.64	7 March 2014	Heerenveen	Netherlands
1500 m	2:03.98	21 October 2022	Heerenveen	Netherlands
3000 m	4:10.57	20 October 2023	Heerenveen	Netherlands
5000 m	7:04.38	16 December 2022	Calgary	Canada
