= Joy Beune =

Dutch speed skater (born 1999)

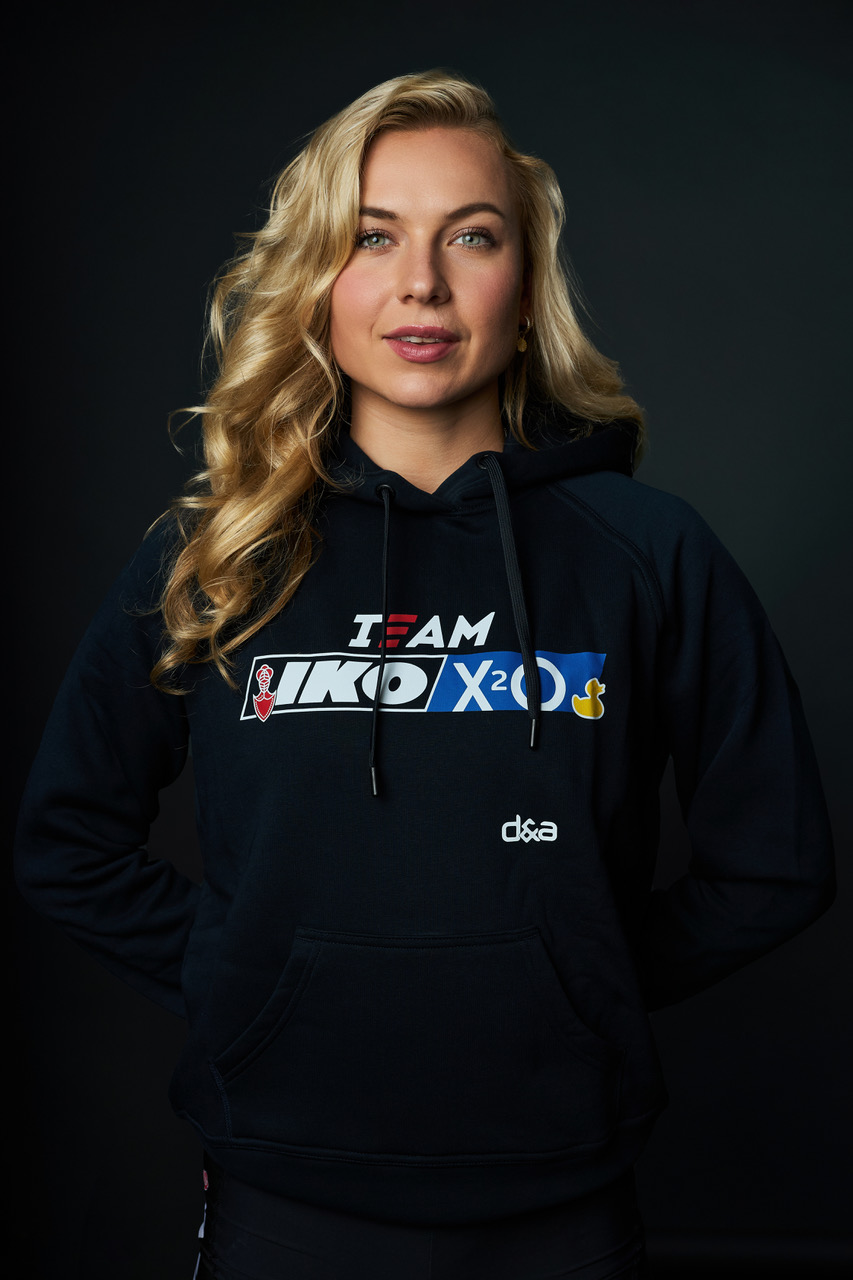
- Beune in 2025

Personal information
- Nationality: Dutch
- Born: 28 April 1999 (age 27) Borne, Netherlands
- Height: 1.72 m (5 ft 8 in)
- Weight: 60 kg (132 lb)

Sport
- Country: Netherlands
- Sport: Speed skating
- Events: 1500 m, 3000 m, 5000 m
- Club: Team IKO-X²O
- Turned pro: 2018
Medal record
Women's speed skating
Representing the Netherlands
Olympic Games
Silver medal – second place	2026 Milano Cortina	Team pursuit
World Single Distances Championships
Gold medal – first place	2024 Calgary	5000 m
Gold medal – first place	2024 Calgary	Team pursuit
Gold medal – first place	2025 Hamar	1500 m
Gold medal – first place	2025 Hamar	3000 m
Gold medal – first place	2025 Hamar	Team pursuit
Silver medal – second place	2019 Inzell	Team pursuit
Bronze medal – third place	2024 Calgary	1500 m
World Allround Championships
Gold medal – first place	2024 Inzell	Allround
European Championships
Gold medal – first place	2024 Heerenveen	Team pursuit
Silver medal – second place	2025 Heerenveen	Allround
Bronze medal – third place	2024 Heerenveen	1500 m
Junior World Championships
Gold medal – first place	2017 Warsaw	3000 m
Silver medal – second place	2017 Warsaw	Allround
Gold medal – first place	2018 Utah	Allround
Gold medal – first place	2018 Utah	1000 m
Gold medal – first place	2018 Utah	1500 m
Gold medal – first place	2018 Utah	3000 m

Joy Beune (born 28 April 1999) is a Dutch allround speed skater who specialises in the middle distances.

== Career ==
Beune won the silver medal at the 2017 World Junior Speed Skating Championships in Warsaw. The following year, at the 2018 World Junior Speed Skating Championships in Utah, she became junior world champion. She won the 1000 m, 1500 m and 3000 m events and set world junior records at these distances.

In 2018 she became a member of Team LottoNL-Jumbo, signing a contract for two years. In 2022 she moved to Team IKO, and in 2023 she prolonged her contract until season 2025–2026.

At the 2025 Dutch Olympic Trials, Beune missed out on qualification for the Olympic 1500 m race despite being the reigning world champion in that distance. She did manage, however, to secure herself a place in the Olympic squad for the 3000 metres and team pursuit events. At the 2026 Winter Olympics, Beune won a silver medal in the team pursuit. She placed fourth in the 3000 m.

== Personal life ==
Beune has been in a relationship with fellow speed skater and three-time Olympic champion Kjeld Nuis since 2019. The pair live together in Heerenveen.

== Records ==
=== Personal records ===
Personal records
Speed skating
Event	Result	Date	Location	Notes
500 m	38.69	9 March 2018	Utah Olympic Oval, Salt Lake City	
1000 m	1:14.21	10 March 2018	Utah Olympic Oval, Salt Lake City	
1500 m	1:51.05	15 November 2025	Utah Olympic Oval, Salt Lake City	
3000 m	3:53.69	14 November 2025	Utah Olympic Oval, Salt Lake City	
5000 m	6:45.76	24 January 2025	Olympic Oval, Calgary	

At the end of the 2023 speed skating season, Beune occupied the 12th position on the Adelskalender with a score of 157.598 points

=== World records established ===
Nr.	Event	Result	Date	Location	Notes
1.	Team sprint	1:28.40	25 November 2017	Inzell	Junior world record
2.	Team pursuit	3:02.72	3 March 2018	Salt Lake City	Junior world record
3.	1500 meter	1:54.21	9 March 2018	Inzell	Junior world record
4.	Mini-combination	153.776	9/10 March 2018	Salt Lake City	Junior world record
5.	1000 meter	1:14.21	10 March 2018	Salt Lake City	Junior world record
6.	3000 meter	3:59.47	10 March 2018	Salt Lake City	Junior world record
7.	Team pursuit	2:59.55	11 March 2018	Salt Lake City	Junior world record

== Tournament overview ==
Season	Dutch Championships Single Distances	Dutch Championships Allround	Dutch Championships Junior Allround	European Championships Single Distances	European Championships Allround	World Championships Single Distances	World Championships Allround	World Championships Sprint	World Cup GWC	Viking Race	World Championships Junior
2013–14			TILBURG Junior C 18th 500m 14th 1500m 14th overall								
2014–15			DEVENTER Junior C 13th 500m 14th 1500m 12th 1000m DNS 3000m NC overall								
2015–16			ALKMAAR Junior B 7th 500m (gold) 1500m (silver) 1000m (gold) 3000m (gold) overall							B2 (silver) 500m (gold) 1500m (gold) 1000m (gold) 3000m (gold) overall	
2016–17	HEERENVEEN 13th 1500m		HEERENVEEN Junior A (gold) 500m (bronze) 1500m (bronze) 1000m (silver) 3000m (silver) overall								HELSINKI 14th 500m 4th 1500m (silver) 1500m (gold) 3000m (silver) allround (bronze) 1000m (gold) 3000m
2017–18	HEERENVEEN 15th 500m 7th 1000m 6th 1500m		ENSCHEDE Junior A (silver) 500m (silver) 1500m (silver) 1000m (gold) 3000m (gold) overall								SALT LAKE CITY 5th 500m (gold) 1500m (gold) 1000m (gold) 3000m (gold) allround (gold) team pursuit
2018–19	HEERENVEEN 5th 1500m 6th 3000m	HEERENVEEN (gold) 500m (bronze) 3000m (gold) 1500m (bronze) 5000m (silver) overall				INZELL (silver) team pursuit			8th 1500m 37th 3000/5000m		
2019–20	HEERENVEEN 10th 1000m (bronze) 1500m 8th 3000m	HEERENVEEN (bronze) 500m 6th 3000m (bronze) 1500m 5th 5000m 4th overall		HEERENVEEN 7th 1500m		SALT LAKE CITY 10th 1500m					
2020–21	HEERENVEEN 8th 1500m 6th 3000m 5th 5000m	HEERENVEEN 8th 500m 7th 3000m 7th 1500m 6th 5000m 5th overall			HEERENVEEN 7th 500m 5th 3000m (bronze) 1500m 5th 5000m 5th overall	HEERENVEEN 6th 3000m			4th 3000m		
2021–22	HEERENVEEN 9th 1500m 4th 3000m 4th 5000m	HEERENVEEN 6th 500m (gold) 3000m (gold) 1500m (silver) 5000m (silver) overall							36th 1500m 5th 3000/5000m		
2022–23	HEERENVEEN 4th 1500m (silver) 3000m	HEERENVEEN 6th 500m (bronze) 3000m (bronze) 1500m 6th 5000m (bronze) overall				HEERENVEEN 4th 3000m DQ team pursuit			6th 1500m (bronze) 3000/5000m		

== World Cup overview ==
Season	1500 meter					
2018–2019	10th	8th	–	1st (b)	3rd place, bronze medalist(s)	6th
2020–2021	–	–				
2021–2022	–	–	–	2nd(b)	–	
2022–2023	7th	6th	11th	7th	5th	4th

Season	3000/5000 meter					
2018–2019	–	–	–	–	1st (b)	–
2020–2021	3rd place, bronze medalist(s)	5th				
2021–2022	5th	11th*	7th	7th	8th	
2022–2023	8th	4th	5th	4th	4th	3rd place, bronze medalist(s)
