= 2022 World Allround Speed Skating Championships =

International speed skating competition

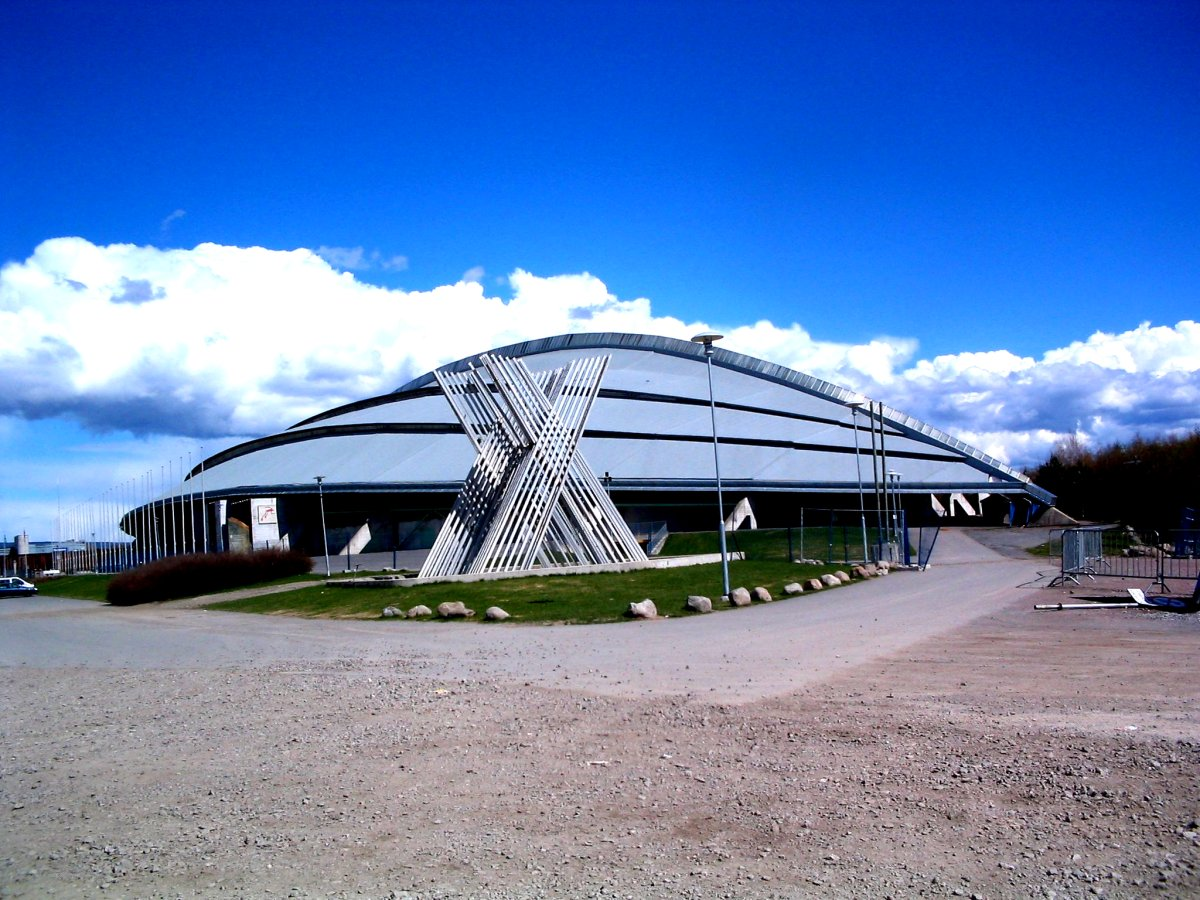
- Location: Hamar, Norway
- Venue: Vikingskipet
- Dates: 5–6 March

Medalist men
1st place, gold medalist(s)		Nils van der Poel	Sweden
2nd place, silver medalist(s)		Patrick Roest	Netherlands
3rd place, bronze medalist(s)		Bart Swings	Belgium

Medalist women
1st place, gold medalist(s)		Irene Schouten	Netherlands
2nd place, silver medalist(s)		Miho Takagi	Japan
3rd place, bronze medalist(s)		Antoinette de Jong	Netherlands

The 2022 World Allround Speed Skating Championships were held at the Vikingskipet in Hamar, Norway, on 5 and 6 March 2022.

== Schedule ==
All times are local (UTC+1).

Date	Time	Event
5 March	14:00	Women's 500 m
5 March	14:26	Men's 500 m
5 March	15:05	Women's 3000 m
5 March	16:09	Men's 5000 m
6 March	14:00	Women's 1500 m
6 March	14:44	Men's 1500 m
6 March	15:31	Women's 5000 m
6 March	16:21	Men's 10,000 m

== Medal summary ==
=== Medal table ===
* Host nation (Norway)

Rank	Nation	Gold	Silver	Bronze	Total
1	Netherlands	1	1	1	3
2	Sweden	1	0	0	1
3	Japan	0	1	0	1
4	Belgium	0	0	1	1
Totals (4 entries)		2	2	2	6

=== Medalists ===
Event	Gold		Silver		Bronze	
Men	Nils van der Poel; Sweden	148.696	Patrick Roest; Netherlands	149.836	Bart Swings; Belgium	150.218
Women	Irene Schouten; Netherlands	158.974	Miho Takagi; Japan	159.305	Antoinette de Jong; Netherlands	159.798
