= Irene Schouten =

Dutch speed skater (born 1992)

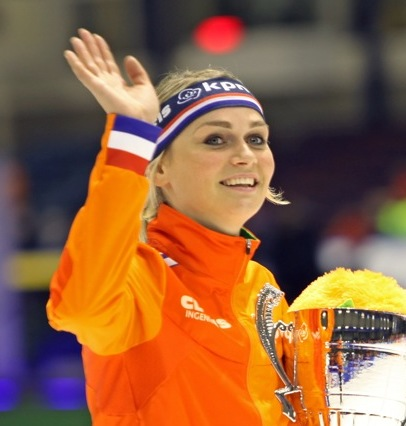
- Schouten after winning the mass start at the 2015–16 ISU World Cup

Personal information
- Nationality: Dutch
- Born: 21 June 1992 (age 34) Zwaagdijk-Oost, Netherlands
- Height: 1.68 m (5 ft 6 in)
- Weight: 59 kg (130 lb)

Sport
- Country: Netherlands
- Sport: Speed skating
- Event(s): 3000 m, 5000 m, mass start
- Club: Team Zaanlander
- Retired: 2024
Medal record
Speed skating
Representing the Netherlands
Olympic Games
Gold medal – first place	2022 Beijing	3000 m
Gold medal – first place	2022 Beijing	5000 m
Gold medal – first place	2022 Beijing	Mass start
Bronze medal – third place	2018 Pyeongchang	Mass start
Bronze medal – third place	2022 Beijing	Team pursuit
World Single Distances Championships
Gold medal – first place	2015 Heerenveen	Mass start
Gold medal – first place	2019 Inzell	Mass start
Gold medal – first place	2021 Heerenveen	5000 m
Gold medal – first place	2021 Heerenveen	Team pursuit
Gold medal – first place	2023 Heerenveen	5000 m
Gold medal – first place	2024 Calgary	3000 m
Gold medal – first place	2024 Calgary	Mass start
Gold medal – first place	2024 Calgary	Team pursuit
Silver medal – second place	2023 Heerenveen	3000 m
Silver medal – second place	2024 Calgary	5000 m
Bronze medal – third place	2016 Kolomna	5000 m
Bronze medal – third place	2020 Salt Lake City	Mass start
Bronze medal – third place	2021 Heerenveen	3000 m
Bronze medal – third place	2021 Heerenveen	Mass start
Bronze medal – third place	2023 Heerenveen	Mass start
World Allround Championships
Gold medal – first place	2022 Hamar	Allround
European Championships
Gold medal – first place	2020 Heerenveen	Mass start
Gold medal – first place	2022 Heerenveen	3000 m
Gold medal – first place	2022 Heerenveen	Team pursuit
Gold medal – first place	2022 Heerenveen	Mass start
Gold medal – first place	2024 Heerenveen	Team pursuit
Silver medal – second place	2021 Heerenveen	Allround
Silver medal – second place	2024 Heerenveen	3000 m
Silver medal – second place	2024 Heerenveen	Mass start

Irene Schouten (Dutch pronunciation: [iˈreːnə ˈsxʌutə(n)]; born 21 June 1992) is a retired Dutch speed skater who competed in allround marathon and inline-skating events. She is a five-time Olympic medalist and a triple Olympic Champion, having won the 3,000m, 5,000m, and mass start events at the 2022 Beijing Games. As of 12 February 2022, she holds the Olympic record in both distances (3000m & 5000m). Her coach is Jillert Anema. Schouten has announced that she is retiring as a competing speed skater.

On 2 March 2014, Schouten finished in third place at the 2014 Dutch Allround Championships and qualified for the 2014 World Allround Championships in Thialf, Heerenveen. At the 2018 Winter Olympic Games, she won the bronze medal in the mass start event.

At the 2022 Winter Olympic Games, Schouten became the most successful Dutch Olympic athlete of the event by winning four medals, including three gold. In comparison: Schouten would have ranked 13th in the overall medal ranking by country, by herself, outscoring the entire athlete delegations of notable wintersport nations like Italy and South Korea. Schouten is the current Olympic and Dutch record holder in the 5000 metres.

In February 2024, Schouten announced her retirement from competitions.

== Records ==
=== Personal records ===
Personal records
Speed skating
Event	Result	Date	Location	Notes
500 m	39.24	5 March 2022	Vikingskipet, Hamar	
1000 m	1:18.41	27 October 2013	Thialf, Heerenveen	
1500 m	1:52.12	5 December 2021	Utah Olympic Oval, Salt Lake City	
3000 m	3:52.89	3 December 2021	Utah Olympic Oval, Salt Lake City	Current Dutch record.
5000 m	6:41.25	5 March 2023	Thialf, Heerenveen	Current Dutch record.

Schouten occupies the 3rd position on the Adelskalender with a score of 155.553 points.

=== Olympic records ===
Olympic records
Women's speed skating
Event	Result	Date	Location	Notes
3000 m	3:56.93	5 February 2022	Beijing National Speed Skating Oval, Beijing	
5000 m	6:43.51	10 February 2022	Beijing National Speed Skating Oval, Beijing	

== Tournament overview ==
Season	Dutch Championships Single Distances	Dutch Championships Allround	World Championships Allround	Dutch Championships Sprint	World Championships Junior	World Championships Single Distances	Olympic Games	European Championships Single Distances	World Cup GWC	European Championships Allround
2009–10	HEERENVEEN 18th 3000m									
2010–11	HEERENVEEN 17th 1000m 4th 3000m 6th 5000m	HEERENVEEN 7th 500m 12th 3000m 6th 1500m 9th 5000m 8th overall			SEINÄJOKI 15th 500m 12th 1500m 14th 1000m 9th 3000m 11th overall DQ team pursuit				50th 3000/5000m	
2011–12										
2012–13	HEERENVEEN 19th 1000m 8th 1500m 15th 3000m (gold) mass start	HEERENVEEN 10th 500m 13th 3000m 15th 1500m DNQ 5000m 11th overall		GRONINGEN 17th 500m 10th 1000m 16th 500m 9th 1000m 11th overall					4th mass start	
2013–14	HEERENVEEN 20th 1000m 12th 1500m 18th 3000m (gold) mass start	AMSTERDAM 7th 500m (bronze) 3000m (silver) 1500m (bronze) 5000m (bronze) overall	HEERENVEEN 10th 500m 5th 3000m 11th 1500m 5th 5000m 6th overall						(silver) mass start	
2014–15	HEERENVEEN 18th 1000m 10th 1500m 15th 3000m 9th 5000m (gold) mass start	HEERENVEEN 9th 500m 12th 3000m 11th 1500m DNQ 5000m 11th overall		GRONINGEN 21st 500m 14th 1000m 23rd 500m 14th 1000m 14th overall		HEERENVEEN (gold) mass start			(silver) mass start	
2015–16	HEERENVEEN 12th 1500m 6th 3000m (silver) 5000m (gold) mass start	HEERENVEEN 17th 500m 7th 3000m 9th 1500m DNQ 5000m 9th overall				KOLOMNA (bronze) 5000m 10th mass start			(bronze) 3000/5000m (gold) mass start	
2016–17	HEERENVEEN 6th 3000m 5th 5000m (gold) Mass start					GANGNEUNG 22nd mass start			60th 3000/5000m 4th mass start	
2017–18	HEERENVEEN (bronze) 3000m 4th 5000m						GANGNEUNG (bronze) mass start		8th 3000/5000m 16th mass start	
2018–19	HEERENVEEN 12th 3000m (gold) mass start					INZELL (gold) mass start			(silver) mass start	
2019–20	HEERENVEEN 8th 1500m (silver) 3000m (silver) 5000m (gold) mass start					SALT LAKE CITY 7th 3000m 7th 5000m		HEERENVEEN 7th 3000m (gold) mass start	39th 3000/5000m (silver) mass start	
2020–21	HEERENVEEN 6th 1500m (gold) 3000m (gold) 5000m					HEERENVEEN (bronze) 3000m (gold) 5000m (bronze) mass start (gold) team pursuit			(gold) 3000/5000m (gold) mass start (silver) team pursuit 10th 1500m	HEERENVEEN 9th 500m (gold) 3000m 8th 1500m (silver) 5000m (silver) overall
2021–22	HEERENVEEN 4th 1500m (gold) 3000m (gold) 5000m		HAMAR 7th 500m (gold) 3000m 5th 1500m (silver) 5000m (gold) overall				BEIJING (gold) 3000m (gold) 5000m (bronze) team pursuit (gold) mass start	HEERENVEEN (gold) 3000m (gold) mass start (gold) team pursuit	17th 1500m (gold) 3000/5000m (bronze) mass start (bronze) team pursuit	
2022–23	HEERENVEEN (bronze) 3000m (gold) 5000m (gold) mass start					HEERENVEEN (silver) 3000m (gold) 5000m (bronze) mass start DQ team pursuit			45th 1500m 7th 3000/5000m 5th mass start	

== World Cup overview ==
Season	1500 meter					
2010–11						
2011–12						
2012–13						
2013–14						
2014–15						
2015–16						
2016–17						
2017–18						
2018–19						
2019–20	–	–	–	–	1st(b)	–
2020–21	6th	17th				
2021–22	8th	8th	6th	–	–	
2022–23	–	–	–	2nd(b)	–	–

Season	3000/5000 meter					
2010–11	21st	DQ	–	–	–	–
2011–12						
2012–13						
2013–14						
2014–15						
2015–16	2nd place, silver medalist(s)	5th	10th	4th	3rd place, bronze medalist(s)	5th
2016–17	–	–	–	4th	–	–
2017–18	5th	5th	11th	–	–	4th
2018–19						
2019–20	–	–	–	–	1st(b)	–
2020–21	1st place, gold medalist(s)	3rd place, bronze medalist(s)				
2021–22	1st place, gold medalist(s)	1st place, gold medalist(s)	1st place, gold medalist(s)		1st place, gold medalist(s)	
2022–23	2nd place, silver medalist(s)	1st place, gold medalist(s)	7th	1st place, gold medalist(s)	–	–

Season	Mass start						
2010–11							
2011–12							
2012–13	–	–	4th	1st place, gold medalist(s)			
2013–14	3rd place, bronze medalist(s)	2nd place, silver medalist(s)					
2014–15	3rd place, bronze medalist(s)	2nd place, silver medalist(s)	1st place, gold medalist(s)	3rd place, bronze medalist(s)	1st place, gold medalist(s)	16th	
2015–16	2nd place, silver medalist(s)	1st place, gold medalist(s)	1st place, gold medalist(s)	8th	1st place, gold medalist(s)		
2016–17	–	–	12th	2nd place, silver medalist(s)	1st place, gold medalist(s)		
2017–18	11th	12th	–	9th			
2018–19	2nd place, silver medalist(s)	–	1st place, gold medalist(s)	2nd place, silver medalist(s)	1st place, gold medalist(s)		
2019–20	1st place, gold medalist(s)	2nd place, silver medalist(s)	1st place, gold medalist(s)	1st place, gold medalist(s)	–	3rd place, bronze medalist(s)	
2020–21	1st place, gold medalist(s)	1st place, gold medalist(s)					
2021–22	1st place, gold medalist(s)	1st place, gold medalist(s)	1st place, gold medalist(s)	4th	1st place, gold medalist(s)	–	–
2022–23	3rd place, bronze medalist(s)	1st place, gold medalist(s)	1st place, gold medalist(s)	1st place, gold medalist(s)	–	–	

Season	Team pursuit		
2020–21			
2021–22	3rd place, bronze medalist(s)	2nd place, silver medalist(s)	–
2022–23	2nd place, silver medalist(s)	4th	–

- DNQ = Did not qualify
- DQ = Disqualified
- – = Did not participate
- (b) = Division B

Awards
Preceded by Sifan Hassan	Dutch Sportswoman of the Year; 2022	Succeeded by Femke Bol
Olympic Games
Preceded by Kjeld Nuis; Lindsay van Zundert	Flag bearer for the Netherlands; 2022 closing ceremony	Succeeded by Lois Abbingh; Worthy de Jong
