= 2022 KNSB Dutch Single Distance Championships – Women's 1000 m =

Dutch speed skating competition

- Venue: Thialf, Heerenveen
- Dates: 31 October 2021
- Competitors: 24 skaters

Medalist women
1st place, gold medalist(s)		Jutta Leerdam	NED
2nd place, silver medalist(s)		Femke Kok	NED
3rd place, bronze medalist(s)		Ireen Wüst	NED

The women's 1000 meters at the 2022 KNSB Dutch Single Distance Championships in Heerenveen took place at the Thialf ice skating rink on Sunday, 31 October 2021. There were 24 participants. Although the tournament was held in 2021 it was the 2022 edition as it was part of the 2021–2022 speed skating season. The first five skaters were eligible for the following World Cup tournaments.

== Statistics ==
=== Result ===
Rank	Skater	Time
1st place, gold medalist(s)	Jutta Leerdam	1:13.15 TR
2nd place, silver medalist(s)	Femke Kok	1:14.16
3rd place, bronze medalist(s)	Ireen Wüst	1:14.42
4	Marrit Fledderus	1:14.70 PR
5	Antoinette de Jong	1:14.76
6	Lotte van Beek	1:15.23
7	Letitia de Jong	1:15.25
8	Jorien ter Mors	1:15.26
9	Helga Drost	1:15.36 PR
10	Sanneke de Neeling	1:15.37
11	Elisa Dul	1:15.44
12	Myrthe de Boer	1:15.51 PR
13	Esmé Stollenga	1:15.704 PR
13	Michelle de Jong	1:15.704
15	Marijke Groenewoud	1:15.90
16	Isabel Grevelt	1:16.14 PR
17	Dione Voskamp	1:16.62
18	Naomi Verkerk	1:16.68 PR
19	Leoni Bats	1:16.73 PR
20	Isabelle van Elst	1:16.97
21	Kin Talsma	1:17.24 PR
22	Femke Beuling	1:17.39
23	Esther Kiel	1:17.54 PR
24	Marit Beijnum	1:18.30 PR

Referee: Berri de Jonge. Assistant: Suzan van den Belt. Starter: Marco Hesselink
Start: 16:21.00 hr. Finish: 16:50.52 hr.

=== Draw ===
Heat	Inner lane	Outer lane
1	Kim Talsma	Naomi Verkerk
2	Marit van Beijnum	Leoni Bats
3	Esther Kiel	Femke Beuling
4	Isabel Grevelt	Esmé Stollenga
5	Helga Drost	Myrthe de Boer
6	Letitia de Jong	Dione Voskamp
7	Elisa Dul	Sanneke de Neeling
8	Lotte van Beek	Marrit Fledderus
9	Marijke Groenewoud	Isabelle van Elst
10	Jutta Leerdam	Femke Kok
11	Ireen Wüst	Antoinette de Jong
12	Michelle de Jong	Jorien ter Mors
