= 2022 KNSB Dutch Single Distance Championships – Women's 500 m =

Dutch speed skating competition

- Venue: Thialf, Heerenveen, Netherlands
- Date: 30 October 2022
- Competitors: 24 skaters

Medalist men
1st place, gold medalist(s)		Jutta Leerdam	NED
2nd place, silver medalist(s)		Femke Kok	NED
3rd place, bronze medalist(s)		Michelle de Jong	NED

The women's 500 meter at the 2022 KNSB Dutch Single Distance Championships took place in Heerenveen at the Thialf ice skating rink on Saturday 30 October 2021. Although the tournament was held in 2021 it was the 2022 edition as it was part of the 2021–2022 speed skating season. There were 24 participants who raced twice over 500m so that all skaters had to start once in the inner lane and once in the outer lane. The first 5 skaters were eligible for the following World Cup tournaments.

== Statistics ==
=== Result ===
Rank	Skater	Time 1st 500m	Time 2nd 500m	Samalog
1st place, gold medalist(s)	Jutta Leerdam	37.588	37.494	75.082
2nd place, silver medalist(s)	Femke Kok	37.751	37.6299	75.380
3rd place, bronze medalist(s)	Michelle de Jong	37.774	37.903	75.677
4	Marrit Fledderus	37.903 PR	37.962	75.865
5	Dione Voskamp	37.891 PR	38.120	76.011
6	Jorien ter Mors	38.292	38.003	76.295
7	Femke Beuling	38.649	38.094 PR	76.743
8	Isabel Grevelt	38.274 PR	38.564	76.838
9	Naomi Verkerk	38.258 PR	38.631	76..889
10	Isabelle van Elst	38.509	38.438	76.947
11	Esmé Stollenga	38.236	38.755	76.991
12	Marit van Beijnum	38.623 PR	38.528 PR	77.151
13	Letitia de Jong	38.435	38.740	77.151
14	Maud Lugters	38.724	38.554 PR	77.278
15	Lotte van Beek	38.571	38.812	77.383
16	Jildou Hoekstra	38.799 PR	38.913	77.712
17	Myrthe de Boer	38.829 PR	39.089	77.918
18	Pien Smit	39.072 PR	39.146	78.218
19	Anna Boersma	39.170 PR	39.389	78.559
20	Danouk Bannink	39.464	39.678	79.142
21	Sacha van der Weide	39.698	39.673	79.371
22	Pien Hersma	40.396	39.850 PR	80.246
23	Helga Drost	38.251 PR	1:13.972	112.213
NC	Sanneke de Neeling	DNF	WDR	NC

=== Draw 1st 500m ===
Heat	Inner lane	Outer lane
1	Sacha van der Weide	Pien Hersma
2	Myrthe de Boer	Danouk Bannink
3	Anna Boersma	Jildou Hoekstra
4	Naomi Verkerk	Isabel Grevelt
5	Lotte van Beek	Pien Smit
6	Sanneke de Neeling	Marit van Beijnum
7	Marrit Fledderus	Esmé Stollenga
8	Femke Beuling	Maud Lugters
9	Helga Drost	Letitia de Jong
10	Michelle de Jong	Femke Kok
11	Jorien ter Mors	Dione Voskamp
12	Jutta Leerdam	Isabelle van Elst

=== Draw 2nd 500m ===
Heat	Inner lane	Outer lane
1	Pien Hersma	Sanneke de Neeling
2	Danouk Bannink	Sacha van der Weide
3	Pien Smit	Anna Boersma
4	Jildou Hoekstra	Myrthe de Boer
5	Maud Lugters	Femke Beuling
6	Marit van Beijnum	Lotte van Beek
7	Isabelle van Elst	Jorien ter Mors
8	Letitia de Jong	Naomi Verkerk
9	Isabel Grevelt	Helga Drost
10	Esmé Stollenga	Marrit Fledderus
11	Dione Voskamp	Michelle de Jong
12	Femke Kok	Jutta Leerdam

Referee: Berri de Jonge. Assistant: Suzan van den Belt. Starter: Janny Smegen
Start: 14:10.00 hr. Finish: 14:32.37
