= 2023 KNSB Dutch Single Distance Championships – Women's 500 m =

Dutch speed skating competition

- Venue: Thialf, Heerenveen, Netherlands
- Date: 4 February 2023
- Competitors: 20 skaters

Medalist men
1st place, gold medalist(s)		Femke Kok	NED
2nd place, silver medalist(s)		Jutta Leerdam	NED
3rd place, bronze medalist(s)		Michelle de Jong	NED

The women's 500 meter at the 2023 KNSB Dutch Single Distance Championships took place in Heerenveen at the Thialf ice skating rink on Saturday 4 February 2023. There were 20 participants who raced twice over 500m so that all skaters had to start once in the inner lane and once in the outer lane. Femke Kok, Jutta Leerdam, and Michelle de Jong qualified for the 2023 ISU World Speed Skating Championships in Heerenveen.

== Statistics ==
=== Result ===
Rank	Skater	Time 1st 500m	Time 2nd 500m	Samalog
1st place, gold medalist(s)	Femke Kok	37.48 (1)	37.64 (2)	75.12
2nd place, silver medalist(s)	Jutta Leerdam	37.80 (3)	37.53 (1)	75.33
3rd place, bronze medalist(s)	Michelle de Jong	37.65 (2)	37.74 (3)	75.39 PR
4	Marrit Fledderus	37.84 (4)	37.89 (4)	75.73
5	Naomi Verkerk	38.00 (5) PR	38.09 (6)	76.09 PR
6	Isabel Grevelt	38.17 (6)	38.17 (8)	76.34 PR
7	Helga Drost	38.33 (8)	38.15 (7)	76.48
8	Dione Voskamp	38.56 (12)	38.03 (5)	76.59
9	Esmé Stollenga	38.31 (7)	38.40 (9)	76.71
10	Maud Lugters	38.35 (9) PR	38.72 (13)	77.07 PR
11	Sanneke de Neeling	38.49 (10)	38.64 (10)	77.13
12	Marit van Beijnum	38.51 (11)	38.68 (11)	77.19
13	Anna Boersma	38.82 (14) PR	38.70 (12) PR	77.52 PR
14	Jildou Hoekstra	38.70 (13)	39.12 (15)	77.82
15	Ramona Westerhuis	38.88 (15)	39.09 (14)	77.97
16	Amber Duizendstraal	39.27 (17)	39.59 (16)	78.86
17	Sacha van der Weide	39.32 (18)	39.63 (17)	78.95
18	Lotte Groenen	39.49 (19) PR	39.71 (18)	79.20 PR
19	Anne Plat	40.38 (20)	40.55 (19)	80.93
NC	Sylka Kas	39.09 (16)	DNF	

=== Draw 1st 500m ===
Heat	Outer lane	Inner lane
1	Anne Plat	Lotte Groenen
2	Sylka Kas	Anna Boersma
3	Sacha van der Weide	Maud Lugters
4	Amber Duizendstraal	Jildou Hoekstra
5	Naomi Verkerk	Helga Drost
6	Marit van Beijnum	Ramona Westerhuis
7	Esmé Stollenga	Sanneke de Neeling
8	Femke Kok	Marrit Fledderus
9	Jutta Leerdam	Michelle de Jong
10	Dione Voskamp	Isabel Grevelt

=== Draw 2nd 500m ===
Heat	Outer lane	Inner lane
1	Lotte Groenen	Anne Plat
2	Ramona Westerhuis	Sacha van der Weide
3	Anna Boersma	Amber Duizendstraal
4	Jildou Hoekstra	Sylka Kas
5	Sanneke de Neeling	Dione Voskamp
6	Maud Lugters	Marit van Beijnum
7	Helga Drost	Esmé Stollenga
8	Isabel Grevelt	Naomi Verkerk
9	Marrit Fledderus	Jutta Leerdam
10	Michelle de Jong	Femke Kok

Referee: Loretta Staring. Assistant: Miriam Kuiper. Starter: Marco Hesselink
