= 2023 KNSB Dutch Single Distance Championships – Women's 1000 m =

Dutch speed skating competition

- Venue: Thialf, Heerenveen
- Dates: 5 February 2023
- Competitors: 20 skaters

Medalist women
1st place, gold medalist(s)		Jutta Leerdam	NED
2nd place, silver medalist(s)		Antoinette Rijpma-de Jong	NED
3rd place, bronze medalist(s)		Michelle de Jong	NED

The women's 1000 meter at the 2023 KNSB Dutch Single Distance Championships in Heerenveen took place at Thialf ice skating rink on Sunday 5 February 2023. There were 20 participants. Jutta Leerdam, Antoinette Rijpma-de Jong, and Michelle de Jong qualified for the 2023 ISU World Speed Skating Championships in Heerenveen.

== Statistics ==
=== Result ===
Rank	Skater	Time
1st place, gold medalist(s)	Jutta Leerdam	1:13.58
2nd place, silver medalist(s)	Antoinette Rijpma-de Jong	1:14.85
3rd place, bronze medalist(s)	Michelle de Jong	1:14.96
4	Femke Kok	1:15.03
5	Marrit Fledderus	1:15.86
6	Naomi Verkerk	1:16.00
7	Sanneke de Neeling	1:16.30
8	Helga Drost	1:16.30
9	Esmé Stollenga	1:16.77
10	Myrthe de Boer	1:16.81
11	Isabel Grevelt	1:16.83
12	Elisa Dul	1:16.87
13	Maud Lugters	1:17.21
14	Reina Anema	1:17.45
15	Dione Voskamp	1:17.86
16	Anne Boersma	1:18.06
17	Sylke Kas	1:18.29
18	Meike Veen	1:18.31 PR
19	Aveline Hijlkema	1:19.85
20	Ju-lin de Visser	1:20.27 PR
21	Marit van Beijnum	WDR

Referee: Loretta Staring. Assistant: Miriam Kuiper. Starter: Marco Hesselink

=== Draw ===
Heat	Outer lane	Inner lane
1	Ju-lin de Visser	Aveline Hijlkema
2	Maud Lugters	Meike Veen
3	Reina Anema	Anne Boersma
4	Dione Voskamp	Sylke Kas
5	Esmé Stollenga	Sanneke de Neeling
6	Elisa Dul	Myrthe de Boer
7	Helga Drost	Naomi Verkerk
8	Antoinette Rijpma-de Jong	Michelle de Jong
9	Isabel Grevelt	Jutta Leerdam
10	Femke Kok	Marrit Fledderus
