= 2020 KNSB Dutch Single Distance Championships – Women's 500 m =

Dutch speed skating competition

- Venue: Thialf, Heerenveen
- Dates: 28 December 2019
- Competitors: 20 skaters

Medalist women
1st place, gold medalist(s)		Jutta Leerdam	NED
2nd place, silver medalist(s)		Letitia de Jong	NED
3rd place, bronze medalist(s)		Femke Kok	NED

The women's 500 meter at the 2020 KNSB Dutch Single Distance Championships in Heerenveen took place at Thialf ice skating rink on Saturday 28 December 2019.

== Statistics ==
=== Result ===
Position	Skater	Time
1st place, gold medalist(s)	Jutta Leerdam	37.75 PR
2nd place, silver medalist(s)	Letitia de Jong	37.93
3rd place, bronze medalist(s)	Femke Kok	38.14 PR
4	Femke Beuling	38.23 PR
5	Sanneke de Neeling	38.36
6	Jorien ter Mors	38.46
7	Michelle de Jong	38.63
8	Anice Das	38.642
9	Helga Drost	38.649
10	Janine Smit	38.66
11	Dione Voskamp	38.67
12	Isabelle van Elst	38.98
13	Marrit Fledderus	39.17
14	Naomi Verkerk	39.20 PR
15	Moniek Klijnstra	39.34
16	Manouk van Tol	39.37
17	Bo van der Werff	39.50
18	Maud Lugters	39.57
19	Isabel Grevelt	39.94
20	Danouk Bannink	40.12

Referee: Frank Zwitser Assistant: Suzan van den Belt
Starter: André de Vries
Start: 15:25 hr. Finish: 15:44 hr.

=== Draw ===
Heat	Inner lane	Outer lane
1	Danouk Bannink	Maud Lugters
2	Bo van der Werff	Naomi Verkerk
3	Marrit Fledderus	Isabel Grevelt
4	Anice Das	Moniek Klijnstra
5	Dione Voskamp	Isabelle van Elst
6	Helga Drost	Femke Beuling
7	Jutta Leerdam	Manouk van Tol
8	Sanneke de Neeling	Femke Kok
9	Jorien ter Mors	Janine Smit
10	Michelle de Jong	Letitia de Jong
