= 2021 KNSB Dutch Sprint Championships =

Sport season from dutch

- Venue: Thialf, Heerenveen
- Dates: 28–29 November 2020
- Competitors: 20 men 20 women

Medalist men
| 1st place, gold medalist(s) | | Hein Otterspeer | NED |
| 2nd place, silver medalist(s) | | Kai Verbij | NED |
| 3rd place, bronze medalist(s) | | Dai Dai N'tab | NED |

Medalist women
| 1st place, gold medalist(s) | | Jutta Leerdam | NED |
| 2nd place, silver medalist(s) | | Femke Kok | NED |
| 3rd place, bronze medalist(s) | | Suzanne Schulting | NED |

The 2021 KNSB Dutch Sprint Championships in speed skating were held in Heerenveen at the Thialf ice skating rink from 28 November to 29 November 2020. The tournament was part of the 2020–2021 speed skating season. Hein Otterspeer and Jutta Leerdam won the sprint titles. The sprint championships were held a week after the 2021 KNSB Dutch Allround Championships.

== Schedule ==
| Saturday 28 November 2020 | Sunday 29 November 2020 |
|---|---|
| 500 meter women sprint 1st run 500 meter men sprint 1st run 1000 meter women sprint 1st run 1000 meter men sprint 1st run | 500 meter women sprint 2nd run 500 meter men sprint 2nd run 1000 meter women sprint 2nd run 1000 meter men sprint 2nd run |

== Medalists ==
| Event | Gold | | Silver | | Bronze | |
|---|---|---|---|---|---|---|
| Women's Sprint overall | Jutta Leerdam | 149.365 | Femke Kok | 149.910 | Suzanne Schulting | 152.250 |
| Men's Sprint overall | Hein Otterspeer | 138.115 | Kai Verbij | 138.780 | Dai Dai N'tab | 138.920 |

=== Men's sprint podia ===
| Event | Winner | Runner-up | Third place |
|---|---|---|---|
| 1st 500m | Dai Dai N'tab | Hein Otterspeer | Ronald Mulder |
| 1st 1000m | Hein Otterspeer | Thomas Krol | Kjeld Nuis |
| 2nd 500m | Ronald Mulder | Dai Dai N'tab | Hein Otterspeer |
| 2nd 1000m | Thomas Krol | Kai Verbij | Hein Otterspeer |

=== Women's sprint podia ===
| Event | Winner | Runner-up | Third place |
|---|---|---|---|
| 1st 500m | Femke Kok | Jutta Leerdam | Michelle de Jong |
| 1st 1000m | Femke Kok | Jutta Leerdam | Suzanne Schulting |
| 2nd 500m | Femke Kok | Jutta Leerdam | Michelle de Jong |
| 2nd 1000m | Jutta Leerdam | Femke Kok | Ireen Wüst |

== Classification ==
=== Men's sprint ===
| Rank | Skater | 500m | 1000m | 500m | 1000m | Total points Samalog |
|---|---|---|---|---|---|---|
| 1st place, gold medalist(s) | Hein Otterspeer | 34.82 (2) | 1:07.99 (1) | 34.91 (3) | 1:08.78 (3) | 138.115 |
| 2nd place, silver medalist(s) | Kai Verbij | 34.90 (4) | 1:09.10 (4) | 35.02 (4) | 1:08.62 (2) | 138.780 |
| 3rd place, bronze medalist(s) | Dai Dai N'tab | 34.79 (1) | 1:09.28 (6) | 34.85 (2) | 1:09.28 (6) | 138.920 |
| 4 | Thomas Krol | 35.27 (7) | 1:08.19 (2) | 36.28 (18) | 1:08.34 (1) | 139.815 |
| 5 | Tijmen Snel | 35.22 (6) | 1:10.21 (10) | 35.37 (5) | 1:09.06 (4) | 140.225 |
| 6 | Merijn Scheperkamp | 35.31 (8) | 1:09.53 (7) | 35.45 (7) | 1:10.15 (11) | 140.600 |
| 7 | Wesly Dijs | 35.71 (13) | 1:09.19 (5) | 35.76 (14) | 1:09.20 (5) | 140.665 |
| 8 | Serge Yoro | 35.56 (12) | 1:09.71 (8) | 35.52 (9) | 1:09.89 (8) | 140.880 |
| 9 | Louis Hollaar | 35.76 (15) | 1:10.10 (9) | 35.91 (15) | 1:10.10 (10) | 141.770 |
| 10 | Gijs Esders | 36.01 (17) | 1:11.20 (15) | 35.69 (12) | 1:09.88 (7) | 142.240 |
| 11 | Jesper Hospes | 35.32 (9) | 1:11.44 (17) | 35.38 (6) | 1:11.80 (15) | 142.320 |
| 12 | Stefan Westenbroek | 35.40 (10) | 1:11.65 (18) | 35.58 (11) | 1:11.13 (13) | 142.370 |
| 13 | Joost van Dobbenburgh | 36.08 (18) | 1:11.26 (16) | 35.99 (17) | 1:10.04 (9) | 142.720 |
| 14 | Mika van Essen | 35.87 (16) | 1:10.79 (12) | 36.40 (20) | 1:10.51 (12) | 142.920 |
| 15 | Thomas Geerdinck | 35.74 (14) | 1:11.03 (14) | 35.98 (16) | 1:11.43 (14) | 142.950 |
| 16 | Thijs Govers | 36.27 (19) | 1:12.15 (19) | 36.35 (19) | 1:12.90 (16) | 145.145 |
| NC | Ronald Mulder | 34.86 (3) | 1:10.49 (11) | 34.80 (1) | | 104.905 |
| NC | Janno Botman | 35.50 (11) | 1:10.82 (13) | 35.70 (13) | | 106.610 |
| DQ | Kjeld Nuis | DQ | 1:08.61 (3) | 35.45 (7) | | 69.755 |
| DQ | Lennart Velema | 35.15 (5) | DQ | 35.56 (10) | | 70.710 |

=== Women's sprint ===
| Rank | Skater | 500m | 1000m | 500m | 1000m | Total points Samalog |
|---|---|---|---|---|---|---|
| 1st place, gold medalist(s) | Jutta Leerdam | 37.53 (2) | 1:14.34 (2) | 37.60 (2) | 1:14.13 (1) | 149.365 |
| 2nd place, silver medalist(s) | Femke Kok | 37.51 (1) | 1:14.23 (1) | 37.52 (1) | 1:15.53 (2) | 149.910 |
| 3rd place, bronze medalist(s) | Suzanne Schulting | 38.57 (5) | 1:14.89 (3) | 38.35 (4) | 1:15.77 (4) | 152.250 |
| 4 | Michelle de Jong | 38.04 (3) | 1:16.53 (8) | 38.19 (3) | 1:17.22 (10) | 153.105 |
| 5 | Marrit Fledderus | 38.27 (4) | 1:16.02 (6) | 38.48 (5) | 1:16.71 (6) | 153.115 |
| 6 | Ireen Wüst | 39.10 (12) | 1:15.88 (4) | 38.86 (10) | 1:15.56 (3) | 153.680 |
| 7 | Isabelle van Elst | 38.60 (6) | 1:16.41 (7) | 38.67 (8) | 1:17.11 (7) | 154.030 |
| 8 | Dione Voskamp | 38.77 (10) | 1:17.38 (13) | 38.54 (6) | 1:17.37 (12) | 154.685 |
| 9 | Janine Smit | 38.89 (11) | 1:17.33 (12) | 38.62 (7) | 1:17.38 (13) | 154.865 |
| 10 | Helga Drost | 38.68 (9) | 1:17.17 (10) | 38.68 (9) | 1:17.90 (15) | 154.895 |
| 11 | Melissa Wijfje | 39.50 (16) | 1:15.91 (5) | 39.53 (17) | 1:15.83 (5) | 154.900 |
| 12 | Esmé Stollenga | 38.66 (7) | 1:17.14 (9) | 39.20 (13) | 1:17.68 (14) | 155.270 |
| 13 | Marijke Groenewoud | 39.12 (13) | 1:17.68 (16) | 39.13 (12) | 1:17.20 (8) | 155.690 |
| 14 | Sanneke de Neeling | 39.32 (15) | 1:17.65 (15) | 39.48 (15) | 1:17.23 (11) | 156.240 |
| 15 | Lotte van Beek | 39.68 (18) | 1:17.24 (11) | 39.50 (16) | 1:17.21 (9) | 156.405 |
| 16 | Maud Lugters | 38.67 (8) | 1:18.67 (18) | 39.11 (11) | 1:19.90 (17) | 157.065 |
| 17 | Naomi Verkerk | 39.64 (17) | 1:20.37 (19) | 39.42 (14) | 1:19.65 (16) | 159.070 |
| 18 | Isabel Grevelt | 40.04 (20) | 1:20.65 (20) | 39.53 (17) | 1:20.42 (18) | 160.105 |
| NS | Elisa Dul | 39.30 (14) | 1:17.52 (14) | | | 78.060 |
| NS | Letitia de Jong | 39.75 (19) | 1:18.46 (17) | | | 78.980 |
