= 2021 KNSB Dutch Single Distance Championships – Women's 500 m =

- Venue: Thialf, Heerenveen, Netherlands
- Date: 31 October 2020
- Competitors: 24 skaters

Medalist men
1st place, gold medalist(s)		Femke Kok	NED
2nd place, silver medalist(s)		Jutta Leerdam	NED
3rd place, bronze medalist(s)		Marrit Fledderus	NED

The women's 500 meter at the 2021 KNSB Dutch Single Distance Championships took place in Heerenveen at the Thialf ice skating rink on Saturday 31 October 2020. Although this edition was held in 2020, it was part of the 2020–2021 speed skating season.

There were 24 participants who raced twice over 500m so that all skaters had to start once in the inner lane and once in the outer lane. There was a qualification selection incentive for the next following 2020–21 ISU Speed Skating World Cup tournaments.

Title holder was Jutta Leerdam.

== Overview ==
=== Result ===
Rank	Skater	Time 1st 500m	Time 2nd 500m	Points behind winner	Points Samalog
1st place, gold medalist(s)	Femke Kok	37.882	37.880		75.762
2nd place, silver medalist(s)	Jutta Leerdam	38.187	38.019	0.444	76.206
3rd place, bronze medalist(s)	Marrit Fledderus	38.391	38.280	0.909	76.671
4	Jorien ter Mors	38.643	38.332	1.213	76.975
5	Dione Voskamp	38.791	38.925	1.954	77.716
6	Isabelle van Elst	38.888	38.836	1.962	77.724
7	Esmé Stollenga	38.990	38.954	2.182	77.944
8	Janine Smit	39.144	38.823	2.205	77.967
9	Femke Beuling	39.109	38.910	2.257	78.019
10	Helga Drost	39.051	38.986	2.275	78.037
11	Marijke Groenewoud	39.088	39.239	2.565	78.327
12	Maud Lugters	39.385	39.249	2.872	78.634
13	Marit van Beijnum	39.353	39.287	2.878	78.640
14	Elisa Dul	39.341	39.421	3.000	78.762
15	Naomi Verkerk	39.600	39.609	3.447	79.209
16	Sanneke de Neeling	39.673	39.923	3.834	79.596
17	Isabel Grevelt	40.022	39.888	4.148	79.910
18	Naomi Weeland	40.670	40.319	5.227	80.989

=== Draw 1st 500m ===
Heat	Inner lane	Outer lane
1	Maud Lugters	Isabel Grevelt
2	Naomi Verkerk	Naomi Weeland
3	Marijke Groenewoud	Marit van Beijnum
4	Isabelle van Elst	Elisa Dul
5	Dione Voskamp	Marrit Fledderus
6	Helga Drost	Esmé Stollenga
7	Femke Beuling	Sanneke de Neeling
8	Jorien ter Mors	Femke Kok
9	Janine Smit	Jutta Leerdam

=== Draw 2nd 500m ===
Heat	Inner lane	Outer lane
1	Naomi Weeland	Naomi Verkerk
2	Isabel Grevelt	Maud Lugters
3	Sanneke de Neeling	Janine Smit
4	Marit van Beijnum	Femke Beuling
5	Elisa Dul	Marijke Groenewoud
6	Esmé Stollenga	Helga Drost
7	Marrit Fledderus	Isabelle van Elst
8	Jutta Leerdam	Dione Voskamp
9	Femke Kok	Jorien ter Mors

Referee: Wycher Bos. Assistant: Björn Fetlaar
Starter: Janny Smegen
