= List of world junior records in speed skating =

This list of world junior speed skating records is an overview of the current junior speed skating records in its various events ratified by the International Skating Union. Juniors are those who haven't become 19 years at the start of the season, 1 July.

== Men ==
Event	Record	Athlete	Nationality	Date	Meet	Place	Ref
500 meters	34.08	Jordan Stolz	United States	17 December 2022	World Cup	Calgary, Canada	
500 meters × 2	70.784	Kim Jun-ho	South Korea	15 February 2015	World Single Distance Championships	Heerenveen, Netherlands	
1000 meters	1:06.47	Jordan Stolz	United States	22 October 2022	World Cup Qualifiers	Salt Lake City, United States	
1500 meters	1:41.33	Finn Sonnekalb	Germany	15 November 2025	World Cup	Salt Lake City, United States	
3000 meters	3:40.03	Thijs Wiersma	Netherlands	21 February 2026	Junior World Cup	Inzell, Germany	
3000 meters	3:38.80	Metoděj Jílek	Czech Republic	18 January 2025	Time Trials	Calgary, Canada	
5000 meters	6:08.36	Liu Hanbin	China	21 November 2025	World Cup	Calgary, Canada	
Team sprint (3 laps)	1:20.46	Park Seong-hyeon; Chung Jae-woong; Kim Min-seok	South Korea	10 March 2018	World Junior Championships	Salt Lake City, United States	
Team pursuit (8 laps)	3:43.04	Taiga Sasaki; Taiki Shingai; Yuta Fuchigami	Japan	1 March 2026	World Junior Championships	Inzell, Germany	
Sprint combination	138.185 pts	Koo Kyung-min	South Korea	7–8 March 2024	World Sprint Championships	Inzell, Germany	
Junior combination	141.072 pts	Jordan Stolz	United States	5–7 January 2023	US Long Track Championships	Milwaukee, United States	
Small combination	148.070 pts	Berden de Vries	Netherlands	12–14 March 2008	Olympic Oval Final	Calgary, Canada	

== Women ==
Event	Record	Athlete	Nationality	Date	Meet	Place	Ref
500 meters	37.28	Angel Daleman	Netherlands	23 November 2025	World Cup	Calgary, Canada	
500 meters × 2	75.15	Angel Daleman	Netherlands	15 February 2025	Dutch Single Distances Championships	Heerenveen, Netherlands	
1000 meters	1:14.21	Joy Beune	Netherlands	10 March 2018	World Junior Championships	Salt Lake City, United States	
1500 meters	1:52.38	Angel Daleman	Netherlands	25 January 2025	World Cup	Calgary, Canada	
3000 meters	3:58.42	Jeannine Rosner	Austria	21 November 2025	World Cup	Calgary, Canada	
Team sprint (3 laps)	1:28.40	Femke Beuling; Jutta Leerdam; Joy Beune	Netherlands	25 November 2017	World Junior Cup	Inzell, Germany	
Team pursuit (6 laps)	2:59.55	Joy Beune; Elisa Dul; Jutta Leerdam	Netherlands	11 March 2018	World Junior Championships	Salt Lake City, United States	
Sprint combination	151.995 pts	Femke Kok	Netherlands	25–26 January 2020	Dutch Sprint Championships	Heerenveen, Netherlands	
Mini combination	153.776 pts WR	Joy Beune	Netherlands	9–10 March 2018	World Junior Championships	Salt Lake City, United States	

== Mixed ==
Event	Record	Athlete	Nationality	Date	Meet	Place	Ref
Mixed relay	3:00.56	Liu Yunqi; Pan Baoshuo	China	1 March 2026	World Junior Championships	Inzell, Germany	
