= 2019 KNSB Dutch Single Distance Championships – Women's 500 m =

- Venue: Thialf, Heerenveen, Netherlands
- Date: 29 December 2018
- Competitors: 20 skaters

Medalist men
1st place, gold medalist(s)		Janine Smit	NED
2nd place, silver medalist(s)		Letitia de Jong	NED
3rd place, bronze medalist(s)		Jutta Leerdam	NED

The women's 500 meter at the 2019 KNSB Dutch Single Distance Championships took place in Heerenveen at the Thialf ice skating rink on Saturday 29 December 2018. Although this edition was held in 2018, it was part of the 2018–2019 speed skating season.

There were 20 participants. There was a qualification selection incentive for the next following 2018–19 ISU Speed Skating World Cup tournaments.

Title holder was Jorien ter Mors.

== Overview ==
=== Result ===
Rank	Skater	Time
1st place, gold medalist(s)	Janine Smit	38.22 PB
2nd place, silver medalist(s)	Letitia de Jong	38.31
3rd place, bronze medalist(s)	Jutta Leerdam	38.41
4	Sanneke de Neeling	38.48
5	Femke Kok	38.54 PB
6	Femke Beuling	38.56 PB
7	Isabelle van Elst	38.71 PB
8	Floor van den Brandt	38.74
9	Esmé Stollenga	38.77 PB
10	Anice Das	38.79
11	Dione Voskamp	38.83
12	Michelle de Jong	38.87
13	Lotte van Beek	39.03
14	Sanne van der Schaar	39.20
15	Suzanne Schulting	39.25
16	Maud Lugters	39.360 PB
17	Helga Drost	39.369
18	Lina Miedema	39.43 PB
19	Bo van der Werff	39.55
20	Naomi Verkerk	39.88 PB

=== Draw ===
Heat	Inner lane	Outer lane
1	Naomi Verkerk	Lina Miedema
2	Lotte van Beek	Helga Drost
3	Maud Lugters	Michelle de Jong
4	Femke Kok	Bo van der Werff
5	Isabelle van Elst	Floor van den Brandt
6	Sanne van der Schaar	Anice Das
7	Suzanne Schulting	Esmé Stollenga
8	Sanneke de Neeling	Janine Smit
9	Femke Beuling	Letitia de Jong
10	Jutta Leerdam	Dione Voskamp
