= 2019 KNSB Dutch Single Distance Championships – Women's 1000 m =

Dutch speed skater

- Venue: Thialf, Heerenveen
- Date: 30 December 2018
- Competitors: 24 skaters

Medalist men
1st place, gold medalist(s)		Ireen Wüst	NED
2nd place, silver medalist(s)		Antoinette de Jong	NED
3rd place, bronze medalist(s)		Jutta Leerdam	NED

The women's 1000 meter at the 2019 KNSB Dutch Single Distance Championships took place in Heerenveen at the Thialf ice skating rink on Sunday 30 December 2018. There were 24 participants.

== Result ==
Rank	Skater	Time
1st place, gold medalist(s)	Ireen Wüst	1:14.86
2nd place, silver medalist(s)	Antoinette de Jong	1:15.27 PR
3rd place, bronze medalist(s)	Jutta Leerdam	1:15.31
4	Sanneke de Neeling	1:15.42
5	Letitia de Jong	1:15.56
6	Lotte van Beek	1:15.62
7	Janine Smit	1:16.39 PR
8	Femke Kok	1:16.46 PR
9	Elisa Dul	1:16.59
10	Joy Beune	1:16.63
11	Sanne van der Schaar	1:16.95
12	Roxanne van Hemert	1:17.10
13	Suzanne Schulting	1:17.15
14	Isabelle van Elst	1:17.31
15	Helga Drost	1:17.32 PR
16	Femke Beuling	1:17.34
17	Tessa Boogaard	1:17.71 PR
18	Robin Groot	1:17.97 PR
19	Aveline Hijlkema	1:18.12 PR
20	Michelle de Jong	1:18.35
21	Bo van der Werff	1:18.87
22	Maud Lugters	1:18.91 PR
23	Leeyen Harteveld	1:18.93
24	Anouk Sanders	DQ
NC	Esme Stollenga	WDR
