= 2018 KNSB Dutch Single Distance Championships – Women's 500 m =

- Venue: Thialf, Heerenveen, Netherlands
- Date: 27 October 2017
- Competitors: 24 skaters

Medalist men
| 1st place, gold medalist(s) | | Jorien ter Mors | NED |
| 2nd place, silver medalist(s) | | Marrit Leenstra | NED |
| 3rd place, bronze medalist(s) | | Sanneke de Neeling | NED |

The women's 500 meter at the 2018 KNSB Dutch Single Distance Championships took place in Heerenveen at the Thialf ice skating rink on Friday 27 October 2017. Although this edition was held in 2017, it was part of the 2017–2018 speed skating season.

There were 24 participants. There was a qualification selection incentive for the next following 2017–18 ISU Speed Skating World Cup tournaments.

Title holder was Jorien ter Mors.

== Overview ==
=== Result ===
| Rank | Skater | Time |
|---|---|---|
| 1st place, gold medalist(s) | Jorien ter Mors | 38.51 |
| 2nd place, silver medalist(s) | Marrit Leenstra | 38.88 |
| 3rd place, bronze medalist(s) | Sanneke de Neeling | 39.27 |
| 4 | Letitia de Jong | 39.29 |
| 5 | Janine Smit | 39.38 |
| 6 | Floor van den Brandt | 39.41 |
| 7 | Femke Beuling | 39.43 PR |
| 8 | Helga Drost | 39.485 PR |
| 9 | Mayon Kuipers | 39.488 |
| 10 | Anice Das | 39.54 |
| 11 | Jutta Leerdam | 39.59 |
| 12 | Sanne van der Schaar | 39.60 PR |
| 13 | Naomi Weeland | 39.65 |
| 14 | Michelle de Jong | 39.82 |
| 15 | Joy Beune | 39.84 |
| 16 | Lotte van Beek | 39.89 |
| 17 | Isabelle van Elst | 39.99 |
| 18 | Roxanne van Hemert | 40.05 |
| 19 | Elisa Dul | 40.17 |
| 20 | Manouk van Tol | 40.26 |
| 21 | Danouk Bannink | 40.49 |
| 22 | Anouk Karel | 40.77 |
| 23 | Naomi Verkerk | 40.85 |
| 24 | Fabiënne Winkel | 40.97 |

=== Draw ===
| Heat | Inner lane | Outer lane |
|---|---|---|
| 1 | Anouk Karel | Elisa Dul |
| 2 | Naomi Verkerk | Helga Drost |
| 3 | Manouk van Tol | Fabiënne Winkel |
| 4 | Femke Beuling | Sanne van der Schaar |
| 5 | Jutta Leerdam | Naomi Weeland |
| 6 | Danouk Bannink | Lotte van Beek |
| 7 | Joy Beune | Letitia de Jong |
| 8 | Mayon Kuipers | Michelle de Jong |
| 9 | Roxanne van Hemert | Isabelle van Elst |
| 10 | Marrit Leenstra | Jorien ter Mors |
| 11 | Sanneke de Neeling | Floor van den Brandt |
| 12 | Janine Smit | Anice Das |
