= 2020 KNSB Dutch Single Distance Championships – Women's 1000 m =

Dutch speed skating competition

- Venue: Thialf, Heerenveen
- Dates: 29 December 2019
- Competitors: 20 skaters

Medalist women
| 1st place, gold medalist(s) | | Jutta Leerdam | NED |
| 2nd place, silver medalist(s) | | Letitia de Jong | NED |
| 3rd place, bronze medalist(s) | | Ireen Wüst | NED |

The women's 1000 meter at the 2020 KNSB Dutch Single Distance Championships in Heerenveen took place at Thialf ice skating rink on Sunday 29 December 2019.

== Statistics ==
=== Result ===
| Position | Skater | Time |
|---|---|---|
| 1st place, gold medalist(s) | Jutta Leerdam | 1:14.24 |
| 2nd place, silver medalist(s) | Letitia de Jong | 1:14.68 |
| 3rd place, bronze medalist(s) | Ireen Wüst | 1:15.64 |
| 4 | Elisa Dul | 1:15.72 |
| 5 | Sanneke de Neeling | 1:15.76 |
| 6 | Helga Drost | 1:15.84 PR |
| 7 | Femke Kok | 1:16.11 |
| 8 | Marijke Groenewoud | 1:16.40 PR |
| 9 | Antoinette de Jong | 1:16.41 |
| 10 | Joy Beune | 1:16.50 |
| 11 | Anice Das | 1:16.74 |
| 12 | Janine Smit | 1:16.76 |
| 13 | Femke Beuling | 1:16.84 |
| 14 | Isabelle van Elst | 1:17.04 |
| 15 | Manouk van Tol | 1:17.51 |
| 16 | Michelle de Jong | 1:17.59 |
| 17 | Esmé Stollenga | 1:17.98 |
| 18 | Dione Voskamp | 1:18.36 |
| 19 | Leeyen Harteveld | 1:20.56 |
| 20 | Jorien ter Mors | DQ |

=== Draw ===
| Heat | Inner lane | Outer lane |
|---|---|---|
| 1 | Janine Smit | Leeyen Harteveld |
| 2 | Esmé Stollenga | Joy Beune |
| 3 | Femke Beuling | Anice Das |
| 4 | Marijke Groenewoud | Dione Voskamp |
| 5 | Isabelle van Elst | Femke Kok |
| 6 | Elisa Dul | Manouk van Tol |
| 7 | Michelle de Jong | Helga Drost |
| 8 | Ireen Wüst | Jorien ter Mors |
| 9 | Antoinette de Jong | Jutta Leerdam |
| 10 | Letitia de Jong | Sanneke de Neeling |
