= 2019 KNSB Dutch Single Distance Championships – Women's 1500 m =

- Venue: Thialf, Heerenveen, Netherlands
- Date: 28 December 2018
- Competitors: 20 skaters

Medalist men
1st place, gold medalist(s)		Ireen Wüst	NED
2nd place, silver medalist(s)		Antoinette de Jong	NED
3rd place, bronze medalist(s)		Melissa Wijfje	NED

The women's 1500 meter at the 2019 KNSB Dutch Single Distance Championships took place in Heerenveen at the Thialf ice skating rink on Friday 28 December 2018. Although this tournament was held in 2018, it was part of the 2018–2019 speed skating season.

There were 20 participants.

Title holder was Jorien ter Mors.

== Result ==
Rank	Skater	Time
1st place, gold medalist(s)	Ireen Wüst	1:55.39
2nd place, silver medalist(s)	Antoinette de Jong	1:56.04
3rd place, bronze medalist(s)	Melissa Wijfje	1:56.70
4	Lotte van Beek	1:56.71
5	Joy Beune	1:56.99
6	Carlijn Achtereekte	1:57.39 PR
7	Sanneke de Neeling	1:57.76
8	Reina Anema	1:58.09 PR
9	Roxanne van Hemert	1:58.43
10	Sanne van der Schaar	1:58.69
11	Aveline Hijlkema	1:59.27 PR
12	Elisa Dul	1:59.40
13	Femke Kok	2:00.26 PR
14	Sanne in 't Hof	2:00.53
15	Paulien Verhaar	2:00.53 PR
16	Isabelle van Elst	2:02.08
17	Robin Groot	2:03.03
18	Muriël Meijer	2:03.17 PR
19	Marijke Groenewoud	2:03.96
20	Anouk Sanders	2:05.84 PR
