= 2021 KNSB Dutch Single Distance Championships – Women's 1000 m =

Dutch speed skating competition

- Venue: Thialf, Heerenveen
- Dates: 1 November 2020
- Competitors: 18 skaters

Medalist women
1st place, gold medalist(s)		Jutta Leerdam	NED
2nd place, silver medalist(s)		Femke Kok	NED
3rd place, bronze medalist(s)		Ireen Wüst	NED

The women's 1000 meter at the 2021 KNSB Dutch Single Distance Championships in Heerenveen took place at Thialf ice skating rink on Sunday 1 November 2020.

== Statistics ==
=== Result ===
Rank	Skater	Time
1st place, gold medalist(s)	Jutta Leerdam	1:13.86
2nd place, silver medalist(s)	Femke Kok	1:15.16 PR
3rd place, bronze medalist(s)	Ireen Wüst	1:15.40
4	Jorien ter Mors	1:15.44
5	Marijke Groenewoud	1:15.57 PR
6	Suzanne Schulting	1:15.76
7	Marrit Fledderus	1:15.99 PR
8	Isabelle van Elst	1:16.05
9	Antoinette de Jong	1:16.12
10	Elisa Dul	1:16.69(4)
11	Helga Drost	1:16.69(6)
12	Sanneke de Neeling	1:17.72
13	Femke Beuling	1:18.04
14	Dione Voskamp	1:18.08
15	Esmé Stollenga	1:18.09
16	Janine Smit	1:18.21
17	Lotte van Beek	1:18.45
18	Robin Groot	DQ

Referee: Wycher Bos. Assistant: Björn Fetlaar. Starter: Raymond Micka
Start 1-11-2020 16:02:00 until 1-11-2020 16:25:39

=== Draw ===
Heat	Inner lane	Outer lane
1	Esmé Stollenga	Lotte van Beek
2	Janine Smit	Robin Groot
3	Marrit Fledderus	Suzanne Schulting
4	Femke Kok	Femke Beuling
5	Isabelle van Elst	Marijke Groenewoud
6	Helga Drost	Dione Voskamp
7	Jutta Leerdam	Jorien ter Mors
8	Antoinette de Jong	Sanneke de Neeling
9	Ireen Wüst	Elisa Dul
