= 2018 KNSB Dutch Single Distance Championships – Women's 1000 m =

- Venue: Thialf, Heerenveen, Netherlands
- Date: 29 October 2017
- Competitors: 24 skaters

Medalist men
1st place, gold medalist(s)		Jorien ter Mors	NED
2nd place, silver medalist(s)		Marrit Leenstra	NED
3rd place, bronze medalist(s)		Ireen Wüst	NED

The women's 1000 meter at the 2018 KNSB Dutch Single Distance Championships took place in Heerenveen at the Thialf ice skating rink on Sunday 29 October 2017. There were 24 participants.

Title holder was Jorien ter Mors. This was her third 1000-meter national title.

== Result ==
Rank	Skater	Time
1st place, gold medalist(s)	Jorien ter Mors	1:15.94
2nd place, silver medalist(s)	Marrit Leenstra	1:16.18
3rd place, bronze medalist(s)	Ireen Wüst	1:16.50
4	Lotte van Beek	1:16.59
5	Sanneke de Neeling	1:16.80
6	Sanne van der Schaar	1:16.94
7	Joy Beune	1:16.97
8	Suzanne Schulting	1:17.02
9	Anice Das	1:17.48
10	Jutta Leerdam	1:17.69
11	Roxanne van Hemert	1:17.74
12	Manouk van Tol	1:17.75
13	Letitia de Jong	1:17.78
14	Janine Smit	1:18.19
15	Elisa Dul	1:18.28
16	Floor van den Brandt	1:18.34
17	Leeyen Harteveld	1:18.04
18	Femke Beuling	1:19.35
19	Helga Drost	1:19.68
20	Esther Kiel	1:19.77
21	Isabelle van Elst	1:19.84
22	Natasja Roest	1:20.39 PR
23	Danouk Bannink	1:21.62
24	Rachelle van de Griek	1:22.09
–	Marije Joling	WDR

WDR = Withdrew
