= 2021 KNSB Dutch Single Distance Championships – Women's 1500 m =

Dutch speed skating competition

- Venue: Thialf, Heerenveen
- Dates: 30 October 2020
- Competitors: 16 skaters

Medalist women
1st place, gold medalist(s)		Jorien ter Mors	NED
2nd place, silver medalist(s)		Antoinette de Jong	NED
3rd place, bronze medalist(s)		Melissa Wijfje	NED

The women's 1500 meter at the 2021 KNSB Dutch Single Distance Championships in Heerenveen took place at Thialf ice skating rink on Friday 30 October 2020.

== Statistics ==
=== Result ===
Rank	Skater	Time
1st place, gold medalist(s)	Jorien ter Mors	1:55.50
2nd place, silver medalist(s)	Antoinette de Jong	1:55.98
3rd place, bronze medalist(s)	Melissa Wijfje	1:56.66
4	Ireen Wüst	1:56.72
5	Marijke Groenewoud	1:57.52 PR
6	Irene Schouten	1:57.68
7	Reina Anema	1:58.29
8	Joy Beune	1:58.43
9	Elisa Dul	1:58.83
10	Aveline Hijlkema	1:59.53
11	Esther Kiel	1:59.74
12	Isabelle van Elst	1:59.79
13	Roza Blokker	1:59.83
14	Lotte van Beek	2:00.50
15	Sanne in 't Hof	2:01.40
6	Myrthe de Boer	2:02.07

Referee: Wycher Bos. Starter: Raymond Micka. Assistant: Björn Fetlaar
Start: 30-10-2020 13:50:00hr. Finish: 30-10-2020 14:13:17hr

=== Draw ===
Heat	Inner lane	Outer lane
1	Aveline Hijlkema	Esther Kiel
2	Myrthe de Boer	Sanne in 't Hof
3	Isabelle van Elst	Roza Blokker
4	Irene Schouten	Lotte van Beek
5	Marijke Groenewoud	Elisa Dul
6	Antoinette de Jong	Jorien ter Mors
7	Melissa Wijfje	Joy Beune
8	Ireen Wüst	Reina Anema
