= 2020 KNSB Dutch Single Distance Championships – Women's 1500 m =

Dutch speed skating competition

- Venue: Thialf, Heerenveen
- Dates: 27 December 2019
- Competitors: 20 skaters

Medalist women
1st place, gold medalist(s)		Melissa Wijfje	NED
2nd place, silver medalist(s)		Ireen Wüst	NED
3rd place, bronze medalist(s)		Joy Beune	NED

The women's 1500 meter at the 2020 KNSB Dutch Single Distance Championships in Heerenveen took place at Thialf ice skating rink on Friday 27 December 2019.

== Statistics ==
=== Result ===
Position	Skater	Time
1st place, gold medalist(s)	Melissa Wijfje	1:55.65
2nd place, silver medalist(s)	Ireen Wüst	1:55.69
3rd place, bronze medalist(s)	Joy Beune	1:55.87
4	Antoinette de Jong	1:56.16
5	Carlijn Achtereekte	1:56.60
6	Sanneke de Neeling	1:57.35
7	Reina Anema	1:57.43
8	Irene Schouten	1:57.51 PR
9	Elisa Dul	1:57.88
10	Jorien ter Mors	1:57.88
11	Esmee Visser	1:58.26
12	Isabelle van Elst	1:58.73
13	Lotte van Beek	1:59.07
14	Femke Kok	1:59.81
15	Gioya Lancee	1:59.94 PR
16	Roza Blokker	2:00.15
17	Aveline Hijlkema	2:00.40
18	Paulien Verhaar	2:01.32
19	Esther Kiel	2:01.77
20	Myrthe de Boer	2:02.97

=== Draw ===
Heat	Inner lane	Outer lane
1	Paulien Verhaar	Gioya Lancee
2	Myrthe de Boer	Esther Kiel
3	Aveline Hijlkema	Lotte van Beek
4	Esmee Visser	Roza Blokker
5	Femke Kok	Isabelle van Elst
6	Elisa Dul	Sanneke de Neeling
7	Irene Schouten	Joy Beune
8	Jorien ter Mors	Reina Anema
9	Melissa Wijfje	Carlijn Achtereekte
10	Antoinette de Jong	Ireen Wüst
