= 2018 World Junior Speed Skating Championships =

International speed skating competition

- Venue: Utah Olympic Oval, Salt Lake City, United States
- Dates: 9–11 March
- Competitors: 116 from 24 nations

Medalist men
1st place, gold medalist(s)		Allan Dahl Johansson	Norway
2nd place, silver medalist(s)		Tyson Langelaar	Canada
3rd place, bronze medalist(s)		Francesco Betti	Italy

Medalist women
1st place, gold medalist(s)		Joy Beune	Netherlands
2nd place, silver medalist(s)		Jutta Leerdam	Netherlands
3rd place, bronze medalist(s)		Elisa Dul	Netherlands

The 2018 World Junior Speed Skating Championships took place from 9 to 11 March 2018 in Utah Olympic Oval, Salt Lake City, United States. They were the 45th World Junior Speed Skating Championships.

== Medal summary ==
=== Medal table ===
* Host nation (United States)

Rank	Nation	Gold	Silver	Bronze	Total
1	Netherlands (NED)	6	5	4	15
2	South Korea (KOR)	4	1	4	9
3	Japan (JPN)	2	3	2	7
4	Canada (CAN)	2	2	0	4
4	Norway (NOR)	2	2	0	4
6	Poland (POL)	0	1	1	2
7	Germany (GER)	0	1	0	1
7	United States (USA)*	0	1	0	1
9	Russia (RUS)	0	0	3	3
10	Italy (ITA)	0	0	2	2
Totals (10 entries)		16	16	16	48

== Men's events ==
The results of the Championships:

Event	Gold		Silver		Bronze	
500 m	Chung Jae-woong (KOR)	34.66	Torai Ishikawa (JPN)	34.87	Koki Kubo (JPN)	35.00
1000 m	Koki Kubo (JPN)	1:07.76 WRJ	Allan Dahl Johansson (NOR)	1:08.02	Chung Jae-woong (KOR)	1:08.33
1500 m	Allan Dahl Johansson (NOR)	1:43.62	David La Rue (CAN)	1:44.59	Kim Min-seok (KOR)	1:45.11
5000 m	Chung Jae-won (KOR)	6:20.75	Allan Dahl Johansson (NOR)	6:26.90	Egor Shkolin (RUS)	6:27.17
Mass start	David La Rue (CAN)	30 pts	Ethan Cepuran (USA)	20 pts	Kim Min-seok (KOR)	10 pts
Team Pursuit	South Korea; Lee Do-hyung; Kim Min-seok; Chung Jae-won	3:43.55 WRJ	Japan; Riki Hayashi; Taishi Yamamoto; Kohki Takamisawa	3:44.68	Russia; Sergei Loginov; Egor Shkolin; Aleksandr Podolskii	3:44.73
Team Sprint	South Korea; Park Seong-hyeon; Chung Jae-woong; Kim Min-seok	1:20.46 WRJ	Germany; Ole Jeske; Paul Galczinsky; Max Reder	1:20.76	Russia; Sergei Loginov; Ruslan Zakharov; Aleksandr Podolskii	1:20.94
Overall Classification	Allan Dahl Johansson (NOR)	143.060 WRJ	Tyson Langelaar (CAN)	145.061	Francesco Betti (ITA)	145.577

== Women's events ==
The results of the Championships:

Event	Gold		Silver		Bronze	
500 m	Kurumi Inagawa (JPN)	38.22	Jutta Leerdam (NED)	38.26	Michelle de Jong (NED)	38.48
1000 m	Joy Beune (NED)	1:14.21 WRJ	Jutta Leerdam (NED)	1:14.38	Elisa Dul (NED)	1:15.31
1500 m	Joy Beune (NED)	1:54.21 WRJ	Jutta Leerdam (NED)	1:54.31	Elisa Dul (NED)	1:56.83
3000 m	Joy Beune (NED)	3:59.47 WRJ	Jutta Leerdam (NED)	4:05.19	Lemi Williamson (JPN)	4:05.96
Mass start	Béatrice Lamarche (CAN)	30 pts	Karolina Bosiek (POL)	20 pts	Laura Peveri (ITA)	10 pts
Team Pursuit	Netherlands; Joy Beune; Elisa Dul; Jutta Leerdam	2:59.55 WRJ	Japan; Karuna Koyama; Lemi Williamson; Yui Fujimori	3:02.68	South Korea; Park Chae-eun; Yoon Jung-min; Park Ji-woo	3:05.06
Team Sprint	Netherlands; Michelle de Jong; Femke Beuling; Jutta Leerdam	1:28.75	South Korea; Kim Min-jo; Park Chae-eun; Park Ji-woo	1:29.05	Poland; Natalia Jabrzyk; Karolina Gąsecka; Karolina Bosiek	1:29.46
Overall Classification	Joy Beune (NED)	153.776 WR	Jutta Leerdam (NED)	154.418	Elisa Dul (NED)	157.306
