= 2020 KNSB Dutch Sprint Championships =

Dutch speed skating competition

KNSB Dutch Sprint Championships
- Competitors: 20 men 20women

Medalist men
1st place, gold medalist(s)		Kjeld Nuis	NED
2nd place, silver medalist(s)		Lennart Velema	NED
3rd place, bronze medalist(s)		Gijs Esders	NED

Medalist women
1st place, gold medalist(s)		Letitia de Jong	NED
2nd place, silver medalist(s)		Jorien ter Mors	NED
3rd place, bronze medalist(s)		Femke Kok	NED

The 2020 KNSB Dutch Sprint Championships in speed skating were held in Heerenveen at the Thialf ice skating rink from 25 January to 26 January 2020. The tournament was part of the 2019–2020 speed skating season. Kjeld Nuis and Letitia de Jong won the sprint titles. The sprint championships were held at the same time as the 2020 KNSB Dutch Allround Championships.

== Schedule ==
Saturday 25 January 2020	Sunday 26 January 2020
500 meter women sprint 1st run 500 meter men sprint 1st run 1000 meter women sprint 1st run 1000 meter men sprint 1st run	500 meter women sprint 2nd run 500 meter men sprint 2nd run 1000 meter women sprint 2nd run 1000 meter men sprint 2nd run

== Medalist ==
Event	Gold		Silver		Bronze	
Women's Sprint overall	Letitia de Jong	150.495	Jorien ter Mors	151.820	Femke Kok	151.995
Men's Sprint overall	Kjeld Nuis	139.685	Lennart Velema	139.735	Gijs Esders	139.995

=== Men's sprint ===
Event	1st place, gold medalist(s)	2nd place, silver medalist(s)	3rd place, bronze medalist(s)	
Classification	Kjeld Nuis	Lennart Velema	Gijs Esders	data
500 meter (1st)	Ronald Mulder	Gijs Esders	Jesper Hospes	data
1000 meter (1st)	Kjeld Nuis	Ronald Mulder	Lennart Velema	data
500 meter (2nd)	Gijs Esders	Hein Otterspeer	Lennart Velema	data
1000 meter (2nd)	Kjeld Nuis	Lennart Velema	Gijs Esders	data

=== Women's sprint ===
Event	1st place, gold medalist(s)	2nd place, silver medalist(s)	3rd place, bronze medalist(s)	
Classification	Letitia de Jong	Jorien ter Mors	Femke Kok	data
500 meter (1st)	Letitia de Jong	Femke Kok	Sanneke de Neeling; Janine Smit	data
1000 meter (1st)	Letitia de Jong	Jorien ter Mors	Ireen Wüst	data
500 meter (2nd)	Femke Kok	Letitia de Jong	Jorien ter Mors	data
1000 meter (2nd)	Letitia de Jong	Jorien ter Mors	Femke Kok	data

== Classification ==
=== Men's sprint ===
Position	Skater	Total points Samalog	500m	1000m	500m	1000m
1st place, gold medalist(s)	Kjeld Nuis	139.685	35.47 (6)	1:08.88 (1)	35.46 (6)	1:08.63 (1)
2nd place, silver medalist(s)	Lennart Velema	139.735	35.36 (4)	1:09.44 (3)	35.16 (3)	1:08.99 (2)
3rd place, bronze medalist(s)	Gijs Esders	139.905	35.22 (2)	1:10.01 (5)	35.12 (1)	1:09.12 (3)
4	Jesper Hospes	141.025	35.29 (3)	1:10.52 (7)	35.22 (4)	1:10.51 (8)
5	Tijmen Snel	141.190 PR	35.88 (10)	1:09.84 (4)	35.39 (5)	1:10.00 (4)
6	Janno Botman	141.995 PR	35.68 (7)	1:10.93 (10)	35.71 (7)	1:10.28 (6)
6	Merijn Scheperkamp	141.995 PR	35.74 (9)	1:10.41 (6)	35.80 (10)	1:10.50 (7)
8	Serge Yoro	142.180 PR	35.92 (11)	1:10.85 (9)	35.71 (7) PR	1:10.25 (5) PR
9	Thijs Govers	143.100	36.07 (13)	1:11.26 (12)	35.77 (9)	1:11.26 (11)
10	Joost van Dobbenburgh	143.235	36.15 (14)	1:11.27 (13)	36.19 (13)	1:10.52 (9)
11	Elwin Jongman	143.325 PR	36.17 (16) PR	1:11.30 (14) PR	35.83 (11) PR	1:11.35 (12)
12	Kai in 't Veld	144.205 PR	36.74 (19) PR	1:11.16 (11) PR	36.44 (14) PR	1:10.89 (10) PR
13	Niek Deelstra	144.330	36.03 (12)	1:12.00 (16)	36.09 (12)	1:12.42 (13)
14	Joep Kalverdijk	146.425	36.70 (18)	1:11.96 (15)	37.08 (17)	1:13.33 (14)
NC	Stef Brandsen	109.855	36.24 (17)	1:14.09 (17)	36.57 (15)	WDR
NC	Rem de Hair	110.915	37.00 (20)	1:14.55 (18)	36.64 (16)	WDR
NC	Ronald Mulder	159.370	34.86 (1)	1:09.42 (2)	1:29.80 (18) *fall	DNS
NC	Tom Kant	71.540	36.16 (15)	1:10.76 (8)	DNF	
NC	Hein Otterspeer	70.570	35.42 (5)	DQ	35.15 (2)	
NC	Gerben Jorritsma	35.680	35.68 (7)	WDR		

=== Women's sprint ===
Position	Skater	Total points Samalog	500m	1000m	500m	1000m
1st place, gold medalist(s)	Letitia de Jong	150.495 PR	37.92 (1)	1:14.75 (1)	37.99 (2)	1:14.42 (1)
2nd place, silver medalist(s)	Jorien ter Mors	151.820	38.43 (6)	1:15.07 (2)	38.20 (3)	1:15.31 (2)
3rd place, bronze medalist(s)	Femke Kok	151.995 WR (jr)	38.13 (2)	1:16.21 (6)	37.94 (1)	1:15.64 (3) PR/TR (jr)
4	Sanneke de Neeling	152.725	38.29 (3)	1:15.67 (4)	38.61 (8)	1:15.98 (6)
5	Anice Das	152.990	38.57 (8)	1:16.09 (5)	38.48 (7)	1:15.79 (4)
6	Janine Smit	153.480	38.29 (3)	1:17.01 (9)	38.23 (4)	1:16.91 (10)
7	Dione Voskamp	153.875 PR	38.31 (5) PR	1:17.07 (10)	38.47 (6)	1:17.12 (12)
8	Elisa Dul	154.300 PR	39.13 (14)	1.16.56 (7)	38.95 (12)	1.15.88 (5)
9	Femke Beuling	154.405 PR	38.60 (9)	1:17.43 (11)	38.64 (9)	1:16.90 (9)
10	Helga Drost	154.580	38.81 (11)	1:17.64 (12)	38.73 (10)	1:16.44 (7)
11	Isabelle van Elst	154.790	38.65 (10)	1:16.92 (8)	39.25 (14)	1:16.86 (8)
12	Michelle de Jong	155.580 PR	38.91 (12)	1:19.77 (17)	38.29 (5)	1:16.99 (11)
13	Esmé Stollenga	156.100	39.04 (13)	1:18.48 (14)	39.91 (11)	1:17.82 (15)
14	Manouk van Tol	156.170	39.22 (15)	1:17.82 (13)	39.36 (15)	1:17.36 (13)
15	Tessa Boogaard	158.030	39.66 (17)	1:19.22 (15)	39.39 (16)	1:18.74 (15)
16	Naomi Verkerk	158.175 PR	39.33 (16)	1:20.21 (18)	39.14 (13) PR	1:19.20 (17) PR
17	Leeyen Harteveld	158.365 PR	39.83 (18)	1:19.51 (16)	40.03 (18)	1:17.50 (14) PR
18	Naomi Weeland	160.105 PR	39.97 (19)	1:20.92 (19)	39.58 (17)	1:20.19 (18) PR
19	Lianne van Loon	161.610 PR	40.17 (20)	1:21.19 (20)	40.08 (19)	1:21.53 (19)
NC	Ireen Wüst	76.125	38.46 (7)	1:15.33 (3)	WDR	
