= ISU Junior World Cup Speed Skating =

Annual long-track speed skating series

The ISU Junior World Cup Speed Skating is a series of international long-track speed skating matches, organised yearly by the International Skating Union. It is the second most important competition for juniors, behind the World Junior Speed Skating Championships. The format is comparable to the ISU Speed Skating World Cup, but only junior skaters (up until the season they turn 19) are allowed to enter. Starting in the 2016–17 season, a competition for "neo-seniors" was added.

The first edition was held in the 2008–09 season with competition in five distances for both men (boys) and ladies (girls). The 500, 1000, 1500 and team pursuit were run for both sexes and while the ladies had a competition over 3000 metres, the men had a competition over the combined 3000 and 5000 metres. In the 2011–12 season, the mass start event (12 laps for men, 8 laps for ladies) was added and in the 2013–14 season a team sprint event (3 laps) was held for the first time. The results for the team sprint and team pursuit events are combined in the final rankings. Since the 2014–15 season, the mass start is held over 10 laps for both men and ladies.

In November 2011, the ISU Junior World Cup Speed Skating was used as part of the qualification process for the speed skating at the 2012 Winter Youth Olympics.

== Overall winners ==
=== Junior ===
==== Men ====
Season	500 m	1000 m	1500 m	3000/5000 m	Mass start	Team pursuit	Team sprint	Mixed relay	Ref
2008–09	(Italy) Jan Daldossi	(Italy) Jan Daldossi	(Netherlands) Pim Cazemier	(Netherlands) Pim Cazemier	—N/a	Germany	—N/a	—N/a	
2009–10	(Kazakhstan) Aleksey Bondarchuk	(Kazakhstan) Aleksey Bondarchuk	(Norway) Kjetil Stiansen	(Netherlands) Frank Hermans	—N/a	Netherlands	—N/a	—N/a	
2010–11	(South Korea) Kim Seong-kyu	(Netherlands) Maurice Vriend	(Netherlands) Maurice Vriend	(Netherlands) Frank Hermans	—N/a	Netherlands	—N/a	—N/a	
2011–12	(South Korea) Kim Woo-jin	(South Korea) Kim Woo-jin	(Netherlands) Thomas Krol	(Netherlands) Thomas Krol	(Netherlands) Kai Verbij	South Korea	—N/a	—N/a	
2012–13	(Kazakhstan) Darsil Essamambo	(Netherlands) Kai Verbij	(China) Yang Fan	(Italy) Andrea Giovannini	(Netherlands) Gerben Jorritsma	Italy	—N/a	—N/a	
2013–14	(Netherlands) Dai Dai N'tab	(Netherlands) Arvin Wijsman	(Netherlands) Patrick Roest	(Netherlands) Patrick Roest	(Austria) Armin Hager	Netherlands		—N/a	
2014–15	(Russia) Mikhail Kazelin	(Netherlands) Wesly Dijs	(Netherlands) Patrick Roest	(Netherlands) Patrick Roest	(Netherlands) Patrick Roest	South Korea		—N/a	
2015–16	(Russia) Viktor Mushtakov	(Russia) Viktor Mushtakov	(Netherlands) Marcel Bosker	(Netherlands) Marcel Bosker	(Netherlands) Marcel Bosker	Netherlands		—N/a	
2016–17	(China) Yang Tao	(China) Jin Yanan	(South Korea) Oh Hyun-min	(Netherlands) Marwin Talsma	(South Korea) Oh Hyun-min	Norway		—N/a	
2017–18	(Russia) Ruslan Zakharov	(Russia) Ruslan Zakharov	(Italy) Francesco Betti	(Italy) Francesco Betti	(Austria) Gabriel Odor	Russia		—N/a	
2018–19	(Russia) Artem Arefyev	(Russia) Sergei Loginov	(Norway) Hallgeir Engebråten	(Norway) Hallgeir Engebråten	(Netherlands) Yves Vergeer	Russia		—N/a	
2019–20	(South Korea) Cho Sang-hyeok	(South Korea) Cho Sang-hyeok	(Norway) Peder Kongshaug	(Russia) Daniil Aldoshkin	(Japan) Tsubasa Horikawa	Japan		—N/a	
2020–21	Cancelled due to the COVID-19 pandemic								
2021–22	(Netherlands) Joep Wennemars	(Netherlands) Joep Wennemars	(Netherlands) Tim Prins	(Norway) Sigurd Henriksen	(South Korea) Yang Ho-jun	Netherlands			
2022–23	(South Korea) Koo Kyung-min	(Kazakhstan) Nikita Vazhenin	(Norway) Emil Pedersen Matre	(Netherlands) Stijn van de Bunt	(Sweden) Kaspar Norberg	Poland			
2023–24	(South Korea) Koo Kyung-min	(Japan) Issa Gunji	(Germany) Finn Sonnekalb	(Czech Republic) Metoděj Jílek	(Czech Republic) Metoděj Jílek	Netherlands			
2024–25	(South Korea) Cho Yeong-jun	(Germany) Finn Sonnekalb	(Germany) Finn Sonnekalb	(Netherlands) Mats Bendijk	(South Korea) Yoon Ji-ho	Netherlands			
2025–26	(South Korea) Shin Seon-ung	(South Korea) Han Man-hyeok	(South Korea) Kim Jun-ha	(Netherlands) Ede Kortlever	(South Korea) Whang Seo-joon	South Korea			

==== Women ====
Season	500 m	1000 m	1500 m	3000 m	Mass start	Team pursuit	Team sprint	Mixed relay	Ref
2008–09	(Russia) Olga Fatkulina	(Netherlands) Roxanne van Hemert	(Netherlands) Roxanne van Hemert	(Netherlands) Yvonne Nauta	—N/a	Netherlands	—N/a	—N/a	
2009–10	(Kazakhstan) Yekaterina Aydova	(Kazakhstan) Yekaterina Aydova	(Netherlands) Lotte van Beek	(Netherlands) Irene Schouten	—N/a	Netherlands	—N/a	—N/a	
2010–11	(Kazakhstan) Yekaterina Aydova	(Netherlands) Lotte van Beek	(Netherlands) Pien Keulstra	(Netherlands) Pien Keulstra	—N/a	Japan	—N/a	—N/a	
2011–12	(Netherlands) Letitia de Jong	(Netherlands) Antoinette de Jong	(Netherlands) Pien Keulstra	(South Korea) Park Do-yeong	(South Korea) Park Do-yeong	South Korea	—N/a	—N/a	
2012–13	(Austria) Vanessa Bittner	(Austria) Vanessa Bittner	(Netherlands) Reina Anema	(Netherlands) Jade van der Molen	(Austria) Vanessa Bittner	Netherlands	—N/a	—N/a	
2013–14	(Austria) Vanessa Bittner	(Netherlands) Melissa Wijfje	(Netherlands) Melissa Wijfje	(Netherlands) Melissa Wijfje	(Austria) Vanessa Bittner	Netherlands		—N/a	
2014–15	(Russia) Darya Kachanova	(Netherlands) Tessa Boogaard	(Netherlands) Melissa Wijfje	(Netherlands) Melissa Wijfje	(Netherlands) Sanneke de Neeling	South Korea		—N/a	
2015–16	(Russia) Darya Kachanova	(Japan) Rio Yamada	(China) Han Mei	(South Korea) Park Ji-woo	(Japan) Ayano Sato	Netherlands		—N/a	
2016–17	(Russia) Darya Kachanova	(Russia) Darya Kachanova	(Netherlands) Sanne in 't Hof	(Netherlands) Sanne in 't Hof	(South Korea) Jeon Mi-ryeong	Netherlands		—N/a	
2017–18	(Netherlands) Femke Beuling	(Netherlands) Jutta Leerdam	(Netherlands) Jutta Leerdam	(Netherlands) Joy Beune	(Italy) Laura Peveri	Netherlands		—N/a	
2018–19	(Netherlands) Michelle de Jong	(Netherlands) Robin Groot	(Netherlands) Paulien Verhaar	(Netherlands) Paulien Verhaar	(Italy) Laura Peveri	Netherlands		—N/a	
2019–20	(Netherlands) Marrit Fledderus	(Netherlands) Marrit Fledderus	(Netherlands) Merel Conijn	(Netherlands) Robin Groot	(Italy) Laura Peveri	Netherlands		—N/a	
2020–21	Cancelled due to the COVID-19 pandemic								
2021–22	(Netherlands) Pien Smit	(Netherlands) Pien Smit	(Kazakhstan) Alina Dauranova	(Netherlands) Evelien Vijn	(South Korea) Park Chae-won	Netherlands			
2022–23	(Netherlands) Pien Hersman	(Kazakhstan) Alina Dauranova	(South Korea) Kang Soo-min	(Netherlands) Jade Groenewoud	(Netherlands) Chloé Hoogendoorn	Netherlands			
2023–24	(South Korea) Jung Hui-dan	(Netherlands) Meike Veen	(Netherlands) Meike Veen	(Norway) Aurora Grinden Løvås	(South Korea) Cho Seo-yeon	Netherlands			
2024–25	(South Korea) Jung Hui-dan	(Poland) Hanna Mazur	(Austria) Jeannine Rosner	(Austria) Jeannine Rosner	(Poland) Hanna Mazur	Netherlands			
2025–26	(Poland) Wiktoria Dąbrowska	(Kazakhstan) Kristina Shumekova	(Germany) Neele Göpelt	(Kazakhstan) Kristina Shumekova	(Netherlands) Mette ten Cate	Germany			

=== Neo-Senior ===
==== Men ====
Season	500 m	1000 m	1500 m	3000 m	Mass start	Team distances	Ref
2016–17	(Italy) Luca Zanghellini	(Russia) Daniil Bobyr	(Germany) Manuel Gras	(Italy) Daniel Niero	(Belarus) Anton Kapustin	Russia	
2017–18	(Russia) Viktor Mushtakov	(Russia) Victor Lobas	(Russia) Victor Lobas	(Norway) Runar Njåtun Krøyer	(Poland) Marcin Bachanek	Russia	
2018–19	(Norway) Odin By Farstad	(Norway) Odin By Farstad	(Russia) Egor Shkolin	(Russia) Egor Shkolin	(Russia) Egor Shkolin	Germany	
2019–20	(Italy) Jeffrey Rosanelli	(Norway) Kristian Solland Reinton	(Norway) Vetle Stangeland	(Norway) Vetle Stangeland	(Norway) Vetle Stangeland	Belarus	
2020–21	Cancelled due to the COVID-19 pandemic						
2021–22	(Germany) Niklas Kurzmann	(Germany) Michael Roth	(Germany) Michael Roth	(Norway) John Granli	(Italy) Mattia Peghini	Germany	
2022–23	(Spain) Nil Llop	(Norway) Kasper Tveter	(Norway) Kasper Tveter	(Norway) Kasper Tveter	(France) Germain Deschamps	Czech Republic	
2023–24	(South Korea) Oh Sang-hun	(South Korea) Kim Kyung-rae	(South Korea) Kim Kyung-rae	(Spain) Manuel Robla	(Norway) Sigurd Holbø Dyrset	Spain	
2024–25	(Italy) Mattia Bernabè	(Hungary) Bálint Bödei	(South Korea) Lee Seung-hyun	(Italy) Manuel Ghiotto	(Germany) Gabriel Groß	Italy	
2025–26	(South Korea) Lee Byeong-hun	(Kazakhstan) Andrey Semenov	(South Korea) Jung In-woo	(Italy) Manuel De Carli	(Germany) Tomy Nguyen	Germany	

==== Women ====
Season	500 m	1000 m	1500 m	3000 m	Mass start	Team distances	Ref
2016–17	(Russia) Alexandra Kachurkina	(Russia) Alexandra Kachurkina	(Russia) Alexandra Kachurkina	(Russia) Anastasia Zuyeva	(China) Li Sishan	Russia	
2017–18	(Poland) Kaja Ziomek	(Russia) Veronika Suslova	(Russia) Veronika Suslova	(Russia) Anastasia Zuyeva	(Russia) Veronika Suslova	Russia	
2018–19	(Russia) Irina Kuznetsova	(Russia) Irina Kuznetsova	(Russia) Veronika Suslova	(China) Ahenaer Adake	(Russia) Veronika Suslova	China	
2019–20	(Romania) Mihaela Hogaș	(Germany) Lea-Sophie Scholz	(Germany) Josie Hofmann	(Germany) Josie Hofmann	(China) Ahenaer Adake	Germany	
2020–21	Cancelled due to the COVID-19 pandemic						
2021–22	(Russia) Irina Kuznetsova	(Russia) Irina Kuznetsova	(Russia) Ekaterina Kosheleva	(Italy) Laura Peveri	(Italy) Laura Peveri	Germany	
2022–23	(Germany) Sophie Warmuth	(Germany) Josephine Heimerl	(Czech Republic) Veronika Antošová	(Norway) Marte Bjerkreim Furnée	(Spain) Ainoa Carreño	Germany	
2023–24	(Kazakhstan) Margarita Galiyeva	(Spain) Sara Cabrera	(Italy) Laura Peveri	(Italy) Laura Peveri	(Italy) Laura Peveri	Kazakhstan	
2024–25	(Hungary) Hanna Biró	(Italy) Maybritt Vigl	(Norway) Ina Nakken	(Germany) Julia Bachl	(Germany) Ashley Völker	Norway	
2025–26	(Kazakhstan) Alina Dauranova	(Kazakhstan) Darja Vazhenina	(Kazakhstan) Marija Degen	(Germany) Ashley Völker	(Germany) Ashley Völker	Germany	

== See also ==
- ISU Speed Skating World Cup
- World Junior Speed Skating Championships
- List of world cups and world championships for juniors and youth
