= List of Belgian records in speed skating =

The following are the national records in speed skating in Belgium maintained by the Koninklijke Belgische Snelschaatsfederatie (KBSF).

== Men ==
Event	Record	Athlete	Date	Meet	Place	Ref
500 meters	34.92	Mathias Vosté	27 January 2024	World Cup	Salt Lake City, United States	
500 meters × 2	73.20	Robbe Beelen	8 November 2024		Heerenveen, Netherlands	
1000 meters	1:07.46	Mathias Vosté	28 January 2024	World Cup	Salt Lake City, United States	
1500 meters	1:42.48	Bart Swings	15 November 2015	World Cup	Calgary, Canada	
3000 meters	3:36.98	Bart Swings	19 December 2020	Oefensessie 9	Heerenveen, Netherlands	
5000 meters	6:08.76	Bart Swings	3 December 2021	World Cup	Salt Lake City	
10000 meters	12:44.75	Bart Swings	6 December 2025	World Cup	Heerenveen, Netherlands	
Team sprint (3 laps)	1:29.21	Tom Mulder; Finn Turcksin; Laurens Bergé	4 February 2023	Junior World Cup	Inzell, Germany	
Team pursuit (8 laps)	3:40.79	Jason Suttels; Indra Médard; Bart Swings	16 February 2024	World Single Distances Championships	Calgary, Canada	
Sprint combination	138.025 pts	Mathias Vosté	7–8 March 2024	World Sprint Championships	Inzell, Germany	
Small combination	151.183 pts	Bart Veldkamp	19–20 March 1999	Olympic Oval Final	Calgary, Canada	
Big combination	147.796 pts	Bart Swings	9–10 March 2024	World Allround Championships	Inzell, Germany	

== Women ==
Event	Record	Athlete	Date	Meet	Place	Ref
500 meters	38.06	Fran Vanhoutte	16 November 2025	World Cup	Salt Lake City, United States	
500 meters	38.06	Fran Vanhoutte	22 November 2025	World Cup	Calgary, Canada	
500 meters × 2	78.05	Fran Vanhoutte	25 October 2024		Inzell, Germany	
1000 meters	1:14.72	Isabelle van Elst	24 January 2025	World Cup	Calgary, Canada	
1500 meters	1:54.00	Isabelle van Elst	22 November 2025	World Cup	Calgary, Canada	
3000 meters	3:59.42	Sandrine Tas	21 November 2025	World Cup	Calgary, Canada	
5000 meters	6:46.47	Sandrine Tas	12 February 2026	Olympic Games	Milan, Italy	
10000 meters						
Team sprint (3 laps)	1:32.65	Stien Vanhoutte; Isabelle van Elst; Sandrine Tas	9 January 2026	European Championships	Tomaszów Mazowiecki, Poland	
Team pursuit (6 laps)	2:58.38	Stien Vanhoutte; Isabelle van Elst; Sandrine Tas	16 November 2025	World Cup	Salt Lake City, United States	
Sprint combination	154.335 pts	Isabelle van Elst	7–8 March 2024	World Sprint Championships	Inzell, Germany	
Mini combination	170.541 pts	Jelena Peeters	22–23 December 2012	Belgian Allround Championships	Eindhoven, Netherlands	
Small combination	164.139 pts	Sandrine Tas	11–12 January 2025		Heerenveen, Netherlands	
Small combination	161.231 pts	Sandrine Tas	7–8 March 2026	World Allround Championships	Heerenveen, Netherlands	
