= 2019 World Junior Speed Skating Championships =

International speed skating competition

- Venue: Stadio del Ghiaccio, Baselga di Piné, Italy
- Dates: 15–17 February

Medalist men
1st place, gold medalist(s)		Chung Jae-won	South Korea
2nd place, silver medalist(s)		Stepan Chistiakov	Russia
3rd place, bronze medalist(s)		Francesco Betti	Italy

Medalist women
1st place, gold medalist(s)		Femke Kok	Netherlands
2nd place, silver medalist(s)		Karolina Bosiek	Poland
3rd place, bronze medalist(s)		Ragne Wiklund	Norway

The 2019 World Junior Speed Skating Championships took place from 15 to 17 February 2019 in Stadio del Ghiaccio, Baselga di Piné, Italy. They were the 46th World Junior Speed Skating Championships.

== Schedule ==
All times are local (UTC+1).

Date	Time	Events
15 February	11:00	500 m women
15 February	11:00	500 m men
15 February	11:00	1500 m women
15 February	11:00	1500 m men
16 February	11:00	1000 m women
16 February	11:00	1000 m men
16 February	11:00	3000 m women
16 February	11:00	5000 m men
17 February	13:30	Team sprint women
17 February	13:30	Team sprint men
17 February	13:30	Team pursuit women
17 February	13:30	Team pursuit men
17 February	13:30	Mass start women
17 February	13:30	Mass start men

== Medal summary ==
=== Medal table ===
* Host nation (Italy)

Rank	Nation	Gold	Silver	Bronze	Total
1	Netherlands (NED)	7	5	4	16
2	South Korea (KOR)	2	2	0	4
3	Norway (NOR)	2	1	3	6
4	Japan (JPN)	2	0	2	4
5	Italy (ITA)*	1	0	2	3
6	Austria (AUT)	1	0	0	1
6	Germany (GER)	1	0	0	1
8	Russia (RUS)	0	5	4	9
9	Poland (POL)	0	2	2	4
10	China (CHN)	0	1	0	1
Totals (10 entries)		16	16	17	49

=== Men's events ===
Event	Gold		Silver		Bronze	
500 m	Koki Kubo; Japan	36.22	Artem Arefyev; Russia	36.28	Katsuhiro Kuratsubo; Japan Janno Botman; Netherlands	36.35(9)
1000 m	Janno Botman; Netherlands	1:11.25	Chung Jae-won; South Korea	1:11.60	Stepan Chistiakov; Russia	1:11.92
1500 m	Chung Jae-won; South Korea	1:48.82	Sergei Loginov; Russia	1:50.81	Francesco Betti; Italy	1:50.83
5000 m	Lukas Mann; Germany	6:41.51	Hallgeir Engebråten; Norway	6:42.41	Daniil Aldoshkin; Russia	6:46.05
Mass start	Gabriel Odor; Austria	30 pts	Merijn Scheperkamp; Netherlands	20 pts	Tsubasa Horikawa; Japan	10 pts
Team pursuit	Norway; Isak Høiby; Hallgeir Engebråten; Tobias Fløiten	3:56.50	Russia; Daniil Aldoshkin; Sergei Loginov; Stepan Chistiakov	3:57.28	Netherlands; Merijn Scheperkamp; Jordy van Workum; Yves Vergeer	3:58.32
Team sprint	Netherlands; Janno Botman; Merijn Scheperkamp; Mika van Essen	1:25.13	South Korea; Oh Sang-hun; Cho Sang-hyeok; Park Seong-hyeon	1:25.31	Russia; Sergei Loginov; Nikolai Trusov; Artem Arefyev	1:25.37
Overall classification	Chung Jae-won; South Korea	150.278	Stepan Chistiakov; Russia	151.858	Francesco Betti; Italy	151.912

=== Women's events ===
Event	Gold		Silver		Bronze	
500 m	Femke Beuling; Netherlands	38.38	Femke Kok; Netherlands	38.64	Michelle de Jong; Netherlands	38.81
1000 m	Michelle de Jong; Netherlands	1:17.68	Femke Kok; Netherlands	1:18.16	Karolina Bosiek; Poland	1:18.61
1500 m	Femke Kok; Netherlands	2:03.73	Karolina Bosiek; Poland	2:03.75	Ragne Wiklund; Norway	2:04.08
3000 m	Ragne Wiklund; Norway	4:20.01	Robin Groot; Netherlands	4:20.24	Karolina Bosiek; Poland	4:20.26
Mass start	Laura Peveri; Italy	30 pts	Ma Yuhan; China	20 pts	Robin Groot; Netherlands	10 pts
Team pursuit	Japan; Karuna Koyama; Lemi Williamson; Rin Kosaka	3:11.39	Netherlands; Robin Groot; Femke Kok; Paulien Verhaar	3:11.79	Russia; Elizaveta Agafoshina; Kristina Silaeva; Anastasiia Grigoreva	3:16.20
Team sprint	Netherlands; Michelle de Jong; Femke Kok; Femke Beuling	1:31.72	Russia; Kristina Silaeva; Anna Vashkene; Anastasia Korkina	1:34.20	Norway; Ragne Wiklund; Julie Nistad Samsonsen; Ane By Farstad	1:35.55
Overall classification	Femke Kok; Netherlands	163.331	Karolina Bosiek; Poland	163.621	Ragne Wiklund; Norway	164.420
