= 2018 KNSB Dutch Single Distance Championships – Women's 1500 m =

- Venue: Thialf, Heerenveen, Netherlands
- Date: 28 October 2017
- Competitors: 24 skaters

Medalist men
1st place, gold medalist(s)		Jorien ter Mors	NED
2nd place, silver medalist(s)		Ireen Wüst	NED
3rd place, bronze medalist(s)		Marrit Leenstra	NED

The women's 1500 meter at the 2018 KNSB Dutch Single Distance Championships took place in Heerenveen at the Thialf ice skating rink on Saturday 28 October 2017. Although this tournament was held in 2017, it was part of the 2017–2018 speed skating season.

There were 24 participants.

Title holder was Ireen Wüst.

== Result ==
Rank	Skater	Time
1st place, gold medalist(s)	Jorien ter Mors	1:54.93
2nd place, silver medalist(s)	Ireen Wüst	1:56.17
3rd place, bronze medalist(s)	Marrit Leenstra	1:56.64
4	Antoinette de Jong	1:57.47
5	Lotte van Beek	1:57.68
6	Joy Beune	1:58.13
7	Melissa Wijfje	1:58.37
8	Linda de Vries	1:58.52
9	Carlijn Achtereekte	1:59.04
10	Sanne van der Schaar	1:59.45
11	Roxanne van Hemert	1:59.77
12	Letitia de Jong	1:59.91
13	Sanneke de Neeling	1:59.94
14	Jutta Leerdam	2:01.06
15	Reina Anema	2:01.09
16	Aveline Hijlkema	2:01.10
17	Elisa Dul	2:01.17
18	Annouk van der Weijden	2:01.68
19	Esther Kiel	2:01.76
20	Manouk van Tol	2:03.23
21	Natasja Roest	2:03.26 PR
22	Ineke Dedden	2:04.42
23	Marije Joling	2:04.62
24	Elma de Vries	2:09.04
