= Elisa Dul =

Dutch speed skater

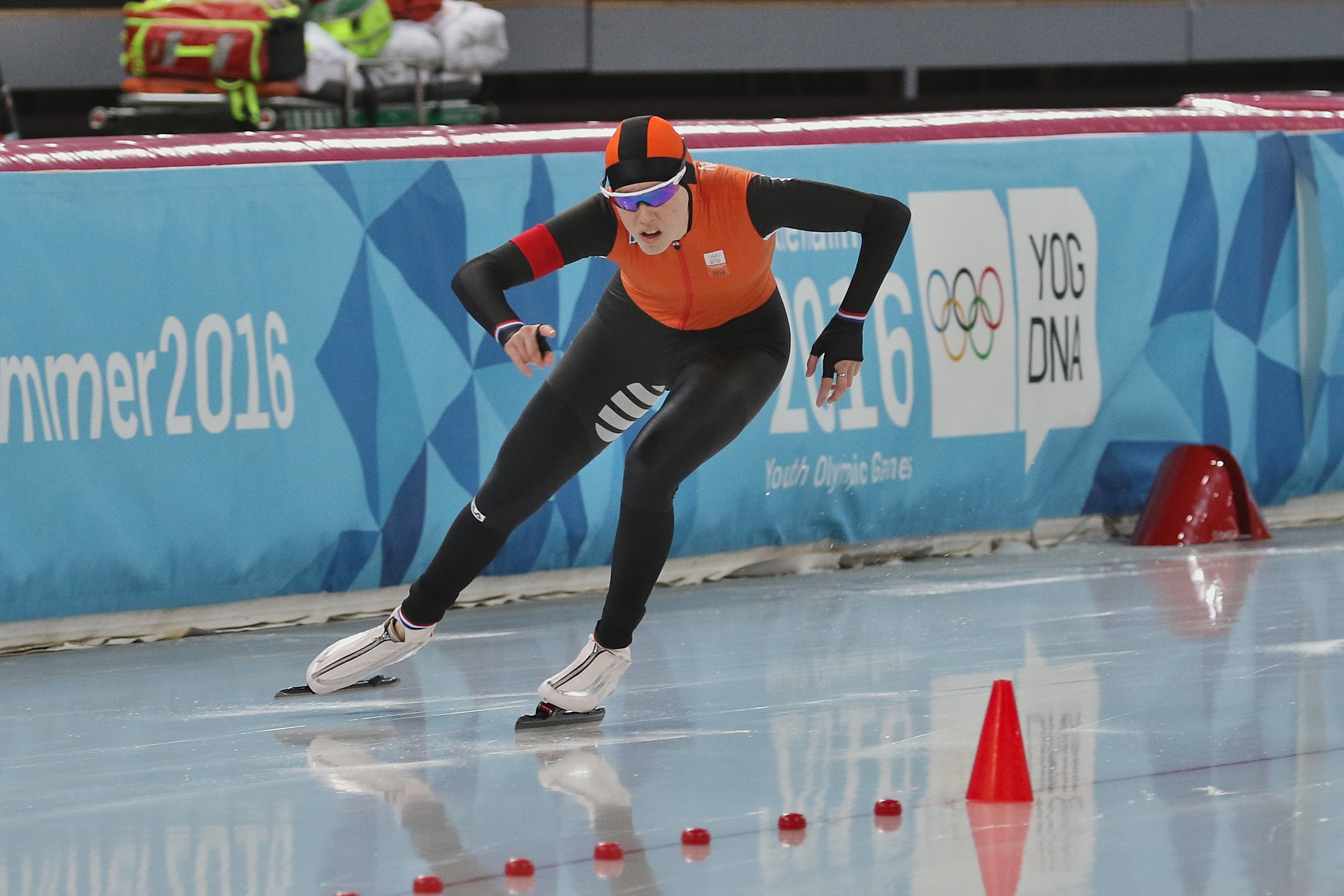
- Dul at the 2016 Winter Youth Olympics

Personal information
- Born: 21 September 1998 (age 28) Oene, Gelderland
- Height: 1.74 m (5 ft 9 in)
- Weight: 66 kg (146 lb)

Sport
- Country: Netherlands
- Sport: Speed skating

Elisa Dul (born 21 September 1998) is a Dutch long track speed skater. Dul is a member of Team Zaanlander, (previously Team easyJet), trained by Jillert Anema.

== Career ==
=== Junior ===
As a junior Dul participated at the 2016 Winter Youth Olympics and 2018 and 2018 World Junior Speed Skating Championships. At the 2017 World Junior Speed Skating Championships Dul became world junior champion in the mass start and team pursuit. At the 2018 World Junior Speed Skating Championships she became again junior world champion in the team pursuit in a junior world record. At these championships she also won bronze in the 1000 metres event, 1500 metres event and overall. In total she won five ISU Junior World Cup Speed Skating events.

=== Senior ===
Dul won the bronze medal at the 2019 KNSB Dutch Single Distance Championships in the mass start event. Dul made her ISU Speed Skating World Cup debut during the 2018-19 World Cup in Hamar, Norway in the 1000 metres event, finishing 6th in the B-division. Selected by the national coach Jan Coopmans, Dul competed at the 2019-20 ISU Speed Skating World Cup in Nagano, Japan in the mass start and team pursuit events.

== Records ==
=== Personal records ===
As of 26 December 2022

Personal records
Speed skating
Event	Result	Date	Location	Notes
500 m	38.66	11 February 2020	Salt Lake City	
1000 m	1:15.19	7 February 2020	Calgary	
1500 m	1:54.68	29 December 2021	Heerenveen	
3000 m	4:00.56	28 October 2023	Heerenveen	

== Tournament overview ==
Season	Dutch Championships Single Distances	Dutch Championships Sprint	World Championships Juniors
2016–17	HEERENVEEN 17th 1000m 26th mass start		HELSINKI (gold) mass start
2017–18	HEERENVEEN 19th 500m 15th 1000m 17th 1500m		SALT LAKE CITY 6th 500m (bronze) 1500m (bronze) 1000m 5th 3000m (bronze) overall
2018–19	HEERENVEEN 9th 1000m 12th 1500m	HEERENVEEN 14th 500m 5th 1000m 11th 500m 5th 1000m 8th overall	
2019–20	HEERENVEEN 4th 1000m 9th 1500m 7th mass start	HEERENVEEN 14th 500m 7th 1000m 12th 500m 5th 1000m 8th overall	
2020–21	HEERENVEEN 14th 500m 10th 1000m 9th 1500m	HEERENVEEN 14th 500m 14th 1000m DNS 500m DNQ 1000m NC overall	
