= Anna Boersma =

Dutch speed skater (born 2001)

Personal information
- Nationality: Dutch
- Born: 2 April 2001 (age 25) Sint Nicolaasga, Netherlands

Sport
- Country: Netherlands
- Sport: Speed skating
- Event: 500 m
- Turned pro: 2021

Anna Boersma (born 2 April 2001) is a Dutch speed skater. Boersma represented the Netherlands during the 2025–26 ISU World Cup at the 500 meter event. The Dutch team with Boersma, Marrit Fledderus and Jutta Leerdam won the team sprint event at the World Cup 3 and set a sea-level world record for the discipline. Boersma was selected to represent her country at the 2026 Winter Olympics.

== Career ==
Boersma scored a second place in the 500 meter race at the Dutch national championships in October 2025 and was selected in the Dutch team for the 2025–26 World Cup races. She made her international debut in Salt Lake City in November 2025 at World Cup 1, placing 5th and 7th. The Dutch team with Boersma, Fledderus and Leerdam won the team sprint event at World Cup 3 and established a new Thialf track record and sea-level world record. At the Dutch Olympic Qualifying Tournament in Heerenveen in December 2025, Boersma scored a third place at the 500 meter race and qualified for the 2026 Winter Olympics.
