= Marrit Fledderus =

Dutch speed skater (born 2001)

Personal information
- Born: 15 May 2001 (age 25) Sint Nicolaasga, Netherlands

Sport
- Country: Netherlands
- Sport: Speed skating
Medal record
Women's speed skating
Representing the Netherlands
World Sprint Championships
Bronze medal – third place	2026 Heerenveen	Sprint
European Championships
Gold medal – first place	2024 Heerenveen	Team sprint

Marrit Fledderus (born 15 May 2001) is a Dutch long-track speed skater.

As a junior, Fledderus became national champion in the 500 metres in 2020. She represented her nation at the 2021 World Junior Speed Skating Championships. She became junior world champion in the team sprint and won the bronze medal in the 1000 metres event. Fledderus won also several 2019–20 ISU Junior World Cup Speed Skating races in the 500 metres, 1000 metres and team sprint.

As a senior Fledderus won the bronze medal at the 2021 Dutch Single Distance Championships in the 500 metres event.

== Records ==
=== Personal records ===
Personal records
Speed skating
Event	Result	Date	Location	Notes
500 m	37.08	23 November 2025	Olympic Oval, Calgary	
1000 m	1:13.11	15 November 2025	Utah Olympic Oval, Salt Lake City	
1500 m	2:03.46	5 January 2020	Max Aicher Arena, Inzell	
3000 m	4:28.93	29 September 2019	Thialf, Heerenveen	

== Tournament overview ==
Season	Dutch Championships Single Distances	Dutch Championships Sprint	World Championships Juniors
2019–20	HEERENVEEN 13th 500m		TOMASZÓW MAZOWIECKI DNF 500m (bronze) 1000m (gold) team sprint
2020–21	HEERENVEEN (bronze) 500m 7th 1000m	HEERENVEEN 4th 500m 6th 1000m 5th 500m 6th 1000m 5th overall	
2021–22	HEERENVEEN 4th 500m 4th 1000m	HEERENVEEN (bronze) 500m (bronze) 1000m (bronze) 500m 5th 1000m (silver) overall	
