= Femke Beuling =

Dutch speed skater (born 1999)

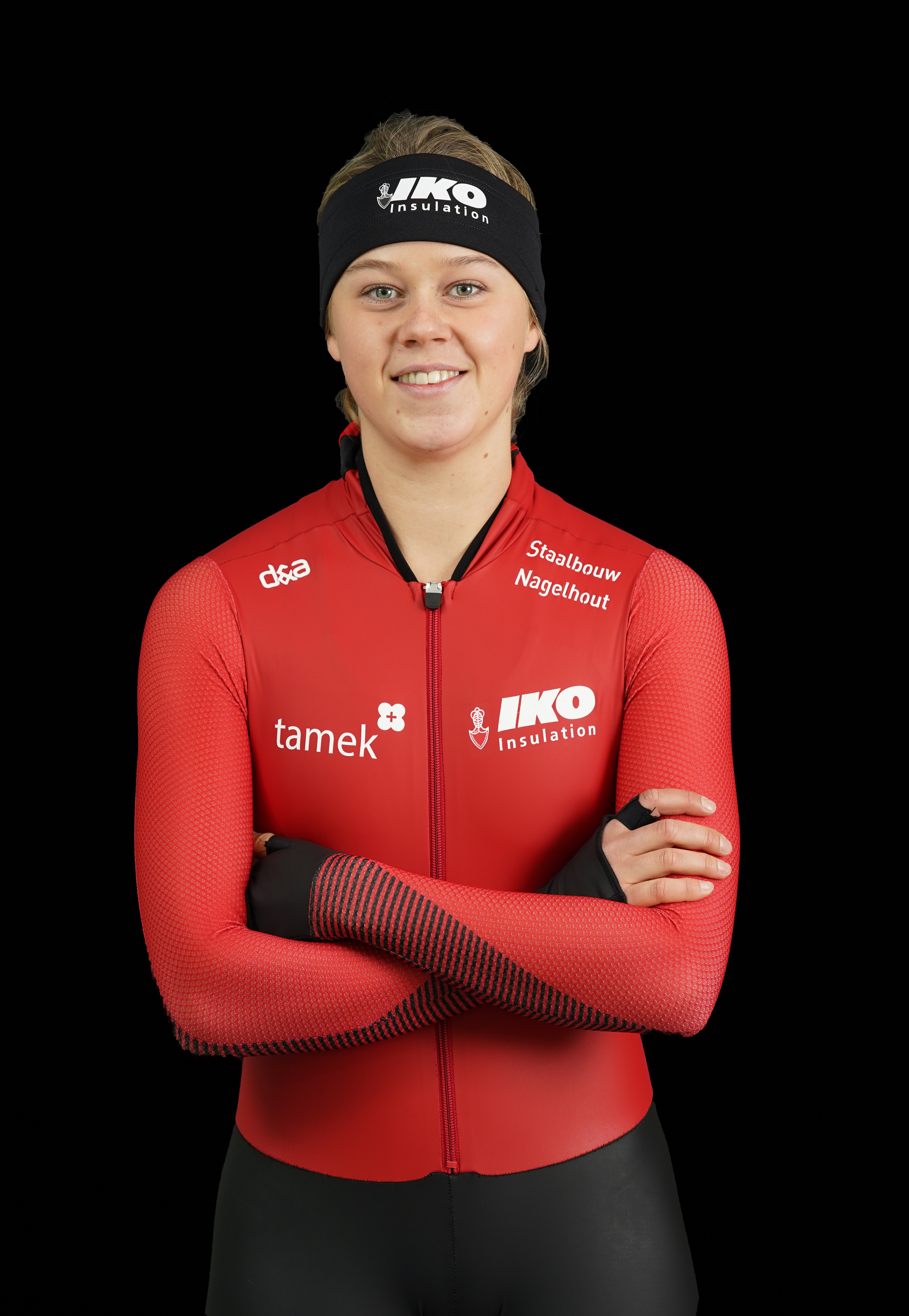
- Beuling in 2020

Personal information
- Born: 20 December 1999 (age 26) Emmeloord, Netherlands
- Height: 1.75 m (5 ft 9 in)
- Weight: 65 kg (143 lb)

Sport
- Country: Netherlands
- Sport: Speed skating
- Turned pro: 2018
Medal record
Women's speed skating
Junior World Championships
| Gold medal – first place | 2019 Baselga di Piné | Team sprint |

Femke Beuling (pronounced [ˈfɛmkə ˈbøːlɪŋ]; born 20 December 1999) is a Dutch speed skater who specializes in the sprint distances.

== Career ==
At the Dutch qualifying tournament in November 2018 she won a ticket for the first three World Cup 500 m events. At the first competition weekend of the 2018–19 ISU Speed Skating World Cup in Obihiro, Japan she finished second in the second 500 m Division B. This earned her a promotion to the Division A at the second competition weekend in Tomakomai, Japan where she finished last in the first 500 m event.

== Personal records ==
Personal records
Speed skating
| Event | Result | Date | Location | Notes |
| 500 m | 38.09 | 30 October 2021 | Thialf, Heerenveen | |
| 1000 m | 1:16.55 | 11 December 2021 | Olympic Oval, Calgary | |
| 1500 m | 2:02.13 | 17 November 2019 | Thialf, Heerenveen | |
| 3000 m | 4:32.91 | 4 March 2017 | Thialf, Heerenveen | |

== Tournament overview ==
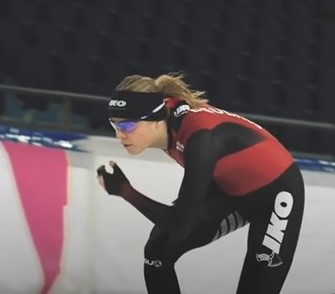
Beuling (2019)

| Season | Dutch Championships Single Distances | Dutch Championships Sprint | World Championships Junior | World Cup GWC |
|---|---|---|---|---|
| 2017–18 | HEERENVEEN 7th 500m 18th 1000m | | SALT LAKE CITY DQ 500m 6th 1000m (gold) team sprint | |
| 2018–19 | HEERENVEEN 6th 500m 16th 1000m | | BASELGA di PINÈ (gold) 500m 6th 1000m (gold) team sprint | 26th 500m |
| 2019–20 | HEERENVEEN 4th 500m 13th 1000m | HEERENVEEN 9th 500m 11th 1000m 9th 500m 9th 1000m 9th overall | | 45th 500m |
| 2020–21 | HEERENVEEN 9th 500m 13th 1000m | | | |
| 2021–22 | HEERENVEEN 7th 500m 22nd 1000m | HEERENVEEN 8th 500m 14th 1000m 7th 500m 11th 1000m 11th overall | | 46th 500m |

== World Cup overview ==
| Season | 500 meter | | | | | | | | | | |
|---|---|---|---|---|---|---|---|---|---|---|---|
| 2018–19 | 7th(b) | 2nd(b) | 20th | 3rd(b) | 20th | 20th | – | – | – | – | – |
| 2019–20 | – | – | – | – | – | – | – | 6th(b) | | | |
| 2021–22 | – | – | – | – | – | – | 12th(b) | 10th(b) | – | – | |

- (b) = Division B
