= Michelle de Jong =

Dutch speed skater

Personal information
- Nationality: Dutch
- Born: 1999 (age 26–27) Heerenveen, Netherlands
- Height: 1.75 m (5 ft 9 in)
- Weight: 66 kg (146 lb)

Sport
- Country: Netherlands
- Sport: Speed skating
- Club: Team Reggeborch
- Turned pro: 2019
Medal record
Women's speed skating
World Junior Championships
Gold medal – first place	2019 Baselga di Piné	1000 m
Gold medal – first place	2019 Baselga di Piné	Team sprint
Bronze medal – third place	2019 Baselga di Piné	500 m

Michelle de Jong (born 1999) is a Dutch long track speed skater who specializes in the sprint distances.

== Career ==
In February 2019, de Jong became junior world champion in the 1000 m event at the 2019 World Junior Championships in Baselga di Piné, Italy. She won the bronze medal in the 500 m event.

In 2019 she turned professional and became a member of Team Reggeborch.

== Personal life ==
She is the younger sister of speed skater Antoinette de Jong.

== Personal records ==
Personal records
Speed skating
Event	Result	Date	Location	Notes
500 m	37.48	16 December 2022	Olympic Oval, Calgary	
1000 m	1:14.29	11 December 2022	Olympic Oval, Calgary	
1500 m	2:02.03	9 March 2018	Utah Olympic Oval, Salt Lake City	
3000 m	4:40.52	5 February 2017	Thialf, Heerenveen	

== Tournament overview ==
Season	Dutch Championships Single Distances	Dutch Championships Sprint	European Championships Single Distances	World Championships Sprint	Olympic Games	World Cup	World Championships Single Distances	World Championships Juniors
2017–18	HEERENVEEN 14th 500m							SALT LAKE CITY (bronze) 500m 17th 1500m (gold) Team sprint
2018–19	HEERENVEEN 12th 500m 20th 1000m							BASELGA DI PINÈ (bronze) 500m (gold) 1000m (gold) Team sprint
2019–20	HEERENVEEN 7th 500m 16th 1000m	HEERENVEEN 12th 500m 17th 1000m 5th 500m 11th 1000m 12th overall				19th 500m		
2020–21		HEERENVEEN (bronze) 500m 8th 1000m (bronze) 500m 10th 1000m 4th overall				4th 500m 20th 1000m		
2021–22	HEERENVEEN (bronze) 500m 13th 1000m	HEERENVEEN (gold) 500m (silver) 1000m (gold) 500m (silver) 1000m (gold) overall	HEERENVEEN 5th 500 m 6th 1000 m	HAMAR 6th 500m 10th 1000m 5th 500m 5th 1000m 6th overall	BEIJING 13th 500m			
2022–23	HEERENVEEN (bronze) 500m (bronze) 1000m	HEERENVEEN 4th 500m 5th 1000m 4th 500m 7th 1000m 5th overall				6th 500m 10th 1000m 6th team sprint	HEERENVEEN 7th 500m 10th 1000m 5th team sprint	
