= Jorien ter Mors =

Dutch short and long track speed skater

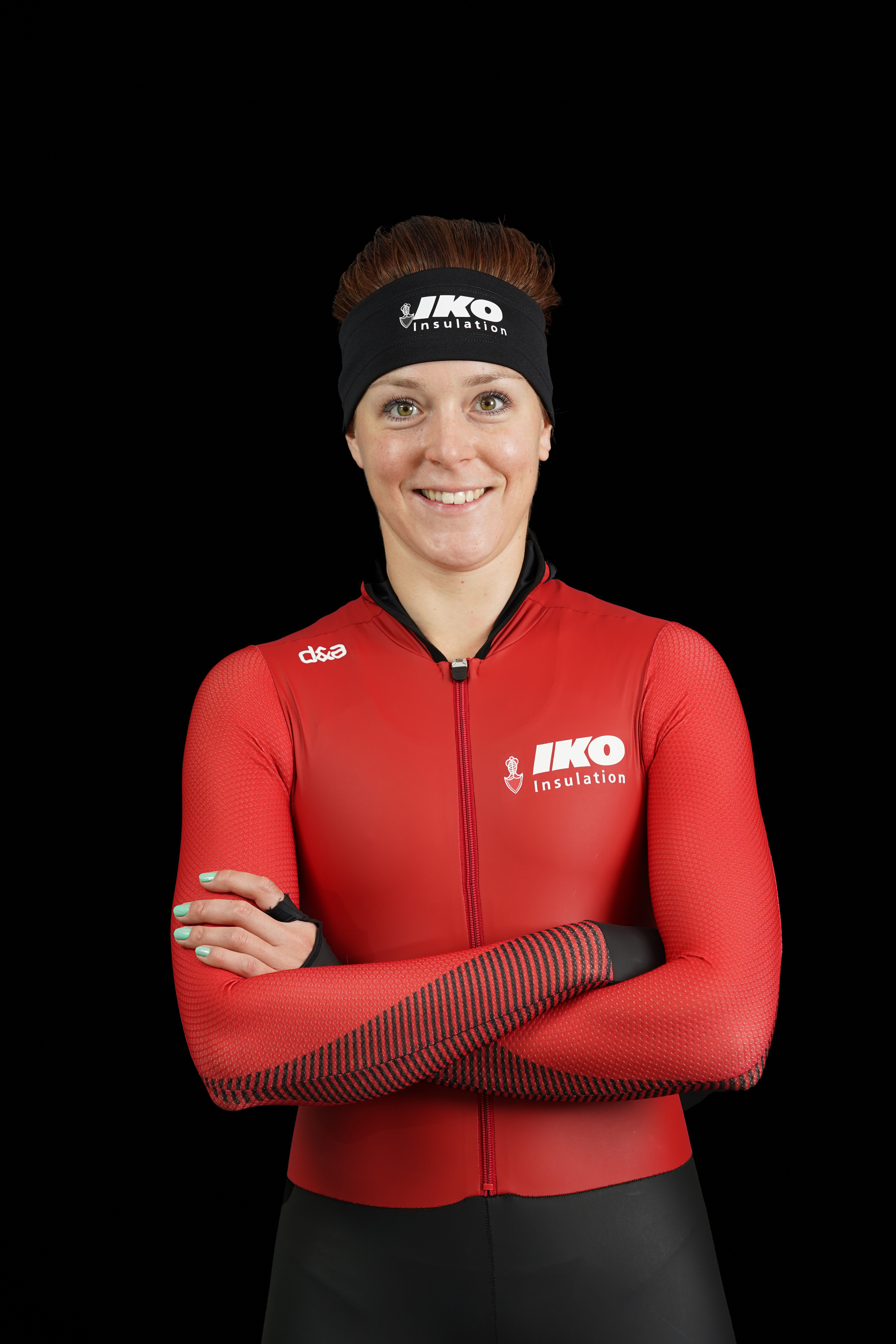
- Jorien ter Mors in 2020

Personal information
- Born: 21 December 1989 (age 36) Enschede, Netherlands
- Height: 1.82 m (6 ft 0 in)
- Weight: 73 kg (161 lb)

Sport
- Country: Netherlands
- Sport: Speed skating Short track speed skating
- Coached by: Jeroen Otter
Medal record
Women's speed skating
Representing Netherlands
Winter Olympics
Gold medal – first place	2014 Sochi	1500 m
Gold medal – first place	2014 Sochi	Team pursuit
Gold medal – first place	2018 Pyeongchang	1000 m
World Sprint Championships
Gold medal – first place	2018 Changchun	Sprint
Bronze medal – third place	2016 Seoul	Sprint
Bronze medal – third place	2017 Calgary	Sprint
World Single Distances Championships
Gold medal – first place	2016 Kolomna	1000 m
Gold medal – first place	2016 Kolomna	1500 m
Bronze medal – third place	2017 Gangneung	1000 m
European Championships
Silver medal – second place	2017 Heerenveen	Sprint
Women's short track speed skating
Winter Olympics
Bronze medal – third place	2018 Pyeongchang	3000 m relay
World Championships
Silver medal – second place	2011 Sheffield	3000 m relay
Silver medal – second place	2013 Debrecen	1000 m
Bronze medal – third place	2013 Debrecen	3000 m
European Championships
Gold medal – first place	2011 Heerenveen	3000 m
Gold medal – first place	2012 Mlada Boleslav	1000 m
Gold medal – first place	2012 Mlada Boleslav	3000 m relay
Gold medal – first place	2013 Malmö	3000 m relay
Gold medal – first place	2014 Dresden	Overall
Gold medal – first place	2014 Dresden	1500 m
Gold medal – first place	2014 Dresden	3000 m
Gold medal – first place	2014 Dresden	3000 m relay
Gold medal – first place	2016 Sochi	3000 m relay
Silver medal – second place	2012 Mlada Boleslav	1500 m
Silver medal – second place	2012 Mlada Boleslav	3000 m
Silver medal – second place	2012 Mlada Boleslav	Overall
Silver medal – second place	2013 Malmö	500 m
Silver medal – second place	2013 Malmö	3000 m
Silver medal – second place	2014 Dresden	1000 m
Silver medal – second place	2016 Sochi	1500 m
Bronze medal – third place	2007 Sheffield	3000 m relay
Bronze medal – third place	2010 Dresden	3000 m relay
Bronze medal – third place	2013 Malmö	1000 m
Bronze medal – third place	2013 Malmö	Overall
Bronze medal – third place	2014 Dresden	500 m

Jorien ter Mors (Dutch pronunciation: [joːˈrin tɛr ˈmɔrs]; born 21 December 1989) is a retired Dutch speed skater on both short track and long track. She was the Olympic champion in the 1500 metres and team pursuit (long track) at the 2014 Winter Olympics and the 1000 metres at the 2018 Winter Olympics.

== Short track ==
Ter Mors competed at the 2010 Winter Olympics for the Netherlands. She placed third in her round one race of the 500 metres and was disqualified in the opening round of the 1000 metres, failing to advance. She was also a member of the Dutch 3000 metre relay team, which finished third in the semifinals and won the B Final, ending up fourth overall. Her best overall individual finish, is 23rd, in the 500 metres.

As of 2013, ter Mors has won two silver medals at the World Championships; the first came in 2011, as a member of the Dutch relay team, and the second in 2013 in the 1000 metres. She has also won three gold medals as a member of the Dutch relay team at the European Championships.

As of 2013, ter Mors has one ISU Short Track Speed Skating World Cup victory, coming as part of the Dutch relay team in 2012–13 at Dresden. She also has four other podium finishes. Her top World Cup ranking is 7th, in the 1500 metres in 2013–14.

On 13 February 2014, she skated the B-finals in the 500 metres and placed sixth in the overall standings. On 15 February 2014 she became fourth at the 1,500 metres during the 2014 Winter Olympics.

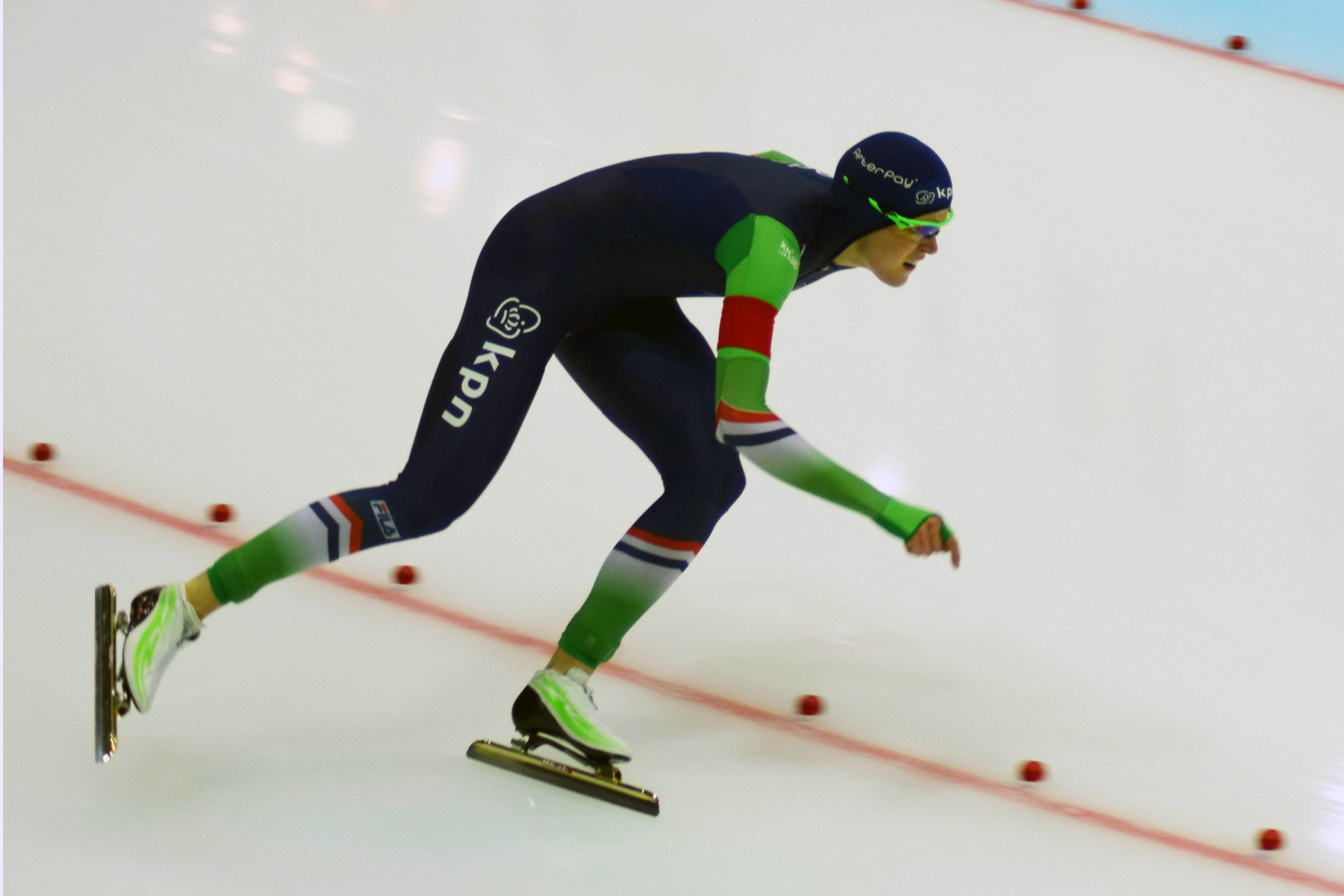
Jorien ter Mors in 2016

On 20 February 2018, she skated the B-finals in the 3,000 metres relay at the 2018 Winter Olympics and her team set the world record time of 4:03.471. Incredibly, their effort for that record was rewarded with a bronze medal because in the A-finals Canada and China both were penalized and disqualified leaving only two A-finals teams to get gold and silver. The Netherlands received a bronze medal even though they didn't skate in the A-finals. This was her first ever medal in short-track speed skating at the Olympics. Ter Mors became the third female athlete to win Olympic medals in two different sports at the same Winter Olympic Games.

== Long track ==
In 2012, ter Mors started competing in long track speed skating events. After winning the 2013 KNSB Dutch Allround Championships and the 1,500m at the 2014 KNSB Dutch Single Distance Championships she went back to short track, but in the 2013–14 World Cup 4 in Berlin she was part of the Dutch team that won a gold medal in the team pursuit.

At the Dutch Olympic trials, held on 26 –30 December 2013 in Thialf, Heerenveen, she participated in the 1,000, 1,500 and 3,000m but only qualified for the 1,500m where she finished in third place behind Ireen Wüst and Lotte van Beek. On 16 February 2014 she won the Olympic gold medal at the 1,500 metres during the 2014 Winter Olympics. She set a new Olympic record while doing so, with a time of 1:53.51, the second fastest time at sea level.

At the 2018 World Sprint Speed Skating Championships, ter Mors won her first world sprint championship gold medal. She previously won bronze in the 2016 and 2017 world sprint championships.

== World Cup podiums ==
=== Short track ===
Date	Season	Location	Rank	Event
5 December 2010	2010–11	Changchun	3rd place, bronze medalist(s)	3000 m relay
5 February 2012	2011–12	Moscow	3rd place, bronze medalist(s)	3000 m relay
11 February 2012	2011–12	Dordrecht	2nd place, silver medalist(s)	1000 m
10 February 2013	2012–13	Dresden	1st place, gold medalist(s)	3000 m relay
28 September 2013	2013–14	Shanghai	3rd place, bronze medalist(s)	1500 m

=== Long track ===
Date	Season	Location	Rank	Event
16 November 2012	2012–13	Heerenveen	3rd place, bronze medalist(s)	3000 m
17 November 2012	2012–13	Heerenveen	2nd place, silver medalist(s)	Mass start
8 December 2013	2013–14	Berlin	1st place, gold medalist(s)	Team pursuit

== Personal records ==
=== Long track ===
Personal records
Speed skating
Event	Result	Date	Location	Notes
500 m	37.39	26 February 2017	Olympic Oval, Calgary	
1000 m	1:12.53	25 February 2017	Olympic Oval, Calgary	
1500 m	1:53.51	16 February 2014	Sochi	Former OR
3000 m	4:02.23	6 December 2013	Berlin	
5000 m	7:06.79	30 December 2012	Thialf, Heerenveen	

She has a score of 158.276 in the adelskalender.

== Tournament overview–long track ==
Season	Dutch Championships Single Distances	Dutch Championships Allround	World Championships Sprint	World Championships Single Distances	Olympic Games	European Championships Sprint	Dutch Championships Sprint
2011–12	HEERENVEEN 8th 3000m						
2012–13	HEERENVEEN (bronze) 3000m	HEERENVEEN (silver) 500m (gold) 3000m (gold) 1500m (gold) 5000m (gold) overall					
2013–14	HEERENVEEN 5th 1000m (gold) 1500m (silver) 3000m				SOCHI (gold) 1500m (gold) team pursuit		
2014–15							
2015–16	HEERENVEEN DNS 500m (gold) 1000m (gold) 1500m		SEOUL 6th 500m (gold) 1000m 8th 500m (silver) 1000m (bronze) overall	KOLOMNA 4th 500m (gold) 1000m (gold) 1500m			
2016–17	HEERENVEEN (gold) 500m (gold) 1000m (silver) 1500m	HEERENVEEN (gold) 500m DNS 3000m DNS 1500m DNS 5000m NC overall	CALGARY 5th 500m (silver) 1000m 6th 500m (silver) 1000m (bronze) overall	GANGNEUNG 9th 500m (bronze) 1000m 5th 1500m		HEERENVEEN 4th 500m (gold) 1000m (bronze) 500m (gold) 1000m (silver) overall	
2017–18	HEERENVEEN (gold) 500m (gold) 1000m (gold) 1500m		CHANGCHUN (bronze) 500m (gold) 1000m (silver) 500m (gold) 1000m (gold) overall		GANGNEUNG 6th 500m (gold) 1000m		
2018–19							
2019–20	HEERENVEEN 6th 500m DQ 1000m 10th 1500m 13th Mass start		HAMAR 12th 500m (bronze) 1000m 12th 500m 4th 1000m 7th overall				HEERENVEEN 6th 500m (silver) 1000m (bronze) 500m (silver) 1000m (silver) overall
2020–21	HEERENVEEN 4th 500m 4th 1000m (gold) 1500m	HEERENVEEN (gold) 1000m 5th 3000m (silver) 1500m NQ 5000m NC(9) overall		HEERENVEEN 5th 1000m		HEERENVEEN 7th 500m (gold) 1000m 9th 500m (silver) 1000m 4th overall	
