= Sanneke de Neeling =

Dutch speed skater (born 1996)

Personal information
- Born: 19 April 1996 (age 30) Rotterdam, Netherlands

Sport
- Country: Netherlands
- Sport: Speed skating
Medal record
European Championships
Silver medal – second place	2018 Kolomma	Team sprint
Winter Youth Olympics
Gold medal – first place	2012 Innsbruck	3000 m
Gold medal – first place	2012 Innsbruck	Mass start
Silver medal – second place	2012 Innsbruck	1500m
Junior World Championships
Silver medal – second place	2015 Warsaw	1000m
Silver medal – second place	2015 Warsaw	1500m
Silver medal – second place	2015 Warsaw	3000m
Silver medal – second place	2015 Warsaw	Allround
Dutch Sprint Championships
Gold medal – first place	2016 Heerenveen	Sprint

Sanneke de Neeling (born 19 April 1996) is a Dutch speed skater who is specialized in the sprint and middle distances.

== Career ==
De Neeling won three medals at the Speed skating at the 2012 Winter Youth Olympics in Innsbruck, Austria. She won the silver medal at the 1500 meters and gold on both the 3000 meters and mass start. At the 2015 World Junior Speed Skating Championships in Warsaw she finished second.

De Neeling was part of the Dutch team which won the ISU World Cup Team sprint event in Heerenveen in December 2015. In January 2016 she won the title at the KNSB Dutch Sprint Championships.

From 2015 until 2018 she was a member of Team LottoNL-Jumbo. She currently skates for Gewest Fryslân.

== Personal records ==
Personal records
Speed skating
Event	Result	Date	Location	Notes
500 m	37.66	8 February 2020	Calgary	
1000 m	1:13.74	7 February 2020	Calgary	
1500 m	1:55.27	21 November 2015	Salt Lake City	
3000 m	4:16.23	27 December 2014	Heerenveen	

== Tournament overview ==
Season	Dutch Championships Single Distances	Dutch Championships Sprint	Dutch Championships Allround	Dutch Championships Junior	European Championships Sprint	World Championships Sprint	World Championships Single Distances	World Championships Junior	Youth Olympic Games	World Cup GWC	European Championships Single Distances
2009–10				Junior C (silver) 500m 5th 1500m (bronze) overall							
2010–11				Junior C (gold) 500m (gold) 1500m (gold) overall							
2011–12				Junior B (silver) 500m (gold) 1500m (gold) 1000m (gold) 3000m (gold) overall					INNSBRUCK (silver) 1500m (gold) 3000m (gold) mass start		
2012–13				Junior B (gold) 500m (gold) 1500m (gold) 1000m (silver) 3000m (gold) overall							
2013–14	HEERENVEEN 17th 500m 11th 1000m 16th 1500m			Junior A (gold) 500m (silver) 1500m (gold) 1000m 4th 3000m (silver) overall				BJUGN 5th 500m 5th 1000m (bronze) 1500m 6th 3000m 4th overall			
2014–15	HEERENVEEN 15th 500m 4th 1000m 7th 1500m		HEERENVEEN 8th 500m 16th 3000m 8th 1500m DNQ 5000m 11th overall	Junior A (gold) 500m (gold) 1500m (gold) 1000m (silver) 3000m (gold) overall				WARSAW 4th 500m (silver) 1500m (silver) 1000m (silver) 3000m (silver) overall (gold) team pursuit 7th mass start		31st 1000m 35th 1500m	
2015–16	HEERENVEEN 4th 1000m 13th 1500m	HEERENVEEN (silver) 500m (gold) 1000m 4th 500m (bronze) 1000m (gold) overall				SEOUL 26th 500m 16th 1000m 23rd 500m 18th 1000m 20th overall				14th 1000m 13th 1500m	
2016–17	HEERENVEEN 7th 500m 5th 1000m 4th 1500m	HEERENVEEN (gold) 500m (silver) 1000m (bronze) 500m 4th 1000m (bronze) overall			HEERENVEEN 10th 500m 7th 1000m 4th 500m 5th 1000m 7th overall	CALGARY 16th 500m 9th 1000m 20th 500m 8th 1000m 15th overall	GANGNEUNG 11th 1000m			32nd 500m 18th 1000m (silver) team sprint	
2017–18	HEERENVEEN (bronze) 500m 5th 1000m 13th 1500m	HEERENVEEN 4th 500m 5th 1000m (silver) 500m (silver) 1000m (bronze) overall								43rd 500m 34th 1000m (bronze) team sprint	KOLOMNA 7th 500m (silver) team sprint
2018–19	HEERENVEEN 4th 500m 4th 1000m 7th 1500m	HEERENVEEN 5th 500m 6th 1000m (bronze) 500m (bronze) 1000m (bronze) overall			COLLALBO 5th 500m 6th 1000m 5th 500m 5th 1000m 5th overall					37th 500m 28th 1000m 35th 1500m	
2019–20	HEERENVEEN 5th 500m 5th 1000m 6th 1500m	HEERENVEEN (bronze) 500m 4th 1000m 8th 500m 6th 1000m 4th overall								12th 500m 11th 1000m 40th 1500m (gold) team sprint	
2020–21	HEERENVEEN 16th 500m 12th 1000m	HEERENVEEN 15th 500m 15th 1000m 15th 500m 11th 1000m 14th overall									

== World Cup overview ==
Season	500 meter										
2014–2015											
2015–2016											
2016–2017	7th(b)	6th(b)	7th(b)	–	–	9th(b)	6th(b)	16th	–	–	
2017–2018	19th	14th(b)	8th(b)	8th(b)	11th(b)	–	–	20th	18th	–	–
2018–2019	–	–	–	–	–	–	–	1st(b)	1st(b)	–	–
2019–2020	10th	14th	15th	11th	10th	11th	12th	11th			

Season	1000 meter						
2014–2015	12th	19th(b)	–	19th	–	–	–
2015–2016	12th	11th	11th	12th	–	13th	7th
2016–2017	10th	17th	–	18th	19th	10th	11th
2017–2018	12th(b)	3rd(b)	14th	–	–	25th	–
2018–2019	–	–	2nd(b)	–	1st(b)	–	
2019–2020	–	10th	3rd place, bronze medalist(s)	11th	11th		

Season	1500 meter					
2014–2015	–	–	–	2nd(b)	–	–
2015–2016	9th	13th	16th	11th	–	12th
2016–2017						
2017–2018						
2018–2019	–	–	–	–	16th	–
2019–2020	–	–	–	2nd(b)	−	

Season	Team sprint			
2014–2015				
2015–2016				
2016–2017	3rd place, bronze medalist(s)	3rd place, bronze medalist(s)	1st place, gold medalist(s)	
2017–2018	5th	–	4th	–
2018–2019				
2019–2020	–	2nd place, silver medalist(s)	–	1st place, gold medalist(s)

- GWC = Grand World Cup
- (b) = Division B
