= Isabel Grevelt =

Dutch speed skater (born 2002)

Personal information
- Nationality: Dutch
- Born: 11 April 2002 (age 24) Alkmaar, Netherlands
- Height: 1.81 m (5 ft 11 in)

Sport
- Country: Netherlands
- Sport: Speed skating
- Events: 500 m, 1000 m, 1500 m
- Turned pro: 2019
Medal record
Women's speed skating
Representing the Netherlands
European Championships
Bronze medal – third place	2026 Tomaszów Mazowiecki	500 m
Bronze medal – third place	2026 Tomaszów Mazowiecki	1000 m
Youth Olympic Games
Gold medal – first place	2020 Lausanne	500 m

Isabel Grevelt (born 11 April 2002) is a Dutch allround speed skater.

== Career ==
Grevelt won the 500 m gold medal at the 2020 Winter Youth Olympics which took place at Lake St. Moritz in St. Moritz, Switzerland .

On 30 October 2022 she qualified for the ISU Speed Skating World Cup series after finishing fifth at the 1000 m during the national qualification tournament. She made her World Cup debut in the 1000 m B-division at the Sørmarka Arena in Stavanger, Norway and won the race, resulting in a promotion to the A-division. At the second World Cup event, held at the Thialf in Heerenveen, she finished in third place, behind Jutta Leerdam and Miho Takagi, in a personal record of 1:14.54.

== Personal records ==
Personal records
Speed skating
Event	Result	Date	Location	Notes
500 m	37.56	28 December 2025	Heerenveen	
1000 m	1:13.14	22 November 2025	Calgary	
1500 m	1:54.97	29 December 2025	Heerenveen	
3000 m	4:28.31	2 March 2019	Heerenveen	
