= Janine Smit =

Dutch speed skater

Personal information
- Nationality: Dutch
- Born: 18 April 1991 (age 35) Heerenveen, Netherlands
- Height: 1.68 m (5 ft 6 in)
- Weight: 60 kg (132 lb)

Sport
- Country: Netherlands
- Sport: Speed skating
- Club: HCH Heerenveen
- Turned pro: 2009
Medal record
World Single Distances Championships
Gold medal – first place	2019 Inzell	Team sprint

Janine Smit (born 18 April 1991) is a Dutch speed skater who specializes in the sprint distances.

== Career ==
She took part in the second competition weekend of the 2018–19 ISU Speed Skating World Cup in Tomakomai, Japan where she finished first in the teams sprint with Letitia de Jong and Jutta Leerdam.

== Personal records ==
Personal records
Speed skating
Event	Result	Date	Location	Notes
500 m	38.22	29 December 2018	Thialf, Heerenveen	
1000 m	1:16.39	30 December 2018	Thialf, Heerenveen	
1500 m	2:02.09	28 February 2010	Inzell, Berlin	
3000 m	4:30.69	24 October 2009	Thialf, Heerenveen	
