= Isabelle van Elst =

Belgian speed skater (born 1998)

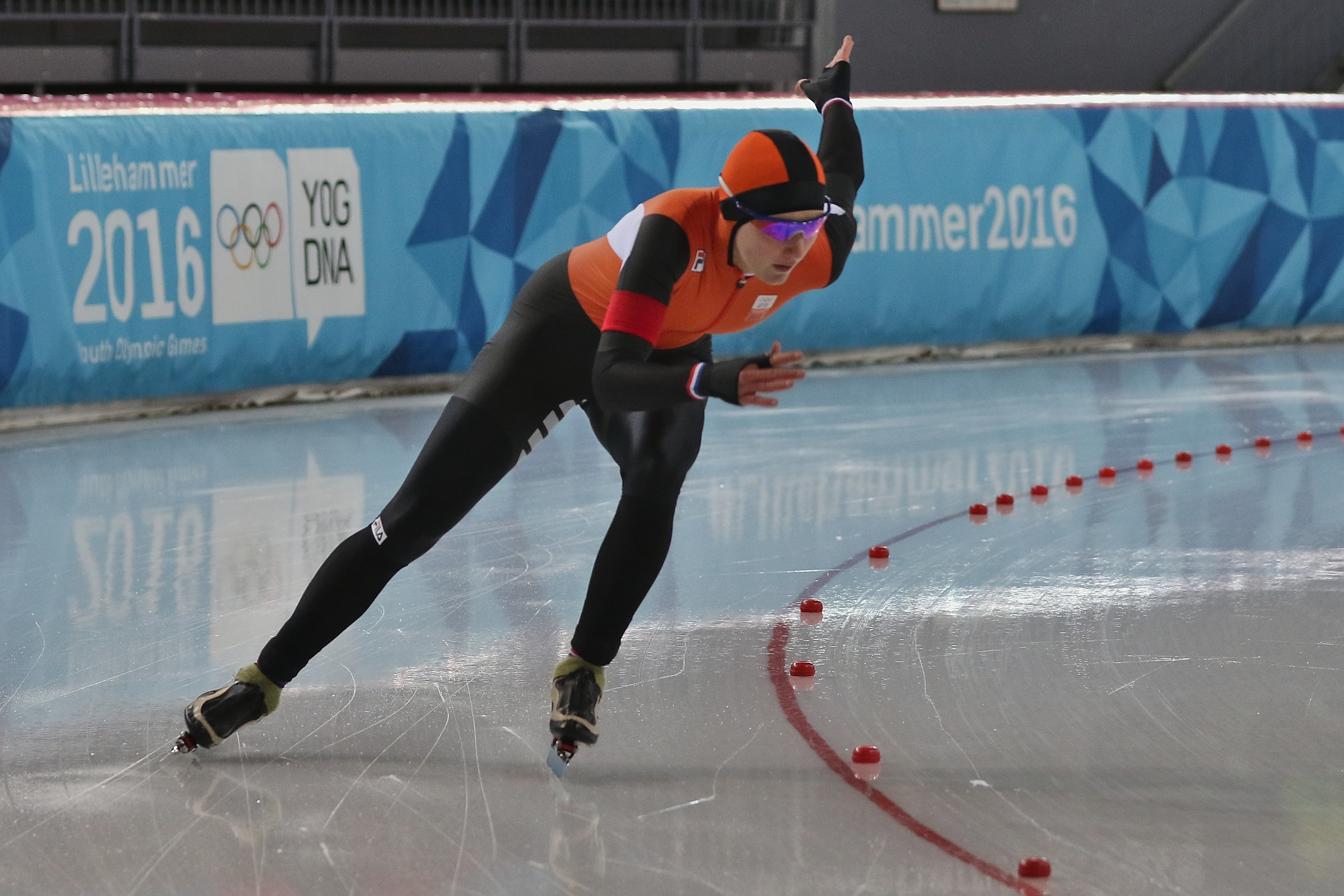
- van Elst in 2016

Personal information
- Born: 4 March 1998 (age 28) Bennebroek, Netherlands

Sport
- Country: Belgium
- Sport: Speed skating
Medal record
Women's speed skating
Representing Belgium
Event / 1st / 2nd / 3rd
European Championships
Silver medal – second place	2026 Tomaszow Masowiecki	Team pursuit
Silver medal – second place	2026 Tomaszow Masowiecki	Team sprint

Isabelle van Elst (born 4 March 1998) is a Belgian speed skater born in the Netherlands. Van Elst was part of the Belgian teams that won two silver medals at the 2026 European Speed Skating Championships. She represents Belgium at the 2026 Winter Olympics.

== Career ==
=== Netherlands ===
Van Elst was born in the Netherlands to a Dutch father and a Belgian mother. She started competitive speed skating in Haarlem, the Netherlands. She represented the Netherlands at the 2016 Winter Youth Olympics. Between 2017 and 2022 Van Elst participated in the KNSB Dutch Single Distance Championships. She was part of the Dutch team preparing for the 2022 World Sprint Speed Skating Championships but at the last moment the coach gave preference to Femke Kok. From that moment, Van Elst decided to represent Belgium.

=== Belgium ===
Since the 2022–23 season, Van Elst represents Belgium at the World Cup. She holds Belgian records at the 1000 and 1500 metres. She obtained silver medals with the Belgian team at the team pursuit and team sprint events of the 2026 European Championships. Van Elst represents Belgium at the 2026 Winter Olympics.
