= 2023–24 ISU Speed Skating World Cup – World Cup 1 =

Ice skating competition in Obihiro, Japan

2023–24 ISU Speed Skating World Cup 1
- Venue: Meiji Hokkaido-Tokachi Oval; Obihiro; Japan
- Dates: 10 — 12 November 2023

The first competition weekend of the 2023–24 ISU Speed Skating World Cup is being held at the Meiji Hokkaido-Tokachi Oval in Obihiro, Japan, from Friday, 10 November, until Sunday, 12 November 2023.

== Medal summary ==
=== Men's events ===
Event	Gold	Time	Silver	Time	Bronze	Time	Report
500 m (1)	Tatsuya Shinhama; Japan	34.52	Wataru Morishige; Japan	34.69	Yuma Murakami; Japan	34.82	
500 m (2)	Wataru Morishige; Japan	34.64	Tatsuya Shinhama; Japan	34.69	Jordan Stolz; United States	34.94	
1000 m	Masaya Yamada; Japan	1:08.35	Ning Zhongyan; China	1:08.54	Jordan Stolz; United States	1:08.78	
1500 m	Masaya Yamada; Japan	1:45.57	Jordan Stolz; United States	1:45.59	Ning Zhongyan; China	1:45.59	
5000 m	Patrick Roest; Netherlands	6:10.99; TR	Davide Ghiotto; Italy	6:12.90	Sander Eitrem; Norway	6:13.80	
Mass start^{A}	Bart Hoolwerf; Netherlands	60	Bart Swings; Belgium	41	Livio Wenger; Switzerland	20	
Team pursuit	Norway; Sander Eitrem; Peder Kongshaug; Sverre Lunde Pedersen	3:40.83	Italy; Andrea Giovannini; Davide Ghiotto; Michele Malfatti	3:42.78	United States; Ethan Cepuran; Emery Lehman; Casey Dawson	3:43.57	

^{A} In mass start, race points are accumulated during the race based on results of the intermediate sprints and the final sprint. The skater with most race points is the winner.

=== Women's events ===
Event	Gold	Time	Silver	Time	Bronze	Time	Report
500 m (1)	Kimi Goetz; United States	37.82	Erin Jackson; United States	37.89	Femke Kok; Netherlands	37.93	
500 m (2)	Femke Kok; Netherlands	37.89	Jutta Leerdam; Netherlands	38.00	Kimi Goetz; United States	38.13	
1000 m	Jutta Leerdam; Netherlands	1:14.57	Miho Takagi; Japan	1:14.68	Kimi Goetz; United States	1:14.75	
1500 m	Miho Takagi; Japan	1:54.54	Antoinette Rijpma-de Jong; Netherlands	1:56.23	Kimi Goetz; United States	1:56.56	
3000 m	Ragne Wiklund; Norway	4:01.88; TR	Momoka Horikawa; Japan	4:03.42	Antoinette Rijpma-de Jong; Netherlands	4:03.71	
Mass start^{A}	Ivanie Blondin; Canada	60	Esther Kiel; Netherlands	40	Mia Kilburg-Manganello; United States	20	
Team pursuit	Japan; Momoka Horikawa; Miho Takagi; Ayano Sato	2:58.03	Canada; Ivanie Blondin; Isabelle Weidemann; Valérie Maltais	2:59.25	Netherlands; Joy Beune; Esther Kiel; Reina Anema	3:01.29	

^{A} In mass start, race points are accumulated during the race based on results of the intermediate sprints and the final sprint. The skater with most race points is the winner.

=== Mixed events ===
Event	Gold	Time	Silver	Time	Bronze	Time	Report
Mixed gender relay	Netherlands; Femke Kok; Wesly Dijs	2:55.53; WR; TR	Poland; Karolina Bosiek; Damian Żurek	2:56.12	United States; Kimi Goetz; Conor McDermott-Mostowy	2:57.63	

== Results ==
=== Men's events ===
==== 1st 500 m ====
The race started on 10 November 2023 at 15:00.

Rank	Pair	Lane	Name	Country	Time	Diff
1st place, gold medalist(s)	9	i	Tatsuya Shinhama	Japan	34.52	
2nd place, silver medalist(s)	7	i	Wataru Morishige	Japan	34.69	+0.28
3rd place, bronze medalist(s)	9	o	Yuma Murakami	Japan	34.82	+0.30
4	4	i	Hein Otterspeer	Netherlands	34.89	+0.37
5	5	i	Takuya Morimoto	Japan	34.90	+0.38
6	10	o	Jordan Stolz	United States	34.91	+0.39
7	8	i	Laurent Dubreuil	Canada	35.08	+0.56
8	6	o	Kim Jun-ho	South Korea	35.18	+0.66
9	3	i	Nil Llop	Spain	35.19	+0.67
10	3	o	Marek Kania	Poland	35.20	+0.68
11	1	i	Cha Min-kyu	South Korea	35.27	+0.75
12	2	i	David Bosa	Italy	35.28	+0.76
13	1	o	Bjørn Magnussen	Norway	35.31	+0.79
14	2	o	Piotr Michalski	Poland	35.41	+0.89
15	8	o	Merijn Scheperkamp	Netherlands	35.44	+0.92
16	5	o	Damian Żurek	Poland	35.46	+0.94
17	4	o	Yevgeniy Koshkin	Kazakhstan	35.49	+0.97
18	7	o	Kai Verbij	Netherlands	35.63	+1.11
19	6	i	Joshua Telizyn	Canada	35.77	+1.25
20	10	i	Sebastian Diniz	Netherlands	1:00.33	+25.81

==== 2nd 500 m ====
The race started on 12 November 2023 at 14:30.

Rank	Pair	Lane	Name	Country	Time	Diff
1st place, gold medalist(s)	10	i	Wataru Morishige	Japan	34.64	
2nd place, silver medalist(s)	10	o	Tatsuya Shinhama	Japan	34.69	+0.05
3rd place, bronze medalist(s)	9	i	Jordan Stolz	United States	34.94	+0.30
4	4	i	Yudai Yamamoto	Japan	34.94	+0.30
5	9	o	Yuma Murakami	Japan	34.96	+0.32
6	7	i	Laurent Dubreuil	Canada	35.03	+0.39
7	1	o	Janno Botman	Netherlands	35.08	+0.44
8	8	o	Hein Otterspeer	Netherlands	35.08	+0.44
9	8	i	Takuya Morimoto	Japan	35.20	+0.56
10	4	o	Bjørn Magnussen	Norway	35.21	+0.57
11	3	o	Merijn Scheperkamp	Netherlands	35.22	+0.58
12	2	o	Cooper McLeod	United States	35.32	+0.68
13	6	i	Nil Llop	Spain	35.33	+0.69
14	5	o	David Bosa	Italy	35.36	+0.72
15	7	o	Kim Jun-ho	South Korea	35.39	+0.75
16	3	i	Piotr Michalski	Poland	35.44	+0.80
17	5	i	Cha Min-kyu	South Korea	35.53	+0.89
18	6	o	Marek Kania	Poland	35.53	+0.89
19	1	i	Yevgeniy Koshkin	Kazakhstan	35.64	+1.00
20	2	i	Damian Żurek	Poland	35.84	+1.20

==== 1000 m ====
The race started on 10 November 2023 at 16:14.

Rank	Pair	Lane	Name	Country	Time	Diff
1st place, gold medalist(s)	3	i	Masaya Yamada	Japan	1:08.35	
2nd place, silver medalist(s)	5	i	Ning Zhongyan	China	1:08.54	+0.19
3rd place, bronze medalist(s)	10	o	Jordan Stolz	United States	1:08.78	+0.43
4	7	i	Kjeld Nuis	Netherlands	1:08.84	+0.49
5	4	o	David Bosa	Italy	1:08.91	+0.56
6	3	o	Taiyo Nonomura	Japan	1:08.97	+0.62
7	4	i	Moritz Klein	Germany	1:08.98	+0.63
8	6	o	Kazuya Yamada	Japan	1:09.05	+0.70
9	5	o	Ryota Kojima	Japan	1:09.21	+0.86
10	7	o	Jenning de Boo	Netherlands	1:09.31	+0.96
11	6	i	Vincent De Haître	Canada	1:09.31	+0.96
12	9	o	Tim Prins	Netherlands	1:09.32	+0.97
13	8	i	Cooper McLeod	United States	1:09.39	+1.04
14	1	o	Håvard Holmefjord Lorentzen	Norway	1:09.45	+1.10
15	2	i	Damian Żurek	Poland	1:09.53	+1.18
16	8	o	Connor Howe	Canada	1:09.89	+1.54
17	2	o	Marten Liiv	Estonia	1:10.00	+1.65
18	9	i	Laurent Dubreuil	Canada	1:10.26	+1.91
19	1	i	Piotr Michalski	Poland	1:10.70	+2.35
20	10	i	Tijmen Snel	Netherlands	1:10.78	+2.43

==== 1500 m ====
The race started on 11 November 2023 at 15:00.

Rank	Pair	Lane	Name	Country	Time	Diff
1st place, gold medalist(s)	5	i	Masaya Yamada	Japan	1:45.57	
2nd place, silver medalist(s)	10	o	Jordan Stolz	United States	1:45.59	+0.02
3rd place, bronze medalist(s)	1	i	Ning Zhongyan	China	1:45.59	+0.02
4	7	o	Seitaro Ichinohe	Japan	1:45.63	+0.06
5	5	o	Taiyo Nonomura	Japan	1:45.70	+0.13
6	9	o	Kjeld Nuis	Netherlands	1:45.76	+0.19
7	3	i	Peder Kongshaug	Norway	1:45.84	+0.27
8	8	o	Wesly Dijs	Netherlands	1:45.88	+0.31
9	3	o	Sander Eitrem	Norway	1:46.06	+0.49
10	6	o	Kazuya Yamada	Japan	1:46.15	+0.58
11	6	i	Thomas Krol	Netherlands	1:46.29	+0.72
12	10	i	Patrick Roest	Netherlands	1:46.32	+0.75
13	4	o	Hallgeir Engebråten	Norway	1:46.40	+0.83
14	7	i	David La Rue	Canada	1:46.69	+1.12
15	1	o	Bart Swings	Belgium	1:46.93	+1.36
16	4	i	Alessio Trentini	Italy	1:47.60	+2.03
17	2	i	Allan Dahl Johansson	Norway	1:47.68	+2.11
18	8	i	Antoine Gélinas-Beaulieu	Canada	1:47.72	+2.15
19	9	i	Connor Howe	Canada	1:47.78	+2.21
20	2	o	Dmitriy Morozov	Kazakhstan	1:49.15	+3.58

==== 5000 m ====
The race started on 12 November 2023 at 16:05.

Rank	Pair	Lane	Name	Country	Time	Diff
1st place, gold medalist(s)	7	o	Patrick Roest	Netherlands	6:10.99; TR	
2nd place, silver medalist(s)	7	i	Davide Ghiotto	Italy	6:12.90	+1.91
3rd place, bronze medalist(s)	4	o	Sander Eitrem	Norway	6:13.80	+2.81
4	5	i	Ted-Jan Bloemen	Canada	6:18.29	+7.30
5	1	i	Sverre Lunde Pedersen	Norway	6:19.42	+8.43
6	5	o	Michele Malfatti	Italy	6:19.70	+8.71
7	1	o	Bart Swings	Belgium	6:21.14	+10.15
8	2	i	Seitaro Ichinohe	Japan	6:21.21	+10.22
9	3	o	Hallgeir Engebråten	Norway	6:21.86	+10.87
10	6	o	Casey Dawson	United States	6:23.23	+12.24
11	6	i	Jesse Speijers	Netherlands	6:23.70	+12.71
12	8	i	Marcel Bosker	Netherlands	6:23.87	+12.88
13	8	o	Chris Huizinga	Netherlands	6:24.98	+13.99
14	4	i	Jordan Stolz	United States	6:25.44	+14.45
15	2	o	Riku Tsuchiya	Japan	6:27.85	+16.86
16	3	i	Ryosuke Tsuchiya	Japan	6:28.21	+17.22

==== Mass start ====
The race started on 10 November 2023 at 17:24.

Rank	Name	Country	Points	Time
1st place, gold medalist(s)	Bart Hoolwerf	Netherlands	60	7:45.78
2nd place, silver medalist(s)	Bart Swings	Belgium	41	7:45.80
3rd place, bronze medalist(s)	Livio Wenger	Switzerland	20	7:45.81
4	Antoine Gélinas-Beaulieu	Canada	10	7:46.22
5	Andrea Giovannini	Italy	9	7:46.33
6	Lee Seung-hoon	South Korea	3	7:46.56
7	Ethan Cepuran	United States	3	7:52.65
8	Viktor Hald Thorup	Denmark	3	7:52.90
9	Daniele Di Stefano	Italy	2	7:48.48
10	Gabriel Odor	Austria	2	7:54.43
11	Conor McDermott-Mostowy	United States	2	7:55.86
12	Timothy Loubineaud	France	1	7:51.47
13	Marcel Bosker	Netherlands	1	7:55.29
14	Chung Jae-won	South Korea		7:47.57
15	Felix Maly	Germany		7:48.01
16	Kota Kikuchi	Japan		7:48.38
17	Felix Rhijnen	Germany		7:48.49
18	Philip Due Schmidt	Denmark		7:56.36
19	Vitaliy Chshigolev	Kazakhstan		8:09.98
20	Connor Howe	Canada		8:32.71

==== Team pursuit ====
The race started on 11 November 2023 at 16:37.

Rank	Pair	Lane	Country	Time	Diff
1st place, gold medalist(s)	3	c	Norway; Sander Eitrem; Peder Kongshaug; Sverre Lunde Pedersen	3:40.83	
2nd place, silver medalist(s)	1	s	Italy; Andrea Giovannini; Davide Ghiotto; Michele Malfatti	3:42.78	+1.95
3rd place, bronze medalist(s)	3	s	United States; Ethan Cepuran; Emery Lehman; Casey Dawson	3:43.57	+2.74
4	1	c	Japan; Seitaro Ichinohe; Shomu Sasaki; Riku Tsuchiya	3:44.03	+3.20
5	2	s	Netherlands; Marcel Bosker; Louis Hollaar; Bart Hoolwerf	3:45.29	+4.46
6	2	c	Canada; Antoine Gélinas-Beaulieu; Connor Howe; David La Rue	3:45.29	+4.46

=== Women's events ===
==== 1st 500 m ====
The race started on 10 November 2023 at 14:30.

Rank	Pair	Lane	Name	Country	Time	Diff
1st place, gold medalist(s)	10	o	Kimi Goetz	United States	37.82	
2nd place, silver medalist(s)	8	o	Erin Jackson	United States	37.89	+0.07
3rd place, bronze medalist(s)	9	i	Femke Kok	Netherlands	37.93	+0.11
4	5	o	Yukino Yoshida	Japan	37.96	+0.14
5	9	o	Kim Min-sun	South Korea	37.99	+0.17
6	5	i	Kurumi Inagawa	Japan	38.13	+0.31
7	3	o	Rio Yamada	Japan	38.19	+0.37
8	7	o	Marrit Fledderus	Netherlands	38.23	+0.41
9	10	i	Naomi Verkerk	Netherlands	38.43	+0.61
10	8	i	Jutta Leerdam	Netherlands	38.43	+0.61
11	3	i	Lee Nah-yun	South Korea	38.47	+0.65
12	2	o	Alina Dauranova	Kazakhstan	38.59	+0.77
12	6	o	Vanessa Herzog	Austria	38.59	+0.77
14	4	i	Karolina Bosiek	Poland	38.61	+0.79
15	7	i	Dione Voskamp	Netherlands	38.65	+0.83
16	4	o	Brooklyn McDougall	Canada	38.86	+1.04
17	2	i	Kako Yamane	Japan	38.93	+1.11
18	6	i	Carolina Hiller	Canada	39.15	+1.33
19	1	o	Julie Nistad Samsonsen	Norway	39.29	+1.47
20	1	i	Lina Zhang	China	39.38	+1.56

==== 2nd 500 m ====
The race started on 11 November 2023 at 14:30.

Rank	Pair	Lane	Name	Country	Time	Diff
1st place, gold medalist(s)	9	i	Femke Kok	Netherlands	37.89	
2nd place, silver medalist(s)	6	o	Jutta Leerdam	Netherlands	38.00	+0.11
3rd place, bronze medalist(s)	8	o	Kimi Goetz	United States	38.13	+0.24
4	10	o	Erin Jackson	United States	38.15	+0.26
5	7	o	Marrit Fledderus	Netherlands	38.22	+0.33
6	9	o	Kurumi Inagawa	Japan	38.31	+0.42
7	10	i	Kim Min-sun	South Korea	38.34	+0.45
8	4	o	Tian Ruining	China	38.41	+0.52
9	8	i	Yukino Yoshida	Japan	38.56	+0.67
10	5	o	Vanessa Herzog	Austria	38.59	+0.70
11	7	i	Rio Yamada	Japan	38.72	+0.83
12	1	o	Andżelika Wójcik	Poland	38.73	+0.84
13	2	i	Kako Yamane	Japan	38.78	+0.89
14	5	i	Lee Nah-yun	South Korea	38.79	+0.90
15	6	i	Naomi Verkerk	Netherlands	38.82	+0.93
16	3	o	Dione Voskamp	Netherlands	38.83	+0.94
17	3	i	Karolina Bosiek	Poland	38.86	+0.97
18	4	i	Alina Dauranova	Kazakhstan	38.91	+1.02
19	1	i	Sarah Warren	United States	38.97	+1.08
20	2	o	Brooklyn McDougall	Canada	39.31	+1.42

==== 1000 m ====
The race started on 10 November 2023 at 15:39.

Rank	Pair	Lane	Name	Country	Time	Diff
1st place, gold medalist(s)	8	o	Jutta Leerdam	Netherlands	1:14.57	
2nd place, silver medalist(s)	10	i	Miho Takagi	Japan	1:14.68	+0.11
3rd place, bronze medalist(s)	9	o	Kimi Goetz	United States	1:14.75	+0.18
4	9	i	Femke Kok	Netherlands	1:15.22	+0.65
5	6	o	Li Qishi	China	1:15.29	+0.72
6	8	i	Brittany Bowe	United States	1:15.35	+0.78
7	5	i	Ivanie Blondin	Canada	1:15.91	+1.34
8	6	i	Han Mei	China	1:16.22	+1.65
9	2	i	Ayano Sato	Japan	1:16.53	+1.96
10	7	i	Marrit Fledderus	Netherlands	1:16.55	+1.98
11	4	i	Karolina Bosiek	Poland	1:16.55	+1.98
12	2	o	Sumire Kikuchi	Japan	1:16.65	+2.08
13	3	o	Vanessa Herzog	Austria	1:17.18	+2.61
14	4	o	Ellia Smeding	United Kingdom	1:17.42	+2.85
15	1	o	Yekaterina Aydova	Kazakhstan	1:17.48	+2.91
16	10	o	Antoinette Rijpma-de Jong	Netherlands	1:17.53	+2.96
17	5	o	Kim Min-sun	South Korea	1:17.54	+2.97
18	1	i	Lee Nah-yun	South Korea	1:18.37	+3.80
19	7	o	Helga Drost	Netherlands	1:18.82	+4.25
20	3	i	Erin Jackson	United States	1:19.95	+5.38

==== 1500 m ====
The race started on 11 November 2023 at 15:46.

Rank	Pair	Lane	Name	Country	Time	Diff
1st place, gold medalist(s)	9	o	Miho Takagi	Japan	1:54.54	
2nd place, silver medalist(s)	10	i	Antoinette Rijpma-de Jong	Netherlands	1:56.23	+1.69
3rd place, bronze medalist(s)	7	i	Kimi Goetz	United States	1:56.56	+2.02
4	5	o	Li Qishi	China	1:56.80	+2.26
5	7	o	Joy Beune	Netherlands	1:56.88	+2.34
6	6	i	Momoka Horikawa	Japan	1:57.35	+2.81
7	8	i	Brittany Bowe	United States	1:57.41	+2.87
8	9	i	Han Mei	China	1:57.42	+2.88
9	3	i	Ragne Wiklund	Norway	1:57.43	+2.89
10	8	o	Valérie Maltais	Canada	1:57.76	+3.22
11	1	o	Ivanie Blondin	Canada	1:58.31	+3.77
12	4	o	Ayano Sato	Japan	1:58.45	+3.91
13	4	i	Mia Kilburg-Manganello	United States	1:59.07	+4.53
14	6	o	Isabelle Weidemann	Canada	1:59.22	+4.68
15	2	i	Kaitlyn McGregor	Switzerland	1:59.31	+4.77
16	10	o	Esther Kiel	Netherlands	1:59.54	+5.00
17	3	o	Karolina Bosiek	Poland	2:00.73	+6.19
18	2	o	Isabelle van Elst	Belgium	2:01.23	+6.69
19	5	i	Nadezhda Morozova	Kazakhstan	2:01.52	+6.98
			Yekaterina Aydova	Kazakhstan	Withdrawn	

==== 3000 m ====
The race started on 12 November 2023 at 15:05.

Rank	Pair	Lane	Name	Country	Time	Diff
1st place, gold medalist(s)	4	i	Ragne Wiklund	Norway	4:01.88; TR	
2nd place, silver medalist(s)	5	i	Momoka Horikawa	Japan	4:03.42	+1.54
3rd place, bronze medalist(s)	6	o	Antoinette Rijpma-de Jong	Netherlands	4:03.71	+1.83
4	6	i	Joy Beune	Netherlands	4:03.89	+2.01
5	4	o	Martina Sábliková	Czech Republic	4:04.60	+2.72
6	5	o	Ivanie Blondin	Canada	4:05.68	+3.80
7	7	o	Valérie Maltais	Canada	4:06.18	+4.30
8	8	i	Sanne In 't Hof	Netherlands	4:07.72	+5.84
9	8	o	Isabelle Weidemann	Canada	4:08.56	+6.68
10	1	o	Han Mei	China	4:10.16	+8.28
11	7	i	Esther Kiel	Netherlands	4:11.43	+9.55
12	3	o	Yang Binyu	China	4:11.48	+9.60
13	3	i	Magdalena Czyszczoń	Poland	4:16.76	+14.88
14	2	o	Yuna Onodera	Japan	4:17.52	+15.64
15	1	i	Michelle Uhrig	Germany	4:20.99	+19.11
	2	i	Nadezhda Morozova	Kazakhstan	Withdrawn	

==== Mass start ====
The race started on 10 November 2023 at 17:24.

Rank	Name	Country	Points	Time
1st place, gold medalist(s)	Ivanie Blondin	Canada	60	8:25.11
2nd place, silver medalist(s)	Esther Kiel	Netherlands	40	8:25.45
3rd place, bronze medalist(s)	Mia Kilburg-Manganello	United States	20	8:25.58
4	Valérie Maltais	Canada	13	8:26.05
5	Park Ji-woo	South Korea	6	8:27.69
6	Kaitlyn McGregor	Switzerland	4	8:34.83
7	Ramona Härdi	Switzerland	4	8:34.89
8	Josephine Heimerl	Germany	3	8:27.72
9	Michelle Uhrig	Germany	3	8:28.51
10	Sandrine Tas	Belgium	2	8:27.94
11	Laura Lorenzato	Italy	2	8:32.06
12	Jin Wenjing	China		8:27.78
13	Giorgia Birkeland	United States		8:27.80
14	Kim Bo-reum	South Korea		8:28.04
15	Chen Aoyu	China		8:28.53
16	Sumire Kikuchi	Japan		8:28.54
17	Reina Anema	Netherlands		8:29.31
18	Magdalena Czyszczoń	Poland		8:30.25
19	Lucie Korvasová	Czech Republic		8:30.58
20	Zuzana Kuršová	Czech Republic		8:30.71
21	Momoka Horikawa	Japan		8:47.12
22	Olga Piotrowska	Poland		7:30.04

==== Team pursuit ====
The race started on 11 November 2023 at 17:06.

Rank	Pair	Lane	Country	Time	Diff
1st place, gold medalist(s)	4	s	Japan; Momoka Horikawa; Miho Takagi; Ayano Sato	2:58.03	
2nd place, silver medalist(s)	5	s	Canada; Ivanie Blondin; Isabelle Weidemann; Valérie Maltais	2:59.25	+1.22
3rd place, bronze medalist(s)	5	c	Netherlands; Joy Beune; Esther Kiel; Reina Anema	3:01.29	+3.26
4	3	s	Poland; Karolina Bosiek; Magdalena Czyszczoń; Natalia Jabrzyk	3:04.59	+6.56
5	2	s	China; Jin Wenjing; Chen Aoyu; Han Mei	3:05.37	+7.34
6	2	c	Switzerland; Kaitlyn McGregor; Ramone Härdi; Jasmin Güntert	3:05.65	+7.62
7	4	c	United States; Mia Kilburg-Manganello; Greta Myers; Giorgia Birkeland	3:06.50	+8.47
8	3	c	Germany; Josephine Schlörb; Josephine Heimerl; Michelle Uhrig	3:08.54	+10.51
9	1	s	South Korea; Park Chae-won; Park Ji-woo; Kang Soo-min	3:16.90	+18.87
10	1	c	Italy; Laura Lorenzato; Serena Pergher; Veronica Luciani	3:23.50	+25.47

=== Mixed events ===
==== Mixed relay ====
The race started on 12 November 2023 at 17:19.

Rank	Heat	Country	Time	Diff
1st place, gold medalist(s)	2	Netherlands; Wesly Dijs; Femke Kok	2:55.53; WR; TR	
2nd place, silver medalist(s)	2	Poland; Damian Żurek; Karolina Bosiek	2:56.12	+0.59
3rd place, bronze medalist(s)	3	United States; Conor McDermott-Mostowy; Kimi Goetz	2:57.63	+2.10
4	3	Italy; Riccardo Lorello; Serena Pergher	2:58.06	+2.53
5	3	Norway; Allan Dahl Johansson; Martine Ripsrud	2:58.28	+2.75
6	1	China; Jin Wenjing; Yeerken Teenbuli	3:02.69	+7.16
7	2	Japan; Koutaro Kasahara; Yuka Takahashi	3:06.21	+10.68
8	1	Czech Republic; Jakub Koči; Zuzana Kuršová	3:10.18	+14.65
9	3	Germany; Hendrik Dombek; Anna Ostlender	3:24.15	+28.62
	2	Canada; Antoine Gélinas-Beaulieu; Ivanie Blondin	Disqualified	
	1	South Korea; Yang Ho-jun; Lee Nah-yun	Disqualified	
