= Speed skating at the 2022 Winter Olympics – Women's 500 metres =

Women's 500 metres at the XXIV Olympic Winter Games
- Speed skating
- Venue: National Speed Skating Oval, Beijing
- Date: 13 February 2022
- Competitors: 30 from 17 nations
- Winning time: 37.04

Medalists
1st place, gold medalist(s)		Erin Jackson	United States
2nd place, silver medalist(s)		Miho Takagi	Japan
3rd place, bronze medalist(s)		Angelina Golikova	ROC

The women's 500 m competition in speed skating at the 2022 Winter Olympics was held on 13 February, at the National Speed Skating Oval ("Ice Ribbon") in Beijing. Erin Jackson of the United States became the Olympic champion, winning her first Olympic medal. She was also the first female Black athlete to medal in speed skating. Miho Takagi of Japan won the silver medal, and Angelina Golikova, representing the Russian Olympic committee, won bronze, also her first Olympic medal.

The defending champion and the Olympic record holder was Nao Kodaira. The 2018 silver medalist, Lee Sang-hwa, retired from competitions. She was still the world record holder during the Olympics. The bronze medalist, Karolína Erbanová, retired as well. Golikova was the 2021 World Single Distances champion at the 500 m distance. Femke Kok and Olga Fatkulina were the silver and bronze medalist, respectively. Erin Jackson was leading the 2021–22 ISU Speed Skating World Cup at the 500 m distance with eight events completed before the Olympics, followed by Golikova and Kodaira. Golikova skated the season best time, 36.66 in Calgary on 11 December 2021.

Takagi in pair 4 became the early leader with 37.12. Vanessa Herzog in the same pair was 0:16 behind. In pair 13, Golikova skated 37.21, provisionally second time. In pair 14, Jackson improved Takagi's time, taking the lead with one pair to go and shifting Herzog off the podium. The last pair did not alter the medal allocation.

== Qualification ==
A total of 30 entry quotas were available for the event, with a maximum of three athletes per NOC. The first 20 athletes qualified through their performance at the 2021–22 ISU Speed Skating World Cup, while the last ten earned quotas by having the best times among athletes not already qualified. A country could only earn the maximum three spots through the World Cup rankings.

The qualification time for the event (39.50) was released on July 1, 2021, and was unchanged from 2018. Skaters had the time period of July 1, 2021 – January 16, 2022 to achieve qualification times at valid International Skating Union (ISU) events.

== Records ==
Prior to this competition, the existing world, Olympic and track records were as follows.

World record	Lee Sang-hwa (KOR)	36.36	Salt Lake City, United States	16 November 2013
Olympic record	Nao Kodaira (JPN)	36.94	Gangneung, South Korea	18 February 2018
Track record	Tian Ruining (CHN)	38.38		7 April 2021

No new records were established during the competition.

== Results ==
The races were started at 21:56.

Rank	Pair	Lane	Name	Country	Time	Time behind	Notes
1st place, gold medalist(s)	14	I	Erin Jackson	United States	37.04	—	TR
2nd place, silver medalist(s)	4	O	Miho Takagi	Japan	37.12	+0.08	
3rd place, bronze medalist(s)	13	I	Angelina Golikova	ROC	37.21	+0.17	
4	4	I	Vanessa Herzog	Austria	37.28	+0.24	
5	7	O	Jutta Leerdam	Netherlands	37.34	+0.30	
6	9	I	Femke Kok	Netherlands	37.39	+0.35	
7	10	O	Kim Min-sun	South Korea	37.60	+0.56	
8	11	O	Daria Kachanova	ROC	37.65	+0.61	
9	14	O	Kaja Ziomek	Poland	37.70	+0.66	
10	15	I	Olga Fatkulina	ROC	37.76	+0.72	
11	15	O	Andżelika Wójcik	Poland	37.78	+0.74	
12	7	I	Jin Jingzhu	China	37.88	+0.84	
13	8	O	Michelle de Jong	Netherlands	37.97	+0.93	
14	12	I	Tian Ruining	China	37.982	+0.94	
15	10	I	Arisa Go	Japan	37.983	+0.94	
16	5	O	Brittany Bowe	United States	38.04	+1.00	
17	13	O	Nao Kodaira	Japan	38.09	+1.05	
18	11	I	Kimi Goetz	United States	38.25	+1.21	
19	12	O	Hanna Nifantava	Belarus	38.30	+1.26	
20	6	I	Yekaterina Aidova	Kazakhstan	38.54	+1.50	
21	5	I	Marsha Hudey	Canada	38.79	+1.75	
22	9	O	Brooklyn McDougall	Canada	38.84	+1.80	
23	3	O	Martine Ripsrud	Norway	38.95	+1.91	
24	2	O	Julie Nistad Samsonsen	Norway	39.02	+1.98	
25	3	I	Nikola Zdráhalová	Czech Republic	39.18	+2.14	
26	6	O	Huang Yu-ting	Chinese Taipei	39.23	+2.19	
27	8	I	Heather McLean	Canada	39.31	+2.27	
28	2	I	Sandrine Tas	Belgium	39.37	+2.33	
29	1	I	Mihaela Hogaş	Romania	39.45	+2.41	
30	1	O	María Victoria Rodríguez	Argentina	39.70	+2.66	
