= 2024 European Speed Skating Championships – Women's 1000 metres =

Women's 1000 metres at the 2024 European Speed Skating Championships
- Venue: Thialf
- Location: Heerenveen, Netherlands
- Dates: 7 January
- Competitors: 19 from 10 nations
- Winning time: 1:14.45

Medalists
gold medal	Jutta Leerdam	Netherlands
silver medal	Antoinette Rijpma-de Jong	Netherlands
bronze medal	Vanessa Herzog	Austria

The women's 1000 metres competition at the 2024 European Speed Skating Championships was held on 7 January 2024.

== Results ==
The race was started at 15:31.

Rank	Pair	Lane	Name	Country	Time	Diff
1st place, gold medalist(s)	8	i	Jutta Leerdam	Netherlands	1:14.45	
2nd place, silver medalist(s)	8	o	Antoinette Rijpma-de Jong	Netherlands	1:15.04	+0.59
3rd place, bronze medalist(s)	10	o	Vanessa Herzog	Austria	1:15.74	+1.29
4	4	o	Isabel Grevelt	Netherlands	1:15.94	+1.49
5	9	i	Karolina Bosiek	Poland	1:16.80	+2.35
6	9	o	Ellia Smeding	Great Britain	1:17.18	+2.73
7	6	o	Lea Sophie Scholz	Germany	1:17.65	+3.20
8	10	i	Isabelle van Elst	Belgium	1:17.67	+3.22
9	5	i	Anna Ostlender	Germany	1:17.73	+3.28
10	7	i	Iga Wojtasik	Poland	1:17.84	+3.39
11	5	o	Martine Ripsrud	Norway	1:17.90	+3.45
12	3	o	Julie Nistad Samsonsen	Norway	1:18.72	+4.27
13	3	i	Fran Vanhoutte	Belgium	1:18.88	+4.43
14	7	o	Natalia Jabrzyk	Poland	1:18.99	+4.54
15	1	i	Aurora Grinden Løvås	Norway	1:19.17	+4.72
16	2	o	Mihaela Hogaș	Romania	1:19.21	+4.76
17	6	i	Serena Pergher	Italy	1:19.23	+4.78
18	2	i	Bianca Stănică	Romania	1:19.87	+5.42
19	4	i	Luisa María González	Spain	1:21.34	+6.89
