= 2020 European Speed Skating Championships – Women's 1000 metres =

Women's 1000 metres at the 2020 European Speed Skating Championships
- Venue: Thialf
- Location: Heerenveen, Netherlands
- Dates: 12 January
- Competitors: 19 from 11 nations
- Winning time: 1:13.67

Medalists
gold medal	Jutta Leerdam	Netherlands
silver medal	Daria Kachanova	Russia
bronze medal	Yekaterina Shikhova	Russia

The women's 1000 metres competition at the 2020 European Speed Skating Championships was held on 12 January 2020.

== Results ==
The race was started at 15:14.

Rank	Pair	Lane	Name	Country	Time	Diff
1st place, gold medalist(s)	8	i	Jutta Leerdam	Netherlands	1:13.67	
2nd place, silver medalist(s)	8	o	Daria Kachanova	Russia	1:13.90	+0.23
3rd place, bronze medalist(s)	6	i	Yekaterina Shikhova	Russia	1:14.48	+0.81
4	7	i	Letitia de Jong	Netherlands	1:14.64	+0.97
5	10	i	Ireen Wüst	Netherlands	1:14.81	+1.14
6	9	o	Olga Fatkulina	Russia	1:15.20	+1.53
7	9	i	Vanessa Herzog	Austria	1:15.32	+1.65
8	5	i	Kaja Ziomek	Poland	1:16.53	+2.86
9	7	o	Nikola Zdráhalová	Czech Republic	1:16.57	+2.90
10	10	o	Natalia Czerwonka	Poland	1:16.70	+3.03
11	5	o	Ida Njåtun	Norway	1:16.92	+3.25
12	6	o	Hege Bøkko	Norway	1:17.71	+4.04
13	3	o	Hanna Nifantava	Belarus	1:18.31	+4.64
14	4	i	Ellia Smeding	Great Britain	1:18.50	+4.83
15	1	o	Lea Sophie Scholz	Germany	1:19.24	+5.57
16	4	o	Andżelika Wójcik	Poland	1:19.24	+5.57
17	2	i	Stien Vanhoutte	Belgium	1:19.43	+5.76
18	3	i	Julie Nistad Samsonsen	Norway	1:19.74	+6.07
19	2	o	Mihaela Hogaş	Romania	1:20.26	+6.59
	1	i	Yeugeniya Vorobyova	Belarus	Did not start	
