= 2025 European Speed Skating Championships =

Speed skating event in the Netherlands

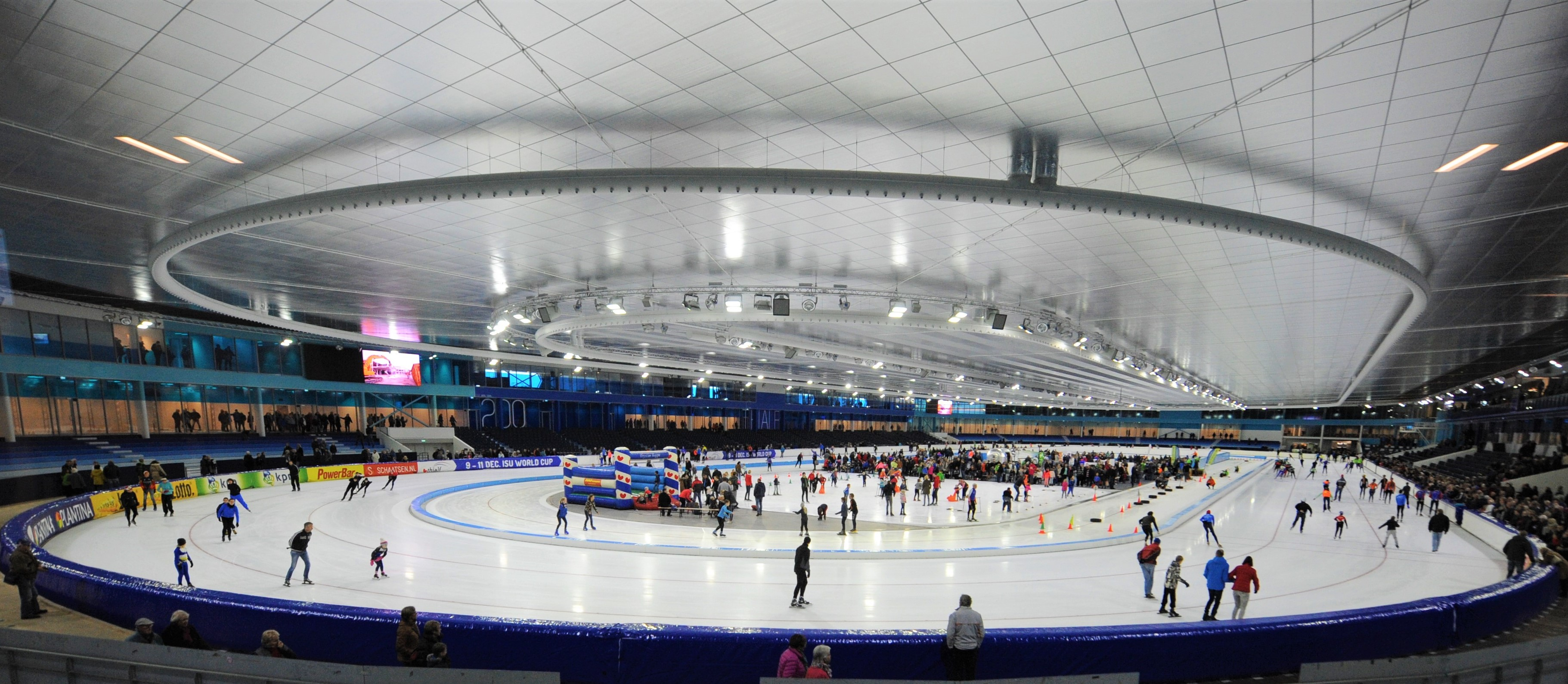
- Venue: Thialf, Heerenveen, Netherlands
- Dates: 10–12 January
- Competitors: 74 from 14 nations

Medalist men
1st place, gold medalist(s)		Sander Eitrem	NOR
1st place, gold medalist(s)		Jenning de Boo	NED
2nd place, silver medalist(s)		Peder Kongshaug	NOR
2nd place, silver medalist(s)		Merijn Scheperkamp	NED
3rd place, bronze medalist(s)		Beau Snellink	NED
3rd place, bronze medalist(s)		Tim Prins	NED

Medalist women
1st place, gold medalist(s)		Antoinette Rijpma-de Jong	NED
1st place, gold medalist(s)		Jutta Leerdam	NED
2nd place, silver medalist(s)		Joy Beune	NED
2nd place, silver medalist(s)		Femke Kok	NED
3rd place, bronze medalist(s)		Ragne Wiklund	NOR
3rd place, bronze medalist(s)		Suzanne Schulting	NED

The 2025 European Speed Skating Championships were held from 10 to 12 January 2025, at the Thialf in Heerenveen, Netherlands. Sander Eitrem won the men´s allround championship and established new Norwegian records for the 5000 and 10000 meters. Antoinette Rijpma-de Jong became women´s allround champion for the fourth time in a row. Jutta Leerdam won her third European sprint title and the men´s European sprint title was for Jenning de Boo.

== Format ==
Since 2017, in odd years, the Championships contain four separate events with four races each:

- Women Sprint: two races each of 500 and 1000 meters
- Women Allround: 500, 1500, 3000 and 5000 meters
- Men Sprint: two races each of 500 and 1000 meters
- Men Allround: 500, 1500, 5000 and 10000 meters

Competitors score points in each race. The points are calculated as the average time per 500 meter. The competitor with the least points after four races wins the event.

== Schedule ==
All times are local (UTC+1).

Date	Time	Events
10 January	19.00	500 m women sprint 1st race
10 January	19:28	500 m men sprint 1st race
10 January	20.07	1000 m women sprint 1st race
10 January	20:55	1000 m men sprint 1st race
11 January	10.55	500 m women sprint 2nd race
11 January	11.23	500 m men sprint 2nd race
11 January	12:06	500 m women all-round
11 January	12:34	500 m men all-round
11 January	13:17	1000 m women sprint 2nd race
11 January	14.05	1000 m men sprint 2nd race
11 January	14.52	3000 women all-round
11 January	16.07	5000 m men all-round
12 January	13:40	1500 women all-round
12 January	14:35	1500 m men all-round
12 January	15:29	5000 m women all-round
12 January	16:23	10000 m men all-round

== Medal summary ==
=== Medal table ===
* Host nation (Netherlands)

Rank	Nation	Gold	Silver	Bronze	Total
1	Netherlands*	3	3	3	9
2	Norway	1	1	1	3
Totals (2 entries)		4	4	4	12

=== Medalists ===
Event	Gold		Silver		Bronze	
Men's allround	Sander Eitrem; Norway	146.561	Peder Kongshaug; Norway	147.612	Beau Snellink; Netherlands	149.092
Women's allround	Antoinette Rijpma-de Jong; Netherlands	159.211	Joy Beune; Netherlands	159.330	Ragne Wiklund; Norway	159.942
Men's sprint	Jenning de Boo; Netherlands	136.670	Merijn Scheperkamp; Netherlands	137.525	Tim Prins; Netherlands	137.845
Women's sprint	Jutta Leerdam; Netherlands	150.060	Femke Kok; Netherlands	150.100	Suzanne Schulting; Netherlands	151.135

== Allround ==
=== Men's championships ===
==== 500 m ====
Rank	Pair	Lane	Name	Nat.	Time	Diff	Points
1	1	i	Kim Min-Seok	(Hungary)	35.63		35.630
2	9	i	Peder Kongshaug	(Norway)	35.94	+0.31	35.940
3	9	o	Daniele Di Stefano	(Italy)	36.30	+0.67	36.300
4	2	o	Indra Médard	(Belgium)	36.52	+0.89	36.520
5	10	o	Valentin Thiebault	(France)	36.57	+0.94	36.570
6	8	i	Sander Eitrem	(Norway)	36.79	+1.16	36.790
7	6	i	Konstantin Götze	(Germany)	36.96	+1.33	36.960
8	7	o	Kristian Gamme Ulekleiv	(Norway)	36.99	+1.36	36.990
9	8	o	Prokop Stodola	(Czech Republic)	37.24	+1.61	37.240
10	5	i	Vladimir Semirunniy	(Poland)	37.27	+1.64	37.270
11	6	o	Marcel Bosker	(Netherlands)	37.30	+1.67	37.300
12	1	o	Bart Swings	(Belgium)	37.38	+1.75	37.380
13	10	i	Andrea Giovannini	(Italy)	37.43	+1.80	37.430
14	5	o	Beau Snellink	(Netherlands)	37.67	+2.04	37.670
15	7	i	Mathieu Belloir	(France)	37.82	+2.19	37.820
16	4	i	Philip Due Schmidt	(Denmark)	38.22	+2.59	38.220
17	4	o	Davide Ghiotto	(Italy)	38.31	+2.68	38.310
18	2	i	Fridtjof Petzold	(Germany)	38.33	+2.70	38.330
19	3	i	Bogdan Brauer	(Germany)	39.20	+3.57	39.200
	3	o	Chris Huizinga	(Netherlands)	Disqualified		

==== 5000 m ====
Rank	Pair	Lane	Name	Nat.	Time	Diff	Points
1	9	i	Sander Eitrem	(Norway)	6:06.20		36.620
2	9	o	Beau Snellink	(Netherlands)	6:08.91	+2.71	36.891
3	8	i	Chris Huizinga	(Netherlands)	6:09.48	+3.28	36.948
4	10	i	Davide Ghiotto	(Italy)	6:09.56	+3.36	36.956
5	7	o	Peder Kongshaug	(Norway)	6:13.05	+6.85	37.305
6	10	o	Marcel Bosker	(Netherlands)	6:15.99	+9.79	37.599
7	8	o	Bart Swings	(Belgium)	6:19.35	+13.15	37.935
8	6	o	Andrea Giovannini	(Italy)	6:21.55	+15.35	38.155
9	5	o	Kristian Gamme Ulekleiv	(Norway)	6:23.36	+17.16	38.336
10	6	i	Vladimir Semirunniy	(Poland)	6:24.16	+17.96	38.416
11	7	i	Daniele Di Stefano	(Italy)	6:24.42	+18.22	38.442
12	5	i	Fridtjof Petzold	(Germany)	6:25.54	+19.34	38.554
13	4	i	Kim Min-Seok	(Hungary)	6:32.62	+26.42	39.262
14	2	o	Mathieu Belloir	(France)	6:33.95	+27.75	39.395
15	3	o	Indra Médard	(Belgium)	6:34.10	+27.90	39.410
16	1	o	Valentin Thiebault	(France)	6:34.47	+28.27	39.447
17	2	i	Philip Due Schmidt	(Denmark)	6:38.50	+32.30	39.850
18	3	i	Konstantin Götze	(Germany)	6:38.92	+32.72	39.892
19	1	i	Prokop Stodola	(Czech Republic)	6:53.47	+47.27	41.347
	4	o	Bogdan Brauer	(Germany)	Did not finish		

==== 1500 m ====
Rank	Pair	Lane	Name	Nat.	Time	Diff	Points
1	9	i	Peder Kongshaug	(Norway)	1:44.01		34.670
2	9	o	Sander Eitrem	(Norway)	1:44.27	+0.26	34.756
3	7	i	Kim Min-seok	(Hungary)	1:45.61	+1.60	35.203
4	7	o	Marcel Bosker	(Netherlands)	1:46.68	+2.67	35.560
5	8	o	Daniele Di Stefano	(Italy)	1:46.82	+2.81	35.606
6	6	o	Bart Swings	(Belgium)	1:47.02	+3.01	35.673
7	4	i	Vladimir Semirunniy	(Poland)	1:47.32	+3.31	35.773
8	5	i	Kristian Gamme Ulekleiv	(Norway)	1:47.33	+3.32	35.776
9	8	i	Beau Snellink	(Netherlands)	1:47.38	+3.37	35.793
10	4	o	Indra Médard	(Belgium)	1:47.83	+3.82	35.943
11	5	o	Andrea Giovannini	(Italy)	1:48.48	+4.47	36.160
12	3	i	Valentin Thiebault	(France)	1:48.94	+4.93	36.313
13	6	i	Davide Ghiotto	(Italy)	1:50.30	+6.29	36.766
14	2	i	Fridtjof Petzold	(Germany)	1:50.71	+6.70	36.903
15	2	o	Prokop Stodola	(Czech Republic)	1:52.33	+8.32	37.443
16	1	i	Philip Due Schmidt	(Denmark)	1:53.57	+9.56	37.856
	3	o	Konstantin Götze	(Germany)	Did not finish		

==== 10,000 m ====
Rank	Pair	Lane	Name	Nat.	Time	Diff	Points
1	1	o	Davide Ghiotto	(Italy)	12:35.96		37.798
2	4	o	Sander Eitrem	(Norway)	12:47.90	+11.94	38.395
3	2	i	Beau Snellink	(Netherlands)	12:54.76	+18.80	38.738
4	1	i	Bart Swings	(Belgium)	13:08.30	+32.34	39.415
5	2	o	Marcel Bosker	(Netherlands)	13:12.00	+36.04	39.600
6	4	i	Peder Kongshaug	(Norway)	13:13.94	+37.98	39.697
7	3	o	Daniele Di Stefano	(Italy)	13:34.95	+58.99	40.747
8	3	i	Kim Min-seok	(Hungary)	14:05.75	+1:29.79	42.287

==== Final ranking ====
Rank	Skater	Nation	500 m	5000 m	1500 m	10,000 m	Points	Behind
1st place, gold medalist(s)	Sander Eitrem	Norway	36.79 (6)	6:06.20 (1)	1:44.27 (2)	12:47.90 (2)	146.561	
2nd place, silver medalist(s)	Peder Kongshaug	Norway	35.94 (2)	6:13.05 (5)	1:44.01 (1)	13:13.94 (6)	147.612	+21.02
3rd place, bronze medalist(s)	Beau Snellink	Netherlands	37.67 (14)	6:08.91 (2)	1:47.38 (9)	12:54.76 (3)	149.092	+50.62
4	Davide Ghiotto	Italy	38.31 (17)	6:09.56 (4)	1:50.30 (13)	12:35.96 (1)	149.830	+1:05.38
5	Marcel Bosker	Netherlands	37.30 (11)	6:15.99 (6)	1:46.68 (4)	13:12.00 (5)	150.059	+1:09.96
6	Bart Swings	Belgium	37.38 (12)	6:19.35 (7)	1:47.02 (6)	13:08.30 (4)	150.403	+1:16.84
7	Daniele Di Stefano	Italy	36.30 (3)	6:24.42 (11)	1:46.82 (5)	13:34.95 (7)	151.095	+1:30.68
8	Kim Min-Seok	Hungary	35.63 (1)	6:32.62 (13)	1:45.61 (3)	14:05.75 (8)	152.382	+1:56.42
9	Kristian Gamme Ulekleiv	Norway	36.99 (8)	6:23.36 (9)	1:47.33 (8)	—	111.102	—
10	Vladimir Semirunniy	Poland	37.27 (10)	6:24.16 (10)	1:47.32 (7)	—	111.459	—
11	Andrea Giovannini	Italy	37.43 (13)	6:21.55 (8)	1:48.48 (11)	—	111.745	—
12	Indra Médard	Belgium	36.52 (4)	6:34.10 (15)	1:47.83 (10)	—	111.873	—
13	Valentin Thiebault	France	36.57 (5)	6:34.47 (16)	1:48.94 (12)	—	112.330	—
14	Fridtjof Petzold	Germany	38.33 (18)	6:25.54 (12)	1:50.71 (14)	—	113.787	—
15	Philip Due Schmidt	Denmark	38.22 (16)	6:38.50 (17)	1:53.57 (16)	—	115.926	—
16	Prokop Stodola	Czech Republic	37.24 (9)	6:53.47 (19)	1:52.33 (15)	—	116.030	—
	Konstantin Götze	Germany	36.96 (7)	6:38.92 (18)	DNF	—	—	—
	Mathieu Belloir	France	37.82 (15)	6:33.95 (14)	—	—	—	—
	Bogdan Brauer	Germany	39.20 (19)	DNF	—	—	—	—
	Chris Huizinga	Netherlands	DQ	6:09.48 (3)	—	—	—	—

=== Women's championships ===
==== 500 m ====
Rank	Pair	Lane	Name	Nat.	Time	Diff	Points
1	7	i	Antoinette Rijpma-de Jong	(Netherlands)	38.50		38.500
2	8	o	Joy Beune	(Netherlands)	39.31	+0.81	39.310
3	9	i	Natalia Jabrzyk	(Poland)	39.69	+1.19	39.690
4	9	o	Francesca Lollobrigida	(Italy)	39.70	+1.20	39.700
5	7	o	Olga Piotrowska	(Poland)	39.83	+1.33	39.830
6	4	o	Merel Conijn	(Netherlands)	39.85	+1.35	39.850
7	8	i	Jeannine Rosner	(Austria)	39.99	+1.49	39.990
8	6	o	Sandrine Tas	(Belgium)	40.03	+1.53	40.030
9	4	i	Ragne Wiklund	(Norway)	40.16	+1.66	40.160
10	5	i	Aurora Grinden Lǿvẚs	(Norway)	40.68	+2.18	40.680
11	6	i	Veronica Luciani	(Italy)	41.24	+2.74	41.240
12	5	o	Veronika Antošová	(Czech Republic)	41.26	+2.76	41.260
13	1	i	Josie Hofmann	(Germany)	41.56	+3.06	41.560
14	2	o	Maira Jasch	(Germany)	41.94	+3.44	41.940
15	2	i	Julia Nizan	(France)	42.03	+3.53	42.030
16	3	i	Zuzana Kuršová	(Czech Republic)	42.81	+4.31	42.810
17	3	o	Alice Marletti	(Italy)	43.14	+4.64	43.140

==== 3000 m ====
Rank	Pair	Lane	Name	Nat.	Time	Diff	Points
1	8	i	Ragne Wiklund	(Norway)	3:59.43		39.905
2	8	o	Francesca Lollobrigida	(Italy)	4:00.37	+0.94	40.061
3	9	o	Joy Beune	(Netherlands)	4:00.39	+0.96	40.065
4	7	i	Merel Conijn	(Netherlands)	4:01.48	+2.05	40.246
5	9	i	Antoinette Rijpma-de Jong	(Netherlands)	4:01.61	+2.18	40.268
6	4	i	Sandrine Tas	(Belgium)	4:08.07	+8.64	41.345
7	4	o	Josie Hofmann	(Germany)	4:09.63	+10.20	41.605
8	7	o	Maira Jasch	(Germany)	4:11.03	+11.60	41.838
9	5	i	Alice Marletti	(Italy)	4:11.97	+12.54	41.995
10	6	o	Jeannine Rosner	(Austria)	4:12.91	+13.48	42.151
11	2	i	Natalia Jabrzyk	(Poland)	4:15.82	+16.39	42.636
12	6	i	Zuzana Kuršová	(Czech Republic)	4:19.09	+19.66	43.181
13	1	i	Julia Nizan	(France)	4:19.57	+20.14	43.261
14	2	o	Veronica Luciani	(Italy)	4:20.59	+21.16	43.431
15	5	o	Aurora Grinden Lǿvẚs	(Norway)	4:22.32	+22.89	43.720
16	3	o	Olga Piotrowska	(Poland)	4:22.50	+23.07	43.750
17	3	i	Veronika Antošová	(Czech Republic)	4:38.88	+39.45	46.480

==== 1500 m ====
Rank	Pair	Lane	Name	Nat.	Time	Diff	Points
1	9	o	Joy Beune	(Netherlands)	1:54.60		38.200
2	9	i	Antoinette Rijpma-de Jong	(Netherlands)	1:54.69	+0.09	38.230
3	8	o	Ragne Wiklund	(Norway)	1:56.39	+1.79	38.796
4	8	i	Francesca Lollobrigida	(Italy)	1:57.19	+2.59	39.063
5	7	i	Merel Conijn	(Netherlands)	1:57.50	+2.90	39.166
6	6	o	Natalia Jabrzyk	(Poland)	1:58.60	+4.00	39.533
7	7	o	Sandrine Tas	(Belgium)	1:58.62	+4.02	39.540
8	5	i	Josie Hofmann	(Germany)	1:59.70	+5.10	39.900
9	6	i	Jeannine Rosner	(Austria)	1:59.85	+5.25	39.950
10	4	i	Maira Jasch	(Germany)	2:00.74	+6.14	40.246
11	5	o	Olga Piotrowska	(Poland)	2:01.57	+6.97	40.523
12	3	o	Alice Marletti	(Italy)	2:02.04	+7.44	40.680
13	4	o	Aurora Grinden Lǿvaš	(Norway)	2:02.06	+7.46	40.686
14	3	i	Veronica Luciani	(Italy)	2:02.71	+8.11	40.903
15	2	o	Zuzana Kuršová	(Czech Republic)	2:04.09	+9.49	41.363
16	2	i	Julia Nizan	(France)	2:05.64	+11.04	41.880
17	1	o	Veronika Antošová	(Czech Republic)	2:09.20	+14.60	43.066

==== 5000 m ====
Rank	Pair	Lane	Name	Nat.	Time	Diff	Points
1	3	o	Ragne Wiklund	(Norway)	6:50.81		41.081
2	2	i	Merel Conijn	(Netherlands)	6:52.43	+1.62	41.243
3	4	o	Joy Beune	(Netherlands)	6:57.55	+6.74	41.755
4	3	i	Francesca Lollobrigida	(Italy)	6:58.50	+7.69	41.850
5	4	i	Antoinette Rijpma-de Jong	(Netherlands)	7:02.13	+11.32	42.213
6	2	o	Sandrine Tas	(Belgium)	7:12.24	+21.43	43.224
7	1	o	Josie Hofmann	(Germany)	7:14.85	+24.04	43.485
8	1	i	Natalia Jabrzyk	(Poland)	7:31:51	+40.70	45.151

==== Final ranking ====
Rank	Skater	Nation	500 m	3000 m	1500 m	5000 m	Points	Behind
1st place, gold medalist(s)	Antoinette Rijpma-de Jong	Netherlands	38.50 (1)	4:01.61 (5)	1:54.69 (2)	7:02.13 (5)	159.211	
2nd place, silver medalist(s)	Joy Beune	Netherlands	39.31 (2)	4:00.39 (3)	1:54.60 (1)	6:57.55 (3)	159.330	+1.19
3rd place, bronze medalist(s)	Ragne Wiklund	Norway	40.16 (9)	3:59.43 (1)	1:56.39 (3)	6:50.81 (1)	159.942	+7.31
4	Merel Conijn	Netherlands	39.85 (6)	4:01.48 (4)	1:57.50 (5)	6:52.43 (2)	160.505	+12.94
5	Francesca Lollobrigida	Italy	39.70 (4)	4:00.37 (2)	1:57.19 (4)	6:58.50 (4)	160.674	+14.63
6	Sandrine Tas	Belgium	40.03 (8)	4:08.07 (6)	1:58.62 (7)	7:12.24 (6)	164.139	+49.28
7	Josie Hofmann	Germany	41.56 (13)	4:09.63 (7)	1:59.70 (8)	7:14.85 (7)	166.550	+1:13.39
8	Natalia Jabrzyk	Poland	39.69 (3)	4:15.82 (11)	1:58.60 (6)	7:31.51 (8)	167.010	+1:17.99
9	Jeannine Rosner	Austria	39.99 (7)	4:12.91 (10)	1:59.85 (9)	—	122.091	—
10	Maira Jasch	Germany	41.94 (14)	4:11.03 (8)	2:00.74 (10)	—	124.024	—
11	Olga Piotrowska	Poland	39.83 (5)	4:22.50 (16)	2:01.57 (11)	—	124.103	—
12	Aurora Grinden Lǿvẚs	Norway	40.68 (10)	4:22.32 (15)	2:02.06 (13)	—	125.086	—
13	Veronica Luciani	Italy	41.24 (11)	4:20.59 (14)	2:02.71 (14)	—	125.574	—
14	Alice Marletti	Italy	43.14 (17)	4:11.97 (9)	2:02.04 (12)	—	125.815	—
15	Julia Nizan	France	42.03 (15)	4:19.57 (13)	2:05.64 (16)	—	127.171	—
16	Zuzana Kuršová	Czech Republic	42.81 (16)	4:19.09 (12)	2:04.09 (15)	—	127.354	—
17	Veronika Antošová	Czech Republic	41.26 (12)	4:38.88 (17)	2:09.20 (17)	—	130.806	—

== Sprint ==
=== Men's championships ===
==== 1st 500 m ====
Rank	Pair	Lane	Name	Nat.	Time	Diff	Points
1	8	o	Jenning de Boo	(Netherlands)	34.47		34.470
2	8	i	Merijn Scheperkamp	(Netherlands)	34.60	+0.13	34.600
3	9	i	Damian Żurek	(Poland)	34.66	+0.19	34.660
4	5	o	Piotr Michalski	(Poland)	34.80	+0.33	34.800
5	6	i	Bjørn Magnussen	(Norway)	34.82	+0.35	34.820
6	9	o	Marten Lliv	(Estonia)	34.88	+0.41	34.880
7	10	o	Marek Kania	(Poland)	34.90	+0.43	34.900
8	5	i	Hendrik Dombek	(Germany)	35.00	+0.53	35.000
9	10	i	Tim Prins	(Netherlands)	35.03	+0.56	35.030
10	2	i	David Bosa	(Italy)	35.10	+0.63	35.100
10	7	i	Pål Myhren Kristensen	(Norway)	35.10	+0.63	35.100
12	6	o	Henrik Fagerli Rukke	(Norway)	35.15	+0.68	35.150
13	7	o	Nil Llop	(Spain)	35.18	+0.71	35.180
14	4	o	Mathias Vosté	(Belgium)	35.36	+0.89	35.360
15	2	o	Moritz Klein	(Germany)	35.61	+1.14	35.610
16	3	o	Tuukka Suomalainen	(Finland)	35.76	+1.29	35.760
17	3	i	Ignaz Gschwentner	(Austria)	35.95	+1.48	35.950
18	1	o	Robbe Beelen	(Belgium)	35.99	+1.52	35.990
19	4	i	Joonas Valge	(Estonia)	36.36	+1.89	36.360
20	1	i	Francesco Betti	(Italy)	36.38	+1.91	36.380

==== 1st 1000 m ====
Rank	Pair	Lane	Name	Nat.	Time	Diff	Points
1	10	i	Jenning de Boo	(Netherlands)	1:07.29		33.645
2	10	o	Tim Prins	(Netherlands)	1:07.89	+0.60	33.945
3	9	o	Merijn Scheperkamp	(Netherlands)	1:08.19	+0.90	34.095
4	6	o	Hendrik Dombek	(Germany)	1:08.22	+0.93	34.110
5	9	i	Damian Żurek	(Poland)	1:08.32	+1.03	34.160
6	8	o	Marten Lliv	(Estonia)	1:08.46	+1.17	34.230
7	5	i	Piotr Michalski	(Poland)	1:08.61	+1.32	34.305
8	5	o	Mathias Vosté	(Belgium)	1:08.72	+1.43	34.360
9	6	i	Marek Kania	(Poland)	1:08.82	+1.53	34.410
10	3	i	David Bosa	(Italy)	1:09.39	+2.10	34.695
11	7	o	Nil Llop	(Spain)	1:09.69	+2.40	34.845
12	7	i	Bjørn Magnussen	(Norway)	1:09.73	+2.44	34.865
13	3	o	Henrik Fagerli Rukke	(Norway)	1:09.88	+2.59	34.940
14	8	i	Moritz Klein	(Germany)	1:10.15	+2.86	35.075
15	2	i	Francesco Betti	(Italy)	1:10.84	+3.55	35.420
16	1	i	Pål Myhren Kristensen	(Norway)	1:11.17	+3.88	35.585
17	4	o	Tuukka Suomalainen	(Finland)	1:11.38	+4.09	35.690
18	2	o	Robbe Beelen	(Belgium)	1:11.51	+4.22	35.755
19	1	i	Ignaz Gschwentner	(Austria)	1:12.80	+5.51	36.400
20	4	i	Joonas Valge	(Estonia)	1:13.01	+5.72	36.505

==== 2nd 500 m ====
Rank	Pair	Lane	Name	Nat.	Time	Diff	Points
1	10	i	Jenning de Boo	(Netherlands)	34.39		34.390
2	10	o	Merijn Scheperkamp	(Netherlands)	34.58	+0.19	34.580
3	8	i	Marten Liiv	(Estonia)	34.85	+0.46	34.850
3	8	o	Tim Prins	(Netherlands)	34.85	+0.46	34.850
5	7	i	Marek Kania	(Poland)	34.91	+0.52	34.910
6	6	o	Bjǿrn Magnussen	(Norway)	35.02	+0.63	35.020
7	9	o	Damian Zurek	(Poland)	35.18	+0.79	35.180
8	7	o	Hendrik Dombek	(Germany)	35.24	+0.85	35.240
9	4	o	Pẚl Myhren Kristensen	(Norway)	35.39	+1.00	35.390
9	5	i	Nil Llop	(Spain)	35.39	+1.00	35.390
11	9	i	Piotr Michalski	(Poland)	35.45	+1.06	35.450
12	5	o	David Bosa	(Italy)	35.46	+1.07	35.460
13	4	i	Henrik Fagerli Rukke	(Norway)	35.52	+1.13	35.520
14	2	o	Ignaz Gschwentner	(Austria)	35.96	+1.57	35.960
15	6	i	Mathias Vosté	(Belgium)	36.04	+1.65	36.040
16	3	i	Moritz Klein	(Germany)	36.08	+1.69	36.080
17	1	i	Robbe Beelen	(Belgium)	36.52	+2.13	36.520
18	3	o	Francesco Betti	(Italy)	36.53	+2.14	36.530
19	1	o	Joonas Valge	(Estonia)	36.66	+2.27	36.660
	2	i	Tuukka Suomalainen	(Finland)	Did not finish		

==== 2nd 1000 m ====
Rank	Pair	Lane	Name	Nat.	Time	Diff	Points
1	9	i	Tim Prins	(Netherlands)	1:08.04		34.020
2	10	o	Jenning de Boo	(Netherlands)	1:08.33	+0.29	34.165
3	9	o	Damian Żurek	(Poland)	1:08.38	+0.34	34.190
4	10	i	Merijn Scheperkamp	(Netherlands)	1:08.50	+0.46	34.250
5	8	i	Marten Lliv	(Estonia)	1:08.74	+0.70	34.370
6	4	i	Mathias Vosté	(Belgium)	1:09.07	+1.03	34.535
7	7	i	Hendrik Dombek	(Germany)	1:09.10	+1.06	34.550
8	8	o	Marek Kania	(Poland)	1:09.62	+1.58	34.810
9	5	o	David Bosa	(Italy)	1:09.70	+1.66	34.850
10	7	o	Piotr Michalski	(Poland)	1:10.02	+1.98	35.010
11	6	i	Nil Llop	(Spain)	1:10.25	+2.21	35.125
12	5	i	Henrik Fagerli Rukke	(Norway)	1:10.26	+2.22	35.130
13	2	o	Francesco Betti	(Italy)	1:10.85	+2.81	35.425
14	6	o	Bjørn Magnussen	(Norway)	1:10.86	+2.82	35.430
15	3	i	Pål Myhren Kristensen	(Norway)	1:10.92	+2.88	35.460
16	4	o	Moritz Klein	(Germany)	1:11.08	+3.04	35.540
17	2	i	Robbe Beelen	(Belgium)	1:11.73	+3.69	35.865
18	3	o	Ignaz Gschwentner	(Austria)	1:12.83	+4.79	36.415
19	1	o	Joonas Valge	(Estonia)	1:13.24	+5.20	36.620

==== Final ranking ====
Rank	Skater	Nation	500 m	1000 m	500 m	1000 m	Points	Behind
1st place, gold medalist(s)	Jenning de Boo	Netherlands	34.47 (1)	1:07.29 (1)	34.39 (1)	1:08.33 (2)	136.670	
2nd place, silver medalist(s)	Merijn Scheperkamp	Netherlands	34.60 (2)	1:08.19 (3)	34.58 (2)	1:08.50 (4)	137.525	+1.71
3rd place, bronze medalist(s)	Tim Prins	Netherlands	35.03 (9)	1:07.89 (2)	34.85 (3)	1:08.04 (1)	137.845	+2.35
4	Damian Zurek	Poland	34.66 (3)	1:08.32 (5)	35.18 (7)	1:08.38 (3)	138.190	+3.04
5	Marten Liiv	Estonia	34.88 (6)	1:08.46 (6)	34.85 (3)	1:08.74 (5)	138.330	+3.32
6	Hendrik Dombek	Germany	35.00 (8)	1:08.22 (4)	35.24 (8)	1:09.10 (7)	138.900	+4.46
7	Marek Kania	Poland	34.90 (7)	1:08.82 (9)	34.91 (5)	1:09.62 (8)	139.030	+4.72
8	Piotr Michalski	Poland	34.80 (4)	1:08.61 (7)	35.45 (11)	1:10.02 (10)	139.565	+5.79
9	David Bosa	Italy	35.10 (10)	1:09.39 (10)	35.46 (12)	1:09.70 (9)	140.105	+6.87
10	Bjǿrn Magnussen	Norway	34.82 (5)	1:09.73 (12)	35.02 (6)	1:10.86 (14)	140.135	+6.93
11	Mathias Vosté	Belgium	35.36 (14)	1:08.72 (8)	36.04 (15)	1:09.07 (6)	140.295	+7.25
12	Nil Llop	Spain	35.18 (13)	1:09.69 (11)	35.39 (9)	1:10.25 (11)	140.540	+7.74
13	Henrik Fagerli Rukke	Norway	35.15 (12)	1:09.88 (13)	35.52 (13)	1:10.26 (12)	140.740	+8.14
14	Pẚl Myhren Kristensen	Norway	35.10 (10)	1:11.17 (16)	35.39 (9)	1:10.92 (15)	141.535	+9.73
15	Moritz Klein	Germany	35.61 (15)	1:10.15 (14)	36.08 (16)	1:11.08 (16)	142.305	+11.27
16	Francesco Betti	Italy	36.38 (20)	1:10.84 (15)	36.53 (18)	1:10.85 (13)	143.755	+14.17
17	Robbe Beelen	Belgium	35.99 (18)	1:11.51 (18)	36.52 (17)	1:11.73 (17)	144.130	+14.92
18	Ignaz Gschwentner	Austria	35.95 (17)	1:12.80 (19)	35.96 (14)	1:12.83 (18)	144.725	+16.11
19	Joonas Valge	Estonia	36.36 (19)	1:13.01 (20)	36.66 (19)	1:13.24 (19)	146.145	+18.95
	Tuukka Suomalainen	Finland	35.76 (16)	1:11.38 (17)	DNF	—		

=== Women's championships ===
==== 1st 500 m ====
Rank	Pair	Lane	Name	Nat.	Time	Diff	Points
1	7	o	Femke Kok	(Netherlands)	37.58		37.580
2	9	o	Jutta Leerdam	(Netherlands)	37.77	+0.19	37.770
3	9	i	Suzanne Schulting	(Netherlands)	37.82	+0.24	37.820
4	7	i	Kaja Ziomek-Nogal	(Poland)	37.92	+0.34	37.920
5	6	o	Karolina Bosiek	(Poland)	38.39	+0.81	38.390
6	8	i	Vanessa Herzog	(Austria)	38.55	+0.97	38.550
7	8	o	Sofia Thorup-Prosvirnova	(Denmark)	38.77	+1.19	38.770
8	6	i	Serena Pergher	(Italy)	38.83	+1.25	38.830
9	2	o	Isabelle van Elst	(Belgium)	39.00	+1.42	39.000
10	5	i	Julie Nistad Samsonsen	(Norway)	39.03	+1.45	39.030
11	4	i	Fran Vanhoutte	(Belgium)	39.14	+1.56	39.140
12	3	i	Iga Wojtasik	(Poland)	39.15	+1.57	39.150
13	4	o	Lea Sophie Scholz	(Germany)	39.22	+1.64	39.220
14	3	o	Giorgia Aiello	(Italy)	39.48	+1.90	39.480
15	1	i	Carina Jagtøyen	(Norway)	39.66	+2.08	39.660
16	2	i	Marlen Ehseluns	(Germany)	39.92	+2.34	39.920
	5	o	Luisa González	(Spain)	Disqualified		

==== 1st 1000 m ====
Rank	Pair	Lane	Name	Nat.	Time	Diff	Points
1	7	o	Jutta Leerdam	(Netherlands)	1:14.21		37.105
2	9	i	Femke Kok	(Netherlands)	1:14.97	+0.76	37.485
3	8	o	Suzanne Schulting	(Netherlands)	1:15.40	+1.19	37.700
4	8	i	Karolina Bosiek	(Poland)	1:16.09	+1.88	38.045
5	9	o	Sofia Thorup-Prosvirnova	(Denmark)	1:16.15	+1.94	38.075
6	5	i	Isabelle van Elst	(Belgium)	1:16.43	+2.22	38.215
7	5	o	Kaja Ziomek-Nogal	(Poland)	1:16.71	+2.50	38.355
8	6	o	Lea Sophie Scholz	(Germany)	1:17.16	+2.95	38.580
9	7	i	Vanessa Herzog	(Austria)	1:17.62	+3.41	38.810
10	4	o	Julie Nistad Samsonsen	(Norway)	1:17.90	+3.69	38.950
11	2	o	Giorgia Aiello	(Italy)	1:18.08	+3.87	39.040
12	6	i	Marlen Ehseluns	(Germany)	1:18.20	+3.99	39.100
13	1	i	Iga Wojtasik	(Poland)	1:19.02	+4.81	39.510
14	4	i	Serena Pergher	(Italy)	1:19.08	+4.87	39.540
15	3	i	Fran Vanhoutte	(Belgium)	1:19.28	+5.07	39.640
16	2	i	Carina Jagtøyen	(Norway)	1:19.76	+5.55	39.880
	3	o	Luisa González	(Spain)	Did not start		

==== 2nd 500 m ====
Rank	Pair	Lane	Name	Nat.	Time	Diff	Points
1	7	i	Femke Kok	(Netherlands)	37.53		37.530
2	7	o	Kaja Ziomek-Nogal	(Poland)	37.65	+0.12	37.650
3	8	i	Jutta Leerdam	(Netherlands)	37.96	+0.43	37.960
3	8	o	Suzanne Schulting	(Netherlands)	37.96	+0.43	37.960
5	5	o	Serena Pergher	(Italy)	38.53	+1.00	38.530
6	5	i	Sofia Thorup-Prosvimova	(Denmark)	38.87	+1.34	38.870
7	6	i	Karolina Bosiek	(Poland)	39.01	+1.48	39.010
8	3	o	Fran Vanhoutte	(Belgium)	39.27	+1.74	39.270
9	4	o	Iga Wojtasik	(Poland)	39.28	+1.75	39.280
10	6	o	Julie Nistad Samsonsen	(Norway)	39.31	+1.78	39.310
11	2	i	Giorgia Aiello	(Italy)	39.34	+1.81	39.340
12	4	i	Isabelle van Elst	(Belgium)	39.51	+1.98	39.510
13	1	o	Carina Jagtøyen	(Norway)	39.69	+2.16	39.690
14	2	o	Marlen Ehseluns	(Germany)	40.31	+2.78	40.310
	3	i	Lea Sophie Scholz	(Germany)	Disqualified		

==== 2nd 1000 m ====
Rank	Pair	Lane	Name	Nat.	Time	Diff	Points
1	8	i	Jutta Leerdam	(Netherlands)	1:14.45		37.225
2	8	o	Femke Kok	(Netherlands)	1:15.01	+0.56	37.505
3	7	i	Suzanne Schulting	(Netherlands)	1:15.31	+0.86	37.655
4	7	o	Karolina Bosiek	(Poland)	1:16.61	+2.16	38.305
5	6	i	Kaja Ziomek-Nogal	(Poland)	1:16.65	+2.20	38.325
6	5	i	Sofia Thorup-Prosvirnova	(Denmark)	1:16.79	+2.34	38.395
7	6	i	Isabelle van Elst	(Belgium)	1:17.26	+2.81	38.630
8	4	o	Iga Wojtasik	(Poland)	1:17.97	+3.52	38.985
9	4	i	Julie Nistad Samsonsen	(Norway)	1:18.10	+3.65	39.050
10	3	i	Giorgia Aiello	(Italy)	1:18.19	+3.74	39.095
11	3	o	Fran Vanhoutte	(Belgium)	1:18.38	+3.93	39.190
12	5	o	Serena Pergher	(Italy)	1:18.79	+4.34	39.395
13	2	o	Carina Jagtøyen	(Norway)	1:19.74	+5.29	39.870
14	1	o	Marlen Ehseluns	(Germany)	1:20.43	+5.98	40.215

==== Final ranking ====
Rank	Skater	Nation	500 m	1000 m	500 m	1000 m	Points	Behind
1st place, gold medalist(s)	Jutta Leerdam	Netherlands	37.77 (2)	1:14.21 (1)	37.96 (3)	1:14.45 (1)	150.060	
2nd place, silver medalist(s)	Femke Kok	Netherlands	37.58 (1)	1:14.97 (2)	37.53 (1)	1:15.01 (2)	150.100	+0.08
3rd place, bronze medalist(s)	Suzanne Schulting	Netherlands	37.82 (3)	1:15.40 (3)	37.96 (3)	1:15.31 (3)	151.135	+2.15
4	Kaja Ziomek-Nogal	Poland	37.92 (4)	1:16.71 (7)	37.65 (2)	1:16.65 (5)	152.250	+4.38
5	Karolina Bosiek	Poland	38.39 (5)	1:16.09 (4)	39.01 (7)	1:16.61 (4)	153.750	+7.38
6	Sofia Thorup-Prosvirnova	Denmark	38.77 (7)	1:16.15 (5)	38.87 (6)	1:16.79 (6)	154.110	+8.10
7	Isabelle van Elst	Belgium	39.00 (9)	1:16.43 (6)	39.51 (12)	1:17.26 (7)	155.355	+10.59
8	Serena Pergher	Italy	38.83 (8)	1:19.08 (14)	38.53 (5)	1:18.79 (12)	156.295	+12.47
9	Julie Nistad Samsonsen	Norway	39.03 (10)	1:17.90 (10)	39.31 (10)	1:18.10 (9)	156.340	+12.56
10	Iga Wojtasik	Poland	39.15 (12)	1:19.02 (13)	39.28 (9)	1:17.97 (8)	156.925	+13.73
11	Giorgia Aiello	Italy	39.48 (14)	1:18.08 (11)	39.34 (11)	1:18.19 (10)	156.955	+13.79
12	Fran Vanhoutte	Belgium	39.14 (11)	1:19.28 (15)	39.27 (8)	1:18.38 (11)	157.240	+14.36
13	Carina Jagtøyen	Norway	39.66 (15)	1:19.76 (16)	39.69 (13)	1:19.74 (13)	159.100	+18.08
14	Marlen Ehseluns	Germany	39.92 (16)	1:18.20 (12)	40.31 (14)	1:20.43 (14)	159.545	+18.97
	Lea Sophie Scholz	Germany	39.22 (13)	1:17.16 (8)	DQ	—		
	Vanessa Herzog	Austria	38.55 (6)	1:17.62 (9)	WDR	—		
	Luisa González	Spain	DQ	—				
