= 2022 World Sprint Speed Skating Championships – Women =

Women at the 2022 World Sprint Speed Skating Championships
- Venue: Vikingskipet
- Location: Hamar, Norway
- Dates: 3–5 March
- Competitors: 19 from 9 nations
- Winning points: 151.140

Medalists
gold medal	Jutta Leerdam	Netherlands
silver medal	Femke Kok	Netherlands
bronze medal	Vanessa Herzog	Austria

The Women competition at the 2022 World Sprint Speed Skating Championships was held from 3 to 5 March 2022.

== Results ==
=== 500 m ===
The race started on 3 March at 17:30.

Rank	Pair	Lane	Name	Country	Time	Diff
1	7	I	Femke Kok	Netherlands	37.78	
2	6	O	Vanessa Herzog	Austria	37.93	+0.15
3	9	O	Kaja Ziomek	Poland	37.94	+0.16
3	8	I	Andżelika Wójcik	Poland	37.94	+0.16
5	9	I	Jutta Leerdam	Netherlands	38.11	+0.33
6	6	I	Michelle de Jong	Netherlands	38.27	+0.49
7	7	O	Yekaterina Aidova	Kazakhstan	38.40	+0.62
8	8	O	Kimi Goetz	United States	38.41	+0.63
9	4	O	Arisa Tsujimoto	Japan	38.62	+0.84
10	3	O	Martine Ripsrud	Norway	38.86	+1.08
11	5	O	Maki Tsuji	Japan	39.04	+1.26
11	3	I	Rio Yamada	Japan	39.04	+1.26
13	4	I	Julie Nistad Samsonsen	Norway	39.17	+1.39
14	5	I	Brooklyn McDougall	Canada	39.19	+1.41
15	2	O	Ellia Smeding	United Kingdom	39.27	+1.49
16	2	I	Karolina Bosiek	Poland	39.28	+1.50
17	1	I	Maddison Pearman	Canada	40.08	+2.30
–	–		Huang Yu-ting	Chinese Taipei	Withdrawn	

=== 1000 m ===
The race started on 3 March at 18.39.

Rank	Pair	Lane	Name	Country	Time	Diff
1	7	O	Jutta Leerdam	Netherlands	1:14.88	
2	8	O	Femke Kok	Netherlands	1:15.68	+0.80
3	9	O	Kimi Goetz	United States	1:15.89	+1.01
4	9	I	Vanessa Herzog	Austria	1:16.42	+1.54
5	7	I	Andżelika Wójcik	Poland	1:16.98	+2.10
6	6	I	Rio Yamada	Japan	1:17.04	+2.16
7	4	I	Kaja Ziomek	Poland	1:17.53	+2.65
8	4	O	Karolina Bosiek	Poland	1:17.61	+2.73
9	2	I	Ellia Smeding	United Kingdom	1:17.78	+2.90
10	5	O	Michelle de Jong	Netherlands	1:17.95	+3.07
11	5	I	Maddison Pearman	Canada	1:18.10	+3.22
12	6	O	Martine Ripsrud	Norway	1:18.60	+3.72
13	1	I	Arisa Tsujimoto	Japan	1:19.45	+4.57
14	2	O	Julie Nistad Samsonsen	Norway	1:20.23	+5.35
15	3	O	Maki Tsuji	Japan	1:20.44	+5.56
16	3	I	Brooklyn McDougall	Canada	1:21.59	+6.71
–	8	I	Yekaterina Aidova	Kazakhstan	Disqualified	

=== 500 m ===
The race started on 4 March at 17:30.

Rank	Pair	Lane	Name	Country	Time	Diff
1	8	O	Femke Kok	Netherlands	37.93	
2	7	O	Andżelika Wójcik	Poland	38.00	+0.07
3	9	I	Vanessa Herzog	Austria	38.05	+0.12
4	9	O	Jutta Leerdam	Netherlands	38.11	+0.18
5	6	O	Michelle de Jong	Netherlands	38.20	+0.27
6	2	I	Yekaterina Aidova	Kazakhstan	38.25	+0.32
7	7	I	Kaja Ziomek	Poland	38.50	+0.57
8	4	I	Arisa Tsujimoto	Japan	39.00	+1.07
9	4	O	Karolina Bosiek	Poland	39.06	+1.13
9	6	I	Martine Ripsrud	Norway	39.06	+1.13
11	8	I	Kimi Goetz	United States	39.10	+1.17
12	3	I	Maki Tsuji	Japan	39.25	+1.32
13	5	O	Rio Yamada	Japan	39.27	+1.34
14	5	I	Ellia Smeding	United Kingdom	39.30	+1.37
15	2	O	Julie Nistad Samsonsen	Norway	39.50	+1.57
16	1	O	Brooklyn McDougall	Canada	39.74	+1.81
17	3	O	Maddison Pearman	Canada	39.75	+1.82

=== 1000 m ===
The race started on 4 March at 18:39.

Rank	Pair	Lane	Name	Country	Time	Diff
1	7	I	Jutta Leerdam	Netherlands	1:14.96	
2	8	I	Femke Kok	Netherlands	1:15.33	+0.37
3	8	O	Vanessa Herzog	Austria	1:16.07	+1.11
4	5	I	Kimi Goetz	United States	1:16.12	+1.16
5	6	I	Michelle de Jong	Netherlands	1:17.06	+2.10
6	3	O	Ellia Smeding	United Kingdom	1:17.09	+2.13
7	5	O	Rio Yamada	Japan	1:17.35	+2.39
8	4	I	Karolina Bosiek	Poland	1:17.57	+2.61
9	7	O	Andżelika Wójcik	Poland	1:17.81	+2.85
10	3	I	Martine Ripsrud	Norway	1:17.97	+3.01
11	2	O	Maddison Pearman	Canada	1:18.10	+3.14
12	4	O	Arisa Tsujimoto	Japan	1:19.09	+4.13
13	2	I	Maki Tsuji	Japan	1:20.08	+5.12
14	1	I	Julie Nistad Samsonsen	Norway	1:20.12	+5.16
15	1	O	Brooklyn McDougall	Canada	1:23.21	+8.25
–	–		Kaja Ziomek	Poland	Did not start	

=== Overall standings ===
After all races.

Rank	Name	Country	500m	1000m	500m	1000m	Points	Diff
1st place, gold medalist(s)	Jutta Leerdam	Netherlands	38.11	1:14.88	38.11	1:14.96	151.140	
2nd place, silver medalist(s)	Femke Kok	Netherlands	37.78	1:15.68	37.93	1:15.33	151.215	+0.15
3rd place, bronze medalist(s)	Vanessa Herzog	Austria	37.93	1:16.42	38.05	1:16.07	152.225	+2.17
4	Andżelika Wójcik	Poland	37.94	1:16.98	38.00	1:17.81	153.335	+4.39
5	Kimi Goetz	United States	38.41	1:15.89	39.10	1:16.12	153.515	+4.75
6	Michelle de Jong	Netherlands	38.27	1:17.95	38.20	1:17.06	153.975	+5.67
7	Rio Yamada	Japan	39.04	1:17.04	39.27	1:17.35	155.505	+8.73
8	Karolina Bosiek	Poland	39.28	1:17.61	39.06	1:17.57	155.930	+9.58
9	Ellia Smeding	United Kingdom	39.27	1:17.78	39.30	1:17.09	156.005	+9.73
10	Martine Ripsrud	Norway	38.86	1:18.60	39.06	1:17.97	156.205	+10.13
11	Arisa Tsujimoto	Japan	38.62	1:19.45	39.00	1:19.09	156.890	+11.50
12	Maddison Pearman	Canada	40.08	1:18.10	39.75	1:18.10	157.930	+13.58
13	Maki Tsuji	Japan	39.04	1:20.44	39.25	1:20.08	158.550	+14.82
14	Julie Nistad Samsonsen	Norway	39.17	1:20.23	39.50	1:20.12	158.845	+15.41
15	Brooklyn McDougall	Canada	39.19	1:21.59	39.74	1:23.21	161.330	+20.38
–	Kaja Ziomek	Poland	37.94	1:17.53	38.50	Did not start	Did not finish	
–	Yekaterina Aidova	Kazakhstan	38.40	Disqualified	38.25	Did not start	Did not finish	
–	Huang Yu-ting	Chinese Taipei	Withdrawn				Did not finish	

== Team sprint ==
Women's team sprint at the 2022 Speed Skating Championships
- Venue: Vikingskipet
- Location: Hamar, Norway
- Dates: 5 March 2022
- Winning time: 1:27.42

Medalists
gold medal	Dione Voskamp; Jutta Leerdam; Femke Kok	Netherlands
silver medal	Andżelika Wójcik; Kaja Ziomek; Karolina Bosiek	Poland
bronze medal	Julie Nistad Samsonsen; Martine Ripsrud; Marte Bjerkreim Furnée	Norway

The Women's team sprint competition at the 2022 World Sprint Speed Skating Championships was held on 5 March 2022. It was the third edition of a team sprint world championship.

It was the first time that the team sprint event was held during the 2022 World Sprint Speed Skating Championships because there were in 2022 no World Single Distances Speed Skating Championships due to the 2022 Winter Olympics.

=== Qualification ===
Teams qualified via the overall team sprint standings of the 2021–22 ISU Speed Skating World Cup that was made on basis of the only team sprint race in November 2021 in Stavanger, Norway.

=== Dutch team selection ===
Ahead of the championships Dutch national coach Jan Coopmans selected Jutta Leerdam, Dione Voskamp and Isabelle van Elst. Femke Kok, the fastest Dutch 500m skater, was not selected. Kok said a few days before the race that she was “a bit shocked” that she was not selected and felt “very passed over”. Coopmans gave reasons that Kok did not agree with. The day before the event, Coopmans replaced Van Elst, who came especially for the team sprint event to Hamar, for Kok.

=== Results ===
The race started on 5 March at 18:00.

Rank	Pair	Lane	Country	Name	Time	Diff
1st place, gold medalist(s)	2	F	Netherlands	Dione Voskamp; Jutta Leerdam; Femke Kok	1:27.42	
2nd place, silver medalist(s)	2	C	Poland	Andżelika Wójcik; Kaja Ziomek; Karolina Bosiek	1:29.09	+1.67
3rd place, bronze medalist(s)	1	F	Norway	Julie Nistad Samsonsen; Martine Ripsrud; Marte Bjerkreim Furnée	1:34.92	+7.50

=== Aftermath ===
Because the Dutch Van Elst was suddenly removed from the selection, she decided to stop representing the Netherlands in speed skating and started skating for Belgium, as she has a Belgian mother.
