= 2024 World Single Distances Speed Skating Championships – Women's 1000 metres =

Women's 1000 metres at the 2024 World Single Distances Speed Skating Championships
- Venue: Olympic Oval
- Location: Calgary, Canada
- Dates: February 17
- Competitors: 24 from 12 nations
- Winning time: 1:12.83

Medalists
gold medal	Miho Takagi	Japan
silver medal	Han Mei	China
bronze medal	Jutta Leerdam	Netherlands

The Women's 1000 metres competition at the 2024 World Single Distances Speed Skating Championships was held on February 17, 2024.

== Results ==
The race was started at 14:03.

Rank	Pair	Lane	Name	Country	Time	Diff
1st place, gold medalist(s)	10	i	Miho Takagi	Japan	1:12.83	
2nd place, silver medalist(s)	10	o	Han Mei	China	1:13.27	+0.44
3rd place, bronze medalist(s)	12	o	Jutta Leerdam	Netherlands	1:13.28	+0.45
4	8	i	Antoinette Rijpma-de Jong	Netherlands	1:13.61	+0.78
5	11	i	Kimi Goetz	United States	1:13.68	+0.85
6	5	o	Isabel Grevelt	Netherlands	1:13.92	+1.09
7	6	i	Vanessa Herzog	Austria	1:14.27	+1.44
8	6	o	Kim Min-sun	South Korea	1:14.38	+1.55
9	7	o	Ellia Smeding	Great Britain	1:14.78	+1.95
10	3	o	Tian Ruining	China	1:14.82	+1.99
11	11	o	Brittany Bowe	United States	1:14.84	+2.01
12	12	i	Rio Yamada	Japan	1:15.17	+2.34
13	7	i	Alina Dauranova	Kazakhstan	1:15.24	+2.41
14	9	i	Yekaterina Aidova	Kazakhstan	1:15.29	+2.46
15	5	i	Erin Jackson	United States	1:15.69	+2.86
16	4	o	Maddison Pearman	Canada	1:15.95	+3.12
17	8	o	Lee Na-hyun	South Korea	1:15.97	+3.14
18	1	i	Kurumi Inagawa	Japan	1:15.98	+3.15
19	9	o	Karolina Bosiek	Poland	1:16.10	+3.27
20	4	i	Isabelle van Elst	Belgium	1:16.22	+3.39
21	3	i	Martine Ripsrud	Norway	1:16.81	+3.98
22	2	i	Pei Chong	China	1:17.03	+4.20
23	2	o	Alison Desmarais	Canada	1:17.84	+5.01
24	1	o	Inessa Shumekova	Kazakhstan	1:18.57	+5.74
