= 2021 World Single Distances Speed Skating Championships – Women's 1000 metres =

Women's 1000 metres at the 2021 World Single Distances Speed Skating Championships
- Venue: Thialf
- Location: Heerenveen, Netherlands
- Date: 13 February
- Competitors: 24 from 13 nations
- Winning time: 1:14.128

Medalists
gold medal	Brittany Bowe	United States
silver medal	Jutta Leerdam	Netherlands
bronze medal	Elizaveta Golubeva

The women's 1000 metres competition at the 2021 World Single Distances Speed Skating Championships was held on 13 February 2021.

== Results ==
The race was started at 15:17.

Rank	Pair	Lane	Name	Country	Time	Diff
1st place, gold medalist(s)	11	i	Brittany Bowe	United States	1:14.128	
2nd place, silver medalist(s)	11	o	Jutta Leerdam	Netherlands	1:14.672	+0.55
3rd place, bronze medalist(s)	12	i	Elizaveta Golubeva	Russian Skating Union	1:14.848	+0.72
4	9	o	Olga Fatkulina	Russian Skating Union	1:15.039	+0.91
5	10	i	Jorien ter Mors	Netherlands	1:15.273	+1.15
6	10	o	Angelina Golikova	Russian Skating Union	1:15.348	+1.22
7	8	o	Karolina Bosiek	Poland	1:15.794	+1.67
8	1	o	Suzanne Schulting	Netherlands	1:16.035	+1.91
9	7	i	Heather McLean	Canada	1:16.280	+2.16
10	9	i	Yekaterina Aydova	Kazakhstan	1:16.348	+2.22
11	7	o	Vanessa Herzog	Austria	1:16.457	+2.33
12	6	o	Béatrice Lamarche	Canada	1:16.666	+2.54
13	12	o	Natalia Czerwonka	Poland	1:16.668	+2.54
14	8	i	Kaylin Irvine	Canada	1:16.845	+2.72
15	4	i	Hanna Nifantava	Belarus	1:16.903	+2.78
16	5	i	Nikola Zdráhalová	Czech Republic	1:17.765	+3.64
17	6	i	Kaja Ziomek	Poland	1:17.859	+3.73
18	4	o	Ida Njåtun	Norway	1:17.867	+3.74
19	2	o	Katja Franzen	Germany	1:18.200	+4.08
20	5	o	Ekaterina Sloeva	Belarus	1:18.630	+4.51
21	3	o	Josephine Heimerl	Germany	1:19.122	+5.00
22	2	i	Stien Vanhoutte	Belgium	1:19.308	+5.18
23	1	i	Ellia Smeding	Great Britain	1:19.866	+5.74
24	3	i	Anna Ostlender	Germany	1:20.342	+6.22
