= 2023 World Single Distances Speed Skating Championships – Women's 1000 metres =

Women's 1000 metres at the 2023 World Single Distances Speed Skating Championships
- Venue: Thialf
- Location: Heerenveen, Netherlands
- Date: 4 March
- Competitors: 22 from 13 nations
- Winning time: 1:13.03

Medalists
gold medal	Jutta Leerdam	Netherlands
silver medal	Antoinette Rijpma-de Jong	Netherlands
bronze medal	Miho Takagi	Japan

The Women's 1000 metres competition at the 2023 World Single Distances Speed Skating Championships was held on 4 March 2023.

== Results ==
The race was started at 15:57.

Rank	Pair	Lane	Name	Country	Time	Diff
1st place, gold medalist(s)	12	i	Jutta Leerdam	Netherlands	1:13.03	
2nd place, silver medalist(s)	11	i	Antoinette Rijpma-de Jong	Netherlands	1:14.26	+1.23
3rd place, bronze medalist(s)	11	o	Miho Takagi	Japan	1:14.37	+1.34
4	12	o	Kimi Goetz	United States	1:14.48	+1.45
5	7	o	Brittany Bowe	United States	1:14.68	+1.65
6	10	i	Vanessa Herzog	Austria	1:15.12	+2.09
7	9	o	Yekaterina Aydova	Kazakhstan	1:15.26	+2.23
8	9	i	Ellia Smeding	Great Britain	1:15.28	+2.25
9	6	o	Erin Jackson	United States	1:15.63	+2.60
10	8	o	Michelle de Jong	Netherlands	1:15.67	+2.64
11	10	o	Kim Min-sun	South Korea	1:15.88	+2.85
12	7	i	Karolina Bosiek	Poland	1:16.27	+3.24
13	4	o	Han Mei	China	1:16.40	+3.37
14	3	i	Isabelle van Elst	Belgium	1:16.52	+3.49
15	8	i	Kim Hyun-yung	South Korea	1:16.68	+3.65
16	1	o	Alina Dauranova	Kazakhstan	1:16.74	+3.71
17	5	i	Li Qishi	China	1:16.76	+3.73
18	2	o	Maddison Pearman	Canada	1:17.20	+4.17
19	6	i	Kako Yamane	Japan	1:17.79	+4.76
20	3	o	Natalia Jabrzyk	Poland	1:18.06	+5.03
21	4	i	Lea Sophie Scholz	Germany	1:18.29	+5.26
22	5	o	Martine Ripsrud	Norway	1:18.33	+5.30
	1	i	Sumire Kikuchi	Japan	Did not start	
	2	i	Kaitlyn McGregor	Switzerland	Did not start	
