= Mayon (disambiguation) =

Mayon is an active stratovolcano on the island of Luzon in the Philippines.

Mayon may also refer to:

- Mayon, Cornwall, England
- Mayon Kuipers (born 1988), Dutch long track speed skater, gold medalist at the 2018 European Speed Skating Championships – Women's team sprint
- Thirumal (Krishna) in South India
- The Indus Kohistani language of Pakistan

== See also ==
- Mayong (disambiguation)
