= 2019 World Single Distances Speed Skating Championships – Women's team sprint =

Women's team sprint at the 2019 World Single Distances Speed Skating Championships
- Venue: Max Aicher Arena
- Location: Inzell, Germany
- Dates: 7 February
- Competitors: 21 from 7 nations
- Teams: 7
- Winning time: 1:26.28

Medalists
gold medal	Janine Smit; Jutta Leerdam; Letitia de Jong	Netherlands
silver medal	Kaylin Irvine; Heather McLean; Kali Christ	Canada
bronze medal	Angelina Golikova; Olga Fatkulina; Daria Kachanova	Russia

The Women's team sprint competition at the 2019 World Single Distances Speed Skating Championships was held on 7 February 2019.

== Results ==
The race was started at 16:00.

Rank	Pair	Lane	Country	Time	Diff
1st place, gold medalist(s)	4	s	Netherlands	1:26.28	
2nd place, silver medalist(s)	3	c	Canada	1:27.21	+0.93
3rd place, bronze medalist(s)	3	s	Russia	1:27.26	+0.98
4	4	c	Italy	1:28.18	+1.90
5	2	s	China	1:29.15	+2.87
6	2	c	South Korea	1:29.83	+3.55
7	1	s	Norway	1:30.56	+4.28

== Participants ==
Country	White	Red	Yellow	Bleu
Norway	Martine Ripsrud	Hege Bøkko	Anne Gulbrandsen	Sofie Karoline Haugen
China	Zhao Xin	Jin Jingzhu	Li Qishi	Tian Ruining
Korea	Kim Min-sun	Park Ji-woo	Kim Hyun-yung	–
Russia	Angelina Golikova	Olga Fatkoelina	Daria Katsjanova	Jekaterina Sjichova
Canada	Kaylin Irvine	Heather McLean	Kali Christ	Marsha Hudey
Netherlands	Janine Smit	Jutta Leerdam	Letitia de Jong	Sanneke de Neeling
Italy	Yvonne Daldossi	Francesca Bettrone	Noemi Bonazza	–
