= 2020 World Single Distances Speed Skating Championships – Women's 1000 metres =

Women's 1000 metres at the 2020 World Single Distances Speed Skating Championships
- Venue: Utah Olympic Oval
- Location: Salt Lake City, United States
- Dates: February 15
- Competitors: 24 from 11 nations
- Winning time: 1:11.84

Medalists
gold medal	Jutta Leerdam	Netherlands
silver medal	Olga Fatkulina	Russia
bronze medal	Miho Takagi	Japan

The Women's 1000 metres competition at the 2020 World Single Distances Speed Skating Championships was held on February 15, 2020.

== Results ==
The race was started at 14:26.

Rank	Pair	Lane	Name	Country	Time	Diff
1st place, gold medalist(s)	8	o	Jutta Leerdam	Netherlands	1:11.84	
2nd place, silver medalist(s)	10	o	Olga Fatkulina	Russia	1:12.33	+0.49
3rd place, bronze medalist(s)	11	o	Miho Takagi	Japan	1:12.34	+0.50
4	9	i	Ireen Wüst	Netherlands	1:12.64	+0.80
5	5	i	Kimi Goetz	United States	1:12.70	+0.86
6	12	o	Nao Kodaira	Japan	1:12.86	+1.02
7	6	i	Yekaterina Shikhova	Russia	1:12.88	+1.04
8	12	i	Brittany Bowe	United States	1:12.91	+1.07
9	7	i	Letitia de Jong	Netherlands	1:12.99	+1.15
10	10	i	Daria Kachanova	Russia	1:13.10	+1.26
11	11	i	Vanessa Herzog	Austria	1:13.84	+2.00
12	3	o	Brianna Bocox	United States	1:14.11	+2.27
13	7	o	Li Qishi	China	1:14.13	+2.29
14	8	i	Zhao Xin	China	1:14.18	+2.34
15	4	o	Arisa Go	Japan	1:14.36	+2.52
16	9	o	Natalia Czerwonka	Poland	1:14.45	+2.61
17	2	o	Huang Yu-ting	Chinese Taipei	1:14.64	+2.80
18	2	i	Karolina Bosiek	Poland	1:14.65	+2.81
19	4	i	Heather McLean	Canada	1:14.81	+2.97
20	6	o	Nikola Zdráhalová	Czech Republic	1:15.34	+3.50
21	1	i	Béatrice Lamarche	Canada	1:15.37	+3.53
22	3	i	Yin Qi	China	1:15.45	+3.61
23	5	o	Kim Min-sun	South Korea	1:15.63	+3.79
24	1	o	Abigail McCluskey	Canada	1:16.70	+4.86
