= 2025 World Single Distances Speed Skating Championships – Women's team sprint =

Women's team sprint at the 2025 World Single Distances Speed Skating Championships
- Venue: Vikingskipet
- Location: Hamar, Norway
- Dates: 13 March
- Competitors: 21 from 7 nations
- Teams: 7
- Winning time: 1:25.57

Medalists
gold medal	Jutta Leerdam; Suzanne Schulting; Angel Daleman	Netherlands
silver medal	Brooklyn McDougall; Béatrice Lamarche; Ivanie Blondin	Canada
bronze medal	Andżelika Wójcik; Kaja Ziomek-Nogal; Karolina Bosiek	Poland

The Women's team sprint competition at the 2025 World Single Distances Speed Skating Championships took place on 13 March 2025.

== Qualification ==
A total of eight entry quotas were available for the event, with a maximum of one per country. The entry quotas were assigned to countries following a Special Qualification Ranking List based on points and times during the 2024–25 ISU Speed Skating World Cup.

== Records ==
Prior to this competition, the existing world and track records were as follows.

	Time	Team	Date
World Record	1:24.02	Netherlands	13 February 2020
Track Record	1:27.42	Netherlands	5 March 2022

== Results ==
The race was started at 20:59.

Rank	Pair	Lane	Country	Time	Diff
1st place, gold medalist(s)	2	c	Netherlands; Jutta Leerdam; Suzanne Schulting; Angel Daleman	1:25.57; TR	
2nd place, silver medalist(s)	3	c	Canada; Brooklyn McDougall; Béatrice Lamarche; Ivanie Blondin	1:27.23	+1.66
3rd place, bronze medalist(s)	3	s	Poland; Andżelika Wójcik; Kaja Ziomek-Nogal; Karolina Bosiek	1:27.80	+2.23
4	4	c	Kazakhstan; Darja Vazhenina; Kristina Silaeva; Nadezhda Morozova	1:28.78	+3.21
5	1	s	China; Wang Jingziqian; Tian Ruining; Yin Qi	1:30.41	+4.84
6	2	s	Norway; Carina Jagtøyen; Julie Nistad Samsonsen; Aurora Løvås	1:30.59	+5.02
	4	s	Germany; Lea Sophie Scholz; Sophie Warmuth; Anna Ostlender	Did not finish	
