= 2022 European Speed Skating Championships – Women's team sprint =

Women's team sprint at the 2022 European Speed Skating Championships
- Venue: Thialf
- Location: Heerenveen, Netherlands
- Dates: 7 January
- Competitors: 12 from 4 nations
- Teams: 4
- Winning time: 1:27.26

Medalists
| gold medal | Andżelika Wójcik; Kaja Ziomek; Karolina Bosiek | Poland |
| silver medal | Yauheniya Varabyova; Hanna Nifantava; Ekaterina Sloeva | Belarus |
| bronze medal | Julie Nistad Samsonsen; Martine Ripsrud; Ane By Farstad | Norway |

The women's team sprint competition at the 2022 European Speed Skating Championships was held on 7 January 2022.

== Results ==
The race was started at 18:55.

| Rank | Pair | Lane | Country | Time | Diff |
|---|---|---|---|---|---|
| 1st place, gold medalist(s) | 2 | s | Poland; Andżelika Wójcik; Kaja Ziomek; Karolina Bosiek | 1:27.26 | |
| 2nd place, silver medalist(s) | 1 | c | Belarus; Yauheniya Varabyova; Hanna Nifantava; Ekaterina Sloeva | 1:31.18 | +3.92 |
| 3rd place, bronze medalist(s) | 2 | c | Norway; Julie Nistad Samsonsen; Martine Ripsrud; Ane By Farstad | 1:31.43 | +4.17 |
| 4 | 1 | s | Germany; Katja Franzen; Sophie Warmuth; Lea Sophie Scholz | 1:32.29 | +5.03 |
