= 2020 World Single Distances Speed Skating Championships – Women's team sprint =

Women's team sprint at the 2020 World Single Distances Speed Skating Championships
- Venue: Utah Olympic Oval
- Location: Salt Lake City, United States
- Dates: February 13
- Competitors: 12 from 4 nations
- Teams: 4
- Winning time: 1:24.02

Medalists
gold medal	Femke Kok; Jutta Leerdam; Letitia de Jong	Netherlands
silver medal	Angelina Golikova; Olga Fatkulina; Daria Kachanova	Russia
bronze medal	Andżelika Wójcik; Kaja Ziomek; Natalia Czerwonka	Poland

The Women's team sprint competition at the 2020 World Single Distances Speed Skating Championships was held on February 13, 2020.

== Results ==
The race was started at 15:20.

Rank	Pair	Lane	Country	Time	Diff
1st place, gold medalist(s)	1	c	Netherlands; Femke Kok; Jutta Leerdam; Letitia de Jong	1:24.02 WR	
2nd place, silver medalist(s)	2	c	Russia; Angelina Golikova; Olga Fatkulina; Daria Kachanova	1:24.50	+0.48
3rd place, bronze medalist(s)	2	s	Poland; Andżelika Wójcik; Kaja Ziomek; Natalia Czerwonka	1:25.37	+1.35
4	1	s	China; Tian Ruining; Jin Jingzhu; Zhao Xin	1:26.80	+2.78
