= Benjamin Donnelly =

Canadian speed skater

Personal information
- Born: August 22, 1996 (age 29) Ajax, Ontario, Canada
- Height: 190 cm (6 ft 3 in)
- Weight: 82 kg (181 lb)

Sport
- Country: Canada
- Sport: Speed skating

Achievements and titles
- Personal bests: 35.87=500 m 1.09:69=1,000 m 1.45:10=1,500 m 3.45:45=3,000 m 6.16.60=5,000 m
Medal record
World Junior Championships
Gold medal – first place	2016 Changchun	Overall
Gold medal – first place	2016 Changchun	1000 m
Gold medal – first place	2016 Changchun	5000 m
Silver medal – second place	2016 Changchun	1500 m
Silver medal – second place	2016 Changchun	Team Pursuit

Benjamin Donnelly (born August 22, 1996) is a Canadian speed skater. Donnelly was born in Ajax, but his hometown is the neighbouring city of Oshawa.

== Career ==
=== Junior ===
During the 2016 World Junior Speed Skating Championships held in Changchun, China, Donnelly won 5 medals (three gold). Donnelly won two individual gold medals, a silver in the team pursuit and 1500m and the overall title.

=== 2018 Winter Olympics ===
In January 2018, Donnelly was named to Canada's 2018 Olympic team.
