= Mayong =

Mayong may refer to:

- Mayong, Dongguan, China
- Mayong, Assam, India
- Mayong, a district in Jepara Regency, Central Java, Indonesia
- Ma-yong (Bouea macrophylla), a tropical fruit tree native to Southeast Asia

== See also ==
- Mayon (disambiguation)
