= 2016 World Junior Speed Skating Championships =

International speed skating competition

- Venue: Jilin Provincial Speed Skating Rink, Changchun, China
- Dates: 11–13 March

The 2016 World Junior Speed Skating Championships took place from 11 to 13 March 2016 in Changchun, China. They were the 43rd World Junior Speed Skating Championships.

== Medal summary ==
=== Men ===
| Event | Gold | | Silver | | Bronze | |
|---|---|---|---|---|---|---|
| Overall | Benjamin Donnelly (CAN) | 147.715 | Kim Min-seok (KOR) | 148.193 | Marcel Bosker (NED) | 150.028 |
| 500 m | Ignat Golovatsyuk (BLR) | 35.72 | Christopher Fiola (CAN) | 35.97 | Yang Tao (CHN) | 36.03 |
| 1000 m | Benjamin Donnelly (CAN) | 1:10.85 | Kim Min-seok (KOR) | 1:10.98 | Marten Liiv (EST) | 1:11.15 |
| 1500 m | Kim Min-seok (KOR) | 1:48.46 | Benjamin Donnelly (CAN) | 1:48.56 | Marcel Bosker (NED) | 1:50.28 |
| 5000 m | Benjamin Donnelly (CAN) | 6:33.84 | Kim Min-seok (KOR) | 6:35.20 | Chris Huizinga (NED) | 6:36.00 |
| Mass start | Kim Min-seok (KOR) | 30 pts | Christopher Fiola (CAN) | 20 pts | Benjamin Donnelly (CAN) | 10 pts |
| Team Pursuit | South Korea; Kim Min-seok; Oh Hyun-min; Park Ki-woong | 3:54.47 | Canada; Benjamin Donnelly; Christopher Fiola; Tyson Langelaar | 3:58.29 | China; Kahanbai Alemasi; Wu Yu; Zhang Chuan | 3:59.11 |
| Team Sprint | Russia; Alexander Tkatch; Viktor Mushtakov; Mikhail Kazelin | 1:23.09 | China; Gao Tingyu; Yang Tao; Alemasi Kahanbai | 1:24.84 | Belarus; Stanislav Ignatsenko; Yevgeny Bolgov; Ignat Golovatsyuk | 1:25.00 |

=== Women ===
| Event | Gold | | Silver | | Bronze | |
|---|---|---|---|---|---|---|
| Overall | Elizaveta Kazelina (RUS) | 161.816 | Han Mei (CHN) | 163.931 | Park Ji-woo (KOR) | 164.204 |
| 500 m | Daria Kachanova (RUS) | 39.09 | Kim Min-jo (KOR) | 39.55 | Elizaveta Kazelina (RUS) | 39.79 |
| 1000 m | Elizaveta Kazelina (RUS) | 1:18.30 | Daria Kachanova (RUS) | 1:19.25 | Han Mei (CHN) | 1:19.55 |
| 1500 m | Elizaveta Kazelina (RUS) | 2:00.68 | Esther Kiel (NED) | 2:02.24 | Béatrice Lamarche (CAN) | 2:02.48 |
| 3000 m | Elizaveta Kazelina (RUS) | 4:15.90 | Park Ji-woo (KOR) | 4:16.54 | Esther Kiel (NED) | 4:16.57 |
| Mass start | Ayano Sato (JPN) | 30 pts | Esther Kiel (NED) | 20 pts | Béatrice Lamarche (CAN) | 10 pts |
| Team Pursuit | Netherlands; Loes Adegeest; Esther Kiel; Femke Markus | 3:10.83 | South Korea; Park Cho-won; Park Ji-woo; Um Chae-lin | 3:12.38 | Japan; Moe Kitahara; Ayano Sato; Rio Yamada | 3:13.29 |
| Team Sprint | Russia; Vladlena Rogatkina; Daria Kachanova; Elizaveta Kazelina | 1:31.00 | Japan; Miku Asano; Rio Yamada; Ayano Sato | 1:31.45 | Poland; Andżelika Wójcik; Kaja Ziomek; Karolina Bosiek | 1:33.08 |
