= 2024 European Speed Skating Championships – Women's team sprint =

Women's team sprint at the 2024 European Speed Skating Championships
- Venue: Thialf
- Location: Heerenveen, Netherlands
- Dates: 5 January
- Competitors: 15 from 5 nations
- Teams: 5
- Winning time: 1:27.36

Medalists
gold medal	Marrit Fledderus; Femke Kok; Antoinette Rijpma-de Jong	Netherlands
silver medal	Andżelika Wójcik; Iga Wojtasik; Karolina Bosiek	Poland
bronze medal	Carina Jagtøyen; Julie Nistad Samsonsen; Martine Ripsrud	Norway

The women's team sprint competition at the 2024 European Speed Skating Championships was held on 5 January 2024.

== Results ==
The race was started at 19:35.

Rank	Pair	Lane	Country	Time	Diff
1st place, gold medalist(s)	3	c	Netherlands; Marrit Fledderus; Femke Kok; Antoinette Rijpma-de Jong	1:27.36	
2nd place, silver medalist(s)	2	s	Poland; Andżelika Wójcik; Iga Wojtasik; Karolina Bosiek	1:28.06	+0.70
3rd place, bronze medalist(s)	2	c	Norway; Carina Jagtøyen; Julie Nistad Samsonsen; Martine Ripsrud	1:28.83	+1.47
4	3	s	Germany; Anna Ostlender; Michelle Uhrig; Lea Sophie Scholz	1:29.62	+2.26
5	1	s	Czech Republic; Nikol Nepokojová; Lucie Korvasová; Zuzana Kuršová	1:35.44	+8.08
