= 2018 European Speed Skating Championships – Women's team sprint =

Women's team sprint at the 2018 European Speed Skating Championships
- Venue: Kolomna Speed Skating Center
- Location: Kolomna, Russia
- Dates: 7 January
- Competitors: 9 from 3 nations
- Teams: 3
- Winning time: 1:26.71

Medalists
gold medal	Angelina Golikova; Olga Fatkulina; Elizaveta Kazelina	Russia
silver medal	Mayon Kuipers; Sanneke de Neeling; Letitia de Jong	Netherlands
bronze medal	Martine Ripsrud; Anne Gulbrandsen; Sofie Karoline Haugen	Norway

The women's team sprint competition at the 2018 European Speed Skating Championships was held on 7 January 2018.

== Results ==
The race was started at 16:59.

Rank	Pair	Lane	Country	Time	Diff
1st place, gold medalist(s)	3	c	Russia; Angelina Golikova; Olga Fatkulina; Elizaveta Kazelina	1:26.71	
2nd place, silver medalist(s)	2	s	Netherlands; Mayon Kuipers; Sanneke de Neeling; Letitia de Jong	1:28.65	+1.94
3rd place, bronze medalist(s)	3	s	Norway; Martine Ripsrud; Anne Gulbrandsen; Sofie Karoline Haugen	1:31.88	+5.17
