= 2022 World Sprint Speed Skating Championships =

International speed skating competition

- Location: Hamar, Norway
- Venue: Vikingskipet
- Dates: 3–5 March

The 2022 World Sprint Speed Skating Championships were held at the Vikingskipet in Hamar, Norway, from 3 to 5 March 2022.

== Schedule ==
All times are local (UTC+1).

Date	Time	Event
3 March	17:30	500 m women
3 March	17:58	500 m men
3 March	18:39	1000 m women
3 March	19:23	1000 m men
4 March	17:30	500 m women
4 March	17:58	500 m men
4 March	18:39	1000 m women
4 March	19:23	1000 m men
5 March	17:57	Team sprint women
5 March	18:08	Team sprint men

== Medal summary ==
=== Medal table ===
* Host nation (Norway)

Rank	Nation	Gold	Silver	Bronze	Total
1	Netherlands	3	2	1	6
2	Norway*	1	0	2	3
3	Poland	0	2	0	2
4	Austria	0	0	1	1
Totals (4 entries)		4	4	4	12

=== Medalists ===
Event	Gold		Silver		Bronze	
Men	Thomas Krol; Netherlands	138.705	Kai Verbij; Netherlands	138.830	Håvard Holmefjord Lorentzen; Norway	139.375
Men's team sprint	Norway; Bjørn Magnussen; Henrik Fagerli Rukke; Håvard Holmefjord Lorentzen	1:20.01	Poland; Marek Kania; Piotr Michalski; Damian Żurek	1:20.80	Netherlands; Merijn Scheperkamp; Kai Verbij; Thomas Krol	1:20.81
Women	Jutta Leerdam; Netherlands	151.140	Femke Kok; Netherlands	151.215	Vanessa Herzog; Austria	152.225
Women's team sprint	Netherlands; Dione Voskamp; Jutta Leerdam; Femke Kok	1:27.42	Poland; Andżelika Wójcik; Kaja Ziomek; Karolina Bosiek	1:29.09	Norway; Julie Nistad Samsonsen; Martine Ripsrud; Marte Bjerkreim Furnée	1:34.92
