= Jutta Leerdam =

Dutch speed skater (born 1998)

Jutta Leerdam OLY
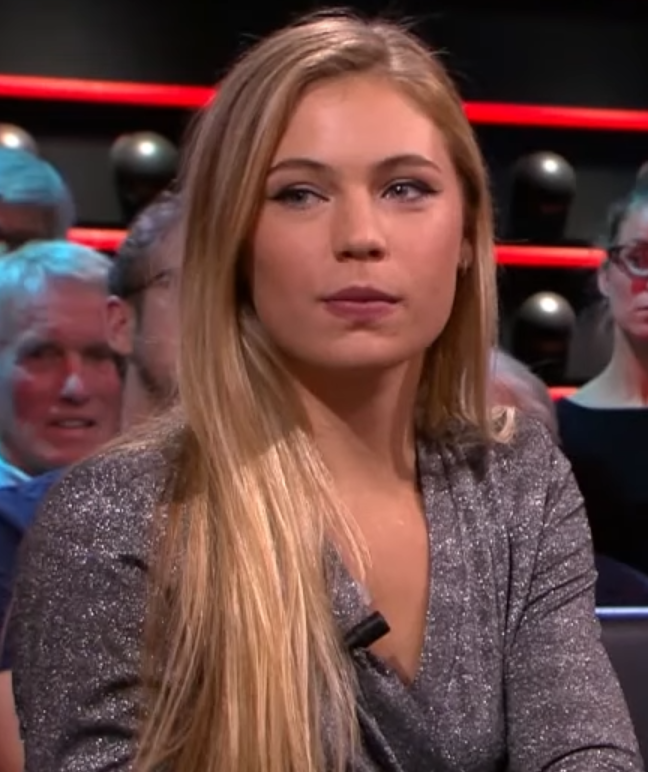
- Leerdam in 2018

Personal information
- Full name: Jutta Monica Leerdam
- Nationality: Dutch
- Born: 30 December 1998 (age 27) 's-Gravenzande, Netherlands
- Height: 1.81 m (5 ft 11 in)
- Weight: 73 kg (161 lb)
- Life partners: Jake Paul (2023–present; engaged)

Sport
- Country: Netherlands
- Sport: Speed skating
- Events: 500 m, 1500 m
- Club: Team KaFra (2024–)
- Turned pro: 2018
Medal record
Women's speed skating
Representing the Netherlands
Olympic Games
| Gold medal – first place | 2026 Milano Cortina | 1000 m |
| Silver medal – second place | 2022 Beijing | 1000 m |
| Silver medal – second place | 2026 Milano Cortina | 500 m |
World Single Distances Championships
| Gold medal – first place | 2019 Inzell | Team sprint |
| Gold medal – first place | 2020 Salt Lake City | 1000 m |
| Gold medal – first place | 2020 Salt Lake City | Team sprint |
| Gold medal – first place | 2023 Heerenveen | 1000 m |
| Gold medal – first place | 2025 Hamar | Team sprint |
| Silver medal – second place | 2021 Heerenveen | 1000 m |
| Silver medal – second place | 2025 Hamar | 500 m |
| Bronze medal – third place | 2023 Heerenveen | 500 m |
| Bronze medal – third place | 2024 Calgary | 1000 m |
| Bronze medal – third place | 2025 Hamar | 1000 m |
World Sprint Championships
| Gold medal – first place | 2022 Hamar | Sprint |
| Gold medal – first place | 2022 Hamar | Team sprint |
| Bronze medal – third place | 2024 Inzell | Sprint |
European Championships
| Gold medal – first place | 2020 Heerenveen | 1000 m |
| Gold medal – first place | 2021 Heerenveen | Sprint |
| Gold medal – first place | 2022 Heerenveen | 1000 m |
| Gold medal – first place | 2023 Hamar | Sprint |
| Gold medal – first place | 2024 Heerenveen | 1000 m |
| Gold medal – first place | 2025 Heerenveen | Sprint |
| Silver medal – second place | 2024 Heerenveen | 500 m |
World Junior Championships
| Gold medal – first place | 2017 Helsinki | Allround |
| Gold medal – first place | 2017 Helsinki | 1500m |
| Silver medal – second place | 2018 Utah | Allround |
| Bronze medal – third place | 2017 Helsinki | 500m |
| Bronze medal – third place | 2017 Helsinki | 3000m |

Jutta Monica Leerdam (pronounced [ˈjutaː ˈmoːnikaː leːrˈdɑm]; born 30 December 1998) is a Dutch speed skater specializing in long-track sprint events. She won the gold medal in the 1000 m event at the 2026 Milano Cortina Olympics, setting an Olympic record. She also won the silver medal in the 500 m event at the 2026 Olympics, as well as the silver medal in the 1000 m at the 2022 Beijing Olympics.

Leerdam is the 2022 World Sprint Champion in the 500 and 1000 metres combined. In the 1000 metres, she is the 2020 and 2023 World Single Distance Champion. In the team sprint, she is the 2019 and 2020 World Single Distance Champion and the 2022 World Sprint Champion.

== Early life and education ==
Leerdam grew up as the third child of Ruud Leerdam and his wife Monique in 's-Gravenzande in the Westland region. She has an older brother Kjeld, an older sister Merel and a younger sister Beaudine. Her father works in horticulture and is a second generation tomato farmer. She was named after the German windsurfing world champion Jutta Müller by her father, a windsurfing enthusiast.

As a child, Leerdam dealt with hyperactivity. As a result, her parents thought sport would help her to balance her energy levels. She started playing field hockey, gymnastics and tennis, but switched to speed skating at the suggestion of her father at the age of eleven.

Initially, she completed a HAVO certificate. She commenced studying Sport Marketing & Management at Rotterdam University of Applied Sciences, where she completed her first year, before transferring to study commercial economics at the Johan Cruyff Academy of the Hanze University of Applied Sciences in Groningen. She transferred there due to her move to Heerenveen. She dropped out of this programme after one semester to focus on her sports career.

== Career ==
Leerdam (2018)

Leerdam became the junior world champion at the 2017 World Junior Championships in Helsinki, Finland. The following year, at the 2018 Championships in Salt Lake City, United States, she finished second behind compatriot Joy Beune.

During the 2017–18 season, she won the ISU Junior World Cup competition in the 1000m and 1500m events. She also became the Dutch junior sprint champion. In 2018, she turned professional and became a member of Team IKO.

Since turning professional Leerdam won the 1000m world title twice (2020 and 2023), silver at that distance at the 2022 Winter Olympics and also the gold medal at the World Sprint Championships in 2022. Leerdam joined Team Jumbo-Visma in 2022.

At the 2026 Winter Olympics, Leerdam won gold with an Olympic record time of 1:12.31 in the women's 1000 meters event. She also won silver in the women's 500 meters event.

== Personal life ==
Leerdam was in a relationship with Dutch speed skater Koen Verweij from 2017 to 2022. Since 2023, she has been in a relationship with American social media personality and professional boxer Jake Paul. The couple publicly confirmed their relationship on 3 April 2023 after communicating over Instagram a few months earlier. On 22 March 2025, Leerdam and Paul announced their engagement on Instagram. Paul attended the 2026 Winter Olympics in Milan–Cortina where he cheered on Leerdam as she won gold in the 1000 meters.

Her second cousin Dione Voskamp is also a speed skater.

== Records ==
=== Personal records ===
Personal records
Speed skating
| Event | Result | Date | Location | Notes |
| 500 meter | 37.01 | 23 November 2025 | Olympic Oval, Calgary | |
| 1000 meter | 1:11.84 | 15 February 2020 | Utah Olympic Oval, Salt Lake City | Dutch record. |
| 1500 meter | 1:53.64 | 29 October 2021 | Thialf, Heerenveen | |
| 3000 meter | 4:05.19 | 10 March 2018 | Utah Olympic Oval, Salt Lake City | |

=== World record ===
| Nr. | Event | Result | Date | Location | Notes |
|---|---|---|---|---|---|
| 1. | Team sprint | 1:24.029 | 13 February 2020 | Utah Olympic Oval, Salt Lake City | With Letitia de Jong and Femke Kok |

=== Olympic record ===
| Nr. | Event | Result | Date | Location | Notes |
|---|---|---|---|---|---|
| 1. | Women's 1000 m | 1:12.31 | 09 February 2026 | Milano Speed Skating Stadium, Milan | |

== Tournament overview ==
| Season | Dutch Championships Single Distances | Dutch Championships Sprint | European Championships Single Distances | European Championships Sprint | World Championships Single Distances | World Championships Sprint | Olympic Games | World Cup GWC | World Championships Allround Junior | World Cup Junior |
|---|---|---|---|---|---|---|---|---|---|---|
| 2016–17 | HEERENVEEN 14th 500m 12th 1000m 15th 1500m | | | | | | | | HELSINKI (bronze) 500m (gold) 1500m 7th 1000m (bronze) 3000m (gold) overall (gold) team pursuit | |
| 2017–18 | HEERENVEEN 11th 500m 10th 1000m 14th 1500m | | | | | | | | SALT LAKE CITY (silver) 500m (silver) 1500m (silver) 1000m (silver) 3000m (silver) overall (gold) team pursuit (gold) team sprint | (silver) 500m (gold) 1000m (gold) 1500m (gold) overall |
| 2018–19 | HEERENVEEN (bronze) 500m (bronze) 1000m | HEERENVEEN (gold) 500m (gold) 1000m (silver) 500m (gold) 1000m (gold) overall | | COLLALBO 4th 500m (silver) 1000m 4th 500m (silver) 1000m 4th overall | INZELL 16th 500m 5th 1000m (gold) team sprint | HEERENVEEN 16th 500m 6th 1000m 15th 500m 4th 1000m 10th overall | | 20th 500m 15th 1000m | | |
| 2019–20 | HEERENVEEN (gold) 500m (gold) 1000m | | HEERENVEEN DNS 500m (gold) 1000m | | SALT LAKE CITY 8th 500m (gold) 1000m (gold) team sprint | HAMAR 15th 500m (silver) 1000m 7th 500m (silver) 1000m 5th overall | | 24th 500m 4th 1000m (gold) team sprint | | |
| 2020–21 | HEERENVEEN (silver) 500m (gold) 1000m | HEERENVEEN (silver) 500m (silver) 1000m (silver) 500m (gold) 1000m (gold) overall | | HEERENVEEN 4th 500m (silver) 1000m (bronze) 500m (gold) 1000m (gold) overall | HEERENVEEN 4th 500m (silver) 1000m | | | 28th 500m 18th 1000m | | |
| 2021–22 | HEERENVEEN (gold) 500m (gold) 1000m | | HEERENVEEN (gold) 1000m | | | HAMAR 5th 500m (gold) 1000m (silver) 500m (gold) 1000m (gold) overall | BEIJING 5th 500m (silver) 1000m | 20th 500m 15th 1000m | | |
| 2022–23 | HEERENVEEN (silver) 500m (gold) 1000m (bronze) 1500m | HEERENVEEN (silver) 500m (gold) 1000m (gold) 500m (gold) 1000m (gold) overall | | HAMAR (silver) 500m (gold) 1000m (gold) 500m (gold) 1000m (gold) overall | HEERENVEEN (bronze) 500m (gold) 1000m 7th 1500m | | | 4th 500m (silver) 1000m 22nd 1500m | | |
| 2023–24 | HEERENVEEN (silver) 500m (gold) 1000m 6th 1500m | | HEERENVEEN (silver) 500m (gold) 1000m | | CALGARY 6th 500m (bronze) 1000m | INZELL 5e 500m (gold) 1000m 5e 500m (gold) 1000m (bronze) overall | | | | |
| 2024–25 | HEERENVEEN (bronze) 500m (gold) 1000m | HEERENVEEN (silver) 500m (gold) 1000m (gold) 500m (gold) 1000m (gold) overall | | HEERENVEEN (silver) 500m (gold) 1000m (bronze) 500m (gold) 1000m (gold) overall | HAMAR (silver) 500m (bronze) 1000m (gold) team sprint | | | | | |
| 2025-26 | HEERENVEEN 6th 500m (bronze) 1000m | | | | | | MILANO CORTINA (silver) 500m (gold) 1000m | | | |

- Events for World Championship Junior Allround: 500m, 1500m, 1000m, 3000m
- Events for sprint championships: 500m, 1000m, 500m, 1000m

== World Cup overview ==
| Season | 500 meter | | | | | | | | | | |
|---|---|---|---|---|---|---|---|---|---|---|---|
| 2017–18 | 1st place, gold medalist(s) | 2nd place, silver medalist(s) | 2nd place, silver medalist(s) | Junior | | | | | | | |
| 2018–19 | 11th | 13th | 9th | 11th | 14th | 16th | 11th | – | – | – | – |
| 2019–20 | 12th | 8th | 11th | – | – | – | – | | | | |
| 2020–21 | 6th | – | – | – | | | | | | | |
| 2021–22 | 12th | 12th | 7th | 4th | 7th | 20th | | | | | |
| 2022–23 | 2nd place, silver medalist(s) | 3rd place, bronze medalist(s) | 3rd place, bronze medalist(s) | 5th | – | 3rd place, bronze medalist(s) | 20th | | | | |

| Season | 1000 meter | | | | | | |
|---|---|---|---|---|---|---|---|
| 2017–18 | 1st place, gold medalist(s) | 1st place, gold medalist(s) | 1st place, gold medalist(s) | Junior | | | |
| 2018–19 | 10th | 9th | 10th | 7th | – | – | – |
| 2019–20 | 4th | 6th | – | 9th | 1st place, gold medalist(s) | | |
| 2020–21 | 4th | – | | | | | |
| 2021–22 | 5th | 4th | 2nd place, silver medalist(s) | | | | |
| 2022–23 | 1st place, gold medalist(s) | 1st place, gold medalist(s) | 1st place, gold medalist(s) | 1st place, gold medalist(s) | – | 1st place, gold medalist(s) | |

| Season | 1500 meter | | | | | |
|---|---|---|---|---|---|---|
| 2017–18 | 1st place, gold medalist(s) | 1st place, gold medalist(s) | Junior | | | |
| 2018–19 | | | | | | |
| 2019–20 | | | | | | |
| 2020–21 | | | | | | |
| 2021–22 | | | | | | |
| 2022–23 | 10th | 8th | 7th | – | – | – |

| Season | Team sprint | | | |
|---|---|---|---|---|
| 2017–18 | | | | |
| 2018–19 | | | | |
| 2019–20 | 1st place, gold medalist(s) | 2nd place, silver medalist(s) | 1st place, gold medalist(s) | – |
| 2020–21 | | | | |
| 2021–22 | | | | |
| 2022–23 | | | | |
