= Brooklyn McDougall =

Canadian speed skater (born 1998)

Personal information
- Born: August 23, 1998 (age 28) Calgary, Alberta, Canada

Sport
- Country: Canada
- Sport: Speed skating
Medal record
Women's speed skating
Representing Canada
World Single Distances Championships
Gold medal – first place	2023 Heerenveen	Team sprint
Silver medal – second place	2025 Hamar	Team sprint
Four Continents Speed Skating Championships
Gold medal – first place	2020 Milwaukee	Team Sprint
Silver medal – second place	2020 Milwaukee	500 m

Brooklyn McDougall (born August 23, 1998) is a Canadian long track speed skater who specializes in the sprint distances.

== Career ==
McDougall's first senior competition came in 2020, when she won a gold in the women's team sprint and silver in the 500 m at the 2020 Four Continents Speed Skating Championships in Milwaukee, Wisconsin.

In February 2020, McDougall made her World Cup debut in Calgary.

In October 2021, McDougall won the 500 m event at the 2021 Canadian long-track speed-skating championships in her hometown with a time of 37.851, which was a new personal best.

In January 2022, McDougall was named to her first Olympic team, where she will contest the 500 m event.

== Personal records ==
Personal records
Speed skating
Event	Result	Date	Location	Notes
500 m	37.67	23 November 2025	Olympic Oval, Calgary	
1000 m	1:15.91	21 November 2025	Olympic Oval, Calgary	
1500 m	2:01.39	9 March 2018	Utah Olympic Oval, Salt Lake City	
3000 m	4:29.72	10 March 2018	Utah Olympic Oval, Salt Lake City	
