= Andżelika Wójcik =

Polish speed skater (born 1996)

Personal information
- Nationality: Polish
- Born: 8 November 1996 (age 29) Lubin, Poland
- Height: 1.60 m (5 ft 3 in)
- Weight: 58 kg (128 lb)

Sport
- Country: Poland
- Sport: Speed skating
- Event: Sprint
- Club: AZS AWF Katowice
Medal record
Women's speed skating
Representing Poland
World Single Distances Championships
Bronze medal – third place	2020 Salt Lake City	Team sprint
Bronze medal – third place	2024 Calgary	Team sprint
Bronze medal – third place	2025 Hamar	Team sprint
World Sprint Championships
Silver medal – second place	2022 Hamar	Team sprint
European Championships
Gold medal – first place	2022 Heerenveen	Team sprint
Silver medal – second place	2024 Heerenveen	Team sprint
Silver medal – second place	2026 Tomaszow Mazowiecki	500 m
Bronze medal – third place	2020 Heerenveen	Team sprint
World Junior Championships
Bronze medal – third place	2016 Changchun	Team sprint

Andżelika Wójcik (born 8 November 1996) is a Polish speed skater.

She won a medal at the 2020 World Single Distances Speed Skating Championships.
