= Kaja Ziomek-Nogal =

Polish speed skater (born 1997)

Kaja Ziomek
Personal information
- Nationality: Polish
- Born: 3 August 1997 (age 28) Lubin, Poland
- Height: 169 cm (5 ft 7 in)
- Weight: 63 kg (139 lb)

Sport
- Country: Poland
- Sport: Speed skating
- Event: Sprint
- Club: MKS Cuprum Lubin
Medal record
Women's speed skating
Representing Poland
World Single Distances Championships
Bronze medal – third place	2020 Salt Lake City	Team sprint
Bronze medal – third place	2025 Hamar	Team sprint
World Sprint Championships
Silver medal – second place	2022 Hamar	Team sprint
European Championships
Gold medal – first place	2022 Heerenveen	Team sprint
Gold medal – first place	2026 Tomaszów Mazowiecki	Team sprint
Gold medal – first place	2026 Tomaszow Mazowiecki	500 m
Bronze medal – third place	2020 Heerenveen	Team sprint
World Junior Championships
Bronze medal – third place	2016 Changchun	Team sprint

Kaja Ziomek (born 3 August 1997) is a Polish speed skater who is specialized in the sprint distances. She competed in the women's 500 metres at the 2018 Winter Olympics.

== Personal records ==
Personal records
Speed skating
Event	Result	Date	Location	Notes
500 m	37.08	11 December 2021	Olympic Oval, Calgary	
1000 m	1:14.88	11 December 2021	Olympic Oval, Calgary	
1500 m	2:08.69	30 October 2020	Tomaszów-Mazowiecki	
3000 m	4:56.33	4 February 2017	Zakopane	
