= Ellia Smeding =

British speed skater (born 1998)

Personal information
- Born: 16 March 1998 (age 28) Buckinghamshire, England
- Height: 1.74 m (5 ft 9 in)

Sport
- Country: Great Britain
- Sport: Speed skating
- Event(s): 1000m, 1500m

Ellia Smeding (born 16 March 1998) is a British long track speed skater. She represented Great Britain at the 2022 Winter Olympics.

== Career ==
She competed at the 2020 European Speed Skating Championships in Heerenveen, Netherlands. Racing in the 1000 meters, 1500 meters, and mass start events, she placed 14th, 18th, and 16th respectively. She participated in the 2022 Winter Olympics in Beijing, becoming the first female long track speed skater to represent Great Britain at the Olympics since 1980.

At the 2023 World Single Distances Speed Skating Championships, she finished 8th in the 1000 meters and 11th in the 1500 meters events.

She holds personal bests of 1:14.47 in the 1000 meters and 1:55.32 in the 1500 meters.

On 8 January 2026, it was announced Smeding had been selected to compete in the 2026 Winter Olympics, in the 500m, 1000m and 1500m. At the Games, she finished 25th in the 500m, 11th in the 1000m, and 23rd in the 1500m.

== Personal life ==
Born in Aylesbury in Buckinghamshire, England, Smeding spent her early childhood in Oxfordshire before her family temporarily moved to the Netherlands (her father is Dutch, her mother English) so the children could learn Dutch. They stayed there, and Smeding, already into rollerblading, acquired a passion for speed skating. She is in a relationship with fellow British-Dutch Olympic speed skater Cornelius Kersten; based in Heerenveen, the couple have a coffee brewing business which helps to fund their sporting lives.

In May 2025, it was announced that Smeding and partner Kersten had relocated to Canada to prepare for the upcoming Winter Olympics.
