= Julie Nistad Samsonsen =

Norwegian speed skater (born 2000)

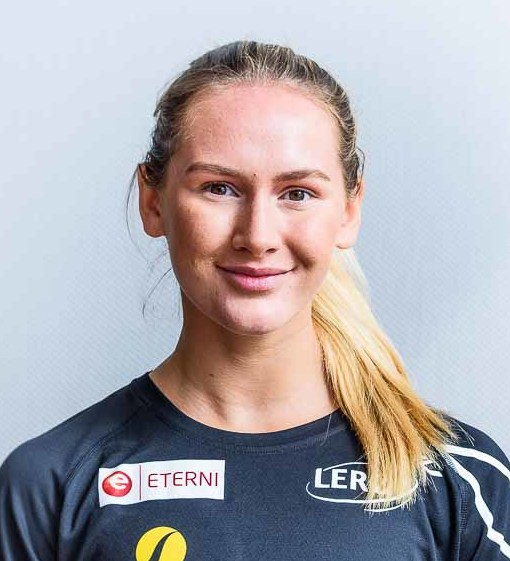
- Julie Nistad Samsonsen in August 2018

Personal information
- Nationality: Norwegian
- Born: 5 April 2000 (age 26) Bergen, Norway
- Height: 1.68 m (5 ft 6 in)

Sport
- Country: Norway
- Sport: Speed skating
- Club: Fana IL
Medal record
Women's speed skating
Representing Norway
World Sprint Championships
Bronze medal – third place	2022 Hamar	Team sprint
European Championships
Bronze medal – third place	2022 Heerenveen	Team sprint
Bronze medal – third place	2024 Heerenveen	Team sprint
World Junior Championships
Bronze medal – third place	2019 Baselga di Piné	Team sprint

Julie Nistad Samsonsen (born 5 April 2000) is a Norwegian speed skater. She competed at the 2022 Winter Olympics, in Women's 500 metres,

She competed at the 2019 World Junior Speed Skating Championships, 2021 European Speed Skating Championships, 2022 European Speed Skating Championships, and 2021–22 ISU Speed Skating World Cup.
