= Martine Ripsrud =

Norwegian speed skater (born 1995)

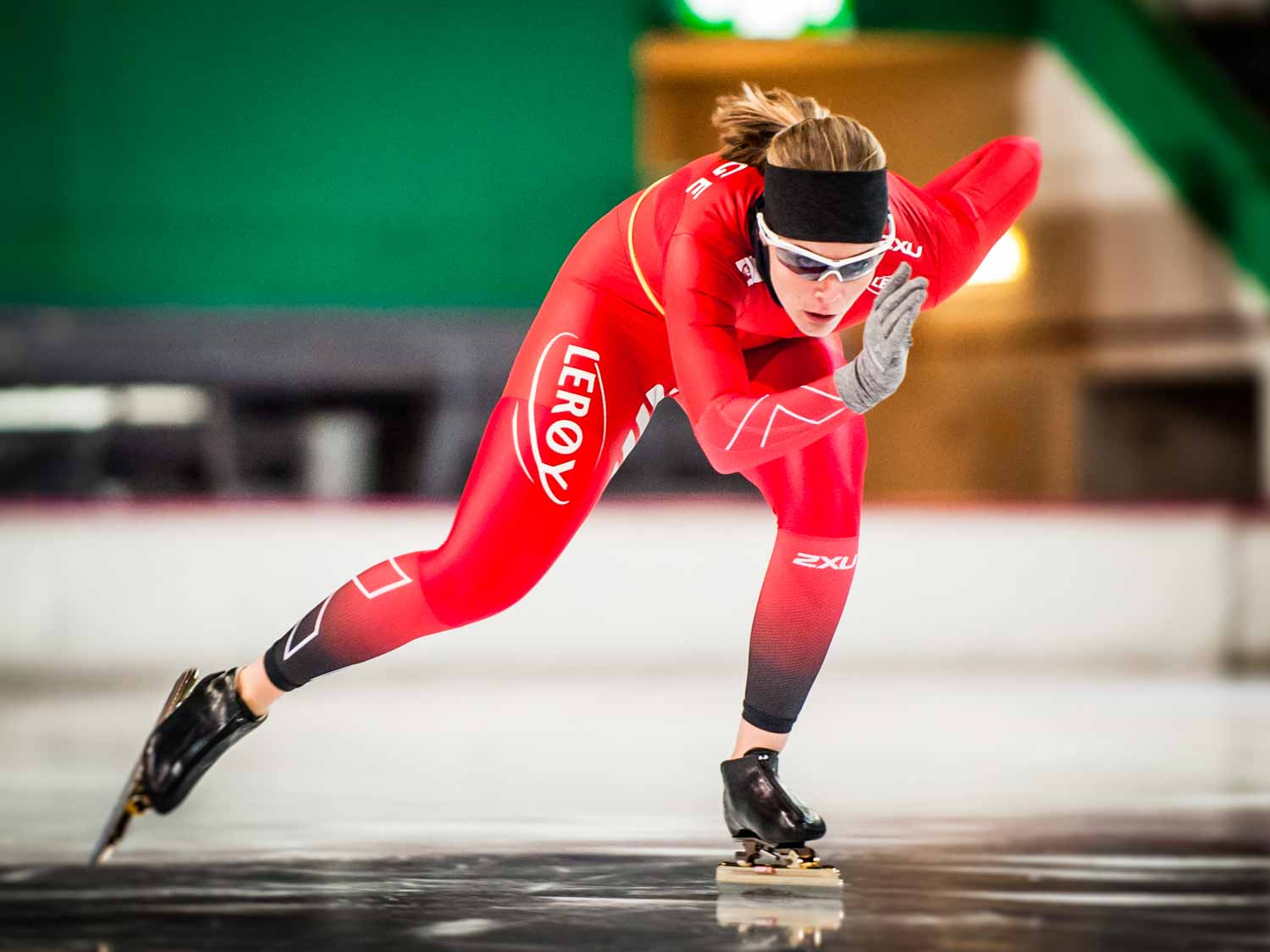
- Ripsrud in 2016

Personal information
- Born: 31 October 1995 (age 30) Hamar, Norway
- Height: 1.67 m (5 ft 6 in)

Sport
- Country: Norway
- Sport: Speed skating
- Club: Stange SK
Medal record
Women's speed skating
Representing Norway
World Sprint Championships
Bronze medal – third place	2022 Hamar	Team sprint
European Championships
Bronze medal – third place	2018 Kolomna	Team sprint
Bronze medal – third place	2022 Heerenveen	Team sprint
Bronze medal – third place	2024 Heerenveen	Team sprint

Martine Ripsrud (born 31 October 1995) is a Norwegian speed skater. She won a bronze medal in team sprint at the 2018 European Speed Skating Championships in Kolomna, Russia, along with Anne Gulbrandsen and Sofie Karoline Haugen. She competed at the World Sprint Speed Skating Championships in 2016, 2017 and 2018.
