= Karolina Bosiek =

Polish speed skater (born 2000)

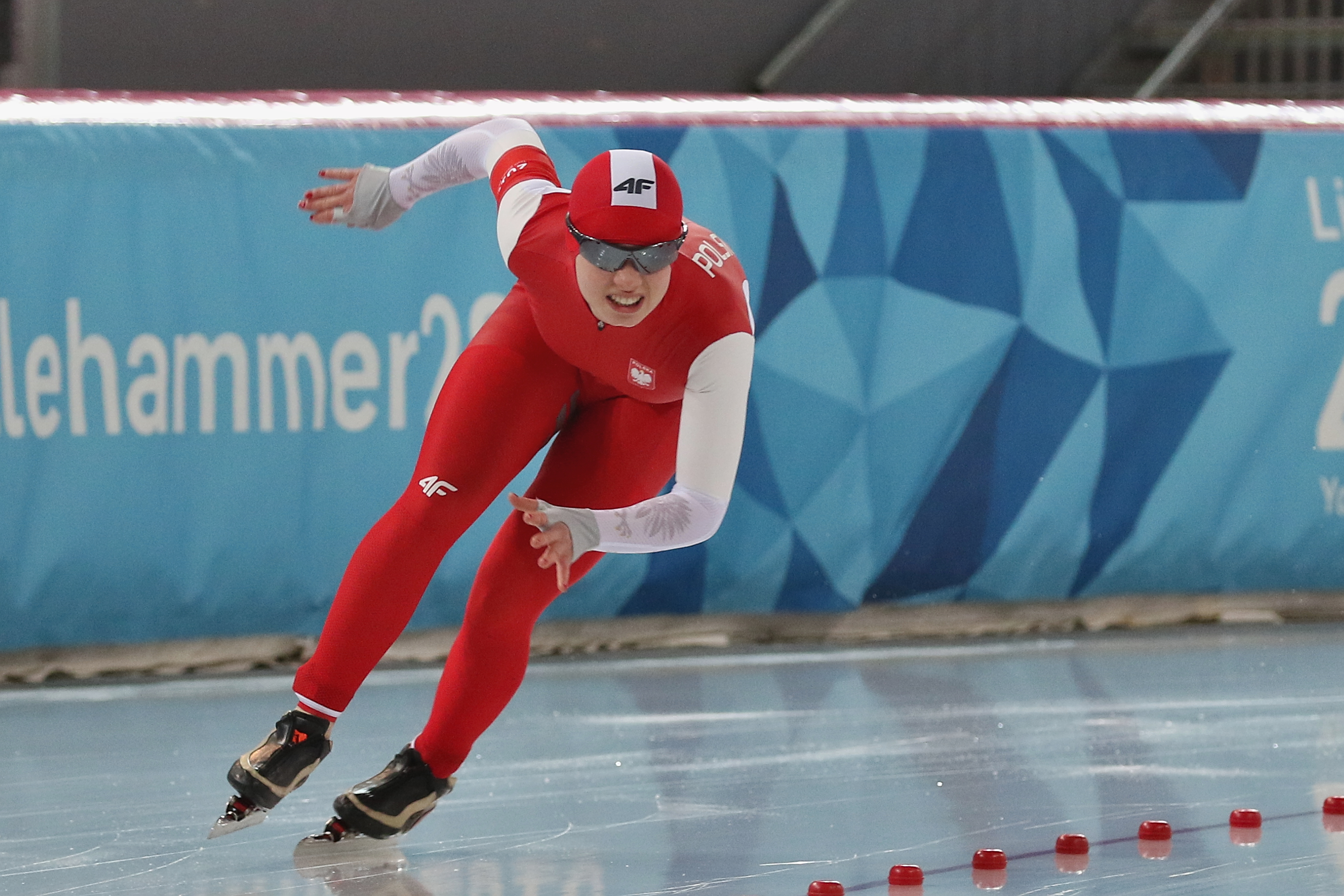
- Karolina Bosiek in 2016

Personal information
- Nationality: Polish
- Born: 20 February 2000 (age 26) Tomaszów Mazowiecki, Poland
- Height: 1.65 m (5 ft 5 in)
- Weight: 55 kg (121 lb)

Sport
- Country: Poland
- Sport: Speed skating
- Club: KS Pilica Tomaszow Mazowiecki
Medal record
Women's speed skating
Representing Poland
World Single Distances Championships
Bronze medal – third place	2024 Calgary	Team sprint
Bronze medal – third place	2025 Hamar	Team sprint
World Sprint Championships
Silver medal – second place	2022 Hamar	Team sprint
European Championships
Gold medal – first place	2022 Heerenveen	Team sprint
Gold medal – first place	2026 Tomaszów Mazowiecki	Team sprint
Silver medal – second place	2024 Heerenveen	Team sprint
World Junior Championships
Bronze medal – third place	2018 Salt Lake City	Mass start
Silver medal – second place	2019 Baselga di Piné	1500m
Silver medal – second place	2019 Baselga di Piné	Allround
Bronze medal – third place	2016 Changchun	Team sprint
Bronze medal – third place	2018 Salt Lake City	Team sprint
Bronze medal – third place	2019 Baselga di Piné	1000m
Bronze medal – third place	2019 Baselga di Piné	3000m

Karolina Bosiek (born 20 February 2000) is a Polish speed skater. She competed in the women's 3000 metres at the 2018 Winter Olympics.

== Career ==
In 2019, she won silver medals in the 1500 meters event and the general classification, as well as bronze medals in the 1000 meters and the 3000 meters events at the World Junior Speed Skating Championships held in Baselga di Pine, Italy.
