= 2020 European Speed Skating Championships – Women's 500 metres =

Women's 500 metres at the 2020 European Speed Skating Championships
- Venue: Thialf
- Location: Heerenveen, Netherlands
- Dates: 11 January
- Competitors: 18 from 10 nations
- Winning time: 37.40

Medalists
gold medal	Olga Fatkulina	Russia
silver medal	Vanessa Herzog	Austria
bronze medal	Angelina Golikova	Russia

The women's 500 metres competition at the 2020 European Speed Skating Championships was held on 11 January 2020.

== Results ==
The race was started at 13:40.

Rank	Pair	Lane	Name	Country	Time	Diff
1st place, gold medalist(s)	10	i	Olga Fatkulina	Russia	37.40	
2nd place, silver medalist(s)	8	i	Vanessa Herzog	Austria	37.49	+0.09
3rd place, bronze medalist(s)	8	o	Angelina Golikova	Russia	37.50	+0.10
4	4	i	Femke Kok	Netherlands	37.66	+0.26
5	9	o	Daria Kachanova	Russia	37.71	+0.31
6	6	i	Letitia de Jong	Netherlands	38.19	+0.79
7	10	o	Kaja Ziomek	Poland	38.46	+1.06
8	5	i	Andżelika Wójcik	Poland	38.78	+1.38
9	5	o	Hanna Nifantava	Belarus	38.92	+1.52
10	7	o	Julie Nistad Samsonsen	Norway	39.05	+1.65
11	7	i	Nikola Zdráhalová	Czech Republic	39.34	+1.94
12	4	o	Ida Njåtun	Norway	39.39	+1.99
13	3	i	Hege Bøkko	Norway	39.51	+2.11
14	3	o	Stien Vanhoutte	Belgium	39.52	+2.12
15	6	o	Katja Franzen	Germany	39.66	+2.26
16	2	o	Mihaela Hogaş	Romania	40.26	+2.86
17	1	i	Lea Sophie Scholz	Germany	40.43	+3.03
18	2	i	Yeugeniya Vorobyova	Belarus	40.70	+3.30
	9	i	Jutta Leerdam	Netherlands	Did not start	
