= 2022 European Speed Skating Championships – Women's 1000 metres =

Women's 1000 metres at the 2022 European Speed Skating Championships
- Venue: Thialf
- Location: Heerenveen, Netherlands
- Dates: 9 January
- Competitors: 20 from 10 nations
- Winning time: 1:13.60

Medalists
gold medal	Jutta Leerdam	Netherlands
silver medal	Femke Kok	Netherlands
bronze medal	Daria Kachanova	Russia

The women's 1000 metres competition at the 2022 European Speed Skating Championships was held on 9 January 2022.

== Results ==
The race was started at 15:22.

Rank	Pair	Lane	Name	Country	Time	Diff
1st place, gold medalist(s)	9	i	Jutta Leerdam	Netherlands	1:13.60	
2nd place, silver medalist(s)	1	o	Femke Kok	Netherlands	1:14.80	+1.20
3rd place, bronze medalist(s)	10	i	Daria Kachanova	Russia	1:14.94	+1.34
4	10	o	Angelina Golikova	Russia	1:15.542	+1.94
5	9	o	Elizaveta Golubeva	Russia	1:15.547	+1.94
6	5	i	Michelle de Jong	Netherlands	1:15.68	+2.08
7	7	o	Karolina Bosiek	Poland	1:16.76	+3.16
8	6	o	Ellia Smeding	Great Britain	1:16.85	+3.25
9	3	i	Michelle Uhrig	Germany	1:18.05	+4.45
10	7	i	Lea Sophie Scholz	Germany	1:18.21	+4.61
11	5	o	Martine Ripsrud	Norway	1:18.27	+4.67
12	3	o	Katja Franzen	Germany	1:18.48	+4.88
13	8	o	Hanna Nifantava	Belarus	1:18.59	+4.99
14	4	i	Kaitlyn McGregor	Switzerland	1:19.06	+5.46
15	4	o	Mihaela Hogaş	Romania	1:19.09	+5.49
16	6	i	Julie Nistad Samsonsen	Norway	1:19.16	+5.56
17	2	o	Ane By Farstad	Norway	1:20.06	+6.46
18	1	i	Zuzana Kuršová	Czech Republic	1:20.46	+6.86
19	2	i	Vera Güntert	Switzerland	1:21.47	+7.87
	8	i	Ekaterina Sloeva	Belarus	Did not start	
