= 2021 European Speed Skating Championships =

International speed skating competition

- Venue: Thialf, Heerenveen, Netherlands
- Dates: 16–17 January
- Competitors: 76 from 16 nations

Medalist men
1st place, gold medalist(s)		Patrick Roest	NED
1st place, gold medalist(s)		Thomas Krol	NED
2nd place, silver medalist(s)		Marcel Bosker	NED
2nd place, silver medalist(s)		Hein Otterspeer	NED
3rd place, bronze medalist(s)		Sverre Lunde Pedersen	NOR
3rd place, bronze medalist(s)		Joel Dufter	GER

Medalist women
1st place, gold medalist(s)		Antoinette de Jong	NED
1st place, gold medalist(s)		Jutta Leerdam	NED
2nd place, silver medalist(s)		Irene Schouten	NED
2nd place, silver medalist(s)		Angelina Golikova	RUS
3rd place, bronze medalist(s)		Martina Sáblíková	CZE
3rd place, bronze medalist(s)		Femke Kok	NED

The 2021 European Speed Skating Championships took place in Heerenveen, Netherlands from 16 to 17 January 2021. It was the third time that the allround and sprint tournaments had taken place at the same time and venue.

== Schedule ==
All times are local (UTC+1).

Date	Time	Allround	Time	Sprint
16 January	11:30	500m women 500m men 3000m women 5000m men	15:35	1st 500m women 1st 500m men 1st 1000m women 1st 1000m men
17 January	11:30	1500m women 1500m men 5000m women 10000m men	15:29	2nd 500m women 2nd 500m men 2nd 1000m women 2nd 1000m men

== Medal table ==
* Host nation (Netherlands)

Rank	Nation	Gold	Silver	Bronze	Total
1	Netherlands*	4	3	1	8
2	Russia	0	1	0	1
3	Czech Republic	0	0	1	1
3	Germany	0	0	1	1
3	Norway	0	0	1	1
Totals (5 entries)		4	4	4	12

== Allround ==
=== Men's championships ===
==== Day 1 ====
===== 500 metres =====
Rank	Skater	Nat.	Time	Behind	Points
1	Sverre Lunde Pedersen	(Norway)	36.25		36.250
2	Patrick Roest	(Netherlands)	36.39	+0.14	36.390
3	Hallgeir Engebråten	(Norway)	36.67	+0.42	36.670
4	Daniil Aldoshkin	(Russia)	36.70	+0.45	36.700
5	Gabriel Odor	(Austria)	36.74	+0.49	36.740
6	Peder Kongshaug	(Norway)	36.79	+0.54	36.790
7	Marcel Bosker	(Netherlands)	36.86	+0.61	36.860
8	Bart Swings	(Belgium)	36.94	+0.69	36.940
9	Livio Wenger	(Switzerland)	37.10	+0.85	37.100
10	Andrea Giovannini	(Italy)	37.19	+0.94	37.190
11	Szymon Pałka	(Poland)	37.26	+1.01	37.260
12	Sergey Trofimov	(Russia)	37.52	+1.27	37.520
13	Artur Janicki	(Poland)	37.64	+1.39	37.640
14	Ruslan Zakharov	(Russia)	37.85	+1.60	37.850
15	Konstantin Götze	(Germany)	37.88	+1.63	37.880
16	Evgeniy Bolgov	(Belarus)	37.89	+1.64	37.890
17	Marwin Talsma	(Netherlands)	37.96	+1.71	37.960
18	Philip Due Schmidt	(Denmark)	38.11	+1.86	38.110
19	Nils van der Poel	(Sweden)	38.19	+1.94	38.190
20	Michele Malfatti	(Italy)	39.11	+2.86	39.110

===== 5000 metres =====
Rank	Skater	Nat.	Time	Behind	Points
1	Patrick Roest	(Netherlands)	6:10.25		37.025
2	Nils van der Poel	(Sweden)	6:13.03	+2.78	37.303
3	Marcel Bosker	(Netherlands)	6:15.81	+5.56	37.581
4	Marwin Talsma	(Netherlands)	6:17.12	+6.87	37.712
5	Sergey Trofimov	(Russia)	6:17.60	+7.35	37.760
6	Bart Swings	(Belgium)	6:19.73	+9.48	37.973
7	Sverre Lunde Pedersen	(Norway)	6:19.97	+9.72	37.997
8	Hallgeir Engebråten	(Norway)	6:22.24	+11.99	38.224
9	Andrea Giovannini	(Italy)	6:24.86	+14.61	38.486
10	Michele Malfatti	(Italy)	6:26.22	+15.97	38.622
11	Daniil Aldoshkin	(Russia)	6:26.93	+16.68	38.693
12	Ruslan Zakharov	(Russia)	6:27.82	+17.57	38.782
13	Livio Wenger	(Switzerland)	6:28.43	+18.18	38.843
14	Szymon Pałka	(Poland)	6:32.86	+22.61	39.286
15	Gabriel Odor	(Austria)	6:38.02	+27.77	39.802
16	Philip Due Schmidt	(Denmark)	6:38.36	+28.11	39.836
17	Konstantin Götze	(Germany)	6:38.52	+28.27	39.852
18	Artur Janicki	(Poland)	6:38.64	+28.39	39.864
19	Peder Kongshaug	(Norway)	6:41.38	+31.13	40.138
20	Evgeniy Bolgov	(Belarus)	6:47.98	+37.73	40.798

==== Day 2 ====
===== 1500 metres =====
Rank	Skater	Nat.	Time	Behind	Points
1	Patrick Roest	(Netherlands)	1:45.53		35.176
2	Hallgeir Engebråten	(Norway)	1:46.14	+0.61	35.380
3	Sverre Lunde Pedersen	(Norway)	1:46.20	+0.67	35.400
4	Marcel Bosker	(Netherlands)	1:46.66	+1.13	35.553
5	Bart Swings	(Belgium)	1:47.11	+1.58	35.703
6	Sergey Trofimov	(Russia)	1:47.37	+1.84	35.790
7	Gabriel Odor	(Austria)	1:47.46	+1.93	35.820
8	Livio Wenger	(Switzerland)	1:47.60	+2.07	35.866
9	Daniil Aldoshkin	(Russia)	1:47.98	+2.45	35.993
10	Peder Kongshaug	(Norway)	1:48.02	+2.49	36.006
11	Andrea Giovannini	(Italy)	1:48.18	+2.65	36.060
12	Marwin Talsma	(Netherlands)	1:48.66	+3.13	36.220
13	Ruslan Zakharov	(Russia)	1:48.89	+3.36	36.296
14	Nils van der Poel	(Sweden)	1:49.60	+4.07	36.533
15	Szymon Pałka	(Poland)	1:49.86	+4.33	36.620
16	Michele Malfatti	(Italy)	1:50.11	+4.58	36.703
17	Konstantin Götze	(Germany)	1:50.73	+5.20	36.910
18	Evgeniy Bolgov	(Belarus)	1:51.61	+6.08	37.203
19	Philip Due Schmidt	(Denmark)	1:52.24	+6.71	37.413
20	Artur Janicki	(Poland)	1:52.42	+6.89	37.473

===== 10,000 metres =====
Rank	Skater	Nat.	Time	Behind	Points
1	Nils van der Poel	(Sweden)	12:42.80		38.140
2	Marwin Talsma	(Netherlands)	13:01.07	+18.27	39.053
3	Patrick Roest	(Netherlands)	13:03.08	+20.28	39.154
4	Marcel Bosker	(Netherlands)	13:16.25	+33.45	39.812
5	Hallgeir Engebråten	(Norway)	13:17.97	+35.17	39.898
6	Bart Swings	(Belgium)	13:18.08	+35.28	39.904
7	Sergey Trofimov	(Russia)	13:20.53	+37.73	40.026
8	Sverre Lunde Pedersen	(Norway)	13:23.63	+40.83	40.181

==== Final ranking ====
Rank	Skater	Nat.	500 m	5000 m	1500 m	10,000 m	Points	Behind
1st place, gold medalist(s)	Patrick Roest	(Netherlands)	36.39 (2)	6:10.25 (1)	1:45.53 (1)	13:03.08 (3)	147.745	
2nd place, silver medalist(s)	Marcel Bosker	(Netherlands)	36.86 (7)	6:15.81 (3)	1:46.66 (4)	13:16.25 (4)	149.806	+2.061
3rd place, bronze medalist(s)	Sverre Lunde Pedersen	(Norway)	36.35 (1)	6:19.97 (7)	1:46.20 (3)	13:23.63 (8)	149.828	+2.083
4	Nils van der Poel	(Sweden)	38.19 (19)	6:13.03 (2)	1:49.60 (14)	12:42.80 (1)	150.166	+2.421
5	Hallgeir Engebråten	(Norway)	36.67 (3)	6:22.24 (8)	1:46.14 (2)	13:17.97 (5)	150.172	+2.427
6	Bart Swings	(Belgium)	36.94 (8)	6:19.73 (6)	1:47.11 (5)	13:18.08 (6)	150.520	+2.775
7	Marwin Talsma	(Netherlands)	37.96 (17)	6:17.12 (4)	1:48.66 (12)	13:01.07 (2)	150.945	+3.200
8	Sergey Trofimov	(Russia)	37.52 (12)	6:17.60 (5)	1:47.37 (6)	13:20.53 (7)	151.096	+3.351
9	Daniil Aldoshkin	(Russia)	36.70 (4)	6:26.93 (11)	1:47.98 (9)	—N/a	111.386	—N/a
10	Andrea Giovannini	(Italy)	37.19 (10)	6:24.86 (9)	1:48.18 (11)	—N/a	111.736	—N/a
11	Livio Wenger	(Switzerland)	37.10 (9)	6:28.43 (13)	1:47.60 (8)	—N/a	111.809	—N/a
12	Gabriel Odor	(Austria)	36.74 (5)	6:38.02 (15)	1:47.46 (7)	—N/a	112.362	—N/a
13	Ruslan Zakharov	(Russia)	37.85 (14)	6:27.82 (12)	1:48.89 (13)	—N/a	112.928	—N/a
14	Peder Kongshaug	(Norway)	36.79 (6)	6:41.38 (19)	1:48.02 (10)	—N/a	112.934	—N/a
15	Szymon Pałka	(Poland)	37.26 (11)	6:32.86 (14)	1:49.86 (15)	—N/a	113.166	—N/a
16	Michele Malfatti	(Italy)	39.11 (20)	6:26.22 (10)	1:50.11 (16)	—N/a	114.435	—N/a
17	Konstantin Götze	(Germany)	37.88 (15)	6:38.52 (17)	1:50.73 (17)	—N/a	114.642	—N/a
18	Artur Janicki	(Poland)	37.64 (13)	6:38.64 (18)	1:52.42 (20)	—N/a	114.977	—N/a
19	Philip Due Schmidt	(Denmark)	38.11 (18)	6:38.36 (16)	1:52.24 (19)	—N/a	115.359	—N/a
20	Evgeniy Bolgov	(Belarus)	37.89 (16)	6:47.98 (20)	1:51.61 (18)	—N/a	115.891	—N/a

=== Women's championships ===
==== Day 1 ====
===== 500 metres =====
Rank	Skater	Nat.	Time	Behind	Points
1	Karolina Bosiek	(Poland)	38.68		38.680
2	Elizaveta Golubeva	(Russia)	38.84	+0.16	38.840
3	Antoinette de Jong	(Netherlands)	38.89	+0.21	38.890
4	Nikola Zdráhalová	(Czech Republic)	39.40	+0.72	39.400
5	Ida Njåtun	(Norway)	39.61	+0.93	39.610
6	Francesca Lollobrigida	(Italy)	39.64	+0.96	39.640
7	Joy Beune	(Netherlands)	39.78	+1.10	39.780
8	Natalia Czerwonka	(Poland)	39.86	+1.18	39.860
8	Evgeniia Lalenkova	(Russia)	39.86	+1.18	39.860
8	Irene Schouten	(Netherlands)	39.86	+1.18	39.860
11	Martina Sáblíková	(Czech Republic)	39.89	+1.21	39.890
12	Natalya Voronina	(Russia)	39.91	+1.23	39.910
13	Ragne Wiklund	(Norway)	40.00	+1.32	40.000
14	Ekaterina Sloeva	(Belarus)	40.31	+1.63	40.310
15	Linda Rossi	(Italy)	40.47	+1.79	40.470
16	Mareike Thum	(Germany)	40.63	+1.95	40.630
17	Sofie Karoline Haugen	(Norway)	41.32	+2.64	41.320
18	Leia Behlau	(Germany)	41.34	+2.66	41.340
19	Kristiine Kalev	(Estonia)	41.89	+3.21	41.890
20	Magdalena Czyszczoń	(Poland)	42.33	+3.65	42.330

===== 3000 metres =====
Rank	Skater	Nat.	Time	Behind	Points
1	Irene Schouten	(Netherlands)	3:57.95		39.658
2	Natalya Voronina	(Russia)	3:58.62	+0.67	39.770
3	Antoinette de Jong	(Netherlands)	4:02.19	+4.24	40.365
4	Martina Sáblíková	(Czech Republic)	4:02.31	+4.36	40.385
5	Joy Beune	(Netherlands)	4:03.18	+5.23	40.530
6	Ragne Wiklund	(Norway)	4:04.38	+6.43	40.730
7	Evgeniia Lalenkova	(Russia)	4:05.51	+7.56	40.918
8	Elizaveta Golubeva	(Russia)	4:06.09	+8.14	41.015
9	Francesca Lollobrigida	(Italy)	4:07.03	+9.08	41.171
10	Sofie Karoline Haugen	(Norway)	4:09.35	+11.40	41.558
11	Nikola Zdráhalová	(Czech Republic)	4:10.47	+12.52	41.745
12	Ida Njåtun	(Norway)	4:10.67	+12.72	41.778
13	Natalia Czerwonka	(Poland)	4:12.19	+14.24	42.031
14	Ekaterina Sloeva	(Belarus)	4:14.88	+16.93	42.480
15	Mareike Thum	(Germany)	4:15.91	+17.96	42.651
16	Karolina Bosiek	(Poland)	4:16.51	+18.56	42.751
17	Magdalena Czyszczoń	(Poland)	4:16.72	+18.77	42.786
18	Linda Rossi	(Italy)	4:16.86	+18.91	42.810
19	Leia Behlau	(Germany)	4:17.00	+19.05	42.833
20	Kristiine Kalev	(Estonia)	4:27.88	+29.93	44.646

==== Day 2 ====
===== 1500 metres =====
Rank	Skater	Nat.	Time	Behind	Points
1	Antoinette de Jong	(Netherlands)	1:54.83		38.276
2	Evgeniia Lalenkova	(Russia)	1:55.49	+0.66	38.496
3	Joy Beune	(Netherlands)	1:55.89	+1.06	38.630
4	Martina Sáblíková	(Czech Republic)	1:56.17	+1.34	38.723
5	Elizaveta Golubeva	(Russia)	1:56.64	+1.81	38.880
6	Nikola Zdráhalová	(Czech Republic)	1:56.87	+2.04	38.956
7	Ragne Wiklund	(Norway)	1:56.94	+2.10	38.980
8	Irene Schouten	(Netherlands)	1:57.00	+2.17	39.000
9	Ida Njåtun	(Norway)	1:57.31	+2.48	39.103
10	Natalia Czerwonka	(Poland)	1:57.74	+2.91	39.246
11	Natalya Voronina	(Russia)	1:58.66	+3.83	39.553
12	Francesca Lollobrigida	(Italy)	1:58.86	+4.03	39.620
13	Karolina Bosiek	(Poland)	1:59.04	+4.21	39.680
14	Ekaterina Sloeva	(Belarus)	2:00.53	+5.70	40.176
15	Sofie Karoline Haugen	(Norway)	2:00.78	+5.95	40.260
16	Mareike Thum	(Germany)	2:01.10	+6.27	40.366
17	Leia Behlau	(Germany)	2:01.31	+6.48	40.436
18	Linda Rossi	(Italy)	2:02.50	+7.67	40.833
19	Kristiine Kalev	(Estonia)	2:09.74	+14.91	43.246
20	Magdalena Czyszczoń	(Poland)	2:27.28	+32.45	49.093

===== 5000 metres =====
Rank	Skater	Nat.	Time	Behind	Points
1	Martina Sáblíková	(Czech Republic)	6:53.22		41.322
2	Irene Schouten	(Netherlands)	6:55.38	+2.16	41.538
3	Antoinette de Jong	(Netherlands)	6:57.72	+4.50	41.772
4	Natalya Voronina	(Russia)	7:00.67	+7.45	42.067
5	Joy Beune	(Netherlands)	7:06.79	+13.57	42.679
6	Ragne Wiklund	(Norway)	7:09.04	+15.82	42.904
7	Elizaveta Golubeva	(Russia)	7:19.16	+25.94	43.916
8	Evgeniia Lalenkova	(Russia)	7:27.34	+34.12	44.734

==== Final ranking ====
Rank	Skater	Nat.	500 m	3000 m	1500 m	5000 m	Points	Behind
1st place, gold medalist(s)	Antoinette de Jong	(Netherlands)	38.89 (3)	4:02.19 (3)	1:54.83 (1)	6:57.72 (3)	159.303	
2nd place, silver medalist(s)	Irene Schouten	(Netherlands)	39.86 (8)	3:57.95 (1)	1:57.00 (8)	6:55.38 (2)	160.056	+0.753
3rd place, bronze medalist(s)	Martina Sáblíková	(Czech Republic)	39.89 (11)	4:02.31 (4)	1:56.17 (4)	6:53.22 (1)	160.320	+1.017
4	Natalya Voronina	(Russia)	39.91 (12)	3:58.62 (2)	1:58.66 (11)	7:00.67 (4)	161.300	+1.997
5	Joy Beune	(Netherlands)	39.78 (7)	4:03.18 (5)	1:55.89 (3)	7:06.79 (5)	161.619	+2.316
6	Ragne Wiklund	(Norway)	40.00 (13)	4:04.38 (6)	1:56.94 (7)	7:09.04 (6)	162.614	+3.311
7	Elizaveta Golubeva	(Russia)	38.84 (2)	4:06.09 (8)	1:56.64 (5)	7:19.16 (7)	162.651	+3.348
8	Evgeniia Lalenkova	(Russia)	39.86 (8)	4:05.51 (7)	1:55.49 (2)	7:27.34 (8)	164.008	+4.705
9	Nikola Zdráhalová	(Czech Republic)	39.40 (4)	4:10.47 (11)	1:56.87 (6)	—N/a	120.101	—N/a
10	Francesca Lollobrigida	(Italy)	39.64 (6)	4:07.03 (9)	1:58.86 (12)	—N/a	120.431	—N/a
11	Ida Njåtun	(Norway)	39.61 (5)	4:10.67 (12)	1:57.31 (9)	—N/a	120.491	—N/a
12	Karolina Bosiek	(Poland)	38.68 (1)	4:16.51 (16)	1:59.04 (13)	—N/a	121.111	—N/a
13	Natalia Czerwonka	(Poland)	39.86 (8)	4:12.19 (13)	1:57.74 (10)	—N/a	121.137	—N/a
14	Ekaterina Sloeva	(Belarus)	40.31 (14)	4:14.88 (14)	2:00.53 (14)	—N/a	122.966	—N/a
15	Sofie Karoline Haugen	(Norway)	41.32 (17)	4:09.35 (10)	2:00.78 (15)	—N/a	123.138	—N/a
16	Mareike Thum	(Germany)	40.63 (16)	4:15.91 (15)	2:01.10 (16)	—N/a	123.647	—N/a
17	Linda Rossi	(Italy)	40.47 (15)	4:16.86 (18)	2:02.50 (18)	—N/a	124.113	—N/a
18	Leia Behlau	(Germany)	41.34 (18)	4:17.00 (19)	2:01.31 (17)	—N/a	124.609	—N/a
19	Kristiine Kalev	(Estonia)	41.89 (19)	4:27.88 (20)	2:09.74 (19)	—N/a	129.782	—N/a
20	Magdalena Czyszczoń	(Poland)	42.33 (20)	4:16.72 (17)	2:27.28 (20)	—N/a	134.209	—N/a

== Sprint ==
=== Men's championships ===
==== Day 1 ====
===== 500 metres =====
Rank	Skater	Nat.	Time	Behind	Points
1	Viktor Mushtakov	(Russia)	34.69		34.690
2	Joel Dufter	(Germany)	34.79	+0.10	34.790
3	Hein Otterspeer	(Netherlands)	34.85	+0.16	34.850
4	Thomas Krol	(Netherlands)	34.90	+0.21	34.900
5	Artur Nogal	(Poland)	35.02	+0.33	35.020
6	Håvard Holmefjord Lorentzen	(Norway)	35.04	+0.35	35.040
7	Bjørn Magnussen	(Norway)	35.06	+0.37	35.060
8	Piotr Michalski	(Poland)	35.08	+0.39	35.080
8	David Bosa	(Italy)	35.08	+0.39	35.080
10	Marten Liiv	(Estonia)	35.23	+0.54	35.230
11	Nico Ihle	(Germany)	35.27	+0.58	35.270
12	Damian Żurek	(Poland)	35.28	+0.59	35.280
12	Ignat Golovatsiuk	(Belarus)	35.28	+0.59	35.280
14	Artem Arefyev	(Russia)	35.49	+0.80	35.490
15	Victor Lobas	(Russia)	35.65	+0.96	35.650
16	Mathias Vosté	(Belgium)	35.73	+1.04	35.730
17	Hendrik Dombek	(Germany)	35.83	+1.14	35.830
18	Samuli Suomalainen	(Finland)	36.51	+1.82	36.510
	Odin By Farstad	(Norway)	Disqualified		
	Kai Verbij	(Netherlands)	Disqualified		

===== 1000 metres =====
Rank	Skater	Nat.	Time	Behind	Points
1	Thomas Krol	(Netherlands)	1:07.49		33.745
2	Kai Verbij	(Netherlands)	1:08.17	+0.68	34.085
3	Hein Otterspeer	(Netherlands)	1:08.27	+0.78	34.135
4	Joel Dufter	(Germany)	1:08.57	+1.08	34.285
5	Nico Ihle	(Germany)	1:08.93	+1.44	34.465
6	David Bosa	(Italy)	1:09.21	+1.72	34.605
7	Håvard Holmefjord Lorentzen	(Norway)	1:09.24	+1.75	34.620
8	Viktor Mushtakov	(Russia)	1:09.46	+1.97	34.730
9	Mathias Vosté	(Belgium)	1:09.49	+2.00	34.745
10	Odin By Farstad	(Norway)	1:09.58	+2.09	34.790
11	Piotr Michalski	(Poland)	1:09.80	+2.31	34.900
12	Artur Nogal	(Poland)	1:09.85	+2.36	34.925
13	Hendrik Dombek	(Germany)	1:09.96	+2.47	34.980
14	Marten Liiv	(Estonia)	1:09.99	+2.50	34.995
15	Ignat Golovatsiuk	(Belarus)	1:10.25	+2.76	35.125
16	Victor Lobas	(Russia)	1:10.31	+2.82	35.155
17	Artem Arefyev	(Russia)	1:10.59	+3.10	35.295
18	Damian Żurek	(Poland)	1:10.78	+3.29	35.390
18	Bjørn Magnussen	(Norway)	1:10.78	+3.29	35.390
20	Samuli Suomalainen	(Finland)	1:13.18	+5.69	36.590

==== Day 2 ====
===== 500 metres =====
Rank	Skater	Nat.	Time	Behind	Points
1	Kai Verbij	(Netherlands)	34.58		34.580
2	Artur Nogal	(Poland)	34.94	+0.36	34.940
3	Artem Arefyev	(Russia)	34.96	+0.38	34.960
4	Viktor Mushtakov	(Russia)	35.09	+0.51	35.090
5	Hein Otterspeer	(Netherlands)	35.12	+0.54	35.120
6	Joel Dufter	(Germany)	35.23	+0.65	35.230
7	Håvard Holmefjord Lorentzen	(Norway)	35.29	+0.71	35.290
8	Thomas Krol	(Netherlands)	35.30	+0.72	35.300
9	Damian Żurek	(Poland)	35.42	+0.84	35.420
10	Piotr Michalski	(Poland)	35.48	+0.90	35.480
11	Mathias Vosté	(Belgium)	35.50	+0.92	35.500
12	Hendrik Dombek	(Germany)	35.54	+0.96	35.540
13	Ignat Golovatsiuk	(Belarus)	35.58	+1.00	35.580
14	David Bosa	(Italy)	35.68	+1.10	35.680
15	Odin By Farstad	(Norway)	35.80	+1.22	35.800
16	Victor Lobas	(Russia)	35.83	+1.25	35.830
17	Marten Liiv	(Estonia)	35.93	+1.35	35.930
	Nico Ihle	(Germany)	Did not finish		
	Bjørn Magnussen	(Norway)	Disqualified		
	Samuli Suomalainen	(Finland)	Withdrawn		

===== 1000 metres =====
Rank	Skater	Nat.	Time	Behind	Points
1	Thomas Krol	(Netherlands)	1:08.02		34.010
2	Mathias Vosté	(Belgium)	1:08.78	+0.76	34.390
3	Joel Dufter	(Germany)	1:08.93	+0.91	34.465
4	Hein Otterspeer	(Netherlands)	1:09.08	+1.06	34.540
5	Håvard Holmefjord Lorentzen	(Norway)	1:09.22	+1.20	34.610
6	Marten Liiv	(Estonia)	1:09.45	+1.43	34.725
7	David Bosa	(Italy)	1:09.52	+1.50	33.760
8	Piotr Michalski	(Poland)	1:09.59	+1.57	34.795
9	Artur Nogal	(Poland)	1:09.94	+1.92	34.970
10	Hendrik Dombek	(Germany)	1:10.58	+2.56	35.290
11	Damian Żurek	(Poland)	1:10.91	+2.89	35.455
12	Victor Lobas	(Russia)	1:11.17	+3.15	35.585
	Viktor Mushtakov	(Russia)	Did not finish		
	Artem Arefyev	(Russia)	Withdrawn		
	Ignat Golovatsiuk	(Belarus)	Withdrawn		

==== Final ranking ====
Rank	Skater	Nat.	500 m	1000 m	500 m	1000 m	Points	Behind
1st place, gold medalist(s)	Thomas Krol	(Netherlands)	34.90 (4)	1:07.49 (1)	35.30 (8)	1:08.02 (1)	137.955	
2nd place, silver medalist(s)	Hein Otterspeer	(Netherlands)	34.85 (3)	1:08.27 (3)	35.12 (5)	1:09.08 (4)	138.645	+0.690
3rd place, bronze medalist(s)	Joel Dufter	(Germany)	34.79 (2)	1:08.57 (4)	35.23 (6)	1:08.93 (3)	138.770	+0.815
4	Håvard Holmefjord Lorentzen	(Norway)	35.04 (6)	1:09.24 (7)	35.29 (7)	1:09.22 (5)	139.560	+1.605
5	Artur Nogal	(Poland)	35.02 (5)	1:09.85 (12)	34.94 (2)	1:09.94 (9)	139.855	+1.900
6	David Bosa	(Italy)	35.08 (8)	1:09.21 (6)	35.68 (14)	1:09.52 (7)	140.125	+2.170
7	Piotr Michalski	(Poland)	35.08 (8)	1:09.80 (11)	35.48 (10)	1:09.59 (8)	140.255	+2.300
8	Mathias Vosté	(Belgium)	35.73 (16)	1:09.49 (9)	35.50 (11)	1:08.78 (2)	140.365	+2.410
9	Marten Liiv	(Estonia)	35.23 (10)	1:09.99 (14)	35.93 (17)	1:09.45 (6)	140.880	+2.925
10	Damian Żurek	(Poland)	35.28 (12)	1:10.78 (18)	35.42 (9)	1:10.91 (11)	141.545	+3.590
11	Hendrik Dombek	(Germany)	35.83 (17)	1:09.96 (13)	35.54 (12)	1:10.58 (10)	141.640	+3.685
12	Victor Lobas	(Russia)	35.65 (15)	1:10.31 (16)	35.83 (16)	1:11.17 (12)	142.220	+4.265
13	Viktor Mushtakov	(Russia)	34.69 (1)	1:09.46 (8)	35.09 (4)	DNF	104.510	—N/a
	Artem Arefyev	(Russia)	35.49 (14)	1:10.59 (17)	34.96 (3)	WDR	—N/a	—N/a
	Ignat Golovatsiuk	(Belarus)	35.28 (12)	1:10.25 (15)	35.58 (13)	WDR	—N/a	—N/a
	Nico Ihle	(Germany)	35.27 (11)	1:08.93 (5)	DNF	—N/a	—N/a	—N/a
	Bjørn Magnussen	(Norway)	35.06 (7)	1:10.78 (18)	DQ	—N/a	—N/a	—N/a
	Samuli Suomalainen	(Finland)	36.51 (18)	1:13.18 (20)	WDR	—N/a	—N/a	—N/a
	Kai Verbij	(Netherlands)	DQ	1:08.17 (2)	34.58 (1)	—N/a	—N/a	—N/a
	Odin By Farstad	(Norway)	DQ	1:09.58 (10)	35.80 (15)	—N/a	—N/a	—N/a

=== Women's championships ===
==== Day 1 ====
===== 500 metres =====
Rank	Skater	Nat.	Time	Behind	Points
1	Angelina Golikova	(Russia)	37.27		37.270
2	Femke Kok	(Netherlands)	37.52	+0.25	37.520
3	Vanessa Herzog	(Austria)	37.56	+0.29	37.560
4	Jutta Leerdam	(Netherlands)	37.70	+0.43	37.700
5	Olga Fatkulina	(Russia)	37.78	+0.51	37.780
6	Daria Kachanova	(Russia)	37.88	+0.61	37.880
7	Jorien ter Mors	(Netherlands)	38.08	+0.81	38.080
8	Kaja Ziomek	(Poland)	38.16	+0.89	38.160
9	Hanna Nifantava	(Belarus)	38.22	+0.95	38.220
10	Andżelika Wójcik	(Poland)	38.41	+1.14	38.410
11	Katja Franzen	(Germany)	39.10	+1.83	39.100
12	Julie Nistad Samsonsen	(Norway)	39.12	+1.85	39.120
13	Stien Vanhoutte	(Belgium)	39.35	+2.08	39.350
14	Martine Ripsrud	(Norway)	39.60	+2.33	39.600
15	Mihaela Hogaş	(Romania)	39.68	+2.41	39.680
16	Natalia Jabrzyk	(Poland)	40.46	+3.19	40.460

===== 1000 metres =====
Rank	Skater	Nat.	Time	Behind	Points
1	Jorien ter Mors	(Netherlands)	1:14.10		37.050
2	Jutta Leerdam	(Netherlands)	1:14.15	+0.05	37.075
3	Femke Kok	(Netherlands)	1:14.62	+0.52	37.310
4	Angelina Golikova	(Russia)	1:14.67	+0.57	37.335
5	Daria Kachanova	(Russia)	1:15.27	+1.17	37.635
6	Olga Fatkulina	(Russia)	1:15.64	+1.54	37.820
7	Vanessa Herzog	(Austria)	1:16.43	+2.33	38.215
8	Hanna Nifantava	(Belarus)	1:16.76	+2.66	38.380
9	Katja Franzen	(Germany)	1:17.30	+3.20	38.650
10	Kaja Ziomek	(Poland)	1:17.34	+3.24	38.670
11	Andżelika Wójcik	(Poland)	1:18.15	+4.05	39.075
12	Mihaela Hogaş	(Romania)	1:18.49	+4.39	39.245
13	Stien Vanhoutte	(Belgium)	1:19.55	+5.45	39.775
14	Natalia Jabrzyk	(Poland)	1:19.71	+5.61	39.855
15	Julie Nistad Samsonsen	(Norway)	1:20.43	+6.33	40.215
16	Martine Ripsrud	(Norway)	1:20.97	+6.87	40.485

==== Day 2 ====
===== 500 metres =====
Rank	Skater	Nat.	Time	Behind	Points
1	Angelina Golikova	(Russia)	37.42		37.420
2	Femke Kok	(Netherlands)	37.48	+0.06	37.480
3	Jutta Leerdam	(Netherlands)	37.61	+0.19	37.610
4	Vanessa Herzog	(Austria)	37.70	+0.28	37.700
5	Daria Kachanova	(Russia)	37.82	+0.40	37.820
6	Kaja Ziomek	(Poland)	37.94	+0.52	37.940
7	Hanna Nifantava	(Belarus)	38.02	+0.60	38.020
8	Olga Fatkulina	(Russia)	38.04	+0.62	38.040
9	Jorien ter Mors	(Netherlands)	38.07	+0.65	38.070
10	Andżelika Wójcik	(Poland)	38.43	+1.01	38.430
11	Katja Franzen	(Germany)	38.86	+1.44	38.860
12	Julie Nistad Samsonsen	(Norway)	39.04	+1.62	39.040
13	Mihaela Hogaş	(Romania)	39.16	+1.74	39.160
14	Stien Vanhoutte	(Belgium)	39.40	+1.98	39.400
15	Martine Ripsrud	(Norway)	39.53	+2.11	39.530
16	Natalia Jabrzyk	(Poland)	40.19	+2.77	40.190

===== 1000 metres =====
Rank	Skater	Nat.	Time	Behind	Points
1	Jutta Leerdam	(Netherlands)	1:14.00		37.000
2	Jorien ter Mors	(Netherlands)	1:14.46	+0.46	37.230
3	Femke Kok	(Netherlands)	1:15.12	+1.12	37.560
4	Daria Kachanova	(Russia)	1:15.29	+1.29	37.645
5	Angelina Golikova	(Russia)	1:15.66	+1.66	37.830
6	Hanna Nifantava	(Belarus)	1:16.77	+2.77	38.385
7	Kaja Ziomek	(Poland)	1:17.38	+3.38	38.690
8	Vanessa Herzog	(Austria)	1:17.72	+3.72	38.860
9	Andżelika Wójcik	(Poland)	1:18.13	+4.13	39.065
10	Katja Franzen	(Germany)	1:18.36	+4.36	39.180
11	Natalia Jabrzyk	(Poland)	1:19.04	+5.04	39.520
12	Mihaela Hogaş	(Romania)	1:19.15	+5.15	39.575
13	Julie Nistad Samsonsen	(Norway)	1:19.63	+5.63	39.815
14	Martine Ripsrud	(Norway)	1:20.53	+6.53	40.265
15	Stien Vanhoutte	(Belgium)	1:20.80	+6.80	40.400
	Olga Fatkulina	(Russia)	Withdrawn		

==== Final ranking ====
Rank	Skater	Nat.	500 m	1000 m	500 m	1000 m	Points	Behind
1st place, gold medalist(s)	Jutta Leerdam	(Netherlands)	37.70 (4)	1:14.15 (2)	37.61 (3)	1:14.00 (1)	149.385	
2nd place, silver medalist(s)	Angelina Golikova	(Russia)	37.27 (1)	1:14.67 (4)	37.42 (1)	1:15.66 (5)	149.855	+0.470
3rd place, bronze medalist(s)	Femke Kok	(Netherlands)	37.52 (2)	1:14.62 (3)	37.48 (2)	1:15.12 (3)	149.870	+0.485
4	Jorien ter Mors	(Netherlands)	38.08 (7)	1:14.10 (1)	38.07 (9)	1:14.46 (2)	150.430	+1.045
5	Daria Kachanova	(Russia)	37.88 (6)	1:15.27 (5)	37.82 (5)	1:15.29 (4)	150.980	+1.595
6	Vanessa Herzog	(Austria)	37.56 (3)	1:16.43 (7)	37.70 (4)	1:17.72 (8)	152.335	+2.950
7	Hanna Nifantava	(Belarus)	38.22 (9)	1:16.76 (8)	38.02 (7)	1:16.77 (6)	153.005	+3.620
8	Kaja Ziomek	(Poland)	38.16 (8)	1:17.34 (10)	37.94 (6)	1:17.38 (7)	153.460	+4.075
9	Andżelika Wójcik	(Poland)	38.41 (10)	1:18.15 (11)	38.43 (10)	1:18.13 (9)	154.980	+5.595
10	Katja Franzen	(Germany)	39.10 (11)	1:17.30 (9)	38.86 (11)	1:18.36 (10)	155.790	+6.405
11	Mihaela Hogaş	(Romania)	39.68 (15)	1:18.49 (12)	39.16 (13)	1:19.14 (12)	157.655	+8.270
12	Julie Nistad Samsonsen	(Norway)	39.12 (12)	1:20.43 (15)	39.04 (12)	1:19.63 (13)	158.190	+8.805
13	Stien Vanhoutte	(Belgium)	39.35 (13)	1:19.55 (13)	39.40 (14)	1:20.80 (15)	158.925	+9.540
14	Martine Ripsrud	(Norway)	39.60 (14)	1:20.97 (16)	39.53 (15)	1:20.53 (14)	159.880	+10.495
15	Natalia Jabrzyk	(Poland)	40.46 (16)	1:19.71 (14)	40.19 (16)	1:19.04 (11)	160.025	+10.640
16	Olga Fatkulina	(Russia)	37.78 (5)	1:15.64 (6)	38.04 (8)	WDR	113.640	—N/a
