= 2020 World Single Distances Speed Skating Championships – Women's 500 metres =

Women's 500 metres at the 2020 World Single Distances Speed Skating Championships
- Venue: Utah Olympic Oval
- Location: Salt Lake City, United States
- Dates: February 14
- Competitors: 24 from 11 nations
- Winning time: 36.69

Medalists
gold medal	Nao Kodaira	Japan
silver medal	Angelina Golikova	Russia
bronze medal	Olga Fatkulina	Russia

The Women's 500 metres competition at the 2020 World Single Distances Speed Skating Championships was held on February 14, 2020.

== Results ==
The race was started at 17:26.

Rank	Pair	Lane	Name	Country	Time	Diff
1st place, gold medalist(s)	10	o	Nao Kodaira	Japan	36.69	
2nd place, silver medalist(s)	12	i	Angelina Golikova	Russia	36.74	+0.05
3rd place, bronze medalist(s)	12	o	Olga Fatkulina	Russia	36.78	+0.09
4	11	i	Vanessa Herzog	Austria	36.94	+0.25
5	7	i	Kimi Goetz	United States	37.18	+0.49
6	4	o	Letitia de Jong	Netherlands	37.19	+0.50
7	4	i	Erin Jackson	United States	37.28	+0.59
8	5	o	Jutta Leerdam	Netherlands	37.30	+0.61
9	2	o	Femke Kok	Netherlands	37.45 JWR	+0.76
10	11	o	Daria Kachanova	Russia	37.47	+0.78
11	2	i	Kim Hyun-yung	South Korea	37.53	+0.84
12	9	o	Arisa Go	Japan	37.57	+0.88
13	10	i	Brittany Bowe	United States	37.65	+0.96
14	5	i	Heather McLean	Canada	37.69(6)	+1.00
15	8	i	Maki Tsuji	Japan	37.69(7)	+1.00
16	6	o	Kaja Ziomek	Poland	37.79	+1.10
17	1	i	Tian Ruining	China	37.85	+1.16
18	8	o	Kim Min-sun	South Korea	37.89	+1.20
19	6	i	Jin Jingzhu	China	37.93	+1.24
20	9	i	Marsha Hudey	Canada	38.03	+1.34
21	3	o	Andżelika Wójcik	Poland	38.42	+1.73
22	3	i	Hanna Nifantava	Belarus	38.65	+1.96
23	1	o	Nikola Zdráhalová	Czech Republic	38.75	+2.06
	7	o	Kaylin Irvine	Canada	Did not finish	
