= List of Belarusian records in speed skating =

The following are the national records in speed skating in Belarus maintained by the Skating Union of Belarus.

== Men ==
Event	Record	Athlete	Date	Meet	Place	Ref
500 meters	34.12	Ignat Golovatsiuk	12 December 2021	World Cup	Calgary, Canada	
500 meters × 2	72.55	Evgeny Kazimirenko	November 2013	Russian Cup	Kolomna, Russia	
1000 meters	1:07.32	Ignat Golovatsiuk	15 February 2020	World Single Distances Championships	Salt Lake City, United States	
1500 meters	1:44.87	Victor Rudenko	15 November 2025	World Cup	Salt Lake City, United States	
3000 meters	3:44.55	Yahor Damaratski	4 October 2025	International Race	Inzell, Germany	
5000 meters	6:16.92	Vitaly Mikhailov	8 February 2020	World Cup	Calgary, Canada	
10000 meters	13:19.59	Vitaly Mikhailov	21 November 2015	World Cup	Salt Lake City, United States	
Team sprint (3 laps)	1:21.47	Artiom Chaban; Ignat Golovatsiuk; Yauheni Hahiyeu	10 January 2020	European Championships	Heerenveen, Netherlands	
Team pursuit (8 laps)	3:47.50	Evgeniy Bolgov; Yahor Damaratski; Victor Rudenko	12 December 2021	World Cup	Calgary, Canada	
Sprint combination	140.365 pts	Ignat Golovatsiuk	23–24 February 2019	World Sprint Championships	Heerenveen, Netherlands	
Small combination	157.990 pts	Oleg Psevkin	November 1999	Can-Am International	Calgary, Canada	
Big combination	155.383 pts	Vitaly Mikhailov	23–24 December 2017	Belarusian Allround Championships	Minsk, Belarus	

== Women ==
Event	Record	Athlete	Date	Meet	Place	Ref
500 meters	37.56	Hanna Nifantava	4 December 2021	World Cup	Salt Lake City, United States	
500 meters × 2	75.39	Anzhelika Kotyuga	13–14 February 2002	Olympic Games	Salt Lake City, United States	
1000 meters	1:14.44	Anzhelika Kotyuga	23 January 2005	World Sprint Championships	Salt Lake City, United States	
1500 meters	1:54.83	Maryna Zuyeva	3 March 2019	World Allround Championships	Calgary, Canada	
3000 meters	3:55.73	Maryna Zuyeva	9 March 2019	World Cup	Salt Lake City, United States	
5000 meters	6:48.22	Maryna Zuyeva	15 February 2020	World Single Distances Championships	Salt Lake City, United States	
10000 meters						
Team sprint (3 laps)	1:28.43	Katsiaryna Hahiyeva; Hanna Damaratskaya; Sofiya Taturevich	31 October 2024	Russia Cup	Kolomna, Russia	
Team pursuit (6 laps)	2:58.60	Maryna Zuyeva; Hanna Nifantava; Ekaterina Sloeva	4 December 2021	World Cup	Salt Lake City, United States	
Sprint combination	150.415 pts	Anzhelika Kotyuga	22–23 January 2005	World Sprint Championships	Salt Lake City, United States	
Mini combination	165.314 pts	Anzhelika Kotyuga	November 1999	Can-Am International	Calgary, Canada	
Small combination	159.591 pts	Maryna Zuyeva	2–3 March 2019	World Allround Championships	Calgary, Canada	

== Mixed ==
Event	Record	Athlete	Date	Meet	Place	Ref
Relay	3:01.99	Victor Rudenko; Katsiaryna Hahiyeva	22 November 2026	World Cup	Obihiro, Japan	
