= Speed skating at the 2026 Winter Olympics – Women's 1000 metres =

Women's 1000 metres at the XXV Olympic Winter Games
- Speed skating
- Venue: Milano Speed Skating Stadium, Milan
- Date: 9 February 2026
- Competitors: 30 from 15 nations
- Winning time: 1:12.31

Medalists
1st place, gold medalist(s)		Jutta Leerdam	Netherlands
2nd place, silver medalist(s)		Femke Kok	Netherlands
3rd place, bronze medalist(s)		Miho Takagi	Japan

The women's 1000 m competition in speed skating at the 2026 Winter Olympics was held on 9 February at the Milano Speed Skating Stadium in Milan. Jutta Leerdam of the Netherlands won the event, improving on her silver in 2022. Her teammate Femke Kok won the silver medal, which was her first Olympic medal. Miho Takagi, the defending champion, won bronze.

== Background ==
All the 2022 medalists, the champion Miho Takagi, the silver medalist Jutta Leerdam, and the bronze medalist Brittany Bowe, qualified for the Olympics. Before the Olympics, Femke Kok was leading the 1000m standings of the 2025–26 ISU Speed Skating World Cup. Takagi was the 1000m 2025 world champion.

== Summary ==
Skating in pair 1, Suzanne Schulting remained the leader until pair 11, when Erin Jackson improved her time. In pair 13, Kok skated faster than the Olympic record, and Bowe finished in provisional silver medal position. In pair 15, the last one, Leerdam beat Kok's time, thus setting the new Olympic record. Takagi in the same pair finished third, moving Bowe off the podium.

== Records ==
Prior to this competition, the existing world, Olympic and track records were as follows.

World record	(United States) Brittany Bowe	1:11.61	Salt Lake City, United States	9 March 2019
Olympic record	(Japan) Miho Takagi	1:13.19	Beijing, China	17 February 2022
Track record	(Netherlands) Meike Veen	1:16.61		29 November 2025

A new Olympic record was set twice during the competition; the previous record was set four years earlier and was broken by 0.88 seconds; the top two finishers were under the previous record.

Date	Round	Athlete	Country	Time	Record
9 February	Pair 13	Femke Kok	Netherlands	1:12.59	OR
9 February	Pair 15	Jutta Leerdam	Netherlands	1:12.31	OR, TR

== Results ==
Rank	Pair	Lane	Name	Country	Time	Time behind	Notes
1st place, gold medalist(s)	15	O	Jutta Leerdam	Netherlands	1:12.31		OR
2nd place, silver medalist(s)	13	O	Femke Kok	Netherlands	1:12.59	+0.28	
3rd place, bronze medalist(s)	15	I	Miho Takagi	Japan	1:13.95	+1.64	
4	13	I	Brittany Bowe	United States	1:14.55	+2.24	
5	14	O	Béatrice Lamarche	Canada	1:14.73	+2.42	
6	11	I	Erin Jackson	United States	1:15.00	+2.69	
7	14	I	Rio Yamada	Japan	1:15.16	+2.85	
8	1	O	Suzanne Schulting	Netherlands	1:15.47	+3.15	
9	12	O	Lee Na-hyun	South Korea	1:15.76	+3.45	
10	8	O	Nikola Zdráhalová	Czech Republic	1:15.830	+3.52	
11	12	I	Ellia Smeding	Great Britain	1:15.834	+3.52	
12	10	O	Yin Qi	China	1:15.87	+3.56	
13	9	I	Han Mei	China	1:15.97	+3.66	
14	9	O	Nadezhda Morozova	Kazakhstan	1:16.00	+3.69	
15	6	I	Natalia Czerwonka	Poland	1:16.09	+3.78	
16	8	I	Yukino Yoshida	Japan	1:16.11	+3.80	
17	4	I	Kaitlyn McGregor	Switzerland	1:16.17	+3.85	
18	11	O	Kim Min-sun	South Korea	1:16.24	+3.93	
19	7	I	Elizaveta Golubeva	Kazakhstan	1:16.40	+4.09	
20	7	O	Isabelle van Elst	Belgium	1:16.68	+4.37	
21	6	O	Anna Ostlender	Germany	1:16.83	+4.52	
22	10	I	Karolina Bosiek	Poland	1:16.88	+4.57	
23	2	I	Fran Vanhoutte	Belgium	1:16.93	+4.62	
24	5	I	Vanessa Herzog	Austria	1:16.99	+4.68	
25	1	I	Maybritt Vigl	Italy	1:17.151	+4.84	
26	2	O	Carolina Hiller-Donnelly	Canada	1:17.156	+4.84	
27	3	O	Rose Laliberté-Roy	Canada	1:17.50	+5.19	
28	4	O	Kristina Silaeva	Kazakhstan	1:17.57	+5.26	
29	5	O	Tian Ruining	China	1:17.87	+5.56	
30	3	I	Jeannine Rosner	Austria	1:18.41	+6.10	
