= 2021 World Single Distances Speed Skating Championships – Women's 500 metres =

Women's 500 metres at the 2021 World Single Distances Speed Skating Championships
- Venue: Thialf
- Location: Heerenveen, Netherlands
- Date: 12 February
- Competitors: 21 from 11 nations
- Winning time: 37.141

Medalists
| gold medal | Angelina Golikova |
| silver medal | Femke Kok | Netherlands |
| bronze medal | Olga Fatkulina |

The Women's 500 metres competition at the 2021 World Single Distances Speed Skating Championships was held on 12 February 2021.

== Results ==
The race was started at 17:00.

| Rank | Pair | Lane | Name | Country | Time | Diff |
|---|---|---|---|---|---|---|
| 1st place, gold medalist(s) | 9 | o | Angelina Golikova | Russian Skating Union | 37.141 | |
| 2nd place, silver medalist(s) | 11 | i | Femke Kok | Netherlands | 37.281 | +0.14 |
| 3rd place, bronze medalist(s) | 10 | o | Olga Fatkulina | Russian Skating Union | 37.455 | +0.31 |
| 4 | 11 | o | Jutta Leerdam | Netherlands | 37.615 | +0.47 |
| 5 | 10 | i | Vanessa Herzog | Austria | 37.855 | +0.71 |
| 6 | 6 | i | Daria Kachanova | Russian Skating Union | 37.892 | +0.75 |
| 7 | 9 | i | Heather McLean | Canada | 37.972 | +0.83 |
| 8 | 7 | o | Brittany Bowe | United States | 37.982 | +0.84 |
| 9 | 8 | o | Andżelika Wójcik | Poland | 38.048 | +0.90 |
| 10 | 8 | i | Kaja Ziomek | Poland | 38.170 | +1.03 |
| 11 | 4 | o | Yekaterina Aydova | Kazakhstan | 38.216 | +1.07 |
| 12 | 6 | o | Kaylin Irvine | Canada | 38.226 | +1.08 |
| 13 | 7 | i | Hanna Nifantava | Belarus | 38.453 | +1.31 |
| 14 | 1 | i | Suzanne Schulting | Netherlands | 38.758 | +1.61 |
| 15 | 5 | o | Julie Nistad Samsonsen | Norway | 38.942 | +1.80 |
| 16 | 4 | i | Katja Franzen | Germany | 39.092 | +1.95 |
| 17 | 2 | o | Béatrice Lamarche | Canada | 39.102 | +1.96 |
| 18 | 5 | i | Stien Vanhoutte | Belgium | 39.242 | +2.10 |
| 19 | 3 | o | Sandrine Tas | Belgium | 39.570 | +2.43 |
| 20 | 2 | i | Anna Ostlender | Germany | 39.604 | +2.46 |
| 21 | 3 | i | Martine Ripsrud | Norway | 39.621 | +2.48 |
