= 2022 European Speed Skating Championships – Women's 500 metres =

Women's 500 metres at the 2022 European Speed Skating Championships
- Venue: Thialf
- Location: Heerenveen, Netherlands
- Dates: 8 January
- Competitors: 18 from 10 nations
- Winning time: 37.32

Medalists
gold medal	Femke Kok	Netherlands
silver medal	Angelina Golikova	Russia
bronze medal	Daria Kachanova	Russia

The women's 500 metres competition at the 2022 European Speed Skating Championships was held on 8 January 2022.

== Results ==
The race was started at 14:50.

Rank	Pair	Lane	Name	Country	Time	Diff
1st place, gold medalist(s)	6	o	Femke Kok	Netherlands	37.32	
2nd place, silver medalist(s)	7	o	Angelina Golikova	Russia	37.43	+0.11
3rd place, bronze medalist(s)	9	i	Daria Kachanova	Russia	37.58	+0.26
4	9	o	Andżelika Wójcik	Poland	37.69	+0.37
5	5	o	Michelle de Jong	Netherlands	37.85	+0.54
6	4	o	Dione Voskamp	Netherlands	37.87	+0.55
7	8	o	Hanna Nifantava	Belarus	38.26	+0.94
8	8	i	Kaja Ziomek	Poland	38.32	+1.00
9	4	i	Karolina Bosiek	Poland	38.48	+1.16
10	6	i	Martine Ripsrud	Norway	38.85	+1.53
11	1	o	Ellia Smeding	Great Britain	39.17	+1.84
12	1	i	Katja Franzen	Germany	39.206	+1.88
12	7	i	Julie Nistad Samsonsen	Norway	39.206	+1.88
14	3	i	Mihaela Hogaş	Romania	39.296	+1.97
15	2	i	Sandrine Tas	Belgium	39.297	+1.97
16	5	i	Sophie Warmuth	Germany	39.30	+1.98
17	3	o	Lea Sophie Scholz	Germany	39.37	+2.04
18	2	o	Vera Güntert	Switzerland	40.75	+3.43
