= 2020 European Speed Skating Championships – Women's team sprint =

Women's team sprint at the 2020 European Speed Skating Championships
- Venue: Thialf
- Location: Heerenveen, Netherlands
- Dates: 10 January
- Competitors: 12 from 4 nations
- Teams: 4
- Winning time: 1:26.17

Medalists
gold medal	Angelina Golikova; Olga Fatkulina; Daria Kachanova	Russia
silver medal	Femke Kok; Letitia de Jong; Ireen Wüst	Netherlands
bronze medal	Andżelika Wójcik; Kaja Ziomek; Natalia Czerwonka	Poland

The women's team sprint competition at the 2020 European Speed Skating Championships was held on 10 January 2020.

== Results ==
The race was started at 21:25.

Rank	Pair	Lane	Country	Time	Diff
1st place, gold medalist(s)	2	c	Russia; Angelina Golikova; Olga Fatkulina; Daria Kachanova	1:26.17	
2nd place, silver medalist(s)	2	s	Netherlands; Femke Kok; Letitia de Jong; Ireen Wüst	1:26.62	+0.45
3rd place, bronze medalist(s)	1	c	Poland; Andżelika Wójcik; Kaja Ziomek; Natalia Czerwonka	1:28.25	+2.08
4	1	s	Belarus; Yeugeniya Vorobyova; Hanna Nifantava; Maryna Zuyeva	1:30.68	+4.51
