= Speed skating at the 2026 Winter Olympics – Women's 500 metres =

Women's 500 metres at the XXV Olympic Winter Games
- Speed skating
- Venue: Milano Speed Skating Stadium, Milan
- Date: 15 February 2026
- Competitors: 29 from 15 nations
- Winning time: 36.49

Medalists
| 1st place, gold medalist(s) | | Femke Kok | Netherlands |
| 2nd place, silver medalist(s) | | Jutta Leerdam | Netherlands |
| 3rd place, bronze medalist(s) | | Miho Takagi | Japan |

The women's 500 m competition in speed skating at the 2026 Winter Olympics was held on 15 February, at the Milano Speed Skating Stadium in Milan. Femke Kok of the Netherlands won the event, setting a new Olympic record. This was her second Olympic medal and first gold. Her teammate Jutta Leerdam won the silver medal, and Miho Takagi of Japan won bronze.

== Background ==
The 2022 champion, Erin Jackson, and the silver medalist, Miho Takagi, qualified for the event. The bronze medalist, Angelina Golikova, was barred from international competitions after the start of the Russian invasion of Ukraine. Before the Olympics, Femke Kok was leading the 500m standings of the 2025–26 ISU Speed Skating World Cup. She was also the 500m 2025 world champion.

== Summary ==
Takagi in pair 4 became the early leader with 37.27. This time was only improved by Leerdam in pair 12. At that point, Serena Pergher was standing in the bronze medal position. This provisional podium was kept until pair 15, the last one, in which Kok skated with a new Olympic record, moving Pergher off the podium. The defending champion, Jackson, also skating in pair 15, was fifth.

== Records ==
Prior to this competition, the existing world, Olympic and track records were as follows.

| World record | Femke Kok (NED) | 36.09 | Salt Lake City, United States | 16 November 2025 |
| Olympic record | Nao Kodaira (JPN) | 36.94 | Gangneung, South Korea | 18 February 2018 |
| Track record | Serena Pergher (ITA) | 38.16 | | 30 November 2025 |

A new Olympic record was set during the competition; the previous record was set eight years earlier and was broken by 0.45 seconds; no others were under the previous record.

| Date | Round | Athlete | Country | Time | Record |
|---|---|---|---|---|---|
| 15 February | Pair 15 | Femke Kok | Netherlands | 36.49 | OR, TR |

== Results ==
| Rank | Pair | Lane | Name | Country | Time | Time behind | Notes |
|---|---|---|---|---|---|---|---|
| 1st place, gold medalist(s) | 15 | O | Femke Kok | Netherlands | 36.49 | | OR |
| 2nd place, silver medalist(s) | 12 | I | Jutta Leerdam | Netherlands | 37.15 | +0.66 | |
| 3rd place, bronze medalist(s) | 4 | O | Miho Takagi | Japan | 37.27 | +0.78 | |
| 4 | 10 | O | Serena Pergher | Italy | 37.30 | +0.81 | |
| 5 | 15 | I | Erin Jackson | United States | 37.32 | +0.83 | |
| 6 | 13 | O | Kaja Ziomek-Nogal | Poland | 37.39 | +0.90 | |
| 7 | 9 | O | Béatrice Lamarche | Canada | 37.53 | +1.04 | |
| 8 | 12 | O | Sophie Warmuth | Germany | 37.75 | +1.26 | |
| 9 | 7 | O | Rio Yamada | Japan | 37.78 | +1.29 | |
| 10 | 13 | I | Lee Na-hyun | South Korea | 37.86 | +1.37 | |
| 11 | 8 | O | Andżelika Wójcik | Poland | 37.914 | +1.42 | |
| 11 | 11 | O | Chen Ying-chu | Chinese Taipei | 37.914 | +1.42 | |
| 13 | 14 | O | Yukino Yoshida | Japan | 37.98 | +1.49 | |
| 14 | 10 | I | Kim Min-sun | South Korea | 38.010 | +1.52 | |
| 15 | 14 | I | Anna Boersma | Netherlands | 38.013 | +1.52 | |
| 16 | 8 | I | Tian Ruining | China | 38.14 | +1.65 | |
| 17 | 11 | I | Martyna Baran | Poland | 38.15 | +1.66 | |
| 18 | 9 | I | Kristina Silaeva | Kazakhstan | 38.33 | +1.84 | |
| 19 | 5 | I | Brooklyn McDougall | Canada | 38.36 | +1.87 | |
| 20 | 6 | I | Julie Nistad Samsonsen | Norway | 38.37 | +1.88 | |
| 21 | 7 | I | Carolina Hiller | Canada | 38.38 | +1.89 | |
| 22 | 4 | I | Wang Jingziqian | China | 38.57 | +2.08 | |
| 23 | 5 | O | Fran Vanhoutte | Belgium | 38.63 | +2.14 | |
| 24 | 3 | I | Maybritt Vigl | Italy | 38.66 | +2.17 | |
| 25 | 1 | I | Ellia Smeding | Great Britain | 38.93 | +2.44 | |
| 26 | 2 | I | Nikola Zdráhalová | Czech Republic | 39.00 | +2.51 | |
| 27 | 6 | O | Anna Ostlender | Germany | 39.02 | +2.53 | |
| 28 | 2 | O | Sarah Warren | United States | 39.19 | +2.70 | |
| 29 | 3 | O | Arina Ilyachshenko | Kazakhstan | 39.38 | +2.89 | |
