= 2018 European Speed Skating Championships – Women's 500 metres =

Women's 500 metres at the 2018 European Speed Skating Championships
- Venue: Kolomna Speed Skating Center
- Location: Kolomna, Russia
- Dates: 5 January
- Competitors: 20 from 10 nations
- Winning time: 37.69

Medalists
gold medal	Vanessa Herzog	Austria
silver medal	Angelina Golikova	Russia
bronze medal	Karolína Erbanová	Czech Republic

The women's 500 metres competition at the 2018 European Speed Skating Championships was held on 5 January 2018.

== Results ==
The race was started at 16:00.

Rank	Pair	Lane	Name	Country	Time	Diff
1st place, gold medalist(s)	8	o	Vanessa Herzog	Austria	37.69	
2nd place, silver medalist(s)	8	i	Angelina Golikova	Russia	38.04	+0.35
3rd place, bronze medalist(s)	10	i	Karolína Erbanová	Czech Republic	38.18	+0.49
4	9	o	Olga Fatkulina	Russia	38.30	+0.61
5	7	i	Daria Kachanova	Russia	38.56	+0.87
6	9	i	Letitia de Jong	Netherlands	38.70	+1.01
7	5	o	Sanneke de Neeling	Netherlands	38.91	+1.22
8	5	i	Gabriele Hirschbichler	Germany	38.97	+1.28
9	4	o	Mayon Kuipers	Netherlands	39.17	+1.48
10	10	o	Yvonne Daldossi	Italy	39.25	+1.56
11	6	o	Elina Risku	Finland	39.58	+1.89
12	2	i	Nikola Zdráhalová	Czech Republic	39.65	+1.96
13	7	o	Kseniya Sadovskaya	Belarus	39.65	+1.96
14	6	i	Francesca Bettrone	Italy	39.72	+2.03
15	2	o	Martine Ripsrud	Norway	39.82	+2.13
16	3	i	Kaja Ziomek	Poland	40.16	+2.47
17	1	i	Andżelika Wójcik	Poland	40.64	+2.95
18	1	o	Roxanne Dufter	Germany	40.73	+3.04
19	3	o	Yauheniya Varabyova	Belarus	40.89	+3.20
20	4	i	Rikke Jeppsson	Norway	41.90	+4.21
