= 2018 European Speed Skating Championships – Women's 1000 metres =

Women's 1000 metres at the 2018 European Speed Skating Championships
- Venue: Kolomna Speed Skating Center
- Location: Kolomna, Russia
- Dates: 6 January
- Competitors: 21 from 10 nations
- Winning time: 1:15.34

Medalists
gold medal	Yekaterina Shikhova	Russia
silver medal	Vanessa Herzog	Austria
bronze medal	Marrit Leenstra	Netherlands

The women's 1000 metres competition at the 2018 European Speed Skating Championships was held on 6 January 2018.

== Results ==
The race was started at 14:45.

Rank	Pair	Lane	Name	Country	Time	Diff
1st place, gold medalist(s)	10	o	Yekaterina Shikhova	Russia	1:15.34	
2nd place, silver medalist(s)	10	i	Vanessa Herzog	Austria	1:15.44	+0.10
3rd place, bronze medalist(s)	9	i	Marrit Leenstra	Netherlands	1:15.740	+0.40
4	7	i	Lotte van Beek	Netherlands	1:15.748	+0.40
5	11	o	Letitia de Jong	Netherlands	1:16.34	+1.00
6	11	i	Olga Fatkulina	Russia	1:16.64	+1.30
7	8	i	Daria Kachanova	Russia	1:16.85	+1.51
8	9	o	Natalia Czerwonka	Poland	1:17.66	+2.32
9	6	i	Gabriele Hirschbichler	Germany	1:17.98	+2.64
10	6	o	Yvonne Daldossi	Italy	1:18.76	+3.42
11	5	o	Anne Gulbrandsen	Norway	1:19.40	+4.06
12	8	o	Michelle Uhrig	Germany	1:19.75	+4.41
13	3	o	Tatsiana Mikhailava	Belarus	1:19.97	+4.63
14	2	i	Andżelika Wójcik	Poland	1:20.03	+4.69
15	4	o	Katarzyna Woźniak	Poland	1:20.21	+4.87
16	3	i	Elina Risku	Finland	1:21.13	+5.79
17	1	i	Natálie Kerschbaummayr	Czech Republic	1:21.28	+5.94
18	5	i	Martine Ripsrud	Norway	1:21.63	+6.29
19	1	o	Rikke Jeppsson	Norway	1:22.24	+6.90
20	4	i	Eliška Dřímalová	Czech Republic	1:23.06	+7.72
	7	o	Francesca Bettrone	Italy	Did not finish	
