= Netherlands at the 2026 Winter Olympics =

- Flag of the Netherlands
- IOC code: NED
- NOC: Dutch Olympic Committee*; Dutch Sports Federation
- Website: www.nocnsf.nl/en

in Milan and Cortina d'Ampezzo, Italy 6 February 2026 – 22 February 2026
- Competitors: 38 (20 men and 18 women) in 6 sports
- Flag bearers (opening): Jens van 't Wout & Kimberley Bos
- Flag bearers (closing): Jorrit Bergsma & Xandra Velzeboer
- Officials: Carl Verheijen, Head of mission
- Medals Ranked 3rd: Gold 10 Silver 7 Bronze 3 Total 20

Winter Olympics appearances (overview)
- 1928; 1932; 1936; 1948; 1952; 1956; 1960; 1964; 1968; 1972; 1976; 1980; 1984; 1988; 1992; 1994; 1998; 2002; 2006; 2010; 2014; 2018; 2022; 2026

The Netherlands competed at the 2026 Winter Olympics in Milan and Cortina d'Ampezzo, Italy, from 6 to 22 February 2026.

Jorrit Bergsma's gold medal on the penultimate day of the games ensured that these are the Netherlands' most successful Winter Olympics ever. They have won ten gold medals, surpassing their previous best total of eight achieved in 2014, 2018 and 2022. Meanwhile, Jorrit Bergsma and Xandra Velzeboer were the country's flagbearer during the closing ceremony.

== Competitors ==
The following is the list of number of competitors participating at the Games per sport/discipline.

Sport	Men	Women	Total
Bobsleigh	4	0	4
Figure skating	1	1	2
Short-track speed skating	5	5	10
Skeleton	0	1	1
Snowboarding	1	3	4
Speed skating	9	9	18
Total	21	18*	39*

*Suzanne Schulting is selected for both speed skating and short-track speed skating, so the total is one lower than the sum.

== Medalists ==
The following Dutch competitors won medals at the games. In the discipline sections below, the medalists' names are bolded.

Medal	Name	Sport	Event	Date
Gold	Jutta Leerdam	Speed skating	Women's 1000 metres	9 February
Gold	Xandra Velzeboer	Short-track speed skating	Women's 500 metres	12 February
Gold	Jens van 't Wout	Short-track speed skating	Men's 1000 metres	12 February
Gold	Jens van 't Wout	Short-track speed skating	Men's 1500 metres	14 February
Gold	Femke Kok	Speed skating	Women's 500 metres	15 February
Gold	Xandra Velzeboer	Short-track speed skating	Women's 1000 metres	16 February
Gold	Antoinette Rijpma-de Jong	Speed skating	Women's 1500 metres	20 February
Gold	Teun Boer; Itzhak de Laat; Friso Emons; Jens van 't Wout; Melle van 't Wout	Short-track speed skating	5000 m relay	20 February
Gold	Jorrit Bergsma	Speed skating	Men's mass start	21 February
Gold	Marijke Groenewoud	Speed skating	Women's mass start	21 February
Silver	Femke Kok	Speed skating	Women's 1000 metres	9 February
Silver	Jenning de Boo	Speed skating	Men's 1000 metres	11 February
Silver	Merel Conijn	Speed skating	Women's 5000 metres	12 February
Silver	Jenning de Boo	Speed skating	Men's 500 metres	14 February
Silver	Jutta Leerdam	Speed skating	Women's 500 metres	15 February
Silver	Marijke Groenewoud; Antoinette Rijpma-de Jong; Joy Beune	Speed skating	Women's team pursuit	17 February
Silver	Melle van 't Wout	Short-track speed skating	Men's 500 metres	18 February
Bronze	Jorrit Bergsma	Speed skating	Men's 10,000 metres	13 February
Bronze	Jens van 't Wout	Short-track speed skating	Men's 500 metres	18 February
Bronze	Kjeld Nuis	Speed skating	Men's 1500 metres	19 February

Medals by date
**Day**	**Date**	1st place, gold medalist(s)	2nd place, silver medalist(s)	3rd place, bronze medalist(s)	Total
3	9 February	1	1	0	2
5	11 February	0	1	0	1
6	12 February	2	1	0	3
7	13 February	0	0	1	1
8	14 February	1	1	0	2
9	15 February	1	1	0	2
10	16 February	1	0	0	1
11	17 February	0	1	0	1
12	18 February	0	1	1	2
13	19 February	0	0	1	1
14	20 February	2	0	0	2
15	21 February	2	0	0	2
Total		10	7	3	20

Medals by sport
Sport	1st place, gold medalist(s)	2nd place, silver medalist(s)	3rd place, bronze medalist(s)	Total
Speed skating	5	6	2	**13**
Short-track speed skating	5	1	1	**7**
Total	10	7	3	20

Medals by gender
Gender	1st place, gold medalist(s)	2nd place, silver medalist(s)	3rd place, bronze medalist(s)	Total
Female	6	4	0	**10**
Male	4	3	3	**10**
Mixed	0	0	0	**0**
Total	10	7	3	20

Multiple medalists
Name	Sport	1st place, gold medalist(s)	2nd place, silver medalist(s)	3rd place, bronze medalist(s)	Total
Jens van 't Wout	Short-track speed skating	3	0	1	**4**
Xandra Velzeboer	Short-track speed skating	2	0	0	**2**
Melle van 't Wout	Short-track speed skating	1	1	0	**2**
Antoinette Rijpma-de Jong	Speed skating	1	1	0	**2**
Femke Kok	Speed skating	1	1	0	**2**
Jutta Leerdam	Speed skating	1	1	0	**2**
Marijke Groenewoud	Speed skating	1	1	0	**2**
Jorrit Bergsma	Speed skating	1	0	1	**2**
Jenning de Boo	Speed skating	0	2	0	**2**

== Bobsleigh ==
The Netherlands qualified two sleds (two-man and four-man).

Athlete	Event	Run 1		Run 2		Run 3		Run 4		Total	
Athlete	Event	Time	Rank	Time	Rank	Time	Rank	Time	Rank	Time	Rank
Dave Wesselink; Jelen Franjic	Two-man	55.83	12	56.18	17	55.44	5	55.87	12	3:43.32	10 (=)
Dave Wesselink; Janko Franjic; Jelen Franjić; Timme Koster; Stephan Huis in 't Veld (reserve)	Four-man	55.09	20	55.00	10	55.15	16	55.04	11	3:40.28	13

== Figure skating ==
In the 2025 World Figure Skating Championships in Boston, the United States, the Netherlands secured one quota in each of the pair skating.

Athlete	Event	SP/SD		FP/FD		Total	
Athlete	Event	Points	Rank	Points	Rank	Points	Rank
Daria Danilova; Michel Tsiba	Pairs	64.07	17	Did not advance			

== Short-track speed skating ==
The Netherlands qualified the maximum team size of ten short-track speed skaters (five per gender) after the conclusion of the 2025–26 ISU Short Track World Tour. Nine athletes were confirmed after the Dutch championships, the tenth one, Itzhak de Laat was announced on 20 January 2026 as it became clear that Daan Kos hasn't properly recovered from injury. Coached by Niels Kerstholt, the following athletes will represent the Netherlands:

Men

Athlete	Event	Heat		Quarterfinal		Semifinal		Final	
Athlete	Event	Time	Rank	Time	Rank	Time	Rank	Time	Rank
Teun Boer	500 m	52.425	2 Q	40.412	2 Q	40.295	2 Q	1:05.360	4
Jens van 't Wout	500 m	40.567	1 Q	40.408	1 Q	40.064	1 Q	41.908	3rd place, bronze medalist(s)
Melle van 't Wout	500 m	40.809	1 Q	40.554	1 Q	40.916	2 Q	40.912	2nd place, silver medalist(s)
Teun Boer	1000 m	1:24.395	3 q	1:26.638	3 ADV	1:24.209	4 FB	1:27.267	7
Jens van 't Wout	1000 m	1:25.237	1 Q	1:25.199	1 Q	1:24.664	2 FA	1:24.537	1st place, gold medalist(s)
Itzhak de Laat	1500 m	—N/a		2:12.974	5	Did not advance			
Friso Emons	1500 m	—N/a		2:16,07	PEN	Did not advance			
Jens van 't Wout	1500 m	—N/a		2:20.657	1 Q	2:14.988	1 FA	2:12.21	1st place, gold medalist(s)
Teun Boer; Itzhak de Laat*; Friso Emons; Jens van 't Wout; Melle van 't Wout*	5000 m relay	—N/a				6:52.751	2 FA	6:51.847	1st place, gold medalist(s)

Qualification legend: Q - Qualify based on position in heat; q - Qualify based on time in field; FA - Qualify to medal final; ADV A - Advanced to medal final on referee decision; FB - Qualify to consolation final
* Itzhak de Laat skated the semifinal and Melle van 't Wout the A-Final.

Women

Athlete	Event	Heat		Quarterfinal		Semifinal		Final	
Athlete	Event	Time	Rank	Time	Rank	Time	Rank	Time	Rank
Selma Poutsma	500 m	42.629	1 Q	42.234	3 q	41.760	3 FA	42.491	4
Michelle Velzeboer	500 m	42.598	1 Q	42.417	2 Q	1:27.632	5 FB	1:05.774	8
Xandra Velzeboer	500 m	42.417	1 Q	41.583 OR	1 Q	41.399 WR	1 FA	41.609	1st place, gold medalist(s)
Selma Poutsma	1000 m	1:53.774	4	Did not advance					
Michelle Velzeboer	1000 m	1:29.730	2 Q	1:28.686	3	Did not advance			
Xandra Velzeboer	1000 m	1:27.816	1 Q	1:28.986	1 Q	1:29.514	1 FA	1:28.437	1st place, gold medalist(s)
Suzanne Schulting	1500 m	—N/a		2:27.705	3 Q	3:08.987	7	Did not advance	
Michelle Velzeboer	1500 m	—N/a		DNF		Did not advance			
Xandra Velzeboer	1500 m	—N/a		2:27.552	1 Q	2:41.237	3 FB	2:35.554	8
Zoë Deltrap; Selma Poutsma; Michelle Velzeboer; Xandra Velzeboer; Suzanne Schulting (reserve)	3000 m relay	—N/a				4:06.29	1 FA	4:09.081	4

Qualification legend: Q - Qualify based on position in heat; q - Qualify based on time in field; FA - Qualify to medal final; FB - Qualify to consolation final; ADV - Advanced on referee decision

Mixed

Athlete	Event	Quarterfinal		Semifinal		Final	
Athlete	Event	Time	Rank	Time	Rank	Time	Rank
Teun Boer*; Selma Poutsma; Xandra Velzeboer; Jens van 't Wout; Melle van 't Wout*	2000 m relay	2:36.517	1 Q	2:53.319	3 FB	2:35.54 OR	5

Qualification legend: Q - Qualify based on position in heat; q - Qualify based on time in field; FA - Qualify to medal final; FB - Qualify to consolation final
* Melle van 't Wout skated the quarterfinal and Teun Boer the semi & B-final.

== Skeleton ==
The Netherlands qualified one female skeleton racer.

Athlete	Event	Run 1		Run 2		Run 3		Run 4		Total	
Athlete	Event	Time	Rank	Time	Rank	Time	Rank	Time	Rank	Time	Rank
Kimberley Bos	Women's	57.88	11	57.98	14	58.12	13	58.26	18	3:52.24	13

== Snowboarding ==
Alpine

Athlete	Event	Qualification		Round of 16	Quarterfinal	Semifinal	Final	
Athlete	Event	Time	Rank	Opposition Time	Opposition Time	Opposition Time	Opposition Time	Rank
Michelle Dekker	Women's parallel giant slalom	1:33.63	8 Q	Payer (AUT); L +0.13	Did not advance			

Cross

Athlete	Event	Seeding		1/8 final	Quarterfinal	Semifinal	Final	
Athlete	Event	Time	Rank	Position	Position	Position	Position	Rank
Glenn de Blois	Men's	1:08.68	8	4	Did not advance			

Park & Pipe

Athlete	Event	Qualification					Final				
Athlete	Event	Run 1	Run 2	Run 3	Best	Rank	Run 1	Run 2	Run 3	Best	Rank
Melissa Peperkamp	Women's big air	70.25	66.75	DNI	137.00	21	Did not advance				
Melissa Peperkamp	Women's slopestyle	60.71	67.75	—N/a	67.75	13	Did not advance				
Romy van Vreden	Women's big air	60.25	52.75	74.75	135.00	22	Did not advance				
Romy van Vreden	Women's slopestyle	22.08	39.91	—N/a	39.91	26	Did not advance				

== Speed skating ==
The Netherlands qualified eighteen speed skaters (nine per gender) through performances at the 2025-26 ISU Speed Skating World Cup. The Dutch Olympic Committee selected the maximum allowed delegation of nine men and nine women, largely based on the results of the Olympic qualification tournament, held in December 2025.

Men

Athlete	Event	Race	
Athlete	Event	Time	Rank
Jorrit Bergsma	10,000 m	12:40.48	3rd place, bronze medalist(s)
Jenning de Boo	500 m	33.88	2nd place, silver medalist(s)
Jenning de Boo	1000 m	1:06.78	2nd place, silver medalist(s)
Marcel Bosker	5000 m	6:17.47	11
Stijn van de Bunt	5000 m	6:12.94	9
Stijn van de Bunt	10,000 m	12:45.75	5
Sebas Diniz	500 m	34.461	5
Chris Huizinga	5000 m	6:11.58	7
Kjeld Nuis	1000 m	1:07.65	6
Kjeld Nuis	1500 m	1:42.82	3rd place, bronze medalist(s)
Tijmen Snel	1500 m	1:45.51	11
Joep Wennemars	500 m	34.89	21
Joep Wennemars	1000 m	1:07.58	5
Joep Wennemars	1500 m	1:43.05	4

Women

Athlete	Event	Race	
Athlete	Event	Time	Rank
Joy Beune	3000 m	3:58.12	4
Anna Boersma	500 m	38.013	15
Merel Conijn	3000 m	4:01.65	9
Merel Conijn	5000 m	6:46.28	2nd place, silver medalist(s)
Marijke Groenewoud	1500 m	1:55.16	10
Marijke Groenewoud	3000 m	4:01.35	8
Marijke Groenewoud	5000 m	6:58.33	7
Femke Kok	500 m	36.49 OR	1st place, gold medalist(s)
Femke Kok	1000 m	1:12.59	2nd place, silver medalist(s)
Femke Kok	1500 m	1:54.79	5
Jutta Leerdam	500 m	37.15	2nd place, silver medalist(s)
Jutta Leerdam	1000 m	1:12.31 OR	1st place, gold medalist(s)
Antoinette Rijpma-de Jong	1500 m	1:54.09	1st place, gold medalist(s)
Suzanne Schulting	1000 m	1:15.46	8

Mass start

Athlete	Event	Semifinal			Final		
Athlete	Event	Points	Time	Rank	Points	Time	Rank
Jorrit Bergsma	Men's	3	7:47.81	7 Q	68	7:55.50	1st place, gold medalist(s)
Stijn van de Bunt	Men's	24	7:51.46	3 Q	0	8:18.60	16
Marijke Groenewoud	Women's	2	8:37.46	8 Q	60	8:34.70	1st place, gold medalist(s)
Bente Kerkhoff	Women's	64	8:43.59	1 Q	3	9:08.16	10

Team pursuit

Athlete	Event	Quarterfinal		Semifinal		Final	
Athlete	Event	Opposition Time	Rank	Opposition Time	Rank	Opposition Time	Rank
Marcel Bosker; Stijn van der Bunt; Chris Huizinga	Men's	3:41.85	4 Q	Italy; L 3:40.67	2 FB	China; L 3:41.47	4
Marijke Groenewoud; Antoinette Rijpma-de Jong; Joy Beune	Women's	2:55.65	3 Q	Japan; W 2:55.84	1 FA	Canada; L 2:56.77	2nd place, silver medalist(s)

== See also ==
- Netherlands at the 2026 Winter Paralympics
