= Speed skating at the 2026 Winter Olympics =

Speed skating at the XXV Olympic Winter Games
- Speed skating pictogram
- Venue: Milano Speed Skating Stadium
- Dates: 7–21 February 2026
- No. of events: 14 (7 men, 7 women)
- Competitors: 164 (85 men, 79 women) from 23 nations

Speed skating at the 2026 Winter Olympics was held at the Milano Speed Skating Stadium in Milan, Italy between 7 and 21 February 2026. It was the 25th time speed skating was held at the Winter Olympics (18th time for women).

== Competition schedule ==
The following is the competition schedule for all speed skating events. With the exception of the Team pursuit events, all rounds of each event will be concluded within a single session.

All times are (UTC+1).

Day	Date	Time	Event
Day 1	Saturday, 7 February	16:00–18:35	Women's 3000 metres
Day 2	Sunday, 8 February	16:00–17:55	Men's 5000 metres
Day 3	Monday, 9 February	17:30–19:05	Women's 1000 metres
Day 5	Wednesday, 11 February	18:30–20:00	Men's 1000 metres
Day 6	Thursday, 12 February	16:30–18:00	Women's 5000 metres
Day 7	Friday, 13 February	16:00–18:05	Men's 10,000 metres
Day 8	Saturday, 14 February	16:00–17:45	Team pursuit women – Quarterfinals
Day 8	Saturday, 14 February	16:00–17:45	Men's 500 metres
Day 9	Sunday, 15 February	16:00–17:50	Team pursuit men – Quarterfinals
Day 9	Sunday, 15 February	16:00–17:50	Women's 500 metres
Day 11	Tuesday, 17 February	14:30–17:15	Team pursuit men – Finals
Day 11	Tuesday, 17 February	14:30–17:15	Team pursuit women – Finals
Day 13	Thursday, 19 February	16:30–17:55	Men's 1500 metres
Day 14	Friday, 20 February	16:30–17:50	Women's 1500 metres
Day 15	Saturday, 21 February	15:00–17:35	Mass start men
Day 15	Saturday, 21 February	15:00–17:35	Mass start women

== Medal summary ==
=== Medal table ===
* Host nation (Italy)

Rank	Nation	Gold	Silver	Bronze	Total
1	Netherlands	5	6	2	13
2	Italy*	3	0	2	5
3	United States	2	2	1	5
4	Norway	1	2	1	4
5	Canada	1	1	3	5
6	Czech Republic	1	1	0	2
7	China	1	0	2	3
8	Denmark	0	1	0	1
8	Poland	0	1	0	1
10	Japan	0	0	3	3
Totals (10 entries)		14	14	14	42

Denmark won its first ever medal in speed skating.

=== Men's events ===
Event	Gold		Silver		Bronze	
500 metres	Jordan Stolz; United States	33.77 OR	Jenning de Boo; Netherlands	33.88	Laurent Dubreuil; Canada	34.26
1000 metres	Jordan Stolz; United States	1:06.28 OR	Jenning de Boo; Netherlands	1:06.78	Ning Zhongyan; China	1:07.34
1500 metres	Ning Zhongyan; China	1:41.98 OR	Jordan Stolz; United States	1:42.75	Kjeld Nuis; Netherlands	1:42.82
5000 metres	Sander Eitrem; Norway	6:03.95 OR	Metoděj Jílek; Czech Republic	6:06.48	Riccardo Lorello; Italy	6:09.22
10,000 metres	Metoděj Jílek; Czech Republic	12:33.43	Vladimir Semirunniy; Poland	12:39.08	Jorrit Bergsma; Netherlands	12:40.48
Mass start	Jorrit Bergsma; Netherlands	68 pts	Viktor Hald Thorup; Denmark	47 pts	Andrea Giovannini; Italy	21 pts
Team pursuit	Italy; Davide Ghiotto; Andrea Giovannini; Michele Malfatti	3:39.20	United States; Ethan Cepuran; Casey Dawson; Emery Lehman	3:43.71	China; Li Wenhao; Liu Hanbin; Wu Yu; Ning Zhongyan^{[a]}	3:41.38

=== Women's events ===
Event	Gold		Silver		Bronze	
500 metres	Femke Kok; Netherlands	36.49 OR	Jutta Leerdam; Netherlands	37.15	Miho Takagi; Japan	37.27
1000 metres	Jutta Leerdam; Netherlands	1:12.31 OR	Femke Kok; Netherlands	1:12.59	Miho Takagi; Japan	1:13.95
1500 metres	Antoinette Rijpma-de Jong; Netherlands	1:54.09	Ragne Wiklund; Norway	1:54.15	Valérie Maltais; Canada	1:54.40
3000 metres	Francesca Lollobrigida; Italy	3:54.28 OR, PB	Ragne Wiklund; Norway	3:56.54	Valérie Maltais; Canada	3:56.93
5000 metres	Francesca Lollobrigida; Italy	6:46.17	Merel Conijn; Netherlands	6:46.27	Ragne Wiklund; Norway	6:46.34
Mass start	Marijke Groenewoud; Netherlands	60 pts	Ivanie Blondin; Canada	40 pts	Mia Kilburg; United States	20 pts
Team pursuit	Canada; Ivanie Blondin; Valérie Maltais; Isabelle Weidemann	2:55.81	Netherlands; Joy Beune; Marijke Groenewoud; Antoinette Rijpma-de Jong	2:56.77	Japan; Hana Noake; Ayano Sato; Miho Takagi; Momoka Horikawa^{[a]}	2:58.50

^{a} Skaters who did not participate in the final of the team pursuit event, but received medals as part of the team, having taken part in an earlier round.

== Participating nations ==
23 nations will be sending speed skaters to compete in the speed skating events.

- Austria (6)
- Belgium (6)
- Canada (15)
- China (15)
- Czech Republic (3)
- Denmark (1)
- Estonia (1)
- France (6)
- Germany (13)
- Great Britain (1)
- Hungary (1)
- Individual Neutral Athletes (3)
- Italy (10) (host)
- Japan (14)
- Kazakhstan (5)
- Netherlands (18)
- Norway (10)
- Poland (9)
- South Korea (8)
- Spain (2)
- Switzerland (3)
- Chinese Taipei (1)
- United States (13)

== Records ==
=== Olympic records ===
Event	Date	Round	Athlete	Country	Time	Record	Ref
Women's 3000 metres	7 February	Pair 8	Francesca Lollobrigida	Italy	3:54.28	OR	
Men's 5000 metres	8 February	Pair 9	Sander Eitrem	Norway	6:03.95	OR	
Women's 1000 meters	9 February	Pair 15	Jutta Leerdam	Netherlands	1:12.31	OR	
Men's 1000 meters	11 February	Pair 14	Jordan Stolz	United States	1:06.28	OR	
Men's 500 meters	14 February	Pair 13	Jordan Stolz	United States	33.77	OR	
Women's 500 metres	15 February	Pair 15	Femke Kok	Netherlands	36.49	OR	
Men's 1500 metres	19 February	Pair 13	Ning Zhongyan	China	1:41.98	OR	
