= 2018 European Speed Skating Championships – Women's mass start =

Women's mass start at the 2018 European Speed Skating Championships
- Venue: Kolomna Speed Skating Center
- Location: Kolomna, Russia
- Dates: 7 January
- Competitors: 16 from 11 nations
- Winning points: 65

Medalists
| gold medal | Francesca Lollobrigida | Italy |
| silver medal | Francesca Bettrone | Italy |
| bronze medal | Vanessa Herzog | Austria |

The women's mass start competition at the 2018 European Speed Skating Championships was held on 7 January 2018.

== Results ==
The race was started at 17:44.

| Rank | Name | Country | Time | Points |
|---|---|---|---|---|
| 1st place, gold medalist(s) | Francesca Lollobrigida | Italy | 8:38.69 | 65 |
| 2nd place, silver medalist(s) | Francesca Bettrone | Italy | 8:38.74 | 43 |
| 3rd place, bronze medalist(s) | Vanessa Herzog | Austria | 8:39.33 | 21 |
| 4 | Michelle Uhrig | Germany | 8:43.72 | 5 |
| 5 | Annouk van der Weijden | Netherlands | 9:06.98 | 5 |
| 6 | Magdalena Czyszczoń | Poland | 8:44.04 | 3 |
| 7 | Victoria Filyushkina | Russia | 9:18.80 | 3 |
| 8 | Carlijn Achtereekte | Netherlands | 8:39.45 | 1 |
| 9 | Luiza Złotkowska | Poland | 8:43.73 | 1 |
| 10 | Nikola Zdráhalová | Czech Republic | 8:40.65 | |
| 11 | Saskia Alusalu | Estonia | 8:42.23 | |
| 12 | Natálie Kerschbaummayr | Czech Republic | 8:42.74 | |
| 13 | Ramona Härdi | Switzerland | 8:43.37 | |
| 14 | Gemma Cooper | Great Britain | 8:43.77 | |
| 15 | Tatsiana Mikhailava | Belarus | 9:12.78 | |
| 16 | Yauheniya Varabyova | Belarus | DNF | |
