= 2024 European Speed Skating Championships – Women's 500 metres =

Women's 500 metres at the 2024 European Speed Skating Championships
- Venue: Thialf
- Location: Heerenveen, Netherlands
- Dates: 6 January
- Competitors: 20 from 11 nations
- Winning time: 37.28

Medalists
gold medal	Femke Kok	Netherlands
silver medal	Jutta Leerdam	Netherlands
bronze medal	Vanessa Herzog	Austria

The women's 500 metres competition at the 2024 European Speed Skating Championships was held on 6 January 2024.

== Results ==
The race was started at 14:46.

Rank	Pair	Lane	Name	Country	Time	Diff
1st place, gold medalist(s)	10	i	Femke Kok	Netherlands	37.28	
2nd place, silver medalist(s)	10	o	Jutta Leerdam	Netherlands	37.70	+0.42
3rd place, bronze medalist(s)	9	i	Vanessa Herzog	Austria	37.89	+0.61
4	8	o	Marrit Fledderus	Netherlands	38.00	+0.72
5	9	o	Andżelika Wójcik	Poland	38.04	+0.76
6	8	i	Karolina Bosiek	Poland	38.43	+1.15
7	7	i	Iga Wojtasik	Poland	38.74	+1.46
8	7	o	Martine Ripsrud	Norway	38.80	+1.52
9	5	i	Serena Pergher	Italy	38.880	+1.60
10	6	i	Julie Nistad Samsonsen	Norway	38.882	+1.60
11	6	o	Anna Ostlender	Germany	39.09	+1.81
12	2	i	Isabelle van Elst	Belgium	39.11	+1.83
13	4	i	Carina Jagtøyen	Norway	39.202	+1.92
14	4	o	Sophie Warmuth	Germany	39.206	+1.92
15	5	o	Ellia Smeding	Great Britain	39.22	+1.94
16	2	o	Luisa María González	Spain	39.23	+1.95
17	3	i	Fran Vanhoutte	Belgium	39.39	+2.11
18	3	o	Mihaela Hogaș	Romania	39.54	+2.26
19	1	o	Jasmin Güntert	Switzerland	40.30	+3.02
20	1	i	Bianca Stănică	Romania	40.57	+3.29
