= 2023 World Single Distances Speed Skating Championships – Women's 500 metres =

Women's 500 metres at the 2023 World Single Distances Speed Skating Championships
- Venue: Thialf
- Location: Heerenveen, Netherlands
- Date: 3 March
- Competitors: 24 from 11 nations
- Winning time: 37.28

Medalists
gold medal	Femke Kok	Netherlands
silver medal	Vanessa Herzog	Austria
bronze medal	Jutta Leerdam	Netherlands

The Women's 500 metres competition at the 2023 World Single Distances Speed Skating Championships was held on 3 March 2023.

== Results ==
The race was started at 20:53.

Rank	Pair	Lane	Name	Country	Time	Diff
1st place, gold medalist(s)	7	o	Femke Kok	Netherlands	37.28	
2nd place, silver medalist(s)	10	o	Vanessa Herzog	Austria	37.33	+0.05
3rd place, bronze medalist(s)	11	i	Jutta Leerdam	Netherlands	37.54	+0.26
4	11	o	Kim Min-sun	South Korea	37.56	+0.28
5	10	i	Erin Jackson	United States	37.62	+0.34
6	8	o	Miho Takagi	Japan	37.68	+0.40
7	12	o	Michelle de Jong	Netherlands	37.86	+0.58
8	12	i	Kimi Goetz	United States	37.89	+0.61
9	9	i	Yekaterina Aydova	Kazakhstan	38.08	+0.80
10	7	i	Kurumi Inagawa	Japan	38.09	+0.81
11	5	o	Jin Jingzhu	China	38.20	+0.92
12	9	o	Carolina Hiller	Canada	38.24	+0.96
13	8	i	Kako Yamane	Japan	38.33	+1.05
14	5	i	Lee Na-hyun	South Korea	38.38	+1.10
15	4	o	Alina Dauranova	Kazakhstan	38.54	+1.26
16	4	i	Brooklyn McDougall	Canada	38.56	+1.28
17	2	o	Ellia Smeding	Great Britain	38.63	+1.35
18	3	i	Kim Hyun-yung	South Korea	38.98	+1.70
19	6	o	Martine Ripsrud	Norway	39.09	+1.81
20	6	i	Li Qishi	China	39.26	+1.98
21	1	o	McKenzie Browne	United States	39.28	+2.00
22	1	i	Iga Wojtasik	Poland	39.52	+2.24
23	2	i	Zhang Lina	China	39.66	+2.38
24	3	o	Martyna Baran	Poland	39.77	+2.49
