= Melle van 't Wout =

Dutch speed skater (born 2000)

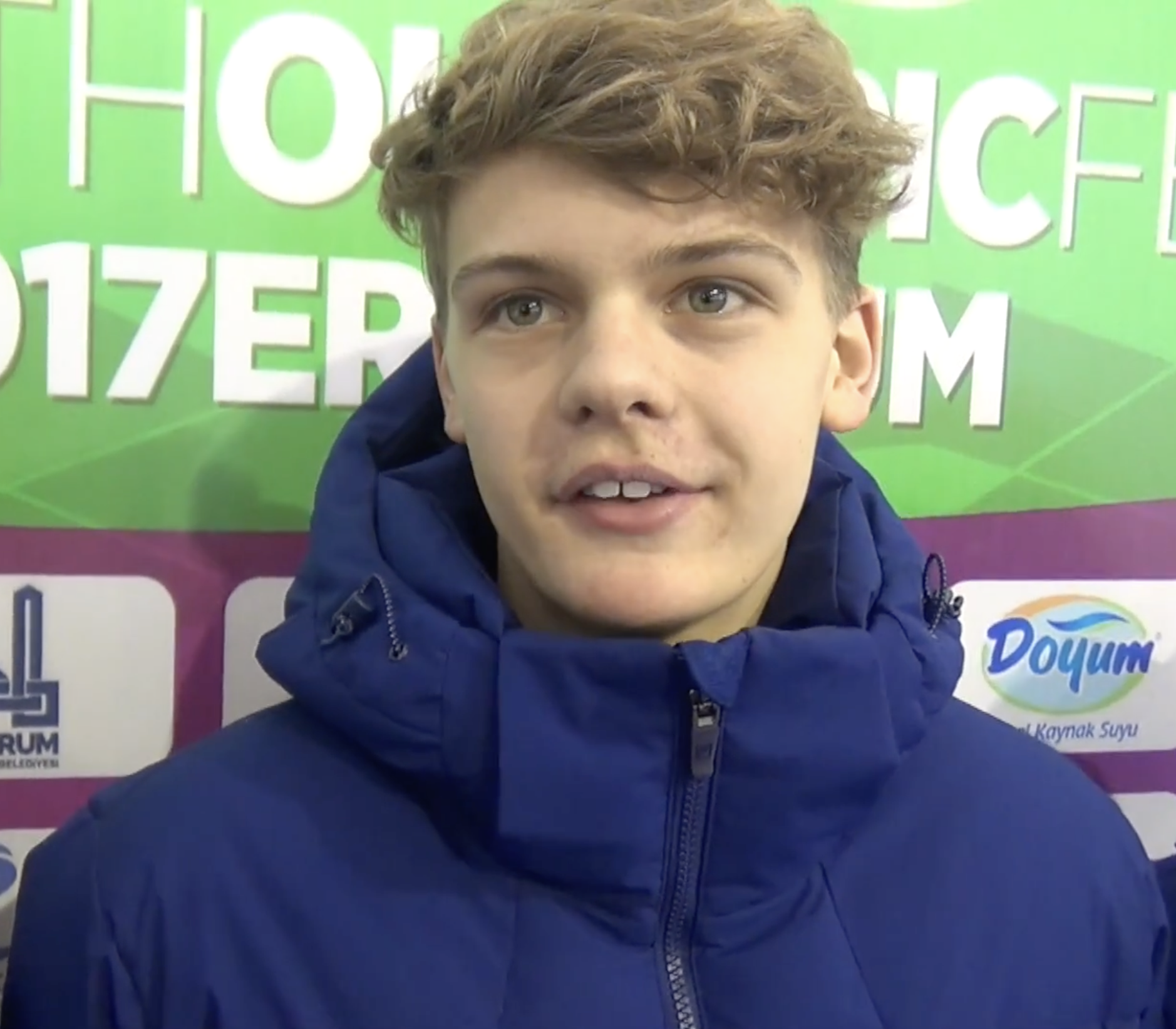
- Van 't Wout in 2017

Personal information
- Born: 18 February 2000 (age 26) Laren, Netherlands

Sport
- Country: Netherlands
- Sport: Short-track speed skating
Medal record
Men's short-track speed skating
Representing the Netherlands
Olympic Games
Gold medal – first place	2026 Milano Cortina	5000 m relay
Silver medal – second place	2026 Milano Cortina	500 m
European Championships
Gold medal – first place	2023 Gdańsk	5000 m relay
Gold medal – first place	2023 Gdańsk	2000m mixed relay
Gold medal – first place	2026 Tilburg	2000 m mixed relay
Silver medal – second place	2026 Tilburg	5000 m relay
Bronze medal – third place	2026 Tilburg	500 m
European Youth Olympics
Bronze medal – third place	2017 Erzurum	mixed relay
World Junior Championships
Silver medal – second place	2019 Montreal	3000 m relay

Melle van 't Wout (born 18 February 2000) is a Dutch short-track speed skater. He won gold medals with the Dutch relay teams at the 2023 European Championships. Van 't Wout is bronze medalist at the 2026 European Championships. He represented the Netherlands at the 2026 Winter Olympics, where he became an Olympic champion, and also won a silver medal.

== Career ==
At the age of four, Van ´t Wout moved with his family to Bracebridge, Canada. He played ice hockey as a child. At the age of thirteen, he switched to short-track speed skating. A year later the family moved back to the Netherlands.

Van ´t Wout made his international debut at the 2017 European Youth Olympics with a bronze medal at the mixed relay event. He obtained a silver medal with the Dutch relay team at the 2019 World Junior Championships.

At the senior level, he participated in the Dutch relay teams that obtained gold medals at the 2023 European Championships. His speed skating career was interrupted because of a long knee injury. At the 2026 European Championships he won the bronze medal at the 500 metre race. Van ´t Wout represents the Netherlands at the 2026 Winter Olympics.

== Personal life ==
Van 't Wout's younger brother Jens is also a short-track speed skater. Melle van ´t Wout has a relationship with Dutch short-track skater Selma Poutsma.
