= Van 't Wout =

Dutch family

Van ’t Wout is a Dutch family lineage. The first known ancestor is recorded as living in Stolwijk (County of Holland) from the early 1400s onward. Earliest generations were active as farmers, clergy, and millers. Current notable individuals include Rotterdam entrepreneur Willem van ’t Wout, politician Bas van 't Wout, and speed skaters Melle and Jens van 't Wout.

== Notable people ==
=== Nicolaas van ’t Wout (Geuzen member) ===
Nicolaas (1896–1942) was a factory executive from Maassluis who turned into a resistance member of the Geuzen during World War II. He was arrested and eventually died in the Buchenwald concentration camp. Van ’t Wout was posthumously awarded the Dutch Cross of Resistance by the Dutch royal family; a street in Maassluis is named in his honour.

=== Nicolaas van ’t Wout (politician) ===
Nicolaas (1920–2012) was a Dutch politician (ARP, later CDA) who served as mayor of Valkenburg, South Holland, from 1969 to 1985.

=== Willem van ’t Wout ===
Willem (born 1932) began his entrepreneurial activities in Rotterdam during World War II, when he diverted yeast from the occupying German authorities and supplied it to local bakers. In the 1950s he entered international scrap-metal trading, focusing on “politically complicated countries”. After meeting Fidel Castro, he purchased large quantities of Cuban nickel, then one of the country’s key exports. Willem described his stance toward Castro as apolitical, arguing that as a trade organisation, they could not realistically bring about regime change. Indiana Finance was his billion-euro trading company, originating from his early scrap-metal ventures. Willem was listed by Quote (magazine) as a notably affluent Dutchman and was named Rotterdammer of the Year in 1991. He also maintained longstanding ties with, and is a strong supporter of, Feyenoord. In the 2000s he began transferring the business to relatives and arranged the sale of two hundred used Rotterdam buses to Cuba. He later served as a Cuba expert for the investigative program Netwerk.

=== Erik van 't Wout ===
Erik (born 1961) is a Dutch actor known for the 1970s hit series Q & Q. He also appeared in A Bridge Too Far, Van de koele meren des doods, and the Dutch dub of The Fox and the Hound.

=== Bas van 't Wout ===
Bastiaan "Bas" (born 1979) is a Dutch politician of the People’s Party for Freedom and Democracy (VVD). He served as Minister of Economic Affairs and Climate Policy in 2021 and earlier as State Secretary for Social Affairs and Employment.

=== Melle and Jens van ’t Wout ===
Melle van 't Wout (born 18 February 2000) and his younger brother Jens van 't Wout (born 6 October 2001) are Dutch short-track speed skaters. Both competed at the 2026 Winter Olympics. At the Games, Melle won silver in the men's 500 metres, and Jens won gold in the men's 1,000, 1,500 metres, and bronze in the men's 500 metres. They were also members of the Netherlands team that won gold in the men's 5,000 metres relay.
