= 2025 World Single Distances Speed Skating Championships – Women's 500 metres =

Women's 500 metres at the 2025 World Single Distances Speed Skating Championships
- Venue: Vikingskipet
- Location: Hamar, Norway
- Dates: 14 March
- Competitors: 24 from 13 nations
- Winning time: 37.50

Medalists
gold medal	Femke Kok	Netherlands
silver medal	Jutta Leerdam	Netherlands
bronze medal	Kim Min-sun	South Korea

The Women's 500 metres competition at the 2025 World Single Distances Speed Skating Championships took place on 14 March 2025.

== Qualification ==
A total of 24 entry quotas were available for the event, with a maximum of three per country. The entry quotas were assigned to countries following a Special Qualification Ranking List based on rankings and performances of skaters during the 2024–25 ISU Speed Skating World Cup.

== Records ==
Prior to this competition, the existing world and track records were as follows.

	Time	Athlete	Date
World Record	36.36	Lee Sang-hwa (KOR)	16 November 2013
Track Record	37.25	Nao Kodaira (JPN)	22 February 2019

== Results ==
The race was started at 20:11.

Rank	Pair	Lane	Name	Country	Time	Diff
1st place, gold medalist(s)	7	o	Femke Kok	Netherlands	37.50	
2nd place, silver medalist(s)	8	i	Jutta Leerdam	Netherlands	37.69	+0.19
3rd place, bronze medalist(s)	12	i	Kim Min-sun	South Korea	37.73	+0.23
4	9	o	Kristina Silaeva	Kazakhstan	37.87	+0.37
5	11	o	Erin Jackson	United States	37.950	+0.45
6	10	i	Yukino Yoshida	Japan	37.956	+0.45
7	12	o	Andżelika Wójcik	Poland	38.04	+0.54
8	8	o	Lee Na-hyun	South Korea	38.122	+0.62
8	9	i	Serena Pergher	Italy	38.122	+0.62
10	6	i	Karolina Bosiek	Poland	38.14	+0.64
11	4	o	Rio Yamada	Japan	38.16	+0.66
12	11	i	Kaja Ziomek-Nogal	Poland	38.27	+0.77
13	7	i	Tian Ruining	China	38.28	+0.78
14	3	i	Angel Daleman	Netherlands	38.31	+0.81
15	4	i	Sophie Warmuth	Germany	38.33	+0.83
16	10	o	Kurumi Inagawa	Japan	38.50	+1.00
17	6	o	Julie Nistad Samsonsen	Norway	38.51	+1.01
18	5	i	Wang Jingziqian	China	38.63	+1.13
19	5	o	Anna Ostlender	Germany	38.69	+1.19
20	3	o	Rose Laliberté-Roy	Canada	38.74	+1.24
21	2	i	Fran Vanhoutte	Belgium	38.78	+1.28
22	1	i	Brooklyn McDougall	Canada	38.87	+1.37
23	1	o	Sofia Thorup	Denmark	38.89	+1.39
24	2	o	Darja Vazhenina	Kazakhstan	38.99	+1.49
