= Femke Kok =

Dutch speed skater (born 2000)

Personal information
- Nationality: Dutch
- Born: 5 October 2000 (age 25) Nij Beets, Netherlands

Sport
- Country: Netherlands
- Sport: Speed skating
- Event(s): 500 m, 1000 m
- Club: Team Reggeborgh
- Turned pro: 2019
Medal record
Women's speed skating
Representing the Netherlands
Olympic Games
Gold medal – first place	2026 Milano Cortina	500 m
Silver medal – second place	2026 Milano Cortina	1000 m
World Single Distances Championships
Gold medal – first place	2020 Salt Lake City	Team sprint
Gold medal – first place	2023 Heerenveen	500 m
Gold medal – first place	2024 Calgary	500 m
Gold medal – first place	2025 Hamar	500 m
Silver medal – second place	2021 Heerenveen	500 m
Silver medal – second place	2025 Hamar	1000 m
World Sprint Championships
Gold medal – first place	2022 Hamar	Team sprint
Gold medal – first place	2026 Heerenveen	Sprint
Silver medal – second place	2022 Hamar	Sprint
Silver medal – second place	2024 Inzell	Sprint
European Championships
Gold medal – first place	2022 Heerenveen	500 m
Gold medal – first place	2024 Heerenveen	500 m
Gold medal – first place	2024 Heerenveen	Team sprint
Silver medal – second place	2020 Heerenveen	1000 m
Silver medal – second place	2022 Heerenveen	Team sprint
Silver medal – second place	2023 Hamar	Sprint
Silver medal – second place	2025 Heerenveen	Sprint
Bronze medal – third place	2021 Heerenveen	Sprint
World Junior Championships
Gold medal – first place	2019 Baselga di Pinè	Overall
Gold medal – first place	2019 Baselga di Pinè	1500 m
Gold medal – first place	2019 Baselga di Pinè	Team sprint
Gold medal – first place	2020 Tomaszów Mazowiecki	Overall
Gold medal – first place	2020 Tomaszów Mazowiecki	500 m
Gold medal – first place	2020 Tomaszów Mazowiecki	1000 m
Gold medal – first place	2020 Tomaszów Mazowiecki	Team pursuit
Gold medal – first place	2020 Tomaszów Mazowiecki	Team sprint
Silver medal – second place	2019 Baselga di Pinè	500 m
Silver medal – second place	2019 Baselga di Pinè	1000 m
Silver medal – second place	2019 Baselga di Pinè	Team pursuit
Silver medal – second place	2020 Tomaszów Mazowiecki	1500 m

Femke Kok (pronounced [ˈfɛmkə ˈkɔk]; born 5 October 2000) is a Dutch speed skater who specializes in the sprint distances. At the 2026 Winter Olympics, she won a gold medal in the 500 metres event, setting a new Olympic record, and a silver medal in the 1000 metres event.

== Career ==
Kok became junior world champion at the 2019 World Junior Speed Skating Championships in February 2019 in Baselga di Pinè, Italy. In December 2019 Kok finished third at the 500m at the Dutch Single Distance Championships which qualified her for the European and World Single Distances Speed Skating Championships.

== Records ==
=== Personal records ===
Personal records
Speed skating
Event	Result	Date	Location	Notes
500 m	36.09	16 November 2025	Utah Olympic Oval, Salt Lake City	WR
1000 m	1:12.36	22 November 2025	Olympic Oval, Calgary	
1500 m	1:52.69	4 October 2025	Thialf, Heerenveen	
3000 m	4:14.33	29 September 2019	Thialf, Heerenveen	

=== World records ===
Event	Result	Date	Location	Notes
Sprint combination	1:51.99	25–26 January 2020	Thialf, Heerenveen	Junior world record
Team sprint	1:24.029	13 February 2020	Utah Olympic Oval, Salt Lake City	Together With Jutta Leerdam and Letitia de Jong
500 m	36.09	16 November 2025	Utah Olympic Oval, Salt Lake City	World record

=== Olympic records ===
Nr.	Event	Result	Date	Location	Notes
1.	Women's 1000m	1:12.59	9 February 2026	Milano Speed Skating Stadium, Milan	Record beaten by her teammate Jutta Leerdam shortly after
2.	Women's 500m	36.49	15 February 2026	Milano Speed Skating Stadium, Milan	

== Tournament overview ==
Season	Dutch Championships Single Distances	Dutch Championships Sprint	European Championships Single Distances	European Championships Sprint	World Championships Single Distances	World Championships Sprint	Olympic Games	World Cup GWC	World Championships Junior
2018–19	HEERENVEEN 5th 500m 8th 1000m 13th 1500m								BASELGA di PINÉ (silver) 500m (silver) 1500m (gold) 1000m 8th 3000m (gold) overall (silver) team sprint (gold) team pursuit
2019–20	HEERENVEEN (bronze) 500m 7th 1000m 14th 1500m	HEERENVEEN (silver) 500m 6th 1000m (gold) 500m (bronze) 1000m (bronze) overall	HEERENVEEN (silver) team sprint 4th 500m		SALT LAKE CITY 9th 500m (gold) team sprint			43rd 500m	TOMASZÓW MAZOWIECKI (gold) 500m (silver) 1500m (gold) 1000m 4th 3000m (gold) overall (gold) team sprint (gold) team pursuit
2020–21	HEERENVEEN (gold) 500m (silver) 1000m	HEERENVEEN (gold) 500m (gold) 1000m (gold) 500m (silver) 1000m (silver) overall		HEERENVEEN (silver) 500m (bronze) 1000m (silver) 500m (bronze) 1000m (bronze) overall	HEERENVEEN (silver) 500m			(gold) 500m (bronze) 1000m	
2021–22	HEERENVEEN (gold) 500m (silver) 1000m		HEERENVEEN (gold) 500 m (silver) 1000 m			HAMAR (gold) 500m (silver) 1000m (gold) 500m (silver) 1000m (silver) overall (gold) team sprint	BEIJING 6th 500 m	4th 500m 6th 1000m	
2022–23	HEERENVEEN (gold) 500m 4th 1000m	HEERENVEEN (gold) 500m (silver) 1000m (silver) 500m (silver) 1000m (silver) overall		HAMAR (gold) 500m (silver) 1000m (gold) 500m (silver) 1000m (silver) overall	HEERENVEEN (gold) 500m			9th 500m 42nd 1000m	
2023–24	HEERENVEEN (gold) 500m DNF 1000m		HEERENVEEN (gold) 500 m (gold) team sprint		CALGARY (gold) 500m	INZELL (gold) 500m (bronze) 1000m (gold) 500m (bronze) 1000m (silver) overall		(bronze) 500m 5th 1000m	
2024–25	HEERENVEEN (gold) 500m (silver) 1000m	HEERENVEEN (gold) 500m (bronze) 1000m WDR 500m: 1000m; NC overall		HEERENVEEN (gold) 500m (silver) 1000m (gold) 500m (silver) 1000m (silver) overall	HAMAR (gold) 500m (silver) 1000m			10th 500m	
2025–26	HEERENVEEN (gold) 500m (gold) 1000m						MILANO CORTINA (gold) 500m (silver) 1000m		

== World Cup overview ==
Season	500 meter										
2019–20	–	–	–	–	–	4th(b)	–				
2020–21	1st place, gold medalist(s)	1st place, gold medalist(s)	1st place, gold medalist(s)	1st place, gold medalist(s)							
2021–22	11th	8th	12th	9th	3rd place, bronze medalist(s)	5th	–	–	2nd place, silver medalist(s)	4th	
2022–23	12th	6th	4th	4th	7th	–					
2023–24	3rd place, bronze medalist(s)	1st place, gold medalist(s)	-	9th	3rd place, bronze medalist(s)	2nd place, silver medalist(s)	3rd place, bronze medalist(s)	4th	2nd place, silver medalist(s)	1st place, gold medalist(s)	
2024–25	–	–	–	–	1st place, gold medalist(s)	1st place, gold medalist(s)	1st place, gold medalist(s)	–	–	1st place, gold medalist(s)	1st place, gold medalist(s)

Season	1000 meter						
2019–20							
2020–21	3rd place, bronze medalist(s)	3rd place, bronze medalist(s)					
2021–22	10th	17th	5th	–	5th		
2022–23	–	–	–	–	14th	–	
2023–24	4th	-	1st(b)	4th	10th	3rd place, bronze medalist(s)	2nd place, silver medalist(s)
2024–25	–	–	–	–	–	–	

== Medals won ==
Championship	Gold (gold)	Silver (silver)	Bronze (bronze)
Dutch Single Distances	4	2	1
Dutch Sprint	0	2	1
Dutch Sprint distances	5	5	1
European Single Distances	3	2	0
World Single Distances	3	1	0
World Junior Allround	2	0	0
World Junior Single Distances	6	4	0
World Cup GWC	1	0	2
European Sprint	0	1	1
European Sprint distances	2	4	2
