= 2025 World Single Distances Speed Skating Championships – Women's 1000 metres =

Women's 1000 metres at the 2025 World Single Distances Speed Skating Championships
- Venue: Vikingskipet
- Location: Hamar, Norway
- Dates: 15 March
- Competitors: 24 from 12 nations
- Winning time: 1:14.75

Medalists
gold medal	Miho Takagi	Japan
silver medal	Femke Kok	Netherlands
bronze medal	Jutta Leerdam	Netherlands

The Women's 1000 metres competition at the 2025 World Single Distances Speed Skating Championships took place on 15 March 2025.

== Qualification ==
A total of 24 entry quotas were available for the event, with a maximum of three per country. The entry quotas were assigned to countries following a Special Qualification Ranking List based on rankings and performances of skaters during the 2024–25 ISU Speed Skating World Cup.

== Records ==
Prior to this competition, the existing world and track records were as follows.

	Time	Athlete	Date
World Record	1:11.61	Brittany Bowe (USA)	9 March 2019
Track Record	1:13.75	Miho Takagi (JPN)	28 February 2020

== Results ==
The race was started at 14:00.

Rank	Pair	Lane	Name	Country	Time	Diff
1st place, gold medalist(s)	11	o	Miho Takagi	Japan	1:14.75	
2nd place, silver medalist(s)	2	i	Femke Kok	Netherlands	1:14.98	+0.23
3rd place, bronze medalist(s)	12	i	Jutta Leerdam	Netherlands	1:15.05	+0.30
4	11	i	Han Mei	China	1:15.49	+0.74
5	10	o	Antoinette Rijpma-de Jong	Netherlands	1:15.51	+0.76
6	8	i	Rio Yamada	Japan	1:15.61	+0.86
7	6	o	Yin Qi	China	1:15.79	+1.04
8	8	o	Yukino Yoshida	Japan	1:16.06	+1.31
9	3	o	Nikola Zdráhalová	Czech Republic	1:16.09	+1.34
10	6	i	Kim Min-sun	South Korea	1:16.11(0)	+1.36
11	1	o	Erin Jackson	United States	1:16.11(4)	+1.36
12	10	i	Natalia Jabrzyk	Poland	1:16.14	+1.39
13	12	o	Brittany Bowe	United States	1:16.23	+1.48
14	7	i	Karolina Bosiek	Poland	1:16.51	+1.76
15	1	i	Lee Na-hyun	South Korea	1:16.82	+2.07
16	5	i	Isabelle van Elst	Belgium	1:16.83	+2.08
17	4	i	Kristina Silaeva	Kazakhstan	1:17.02	+2.27
18	7	o	Béatrice Lamarche	Canada	1:17.27	+2.52
19	9	i	Andżelika Wójcik	Poland	1:17.28	+2.53
20	3	i	Anna Ostlender	Germany	1:17.50	+2.75
21	2	o	Sofia Thorup	Denmark	1:17.69	+2.94
22	4	o	Lea Sophie Scholz	Germany	1:17.83	+3.08
23	5	o	Kang Soo-min	South Korea	1:17.98	+3.23
24	9	o	Nadezhda Morozova	Kazakhstan	1:18.34	+3.59
