= Odin By Farstad =

Norwegian speed skater

Odin Farstad
Personal information
- Full name: Odin By Farstad
- Born: 1 December 1997 (age 28) Malvik Municipality, Norway

Sport
- Country: Norway
- Sport: Speed skating
- Event: Sprint
- Club: SK Falken
Medal record
World Single Distances Championships
Bronze medal – third place	2020 Salt Lake City	Team sprint
European Championships
Silver medal – second place	2020 Heerenven	Team sprint

Odin By Farstad (born 1 December 1997) is a Norwegian speed skater.

He won a medal at the 2020 World Single Distances Speed Skating Championships.
