= Angelina Golikova =

Russian speed skater (born 1991)

Personal information
- Full name: Angelina Romanovna Golikova
- Nationality: (Russia) Russian
- Born: 17 September 1991 (age 35) Moscow, Russia
- Height: 1.72 m (5 ft 8 in)
- Weight: 72 kg (159 lb)

Sport
- Country: Russia
- Sport: Speed skating
- Event: Sprint
- Club: Dynamo
- Coached by: Alexandra Zharkova; Tatyana Agafoshina
Medal record
Women's speed skating
Representing ROC
Olympic Games
| Bronze medal – third place | 2022 Beijing | 500 m |
Representing Russian Skating Union
World Single Distances Championships
| Gold medal – first place | 2021 Heerenveen | 500 m |
Representing Russia
World Single Distance Championships
| Silver medal – second place | 2020 Salt Lake City | 500 m |
| Silver medal – second place | 2020 Salt Lake City | Team sprint |
| Bronze medal – third place | 2019 Inzell | Team sprint |
European Championships
| Gold medal – first place | 2018 Kolomna | Team sprint |
| Gold medal – first place | 2020 Heerenveen | Team sprint |
| Silver medal – second place | 2018 Kolomna | 500 m |
| Silver medal – second place | 2021 Heerenveen | Sprint |
| Silver medal – second place | 2022 Heerenveen | 500 m |
| Bronze medal – third place | 2020 Heerenveen | 500 m |
Winter Universiade
| Bronze medal – third place | 2013 Trentino | 1000 m |

Angelina Romanovna Golikova (Russian: Ангелина Романовна Голикова; born 17 September 1991) is a Russian speed skater. She competed at the 2014 World Sprint Speed Skating Championships in Nagano, and at the 2014 Winter Olympics in Sochi.

== Records ==
=== Personal records ===
Personal records
Women's speed skating
| Event | Result | Date | Location | Notes |
| 500 m | 36.66 | 11 December 2021 | Calgary Olympic Oval, Calgary | Russian national record |
| 1000 m | 1:12.77 | 4 December 2021 | Utah Olympic Oval, Salt Lake City | |
| 1500 m | 2:01.46 | 12 December 2019 | Utah Olympic Oval, Salt Lake City | |
| 3000 m | 4:22.87 | 8 November 2009 | Kolomna Speed Skating Center, Kolomna | |

== World Cup podiums ==
| Date | Season | Location | Rank | Event |
|---|---|---|---|---|
| 18 November 2018 | 2018–19 | Obihiro | 1st place, gold medalist(s) | Team sprint |
| 2 February 2019 | 2018–19 | Hamar | 3rd place, bronze medalist(s) | 500 m |
| 3 February 2019 | 2018–19 | Hamar | 2nd place, silver medalist(s) | 500 m |
| 9 March 2019 | 2018–19 | Salt Lake City | 3rd place, bronze medalist(s) | 500 m |
| 15 November 2019 | 2019–20 | Minsk | 2nd place, silver medalist(s) | Team sprint |
| 22 November 2019 | 2019–20 | Tomaszów Mazowiecki | 1st place, gold medalist(s) | Team sprint |
| 6 December 2019 | 2019–20 | Nur-Sultan | 2nd place, silver medalist(s) | Team sprint |
| 7 December 2019 | 2019–20 | Nur-Sultan | 1st place, gold medalist(s) | 500 m |
| 13 December 2019 | 2019–20 | Nagano | 2nd place, silver medalist(s) | 500 m |
| 13 December 2019 | 2019–20 | Nagano | 2nd place, silver medalist(s) | Team sprint |
| 15 December 2019 | 2019–20 | Nagano | 1st place, gold medalist(s) | 500 m |
| 8 February 2020 | 2019–20 | Calgary | 2nd place, silver medalist(s) | 500 m |
| 23 January 2021 | 2020–21 | Heerenveen | 2nd place, silver medalist(s) | 500 m |
| 24 January 2021 | 2020–21 | Heerenveen | 2nd place, silver medalist(s) | 500 m |
| 30 January 2021 | 2020–21 | Heerenveen | 2nd place, silver medalist(s) | 500 m |
| 31 January 2021 | 2020–21 | Heerenveen | 2nd place, silver medalist(s) | 500 m |
| 31 January 2021 | 2020–21 | Heerenveen | 2nd place, silver medalist(s) | 1000 m |
| 13 November 2021 | 2021–22 | Tomaszów Mazowiecki | 2nd place, silver medalist(s) | 500 m |

=== Overall rankings ===
| Season | Event | Rank |
|---|---|---|
| 2020–21 | 500 m | 2nd place, silver medalist(s) |
