= Ekaterina Sloeva =

Belarusian speed skater

Personal information
- Nationality: Russian ( –2019); Belarusian (2019– )
- Born: 23 May 1999 (age 27) Irkutsk, Russia
- Height: 1.75 m (5 ft 9 in)
- Parent: Oksana Ravilova (mother)

Sport
- Sport: Speed skating
Medal record
Women's speed skating
Representing Belarus
European Championships
Silver medal – second place	2022 Heerenveen	Team sprint

Ekaterina Sloeva (born 23 May 1999) is a Belarusian speed skater. She represented Belarus at the 2022 Winter Olympics.

== Career ==
Sloeva made her international debut at the 2021 European Speed Skating Championships. She competed at the 2022 European Speed Skating Championships where she won a silver medal in the women's team sprint event.

Sloeva represented Belarus at the 2022 Winter Olympics in the 1500 metres and finished with a time of 1:58.41.
