= 2022 European Speed Skating Championships =

International speed skating competition

- Venue: Thialf, Heerenveen, Netherlands
- Dates: 7–9 January

The 2022 European Speed Skating Championships was held between 7 and 9 January 2022, at the Thialf in Heerenveen, Netherlands.

== Schedule ==
All times are local (UTC+1).

Date	Time	Events
7 January	18:55	Team sprint women Team pursuit men 3000 m women 1000 m men
8 January	14:30	Team sprint men 500 m women 5000 m men 1500 m women
9 January	14:05	Team pursuit women 1500 m men 1000 m women 500 m men Mass start women Mass start men

== Medal summary ==
=== Medal table ===
* Host nation (Netherlands)

Rank	Nation	Gold	Silver	Bronze	Total
1	Netherlands*	11	8	2	21
2	Poland	2	0	1	3
3	Belgium	1	0	0	1
4	Norway	0	3	3	6
5	Russia	0	1	5	6
6	Belarus	0	1	0	1
6	Switzerland	0	1	0	1
8	Italy	0	0	3	3
Totals (8 entries)		14	14	14	42

=== Men's events ===
Event	Gold		Silver		Bronze	
500 m	Piotr Michalski; Poland	34.60	Merijn Scheperkamp; Netherlands	34.61	Dai Dai N'tab; Netherlands	34.76
1000 m	Thomas Krol; Netherlands	1:07.77	Kjeld Nuis; Netherlands	1:07.86	Kai Verbij; Netherlands	1:07.94
1500 m	Kjeld Nuis; Netherlands	1:43.60	Thomas Krol; Netherlands	1:43.91	Allan Dahl Johansson; Norway	1:44.16
5000 m	Patrick Roest; Netherlands	6:11.54	Jorrit Bergsma; Netherlands	6:13.47	Hallgeir Engebråten; Norway	6:13.67
Team pursuit	Netherlands; Marcel Bosker; Sven Kramer; Patrick Roest	3:37.97 TR	Norway; Hallgeir Engebråten; Allan Dahl Johansson; Sverre Lunde Pedersen	3:38.92	Italy; Davide Ghiotto; Andrea Giovannini; Michele Malfatti	3:43.41
Team sprint	Netherlands; Merijn Scheperkamp; Tijmen Snel; Kai Verbij	1:19.71	Norway; Håvard Holmefjord Lorentzen; Bjørn Magnussen; Henrik Fagerli Rukke	1:19.83	Poland; Marek Kania; Piotr Michalski; Damian Żurek	1:20.54
Mass start	Bart Swings; Belgium	61 pts	Livio Wenger; Switzerland	40 pts	Ruslan Zakharov; Russia	20 pts

=== Women's events ===
Event	Gold		Silver		Bronze	
500 m	Femke Kok; Netherlands	37.32	Angelina Golikova; Russia	37.43	Daria Kachanova; Russia	37.58
1000 m	Jutta Leerdam; Netherlands	1:13.60	Femke Kok; Netherlands	1:14.80	Daria Kachanova; Russia	1:14.94
1500 m	Antoinette de Jong; Netherlands	1:53.81	Ireen Wüst; Netherlands	1:54.08	Francesca Lollobrigida; Italy	1:54.50
3000 m	Irene Schouten; Netherlands	3:56.62	Antoinette de Jong; Netherlands	3:59.79	Francesca Lollobrigida; Italy	4:00.61
Team pursuit	Netherlands; Antoinette de Jong; Irene Schouten; Ireen Wüst	2:54.12 TR	Norway; Marit Fjellanger Bøhm; Sofie Karoline Haugen; Ragne Wiklund	2:58.54	Russia; Elizaveta Golubeva; Evgeniia Lalenkova; Natalya Voronina	2:59.32
Team sprint	Poland; Karolina Bosiek; Andżelika Wójcik; Kaja Ziomek	1:27.26	Belarus; Hanna Nifantava; Ekaterina Sloeva; Yauheniya Varabyova	1:31.18	Norway; Ane By Farstad; Martine Ripsrud; Julie Nistad Samsonsen	1:31.43
Mass start	Irene Schouten; Netherlands	60 pts	Marijke Groenewoud; Netherlands	42 pts	Elizaveta Golubeva; Russia	20 pts
