= 2020 European Speed Skating Championships =

International speed skating competition

- Venue: Thialf, Heerenveen, Netherlands
- Dates: 10–12 January
- Competitors: 126 from 19 nations

The 2020 European Speed Skating Championships were held from 10 to 12 January 2020 at the Thialf in Heerenveen, Netherlands.

== Schedule ==
All times are local (UTC+1).

| Date | Time | Events |
|---|---|---|
| 10 January | 19:30 | 1500m women 1500m men Team sprint women Team sprint men |
| 11 January | 13:40 | 500m women 500m men 3000m women 5000m men |
| 12 January | 14:15 | Team pursuit women Team pursuit men 1000m women 1000m men Mass start women Mass start men |

== Medal summary ==
=== Medal table ===
* Host nation (Netherlands)

| Rank | Nation | Gold | Silver | Bronze | Total |
|---|---|---|---|---|---|
| 1 | Netherlands* | 8 | 5 | 3 | 16 |
| 2 | Russia | 5 | 6 | 6 | 17 |
| 3 | Belgium | 1 | 0 | 0 | 1 |
| 4 | Italy | 0 | 1 | 1 | 2 |
| 4 | Norway | 0 | 1 | 1 | 2 |
| 6 | Austria | 0 | 1 | 0 | 1 |
| 7 | Belarus | 0 | 0 | 1 | 1 |
| 7 | Poland | 0 | 0 | 1 | 1 |
| 7 | Switzerland | 0 | 0 | 1 | 1 |
| Totals (9 entries) | | 14 | 14 | 14 | 42 |

=== Men's events ===
| Event | Gold | | Silver | | Bronze | |
|---|---|---|---|---|---|---|
| 500 m | Pavel Kulizhnikov; Russia | 34.38 | Dai Dai Ntab; Netherlands | 34.47 | Ruslan Murashov; Russia | 34.59 |
| 1000 m | Pavel Kulizhnikov; Russia | 1:07.09 TR | Thomas Krol; Netherlands | 1:07.82 | Kai Verbij; Netherlands | 1:08.38 |
| 1500 m | Thomas Krol; Netherlands | 1:43.67 | Denis Yuskov; Russia | 1:44.80 | Patrick Roest; Netherlands | 1:44.82 |
| 5000 m | Patrick Roest; Netherlands | 6:08.92 TR | Sven Kramer; Netherlands | 6:10.76 | Denis Yuskov; Russia | 6:12.26 |
| Team pursuit | Netherlands; Patrick Roest; Marcel Bosker; Sven Kramer | 3:40.63 | Russia; Denis Yuskov; Alexander Rumyantsev; Danila Semerikov | 3:42.48 | Norway; Sverre Lunde Pedersen; Håvard Bøkko; Hallgeir Engebråten | 3:43.39 |
| Team sprint | Russia; Ruslan Murashov; Viktor Mushtakov; Pavel Kulizhnikov | 1:18.92 | Norway; Bjørn Magnussen; Håvard Holmefjord Lorentzen; Odin By Farstad | 1:20.18 | Switzerland; Oliver Grob; Christian Oberbichler; Livio Wenger | 1:21.44 |
| Mass start | Bart Swings; Belgium | 60 pts | Arjan Stroetinga; Netherlands | 40 pts | Danila Semerikov; Russia | 20 pts |

=== Women's events ===
| Event | Gold | | Silver | | Bronze | |
|---|---|---|---|---|---|---|
| 500 m | Olga Fatkulina; Russia | 37.40 | Vanessa Herzog; Austria | 37.49 | Angelina Golikova; Russia | 37.50 |
| 1000 m | Jutta Leerdam; Netherlands | 1:13.67 | Daria Kachanova; Russia | 1:13.90 | Yekaterina Shikhova; Russia | 1:14.48 |
| 1500 m | Ireen Wüst; Netherlands | 1:54.88 | Evgeniia Lalenkova; Russia | 1:55.22 | Yekaterina Shikhova; Russia | 1:55.31 |
| 3000 m | Esmee Visser; Netherlands | 3:59.15 | Natalya Voronina; Russia | 4:01.660 | Francesca Lollobrigida; Italy | 4:01.663 |
| Team pursuit | Netherlands; Ireen Wüst; Melissa Wijfje; Antoinette de Jong | 2:57.97 | Russia; Elizaveta Kazelina; Natalia Voronina; Evgeniia Lalenkova | 2:59.04 | Belarus; Maryna Zuyeva; Yeugeniya Vorobyova; Tatsiana Mikhailava | 3:05.47 |
| Team sprint | Russia; Angelina Golikova; Olga Fatkulina; Daria Kachanova | 1:26.17 | Netherlands; Femke Kok; Letitia de Jong; Ireen Wüst | 1:26.62 | Poland; Andżelika Wójcik; Kaja Ziomek; Natalia Czerwonka | 1:28.25 |
| Mass start | Irene Schouten; Netherlands | 62 pts | Francesca Lollobrigida; Italy | 41 pts | Melissa Wijfje; Netherlands | 22 pts |
