= Daria Kachanova =

Russian speed skater (born 1997)

Personal information
- Nationality: Russian
- Born: 17 September 1997 (age 28) Nizhny Novgorod, Russia
- Height: 1.75 m (5 ft 9 in)

Sport
- Country: Russia
- Sport: Speed skating
- Event: 1000 m
- Club: Nizhny Novgorod Centre of Sports Preparation
Medal record
World Single Distance Championships
Silver medal – second place	2020 Salt Lake City	Team sprint
Bronze medal – third place	2019 Inzell	Team sprint
European Championships
Gold medal – first place	2020 Heerenveen	Team sprint
Silver medal – second place	2019 Collalbo	Sprint
Silver medal – second place	2020 Heerenveen	1000 m
Bronze medal – third place	2022 Heerenveen	500 m
Bronze medal – third place	2022 Heerenveen	1000 m

Daria Dmitrievna Kachanova (Russian: Дарья Дмитриевна Качанова; born 17 September 1997) is a Russian speed skater who specializes in the sprint distances.

== Career ==
Kachanova won the 2015/2106 ISU Junior World Cup title at the 500 m event. In March 2016 she won the gold medal in the 500m at the 2016 World Junior Championships in Changchun, China.

At the second competition weekend of the 2018–19 ISU Speed Skating World Cup she finished third in the second 500m event behind Nao Kodaira and Vanessa Herzog. At the second competition weekend she finished third in the first 500 m event as well as in the 1000 m event.

== World Cup podiums ==
Date	Season	Location	Rank	Event
23 November 2018	2018–19	Tomakomai	3rd place, bronze medalist(s)	500 m
7 December 2018	2018–19	Tomaszów Mazowiecki	3rd place, bronze medalist(s)	500 m
7 December 2018	2018–19	Tomaszów Mazowiecki	3rd place, bronze medalist(s)	1000 m
15 November 2019	2019–20	Minsk	2nd place, silver medalist(s)	Team sprint
16 November 2019	2019–20	Minsk	2nd place, silver medalist(s)	500 m
22 November 2019	2019–20	Tomaszów Mazowiecki	1st place, gold medalist(s)	Team sprint
23 November 2019	2019–20	Tomaszów Mazowiecki	3rd place, bronze medalist(s)	500 m
6 December 2019	2019–20	Nur-Sultan	2nd place, silver medalist(s)	1000 m
6 December 2019	2019–20	Nur-Sultan	2nd place, silver medalist(s)	Team sprint
7 December 2019	2019–20	Nur-Sultan	2nd place, silver medalist(s)	500 m
13 December 2019	2019–20	Nagano	2nd place, silver medalist(s)	Team sprint
31 January 2021	2020–21	Heerenveen	3rd place, bronze medalist(s)	500 m

Source: ISU

== Personal records ==
Personal records
Women's speed skating
Event	Result	Date	Location	Notes
500 m	36.98	4 December 2021	Utah Olympic Oval, Salt Lake City	
1000 m	1:12.91	4 December 2021	Utah Olympic Oval, Salt Lake City	
1500 m	1:56.67	30 January 2021	Olympic Oval, Calgary	
3000 m	4:39.11	11 March 2013	Kolomna Speed Skating Center, Kolomna	
