= Vanessa Herzog =

Austrian speed skater (born 1995)

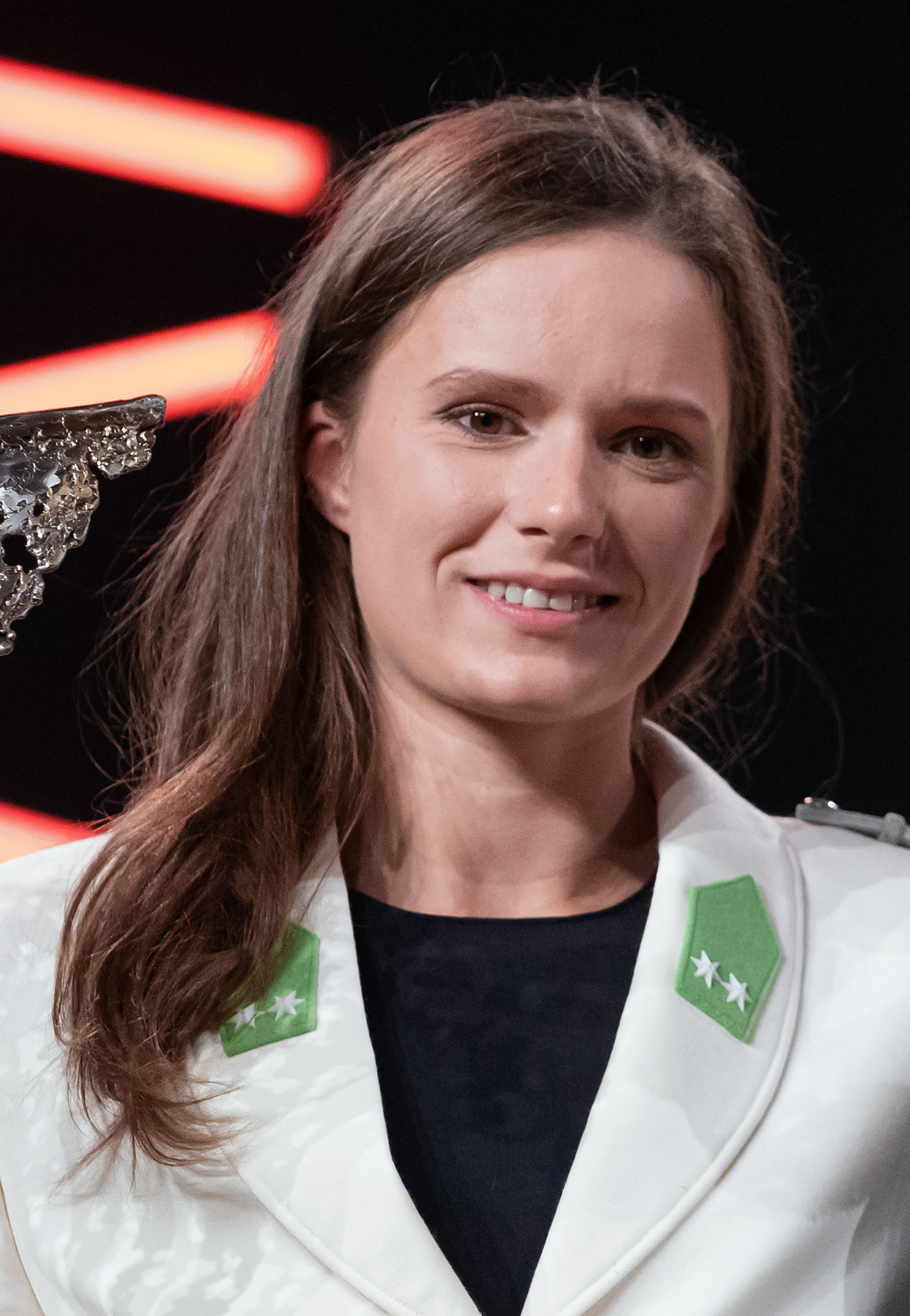
- Herzog in 2019

Personal information
- Nationality: Austrian
- Born: 4 July 1995 (age 31) Innsbruck, Austria
- Height: 1.75 m (5 ft 9 in)
- Weight: 70 kg (154 lb)

Sport
- Country: Austria
- Sport: Speed skating
- Events: 500 m, 1000 m
- Club: ESC Otrouza
Medal record
Women's speed skating
Representing Austria
World Single Distances Championships
Gold medal – first place	2019 Inzell	500 m
Silver medal – second place	2019 Inzell	1000 m
Silver medal – second place	2023 Heerenveen	500 m
World Sprint Championships
Bronze medal – third place	2022 Hamar	Sprint
European Championships
Gold medal – first place	2018 Kolomna	500 m
Gold medal – first place	2019 Collalbo	Sprint
Silver medal – second place	2018 Kolomna	1000 m
Silver medal – second place	2020 Heerenven	500 m
Bronze medal – third place	2018 Kolomna	Mass start
Bronze medal – third place	2023 Hamar	Sprint
Bronze medal – third place	2024 Heerenveen	500 m
Bronze medal – third place	2024 Heerenveen	1000 m

Vanessa Herzog (née Bittner; born 4 July 1995) is an Austrian speed skater. She competed at the 2013 World Sprint Championships in Salt Lake City, and at the 2014 Winter Olympics in Sochi.

Herzog is the current holder of the Austrian records in the 500, 1000 and 1500 metres.

She married her coach Thomas Herzog on 16 September 2016.

== Personal records ==
Personal records
Speed skating
Event	Result	Date	Location	Notes
500 m	36.83	10 March 2019	Utah Olympic Oval, Salt Lake City	Current Austrian record.
1000 m	1:13.43	10 December 2017	Utah Olympic Oval, Salt Lake City	Current Austrian record.
1500 m	1:54.92	10 December 2022	Olympic Oval, Calgary	Current Austrian record.
3000 m	4:21.39	16 January 2016	Max Aicher Arena, Inzell	
5000 m	8:12.34	23 December 2012	Olympia Eisstadion, Innsbruck	
