= Hanna Nifantava =

Belarusian speed skater

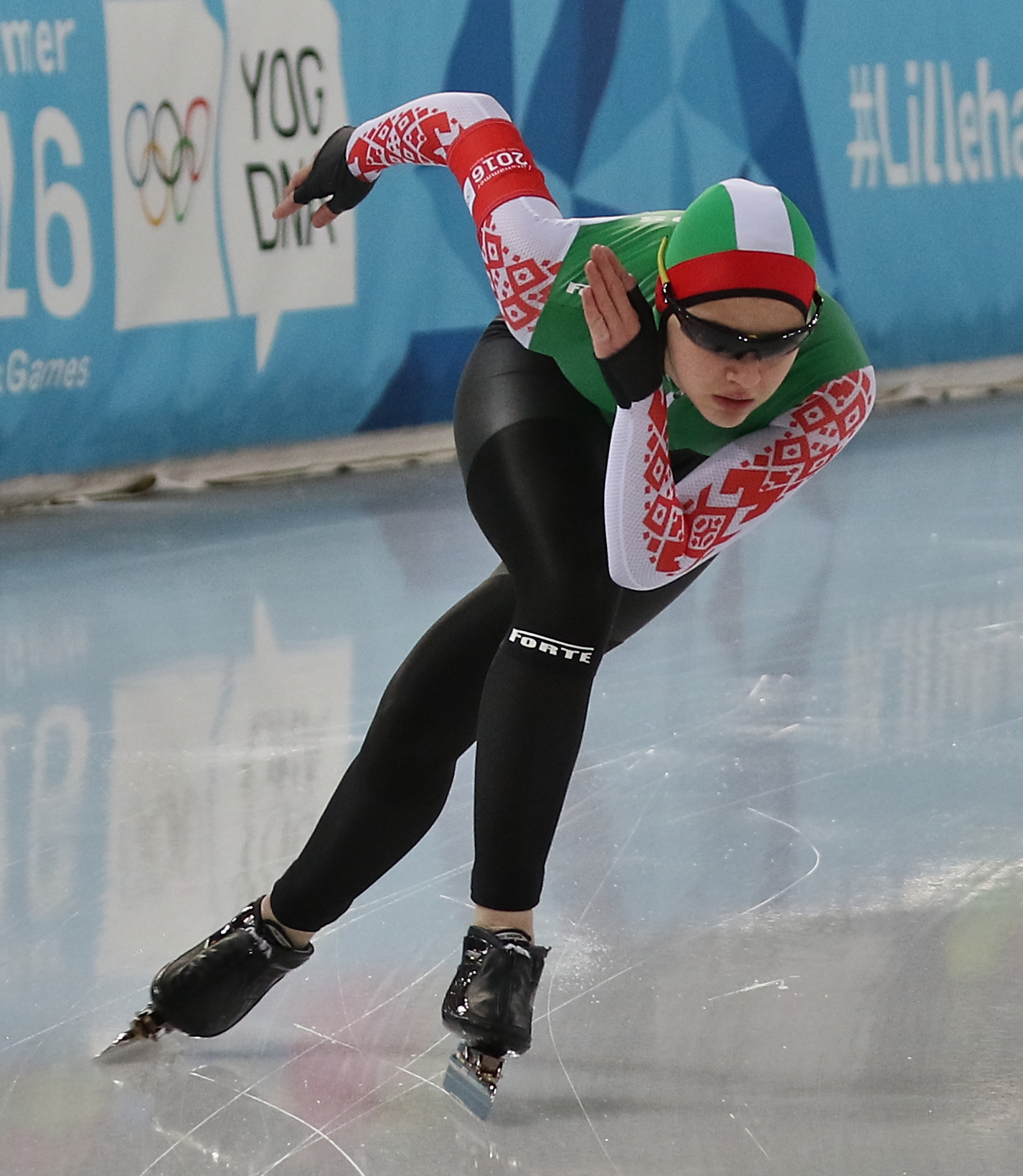

Personal information
- Nationality: Belarusian
- Born: 17 October 1999 (age 26)

Sport
- Sport: Speed skating
Medal record
Women's speed skating
Representing Belarus
European Championships
Silver medal – second place	2022 Heerenveen	Team sprint

Hanna Nifantava (born 17 October 1999) is a Belarusian speed skater. She competed at the 2022 Winter Olympics, in Women's 500 metres.

She competed at the 2016 Winter Youth Olympics, 2021 European Speed Skating Championships, and 2021 World Single Distances Speed Skating Championships.
