= 2026 European Speed Skating Championships – Women's 500 metres =

Women's 500 metres at the 2026 European Speed Skating Championships
- Venue: Ice Arena
- Location: Tomaszów Mazowiecki, Poland
- Dates: 10 January
- Competitors: 15 from 9 nations
- Winning time: 37.79

Medalists
gold medal	Kaja Ziomek-Nogal	Poland
silver medal	Andżelika Wójcik	Poland
bronze medal	Isabel Grevelt	Netherlands

The women's 500 metres competition at the 2026 European Speed Skating Championships was held on 10 January 2026.

== Results ==
The race was started at 14:25.

Rank	Pair	Lane	Name	Country	Time	Diff
1st place, gold medalist(s)	8	o	Kaja Ziomek-Nogal	Poland	37.79	
2nd place, silver medalist(s)	8	i	Andżelika Wójcik	Poland	38.27	+0.48
3rd place, bronze medalist(s)	5	o	Isabel Grevelt	Netherlands	38.37	+0.58
4	7	o	Serena Pergher	Italy	38.54	+0.75
5	6	o	Martyna Baran	Poland	38.55	+0.76
6	6	i	Anna Boersma	Netherlands	38.57	+0.78
7	3	o	Sofia Thorup	Denmark	38.63	+0.84
8	5	i	Julie Nistad Samsonsen	Norway	39.17	+1.38
9	4	i	Fran Vanhoutte	Belgium	39.19	+1.40
10	4	o	Maybritt Vigl	Italy	39.46	+1.67
11	3	i	Anna Ostlender	Germany	39.54	+1.75
12	2	i	Hanna Biró	Hungary	40.05	+2.26
13	2	o	Katja Franzen	Germany	40.22	+2.43
14	1	i	Luisa María González	Spain	40.66	+2.87
15	7	i	Angel Daleman	Netherlands	1:12.37	+34.58
