= 2026 European Speed Skating Championships – Women's mass start =

Women's mass start at the 2026 European Speed Skating Championships
- Venue: Ice Arena
- Location: Tomaszów Mazowiecki, Poland
- Dates: 11 January
- Competitors: 17 from 12 nations
- Winning points: 60

Medalists
| gold medal | Sofia Thorup | Denmark |
| silver medal | Francesca Lollobrigida | Italy |
| bronze medal | Fran Vanhoutte | Belgium |

The women's mass start competition at the 2026 European Speed Skating Championships was held on 11 January 2026. Russian-born Sofia Thorup, representing Denmark, won the gold medal.

== Results ==
The race started at 16:30.

| Rank | Name | Country | Laps | Points | Time |
|---|---|---|---|---|---|
| 1st place, gold medalist(s) | Sofia Thorup | Denmark | 16 | 60 | 8:39.72 |
| 2nd place, silver medalist(s) | Francesca Lollobrigida | Italy | 16 | 41 | 8:39.73 |
| 3rd place, bronze medalist(s) | Fran Vanhoutte | Belgium | 16 | 20 | 8:40.02 |
| 4 | Hanna Mazur | Poland | 16 | 10 | 8:40.18 |
| 5 | Kim Talsma | Netherlands | 16 | 6 | 8:41.34 |
| 6 | Ashley Völker | Germany | 16 | 3 | 8:41.81 |
| 7 | Aurora Grinden Løvås | Norway | 16 | 3 | 8:49.12 |
| 8 | Lucie Korvasová | Czech Republic | 16 | 3 | 9:02.14 |
| 9 | Natalia Jabrzyk | Poland | 16 | 3 | 9:14.44 |
| 10 | Gemma Cooper | Great Britain | 16 | 3 | 9:16.64 |
| 11 | Anna Molnar | Austria | 16 | 2 | 8:52.41 |
| 12 | Abigél Mercs | Hungary | 16 | 2 | 8:59.17 |
| 13 | Zuzana Kuršová | Czech Republic | 16 | 1 | 8:57.97 |
| 14 | Julia Nizan | France | 16 | 0 | 8:41.96 |
| 15 | Emily Tormen | Italy | 16 | 0 | 8:42.00 |
| 16 | Sanne in 't Hof | Netherlands | 16 | 0 | 8:46.52 |
| 17 | Melissa Schaefer | Germany | 16 | 0 | 8:59.55 |
