= 2026 World Sprint Speed Skating Championships – Women =

Women at the 2026 World Sprint Speed Skating Championships
- Venue: Thialf
- Location: Heerenveen, Netherlands
- Dates: 5–6 March
- Competitors: 27 from 15 nations
- Winning points: 146.670

Medalists
gold medal	Femke Kok	Netherlands
silver medal	Suzanne Schulting	Netherlands
bronze medal	Marrit Fledderus	Netherlands

The Women competition at the 2026 World Sprint Speed Skating Championships was held on 5 and 6 March 2026.

== Background ==
Outgoing 2024 champion Miho Takagi does not defend her title and 2026 Olympic gold medalist Jutta Leerdam cancelled for the event. Olympic gold medalists Femke Kok and Erin Jackson registered for the event.

== Results ==
=== 500 m ===
The race was started on 5 March at 19:00.

Rank	Pair	Lane	Name	Country	Time	Diff
1	12	O	Femke Kok	Netherlands	36.67; TR	
2	9	I	Suzanne Schulting	Netherlands	37.30	+0.63
3	12	I	Kaja Ziomek-Nogal	Poland	37.41	+0.74
4	14	O	Marrit Fledderus	Netherlands	37.50	+0.83
5	14	I	Lee Na-hyun	South Korea	37.82	+1.15
6	11	I	Béatrice Lamarche	Canada	37.91	+1.24
7	13	I	Erin Jackson	United States	38.02	+1.35
8	10	O	Martyna Baran	Poland	38.03	+1.36
9	11	O	Tian Ruining	China	38.07	+1.40
10	10	I	Kim Min-sun	South Korea	38.15	+1.48
11	7	I	Julie Nistad Samsonsen	Norway	38.37	+1.70
11	9	O	Rio Yamada	Japan	38.37	+1.70
13	4	O	Yu Shihui	China	38.58	+1.91
14	5	I	Anna Kubo	Japan	38.69	+2.02
15	13	O	Chen Ying-chu	Chinese Taipei	38.71	+2.04
16	8	O	Fran Vanhoutte	Belgium	38.76	+2.09
17	7	O	Sofia Thorup	Denmark	38.78	+2.11
18	4	I	Ellia Smeding	Great Britain	38.81	+2.14
19	6	I	Anna Ostlender	Germany	38.88	+2.21
20	3	I	Maybritt Vigl	Italy	38.92	+2.25
21	5	O	Arina Ilyachshenko	Kazakhstan	38.98	+2.31
22	8	I	Karolina Bosiek	Poland	39.11	+2.44
23	6	O	Sarah Warren	United States	39.28	+2.61
24	1	I	Sumire Kikuchi	Japan	39.34	+2.67
25	2	O	Isabelle van Elst	Belgium	39.68	+3.01
26	2	I	Katja Franzen	Germany	39.85	+3.18
27	3	O	Maddison Pearman	Canada	40.04	+3.37

=== 1000 m ===
The race was started on 5 March at 20:28.

Rank	Pair	Lane	Name	Country	Time	Diff
1	12	I	Femke Kok	Netherlands	1:13.10	
2	14	I	Suzanne Schulting	Netherlands	1:14.19	+1.09
3	12	O	Béatrice Lamarche	Canada	1:14.75	+1.65
4	13	O	Marrit Fledderus	Netherlands	1:15.16	+2.06
5	3	O	Kaja Ziomek-Nogal	Poland	1:15.59	+2.49
6	9	I	Kim Min-sun	South Korea	1:15.60	+2.50
7	9	O	Lee Na-hyun	South Korea	1:16.10	+3.00
8	14	O	Rio Yamada	Japan	1:16.12	+3.02
9	11	I	Ellia Smeding	Great Britain	1:16.51	+3.41
10	7	I	Anna Ostlender	Germany	1:16.78	+3.68
11	11	O	Isabelle van Elst	Belgium	1:16.94	+3.84
12	10	I	Karolina Bosiek	Poland	1:17.08	+3.98
13	3	I	Anna Kubo	Japan	1:17.18	+4.08
14	8	I	Fran Vanhoutte	Belgium	1:17.27	+4.17
15	3	O	Arina Ilyachshenko	Kazakhstan	1:17.36	+4.26
16	10	O	Sofia Thorup	Denmark	1:17.45	+4.35
17	5	O	Maybritt Vigl	Italy	1:17.66	+4.56
18	4	I	Julie Nistad Samsonsen	Norway	1:17.69	+4.59
19	6	O	Tian Ruining	China	1:17.96	+4.86
20	8	O	Sumire Kikuchi	Japan	1:18.08	+4.98
21	2	I	Martyna Baran	Poland	1:18.53	+5.43
21	13	I	Erin Jackson	United States	1:18.53	+5.43
23	7	O	Maddison Pearman	Canada	1:18.96	+5.86
24	6	I	Sarah Warren	United States	1:19.19	+6.09
25	1	I	Katja Franzen	Germany	1:20.56	+7.46
26	5	I	Chen Ying-chu	Chinese Taipei	1:20.60	+7.50
27	2	O	Yu Shihui	China	1:21.69	+8.59

=== 500 m ===
The race was started on 6 March at 19:00.

Rank	Pair	Lane	Name	Country	Time	Diff
1	13	I	Femke Kok	Netherlands	36.76	
2	13	O	Suzanne Schulting	Netherlands	37.48	+0.72
3	12	O	Kaja Ziomek-Nogal	Poland	37.59	+0.83
4	12	I	Marrit Fledderus	Netherlands	37.69	+0.93
5	11	O	Béatrice Lamarche	Canada	37.86	+1.10
6	10	O	Lee Na-hyun	South Korea	38.00	+1.24
7	9	I	Martyna Baran	Poland	38.04	+1.28
8	7	O	Julie Nistad Samsonsen	Norway	38.05	+1.29
9	9	O	Kim Min-sun	South Korea	38.19	+1.43
10	11	I	Rio Yamada	Japan	38.25	+1.49
11	10	I	Tian Ruining	China	38.35	+1.59
12	3	I	Chen Ying-chu	Chinese Taipei	38.44	+1.68
13	7	I	Sofia Thorup	Denmark	38.47	+1.71
14	2	I	Yu Shihui	China	38.64	+1.88
15	5	O	Anna Kubo	Japan	38.89	+2.13
15	6	I	Arina Ilyachshenko	Kazakhstan	38.89	+2.13
17	6	O	Anna Ostlender	Germany	38.95	+2.19
18	3	O	Sumire Kikuchi	Japan	38.97; PB	+2.21
19	8	I	Fran Vanhoutte	Belgium	39.18	+2.42
20	5	I	Isabelle van Elst	Belgium	39.29	+2.53
21	4	I	Sarah Warren	United States	39.40	+2.64
22	4	O	Karolina Bosiek	Poland	39.64	+2.88
23	2	O	Katja Franzen	Germany	40.04	+3.28
24	1	I	Maddison Pearman	Canada	40.33	+3.57
	8	O	Ellia Smeding	Great Britain	Disqualified	

=== 1000 m ===
The race was started on 6 March at 20:25.

Rank	Pair	Lane	Name	Country	Time	Diff
1	12	O	Femke Kok	Netherlands	1:13.38	
2	11	O	Suzanne Schulting	Netherlands	1:14.12	+0.74
3	12	I	Marrit Fledderus	Netherlands	1:15.07	+1.69
4	10	I	Béatrice Lamarche	Canada	1:15.10	+1.72
5	8	I	Rio Yamada	Japan	1:15.19	+1.81
6	11	I	Kaja Ziomek-Nogal	Poland	1:15.53	+2.15
7	6	I	Sofia Thorup	Denmark	1:15.92	+2.54
8	9	I	Lee Na-hyun	South Korea	1:16.14	+2.76
9	10	O	Kim Min-sun	South Korea	1:16.55	+3.17
10	7	O	Anna Kubo	Japan	1:17.09	+3.71
11	3	I	Isabelle van Elst	Belgium	1:17.28	+3.90
12	5	I	Arina Ilyachshenko	Kazakhstan	1:17.57	+4.19
13	5	O	Fran Vanhoutte	Belgium	1:17.80	+4.42
14	6	O	Anna Ostlender	Germany	1:17.84	+4.46
15	7	I	Tian Ruining	China	1:17.89	+4.51
16	4	I	Sumire Kikuchi	Japan	1:17.90	+4.52
17	9	O	Julie Nistad Samsonsen	Norway	1:18.46	+5.08
18	8	O	Martyna Baran	Poland	1:18.59	+5.21
19	3	O	Sarah Warren	United States	1:19.71	+6.33
20	2	I	Yu Shihui	China	1:19.78	+6.40
21	2	O	Katja Franzen	Germany	1:19.86	+6.48
22	4	O	Chen Ying-chu	Chinese Taipei	1:20.13	+6.75
23	1	I	Maddison Pearman	Canada	1:20.62	+7.24

=== Overall standings ===
After all events.

Rank	Name	Country	500m	1000m	500m	1000m	Points	Diff
1st place, gold medalist(s)	Femke Kok	Netherlands	36.67	1:13.10	36.76	1:13.38	146.670	
2nd place, silver medalist(s)	Suzanne Schulting	Netherlands	37.30	1:14.19	37.48	1:14.12	148.935	+4.53
3rd place, bronze medalist(s)	Marrit Fledderus	Netherlands	37.50	1:15.16	37.69	1:15.07	150.305	+7.27
4	Kaja Ziomek-Nogal	Poland	37.41	1:15.59	37.59	1:15.53	150.560	+7.78
5	Béatrice Lamarche	Canada	37.91	1:14.75	37.86	1:15.10	150.695	+8.05
6	Lee Na-hyun	South Korea	37.82	1:16.10	38.00	1:16.14	151.940	+10.54
7	Rio Yamada	Japan	38.37	1:16.12	38.25	1:15.19	152.275	+11.21
8	Kim Min-sun	South Korea	38.15	1:15.60	38.19	1:16.55	152.415	+11.49
9	Sofia Thorup	Denmark	38.78	1:17.45	38.47	1:15.92	153.935	+14.53
10	Tian Ruining	China	38.07	1:17.96	38.35	1:17.89	154.345	+15.35
11	Julie Nistad Samsonsen	Norway	38.37	1:17.69	38.05	1:18.46	154.495	+15.65
12	Martyna Baran	Poland	38.03	1:18.53	38.04	1:18.59	154.630	+15.92
13	Anna Kubo	Japan	38.69	1:17.18	38.89	1:17.09	154.715	+16.09
14	Anna Ostlender	Germany	38.88	1:16.78	38.95	1:17.84	155.140	+16.94
15	Arina Ilyachshenko	Kazakhstan	38.98	1:17.36	38.89	1:17.57	155.335	+17.33
16	Fran Vanhoutte	Belgium	38.76	1:17.27	39.18	1:17.80	155.475	+17.61
17	Isabelle van Elst	Belgium	39.68	1:16.94	39.29	1:17.28	156.080	+18.82
18	Sumire Kikuchi	Japan	39.34	1:18.08	38.97	1:17.90	156.300	+19.26
19	Chen Ying-chu	Chinese Taipei	38.71	1:20.60	38.44	1:20.13	157.515	+21.69
20	Yu Shihui	China	38.58	1:21.69	38.64	1:19.78	157.955	+22.57
21	Sarah Warren	United States	39.28	1:19.19	39.40	1:19.71	158.130	+22.92
22	Katja Franzen	Germany	39.85	1:20.56	40.04	1:19.86	160.100	+26.86
23	Maddison Pearman	Canada	40.04	1:18.96	40.33	1:20.62	160.160	+26.98
	Karolina Bosiek	Poland	39.11	1:17.08	39.64	DNS	117.290	—
	Ellia Smeding	Great Britain	38.81	1:16.51	DSQ	DNS	77.065	—
	Erin Jackson	United States	38.02	1:18.53	Did not start		77.285	—
	Maybritt Vigl	Italy	38.92	1:17.66	Did not start		77.750	—
