= 2026 European Speed Skating Championships – Women's 1000 metres =

Women's 1000 metres at the 2026 European Speed Skating Championships
- Venue: Ice Arena
- Location: Tomaszów Mazowiecki, Poland
- Dates: 11 January
- Competitors: 15 from 8 nations
- Winning time: 1:16.06

Medalists
| gold medal | Nikola Zdráhalova | Czech Republic |
| silver medal | Chloé Hoogendoorn | Netherlands |
| bronze medal | Isabel Grevelt | Netherlands |

The women's 1000 metres competition at the 2026 European Speed Skating Championships was held on 11 January 2024. Nikola Zdrahalova from the Czech Republic won her maiden European title.

== Results ==
The race started at 15:05.

| Rank | Pair | Lane | Name | Country | Time | Diff |
|---|---|---|---|---|---|---|
| 1st place, gold medalist(s) | 8 | o | Nikola Zdráhalova | Czech Republic | 1:16.06 | |
| 2nd place, silver medalist(s) | 5 | o | Chloé Hoogendoorn | Netherlands | 1:16.34 | +0.28 |
| 3rd place, bronze medalist(s) | 1 | i | Isabel Grevelt | Netherlands | 1:16.37 | +0.31 |
| 4 | 4 | o | Naomi Verkerk | Netherlands | 1:16.41 | +0.35 |
| 5 | 6 | i | Isabelle van Elst | Belgium | 1:16.84 | +0.78 |
| 6 | 7 | o | Sofia Thorup | Denmark | 1:16.99 | +0.93 |
| 7 | 7 | i | Natalia Czerwonka | Poland | 1:17.46 | +1.40 |
| 8 | 6 | o | Karolina Bosiek | Poland | 1:17.96 | +1.90 |
| 9 | 5 | i | Anna Ostlender | Germany | 1:18.21 | +2.15 |
| 10 | 3 | o | Julie Nistad Samsonsen | Norway | 1:18.60 | +2.54 |
| 11 | 8 | i | Iga Wojtasik | Poland | 1:18.78 | +2.72 |
| 12 | 3 | i | Maybritt Vigl | Italy | 1:19.35 | +3.29 |
| 13 | 2 | o | Josephine Helmerl | Germany | 1:20.07 | +4.01 |
| 14 | 2 | i | Katja Franzen | Germany | 1:20.32 | +4.26 |
| 15 | 4 | i | Serena Pergher | Italy | 1:20.61 | +4.55 |
