= 2026 European Speed Skating Championships – Women's team pursuit =

Women's team pursuit at the 2026 European Speed Skating Championships
- Venue: Ice Arena
- Location: Tomaszów Mazowiecki, Poland
- Dates: 11 January
- Competitors: 12 from 4 nations
- Teams: 4
- Winning time: 3:01.35

Medalists
gold medal	Sanne in 't Hof; Evelien Vijn; Kim Talsma	Netherlands
silver medal	Fran Vanhoutte; Isabelle van Elst; Sandrine Tas	Belgium
bronze medal	Zofia Braun; Natalia Jabrzyk; Magdalena Czyszczoń	Poland

The women's team pursuit competition at the 2026 European Speed Skating Championships was held on 11 January 2026. Team Netherlands won its only gold medal of these championships.

== Results ==
The race was started at 13:45.

Rank	Pair	Lane	Country	Time	Diff
1st place, gold medalist(s)	2	s	Netherlands; Sanne in 't Hof; Evelien Vijn; Kim Talsma	3:01.35	
2nd place, silver medalist(s)	2	c	Belgium; Fran Vanhoutte; Isabelle van Elst; Sandrine Tas	3:03.97	+2.62
3rd place, bronze medalist(s)	1	c	Poland; Zofia Braun; Natalia Jabrzyk; Magdalena Czyszczoń	3:07.72	+6.37
4	1	s	Germany; Ashley Völker; Melissa Schaefer; Marlen Ehseluns	3:09.47	+8.12
