= 2026 European Speed Skating Championships – Women's 1500 metres =

Women's 1500 metres at the 2026 European Speed Skating Championships
- Venue: Ice Arena
- Location: Tomaszów Mazowiecki, Poland
- Dates: 10 January
- Competitors: 16 from 8 nations
- Winning time: 1:56.24

Medalists
| gold medal | Ragne Wiklund | Norway |
| silver medal | Nikola Zdráhalová | Czech Republic |
| bronze medal | Chloé Hoogendoorn | Netherlands |

The women's 1500 metres competition at the 2026 European Speed Skating Championships was held on 10 January 2026. Ragne Wiklund from Norway won her second gold medal of the tournament.

== Results ==
The race was started at 16:21.

| Rank | Pair | Lane | Name | Country | Time | Diff |
|---|---|---|---|---|---|---|
| 1st place, gold medalist(s) | 6 | i | Ragne Wiklund | Norway | 1:56.24 | |
| 2nd place, silver medalist(s) | 6 | o | Nikola Zdráhalová | Czech Republic | 1:56.53 | +0.29 |
| 3rd place, bronze medalist(s) | 2 | i | Chloé Hoogendoorn | Netherlands | 1:57.64 | +1.40 |
| 4 | 5 | i | Meike Veen | Netherlands | 1:57.84 | +1.60 |
| 5 | 7 | o | Natalia Czerwonka | Poland | 1:58.49 | +2.25 |
| 6 | 2 | o | Isabel Grevelt | Netherlands | 1:59.20 | +2.96 |
| 7 | 7 | i | Francesca Lollobrigida | Italy | 1:59.63 | +3.39 |
| 8 | 3 | i | Aurora Grinden Løvås | Norway | 2:00.27 | +4.03 |
| 9 | 4 | i | Natalia Jabrzyk | Poland | 2:00.93 | +4.69 |
| 10 | 4 | o | Emily Tormen | Italy | 2:00.96 | +4.72 |
| 11 | 8 | o | Zofia Braun | Poland | 2:01.15 | +4.91 |
| 12 | 5 | o | Isabel Kraus | Germany | 2:02.91 | +6.67 |
| 13 | 1 | o | Marlen Ehseluns | Germany | 2:05.38 | +9.14 |
| 14 | 1 | i | Lucie Korvasová | Czech Republic | 2:07.48 | +11.24 |
| 15 | 3 | o | Abigél Mercs | Hungary | 2:09.56 | +13.32 |
| 16 | 8 | i | Isabelle van Elst | Belgium | Did not finish | |
