= 2026 European Speed Skating Championships – Women's 3000 metres =

Women's 3000 metres at the 2026 European Speed Skating Championships
- Venue: Ice Arena
- Location: Tomaszów Mazowiecki, Poland
- Dates: 9 January
- Competitors: 16 from 9 nations
- Winning time: 4:00.54

Medalists
gold medal	Ragne Wiklund	Norway
silver medal	Sandrine Tas	Belgium
bronze medal	Sanne in 't Hof	Netherlands

The women's 3000 metres competition at the 2026 European Speed Skating Championships took place on 9 January 2026. Ragne Wiklund won the race in a track record and became the first female Norwegian European Champion in speed skating ever.

== Results ==
The race was started at 20:16.

Rank	Pair	Lane	Name	Country	Time	Diff
1st place, gold medalist(s)	7	i	Ragne Wiklund	Norway	4:00.54; TR	
2nd place, silver medalist(s)	7	o	Sandrine Tas	Belgium	4:05.26	+4.72
3rd place, bronze medalist(s)	6	o	Sanne in 't Hof	Netherlands	4:05.91	+5.37
4	8	o	Martina Sáblíková	Czech Republic	4:08.07	+7.53
5	8	i	Francesca Lollobrigida	Italy	4:08.80	+8.26
6	5	i	Aurora Grinden Løvås	Norway	4:11.07	+10.53
7	2	i	Evelien Vijn	Netherlands	4:12.83	+12.29
8	1	i	Gioya Lancee	Netherlands	4:13.29	+12.75
9	2	o	Ashley Völker	Germany	4:15.30	+14.76
10	1	o	Melissa Schaefer	Germany	4:15.55	+15.01
11	6	i	Linda Rossi	Italy	4:16.08	+15.54
12	5	o	Julia Nizan	France	4:18.60	+18.06
13	3	o	Zofia Braun	Poland	4:19.57	+19.03
14	4	o	Marlen Ehseluns	Germany	4:19.80	+19.26
15	3	i	Lucie Korvasová	Czech Republic	4:22.38	+21.84
16	4	i	Anna Molnar	Austria	4:23.35	+22.81
