= 2026 European Speed Skating Championships – Men's 1000 metres =

Men's 1000 metres at the 2026 European Speed Skating Championships
- Venue: Ice Arena
- Location: Tomaszów Mazowiecki, Poland
- Dates: 9 January
- Competitors: 20 from 12 nations
- Winning time: 1:08.55

Medalists
gold medal	Damian Żurek	Poland
silver medal	Tim Prins	Netherlands
bronze medal	Marten Liiv	Estonia

The men's 1000 metres competition at the 2026 European Speed Skating Championships was held on 9 January 2026.

== Results ==
The race was started at 21:16.

Rank	Pair	Lane	Name	Country	Time	Diff
1st place, gold medalist(s)	9	i	Damian Żurek	Poland	1:08.55	
2nd place, silver medalist(s)	10	i	Tim Prins	Netherlands	1:09.35	+0.80
3rd place, bronze medalist(s)	8	o	Marten Liiv	Estonia	1:09.61	+1.06
4	7	i	Merijn Scheperkamp	Netherlands	1:09.66	+1.11
5	10	o	Piotr Michalski	Poland	1:09.79	+1.24
6	6	i	Marek Kania	Poland	1:10.06	+1.51
7	6	o	Daniele Di Stefano	Italy	1:10.11	+1.56
8	9	o	Moritz Klein	Germany	1:10.25	+1.70
9	2	i	Stefan Emele	Germany	1:10.33	+1.78
10	8	i	Mathias Vosté	Belgium	1:10.51	+1.96
11	5	i	Henrik Fagerli Rukke	Norway	1:10.51	+1.96
12	7	o	Kai in 't Veld	Greece	1:10.69	+2.14
13	1	o	Kayo Vos	Netherlands	1:10.70	+2.15
13	4	o	Francesco Betti	Italy	1:10.70	+2.15
15	4	i	David Bosa	Italy	1:10.85	+2.30
16	5	o	Nil Llop	Spain	1:10.87	+2.32
17	2	o	Valentin Thiebault	France	1:11.06	+2.51
18	3	o	Botond Bejczi	Hungary	1:12.51	+3.96
19	1	i	Tomy Nguyen	Germany	1:13.28	+4.73
20	3	i	Ignaz Gschwentner	Austria	1:13.62	+5.07
