= 2026 European Speed Skating Championships – Men's 1500 metres =

Men's 1500 metres at the 2026 European Speed Skating Championships
- Venue: Ice Arena
- Location: Tomaszów Mazowiecki, Poland
- Dates: 11 January
- Competitors: 20 from 11 nations
- Winning time: 1:46.08

Medalists
gold medal	Peder Kongshaug	Norway
silver medal	Vladimir Semirunniy	Poland
bronze medal	Tim Prins	Netherlands

The men's 1500 metres competition at the 2026 European Speed Skating Championships was held on 11 January 2026. Peder Kongshaug from Norway won his third consecutive European title at this distance.

== Results ==
The race started at 14:16.

Rank	Pair	Lane	Name	Country	Time	Diff
1st place, gold medalist(s)	10	o	Peder Kongshaug	Norway	1:46.08	
2nd place, silver medalist(s)	5	i	Vladimir Semirunnyi	Poland	1:46.50	+0.42
3rd place, bronze medalist(s)	9	o	Tim Prins	Netherlands	1:46.61	+0.53
4	9	i	Gabriel Odor	Austria	1:46.82	+0.74
5	4	o	Louis Hollaar	Netherlands	1:47.09	+1.01
6	7	o	Valentin Thiebault	France	1:47.33	+1.25
7	6	o	Alexander Farthofer	Austria	1:47.35	+1.27
8	8	i	Daniele Di Stefano	Italy	1:47.51	+1.43
9	7	i	Finn Elias Haneberg	Norway	1:47.59	+1.51
10	10	i	Wesly Dijs	Netherlands	1:47.69	+1.61
11	8	o	Didrik Eng Strand	Norway	1:47.71	+1.63
12	3	i	Stefan Emele	Germany	1:47.90	+1.82
13	5	o	Mathias Vosté	Belgium	1:48.58	+2.50
14	1	i	Francesco Betti	Italy	1:48.69	+2.61
15	6	i	Szymon Wojtakowski	Poland	1:49.25	+3.17
16	2	o	Kai in 't Veld	Greece	1:49.32	+3.24
17	4	i	Tom Rudolph	Germany	1:49.85	+3.77
18	1	o	Luca Matteo Stibenz	Germany	1:50.51	+4.43
19	3	o	Tadeáš Procházka	Czech Republic	1:54.02	+7.94
	2	i	Bálint Bödei	Hungary	Disqualified	
