= List of Italian records in speed skating =

The following are the national records in speed skating in Italy maintained by the Federazione Italiana Sport del Ghiaccio (FISG).

== Men ==
Event	Record	Athlete	Date	Meet	Place	Ref
500 meters	34.45	David Bosa	10 December 2021	World Cup	Calgary, Canada	
500 meters × 2	70.16	Ermanno Ioriatti	13 March 2011	World Single Distance Championships	Inzell, Germany	
1000 meters	1:07.06	David Bosa	26 January 2024	World Cup	Salt Lake City, United States	
1500 meters	1:42.74	Daniele Di Stefano	15 November 2025	World Cup	Salt Lake City, United States	
3000 meters	3:35.47	Davide Ghiotto	6 November 2025	Beehive Burn	Salt Lake City, United States	
5000 meters	6:04.23	Davide Ghiotto	28 January 2024	World Cup	Salt Lake City, United States	
10000 meters	12:25.69 WR	Davide Ghiotto	25 January 2025	World Cup	Calgary, Canada	
Team sprint (3 laps)	1:20.42	Francesco Betti; Alessio Trentini; David Bosa	20 November 2022	World Cup	Heerenveen, Netherlands	
Team pursuit (8 laps)	3:35.00	Andrea Giovannini; Davide Ghiotto; Michele Malfatti	16 February 2024	World Single Distances Championships	Calgary, Canada	
Sprint combination	138.300 pts	David Bosa	7–8 March 2024	World Sprint Championships	Inzell, Germany	
Small combination	154.309 pts	Andrea Giovannini	22–24 February 2013	World Junior Championships	Collalbo, Italy	
Big combination	147.216 pts	Enrico Fabris	18–19 March 2006	World Allround Championships	Calgary, Canada	

== Women ==
Event	Record	Athlete	Date	Meet	Place	Ref
500 meters	37.29	Serena Pergher	15 November 2025	World Cup	Salt Lake City, United States	
500 meters × 2	76.44	Chiara Simionato	10 March 2007	World Single Distance Championships	Salt Lake City, United States	
1000 meters	1:13.47	Chiara Simionato	11 November 2007	World Cup	Salt Lake City, United States	
1500 meters	1:52.23	Francesca Lollobrigida	5 December 2021	World Cup	Salt Lake City, United States	
3000 meters	3:54.28	Francesca Lollobrigida	7 February 2026	Olympic Games	Milan, Italy	
5000 meters	6:46.17	Francesca Lollobrigida	12 February 2026	Olympic Games	Milan, Italy	
10000 meters						
Team sprint (3 laps)	1:28.18	Yvonne Daldossi; Noemi Bonazza; Francesca Bettrone	7 February 2019	World Single Distance Championships	Inzell, Germany	
Team pursuit (6 laps)	2:58.90	Francesca Lollobrigida; Veronica Luciani; Laura Lorenzato	27 January 2024	World Cup	Salt Lake City, United States	
Sprint combination	150.670 pts	Chiara Simionato	22–23 January 2005	World Sprint Championships	Salt Lake City, United States	
Mini combination	163.979 pts	Chiara Simionato	15–16 November 2003	World Cup	Erfurt, Germany	
Small combination	159.025 pts	Francesca Lollobrigida	9–10 March 2024	World Allround Championships	Inzell, Germany	

== Mixed ==
Event	Record	Athlete	Date	Meet	Place	Ref
Relay	2:58.06	Riccardo Lorello; Serena Pergher	12 November 2023	World Cup	Obihiro, Japan	
