= List of British records in speed skating =

The following are the national records in speed skating in Great Britain maintained by the National Ice Skating Association of Great Britain & N.I. (NISA).

== Men ==
Event	Record	Athlete	Date	Meet	Place	Ref
500 meters	34.82	Cornelius Kersten	3 December 2021	World Cup	Salt Lake City, United States	
500 meters × 2						
1000 meters	1:07.33	Cornelius Kersten	12 December 2021	World Cup	Calgary, Canada	
1500 meters	1:44.29	Cornelius Kersten	11 December 2021	World Cup	Calgary, Canada	
3000 meters	3:52.35	Cornelius Kersten	22 December 2017	Time Trials	Calgary, Canada	
5000 meters	6:51.18	Philip Brojaka	22 March 2009	American Cup Final	Salt Lake City, United States	
10000 meters	14:59.53	Julien Green	21 February 1988	Olympic Games	Calgary, Canada	
Team pursuit (8 laps)						
Sprint combination	142.625 pts	Cornelius Kersten	6–7 January 2023	European Championships	Hamar, Norway	
Small combination	172.037 pts	Robert Mitchell	10–11 March 2020	Masters International Thialf Records Races	Heerenveen, Netherlands	
Big combination	167.080 pts	Matthew Lindsay	12–14 March 2010	American Cup Final	Salt Lake City, United States	

== Women ==
Event	Record	Athlete	Date	Meet	Place	Ref
500 meters	38.06	Ellia Smeding	8 March 2024	World Sprint Championships	Inzell, Germany	
500 meters × 2						
1000 meters	1:14.47	Ellia Smeding	28 January 2024	World Cup	Salt Lake City, United States	
1500 meters	1:55.32	Ellia Smeding	22 November 2025	World Cup	Calgary, Canada	
3000 meters	4:13.27	Gemma Cooper	14 November 2025	World Cup	Salt Lake City, United States	
5000 meters	7:36.82	Gemma Cooper	5 December 2025	World Cup	Heerenveen, Netherlands	
10000 meters	22:06.60	Clare Upton	28 December 2017	UK Long Track Championships	Leeuwarden, Netherlands	
Team pursuit (6 laps)						
Sprint combination	151.840 pts	Ellia Smeding	7–8 March 2024	World Sprint Championships	Inzell, Germany	
Mini combination	189.356 pts	Ellia Smeding	30–31 January 2015	Viking Race	Heerenveen, Netherlands	
Small combination						
