= 2025 World Single Distances Speed Skating Championships – Men's 1500 metres =

Men's 1500 metres at the 2025 World Single Distances Speed Skating Championships
- Venue: Vikingskipet
- Location: Hamar, Norway
- Dates: 16 March
- Competitors: 24 from 13 nations
- Winning time: 1:44.64

Medalists
gold medal	Peder Kongshaug	Norway
silver medal	Jordan Stolz	United States
bronze medal	Connor Howe	Canada

The Men's 1500 metres competition at the 2025 World Single Distances Speed Skating Championships took place on 16 March 2025.

== Qualification ==
A total of 24 entry quotas were available for the event, with a maximum of three per country. The entry quotas were assigned to countries following a Special Qualification Ranking List based on rankings and performances of skaters during the 2024–25 ISU Speed Skating World Cup.

== Records ==
Prior to this competition, the existing world and track records were as follows.

	Time	Athlete	Date
World Record	1:40.17	Kjeld Nuis (NED)	10 March 2019
Track Record	1:44.27	Shani Davis (USA)	21 November 2009

== Results ==
The race was started at 12:00.

Rank	Pair	Lane	Name	Country	Time	Diff
1st place, gold medalist(s)	11	o	Peder Kongshaug	Norway	1:44.64	
2nd place, silver medalist(s)	12	o	Jordan Stolz	United States	1:44.71	+0.07
3rd place, bronze medalist(s)	8	o	Connor Howe	Canada	1:44.78	+0.14
4	11	i	Ning Zhongyan	China	1:44.87	+0.23
5	8	i	Tim Prins	Netherlands	1:45.24	+0.60
6	12	i	Kjeld Nuis	Netherlands	1:45.36	+0.72
7	6	i	Didrik Eng Strand	Norway	1:45.67	+1.03
8	10	o	Sander Eitrem	Norway	1:45.75	+1.11
9	9	o	Wesly Dijs	Netherlands	1:45.79	+1.15
10	7	i	Daniele Di Stefano	Italy	1:45.87	+1.23
11	4	i	Hendrik Dombek	Germany	1:45.95	+1.31
12	10	i	Kim Min-seok	Hungary	1:46.27	+1.63
13	7	o	Stefan Emele	Germany	1:46.47	+1.83
14	6	o	Kazuya Yamada	Japan	1:46.86	+2.22
15	3	o	Motonaga Arito	Japan	1:47.14	+2.50
16	5	o	David La Rue	Canada	1:47.38	+2.74
17	4	o	Moritz Klein	Germany	1:47.42	+2.78
18	2	i	Gabriel Odor	Austria	1:48.08	+3.44
19	5	i	Emery Lehman	United States	1:48.29	+3.65
20	1	o	Chung Jae-won	South Korea	1:48.37	+3.73
21	2	o	Livio Wenger	Switzerland	1:48.58	+3.94
22	3	i	Liu Hanbin	China	1:48.96	+4.32
23	1	i	Indra Médard	Belgium	1:49.00	+4.36
24	9	i	Taiyo Nonomura	Japan	1:49.22	+4.58
