= 2026 European Speed Skating Championships – Women's team sprint =

Women's team sprint at the 2026 European Speed Skating Championships
- Venue: Ice Arena
- Location: Tomaszów Mazowiecki, Poland
- Dates: 9 January
- Competitors: 12 from 4 nations
- Teams: 4
- Winning time: 1:27.07

Medalists
gold medal	Martina Baran; Kaja Ziomek-Nogal; Karolina Bosiek	Poland
silver medal	Fran Vanhoutte; Isabelle van Elst; Sandrine Tas	Belgium
bronze medal	Katja Franzen; Anna Ostlender; Isabel Kraus	Germany

The women's team sprint competition at the 2026 European Speed Skating Championships was held on 9 January 2026.

== Results ==
The race started at 19:30. There were four participating nations.

Rank	Pair	Lane	Country	Time	Diff
1st place, gold medalist(s)	2	c	Poland; Martina Baran; Kaja Ziomek-Nogal; Karolina Bosiek	1:27.07	
2nd place, silver medalist(s)	1	s	Belgium; Fran Vanhoutte; Isabelle van Elst; Sandrine Tas	1:32.65	+5.58
3rd place, bronze medalist(s)	2	s	Germany; Katja Franzen; Anna Ostlender; Isabel Kraus	1:34.52	+7.45
4	1	c	Netherlands; Anna Boersma; Naomi Verkerk; Isabel Grevelt	Did not finish	
