= 2024 World Sprint Speed Skating Championships – Women =

Women at the 2024 World Sprint Speed Skating Championships
- Venue: Max Aicher Arena
- Location: Inzell, Germany
- Dates: 7–8 March
- Competitors: 27 from 15 nations
- Winning points: 147.545

Medalists
| gold medal | Miho Takagi | Japan |
| silver medal | Femke Kok | Netherlands |
| bronze medal | Jutta Leerdam | Netherlands |

The Women competition at the 2024 World Sprint Speed Skating Championships was held on 7 and 8 March 2024.

== Results ==
=== 500 m ===
The race was started on 7 March at 19:00.

| Rank | Pair | Lane | Name | Country | Time | Diff |
|---|---|---|---|---|---|---|
| 1 | 12 | O | Femke Kok | Netherlands | 37.07 TR | |
| 2 | 9 | I | Miho Takagi | Japan | 37.13 | +0.06 |
| 3 | 13 | O | Kim Min-sun | South Korea | 37.36 | +0.29 |
| 4 | 13 | I | Erin Jackson | United States | 37.40 | +0.33 |
| 5 | 14 | O | Jutta Leerdam | Netherlands | 37.41 | +0.34 |
| 6 | 11 | I | Vanessa Herzog | Austria | 37.57 | +0.50 |
| 7 | 12 | I | Tian Ruining | China | 37.78 | +0.71 |
| 8 | 14 | I | Kimi Goetz | United States | 37.98 | +0.91 |
| 9 | 9 | O | Isabel Grevelt | Netherlands | 38.03 | +0.96 |
| 10 | 7 | O | Karolina Bosiek | Poland | 38.15 | +1.08 |
| 11 | 8 | O | Ellia Smeding | Great Britain | 38.19 | +1.12 |
| 12 | 11 | O | Rio Yamada | Japan | 38.22 | +1.15 |
| 13 | 7 | I | Martyna Baran | Poland | 38.29 | +1.22 |
| 14 | 10 | I | Lee Na-hyun | South Korea | 38.32 | +1.25 |
| 15 | 4 | I | Anna Ostlender | Germany | 38.44 | +1.37 |
| 16 | 6 | I | Kim Min-ji | South Korea | 38.52 | +1.45 |
| 17 | 10 | O | Serena Pergher | Italy | 38.57 | +1.50 |
| 18 | 6 | O | Alina Dauranova | Kazakhstan | 38.64 | +1.57 |
| 19 | 3 | O | Iga Wojtasik | Poland | 38.65 | +1.58 |
| 20 | 8 | I | Martine Ripsrud | Norway | 38.69 | +1.62 |
| 21 | 4 | O | Julie Nistad Samsonsen | Norway | 38.79 | +1.72 |
| 22 | 5 | I | Isabelle van Elst | Belgium | 38.89 | +1.82 |
| 23 | 3 | I | Maddison Pearman | Canada | 39.13 | +2.06 |
| 24 | 1 | I | Lea Sophie Scholz | Germany | 39.72 | +2.65 |
| 25 | 2 | O | Kristina Shumekova | Kazakhstan | 39.76 | +2.69 |
| 26 | 2 | I | Inessa Shumekova | Kazakhstan | 40.06 | +2.99 |
| | 5 | O | Sofia Thorup | Denmark | Disqualified | |

=== 1000 m ===
The race was started on 7 March at 20:27.

| Rank | Pair | Lane | Name | Country | Time | Diff |
|---|---|---|---|---|---|---|
| 1 | 12 | I | Miho Takagi | Japan | 1:13.32 TR | |
| 2 | 13 | I | Jutta Leerdam | Netherlands | 1:13.71 | +0.39 |
| 3 | 12 | O | Femke Kok | Netherlands | 1:14.35 | +1.03 |
| 4 | 13 | O | Kimi Goetz | United States | 1:14.46 | +1.14 |
| 5 | 10 | I | Isabel Grevelt | Netherlands | 1:15.02 | +1.70 |
| 6 | 14 | I | Vanessa Herzog | Austria | 1:15.42 | +2.10 |
| 7 | 9 | O | Rio Yamada | Japan | 1:15.49 | +2.17 |
| 8 | 11 | I | Ellia Smeding | Great Britain | 1:15.49 | +2.17 |
| 9 | 11 | O | Erin Jackson | United States | 1:15.72 | +2.40 |
| 10 | 10 | O | Tian Ruining | China | 1:15.82 | +2.50 |
| 11 | 7 | I | Karolina Bosiek | Poland | 1:16.30 | +2.98 |
| 12 | 8 | O | Isabelle van Elst | Belgium | 1:16.57 | +3.25 |
| 13 | 9 | I | Lee Na-hyun | South Korea | 1:16.71 | +3.39 |
| 14 | 7 | O | Alina Dauranova | Kazakhstan | 1:16.82 | +3.50 |
| 15 | 3 | I | Iga Wojtasik | Poland | 1:16.90 | +3.58 |
| 16 | 4 | I | Anna Ostlender | Germany | 1:16.94 | +3.62 |
| 17 | 6 | O | Sofia Thorup | Denmark | 1:17.13 | +3.81 |
| 18 | 14 | O | Kim Min-sun | South Korea | 1:17.35 | +4.03 |
| 19 | 3 | O | Kim Min-ji | South Korea | 1:17.47 | +4.15 |
| 20 | 6 | I | Maddison Pearman | Canada | 1:17.67 | +4.35 |
| 21 | 5 | O | Serena Pergher | Italy | 1:17.95 | +4.63 |
| 22 | 8 | I | Martine Ripsrud | Norway | 1:18.05 | +4.73 |
| 23 | 2 | O | Martyna Baran | Poland | 1:18.08 | +4.76 |
| 24 | 4 | O | Julie Nistad Samsonsen | Norway | 1:18.48 | +5.16 |
| 25 | 2 | I | Kristina Shumekova | Kazakhstan | 1:19.40 | +6.08 |
| 26 | 1 | I | Inessa Shumekova | Kazakhstan | 1:20.32 | +7.00 |
| 27 | 5 | I | Lea Sophie Scholz | Germany | 1:24.27 | +10.95 |

=== 500 m ===
The race was started on 8 March at 18:30.

| Rank | Pair | Lane | Name | Country | Time | Diff |
|---|---|---|---|---|---|---|
| 1 | 13 | I | Femke Kok | Netherlands | 37.07 TR | |
| 2 | 8 | I | Kim Min-sun | South Korea | 37.11 | +0.04 |
| 3 | 11 | O | Erin Jackson | United States | 37.13 | +0.06 |
| 4 | 13 | O | Miho Takagi | Japan | 37.19 | +0.12 |
| 5 | 10 | O | Vanessa Herzog | Austria | 37.48 | +0.41 |
| 6 | 12 | I | Jutta Leerdam | Netherlands | 37.57 | +0.50 |
| 7 | 9 | O | Tian Ruining | China | 37.65 | +0.58 |
| 8 | 12 | O | Kimi Goetz | United States | 37.69 | +0.62 |
| 9 | 8 | O | Lee Na-hyun | South Korea | 37.83 | +0.76 |
| 10 | 11 | I | Isabel Grevelt | Netherlands | 38.05 | +0.98 |
| 11 | 10 | I | Ellia Smeding | Great Britain | 38.06 | +0.99 |
| 12 | 9 | I | Rio Yamada | Japan | 38.09 | +1.02 |
| 13 | 4 | O | Martyna Baran | Poland | 38.12 | +1.05 |
| 14 | 7 | I | Karolina Bosiek | Poland | 38.24 | +1.17 |
| 15 | 3 | O | Martine Ripsrud | Norway | 38.44 | +1.37 |
| 16 | 6 | I | Alina Dauranova | Kazakhstan | 38.55 | +1.48 |
| 17 | 5 | O | Kim Min-ji | South Korea | 38.56 | +1.49 |
| 18 | 4 | I | Serena Pergher | Italy | 38.60 | +1.53 |
| 19 | 7 | O | Anna Ostlender | Germany | 38.61 | +1.54 |
| 20 | 6 | O | Isabelle van Elst | Belgium | 38.86 | +1.79 |
| 21 | 5 | I | Iga Wojtasik | Poland | 38.88 | +1.81 |
| 22 | 2 | O | Maddison Pearman | Canada | 38.95 | +1.88 |
| 23 | 3 | I | Julie Nistad Samsonsen | Norway | 39.10 | +2.03 |
| 24 | 2 | I | Kristina Shumekova | Kazakhstan | 39.51 | +2.44 |
| 25 | 1 | I | Sofia Thorup | Denmark | 39.67 | +2.60 |
| 26 | 1 | O | Inessa Shumekova | Kazakhstan | 39.73 | +2.66 |

=== 1000 m ===
The race was started on 8 March at 19:55.

| Rank | Pair | Lane | Name | Country | Time | Diff |
|---|---|---|---|---|---|---|
| 1 | 12 | O | Jutta Leerdam | Netherlands | 1:12.86 TR | |
| 2 | 13 | O | Miho Takagi | Japan | 1:13.13 | +0.27 |
| 3 | 13 | I | Femke Kok | Netherlands | 1:13.57 | +0.71 |
| 4 | 11 | I | Kimi Goetz | United States | 1:13.91 | +1.05 |
| 5 | 10 | I | Kim Min-sun | South Korea | 1:14.69 | +1.83 |
| 6 | 9 | I | Tian Ruining | China | 1:14.86 | +2.00 |
| 7 | 11 | O | Vanessa Herzog | Austria | 1:14.87 | +2.01 |
| 8 | 8 | I | Rio Yamada | Japan | 1:14.94 | +2.08 |
| 9 | 9 | O | Ellia Smeding | Great Britain | 1:15.69 | +2.83 |
| 10 | 7 | O | Karolina Bosiek | Poland | 1:15.87 | +3.01 |
| 11 | 12 | I | Erin Jackson | United States | 1:16.31 | +3.45 |
| 12 | 8 | O | Lee Na-hyun | South Korea | 1:16.37 | +3.51 |
| 13 | 4 | I | Isabelle van Elst | Belgium | 1:16.60 | +3.74 |
| 14 | 5 | O | Iga Wojtasik | Poland | 1:16.68 | +3.82 |
| 15 | 3 | O | Maddison Pearman | Canada | 1:16.95 | +4.09 |
| 16 | 6 | O | Anna Ostlender | Germany | 1:17.08 | +4.22 |
| 17 | 7 | I | Martyna Baran | Poland | 1:17.29 | +4.43 |
| 18 | 6 | I | Alina Dauranova | Kazakhstan | 1:17.37 | +4.51 |
| 19 | 4 | O | Martine Ripsrud | Norway | 1:17.40 | +4.54 |
| 20 | 5 | I | Kim Min-ji | South Korea | 1:17.73 | +4.87 |
| 21 | 3 | I | Serena Pergher | Italy | 1:17.79 | +4.93 |
| 22 | 2 | O | Kristina Shumekova | Kazakhstan | 1:18.25 | +5.39 |
| 23 | 2 | I | Julie Nistad Samsonsen | Norway | 1:18.29 | +5.43 |
| 24 | 1 | O | Inessa Shumekova | Kazakhstan | 1:19.53 | +6.67 |
| | 10 | O | Isabel Grevelt | Netherlands | Disqualified | |

=== Overall standings ===
After all events.

| Rank | Name | Country | 500m | 1000m | 500m | 1000m | Points | Diff |
|---|---|---|---|---|---|---|---|---|
| 1st place, gold medalist(s) | Miho Takagi | Japan | 37.13 | 1:13.32 | 37.19 | 1:13.13 | 147.545 | |
| 2nd place, silver medalist(s) | Femke Kok | Netherlands | 37.07 | 1:14.35 | 37.07 | 1:13.57 | 148.100 | +1.11 |
| 3rd place, bronze medalist(s) | Jutta Leerdam | Netherlands | 37.41 | 1:13.71 | 37.57 | 1:12.86 | 148.265 | +1.44 |
| 4 | Kimi Goetz | United States | 37.98 | 1:14.46 | 37.69 | 1:13.91 | 149.855 | +4.62 |
| 5 | Vanessa Herzog | Austria | 37.57 | 1:15.42 | 37.48 | 1:14.87 | 150.195 | +5.30 |
| 6 | Kim Min-sun | South Korea | 37.36 | 1:17.35 | 37.11 | 1:14.69 | 150.490 | +5.89 |
| 7 | Erin Jackson | United States | 37.40 | 1:15.72 | 37.13 | 1:16.31 | 150.545 | +6.00 |
| 8 | Tian Ruining | China | 37.78 | 1:15.82 | 37.65 | 1:14.86 | 150.770 | +6.45 |
| 9 | Rio Yamada | Japan | 38.22 | 1:15.49 | 38.09 | 1:14.94 | 151.525 | +7.96 |
| 10 | Ellia Smeding | Great Britain | 38.19 | 1:15.49 | 38.06 | 1:15.69 | 151.840 | +8.59 |
| 11 | Karolina Bosiek | Poland | 38.15 | 1:16.30 | 38.24 | 1:15.87 | 152.475 | +9.86 |
| 12 | Lee Na-hyun | South Korea | 38.32 | 1:16.71 | 37.83 | 1:16.37 | 152.690 | +10.29 |
| 13 | Anna Ostlender | Germany | 38.44 | 1:16.94 | 38.61 | 1:17.08 | 154.060 | +13.03 |
| 14 | Martyna Baran | Poland | 38.29 | 1:18.08 | 38.12 | 1:17.29 | 154.095 | +13.10 |
| 15 | Alina Dauranova | Kazakhstan | 38.64 | 1:16.82 | 38.55 | 1:17.37 | 154.285 | +13.48 |
| 16 | Iga Wojtasik | Poland | 38.65 | 1:16.90 | 38.88 | 1:16.68 | 154.320 | +13.55 |
| 17 | Isabelle van Elst | Belgium | 38.89 | 1:16.57 | 38.86 | 1:16.60 | 154.335 | +13.58 |
| 18 | Kim Min-ji | South Korea | 38.52 | 1:17.47 | 38.56 | 1:17.73 | 154.680 | +14.27 |
| 19 | Martine Ripsrud | Norway | 38.69 | 1:18.05 | 38.44 | 1:17.40 | 154.855 | +14.62 |
| 20 | Serena Pergher | Italy | 38.57 | 1:17.95 | 38.60 | 1:17.79 | 155.040 | +14.99 |
| 21 | Maddison Pearman | Canada | 39.13 | 1:17.67 | 38.95 | 1:16.95 | 155.390 | +15.69 |
| 22 | Julie Nistad Samsonsen | Norway | 38.79 | 1:18.48 | 39.10 | 1:18.29 | 156.275 | +17.46 |
| 23 | Kristina Shumekova | Kazakhstan | 39.76 | 1:19.40 | 39.51 | 1:18.25 | 158.095 | +21.10 |
| 24 | Inessa Shumekova | Kazakhstan | 40.06 | 1:20.32 | 39.73 | 1:19.53 | 159.715 | +24.34 |
| – | Isabel Grevelt | Netherlands | 38.03 | 1:15.02 | 38.05 | DQ | Did not finish | |
| – | Lea Sophie Scholz | Germany | 39.72 | 1:24.27 | Did not start | | Did not finish | |
| – | Sofia Thorup | Denmark | DQ | 1:17.13 | 39.67 | DNS | Did not finish | |
