= Peder Kongshaug =

Norwegian speed skater (born 2001)

Personal information
- Nationality: Norwegian
- Born: 13 August 2001 (age 25) Wimbledon, England
- Height: 1.84 m (6 ft 0 in)
- Weight: 76 kg (168 lb)

Sport
- Country: Norway
- Sport: Speed skating
- Club: Stavanger Sandnes Skøyteklubb
Medal record
Men's speed skating
Representing Norway
Olympic Games
Gold medal – first place	2022 Beijing	Team pursuit
World Single Distance Championships
Gold medal – first place	2025 Hamar	1500 m
Silver medal – second place	2024 Calgary	Team pursuit
Bronze medal – third place	2023 Heerenveen	Team pursuit
Bronze medal – third place	2024 Calgary	1500 m
European Championships
Gold medal – first place	2024 Heerenveen	1500 m
Gold medal – first place	2024 Heerenveen	Team pursuit
Gold medal – first place	2026 Tomaszów Mazowiecki	1500 m
Silver medal – second place	2025 Heerenveen	Allround
Bronze medal – third place	2026 Tomaszów Mazowiecki	Team pursuit

Peder Kongshaug (born 13 August 2001) is a Norwegian speed skater. He won Olympic gold in the team pursuit at the 2022 Winter Olympics and became world champion in the 1500 metres in 2025. Kongshaug is also a two-time European champion in the 1500 metres, winning the title in 2024 and 2026.

== Biography ==
Kongshaug was born in Wimbledon, England. He is the son of Peer Albert Kongshaug, who represented Norway in sailing and placed eighth at the 1988 Flying Dutchman World Championship in Medemblik, Netherlands.

Kongshaug won the 1000 metres at the 2020 World Junior Speed Skating Championships. The following year, he competed at both the European Championships and the World Single Distances Championships. At the 2022 European Speed Skating Championships, he finished seventh in the 1500 metres.

Kongshaug made his Olympic debut at the 2022 Winter Olympics in Beijing. He finished fourth in the 1500 metres before winning gold in the team pursuit alongside Hallgeir Engebråten and Sverre Lunde Pedersen. Norway recorded the fastest time in the quarter-finals before defeating the Netherlands in the semi-final and the Russian Olympic Committee in the final.

Following his Olympic victory, Kongshaug won bronze in the team pursuit at the 2023 World Single Distances Speed Skating Championships. At the 2024 European Speed Skating Championships in Heerenveen, he became European champion in both the 1500 metres and the team pursuit. Later that season, he won silver in the team pursuit and bronze in the 1500 metres at the 2024 World Single Distances Speed Skating Championships in Calgary.

In January 2025, Kongshaug finished second behind Sander Eitrem at the European Allround Championships in Heerenveen, winning the 1500-metre race during the competition. Two months later, he claimed his first individual world title, defeating defending champion Jordan Stolz in the 1500 metres at the 2025 World Single Distances Speed Skating Championships in Hamar.

In 2025, Kongshaug publicly criticised the level of prize money in international speed skating. He argued that it was difficult for skaters outside the Netherlands to make a living from the sport and noted that the US$1,500 prize for winning a World Cup race had remained unchanged since the 1990s. In June 2026, the International Skating Union announced that the total annual prize-money fund for its skating disciplines would increase from €4.7 million to approximately €9.5 million for the following season. Annual travel reimbursements for athletes were also set to increase from €2.1 million to €3.9 million.

Kongshaug won his second European 1500-metre title at the 2026 European Speed Skating Championships in Tomaszów Mazowiecki, where he also earned bronze in the team pursuit. At his second Winter Olympics, held in Milan and Cortina d'Ampezzo, he served as one of Norway's opening-ceremony flagbearers alongside alpine skier Kajsa Vickhoff Lie. He finished sixth in the 1500 metres, 5000 metres and team pursuit. Later that season, he placed fifth overall at the 2026 World Allround Speed Skating Championships in Heerenveen.

== Personal records ==
Personal records
Speed skating
Event	Result	Date	Location	Notes
500 metres	35.45	7 November 2025	Salt Lake City	
1000 metres	1:07.92	26 January 2024	Salt Lake City	
1500 metres	1:41.34	15 November 2025	Salt Lake City	
3000 metres	3:36.74	4 January 2025	Heerenveen	
5000 metres	6:05.89	14 November 2025	Salt Lake City	
10000 metres	13:08.75	8 March 2026	Heerenveen	

He is currently in 7th position in the adelskalender with 145.426 points.
