= Chloé Hoogendoorn =

Dutch allround speed skater (born 2004)

Personal information
- Nationality: Dutch
- Born: 7 March 2004 (age 22) Woubrugge, Netherlands

Sport
- Country: Netherlands
- Sport: Speed skating
- Events: 500 m, 1000 m, 1500 m
- Turned pro: 2021
Medal record
Women's speed skating
Representing the Netherlands
European Championships
Silver medal – second place	2026 Tomaszów Mazowiecki	1000 m
Bronze medal – third place	2026 Tomaszów Mazowiecki	1500 m

Chloé Hoogendoorn (born 7 March 2004) is a Dutch allround speed skater.

== Career ==
At the 2022 World Junior Speed Skating Championships, Hoogendoorn won the gold medal in the team sprint, together with Jildou Hoekstra and Pien Smit. She also won a gold medal in the mass start and team pursuit events as well as a bronze medal in the 1500 m.

For the 2025 European Championships, her podium finish ultimately prevented her from qualifying as third skater, as Femke Kok was designated by the Royal Dutch Skating Federation (KNSB). Together with Wesly Dijs, Hoogendoorn set a world record in the mixed relay long track speed skating with a time of 2:54.05 during a World Cup competition in Calgary on 23 November 2025. With this they won the gold medal. During the 2026 Dutch Olympic qualifying tournament, she skated to a new personal record in the 500, 1000 and 1500 meters.

At the 2026 European Championships, Hoogendoorn won a bronze medal in the 1500 m and a silver medal in the 1000 m.

== Personal life ==
Hoogendoorn's sister, Lieke, also competed as a long track speed skater.
