= 2024 European Speed Skating Championships – Men's 1500 metres =

Men's 1500 metres at the 2024 European Speed Skating Championships
- Venue: Thialf
- Location: Heerenveen, Netherlands
- Dates: 7 January
- Competitors: 20 from 10 nations
- Winning time: 1:44.25

Medalists
gold medal	Peder Kongshaug	Norway
silver medal	Kjeld Nuis	Netherlands
bronze medal	Patrick Roest	Netherlands

The men's 1500 metres competition at the 2024 European Speed Skating Championships was held on 7 January 2024.

== Results ==
The race was started at 14:37.

Rank	Pair	Lane	Name	Country	Time	Diff
1st place, gold medalist(s)	8	i	Peder Kongshaug	Norway	1:44.25	
2nd place, silver medalist(s)	10	o	Kjeld Nuis	Netherlands	1:44.34	+0.09
3rd place, bronze medalist(s)	9	o	Patrick Roest	Netherlands	1:44.40	+0.15
4	10	i	Sander Eitrem	Norway	1:45.29	+1.04
5	9	i	Wesly Dijs	Netherlands	1:45.44	+1.19
6	6	i	Allan Dahl Johansson	Norway	1:46.01	+1.76
7	7	i	Moritz Klein	Germany	1:46.05	+1.80
8	5	o	Bart Swings	Belgium	1:46.12	+1.87
9	7	o	Alessio Trentini	Italy	1:46.23	+1.98
10	6	o	Daniele Di Stefano	Italy	1:46.24	+1.99
11	8	o	Hendrik Dombek	Germany	1:46.46	+2.21
12	2	o	Gabriel Odor	Austria	1:46.54	+2.29
13	4	o	Mathias Vosté	Belgium	1:46.65	+2.40
14	3	o	Mathieu Belloir	France	1:47.01	+2.76
15	5	i	Stefan Emele	Germany	1:47.27	+3.02
16	3	i	Francesco Betti	Italy	1:47.28	+3.03
17	2	i	Livio Wenger	Switzerland	1:47.54	+3.29
18	1	o	Szymon Wojtakowski	Poland	1:48.47	+4.22
19	1	i	Samuli Suomalainen	Finland	1:48.55	+4.30
20	4	i	Marcin Bachanek	Poland	1:49.34	+5.09
