= 2023 World Single Distances Speed Skating Championships – Men's team pursuit =

2023 Mens Speed Skating Championship

Men's team pursuit at the 2023 World Single Distances Speed Skating Championships
- Venue: Thialf
- Location: Heerenveen, Netherlands
- Date: 3 March
- Competitors: 24 from 8 nations
- Teams: 8
- Winning time: 3:38.26

Medalists
| gold medal | Patrick Roest; Beau Snellink; Marcel Bosker | Netherlands |
| silver medal | Connor Howe; Antoine Gélinas-Beaulieu; Hayden Mayeur | Canada |
| bronze medal | Peder Kongshaug; Allan Dahl Johansson; Sverre Lunde Pedersen | Norway |

The Men's team pursuit competition at the 2023 World Single Distances Speed Skating Championships was held on 3 March 2023.

== Results ==
The race was started at 19:30.

| Rank | Pair | Lane | Country | Time | Diff |
|---|---|---|---|---|---|
| 1st place, gold medalist(s) | 4 | c | Netherlands; Patrick Roest; Beau Snellink; Marcel Bosker | 3:38.26 | |
| 2nd place, silver medalist(s) | 3 | c | Canada; Connor Howe; Antoine Gélinas-Beaulieu; Hayden Mayeur | 3:38.43 | +0.17 |
| 3rd place, bronze medalist(s) | 3 | s | Norway; Peder Kongshaug; Allan Dahl Johansson; Sverre Lunde Pedersen | 3:40.93 | +2.67 |
| 4 | 2 | s | Italy; Francesco Betti; Andrea Giovannini; Davide Ghiotto | 3:42.69 | +4.43 |
| 5 | 1 | s | Japan; Seitaro Ichinohe; Riku Tsuchiya; Kazuya Yamada | 3:43.67 | +5.41 |
| 6 | 2 | c | Poland; Marcin Bachanek; Artur Janicki; Szymon Palka | 3:51.35 | +13.09 |
| 7 | 4 | s | United States; Ethan Cepuran; Emery Lehman; Casey Dawson | 3:58.10 | +19.84 |
| | 1 | c | Denmark; Niclas Mastrup; Stefan Due Schmidt; Viktor Hald Thorup | Did not finish | |
