= Serena Pergher =

Italian speed skater (born 2004)

Personal information
- Born: 26 February 2004 (age 22) Trento, Italy

Sport
- Country: Italy
- Sport: Speed skating
Medal record
Women's speed skating
Representing Italy
World Junior Championships
Gold medal – first place	2023 Inzell	500 m
Bronze medal – third place	2023 Inzell	Team sprint

Serena Pergher (born 26 February 2004) is an Italian speed skater. Pergher was 2023 World Junior Champion of the 500 meter event.

== Career ==
=== Junior ===
Pergher started speed skating at 6 years of age in Sports Club Pergine. She made her international debut at the 2020 Winter Youth Olympics. In December 2022 Pergher joined Gruppo Sportivo Fiamme Oro. She was 2023 World Junior Champion at the 500 meter event and helped team Italy obtain the bronze medal at the team sprint event. That year, she won also the ISU Junior World Cup at the 1000 meter race. In 2025 Pergher won the 500 meter race at the ISU Junior World Cup in Milan.

=== Senior ===
At the senior level, Pergher represented Italy at the 2023-24, 2024-25 and 2025-26 ISU World Cup at the 500 and 1000 meter races, obtaining a 5th place as her best result. Pergher represented Italy at the European Championships and World Championships from 2023 to 2026. Her performance at the 2025-26 World Cup earned Italy a quota place at the 500 and 1000 meter for the 2026 Winter Olympics.

== Results overview ==
Season	European Championships	World Sprint Championships	Olympic Games	World Single Distances Championship	World Junior Championships	Youth Olympic Games
2019–20					500m: 16th	500m: 9th 1500m: 30th Mass start: semifinal
2020–21						
2021–22					500m: 6th 1000m:35th Team sprint: 11th	
2022–23	Sprint: 11th overall				500m: (gold) 1000m: 5th Team sprint: (bronze)	
2023–24	Single Distances: 500m: 9th 1000m: 17th	1st 500m:17th 2nd 500m:18th 1st 1000m: 21st 2nd 1000m: 21st		500m: 12th		
2024–25	Sprint: 8th overall			500m: 8th		
2025–26	Single Distances: 500m: 4th 1000m: 15th		500m: 4th			

== Records ==
Personal records
Speed skating
Event	Result	Date	Location	Notes
500 m	37.29	15 November 2025	Utah Olympic Oval, Salt Lake City	Italian Record
1000 m	1:16.07	21 November 2025	Olympic Oval, Calgary	
1500 m	2:08.99	22 October 2023	Max Aicher Arena, Inzell	
3000 m	5:05.10	9 January 2022	Collalbo, Italy	
Mixed Relay	2:58.05	12 November 2023	World Cup, Obihiro	Italian Record, with Riccardo Lorello
