= Nikola Zdráhalová =

Czech speed skater (born 1996)

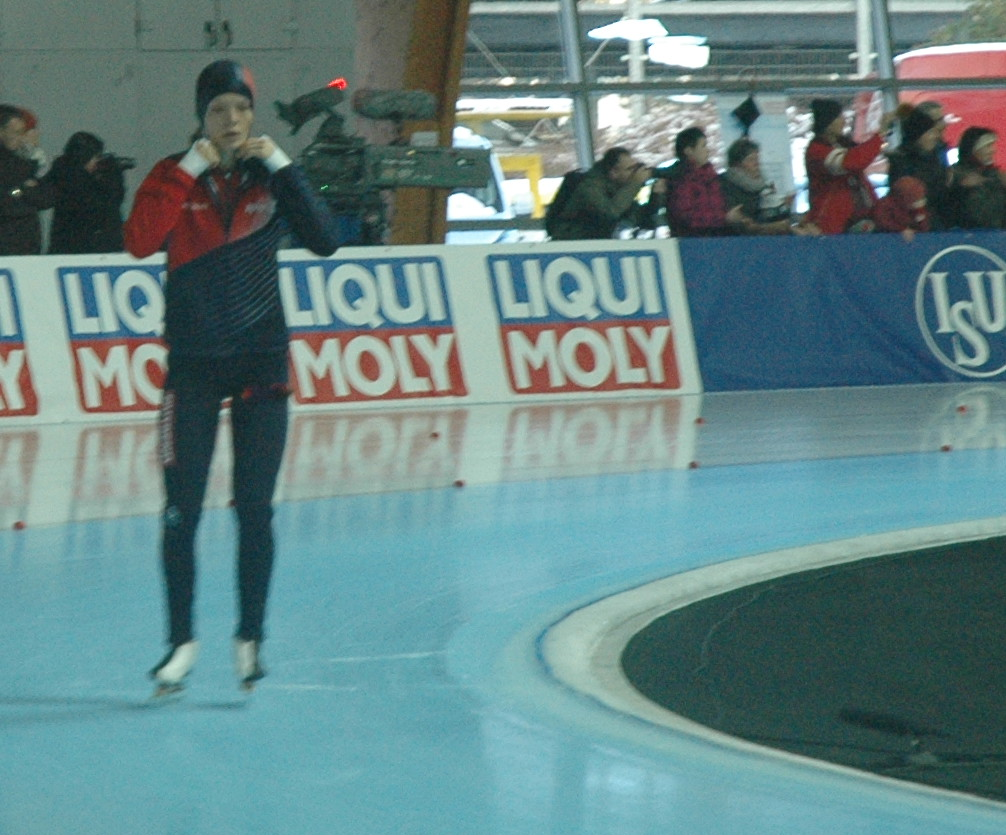

Personal information
- Born: 1 April 1996 (age 30) Dvůr Králové nad Labem, Czech Republic

Sport
- Country: Czech Republic
- Sport: Speed skating
- Club: NOVIS Team
Medal record
Representing Czech Republic
Women's speed skating
European Championships
Gold medal – first place	2026 Tomaszów Mazowiecki	1000 m
Silver medal – second place	2026 Tomaszów Mazowiecki	1500 m

Nikola Zdráhalová (born 1 April 1996) is a Czech speed skater. She competed in the women's 3000 metres at the 2018 Winter Olympics.

== Personal life ==
On 27 April 2025, Czech speed skater Martina Sáblíková in her post on Instagram revealed twelve year long relationship with Zdráhalová. They married in 2026.
