= Hayden Mayeur =

Canadian speed skater (born 1997)

Personal information
- Born: September 12, 1997 (age 29) Toronto, Ontario, Canada

Sport
- Country: Canada
- Sport: Speed skating
Medal record
Men's Speed skating
Representing Canada
World Single Distances Championships
Silver medal – second place	2023 Heerenveen	Team pursuit
Bronze medal – third place	2024 Calgary	Team pursuit
Four Continents Championships
Gold medal – first place	2020 Milwaukee	Team pursuit
Gold medal – first place	2022 Calgary	Team pursuit
Silver medal – second place	2022 Calgary	Mass start
Silver medal – second place	2024 Salt Lake City	Team pursuit
Bronze medal – third place	2025 Hachinohe	Mass start
Bronze medal – third place	2025 Hachinohe	Team pursuit
ISU Speed Skating World Cup
Silver medal – second place	2022 Calgary	Team pursuit
Bronze medal – third place	2022 Calgary	Mass Start

Hayden Mayeur (born September 12, 1997) is a Canadian speed skater.

== Career ==
January 2024: Hayden competed at the 2024 Four Continents Speed Skating Championships and won a silver medal in the team pursuit. The next month, he competed at the 2024 World Single Distances Speed Skating Championships and won a bronze medal in the team pursuit, with a time of 3:36.72. In November 2024, he competed at the 2025 Four Continents Speed Skating Championships and won bronze medals in the mass start and team pursuit events.

March 2023: Hayden competed at the 2023 World Single Distances Speed Skating Championships and won a bronze medal in the team pursuit, with a time of 3:38.43. He was named the Community Champion of the Year by Speed Skating Canada for the 2022–23 season.

December 2022: alongside Connor Howe and Antoine Gelinas-Beaulieu, they won a Silver medal in team pursuit with a time of 3:36.48 at the 2022-2023 ISU Speed Skating World Cup – World Cup 3. He also won his 1st World Cup Individual Medal at the Calgary World Cup finishing 3rd (Bronze).

December 2021: Hayden competed at the 2022 Four Continents Speed Skating Championships and won a gold medal in the team pursuit and a silver medal in the mass start. In January 2022, he was selected as an alternate to represent Canada at the 2022 Winter Olympics.

Over the seasons, Hayden became a Mass Start specialist and showed consistency over his career. He reached his first podium (3rd with Bronze) at the 2018-2019 Senior Canadian Championships. From then on, he medaled most seasons. He won his 1st Canadian title in 2019-2020, (3rd (Bronze) in 2021-2022, 2nd (Silver) in 2022-2023 and 2023-2024. In 2024-2025, he won his 2nd Canadian Title. In 2025-2026, he finished a close 5th, which unfortunately took him out of the race for a Mass Start spot for the 2026 Winter Olympics.

- He won his 1st World Cup Individual Medal at the Calgary World Cup in 2022-2023, finishing 3rd (Bronze).
- As a neo-senior, he won Bronze in 2018-2019 In Poland and Gold in 2019-2020 In Enschede, Netherlands at the Neo Senior World Cups.

Hayden made his first international appearance in 2018 at the Neo Senior World Cup. He reached the podium and won Bronze in the Mass Start in Poland. He doubled down in 2019, winning his first International Mass Start race in Enschede, Netherlands.

== Personal life ==
In April 2021, Mayeur opened the Hayloft Cafe, a 1978 Citroën 2CV truckette converted into a mobile cafe in Calgary.
