= Martyna Baran =

Polish speed skater (born 2001)

Personal information
- Born: 19 February 2001 (age 25) Warsaw, Poland

Sport
- Sport: Speed skating
- Event(s): 500 m, team sprint
Medal record
Women's speed skating
Representing Poland
European Championships
Gold medal – first place	2026 Tomaszów Mazowiecki	Team sprint

Martyna Baran (born 19 February 2001) is a Polish speed skater. She represented Poland at the 2026 Winter Olympics.

== Career ==
In January 2026, Baran competed at the 2026 European Speed Skating Championships and won a gold medal in the team sprint with a time of 1:27.07. She also finished in fifth place in the 500 metres with a time of 38.55 seconds. She was subsequently selected to represent Poland at the 2026 Winter Olympics.
