= 2024 World Single Distances Speed Skating Championships – Men's team pursuit =

Men's team pursuit at the 2024 World Single Distances Speed Skating Championships
- Venue: Olympic Oval
- Location: Calgary, Canada
- Dates: February 16
- Competitors: 24 from 8 nations
- Teams: 8
- Winning time: 3:35.00

Medalists
gold medal	Andrea Giovannini; Davide Ghiotto; Michele Malfatti	Italy
silver medal	Sander Eitrem; Peder Kongshaug; Sverre Lunde Pedersen	Norway
bronze medal	Connor Howe; Antoine Gélinas-Beaulieu; Hayden Mayeur	Canada

The Men's team pursuit competition at the 2024 World Single Distances Speed Skating Championships was held on February 16, 2024.

== Results ==
The race was started at 13:00.

Rank	Pair	Lane	Country	Time	Diff
1st place, gold medalist(s)	4	s	Italy; Andrea Giovannini; Davide Ghiotto; Michele Malfatti	3:35.00	
2nd place, silver medalist(s)	4	c	Norway; Sander Eitrem; Peder Kongshaug; Sverre Lunde Pedersen	3:36.07	+1.07
3rd place, bronze medalist(s)	1	c	Canada; Connor Howe; Antoine Gélinas-Beaulieu; Hayden Mayeur	3:36.72	+1.72
4	3	c	United States; Casey Dawson; Emery Lehman; Ethan Cepuran	3:38.64	+3.64
5	3	s	Netherlands; Chris Huizinga; Marcel Bosker; Beau Snellink	3:40.50	+5.50
6	2	c	Belgium; Jason Suttels; Indra Médard; Bart Swings	3:40.79	+5.79
7	2	s	China; Wang Shuaihan; Wu Yu; Sun Chuanyi	3:45.23	+10.23
8	1	s	France; Timothy Loubineaud; Mathieu Belloir; Valentin Thiebault	3:46.15	+11.15
