= Sanne in 't Hof =

Dutch female speed skater (born 1991)

Personal information
- Born: 24 January 1998 (age 28) Schalkhaar, Overijssel, Netherlands

Sport
- Country: Netherlands
- Sport: Speed skating
- Turned pro: 2017
Medal record
Women's speed skating
Representing the Netherlands
European Championships
Gold medal – first place	2026 Tomaszów Mazowiecki	Team pursuit
Bronze medal – third place	2026 Tomaszów Mazowiecki	3000 m

Sanne in 't Hof (born 24 January 1998) is a Dutch female speed skater who specialises in middle and long distances.

== Career ==
At the junior World Championships in 2017 she won silver in the 1500m, 3000m and mass start events.

In 't Hof qualified for the 5000m at the 2022 Winter Olympics by finishing second in the Dutch Olympic qualifying event.

In ´t Hof won a bronze medal at the 3000m event of the 2026 European Speed Skating championships in Poland.

== Personal bests ==
Personal records
Speed skating
Event	Result	Date	Location	Notes
500 m	40.54	19 January 2019	Thialf, Heerenveen	
1000 m	1:17.73	14 March 2019	Olympic Oval, Calgary	
1500 m	1:58.83	17 March 2019	Olympic Oval, Calgary	
3000 m	3:57.78	21 November 2025	Olympic Oval, Calgary	
5000 m	6:47.28	16 December 2022	Olympic Oval, Calgary	
