= Ewa Chodakowska =

Polish fitness trainer and entrepreneur

Ewa Chodakowska is a Polish fitness trainer, media personality and entrepreneur. She is known in Poland for her home fitness programmes, later expanding into the fitness, online training, diet services, food and cosmetics fields.

== Fitness and media career ==
=== Early career ===
Chodakowska created home fitness programmes in Poland in the early 2010s. She became popular among female followers partly because of her informal, direct and supportive style of communication. The term "Ewa Chodakowska method" has been used in academic research examining her approach to fitness promotion and communication.

=== Guinness World Record attempts ===
In June 2014, Chodakowska led a large group workout during the "all in for #mygirls" event at Legia Warsaw Stadium. This event set a Guinness World Record. In 2017, she led another group fitness event with Eleftherios Kavoukis during the finale of the BeActive Tour. This included a Guinness World Record attempt involving the plank position.

=== Non-fitness TV shows ===
In 2019, Chodakowska was a juror on the TVP reality TV show Dance Dance Dance. In 2024, she co-hosted the TVN programme Razem OdNowa with Joanna Krupa. The programme averaged 534,000 viewers. In 2026, she was announced as the host of Ocal siebie, a monthly video podcast for the YouTube channel of Viva! about self-acceptance, mental health and wellbeing.

== Business activities ==
As well as her media career, Chodakowska has developed businesses connected with fitness, food, cosmetics and diet services. By 2020, she was a co-owner of nine companies operating in these sectors. BeBio, jointly owned by Chodakowska and Eleftherios Kavoukis, recorded 14.89 million złoty in sales revenue and 4.68 million złoty in net profit in 2019.

In 2022, Chodakowska became a shareholder in FoodWell, following the creation of the company through the merger of Bakalland and Purella. Chodakowskiej and her husband had previously had a significant shareholding in Purella

In 2024, Chodakowska became a Reebok ambassador through a collaboration with CCC Group. Her role included participation in the development and communication of Reebok collections.

== Public activities ==
In February 2026, Chodakowska and her foundation initiated the social campaign Pokochaj swoje ciało. Ocal swoje życie ("Love your body. Save your life"). The campaign addressed obesity and the stigmatisation of people living with obesity and was supported by the Philanthropic Consortium and the Omenaa Foundation.
