= Tim Prins =

Dutch speed skater (born 2003)

Personal information
- Born: 3 August 2003 (age 22) Joure, Netherlands

Sport
- Country: Netherlands
- Sport: Speed skating
- Club: Team Reggeborgh
Medal record
Men's speed skating
Representing the Netherlands
World Single Distances Championships
Silver medal – second place	2024 Calgary	Team sprint
Silver medal – second place	2025 Hamar	Team sprint
European Championships
Silver medal – second place	2026 Tomaszów Mazowiecki	1000 m
Bronze medal – third place	2024 Heerenveen	1000 m
Bronze medal – third place	2025 Heerenveen	Sprint
Bronze medal – third place	2026 Tomaszów Mazowiecki	1500 m

Tim Prins (born 3 August 2003) is a Dutch speed skater who specializes in the sprint distances and the 1500 m.

== Career ==
At the 2024 European Speed Skating Championships, held at Thialf in Heerenveen, Netherlands, Prins won a bronze medal in the 1000 m. At the 2023–24 ISU Speed Skating World Cup – World Cup 5, held in January 2024 at the Utah Olympic Oval in Salt Lake City, United States he finished second in the second 1000m race.

Prins is a member of Team Reggeborgh.

== Personal records ==
Personal records
Speed skating
Event	Result	Date	Location	Notes
500 m	34.76	24 February 2024	Thialf, Heerenveen	
1000 m	1:06.41	28 January 2024	Utah Olympic Oval, Salt Lake City	
1500 m	1:42.36	15 November 2025	Utah Olympic Oval, Salt Lake City	
5000 m	6:47.82	11 February 2023	Max Aicher Arena, Inzell	
