= Fran Vanhoutte =

Belgian speed skater (born 2003)

Personal information
- Nationality: Belgian
- Born: 24 May 2003 (age 23) Ostend, Belgium

Sport
- Sport: Inline skating Speed skating
- Club: Zwaantjes Roller Club; Team Novus
Medal record
Representing Belgium
Women's speed skating
European Championships
Silver medal – second place	2026 Tomaszów Mazowiecki	Team sprint
Silver medal – second place	2026 Tomaszów Mazowiecki	Team pursuit
Bronze medal – third place	2026 Tomaszów Mazowiecki	Mass start
Women's inline speed skating
World Games
Gold medal – first place	2025 Chengdu	Track 500 m sprint
Silver medal – second place	2025 Chengdu	Road 1 Lap
Bronze medal – third place	2025 Chengdu	Track 200 m time trial
Bronze medal – third place	2025 Chengdu	Track 1000 m sprint

Fran Vanhoutte (born 24 May 2003) is a Belgian inline skater and speed skater.

Vanhoutte won 1 gold and 3 bronze medals at the 2024 European Championships inline skating in Ostend. At the 2025 World Games she won 1 gold and 2 bronze medals on the track, and 1 silver medal in the road races.

Vanhoutte won two silver medals and a bronze medal at the 2026 European Speed Skating Championships, the silvers at the team sprint and the team pursuit, and an individual bronze at the mass start.

== Personal records ==
Personal records
Speed skating
Event	Result	Date	Location	Notes
500 m	38.06	16 November 2025	Utah Olympic Oval, Salt Lake City	
1000 m	1:15.25	7 November 2025	Utah Olympic Oval, Salt Lake City	
1500 m	2:03.83	15 November 2025	Max Aicher Arena, Inzell	
3000 m	4:20.33	27 September 2025	Thialf, Heerenveen	
