= Sofia Thorup =

Russian-Danish speed skater (born 1997)

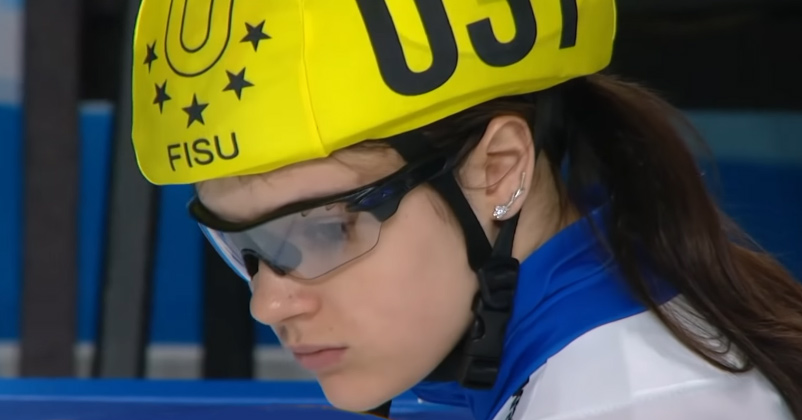
- Prosvirnova at the 29th Winter Universiade (2019), Krasnoyarsk, Russia

Personal information
- Nationality: Russian; Danish
- Born: Sofia Sergeyevna Prosvirnova; 20 December 1997 (age 28) Saint Petersburg, Russia
- Height: 1.68 m (5 ft 6 in)
- Weight: 60 kg (132 lb)
- Spouse: Viktor Hald Thorup (m. 2023)

Sport
- Country: Russia (-2023); Denmark (2023-)
- Sport: Short track speed skating Speed skating
- Events: 500 m, 1000 m, 1500 m
- Club: Olympic Hopes
- Coached by: Andrey Maksimov; Svetlana Tretyakova
- World Cup wins: 5

Achievements and titles
- Personal bests: 500 m: 42.911 (2019); 1000 m: 1:28.101 (2019); 1500 m: 2:20.001 (2017); 3000 m: 5:01.580 (2018)
Medal record
Women's speed skating
Representing Denmark
European Championships
Gold medal – first place	2026 Tomaszów Mazowiecki	Mass start
Women's short-track speed skating
Representing Russia
World championships
Silver medal – second place	2018 Montreal	1000 m
Silver medal – second place	2019 Sofia	3000 m relay
Bronze medal – third place	2016 Seoul	3000 m relay
Bronze medal – third place	2019 Sofia	1500 m
European Championships
Gold medal – first place	2015 Dordrecht	1000 m
Gold medal – first place	2015 Dordrecht	3000 m relay
Gold medal – first place	2017 Torino	1000 m
Gold medal – first place	2018 Dresden	3000 m relay
Gold medal – first place	2019 Dordrecht	1000 m
Silver medal – second place	2015 Dordrecht	Overall
Silver medal – second place	2015 Dordrecht	500 m
Silver medal – second place	2015 Dordrecht	1500 m
Silver medal – second place	2017 Torino	Overall
Silver medal – second place	2017 Torino	1500 m
Silver medal – second place	2019 Dordrecht	Overall
Silver medal – second place	2019 Dordrecht	3000 m relay
Bronze medal – third place	2018 Dresden	Overall
Bronze medal – third place	2018 Dresden	500 m
Bronze medal – third place	2019 Dordrecht	1500 m
Bronze medal – third place	2019 Dordrecht	3000 m relay
Bronze medal – third place	2020 Debrecen	3000 m relay
Bronze medal – third place	2021 Gdańsk	1500 m
Bronze medal – third place	2021 Gdańsk	Overall
Winter Universiade
Gold medal – first place	2019 Krasnoyarsk	3000 m relay

Sofia Sergeyevna Thorup (née Prosvirnova, Russian: Софья Сергеевна Просвирнова; born 20 December 1997) is a Russian-born Danish short track and long track speed skater.

== Career ==
She competed at the 2014 Winter Olympics in the individual 500 m and 1,000 m events and in the 3,000 meters relay and placed 15th, 24th and 4th, respectively.

In April 2023, after marrying Danish speed skater Viktor Hald Thorup, Sofia Prosvirnova announced to switching nationality to represent Denmark, while also leaving short track for long track speed skating.

She qualified for the 2026 Winter Olympics, but she was denied of a Danish citizenship due to her path not being a good role model for youngsters, therefore she could not participate.

== World Cup results ==
=== Podiums ===
Date	Season	Location	Rank	Event
16 November 2014	2014–15	Montreal	3rd place, bronze medalist(s)	3000m relay
21 December 2014	2014–15	Seoul	3rd place, bronze medalist(s)	3000m relay
15 February 2015	2014–15	Erzurum	2nd place, silver medalist(s)	500m
1 November 2015	2015–16	Montreal	3rd place, bronze medalist(s)	500m
1 November 2015	2015–16	Montreal	3rd place, bronze medalist(s)	3000m relay
6 November 2015	2015–16	Toronto	3rd place, bronze medalist(s)	3000m relay
12 February 2017	2016–17	Minsk	1st place, gold medalist(s)	3000m relay
1 October 2017	2017–18	Budapest	3rd place, bronze medalist(s)	3000m relay
11 November 2017	2017–18	Shanghai	3rd place, bronze medalist(s)	500m
19 November 2017	2017–18	Seoul	2nd place, silver medalist(s)	3000m relay
4 November 2018	2018–19	Calgary	2nd place, silver medalist(s)	1000m
4 November 2018	2018–19	Calgary	1st place, gold medalist(s)	3000m relay
10 November 2018	2018–19	Salt Lake City	2nd place, silver medalist(s)	1000m
11 November 2018	2018–19	Salt Lake City	2nd place, silver medalist(s)	3000m relay
2 February 2019	2018–19	Dresden	1st place, gold medalist(s)	1000m
3 February 2019	2018–19	Dresden	1st place, gold medalist(s)	2000m mixed relay
3 February 2019	2018–19	Dresden	1st place, gold medalist(s)	3000m relay

=== Overall rankings ===
Season	Event	Rank
2018–19	1000m	2nd place, silver medalist(s)
