= 2026 European Speed Skating Championships =

Speed skating event in Poland

- Venue: Ice Arena, Tomaszów Mazowiecki, Poland
- Dates: 9–11 January
- Competitors: 121 from 19 nations

The 2026 European Speed Skating Championships took place from 9 to 11 January 2026, at the Ice Arena in Tomaszów Mazowiecki, Poland.

Damian Zurek of Poland and Ragne Wiklund from Norway won two individual gold medals each.

The proximity of the 2026 Winter Olympics affected the list of participants. The Netherlands was mostly represented by skaters who are not in the Olympic selection. Germany would make a final selection based on performance at the European Championships. The final entry list had 121 competitors from 19 nations.

== Schedule ==
Since 2017, the format in even years is a single distance championship in which the winner of each distance earns the title of European champion.

All times are local (UTC+1).

Date	Time	Events
9 January	19:30	Team sprint women
9 January		Team pursuit men
9 January		3000 m women
9 January		1000 m men
10 January	14:00	Team sprint men
10 January		500 m women
10 January		5000 m men
10 January		1500 m women
11 January	13:45	Team pursuit women
11 January		1500 m men
11 January		1000 m women
11 January		500 m men
11 January		Mass start women
11 January		Mass start men

== Medal summary ==
=== Medal table ===
* Host nation (Poland)

Rank	Nation	Gold	Silver	Bronze	Total
1	Poland*	6	3	1	10
2	Norway	3	0	3	6
3	Netherlands	1	5	5	11
4	Belgium	1	3	1	5
5	Italy	1	2	2	5
6	Czech Republic	1	1	0	2
7	Denmark	1	0	0	1
8	Estonia	0	0	1	1
8	Germany	0	0	1	1
Totals (9 entries)		14	14	14	42

=== Men's events ===
Event	Gold		Silver		Bronze	
500 m	Damian Żurek; Poland	34.52	Marek Kania; Poland	34.82	Bjørn Magnussen; Norway	35.12
1000 m	Damian Żurek; Poland	1:08.55	Tim Prins; Netherlands	1:09.35	Marten Liiv; Estonia	1:09.61
1500 m	Peder Kongshaug; Norway	1:46.08	Vladimir Semirunniy; Poland	1:46.50	Tim Prins; Netherlands	1:46.61
5000 m	Vladimir Semirunniy; Poland	6:11.13	Riccardo Lorello; Italy	6:14.49	Davide Ghiotto; Italy	6:17.00
Team pursuit	Italy; Davide Ghiotto; Andrea Giovannini; Michele Malfatti	3:40.96	Netherlands; Louis Hollaar; Wisse Slendebroek; Kars Jansman	3:45.66	Norway; Peder Kongshaug; Didrik Eng Strand; Sigurd Henriksen	3:47.15
Team sprint	Poland; Piotr Michalski; Marek Kania; Szymon Wojtakowski	1:20.22	Netherlands; Stefan Westenbroek; Kayo Vos; Merijn Scheperkamp	1:20.24	Norway; Siver Brattgjerd; Henrik Fagerli Rukke; Bjørn Magnussen	1:20.31
Mass start	Bart Swings; Belgium	60 pts	Bart Hoolwerf; Netherlands	41 pts	Andrea Giovannini; Italy	22 pts

=== Women's events ===
Event	Gold		Silver		Bronze	
500 m	Kaja Ziomek-Nogal; Poland	37.79	Andżelika Wójcik; Poland	38.27	Isabel Grevelt; Netherlands	38.37
1000 m	Nikola Zdráhalová; Czech Republic	1:16.06	Chloé Hoogendoorn; Netherlands	1:16.34	Isabel Grevelt; Netherlands	1:16.37
1500 m	Ragne Wiklund; Norway	1:56.24	Nikola Zdráhalová; Czech Republic	1:56.53	Chloé Hoogendoorn; Netherlands	1:57.64
3000 m	Ragne Wiklund; Norway	4:00.54	Sandrine Tas; Belgium	4:05.26	Sanne in 't Hof; Netherlands	4:05.91
Team pursuit	Netherlands; Sanne in 't Hof; Evelien Vijn; Kim Talsma	3:01.35	Belgium; Fran Vanhoutte; Isabelle van Elst; Sandrine Tas	3:03.97	Poland; Zofia Braun; Natalia Jabrzyk; Magdalena Czyszczoń	3:07.72
Team sprint	Poland; Martyna Baran; Kaja Ziomek-Nogal; Karolina Bosiek	1:27.07	Belgium; Fran Vanhoutte; Isabelle van Elst; Sandrine Tas	1:32.65	Germany; Katja Franzen; Anna Ostlender; Isabel Kraus	1:34.52
Mass start	Sofia Thorup; Denmark	60 pts	Francesca Lollobrigida; Italy	41 pts	Fran Vanhoutte; Belgium	20 pts
