= 2025–26 ISU Speed Skating World Cup – World Cup 5 =

Ice skating competition in Inzell, Germany

2025–26 ISU Speed Skating World Cup 5
- Venue: Max Aicher Arena; Inzell; Germany
- Dates: 23 — 25 January 2026

The fifth competition weekend of the 2025–26 ISU Speed Skating World Cup took place at the Max Aicher Arena in Inzell, Germany, from Friday, 23 January, until Sunday, 25 January 2026. It is the fifth and final event of the tour, that determines qualification for the 2026 World Allround Speed Skating Championships and the 2026 World Sprint Speed Skating Championships. It is seen as the final test event for the 2026 Winter Olympics.

Norwegian Sander Eitrem established a new world record at the 5000 meter race and became the first person to cover the distance in less than 6 minutes.

== Medal summary ==
=== Men's events ===
Event	Gold	Time	Silver	Time	Bronze	Time	Report
500 m (1)	Damian Żurek; Poland	34.09; TR	Jordan Stolz; United States	34.26	Marten Liiv; Estonia	34.29	
500 m (2)	Damian Żurek; Poland	34.06; TR	Jordan Stolz; United States	34.10	Marek Kania; Poland	34.29	
1000 m	Jordan Stolz; United States	1:06.83; TR	Damian Żurek; Poland	1:07.20	Joep Wennemars; Netherlands	1:07.23	
1500 m	Jordan Stolz; United States	1:41.95	Ning Zhongyan; China	1:43.18	Kjeld Nuis; Netherlands	1:43.81	
5000 m	Sander Eitrem; Norway	5:58.52; WR; TR; PB	Metoděj Jílek; Czech Republic	6:01.98; PB	Timothy Loubineaud; France	6:03.65	
Mass start^{A}	Metoděj Jílek; Czech Republic	66	Mathieu Belloir; France	41	Andrea Giovannini; Italy	20	
Team sprint	United States; Conor McDermott-Mostowy; Cooper McLeod; Zach Stoppelmoor	1:17.61	Norway; Siver Brattgjerd; Henrik Fagerli Rukke; Bjørn Magnussen	1:18.27	Netherlands; Stefan Westenbroek; Kayo Vos; Merijn Scheperkamp	1:19.33	

^{A} In mass start, race points are accumulated during the race based on results of the intermediate sprints and the final sprint. The skater with most race points is the winner.

=== Women's events ===
Event	Gold	Time	Silver	Time	Bronze	Time	Report
500 m (1)	Femke Kok; Netherlands	36.87; TR	Jutta Leerdam; Netherlands	37.22	Kaja Ziomek-Nogal; Poland	37.22	
500 m (2)	Kaja Ziomek-Nogal; Poland	37.25	Sophie Warmuth; Germany	37.61	Marrit Fledderus; Netherlands	37.62	
1000 m	Jutta Leerdam; Netherlands	1:12.74; TR	Miho Takagi; Japan	1:13.43	Femke Kok; Netherlands	1:13.67	
1500 m	Joy Beune; Netherlands	1:53.34	Miho Takagi; Japan	1:53.59	Ragne Wiklund; Norway	1:53.72	
3000 m	Ragne Wiklund; Norway	3:54.74; TR; PB	Joy Beune; Netherlands	3:56.96	Valérie Maltais; Canada	3:59.92	
Mass start^{A}	Marijke Groenewoud; Netherlands	60	Valérie Maltais; Canada	40	Mia Manganello; United States	20	
Team sprint	Netherlands; Marrit Fledderus; Naomi Verkerk; Isabel Grevelt	1:25.52	Canada; Carolina Hiller-Donnelly; Béatrice Lamarche; Ivanie Blondin	1:26.84	Germany; Katja Franzen; Josephine Heimerl; Anna Ostlender	1:28.45	

^{A} In mass start, race points are accumulated during the race based on results of the intermediate sprints and the final sprint. The skater with most race points is the winner.

== Medal count ==
* Host nation (Germany)

Rank	Nation	Gold	Silver	Bronze	Total
1	Netherlands	5	2	5	12
2	United States	3	2	1	6
3	Poland	3	1	2	6
4	Norway	2	1	1	4
5	Czech Republic	1	1	0	2
6	Canada	0	2	1	3
7	Japan	0	2	0	2
8	France	0	1	1	2
8	Germany	0	1	1	2
10	China	0	1	0	1
11	Estonia	0	0	1	1
11	Italy	0	0	1	1
Totals (12 entries)		14	14	14	42

== Results ==
=== Men's events ===
==== 1st 500 m ====
The race started on 23 January 2026 at 18:58.

Rank	Pair	Lane	Name	Country	Time	Diff	WC Points
1st place, gold medalist(s)	10	o	Damian Zurek	Poland	34.09; TR		60
2nd place, silver medalist(s)	9	i	Jordan Stolz	United States	34.26	+0.17	54
3rd place, bronze medalist(s)	5	i	Marten Liiv	Estonia	34.29	+0.20	48
4	7	i	Yevgeniy Koshkin	Kazakhstan	34.34	+0.25	43
5	8	o	Bjørn Magnussen	Norway	34.37	+0.28	40
6	3	o	Marek Kania	Poland	34.42	+0.33	38
7	10	i	Jenning de Boo	Netherlands	34.51	+0.42	36
8	7	o	Yuta Hirose	Japan	34.57	+0.48	34
9	6	o	Cooper McLeod	United States	34.68	+0.59	32
10	3	i	Katsuhiro Kuratsubo	Japan	34.68	+0.59	31
11	4	i	Tatsuya Shinhama	Japan	34.72	+0.63	30
12	8	i	Sebas Diniz	Netherlands	34.75	+0.66	29
13	2	o	Joep Wennemars	Netherlands	34.93	+0.84	28
14	4	o	Lian Ziwen	China	34.97	+0.88	27
15	1	i	Nil Llop Izquierdo	Spain	35.13	+1.04	26
16	1	o	Jeffrey Rosanelli	Italy	42.74	+8.65	25
17	9	o	Wataru Morishige	Japan	1:37.87	+1:03.78	24
18	2	i	Cedric Brunet	Canada	DNF		23
18	5	o	Laurent Dubreuil	Canada	DNF		23
18	6	i	Kim Jun-ho	South Korea	DNF		23

==== 2nd 500 m ====
The race started on 25 January 2026 at 14:28.

Rank	Pair	Lane	Name	Country	Time	Diff	WC Points
1st place, gold medalist(s)	10	i	Damian Żurek	Poland	34.06; TR		60
2nd place, silver medalist(s)	10	o	Jordan Stolz	United States	34.10	+0.04	54
3rd place, bronze medalist(s)	3	i	Marek Kania	Poland	34.29	+0.23	48
4	8	i	Jenning de Boo	Netherlands	34.37	+0.31	43
5	5	i	Kim Jun-ho	South Korea	34.37	+0.31	40
6	1	o	Stefan Westenbroek	Netherlands	34.41	+0.35	38
7	9	o	Bjørn Magnussen	Norway	34.47	+0.41	36
8	2	o	Anders Johnson	Canada	34.49	+0.43	34
9	7	i	Marten Liiv	Estonia	34.53	+0.47	32
10	1	i	Chung Jae-woong	South Korea	34.53	+0.47	31
11	7	o	Sebas Diniz	Netherlands	34.63	+0.57	30
12	5	o	Katsuhiro Kuratsubo	Japan	34.64	+0.58	29
12	6	o	Cooper McLeod	United States	34.64	+0.58	29
14	2	i	Piotr Michalski	Poland	34.66	+0.60	27
15	6	i	Yuta Hirose	Japan	34.69	+0.63	26
16	4	i	Lian Ziwen	China	34.85	+0.79	25
17	4	o	Cedrick Brunet	Canada	35.08	+1.02	24
18	3	o	Nil Llop Izquierdo	Spain	35.15	+1.09	23
19	9	i	Wataru Morishige	Japan	DNF		22
	8	o	Yevgeniy Koshkin	Kazakhstan	DQ		

==== 1000 m ====
The race started on 24 January at 15:11.

Rank	Pair	Lane	Name	Country	Time	Diff	WC Points
1st place, gold medalist(s)	9	o	Jordan Stolz	United States	1:06.83; TR		60
2nd place, silver medalist(s)	10	o	Damian Żurek	Poland	1:07.20	+0.37	54
3rd place, bronze medalist(s)	5	o	Joep Wennemars	Netherlands	1:07.23	+0.40	48
4	10	i	Jenning de Boo	Netherlands	1:07.39	+0.56	43
5	7	i	Cooper McLeod	United States	1:07.68	+0.85	40
6	8	i	Tim Prins	Netherlands	1:07.84	+1.01	38
7	6	i	Conor McDermott-Mostowy	United States	1:07.92	+1.09	36
8	8	o	Marten Liiv	Estonia	1:07.95	+1.12	34
9	6	o	Ryota Kojima	Japan	1:08.02	+1.19	32
10	5	i	Lian Ziwen	China	1:08.07	+1.24	31
11	9	i	Finn Sonnekalb	Germany	1:08.12	+1.29	30
12	1	i	Merijn Scheperkamp	Netherlands	1:08.21	+1.38	29
13	4	o	Taiyo Nonomura	Japan	1:08.32	+1.49	28
14	2	i	Piotr Michalski	Poland	1:08.45	+1.62	27
15	7	o	Ning Zhongyan	China	1:08.51	+1.68	26
16	1	o	David La Rue	Canada	1:08.67	+1.84	25
17	3	i	Mathias Vosté	Belgium	1:08.68	+1.85	24
18	2	o	Moritz Klein	Germany	1:08.90	+2.07	23
19	3	o	Hendrik Dombek	Germany	1:09.31	+2.48	22
20	4	i	Kjeld Nuis	Netherlands	DNF		21

==== 1500 m ====
The race started on 23 January 2026 at 20:18.

Rank	Pair	Lane	Name	Country	Time	Diff	WC Points
1st place, gold medalist(s)	9	o	Jordan Stolz	United States	1:41.95		60
2nd place, silver medalist(s)	8	i	Ning Zhongyan	China	1:43.18	+1.23	54
3rd place, bronze medalist(s)	10	o	Kjeld Nuis	Netherlands	1:43.81	+1.86	48
4	9	i	Sander Eitrem	Norway	1:43.90	+1.95	43
5	4	i	Metoděj Jílek	Czech Republic	1:44.05	+2.10	40
6	7	o	Daniele Di Stefano	Italy	1:44.12	+2.17	38
7	1	o	Li Wenhao	China	1:44.47	+2.52	36
8	7	i	Gabriel Odor	Austria	1:44.68	+2.73	34
9	10	i	Finn Sonnekalb	Germany	1:44.78	+2.83	32
10	3	o	Valentin Thiebault	France	1:44.87	+2.92	31
11	5	i	Taiyo Nonomura	Japan	1:45.13	+3.18	30
12	8	o	Tim Prins	Netherlands	1:45.13	+3.18	29
13	3	i	Vladimir Semirunniy	Poland	1:45.32	+3.37	28
14	2	i	David La Rue	Canada	1:45.46	+3.51	27
15	6	o	Tijmen Snel	Netherlands	1:45.49	+3.54	26
16	4	o	Hendrik Dombek	Germany	1:45.58	+3.63	25
17	2	o	Emery Lehman	United States	1:45.70	+3.75	24
18	1	i	Moritz Klein	Germany	1:45.86	+3.91	23
19	6	i	Kazuya Yamada	Japan	1:47.08	+5.13	22
	5	o	Alexander Farthofer	Austria	DQ		

==== 5000 m ====
The race started on 24 January 2026 at 17:00.

Rank	Pair	Lane	Name	Country	Time	Diff	WC Points
1st place, gold medalist(s)	8	o	Sander Eitrem	Norway	5:58.52; WR; TR; PB		60
2nd place, silver medalist(s)	8	i	Metoděj Jílek	Czech Republic	6:01.98; PB	+3.46	54
3rd place, bronze medalist(s)	6	o	Timothy Loubineaud	France	6:03.65	+5.13	48
4	7	o	Casey Dawson	United States	6:05.13	+6.61	43
5	6	i	Davide Ghiotto	Italy	6:05.67	+7.15	40
6	1	i	Vladimir Semirunniy	Poland	6:07.81; PB	+9.29	38
7	4	i	Michele Malfatti	Italy	6:10.53	+12.01	36
8	5	i	Chris Huizinga	Netherlands	6:12.27	+13.75	34
9	2	i	Fridtjof Petzold	Germany	6:13.43	+14.91	32
10	2	o	Sigurd Henriksen	Norway	6:14.98	+16.46	31
11	1	o	Viktor Hald Thorup	Denmark	6:15.24	+16.72	30
12	5	o	Jorrit Bergsma	Netherlands	6:15.34	+16.82	29
13	3	i	Felix Maly	Germany	6:16.26	+17.74	28
14	3	o	Bart Swings	Belgium	6:16.74	+18.22	27
15	4	o	Alexander Farthofer	Austria	6:22.33	+23.81	26
16	7	i	Ted-Jan Bloemen	Canada	6:25.17	+26.65	25

==== Mass start ====
The race started on 25 January 2026 at 15:41.

Rank	Name	Country	Points	Time	WC Points
1st place, gold medalist(s)	Metoděj Jílek	Czech Republic	66	7:41.19	60
2nd place, silver medalist(s)	Mathieu Belloir	France	41	7:43.03	54
3rd place, bronze medalist(s)	Andrea Giovannini	Italy	20	7:43.07	48
4	Viktor Hald Thorup	Denmark	13	7:43.24	43
5	Bart Swings	Belgium	6	7:43.48	40
6	Livio Wenger	Switzerland	3	7:43.68	38
7	Shomu Sasaki	Japan	3	7:44.75	36
8	Timothy Loubineaud	France	2	7:46.02	34
9	Felix Maly	Germany	2	7:56.67	32
10	Philip Due Schmidt	Denmark	1	7:49.45	31
11	Jorrit Bergsma	Netherlands		7:44.14	30
12	Gabriel Odor	Austria		7:44.50	29
13	Li Yuhaochen	China		7:44.94	28
14	Fridtjof Petzold	Germany		7:45.13	27
15	Antoine Gélinas-Beaulieu	Canada		7:45.86	26
16	Ethan Cepuran	United States		7:46.20	25
17	Marcin Bachanek	Poland		7:46.37	24
18	Daniel Hall	Canada		7:47.25	23
19	Stijn van de Bunt	Netherlands		7:47.93	22
20	Miguel Bravo	Portugal		7:49.63	21
21	Sigurd Holbø Dyrset	Norway		7:50.34	20
22	Indra Medard	Belgium		7:56.88	19
23	Vadim Yakubovskiy	Kazakhstan			18

==== Team sprint ====
The race started on 25 January 2026 at 16:37.

Rank	Pair	Lane	Country	Time	Diff	WC Points
1st place, gold medalist(s)	5	c	United States; Conor McDermott-Mostowy; Cooper McLeod; Zach Stoppelmoor	1:17.61		60
2nd place, silver medalist(s)	5	s	Norway; Siver Brattgjerd; Henrik Fagerli Rukke; Bjørn Magnussen	1:18.27	+0.66	54
3rd place, bronze medalist(s)	6	s	Netherlands; Stefan Westenbroek; Kayo Vos; Merijn Scheperkamp	1:19.33	+1.72	48
4	4	s	Switzerland; Oliver Grob; Flavio Gross; Livio Wenger	1:20.69	+3.08	43
5	1	c	Germany; Maximilian Strübe; Tomy Nguyen; Stefan Emele	1:20.77	+3.16	40
6	6	c	Poland; Kacper Abratkiewicz; Szymon Wojtakowski; Mateusz Śliwka	1:21.11	+3.50	38
7	3	c	Hungary; Botond Bejczi; Bálint Bödei; Konrád Nagy	1:21.41	+3.80	36
8	4	c	China; Deng Zhihan; Cao Jingqi; Li Wenhao	1:21.44	+3.83	34
9	2	c	Spain; Alexander Rezzonico; Daniel Milagros; Manuel Robla	1:22.23	+4.62	32
10	3	s	Kazakhstan; Nuraly Akzhol; Aleksandr Klenko; Roman Binazarov	1:23.11	+5.50	31
11	1	s	Czech Republic; Jakub Kočí; Tadeáš Procházka; Metoděj Jílek	1:24.42	+6.81	30
12	2	s	Finland; Max Kokko; Alvar Muhonen; Juuso Lehtonen	DNF		29

=== Women's events ===
==== 1st 500 m ====
The race started on 23 January 2026 at 18:30.

Rank	Pair	Lane	Name	Country	Time	Diff	WC Points
1st place, gold medalist(s)	9	i	Femke Kok	Netherlands	36.87; TR		60
2nd place, silver medalist(s)	6	i	Jutta Leerdam	Netherlands	37.22	+0.35	54
3rd place, bronze medalist(s)	10	i	Kaja Ziomek-Nogal	Poland	37.22	+0.35	48
4	9	o	Erin Jackson	United States	37.44	+0.57	43
5	6	o	Andżelika Wójcik	Poland	37.50	+0.62	40
6	7	o	Béatrice Lamarche	Canada	37.60	+0.72	38
7	5	o	Rio Yamada	Japan	37.76	+0.88	36
8	3	i	Carolina Hiller-Donnelly	Canada	37.88	+1.00	34
9	8	o	Marrit Fledderus	Netherlands	37.97	+1.09	32
10	8	i	Martyna Baran	Poland	38.06	+1.19	31
11	5	i	Kristina Silaeva	Kazakhstan	38.08	+1.20	30
12	4	o	Kurumi Inagawa	Japan	38.10	+1.22	29
13	1	o	Karolina Bosiek	Poland	38.22	+1.34	28
14	10	o	Serena Pergher	Italy	38.25	+1.37	27
15	2	o	Jung Hui-dan	South Korea	38.32	+1.45	26
16	1	i	Sofia Thorup	Denmark	38.32	+1.45	25
17	4	i	Tian Ruining	China	38.38	+1.50	24
18	3	o	Wang Jingziqian	China	38.40	+1.53	23
19	2	i	Brooklyn McDougall	Canada	38.43	+1.56	22
20	7	i	Sophie Warmuth	Germany	1:25.16	+48.28	21

==== 2nd 500 m ====
The race started on 25 January 2026 at 14:00.

Rank	Pair	Lane	Name	Country	Time	Diff	WC Points
1st place, gold medalist(s)	10	i	Kaja Ziomek-Nogal	Poland	37.25		60
2nd place, silver medalist(s)	7	o	Sophie Warmuth	Germany	37.61	+0.36	54
3rd place, bronze medalist(s)	9	i	Marrit Fledderus	Netherlands	37.62	+0.37	48
4	1	o	Isabel Grevelt	Netherlands	37.67	+0.42	43
4	6	o	Kristina Silaeva	Kazakhstan	37.67	+0.42	43
6	7	i	Andżelika Wójcik	Poland	37.83	+0.58	38
7	10	o	Erin Jackson	United States	37.85	+0.60	36
8	4	o	Carolina Hiller-Donnelly	Canada	37.86	+0.61	34
9	8	o	Martyna Baran	Poland	37.89	+0.64	32
10	8	i	Béatrice Lamarche	Canada	37.93	+0.68	31
11	5	i	Rio Yamada	Japan	37.95	+0.70	30
12	9	o	Serena Pergher	Italy	38.08	+0.83	29
13	2	i	Julie Nistad Samsonsen	Norway	38.15	+0.90	28
14	5	o	Tian Ruining	China	38.17	+0.92	27
15	6	i	Kim Min-sun	South Korea	38.21	+0.96	26
16	2	o	Sofia Thorup	Denmark	38.41	+1.16	25
17	1	i	Jung Hui-dan	South Korea	38.43	+1.18	24
18	4	i	Kurumi Inagawa	Japan	38.52	+1.27	23
19	3	i	Wang Jingziqian	China	38.89	+1.64	22
20	3	o	Brooklyn McDougall	Canada	39.03	+1.78	21

==== 1000 m ====
The race started on 24 January 2026 at 14:38.

Rank	Pair	Lane	Name	Country	Time	Diff	WC Points
1st place, gold medalist(s)	10	o	Jutta Leerdam	Netherlands	1:12.74; TR		60
2nd place, silver medalist(s)	8	i	Miho Takagi	Japan	1:13.43	+0.69	54
3rd place, bronze medalist(s)	10	i	Femke Kok	Netherlands	1:13.67	+0.93	48
4	9	i	Brittany Bowe	United States	1:14.02	+1.28	43
5	5	i	Erin Jackson	United States	1:14.32	+1.58	40
6	9	o	Béatrice Lamarche	Canada	1:14.74	+2.00	38
7	7	i	Rio Yamada	Japan	1:14.92	+2.18	36
8	8	o	Marrit Fledderus	Netherlands	1:15.04	+2.30	34
9	6	i	Ellia Smeding	United Kingdom	1:15.06	+2.32	32
10	5	o	Sofia Thorup	Denmark	1:15.43	+2.69	31
11	4	o	Han Mei	China	1:15.47	+2.73	30
12	7	o	Yin Qi	China	1:15.56	+2.82	29
13	6	o	Karolina Bosiek	Poland	1:15.64	+2.90	28
14	1	o	Anna Ostlender	Germany	1:15.68	+2.94	27
15	4	i	Elizaveta Golubeva	Kazakhstan	1:16.25	+3.51	26
16	2	i	Lea Sophie Scholz	Germany	1:16.35	+3.61	25
17	3	o	Natalia Czerwonka	Poland	1:16.45	+3.71	24
18	2	o	Kaitlyn McGregor	Switzerland	1:16.53	+3.79	23
19	3	i	Isabelle van Elst	Belgium	1:16.53	+3.79	22
20	1	i	Iga Wojtasik	Poland	1:17.23	+4.49	21

==== 1500 m ====
The race started on 23 January 2026 at 19:38.

Rank	Pair	Lane	Name	Country	Time	Diff	WC Points
1st place, gold medalist(s)	9	i	Joy Beune	Netherlands	1:53.34		60
2nd place, silver medalist(s)	10	i	Miho Takagi	Japan	1:53.59	+0.25	54
3rd place, bronze medalist(s)	8	o	Ragne Wiklund	Norway	1:53.72	+0.38	48
4	6	i	Han Mei	China	1:54.36	+1.02	43
5	10	o	Brittany Bowe	United States	1:54.57	+1.23	40
6	6	o	Kaitlyn McGregor	Switzerland	1:54.62	+1.28	38
7	9	o	Antoinette Rijpma-de Jong	Netherlands	1:54.92	+1.58	36
8	3	o	Marijke Groenewoud	Netherlands	1:55.07	+1.73	34
9	8	i	Nadezhda Morozova	Kazakhstan	1:55.14	+1.80	32
10	7	o	Ivanie Blondin	Canada	1:55.25	+1.91	31
11	7	i	Nikola Zdráhalová	Czech Republic	1:55.47	+2.13	30
12	5	o	Elizaveta Golubeva	Kazakhstan	1:55.76	+2.42	29
13	3	i	Greta Myers	United States	1:56.68	+3.34	28
14	1	i	Li Jiaxuan	China	1:56.88	+3.54	27
15	5	i	Isabelle van Elst	Belgium	1:57.03	+3.69	26
16	1	o	Momoka Horikawa	Japan	1:57.12	+3.78	25
17	2	o	Isabelle Weidemann	Canada	1:57.31	+3.97	24
18	2	i	Natalia Czerwonka	Poland	1:57.99	+4.65	23
19	4	i	Ayano Sato	Japan	1:59.50	+6.16	22
	4	o	Yang Binyu	China	DQ		

==== 3000 m ====
The race started on 24 January 2026 at 16:04.

Rank	Pair	Lane	Name	Country	Time	Diff	WC Points
1st place, gold medalist(s)	7	i	Ragne Wiklund	Norway	3:54.74; TR; PB		60
2nd place, silver medalist(s)	8	o	Joy Beune	Netherlands	3:56.96	+2.22	54
3rd place, bronze medalist(s)	7	o	Valérie Maltais	Canada	3:59.92	+5.18	48
4	4	i	Nadezhda Morozova	Kazakhstan	4:00.19	+5.45	43
5	5	o	Sandrine Tas	Belgium	4:00.92	+6.18	40
6	5	i	Martina Sáblíková	Czech Republic	4:01.98	+7.24	38
7	6	i	Isabelle Weidemann	Canada	4:02.11	+7.37	36
8	6	o	Marijke Groenewoud	Netherlands	4:02.95	+8.21	34
9	8	i	Francesca Lollobrigida	Italy	4:03.63	+8.89	32
10	4	o	Ivanie Blondin	Canada	4:03.91	+9.17	31
11	2	o	Momoka Horikawa	Japan	4:04.60	+9.86	30
12	1	o	Jeannine Rosner	Austria	4:04.67	+9.93	29
13	2	i	Josie Hofmann	Germany	4:05.08	+10.34	28
14	1	i	Violette Braun	France	4:09.01	+14.27	27
15	3	o	Tai Zhien	China	4:09.56	+14.82	26
16	3	i	Bente Kerkhoff	Netherlands	4:09.66	+14.92	25

==== Mass start ====
The race started on 25 January 2026 at 15:21.

Rank	Name	Country	Points	Time	WC Points
1st place, gold medalist(s)	Marijke Groenewoud	Netherlands	60	8:38.32	60
2nd place, silver medalist(s)	Valérie Maltais	Canada	40	8:38.77	54
3rd place, bronze medalist(s)	Mia Manganello	United States	20	8:39.29	48
4	Ivanie Blondin	Canada	10	8:39.30	43
5	Jeannine Rosner	Austria	6	8:39.51	40
6	Ramona Härdi	Switzerland	4	8:54.33	38
7	Sofia Thorup	Denmark	3	8:39.55	36
8	Josie Hofmann	Germany	3	8:42.50	34
9	Josephine Schlörb	Germany	3	8:51.00	32
10	Linda Rossi	Italy	3	8:53.07	31
11	Greta Myers	United States	2	8:42.60	30
12	Kaitlyn McGregor	Switzerland	2	8:54.54	29
13	Fran Vanhoutte	Belgium	1	8:52.32	28
14	Yang Binyu	China		8:40.19	27
15	Adake Ahenaer	China		8:40.56	26
16	Bente Kerkhoff	Netherlands		8:41.36	25
17	Sandrine Tas	Belgium		8:42.34	24
18	Julia Nizan	France		8:49.25	23
19	Elizaveta Golubeva	Kazakhstan		8:53.36	22
20	Jéssica Carolina Santos Rodrigues	Portugal		8:55.73	21

==== Team sprint ====
The race started on 25 January 2026 at 16:20.

Rank	Pair	Lane	Country	Time	Diff	WC Points
1st place, gold medalist(s)	3	s	Netherlands; Marrit Fledderus; Naomi Verkerk; Isabel Grevelt	1:25.52		60
2nd place, silver medalist(s)	2	s	Canada; Carolina Hiller-Donnelly; Béatrice Lamarche; Ivanie Blondin	1:26.84	+1.32	54
3rd place, bronze medalist(s)	1	s	Germany; Katja Franzen; Josephine Heimerl; Anna Ostlender	1:28.45	+2.93	48
4	3	c	United States; McKenzie Browne; Sarah Warren; Chrysta Rands-Evans	1:30.05	+4.53	43
5	2	c	Spain; Oliegtnis Mercado Rodríguez; Ona Rodriguez Cornejo; Sara Cabrera	1:32.87	+7.35	40

== Division B result summary ==
=== Men's events ===
Event	First place	Time	Second place	Time	Third place	Time	Report
500 m (1)	Piotr Michalski; Poland	34.59	Anders Johnson; Canada	34.66	Chung Jae-woong; South Korea	34.67	
500 m (2)	Zach Stoppelmoor; United States	34.83	Kayo Vos; Netherlands	34.93	Merijn Scheperkamp; Netherlands	34.97	
1000 m	Zach Stoppelmoor; United States	1:08.68	Anders Johnson; Canada	1:08.79	Bjørn Magnussen; Norway	1:08.79	
1500 m	Francesco Betti; Italy	1:45.46	Conor McDermott-Mostowy; United States	1:45.47	Stefan Emele; Germany	1:45.47	
5000 m	Riccardo Lorello; Italy	6:09.33	Marcel Bosker; Netherlands	6:11.67	Stijn van de Bunt; Netherlands	6:11.96	
Mass start^{A}	Daniel Hall; Canada	62	Miguel Bravo; Portugal	41	Stijn Van De Bunt; Netherlands	24	

^{A} In mass start, race points are accumulated during the race based on results of the intermediate sprints and the final sprint. The skater with most race points is the winner.

=== Women's events ===
Event	First place	Time	Second place	Time	Third place	Time	Report
500 m (1)	Isabel Grevelt; Netherlands	37.83	Suzanne Schulting; Netherlands	37.95	Julie Nistad Samsonsen; Norway	38.15	
500 m (2)	Yu Shihui; China	38.18; PB	Naomi Verkerk; Netherlands	38.22	Karolina Bosiek; Poland	38.48	
1000 m	Suzanne Schulting; Netherlands	1:15.21	Naomi Verkerk; Netherlands	1:16.05	Kristina Silaeva; Kazakhstan	1:16.24	
1500 m	Arina Ilyachshenko; Kazakhstan	1:55.95; PB	Sofia Thorup; Denmark	1:56.98	Chloé Hoogendoorn; Netherlands	1:57.00	
3000 m	Maria Jaisch; Germany	3:58.98; PB	Merel Conijn; Netherlands	3:59.97	Kaitlyn McGregor; Switzerland	4:02.83	
Mass start^{A}	Julia Nizan; France	60	Adake Ahenaer; China	42	Sofia Thorup; Denmark	20	

^{A} In mass start, race points are accumulated during the race based on results of the intermediate sprints and the final sprint. The skater with most race points is the winner.
