= 2025–26 ISU Speed Skating World Cup – World Cup 4 =

Ice skating competition in Hamar, Norway

2025–26 ISU Speed Skating World Cup 4
- Venue: Vikingskipet; Hamar; Norway
- Dates: 12 — 14 December 2025

The fourth competition weekend of the 2025–26 ISU Speed Skating World Cup was held at the Vikingskipet in Hamar, Norway, from Friday, 12 December, until Sunday, 14 December 2025. It is the fourth of four events that determine qualification for speed skating at the 2026 Winter Olympics.

== Medal summary ==
=== Men's events ===
Event	Gold	Time	Silver	Time	Bronze	Time	Report
500 m (1)	Jordan Stolz; United States	33.97; TR	Jenning de Boo; Netherlands	34.21	Damian Żurek; Poland	34.42	
500 m (2)	Jordan Stolz; United States	34.14	Damian Żurek; Poland	34.14	Yuta Hirose; Japan	34.44	
1000 m	Jordan Stolz; United States	1:07.63; TR	Damian Żurek; Poland	1:08.21	Kjeld Nuis; Netherlands	1:08.25	
1500 m	Jordan Stolz; United States	1:44.16; TR	Kjeld Nuis; Netherlands	1:44.95	Ning Zhongyan; China	1:45.11	
5000 m	Metoděj Jílek; Czech Republic	6:07.58; TR	Timothy Loubineaud; France	6:12.29	Sander Eitrem; Norway	6:13.49	
Mass start^{A}	Jordan Stolz; United States	60	Bart Swings; Belgium	41	Andrea Giovannini; Italy	20	
Team pursuit	United States; Casey Dawson; Emery Lehman; Ethan Cepuran	3:40.28	Italy; Davide Ghiotto; Michele Malfatti; Andrea Giovannini	3:42.60	Netherlands; Marcel Bosker; Chris Huizinga; Beau Snellink	3:43.04	

^{A} In mass start, race points are accumulated during the race based on results of the intermediate sprints and the final sprint. The skater with most race points is the winner.

=== Women's events ===
Event	Gold	Time	Silver	Time	Bronze	Time	Report
500 m (1)	Femke Kok; Netherlands	37.05; TR	Kaja Ziomek-Nogal; Poland	37.65	Yukino Yoshida; Japan	37.75	
500 m (2)	Yukino Yoshida; Japan	37.65	Kaja Ziomek-Nogal; Poland	37.83	Kim Min-sun; South Korea	37.83	
1000 m	Miho Takagi; Japan	1:14.39	Femke Kok; Netherlands	1:14.73	Marrit Fledderus; Netherlands	1:15.39	
1500 m	Miho Takagi; Japan	1:54.95	Nadezhda Morozova; Kazakhstan	1:54.98	Ragne Wiklund; Norway	1:55.18	
3000 m	Marijke Groenewoud; Netherlands	4:00.95	Isabelle Weidemann; Canada	4:01.30	Ragne Wiklund; Norway	4:01.41	
Mass start^{A}	Bente Kerkhoff; Netherlands	64	Marijke Groenewoud; Netherlands	40	Ivanie Blondin; Canada	20	
Team pursuit	Canada; Isabelle Weidemann; Valérie Maltais; Ivanie Blondin	2:57.20	United States; Brittany Bowe; Mia Manganello; Giorgia Birkeland	2:57.29	Japan; Miho Takagi; Sumire Kikuchi; Ayano Sato	2:58.62	

^{A} In mass start, race points are accumulated during the race based on results of the intermediate sprints and the final sprint. The skater with most race points is the winner.

=== Mixed events ===
Event	Gold	Time	Silver	Time	Bronze	Time	Report
Mixed gender relay	Poland; Natalia Jabrzyk; Marcin Bachanek	2:57.58	Norway; Julie Nistad Samonsen; Bjørn Magnussen	2:57.63	Austria; Jeannine Rosner; Gabriel Odor	2:57.70	

== Medal count ==
* Host nation (Norway)

Rank	Nation	Gold	Silver	Bronze	Total
1	United States	6	1	0	7
2	Netherlands	3	4	3	10
3	Japan	3	0	3	6
4	Poland	1	4	1	6
5	Canada	1	1	1	3
6	Czech Republic	1	0	0	1
7	Norway*	0	1	3	4
8	Italy	0	1	1	2
9	Belgium	0	1	0	1
9	France	0	1	0	1
9	Kazakhstan	0	1	0	1
12	Austria	0	0	1	1
12	China	0	0	1	1
12	South Korea	0	0	1	1
Totals (14 entries)		15	15	15	45

== Results ==
=== Men's events ===
==== 1st 500 m ====
The race started on 12 December 2025 at 19:50.

Rank	Pair	Lane	Name	Country	Time	Diff	WC Points
1st place, gold medalist(s)	8	o	Jordan Stolz	United States	33.97; TR		60
2nd place, silver medalist(s)	8	i	Jenning de Boo	Netherlands	34.21	+0.24	54
3rd place, bronze medalist(s)	9	i	Damian Żurek	Poland	34.42	+0.45	48
4	9	o	Wataru Morishige	Japan	34.49	+0.52	43
5	4	o	Yuta Hirose	Japan	34.51	+0.54	40
6	6	i	Bjørn Magnussen	Norway	34.59	+0.62	38
7	5	i	Sebas Diniz	Netherlands	34.61	+0.64	36
8	5	o	Marten Liiv	Estonia	34.69	+0.72	34
9	6	o	Cooper McLeod	United States	34.71	+0.74	32
10	7	o	Yevgeniy Koshkin	Kazakhstan	34.71	+0.74	31
11	2	o	Katsuhiro Kuratsubo	Japan	34.73	+0.76	30
12	3	o	Tatsuya Shinhama	Japan	34.77	+0.80	29
13	4	i	Lian Ziwen	China	34.83	+0.86	28
14	1	i	Merijn Scheperkamp	Netherlands	34.91	+0.94	27
15	1	o	Liu Ze	China	34.93	+0.96	26
16	10	o	Laurent Dubreuil	Canada	35.07	+1.10	25
17	2	i	Cedrick Brunet	Canada	35.11	+1.14	24
18	7	i	Xue Zhiwen	China	35.24	+1.27	23
19	10	i	Gao Tingyu	China	48.10	+14.13	22
20	3	i	Joep Wennemars	Netherlands	DNF		21

==== 2nd 500 m ====
The race started on 14 December 2025 at 14:44.

Rank	Pair	Lane	Name	Country	Time	Diff	WC Points
1st place, gold medalist(s)	9	i	Jordan Stolz	United States	34.14		60
2nd place, silver medalist(s)	9	o	Damian Żurek	Poland	34.14	+0.00	54
3rd place, bronze medalist(s)	5	o	Yuta Hirose	Japan	34.44	+0.30	48
4	6	i	Sebas Diniz	Netherlands	34.49	+0.35	43
5	4	o	Tatsuya Shinhama	Japan	34.51	+0.37	40
6	8	o	Yevgeniy Koshkin	Kazakhstan	34.56	+0.42	38
7	3	o	Katsuhiro Kuratsubo	Japan	34.62	+0.48	36
8	8	i	Bjørn Magnussen	Norway	34.69	+0.55	34
9	5	i	Marten Liiv	Estonia	34.73	+0.59	32
10	1	i	Stefan Westenbroek	Netherlands	34.74	+0.60	31
11	7	o	Cooper McLeod	United States	34.78	+0.64	30
12	2	i	Koo Kyung-min	South Korea	34.80	+0.66	29
13	10	o	Wataru Morishige	Japan	34.80	+0.66	28
14	2	o	Piotr Michalski	Poland	34.85	+0.71	27
15	4	i	Lian Ziwen	China	34.87	+0.73	26
16	1	o	Chung Jae-woong	South Korea	35.03	+0.89	25
17	7	i	Gao Tingyu	China	39.85	+5.71	24
18	6	o	Xue Zhiwen	China	40.47	+6.33	23
19	3	i	Cedrick Brunet	Canada	1:01.99	+27.85	22
20	10	i	Laurent Dubreuil	Canada	DNF		21

==== 1000 m ====
The race started on 13 December 2025 at 14:33.

Rank	Pair	Lane	Name	Country	Time	Diff	WC Points
1st place, gold medalist(s)	9	o	Jordan Stolz	United States	1:07.63; TR		60
2nd place, silver medalist(s)	8	i	Damian Żurek	Poland	1:08.21	+0.58	54
3rd place, bronze medalist(s)	3	o	Kjeld Nuis	Netherlands	1:08.25	+0.62	48
4	9	i	Jenning de Boo	Netherlands	1:08.28	+0.65	43
5	7	o	Marten Liiv	Estonia	1:08.57	+0.94	40
6	5	i	Conor McDermott-Mostowy	United States	1:08.75	+1.12	38
7	10	o	Tim Prins	Netherlands	1:08.86	+1.23	36
8	2	i	Piotr Michalski	Poland	1:08.93	+1.30	34
9	1	o	Zach Stoppelmoor	United States	1:09.11	+1.48	32
10	7	i	Cooper McLeod	United States	1:09.11	+1.48	31
11	6	i	Ryota Kojima	Japan	1:09.17	+1.54	30
12	4	o	Mathias Vosté	Belgium	1:09.23	+1.60	29
13	8	o	Finn Sonnekalb	Germany	1:09.27	+1.64	28
14	6	o	Lian Ziwen	China	1:09.30	+1.67	27
15	5	o	Taiyo Nonomura	Japan	1:09.36	+1.73	26
16	2	o	Gabriel Odor	Austria	1:09.39	+1.76	25
17	4	i	Hendrik Dombek	Germany	1:09.45	+1.82	24
18	1	i	Szymon Wojtakowski	Poland	1:09.46	+1.83	23
19	10	i	Ning Zhongyan	China	1:10.17	+2.54	22
20	3	i	Moritz Klein	Germany	1:10.25	+2.62	21

==== 1500 m ====
The race started on 12 December 2025 at 21:08.

Rank	Pair	Lane	Name	Country	Time	Diff	WC Points
1st place, gold medalist(s)	9	i	Jordan Stolz	United States	1:44.16; TR		60
2nd place, silver medalist(s)	8	i	Kjeld Nuis	Netherlands	1:44.95	+0.79	54
3rd place, bronze medalist(s)	10	o	Ning Zhongyan	China	1:45.11	+0.95	48
4	10	i	Finn Sonnekalb	Germany	1:45.51	+1.35	43
5	6	o	Sander Eitrem	Norway	1:45.52	+1.36	40
6	1	i	Metoděj Jílek	Czech Republic	1:45.59	+1.43	38
7	5	i	Gabriel Odor	Austria	1:45.63	+1.47	36
8	6	i	Daniele Di Stefano	Italy	1:45.70	+1.54	34
9	9	o	Peder Kongshaug	Norway	1:45.71	+1.55	32
10	8	o	Tim Prins	Netherlands	1:45.79	+1.63	31
11	4	o	Taiyo Nonomura	Japan	1:45.90	+1.74	30
12	3	o	Alexander Farthofer	Austria	1:46.01	+1.85	29
13	2	o	Vladimir Semirunniy	Poland	1:46.32	+2.16	28
14	7	o	Kazuya Yamada	Japan	1:46.48	+2.32	27
15	4	i	Didrik Eng Strand	Norway	1:46.55	+2.39	26
16	1	o	Ryota Kojima	Japan	1:46.60	+2.44	25
17	5	o	Wesly Dijs	Netherlands	1:46.65	+2.49	24
18	2	i	Hendrik Dombek	Germany	1:46.76	+2.60	23
19	7	i	Tijmen Snel	Netherlands	1:47.26	+3.10	22
20	3	i	Kim Min-seok	Hungary	1:48.10	+3.94	21

==== 5000 m ====
The race started on 13 December 2025 at 16:12.

Rank	Pair	Lane	Name	Country	Time	Diff	WC Points
1st place, gold medalist(s)	7	i	Metoděj Jílek	Czech Republic	6:07.58; TR		60
2nd place, silver medalist(s)	7	o	Timothy Loubineaud	France	6:12.29	+4.71	54
3rd place, bronze medalist(s)	8	o	Sander Eitrem	Norway	6:13.49	+5.91	48
4	1	o	Vladimir Semirunniy	Poland	6:13.56	+5.98	43
5	6	i	Ted-Jan Bloemen	Canada	6:14.33	+6.75	40
6	5	o	Jorrit Bergsma	Netherlands	6:15.49	+7.91	38
7	6	o	Davide Ghiotto	Italy	6:15.88	+8.30	36
8	8	i	Casey Dawson	United States	6:16.51	+8.93	34
9	1	i	Riccardo Lorello	Italy	6:16.61	+9.03	32
10	5	i	Chris Huizinga	Netherlands	6:16.89	+9.31	31
11	2	i	Fridtjof Petzold	Germany	6:17.05	+9.47	30
12	3	o	Bart Swings	Belgium	6:17.23	+9.65	29
13	3	i	Alexander Farthofer	Austria	6:17.93	+10.35	28
14	2	o	Beau Snellink	Netherlands	6:18.07	+10.49	27
15	4	i	Michele Malfatti	Italy	6:19.13	+11.55	26
16	4	o	Felix Maly	Germany	6:20.86	+13.28	25

==== Mass start ====
The race started on 14 December 2025 at 15:48.

Rank	Name	Country	Points	Time	WC Points
1st place, gold medalist(s)	Jordan Stolz	United States	60	7:40.18	60
2nd place, silver medalist(s)	Bart Swings	Belgium	41	7:41.10	54
3rd place, bronze medalist(s)	Andrea Giovannini	Italy	20	7:41.25	48
4	Jorrit Bergsma	Netherlands	13	7:41.39	43
5	Livio Wenger	Switzerland	6	7:41.49	40
6	Metoděj Jílek	Czech Republic	3	7:41.67	38
7	Jake Weidemann	Canada	3	7:46.13	36
8	Timothy Loubineaud	France	3	7:47.74	34
9	Fridtjof Petzold	Germany	2	7:44.14	32
10	Antoine Gélinas-Beaulieu	Canada	2	7:47.66	31
11	Ethan Cepuran	United States	2	7:55.70	30
12	Philip Due Schmidt	Denmark	1	7:49.15	29
13	Felix Maly	Germany	1	7:51.27	28
14	Gabriel Odor	Austria		7:42.59	27
15	Bart Hoolwerf	Netherlands		7:43.25	26
16	Li Yuhaochen	China		7:43.94	25
17	Mathieu Belloir	France		7:46.06	24
18	Indra Medard	Belgium		7:46.45	23
19	Viktor Hald Thorup	Denmark		7:46.79	22
20	Sigurd Holbø Dyrset	Norway		7:47.13	21
21	Chung Jae-won	South Korea		7:47.21	20
22	Yahor Damaratski	Individual Neutral Athletes		7:55.89	19
23	Vadim Yakubovskiy	Kazakhstan		7:58.73	0

==== Team pursuit ====
The race started on 14 December 2025 at 13:28.

Rank	Pair	Lane	Country	Time	Diff	WC Points
1st place, gold medalist(s)	3	c	United States; Casey Dawson; Emery Lehman; Ethan Cepuran	3:40.28		60
2nd place, silver medalist(s)	1	c	Italy; Davide Ghiotto; Michele Malfatti; Andrea Giovannini	3:42.60	+2.32	54
3rd place, bronze medalist(s)	2	s	Netherlands; Marcel Bosker; Chris Huizinga; Beau Snellink	3:43.04	+2.76	48
4	2	c	Germany; Patrick Beckert; Felix Maly; Fridjof Petzold	3:44.65	+4.37	43
5	1	s	Japan; Shomu Sasaki; Kazuya Yamada; Motonaga Arito	3:46.00	+5.72	40
6	3	s	China; Wu Yu; Ning Zhongyan; Li Wenhao	3:46.32	+6.04	38
7	4	s	France; Timothy Loubineaud; Valentin Thiebault; Germain Deschamps	3:46.60	+6.32	36
8	4	c	Norway; Sander Eitrem; Didrik Eng Strand; Sigurd Henriksen	3:48.11	+7.83	34

=== Women's events ===
==== 1st 500 m ====
The race started on 12 December 2025 at 18:30.

Rank	Pair	Lane	Name	Country	Time	Diff	WC Points
1st place, gold medalist(s)	10	i	Femke Kok	Netherlands	37.05; TR		60
2nd place, silver medalist(s)	3	o	Kaja Ziomek-Nogal	Poland	37.65	+0.60	54
3rd place, bronze medalist(s)	8	o	Yukino Yoshida	Japan	37.75	+0.70	48
4	4	i	Sophie Warmuth	Germany	37.80	+0.75	43
5	6	o	Martyna Baran	Poland	37.82	+0.77	40
6	4	o	Kim Min-sun	South Korea	37.85	+0.80	38
7	9	o	Marrit Fledderus	Netherlands	37.92	+0.87	36
8	5	o	Kristina Silaeva	Kazakhstan	38.03	+0.98	34
9	6	i	Béatrice Lamarche	Canada	38.05	+1.00	32
10	8	i	Lee Na-hyun	South Korea	38.06	+1.01	31
11	9	i	Anna Boersma	Netherlands	38.11	+1.06	30
12	7	o	Serena Pergher	Italy	38.15	+1.10	29
13	5	i	Andżelika Wójcik	Poland	38.31	+1.26	28
14	7	i	Chen Ying-chu	Chinese Taipei	38.37	+1.32	27
15	3	i	Tian Ruining	China	38.44	+1.39	26
16	1	i	Rio Yamada	Japan	38.51	+1.46	25
17	2	i	Wang Jingziqian	China	38.61	+1.56	24
18	2	o	Nikola Zdráhalová	Czech Republic	38.98	+1.93	23
19	10	o	Erin Jackson	United States	43.94	+6.89	22
20	1	o	Suzanne Schulting	Netherlands	1:34.45	+57.40	21

==== 2nd 500 m ====
The race started on 14 December 2025 at 14:16.

Rank	Pair	Lane	Name	Country	Time	Diff	WC Points
1st place, gold medalist(s)	10	o	Yukino Yoshida	Japan	37.65		60
2nd place, silver medalist(s)	6	o	Kaja Ziomek-Nogal	Poland	37.83	+0.18	54
3rd place, bronze medalist(s)	5	o	Kim Min-sun	South Korea	37.83	+0.18	48
4	8	i	Lee Na-hyun	South Korea	37.91	+0.26	43
5	7	i	Martyna Baran	Poland	37.94	+0.29	40
6	6	i	Sophie Warmuth	Germany	38.03	+0.38	38
7	10	i	Serena Pergher	Italy	38.04	+0.39	36
8	4	o	Tian Ruining	China	38.07	+0.42	34
9	1	o	Dione Voskamp	Netherlands	38.15	+0.50	32
10	3	i	Rio Yamada	Japan	38.24	+0.59	31
11	2	i	Carolina Hiller-Donnelly	Canada	38.25	+0.60	30
12	5	i	Kristina Silaeva	Kazakhstan	38.26	+0.61	29
13	4	i	Andżelika Wójcik	Poland	38.28	+0.63	28
14	9	i	Anna Boersma	Netherlands	38.34	+0.69	27
15	2	o	Brooklyn McDougall	Canada	38.36	+0.71	26
16	8	o	Chen Ying-chu	Chinese Taipei	38.38	+0.73	25
17	7	o	Béatrice Lamarche	Canada	38.39	+0.74	24
18	1	i	Sofia Thorup	Denmark	38.71	+1.06	23
19	3	o	Kurumi Inagawa	Japan	38.71	+1.06	22
20	9	o	Erin Jackson	United States	41.76	+4.11	21

==== 1000 m ====
The race started on 13 December 2025 at 14:00.

Rank	Pair	Lane	Name	Country	Time	Diff	WC Points
1st place, gold medalist(s)	6	i	Miho Takagi	Japan	1:14.39		60
2nd place, silver medalist(s)	8	o	Femke Kok	Netherlands	1:14.73	+0.34	54
3rd place, bronze medalist(s)	9	i	Marrit Fledderus	Netherlands	1:15.39	+1.00	48
4	10	o	Brittany Bowe	United States	1:15.50	+1.11	43
5	7	o	Lee Na-hyun	South Korea	1:15.99	+1.60	40
6	10	i	Rio Yamada	Japan	1:16.04	+1.65	38
7	1	i	Han Mei	China	1:16.08	+1.69	36
8	2	o	Nikola Zdráhalová	Czech Republic	1:16.13	+1.74	34
9	2	i	Nadezhda Morozova	Kazakhstan	1:16.19	+1.80	32
10	9	o	Béatrice Lamarche	Canada	1:16.35	+1.96	31
11	6	o	Yin Qi	China	1:16.35	+1.96	30
12	5	o	Kim Min-sun	South Korea	1:16.57	+2.18	29
13	5	i	Ellia Smeding	United Kingdom	1:16.66	+2.27	28
14	7	i	Elizaveta Golubeva	Kazakhstan	1:16.73	+2.34	27
15	3	i	Karolina Bosiek	Poland	1:16.78	+2.39	26
16	4	o	Alexa Scott	Canada	1:16.79	+2.40	25
17	3	o	Isabelle van Elst	Belgium	1:16.90	+2.51	24
18	1	o	Suzanne Schulting	Netherlands	1:16.94	+2.55	23
19	8	i	Isabel Grevelt	Netherlands	1:17.16	+2.77	22
20	4	i	Erin Jackson	United States	1:20.94	+6.55	21

==== 1500 m ====
The race started on 12 December 2025 at 20:29.

Rank	Pair	Lane	Name	Country	Time	Diff	WC Points
1st place, gold medalist(s)	8	o	Miho Takagi	Japan	1:54.95		60
2nd place, silver medalist(s)	6	i	Nadezhda Morozova	Kazakhstan	1:54.98	+0.03	54
3rd place, bronze medalist(s)	10	o	Ragne Wiklund	Norway	1:55.18	+0.23	48
4	7	i	Nikola Zdráhalová	Czech Republic	1:55.79	+0.84	43
5	8	i	Brittany Bowe	United States	1:55.98	+1.03	40
6	3	i	Valérie Maltais	Canada	1:56.27	+1.32	38
7	10	i	Antoinette Rijpma-de Jong	Netherlands	1:56.56	+1.61	36
8	4	o	Elizaveta Golubeva	Kazakhstan	1:56.84	+1.89	34
9	9	o	Melissa Wijfje	Netherlands	1:56.89	+1.94	32
10	9	i	Ivanie Blondin	Canada	1:57.49	+2.54	31
11	7	o	Han Mei	China	1:57.55	+2.60	30
12	6	o	Kaitlyn McGregor	Switzerland	1:57.58	+2.63	29
13	2	o	Yang Binyu	China	1:57.81	+2.86	28
14	5	i	Isabelle van Elst	Belgium	1:57.88	+2.93	27
15	5	o	Ayano Sato	Japan	1:58.21	+3.26	26
16	1	i	Natalia Czerwonka	Poland	1:58.82	+3.87	25
17	3	o	Greta Myers	United States	1:58.86	+3.91	24
18	1	o	Alexandra Sayutina	Individual Neutral Athletes	1:59.48	+4.53	23
19	2	i	Zofia Braun	Poland	1:59.97	+5.02	22
20	4	i	Francesca Lollobrigida	Italy	2:00.90	+5.95	21

==== 3000 m ====
The race started on 13 December 2025 at 15:15.

Rank	Pair	Lane	Name	Country	Time	Diff	WC Points
1st place, gold medalist(s)	4	o	Marijke Groenewoud	Netherlands	4:00.95		60
2nd place, silver medalist(s)	6	i	Isabelle Weidemann	Canada	4:01.30	+0.35	54
3rd place, bronze medalist(s)	6	o	Ragne Wiklund	Norway	4:01.41	+0.46	48
4	7	o	Valérie Maltais	Canada	4:03.62	+2.67	43
5	5	i	Nadezhda Morozova	Kazakhstan	4:04.51	+3.56	40
6	3	i	Sanne in 't Hof	Netherlands	4:04.64	+3.69	38
7	8	o	Martina Sáblíková	Czech Republic	4:05.74	+4.79	36
8	2	i	Marina Zueva	Individual Neutral Athletes	4:06.31	+5.36	34
9	8	i	Sandrine Tas	Belgium	4:06.44	+5.49	32
10	4	i	Ivanie Blondin	Canada	4:07.08	+6.13	31
11	7	i	Francesca Lollobrigida	Italy	4:07.58	+6.63	30
12	5	o	Bente Kerkhoff	Netherlands	4:08.15	+7.20	29
13	2	o	Josie Hofmann	Germany	4:08.94	+7.99	28
14	1	o	Maira Jasch	Germany	4:09.76	+8.81	27
15	1	i	Momoka Horikawa	Japan	4:10.84	+9.89	26
16	3	o	Tai Zhien	China	4:12.89	+11.94	25

==== Mass start ====
The race started on 14 December 2025 at 15:27.

Rank	Name	Country	Points	Time	WC Points
1st place, gold medalist(s)	Bente Kerkhoff	Netherlands	64	8:23.19	60
2nd place, silver medalist(s)	Marijke Groenewoud	Netherlands	40	8:24.28	54
3rd place, bronze medalist(s)	Ivanie Blondin	Canada	20	8:24.47	38
4	Mia Manganello	United States	10	8:24.80	43
5	Valérie Maltais	Canada	6	8:24.89	40
6	Park Ji-woo	South Korea	3	8:24.92	38
7	Francesca Lollobrigida	Italy	3	8:25.46	36
8	Kaitlyn McGregor	Switzerland	3	8:28.42	34
9	Ramona Härdi	Switzerland	2	8:26.32	32
10	Elizaveta Golubeva	Kazakhstan	2	8:26.55	31
11	Jeannine Rosner	Austria	2	8:31.28	30
12	Aurora Grinden Løvås	Norway	2	8:32.12	29
13	Fran Vanhoutte	Belgium		8:25.45	28
14	Hou Jundan	China		8:25.49	27
15	Anastasiia Semenova	Individual Neutral Athletes		8:25.83	26
16	Greta Myers	United States		8:26.40	25
17	Momoka Horikawa	Japan		8:26.56	24
18	Lim Lee-won	South Korea		8:27.45	23
19	Josephine Schlörb	Germany		8:27.49	22
20	Jéssica Carolina Santos Rodrigues	Portugal		8:27.75	21
21	Marina Zueva	Individual Neutral Athletes		8:29.64	20
22	Ayano Sato	Japan		8:44.29	19
23	Yang Binyu	China		8:45.33	18

==== Team pursuit ====
The race started on 14 December 2025 at 13:00.

Rank	Pair	Lane	Country	Time	Diff	WC Points
1st place, gold medalist(s)	3	c	Canada; Isabelle Weidemann; Valérie Maltais; Ivanie Blondin	2:57.20		60
2nd place, silver medalist(s)	3	s	United States; Brittany Bowe; Mia Manganello; Giorgia Birkeland	2:57.29	+0.09	54
3rd place, bronze medalist(s)	4	c	Japan; Miho Takagi; Sumire Kikuchi; Ayano Sato	2:58.62	+1.42	48
4	1	c	China; Yang Binyu; Li Jiaxuan; Han Mei	3:00.71	+3.51	43
5	1	s	Norway; Aurora Grinden Løvås; Ragne Wiklund; Marte Bjerkreim Furnee	3:01.19	+3.99	40
6	2	c	Kazakhstan; Nadezhda Morozova; Arina Ilyachsehenko; Elizaveta Golubeva	3:02.07	+4.87	38
7	2	s	Germany; Lea Sophie Scholz; Josephine Schlörb; Maira Jasch	3:02.86	+5.66	36
8	4	s	Netherlands; Antoinette Rijpma-de Jong; Kim Talsme; Marijke Groenewoud	DNF		34

=== Mixed events ===
==== Mixed relay ====
The race started on 14 December 2025 at 16:18.

Rank	Heat	Country	Time	Diff	WC Points
1st place, gold medalist(s)	2	Poland; Natalia Jabrzyk; Marcin Bachanek	2:57.58		60
2nd place, silver medalist(s)	1	Norway; Julie Nistad Samonsen; Bjørn Magnussen	2:57.63	+0.05	54
3rd place, bronze medalist(s)	1	Austria; Jeannine Rosner; Gabriel Odor	2:57.70	+0.12	48
4	2	Germany; Anna Ostlender; Moritz Klein	2:58.82	+1.24	43
5	2	China; Jin Wenjing; Ayitinama Yeerhanati	2:59.04	+1.46	40
6	1	Hungary; Abigél Mercs; Bálint Bödei	2:59.72	+2.14	38
7	2	Kazakhstan; Alena Lifatova; Aleksandr Klenko	3:01.92	+4.34	36
8	1	Czech Republic; Lucie Korvasová; Jakub Kočí	3:08.36	+10.78	34

== Division B result summary ==
=== Men's events ===
Event	First place	Time	Second place	Time	Third place	Time	Report
500 m (1)	Piotr Michalski; Poland	34.84	Stefan Westenbroek; Netherlands	34.87	Chung Jae-woong; South Korea	34.94	
500 m (2)	Liu Ze; China	34.75	Nil Llop Izquierdo; Spain	34.92	Jeffrey Rosanelli; Italy	34.93	
1000 m	Serge Yoro; Netherlands	1:08.91	Merijn Scheperkamp; Netherlands	1:09.09	David La Rue; Canada	1:09.38	
1500 m	Jake Weidemann; Canada	1:46.32	Li Wenhao; China	1:46.52	Valentin Thiebault; France	1:46.69	
5000 m	Viktor Hald Thorup; Denmark	6:14.32	Sigurd Henriksen; Norway	6:16.29	Kars Jansman; Netherlands	6:18.22	
Mass start^{A}	Vadim Yakubovskiy; Kazakhstan	68	Philip Due Schmidt; Denmark	42	Li Yuhaochen; China	20	
Team pursuit	Canada; Daniel Hall; Antoine Gélinas-Beaulieu; Jake Weidemann	3:42.49	Switzerland; Thibault Métraux; Flavio Gross; Livio Wenger	3:48.01	Poland; Vladimir Semirunniy; Szymon Palka; Mateusz Śliwka	3:49.01	

^{A} In mass start, race points are accumulated during the race based on results of the intermediate sprints and the final sprint. The skater with most race points is the winner.

=== Women's events ===
Event	First place	Time	Second place	Time	Third place	Time	Report
500 m (1)	Carolina Hiller-Donnelly; Canada	38.38	Sofia Thorup; Denmark	38.55	Isabel Grevelt; Netherlands	38.57	
500 m (2)	Wang Jingziqian; China	38.38	Jung Hui-dan; South Korea	38.52	Pei Chong; China	38.59	
1000 m	Sofia Thorup; Denmark	1:16.55	Meike Veen; Netherlands	1:17.16	Natalia Czerwonka; Poland	1:17.18	
1500 m	Meike Veen; Netherlands	1:57.55	Isabelle Weidemann; Canada	1:57.72	Yin Qi; China	1:57.91	
3000 m	Kseniia Korzhova; Individual Neutral Athletes	4:04.48	Violette Braun; France	4:05.57	Jeannine Rosner; Austria	4:06.47	
Mass start^{A}	Anastasiia Semenova; Individual Neutral Athletes	63	Marina Zueva; Individual Neutral Athletes	46	Lim Lee-won; South Korea	20	
Team pursuit	Belgium; Fran Vanhoutte; Isabelle van Elst; Sandrine Tas	3:03.81	Poland; Natalia Czerwonka; Magdalena Czyszczoń; Olga Piotrowska	3:05.84	Switzerland; Nadja Wenger; Kaitlyn McGregor; Ramona Härdi	3:11.31	

^{A} In mass start, race points are accumulated during the race based on results of the intermediate sprints and the final sprint. The skater with most race points is the winner.
