= Speed skating at the 2026 Winter Olympics – Men's 10,000 metres =

Men's 10,000 metres at the XXV Olympic Winter Games
- Speed skating
- Venue: Milano Speed Skating Stadium, Milan
- Date: 13 February 2026
- Competitors: 12 from 9 nations
- Winning time: 12:33.43

Medalists
1st place, gold medalist(s)		Metoděj Jílek	Czech Republic
2nd place, silver medalist(s)		Vladimir Semirunniy	Poland
3rd place, bronze medalist(s)		Jorrit Bergsma	Netherlands

The men's 10,000 m competition in speed skating at the 2026 Winter Olympics will be held on 13 February, at the Milano Speed Skating Stadium in Milan. Metoděj Jílek of the Czech Republic won the event, this was his first Olympic gold. Vladimir Semirunniy of Poland won silver, his first Olympic medal. Jorrit Bergsma of the Netherlands, the 2014 champion on this distance, skating at the age of 40, won bronze.

== Background ==
The 2022 champion, Nils van der Poel, retired from competitions. The silver medalist, Patrick Roest, did not qualify for the Olympics. The bronze medalist, Davide Ghiotto, qualified for the event. Before the Olympics, Metoděj Jílek was leading the long-distance standings of the 2025–26 ISU Speed Skating World Cup. Ghiotto was the 10,000 metres 2025 world champion and the world record holder.

== Summary ==
In pair 3, Semirunniy and Stijn van de Bunt took the two top positions. In pair 4, Bergsma and Giotto originally skated faster than Semirunniy, but eventually ended up in provisional 2nd and 4th positions, respectively. Jílek in pair 5 was 5.7 seconds faster than Semirunniy, moving van de Bunt off the podium. In pair 6, the last pair, Sander Eitrem, who a few days previously won the gold medal n 5000 m, and Timothy Loubineaud, were initially skating faster than Jílek, but none could keep up. Loubineaud finished in the 4th position, and Eitrem in the 7th, keeping the podium intact.

== Records ==
Prior to this competition, the existing world, Olympic and track records were as follows.

World record	Davide Ghiotto (ITA)	12:25.69	Calgary, Canada	25 January 2025
Olympic record	Nils van der Poel (SWE)	12:30.74	Beijing, China	11 February 2022
Track record				

== Results ==
Rank	Pair	Lane	Name	Country	Time	Time behind	Notes
1st place, gold medalist(s)	5	I	Metoděj Jílek	Czech Republic	12:33.43	—	
2nd place, silver medalist(s)	3	I	Vladimir Semirunniy	Poland	12:39.08	+ 5.65	
3rd place, bronze medalist(s)	4	I	Jorrit Bergsma	Netherlands	12:40.48	+7.05	
4	6	O	Timothy Loubineaud	France	12:44.20	+10.77	
5	3	O	Stijn van de Bunt	Netherlands	12:45.75	+12.32	
6	4	O	Davide Ghiotto	Italy	12:46.72	+13.29	
7	6	I	Sander Eitrem	Norway	12:47.11	+13.68	
8	1	I	Riccardo Lorello	Italy	12.56.22	+22.79	
9	5	O	Ted-Jan Bloemen	Canada	13:00.01	+26.58	
10	2	I	Bart Swings	Belgium	13:05.60	+32.17	
11	2	O	Sigurd Henriksen	Norway	13:27.29	+53.86	
–	1	O	Viktor Hald Thorup	Denmark	DNF		
–			Casey Dawson	United States	WDR		
