= 2024–25 ISU Speed Skating World Cup – World Cup 3 =

Ice skating competition in Calgary, Canada

2024–25 ISU Speed Skating World Cup 3
- Venue: Olympic Oval; Calgary; Canada
- Dates: 24 — 26 January 2025

The third competition weekend of the 2024–25 ISU Speed Skating World Cup was held at the Olympic Oval in Calgary, Canada, from Friday, 24 January, until Sunday, 26 January 2025.

Davide Ghiotto set a new world record at the 10,000 meter event. Team USA set a new world record at the team sprint event for men.

== Medal summary ==
=== Men's events ===
Event	Gold	Time	Silver	Time	Bronze	Time	Report
500 m	Jordan Stolz; United States	33.85	Jenning de Boo; Netherlands	33.87	Damian Żurek; Poland	34.07	
1000 m	Jordan Stolz; United States	1:05.90; TR	Jenning de Boo; Netherlands	1:06.05	Kjeld Nuis; Netherlands	1:06.73	
1500 m	Jordan Stolz; United States	1:41.22; TR	Ning Zhongyan; China	1:42.24	Peder Kongshaug; Norway	1:42.25	
10000 m	Davide Ghiotto; Italy	12:25.69; WR; TR	Metoděj Jílek; Czech Republic	12:37.81	Sander Eitrem; Norway	12:38.04	
Mass start^{A}	Timothy Loubineaud; France	67	Fridtjof Petzold; Germany	47	Indra Medard; Belgium	24	
Team sprint	United States; Austin Kleba; Cooper Mcleod; Zach Stoppelmoor	1:16.98; WR; TR	Netherlands; Stefan Westenbroek; Jenning de Boo; Tim Prins	1:17.54	Poland; Marek Kania; Piotr Michalski; Damian Zurek	1:17.58	

^{A} In mass start, race points are accumulated during the race based on results of the intermediate sprints and the final sprint. The skater with most race points is the winner.

=== Women's events ===
Event	Gold	Time	Silver	Time	Bronze	Time	Report
500 m	Femke Kok; Netherlands	37.01	Andżelika Wójcik; Poland	37.16	Kurumi Inagawa; Japan	37.24	
1000 m	Miho Takagi; Japan	1:13.10	Jutta Leerdam; Netherlands	1:13.46	Han Mei; China	1:13.58	
1500 m	Joy Beune; Netherlands	1:51.72	Miho Takagi; Japan	1:51.85	Antoinette Rijpma-de Jong; Netherlands	1:52.17	
5000 m	Joy Beune; Netherlands	6:45.76	Merel Conijn; Netherlands	6:47.44	Martina Sáblíková; Czech Republic	6:49.01	
Mass start^{A}	Greta Myers; United States	66	Jin Wenjing; China	43	Michelle Uhrig; Germany	25	
Team sprint	Canada; Caroline Hiller; Béatrice Lamarche; Ivanie Blondin	1:24.90	Poland; Andżelika Wójcik; Kaja Ziomek-Nogal; Karolina Bosiek	1:26.02	Kazakhstan; Kristina Silaeva; Darya Vazhenina; Nadezhda Morozova	1:26.36	

^{A} In mass start, race points are accumulated during the race based on results of the intermediate sprints and the final sprint. The skater with most race points is the winner.

== Results ==
=== Men's events ===
==== 500 m ====
The race started on 26 January 2025 at 13:28.

Rank	Pair	Lane	Name	Country	Time	Diff
1st place, gold medalist(s)	8	i	Jordan Stolz	United States	33.85	
2nd place, silver medalist(s)	10	i	Jenning de Boo	Netherlands	33.87	+0.02
3rd place, bronze medalist(s)	4	i	Damian Żurek	Poland	34.07	+0.22
4	5	i	Marek Kania	Poland	34.12	+0.27
5	7	i	Laurent Dubreuil	Canada	34.14	+0.29
6	10	o	Cooper McLeod	United States	34.15	+0.30
7	9	i	Kim Jun-ho	South Korea	34.17	+0.32
8	7	o	Marten Liiv	Estonia	34.31	+0.46
9	9	o	Tatsuya Shinhama	Japan	34.37	+0.52
10	5	o	Sebastian Diniz	Netherlands	34.41	+0.56
11	6	o	Wataru Morishige	Japan	34.41	+0.56
12	4	o	Bjørn Magnussen	Norway	34.43	+0.58
13	3	i	Gao Tingyu	China	34.48	+0.63
14	6	i	Stefan Westenbroek	Netherlands	34.50	+0.65
15	8	o	Merijn Scheperkamp	Netherlands	34.53	+0.68
16	2	o	Cho Sanghyeok	South Korea	34.55	+0.70
17	2	i	Zach Stoppelmoor	United States	34.65	+0.80
18	1	i	Altaj Zjardembekuly	Kazakhstan	34.73	+0.88
19	1	o	Lian Ziwen	China	35.14	+1.29
20	3	o	Katsuhiro Kuratsubo	Japan	1:06.65	+32.80

==== 1000 m ====
The race started on 25 January 2025 at 15:45.

Rank	Pair	Lane	Name	Country	Time	Diff
1st place, gold medalist(s)	10	i	Jordan Stolz	United States	1:05.90; TR	
2nd place, silver medalist(s)	8	o	Jenning de Boo	Netherlands	1:06.05	+0.15
3rd place, bronze medalist(s)	10	o	Kjeld Nuis	Netherlands	1:06.73	+0.83
4	7	i	Tim Prins	Netherlands	1:06.80	+0.90
5	9	o	Ning Zhongyan	China	1:06.98	+1.08
6	8	i	Marten Liiv	Estonia	1:07.14	+1.24
7	6	i	Tatsuya Shinhama	Japan	1:07.16	+1.26
8	3	i	Damian Żurek	Poland	1:07.19	+1.29
9	7	o	Ryota Kojima	Japan	1:07.64	+1.74
10	3	o	Kim Min-seok	Hungary	1:07.64	+1.74
11	4	i	Laurent Dubreuil	Canada	1:07.73	+1.83
12	9	i	Cooper McLeod	United States	1:07.75	+1.85
13	6	o	Taiyo Nonomura	Japan	1:07.79	+1.89
14	1	o	Lian Ziwen	China	1:08.13	+2.23
15	5	o	Joep Wennemars	Netherlands	1:08.16	+2.26
16	2	i	Zach Stoppelmoor	United States	1:08.17	+2.27
17	2	o	Cho Sanghyeok	South Korea	1:08.22	+2.32
18	1	i	Mathias Vosté	Belgium	1:08.23	+2.33
19	5	i	Moritz Klein	Germany	1:08.47	+2.57
20	4	o	Stefan Emele	Germany	1:08.72	+2.82

==== 1500 m ====
The race started on 24 January 2025 at 18:07.

Rank	Pair	Lane	Name	Country	Time	Diff
1st place, gold medalist(s)	10	o	Jordan Stolz	United States	1:41.22; TR	
2nd place, silver medalist(s)	10	i	Ning Zhongyan	China	1:42.24	+1.02
3rd place, bronze medalist(s)	8	i	Peder Kongshaug	Norway	1:42.25	+1.03
4	6	o	Kim Min-seok	Hungary	1:42.63	+1.41
5	6	i	Tim Prins	Netherlands	1:43.07	+1.85
6	9	o	Kjeld Nuis	Netherlands	1:43.09	+1.87
7	9	i	Sander Eitrem	Norway	1:43.34	+2.12
8	5	o	Connor Howe	Canada	1:43.37	+2.15
9	7	o	Taiyo Nonomura	Japan	1:43.87	+2.65
10	2	o	Wesly Dijs	Netherlands	1:44.14	+2.92
11	5	i	Kazuya Yamada	Japan	1:44.61	+3.39
12	1	i	Daniele Di Stefano	Italy	1:44.68	+3.46
13	8	o	Seitaro Ichinohe	Japan	1:45.00	+3.78
14	3	i	Bart Swings	Belgium	1:45.02	+3.80
15	4	i	Ryota Kojima	Japan	1:45.10	+3.88
16	3	o	Tijmen Snel	Netherlands	1:45.17	+3.95
17	7	i	Stefan Emele	Germany	1:45.34	+4.12
18	4	o	Didrik Eng Strand	Norway	1:45.57	+4.35
19	2	i	Joep Wennemars	Netherlands	1:45.75	+4.53
20	1	o	Ethan Cepuran	United States	1:46.45	+5.23

==== 10000 m ====
The race started on 25 January 2025 at 13:00.

Rank	Pair	Lane	Name	Country	Time	Diff
1st place, gold medalist(s)	5	o	Davide Ghiotto	Italy	12:25.69; WR; TR	
2nd place, silver medalist(s)	6	i	Metoděj Jílek	Czech Republic	12:37.81	+12.12
3rd place, bronze medalist(s)	5	i	Sander Eitrem	Norway	12:38.04	+12.35
4	4	i	Beau Snellink	Netherlands	12:39.34	+13.65
5	6	o	Graeme Fish	Canada	12:40.10	+14.41
6	4	o	Chris Huizinga	Netherlands	12:45.12	+19.43
7	2	i	Casey Dawson	United States	12:45.43	+19.74
8	3	i	Bart Swings	Belgium	12:53.86	+28.17
9	2	o	Michele Malfatti	Italy	12:57.09	+31.40
10	3	o	Ted-Jan Bloemen	Canada	13:01.14	+35.45
11	1	o	Patrick Beckert	Germany	13:02.28	+36.59
12	1	i	Marcel Bosker	Netherlands	13:06.46	+40.77

==== Mass start ====
The race started on 26 January 2025 at 14:32.

Rank	Name	Country	Points	Time
1st place, gold medalist(s)	Timothy Loubineaud	France	67	7:50.14
2nd place, silver medalist(s)	Fridtjof Petzold	Germany	47	7:50.48
3rd place, bronze medalist(s)	Indra Medard	Belgium	24	7:50.74
4	Lee Seung-hoon	South Korea	10	7:54.38
5	Daniele Di Stefano	Italy	6	7:54.60
6	Bart Swings	Belgium	3	7:54.63
7	Andrea Giovannini	Italy		7:54.68
8	Gabriel Odor	Austria		7:54.93
9	Ethan Cepuran	United States		7:54.94
10	Bart Hoolwerf	Netherlands		7:55.41
11	Shomu Sasaki	Japan		7:55.59
12	David La Rue	Canada		7:55.65
13	Livio Wenger	Switzerland		7:56.11
14	Mathieu Belloir	France		7:56.49
15	Jorrit Bergsma	Netherlands		7:56.51
16	Allan Dahl Johansson	Norway		7:57.30
17	Felix Maly	Germany		7:57.82
18	Didrik Eng Strand	Norway		7:58.21
19	Chung Jae-won	South Korea		7:58.77
20	Metoděj Jílek	Czech Republic		8:16.57

==== Team sprint ====
The race started on 26 January 2025 at 15:23.

Rank	Pair	Lane	Country	Time	Diff
1st place, gold medalist(s)	5	c	United States; Austin Kleba; Cooper McLeod; Zach Stoppelmoor	1:16.98; WR; TR	
2nd place, silver medalist(s)	4	c	Netherlands; Stefan Westenbroek; Jenning de Boo; Tim Prins	1:17.54	+0.56
3rd place, bronze medalist(s)	3	s	Poland; Marek Kania; Piotr Michalski; Damian Żurek	1:17.58	+0.60
4	5	s	Canada; Laurent Dubreuil; Anders Johnson; Connor Howe	1:17.75	+0.77
5	3	c	South Korea; Kim Jun-ho; Cha Min-kyu; Cho Sanghyeok	1:18.82	+1.84
6	1	s	Germany; Hendrik Dombek; Moritz Klein; Stefan Emele	1:19.77	+2.79
7	4	s	China; Lian Ziwen; Du Haonan; Liu Bin	1:21.55	+3.20
	2	s	Norway; Pål Myhren Kristensen; Henrik Fagerli Rukke; Bjørn Magnussen	Disqualified	
	2	c	Kazakhstan; Nikita Vazhenin; Artur Galiyev; Altaj Zjardembekuly	Disqualified	

=== Women's events ===
==== 1st 500 m ====
The race started on 26 January 2025 at 13:00.

Rank	Pair	Lane	Name	Country	Time	Diff
1st place, gold medalist(s)	1	o	Femke Kok	Netherlands	37.01	
2nd place, silver medalist(s)	10	i	Andżelika Wójcik	Poland	37.16	+0.15
3rd place, bronze medalist(s)	7	o	Kurumi Inagawa	Japan	37.24	+0.23
4	5	o	Kristina Silaeva	Kazakhstan	37.25	+0.24
5	10	o	Yukino Yoshida	Japan	37.46	+0.45
6	7	i	Kim Min-sun	South Korea	37.47	+0.46
7	6	o	Kaja Ziomek-Nogal	Poland	37.49	+0.48
8	8	i	Dione Voskamp	Netherlands	37.51	+0.50
9	9	o	Kimi Goetz	United States	37.69	+0.68
10	9	i	Suzanne Schulting	Netherlands	37.78	+0.77
11	6	i	Tian Ruining	China	37.79	+0.78
12	5	i	Jutta Leerdam	Netherlands	37.80	+0.79
13	3	o	Chen Ying-Chu	Chinese Taipei	37.85	+0.84
14	2	i	Karolina Bosiek	Poland	37.86	+0.85
15	4	i	Brittany Bowe	United States	37.89	+0.88
16	4	o	Carolina Hiller	Canada	37.95	+0.94
17	3	i	Vanessa Herzog	Austria	37.96	+0.95
18	1	i	Wang Jingziqian	China	38.15	+1.14
19	2	o	Sophie Warmuth	Germany	38.39	+1.38
20	8	o	Erin Jackson	United States	40.26	+3.25

==== 1000 m ====
The race started on 24 January 2025 at 18:57.

Rank	Pair	Lane	Name	Country	Time	Diff
1st place, gold medalist(s)	10	o	Miho Takagi	Japan	1:13.10	
2nd place, silver medalist(s)	9	o	Jutta Leerdam	Netherlands	1:13.46	+0.36
3rd place, bronze medalist(s)	8	i	Han Mei	China	1:13.58	+0.48
4	10	i	Angel Daleman	Netherlands	1:14.22	+1.12
5	9	i	Brittany Bowe	United States	1:14.28	+1.18
6	2	o	Andżelika Wójcik	Poland	1:14.47	+1.37
7	7	i	Kimi Goetz	United States	1:14.66	+1.56
8	2	i	Béatrice Lamarche	Canada	1:14.79	+1.69
9	3	i	Ayano Sato	Japan	1:15.03	+1.93
10	5	o	Natalia Jabrzyk	Poland	1:15.03	+1.93
11	6	i	Suzanne Schulting	Netherlands	1:15.07	+1.97
12	8	o	Antoinette Rijpma-de Jong	Netherlands	1:15.10	+2.00
13	1	i	Lea Sophie Scholz	Germany	1:15.17	+2.07
14	4	i	Yukino Yoshida	Japan	1:15.17	+2.07
15	6	o	Rio Yamada	Japan	1:15.18	+2.08
16	5	i	Kim Min-sun	South Korea	1:15.29	+2.19
17	1	o	Sofia Thorup-Prosvirnova	Denmark	1:15.50	+2.40
18	3	o	Karolina Bosiek	Poland	1:15.54	+2.44
19	4	o	Vanessa Herzog	Austria	1:16.06	+2.96
20	7	o	Nadezhda Morozova	Kazakhstan	1:16.72	+3.62

==== 1500 m ====
The race started on 25 January 2025 at 14:58.

Rank	Pair	Lane	Name	Country	Time	Diff
1st place, gold medalist(s)	8	i	Joy Beune	Netherlands	1:51.72	
2nd place, silver medalist(s)	8	o	Miho Takagi	Japan	1:51.85	+0.13
3rd place, bronze medalist(s)	9	o	Antoinette Rijpma-de Jong	Netherlands	1:52.17	+0.45
4	9	i	Angel Daleman	Netherlands	1:52.38	+0.66
5	3	o	Francesca Lollobrigida	Italy	1:53.65	+1.93
6	7	o	Brittany Bowe	United States	1:53.98	+2.26
7	10	o	Han Mei	China	1:54.00	+2.28
8	6	o	Ragne Wiklund	Norway	1:54.47	+2.75
9	5	o	Valérie Maltais	Canada	1:54.72	+3.00
10	7	i	Ivanie Blondin	Canada	1:54.80	+3.08
11	2	o	Greta Myers	United States	1:55.32	+3.60
11	4	o	Isabelle van Elst	Belgium	1:55.32	+3.60
13	2	i	Martina Sábliková	Czech Republic	1:55.50	+3.78
14	5	i	Nadezhda Morozova	Kazakhstan	1:55.51	+3.79
15	3	i	Momoka Horikawa	Japan	1:55.74	+4.02
16	6	i	Yang Binyu	China	1:55.85	+4.13
17	1	o	Park Ji-woo	South Korea	1:56.33	+4.61
18	4	i	Melissa Wijfje	Netherlands	1:56.35	+4.63
19	1	i	Mia Manganello	United States	1:56.56	+4.84
20	10	i	Marijke Groenewoud	Netherlands	1:58.73	+7.01

==== 5000 m ====
The race started on 24 January 2025 at 17:00.

Rank	Pair	Lane	Name	Country	Time	Diff
1st place, gold medalist(s)	4	o	Joy Beune	Netherlands	6:45.76	
2nd place, silver medalist(s)	3	i	Merel Conijn	Netherlands	6:47.44	+1.68
3rd place, bronze medalist(s)	6	o	Martina Sábliková	Czech Republic	6:49.01	+3.25
4	2	o	Francesca Lollobrigida	Italy	6:51.07	+5.31
5	6	i	Isabelle Weidemann	Canada	6:53.65	+7.89
6	5	o	Ragne Wiklund	Norway	6:56.64	+10.88
7	3	o	Sanne in 't Hof	Netherlands	6:57.72	+11.96
8	2	i	Valérie Maltais	Canada	6:57.76	+12.00
9	1	o	Yang Binyu	China	7:00.84	+15.08
10	5	i	Marijke Groenewoud	Netherlands	7:10.10	+24.34
11	4	i	Ivanie Blondin	Canada	7:12.20	+26.44
12	1	i	Momoka Horikawa	Japan	7:12.45	+26.69

==== Mass start ====
The race started on 26 January 2025 at 14:11.

Rank	Name	Country	Points	Time
1st place, gold medalist(s)	Greta Myers	United States	66	8:36.64
2nd place, silver medalist(s)	Jin Wenjing	China	43	8:44.38
3rd place, bronze medalist(s)	Michelle Uhrig	Germany	25	8:44.63
4	Ivanie Blondin	Canada	10	8:44.97
5	Marijke Groenewoud	Netherlands	6	8:45.65
6	Natalia Jabrzyk	Poland	4	8:57.27
7	Yang Binyu	China	3	8:45.92
8	Valérie Maltais	Canada		8:45.95
9	Mia Manganello	United States		8:46.10
10	Fran Vanhoutte	Belgium		8:46.87
11	Ramona Härdi	Switzerland		8:47.11
12	Momoka Horikawa	Japan		8:47.18
13	Elisa Dul	Netherlands		8:47.19
14	Park Ji-woo	South Korea		8:47.69
15	Kaitlyn McGregor	Switzerland		8:48.88
16	Sandrine Tas	Belgium		8:50.20
17	Josie Hofmann	Germany		8:52.59
18	Violette Braun	France		8:54.21
19	Aurora Grinden Løvås	Norway		8:55.99
20	Kim Yoonji	South Korea		9:06.88

==== Team sprint ====
The race started on 26 January 2025 at 15:00.

Rank	Pair	Lane	Country	Time	Diff
1st place, gold medalist(s)	4	c	Canada; Carolina Hiller; Béatrice Lamarche; Ivanie Blondin	1:24.90	
2nd place, silver medalist(s)	3	s	Poland; Andżelika Wójcik; Kaja Ziomek-Nogal; Karolina Bosiek	1:26.02	+1.12
3rd place, bronze medalist(s)	2	s	Kazakhstan; Kristina Silaeva; Darja Vazhenina; Nadezhda Morozova	1:26.36	+1.46
4	2	c	Germany; Marlen Ehlesuns; Sophie Warmuth; Anna Ostlender	1:27.63	+2.73
5	1	s	Norway; Carina Jagtøyen; Julie Nistad Samsonsen; Aurora Grinden Løvås	1:29.32	+4.42
	3	c	Netherlands; Femke Kok; Suzanne Schulting; Angel Daleman	Disqualified	
	4	s	China; Yu Shihui; Tian Ruining; Han Mei	Disqualified	
