= 2026 World Allround Speed Skating Championships – Men =

Men at the 2026 World Allround Speed Skating Championships
- Venue: Thialf
- Location: Heerenveen, Netherlands
- Dates: 7–8 March
- Competitors: 24 from 16 nations
- Winning points: 145.804

Medalists
gold medal	Sander Eitrem	Norway
silver medal	Metoděj Jílek	Czech Republic
bronze medal	Vladimir Semirunniy	Poland

The Men competition at the 2026 World Allround Speed Skating Championships was held on 7 and 8 March 2026.

== Results ==
=== 500 m ===
The race was started on 7 March at 13:38.

Rank	Pair	Lane	Name	Country	Time	Diff
1	10	I	Jordan Stolz	United States	34.22	
2	12	O	Peder Kongshaug	Norway	36.01	+1.79
3	12	I	Finn Elias Haneberg	Norway	36.11	+1.89
4	11	O	Gabriel Odor	Austria	36.22	+2.00
5	1	O	Motonaga Arito	Japan	36.41; PB	+2.19
6	10	O	Riku Tsuchiya	Japan	36.43	+2.21
7	4	I	Indra Médard	Belgium	36.57	+2.35
8	3	O	Metoděj Jílek	Czech Republic	36.61; PB	+2.39
9	8	I	Vladimir Semirunniy	Poland	36.69; PB	+2.47
10	1	I	Liu Hanbin	China	36.80; PB	+2.58
11	3	I	Tom Rudolph	Germany	36.82; PB	+2.60
12	4	O	Sander Eitrem	Norway	36.94	+2.72
13	5	I	Livio Wenger	Switzerland	37.15	+2.93
13	6	O	Gabriel Groß	Germany	37.15; PB	+2.93
15	9	I	Marcel Bosker	Netherlands	37.17	+2.95
16	2	O	Riccardo Lorello	Italy	37.34; PB	+3.12
17	7	O	Jung In-woo	South Korea	37.41; PB	+3.19
18	11	I	Max Halyk	Canada	37.51	+3.29
19	6	I	Chris Huizinga	Netherlands	37.67	+3.45
20	9	O	Luca Matteo Stibenz	Germany	37.75; PB	+3.53
21	5	O	Stijn van de Bunt	Netherlands	37.92	+3.70
22	8	O	Viktor Hald Thorup	Denmark	38.04	+3.82
23	7	I	Casey Dawson	United States	38.14	+3.92
24	2	I	Timothy Loubineaud	France	38.44	+4.22

=== 5000 m ===
The race was started on 7 March at 15:51.

Rank	Pair	Lane	Name	Country	Time	Diff
1	10	I	Sander Eitrem	Norway	6:01.61; TR	
2	8	O	Stijn van de Bunt	Netherlands	6:07.54; PB	+5.93
3	9	O	Vladimir Semirunniy	Poland	6:08.15	+6.54
4	11	O	Metoděj Jílek	Czech Republic	6:09.77	+8.16
5	10	O	Chris Huizinga	Netherlands	6:11.69	+10.08
6	11	I	Peder Kongshaug	Norway	6:12.33	+10.72
7	7	I	Riccardo Lorello	Italy	6:13.47	+11.86
8	12	I	Casey Dawson	United States	6:14.57	+12.96
9	9	I	Marcel Bosker	Netherlands	6:17.66	+16.05
10	8	I	Gabriel Groß	Germany	6:18.29	+16.68
11	4	O	Jordan Stolz	United States	6:19.66	+18.05
12	12	O	Timothy Loubineaud	France	6:24.58	+22.97
13	5	O	Viktor Hald Thorup	Denmark	6:25.62	+24.01
14	7	O	Livio Wenger	Switzerland	6:28.76	+27.15
15	4	I	Gabriel Odor	Austria	6:30.52	+28.91
16	6	O	Luca Matteo Stibenz	Germany	6:30.72	+29.11
17	6	I	Motonaga Arito	Japan	6:31.95	+30.34
18	3	I	Jung In-woo	South Korea	6:34.63	+33.02
19	1	I	Finn Elias Haneberg	Norway	6:37.73	+36.12
20	2	O	Indra Médard	Belgium	6:38.84	+37.23
21	5	I	Riku Tsuchiya	Japan	6:38.96	+37.35
22	3	O	Tom Rudolph	Germany	6:40.95	+39.34
23	2	I	Max Halyk	Canada	6:43.02	+41.41
			Liu Hanbin	China	Did not start	

=== 1500 m ===
The race was started on 8 March at 14:20.

Rank	Pair	Lane	Name	Country	Time	Diff
1	11	I	Jordan Stolz	United States	1:43.11	
2	11	O	Sander Eitrem	Norway	1:43.92	+0.81
3	10	I	Peder Kongshaug	Norway	1:44.20	+1.09
4	9	I	Metoděj Jílek	Czech Republic	1:45.01	+1.90
5	10	O	Vladimir Semirunniy	Poland	1:45.06	+1.95
6	8	I	Riccardo Lorello	Italy	1:45.57; PB	+2.46
7	6	O	Finn Elias Haneberg	Norway	1:45.87	+2.76
8	6	I	Gabriel Odor	Austria	1:46.08	+2.97
9	8	O	Chris Huizinga	Netherlands	1:46.38	+3.27
10	7	O	Gabriel Groß	Germany	1:46.54	+3.43
11	7	I	Marcel Bosker	Netherlands	1:47.05	+3.94
12	9	O	Stijn van de Bunt	Netherlands	1:47.13	+4.02
13	4	I	Livio Wenger	Switzerland	1:47.23	+4.12
14	3	I	Indra Médard	Belgium	1:47.45	+4.34
15	5	I	Motonaga Arito	Japan	1:47.64	+4.53
16	3	O	Jung In-woo	South Korea	1:47.94	+4.83
17	2	O	Tom Rudolph	Germany	1:49.26	+6.15
18	5	O	Riku Tsuchiya	Japan	1:49.31	+6.20
19	2	I	Luca Matteo Stibenz	Germany	1:49.59; PB	+6.48
20	4	O	Viktor Hald Thorup	Denmark	1:49.62	+6.51
21	1	I	Max Halyk	Canada	1:51.58	+8.47

=== 10000 m ===
The race was started on 8 March at 16:12.

Rank	Pair	Lane	Name	Country	Time	Diff
1	2	I	Metoděj Jílek	Czech Republic	12:30.54	
2	3	O	Vladimir Semirunniy	Poland	12:34.37	+3.83
3	4	O	Sander Eitrem	Norway	12:41.27	+10.73
4	1	I	Chris Huizinga	Netherlands	12:49.43	+18.89
5	2	O	Riccardo Lorello	Italy	12:50.49	+19.95
6	1	O	Stijn van de Bunt	Netherlands	12:57.36	+26.82
7	3	I	Peder Kongshaug	Norway	13:08.75	+38.21
8	4	I	Jordan Stolz	United States	13:32.28	+1:01.74

=== Overall standings ===
After all events.

Rank	Name	Country	500m	5000m	1500m	10000m	Points	Diff
1st place, gold medalist(s)	Sander Eitrem	Norway	36.94	6:01.61	1:43.92	12:41.27	145.804	
2nd place, silver medalist(s)	Metoděj Jílek	Czech Republic	36.61	6:09.77	1:45.01	12:30.54	146.117	+6.26
3rd place, bronze medalist(s)	Vladimir Semirunniy	Poland	36.69	6:08.15	1:45.06	12:34.37	146.243	+8.78
4	Jordan Stolz	United States	34.22	6:19.66	1:43.11	13:32.28	147.170	+27.32
5	Peder Kongshaug	Norway	36.01	6:12.33	1:44.20	13:08.75	147.413	+32.18
6	Riccardo Lorello	Italy	37.34	6:13.48	1:45.57	12:50.49	148.401	+51.94
7	Chris Huizinga	Netherlands	37.67	6:11.69	1:46.38	12:49.43	148.770	+59.32
8	Stijn van de Bunt	Netherlands	37.92	6:07.54	1:47.13	12:57.36	149.252	+1:08.96
9	Gabriel Groß	Germany	37.15	6:18.29	1:46.54	—	110.492	—
10	Marcel Bosker	Netherlands	37.17	6:17.66	1:47.05	—	110.619	—
11	Gabriel Odor	Austria	36.22	6:30.52	1:46.08	—	110.632	—
12	Finn Elias Haneberg	Norway	36.11	6:37.73	1:45.87	—	111.173	—
13	Motonaga Arito	Japan	36.41	6:31.95	1:47.64	—	111.485	—
14	Livio Wenger	Switzerland	37.15	6:28.76	1:47.23	—	111.769	—
15	Indra Médard	Belgium	36.57	6:38.84	1:47.45	—	112.270	—
16	Riku Tsuchiya	Japan	36.43	6:38.96	1:49.31	—	112.762	—
17	Jung In-woo	South Korea	37.41	6:34.63	1:47.94	—	112.853	—
18	Viktor Hald Thorup	Denmark	38.04	6:25.62	1:49.62	—	113.142	—
19	Tom Rudolph	Germany	36.82	6:40.95	1:49.26	—	113.335	—
20	Luca Matteo Stibenz	Germany	37.75	6:30.72	1:49.59	—	113.352	—
21	Max Halyk	Canada	37.51	6:43.02	1:51.58	—	115.005	—
	Casey Dawson	United States	38.14	6:14.57	DNS	—	—	—
	Timothy Loubineaud	France	38.44	6:24.58	DNS	—	—	—
	Liu Hanbin	China	36.80	Did not start		—	—	—
