= 2025–26 ISU Speed Skating World Cup =

World speed skating tournament in Europe and North-America

- Dates: 14 November 2025 – 25 January 2026

The 2025–26 ISU Speed Skating World Cup was a series of five speed skating events that took place between November 2025 and January 2026. The World Cup is organised by the International Skating Union, ISU.

The first four were qualifying events for the 2026 Olympic Winter Games. All were qualifying events for the 2026 World Allround Speed Skating Championships and the 2026 World Sprint Speed Skating Championships.

World Cup titles were awarded to the top point earners in the 500m, 1000m, 1500m, Long Distances, Mass Start, and Team Pursuit for men and women, as well as in the Mixed Gender Relay Team.

== Calendar ==
The calendar for the 2025–26 season.

WC #	Location	Venue	Date	500 m	1000 m	1500 m	3000 m	5000 m	10000 m	Mass start	Team pursuit	Team sprint	Mixed relay
1	Salt Lake City	Utah Olympic Oval	14–16 Nov	2m, 2w	m, w	m, w	w	m		m, w	m, w		
2	Calgary	Olympic Oval	21–23 Nov	2m, 2w	m, w	m, w	w	m		m, w	m, w		x
3	Heerenveen	Thialf	5–7 Dec	m, w	m, w	m, w		w	m	m, w		m, w	
4	Hamar	Vikingskipet	12–14 Dec	2m, 2w	m, w	m, w	w	m		m, w	m, w		x
5	Inzell	Max Aicher Arena	23–25 Jan	2m, 2w	m, w	m, w	w	m		m, w		m, w	
Total				9m, 9w	5m, 5w	5m, 5w	4w	4m, 1w	1m	5m, 5w	3m, 3w	2m, 2w	2x

== World Cup standings ==
=== Men's 500 Metres ===
Pos	Athlete	Points
1	(United States) Jordan Stolz	499
2	(Poland) Damian Żurek	441
3	(Netherlands) Jenning de Boo	372
4	(Japan) Wataru Morishige	325
5	(Norway) Bjørn Magnussen	302

=== Women's 500 Metres ===
Pos	Athlete	Points
1	(Netherlands) Femke Kok	420
2	(Poland) Kaja Ziomek-Nogal	344
3	(United States) Erin Jackson	335
4	(Netherlands) Marrit Fledderus	331
5	(Germany) Sophie Warmuth	299

=== Men's 1000 Metres ===
Pos	Athlete	Points
1	(United States) Jordan Stolz	300
2	(Poland) Damian Żurek	234
3	(Netherlands) Jenning de Boo	231
4	(Netherlands) Tim Prins	196
5	(Germany) Finn Sonnekalb	179

=== Women's 1000 Metres ===
Pos	Athlete	Points
1	(Netherlands) Femke Kok	264
2	(Netherlands) Jutta Leerdam	223
3	(United States) Brittany Bowe	209
4	(Japan) Miho Takagi	204
5	(Netherlands) Marrit Fledderus	203

=== Men's 1500 Metres ===
Pos	Athlete	Points
1	(United States) Jordan Stolz	300
2	(Netherlands) Kjeld Nuis	244
3	(China) Ning Zhongyan	242
4	(Germany) Finn Sonnekalb	220
5	(Netherlands) Tim Prins	174

=== Women's 1500 Metres ===
Pos	Athlete	Points
1	(Japan) Miho Takagi	248
2	(Netherlands) Joy Beune	240
3	(Netherlands) Antoinette Rijpma-de Jong	223
4	(Norway) Ragne Wiklund	218
5	(United States) Brittany Bowe	209

=== Men's Long Distances ===
Pos	Athlete	Points
1	(Czech Republic) Metoděj Jílek	264
2	(Norway) Sander Eitrem	253
2	(France) Timothy Loubineaud	253
4	(United States) Casey Dawson	218
5	(Italy) Davide Ghiotto	206

=== Women's Long Distances ===
Pos	Athlete	Points
1	(Norway) Ragne Wiklund	270
2	(Canada) Isabelle Weidemann	227
3	(Netherlands) Joy Beune	222
3	(Canada) Valérie Maltais	222
5	(Kazakhstan) Nadezhda Morozova	185

=== Men's Mass Start ===
Pos	Athlete	Points
1	(Netherlands) Jorrit Bergsma	227
2	(Italy) Andrea Giovannini	223
3	(Belgium) Bart Swings	211
4	(Czech Republic) Metoděj Jílek	199
5	(Switzerland) Livio Wenger	185

=== Women's Mass Start ===
Pos	Athlete	Points
1	(United States) Mia Manganello	253
2	(Netherlands) Marijke Groenewoud	252
3	(Canada) Ivanie Blondin	234
4	(Canada) Valérie Maltais	221
5	(Netherlands) Bente Kerkhoff	183

=== Men's Team Pursuit ===
Pos	Country	Points
1	United States	180
2	Netherlands	134
3	France	133
4	Italy	128
5	Germany	126

=== Women's Team Pursuit ===
Pos	Country	Points
1	Canada	168
2	Japan	156
3	United States	145
4	Netherlands	134
5	Germany	119

=== Men's Team Sprint ===
Pos	Country	Points
1	United States	114
2	Netherlands	108
3	Norway	102
4	Poland	81
4	Switzerland	81

=== Women's Team Sprint ===
Pos	Country	Points
1	Netherlands	120
2	Canada	108
3	United States	86
4	Poland	48
4	Germany	48

=== Mixed Gender Relay ===
Pos	Country	Points
1	Germany	97
2	Poland	92
3	Austria	91
4	Hungary	86
5	China	80

== Medal count ==
Rank	Nation	Gold	Silver	Bronze	Total
1	Netherlands	29	17	20	66
2	United States	22	7	7	36
3	Poland	4	8	4	16
4	Japan	4	4	6	14
5	Norway	3	5	8	16
6	Czech Republic	3	2	0	5
7	Canada	2	9	7	18
8	France	1	3	2	6
9	South Korea	1	2	5	8
10	Italy	1	2	2	5
11	Germany	0	5	2	7
12	China	0	2	4	6
13	Kazakhstan	0	2	0	2
14	Belgium	0	1	0	1
14	Chinese Taipei	0	1	0	1
16	Austria	0	0	1	1
16	Estonia	0	0	1	1
16	Hungary	0	0	1	1
Totals (18 entries)		70	70	70	210
