= List of Czech records in speed skating =

The following are the national records in speed skating in the Czech Republic maintained by the Czech Speed Skating Federation.

== Men ==
| Event | Record | Athlete | Date | Meet | Place | Ref |
|---|---|---|---|---|---|---|
| 500 meters | 36.55 | Erik Bouwman | 16 January 2000 | | Calgary, Canada | |
| 500 meters × 2 | 1:18.22 | Zdeněk Haselberger | 14 December 2013 | Universiade | Baselga di Pinè, Italy | |
| 1000 meters | 1:10.13 | Metoděj Jílek | 23 October 2026 | | Inzell, Germany | |
| 1500 meters | 1:43.91 | Metoděj Jílek | 15 November 2025 | World Cup | Salt Lake City, United States | |
| 3000 meters | 3:32.52 WR | Metoděj Jílek | 26 October 2025 | Fall World Cup Qualifier | Salt Lake City, United States | |
| 5000 meters | 6:01.98 | Metoděj Jílek | 24 January 2026 | World Cup | Inzell, Germany | |
| 5000 meters | 6:00.27 | Metoděj Jílek | 20 November 2026 | World Cup | Obihiro, Japan | |
| 10000 meters | 12:29.63 | Metoděj Jílek | 6 December 2025 | World Cup | Heerenveen, Netherlands | |
| Team sprint (3 laps) | 1:24.42 | Jakub Kočí; Tadeáš Procházka; Metoděj Jílek | 25 January 2026 | World Cup | Inzell, Germany | |
| Team pursuit (8 laps) | 3:52.44 | Tadeáš Procházka; Jakub Kočí; Metoděj Jílek | 16 November 2025 | World Cup | Salt Lake City, United States | |
| Sprint combination | 145.405 pts | Erik Bouwman | March 2000 | Olympic Oval Final | Calgary, Canada | |
| Small combination | 153.281 pts | Pim Berkhout | March 2000 | Olympic Oval Final | Calgary, Canada | |
| Big combination | 146.117 pts | Metoděj Jílek | 7–8 March 2026 | World Allround Championships | Heerenveen, Netherlands | |

== Women ==
| Event | Record | Athlete | Date | Meet | Place | Ref |
|---|---|---|---|---|---|---|
| 500 meters | 37.06 | Karolina Erbanová | 25 February 2017 | World Sprint Championships | Calgary, Canada | |
| 500 meters × 2 | 1:16.61 | Karolina Erbanová | 14 February 2015 | World Single Distance Championships | Heerenveen, Netherlands | |
| 1000 meters | 1:13.53 | Karolina Erbanová | 25 February 2017 | World Sprint Championships | Calgary, Canada | |
| 1500 meters | 1:52.86 | Nikola Zdráhalová | 22 November 2025 | World Cup | Calgary, Canada | |
| 3000 meters | 3:52.02 WR | Martina Sáblíková | 9 March 2019 | World Cup | Salt Lake City, United States | |
| 5000 meters | 6:41.18 | Martina Sáblíková | 15 February 2020 | World Single Distances Championships | Salt Lake City, United States | |
| 10000 meters | 13:48.33 WR | Martina Sáblíková | 15 March 2007 | Olympic Oval Final | Calgary, Canada | |
| Team sprint (3 laps) | 1:34.48 | Lucie Korvasová; Nikol Nepokojová; Veronika Antošová | 4 February 2023 | Neo-Senior World Cup | Inzell, Germany | |
| Team pursuit (6 laps) | 2:58.85 | Nikola Zdráhalová; Lucie Korvasová; Martina Sáblíková | 16 November 2025 | World Cup | Salt Lake City, United States | |
| Sprint combination | 147.970 pts | Karolina Erbanová | 25–26 February 2017 | World Sprint Championships | Calgary, Canada | |
| Mini combination | 159.858 pts | Martina Sáblíková | March 2006 | Olympic Oval Final | Calgary, Canada | |
| Small combination | 157.717 pts | Martina Sáblíková | 7–8 March 2015 | World Allround Championships | Calgary, Canada | |

== Mixed ==
| Event | Record | Athlete | Date | Meet | Place | Ref |
|---|---|---|---|---|---|---|
| Relay | 2:57.89 | Metoděj Jílek; Kateřina Kainová | 22 November 2026 | World Cup | Obihiro, Japan | |
