= Speed skating at the 2026 Winter Olympics – Men's 5000 metres =

Men's 5000 metres at the XXV Olympic Winter Games
- Speed skating
- Venue: Milano Speed Skating Stadium, Milan
- Date: 8 February 2026
- Competitors: 20 from 12 nations
- Winning time: 6:03.95

Medalists
1st place, gold medalist(s)		Sander Eitrem	Norway
2nd place, silver medalist(s)		Metoděj Jílek	Czech Republic
3rd place, bronze medalist(s)		Riccardo Lorello	Italy

The men's 5000 m competition in speed skating at the 2026 Winter Olympics was held on 8 February, at the Milano Speed Skating Stadium in Milan. Sander Eitrem of Norway won the event, setting a new Olympic record. Metoděj Jílek of the Czech Republic, skating in the pair with Eitrem, won silver, and Riccardo Lorello of Italy bronze. All of them became the first-time Olympic medalists.

== Background ==
The 2022 champion, Nils van der Poel, retired from competitions. The silver medalist, Patrick Roest, did not qualify for the Olympics. The bronze medalist, Hallgeir Engebråten, was still competing and qualified for the Olympics, but was only expected to participate in the team pursuit. Before the Olympics, Metoděj Jílek was leading the long-distance standings of the 2025–26 ISU Speed Skating World Cup. Sander Eitrem was the 5000m 2025 world champion. He set a new world record two weeks before the Olympics, becoming the first person to skate this distance faster than 6 minutes.

== Summary ==
Riccardo Lorello, skating in pair 3, became an early leader. In pair 8, Davide Ghiotto took the provisional silver medal position, however, in pair 9, Sander Eitrem and Metoděj Jílek finished in provisional first and second positions, pushing Lorello to the bronze medal position and Giotto off the podium. Eitrem set an Olympic record. In pair 10, he last one, Timothy Loubineaud only finished fifth, and thus the podium stayed the same.

== Records ==
Prior to this competition, the existing world, Olympic and track records were as follows.

World record	Sander Eitrem (NOR)	5:58.52	Inzell, Germany	24 January 2026
Olympic record	Nils van der Poel (SWE)	6:08.84	Beijing, China	6 February 2022
Track record				

A new Olympic record was set during the competition; the previous record was set four years earlier and was broken by 4.89 seconds; the top two finishers were under the previous record.

Date	Round	Athlete	Country	Time	Record
8 February	Pair 9	Sander Eitrem	Norway	6:03.95	OR, TR

== Results ==
Rank	Pair	Lane	Name	Country	Time	Time behind	Notes
1st place, gold medalist(s)	9	O	Sander Eitrem	Norway	6:03.95		OR, TR
2nd place, silver medalist(s)	9	I	Metoděj Jílek	Czech Republic	6:06.48	+2.53	
3rd place, bronze medalist(s)	3	I	Riccardo Lorello	Italy	6:09.22	+5.27	
4	8	I	Davide Ghiotto	Italy	6:09.57	+5.62	
5	10	O	Timothy Loubineaud	France	6:11.15	+7.20	
6	3	O	Peder Kongshaug	Norway	6:11.31	+7.36	
7	6	I	Chris Huizinga	Netherlands	6:11.58	+7.63	
8	8	O	Casey Dawson	United States	6:11.88	+7.93	
9	2	I	Stijn van de Bunt	Netherlands	6:12.94	+8.99	
10	1	O	Gabriel Groß	Germany	6:14.40	+10.45	
11	1	I	Marcel Bosker	Netherlands	6:17.47	+13.52	
12	7	O	Michele Malfatti	Italy	6:17.95	+14.00	
13	10	I	Ted-Jan Bloemen	Canada	6:17.97	+14.02	
14	2	O	Sigurd Henriksen	Norway	6:18.24	+14.29	
15	5	O	Bart Swings	Belgium	6:19.27	+15.32	
16	7	I	Felix Maly	Germany	6:21.42	+17.47	
17	4	O	Liu Hanbin	China	6:24.25	+20.30	
18	6	O	Alexander Farthofer	Austria	6:26.07	+22.12	
19	5	I	Fridtjof Petzold	Germany	6:27.56	+23.61	
20	4	I	Shomu Sasaki	Japan	6:27.97	+24.02	
