= World and Olympic records set at the 2026 Winter Olympics =

There were 10 Olympic records (OR) and one World record (WR) set in various skating events at the 2026 Winter Olympics in Italy.

== Figure skating ==
Event	Date	Athlete	Country	Score	Ref
Free Skate	16 February	Riku Miura and Ryuichi Kihara	Japan	158.13	

== Short-track speed skating ==
Event	Date	Round	Athlete	Country	Time	Record	Ref
Mixed 2000 metre relay	10 February	Final B	Xandra Velzeboer; Michelle Velzeboer; Teun Boer; Jens van 't Wout	Netherlands	2:35.537	OR	
Women's 500 metres	12 February	Semifinal 1	Xandra Velzeboer	Netherlands	41.399	WR, OR	

== Speed skating ==
Event	Date	Round	Athlete	Country	Time	Record	Ref
Women's 3000 metres	7 February	Pair 8	Francesca Lollobrigida	Italy	3:54.28	OR	
Men's 5000 metres	8 February	Pair 9	Sander Eitrem	Norway	6:03.95	OR	
Women's 1000 metres	9 February	Pair 15	Jutta Leerdam	Netherlands	1:12.31	OR	
Men's 1000 metres	11 February	Pair 14	Jordan Stolz	United States	1:06.28	OR	
Men's 500 metres	14 February	Pair 13	Jordan Stolz	United States	33.77	OR	
Women's 500 metres	15 February	Pair 15	Femke Kok	Netherlands	36.49	OR	
Men's 1500 metres	19 February	Pair 13	Ning Zhongyan	China	1:41.98	OR	
