= 2025 World Single Distances Speed Skating Championships – Men's 10000 metres =

Men's 10000 metres at the 2025 World Single Distances Speed Skating Championships
- Venue: Vikingskipet
- Location: Hamar, Norway
- Dates: 16 March
- Competitors: 12 from 10 nations
- Winning time: 12:46.15

Medalists
gold medal	Davide Ghiotto	Italy
silver medal	Vladimir Semirunniy	Poland
bronze medal	Metoděj Jílek	Czech Republic

The Men's 10000 metres competition at the 2025 World Single Distances Speed Skating Championships took place on 16 March 2025.

== Qualification ==
A total of 12 entry quotas were available for the event, with a maximum of two per country. The entry quotas were assigned to countries following a Special Qualification Ranking List based on rankings and performances of skaters during the 2024–25 ISU Speed Skating World Cup.

== Records ==
Prior to this competition, the existing world and track records were as follows.

	Time	Athlete	Date
World Record	12:25.69	Davide Ghiotto (ITA)	25 January 2025
Track Record	12:41.56	Nils van der Poel (SWE)	6 March 2022

== Results ==
The race was started at 13:55.

Rank	Pair	Lane	Name	Country	Time	Diff
1st place, gold medalist(s)	5	o	Davide Ghiotto	Italy	12:46.15	
2nd place, silver medalist(s)	2	o	Vladimir Semirunniy	Poland	12:49.93	+3.78
3rd place, bronze medalist(s)	5	i	Metoděj Jílek	Czech Republic	12:51.53	+5.38
4	2	i	Jorrit Bergsma	Netherlands	12:57.13	+10.98
5	4	i	Sander Eitrem	Norway	12:57.33	+11.18
6	4	o	Ted-Jan Bloemen	Canada	12:58.10	+11.95
7	1	i	Timothy Loubineaud	France	13:05.72	+19.57
8	6	o	Casey Dawson	United States	13:06.75	+20.60
9	6	i	Chris Huizinga	Netherlands	13:09.80	+23.65
10	3	o	Felix Maly	Germany	13:11.63	+25.48
11	3	i	Graeme Fish	Canada	13:13.55	+27.40
12	1	o	Jason Suttels	Belgium	13:32.04	+45.89
