= 2022 World Junior Speed Skating Championships =

International speed skating competition

- Venue: Eisschnelllaufbahn Innsbruck, Innsbruck, Austria
- Dates: 28–30 January

Medalist men
1st place, gold medalist(s)		Joep Wennemars	Netherlands
2nd place, silver medalist(s)		Tim Prins	Netherlands
3rd place, bronze medalist(s)		Emil Pedersen Matre	Norway

Medalist women
1st place, gold medalist(s)		Jade Groenewoud	Netherlands
2nd place, silver medalist(s)		Evelien Vijn	Netherlands
3rd place, bronze medalist(s)		Park Chae-won	South Korea

The 2022 World Junior Speed Skating Championships took place from 28 to 30 January 2022 in Innsbruck, Austria.

== Schedule ==
All times are local (UTC+1).

Date	Time	Events
28 January	10:00	500 m women 500 m men 1500 m women 1500 m men Mass start semifinals women Mass start semifinals men
29 January	10:00	1000 m women 1000 m men 3000 m women 5000 m men
30 January	10:00	Team pursuit women Team pursuit men Team sprint women Team sprint men Mass start final women Mass start final men

== Medal summary ==
=== Medal table ===
Rank	Nation	Gold	Silver	Bronze	Total
1	Netherlands	11	10	3	24
2	Japan	2	1	3	6
3	South Korea	1	1	3	5
4	Russia	1	1	1	3
5	Norway	1	0	3	4
6	Spain	0	2	0	2
7	Kazakhstan	0	1	1	2
8	Germany	0	0	2	2
Totals (8 entries)		16	16	16	48

=== Men's events ===
Event	Gold		Silver		Bronze	
500 m	Joep Wennemars; Netherlands	36.04	Nil Llop; Spain	36.28	Yuta Hirose; Japan	36.29
1000 m	Joep Wennemars; Netherlands	1:10.65	Kayo Vos; Netherlands	1:11.10	Tim Prins; Netherlands	1:11.17
1500 m	Tim Prins; Netherlands	1:50.31	Joep Wennemars; Netherlands	1:50.90	Emil Pedersen Matre; Norway	1:51.53
5000 m	Sigurd Henriksen; Norway	6:33.16	Stijn van de Bunt; Netherlands	6:41.07	Vladimir Semirunniy; Russia	6:41.79
Mass start	Yang Ho-jun; South Korea	30 pts	Kayo Vos; Netherlands	20 pts	Issei Matsumoto; Japan	10 pts
Team pursuit	Japan; Kotaro Kasahara; Issei Matsumoto; Shomu Sasaki	3:56.18	Netherlands; Tim Prins; Stijn van de Bunt; Joep Wennemars	3:59.80	Norway; Sondre Buer Åsebø; Sigurd Henriksen; Emil Pedersen Matre	4:01.25
Team sprint	Russia; Sergei Bukuev; Nikita Proshin; Vsevolod Yatov	1:25.49	Spain; Nil Llop; Alexander Rezzonico; Manuel Taibo	1:26.73	South Korea; Cho Yeong-jun; Jang Seo-jin; Ko Eun-woo	1:26.86
Overall classification	Joep Wennemars; Netherlands	149.302	Tim Prins; Netherlands	149.839	Emil Pedersen Matre; Norway	152.105

=== Women's events ===
Event	Gold		Silver		Bronze	
500 m	Pien Smit; Netherlands	39.38	Yukino Yoshida; Japan	39.49	Sophie Warmuth; Germany	39.82
1000 m	Yukino Yoshida; Japan	1:19.73	Alina Dauranova; Kazakhstan	1:20.59	Jade Groenewoud; Netherlands	1:20.64
1500 m	Jade Groenewoud; Netherlands	2:07.17	Evelien Vijn; Netherlands	2:08.12	Chloé Hoogendoorn; Netherlands	2:08.25
3000 m	Jade Groenewoud; Netherlands	4:17.40	Evelien Vijn; Netherlands	4:19.11	Mio Takahashi; Japan	4:25.86
Mass start	Chloé Hoogendoorn; Netherlands	30 pts	Evelien Vijn; Netherlands	21 pts	Park Chae-won; South Korea	12 pts
Team pursuit	Netherlands; Jade Groenewoud; Chloé Hoogendoorn; Evelien Vijn	3:07.29	Russia; Kseniia Korzhova; Daria Pavlova; Valeriia Sorokoletova	3:17.24	Germany; Marlen Ehseluns; Maira Jasch; Josephine Schlörb	3:18.70
Team sprint	Netherlands; Jildou Hoekstra; Chloé Hoogendoorn; Pien Smit	1:31.04	South Korea; Chung Hyun-seo; Lee Soo-yeon; Kang Soo-min	1:36.89	Kazakhstan; Alina Dauranova; Darya Gavrilova; Inessa Shumekova	1:38.34
Overall classification	Jade Groenewoud; Netherlands	167.360	Evelien Vijn; Netherlands	168.316	Park Chae-won; South Korea	171.118
