= 2024 World Single Distances Speed Skating Championships – Men's 5000 metres =

Men's 5000m, 2024, Championships

Men's 5000 metres at the 2024 World Single Distances Speed Skating Championships
- Venue: Olympic Oval
- Location: Calgary, Canada
- Dates: February 15
- Competitors: 20 from 11 nations
- Winning time: 6:07.28

Medalists
gold medal	Patrick Roest	Netherlands
silver medal	Davide Ghiotto	Italy
bronze medal	Sander Eitrem	Norway

The Men's 5000 metres competition at the 2024 World Single Distances Speed Skating Championships was held on February 15, 2024.

== Results ==
The race was started at 13:41.

Rank	Pair	Lane	Name	Country	Time	Diff
1st place, gold medalist(s)	9	i	Patrick Roest	Netherlands	6:07.28	
2nd place, silver medalist(s)	8	i	Davide Ghiotto	Italy	6:08.61	+1.33
3rd place, bronze medalist(s)	7	i	Sander Eitrem	Norway	6:09.00	+1.72
4	3	i	Timothy Loubineaud	France	6:12.15	+4.87
5	8	o	Ted-Jan Bloemen	Canada	6:12.66	+5.38
6	9	o	Michele Malfatti	Italy	6:14.74	+7.46
7	3	o	Chris Huizinga	Netherlands	6:15.04	+7.76
8	10	o	Bart Swings	Belgium	6:15.08	+7.80
9	2	o	Peter Michael	New Zealand	6:16.39	+9.11
10	10	i	Hallgeir Engebråten	Norway	6:18.49	+11.21
11	2	i	Shomu Sasaki	Japan	6:20.44	+13.16
12	7	o	Seitaro Ichinohe	Japan	6:20.72	+13.44
13	6	i	Casey Dawson	United States	6:21.63	+14.35
14	5	i	Kristian Gamme Ulekleiv	Norway	6:22.91	+15.63
15	1	i	Marcel Bosker	Netherlands	6:23.87	+16.59
16	4	o	Andrea Giovannini	Italy	6:24.31	+17.03
17	6	o	Wu Yu	China	6:25.24	+17.96
18	5	o	Riku Tsuchiya	Japan	6:28.27	+20.99
19	4	i	Livio Wenger	Switzerland	6:32.54	+25.26
20	1	o	Jordan Belchos	Canada	6:36.60	+29.32
