= 2026 European Speed Skating Championships – Men's 5000 metres =

Men's 5000 metres at the 2026 European Speed Skating Championships
- Venue: Ice Arena
- Location: Tomaszów Mazowiecki, Poland
- Dates: 10 January
- Competitors: 16 from 10 nations
- Winning time: 6:11.13

Medalists
gold medal	Vladimir Semirunniy	Poland
silver medal	Riccardo Lorello	Italy
bronze medal	Davide Ghiotto	Italy

The men's 5000 metres competition at the 2026 European Speed Skating Championships was held on 10 January 2026.

== Results ==
The race was started at 15:03.

Rank	Pair	Lane	Name	Country	Time	Diff
1st place, gold medalist(s)	5	i	Vladimir Semirunniy	Poland	6:11.13	
2nd place, silver medalist(s)	6	o	Riccardo Lorello	Italy	6:14.49	+3.36
3rd place, bronze medalist(s)	6	i	Davide Ghiotto	Italy	6:17.00	+5.87
4	4	i	Kars Jansman	Netherlands	6:21.39	+10.26
5	7	o	Bart Swings	Belgium	6:22.43	+11.30
6	8	i	Alexander Farthofer	Austria	6:23.46	+12.33
7	7	i	Michele Malfatti	Italy	6:24.11	+12.98
8	2	o	Wisse Slendebroek	Netherlands	6:26.08	+14.95
9	2	i	Luca Matteo Stibenz	Germany	6:27.53	+16.40
10	3	o	Giovanni Trebouta	France	6:27.89	+16.76
11	1	i	Jasper Krommenhoek	Netherlands	6:28.56	+17.43
12	8	o	Sigurd Henriksen	Norway	6:31.97	+20.84
13	1	o	Tom Rudolph	Germany	6:44.74	+33.61
14	3	i	Lukáš Steklý	Slovakia	6:46.85	+35.72
15	5	o	Sigurd Holbø Dyrset	Norway	6:50.56	+39.43
16	4	o	Tadeáš Procházka	Czech Republic	6:53.36	+42.23
