= 2024 Inline Speed Skating World Championships =

Speed skating competition

2024 World Championships
- Location: Montesilvano / Sulmona – Pescara, Italy
- Dates: 13–21 September

Champions
- Men: Italy
- Women: Colombia

The 2024 Inline Speed Skating World Championships was the 72st edition of the Inline Speed Skating World Championships overall and was held in Montesilvano (for the track events) and Sulmona – Pescara (for the road events) in Italy from 13 to 21 September 2024. It is held as part of the 2024 World Skate Games in Italy.

== Medal summary ==
=== Senior ===
==== Men ====
Event	Gold	Silver	Bronze
Track
200m Dual Time Trial	Vincenzo Maiorca; Italy	Kuo Li-yang; Chinese Taipei	Duccio Marsili; Italy
500m Sprint	Duccio Marsili; Italy	Vincenzo Maiorca; Italy	Jhoan Guzmán; Spain
1000m Sprint	Duccio Marsili; Italy	Bart Swings; Belgium	Hugo Ramírez; Chile
5000m points	Bart Swings; Belgium	Giovanni Trebouta; France	Julio Mirena; Paraguay
10000m elimination	Juan Mantilla; Colombia	Jason Suttels; Belgium	Giuseppe Bramante; Italy
3000m relay	Italy; Giuseppe Bramante; Vincenzo Maiorca; Duccio Marsili; Daniel Niero	Chinese Taipei; Chao Tsu-cheng; Huang Yu-lin; Kuo Li-yang; Tseng Chia-cheng	Colombia; Kevin Lenis; Juan Mantilla; Juan Rodríguez; Jhon Tascon
Road
100m Sprint	Jhoan Guzmán; Spain	Alessio Piergigli; Italy	Vincenzo Maiorca; Italy
1 Lap Sprint	Ron Pucklitzsch; Germany	Vincenzo Maiorca; Italy	Jhon Tascon; Colombia
10000m points	Bart Swings; Belgium	Jason Suttels; Belgium	Livio Wenger; Switzerland
15000m elimination	Juan Mantilla; Colombia	Felix Rijhnen; Germany	Jason Suttels; Belgium
42195m Marathon	Beddiaf Nolan; France	Felix Rijhnen; Germany	Juan Mantilla; Colombia

==== Women ====
Event	Gold	Silver	Bronze
Track
200m Dual Time Trial	Kollin Castro; Colombia	Asja Varani; Italy	Ivonne Nóchez; El Salvador
500m Sprint	María Fernanda Timms; Colombia	Kollin Castro; Colombia	Liu Yi-hsuan; Chinese Taipei
1000m Sprint	María Fernanda Timms; Colombia	Kollin Castro; Colombia	Gabriela Vargas; Ecuador
5000m points	Chang Yu-hsin; Chinese Taipei	Edda Paluzzi; Italy	Gabriela Rueda; Colombia
10000m elimination	Gabriela Rueda; Colombia	Luz Garzón; Colombia	Gabriela Vargas; Ecuador
3000m relay	Colombia; Kollin Castro; Luz Garzón; Gabriela Rueda; María Fernanda Timms	Chinese Taipei; Chang Yu-hsin; Li Meng-chu; Lin Xin-yu; Liu Yi-hsuan	France; Marie Dupuy; Manon Fraboulet; Marine Lefeuvre; Mathilde Pédronno
Road
100m Sprint	Ivonne Nóchez; El Salvador	Haila Brunet; France	Valeria Rodríguez; Colombia
1 Lap Sprint	Melissa Rebolledo; Colombia	María Fernanda Timms; Colombia	Mathilde Pédronno; France
10000m points	Gabriela Rueda; Colombia	Larissa Gaiser; Germany	Alison Bernardi; France
15000m elimination	Marine Lefeuvre; France	Gabriela Vargas; Ecuador	Marie Dupuy; France
42195m Marathon	Luz Garzón; Colombia	Lianne Van Ioon; Netherlands	Noraly Vonk; Netherlands

=== Junior ===
==== Men ====
Event	Gold	Silver	Bronze
Track
200m Dual Time Trial	Santiago Vásquez; Colombia	Guglielmo Lorenzoni; Italy	Cristian Scassellati; Italy
500m Sprint	Juan Yepes; Colombia	Jacob Melton; United States	Giacomo Gobbato; Italy
1000m Sprint	Metoděj Jílek; Czech Republic	Jacob Melton; United States	Adrián Alonso; Spain
5000m points	Metoděj Jílek; Czech Republic	Pan Cheng-yu; Chinese Taipei	Chung Yu-ting; Chinese Taipei
10000m elimination	Carlos Pisciotti; Colombia	Metoděj Jílek; Czech Republic	Adrián Alonso; Spain
3000m relay	Czech Republic; Metoděj Jílek; Jakub Kovarík; Adrian Vajanský	Colombia; Héctor Bayona; Carlos Pisciotti; Juan Yepes; Santiago Vásquez	Chinese Taipei; Chang Liang-yu; Chien Wei-hu; Pan Cheng-yu; Yu Yuan-hong
Road
100m Sprint	Cristian Scassellati; Italy	Zhi Pan; China	Alessio Mannai; Italy
1 Lap Sprint	Jacob Melton; United States	Luis Aguirre; Guatemala	Noe Guyomarc'h; France
10000m points	Metoděj Jílek; Czech Republic	Ryan Dawson; United States	Arthur Lebeaupin; France
15000m elimination	Metoděj Jílek; Czech Republic	Ashton Hale; United States	Adrián Alonso; Spain

==== Women ====
Event	Gold	Silver	Bronze
Track
200m Dual Time Trial	Sofia Chiumiento; Italy	Dairy Londoño; Colombia	Carola Falco; Italy
500m Sprint	Sofia Chiumiento; Italy	Dairy Londoño; Colombia	Rita De Gianni; Italy
1000m Sprint	Yicel Giraldo; Colombia	Sofia Chiumiento; Italy	Chang Hsuan-pei; Chinese Taipei
5000m points	Yicel Giraldo; Colombia	María Vivas; Colombia	Daniela Bustamante; Venezuela
10000m elimination	María Vargas; Colombia	Yicel Giraldo; Colombia	Daniela Bustamante; Venezuela
3000m relay	Colombia; Yicel Giraldo; Dairy Londoño; María Maldonado; María Vargas	Chinese Taipei; Chang Hsuan-pei; Chen Sin-yu; Hsia Tzu-han; Yang Yin Jie	France; Elisabeth Aoustin; Violette Braun; Maiwenn Julou; Lilou Tilagone-Vollard
Road
100m Sprint	Sofia Chiumiento; Italy	Dairy Londoño; Colombia	Asia Negri; Italy
1 Lap Sprint	Dairy Londoño; Colombia	Alicia McBride; United States	Asia Negri; Italy
10000m points	Yicel Giraldo; Colombia	Sofía Schilder; Netherlands	Daniela Bustamante; Venezuela
15000m elimination	María Vargas; Colombia	Violette Braun; France	Yicel Giraldo; Colombia

== Medal table ==
=== Senior ===
* Host nation (Italy)

Rank	Nation	Gold	Silver	Bronze	Total
1	Colombia	10	4	5	19
2	Italy*	4	5	3	12
3	Belgium	2	3	1	6
4	France	2	2	4	8
5	Chinese Taipei	1	3	1	5
6	Germany	1	3	0	4
7	El Salvador	1	0	1	2
7	Spain	1	0	1	2
9	Ecuador	0	1	2	3
10	Netherlands	0	1	1	2
11	Chile	0	0	1	1
11	Paraguay	0	0	1	1
11	Switzerland	0	0	1	1
Totals (13 entries)		22	22	22	66

=== Junior ===
* Host nation (Italy)

Rank	Nation	Gold	Silver	Bronze	Total
1	Colombia	10	6	1	17
2	Czech Republic	5	1	0	6
3	Italy*	4	2	7	13
4	United States	1	5	0	6
5	Chinese Taipei	0	2	3	5
6	France	0	1	3	4
7	China	0	1	0	1
7	Guatemala	0	1	0	1
7	Netherlands	0	1	0	1
10	Spain	0	0	3	3
10	Venezuela	0	0	3	3
Totals (11 entries)		20	20	20	60

=== Overall ===
* Host nation (Italy)

Rank	Nation	Gold	Silver	Bronze	Total
1	Colombia	20	10	6	36
2	Italy*	8	7	10	25
3	Czech Republic	5	1	0	6
4	France	2	3	7	12
5	Belgium	2	3	1	6
6	Chinese Taipei	1	5	4	10
7	United States	1	5	0	6
8	Germany	1	3	0	4
9	Spain	1	0	4	5
10	El Salvador	1	0	1	2
11	Netherlands	0	2	1	3
12	Ecuador	0	1	2	3
13	China	0	1	0	1
13	Guatemala	0	1	0	1
15	Venezuela	0	0	3	3
16	Chile	0	0	1	1
16	Paraguay	0	0	1	1
16	Switzerland	0	0	1	1
Totals (18 entries)		42	42	42	126

== See also ==
- 2024 World Skate Games
