= Sophie Warmuth =

German speed skater (born 2002)

Personal information
- Full name: Sophie Shirin Warmuth
- Born: 9 October 2002 (age 23) Erfurt, Germany

Sport
- Sport: Speed skating
- Event: 500 m
- Club: ESC Erfurt
Medal record
Women's speed skating
Representing Germany
World Junior Championships
Bronze medal – third place	2022 Innsbruck	500 m

Sophie Shirin Warmuth (born 9 October 2002) is a German speed skater. She represented Germany at the 2026 Winter Olympics.

== Career ==
Warmuth competed at the 2022 World Junior Speed Skating Championships and won a bronze medal in the 500 metres with a time of 39.82 seconds.

On 25 January 2026, during World Cup #5 of the 2025–26 ISU Speed Skating World Cup, she earned her first career World Cup podium, finishing in second place. She was subsequently selected to represent Germany at the 2026 Winter Olympics. She competed in the 500 metres and finished in eighth place with a time of 37.75 seconds.
