= Bente Kerkhoff =

Dutch speed skater (born 2001)

Personal information
- Born: 28 December 2001 (age 24) Oostwoud, Netherlands

Sport
- Country: Netherlands
- Sport: Speed skating

Bente Kerkhoff (born 28 December 2001) is a Dutch female speed skater who specializes in the long distances and mass start.

She is a member of Team AH Zaanlander and is coached by Jillert Anema. At the 2026 Dutch Distance Championships she won silver at the 3000 meters and bronze at the 5000 meters.

At the 2025–26 ISU Speed Skating World Cup competition in Hamar, Norway she won the mass start event.

Kerkhoff qualified for the 5000m at the 2026 Winter Olympics by finishing second on this distance at the Dutch Olympic qualifying event.

== Personal bests ==
Personal records
Speed skating
Event	Result	Date	Location	Notes
500 m	40.77	27 December 2022	Thialf, Heerenveen	
1000 m	1:20.45	19 December 2022	Thialf, Heerenveen	
1500 m	1:59.61	8 November 2024	Thialf, Heerenveen	
3000 m	3:58.83	27 December 2025	Thialf, Heerenveen	
5000 m	6:46.72	30 December 2022	Thialf, Heerenveen	
