= Vladimir Semirunniy =

Russian-Polish speed skater (born 2002)

Personal information
- Born: 11 December 2002 (age 23) Yekaterinburg, Sverdlovsk Oblast, Russia

Sport
- Country: Poland
- Sport: Speed skating
- Events: 5000m, allround
Medal record
Men's speed skating
Representing Poland
Olympic Games
Silver medal – second place	2026 Milano Cortina	10000 m
World Single Distances Championships
Silver medal – second place	2025 Hamar	10000 m
Bronze medal – third place	2025 Hamar	5000 m
World Allround Championships
Bronze medal – third place	2026 Heerenveen	Allround
European Championships
Gold medal – first place	2026 Tomaszów Mazowiecki	5000 m
Silver medal – second place	2026 Tomaszów Mazowiecki	1500 m
Representing Russia
World Junior Championships
Bronze medal – third place	2022 Innsbruck	5000 m

Vladimir Sergeyevich Semirunniy (Russian: Владимир Сергеевич Семирунний) or Władimir Siemirunnij in Polish (born 11 December 2002), is a Polish speed skater. He won a silver and a bronze medal representing Poland at the 2025 World Championships. At the 2026 Winter Olympics, he won a silver medal in the 10,000 metres event. Semirunniy placed third at the 2026 World Allround Championships.

== Career ==
In January 2022, Semirunniy represented Russia and won a bronze medal at the World Junior Championships in Innsbruck. In February that year, Russia invaded Ukraine and Russian athletes were banned from international competitions. In that season, Semirunniy won the Russian national championships in the 5,000 meters.

In September 2022 he decided to leave Russia to pursue his international sports career. In Poland, he could train with the national team but faced a 14-month suspension from competitions.

In the 2024–25 season, Semirunniy became the national Polish allround speed skating champion and set a national record in the 10,000 meters. Later that season, he obtained a silver medal at the 10,000 meter race and a bronze medal at the 5,000-meter race of the 2025 World Championships in Hamar, Norway.

On 26 August 2025 he received Polish citizenship. Semirunniy won the silver medal at the 10,000 meter race of the 2026 Winter Olympics. It was Poland's second medal of the games. At the 2026 World Allround Championships, Semirunniy obtained the bronze medal.
