= 2026 World Allround Speed Skating Championships =

Speed skating event in Heerenveen, Netherlands

- Location: Heerenveen, Netherlands
- Venue: Thialf
- Dates: 7–8 March

The 2026 World Allround Speed Skating Championships were held at the Thialf stadium in Heerenveen, Netherlands, on 7 and 8 March 2026.

== Schedule ==
All times are local (UTC+1).

Date	Time	Event
7 March	13:05	Women's 500 m
7 March	13:37	Men's 500 m
7 March	14:20	Women's 3000 m
7 March	15:46	Men's 5000 m
8 March	13:30	Women's 1500 m
8 March	14:16	Men's 1500 m
8 March	15:12	Women's 5000 m
8 March	16:06	Men's 10000 m

== Medal summary ==
=== Medal table ===
* Host nation (Netherlands)

Rank	Nation	Gold	Silver	Bronze	Total
1	Norway	2	0	0	2
2	Czech Republic	0	1	0	1
2	Netherlands*	0	1	0	1
4	Japan	0	0	1	1
4	Poland	0	0	1	1
Totals (5 entries)		2	2	2	6

=== Medalists ===
Event	Gold		Silver		Bronze	
Men	Sander Eitrem; Norway	145.804	Metoděj Jílek; Czech Republic	146.117	Vladimir Semirunniy; Poland	146.243
Women	Ragne Wiklund; Norway	157.457	Marijke Groenewoud; Netherlands	158.086	Miho Takagi; Japan	158.287
