= Riccardo Lorello =

Italian speed skater (born 2002)

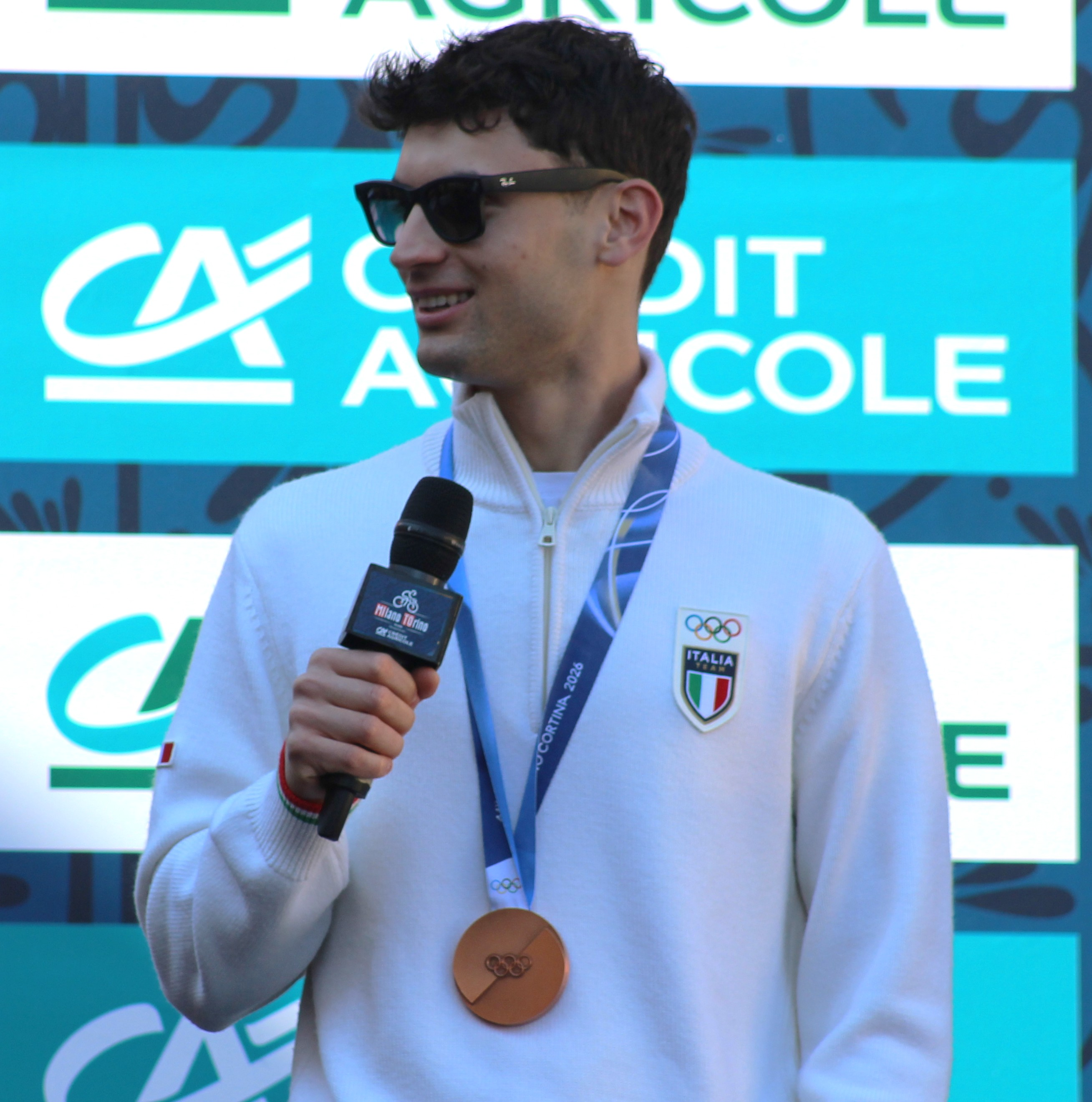
- Lorello in 2026 with the Olympic bronze medal

Personal information
- Nationality: Italian
- Born: 5 December 2002 (age 23) Milan, Italy

Sport
- Sport: Speed skating
Medal record
Men's speed skating
Representing Italy
Olympic Games
Bronze medal – third place	2026 Milano Cortina	5000 m
European Championships
Silver medal – second place	2026 Tomaszów Mazowiecki	5000 m
World University Games
Gold medal – first place	2023 Lake Placid	5000 m

Riccardo Lorello (born 5 December 2002) is an Italian speed skater. At the 2026 European Championships he won a silver medal. He won a bronze medal in the 5000m at the 2026 Winter Olympics.

== Career ==
Lorello started in his teenage years as an inline skater. After the 2020 COVID-19 pandemics, he moved to speed skating on ice and joined Centro Sportivo Esercito. Lorello represented Italy at the 2023 Winter World University Games, winning the gold medal at the 5000 metres race.

Lorello participated in the 2025-26 ISU Speed Skating World Cup events, earning a place for Italy at the long-distance speed skating races of the 2026 Winter Olympics. In January 2026, Lorello won a silver medal at the European Championships in Poland. He won the bronze medal in the 5000m at the Milano Cortina 2026 Olympics.
