= Metoděj Jílek =

Czech speed skater (born 2006)

Personal information
- Born: 11 June 2006 (age 20) Prague, Czech Republic

Sport
- Country: Czech Republic
- Sport: Speed skating
- Event(s): 5000m, 10000m, allround
Medal record
Representing Czech Republic
Men's speed skating
Event	1st	2nd	3rd
Olympic Games	1	1	0
World Single Distances Championships	0	0	1
World Allround Championships	0	1	0
World Junior Speed Skating Championships	2	2	1
Total	3	4	2
Olympic Games
Gold medal – first place	2026 Milano Cortina	10000 m
Silver medal – second place	2026 Milano Cortina	5000 m
World Single Distances Championships
Bronze medal – third place	2025 Hamar	10000 m
World Allround Championships
Silver medal – second place	2026 Heerenveen	Allround
World Junior Speed Skating Championships
Gold medal – first place	2025 Collalbo	5000 m
Gold medal – first place	2025 Collalbo	Mass start
Silver medal – second place	2024 Hachinohe	5000 m
Silver medal – second place	2025 Collalbo	Overall
Bronze medal – third place	2025 Collalbo	1500 m
Men's inline skating
Event	1st	2nd	3rd
World Junior Inline Skating Championships	5	1	0
Total	5	1	0
Inline Speed Skating World Championships
Gold medal – first place	2024 Pescara	1000 m sprint
Gold medal – first place	2024 Pescara	5000 m points
Gold medal – first place	2024 Pescara	3000 m relay
Gold medal – first place	2024 Pescara	10000 m points
Gold medal – first place	2024 Pescara	15000 m elimination
Silver medal – second place	2024 Pescara	10000 m elimination

Metoděj Jílek (Czech pronunciation: [ˈmɛtoɟɛj ˈjiːlɛk]; born 11 June 2006) is a Czech speed skater and inline speed skater. On ice, he is a gold medalist in 2026 Olympic 10,000 meter speed skating, a silver medalist in 2026 Olympic 5000 meter speed skating, bronze medalist at the 10,000 meter race of the 2025 World Championships and 2025 World Junior Champion at the Mass Start and 5000 meter races. Inline, he is 2024 World Junior Champion at five events.

== Life ==
Jílek was born on 11 June 2006 in Prague. He speaks English and Spanish. He is careful about his diet and has never tasted alcohol.

== Career ==
=== Speed skating ===
Jílek made his international debut at the World Junior Championships in 2023. The following year he won the silver medal at the 5,000 meter race.

In the 2024–25 season, Jílek established new World Junior Records over 5000 and 10000 meters. In the same season, he improved the Czech national records at the senior level over 1500, 3000, 5000 and 10000 meters. At the 2025 World Championships he won a bronze medal at the 10000 meter race, the first medal ever for a male Czech speed skater at the World Championships.

He was named "Junior Sportsperson of the year" at the Czech Republic's 2025 Sportsperson of the Year awards.

Jílek won the gold medal in the 10000m and the silver medal in the 5000m at the Milano Cortina 2026 Olympics.

Jílek won the silver medal in the Allround at the 2026 Heerenveen.

He was named "Best Newcomer" at the International Skating Union's 2025–26 Speed Skating Awards.

=== Inline skating ===
Jilek participated at the 2024 Inline Speed Skating World Championships, winning five gold medals at the junior level.

Awards
Preceded by Lurdes Gloria Manuel	Czech Junior Athlete of the Year; 2025	Succeeded by TBA
