= Stijn van de Bunt =

Dutch speed skater (born 2004)

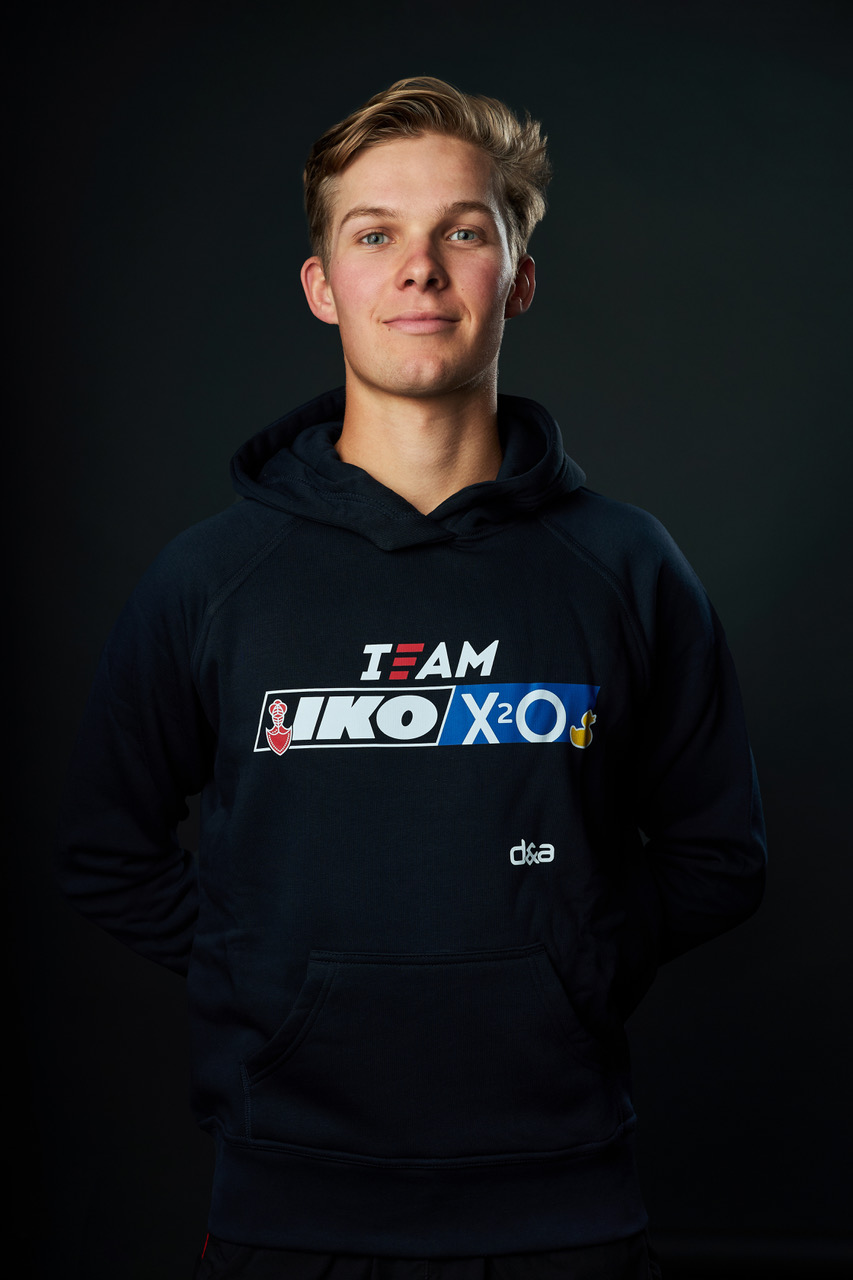
- Van de Bunt in 2025

Personal information
- Born: 6 April 2004 (age 22) Nieuwegein, Netherlands

Sport
- Country: Netherlands
- Sport: Speed skating

Stijn van de Bunt (born 6 April 2004) is a Dutch long track speed skater who specializes in the mid and long distances.

At the 2022 World Junior Speed Skating Championships he won a silver medal in the 5000 meters as well as in the team pursuit. In 2024 and 2025 Van de Bunt won the Gruno Bokaal, held in Groningen, the Netherlands. During the Olympic qualification tournament, held in Thialf in December 2025, he won the 5000 meters and 10000 meters and thus qualified for the 2026 Winter Olympics. At the 10000 meters Van de Bunt improved his personal record to 12:36.35, a fraction above the Dutch national record of Patrick Roest.

== Personal records ==
Personal records
Speed skating
Event	Result	Date	Location	Notes
500 m	37:65	17 September 2022	Thialf, Heerenveen	
1000 m	1.12.78	30 September 2022	Eisstadion Inzell, Inzell	
1500 m	1:47.02	30 December 2025	Thialf, Heerenveen	
3000 m	3:38.94	29 November 2025	Thialf, Heerenveen	
5000 m	6:07.54	7 March 2026	Thialf, Heerenveen	
10000 m	12:36.35	28 December 2025	Thialf, Heerenveen	

He is currently in 50th position in the adelskalender with 148.070 points.
