= Sander Eitrem =

Norwegian speed skater (born 2002)

Personal information
- Nationality: Norwegian
- Born: 12 February 2002 (age 24) Norway

Sport
- Country: Norway
- Sport: Speed skating
- Club: Nord-Odal IL
Medal record
Men's speed skating
Representing Norway
Olympic Games
Gold medal – first place	2026 Milano Cortina	5000 m
World Single Distances Championships
Gold medal – first place	2025 Hamar	5000 m
Silver medal – second place	2024 Calgary	Team pursuit
Bronze medal – third place	2024 Calgary	5000 m
World Allround Championships
Gold medal – first place	2026 Heerenveen	Allround
European Championships
Gold medal – first place	2024 Heerenveen	Team pursuit
Gold medal – first place	2025 Heerenveen	Allround
Silver medal – second place	2023 Hamar	Allround
Bronze medal – third place	2024 Heerenveen	5000 m

Sander Eitrem (born 12 February 2002) is a Norwegian allround speed skater from Skreia in Østre Toten.

In February 2022, he competed in the World Allround Speed Skating Championships, which were held at Vikingskipet in Hamar, Norway, and finished in fifth position in the overall standings.

Eitrem won the 5000 meters event at the 2023 European Speed Skating Championships and finished second in the overall standings behind reigning European champion Patrick Roest. He won the allround title at the 2025 European Speed Skating Championships, held in Thialf, Heerenveen in January 2025, and improved the Norwegian national records on the 5000 and 10000 meters. Later that month, at the ISU World Cup event in Calgary, he again set a new personal and national record on the 10000 meters.

On 24 January 2026, Eitrem skated a new 5000 meters world record of 5:58.52 and became the first person to complete the distance under six minutes.

Eitrem won the gold medal in 5000 meters speed skating at the 2026 Winter Olympics in Milan, Italy. He also set a new Olympic record of 6:03.95.

== Personal records ==
Personal records
Speed skating
Event	Result	Date	Location	Notes
500 metres	36.79	11 January 2025	Thialf, Heerenveen	
1000 metres	1:09.87	7 November 2025	Utah Olympic Oval, Salt Lake City	
1500 metres	1:43.23	9 December 2022	Olympic Oval, Calgary	
3000 metres	3:38.20	4 January 2026	Vikingskipet, Hamar	
5000 metres	5:58.52	24 January 2026	Max Aicher Arena, Inzell	WR
10000 metres	12:38.04	25 January 2025	Olympic Oval, Calgary	NR

He is currently in 4th position in the adelskalender with 144.954 points.
