= Timothy Loubineaud =

French speed skater (born 1996)

Personal information
- Nationality: French
- Born: 5 June 1996 (age 29) Arcachon, France

Sport
- Sport: Speed skating

Timothy Loubineaud (born 5 June 1996) is a French speed skater.

== Career ==
Loubineaud initially practiced roller skating before taking up speed skating on ice. He trained in Berlin with Alexis Contin as his coach before joining the new French national team after the sport was taken over by the French Roller and Skateboard Federation.

In January 2023, Loubineaud finished twelfth overall at the European Speed Skating Championships, the second-highest placed Frenchman behind Mathieu Belloir, who finished tenth.

In January 2024, Loubineaud broke the French record for the 5000 meters and won the Division B event in the World Cup. He then finished seventh at the European Championships in the same event. He was part of the men's team that finished fifth in the pursuit at the European Championships, along with Mathieu Belloir and Valentin Thiébault. During the World Cup mass start, he suffered a violent crash. The following month, he finished fourth in the 5000 meters at the World Championships.

In the summer of 2024, Loubineaud was hit by a truck at his home in Gujan-Mestras.

On 24 November 2024, Loubineaud won the mass start event at the Speed Skating World Cup in Nagano. This was the first World Cup victory for a Frenchman since Alexis Contin in 2015. He also finished sixth in the 5000 meters. On 25 January 2025, at the Speed Skating World Cup in Calgary, he broke the French record in the 10,000 meters, qualifying for the World Championships in that distance. The following day, he won the mass start. He finished third in the overall season standings in the mass start, the first French podium finish since Alexis Contin, who was also his coach in Berlin.

Loubineaud withdrew from the European Championships in early January 2025 due to overtraining.

In February 2025, he qualified the men's pursuit team for the World Championships with Valentin Thiebault and Germain Deschamps. At the World Championships, he finished ninth in the 5000 meters, suffering from significant fatigue in the last two laps. He finished sixth in the mass start, a result he considered disappointing after excellent performances in the World Cup. Finally, he finished seventh in the 10,000 meters, and the men's team pursuit also finished seventh.

In October 2025, Loubineaud broke his French record in the 10,000 meters with a time of 12:42.38, two seconds faster than his previous record in January 2025. In this competition, he finished 11 seconds behind Italian Olympic bronze medalist Davide Ghiotto. On 14 November 2025, in Salt Lake City, during a World Cup event, he broke the world record for the 5000m with a time of 6:00.23.
