= List of United States records in speed skating =

The following are the national records in speed skating in the United States maintained by the United States' national speed skating federation USSpeedskating.

== Men ==
Event	Record	Athlete	Date	Meet	Place	Ref
500 meters	33.69	Jordan Stolz	16 February 2024	World Single Distances Championships	Calgary, Canada	
500 meters × 2	69.03	Tucker Fredricks	9 March 2007	World Single Distance Championships	Salt Lake City, United States	
1000 meters	1:05.37 WR	Jordan Stolz	26 January 2024	World Cup	Salt Lake City, United States	
1500 meters	1:40.48	Jordan Stolz	15 November 2025	World Cup	Salt Lake City, United States	
3000 meters	3:33.82	Casey Dawson	6 November 2025	Beehive Burn	Salt Lake City, United States	
5000 meters	6:01.84	Casey Dawson	21 November 2025	World Cup	Calgary, Canada	
10000 meters	12:45.43	Casey Dawson	25 January 2025	World Cup	Calgary, Canada	
Team sprint (3 laps)	1:16.98 WR	Austin Kleba; Cooper McLeod; Zach Stoppelmoor	26 January 2025	World Cup	Calgary, Canada	
Team pursuit (8 laps)	3:32.49 WR	Casey Dawson; Emery Lehman; Ethan Cepuran	16 November 2025	World Cup	Salt Lake City, United States	
Sprint combination	135.500 pts	Jordan Stolz	5–6 March 2026	World Sprint Championships	Heerenveen, Netherlands	
Small combination	149.432 pts	Brian Hansen	12–13 March 2010	World Junior Championships	Moscow, Russia	
Big combination	144.740 pts WR	Jordan Stolz	9–10 March 2024	World Allround Championships	Inzell, Germany	

== Women ==
Event	Record	Athlete	Date	Meet	Place	Ref
500 meters	36.57	Erin Jackson	16 November 2025	World Cup	Salt Lake City, United States	
500 meters × 2	74.19 WR	Heather Richardson	28 December 2013	US Olympic Trials	Salt Lake City, United States	
1000 meters	1:11.61 WR	Brittany Bowe	9 March 2019	World Cup	Salt Lake City, United States	
1500 meters	1:50.32	Brittany Bowe	10 March 2019	World Cup	Salt Lake City, United States	
3000 meters	4:00.70	Greta Myers	21 November 2025	World Cup	Calgary, Canada	
5000 meters	6:56.92	Catherine Raney-Norman	31 December 2005	US Championships	Salt Lake City, United States	
10000 meters	14:56.12	Catherine Raney-Norman	11 March 2005	Olympic Oval Final	Calgary, Canada	
Team sprint (3 laps)	1:25.00	Brittany Bowe; Erin Jackson; Sarah Warren	19 January 2024	Four Continents Championships	Salt Lake City, United States	
Team pursuit (6 laps)	2:53.58	Giorgia Birkeland; Brittany Bowe; Mia Manganello	23 November 2025	World Cup	Calgary, Canada	
Sprint combination	147.185 pts	Heather Richardson-Bergsma	25–26 February 2017	World Sprint Championships	Calgary, Canada	
Mini combination	158.546 pts	Becky Sundstrom	15–17 March 2001	Olympic Oval Final	Calgary, Canada	
Small combination	160.046 pts	Heather Richardson	7–8 March 2015	World Allround Championships	Calgary, Canada	

== Mixed ==
Event	Record	Athlete	Date	Meet	Place	Ref
Relay	2:57.63	Conor McDermott-Mostowy; Kimi Goetz	12 November 2023	World Cup	Obihiro, Japan	
