= 2024–25 ISU Speed Skating World Cup – World Cup 1 =

Ice skating competition in Nagano, Japan

2024–25 ISU Speed Skating World Cup 1
- Venue: M-Wave; Nagano; Japan
- Dates: 22 — 24 November 2024

The first competition weekend of the 2024–25 ISU Speed Skating World Cup was held at the M-Wave in Nagano, Japan, from Friday, 22 November, until Sunday, 24 November 2024.

== Medal summary ==
=== Men's events ===
| Event | Gold | Time | Silver | Time | Bronze | Time | Report |
|---|---|---|---|---|---|---|---|
| 500 m (1) | Jordan Stolz; United States | 34.43 | Laurent Dubreuil; Canada | 34.58 | Tatsuya Shinhama; Japan | 34.58 | |
| 500 m (2) | Jordan Stolz; United States | 34.41 | Tatsuya Shinhama; Japan | 34.49 | Merijn Scheperkamp; Netherlands | 34.73 | |
| 1000 m | Jordan Stolz; United States | 1:07.18; TR | Jenning de Boo; Netherlands | 1:08.29 | Cooper McLeod; United States | 1:08.43 | |
| 1500 m | Jordan Stolz; United States | 1:43.65; TR | Sander Eitrem; Norway | 1:44.59 | Ning Zhongyan; China | 1:44.69 | |
| 5000 m | Davide Ghiotto; Italy | 6:12.71; TR | Beau Snellink; Netherlands | 6:13.99 | Sander Eitrem; Norway | 6:15.71 | |
| Mass start^{A} | Timothy Loubineaud; France | 63 | Daniele Di Stefano; Italy | 40 | Bart Hoolwerf; Netherlands | 20 | |
| Team pursuit | Italy; Davide Ghiotto; Michele Malfatti; Andrea Giovannini | 3:39.82 | United States; Casey Dawson; Emery Lehman; Ethan Cepuran | 3:41.83 | Norway; Sander Eitrem; Peder Kongshaug; Hallgeir Engebråten | 3:42.31 | |

^{A} In mass start, race points are accumulated during the race based on results of the intermediate sprints and the final sprint. The skater with most race points is the winner.

=== Women's events ===
| Event | Gold | Time | Silver | Time | Bronze | Time | Report |
|---|---|---|---|---|---|---|---|
| 500 m (1) | Yukino Yoshida; Japan | 37.74 | Andżelika Wójcik; Poland | 37.92 | Kim Min-sun; South Korea | 37.93 | |
| 500 m (2) | Erin Jackson; United States | 37.78 | Dione Voskamp; Netherlands | 37.84 | Kimi Goetz; United States | 37.98 | |
| 1000 m | Miho Takagi; Japan | 1:14.60 | Jutta Leerdam; Netherlands | 1:14.96 | Brittany Bowe; United States | 1:15.17 | |
| 1500 m | Miho Takagi; Japan | 1:55.02 | Han Mei; China | 1:55.18 | Joy Beune; Netherlands | 1:55.58 | |
| 3000 m | Ivanie Blondin; Canada | 4:03.76 | Ragne Wiklund; Norway | 4:04.60 | Joy Beune; Netherlands | 4:04.60 | |
| Mass start^{A} | Marijke Groenewoud; Netherlands | 60 | Ivanie Blondin; Canada | 40 | Elisa Dul; Netherlands | 21 | |
| Team pursuit | Netherlands; Joy Beune; Antoinette Rijpma-de Jong; Marijke Groenewoud | 2:56.80 | Japan; Miho Takagi; Momoka Horikawa; Ayano Sato | 2:58.12 | United States; Brittany Bowe; Mia Manganello; Greta Myers | 3:01.01 | |

^{A} In mass start, race points are accumulated during the race based on results of the intermediate sprints and the final sprint. The skater with most race points is the winner.

=== Mixed events ===
| Event | Gold | Time | Silver | Time | Bronze | Time | Report |
|---|---|---|---|---|---|---|---|
| Mixed gender relay | South Korea; Kim Min-sun; Oh Hyun-min | 2:57.29 | Belgium; Robbe Beelen; Fran Vanhoutte | 2:59.42 | Canada; Ivanie Blondin; Yankun Zhao | 3:00.44 | |

== Results ==
=== Men's events ===
==== 1st 500 m ====
The race started on 22 November 2024 at 14:28.

| Rank | Pair | Lane | Name | Country | Time | Diff |
|---|---|---|---|---|---|---|
| 1st place, gold medalist(s) | 8 | o | Jordan Stolz | United States | 34.43 | |
| 2nd place, silver medalist(s) | 9 | o | Laurent Dubreuil | Canada | 34.58 | +0.15 |
| 3rd place, bronze medalist(s) | 8 | i | Tatsuya Shinhama | Japan | 34.58 | +0.15 |
| 4 | 9 | i | Jenning de Boo | Netherlands | 34.63 | +0.20 |
| 5 | 3 | o | Kim Jun-ho | South Korea | 34.63 | +0.20 |
| 6 | 3 | i | Marek Kania | Poland | 34.80 | +0.37 |
| 7 | 10 | i | Stefan Westenbroek | Netherlands | 34.82 | +0.39 |
| 8 | 6 | i | Wataru Morishige | Japan | 34.86 | +0.43 |
| 9 | 6 | o | Katsuhiro Kuratsubo | Japan | 34.88 | +0.45 |
| 10 | 10 | o | Merijn Scheperkamp | Netherlands | 34.97 | +0.54 |
| 11 | 1 | o | Gao Tingyu | China | 35.13 | +0.70 |
| 12 | 7 | o | Bjørn Magnussen | Norway | 35.18 | +0.75 |
| 13 | 5 | o | Damian Żurek | Poland | 35.23 | +0.80 |
| 14 | 5 | i | Yamato Matsui | Japan | 35.37 | +0.94 |
| 15 | 2 | i | Piotr Michalski | Poland | 35.43 | +1.00 |
| 16 | 2 | o | Siver Brattgjerd | Norway | 35.56 | +1.13 |
| 17 | 1 | i | David Bosa | Italy | 35.68 | +1.25 |
| 18 | 4 | o | Nil Llop | Spain | 44.12 | +9.69 |
| 19 | 4 | i | Ryota Kojima | Japan | 57.77 | +23.34 |
| 20 | 7 | i | Zach Stoppelmoor | United States | 58.78 | +24.35 |

==== 2nd 500 m ====
The race started on 24 November 2024 at 14:30.

| Rank | Pair | Lane | Name | Country | Time | Diff |
|---|---|---|---|---|---|---|
| 1st place, gold medalist(s) | 10 | i | Wataru Morishige | Japan | 34.64 | |
| 2nd place, silver medalist(s) | 10 | o | Tatsuya Shinhama | Japan | 34.69 | +0.05 |
| 3rd place, bronze medalist(s) | 9 | i | Jordan Stolz | United States | 34.94 | +0.30 |
| 4 | 4 | i | Yudai Yamamoto | Japan | 34.94 | +0.30 |
| 5 | 9 | o | Yuma Murakami | Japan | 34.96 | +0.32 |
| 6 | 7 | i | Laurent Dubreuil | Canada | 35.03 | +0.39 |
| 7 | 1 | o | Janno Botman | Netherlands | 35.08 | +0.44 |
| 8 | 8 | o | Hein Otterspeer | Netherlands | 35.08 | +0.44 |
| 9 | 8 | i | Takuya Morimoto | Japan | 35.20 | +0.56 |
| 10 | 4 | o | Bjørn Magnussen | Norway | 35.21 | +0.57 |
| 11 | 3 | o | Merijn Scheperkamp | Netherlands | 35.22 | +0.58 |
| 12 | 2 | o | Cooper McLeod | United States | 35.32 | +0.68 |
| 13 | 6 | i | Nil Llop | Spain | 35.33 | +0.69 |
| 14 | 5 | o | David Bosa | Italy | 35.36 | +0.72 |
| 15 | 7 | o | Kim Jun-ho | South Korea | 35.39 | +0.75 |
| 16 | 3 | i | Piotr Michalski | Poland | 35.44 | +0.80 |
| 17 | 5 | i | Cha Min-kyu | South Korea | 35.53 | +0.89 |
| 18 | 6 | o | Marek Kania | Poland | 35.53 | +0.89 |
| 19 | 1 | i | Yevgeniy Koshkin | Kazakhstan | 35.64 | +1.00 |
| 20 | 2 | i | Damian Żurek | Poland | 35.84 | +1.20 |

==== 1000 m ====
The race started on 23 November 2024 at 15:47.

| Rank | Pair | Lane | Name | Country | Time | Diff |
|---|---|---|---|---|---|---|
| 1st place, gold medalist(s) | 9 | o | Jordan Stolz | United States | 1:07.18; TR | |
| 2nd place, silver medalist(s) | 9 | i | Jenning de Boo | Netherlands | 1:08.29 | +1.11 |
| 3rd place, bronze medalist(s) | 6 | i | Cooper McLeod | United States | 1:08.43 | +1.25 |
| 4 | 5 | i | Ryota Kojima | Japan | 1:08.54 | +1.36 |
| 5 | 8 | o | Marten Liiv | Estonia | 1:08.59 | +1.41 |
| 6 | 1 | o | Kjeld Nuis | Netherlands | 1:08.63 | +1.45 |
| 7 | 7 | i | Ning Zhongyan | China | 1:08.70 | +1.52 |
| 8 | 10 | i | Tim Prins | Netherlands | 1:08.70 | +1.52 |
| 9 | 5 | o | Laurent Dubreuil | Canada | 1:08.71 | +1.53 |
| 10 | 7 | o | Taiyo Nonomura | Japan | 1:08.80 | +1.62 |
| 11 | 4 | o | Moritz Klein | Germany | 1:09.38 | +2.20 |
| 12 | 8 | i | Tatsuya Shinhama | Japan | 1:09.40 | +2.22 |
| 13 | 3 | i | Masaya Yamada | Japan | 1:09.48 | +2.30 |
| 14 | 6 | o | Zach Stoppelmoor | United States | 1:09.49 | +2.31 |
| 15 | 3 | o | Peder Kongshaug | Norway | 1:09.70 | +2.52 |
| 16 | 4 | i | Damian Żurek | Poland | 1:09.74 | +2.56 |
| 17 | 1 | i | Stefan Emele | Germany | 1:10.06 | +2.88 |
| 18 | 10 | o | Connor Howe | Canada | 1:10.31 | +3.13 |
| 19 | 2 | i | Issa Gunji | Japan | 1:10.52 | +3.34 |
| 20 | 2 | o | David Bosa | Italy | 1:10.53 | +3.35 |

==== 1500 m ====
The race started on 22 November 2024 at 15:44.

| Rank | Pair | Lane | Name | Country | Time | Diff |
|---|---|---|---|---|---|---|
| 1st place, gold medalist(s) | 10 | o | Jordan Stolz | United States | 1:43.65; TR | |
| 2nd place, silver medalist(s) | 6 | o | Sander Eitrem | Norway | 1:44.59 | +0.94 |
| 3rd place, bronze medalist(s) | 10 | i | Ning Zhongyan | China | 1:44.69 | +1.04 |
| 4 | 8 | o | Kjeld Nuis | Netherlands | 1:44.84 | +1.19 |
| 5 | 7 | o | Taiyo Nonomura | Japan | 1:45.03 | +1.38 |
| 6 | 5 | o | Peder Kongshaug | Norway | 1:45.16 | +1.51 |
| 7 | 6 | i | Seitaro Ichinohe | Japan | 1:45.47 | +1.82 |
| 8 | 9 | o | Connor Howe | Canada | 1:45.93 | +2.28 |
| 9 | 3 | i | Kazuya Yamada | Japan | 1:46.36 | +2.71 |
| 10 | 3 | o | Didrik Eng Strand | Norway | 1:46.38 | +2.73 |
| 11 | 4 | i | Stefan Emele | Germany | 1:46.62 | +2.97 |
| 12 | 1 | o | Bart Swings | Belgium | 1:46.84 | +3.19 |
| 13 | 5 | i | Ryota Kojima | Japan | 1:46.97 | +3.32 |
| 14 | 2 | o | Kristian Gamme Ulekleiv | Norway | 1:47.26 | +3.61 |
| 15 | 4 | o | David La Rue | Canada | 1:47.31 | +3.66 |
| 16 | 9 | i | Joep Wennemars | Netherlands | 1:47.32 | +3.67 |
| 17 | 8 | i | Tijmen Snel | Netherlands | 1:47.36 | +3.71 |
| 18 | 2 | i | Riku Tsuchiya | Japan | 1:47.38 | +3.73 |
| 19 | 1 | i | Alessio Trentini | Italy | 1:48.04 | +4.39 |
| 20 | 7 | i | Wesly Dijs | Netherlands | 2:57.54 | +1:13.89 |

==== 5000 m ====
The race started on 23 November 2024 at 13:56.

| Rank | Pair | Lane | Name | Country | Time | Diff |
|---|---|---|---|---|---|---|
| 1st place, gold medalist(s) | 6 | i | Davide Ghiotto | Italy | 6:12.71; TR | |
| 2nd place, silver medalist(s) | 7 | i | Beau Snellink | Netherlands | 6:13.99 | +1.28 |
| 3rd place, bronze medalist(s) | 8 | o | Sander Eitrem | Norway | 6:15.71 | +3.00 |
| 4 | 5 | i | Graeme Fish | Canada | 6:17.33 | +4.62 |
| 5 | 7 | o | Bart Swings | Belgium | 6:18.77 | +6.06 |
| 6 | 4 | o | Ted-Jan Bloemen | Canada | 6:20.10 | +7.39 |
| 7 | 5 | o | Michele Malfatti | Italy | 6:21.05 | +8.34 |
| 8 | 8 | i | Casey Dawson | United States | 6:21.35 | +8.64 |
| 9 | 6 | o | Chris Huizinga | Netherlands | 6:22.81 | +10.10 |
| 10 | 4 | i | Seitaro Ichinohe | Japan | 6:23.07 | +10.36 |
| 11 | 3 | i | Peder Kongshaug | Norway | 6:24.09 | +11.38 |
| 12 | 2 | i | Wu Yu | China | 6:26.58 | +13.87 |
| 13 | 1 | o | Hallgeir Engebråten | Norway | 6:27.49 | +14.78 |
| 14 | 1 | i | Sigurd Henriksen | Norway | 6:28.40 | +15.69 |
| 15 | 2 | o | Kristian Gamme Ulekleiv | Norway | 6:28.62 | +15.91 |
| 16 | 3 | o | Shomu Sasaki | Japan | 6:31.99 | +19.28 |

==== Mass start ====
The race started on 24 November 2024 at 15:32.

| Rank | Name | Country | Points | Time |
|---|---|---|---|---|
| 1st place, gold medalist(s) | Timothy Loubineaud | France | 63 | 7:52.12 |
| 2nd place, silver medalist(s) | Daniele Di Stefano | Italy | 40 | 7:54.35 |
| 3rd place, bronze medalist(s) | Bart Hoolwerf | Netherlands | 20 | 7:54.37 |
| 4 | Andrea Giovannini | Italy | 10 | 7:54.42 |
| 5 | Bart Swings | Belgium | 6 | 7:54.56 |
| 6 | Fridtjof Petzold | Germany | 4 | 8:02.86 |
| 7 | Livio Wenger | Switzerland | 3 | 7:54.58 |
| 8 | Didrik Eng Strand | Norway | 3 | 8:12.42 |
| 9 | Jorrit Bergsma | Netherlands | 2 | 7:57.30 |
| 10 | Szymon Palka | Poland | 2 | 8:03.31 |
| 11 | Felix Maly | Germany | 2 | 8:19.12 |
| 12 | Kotaro Kasahara | Japan | 1 | 7:58.35 |
| 13 | Peter Michael | New Zealand | 1 | 8:01.50 |
| 14 | Lee Seung-hoon | South Korea | | 7:54.59 |
| 15 | Ethan Cepuran | United States | | 7:54.88 |
| 16 | Gabriel Odor | Austria | | 7:55.00 |
| 17 | Hayden Mayeur | Canada | | 7:55.11 |
| 18 | Jonathan Tobon | United States | | 7:55.80 |
| 19 | Allan Dahl Johansson | Norway | | 7:57.65 |
| 20 | Shomu Sasaki | Japan | | 8:35.66 |

==== Team pursuit ====
The race started on 24 November 2024 at 13:27.

| Rank | Pair | Lane | Country | Time | Diff |
|---|---|---|---|---|---|
| 1st place, gold medalist(s) | 2 | s | Italy; Davide Ghiotto; Michele Malfatti; Andrea Giovannini | 3:39.82 | |
| 2nd place, silver medalist(s) | 3 | s | United States; Casey Dawson; Emery Lehman; Ethan Cepuran | 3:41.83 | +2.01 |
| 3rd place, bronze medalist(s) | 3 | c | Norway; Sander Eitrem; Peder Kongshaug; Hallgeir Engebråten | 3:42.31 | +2.49 |
| 4 | 1 | c | Canada; Connor Howe; Ted-Jan Bloemen; Hayden Mayeur | 3:44.58 | +4.76 |
| 5 | 2 | c | Netherlands; Joep Wennemars; Beau Snellink; Chris Huizinga | 3:45.13 | +5.31 |
| 6 | 1 | s | China; Liu Hanbin; Wu Yu; Cong Zhenlong | 3:47.67 | +7.85 |

=== Women's events ===
==== 1st 500 m ====
The race started on 22 November 2024 at 14:00.

| Rank | Pair | Lane | Name | Country | Time | Diff |
|---|---|---|---|---|---|---|
| 1st place, gold medalist(s) | 5 | i | Yukino Yoshida | Japan | 37.74 | |
| 2nd place, silver medalist(s) | 3 | o | Andżelika Wójcik | Poland | 37.92 | +0.18 |
| 3rd place, bronze medalist(s) | 4 | o | Kim Min-sun | South Korea | 37.93 | +0.19 |
| 4 | 10 | i | Kimi Goetz | United States | 37.95 | +0.21 |
| 5 | 5 | o | Kurumi Inagawa | Japan | 38.01 | +0.27 |
| 6 | 2 | i | Kaja Ziomek-Nogal | Poland | 38.03 | +0.29 |
| 7 | 10 | o | Jutta Leerdam | Netherlands | 38.04 | +0.30 |
| 8 | 8 | i | Dione Voskamp | Netherlands | 38.07 | +0.33 |
| 9 | 9 | i | Erin Jackson | United States | 38.17 | +0.43 |
| 10 | 4 | i | Tian Ruining | China | 38.18 | +0.44 |
| 11 | 8 | o | Brittany Bowe | United States | 38.26 | +0.52 |
| 12 | 6 | o | Naomi Verkerk | Netherlands | 38.29 | +0.55 |
| 13 | 3 | i | Rio Yamada | Japan | 38.33 | +0.59 |
| 14 | 6 | i | Suzanne Schulting | Netherlands | 38.51 | +0.77 |
| 15 | 7 | o | Carolina Hiller | Canada | 38.52 | +0.78 |
| 16 | 7 | i | Vanessa Herzog | Austria | 38.53 | +0.79 |
| 17 | 2 | o | Lee Na-hyun | South Korea | 38.59 | +0.85 |
| 18 | 9 | o | Michelle de Jong | Netherlands | 38.82 | +1.08 |
| 19 | 1 | o | Martyna Baran | Poland | 38.88 | +1.14 |
| 20 | 1 | i | Kako Yamane | Japan | 38.99 | +1.25 |

==== 2nd 500 m ====
The race started on 24 November 2024 at 14:00.

| Rank | Pair | Lane | Name | Country | Time | Diff |
|---|---|---|---|---|---|---|
| 1st place, gold medalist(s) | 6 | i | Erin Jackson | United States | 37.78 | |
| 2nd place, silver medalist(s) | 7 | o | Dione Voskamp | Netherlands | 37.84 | +0.06 |
| 3rd place, bronze medalist(s) | 10 | i | Kimi Goetz | United States | 37.98 | +0.20 |
| 4 | 8 | i | Yukino Yoshida | Japan | 37.99 | +0.21 |
| 5 | 6 | o | Tian Ruining | China | 38.04 | +0.26 |
| 6 | 5 | o | Naomi Verkerk | Netherlands | 38.06 | +0.28 |
| 7 | 3 | i | Suzanne Schulting | Netherlands | 38.09 | +0.31 |
| 8 | 9 | i | Andżelika Wójcik | Poland | 38.18 | +0.40 |
| 9 | 8 | o | Kim Min-sun | South Korea | 38.20 | +0.42 |
| 10 | 10 | o | Kurumi Inagawa | Japan | 38.22 | +0.44 |
| 11 | 5 | i | Brittany Bowe | United States | 38.25 | +0.47 |
| 12 | 3 | o | Carolina Hiller | Canada | 38.27 | +0.49 |
| 13 | 7 | i | Jutta Leerdam | Netherlands | 38.28 | +0.50 |
| 14 | 2 | o | Lee Nah-yun | South Korea | 38.40 | +0.62 |
| 15 | 4 | o | Kristina Silaeva | Kazakhstan | 38.47 | +0.69 |
| 16 | 2 | i | Vanessa Herzog | Austria | 38.50 | +0.72 |
| 17 | 1 | o | Serena Pergher | Italy | 38.76 | +0.98 |
| 18 | 4 | i | Rio Yamada | Japan | 38.76 | +0.98 |
| 19 | 1 | i | Chen Ying-Chu | Chinese Taipei | 38.89 | +1.11 |
| | 9 | o | Kaja Ziomek-Nogal | Poland | Disqualified | |

==== 1000 m ====
The race started on 23 November 2024 at 15:14.

| Rank | Pair | Lane | Name | Country | Time | Diff |
|---|---|---|---|---|---|---|
| 1st place, gold medalist(s) | 8 | i | Miho Takagi | Japan | 1:14.60 | |
| 2nd place, silver medalist(s) | 9 | o | Jutta Leerdam | Netherlands | 1:14.96 | +0.36 |
| 3rd place, bronze medalist(s) | 9 | i | Brittany Bowe | United States | 1:15.17 | +0.57 |
| 4 | 10 | i | Angel Daleman | Netherlands | 1:15.51 | +0.91 |
| 5 | 10 | o | Kimi Goetz | United States | 1:15.56 | +0.96 |
| 6 | 6 | i | Han Mei | China | 1:15.57 | +0.97 |
| 7 | 8 | o | Antoinette Rijpma-de Jong | Netherlands | 1:15.88 | +1.28 |
| 8 | 7 | i | Suzanne Schulting | Netherlands | 1:15.89 | +1.29 |
| 9 | 5 | o | Rio Yamada | Japan | 1:16.15 | +1.55 |
| 10 | 7 | o | Ivanie Blondin | Canada | 1:16.18 | +1.58 |
| 11 | 4 | i | Nadezhda Morozova | Kazakhstan | 1:16.38 | +1.78 |
| 12 | 3 | i | Vanessa Herzog | Austria | 1:16.52 | +1.92 |
| 13 | 2 | o | Kim Min-sun | South Korea | 1:16.62 | +2.02 |
| 14 | 4 | o | Natalia Jabrzyk | Poland | 1:16.93 | +2.33 |
| 15 | 3 | o | Béatrice Lamarche | Canada | 1:17.12 | +2.52 |
| 16 | 2 | i | Ayano Sato | Japan | 1:17.16 | +2.56 |
| 17 | 1 | o | Lee Na-hyun | South Korea | 1:17.63 | +3.03 |
| 18 | 5 | i | Mia Manganello | United States | 1:17.90 | +3.30 |
| 19 | 6 | o | Greta Myers | United States | 1:17.98 | +3.38 |
| 20 | 1 | i | Kristina Silaeva | Kazakhstan | 1:19.14 | +4.54 |

==== 1500 m ====
The race started on 22 November 2024 at 15:07.

| Rank | Pair | Lane | Name | Country | Time | Diff |
|---|---|---|---|---|---|---|
| 1st place, gold medalist(s) | 10 | o | Miho Takagi | Japan | 1:55.02 | |
| 2nd place, silver medalist(s) | 7 | o | Han Mei | China | 1:55.18 | +0.16 |
| 3rd place, bronze medalist(s) | 9 | i | Joy Beune | Netherlands | 1:55.58 | +0.56 |
| 4 | 10 | i | Antoinette Rijpma-de Jong | Netherlands | 1:55.64 | +0.62 |
| 5 | 6 | i | Ivanie Blondin | Canada | 1:55.65 | +0.63 |
| 6 | 8 | o | Brittany Bowe | United States | 1:55.77 | +0.75 |
| 7 | 9 | o | Marijke Groenewoud | Netherlands | 1:56.60 | +1.58 |
| 8 | 7 | i | Angel Daleman | Netherlands | 1:56.95 | +1.93 |
| 9 | 3 | i | Valérie Maltais | Canada | 1:57.26 | +2.24 |
| 10 | 2 | i | Yang Binyu | China | 1:57.30 | +2.28 |
| 11 | 5 | i | Melissa Wijfje | Netherlands | 1:57.85 | +2.83 |
| 12 | 2 | o | Isabelle van Elst | Belgium | 1:57.93 | +2.91 |
| 13 | 4 | i | Ragne Wiklund | Norway | 1:57.94 | +2.92 |
| 14 | 5 | o | Momoka Horikawa | Japan | 1:57.97 | +2.95 |
| 15 | 8 | i | Kimi Goetz | United States | 1:58.13 | +3.11 |
| 16 | 3 | o | Kaitlyn McGregor | Switzerland | 1:58.19 | +3.17 |
| 17 | 4 | o | Ayano Sato | Japan | 1:58.42 | +3.40 |
| 18 | 1 | i | Rin Kosaka | Japan | 1:59.42 | +4.40 |
| 19 | 6 | o | Greta Myers | United States | 1:59.44 | +4.42 |
| 20 | 1 | o | Anna Kubo | Japan | 2:00.57 | +5.55 |

==== 3000 m ====
The race started on 23 November 2024 at 13:00.

| Rank | Pair | Lane | Name | Country | Time | Diff |
|---|---|---|---|---|---|---|
| 1st place, gold medalist(s) | 3 | i | Ivanie Blondin | Canada | 4:03.76 | |
| 2nd place, silver medalist(s) | 5 | o | Ragne Wiklund | Norway | 4:04.60 | +0.84 |
| 3rd place, bronze medalist(s) | 7 | o | Joy Beune | Netherlands | 4:04.60 | +0.84 |
| 4 | 7 | i | Martina Sábliková | Czech Republic | 4:04.87 | +1.11 |
| 5 | 3 | o | Valérie Maltais | Canada | 4:05.03 | +1.27 |
| 6 | 8 | o | Marijke Groenewoud | Netherlands | 4:05.13 | +1.37 |
| 7 | 8 | i | Sanne In 't Hof | Netherlands | 4:06.14 | +2.38 |
| 8 | 4 | i | Momoka Horikawa | Japan | 4:06.39 | +2.63 |
| 9 | 4 | o | Isabelle Weidemann | Canada | 4:07.04 | +3.28 |
| 10 | 2 | i | Yang Binyu | China | 4:07.63 | +3.87 |
| 11 | 6 | i | Merel Conijn | Netherlands | 4:08.52 | +4.76 |
| 12 | 1 | o | Han Mei | China | 4:10.20 | +6.44 |
| 13 | 2 | o | Laura Hall | Canada | 4:12.52 | +8.76 |
| 14 | 5 | i | Greta Myers | United States | 4:12.55 | +8.79 |
| 15 | 6 | o | Elisa Dul | Netherlands | 4:12.91 | +9.15 |
| 16 | 1 | i | Yuka Takahashi | Japan | 4:14.82 | +11.06 |

==== Mass start ====
The race started on 24 November 2024 at 15:11.

| Rank | Name | Country | Points | Time |
|---|---|---|---|---|
| 1st place, gold medalist(s) | Marijke Groenewoud | Netherlands | 60 | 8:36.64 |
| 2nd place, silver medalist(s) | Ivanie Blondin | Canada | 40 | 8:36.71 |
| 3rd place, bronze medalist(s) | Elisa Dul | Netherlands | 21 | 8:37.36 |
| 4 | Francesca Lollobrigida | Italy | 10 | 8:37.75 |
| 5 | Mia Manganello | United States | 6 | 8:37.81 |
| 6 | Yang Binyu | China | 3 | 8:37.84 |
| 7 | Valérie Maltais | Canada | 3 | 8:38.68 |
| 8 | Ramona Härdi | Switzerland | 3 | 8:41.97 |
| 9 | Greta Myers | United States | 3 | 8:50.48 |
| 10 | Park Ji-woo | South Korea | 2 | 8:37.84 |
| 11 | Kaitlyn McGregor | Switzerland | 2 | 8:40.14 |
| 12 | Michelle Uhrig | Germany | 2 | 8:40.38 |
| 13 | Sandrine Tas | Belgium | 1 | 8:38.96 |
| 14 | Josie Hofmann | Germany | 1 | 8:48.83 |
| 15 | Momoka Horikawa | Japan | | 8:38.84 |
| 16 | Natalia Jabrzyk | Poland | | 8:41.61 |
| 17 | Zuzana Kuršová | Czech Republic | | 8:43.91 |
| 18 | Alice Marletti | Italy | | 8:44.07 |
| 19 | Olga Piotrowska | Poland | | 8:15.48 |
| 20 | Jin Wenjing | China | | 6:12.83 |
| 21 | Momoka Horikawa | Japan | | 8:47.12 |
| 22 | Olga Piotrowska | Poland | | 7:30.04 |

==== Team pursuit ====
The race started on 24 November 2024 at 13:00.

| Rank | Pair | Lane | Country | Time | Diff |
|---|---|---|---|---|---|
| 1st place, gold medalist(s) | 1 | c | Netherlands; Joy Beune; Antoinette Rijpma-de Jong; Marijke Groenewoud | 2:56.80 | |
| 2nd place, silver medalist(s) | 3 | s | Japan; Miho Takagi; Momoka Horikawa; Ayano Sato | 2:58.12 | +1.32 |
| 3rd place, bronze medalist(s) | 2 | c | United States; Brittany Bowe; Mia Manganello; Greta Myers | 3:01.01 | +4.21 |
| 4 | 1 | s | China; Han Mei; Yang Binyu; Adake Ahenaer | 3:02.11 | +5.31 |
| 5 | 3 | c | Canada; Valérie Maltais; Ivanie Blondin; Isabelle Weidemann | 3:02.17 | +5.37 |
| 6 | 2 | s | Poland; Olga Piotrowska; Natalia Jabrzyk; Karolina Bosiek | 3:04.99 | +8.19 |

=== Mixed events ===
==== Mixed relay ====
The race started on 24 November 2024 at 16:00.

| Rank | Heat | Country | Time | Diff |
|---|---|---|---|---|
| 1st place, gold medalist(s) | 2 | South Korea; Kim Min-sun; Oh Hyun-min | 2:57.29 | |
| 2nd place, silver medalist(s) | 2 | Belgium; Robbe Beelen; Fran Vanhoutte | 2:59.42 | +2.13 |
| 3rd place, bronze medalist(s) | 3 | Canada; Ivanie Blondin; Yankun Zhao | 3:00.44 | +3.15 |
| 4 | 1 | Germany; Anna Ostlender; Moritz Klein | 3:00.95 | +3.66 |
| 5 | 3 | China; Sun Chuanyi; Chen Aoyu | 3:01.66 | +4.37 |
| 6 | 3 | Poland; Iga Wojtasik; Jakub Piotrowski | 3:02.90 | +5.61 |
| 7 | 1 | Czech Republic; Katarina Kainová; Jakub Kočí | 3:12.38 | +15.09 |
| | 1 | Italy; Arianna Fontana; Francesco Betti | Disqualified | |
| | 2 | Netherlands; Angel Daleman; Wesly Dijs | Disqualified | |
