= 2023–24 ISU Speed Skating World Cup – World Cup 5 =

Ice skating competition in Salt Lake City, United States

2023–24 ISU Speed Skating World Cup 5
- Venue: Utah Olympic Oval; Salt Lake City; United States
- Dates: 26 — 28 January 2024

The fifth competition weekend of the 2023–24 ISU Speed Skating World Cup is being held at the Utah Olympic Oval in Salt Lake City, United States, from Friday, 26 January, until Sunday, 28 January 2024.

== Medal summary ==
=== Men's events ===
Event	Gold	Time	Silver	Time	Bronze	Time	Report
500 m	Jordan Stolz; United States	33.96	Laurent Dubreuil; Canada	34.05	Yuma Murakami; Japan	34.16	
1000 m (1)	Jordan Stolz; United States	1:05.37; WR; TR	Ning Zhongyan; China	1:06.97	David Bosa; Italy	1:07.06	
1000 m (2)	Jordan Stolz; United States	1:06.32	Tim Prins; Netherlands	1:06.40	Tatsuya Shinhama; Japan	1:06.72	
1500 m	Jordan Stolz; United States	1:40.87	Ning Zhongyan; China	1:41.78	Wesly Dijs; Netherlands	1:42.77	
5000 m	Patrick Roest; Netherlands	6:02.98	Davide Ghiotto; Italy	6:04.23	Ted-Jan Bloemen; Canada	6:06.88	
Mass start^{A}	Chung Jae-won; South Korea	60	Bart Swings; Belgium	41	Bart Hoolwerf; Netherlands	20	
Team pursuit	United States; Casey Dawson; Emery Lehman; Ethan Cepuran	3:33.66; WR; TR	Norway; Sander Eitrem; Peder Kongshaug; Sverre Lunde Pedersen	3:35.30	Italy; Andrea Giovannini; Davide Ghiotto; Michele Malfatti	3:36.69	

^{A} In mass start, race points are accumulated during the race based on results of the intermediate sprints and the final sprint. The skater with most race points is the winner.

=== Women's events ===
Event	Gold	Time	Silver	Time	Bronze	Time	Report
500 m	Erin Jackson; United States	36.90	Kimi Goetz; United States	37.08	Kim Min-sun; South Korea	37.22	
1000 m (1)	Miho Takagi; Japan	1:12.77	Kimi Goetz; United States	1:12.85	Han Mei; China	1:13.64	
1000 m (2)	Kimi Goetz; United States	1:13.08	Jutta Leerdam; Netherlands	1:13.17	Femke Kok; Netherlands	1:13.21	
1500 m	Miho Takagi; Japan	1:51.60	Antoinette Rijpma-de Jong; Netherlands	1:52.04	Joy Beune; Netherlands	1:52.23	
3000 m	Joy Beune; Netherlands	3:56.86	Irene Schouten; Netherlands	3:58.20	Valérie Maltais; Canada	3:59.71	
Mass start^{A}	Ivanie Blondin; Canada	60	Irene Schouten; Netherlands	43	Valérie Maltais; Canada	20	
Team pursuit	Canada; Valérie Maltais; Isabelle Weidemann; Ivanie Blondin	2:54.07	Japan; Yuna Onodera; Ayano Sato; Momoka Horikawa	2:55.51	United States; Brittany Bowe; Mia Manganello; Giorgia Birkeland	2:57.66	

^{A} In mass start, race points are accumulated during the race based on results of the intermediate sprints and the final sprint. The skater with most race points is the winner.

=== Mixed events ===
Event	Gold	Time	Silver	Time	Bronze	Time	Report
Mixed gender relay	China; Sun Chuanyi; Jin Wenjing	2:54.90; WR; TR	Germany; Hendrik Dombek; Anna Ostlender	2:56.02	South Korea; Yang Ho-jun; Lee Nah-yun	2:56.20	

== Results ==
=== Men's events ===
==== 500 m ====
The race started on 27 January 2024 at 16:02.

Rank	Pair	Lane	Name	Country	Time	Diff
1st place, gold medalist(s)	5	o	Jordan Stolz	United States	33.96	
2nd place, silver medalist(s)	10	i	Laurent Dubreuil	Canada	34.05	+0.09
3rd place, bronze medalist(s)	10	o	Yuma Murakami	Japan	34.16	+0.20
4	9	o	Kim Jun-ho	South Korea	34.18	+0.22
5	1	o	Jenning de Boo	Netherlands	34.21	+0.25
6	2	o	Cooper McLeod	United States	34.24	+0.28
7	5	i	Marek Kania	Poland	34.29	+0.33
8	8	o	Tatsuya Shinhama	Japan	34.32	+0.36
9	7	o	Janno Botman	Netherlands	34.35	+0.39
10	9	i	Wataru Morishige	Japan	34.36	+0.40
11	1	i	Marten Liiv	Estonia	34.39	+0.43
11	7	i	Yudai Yamamoto	Japan	34.39	+0.43
13	4	o	David Bosa	Italy	34.47	+0.51
14	3	i	Piotr Michalski	Poland	34.57	+0.61
14	8	i	Damian Żurek	Poland	34.57	+0.61
16	2	i	Hein Otterspeer	Netherlands	34.59	+0.63
17	3	o	Du Haonan	China	34.59	+0.63
18	6	i	Nil Llop	Spain	34.63	+0.67
19	4	i	Bjørn Magnussen	Norway	34.63	+0.67
20	6	o	Håvard Holmefjord Lorentzen	Norway	34.70	+0.74

==== 1st 1000 m ====
The race started on 26 January 2024 at 15:05.

Rank	Pair	Lane	Name	Country	Time	Diff
1st place, gold medalist(s)	7	i	Jordan Stolz	United States	1:05.37; WR; TR	
2nd place, silver medalist(s)	9	o	Ning Zhongyan	China	1:06.97	+1.60
3rd place, bronze medalist(s)	5	o	David Bosa	Italy	1:07.06	+1.69
4	5	i	Marten Liiv	Estonia	1:07.15	+1.78
5	6	o	Tim Prins	Netherlands	1:07.20	+1.83
6	9	i	Håvard Holmefjord Lorentzen	Norway	1:07.28	+1.91
7	4	o	Jenning de Boo	Netherlands	1:07.37	+2.00
8	7	o	Damian Żurek	Poland	1:07.45	+2.08
9	1	o	Matias Vosté	Belgium	1:07.47	+2.10
10	6	i	Moritz Klein	Germany	1:07.71	+2.34
11	8	o	Taiyo Nonomura	Japan	1:07.75	+2.38
12	2	o	Connor Howe	Canada	1:07.84	+2.47
13	1	i	Peder Kongshaug	Norway	1:07.92	+2.55
14	2	i	Cooper McLeod	Canada	1:08.03	+2.66
15	10	i	Masaya Yamada	Japan	1:08.05	+2.68
16	3	i	Hendrik Dombek	Germany	1:08.09	+2.72
17	10	o	Kazuya Yamada	Japan	1:08.18	+2.81
18	3	o	Vincent De Haître	Canada	1:08.27	+2.90
19	8	i	Kjeld Nuis	Netherlands	1:15.16	+9.79
	4	i	Ryota Kojima	Japan	Did not finish	

==== 2nd 1000 m ====
The race started on 28 January 2024 at 14:35.

Rank	Pair	Lane	Name	Country	Time	Diff
1st place, gold medalist(s)	8	i	Jordan Stolz	United States	1:06.32	
2nd place, silver medalist(s)	6	o	Tim Prins	Netherlands	1:06.40	+0.08
3rd place, bronze medalist(s)	4	i	Tatsuya Shinhama	Japan	1:06.72	+0.40
4	10	i	Kjeld Nuis	Netherlands	1:06.81	+0.49
5	2	o	Conor McDermott-Mostowy	United States	1:06.91	+0.59
6	4	o	Jenning de Boo	Netherlands	1:06.95	+0.63
7	9	o	Ning Zhongyan	China	1:07.03	+0.71
8	6	i	Marten Liiv	Estonia	1:07.16	+0.84
9	8	o	Håvard Holmefjord Lorentzen	Norway	1:07.33	+1.01
10	9	i	David Bosa	Italy	1:07.42	+1.10
11	5	i	Kazuya Yamada	Japan	1:07.45	+1.13
12	1	i	Joep Wennemars	Netherlands	1:07.60	+1.28
13	10	o	Taiyo Nonomura	Japan	1:07.61	+1.29
14	7	i	Damian Żurek	Poland	1:07.64	+1.32
15	3	o	Connor Howe	Canada	1:07.76	+1.44
16	7	o	Masaya Yamada	Japan	1:07.81	+1.49
17	3	i	Hendrik Dombek	Germany	1:07.98	+1.66
18	2	i	Cooper McLeod	United States	1:08.02	+1.70
19	5	o	Moritz Klein	Germany	1:08.08	+1.76
20	1	o	Kai Verbij	Netherlands	1:08.83	+2.51

==== 1500 m ====
The race started on 27 January 2024 at 14:00.

Rank	Pair	Lane	Name	Country	Time	Diff
1st place, gold medalist(s)	9	i	Jordan Stolz	United States	1:40.87	
2nd place, silver medalist(s)	8	i	Ning Zhongyan	China	1:41.78	+0.91
3rd place, bronze medalist(s)	6	i	Wesly Dijs	Netherlands	1:42.77	+1.90
4	3	i	Connor Howe	Canada	1:42.83	+1.96
5	3	o	Seitaro Ichinohe	Japan	1:43.24	+2.37
6	10	i	Peder Kongshaug	Norway	1:43.26	+2.39
7	2	i	Alessio Trentini	Italy	1:43.48	+2.61
8	6	o	Bart Swings	Belgium	1:43.62	+2.75
9	8	o	Sander Eitrem	Norway	1:43.81	+2.94
9	9	o	Kazuya Yamada	Japan	1:43.81	+2.94
11	7	o	Hendrik Dombek	Germany	1:44.25	+3.38
12	2	o	Vincent De Haître	Canada	1:44.30	+3.43
13	4	i	Taiyo Nonomura	Japan	1:44.37	+3.50
14	10	o	Patrick Roest	Netherlands	1:44.44	+3.57
15	4	o	Antoine Gélinas-Beaulieu	Canada	1:44.50	+3.63
16	1	o	Allan Dahl Johansson	Norway	1:44.83	+3.96
17	1	i	Stefan Emele	Germany	1:44.90	+4.03
18	5	i	Masaya Yamada	Japan	1:45.04	+4.17
19	5	o	Riku Tsuchiya	Japan	1:45.27	+4.40
20	7	i	Hallgeir Engebråten	Norway	1:45.60	+4.73

==== 5000 m ====
The race started on 28 January 2024 at 15:18.

Rank	Pair	Lane	Name	Country	Time	Diff
1st place, gold medalist(s)	8	i	Patrick Roest	Netherlands	6:02.98	
2nd place, silver medalist(s)	8	o	Davide Ghiotto	Italy	6:04.23	+1.25
3rd place, bronze medalist(s)	7	i	Ted-Jan Bloemen	Canada	6:06.88	+3.90
4	5	o	Sander Eitrem	Norway	6:07.73	+4.75
5	7	o	Michele Malfatti	Italy	6:10.97	+7.99
6	5	i	Bart Swings	Belgium	6:12.58	+9.60
7	4	i	Wu Yu	China	6:13.09	+10.11
8	6	o	Hallgeir Engebråten	Norway	6:13.51	+10.53
9	4	o	Casey Dawson	United States	6:14.72	+11.74
10	6	i	Sverre Lunde Pedersen	Norway	6:16.25	+13.27
11	3	i	Seitaro Ichinohe	Japan	6:17.87	+14.89
12	3	o	Sigurd Henriksen	Norway	6:18.57	+15.59
13	1	i	Marcel Bosker	Netherlands	6:21.72	+18.74
14	2	i	Riku Tsuchiya	Japan	6:22.61	+19.63
15	1	o	Jordan Stolz	United States	6:25.28	+22.30
16	2	o	Jesse Speijers	Netherlands	6:25.48	+22.50

==== Mass start ====
The race started on 26 January 2024 at 16:52.

Rank	Name	Country	Points	Time
1st place, gold medalist(s)	Chung Jae-won	South Korea	60	7:42.35
2nd place, silver medalist(s)	Bart Swings	Belgium	41	7:42.40
3rd place, bronze medalist(s)	Bart Hoolwerf	Netherlands	20	7:42.77
4	Livio Wenger	Switzerland	10	7:42.79
5	Kota Kikuchi	Japan	6	7:42.82
6	Timothy Loubineaud	France	6	7:58.89
7	Kristian Gamme Ulekleiv	Norway	4	8:12.41
8	Andrea Giovannini	Italy	3	7:42.88
9	Daniele Di Stefano	Italy	3	7:47.90
10	Conor McDermott-Mostowy	United States	2	8:01.78
11	Peter Michael	New Zealand	1	7:56.10
12	Connor Howe	Canada	1	7:58.20
13	Lee Seung-hoon	South Korea		7:43.03
14	Gabriel Odor	Austria		7:43.99
15	Vitaliy Chshigolev	Kazakhstan		7:45.58
16	Artur Janicki	Poland		7:45.92
17	Ethan Cepuran	United States		7:47.82
18	Marcel Bosker	Netherlands		8:20.87
19	Antoine Gélinas-Beaulieu	Canada		8:25.37
20	Allan Dahl Johansson	Norway		6:54.93

==== Team pursuit ====
The race started on 27 January 2024 at 16:41.

Rank	Pair	Lane	Country	Time	Diff
1st place, gold medalist(s)	2	c	United States; Casey Dawson; Emery Lehman; Ethan Cepuran	3:33.66; WR; TR	
2nd place, silver medalist(s)	2	s	Norway; Sander Eitrem; Peder Kongshaug; Sverre Lunde Pedersen	3:35.30	+1.64
3rd place, bronze medalist(s)	3	c	Italy; Andrea Giovannini; Davide Ghiotto; Michele Malfatti	3:36.69	+3.03
4	1	s	Netherlands; Chris Huizinga; Beau Snellink; Bart Hoolwerf	3:38.35	+4.69
5	3	s	China; Wang Shuaihan; Wu Yu; Sun Chuanyi	3:41.95	+8.29
6	1	c	Belgium; Bart Swings; Indra Medard; Jason Suttels	3:43.38	+9.72

=== Women's events ===
==== 500 m ====
The race started on 27 January 2024 at 14:41.

Rank	Pair	Lane	Name	Country	Time	Diff
1st place, gold medalist(s)	8	o	Erin Jackson	United States	36.90	
2nd place, silver medalist(s)	9	o	Kimi Goetz	United States	37.08	+0.18
3rd place, bronze medalist(s)	9	i	Kim Min-sun	South Korea	37.22	+0.32
4	10	i	Femke Kok	Netherlands	37.26	+0.36
5	3	o	Lee Na-hyun	South Korea	37.34	+0.44
6	10	o	Kurumi Inagawa	Japan	37.36	+0.46
7	7	i	Vanessa Herzog	Austria	37.50	+0.60
8	8	i	Marrit Fledderus	Netherlands	37.59	+0.69
9	4	i	Tian Ruining	China	37.60	+0.70
10	5	i	Rio Yamada	Japan	37.65	+0.75
11	5	o	Jutta Leerdam	Netherlands	37.70	+0.80
12	7	o	Andżelika Wójcik	Poland	37.83	+0.93
13	2	o	Kako Yamane	Japan	38.00	+1.10
14	1	o	Yekaterina Aydova	Kazakhstan	38.02	+1.12
15	3	i	Carolina Hiller	Canada	38.07	+1.17
16	2	i	Karolina Bosiek	Poland	38.09	+1.19
17	6	i	Yukino Yoshida	Japan	38.17	+1.27
18	4	o	Sarah Warren	United States	38.21	+1.31
19	6	o	Naomi Verkerk	Netherlands	38.24	+1.34
20	1	i	Martyna Baran	Poland	38.65	+1.75

==== 1st 1000 m ====
The race started on 26 January 2024 at 14:30.

Rank	Pair	Lane	Name	Country	Time	Diff
1st place, gold medalist(s)	10	o	Miho Takagi	Japan	1:12.77	
2nd place, silver medalist(s)	9	i	Kimi Goetz	United States	1:12.85	+0.08
3rd place, bronze medalist(s)	10	i	Han Mei	China	1:13.64	+0.87
4	8	i	Brittany Bowe	United States	1:14.01	+1.24
5	5	i	Antoinette Rijpma-de Jong	Netherlands	1:14.11	+1.34
6	6	i	Ayano Sato	Japan	1:14.19	+1.42
7	5	o	Rio Yamada	Japan	1:14.27	+1.50
8	3	o	Erin Jackson	United States	1:14.35	+1.58
9	1	o	Isabel Grevelt	Netherlands	1:14.41	+1.64
10	6	o	Femke Kok	Netherlands	1:14.42	+1.65
11	8	o	Jutta Leerdam	Netherlands	1:14.65	+1.88
12	4	i	Yekaterina Aydova	Kazakhstan	1:15.00	+2.23
13	7	i	Karolina Bosiek	Poland	1:15.10	+2.33
14	7	o	Ellia Smeding	United Kingdom	1:15.14	+2.37
15	3	i	Lee Na-hyun	South Korea	1:15.31	+2.54
16	1	i	Naomi Verkerk	Netherlands	1:15.32	+2.55
17	2	o	Sumire Kikuchi	Japan	1:15.48	+2.71
18	2	i	Maddison Pearman	Canada	1:16.27	+3.50
19	4	o	Alina Dauranova	Kazakhstan	1:17.38	+4.61
20	9	o	Ivanie Blondin	Canada	1:19.20	+6.43

==== 2nd 1000 m ====
The race started on 28 January 2024 at 14:00.

Rank	Pair	Lane	Name	Country	Time	Diff
1st place, gold medalist(s)	9	o	Kimi Goetz	United States	1:13.08	
2nd place, silver medalist(s)	8	i	Jutta Leerdam	Netherlands	1:13.17	+0.09
3rd place, bronze medalist(s)	5	i	Femke Kok	Netherlands	1:13.21	+0.13
4	9	i	Brittany Bowe	United States	1:13.32	+0.24
5	3	i	Kim Min-sun	South Korea	1:13.42	+0.34
6	8	o	Antoinette Rijpma-de Jong	Netherlands	1:13.82	+0.74
7	6	o	Rio Yamada	Japan	1:13.95	+0.87
8	10	o	Han Mei	China	1:14.25	+1.17
9	7	o	Ellia Smeding	United Kingdom	1:14.47	+1.39
10	7	i	Ayano Sato	Japan	1:14.49	+1.41
11	1	i	Vanessa Herzog	Austria	1:14.56	+1.48
12	10	i	Ivanie Blondin	Canada	1:14.60	+1.52
13	4	i	Yekaterina Aydova	Kazakhstan	1:14.84	+1.76
14	6	i	Karolina Bosiek	Poland	1:15.31	+2.23
15	1	o	Sarah Warren	United States	1:15.54	+2.46
16	5	o	Erin Jackson	United States	1:15.59	+2.51
17	2	o	Tian Ruining	China	1:15.68	+2.60
18	2	i	Alina Dauranova	Kazakhstan	1:16.21	+3.13
19	4	o	Lee Na-hyun	South Korea	1:16.33	+3.25
20	3	o	Maddison Pearman	Canada	1:16.35	+3.27

==== 1500 m ====
The race started on 27 January 2024 at 15:20.

Rank	Pair	Lane	Name	Country	Time	Diff
1st place, gold medalist(s)	9	o	Miho Takagi	Japan	1:51.60	
2nd place, silver medalist(s)	9	i	Antoinette Rijpma-de Jong	Netherlands	1:52.04	+0.44
3rd place, bronze medalist(s)	7	o	Joy Beune	Netherlands	1:52.23	+0.63
4	8	o	Han Mei	China	1:52.95	+1.35
5	10	o	Marijke Groenewoud	Netherlands	1:53.17	+1.57
6	7	i	Ivanie Blondin	Canada	1:53.33	+1.73
7	8	i	Kimi Goetz	United States	1:53.71	+2.11
8	2	o	Melissa Wijfje	Netherlands	1:53.91	+2.31
9	10	i	Brittany Bowe	United States	1:54.00	+2.40
10	6	o	Valérie Maltais	Canada	1:54.08	+2.48
11	6	i	Ayano Sato	Japan	1:54.91	+3.31
12	2	i	Sumire Kikuchi	Japan	1:55.25	+3.65
13	4	o	Kaitlyn McGregor	Switzerland	1:55.30	+3.70
14	3	o	Momoka Horikawa	Japan	1:55.42	+3.82
15	5	i	Mia Manganello	United States	1:55.48	+3.88
16	3	i	Yang Binyu	China	1:55.78	+4.18
17	4	i	Yuna Onodera	Japan	1:56.36	+4.76
18	5	o	Esther Kiel	Netherlands	1:57.31	+5.71
19	1	o	Yekaterina Aydova	Kazakhstan	1:57.92	+6.32
20	1	i	Isabelle van Elst	Belgium	1:58.24	+6.64

==== 3000 m ====
The race started on 26 January 2024 at 15:48.

Rank	Pair	Lane	Name	Country	Time	Diff
1st place, gold medalist(s)	5	i	Joy Beune	Netherlands	3:56.86	
2nd place, silver medalist(s)	4	i	Irene Schouten	Netherlands	3:58.20	+1.34
3rd place, bronze medalist(s)	8	o	Valérie Maltais	Canada	3:59.71	+2.85
4	7	i	Marijke Groenewoud	Netherlands	4:00.92	+4.06
5	8	i	Sanne in 't Hof	Netherlands	4:01.03	+4.17
6	4	o	Yang Binyu	China	4:01.32	+4.46
7	7	o	Ivanie Blondin	Canada	4:01.55	+4.69
8	2	o	Elisa Dul	Netherlands	4:02.04	+5.18
9	6	o	Ragne Wiklund	Norway	4:02.35	+5.49
10	5	o	Momoka Horikawa	Japan	4:03.38	+6.52
11	6	i	Martina Sábliková	Czech Republic	4:03.62	+6.76
12	1	i	Mia Manganello	United States	4:06.86	+10.00
13	2	i	Laura Hall	Canada	4:08.12	+11.26
14	3	i	Magdalena Czyszczoń	Poland	4:09.30	+12.44
15	3	o	Yuna Onodera	Japan	4:10.24	+13.38
16	1	o	Aurora Grinden Løvås	Norway	4:11.16	+14.30

==== Mass start ====
The race started on 28 January 2024 at 16:40.

Rank	Name	Country	Points	Time
1st place, gold medalist(s)	Ivanie Blondin	Canada	60	8:14.70
2nd place, silver medalist(s)	Irene Schouten	Netherlands	43	8:14.81
3rd place, bronze medalist(s)	Valérie Maltais	Canada	20	8:15.14
4	Yang Binyu	China	12	8:15.15
5	Marijke Groenewoud	Netherlands	6	8:15.32
6	Francesca Lollobrigida	Italy	3	8:15.48
7	Sandrine Tas	Belgium	3	8:23.79
8	Kaitlyn McGregor	Switzerland	3	8:26.49
9	Michelle Uhrig	Germany	2	8:27.32
10	Fran Vanhoutte	Belgium	2	8:35.54
11	Mia Manganello	United States	1	8:15.58
12	Aurora Grinden Løvås	Norway	1	8:23.83
13	Park Ji-woo	South Korea		8:15.72
14	Ramona Härdi	Switzerland		8:32.70
15	Magdalena Czyszczoń	Poland		8:35.73
16	Olga Piotrowska	Poland	1	7:17.03

==== Team pursuit ====
The race started on 27 January 2024 at 17:10.

Rank	Pair	Lane	Country	Time	Diff
1st place, gold medalist(s)	4	c	Canada; Valérie Maltais; Isabelle Weidemann; Ivanie Blondin	2:54.07	
2nd place, silver medalist(s)	4	s	Japan; Yuna Onodera; Ayano Sato; Momoka Horikawa	2:55.51	+1.44
3rd place, bronze medalist(s)	1	s	United States; Brittany Bowe; Mia Manganello; Giorgia Birkeland	2:57.66	+3.59
4	3	s	Poland; Olga Piotrowska; Natalia Jabrzyk; Magdalena Czyszczoń	2:58.71	+4.64
5	1	c	Italy; Francesca Lollobrigida; Veronica Luciani; Laura Lorenzato	2:58.90	+4.83
6	2	c	Germany; Lea Sophie Scholtz; Josephine Schlörb; Josie Hofmann	2:59.09	+5.02
7	3	c	China; Yang Binyu; Jin Wenjing; Tian Ruining	3:10.28	+16.21
8	2	s	Switzerland; Jasmin Güntert; Kaitlyn McGregor; Ramona Härdi	3:27.05	+32.98

=== Mixed events ===
==== Mixed relay ====
The race started on 28 January 2024 at 17:04.

Rank	Heat	Country	Time	Diff
1st place, gold medalist(s)	3	China; Sun Chuanyi; Jin Wenjing	2:54.90; WR; TR	
2nd place, silver medalist(s)	3	Germany; Hendrik Dombek; Anna Ostlender	2:56.02	+1.12
3rd place, bronze medalist(s)	2	South Korea; Yang Ho-jun; Lee Nah-yun	2:56.20	+1.30
4	2	Canada; Yankun Zhao; Ivanie Blondin	2:56.24	+1.34
5	2	Romania; Cosmin Nedelea; Bianca-Lorena Stǎnicǎ	2:56.96	+2.06
6	4	Poland; Damian Żurek; Karolina Bosiek	2:57.64	+2.74
7	4	United States; Emery Lehman; Chrysta Rands	2:57.87	+2.97
8	1	Kazakhstan; Nuraly Akzhol; Alina Dauranova	3:02.42	+7.52
9	1	Hungary; Bálint Bödei; Abigél Mercs	3:03.01	+8.11
10	3	Czech Republic; Jakub Koči; Zuzana Kuršová	3:05.53	+10.63
11	4	Netherlands; Wesly Dijs; Helga Drost	3:07.66	+12.76
	3	Norway; Allan Dahl Johansson; Martine Ripsrud	Disqualified	
	4	Italy; Daniele Di Stefano; Serena Pergher	Disqualified	
	2	Brazil; Eder Lopes Moraes; Larissa Paes	Did not finish	
