= Speed skating at the 2026 Winter Olympics – Men's 1000 metres =

Men's 1000 metres at the XXV Olympic Winter Games
- Speed skating
- Venue: Milano Speed Skating Stadium, Milan
- Date: 11 February 2026
- Competitors: 29 from 15 nations
- Winning time: 1:06.28

Medalists
1st place, gold medalist(s)		Jordan Stolz	United States
2nd place, silver medalist(s)		Jenning de Boo	Netherlands
3rd place, bronze medalist(s)		Ning Zhongyan	China

The men's 1000 m competition in speed skating at the 2026 Winter Olympics was held on 11 February, at the Milano Speed Skating Stadium in Milan. Jordan Stolz of the United States won the event, setting a new Olympic record. Jenning de Boo of the Netherlands, skating in the same pair, won silver, and Ning Zhongyan of China bronze. These were their first Olympic medals.

== Background ==
The 2022 champion, Thomas Krol, retired from competitions, as did the bronze medalist, Håvard Holmefjord Lorentzen. The silver medalist, Laurent Dubreuil, qualified for the Olympics. Before the Olympics, Jordan Stolz was leading the 1000m standings of the 2025–26 ISU Speed Skating World Cup. Joep Wennemars was the 1000m 2025 world champion. The field also included Kjeld Nuis, the 2018 champion.

== Summary ==
The early leader was Daniele Di Stefano in pair 5, until Kjeld Nuis in pair 10 and then Joep Wennemars in pair 11 improved his time by more than half a second. In pair 12, Ning Zhongyan took the lead. Then, in pair 14 Stolz set the Olympic record, and de Boo finished second, moving his teammates off the podium. In pair 15, the last one, Damian Żurek was skating with the third time for much of the distance, but then lost 0.07 to Ning and finished off the podium.

== Records ==
Prior to this competition, the existing world, Olympic and track records were as follows.

World record	Jordan Stolz (USA)	1:05.37	Salt Lake City, United States	26 January 2024
Olympic record	Gerard van Velde (NED)	1:07.18	Salt Lake City, United States	16 February 2002
Track record	Kayo Vos (NED)	1:10.87		29 November 2025

A new Olympic record was set during the competition; the previous record was set twenty years earlier and was broken by 0.90 seconds; the top two finishers were under the previous record.

Date	Round	Athlete	Country	Time	Record
11 February	Pair 14	Jordan Stolz	United States	1:06.28	OR, TR

== Results ==
Rank	Pair	Lane	Name	Country	Time	Time behind	Notes
1st place, gold medalist(s)	14	I	Jordan Stolz	United States	1:06.28		OR, TR
2nd place, silver medalist(s)	14	O	Jenning de Boo	Netherlands	1:06.78	+0.50	
3rd place, bronze medalist(s)	12	O	Ning Zhongyan	China	1:07.34	+1.06	
4	15	O	Damian Żurek	Poland	1:07.41	+1.13	
5	11	I	Joep Wennemars	Netherlands	1:07.58	+1.30	
6	10	O	Kjeld Nuis	Netherlands	1:07.65	+1.37	
7	5	O	Daniele Di Stefano	Italy	1:08.17	+1.89	
8	5	I	Laurent Dubreuil	Canada	1:08.21	+1.93	
9	12	I	Conor McDermott-Mostowy	United States	1:08.48	+2.20	
10	4	I	Koo Kyung-min	South Korea	1:08.53	+2.25	
11	6	I	Kim Min-seok	Hungary	1:08.59	+2.31	
12	13	I	Finn Sonnekalb	Germany	1:08.80	+2.52	
13	10	I	Taiyo Nonomura	Japan	1:08.87	+2.59	
14	15	I	Marten Liiv	Estonia	1:09.06	+2.78	
15	7	I	Moritz Klein	Germany	1:09.195	+2.91	
16	8	I	Hendrik Dombek	Germany	1:09.198	+2.91	
17	7	O	Mathias Vosté	Belgium	1:09.199	+2.91	
18	3	O	David La Rue	Canada	1:09.310	+3.03	
19	13	O	Cooper McLeod	United States	1:09.319	+3.03	
20	6	O	Kazuya Yamada	Japan	1:09.381	+3.10	
21	4	O	Bjørn Magnussen	Norway	1:09.384	+3.10	
22	2	I	Anders Johnson	Canada	1:09.54	+3.26	
23	8	O	Marek Kania	Poland	1:09.58	+3.30	
24	3	I	Wataru Morishige	Japan	1:09.85	+3.57	
25	9	O	Piotr Michalski	Poland	1:10.02	+3.74	
26	1	I	Francesco Betti	Italy	1:10.18	+3.90	
27	2	O	Daniel Milagros	Spain	1:11.25	+4.97	
–	11	O	Lian Ziwen	China	Disqualified		
–	9	I	Gabriel Odor	Austria	Disqualified		
