= 2024 World Single Distances Speed Skating Championships – Men's 1500 metres =

Men's 1500 metres at the 2024 World Single Distances Speed Skating Championships
- Venue: Olympic Oval
- Location: Calgary, Canada
- Dates: February 18
- Competitors: 24 from 11 nations
- Winning time: 1:41.44

Medalists
| gold medal | Jordan Stolz | United States |
| silver medal | Kjeld Nuis | Netherlands |
| bronze medal | Peder Kongshaug | Norway |

The Men's 1500 metres competition at the 2024 World Single Distances Speed Skating Championships was held on February 18, 2024.

== Results ==
The race was started at 16:04.

| Rank | Pair | Lane | Name | Country | Time | Diff |
|---|---|---|---|---|---|---|
| 1st place, gold medalist(s) | 10 | i | Jordan Stolz | United States | 1:41.44 | |
| 2nd place, silver medalist(s) | 5 | i | Kjeld Nuis | Netherlands | 1:42.66(1) | +1.22 |
| 3rd place, bronze medalist(s) | 10 | o | Peder Kongshaug | Norway | 1:42.66(7) | +1.22 |
| 4 | 11 | i | Ning Zhongyan | China | 1:42.77 | +1.33 |
| 5 | 2 | o | Daniele Di Stefano | Italy | 1:43.99 | +2.55 |
| 6 | 11 | o | Wesly Dijs | Netherlands | 1:44.02 | +2.58 |
| 7 | 6 | i | Emery Lehman | United States | 1:44.14 | +2.70 |
| 8 | 7 | i | Alessio Trentini | Italy | 1:44.15 | +2.71 |
| 9 | 9 | o | Sander Eitrem | Norway | 1:44.25 | +2.81 |
| 10 | 8 | i | Hendrik Dombek | Germany | 1:44.28 | +2.84 |
| 11 | 2 | i | Stefan Emele | Germany | 1:44.41 | +2.97 |
| 12 | 12 | i | Connor Howe | Canada | 1:44.54 | +3.10 |
| 13 | 12 | o | Patrick Roest | Netherlands | 1:44.59 | +3.15 |
| 14 | 1 | i | Mathias Vosté | Belgium | 1:44.65 | +3.21 |
| 15 | 3 | i | An Hyun-jun | South Korea | 1:44.93 | +3.49 |
| 16 | 6 | o | Antoine Gélinas-Beaulieu | Canada | 1:45.20 | +3.76 |
| 17 | 9 | i | Kazuya Yamada | Japan | 1:45.76 | +4.32 |
| 18 | 8 | o | Taiyo Nonomura | Japan | 1:45.90 | +4.46 |
| 19 | 4 | i | Vincent De Haître | Canada | 1:45.93 | +4.49 |
| 20 | 3 | o | Conor McDermott-Mostowy | United States | 1:45.97 | +4.53 |
| 21 | 1 | o | Gabriel Odor | Austria | 1:46.10 | +4.66 |
| 22 | 4 | o | Sun Chuanyi | China | 1:46.83 | +5.39 |
| 23 | 7 | o | Seitaro Ichinohe | Japan | 1:47.46 | +6.02 |
| 24 | 5 | o | Chung Jae-won | South Korea | 1:48.64 | +7.20 |
