= 2024 World Allround Speed Skating Championships – Men =

Men at the 2024 World Allround Speed Skating Championships
- Venue: Max Aicher Arena
- Location: Inzell, Germany
- Dates: 9–10 March
- Competitors: 24 from 15 nations
- Winning points: 144.740

Medalists
gold medal	Jordan Stolz	United States
silver medal	Patrick Roest	Netherlands
bronze medal	Hallgeir Engebråten	Norway

The Men competition at the 2024 World Allround Speed Skating Championships was held on 9 and 10 March 2024.

== Results ==
=== 500 m ===
The race was started on 9 March at 13:17.

Rank	Pair	Lane	Name	Country	Time	Diff
1	11	I	Jordan Stolz	United States	34.10 TR	
2	2	O	Shomu Sasaki	Japan	35.43	+1.33
3	1	I	Riku Tsuchiya	Japan	35.83	+1.73
4	12	I	Patrick Roest	Netherlands	36.06	+1.96
5	12	O	Samuli Suomalainen	Finland	36.08	+1.98
6	9	I	Chung Jae-won	South Korea	36.10	+2.00
7	8	I	Daniele Di Stefano	Italy	36.11	+2.01
8	9	O	Sverre Lunde Pedersen	Norway	36.24	+2.14
9	7	O	Bart Swings	Belgium	36.36	+2.26
10	3	I	Hallgeir Engebråten	Norway	36.37	+2.27
11	11	O	Gabriel Odor	Austria	36.44	+2.34
12	10	I	Mateusz Śliwka	Poland	36.51	+2.41
13	7	I	Nuraly Akzhol	Kazakhstan	36.57	+2.47
14	1	O	Wu Yu	China	36.80	+2.70
15	4	O	Sander Eitrem	Norway	37.06	+2.96
16	10	O	Ethan Cepuran	United States	37.07	+2.97
17	2	I	Indra Médard	Belgium	37.21	+3.11
17	8	O	Jake Weidemann	Canada	37.21	+3.11
19	6	I	Chris Huizinga	Netherlands	37.45	+3.35
20	6	O	Felix Maly	Germany	37.48	+3.38
21	4	I	Davide Ghiotto	Italy	37.52	+3.42
22	5	O	Kars Jansman	Netherlands	37.60	+3.50
23	3	O	Michele Malfatti	Italy	38.07	+3.97
24	5	I	Viktor Hald Thorup	Denmark	38.16	+4.06

=== 5000 m ===
The race was started on 9 March at 15:34.

Rank	Pair	Lane	Name	Country	Time	Diff
1	11	O	Davide Ghiotto	Italy	6:06.28 TR	
2	11	I	Patrick Roest	Netherlands	6:06.55	+0.27
3	10	I	Sander Eitrem	Norway	6:07.49	+1.21
4	10	O	Michele Malfatti	Italy	6:12.60	+6.32
5	12	O	Hallgeir Engebråten	Norway	6:14.21	+7.93
6	7	I	Sverre Lunde Pedersen	Norway	6:14.53	+8.25
7	6	I	Jordan Stolz	United States	6:14.76	+8.48
8	8	O	Bart Swings	Belgium	6:15.44	+9.16
9	12	I	Chris Huizinga	Netherlands	6:16.34	+10.06
10	9	O	Kars Jansman	Netherlands	6:16.40	+10.12
11	9	I	Wu Yu	China	6:16.86	+10.58
12	5	O	Riku Tsuchiya	Japan	6:22.76	+16.48
13	8	I	Ethan Cepuran	United States	6:22.77	+16.49
14	4	O	Viktor Hald Thorup	Denmark	6:23.39	+17.11
15	3	I	Daniele Di Stefano	Italy	6:24.64	+18.36
16	7	O	Shomu Sasaki	Japan	6:25.43	+19.15
17	4	I	Felix Maly	Germany	6:27.54	+21.26
18	1	I	Chung Jae-won	South Korea	6:29.37	+23.09
19	5	I	Gabriel Odor	Austria	6:31.65	+25.37
20	6	O	Jake Weidemann	Canada	6:34.32	+28.04
21	2	I	Indra Médard	Belgium	6:38.84	+32.56
22	1	O	Mateusz Śliwka	Poland	6:46.89	+40.61
23	3	O	Nuraly Akzhol	Kazakhstan	6:53.94	+47.66
24	2	O	Samuli Suomalainen	Finland	7:00.67	+54.39

=== 1500 m ===
The race was started on 10 March at 14:08.

Rank	Pair	Lane	Name	Country	Time	Diff
1	12	I	Jordan Stolz	United States	1:41.77 TR	
2	12	O	Patrick Roest	Netherlands	1:43.37	+1.59
3	10	O	Bart Swings	Belgium	1:43.76	+1.98
4	11	I	Sverre Lunde Pedersen	Norway	1:43.97	+2.19
5	7	I	Daniele Di Stefano	Italy	1:43.99	+2.21
6	11	O	Hallgeir Engebråten	Norway	1:44.09	+2.31
7	7	O	Chung Jae-won	South Korea	1:44.23	+2.45
8	10	I	Sander Eitrem	Norway	1:44.33	+2.55
9	9	I	Shomu Sasaki	Japan	1:44.36	+2.58
10	9	O	Riku Tsuchiya	Japan	1:45.86	+4.08
11	8	I	Davide Ghiotto	Italy	1:45.93	+4.15
12	5	O	Ethan Cepuran	United States	1:45.96	+4.18
12	4	I	Gabriel Odor	Austria	1:45.96	+4.18
14	8	O	Wu Yu	China	1:46.03	+4.25
15	5	I	Michele Malfatti	Italy	1:46.70	+4.92
16	4	O	Felix Maly	Germany	1:46.78	+5.00
17	6	I	Chris Huizinga	Netherlands	1:46.79	+5.01
18	2	O	Mateusz Śliwka	Poland	1:47.85	+6.07
19	3	O	Jake Weidemann	Canada	1:48.02	+6.24
20	3	I	Viktor Hald Thorup	Denmark	1:48.03	+6.25
21	2	I	Indra Médard	Belgium	1:48.10	+6.32
22	1	O	Samuli Suomalainen	Finland	1:48.13	+6.35
23	6	O	Kars Jansman	Netherlands	1:48.17	+6.39
24	1	I	Nuraly Akzhol	Kazakhstan	1:49.03	+7.25

=== 10000 m ===
The race was started on 10 March at 15:54.

Rank	Pair	Lane	Name	Country	Time	Diff
1	1	I	Davide Ghiotto	Italy	12:40.61 TR	
2	4	O	Patrick Roest	Netherlands	12:51.81	+11.20
3	3	O	Hallgeir Engebråten	Norway	12:55.42	+14.81
4	2	O	Sander Eitrem	Norway	12:56.22	+15.61
5	1	O	Michele Malfatti	Italy	13:02.35	+21.74
6	4	I	Jordan Stolz	United States	13:04.76	+24.15
7	2	I	Bart Swings	Belgium	13:06.12	+25.51
8	3	I	Sverre Lunde Pedersen	Norway	13:14.56	+33.95

=== Overall standings ===
After all events.

Rank	Name	Country	500m	5000m	1500m	10000m	Points	Diff
1st place, gold medalist(s)	Jordan Stolz	United States	34.10	6:14.76	1:41.78	13:04.76	144.740 WR	
2nd place, silver medalist(s)	Patrick Roest	Netherlands	36.06	6:06.55	1:43.37	12:51.81	145.762	+20.42
3rd place, bronze medalist(s)	Hallgeir Engebråten	Norway	36.37	6:14.21	1:44.09	12:55.42	147.258	+50.36
4	Sander Eitrem	Norway	37.06	6:07.49	1:44.33	12:56.22	147.396	+53.12
5	Davide Ghiotto	Italy	37.52	6:06.28	1:45.93	12:40.61	147.489	+54.96
6	Bart Swings	Belgium	36.36	6:15.44	1:43.76	13:06.12	147.796	+1:01.12
7	Sverre Lunde Pedersen	Norway	36.24	6:14.53	1:43.97	13:14.56	148.077	+1:06.74
8	Michele Malfatti	Italy	38.07	6:12.60	1:46.70	13:02.35	150.014	+1:45.46
9	Shomu Sasaki	Japan	35.43	6:25.43	1:44.36	—N/a	108.759	
10	Daniele Di Stefano	Italy	36.11	6:24.64	1:43.99	—N/a	109.237	
11	Riku Tsuchiya	Japan	35.83	6:22.76	1:45.86	—N/a	109.392	
12	Chung Jae-won	South Korea	36.10	6:29.37	1:44.23	—N/a	109.780	
13	Wu Yu	China	36.80	6:16.86	1:46.03	—N/a	109.829	
14	Ethan Cepuran	United States	37.07	6:22.77	1:45.96	—N/a	110.667	
15	Chris Huizinga	Netherlands	37.45	6:16.34	1:46.79	—N/a	110.680	
16	Gabriel Odor	Austria	36.44	6:31.65	1:45.96	—N/a	110.925	
17	Kars Jansman	Netherlands	37.60	6:16.40	1:48.17	—N/a	111.296	
18	Felix Maly	Germany	37.48	6:27.54	1:46.78	—N/a	111.827	
19	Viktor Hald Thorup	Denmark	38.16	6:23.39	1:48.03	—N/a	112.509	
20	Jake Weidemann	Canada	37.21	6:34.32	1:48.02	—N/a	112.648	
21	Indra Médard	Belgium	37.21	6:38.84	1:48.10	—N/a	113.127	
22	Mateusz Śliwka	Poland	36.51	6:46.89	1:47.85	—N/a	113.149	
23	Nuraly Akzhol	Kazakhstan	36.57	6:53.94	1:48.13	—N/a	114.190	
24	Samuli Suomalainen	Finland	36.08	7:00.67	1:49.03	—N/a	114.307	
