= List of Indonesian records in speed skating =

The following are the national records in speed skating in Indonesia.

== Men ==
Event	Record	Athlete	Date	Meet	Place	Ref
500 meters						
500 meters × 2						
1000 meters						
1500 meters						
3000 meters						
5000 meters						
10000 meters						
Team pursuit (8 laps)						
Sprint combination						
Small combination						
Big combination						

== Women ==
Event	Record	Athlete	Date	Meet	Place	Ref
500 meters	43.26	Jami Papilaja	16 February 2019	International Race	Inzell, Germany	
500 meters × 2						
1000 meters	1:35.61	Jami Papilaja	4 March 2019	Schaatscircuit.nl	Heerenveen, Netherlands	
1500 meters						
3000 meters						
5000 meters						
10000 meters						
Team pursuit (6 laps)						
Sprint combination						
Mini combination						
Small combination						
