= 2024 World Single Distances Speed Skating Championships – Men's 1000 metres =

Men's 1000 metres at the 2024 World Single Distances Speed Skating Championships
- Venue: Olympic Oval
- Location: Calgary, Canada
- Dates: February 17
- Competitors: 24 from 12 nations
- Winning time: 1:06.05

Medalists
gold medal	Jordan Stolz	United States
silver medal	Ning Zhongyan	China
bronze medal	Kjeld Nuis	Netherlands

The Men's 1000 metres competition at the 2024 World Single Distances Speed Skating Championships was held on February 17, 2024.

== Results ==
The race was started at 14:48.

Rank	Pair	Lane	Name	Country	Time	Diff
1st place, gold medalist(s)	12	o	Jordan Stolz	United States	1:06.05	
2nd place, silver medalist(s)	10	o	Ning Zhongyan	China	1:06.53	+0.48
3rd place, bronze medalist(s)	9	o	Kjeld Nuis	Netherlands	1:06.80	+0.75
4	3	o	Laurent Dubreuil	Canada	1:07.04	+0.99
5	12	i	Tim Prins	Netherlands	1:07.16	+1.11
6	10	i	Tatsuya Shinhama	Japan	1:07.34	+1.29
7	8	i	Damian Żurek	Poland	1:07.44	+1.39
8	6	o	Ryota Kojima	Japan	1:07.47	+1.42
9	11	i	Marten Liiv	Estonia	1:07.53(1)	+1.48
10	7	o	David Bosa	Italy	1:07.53(5)	+1.48
11	7	i	Taiyo Nonomura	Japan	1:07.54	+1.49
12	3	i	Piotr Michalski	Poland	1:07.58	+1.53
13	9	i	Hendrik Dombek	Germany	1:07.63	+1.58
14	11	o	Håvard Holmefjord Lorentzen	Norway	1:07.66	+1.61
15	8	o	Moritz Klein	Germany	1:07.74	+1.69
16	4	i	Jenning de Boo	Netherlands	1:07.89	+1.84
17	5	o	Cooper McLeod	United States	1:08.09	+2.04
18	1	o	Mathias Vosté	Belgium	1:08.11	+2.06
19	6	i	Connor Howe	Canada	1:08.32	+2.27
20	1	i	Cho Sang-hyeok	South Korea	1:08.38	+2.33
21	5	i	Vincent De Haître	Canada	1:08.43	+2.38
22	2	o	Kim Tae-yun	South Korea	1:08.52	+2.47
23	2	i	Bjørn Magnussen	Norway	1:08.61	+2.56
24	4	o	Conor McDermott-Mostowy	United States	1:08.99	+2.94
