= Speed skating at the 2026 Winter Olympics – Men's 1500 metres =

Men's 1500 metres at the XXV Olympic Winter Games
- Speed skating
- Venue: Milano Speed Skating Stadium, Milan
- Date: 19 February 2026
- Competitors: 30 from 17 nations
- Winning time: 1:41.98

Medalists
| 1st place, gold medalist(s) | | Ning Zhongyan | China |
| 2nd place, silver medalist(s) | | Jordan Stolz | United States |
| 3rd place, bronze medalist(s) | | Kjeld Nuis | Netherlands |

The men's 1500 m competition in speed skating at the 2026 Winter Olympics was held on 19 February, at the Milano Speed Skating Stadium in Milan. Ning Zhongyan of China won the event, setting a new Olympic record and winning his third medal at the 2026 Games. This is also his first gold medal, and second gold in men's speed skating and third gold in speed skating overall for China. Jordan Stolz of the United States won silver, also his third medal, and defending champion Kjeld Nuis of the Netherlands won bronze, his fourth medal in the same event.

== Background ==
The 2022 champion, Kjeld Nuis, qualified for the event. The bronze medalist, Kim Min-seok, qualified as well, though he switched from representing South Korea to representing Hungary. The silver medalist, Thomas Krol, retired from competitions. Before the Olympics, Jordan Stolz was leading the 1500m standings of the 2025–26 ISU Speed Skating World Cup. Peder Kongshaug was the 1500m 2025 world champion.

== Records ==
Prior to this competition, the existing world, Olympic and track records were as follows.

| World record | Kjeld Nuis (NED) | 1:40.17 | Salt Lake City, United States | 10 March 2019 |
| Olympic record | Kjeld Nuis (NED) | 1:43.21 | Beijing, China | 16 February 2022 |
| Track record | Taiga Sasaki (JPN) | 1:47.40 | | 30 November 2025 |

A new Olympic record was set during the competition; the previous record was set four years earlier and was broken by 1.23 seconds; the top four finishers were under the previous record.

| Date | Round | Athlete | Country | Time | Record |
|---|---|---|---|---|---|
| 19 February | Pair 13 | Ning Zhongyan | China | 1:41.98 | OR, TR |

== Results ==
| Rank | Pair | Lane | Name | Country | Time | Time behind | Notes |
|---|---|---|---|---|---|---|---|
| 1st place, gold medalist(s) | 13 | I | Ning Zhongyan | China | 1:41.98 | | OR, TR |
| 2nd place, silver medalist(s) | 15 | I | Jordan Stolz | United States | 1:42.75 | +0.77 | |
| 3rd place, bronze medalist(s) | 13 | O | Kjeld Nuis | Netherlands | 1:42.82 | +0.84 | |
| 4 | 11 | O | Joep Wennemars | Netherlands | 1:43.05 | +1.07 | |
| 5 | 15 | O | Peder Kongshaug | Norway | 1:43.93 | +1.43 | |
| 6 | 11 | I | Daniele Di Stefano | Italy | 1:43.41 | +1.95 | |
| 7 | 9 | O | Kim Min-seok | Hungary | 1:45.13 | +3.15 | |
| 8 | 10 | O | Gabriel Odor | Austria | 1:45.18 | +3.20 | |
| 9 | 14 | O | Sander Eitrem | Norway | 1:45.36 | +3.38 | |
| 10 | 6 | O | Vladimir Semirunniy | Poland | 1:45.37 | +3.39 | |
| 11 | 12 | I | Tijmen Snel | Netherlands | 1:45.51 | +3.53 | |
| 12 | 10 | I | Kazuya Yamada | Japan | 1:45.53 | +3.55 | |
| 13 | 14 | I | Finn Sonnekalb | Germany | 1:45.64 | +3.66 | |
| 14 | 1 | I | Chung Jae-won | South Korea | 1:45.80 | +3.82 | |
| 15 | 5 | O | David La Rue | Canada | 1:46.02 | +4.04 | |
| 16 | 7 | I | Metoděj Jílek | Czech Republic | 1:46.08 | +4.10 | |
| 17 | 4 | O | Valentin Thiebault | France | 1:46.12 | +4.14 | |
| 18 | 12 | O | Taiyo Nonomura | Japan | 1:46:18 | +4.20 | |
| 19 | 7 | O | Hendrik Dombek | Germany | 1:46.52 | +4.54 | |
| 20 | 4 | I | Moritz Klein | Germany | 1:46.54 | +4.56 | |
| 21 | 8 | I | Didrik Eng Strand | Norway | 1:46.76 | +4.78 | |
| 22 | 8 | O | Alexander Farthofer | Austria | 1:46.77 | +4.79 | |
| 23 | 3 | O | Daniel Hall | Canada | 1:46.91 | +4.93 | |
| 24 | 1 | O | Mathias Vosté | Belgium | 1:47.19 | +5.21 | |
| 25 | 5 | I | Emery Lehman | United States | 1:47.23 | +5.25 | |
| 26 | 3 | I | Motonaga Arito | Japan | 1:47.45 | +5.47 | |
| 27 | 2 | O | Marten Liiv | Estonia | 1:47.76 | +5.78 | |
| 28 | 2 | I | Livio Wenger | Switzerland | 1:47.80 | +5.82 | |
| 29 | 6 | I | Casey Dawson | United States | 1:47.88 | +5.90 | |
| 30 | 9 | I | Liu Hanbin | China | 1:48.99 | +7.01 | |
