= 2023–24 ISU Speed Skating World Cup =

World speed skating tournament in Asia, Europe and North-America

- Dates: 10 November 2023 – 4 February 2024

The 2023–24 ISU Speed Skating World Cup is an international level speed skating tournament. The season consists of 6 events, and began on 10 November 2023 in Obihiro, Japan and ended on 4 February 2024 in Quebec City, Canada. The World Cup is organised by the ISU who also runs world cups and championships in short track speed skating and figure skating.

== Calendar ==
The calendar for the 2023–24 season.

WC #	Location	Venue	Date	500 m	1000 m	1500 m	3000 m	5000 m	10000 m	Mass start	Team pursuit	Team sprint	Mixed relay
1	Obihiro	Meiji Hokkaido-Tokachi Oval	10–12 Nov	2m, 2w	m, w	m, w	w	m		m, w	m, w		x
2	Beijing	National Speed Skating Oval	17–19 Nov	2m, 2w	m, w	m, w	w	m		m, w		m, w	
3	Stavanger	Sørmarka Arena	1–3 Dec	m, w	m, w	m, w		w	m	m, w		m, w	
4	Tomaszów Mazowiecki	Ice Arena	8–10 Dec	2m, 2w	m, w	m, w	w	m		m, w	m, w		
5	Salt Lake City	Utah Olympic Oval	26–28 Jan	m, w	2m, 2w	m, w	w	m		m, w	m, w		x
6	Quebec City	Centre de Glaces	2–4 Feb	2m, 2w	m, w	m, w	w	m		m, w		m, w	
Total				10m, 10w	7m, 7w	6m, 6w	5w	5m, 1w	1m	6m, 6w	3m, 3w	3m, 3w	2x

== World Cup standings ==
=== Men's 500 metres ===
Pos	Athlete	Points
1	(Japan) Wataru Morishige	483
2	(Canada) Laurent Dubreuil	466
3	(Japan) Yuma Murakami	449
4	(United States) Jordan Stolz	375
5	(South Korea) Kim Jun-ho	366

=== Women's 500 metres ===
Pos	Athlete	Points
1	(United States) Erin Jackson	522
2	(South Korea) Kim Min-Sun	514
3	(Netherlands) Femke Kok	447
4	(United States) Kimi Goetz	382
5	(Netherlands) Marrit Fledderus	362

=== Men's 1000 metres ===
Pos	Athlete	Points
1	(China) Ning Zhongyan	319
2	(United States) Jordan Stolz	316
3	(Japan) Tatsuya Shinhama	257
4	(Netherlands) Tim Prins	256
5	(Norway) Håvard Holmefjord Lorentzen	252

=== Women's 1000 metres ===
Pos	Athlete	Points
1	(Japan) Miho Takagi	348
2	(United States) Kimi Goetz	307
3	(United States) Brittany Bowe	297
4	(Netherlands) Jutta Leerdam	252
5	(Netherlands) Femke Kok	247

=== Men's 1500 metres ===
Pos	Athlete	Points
1	(China) Ning Zhongyan	292
2	(United States) Jordan Stolz	288
3	(Netherlands) Wesly Dijs	224
4	(Norway) Hallgeir Engebråten	202
5	(Canada) Connor Howe	198

=== Women's 1500 metres ===
Pos	Athlete	Points
1	(Japan) Miho Takagi	300
2	(China) Han Mei	271
3	(Netherlands) Joy Beune	239
4	(Netherlands) Marijke Groenewoud	220
5	(United States) Brittany Bowe	207

=== Men's long distances ===
Pos	Athlete	Points
1	(Italy) Davide Ghiotto	324
2	(Canada) Ted-Jan Bloemen	291
3	(Netherlands) Patrick Roest	274
4	(Norway) Hallgeir Engebråten	244
5	(Italy) Michele Malfatti	241

=== Women's long distances ===
Pos	Athlete	Points
1	(Norway) Ragne Wiklund	300
2	(Czech Republic) Martina Sábliková	260
3	(Canada) Valérie Maltais	249
4	(Netherlands) Joy Beune	243
5	(Netherlands) Irene Schouten	232

=== Men's mass start ===
Pos	Athlete	Points
1	(Italy) Andrea Giovannini	274
2	(South Korea) Chung Jae-won	269
3	(Netherlands) Bart Hoolwerf	263
4	(Switzerland) Livio Wenger	254
5	(Belgium) Bart Swings	247

=== Women's mass start ===
Pos	Athlete	Points
1	(Canada) Valérie Maltais	263
2	(Canada) Ivanie Blondin	257
3	(Netherlands) Irene Schouten	248
4	(United States) Mia Manganello	248
5	(Belgium) Sandrine Tas	219

=== Men's team pursuit ===
Pos	Athlete	Points
1	United States	168
2	Norway	162
3	Italy	156
4	Netherlands	126
5	China	124

=== Women's team pursuit ===
Pos	Athlete	Points
1	Japan	174
2	Canada	168
3	Poland	134
4	United States	120
5	China	119

=== Men's team sprint ===
Pos	Athlete	Points
1	United States	246
2	Poland	240
3	China	238
4	Germany	200
5	Norway	197

=== Women's team sprint ===
Pos	Athlete	Points
1	Netherlands	264
2	Poland	237
3	China	222
4	Germany	194
5	United States	184

== Medal count ==
Rank	Nation	Gold	Silver	Bronze	Total
1	Netherlands	22	19	20	61
2	United States	20	10	14	44
3	Japan	19	10	9	38
4	Norway	6	4	5	15
5	Canada	5	11	7	23
6	South Korea	4	5	4	13
7	Italy	3	7	4	14
8	China	2	9	9	20
9	Poland	1	3	6	10
10	Belgium	1	2	2	5
11	Czech Republic	1	1	0	2
12	Switzerland	0	2	2	4
13	Germany	0	1	1	2
14	Kazakhstan	0	0	1	1
Totals (14 entries)		84	84	84	252
