= ISU Speed Skating Awards =

Sports award

- Presented by: International Skating Union
- First award: 2026

ISU Speed Skating Awards is a special annual ceremony event by the International Skating Union (ISU). It awards speed skater with the most outstanding speed skating performance of the season. The first edition held in 2026 in Heerenveen after the World Championships.

== Award winners ==
| Year | Location | Award | Winner | Country |
|---|---|---|---|---|
| 2026 | (Netherlands) Heerenveen | Most Improved Skater | Valérie Maltais | Canada |
| 2026 | (Netherlands) Heerenveen | Best Newcomer | Metoděj Jílek | Czech Republic |
| 2026 | (Netherlands) Heerenveen | Most Season Wins | Man: Jordan Stolz | United States |
| 2026 | (Netherlands) Heerenveen | Most Season Wins | Woman: Femke Kok | Netherlands |
