= 2024 World Single Distances Speed Skating Championships – Men's 500 metres =

Men's 500 metres at the 2024 World Single Distances Speed Skating Championships
- Venue: Olympic Oval
- Location: Calgary, Canada
- Dates: February 16
- Competitors: 24 from 11 nations
- Winning time: 33.69

Medalists
gold medal	Jordan Stolz	United States
silver medal	Laurent Dubreuil	Canada
bronze medal	Damian Żurek	Poland

The Men's 500 metres competition at the 2024 World Single Distances Speed Skating Championships was held on February 16, 2024.

== Results ==
The race was started at 14:21.

Rank	Pair	Lane	Name	Country	Time	Diff
1st place, gold medalist(s)	12	o	Jordan Stolz	United States	33.69	
2nd place, silver medalist(s)	12	i	Laurent Dubreuil	Canada	33.95	+0.26
3rd place, bronze medalist(s)	9	i	Damian Żurek	Poland	34.11	+0.42
4	10	i	Wataru Morishige	Japan	34.26	+0.57
5	9	o	Bjørn Magnussen	Norway	34.28	+0.59
6	5	o	Stefan Westenbroek	Netherlands	34.41	+0.72
7	3	o	Cho Sang-hyeok	South Korea	34.45	+0.76
8	11	o	Kim Jun-ho	South Korea	34.49	+0.80
9	11	i	Yuma Murakami	Japan	34.555	+0.86
10	4	o	Håvard Holmefjord Lorentzen	Norway	34.556	+0.86
11	5	i	Cooper McLeod	United States	34.56	+0.87
12	4	i	Jenning de Boo	Netherlands	34.57	+0.88
13	7	i	David Bosa	Italy	34.58	+0.89
14	6	o	Marten Liiv	Estonia	34.626	+0.93
15	8	i	Janno Botman	Netherlands	34.628	+0.93
16	7	o	Piotr Michalski	Poland	34.63	+0.94
17	2	o	Yankun Zhao	Canada	34.65	+0.96
18	1	o	Du Haonan	China	34.665	+0.97
18	8	o	Marek Kania	Poland	34.665	+0.97
20	3	i	Zach Stoppelmoor	United States	34.70	+1.01
21	10	o	Tatsuya Shinhama	Japan	34.77	+1.08
22	2	i	Deng Zhihan	China	34.80	+1.11
23	6	i	Nil Llop	Spain	34.82	+1.13
24	1	i	Kim Tae-yun	South Korea	34.89	+1.20
