= 2023 World Single Distances Speed Skating Championships – Men's 500 metres =

Men's 500 metres at the 2023 World Single Distances Speed Skating Championships
- Venue: Thialf
- Location: Heerenveen, Netherlands
- Date: 3 March
- Competitors: 24 from 12 nations
- Winning time: 34.10

Medalists
| gold medal | Jordan Stolz | United States |
| silver medal | Laurent Dubreuil | Canada |
| bronze medal | Wataru Morishige | Japan |

The Men's 500 metres competition at the 2023 World Single Distances Speed Skating Championships was held on 3 March 2023.

== Results ==
The race was started at 20:14.

| Rank | Pair | Lane | Name | Country | Time | Diff |
|---|---|---|---|---|---|---|
| 1st place, gold medalist(s) | 12 | o | Jordan Stolz | United States | 34.10 | |
| 2nd place, silver medalist(s) | 11 | i | Laurent Dubreuil | Canada | 34.46 | +0.36 |
| 3rd place, bronze medalist(s) | 11 | o | Wataru Morishige | Japan | 34.48 | +0.38 |
| 4 | 12 | i | Yuma Murakami | Japan | 34.51 | +0.41 |
| 5 | 10 | i | Merijn Scheperkamp | Netherlands | 34.57 | +0.47 |
| 6 | 6 | o | Hein Otterspeer | Netherlands | 34.79 | +0.69 |
| 7 | 7 | o | Dai Dai N'tab | Netherlands | 34.877 | +0.77 |
| 8 | 9 | i | Damian Żurek | Poland | 34.878 | +0.77 |
| 9 | 9 | o | Tatsuya Shinhama | Japan | 34.93 | +0.83 |
| 10 | 4 | i | Håvard Holmefjord Lorentzen | Norway | 34.97 | +0.87 |
| 11 | 4 | o | Piotr Michalski | Poland | 35.00 | +0.90 |
| 12 | 5 | o | Christopher Fiola | Canada | 35.012 | +0.91 |
| 12 | 10 | o | Kim Jun-ho | South Korea | 35.012 | +0.91 |
| 14 | 8 | i | Marek Kania | Poland | 35.05 | +0.95 |
| 15 | 8 | o | Cha Min-kyu | South Korea | 35.07 | +0.97 |
| 16 | 1 | o | Bjørn Magnussen | Norway | 35.090 | +0.99 |
| 17 | 1 | i | Marten Liiv | Estonia | 35.094 | +0.99 |
| 18 | 6 | i | Nil Llop | Spain | 35.11 | +1.01 |
| 19 | 7 | i | David Bosa | Italy | 35.17 | +1.07 |
| 20 | 2 | i | Cooper McLeod | United States | 35.25 | +1.15 |
| 21 | 2 | o | Kim Cheol-min | South Korea | 35.29 | +1.19 |
| 22 | 5 | i | Yevgeniy Koshkin | Kazakhstan | 35.30 | +1.20 |
| 23 | 3 | i | Lian Ziwen | China | 35.31 | +1.21 |
| 24 | 3 | o | Frank Roth | Canada | 35.32 | +1.22 |
