= 2025 World Single Distances Speed Skating Championships – Men's 1000 metres =

Men's 1000 metres at the 2025 World Single Distances Speed Skating Championships
- Venue: Vikingskipet
- Location: Hamar, Norway
- Dates: 15 March
- Competitors: 24 from 12 nations
- Winning time: 1:08.05

Medalists
| gold medal | Joep Wennemars | Netherlands |
| silver medal | Jenning de Boo | Netherlands |
| bronze medal | Jordan Stolz | United States |

The Men's 1000 metres competition at the 2025 World Single Distances Speed Skating Championships took place on 15 March 2025.

== Qualification ==
A total of 24 entry quotas were available for the event, with a maximum of three per country. The entry quotas were assigned to countries following a Special Qualification Ranking List based on rankings and performances of skaters during the 2024–25 ISU Speed Skating World Cup.

== Records ==
Prior to this competition, the existing world and track records were as follows.

| | Time | Athlete | Date |
|---|---|---|---|
| World Record | 1:05.37 | Jordan Stolz (USA) | 26 January 2024 |
| Track Record | 1:08.16 | Thomas Krol (NED) | 3 March 2022 |

== Results ==
The race was started at 14:45.

| Rank | Pair | Lane | Name | Country | Time | Diff |
|---|---|---|---|---|---|---|
| 1st place, gold medalist(s) | 7 | o | Joep Wennemars | Netherlands | 1:08.05; TR | |
| 2nd place, silver medalist(s) | 11 | i | Jenning de Boo | Netherlands | 1:08.21 | +0.16 |
| 3rd place, bronze medalist(s) | 12 | i | Jordan Stolz | United States | 1:08.26 | +0.21 |
| 4 | 10 | i | Cooper McLeod | United States | 1:08.40 | +0.35 |
| 5 | 7 | i | Laurent Dubreuil | Canada | 1:08.65 | +0.60 |
| 6 | 8 | i | Damian Żurek | Poland | 1:08.73 | +0.68 |
| 7 | 10 | o | Kjeld Nuis | Netherlands | 1:08.98 | +0.93 |
| 8 | 1 | i | Piotr Michalski | Poland | 1:09.08 | +1.03 |
| 9 | 12 | o | Marten Liiv | Estonia | 1:09.10(1) | +1.05 |
| 10 | 9 | i | Ryota Kojima | Japan | 1:09.10(2) | +1.05 |
| 11 | 5 | o | Connor Howe | Canada | 1:09.15 | +1.10 |
| 12 | 9 | o | Kim Min-seok | Hungary | 1:09.18 | +1.13 |
| 13 | 3 | i | Marek Kania | Poland | 1:09.35 | +1.30 |
| 14 | 4 | o | Mathias Vosté | Belgium | 1:09.38 | +1.33 |
| 15 | 8 | o | Moritz Klein | Germany | 1:09.40 | +1.35 |
| 16 | 11 | o | Ning Zhongyan | China | 1:09.43 | +1.38 |
| 17 | 2 | i | Hendrik Dombek | Germany | 1:09.53 | +1.48 |
| 18 | 6 | i | Zach Stoppelmoor | United States | 1:09.54 | +1.49 |
| 19 | 3 | o | Bjørn Magnussen | Norway | 1:09.90 | +1.85 |
| 20 | 4 | i | Stefan Emele | Germany | 1:09.94 | +1.89 |
| 21 | 1 | o | David La Rue | Canada | 1:10.00 | +1.95 |
| 22 | 2 | o | Kazuya Yamada | Japan | 1:10.11 | +2.06 |
| 23 | 5 | i | Tatsuya Shinhama | Japan | 1:10.28 | +2.23 |
| 24 | 6 | o | David Bosa | Italy | 1:11.40 | +3.35 |
