= Joep Wennemars =

Dutch speed skater (born 2002)

Personal information
- Born: 3 October 2002 (age 23) Dalfsen, Netherlands

Sport
- Country: Netherlands
- Sport: Speed skating
- Event(s): 500m, 1000m, 1500m
- Club: Team Essent
- Coached by: Jac Orie
Medal record
Men's speed skating
Representing the Netherlands
World Single Distances Championships
Gold medal – first place	2025 Hamar	1000 m
World Junior Championships
Gold medal – first place	2022 Innsbruck	Overall

Joep Wennemars (born 3 October 2002) is a Dutch speed skater who specializes in the sprint distances.

Wennemars is part of Team Essent. He is the son of two-time former World Sprint Champion Erben Wennemars.

== Career ==
Wennemars won the 2022 World Junior Speed Skating Championships at the Eisschnelllaufbahn Innsbruck in Austria. He made his ISU Speed Skating World Cup debut in November 2022 at the Sørmarka Arena in Stavanger, Norway where he finished seventh in the 500 m in Division B, resulting in a promotion to Division A. At the second World Cup event, held at the Thialf in Heerenveen, he finished in second place in Division A behind Ning Zhongyan in a personal record of 1:08.08.

At the 2025 World Single Distances Speed Skating Championships he won the 1000 m.

In February 2026, Wennemars represented the Netherlands at the 2026 Winter Olympics in the 500 metres, 1000 metres and 1500 metres events. His 1000 m race against Lian Ziwen took a dramatic turn when Wennemars was hindered by his opponent as the former was preparing to cross into the inside track. Wennemars was offered a chance to reskate the 1000 m thirty minutes later but was unable to improve his time, finishing in fifth place.

== Personal records ==
Personal records
Speed skating
Event	Result	Date	Location	Notes
500 m	34.32	23 November 2025	Olympic Oval, Calgary	
1000 m	1:06.44	22 November 2025	Olympic Oval, Calgary	
1500 m	1:42.34	15 November 2025	Utah Olympic Oval, Salt Lake City	
3000 m	3:47.72	4 October 2025	Thialf, Heerenveen	
5000 m	6:44.59	2 October 2021	Max Aicher Arena, Inzell	
