= Jordan Stolz =

American speed skater (born 2004)

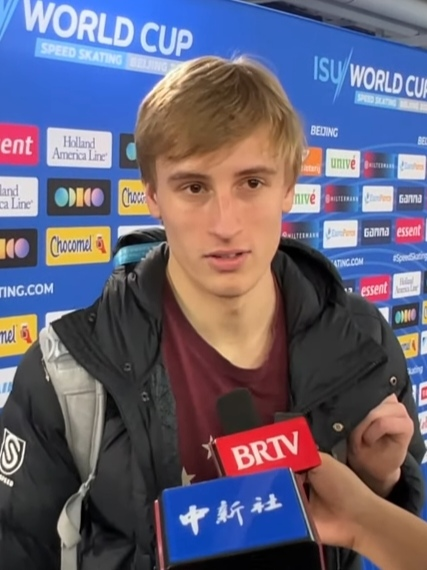
- Stolz in 2024

Personal information
- Born: May 21, 2004 (age 22) Kewaskum, Wisconsin, U.S.
- Height: 6 ft 3/4 in

Sport
- Country: United States
- Sport: Speed skating
- Events: 500m, 1000m, 1500m, Mass Start, Team Sprint, Team Pursuit
Medal record
Men's speed skating
Representing the United States
Event	1st	2nd	3rd
Olympic Games	2	1	0
World Allround Championships	1	0	0
World Single Distances Championships	6	2	1
World Sprint Championships	0	1	0
Four Continents Championships	5	0	0
World Junior Championships	5	0	2
Total	19	4	3
Olympic Games
Gold medal – first place	2026 Milano Cortina	500 m
Gold medal – first place	2026 Milano Cortina	1000 m
Silver medal – second place	2026 Milano Cortina	1500 m
World Allround Championships
Gold medal – first place	2024 Inzell	Allround
World Single Distances Championships
Gold medal – first place	2023 Heerenveen	500 m
Gold medal – first place	2023 Heerenveen	1000 m
Gold medal – first place	2023 Heerenveen	1500 m
Gold medal – first place	2024 Calgary	500 m
Gold medal – first place	2024 Calgary	1000 m
Gold medal – first place	2024 Calgary	1500 m
Silver medal – second place	2025 Hamar	500 m
Silver medal – second place	2025 Hamar	1500 m
Bronze medal – third place	2025 Hamar	1000 m
World Sprint Championships
Silver medal – second place	2026 Heerenveen	Sprint
Four Continents Championships
Gold medal – first place	2024 Salt Lake City	1000 m
Gold medal – first place	2025 Hachinohe	500 m
Gold medal – first place	2025 Hachinohe	1000 m
Gold medal – first place	2025 Hachinohe	1500 m
Gold medal – first place	2025 Hachinohe	Team pursuit
World Junior Championships
Gold medal – first place	2023 Inzell	500 m
Gold medal – first place	2023 Inzell	1000 m
Gold medal – first place	2023 Inzell	1500 m
Gold medal – first place	2023 Inzell	Team sprint
Gold medal – first place	2023 Inzell	Overall
Bronze medal – third place	2023 Inzell	5000 m
Bronze medal – third place	2023 Inzell	Mass start

Jordan Stolz (born May 21, 2004) is an American long track speed skater and Olympic gold medalist. At the 2023 World Single Distances Speed Skating Championships, Stolz won the 500 meters to become the youngest single distance world champion in history. He also became the first male skater to win three individual gold medals at a single World Single Distances Speed Skating Championships, a feat he repeated in 2024.

At the 2024 World Allround Speed Skating Championships, he won the gold medal in his World Allround Speed Skating Championships debut, breaking the world record for the big combination, and became the youngest male World Allround champion in 46 years.

At the 2026 Winter Olympics, Stolz won gold medals in the 500 meters and 1000 meters, setting Olympic records in both events, and won silver in the 1500 meters. This was the second-best medals performance by an American in a single Olympic Winter Games in history, behind only Eric Heiden's five gold medals in 1980.

At the junior level, Stolz also won gold medals in the 500 meters, 1000 meters, and 1500 meters at the 2023 World Junior Speed Skating Championships, becoming the first person to win titles in three separate distances at the Senior and Junior World Championships in the same year.

He currently holds three junior world records (500 meters, 1000 meters, mini combination) and two senior world records (1000 meters, big combination).

== Early life ==
Stolz was born on May 21, 2004, in West Bend, Wisconsin, the son of dental hygienist Jane and police officer Dirk Stolz, originally from Germany. His parents also worked in taxidermy and owned a moose farm as well.

Stolz credited Apolo Anton Ohno's and Shani Davis's successes at the 2010 Winter Olympics in Vancouver as inspiration to initially take up skating at the age of 5. He acknowledged that had he not seen the television coverage of the 2010 Olympic Winter Games, he would not have been in the sport of speed skating. Stolz was motivated to try skating after being excited from seeing the speed skaters travelling fast on the ice. His father Dirk bought skates for both Jordan and his elder daughter, Hannah.

Dirk was very enthusiastic about his children skating and installed outdoor lighting at the family backyard pond so that both Jordan and his sister could skate at all hours. Dirk said that the family would do short track until both Jordan and Hannah "got too fast".

== Career ==
=== 2020–21 season ===
During the 2021 US Long Track Speed Skating Championships at the Utah Olympic Oval in Kearns, Utah, Stolz won his first U.S. senior national title in the 500 meters at just 16 years of age when he skated a time of 34.99 seconds in the first 500 meter race on March 5, 2021. He went under 35.00 seconds in the 500 meters for the first time and broke the national junior record of 35.17 he had set the previous week during time trials at the Oval. The record was broken two days later when Cooper McCleod skated a 34.90 in the second 500 meters. The next day in the first of two men's 1000 meter races he set a second national junior record by skating 1:08.57 to place third. Then on March 7, he skated a 35.07 to finish third in the second 500 merers behind Austin Kleba (34.89) and Cooper McCleod (34.90), and followed that up with a sixth-place finish in the second 1000 meters in a time of 1:09.40. With a Samalog score of 139.045 he finished third in the Men's US Sprint Championship behind Kleba (138.815) and Kimani Griffin (138.840).

=== 2021–22 season: First Olympics ===
At 17 years of age he made his senior international debut during the 2021–22 ISU Speed Skating World Cup in Kearns, Utah, at the Utah Olympic Oval. On December 3, 2021, he finished last of 41 competitors in the first 500 meters division B race. Two days later he won the second 500 meters division B race in 34.31 seconds, breaking his own junior world record. Later that same day he set a second junior world record, this time in the 1000 meters, when he skated a time of 1:07.03 to place third in the division B race. He was promoted to the 500 meters and 1000 meters division A for the next World Cup races.

The following week (December 10–12, 2021) at ISU World Cup Speed Skating #4 in Calgary, Canada, at the Calgary Olympic Oval he once again broke the 500 meters junior world record, as well as the American record, with a time of 34.11 in the first 500 meters Division A race on the first day of competition. His time was good enough for 7th place. The following day he finished third in the mass start semi final 1, earning a spot in the finals, where he finished 15th out of 17 skaters. On the last day of competition, Stolz won his first medal at the senior international level with a second place finish in the 1000 meters. His time of 1:06.96 broke the junior world record he had set the previous week at World Cup #3.

During the Olympic trials at Pettit National Ice Center, he broke track records in the 500 meters and 1000 meters en route to winning both races. Both track records had been held by Shani Davis since 2005. As a result, he was named to the United States' roster to compete in both distances at the 2022 Winter Olympics. He competed in the 500 meters, where he finished in thirteenth place, and the 1000 meters, where he finished in fourteenth place. At 17 years old, he was the third-youngest American male to compete in the Olympics in long track speed skating.

=== 2022–23 season: World Single Distances three gold medals and World Junior champion ===
On November 11, 2022, during the World Cup #1 of the 2022–23 ISU Speed Skating World Cup, Stolz became the youngest man to win an individual World Cup speed skating race. He won the 1500 meters with a time of 1 minute, 44.891 seconds, a track record at Sørmarka Arena. He also won a gold medal in the 1000 meters with a time of 1:08.73. On December 17, 2022, during the World Cup #4 of the 2022–23 ISU Speed Skating World Cup, Stolz won medals in all three events he competed in. He won a gold medal in the 1000 meters, and silver medals in the 500 meters and 1500 meters. He set the junior world and American records in the 500 meters with a time of 34.08 seconds. He finished the season ranked among the top-three in the 1000 and 1500 meters, and in the top-five of the 500 meters.

At the 2023 World Junior Speed Skating Championships, Stolz won four gold medals (500 meters, 1000 meters, 1500 meters and team sprint) and two bronze medals (5000 meters and mass start), and was named the overall World Junior Speed Skating champion.

At the 2023 World Single Distances Speed Skating Championships, Stolz won a gold medal in the 500 meters, 1000 meters and 1500 meters events, becoming the youngest world champion in history. In the 500 meters, he finished with a time of 34.10, while he finished the 1000 meters with a time of 1:07.11, both were the second-fastest time in history for a sea level rink. He became the first male speed skater to win three individual gold medals at a single World Championship. In addition, Stolz broke the record for youngest gold medalist.

=== 2023–24 season: World Allround champion and second World Single Distances three gold medals ===
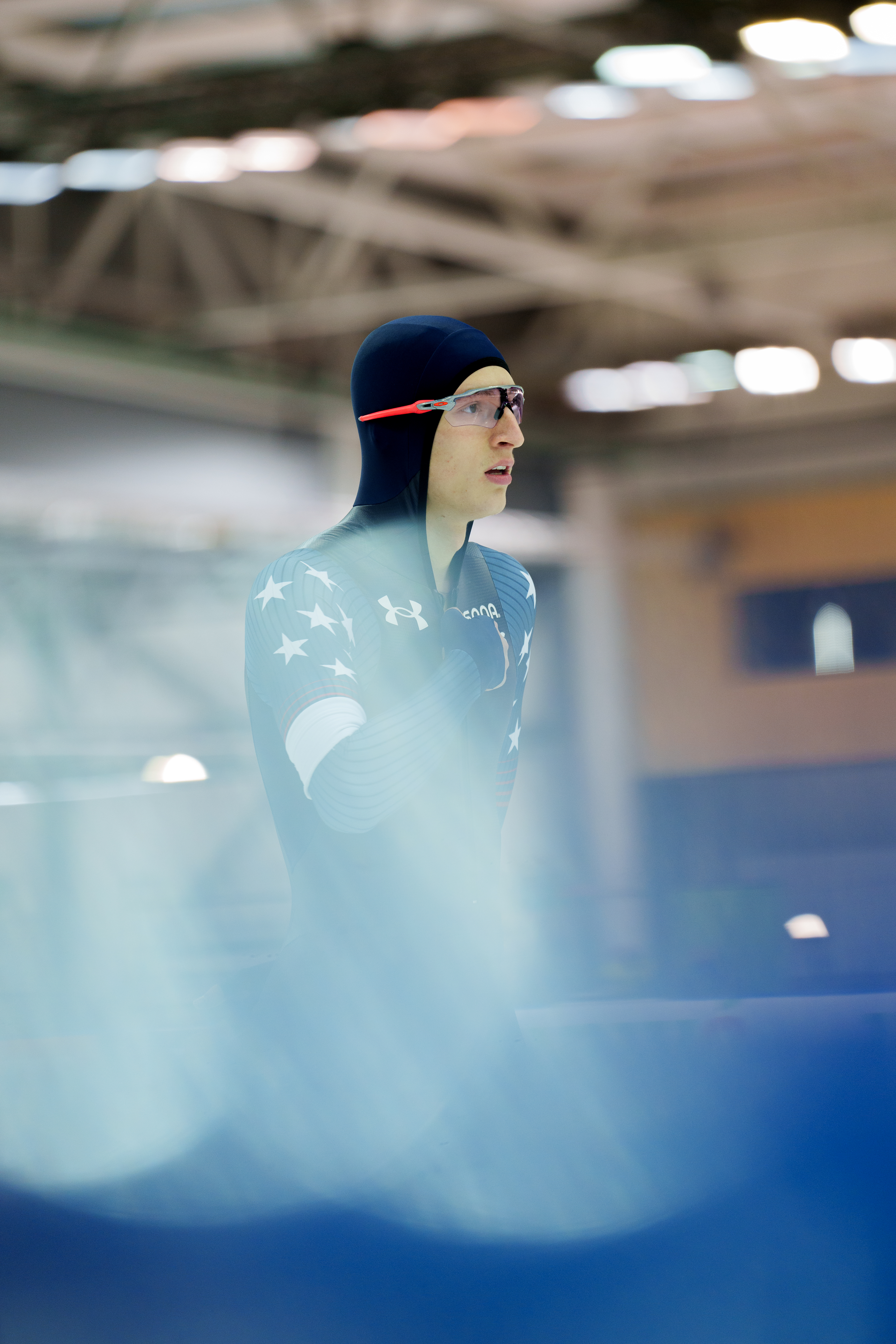
Stolz during the 2023–24 Stavanger World Cup

In the late spring of 2023, Stolz signed a three-year contract with the Dutch commercial team Albert Heijn Zaanlander based in Heerenveen. He did not move to the Netherlands and continued training with his own coach in Milwaukee. With the contract, Stolz stated that he would be paid a salary that he could not receive as a solo American skater. He spent the summer of 2023 training with AH Zaanlander colleagues in the Netherlands and lived with fellow team mate Tjerk de Vries in his family home in the village of Weidum.

At the 2024 Four Continents Speed Skating Championships, he won a gold medal in the 1000 meters with an American record time of 1:06.27, surpassing the previous record of 1:06.42 set by Shani Davis in 2009.

On January 26, 2024, during the World Cup #5 of the 2023–24 ISU Speed Skating World Cup, Stolz set the world record in the 1000 meters with a time of 1:05.37.

During the 2024 World Single Distances Speed Skating Championships at the Olympic Oval in Calgary, Stolz won gold medals in the 500 meters, 1000 meters and 1500 meters events. In the 500 meters, he set a track record and an American record time of 33.69. In the 1000 meters, he set a track record with a time of 1:06.05.

In February 2024 Stolz decided not to participate in the 2024 World Sprint Speed Skating Championships, but instead take part in the 2024 World Allround Speed Skating Championships that took place the following days. He called the allround title a more prestigious one and a bigger challenge. Stolz won a gold medal and broke the world record in big combination with 144.740 points. He became the youngest man to win the World Allround Speed Skating Championships since fellow American Eric Heiden's second of three consecutive titles in 1978. On the first day he finished first in the 500 meters with a Max Aicher Arena track record of 34.10 and in seventh place in the 5000 meters with a time of 6:14.76. On the second day he finished first in the 1500 meters with a track record of 1:41.77, and in sixth place in the 10,000 meters with a time of 13:04.76.

=== 2024–25 season: World Cup series winning streak and champion ===
At the 2025 Four Continents Speed Skating Championships, Stolz won four gold medals in 500 meters, 1000 meters, 1500 meters and team pursuit. He set a track record of 1:08.04 in the 1000 meters and 1:44.45 in the 1500 meters.

During the World Cup #1 of the 2024–25 ISU Speed Skating World Cup, Stolz won four races, including setting two track records, 1000 meters in 1:07.18 and 1500 meters in 1:43.65. One week later, during the World Cup #2, he won four races again and set a track records of 34.27 in the first 500 meters race and 1:07.62 in the 1000 meters.

On January 26, 2025, during the World Cup #3, he set new track records of 1:05.90 in the 1000 meters and 1:41.22 in the 1500 meters. One week later, during the World Cup #4, he set a world record at sea level in the 1000 meters with a time of 1:06.16. On February 1, 2025, he set the record for the longest men's ISU Speed Skating World Cup win streak at 18 consecutive wins, surpassing the previous record held by Sven Kramer. The next day, his record win streak ended finishing 0.05 seconds behind Tatsuya Shinhama.

In early February 2025, Stolz was diagnosed with pneumonia and strep throat. During World Cup #5, he won three races and set track records in the 1000 meters with a time of 1:08.42, and the 1500 meters with a time of 1:45.08. One week later, during World Cup #6, he raced on the first day of the competition and placed second in the first 500 meters race, and fifth place in the 1500 meters. He already had won the 500, 1000 and 1500 meters World Cup trophies before the final weekend and decided to withdraw from his remaining races to rest for the 2025 World Single Distances Speed Skating Championships.

Since recovering from his pneumonia and strep throat in early February, Stolz has not been able to replicate his usual form. On the first day of 2025 World Single Distances Speed Skating Championships, Stolz won a silver medal in the 500 meters with a time of 34.38. The next day, he won a bronze medal in the 1000 meters with a time of 1:08.26. On the final day of the competition, he won a silver medal in the 1500 meters with a time of 1:44.71.

=== 2025–26 season: Two Olympic gold medals and new Olympic records ===
During the 2025–26 ISU Speed Skating World Cup, Stolz won 16 races and 20 medals over five World Cup stops. He won the 500, 1000 and 1500 meters World Cup trophies for the second consecutive season. During World Cup #3 he set three Thialf track records. On the first day he won the 1500 meters with a time of 1:42.55. The next day he won the 1000 meters with a time of 1:06.38. On the final day he won the 500 meters with a time of 33.90. The following week during World Cup #4 he set three Vikingskipet track records. On the first day he won the 500 meters with a time of 33.97. Later that day he won the 1500 meters with a time of 1:44.16. The next day he won the 1000 meters with a time of 1:07.63. On the final day he won the mass start for the first time in his World Cup career.

In January 2026, he was named to the United States' roster to compete at the 2026 Winter Olympics at age 21. He will compete in the 500 meters, 1000 meters, 1500 meters and mass start events. Stolz saved the blades from his 1000 meters world record race in 2024 and will use them during the 2026 Winter Olympics. During his first race of the Olympics on February 11, 2026, he won a gold medal in the 1000 meters with an Olympic record time of 1:06.28. On February 14, he won a second gold medal in the 500 meters with an Olympic record time of 33.77 seconds. Stolz's medal was the first American gold in the event since Joey Cheek in 2006. He joined Eric Heiden as the only men to win gold medals in the 500 and 1000 meters at a single Olympics. On February 19, he won a silver medal in the 1500 meters with a time of 1:42.75. On February 21, he finished in fourth place in the mass start with 10 points. He finished the Olympics with two individual gold medals, and three total medals, making him the most successful American athlete.

He was invited by the Milwaukee Brewers to throw out the ceremonial first pitch prior to their opening day game against the Chicago White Sox on March 26, 2026.

=== 2026–27 season ===
To start his post-Olympic season, Stolz parted ways with his longtime coach Bob Corby, and is now coached by Mark Yanagihara, whom he began working with as a skate blade technician five years ago. Shani Davis also serves as an adviser. During the 2026–27 ISU Speed Skating World Cup, he plans to race the 500 meters, 1000 meters, and 1500 meters, but dropped the mass start. On November 21, 2026, during the World Cup #2 in Obihiro, Japan, he set a Meiji Hokkaido-Tokachi Oval track record in the 500 meters with a time of 34.26 seconds, and won his first gold medal of the season. The next day he again won the 500 meters with a time of 34.37 seconds. He also finished in second place in 1500 metres, finishing 21 hundredths behind Ning Zhongyan. In the 1000 meters, his 14-race World Cup win streak was snapped.

== Personal life ==
Stolz eats pizza every day before training. His favorite restaurants are Jimmy John's, Texas Roadhouse and The Fox & Hounds (in Hubertus, Wisconsin). Stolz's hobbies outside of skating include hunting, fishing, and long camping trips to the remote Alaskan wilderness; the family travels to Alaska during the summer to fish halibut and salmon and hunt moose.

Stolz is a Christian. About his political stance, he was quoted in 2024 by Dutch Helden magazine: "My faith is so strong that I do not care who the president of America is. God will lead us. In Europe, they always want to know if I'm in favour of or opposing Trump or Biden. I find it a very European way of thinking: black and white and immediately needing to have an opinion. For us Americans, there's besides the political story also the dignity of the office of the president. It's hard to explain [in Europe]. The White House is an important symbol for us. I would find it an incredible honour to be invited as an Olympic champion to go to the White House. It touches Americans deeply."

== Personal records ==
Personal records
Speed skating
Event	Result	Date	Location	Notes
500-meter	33.69	February 16, 2024	Calgary	National record
1000 meter	1:05.37	January 26, 2024	Salt Lake City	World record
1500 meter	1:40.48	November 15, 2025	Salt Lake City	National record
3000 meter	3:41.17	December 27, 2025	Milwaukee	
5000 meter	6:14.76	March 9, 2024	Inzell	
10000 meter	13:04.76	March 10, 2024	Inzell	
Big combination	144.740 pts	March 9–10, 2024	Inzell	World record

He is currently ranked first in the adelskalender with 143.897 points.

== World Cup overview ==
Overall trophy

Season	500 meter	Points	1000 meter	Points	1500 meter	Points
2022–2023	—N/a			217		236
2023–2024	—N/a			316		288
2024–2025		568		300		340
2025–2026		499		300		300

Key

Category
Senior level
Junior level

Season	Location	500 meter	
2019–2020	(Norway) Bjugn	32th	
2019–2020	(Netherlands) Enschede	29th	
2019–2020	(Belarus) Minsk	15th	
2021–2022	(Canada) Calgary	7th	
2022–2023	(Germany) Inzell	1st place, gold medalist(s)	
2022–2023	(Netherlands) Heerenveen	4th	
2022–2023	(Canada) Calgary	7th	
2022–2023	(Canada) Calgary	2nd place, silver medalist(s)	
2022–2023	(Poland) Tomaszów Mazowiecki	2nd place, silver medalist(s)	
2023–2024	(Japan) Obihiro	6th	3rd place, bronze medalist(s)
2023–2024	(Poland) Tomaszów Mazowiecki	4th	6th
2023–2024	(United States) Salt Lake City	1st place, gold medalist(s)	
2023–2024	(Canada) Quebec	1st place, gold medalist(s)	1st place, gold medalist(s)
2024–2025	(Japan) Nagano	1st place, gold medalist(s)	1st place, gold medalist(s)
2024–2025	(China) Beijing	1st place, gold medalist(s)	1st place, gold medalist(s)
2024–2025	(Canada) Calgary	1st place, gold medalist(s)	
2024–2025	(United States) Milwaukee	1st place, gold medalist(s)	2nd place, silver medalist(s)
2024–2025	(Poland) Tomaszów Mazowiecki	1st place, gold medalist(s)	5th
2024–2025	(Netherlands) Heerenveen	2nd place, silver medalist(s)	
2025–2026	(United States) Salt Lake City	1st place, gold medalist(s)	4th
2025–2026	(Canada) Calgary	3rd place, bronze medalist(s)	1st place, gold medalist(s)
2025–2026	(Netherlands) Heerenveen	1st place, gold medalist(s)	
2025–2026	(Norway) Hamar	1st place, gold medalist(s)	1st place, gold medalist(s)
2025–2026	(Germany) Inzell	2nd place, silver medalist(s)	2nd place, silver medalist(s)
2026–2027	(Japan) Obihiro	1st place, gold medalist(s)	1st place, gold medalist(s)

Season	Location	1000 meter	
2019–2020	(Norway) Bjugn	30th	
2019–2020	(Netherlands) Enschede	24th	
2019–2020	(Belarus) Minsk	20th	
2021–2022	(Canada) Calgary	2nd place, silver medalist(s)	
2022–2023	(Germany) Inzell	1st place, gold medalist(s)	
2022–2023	(Norway) Stavanger	1st place, gold medalist(s)	
2022–2023	(Netherlands) Heerenveen	DQ	
2022–2023	(Canada) Calgary	4th	
2022–2023	(Canada) Calgary	1st place, gold medalist(s)	
2022–2023	(Poland) Tomaszów Mazowiecki	2nd place, silver medalist(s)	
2023–2024	(Japan) Obihiro	3rd place, bronze medalist(s)	
2023–2024	(Poland) Tomaszów Mazowiecki	1st place, gold medalist(s)	
2023–2024	(United States) Salt Lake City	1st place, gold medalist(s)	1st place, gold medalist(s)
2023–2024	(Canada) Quebec	1st place, gold medalist(s)	
2024–2025	(Japan) Nagano	1st place, gold medalist(s)	
2024–2025	(China) Beijing	1st place, gold medalist(s)	
2024–2025	(Canada) Calgary	1st place, gold medalist(s)	
2024–2025	(United States) Milwaukee	1st place, gold medalist(s)	
2024–2025	(Poland) Tomaszów Mazowiecki	1st place, gold medalist(s)	
2025–2026	(United States) Salt Lake City	1st place, gold medalist(s)	
2025–2026	(Canada) Calgary	1st place, gold medalist(s)	
2025–2026	(Netherlands) Heerenveen	1st place, gold medalist(s)	
2025–2026	(Norway) Hamar	1st place, gold medalist(s)	
2025–2026	(Germany) Inzell	1st place, gold medalist(s)	
2026–2027	(Japan) Obihiro	3rd place, bronze medalist(s)	

Season	Location	1500 meter
2019–2020	(Norway) Bjugn	35th
2019–2020	(Netherlands) Enschede	29th
2022–2023	(Norway) Stavanger	1st place, gold medalist(s)
2022–2023	(Netherlands) Heerenveen	9th
2022–2023	(Canada) Calgary	11th
2022–2023	(Canada) Calgary	2nd place, silver medalist(s)
2022–2023	(Poland) Tomaszów Mazowiecki	1st place, gold medalist(s)
2023–2024	(Japan) Obihiro	2nd place, silver medalist(s)
2023–2024	(Norway) Stavanger	1st place, gold medalist(s)
2023–2024	(Poland) Tomaszów Mazowiecki	2nd place, silver medalist(s)
2023–2024	(United States) Salt Lake City	1st place, gold medalist(s)
2023–2024	(Canada) Quebec	1st place, gold medalist(s)
2024–2025	(Japan) Nagano	1st place, gold medalist(s)
2024–2025	(China) Beijing	1st place, gold medalist(s)
2024–2025	(Canada) Calgary	1st place, gold medalist(s)
2024–2025	(United States) Milwaukee	1st place, gold medalist(s)
2024–2025	(Poland) Tomaszów Mazowiecki	1st place, gold medalist(s)
2024–2025	(Netherlands) Heerenveen	5th
2025–2026	(United States) Salt Lake City	1st place, gold medalist(s)
2025–2026	(Canada) Calgary	1st place, gold medalist(s)
2025–2026	(Netherlands) Heerenveen	1st place, gold medalist(s)
2025–2026	(Norway) Hamar	1st place, gold medalist(s)
2025–2026	(Germany) Inzell	1st place, gold medalist(s)
2026–2027	(Japan) Obihiro	2nd place, silver medalist(s)

Season	Location	3000 meter
2019–2020	(Netherlands) Enschede	24th
2022–2023	(Germany) Inzell	2nd place, silver medalist(s)

Season	Location	5000 meter
2023–2024	(Japan) Obihiro	14th
2023–2024	(United States) Salt Lake City	15th

Season	Location	Mass Start
2019–2020	(Norway) Bjugn	11th
2019–2020	(Netherlands) Enschede	16th
2019–2020	(Belarus) Minsk	4th
2021–2022	(Canada) Calgary	15th
2022–2023	(Germany) Inzell	1st place, gold medalist(s)
2025–2026	(United States) Salt Lake City	15th
2025–2026	(Canada) Calgary	3rd place, bronze medalist(s)
2025–2026	(Netherlands) Heerenveen	23rd
2025–2026	(Norway) Hamar	1st place, gold medalist(s)

Season	Location	Team Sprint
2022–2023	(Germany) Inzell	1st place, gold medalist(s)
2022–2023	(Netherlands) Heerenveen	3rd place, bronze medalist(s)

Season	Location	Team Pursuit
2019–2020	(Belarus) Minsk	6th

== Awards ==
- Oscar Mathisen Award: 2023, 2024
- Eric Heiden Athlete of the Year: 2023, 2024
- ISU Speed Skating Awards - Most Season Wins (Man): 2026
