= 2024 World Allround Speed Skating Championships =

- Location: Inzell, Germany
- Venue: Max Aicher Arena
- Dates: 9–10 March

Medalist men
1st place, gold medalist(s)		Jordan Stolz	United States
2nd place, silver medalist(s)		Patrick Roest	Netherlands
3rd place, bronze medalist(s)		Hallgeir Engebråten	Norway

Medalist women
1st place, gold medalist(s)		Joy Beune	Netherlands
2nd place, silver medalist(s)		Marijke Groenewoud	Netherlands
3rd place, bronze medalist(s)		Antoinette Rijpma-de Jong	Netherlands

The 2024 World Allround Speed Skating Championships were held at the Max Aicher Arena in Inzell, Germany, on 9 and 10 March 2024.

== Schedule ==
All times are local (UTC+1).

Date	Time	Event
9 March	12:45	Women's 500 m
9 March	12:45	Men's 500 m
9 March	14:00	Women's 3000 m
9 March	15:20	Men's 5000 m
10 March	13:15	Women's 1500 m
10 March	13:15	Men's 1500 m
10 March	15:00	Women's 5000 m
10 March	15:50	Men's 10,000 m

== Medal summary ==
=== Medal table ===
* Host nation (Germany)

Rank	Nation	Gold	Silver	Bronze	Total
1	Netherlands	1	2	1	4
2	United States	1	0	0	1
3	Norway	0	0	1	1
Totals (3 entries)		2	2	2	6

=== Medalists ===
Event	Gold		Silver		Bronze	
Men	Jordan Stolz; United States	144.740 WR	Patrick Roest; Netherlands	145.761	Hallgeir Engebråten; Norway	147.258
Women	Joy Beune; Netherlands	157.268	Marijke Groenewoud; Netherlands	157.720	Antoinette Rijpma-de Jong; Netherlands	158.219
