= Max Aicher Arena =

Stadium in Inzell, Germany

Coordinates: 47.752439°N 12.752364°E

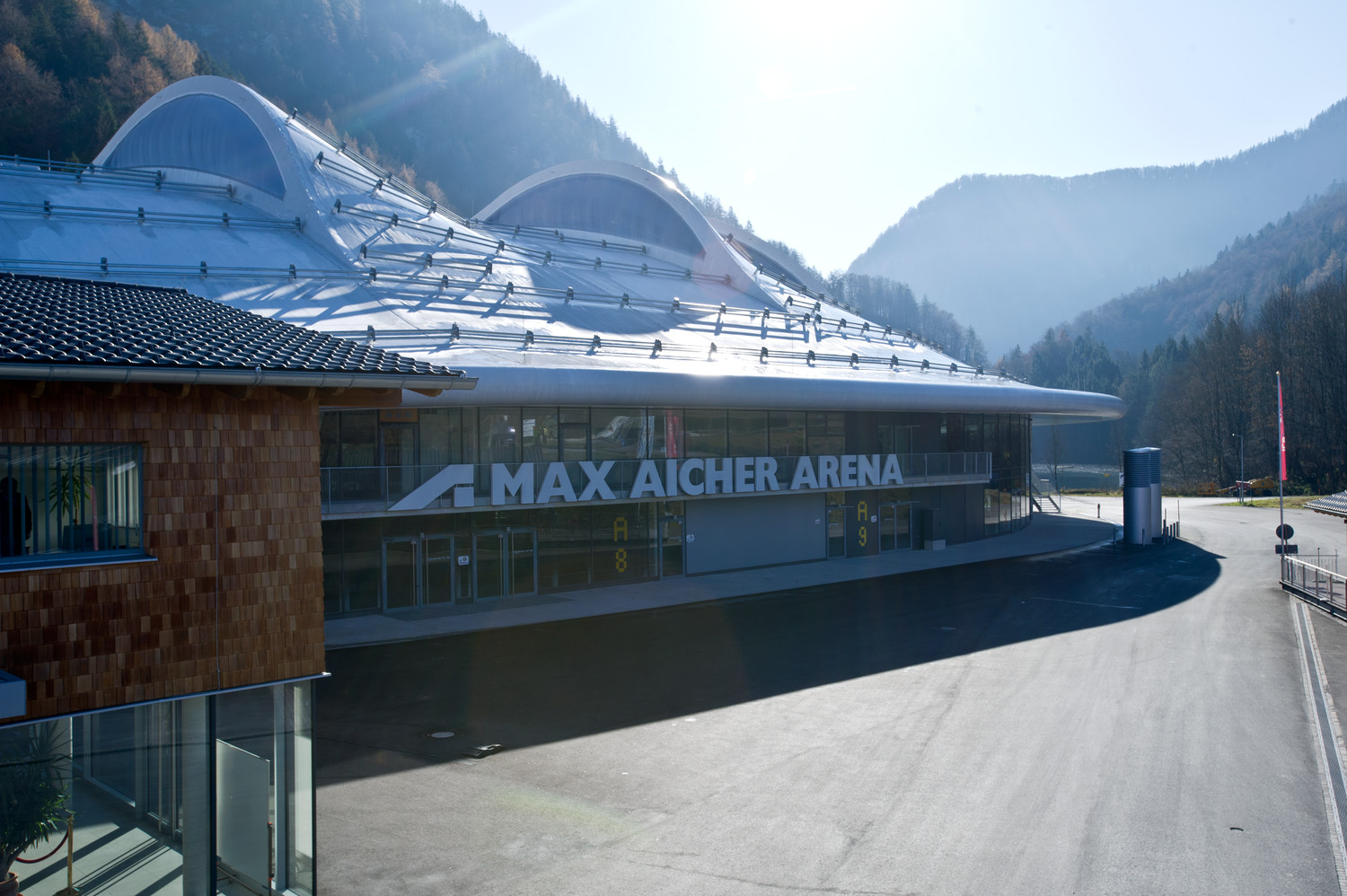
- Interactive map of Max Aicher Arena
- Former names: Ludwig-Schwabl-Stadion
- Location: Inzell, Germany
- Capacity: 10.000

Construction
- Opened: 1965
- Renovated: 2010

The Max Aicher Arena (in the past known as Eisstadion Inzell and Ludwig-Schwabl-Stadion) is a stadium located in Inzell, Germany, best known as a speed skating venue. It is an indoor, artificial ice rink, located 690 metres (2,264 feet) above sea level and has a capacity of 10,000 people. Since its opening, as an outdoor venue, towards the end of 1965, more than 80 world records in speed skating have been broken here, and until the advent of indoor speed skating arenas, it was known as the fastest European speed skating rink, second in the world after the Medeu rink.

The stadium is also used for ice hockey, ice speedway, and (in the summer months) roller skating.

== History ==
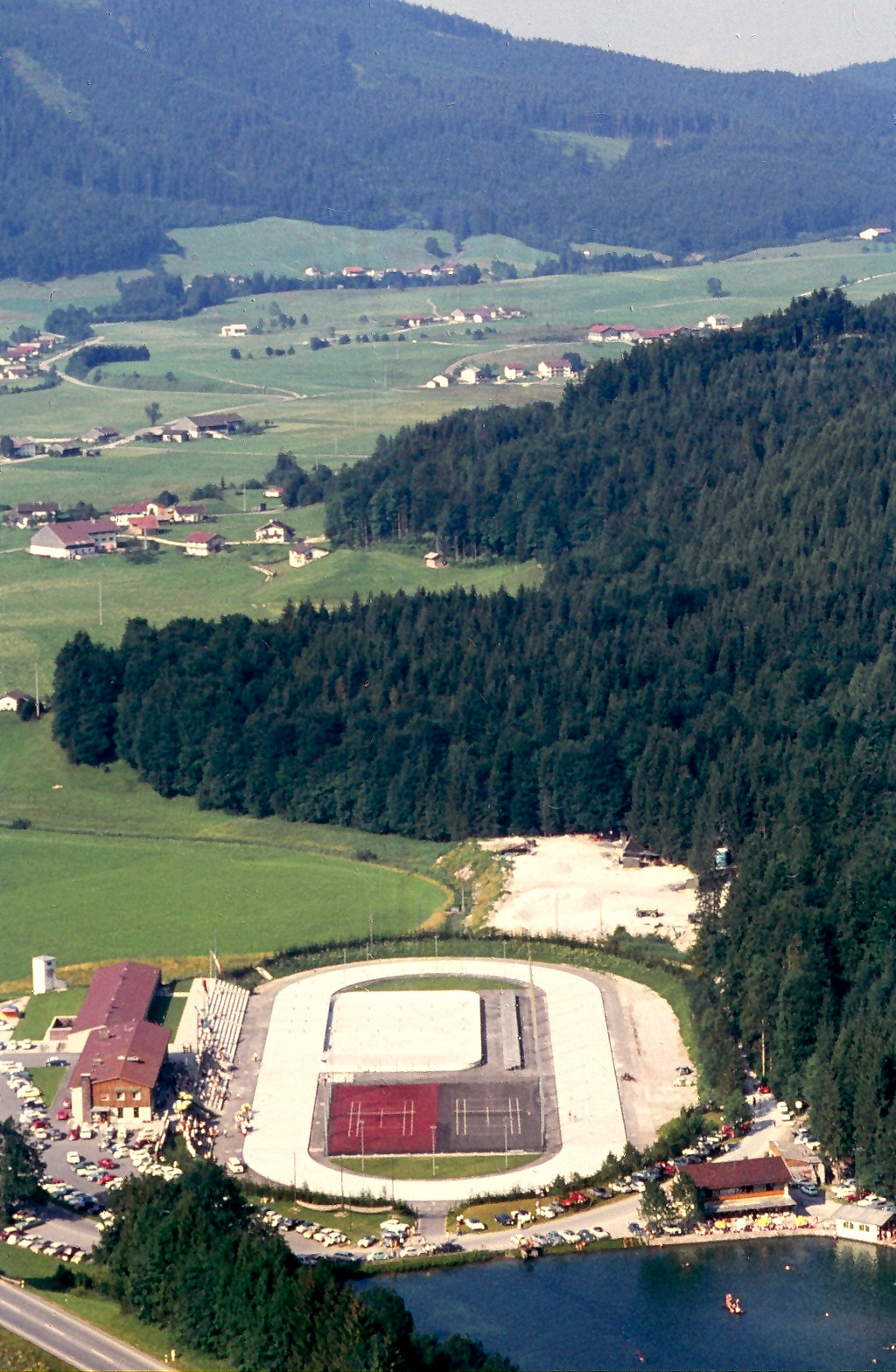
Venue in the 1960s

About five kilometers north of Inzell is the Frillensee, one of the coldest lakes in Germany. Natural ice was prepared for speed skating and ice hockey and became a main training and competitions facility from 1959. The harsh winter conditions finally put an end to the Frillensee as a skating facility with the last German Championships held on 26–27 January 1963. In 1963 a natural ice stadium was built down the valley at Zwingsee and was converted into an artificial ice stadium in 1965. In 1965 the 400 m artificial ice rink was built at the foot of the Falkenstein.

== Competitions ==
- 2011 Ice Racing World Championship Final 4
- 2011 World Single Distance Speed Skating Championships
- 2019 World Single Distance Speed Skating Championships
- 2024 World Sprint Speed Skating Championships
- 2024 World Allround Speed Skating Championships
- 2025-26 ISU Speed Skating World Cup - World Cup 5

== Track records ==
Men
Distance	Time	Skater	Date	Duration
500 m	34.06	(Poland) Damian Żurek	25 January 2026	257 days
1000 m	1:06.83	(United States) Jordan Stolz	24 January 2026	258 days
1500 m	1:41.77	(United States) Jordan Stolz	10 March 2024	943 days
3000 m	3:37.45	(Netherlands) Sven Kramer	7 October 2017	3289 days
5000 m	5:58.52	(Norway) Sander Eitrem	24 January 2026	258 days
10000 m	12:30.44	(Italy) Davide Ghiotto	18 October 2025	356 days
Team pursuit	3:38.43	Netherlands	8 February 2019	2800 days

Women
Distance	Time	Skater	Date	Duration
500 m	36.87	(Netherlands) Femke Kok	23 January 2026	259 days
1000 m	1:12.74	(Netherlands) Jutta Leerdam	24 January 2026	258 days
1500 m	1:52.65	(Netherlands) Joy Beune	10 March 2024	943 days
3000 m	3:54.74	(Norway) Ragne Wiklund	24 January 2026	258 days
5000 m	6:44.85	(Czech Republic) Martina Sáblíková	9 February 2019	2799 days
Team pursuit	2:55.78	Japan	8 February 2019	2800 days
