= Wataru Morishige =

Japanese speed skater (born 2000)

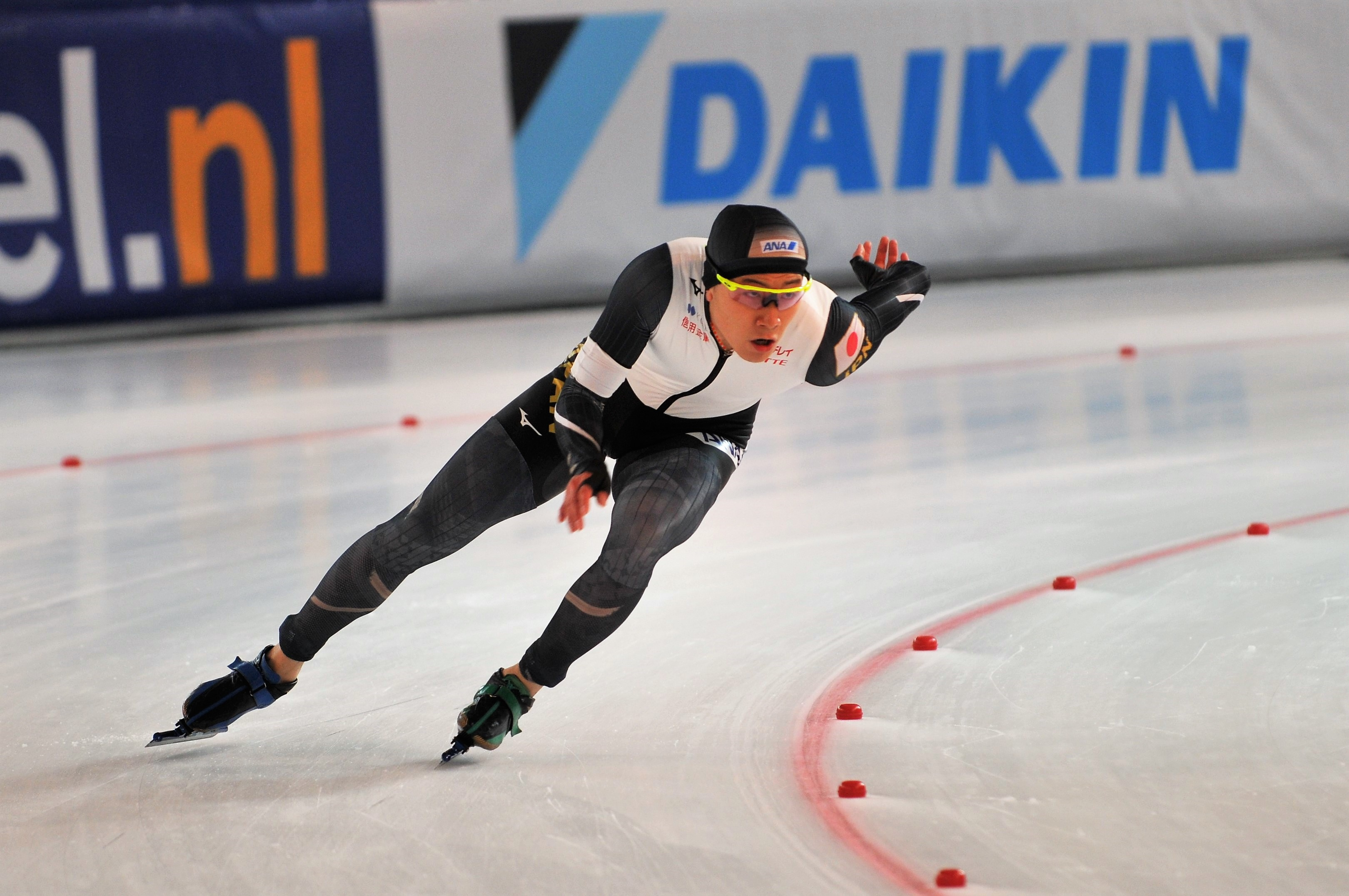
- Morishige in 2022

Personal information
- Born: July 17, 2000 (age 26) Betsukai, Hokkaido, Japan
- Height: 1.73 m (5 ft 8 in)

Sport
- Country: Japan
- Sport: Speed skating
- Event: 500 m
Medal record
Men's speed skating
Representing Japan
Olympic Games
Bronze medal – third place	2022 Beijing	500 m
World Single Distance Championships
Bronze medal – third place	2023 Heerenveen	500 m
Four Continents Championships
Silver medal – second place	2024 Salt Lake City	500 m
Asian Winter Games
Silver medal – second place	2025 Harbin	500 m
Bronze medal – third place	2025 Harbin	Team sprint
World University Games
Gold medal – first place	2023 Lake Placid	500 m

Wataru Morishige (Japanese: 森重航, born 17 July 2000) is a Japanese speed skater who represented Japan at the 2022 Winter Olympics and the 2026 Winter Olympics.

== Career ==
Morishige competed at the 2022 Winter Olympics in the 500 metres and won a bronze medal with a time of 34.50 seconds.

At the 2026 Winter Olympics, Morishige finished 10th in the Men's 500 metres, and 24th in the 1,000 metres.

== Personal records ==
Personal records
Speed skating
Event	Result	Date	Location	Notes
500 m	33.94	15 November 2025	Salt Lake City	
1000 m	1:08.09	14 November 2025	Utah Olympic Oval	Salt Lake City
1500 m	1:50.90	2 March 2024	Hachinohe	
3000 m	4:04.33	4 November 2019	Obihiro	
