= Conor McDermott-Mostowy =

American speed skater (born 1999)

Personal information
- Born: January 13, 1999 (age 27) Virginia, United States
- Education: Macalester College
- Height: 6 ft 1 in (185 cm)

Sport
- Country: United States
- Sport: Speed skating
Medal record
Men's Speed skating
Representing the United States
Four Continents Championships
Bronze medal – third place	2023 Quebec	Team sprint

Conor McDermott-Mostowy (born January 13, 1999) is an American speed skater. He represented the United States at the 2026 Winter Olympics.

== Early life and education ==
McDermott-Mostowy grew up in Washington, D.C. and attended Georgetown Day School, graduating in 2017. He then attended Macalester College in Saint Paul, Minnesota, graduating in 2024 with a major in neuroscience.

== Career ==
McDermott-Mostowy began short-track speed skating at ten years old, before transitioning to long track speed skating at 17 years old.

He was forced to miss the 2022 Winter Olympics after a norovirus illness he sustained derailed his chances of competing. In December 2022, he competed at the 2023 Four Continents Speed Skating Championships and won a bronze medal in team sprint, with a time of 1:21.28.

During World Cup #5 event of the 2024–25 ISU Speed Skating World Cup on February 23, 2025, he earned his first career World Cup win in the team sprint, along with Cooper McLeod and Zach Stoppelmoor. He competed at the 2025 US Championships and won a silver medal in 1500 meter with a personal best time of 1:44.69, finishing behind gold medalist Jordan Stolz.

During the 2026 U.S. Olympic Trials he won the 1000 meters and qualified to represent the United States at the 2026 Winter Olympics.

== Personal life ==
McDermott-Mostowy came out as gay in 2021.
