= Daniele Di Stefano =

Italian speed skater (born 1999)

Personal information
- Nationality: Italian
- Born: 12 February 1999 (age 27) Ladispoli, Italy

Sport
- Sport: Speed skating
Medal record
Representing Italy
Men's speed skating
Universiade
Silver medal – second place	2023 Lake Placid	5000 m
Silver medal – second place	2023 Lake Placid	Mass start
Men's inline skating
World Championships
Bronze medal – third place	2021 Ibagué	3000 m team relay
European Championships
Gold medal – first place	2021 Canales	3000 m team relay
Gold medal – first place	2018 Ostend	3000 m team relay

Daniele Di Stefano (born 12 February 1999) is an Italian speed skater and inline speed skater. Inline, he is part of the Italian team that won the relay race at the 2018 and 2021 European Championships and a bronze medal at the 2021 World Championships. On ice, Di Stefano won silver medals at the Winter World University Games in 2023 and represented Italy at the ISU Speed Skating World Cups from 2022 to 2026. He represents Italy at the 2026 Winter Olympics.

== Career ==
=== Inline skating ===
Di Stefano participated in the 2018 European Inline Skating Speed Championships in Ostend, Belgium, winning the gold medal with the Italian team at the 3000 metre relay race. The Italian team, with Di Stefano, repeated the title at the 2021 European Inline Speed Skating Championships in Canelas, Portugal. At the 2021 World Championships in Ibagué, Colombia, Di Stefano won the bronze medal with the Italian relay team.

=== Speed skating ===
Di Stefano made his international debut on ice at the 2022-23 ISU World Cup 1 in Stavanger with a 4th place at the team pursuit. He won two silver medals at the 2023 Winter World University Games in Lake Placid. Di Stefano holds the Italian record at the 1500 metres and represents Italy at the 2026 Winter Olympics.
