= List of Austrian records in speed skating =

The following are the national records in speed skating in Austria maintained by the Österreichischer Eisschnelllauf Verband (Austrian Speedskating Association, ASSA).

== Men ==
Event	Record	Athlete	Date	Meet	Place	Ref
500 meters	35.20	Ignaz Gschwentner	15 November 2025	World Cup	Salt Lake City, United States	
500 meters × 2	73.23	Roland Brunner	13 March 1999	World Single Distance Championships	Heerenveen, Netherlands	
1000 meters	1:07.92	Gabriel Odor	14 November 2025	World Cup	Salt Lake City, United States	
1500 meters	1:42.97	Alexander Farthofer	22 November 2025	World Cup	Calgary, Canada	
3000 meters	3:37.21	Alexander Farthofer	7 November 2025	Beehive Burn	Salt Lake City, United States	
5000 meters	6:04.21	Alexander Farthofer	14 November 2025	World Cup	Salt Lake City, United States	
10000 meters	13:13.55	Alexander Farthofer	6 December 2025	World Cup	Heerenveen, Netherlands	
Team sprint (3 laps)	1:24.55	Gabriel Odor; Ignaz Gschwentner; Alexander Farthofer	20 November 2022	World Cup	Heerenveen, Netherlands	
Team pursuit (8 laps)	3:49.94	Armin Hager; Linus Heidegger; Bram Smallenbroek	5 December 2014	World Cup	Berlin, Germany	
Sprint combination	142.265 pts	Armin Hager	13–14 March 2014	Olympic Oval Final	Calgary, Canada	
Small combination	152.807 pts	Christian Pichler	March 2008	Olympic Oval Final	Calgary, Canada	
Big combination	156.715 pts	Marnix ten Kortenaar	15–16 January 2000	European Championships	Hamar, Norway	

== Women ==
Event	Record	Athlete	Date	Meet	Place	Ref
500 meters	36.83	Vanessa Herzog	10 March 2019	World Cup	Salt Lake City, United States	
500 meters × 2	75.01	Vanessa Herzog	27 December 2020	Dutch Qualification Tournament	Heerenveen, Netherlands	
1000 meters	1:13.43	Vanessa Herzog	10 December 2017	World Cup	Salt Lake City, United States	
1500 meters	1:53.60	Jeannine Rosner	22 November 2025	World Cup	Calgary, Canada	
3000 meters	3:58.42	Jeannine Rosner	21 November 2025	World Cup	Calgary, Canada	
5000 meters	7:06.63	Jeannine Rosner	5 December 2025	World Cup	Heerenveen, Netherlands	
10000 meters						
Team sprint (3 laps)	1:34.18	Jeannine Rosner; Sarah Rosner; Katharina Mezgolits	9 February 2025	World Junior Championships	Collabo, Italy	
Team pursuit (6 laps)	3:28.30	Kateryna Demydenko; Lisa Zimmerling; Anna Berczelly	1 March 2026	World Junior Championships	Inzell, Germany	
Sprint combination	150.195 pts	Vanessa Herzog	7–8 March 2024	World Sprint Championships	Inzell, Germany	
Mini combination	164.658 pts	Emese Hunyady	25–27 March 1994	Olympic Oval Final	Calgary, Canada	
Small combination	164.885 pts	Emese Hunyady	6–7 February 1999	World Allround Championships	Hamar, Norway	

== Mixed ==
Event	Record	Athlete	Date	Meet	Place	Ref
Relay	2:57.19	Alexander Farthofer; Jeannine Rosner	23 November 2025	World Cup	Calgary, Canada	
