= List of Portuguese records in speed skating =

The following are the unofficial national records in speed skating in Portugal. Portugal is not a member of the ISU.

== Men ==
Event	Record	Athlete	Date	Meet	Place	Ref
500 meters	37.41	Martim Vieira	22 November 2025		Inzell, Germany	
500 meters × 2						
1000 meters	1:11.74	Afonso Silva	17 January 2026	AmCup	Salt Lake City, United States	
1500 meters	1:47.29	Afonso Silva	23 January 2026	World Cup	Inzell, Germany	
3000 meters	3:54.16	Diogo Marreiros	9 October 2021	International Season Opening	Inzell, Germany	
5000 meters	6:30.22	Afonso Silva	24 January 2026	World Cup	Inzell, Germany	
10000 meters	13:41.26	Miguel Bravo	6 December 2025	World Cup	Heerenveen, Netherlands	
Team sprint (3 laps)	1:30.94	Afonso Silva; Miguel Monteiro; Martim Vieira	9 February 2025	World Junior Championships	Collabo, Italy	
Team pursuit (8 laps)	4:14.56	João Jesus; Afonso Silva; Miguel Monteiro	25 November 2023	Junior World Cup	Baselga di Piné, Italy	
Sprint combination						
Small combination						
Big combination						

== Women ==
Event	Record	Athlete	Date	Meet	Place	Ref
500 meters	39.98	Jéssica Rodrigues	27 February 2026	World Junior Championships	Inzell, Germany	
500 meters × 2						
1000 meters	1:18.82	Jéssica Rodrigues	21 November 2025	World Cup	Calgary, Canada	
1500 meters	2:03.53	Jéssica Rodrigues	16 January 2026	AmCup	Salt Lake City, United States	
3000 meters	4:21.88	Jéssica Rodrigues	28 February 2026	World Junior Championships	Inzell, Germany	
5000 meters						
10000 meters						
Team sprint (3 laps)	1:36.05	Jéssica Rodrigues; Francisca Henriques; Lara Nortier	21 February 2026	Junior World Cup	Inzell, Germany	
Team pursuit (6 laps)	3:32.46	Lara Nortier; Clara Pereira; Francisca Henriques	29 November 2025	Junior World Cup	Milan, Italy	
Sprint combination						
Mini combination						
Small combination						

== Mixed ==
Event	Record	Athlete	Date	Meet	Place	Ref
Relay	3:11.44	Francisca Henriques; Martim Vieira	1 March 2026	World Junior Championships	Inzell, Germany	
