= List of French records in speed skating =

The following are the national records in speed skating in France maintained by the Fédération Française des Sports de Glace (FFSG).

== Men ==
Event	Record	Athlete	Date	Meet	Placehiebault	Ref
500 meters	35.45	Arthur Lebeaupin	21 November 2026	World Cup	Obihiro, Japan	
500 meters × 2						
1000 meters	1:08.13	Benjamin Macé	27 January 2013	World Sprint Championships	Salt Lake City, United States	
1500 meters	1:43.25	Valentin Thiebault	22 November 2025	World Cup	Calgary, Canada	
3000 meters	3:40.11	Alexis Contin	25 September 2010	Time Trials	Calgary, Canada	
5000 meters	6:00.23	Timothy Loubineaud	14 November 2025	World Cup	Salt Lake City, United States	
10000 meters	12:36.61	Timothy Loubineaud	6 December 2025	World Cup	Heerenveen, Netherlands	
Team pursuit (8 laps)	3:37.97	Timothy Loubineaud; Valentin Thiebault; Germain Deschamps	16 November 2025	World Cup	Salt Lake City, United States	
Sprint combination	139.665 pts	Benjamin Macé	26–27 January 2013	World Sprint Championships	Salt Lake City, United States	
Small combination	151.418 pts	Pascal Briand	18–19 March 2009	Olympic Oval Final	Calgary, Canada	
Big combination	148.738 pts	Alexis Contin	7–8 March 2015	World Allround Championships	Calgary, Canada	

== Women ==
Event	Record	Athlete	Date	Meet	Place	Ref
500 meters	38.87	Mathilde Pédronno	23 November 2025	World Cup	Calgary, Canada	
500 meters × 2						
1000 meters	1:18.59	Mathilde Pédronno	21 November 2025	World Cup	Calgary, Canada	
1500 meters	1:57.04	Violette Braun	15 November 2025	World Cup	Salt Lake City, United States	
3000 meters	3:59.79	Violette Braun	21 November 2025	World Cup	Calgary, Canada	
5000 meters	6:57.06	Violette Braun	5 December 2025	World Cup	Heerenveen, Netherlands	
10000 meters						
Team pursuit (6 laps)						
Sprint combination	174.500 pts	Marie-France van Helden	22–23 February 1986	World Sprint Championships	Karuizawa, Japan	
Mini combination	179.186 pts	Marie-France van Helden	8–9 December 1984		Inzell, West Germany	
Small combination	186.577 pts	Marie-France van Helden	11–12 January 1986	European Championships	Geithus, Norway	
