= List of Hungarian records in speed skating =

The following are the national records in speed skating in Hungary maintained by the Hungarian National Skating Federation (Hungarian: Magyar Országos Korcsolyázó Szövetség).

== Men ==
Key to tables: Awaiting ratification Record not kept by Hungarian National Skating Federation Not ratified or later rescinded by Hungarian National Skating Federation

Event	Record	Athlete	Date	Meet	Place	Ref
500 meters	35.30	Kim Min-seok	26 January 2025	World Cup	Calgary, Canada	
500 meters × 2	72.93	Zsolt Baló	11–12 February 2002	Olympic Games	Salt Lake City, United States	
1000 meters	1:07.64	Kim Min-seok	25 January 2025	World Cup	Calgary, Canada	
1500 meters	1:42.63	Kim Min-seok	24 January 2025	World Cup	Calgary, Canada	
3000 meters	3:47.25	Konrád Nagy	17 September 2016	Time Trials	Calgary, Canada	
5000 meters	6:32.62	Kim Min-seok	11 January 2025	European Championships	Heerenveen, Netherlands	
10000 meters	14:05.75	Kim Min-seok	12 January 2025	European Championships	Heerenveen, Netherlands	
Team sprint (3 laps)	1:24.82	Lukács Soma; Botond Bejczi; Bálint Bödei	23 February 2025	World Cup	Tomaszów Mazowiecki, Poland	
Team sprint (3 laps)	1:22.41	Botond Bejczi; Bálint Bödei; Konrád Nagy	7 December 2025	World Cup	Heerenveen, Netherlands	
Team sprint (3 laps)	1:21.41	Botond Bejczi; Bálint Bödei; Konrád Nagy	25 January 2026	World Cup	Inzell, Germany	
Team pursuit (8 laps)	3:50.59	Konrád Nagy; Bálint Bödei; Botond Bejczi	16 November 2025	World Cup	Salt Lake City, United States	
Team pursuit (8 laps)	3:48.32	Botond Bejczi; Bálint Bödei; Konrád Nagy	23 November 2025	World Cup	Calgary, Canada	
Sprint combination	144.190 pts	Bálint Bödei	20–21 December 2024	Hungarian Sprint Championships	Inzell, Germany	
Sprint combination	143.845 pts	Zsolt Baló	1–2 December 2001	World Cup	Salt Lake City, United States	
Small combination	156.669 pts	Bálint Bödei	25–26 February 2023	Hungarian Allround Championships	Inzell, Germany	
Big combination	152.382 pts	Kim Min-seok	11–12 January 2025	European Championships	Heerenveen, Netherlands	

== Women ==
Event	Record	Athlete	Date	Meet	Place	Ref
500 meters	39.10	Hanna Bíró	16 November 2025	World Cup	Salt Lake City, United States	
500 meters	38.99	Hanna Bíró	23 November 2025	World Cup	Calgary, Canada	
500 meters × 2						
1000 meters	1:17.11	Krisztina Egyed	17 February 2002	Olympic Games	Salt Lake City, United States	
1000 meters	1:17.09	Krisztina Egyed	11 January 2003	World Cup	Salt Lake City, United States	
1500 meters	1:59.86	Krisztina Egyed	20 February 2002	Olympic Games	Salt Lake City, United States	
3000 meters	4:21.04	Abigél Mercs	4 December 2021	Junior World Cup	Inzell, Germany	
3000 meters	4:19.67	Abigél Mercs	21 November 2025	World Cup	Calgary, Canada	
5000 meters	7:34.73	Abigél Mercs	5 January 2024	Winter World Cup Qualifier	Salt Lake City, United States	
10000 meters						
Team sprint (3 laps)	1:39.99	Ilka Füzesy; Abigél Mercs; Rebeka Vancsó	30 January 2022	World Junior Championships	Innsbruck, Austria	
Team sprint (3 laps)	1:33.63	Hanna Bíró; Kata Iványi; Abigél Mercs	21 February 2026	Junior World Cup	Inzell, Germany	
Team pursuit (6 laps)						
Sprint combination	157.875 pts	Krisztina Egyed	18–19 January 2003	World Sprint Championships	Calgary, Canada	
Sprint combination	156.910 pts	Krisztina Egyed	11–12 January 2003	World Cup	Salt Lake City, United States	
Mini combination	171.261 pts	Krisztina Egyed	8–10 March 1996	World Junior Championships	Calgary, Canada	
Mini combination	166.461 pts	Krisztina Egyed	15–17 November 2002	World Cup	Erfurt, Germany	
Small combination	171.469 pts	Krisztina Egyed	3–5 January 2003	European Championships	Heerenveen, Netherlands	

== Mixed ==
Event	Record	Athlete	Date	Meet	Place	Ref
Relay	3:03.01	Bálint Bödei; Abigél Mercs	28 January 2024	World Cup	Salt Lake City, United States	
Relay	2:55.43	Bálint Bödei; Abigél Mercs	23 November 2025	World Cup	Calgary, Canada	
