= World Junior Speed Skating Championships =

- Status: active
- Genre: sports event
- Date: January–February
- Frequency: annual
- Location: various
- Inaugurated: 1972
- Organiser: ISU

In 1971, the ISU congress decided to hold a World Junior Speed Skating Championships. After two test-championships (1972 and 1973), where only a boys' competition was held in the 1972 edition, the first official championship was introduced in Cortina d'Ampezzo. In this championship boys and girls could enter. Since this championship the World Junior Speed Skating Championships are held every year.

The distances the boys have to skate in a championship were the 500m, 1500m, 3000m, and the 5000m. In 2015 the 1000 metres replaced the 3000m as part of the allround competition. Girls have the 500m, 1000m, 1500m and the 3000m on the programme. In 2002 the team pursuit was added to the allround competition and the 2009 edition saw the introduction of medals for the individual distances. In 2015 the team sprint and mass start events were added. The 2021 edition was cancelled due to the COVID-19 pandemic.

== Summary ==
World Junior Speed Skating Championships
Number	Year	City	Country	Events
-	1972	Lisleby	Norway	1
-	1973	Assen	Netherlands	2
1	1974	Cortina d'Ampezzo	Italy	2
2	1975	Strömsund	Sweden	2
3	1976	Madonna di Campiglio	Italy	2
4	1977	Inzell	Germany	2
5	1978	Montreal	Canada	2
6	1979	Grenoble	France	2
7	1980	Assen	Netherlands	2
8	1981	Elverum	Norway	2
9	1982	Innsbruck	Austria	2
10	1983	Sarajevo	Yugoslavia	2
11	1984	Assen	Netherlands	2
12	1985	Røros	Norway	2
13	1986	Sainte-Foy	Canada	2
14	1987	Strömsund	Sweden	2
15	1988	Seoul	South Korea	2
16	1989	Kyiv	Soviet Union	2
17	1990	Obihiro	Japan	2
18	1991	Calgary	Canada	2
19	1992	Warsaw	Poland	2
20	1993	Baselga di Pinè	Italy	2
21	1994	Berlin	Germany	2
22	1995	Seinäjoki	Finland	2
23	1996	Calgary	Canada	2
24	1997	Butte	United States	2
25	1998	Roseville	United States	2
26	1999	Geithus	Norway	2
27	2000	Seinäjoki	Finland	2
28	2001	Groningen	Netherlands	2
29	2002	Collalbo	Italy	4
30	2003	Kushiro	Japan	4
31	2004	Roseville	United States	4
32	2005	Seinäjoki	Finland	4
33	2006	Erfurt	Germany	4
34	2007	Innsbruck	Austria	4
35	2008	Changchun	China	4
36	2009	Zakopane	Poland	12
37	2010	Moscow	Russia	12
38	2011	Seinäjoki	Finland	12
39	2012	Obihiro	Japan	12
40	2013	Collalbo	Italy	12
41	2014	Bjugn	Norway	12
42	2015	Warsaw	Poland	16
43	2016	Changchun	China	16
44	2017	Helsinki	Finland	16
45	2018	Salt Lake City	United States	16
46	2019	Baselga di Piné	Italy	16
47	2020	Tomaszów Mazowiecki	Poland	16
	2021	~~Hachinohe~~	~~Japan~~	0
48	2022	Innsbruck	Austria	16
49	2023	Inzell	Germany	16
50	2024	Hachinohe	Japan	16
51	2025	Collalbo	Italy	17
52	2026	Inzell	Germany	17

== List of medallists (boys) ==
Year	Location	Gold	Silver	Bronze
1972	Lisleby	(Soviet Union) Yuri Kondakov	(Soviet Union) Nikolay Kuzmenko	(Norway) Terje Andersen
1973	Assen	(Netherlands) Jan Heida	(Soviet Union) Nikolaj Kuzmenko	(Norway) Kay Stenshjemmet
1974	Cortina d'Ampezzo	(East Germany) Manfred Winter	(Netherlands) Jan de Vries	(Poland) Jan Miętus
1975	Strömsund	(Japan) Masayuki Kawahara	(Netherlands) Jan de Vries	(Netherlands) Joop Pasman
1976	Madonna di Campiglio	(South Korea) Lee Young-ha	(United States) Eric Heiden	(Netherlands) Jan de Vries
1977	Inzell	(United States) Eric Heiden	(Sweden) Jan Junell	(Netherlands) Hilbert van der Duim
1978	Montreal	(United States) Eric Heiden	(Soviet Union) Vitaliy Zazerskiy	(Norway) Tom Erik Oxholm
1979	Grenoble	(Sweden) Tomas Gustafson	(East Germany) Andreas Ehrig	(United States) Craig Kressler
1980	Assen	(Sweden) Tomas Gustafson	(United States) Craig Kressler	(Soviet Union) Sergej Berezin
1981	Elverum	(Norway) Bjørn Nyland	(Canada) Jean Pichette	(East Germany) Jörg Mademann
1982	Innsbruck	(Norway) Geir Karlstad	(Soviet Union) Igor Zhelezovski	(Canada) Jean Pichette
1983	Sarajevo	(Soviet Union) Andrej Bobrov	(Soviet Union) Viatsjeslav Vidov	(West Germany) Hansjörg Baltes
1984	Assen	(Soviet Union) Valeri Guk	(Soviet Union) Alexandr Klimov	(Soviet Union) Bronislav Snetkov
1985	Røros	(Soviet Union) Valeri Guk	(Soviet Union) Ildar Garaev	(Soviet Union) Bronislav Snetkov
1986	Sainte-Foy	(Soviet Union) Bronislav Snetkov	(Soviet Union) Ildar Garaev	(Japan) Takuya Nakamura
1987	Strömsund	(Japan) Masahiko Omura	(Japan) Naoki Kotake	(East Germany) Michael Spielmann
1988	Seoul	(East Germany) Michael Spielmann	(Netherlands) Cor-Jan Smulders	(Japan) Naoki Kotake
1989	Kiev	(Soviet Union) Andrej Anufrienko	(Netherlands) Rintje Ritsma	(Japan) Naoki Kotake
1990	Obihiro	(Netherlands) Falko Zandstra	(Norway) Ådne Søndrål	(Netherlands) Arjan Schreuder
1991	Calgary	(Netherlands) Falko Zandstra	(Soviet Union) Sergey Baryshev	(Japan) Keiji Shirahata
1992	Warsaw	(Netherlands) Jeroen Straathof	(Japan) Hiroyuki Noake	(Netherlands) Jakko Jan Leeuwangh
1993	Baselga di Pinè	(United States) Brian Smith	(Netherlands) Ids Postma	(Japan) Keiji Shirahata
1994	Berlin	(Netherlands) Jan Bos	(Netherlands) Marco Kramer	(Japan) Shinya Tanaka
1995	Seinäjoki	(Netherlands) Bob de Jong	(Canada) Mark Knoll	(Japan) Yusuke Imai
1996	Calgary	(Netherlands) Bob de Jong	(Canada) Mark Knoll	(Japan) Mitsuru Watanabe
1997	Butte	(Netherlands) Jelmer Beulenkamp	(Netherlands) André Vreugdenhil	(Netherlands) Gijs Buitelaar
1998	Roseville	(Russia) Dmitry Shepel	(Netherlands) Mark Tuitert	(Netherlands) Bjarne Rykkje
1999	Geithus	(Netherlands) Mark Tuitert	(Netherlands) Yuri Solinger	(South Korea) Choi Jae-bong
2000	Seinäjoki	(Sweden) Johan Röjler	(Japan) Takaharu Nakajima	(Germany) Jan Friesinger
2001	Groningen	(Japan) Shingo Doi	(South Korea) Mun Jun	(South Korea) Yeo Sang-yeop
2002	Collalbo	(Netherlands) Beorn Nijenhuis	(Russia) Ivan Skobrev	(Netherlands) Remco olde Heuvel
2003	Kushiro	(Netherlands) Remco olde Heuvel	(Germany) Robert Lehmann	(South Korea) Lee Seung-hwan
2004	Roseville	(Canada) Justin Warsylewicz	(Netherlands) Sven Kramer	(South Korea) Yeo Sang-yeop
2005	Seinäjoki	(Netherlands) Sven Kramer	(Netherlands) Wouter olde Heuvel	(Norway) Håvard Bøkko
2006	Erfurt	(Norway) Håvard Bøkko	(Netherlands) Wouter olde Heuvel	(Japan) Shingo Hashibami
2007	Innsbruck	(Netherlands) Sjoerd de Vries	(Netherlands) Tim Roelofsen	(United States) Trevor Marsicano
2008	Changchun	(Netherlands) Jan Blokhuijsen	(Netherlands) Koen Verweij	(Netherlands) Berden de Vries
2009	Zakopane	(Netherlands) Koen Verweij	(United States) Jonathan Kuck	(United States) Brian Hansen
2010	Moscow	(Netherlands) Koen Verweij	(United States) Brian Hansen	(Canada) Antoine Gélinas-Beaulieu
2011	Seinäjoki	(Norway) Sverre Lunde Pedersen	(Norway) Simen Spieler Nilsen	(Norway) Kristian Reistad Fredriksen
2012	Obihiro	(Norway) Sverre Lunde Pedersen	(Netherlands) Thomas Krol	(Norway) Simen Spieler Nilsen
2013	Collalbo	(South Korea) Seo Jeong-su	(Norway) Simen Spieler Nilsen	(Italy) Andrea Giovannini
2014	Bjugn	(Netherlands) Patrick Roest	(Netherlands) Willem Hoolwerf	(United States) Emery Lehman
2015	Warsaw	(Netherlands) Patrick Roest	(South Korea) Kim Min-seok	(Netherlands) Marcel Bosker
2016	Changchun	(Canada) Benjamin Donnelly	(South Korea) Kim Min-seok	(Netherlands) Marcel Bosker
2017	Helsinki	(Netherlands) Chris Huizinga	(Norway) Allan Dahl Johansson	(Canada) Tyson Langelaar
2018	Salt Lake City	(Norway) Allan Dahl Johansson	(Canada) Tyson Langelaar	(Italy) Francesco Betti
2019	Baselga di Piné	(South Korea) Chung Jae-won	(Russia) Stepan Chistiakov	(Italy) Francesco Betti
2020	Tomaszów Mazowiecki	(Russia) Stepan Chistiakov	(South Korea) Chung Jae-won	(Russia) Pavel Taran
2021	Cancelled due to the COVID-19 pandemic			
2022	Innsbruck	(Netherlands) Joep Wennemars	(Netherlands) Tim Prins	(Norway) Emil Pedersen Matre
2023	Inzell	(United States) Jordan Stolz	(South Korea) Yang Ho-jun	(Netherlands) Tim Prins
2024	Hachinohe	(Norway) Didrik Eng Strand	(Germany) Finn Sonnekalb	(Norway) Finn Elias Haneberg
2025	Collalbo	(Germany) Finn Sonnekalb	(Czech Republic) Metoděj Jílek	(Norway) Didrik Eng Strand
2026	Inzell	(Germany) Finn Sonnekalb	(Netherlands) Thijs Wiersma	(Norway) Eirik Andersen

== List of medallists (girls) ==
Year	Location	Gold	Silver	Bronze
1973	Assen	(Canada) Sylvia Burka	(Netherlands) Froukje Jongsma	(United States) Kay Lunda
1974	Cortina d'Ampezzo	(Poland) Erwina Ryś-Ferens	(Soviet Union) Tatyana Fradina	(Soviet Union) Tatyana Timoshina
1975	Strömsund	(East Germany) Heike Lange	(Poland) Erwina Ryś-Ferens	(Netherlands) Pietje Postma
1976	Madonna di Campiglio	(Canada) Liz Appleby	(United States) Beth Heiden	(East Germany) Katrin Lorenz
1977	Inzell	(United States) Kim Kostron	(United States) Beth Heiden	(Norway) Bjørg Eva Jensen
1978	Montreal	(United States) Beth Heiden	(Norway) Bjørg Eva Jensen	(East Germany) Ines Bautzmann
1979	Grenoble	(United States) Beth Heiden	(Norway) Bjørg Eva Jensen	(Netherlands) Ria Visser
1980	Assen	(Norway) Bjørg Eva Jensen	(United States) Sarah Docter	(Netherlands) Ria Visser
1981	Elverum	(United States) Sarah Docter	(East Germany) Elke Wirsing	(Netherlands) Yvonne van Gennip
1982	Innsbruck	(East Germany) Angela Stahnke	(Netherlands) Yvonne van Gennip	(Japan) Seiko Hashimoto
1983	Sarajevo	(East Germany) Angela Stahnke	(Japan) Seiko Hashimoto	(East Germany) Sjouke Hoffmann
1984	Assen	(East Germany) Angela Stahnke	(Soviet Union) Galina Voilochnikova	(North Korea) Song Hwa-son
1985	Røros	(East Germany) Cornelia Dick	(Soviet Union) Ljudmila Tuberozova	(East Germany) Monique Garbrecht
1986	Sainte-Foy	(East Germany) Monique Garbrecht	(East Germany) Anja Ulbricht	(Soviet Union) Ljudmila Tuberozova
1987	Strömsund	(East Germany) Monique Garbrecht	(East Germany) Anja Ulbricht	(East Germany) Silke Luding
1988	Seoul	(Japan) Emi Tanaka	(East Germany) Claudia Pechstein	(Japan) Shiho Kusunose
1989	Kiev	(East Germany) Ulrike Adeberg	(East Germany) Anke Baier	(Netherlands) Sandra Zwolle
1990	Obihiro	(East Germany) Ulrike Adeberg	(East Germany) Anke Baier	(Japan) Takako Tetsuda
1991	Calgary	(East Germany) Anke Baier	(Soviet Union) Svetlana Bazhanova	(Germany) Sabine Völker
1992	Warsaw	(Japan) Nami Nemoto	(Germany) Sabine Völker	(Commonwealth of Independent States) Tatyana Trapeznikova
1993	Baselga di Pinè	(Germany) Franziska Schenk	(Japan) Mie Shimizu	(Japan) Maki Tabata
1994	Berlin	(Japan) Mie Shimizu	(Germany) Anni Friesinger	(Netherlands) Marianne Timmer
1995	Seinäjoki	(United States) Becky Sundstrom	(Germany) Anni Friesinger	(United States) Chris Scheels
1996	Calgary	(Germany) Anni Friesinger	(Netherlands) Renate Groenewold	(Japan) Aki Tonoike
1997	Butte	(United States) Kirstin Holum	(South Korea) Baek Eun-bi	(Japan) Kanae Kobayashi
1998	Roseville	(Japan) Aki Tonoike	(United States) Catherine Raney	(Netherlands) Frijke Schaafsma
1999	Geithus	(Netherlands) Helen van Goozen	(Japan) Yuri Obara	(Japan) Keiko Taguchi
2000	Seinäjoki	(Netherlands) Frédérique Ankoné	(Netherlands) Wieteke Cramer	(Germany) Heike Hartmann
2001	Groningen	(Netherlands) Frédérique Ankoné	(Germany) Heike Hartmann	(Netherlands) Elma de Vries
2002	Collalbo	(Netherlands) Elma de Vries	(Japan) Eriko Ishino	(Germany) Judith Hesse
2003	Kushiro	(Canada) Shannon Rempel	(Japan) Eriko Ishino	(United States) Maria Lamb
2004	Roseville	(Japan) Eriko Ishino	(Netherlands) Ireen Wüst	(Canada) Shannon Rempel
2005	Seinäjoki	(Netherlands) Ireen Wüst	(Netherlands) Annette Gerritsen	(South Korea) Lee Sang-hwa
2006	Erfurt	(South Korea) Kim Yoo-rim	(Czech Republic) Martina Sáblíková	(South Korea) Lee Ju-yeon
2007	Innsbruck	(South Korea) Noh Seon-yeong	(Netherlands) Laurine van Riessen	(China) Fu Chunyan
2008	Changchun	(Netherlands) Marrit Leenstra	(Canada) Justine L'Heureux	(Netherlands) Jorieke van der Geest
2009	Zakopane	(Netherlands) Roxanne van Hemert	(Netherlands) Yvonne Nauta	(Poland) Katarzyna Woźniak
2010	Moscow	(Netherlands) Lotte van Beek	(Norway) Hege Bøkko	(Czech Republic) Karolína Erbanová
2011	Seinäjoki	(Czech Republic) Karolína Erbanová	(Netherlands) Pien Keulstra	(Netherlands) Lotte van Beek
2012	Obihiro	(Japan) Miho Takagi	(Czech Republic) Karolína Erbanová	(South Korea) Kim Bo-reum
2013	Collalbo	(Japan) Miho Takagi	(Netherlands) Antoinette de Jong	(Switzerland) Kaitlyn McGregor
2014	Bjugn	(Netherlands) Antoinette de Jong	(Netherlands) Melissa Wijfje	(Russia) Elizaveta Kazelina
2015	Warsaw	(Netherlands) Melissa Wijfje	(Netherlands) Sanneke de Neeling	(Russia) Elizaveta Kazelina
2016	Changchun	(Russia) Elizaveta Kazelina	(China) Mei Han	(South Korea) Park Ji-woo
2017	Helsinki	(Netherlands) Jutta Leerdam	(Netherlands) Joy Beune	(Netherlands) Sanne in 't Hof
2018	Salt Lake City	(Netherlands) Joy Beune	(Netherlands) Jutta Leerdam	(Netherlands) Elisa Dul
2019	Baselga di Piné	(Netherlands) Femke Kok	(Poland) Karolina Bosiek	(Norway) Ragne Wiklund
2020	Tomaszów Mazowiecki	(Netherlands) Femke Kok	(Netherlands) Robin Groot	(Canada) Alexa Scott
2021	Cancelled due to the COVID-19 pandemic			
2022	Innsbruck	(Netherlands) Jade Groenewoud	(Netherlands) Evelien Vijn	(South Korea) Park Chae-won
2023	Inzell	(Netherlands) Angel Daleman	(United States) Greta Myers	(Netherlands) Jade Groenewoud
2024	Hachinohe	(Netherlands) Angel Daleman	(Norway) Aurora Grinden Løvås	(Netherlands) Meike Veen
2025	Collalbo	(Austria) Jeannine Rosner	(Italy) Emily Tormen	(Netherlands) Jasmijn Veenhuis
2026	Inzell	(Kazakhstan) Kristina Shumekova	(Austria) Jeannine Rosner	(Netherlands) Jasmijn Veenhuis

== See also ==
- ISU Junior World Cup Speed Skating
- List of world cups and world championships for juniors and youth
