= 1989 World Junior Speed Skating Championships =

International speed skating competition

- Venue: Ice Stadium, Kyiv, Ukrainian SSR
- Dates: 3–5 March
- Competitors: 47 (Men) and 35 (Women); 82 (Total) from 20 nations

Medalist men
1st place, gold medalist(s)		Andrey Anufriyenko	URS
2nd place, silver medalist(s)		Rintje Ritsma	NED
3rd place, bronze medalist(s)		Naoki Kotake	JPN

Medalist women
1st place, gold medalist(s)		Ulrike Adeberg	GDR
2nd place, silver medalist(s)		Anke Baier	GDR
3rd place, bronze medalist(s)		Sandra Zwolle	NED

The 1989 World Junior Speed Skating Championships was held on March 3–5, 1989, at the Ice Stadium in Kyiv (Ukrainian SSR). The format of the competition was allround and medals were awarded for overall classification.

== Calendar ==
Date	Events
Friday, March 3	500 meter men 500 meter women 3000 meter men
Saturday, March 4	1000 meter women 1500 meter men 1500 meter women
Sunday, March 5	3000 meter women 5000 meter men

== Participating nations ==
- Austria (3)
- Canada (5)
- East Germany (6)
- Finland (2)
- France (2)
- Great Britain (1)
- Hungary (1)
- Italy (6)
- Japan (6)
- Netherlands (6)
- North Korea (5)
- Norway (6)
- Poland (6)
- Romania (2)
- South Korea (5)
- Soviet Union (5)
- Sweden (3)
- Switzerland (2)
- United States (6)
- West Germany (4)

== Medal summary ==
=== Medal table ===
Rank	Nation	Gold	Silver	Bronze	Total
1	East Germany (GDR)	1	1	0	2
2	Soviet Union (URS)	1	0	0	1
3	Netherlands (NED)	0	1	1	2
4	Japan (JPN)	0	0	1	1
Totals (4 entries)		2	2	2	6

=== Medalists ===
Event	Gold		Silver		Bronze	
Men	Andrey Anufriyenko; Soviet Union	167,202	Rintje Ritsma; Netherlands	169,252	Naoki Kotake; Japan	169,371
Women	Ulrike Adeberg; East Germany	178,356	Anke Baier; East Germany	178,763	Sandra Zwolle; Netherlands	179,038

== Classifications ==
=== Men ===
Rank	Name	Nation	500m	1000m	1500m	5000m	Points
1st place, gold medalist(s)	Andrey Anufriyenko	Soviet Union	1	3	2	6	167,202
2nd place, silver medalist(s)	Rintje Ritsma	Netherlands	29	2	8	2	169,252
3rd place, bronze medalist(s)	Naoki Kotake	Japan	13	8	4	4	169,371
4	Cor-Jan Smulders	Netherlands	17	7	3	3	169,553
5	Uwe Tonat	East Germany	22	4	5	5	169,803
6	Marnix ten Kortenaar	Netherlands	15	5	12	10	170,982
7	Ådne Søndrål	Norway	8	13	6	9	171,167
8	Oh Yeong-Seok	South Korea	20	9	7	11	171,691
9	Uwe Höhnisch	East Germany	38	5	15	7	172,205
10	Nate Mills	United States	5	11	17	14	172,456
11	Junji Tsuchiya	Japan	11	14	26	12	173,703
12	Cam Mackay	Canada	22	15	24	13	174,195
13	Michael Spielmann	East Germany	46f	1	1	1	175,514
14	Artur Drwiega	Poland	44	10	31	8	175,594
15	Rickard Garbell	Sweden	33	16	35	15	176,109
DQ4	Lee In-Hun	South Korea	14	12	13	DQ	172,159
NQ17	Paweł Abratkiewicz	Poland	3	21	11		125,661
NQ18	Kevin Scott	Canada	6	20	14		125,942
NQ19	Sean Ireland	Canada	2	27	9		126,161
NQ20	Harri Ilkka	Finland	4	29	21		127,544
NQ21	Jegal Sung-yeol	South Korea	7	23	30		127,566
NQ22	Magnus Enfeldt	Sweden	9	28	18		127,599
NQ23	Aleksandr Zhelznov	Soviet Union	18	17	23		127,646
NQ24	Tibor Maté	Romania	11	32	16		127,858
NQ25	Bjørn Egil Lundgrenn	Norway	20	22	20		127,970
NQ26	Choi In-Chol	North Korea	24	18	27		127,996
NQ27	Christian Schwaiger	West Germany	36	19	25		128,598
NQ28	Henning Nilsen	Norway	25	25	29		128,814
NQ29	Craig McNicoll	Great Britain	19	30	28		129,113
NQ30	Herbert Haan	Austria	35	33	22		129,699
NQ31	Jevgeni Metel	Switzerland	10	45	19		129,825
NQ32	Giorgio Baroni	Italy	41	24	37		130,421
NQ33	Alessandro De Taddei	Italy	16	37	42		130,569
NQ34	Robert Winkler	West Germany	27	40	33		130,583
NQ35	István Dolp	Hungary	27	38	40		130,967
NQ36	Roland Brunner	Austria	31	41	36		131,186
NQ37	Stéphane Gaumont	France	40	36	34		131,239
NQ38	Jonas Tronêt	Sweden	39	34	39		131,256
NQ39	Paweł Jaroszek	Poland	37	46f	10		131,434
NQ40	Mark Molenda	United States	30	42	43		131,547
NQ41	Franco Giovannini	Italy	42	39	38		131,953
NQ42	Roland Niedermayer	Austria	43	31	44		132,366
NQ43	Thierry Misslin	France	31	43	45		132,416
NQ44	Ryan Vanderboom	United States	34	44	46		133,026
NQ45	Martin Feigenwinter	Switzerland	45	26	32		133,148
NQ46	Chang Jong-Nam	North Korea	26	47	47		134,053
NQ47	Norihiko Araki	Japan	47f	35	41		160,023

=== Women ===
Rank	Name	Nation	500m	1000m	1500m	3000m	Points
1st place, gold medalist(s)	Ulrike Adeberg	East Germany	8	1	1	6	178,356
2nd place, silver medalist(s)	Anke Baier	East Germany	1	2	4	7	178,763
3rd place, bronze medalist(s)	Sandra Zwolle	Netherlands	6	3	3	5	179,038
4	Claudia Pechstein	East Germany	3	10	2	3	179,086
5	Svetlana Bazhanova	Soviet Union	12	8	7	1	180,304
6	Natalia Kozlova	Soviet Union	4	5	6	9	180,458
7	Emese Antal	Romania	10	6	10	10	181,503
8	Tara Laszlo	United States	7	7	11	11	181,556
9	Yelena Mamayeva	Soviet Union	18	15	8	4	182,451
10	Hiromi Yamamoto	Japan	15	22	12	2	182,698
11	Shiho Kusunose	Japan	5	4	5	16	182,821
12	Marion van Zuilen	Netherlands	16	12	14	13	184,307
13	Keiko Horiuchi	Japan	25	18	13	8	184,811
14	Heidi Skjeggestad	Norway	20	11	15	14	185,326
15	Stefanie Teeuwen	West Germany	20	14	16	15	186,241
16	Sandra Voetelink	Netherlands	35f	9	9	12	196,461
NQ17	Kim Chun-Wol	North Korea	2	20	23		135,948
NQ18	Sylvie Cantin	Canada	17	13	18		136,263
NQ19	Kristen Talbot	United States	11	16	24		136,696
NQ20	Chong Chang-Suk	North Korea	13	19	27		137,316
NQ21	Anette Tønsberg	Norway	23	25	17		137,391
NQ22	Aneta Rekas	Poland	24	17	20		137,478
NQ23	Yun Son-Yu	North Korea	9	22	31		137,493
NQ24	Catriona Le May	Canada	14	21	30		137,813
NQ25	Choi Hye-Sook	South Korea	30	24	19		138,361
NQ26	Outi Ylä-Sulkava	Finland	26	26	25		138,866
NQ27	Hege Langli	Norway	28	32	21		139,468
NQ28	Ewa Borkowska	Poland	18	27	32		139,493
NQ29	Manuela Strauß	West Germany	33	29	22		139,860
NQ30	Kim Yoon-Kyung	South Korea	32	31	26		140,451
NQ31	Elke Felicetti	Italy	34	28	29		140,738
NQ32	Elisabetta Pizio	Italy	27	34	28		140,991
NQ33	Mariola Patynowska	Poland	29	33	33		141,931
NQ34	Amy Peterson	United States	22	30	35		142,201
NQ35	Katia Colturi	Italy	30	35	34		143,888
