= 2026–27 ISU Speed Skating World Cup =

World speed skating tournament in Europe and North-America

- Dates: 13 November 2026 – 7 February 2027

The 2026–27 ISU Speed Skating World Cup was a series of six speed skating events that took place between November 2026 and February 2027. The World Cup is organised by the International Skating Union (ISU).

World Cup titles were awarded to the top point earners in the 500m, 1000m, 1500m, Long Distances, Mass Start, and Team Pursuit for men and women, as well as in the Mixed Gender Relay Team.

== Calendar ==
The calendar for the 2026–27 season.

WC #	Location	Venue	Date	500 m	1000 m	1500 m	3000 m	5000 m	10000 m	Mass start	Team pursuit	Team sprint	Mixed relay
1	Beijing	National Speed Skating Oval	13–15 Nov	2m, 2w	m, w	m, w	w	m		m, w	m, w		
2	Obihiro	Meiji Hokkaido-Tokachi Oval	20–22 Nov	2m, 2w	m, w	m, w	w	m			m, w		x
Total				4m, 4w	2m, 2w	2m, 2w	2w	2m		1m, 1w	2m, 2w		1x

== World Cup standings ==
=== Men's 500 Metres ===
Pos	Athlete	Points
1	(China) Lian Ziwen	211
2	(China) Gao Tingyu	205
3	(Netherlands) Stefan Westenbroek	160
4	(Netherlands) Sebas Diniz	154
5	(Japan) Katsuhiro Kuratsubo	152

=== Women's 500 Metres ===
Pos	Athlete	Points
1	(Netherlands) Angel Daleman	240
2	(Netherlands) Femke Kok	210
3	(Netherlands) Suzanne Schulting	198
4	(Poland) Wiktoria Dąbrowska	155
5	(China) Tian Ruining	151

=== Men's 1000 Metres ===
Pos	Athlete	Points
1	(China) Ning Zhongyan	171
2	(China) Lian Ziwen	162
3	(Netherlands) Joep Wennemars	146
4	(Poland) Damian Zurek	120
5	(Netherlands) Tim Prins	111

=== Women's 1000 Metres ===
Pos	Athlete	Points
1	(Netherlands) Angel Daleman	180
2	(Poland) Wiktoria Dąbrowska	144
3	(Kazakhstan) Kristina Shumekova	141
4	(Netherlands) Isabel Grevelt	132
5	(China) Mei Han	114

=== Men's 1500 Metres ===
Pos	Athlete	Points
1	(China) Ning Zhongyan	180
2	(Czech Republic) Metodej Jilek	137
3	(Netherlands) Kjeld Nuis	125
4	(Italy) Daniele Di Stefano	119
5	(Norway) Sander Eitrem	113

=== Women's 1500 Metres ===
Pos	Athlete	Points
1	(Norway) Ragne Wiklund	180
2	(Netherlands) Joy Beune	162
3	(Canada) Valerie Maltais	137
4	(China) Mei Han	132
5	(China) Yang Binyu	116

=== Men's Long Distances ===
Pos	Athlete	Points
1	(Czech Republic) Metodej Jilek	180
2	(Norway) Sander Eitrem	162
3	(Poland) Vladimir Semirunniy	132
4	(Italy) Davide Ghiotto	132
5	(Italy) Riccardo Lorello	130

=== Women's Long Distances ===
Pos	Athlete	Points
1	(Norway) Ragne Wiklund	180
2	(Netherlands) Merel Conijn	146
3	(Netherlands) Joy Beune	144
4	(Individual Neutral Athletes) Kseniia Korzhova	125
5	(Canada) Valerie Maltais	114

=== Men's Mass Start ===
Pos	Athlete	Points
1	(Netherlands) Jorian ten Cate	108
2	(Switzerland) Livio Wenger	97
3	(United States) Ethan Cepuran	86
4	(Belgium) Bart Swings	77
5	(Japan) Shomu Sasaki	72

=== Women's Mass Start ===
Pos	Athlete	Points
1	(Netherlands) Marijke Groenewoud	108
2	(Netherlands) Merel Conijn	97
3	(Canada) Valerie Maltais	86
4	(Austria) Jeannine Rosner	77
5	(South Korea) Park Ji-Woo	72

=== Men's Team Pursuit ===
Pos	Athlete	Points
1	Italy	114
2	Individual Neutral Athletes	100
3	Japan	88
4	Poland	84
5	United States	84

=== Women's Team Pursuit ===
Pos	Athlete	Points
1	Netherlands	114
2	China	102
3	Individual Neutral Athletes	100
4	Canada	84
5	Japan	83

== Medal table ==
Rank	Nation	Gold	Silver	Bronze	Total
1	Netherlands	9	13	6	28
2	China	6	5	5	16
3	Norway	4	3	0	7
4	United States	2	1	3	6
5	Czech Republic	2	0	1	3
6	Individual Neutral Athletes	2	0	0	2
7	Italy	1	1	3	5
8	South Korea	1	0	0	1
9	Poland	0	1	4	5
10	Japan	0	1	1	2
11	Kazakhstan	0	1	0	1
11	Switzerland	0	1	0	1
13	Canada	0	0	4	4
Totals (13 entries)		27	27	27	81
