= List of German records in speed skating =

The following are the national records in speed skating in Germany maintained by the Deutsche Eisschnelllauf-Gemeinschaft (DESG).

== Men ==
Event	Record	Athlete	Date	Meet	Place	Ref
500 meters	34.32	Joel Dufter	5 December 2021	World Cup	Salt Lake City, United States	
500 meters × 2	70.10	Nico Ihle	10 February 2014	Olympic Games	Sochi, Russia	
1000 meters	1:06.48	Finn Sonnekalb	14 November 2025	World Cup	Salt Lake City, United States	
1500 meters	1:41.33	Finn Sonnekalb	15 November 2025	World Cup	Salt Lake City, United States	
3000 meters	3:37.31	Patrick Beckert	7 November 2015	Time Trials	Calgary, Canada	
5000 meters	6:06.75	Gabriel Groß	14 November 2025	World Cup	Salt Lake City, United States	
10000 meters	12:43.42	Felix Maly	25 January 2025	World Cup	Calgary, Canada	
Team sprint (3 laps)	1:18.80	Moritz Klein; Stefan Emele; Hendrik Dombek	15 February 2024	World Single Distances Championships	Calgary, Canada	
Team pursuit (8 laps)	3:39.17	Patrick Beckert; Felix Maly; Fridtjof Petzold	16 November 2025	World Cup	Salt Lake City, United States	
Sprint combination	136.855 pts	Nico Ihle	25–26 February 2017	World Sprint Championships	Calgary, Canada	
Small combination	148.983 pts	Robert Lehmann	18–19 March 2009	Olympic Oval Final	Calgary, Canada	
Big combination	152.044 pts	Moritz Geisreiter	11–13 January 2013	European Championships	Heerenveen, Netherlands	

== Women ==
Event	Record	Athlete	Date	Meet	Place	Ref
500 meters	37.00	Jenny Wolf	11 December 2009	World Cup	Salt Lake City, United States	
500 meters × 2	74.42	Jenny Wolf	10 March 2007	World Single Distance Championships	Salt Lake City, United States	
1000 meters	1:13.49	Anni Friesinger	18 November 2007	World Cup	Calgary, Canada	
1500 meters	1:53.09	Anni Friesinger	17 November 2007	World Cup	Calgary, Canada	
3000 meters	3:56.80	Stephanie Beckert	4 December 2009	World Cup	Calgary, Canada	
5000 meters	6:46.91	Claudia Pechstein	23 February 2002	Olympic Games	Salt Lake City, United States	
10000 meters	14:22.60	Gunda Niemann-Stirnemann	27 March 1994		Calgary, Canada	
Team sprint (3 laps)	1:27.63	Marlen Ehseluns; Sophie Warmuth; Anna Ostlender	26 January 2025	World Cup	Calgary, Canada	
Team pursuit (6 laps)	2:54.38	Josie Hofmann; Josephine Schlörb; Lea Sophie Scholz	16 November 2025	World Cup	Salt Lake City, United States	
Sprint combination	149.305 pts	Monique Garbrecht-Enfeldt	11–12 January 2003	World Cup	Salt Lake City, United States	
Mini combination	160.277 pts	Lea Sophie Scholz	9–10 March 2018	World Junior Championships	Salt Lake City, United States	
Small combination	158.265 pts	Claudia Pechstein	18–19 March 2006	World Allround Championships	Calgary, Canada	

== Mixed ==
Event	Record	Athlete	Date	Meet	Place	Ref
Relay	2:58.62	Stefan Emele; Anna Ostlender	23 November 2025	World Cup	Calgary, Canada	
