= Finn Sonnekalb =

German speed skater (born 2007)

Personal information
- Born: 3 March 2007 (age 19)
- Home town: Erfurt, Germany
- Height: 1.93 m (6 ft 4 in)

Sport
- Sport: Speed skating
- Club: ESC Erfurt
Medal record
Men's speed skating
Representing Germany
Winter Youth Olympics
| Gold medal – first place | 2024 Gangwon | 500 m |
| Gold medal – first place | 2024 Gangwon | 1500 m |
| Gold medal – first place | 2024 Gangwon | Mass start |
World Junior Championships
| Gold medal – first place | 2025 Collalbo | 1000 m |
| Gold medal – first place | 2025 Collalbo | 1500 m |
| Gold medal – first place | 2025 Collalbo | Overall |
| Gold medal – first place | 2026 Inzell | 500 m |
| Gold medal – first place | 2026 Inzell | 1000 m |
| Gold medal – first place | 2026 Inzell | 1500 m |
| Gold medal – first place | 2026 Inzell | Overall |
| Gold medal – first place | 2026 Inzell | Team sprint |
| Silver medal – second place | 2024 Hachinohe | 1500 m |
| Silver medal – second place | 2024 Hachinohe | Overall |
| Bronze medal – third place | 2024 Hachinohe | 1000 m |
| Bronze medal – third place | 2025 Collalbo | 500 m |
| Bronze medal – third place | 2025 Collalbo | Team sprint |
| Bronze medal – third place | 2026 Inzell | Team pursuit |

Finn Sonnekalb (born 3 March 2007) is a German speed skater. He is the 2025 and 2026 Junior World Champion.

== Career ==
Sonnekalb represented Germany at the 2024 Winter Youth Olympics. On 22 January 2024, during the first day of the speed skating events, he won a gold medal in the 500 metres with a time of 36.61. The next day he won a gold medal in the 1500 metres with a time of 1:50.53. On 26 January, during the final day of the speed skating events, he won a gold medal in the mass start with a time of 5:30.07. He competed at the 2025 World Junior Speed Skating Championships and won gold in the 1000 metres, 1500 metres and overll event. He became the first German to win the World Junior Speed Skating Championships overall title since Michael Spielmann in 1988.

During the first World Cup event of the 2025–26 ISU Speed Skating World Cup on 15 November 2025, he earned his first career senior World Cup podium finish, finishing in third place with a World junior and German record time of 1:41.33. During the second World Cup event a week later on 22 November 2025, he finished in second place in the 1500 metres with a time of 1:42.31, trailing only Jordan Stolz.

On 20 January 2026, he was selected to represent Germany at the 2026 Winter Olympics. He finished qualification ranked fourth in the 1500 metres and fifth in the 1000 metres standings. During the Olympics he finished in 12th place in the 1000 metres and 13th place in the 1500 metres. He then competed at the 2026 World Junior Speed Skating Championships and won gold medals in the 500 metres, 1000 metres, and 1500 metres, and defended his overall title from 2025.
