= Sylke Luding =

East German speed skater

Personal information
- Born: 1 December 1968 (age 57)

Sport
- Country: East Germany
- Sport: Speed skating
- Club: SC Einheit Dresden
Medal record
Women's speed skating
Representing East Germany
World Junior Championships
Bronze medal – third place	1987 Strömsund	Allround
Representing SC Einheit Dresden German Single Distance Championships
Bronze medal – third place	1986 Chemnitz	500 m
Bronze medal – third place	1987 Berlin	500 m
Bronze medal – third place	1987 Berlin	1000 m

Sylke Luding (born 1 December 1968) is a former East German long track speed skater, who was active between 1982 and 1991. She was a member of SC Einheit Dresden and the East Germany national sprint team and represented her nation at international competitions.

== Junior level ==
As a junior she won the bronze medal at the 1987 World Junior Speed Skating Championships. At the end of the season she set three world records during an international competition between East Germany and the Soviet Union. She set twice the 500 metre world record. Besides of that she set the sprint classification world record. For several years skaters struggled with this time. The record was ( with already further developed ice skates) finally broken in November 1990 by Kyoko Shimazaki.

== Senior level ==
At elite level she made her ISU Speed Skating World Cup debut during the 1985–86 ISU Speed Skating World Cup in the sprint distances in Davos and Berlin. She had three top-8 classifications at the World Cups. She rode her last World Cup race during the 1987–88 ISU Speed Skating World Cup in Berlin. Due to an injury she couldn't start at 1989–90 ISU Speed Skating World Cup events. She also competed at other international competitions.

She won three bronze medals at the German Single Distance Championships in the 500 metres (2x) and 1000 metres (1x). Between 1985 and 1990 she had at least 10 starts at national championships. She had tough skating competition from her teammates in SC Einheit Dresden which was in the world top class from the skaters Karin Kania (olympic champion), Andrea Ehrig (olympic champion), Christa Rothenburger (olympic champion), Skadi Walter (olympic top-5), Carola Bürger and Heike Pöhland.

== Records ==
=== Personal records ===
Personal records
Women's speed skating
Event	Result	Date	Location	Notes
500 m	40,89	21.03.1987	Medeo	
1000 m	1.22,84	20.03.1987	Medeo	
1500 m	2.16,83	01.03.1987	Strömsund	
3000 m	4.52,24	28.02.1987	Strömsund	

== Family and coach ==
Sylke Luding is the daughter of the successful speed skating coach Ernst Luding. Ernst Luding coached his daughter in sprint speed skating and track cycling from 1984 to 1991, together with Christa Rothenburger Luding.
