= Tyson Langelaar =

Canadian speed skater (born 1999)

Personal information
- Born: 17 February 1999 (age 27) Winnipeg, Manitoba, Canada

Sport
- Country: Canada
- Sport: Speed skating
- Turned pro: 2019

Achievements and titles
- Olympic finals: 22nd (Beijing 2022)
Medal record
Junior World Championships
Silver medal – second place	2018 Salt Lake City	All Around
Silver medal – second place	2017 Helsinki	Team Sprint
Bronze medal – third place	2017 Helsinki	All Around

Tyson Langelaar (born 17 February 1999) is a Canadian long track speed skater who specializes in the 1000m and 1500m distances.

== Career ==
In February 2017, Langelaar won the bronze medal at the 2017 World Junior Speed Skating Championships in Helsinki, Finland. At the 2018 World Junior Speed Skating Championships in Utah, United States he finished second overall behind Allan Dahl Johansson.

In 2019 he turned professional. Langelaar finished fifth in the 1500m race at the 2019–20 ISU World Cup No. 2 in Tomaszów Mazowiecki.

== Personal records ==
Personal records
Speed skating
Event	Result	Date	Location	Notes
500 m	35.67	9 March 2018	Utah Olympic Oval, Salt Lake City	
1000 m	1:08.77	19 October 2019	Olympic Oval, Calgary	
1500 m	1:44.98	4 January 2019	Olympic Oval, Calgary	
5000 m	6:28.97	30 November 2018	Olympic Oval, Calgary	
