= 2017 World Junior Speed Skating Championships =

International speed skating competition

- Venue: Oulunkylä sports park artificial ice rink, Helsinki, Finland
- Dates: 17–19 February

Medalist men
1st place, gold medalist(s)		Chris Huizinga	NED
2nd place, silver medalist(s)		Allan Dahl Johansson	NOR
3rd place, bronze medalist(s)		Tyson Langelaar	CAN

Medalist women
1st place, gold medalist(s)		Jutta Leerdam	NED
2nd place, silver medalist(s)		Joy Beune	NED
3rd place, bronze medalist(s)		Sanne in 't Hof	NED

The 2017 World Junior Speed Skating Championships took place from 17 to 19 February 2017 in Helsinki, Finland. They were the 44th World Junior Speed Skating Championships.

== Medal summary ==
=== Medal table ===
Rank	Nation	Gold	Silver	Bronze	Total
1	Netherlands (NED)	9	8	3	20
2	Japan (JPN)	2	2	0	4
3	Norway (NOR)	2	1	1	4
4	Russia (RUS)	2	0	2	4
5	China (CHN)	1	2	0	3
6	Canada (CAN)	0	1	7	8
7	Italy (ITA)	0	1	1	2
7	South Korea (KOR)	0	1	1	2
9	Germany (GER)	0	0	1	1
Totals (9 entries)		16	16	16	48

=== Men ===
Event	Gold		Silver		Bronze	
Overall	Chris Huizinga (NED)	155.443	Allan Dahl Johansson (NOR)	156.518	Tyson Langelaar (CAN)	158.064
500 m	Koki Kubo (JPN)	36.86	Sun Xuefeng (CHN)	36.90	Ruslan Zakharov (RUS)	37.31
1000 m	Allan Dahl Johansson (NOR)	1:14.25	Koki Kubo (JPN)	1:14.29	Tyson Langelaar (CAN)	1:14.91
1500 m	Allan Dahl Johansson (NOR)	1:54.05	Chris Huizinga (NED)	1:55.12	Tyson Langelaar (CAN)	1:55.66
5000 m	Chris Huizinga (NED)	6:46.40	Marwin Talsma (NED)	6:56.45	Graeme Fish (CAN)	6:58.48
Mass start	Chris Huizinga (NED)	30 pts	Oh Hyun-min (KOR)	20 pts	Graeme Fish (CAN)	10 pts
Team Pursuit	Japan; Riki Hayashi; Riku Tsuchiya; Aoi Yokoyama	4:09.65	Netherlands; Chris Huizinga; Tijmen Snel; Marwin Talsma	4:11.08	Norway; Marius Bratli; Magnus Bakken Haugli; Allan Dahl Johansson	4:14.09
Team Sprint	Netherlands; Niek Deelstra; Thijs Govers; Tijmen Snel	1:25.65	Canada; Connor Howe; David La Rue; Tyson Langelaar	1:25.94	Germany; Ole Jeske; Jeremias Marx; Max Reder	1:26.10

=== Women ===
Event	Gold		Silver		Bronze	
Overall	Jutta Leerdam (NED)	171.973	Joy Beune (NED)	172.443	Sanne in 't Hof (NED)	173.376
500 m	Daria Kachanova (RUS)	39.90	Sun Nan (CHN)	40.95	Jutta Leerdam (NED)	41.10
1000 m	Daria Kachanova (RUS)	1:21.87	Joy Beune (NED)	1:23.06	Béatrice Lamarche (CAN)	1:23.52
1500 m	Jutta Leerdam (NED)	2:07.29	Sanne in 't Hof (NED)	2:08.09	Daria Kachanova (RUS)	2:08.33
3000 m	Joy Beune (NED)	4:35.90	Sanne in 't Hof (NED)	4:37.14	Jutta Leerdam (NED)	4:38.27
Mass start	Elisa Dul (NED)	30 pts	Sanne in 't Hof (NED)	21 pts	Béatrice Lamarche (CAN)	10 pts
Team Pursuit	Netherlands; Joy Beune; Sanne in 't Hof; Jutta Leerdam	3:23.43	Japan; Kanako Iijima; Moe Kitahara; Yuna Toshimura	3:26.04	Italy; Noemi Bonazza; Ciara Cristelli; Deborah Grisenti	3:27.08
Team Sprint	China; Li Huawei; Sun Nan; Yang Sining	1:34.86	Italy; Noemi Bonazza; Chiara Cristelli; Deborah Grisenti	1:35.18	South Korea; Hwang Da-som; Kim Ha-eun; Um Chae-lin	1:35.54
