= Han Mei =

Han Mei may refer to:

- Han Mei (musician), Chinese-Canadian guzheng performer and scholar
- Han Mei (speed skater) (born 1998), Chinese speed skater
