= Marie-France van Helden =

French speed skater (born 1959)

Personal information
- Born: 30 September 1959 (age 66) Cannes, France
- Height: 1.60 m (5 ft 3 in)
- Weight: 57 kg (126 lb)

Sport
- Sport: Speed skating
- Club: CEPG Paris

Marie-France van Helden (née Vives; born 30 September 1959) is a retired French speed skater. She competed at the 1988 Winter Olympics in 500 m and 3000 m and finished in 27th and 24th place, respectively. In 1980 she married Hans van Helden, a Dutch speed skater who later changed his nationality to French.

Personal bests:

- 500 m – 42.49 (1988)
- 1000 m – 1:25.7 (1986)
- 1500 m – 2:11.64 (1986)
- 3000 m – 4:32.44 (1988)
- 5000 m – 8:14.31 (1987)
