= Kristina Shumekova =

Kazakhstani speed skater (born 2006)

Personal information
- Native name: Кристина Шумекова
- Born: 31 October 2006 (age 19)

Sport
- Country: Kazakhstan
- Sport: Speed skating
- Event(s): 500 m, 1000 m, 1500 m
Medal record
Women's speed skating
Representing Kazakhstan
World Junior Championships
Gold medal – first place	2026 Inzell	500 m
Gold medal – first place	2026 Inzell	1000 m
Gold medal – first place	2026 Inzell	1500 m
Gold medal – first place	2026 Inzell	Overall
Gold medal – first place	2026 Inzell	Team sprint
Silver medal – second place	2024 Hachinohe	Team sprint
Silver medal – second place	2026 Inzell	3000 m
Bronze medal – third place	2024 Hachinohe	Team pursuit

Kristina Shumekova (Russian: Кристина Шумекова; born 31 October 2006) is a Kazakhstani speed skater. She is the 2026 Junior World Champion.

== Career ==
Shumekova represented Kazakhstan at the 2024 Winter Youth Olympics and finished in seventh place in both the 500 metres and 1500 metres events.

Shumekova competed at the 2026 World Junior Speed Skating Championships and won gold medals in the 500 metres, 1000 metres, 1500 metres and overall events. She also won a silver medal in the 3000 metres. She became the first Kazakh speed skater to win three distances at the World Junior Speed Skating Championships and claim the overall title.

== Personal life ==
Shumekova's twin sister, Alina, and older sister, Inessa, are both speed skaters.
