= Bronislav Snetkov =

Soviet speed skater

Personal information
- Native name: Бронислав Снетков
- Full name: Bronislav Snetkov
- Nationality: Russian
- Born: 24 November 1967 (age 57); Saint Petersburg, Russia
- Height: 182 cm (6 ft 0 in)
- Weight: 82 kg (181 lb)

Sport
- Country: Soviet Union; CIS; Russia
- Sport: Speed skating

Bronislav Snetkov (Russian: Бронислав Снетков; born 24 November 1967) is a Soviet speed skater. He competed in two events at the 1992 Winter Olympics.
