= 2025 World Junior Speed Skating Championships =

International speed skating competition

2025 ISU World Junior Speed Skating Championships
- Venue: Ritten Arena, Collalbo, Italy
- Dates: 7–9 February

Medalist men
1st place, gold medalist(s)		Finn Sonnekalb	Germany
2nd place, silver medalist(s)		Metoděj Jílek	Czech Republic
3rd place, bronze medalist(s)		Didrik Eng Strand	Norway

Medalist women
1st place, gold medalist(s)		Jeannine Rosner	Austria
2nd place, silver medalist(s)		Emily Tormen	Italy
3rd place, bronze medalist(s)		Jasmijn Veenhuis	Netherlands

The 2025 World Junior Speed Skating Championships took place from 7 to 9 February 2025 in Collalbo, Italy.

== Schedule ==
All times are local (UTC+1).

Date	Time	Events
7 February	13:30	500 m women 500 m men 1500 m women 1500 m men Mass start semifinals women Mass start semifinals men
8 February	14:00	1000 m women 1000 m men 3000 m women 5000 m men
9 February	14:00	Team pursuit women Team pursuit men Team sprint women Team sprint men Mass start final women Mass start final men Mixed relay

== Medal summary ==
=== Medal table ===
* Host nation (Italy)

Rank	Nation	Gold	Silver	Bronze	Total
1	Austria	4	0	0	4
2	Germany	3	1	2	6
3	Japan	2	4	3	9
4	Canada	2	1	1	4
4	Czech Republic	2	1	1	4
6	Poland	1	3	2	6
7	Norway	1	2	2	5
8	Netherlands	1	1	3	5
9	Portugal	1	0	0	1
10	Italy*	0	2	0	2
11	South Korea	0	1	1	2
12	Spain	0	1	0	1
13	United States	0	0	2	2
Totals (13 entries)		17	17	17	51

=== Men's events ===
Event	Gold		Silver		Bronze	
500 m	Jalen Doan; Canada	35.83	Fuga Tsujimoto; Japan	35.84	Finn Sonnekalb; Germany	35.91
1000 m	Finn Sonnekalb; Germany	1:10.30	Didrik Eng Strand; Norway	1:10.91	Jalen Doan; Canada	1:10.93
1500 m	Finn Sonnekalb; Germany	1:48.73	Didrik Eng Strand; Norway	1:48.771	Metoděj Jílek; Czech Republic	1:48.778
5000 m	Metoděj Jílek; Czech Republic	6:19.94	Taiga Sasaki; Japan	6:32.42	Sil van der Veen; Netherlands	6:32.73
Mass start	Metoděj Jílek; Czech Republic	33 pts	Shomu Sasaki; Japan	20 pts	William Silk; United States	10 pts
Team pursuit	Japan; Shomu Sasaki; Taiga Sasaki; Taiki Shingai	3:52.99	Netherlands; Sil van der Veen; Mats Bendijk; Mika Kolder	3:57.83	Norway; Filip Møller Nordal; Didrik Eng Strand; Eirik Andersen	3:59.16
Team sprint	Norway; Arne Lernes; Miika Johan Klevstuen; Didrik Eng Strand	1:22.98	Poland; Szymon Hostyński; Mikołaj Bielas; Mateusz Śliwka	1:23.35	Germany; Lennart Grabe; Levente Engst; Finn Sonnekalb	1:24.20
Overall classification	Finn Sonnekalb; Germany	147.865	Metoděj Jílek; Czech Republic	148.005	Didrik Eng Strand; Norway	148.086

=== Women's events ===
Event	Gold		Silver		Bronze	
500 m	Shizuko Okuaki; Japan	39.00	Jung Hui-dan; South Korea	39.30	Hanna Mazur; Poland	39.44
1000 m	Jeannine Rosner; Austria	1:18.48	Hanna Mazur; Poland	1:19.42	Shizuko Okuaki; Japan	1:19.96
1500 m	Jeannine Rosner; Austria	2:01.60	Ayano Sekiguchi; Japan	2:02.43	Hanna Mazur; Poland	2:03.73
3000 m	Jeannine Rosner; Austria	4:16.89	Emily Tormen; Italy	4:18.62	Jasmijn Veenhuis; Netherlands	4:22.18
Mass start	Jéssica Rodrigues; Portugal	32 pts	Ona Rodríguez; Spain	21 pts	Marley Soldan; United States	10 pts
Team pursuit	Netherlands; Jasmijn Veenhuis; Rosalie van Vliet; Britt Breider	3:09.94	Poland; Zofia Braun; Hanna Mazur; Emilia Zawisza	3:12.67	Japan; Ayano Sekiguchi; Tomoka Okuaki; Saki Judo	3:15.69
Team sprint	Poland; Wiktoria Dąbrowska; Julia Grzywińska; Hanna Mazur	1:32.33	Canada; Isabelle Champagne; Julia Snelgrove; Skylar Van Horne	1:32.67	South Korea; Lee Je-in; Jung Hui-dan; Lim Lee-won	1:32.78
Overall classification	Jeannine Rosner; Austria	162.508	Emily Tormen; Italy	166.493	Jasmijn Veenhuis; Netherlands	167.236

=== Mixed event ===
Event	Gold		Silver		Bronze	
Relay	Canada; Julia Snelgrove; Jalen Doan	3:05.16	Germany; Sofie Adeberg; Tomy Nguyen	3:05.45	Japan; Shizuko Okuaki; Sota Kubo	3:06.68
