= Ulrike Adeberg =

German speed skater

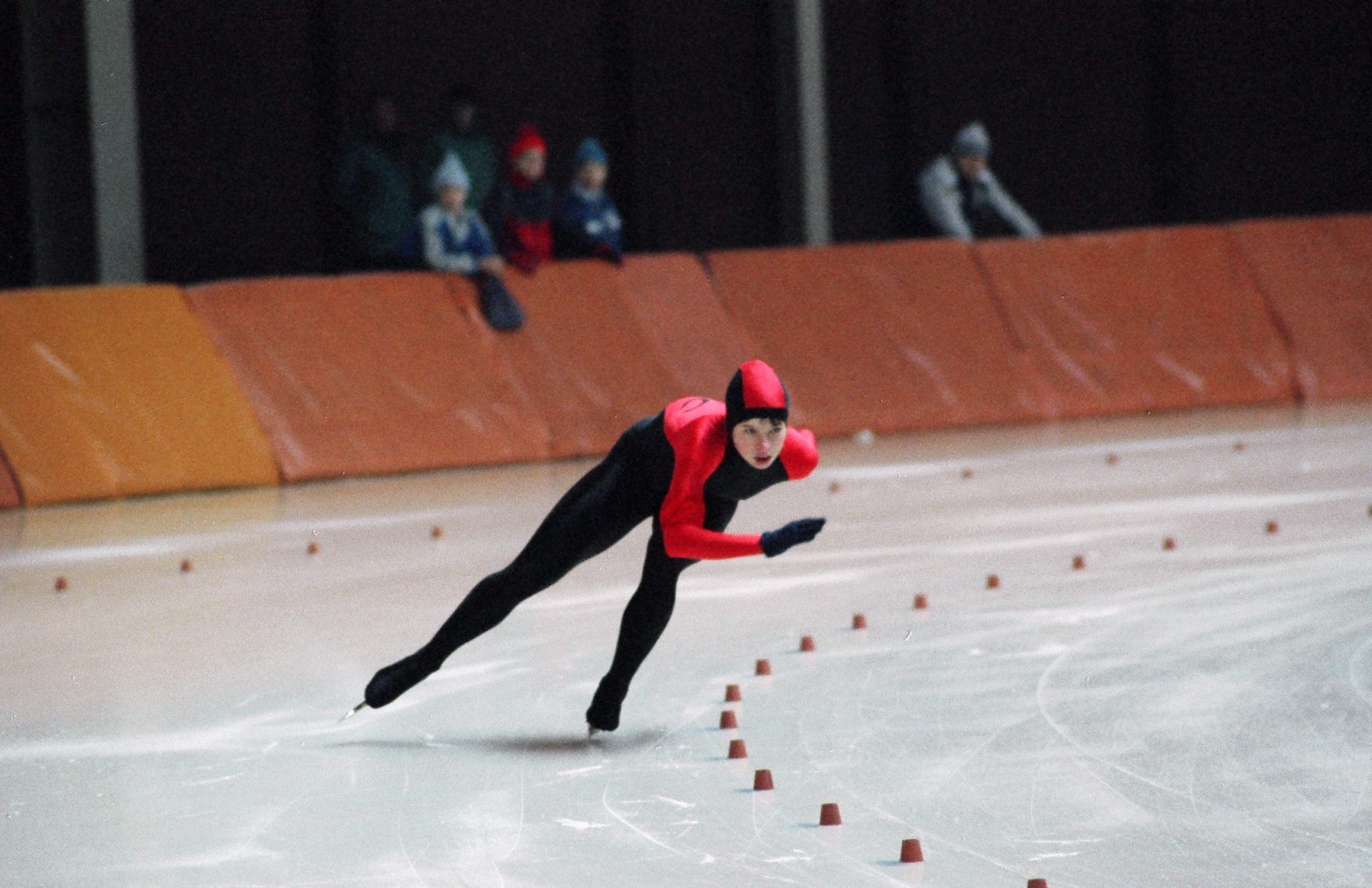
- Ulrike Adeberg in 1989

Personal information
- Nationality: German
- Born: 29 December 1970 (age 55) Merseburg, East Germany
- Height: 1.70 m (5 ft 7 in)
- Weight: 60 kg (130 lb)

Sport
- Sport: Speed skating

Ulrike Adeberg (married Spielmann) (born 29 December 1970) is a German speed skater. She competed in the 1994 Winter Olympics.
