= 2025–26 ISU Speed Skating World Cup – World Cup 3 =

Ice skating competition in Heerenveen, Netherlands

2025–26 ISU Speed Skating World Cup 3
- Venue: Thialf; Heerenveen; Netherlands
- Dates: 5 — 7 December 2025

The third competition weekend of the 2025–26 ISU Speed Skating World Cup was held at Thialf in Heerenveen, Netherlands, from Friday, 5 December, until Sunday, 7 December 2025. It is the third of four events that determine qualification for speed skating at the 2026 Winter Olympics.

== Medal summary ==
=== Men's events ===
Event	Gold	Time	Silver	Time	Bronze	Time	Report
500 m	Jordan Stolz; United States	33.90; TR	Jenning de Boo; Netherlands	34.10	Wataru Morishige; Japan	34.30	
1000 m	Jordan Stolz; United States	1:06.38; TR	Finn Sonnekalb; Germany	1:07.42	Tim Prins; Netherlands	1:07.49	
1500 m	Jordan Stolz; United States	1:42.55; TR	Kjeld Nuis; Netherlands	1:43.31	Ning Zhongyan; China	1:43.87	
10000 m	Metoděj Jílek; Czech Republic	12:29.63; PB	Davide Ghiotto; Italy	12:33.37	Timothy Loubineaud; France	12:36.61; PB	
Mass start^{A}	Jorrit Bergsma; Netherlands	63	Chung Jae-won; South Korea	40	Bart Hoolwerf; Netherlands	20	
Team sprint	Netherlands; Stefan Westenbroek; Jenning de Boo; Tim Prins	1:17.22	United States; Zach Stoppelmoor; Cooper McLeod; Conor McDermott-Mostowy	1:18.16	Norway; Siver Brattgjerd; Henrik Fagerli Rukke; Bjørn Magnussen	1:19.02	

^{A} In mass start, race points are accumulated during the race based on results of the intermediate sprints and the final sprint. The skater with most race points is the winner.

=== Women's events ===
Event	Gold	Time	Silver	Time	Bronze	Time	Report
500 m	Femke Kok; Netherlands	37.00	Jutta Leerdam; Netherlands	37.36	Marrit Fledderus; Netherlands	37.53	
1000 m	Jutta Leerdam; Netherlands	1:14.17	Miho Takagi; Japan	1:14.29	Femke Kok; Netherlands	1:14.46	
1500 m	Joy Beune; Netherlands	1:53.10	Antoinette Rijpma-de Jong; Netherlands	1:53.36	Ivanie Blondin; Canada	1:53.43	
5000 m	Ragne Wiklund; Norway	6:49.01	Isabelle Weidemann; Canada	6:50.11	Joy Beune; Netherlands	6:51.83	
Mass start^{A}	Marijke Groenewoud; Netherlands	63	Mia Manganello; United States	40	Park Ji-woo; South Korea	20	
Team sprint	Netherlands; Anna Boersma; Marrit Fledderus; Femke Kok	1:25.18	Canada; Brooklyn McDougall; Béatrice Lamarche; Ivanie Blondin	1:26.05	Poland; Martyna Baran; Kaja Ziomek-Nogal; Karolina Bosiek	1:26.65	

^{A} In mass start, race points are accumulated during the race based on results of the intermediate sprints and the final sprint. The skater with most race points is the winner.

== Medal count ==
* Host nation (Netherlands)

Rank	Nation	Gold	Silver	Bronze	Total
1	Netherlands*	7	4	5	16
2	United States	3	2	0	5
3	Norway	1	0	1	2
4	Czech Republic	1	0	0	1
5	Canada	0	2	1	3
6	Japan	0	1	1	2
6	South Korea	0	1	1	2
8	Germany	0	1	0	1
8	Italy	0	1	0	1
10	China	0	0	1	1
10	France	0	0	1	1
10	Poland	0	0	1	1
Totals (12 entries)		12	12	12	36

== Results ==
=== Men's events ===
==== 500 m ====
The race started on 7 December 2025 at 14:43.

Rank	Pair	Lane	Name	Country	Time	Diff	WC Points
1st place, gold medalist(s)	9	i	Jordan Stolz	United States	33.90; TR		60
2nd place, silver medalist(s)	8	i	Jenning de Boo	Netherlands	34.10	+0.20	54
3rd place, bronze medalist(s)	9	o	Wataru Morishige	Japan	34.30	+0.40	48
4	6	i	Marek Kania	Poland	34.33	+0.43	43
5	2	o	Katsuhiro Kuratsubo	Japan	34.35	+0.45	40
6	6	o	Laurent Dubreuil	Canada	34.39	+0.49	38
7	8	o	Kim Jun-ho	South Korea	34.43	+0.53	36
8	5	o	Bjørn Magnussen	Norway	34.47	34.47	34
9	4	o	Sebas Diniz	Netherlands	34.53	+0.63	32
10	5	i	Yevgeniy Koshkin	Kazakhstan	34.54	+0.64	31
11	10	o	Damian Żurek	Poland	34.57	+0.67	30
12	7	o	Xue Zhiwen	China	34.64	+0.74	29
13	10	i	Gao Tingyu	China	34.71	+0.81	28
14	2	i	Tatsuya Shinhama	Japan	34.74	+0.84	27
15	3	i	Lian Ziwen	China	34.78	+0.88	26
16	7	i	Cooper McLeod	United States	34.80	+0.90	25
17	4	i	Marten Liiv	Estonia	34.82	+0.92	24
18	1	i	Koo Kyung-min	South Korea	34.83	+0.93	23
19	3	o	Joep Wennemars	Netherlands	DNF		22
	1	o	Stefan Westenbroek	Netherlands	DQ		0

==== 1000 m ====
The race started on 6 December 2025 at 17:12.

Rank	Pair	Lane	Name	Country	Time	Diff	WC Points
1st place, gold medalist(s)	8	o	Jordan Stolz	United States	1:06.38; TR		60
2nd place, silver medalist(s)	6	o	Finn Sonnekalb	Germany	1:07.42	+1.04	54
3rd place, bronze medalist(s)	10	o	Tim Prins	Netherlands	1:07.49	+1.11	48
4	8	i	Jenning de Boo	Netherlands	1:07.60	+1.22	43
5	7	o	Ning Zhongyan	China	1:07.70	+1.32	40
6	9	o	Joep Wennemars	Netherlands	1:07.75	+1.37	38
7	1	i	Kjeld Nuis	Netherlands	1:07.83	+1.45	36
8	9	i	Damian Żurek	Poland	1:07.85	+1.47	34
9	7	i	Marten Liiv	Estonia	1:07.93	+1.55	32
10	5	i	Ryota Kojima	Japan	1:08.00	+1.62	31
11	4	i	Conor McDermott-Mostowy	United States	1:08.21	+1.83	30
12	10	i	Cooper McLeod	United States	1:08.33	+1.95	29
13	4	o	Marek Kania	Poland	1:08.35	+1.97	28
14	5	o	Taiyo Nonomura	Japan	1:08.45	+2.07	27
15	6	i	Lian Ziwen	China	1:08.48	+2.10	26
16	3	i	Hendrik Dombek	Germany	1:08.65	+2.27	25
17	2	i	Mathias Vosté	Belgium	1:08.77	+2.39	24
18	2	o	Piotr Michalski	Poland	1:08.82	+2.44	23
19	1	o	Kazuya Yamada	Japan	1:08.87	+2.49	22
20	3	o	Moritz Klein	Germany	1:09.05	+2.67	21

==== 1500 m ====
The race started on 5 December 2025 at 20:06.

Rank	Pair	Lane	Name	Country	Time	Diff	WC Points
1st place, gold medalist(s)	8	o	Jordan Stolz	United States	1:42.55; TR		60
2nd place, silver medalist(s)	10	o	Kjeld Nuis	Netherlands	1:43.31	+0.76	54
3rd place, bronze medalist(s)	10	i	Ning Zhongyan	China	1:43.87	+1.32	48
4	9	o	Finn Sonnekalb	Germany	1:44.28	+1.73	43
5	9	i	Tim Prins	Netherlands	1:44.82	+2.27	40
6	8	i	Joep Wennemars	Netherlands	1:44.86	+2.31	38
7	2	i	Sander Eitrem	Norway	1:44.95	+2.40	36
8	6	o	Tijmen Snel	Netherlands	1:44.99	+2.44	34
9	7	i	Peder Kongshaug	Norway	1:45.07	+2.52	32
10	4	o	Gabriel Odor	Austria	1:45.09	+2.54	31
11	1	i	Alexander Farthofer	Austria	1:45.45	+2.90	30
12	6	i	Daniele Di Stefano	Italy	1:45.60	+3.05	29
13	3	i	Didrik Eng Strand	Norway	1:45.85	+3.30	28
14	5	i	Wesly Dijs	Netherlands	1:45.86	+3.31	27
15	7	o	Kazuya Yamada	Japan	1:45.90	+3.35	26
16	1	o	Valentin Thiebault	France	1:45.98	+3.43	25
17	2	o	Hendrik Dombek	Germany	1:46.19	+3.64	24
18	3	o	Kim Min-seok	Hungary	1:46.21	+3.66	23
19	5	o	Liu Hanbin	China	1:46.67	+4.12	22
20	4	i	Taiyo Nonomura	Japan	1:46.83	+4.28	21

==== 10000 m ====
The race started on 6 December 2025 at 14:15.

Rank	Pair	Lane	Name	Country	Time	Diff	WC Points
1st place, gold medalist(s)	5	i	Metoděj Jílek	Czech Republic	12:29.63; PB		60
2nd place, silver medalist(s)	3	i	Davide Ghiotto	Italy	12:33.37	+3.74	54
3rd place, bronze medalist(s)	5	o	Timothy Loubineaud	France	12:36.61; PB	+6.98	48
4	4	i	Sander Eitrem	Norway	12:41.34	+11.71	43
5	2	i	Jorrit Bergsma	Netherlands	12:45.46	+15.83	40
6	4	o	Casey Dawson	United States	12:48.42	+18.79	38
7	6	i	Ted-Jan Bloemen	Canada	12:51.21	+21.58	36
8	6	o	Chris Huizinga	Netherlands	12:58.04	+28.41	34
9	3	o	Michele Malfatti	Italy	13:01.63	+32.00	32
10	1	o	Beau Snellink	Netherlands	13:04.77	+35.14	31
11	2	o	Felix Maly	Germany	13:08.13	+38.50	30
12	1	i	Alexander Farthofer	Austria	13:13.55; PB	+43.92	29

==== Mass start ====
The race started on 7 December 2025 at 15:51.

Rank	Name	Country	Points	Time	WC Points
1st place, gold medalist(s)	Jorrit Bergsma	Netherlands	63	7:24.96	60
2nd place, silver medalist(s)	Chung Jae-won	South Korea	40	7:25.56	54
3rd place, bronze medalist(s)	Bart Hoolwerf	Netherlands	20	7:25.94	48
4	Bart Swings	Belgium	10	7:26.06	43
5	Andrea Giovannini	Italy	8	7:26.22	40
6	Metoděj Jílek	Czech Republic	6	7:39.88	38
7	Livio Wenger	Switzerland	3	7:26.40	36
8	Mathieu Belloir	France	2	7:38.75	34
9	Timothy Loubineaud	France	2	7:51.26	32
10	Li Yuhaochen	China	1	7:26.58	31
11	Viktor Hald Thorup	Denmark	1	7:30.34	30
12	Felix Maly	Germany	1	7:40.59	29
13	Daniele Di Stefano	Italy		7:26.59	28
14	Indra Medard	Belgium		7:27.03	27
15	Fridtjof Petzold	Germany		7:29.68	26
16	Didrik Eng Strand	Norway		7:30.67	25
17	Ethan Cepuran	United States		7:32.75	24
18	Antoine Gélinas-Beaulieu	Canada		7:40.36	23
19	Yahor Damaratski	Individual Neutral Athletes		7:40.55	22
20	Shomu Sasaki	Japan		7:40.62	21
21	Jake Weidemann	Canada		7:55.10	20
22	Gabriel Odor	Austria		7:58.14	19
23	Jordan Stolz	United States		8:23.24	18
24	Sigurd Holbø Dyrset	Norway		5:26.13	17

==== Team sprint ====
The race started on 7 December 2025 at 16:37.

Rank	Pair	Lane	Country	Time	Diff	WC Points
1st place, gold medalist(s)	7	c	Netherlands; Stefan Westenbroek; Jenning de Boo; Tim Prins	1:17.22		60
2nd place, silver medalist(s)	6	c	United States; Zach Stoppelmoor; Cooper McLeod; Conor McDermott-Mostowy	1:18.16	+0.94	54
3rd place, bronze medalist(s)	4	s	Norway; Siver Brattgjerd; Henrik Fagerli Rukke; Bjørn Magnussen	1:19.02	+1.80	48
4	5	c	Poland; Kacper Abratkiewicz; Marek Kania; Szymon Wojtakowski	1:20.03	+2.81	43
5	6	s	South Korea; Koo Kyung-min; Cho Sang-heok; Oh Hyun-min	1:20.41	+3.19	40
6	1	s	Switzerland; Oliver Grob; Flavio Gross; Livio Wenger	1:21.65	+4.43	38
7	7	s	China; Li Tianlong; Deng Zhihan; Li Wenhao	1:21.79	+4.57	36
8	3	c	Kazakhstan; Nikita Vazhenin; Aleksandr Klenko; Nuraly Akzhol	1:22.21	+4.99	34
9	3	s	Hungary; Botond Bejczi; Bálint Bödei; Konrád Nagy	1:22.41	+5.19	32
10	2	c	Finland; Max Kokko; Tuukka Suomalainen; Juuso Lehtonen	1:24.17	+6.95	31
11	5	s	Canada; Christopher Fiola; Anders Johnson; David La Rue	DNF		30
	2	s	Austria; Ignaz Gschwentner; Gabriel Odor; Alexander Farthofer	DNS		0

=== Women's events ===
==== 500 m ====
The race started on 7 December 2025 at 14:15.

Rank	Pair	Lane	Name	Country	Time	Diff	WC Points
1st place, gold medalist(s)	10	o	Femke Kok	Netherlands	37.00		60
2nd place, silver medalist(s)	10	i	Jutta Leerdam	Netherlands	37.36	+0.36	54
3rd place, bronze medalist(s)	9	o	Marrit Fledderus	Netherlands	37.53	+0.53	48
4	7	i	Yukino Yoshida	Japan	37.63	+0.63	43
5	5	i	Serena Pergher	Italy	37.64	+0.64	40
6	6	o	Angel Daleman	Netherlands	37.68	+0.68	38
7	2	i	Kim Min-sun	South Korea	37.83	+0.83	36
8	2	o	Kaja Ziomek-Nogal	Poland	37.84	+0.84	34
9	3	i	Sophie Warmuth	Germany	37.93	+0.93	32
10	9	i	Anna Boersma	Netherlands	37.93	+0.93	31
11	4	o	Kristina Silaeva	Kazakhstan	37.94	+0.94	30
11	6	i	Béatrice Lamarche	Canada	37.94	+0.94	30
13	3	o	Tian Ruining	China	37.99	+0.99	28
14	7	o	Chen Ying-chu	Chinese Taipei	38.00	+1.00	27
15	8	o	Lee Na-hyun	South Korea	38.02	+1.02	26
16	4	i	Andżelika Wójcik	Poland	38.14	+1.14	25
17	5	o	Martyna Baran	Poland	38.19	+1.19	24
18	1	i	Rio Yamada	Japan	38.49	+1.49	23
19	1	o	Brooklyn McDougall	Canada	38.57	+1.57	22
20	8	i	Erin Jackson	United States	DNF		21

==== 1000 m ====
The race started on 5 December 2025 at 20:57.

Rank	Pair	Lane	Name	Country	Time	Diff	WC Points
1st place, gold medalist(s)	10	o	Jutta Leerdam	Netherlands	1:14.17		60
2nd place, silver medalist(s)	1	i	Miho Takagi	Japan	1:14.29	+0.12	54
3rd place, bronze medalist(s)	9	i	Femke Kok	Netherlands	1:14.46	+0.29	48
4	10	i	Brittany Bowe	United States	1:14.55	+0.38	43
5	7	o	Antoinette Rijpma-de Jong	Netherlands	1:14.84	+0.67	40
6	8	i	Béatrice Lamarche	Canada	1:15.13	+0.67	38
7	7	i	Rio Yamada	Japan	1:15.21	+1.04	36
8	5	i	Lee Na-hyun	South Korea	1:15.28	+1.11	34
9	6	i	Yukino Yoshida	Japan	1:15.34	+1.17	32
10	4	i	Ellia Smeding	United Kingdom	1:15.42	+1.25	31
11	8	o	Marrit Fledderus	Netherlands	1:15.59	+1.42	30
12	3	i	Kim Min-sun	South Korea	1:15.87	+1.70	29
13	6	o	Yin Qi	China	1:15.89	+1.72	28
14	2	o	Sofia Thorup	Denmark	1:15.98	+1.81	27
15	2	i	Elizaveta Golubeva	Kazakhstan	1:16.29	+2.12	26
16	9	o	Isabel Grevelt	Netherlands	1:16.53	+2.36	25
17	3	o	Alexa Scott	Canada	1:16.83	+2.66	24
18	1	o	Vanessa Herzog	Austria	1:17.20	+3.03	23
19	4	o	Karolina Bosiek	Poland	1:17.23	+3.06	22
20	5	o	Erin Jackson	United States	DNF		21

==== 1500 m ====
The race started on 6 December 2025 at 16:21.

Rank	Pair	Lane	Name	Country	Time	Diff	WC Points
1st place, gold medalist(s)	9	o	Joy Beune	Netherlands	1:53.10		60
2nd place, silver medalist(s)	8	o	Antoinette Rijpma-de Jong	Netherlands	1:53.36	+0.26	54
3rd place, bronze medalist(s)	6	o	Ivanie Blondin	Canada	1:53.43	+0.33	48
4	8	i	Brittany Bowe	United States	1:53.80	+0.70	43
5	9	i	Miho Takagi	Japan	1:53.89	+0.79	40
6	6	i	Angel Daleman	Netherlands	1:53.98	+0.88	38
7	4	o	Nadezhda Morozova	Kazakhstan	1:54.05	+0.95	36
8	10	o	Ragne Wiklund	Norway	1:54.11	+1.01	34
9	7	i	Nikola Zdráhalová	Czech Republic	1:54.27	+1.17	32
10	7	o	Han Mei	China	1:54.32	+1.22	31
11	2	o	Marijke Groenewoud	Netherlands	1:54.55	+1.45	30
12	5	o	Kaitlyn McGregor	Switzerland	1:55.13	+2.03	29
13	10	i	Melissa Wijfje	Netherlands	1:55.17	+2.07	28
14	1	o	Yang Binyu	China	1:55.36	+2.26	27
15	4	i	Isabelle van Elst	Belgium	1:55.50	+2.40	26
16	1	i	Valérie Maltais	Canada	1:55.76	+2.66	25
17	3	i	Francesca Lollobrigida	Italy	1:56.44	+3.34	24
18	3	o	Elizaveta Golubeva	Kazakhstan	1:56.47	+3.37	23
19	5	i	Ayano Sato	Japan	1:56.58	+3.48	22
20	2	i	Greta Myers	United States	1:57.33	+4.23	21

==== 5000 m ====
The race started on 5 December 2025 at 18:55.

Rank	Pair	Lane	Name	Country	Time	Diff	WC Points
1st place, gold medalist(s)	5	o	Ragne Wiklund	Norway	6:49.01		60
2nd place, silver medalist(s)	5	i	Isabelle Weidemann	Canada	6:50.11	+1.10	54
3rd place, bronze medalist(s)	6	i	Joy Beune	Netherlands	6:51.83	+2.82	48
4	3	o	Sandrine Tas	Belgium	6:52.24; PB	+3.23	43
5	1	o	Merel Conijn	Netherlands	6:53.31	+4.30	40
6	3	i	Martina Sáblíková	Czech Republic	6:55.96	+6.95	38
7	4	o	Francesca Lollobrigida	Italy	6:56.80	+7.79	36
8	2	o	Bente Kerkhoff	Netherlands	6:57.17	+8.16	34
9	1	i	Josie Hoffmann	Germany	7:00.64	+11.63	32
10	2	i	Ivanie Blondin	Canada	7:01.76	+12.75	31
11	4	i	Nadezhda Morozova	Kazakhstan	7:02.79; PB	+13.78	30
12	6	o	Valérie Maltais	Canada	7:06.69	+17.68	29

==== Mass start ====
The race started on 7 December 2025 at 15:30.

Rank	Name	Country	Points	Time	WC Points
1st place, gold medalist(s)	Marijke Groenewoud	Netherlands	63	8:07.66	60
2nd place, silver medalist(s)	Mia Manganello	United States	40	8:07.92	54
3rd place, bronze medalist(s)	Park Ji-woo	South Korea	20	8:08.28	48
4	Ivanie Blondin	Canada	10	8:08.30	43
5	Hou Jundan	China	6	8:08.68	40
6	Ayano Sato	Japan	6	8:08.69	38
7	Kaitlyn McGregor	Switzerland	3	8:15.18	36
8	Sandrine Tas	Belgium	3	8:36.07	34
9	Jeannine Rosner	Austria	2	8:13.63	32
10	Anastasiia Semenova	Individual Neutral Athletes	2	8:25.44	31
11	Valerie Maltais	Canada	1	8:13.32	30
12	Ramona Härdi	Switzerland	1	8:15.29	29
13	Francesca Lollobrigida	Italy		8:08.80	28
14	Yang Binyu	China		8:08.80	27
15	Fran Vanhoutte	Belgium		8:09.65	26
16	Lim Lee-won	South Korea		8:09.83	25
17	Greta Myers	United States		8:10.23	24
18	Aurora Grinden Løvås	Norway		8:10.39	23
19	Bente Kerkhoff	Netherlands		8:11.52	22
20	Momoka Horikawa	Japan		8:12.85	21
21	Josephine Schlörb	Germany		8:31.68	20
22	Jéssica Carolina Santos Rodrigues	Portugal		6:44.34	19
23	Josie Hofmann	Germany		4:11.52	18

==== Team sprint ====
The race started on 7 December 2025 at 16:23.

Rank	Pair	Lane	Country	Time	Diff	WC Points
1st place, gold medalist(s)	4	s	Netherlands; Anna Boersma; Marrit Fledderus; Femke Kok	1:25.18		60
2nd place, silver medalist(s)	3	c	Canada; Brooklyn McDougall; Béatrice Lamarche; Ivanie Blondin	1:26.05	+0.87	54
3rd place, bronze medalist(s)	4	c	Poland; Martyna Baran; Kaja Ziomek-Nogal; Karolina Bosiek	1:26.65	+1.47	48
4	2	s	United States; McKenzie Browne; Sarah Warren; Chrysta Rands-Evans	1:29.82	+4.64	43
	1	s	South Korea; Jung Hui-dan; Kim Min-sun; Lee Na-hyun	DQ		0

== Division B result summary ==
=== Men's events ===
Event	First place	Time	Second place	Time	Third place	Time	Report
500 m	Yuta Hirose; Japan	34.56	Liu Ze; China	34.83	Merijn Scheperkamp; Netherlands	34.89	
1000 m	Szymon Wojtakowski; Poland	1:08.67	Gabriel Odor; Austria	1:08.76	Zach Stoppelmoor; United States	1:08.99	
1500 m	Vladimir Semirunniy; Poland	1:45.71	Metoděj Jílek; Czech Republic	1:45.84	Ryota Kojima; Japan	1:45.87	
10000 m	Vladimir Semirunniy; Poland	12:28.05; TR; PB	Bart Swings; Belgium	12:44.75; PB	Riccardo Lorello; Italy	12:46.93; PB	
Mass start^{A}	Yahor Damaratski; Individual Neutral Athletes	63	Mathieu Belloir; France	40	Sigurd Holbø Dyrset; Norway	20	

^{A} In mass start, race points are accumulated during the race based on results of the intermediate sprints and the final sprint. The skater with most race points is the winner.

=== Women's events ===
Event	First place	Time	Second place	Time	Third place	Time	Report
500 m	Miho Takagi; Japan	38.02	Nikola Zdráhalová; Czech Republic	38.34	Wang Jingziqian; China	38.38	
1000 m	Han Mei; China	1:15.50	Nikola Zdráhalová; Czech Republic	1:15.63	Nadezhda Morozova; Kazakhstan	1:16.03	
1500 m	Natalia Czerwonka; Poland	1:56.35	Alexandra Sayutina; Individual Neutral Athletes	1:56.40; PB	Zofia Braun; Poland	1:56.61; PB	
5000 m	Sanne in 't Hof; Netherlands	6:47.65	Marijke Groenewoud; Netherlands	6:50.24	Maira Jasch; Germany	6:53.14; PB	
Mass start^{A}	Jeannine Rosner; Austria	62	Jéssica Carolina Santos Rodrigues; Portugal	43	Elizaveta Golubeva; Kazakhstan	22	

^{A} In mass start, race points are accumulated during the race based on results of the intermediate sprints and the final sprint. The skater with most race points is the winner.
