= 2026 World Junior Speed Skating Championships =

International speed skating competition

2026 ISU Speed Skating Junior World Championships
- Venue: Max Aicher Arena, Inzell, Germany
- Dates: 27 February – 1 March

Medalist men
1st place, gold medalist(s)		Finn Sonnekalb	Germany
2nd place, silver medalist(s)		Thijs Wiersma	Netherlands
3rd place, bronze medalist(s)		Eirik Andersen	Norway

Medalist women
1st place, gold medalist(s)		Kristina Shumekova	Kazakhstan
2nd place, silver medalist(s)		Jeannine Rosner	Austria
3rd place, bronze medalist(s)		Jasmijn Veenhuis	Netherlands

The 2026 World Junior Speed Skating Championships took place from 27 February to 1 March 2026 at the Max Aicher Arena in Inzell, Germany.

== Schedule ==
All times are local (UTC+1).

Date	Time	Events
27 February	10:00	500 m women 500 m men 1500 m women 1500 m men Mass start semifinals women Mass start semifinals men
28 February	09:00	1000 m women 1000 m men 3000 m women 5000 m men
1 March	09:00	Team pursuit women Team pursuit men Team sprint women Team sprint men Mass start final women Mass start final men Mixed relay

== Medal summary ==
=== Medal table ===
* Host nation (Germany)

Rank	Nation	Gold	Silver	Bronze	Total
1	Kazakhstan	6	1	0	7
2	Germany*	5	0	2	7
3	China	2	2	2	6
4	Netherlands	1	3	3	7
5	Japan	1	2	3	6
6	Austria	1	2	1	4
6	Poland	1	2	1	4
8	Norway	0	4	1	5
9	Canada	0	1	1	2
10	South Korea	0	0	3	3
Totals (10 entries)		17	17	17	51

=== Men's events ===
Event	Gold		Silver		Bronze	
500 m	Finn Sonnekalb; Germany	35.13	Miika Johan Klevstuen; Norway	35.55	Zhou Tianyu; China	35.59
1000 m	Finn Sonnekalb; Germany	1:08.35	Miika Johan Klevstuen; Norway	1:09.90	Kim Jun-ha; South Korea	1:09.98
1500 m	Finn Sonnekalb; Germany	1:44.86	Taiga Sasaki; Japan	1:46.01	Thijs Wiersma; Netherlands	1:46.36
5000 m	Liu Hanbin; China	6:14.38	Thijs Wiersma; Netherlands	6:17.63	Taiga Sasaki; Japan	6:18.51
Mass start	Vadim Chebardakov; Kazakhstan	34 pts	Kirill Pishchala; Poland	24 pts	Yuta Fuchigami; Japan	10 pts
Team pursuit	Japan; Taiga Sasaki; Taiki Shingai; Yuta Fuchigami	3:43.04; WRJ	Netherlands; Sem Spruit; Ede Kortlever; Thijs Wiersma	3:47.33	Germany; Finn Sonnekalb; Maximillian Patz; Jaro Falig	3:49.46
Team sprint	Germany; Levente Engst; Ben-Luca Kleinke; Finn Sonnekalb	1:20.86	Norway; Bendik Becker Pedersen; Eirik Andersen; Miika Johan Klevstuen	1:21.06	South Korea; Shin Seon-ung; Han Man-hyeok; Kim Jun-ha	1:21.16
Overall classification	Finn Sonnekalb; Germany	143.706	Thijs Wiersma; Netherlands	146.136	Eirik Andersen; Norway	146.686

=== Women's events ===
Event	Gold		Silver		Bronze	
500 m	Kristina Shumekova; Kazakhstan	38.48	Julia Snelgrove; Canada	38.78	Wiktoria Dąbrowska; Poland	38.96
1000 m	Kristina Shumekova; Kazakhstan	1:16.34	Ayano Sekiguchi; Japan	1:16.66	Jeannine Rosner; Austria	1:17.00
1500 m	Kristina Shumekova; Kazakhstan	1:56.06	Jeannine Rosner; Austria	1:56.36	Ayano Sekiguchi; Japan	1:57.97
3000 m	Jeannine Rosner; Austria	4:02.39	Kristina Shumekova; Kazakhstan	4:03.99	Tai Zhien; China	4:04.08
Mass start	Hanna Mazur; Poland	30 pts	Tai Zhien; China	20 pts	Julia Snelgrove; Canada	10 pts
Team pursuit	Netherlands; Jasmijn Veenhuis; Mette ten Cate; Sophie Exterkate	3:04.89	China; Tai Zhien; Wang Yuxuan; Liu Yunqi	3:05.61	Germany; Neele Göpelt; Alexandra Sauer; Mia Meinig	3:06.98
Team sprint	Kazakhstan; Varvara Glukhova; Anastasija Belovodova; Kristina Shumekova	1:28.77	Poland; Nadia Machała; Wiktoria Dąbrowska; Hanna Mazur	1:28.94	Netherlands; Marika de Glee; Naomi Kammeraat; Mette ten Cate	1:29.71
Overall classification	Kristina Shumekova; Kazakhstan	156.001	Jeannine Rosner; Austria	157.364	Jasmijn Veenhuis; Netherlands	160.928

=== Mixed event ===
Event	Gold		Silver		Bronze	
Relay	China; Liu Yunqi; Pan Baoshuo	3:00.56; WRJ	Norway; Martine Solem; Miika Johan Klevstuen	3:01.33	South Korea; Heo Ji-an; Kim Jun-ha	3:01.35
