= Michael Spielmann =

German speed skater

Personal information
- Nationality: German
- Born: 23 January 1970 (age 55); Berlin, Germany

Sport
- Sport: Speed skating

Michael Spielmann (born 23 January 1970) is a German speed skater. He competed in three events at the 1994 Winter Olympics.
