= Jeannine Rosner =

Austrian speed skater (born 2006)

Personal information
- Nationality: Austrian
- Born: 8 October 2006 (age 19) Innsbruck, Austria

Sport
- Country: Austria
- Sport: Speed skating
- Event: allround
Medal record
Women's speed skating
Representing the Austria
World Junior Championships
Gold medal – first place	2025 Collalbo	1000m
Gold medal – first place	2025 Collalbo	1500m
Gold medal – first place	2025 Collalbo	3000m
Gold medal – first place	2025 Collalbo	Overall
Gold medal – first place	2026 Inzell	3000m
Silver medal – second place	2026 Inzell	Overall
Silver medal – second place	2026 Inzell	1500m
Bronze medal – third place	2026 Inzell	1000m

Jeannine Rosner (born 8 October 2006) is an Austrian speed skater. She is 2025 Junior World Champion. Rosner represented Austria at the 2026 Winter Olympics.

== Career ==
Rosner was the flag bearer for Austria at the 2024 Winter Youth Olympics.

Rosner won three gold medals and the overall classification of the 2025 World Junior Speed Skating Championships. At the 2025 World Cup 2 in Calgary she set a new Junior World Record at the 3000 meter. Rosner represented Austria at the 2026 Winter Olympics, with an 8th place at the mass start as best result.
