= 2025–26 ISU Speed Skating World Cup – World Cup 2 =

Ice skating competition in Calgary, Canada

2025–26 ISU Speed Skating World Cup 2
- Venue: Olympic Oval; Calgary; Canada
- Dates: 21 — 23 November 2025

The second competition weekend of the 2025–26 ISU Speed Skating World Cup was held at the Olympic Oval in Calgary, Canada, from Friday, 21 November, until Sunday, 23 November 2025. It is the second of four events that determine qualification for speed skating at the 2026 Winter Olympics.

== Medal summary ==
=== Men's events ===
Event	Gold	Time	Silver	Time	Bronze	Time	Report
500 m (1)	Kim Jun-ho; South Korea	33.99	Jenning de Boo; Netherlands	34.02	Jordan Stolz; United States	34.02	
500 m (2)	Jordan Stolz; United States	33.79	Damian Żurek; Poland	33.85; PB	Kim Jun-ho; South Korea	33.99	
1000 m	Jordan Stolz; United States	1:06.00	Jenning de Boo; Netherlands	1:06.11	Joep Wennemars; Netherlands	1:06.44; PB	
1500 m	Jordan Stolz; United States	1:42.10	Finn Sonnekalb; Germany	1:42.31	Kjeld Nuis; Netherlands	1:42.42	
5000 m	Casey Dawson; United States	6:01.84; TR; PB	Sander Eitrem; Norway	6:01.86; PB	Ted-Jan Bloemen; Canada	6:02.26	
Mass start^{A}	Andrea Giovannini; Italy	61	Chung Jae-won; South Korea	40	Jordan Stolz; United States	20	
Team pursuit	United States; Ethan Cepuran; Casey Dawson; Emery Lehman	3:35.34	France; Timothy Loubineaud; Valentin Thiebault; Germain Deschamps	3:38.05	Netherlands; Marcel Bosker; Chris Huizinga; Beau Snellink	3:38.65	

^{A} In mass start, race points are accumulated during the race based on results of the intermediate sprints and the final sprint. The skater with most race points is the winner.

=== Women's events ===
Event	Gold	Time	Silver	Time	Bronze	Time	Report
500 m (1)	Femke Kok; Netherlands	36.65	Chen Ying-chu; Chinese Taipei	37.14; PB	Erin Jackson; United States	37.15	
500 m (2)	Femke Kok; Netherlands	36.72	Jutta Leerdam; Netherlands	37.01; PB	Marrit Fledderus; Netherlands	37.08; PB	
1000 m	Femke Kok; Netherlands	1:12.36; PB	Isabel Grevelt; Netherlands	1:13.14; PB	Marrit Fledderus; Netherlands	1:13.33	
1500 m	Joy Beune; Netherlands	1:51.17	Miho Takagi; Japan	1:51.68	Brittany Bowe; United States	1:51.84	
3000 m	Joy Beune; Netherlands	3:54.42	Ragne Wiklund; Norway	3:55.25	Valerie Maltais; Canada	3:56.45; PB	
Mass start^{A}	Ivanie Blondin; Canada	61	Marijke Groenewoud; Netherlands	40	Mia Manganello; United States	20	
Team pursuit	Netherlands; Joy Beune; Antoinette Rijpma-de Jong; Marijke Groenewoud	2:52.52	Canada; Valerie Maltais; Ivanie Blondin; Isabelle Weidemann	2:52.68	Japan; Miho Takagi; Ayano Sato; Hana Noake	2:53.08	

^{A} In mass start, race points are accumulated during the race based on results of the intermediate sprints and the final sprint. The skater with most race points is the winner.

=== Mixed events ===
Event	Gold	Time	Silver	Time	Bronze	Time	Report
Mixed gender relay	Netherlands; Wesley Dijs; Chloe Hoogendoorn	2:54.05; WR; TR	Germany; Stefan Emele; Anna Ostlender	2:54.41	Hungary; Bálint Bödei; Abigél Mercs	2:55.43	

== Medal count ==
* Host nation (Canada)

Rank	Nation	Gold	Silver	Bronze	Total
1	Netherlands	7	5	5	17
2	United States	5	0	5	10
3	Canada*	1	1	2	4
4	South Korea	1	1	1	3
5	Italy	1	0	0	1
6	Germany	0	2	0	2
6	Norway	0	2	0	2
8	Japan	0	1	1	2
9	Chinese Taipei	0	1	0	1
9	France	0	1	0	1
9	Poland	0	1	0	1
12	Hungary	0	0	1	1
Totals (12 entries)		15	15	15	45

== Results ==
=== Men's events ===
==== 1st 500 m ====
The race started on 22 November 2025 at 12:58.

Rank	Pair	Lane	Name	Country	Time	Diff	WC Points
1st place, gold medalist(s)	7	i	Kim Jun-ho	South Korea	33.99		60
2nd place, silver medalist(s)	10	i	Jenning de Boo	Netherlands	34.02	+0.03	54
3rd place, bronze medalist(s)	9	i	Jordan Stolz	United States	34.02	+0.03	48
4	8	i	Damian Żurek	Poland	34.07	+0.08	43
5	2	o	Sebas Diniz	Netherlands	34.11; PB	+0.12	40
7	10	o	Wataru Morishige	Japan	34.15	+0.16	38
6	6	i	Xue Zhiwen	China	34.16	+0.17	36
8	5	o	Marek Kania	Poland	34.16	+0.17	34
9	6	o	Cooper McLeod	United States	34.23	+0.24	32
10	5	i	Laurent Dubreuil	Canada	34.29	+0.30	31
11	8	o	Gao Tingyu	China	34.31	+0.32	30
12	2	i	Yuta Hirose	Japan	34.34	+0.35	29
13	4	o	Marten Liiv	Estonia	34.50	+0.51	28
14	1	o	Christopher Fiola	Canada	34.53	+0.54	27
15	3	i	Joep Wennemars	Netherlands	34.55	+0.56	26
16	4	i	Cedrick Brunet	Canada	34.63	+0.64	25
17	9	o	Yevgeniy Koshkin	Kazakhstan	34.65	+0.66	24
18	1	i	Yuma Murakami	Japan	34.70	+0.71	23
19	7	o	Bjørn Magnussen	Norway	54.01	+20.02	22
20	3	o	Tatsuya Shinhama	Japan	1:00.83	+26.84	21

==== 2nd 500 m ====
The race started on 23 November 2025 at 14:36.

Rank	Pair	Lane	Name	Country	Time	Diff	WC Points
1st place, gold medalist(s)	8	o	Jordan Stolz	United States	33.79		60
2nd place, silver medalist(s)	10	i	Damian Żurek	Poland	33.85; PB	+0.06	54
3rd place, bronze medalist(s)	8	i	Kim Jun-ho	South Korea	33.99	+0.20	48
4	10	o	Wataru Morishige	Japan	34.00	+0.21	43
5	9	o	Jenning de Boo	Netherlands	34.07	+0.28	40
6	1	o	Katsuhiro Kuratsubo	Japan	34.13; PB	+0.34	38
7	4	o	Marten Liiv	Estonia	34.17	+0.38	36
8	2	o	Lian Ziwen	China	34.17	+0.38	34
9	5	o	Marek Kania	Poland	34.18	+0.39	32
10	9	i	Gao Tingyu	China	34.18	+0.39	31
11	6	o	Laurent Dubreuil	Canada	34.19	+0.40	30
12	6	i	Cooper Mcleod	United States	34.27	+0.48	29
13	2	i	Joep Wennemars	Netherlands	34.32; PB	+0.53	28
14	4	i	Sebas Diniz	Netherlands	34.39	+0.60	27
15	5	i	Bjørn Magnussen	Norway	34.39	+0.60	26
16	1	i	Nil Llop Izquierdo	Spain	34.46	+0.67	25
17	3	i	Cedrick Brunet	Canada	34.47	+0.68	24
18	7	i	Xue Zhiwen	China	34.48	+0.69	23
19	3	o	Yuta Hirose	Japan	34.53	+0.74	22
20	7	o	Yevgeniy Koshkin	Kazakhstan	34.54	+0.75	21

==== 1000 m ====
The race started on 21 November 2025 at 17:33.

Rank	Pair	Lane	Name	Country	Time	Diff	WC Points
1st place, gold medalist(s)	8	o	Jordan Stolz	United States	1:06.00		60
2nd place, silver medalist(s)	8	i	Jenning de Boo	Netherlands	1:06.11	+0.11	54
3rd place, bronze medalist(s)	6	i	Joep Wennemars	Netherlands	1:06.44; PB	+0.44	48
4	6	o	Cooper Mcleod	United States	1:06.62; PB	+0.62	43
5	4	i	Lian Ziwen	China	1:06.73; PB	+0.73	40
6	9	i	Damian Żurek	Poland	1:06.90	+0.90	38
7	10	o	Tim Prins	Netherlands	1:07.18	+1.18	36
8	7	i	Marten Liiv	Estonia	1:07.22	+1.22	34
9	7	o	Ryota Kojima	Japan	1:07.37	+1.37	32
10	4	o	Taiyo Nonomura	Japan	1:07.43	+1.43	31
11	5	o	Marek Kania	Poland	1:07.51	+1.51	30
12	5	i	Conor McDermott-Mostowy	United States	1:07.63	+1.63	29
13	2	o	Hendrik Dombek	Germany	1:07.64	+1.64	28
14	9	o	Finn Sonnekalb	Germany	1:07.68	+1.68	27
15	10	i	Ning Zhongyan	China	1:07.77	+1.77	26
16	3	o	Moritz Klein	Germany	1:07.83	+1.83	25
17	2	i	Mathias Vosté	Belgium	1:07.96	+1.96	24
18	1	i	Kim Min-seok	Hungary	1:08.18	+2.18	23
19	1	o	Oh Hyun-min	South Korea	1:08.19	+2.19	22
20	3	i	Laurent Dubreuil	Canada	1:08.74	+2.74	21

==== 1500 m ====
The race started on 22 November 2025 at 14:17.

Rank	Pair	Lane	Name	Country	Time	Diff	WC Points
1st place, gold medalist(s)	9	o	Jordan Stolz	United States	1:42.10		60
2nd place, silver medalist(s)	9	i	Finn Sonnekalb	Germany	1:42.31	+0.21	54
3rd place, bronze medalist(s)	8	i	Kjeld Nuis	Netherlands	1:42.42	+0.32	48
4	7	i	Joep Wennemars	Netherlands	1:42.54	+0.44	43
5	7	o	Tim Prins	Netherlands	1:42.56	+0.46	40
6	10	o	Ning Zhongyan	China	1:42.80	+0.70	38
7	1	o	Gabriel Odor	Austria	1:43.18	+1.08	36
8	3	o	Tijmen Snel	Netherlands	1:43.40	+1.30	34
9	3	i	Wesly Dijs	Netherlands	1:43.56	+1.46	32
10	4	o	Liu Hanbin	China	1:43.57	+1.47	31
11	6	o	Daniele Di Stefano	Italy	1:43.76	+1.66	30
12	5	o	Taiyo Nonomura	Japan	1:43.76	+1.66	29
13	2	i	Sander Eitrem	Norway	1:43.80	+1.70	28
14	2	o	Antoine Gélinas-Beaulieu	Canada	1:43.92	+1.82	27
15	8	o	Kazuya Yamada	Japan	1:43.96	+1.86	26
16	10	i	Peder Kongshaug	Norway	1:43.96	+1.86	25
17	5	i	Didrik Eng Strand	Norway	1:44.10	+2.00	24
18	4	i	David La Rue	Canada	1:44.29	+2.19	23
19	1	i	Motonaga Arito	Japan	1:44.76	+2.66	22
20	6	i	Kim Min-seok	Hungary	1:45.29	+3.19	21

==== 5000 m ====
The race started on 21 November 2025 at 19:16.

Rank	Pair	Lane	Name	Country	Time	Diff	WC Points
1st place, gold medalist(s)	8	o	Casey Dawson	United States	6:01.84; TR; PB		60
2nd place, silver medalist(s)	7	o	Sander Eitrem	Norway	6:01.86; PB	+0.02	54
3rd place, bronze medalist(s)	5	i	Ted-Jan Bloemen	Canada	6:02.26	+0.42	48
4	7	i	Timothy Loubineaud	France	6:02.47	+0.63	43
5	6	o	Chris Huizinga	Netherlands	6:05.16; PB	+3.32	40
6	8	i	Davide Ghiotto	Italy	6:05.79	+3.95	38
7	6	i	Metoděj Jílek	Czech Republic	6:08.06	+6.22	36
8	4	o	Michele Malfatti	Italy	6:08.13; PB	+6.29	34
9	3	o	Felix Maly	Germany	6:08.57; PB	+6.73	32
10	3	i	Fridtjof Petzold	Germany	6:08.75; PB	+6.91	31
11	4	i	Alexander Farthofer	Austria	6:09.33	+7.49	30
12	5	o	Jorrit Bergsma	Netherlands	6:10.11	+8.27	29
13	1	o	Gabriel Groß	Germany	6:10.31	+8.47	28
14	1	i	Bart Swings	Belgium	6:10.81	+8.97	27
15	2	i	Sigurd Henriksen	Norway	6:15.59	+13.75	26
16	2	o	Peder Kongshaug	Norway	6:16.77	+14.93	25

==== Mass start ====
The race started on 23 November 2025 at 15:38.

Rank	Name	Country	Points	Time	WC Points
1st place, gold medalist(s)	Andrea Giovannini	Italy	61	7:42.51	60
2nd place, silver medalist(s)	Chung Jae-won	South Korea	40	7:42.74	54
3rd place, bronze medalist(s)	Jordan Stolz	United States	20	7:42.83	48
4	Bart Swings	Belgium	12	7:42.86	43
5	Gabriel Odor	Austria	8	7:42.97	40
6	Metoděj Jílek	Czech Republic	5	8:00.22	38
7	Bart Hoolwerf	Netherlands	3	7:42.97	36
8	Jorrit Bergsma	Netherlands	3	7:52.08	34
9	Didrik Eng Strand	Norway	3	8:24.80	32
10	Ethan Cepuran	United States	2	7:55.54	31
11	Livio Wenger	Switzerland	1	7:57.71	30
12	Indra Medard	Belgium	1	8:07.64	29
13	Daniele Di Stefano	Italy		7:42.99	28
14	Timothy Loubineaud	France		7:43.61	27
15	Shomu Sasaki	Japan		7:43.64	26
16	Li Yuhaochen	China		7:43.86	25
17	Antoine Gélinas-Beaulieu	Canada		7:43.86	24
18	Zhou Zihan	China		7:44.04	23
19	Felix Maly	Germany		7:44.31	22
20	Jake Weidemann	Canada		7:44.48	21
21	Viktor Hald Thorup	Denmark		7:46.58	20
22	Cho Seung-min	South Korea		7:46.83	19
23	Fridtjof Petzold	Germany		7:56.20	18
24	Alexander Farthofer	Austria		8:37.10	17

==== Team pursuit ====
The race started on 23 November 2025 at 13:27.

Rank	Pair	Lane	Country	Time	Diff	WC Points
1st place, gold medalist(s)	4	s	United States; Ethan Cepuran; Casey Dawson; Emery Lehman	3:35.34		60
2nd place, silver medalist(s)	3	s	France; Timothy Loubineaud; Valentin Thiebault; Germain Deschamps	3:38.05	+2.71	54
3rd place, bronze medalist(s)	1	s	Netherlands; Marcel Bosker; Chris Huizinga; Beau Snellink	3:38.65	+3.31	48
4	2	c	Germany; Patrick Beckert; Felix Maly; Fridjof Petzold	3:39.83	+4.49	43
5	2	s	Japan; Shomu Sasaki; Kazuya Yamada; Motonaga Arito	3:41.43	+6.09	40
6	3	c	China; Ning Zhongyan; Wu Yu; Liu Hanbin	3:42.24	+6.90	38
7	1	c	Poland; Szymon Palka; Marcin Bachanek; Vladimir Semirunniy	3:42.69	+7.35	36
8	4	c	Norway; Sander Eitrem; Sigurd Henriksen; Peder Kongshaug	4:03.16	+27.82	34

=== Women's events ===
==== 1st 500 m ====
The race started on 22 November 2025 at 12:29.

Rank	Pair	Lane	Name	Country	Time	Diff	WC Points
1st place, gold medalist(s)	10	o	Femke Kok	Netherlands	36.65		60
2nd place, silver medalist(s)	4	i	Chen Ying-chu	Chinese Taipei	37.14; PB	+0.49	54
3rd place, bronze medalist(s)	9	i	Erin Jackson	United States	37.15	+0.50	48
4	10	i	Marrit Fledderus	Netherlands	37.18	+0.53	43
5	7	i	Jutta Leerdam	Netherlands	37.26	+0.61	40
6	8	o	Lee Na-hyun	South Korea	37.33	+0.68	38
7	5	o	Serena Pergher	Italy	37.34	+0.69	36
8	3	i	Kristina Silaeva	Kazakhstan	37.38	+0.73	34
9	8	i	Anna Boersma	Netherlands	37.41	+0.76	32
10	2	i	Sophie Warmuth	Germany	37.43	+0.78	31
11	5	i	Martyna Baran	Poland	37.49	+0.84	30
12	6	i	Andżelika Wójcik	Poland	37.54	+0.89	29
13	4	o	Angel Daleman	Netherlands	37.56	+0.91	28
14	6	o	Béatrice Lamarche	Canada	37.57	+0.92	27
15	2	o	Kurumi Inagawa	Japan	37.57	+0.92	26
16	3	o	Tian Ruining	China	37.67	+1.02	25
17	1	o	Carolina Hiller-Donnelly	Canada	37.92	+1.27	24
18	1	i	Rio Yamada	Japan	38.08	+1.43	23
19	9	o	Yukino Yoshida	Japan	1:03.79	+27.14	22
	7	o	Kaja Ziomek-Nogal	Poland	DQ		0

==== 2nd 500 m ====
The race started on 23 November 2025 at 14:05.

Rank	Pair	Lane	Name	Country	Time	Diff	WC Points
1st place, gold medalist(s)	9	i	Femke Kok	Netherlands	36.72		60
2nd place, silver medalist(s)	7	i	Jutta Leerdam	Netherlands	37.01; PB	+0.29	54
3rd place, bronze medalist(s)	10	o	Marrit Fledderus	Netherlands	37.08; PB	+0.36	48
4	7	o	Anna Boersma	Netherlands	37.21	+0.49	43
5	3	i	Angel Daleman	Netherlands	37.28; JWR; PB	+0.56	40
6	10	i	Lee Na-hyun	South Korea	37.29	+0.57	38
7	8	i	Erin Jackson	United States	37.35	+0.63	36
8	5	o	Béatrice Lamarche	Canada	37.39	+0.67	34
9	5	i	Martyna Baran	Poland	37.39	+0.67	32
10	9	o	Yukino Yoshida	Japan	37.44	+0.72	31
11	8	o	Chen Ying-chu	Chinese Taipei	37.46	+0.74	30
12	6	i	Serena Pergher	Italy	37.50	+0.78	29
13	2	i	Kim Min-sun	South Korea	37.51	+0.79	28
14	3	o	Tian Ruining	China	37.52	+0.80	27
15	4	o	Sophie Warmuth	Germany	37.55	+0.83	26
16	6	o	Andżelika Wójcik	Poland	37.60	+0.88	25
17	4	i	Kristina Silaeva	Kazakhstan	37.61	+0.89	24
18	2	o	Vanessa Herzog	Austria	37.90	+1.18	23
19	1	i	Nadezhda Morozova	Kazakhstan	38.04	+1.32	22
20	1	o	Sofia Thorup	Denmark	38.15	+1.43	21

==== 1000 m ====
The race started on 21 November 2025 at 17:00.

Rank	Pair	Lane	Name	Country	Time	Diff	WC Points
1st place, gold medalist(s)	8	i	Femke Kok	Netherlands	1:12.36; PB		60
2nd place, silver medalist(s)	6	o	Isabel Grevelt	Netherlands	1:13.14; PB	+0.78	54
3rd place, bronze medalist(s)	9	i	Marrit Fledderus	Netherlands	1:13.33	+0.97	48
4	10	o	Jutta Leerdam	Netherlands	1:13.34	+0.98	43
5	9	o	Brittany Bowe	United States	1:13.43	+1.07	40
6	10	i	Béatrice Lamarche	Canada	1:13.54	+1.18	38
7	1	o	Miho Takagi	Japan	1:13.60	+1.24	36
8	3	i	Yukino Yoshida	Japan	1:13.66; PB	+1.30	34
9	6	i	Antoinette Rijpma-de Jong	Netherlands	1:13.74	+1.38	32
10	8	o	Rio Yamada	Japan	1:13.78	+1.42	31
11	5	o	Yin Qi	China	1:13.81; PB	+1.45	30
12	2	o	Kim Min-sun	South Korea	1:13.98	+1.62	29
13	5	i	Lee Na-hyun	South Korea	1:14.13	+1.77	28
14	1	i	Han Mei	China	1:14.48	+2.12	27
15	2	i	Alexa Scott	Canada	1:14.84	+2.48	26
16	4	o	Ellia Smeding	United Kingdom	1:15.02	+2.66	25
17	3	o	Isabelle van Elst	Belgium	1:15.42	+3.06	24
18	4	i	Karolina Bosiek	Poland	1:15.42	+3.06	23
19	7	o	Erin Jackson	United States	1:15.74	+3.38	22
	7	i	Nadezhda Morozova	Kazakhstan	DQ		0

==== 1500 m ====
The race started on 22 November 2025 at 13:38.

Rank	Pair	Lane	Name	Country	Time	Diff	WC Points
1st place, gold medalist(s)	10	o	Joy Beune	Netherlands	1:51.17		60
2nd place, silver medalist(s)	9	o	Miho Takagi	Japan	1:51.68	+0.51	54
3rd place, bronze medalist(s)	9	i	Brittany Bowe	United States	1:51.84	+0.67	48
4	8	i	Antoinette Rijpma-de Jong	Netherlands	1:52.33	+1.16	43
5	8	o	Ragne Wiklund	Norway	1:52.54	+1.37	40
6	5	o	Han Mei	China	1:52.69; PB	+1.52	38
7	7	o	Nikola Zdráhalová	Czech Republic	1:52.86; PB	+1.69	36
8	10	i	Melissa Wijfje	Netherlands	1:53.15	+1.98	34
9	3	o	Kaitlyn McGregor	Switzerland	1:53.60	+2.43	32
10	5	i	Ivanie Blondin	Canada	1:53.79	+2.62	31
11	2	o	Elizaveta Golubeva	Kazakhstan	1:53.93	+2.76	30
12	3	i	Isabelle van Elst	Belgium	1:54.00; PB	+2.83	29
13	4	i	Nadezhda Morozova	Kazakhstan	1:54.31	+3.14	28
14	7	i	Angel Daleman	Netherlands	1:54.81	+3.64	27
15	6	o	Ayano Sato	Japan	1:54.97	+3.80	26
16	6	i	Li Jiaxuan	China	1:55.66	+4.49	25
17	4	o	Francesca Lollobrigida	Italy	1:56.06	+4.89	24
18	2	i	Béatrice Lamarche	Canada	1:56.40	+5.23	23
19	1	i	Greta Myers	United States	1:56.59	+5.42	22
20	1	o	Momoka Horikawa	Japan	1:57.96	+6.79	21

==== 3000 m ====
The race started on 21 November 2025 at 18:16.

Rank	Pair	Lane	Name	Country	Time	Diff	WC Points
1st place, gold medalist(s)	6	i	Joy Beune	Netherlands	3:54.42		60
2nd place, silver medalist(s)	8	o	Ragne Wiklund	Norway	3:55.25	+0.83	54
3rd place, bronze medalist(s)	7	o	Valerie Maltais	Canada	3:56.45; PB	+2.03	48
4	7	i	Isabelle Weidemann	Canada	3:56.66	+2.24	43
5	4	i	Nadezhda Morozova	Kazakhstan	3:58.03; PB	+3.61	40
6	6	o	Francesca Lollobrigida	Italy	3:59.10	+4.68	38
7	4	o	Sandrine Tas	Belgium	3:59.42; PB	+5.00	36
8	5	o	Ivanie Blondin	Canada	4:00.42	+6.00	34
9	8	i	Martina Sáblíková	Czech Republic	4:00.48	+6.06	32
10	3	o	Tai Zhien	China	4:00.99; PB	+6.57	31
11	1	o	Kseniia Korzhova	Individual Neutral Athletes	4:01.74	+7.32	30
12	5	i	Bente Kerkhoff	Netherlands	4:02.09	+7.67	29
13	2	o	Marina Zueva	Individual Neutral Athletes	4:02.12	+7.70	28
14	2	i	Marijke Groenewoud	Netherlands	4:03.19	+8.77	27
15	3	i	Momoka Horikawa	Japan	4:03.40	+8.98	26
16	1	i	Laura Hall	Canada	4:03.70	+9.28	25

==== Mass start ====
The race started on 23 November 2025 at 15:14.

Rank	Name	Country	Points	Time	WC Points
1st place, gold medalist(s)	Ivanie Blondin	Canada	61	8:08.48	60
2nd place, silver medalist(s)	Marijke Groenewoud	Netherlands	40	8:08.51	54
3rd place, bronze medalist(s)	Mia Manganello	United States	20	8:08.69	48
4	Valerie Maltais	Canada	10	8:08.72	43
5	Park Ji-woo	South Korea	6	8:09.17	40
6	Francesca Lollobrigida	Italy	3	8:09.65	38
7	Ramona Härdi	Switzerland	3	8:12.07	36
8	Aurora Grinden Løvås	Norway	3	8:15.03	34
9	Fran Vanhoutte	Belgium	3	8:17.12	32
10	Hou Jundan	China	2	8:10.09	31
11	Greta Myers	United States	2	8:12.01	30
12	Kaitlyn McGregor	Switzerland	2	8:12.41	29
13	Bente Kerkhoff	Netherlands	1	8:09.98	28
14	Josie Hofmann	Germany	1	8:14.69	27
15	Yang Binyu	China		8:09.69	26
16	Josephine Schlörb	Germany		8:09.76	25
17	Lim Lee-won	South Korea		8:09.84	24
18	Ayano Sato	Japan		8:09.89	23
19	Elizaveta Golubeva	Kazakhstan		8:10.31	22
20	Anastasiia Semenova	Individual Neutral Athletes		8:10.66	21
21	Jeannine Rosner	Austria		8:10.76	20
22	Sandrine Tas	Belgium		8:11.43	19
23	Momoka Horikawa	Japan		8:12.71	18

==== Team pursuit ====
The race started on 23 November 2025 at 13:00.

Rank	Pair	Lane	Country	Time	Diff	WC Points
1st place, gold medalist(s)	2	s	Netherlands; Joy Beune; Antoinette Rijpma-de Jong; Marijke Groenewoud	2:52.47		60
2nd place, silver medalist(s)	4	s	Canada; Isabelle Weidemann; Valerie Maltais; Ivanie Blondin	2:52.68	+0.16	54
3rd place, bronze medalist(s)	3	s	Japan; Miho Takagi; Hana Noake; Ayano Sato	2:53.09	+0.56	48
4	4	c	United States; Giorgia Birkeland; Brittany Bowe; Mia Manganello	2:53.58	+1.06	43
5	3	c	Germany; Lea Sophie Scholz; Josephine Schlörb; Josie Hofmann	2:55.97	+3.49	40
6	1	s	China; Han Mei; Hou Jundan; Li Jiaxuan	2:56.23	+3.71	38
7	2	c	Kazakhstan; Nadezhda Morozova; Arina Ilyachsehenko; Elizaveta Golubeva	2:57.71	+5.19	36
8	1	c	Belgium; Fran Vanhoutte; Isabelle van Elst; Sandrine Tas	3:00.58	+8.06	34

=== Mixed events ===
==== Mixed relay ====
The race started on 23 November 2025 at 16:07.

Rank	Heat	Country	Time	Diff	WC Points
1st place, gold medalist(s)	3	Netherlands; Wesley Dijs; Chloe Hoogendoorn	2:54.05; WR; TR		60
2nd place, silver medalist(s)	3	Germany; Stefan Emele; Anna Ostlender	2:54.41	+0.36	54
3rd place, bronze medalist(s)	3	Hungary; Bálint Bödei; Abigél Mercs	2:55.43	+1.38	48
4	1	Austria; Alexendar Farthofer; Jeannine Rosner	2:57.19	+3.14	40
5	1	China; Ayitinama Yeerhanati; Jin Wenjing	2:57.52	+3.47	38
6	4	Finland; Tuukka Suomalainen; Laura Kivioja	2:58.62	+4.57	34
7	4	Kazakhstan; Arina Ilyachsehenko; Aleksandr Klenko	2:58.73	+4.68	32
8	1	South Korea; Park Seong-hyeon; Lee Na-hyun	2:59.51	+5.46	31
9	2	Poland; Mateusz Śliwka; Iga Wojtasik	2:59.96	+5.91	30
10	2	Romania; Cosmin Nedelea; Mihaela Hogas	3:00.01	+5.96	29
11	2	Czech Republic; Jakub Kočí; Nikola Zdráhalová	3:02.24	+8.19	28
	4	Canada; Yankun Zhao; Ivanie Blondin	DQ		
	3	Portugal; Afonso Henrique Pestana Silva; Jéssica Carolina Santos Rodrigues	DQ		
	4	Norway; Bjørn Magnussen; Julie Nistad Samonsen	DQ		

== Division B result summary ==
=== Men's events ===
Event	First place	Time	Second place	Time	Third place	Time	Report
500 m (1)	Lian Ziwen; China	34.32	Katsuhiro Kuratsubo; Japan	34.34; PB	Nil Llop Izquierdo; Spain	34.35; PB	
500 m (2)	Tatsuya Shinhama; Japan	34.07	Koo Kyung-min; South Korea	34.38	Stefan Westenbroek; Netherlands	34.39; PB	
1000 m	Kjeld Nuis; Netherlands	1:07.13	Piotr Michalski; Poland	1:07.67	Kazuya Yamada; Japan	1:07.76	
1500 m	Alexander Farthofer; Austria	1:42.97; PB	Hendrik Dombek; Germany	1:43.08; PB	Valentin Thiebault; France	1:43.25; PB	
5000 m	Beau Snellink; Netherlands	6:06.99; PB	Riccardo Lorello; Italy	6:07.86; PB	Kars Jansman; Netherlands	6:08.15; PB	
Mass start^{A}	Li Yuhaochen; China	60	Ethan Cepuran; United States	40	Mathieu Belloir; France	20	
Team pursuit	Italy; Davide Ghiotto; Michele Malfatti; Andrea Giovannini	3:37.95	South Korea; Chung Jae-won; Yang Ho-jun; Cho Seung-min	3:41.22	Canada; Daniel Hall; Jake Weidemann; David La Rue	3:42.13	

^{A} In mass start, race points are accumulated during the race based on results of the intermediate sprints and the final sprint. The skater with most race points is the winner.

=== Women's events ===
Event	First place	Time	Second place	Time	Third place	Time	Report
500 m (1)	Nadezhda Morozova; Kazakhstan	37.73; PB	Kim Min-sun; South Korea	37.83	Sofia Thorup; Denmark; Vanessa Herzog; Austria	37.85; PB; 37.85	
500 m (2)	Kaja Ziomek-Nogal; Poland	37.39	Rio Yamada; Japan	37.59; PB	Brooklyn McDougall; Canada	37.67; PB	
1000 m	Sofia Thorup; Denmark	1:13.86; PB	Elizaveta Golubeva; Kazakhstan	1:14.42	Vanessa Herzog; Austria	1:14.70	
1500 m	Valerie Maltais; Canada	1:52.56; PB	Marijke Groenewoud; Netherlands	1:53.19	Yang Binyu; China	1:53.34; PB	
3000 m	Josie Hofmann; Germany	3:57.71; PB	Sanne in 't Hof; Netherlands	3:57.78; PB	Jeannine Rosner; Austria	3:58.42; PB	
Mass start^{A}	Anastasiia Semenova; Individual Neutral Athletes	60	Aurora Grinden Løvås; Norway	41	Sandrine Tas; Belgium	26	
Team pursuit	Norway; Marte Furnee; Ragne Wiklund; Aurora Løvås	3:00.91	Switzerland; Nadja Wenger; Kaitlyn McGregor; Ramona Härdi	3:01.08	Poland; Zofia Braun; Natalia Jabrzyk; Natalia Czerwonka	3:01.67	

^{A} In mass start, race points are accumulated during the race based on results of the intermediate sprints and the final sprint. The skater with most race points is the winner.
