= Speed skating at the 1992 Winter Olympics – Men's 10,000 metres =

Speed skating at the Olympics

Men's 10,000 metres at the XVI Olympic Winter Games
- Pictogram for speed skating
- Venue: L'anneau de vitesse
- Dates: 20 February 1992
- Competitors: 30 from 14 nations
- Winning time: 14:12.12

Medalists
1st place, gold medalist(s)		Bart Veldkamp; Netherlands
2nd place, silver medalist(s)		Johann Olav Koss; Norway
3rd place, bronze medalist(s)		Geir Karlstad; Norway

The men's 10,000 metres in speed skating at the 1992 Winter Olympics took place on 20 February, at the L'anneau de vitesse. 30 competitors from 14 nations participated in the event.

== Records ==
Prior to this competition, the existing world and Olympic records were as follows:

World record	Johann Olav Koss (NOR)	13:43.54	Heerenveen, Netherlands	10 February 1991
Olympic record	Tomas Gustafson (SWE)	13:48.20	Calgary, Canada	21 February 1988

== Results ==
Rank	Pair	Lane	Name	Country	Time	Time Behind
1st place, gold medalist(s)	5	o	Bart Veldkamp	Netherlands	14:12.12	–
2nd place, silver medalist(s)	4	i	Johann Olav Koss	Norway	14:14.58	+2.46
3rd place, bronze medalist(s)	3	i	Geir Karlstad	Norway	14:18.13	+6.01
4	2	i	Robert Vunderink	Netherlands	14:22.92	+10.80
5	10	o	Kazuhiro Sato	Japan	14:28.30	+16.18
6	10	i	Michael Hadschieff	Austria	14:28.80	+16.68
7	7	i	Per Bengtsson	Sweden	14:35.58	+23.46
8	7	o	Steinar Johansen	Norway	14:36.09	+23.97
9	5	i	Roberto Sighel	Italy	14:38.23	+26.11
10	12	i	Yevgeny Sanarov	Unified Team	14:38.99	+26.87
11	3	o	Thomas Bos	Netherlands	14:40.13	+28.01
12	15	i	Danny Kah	Australia	14:42.32	+30.20
13	1	o	Toshihiko Itokawa	Japan	14:42.35	+30.23
14	6	i	Jaromir Radke	Poland	14:42.60	+30.48
15	2	o	Markus Tröger	Germany	14:45.41	+33.29
16	1	i	Jonas Schön	Sweden	14:46.20	+34.08
17	8	i	Bronislav Snetkov	Unified Team	14:46.87	+34.75
18	8	o	Keiji Shirahata	Japan	14:47.56	+35.44
19	13	o	Vadim Sayutin	Unified Team	14:49.31	+37.19
20	6	o	Frank Dittrich	Germany	14:50.23	+38.11
21	9	o	Timo Järvinen	Finland	14:50.75	+38.63
22	12	o	Brian Wanek	United States	14:51.34	+39.22
23	15	o	Rudi Jeklic	Germany	14:51.89	+39.77
24	11	o	Mark Greenwald	United States	15:03.02	+50.90
25	14	i	Jiří Kyncl	Czechoslovakia	15:03.97	+51.85
26	9	i	Neal Marshall	Canada	15:07.03	+54.91
27	14	o	Jeff Klaiber	United States	15:13.65	+1:01.53
28	13	o	Jiří Musil	Czechoslovakia	15:14.18	+1:02.06
29	11	i	Nyamdondovyn Ganbold	Mongolia	15:18.56	+1:06.44
-	4	o	Phillip Tahmindjis	Australia	DSQ	
