= 1990 World Allround Speed Skating Championships =

International speed skating competition

1990 World Allround Speed Skating Championships for Men
- Venue: Eisschnelllaufbahn Innsbruck, Innsbruck, Austria
- Dates: 17–18 February
- Competitors: 37 skaters from 19 nations

Medalist men
1st place, gold medalist(s)		Johann Olav Koss	NOR
2nd place, silver medalist(s)		Ben van der Burg	NED
3rd place, bronze medalist(s)		Bart Veldkamp	NED

The World Allround Speed Skating Championships for Men took place on 17 and 18 February 1990 in Innsbruck at the Eisschnelllaufbahn Innsbruck ice rink.

Title holder was the Netherlander Leo Visser.

== Classification ==
Rank	Skater	Country	Points Samalog	500m	5000m	1500m	10,000m
1st place, gold medalist(s)	Johann Olav Koss	Norway	164.099	38.86 (11)	7:00.50 (2)	1:57.19 (3)	14:42.52 (3)
2nd place, silver medalist(s)	Ben van der Burg	Netherlands	164.489	38.79 (7)	7:01.13 (3)	1:56.23 (gold)	14:56.87 (5)
3rd place, bronze medalist(s)	Bart Veldkamp	Netherlands	164.648	39.72 (22)	6:56.82 (gold)	1:58.36 (6)	14:35.87 (gold)
4	Gerard Kemkers	Netherlands	165.471	38.51 (4)	7:05.85 (4)	1:58.19 (4)	14:59.60 (6)
5	Thomas Bos	Netherlands	166.816	39.66 (21)	7:08.57 (5)	1:58.40 (7)	14:56.67 (4)
6	Geir Karlstad	Norway	166.931	39.82 (23)	7:13.01 (6)	1:59.08 (9)	14:42.34 (2)
7	Michael Hadschieff	Austria	167.108	38.61 (5)	7:15.07 (9)	1:58.35 (5)	15:10.82 (8)
8	Joakim Karlberg	Sweden	168.097	39.28 (18)	7:14.10 (8)	1:58.65 (8)	15:17.14 (10)
9	Danny Kah	Australia	168.455	40.01 (26)	7:13.17 (7)	2:00.04 (11)	15:02.30 (7)
10	Ådne Søndrål	Norway	168.850	38.06 (2)	7:21.23 (19)	1:56.99 (2)	15:53.42 (16)
11	Tomas Gustafson	Sweden	169.498	39.22 (16)	7:18.04 (12)	2:00.67 (16)	15:25.02 (11)
12	Georg Herda	West Germany	170.257	38.82 (9)	7:19.51 (15)	2:01.07 (17)	15:42.61 (14)
13	Kazuhiro Sato	Japan	170.640	40.41 (30)	7:16.76 (11)	2:01.32 (20)	15:14.65 (9)
14	Masahiko Omura	Japan	170.875	39.23 (17)	7:19.47 (14)	2:00.13 (12)	15:48.41 (15)
15	Christian Eminger	Austria	170.875	40.82 (33)	7:15.37 (10)	2:00.52 (15)	15:26.91 (12)
16	Frank Dittrich	East Germany	172.108	40.45 (31)	7:18.51 (13)	2:02.69 (31)	15:38.22 (13)
NC17	Bae Ki-tae	South Korea	122.893	37.37 (gold)	7:35.67 (32)	1:59.87 (10)	–
NC18	Eric Flaim	United States	123.348	38.16 (3)	7:28.22 (25)	2:01.10 (19)	–
NC19	Toru Aoyanagi	Japan	123.353	38.81 (8)	7:21.80 (20)	2:01.09 (18)	–
NC20	Mariusz Maślanka	Poland	123.407	38.92 (14)	7:23.47 (23)	2:00.42 (14)	–
NC21	Peter Adeberg	East Germany	123.715	38.69 (6)	7:22.39 (21)	2:02.36 (26)	–
NC22	Benoît Lamarche	Canada	123.774	38.88 (13)	7:28.51 (27)	2:00.13 (12)	–
NC23	Markus Tröger	West Germany	124.013	39.40 (20)	7:19.73 (16)	2:01.92 (24)	–
NC24	Naoki Kotake	Japan	124.585	38.86 (11)	7:28.45 (26)	2:02.64 (29)	–
NC25	Michael Spielmann	East Germany	124.649	39.97 (25)	7:21.09 (18)	2:01.71 (23)	–
NC26	Konstantin Kalistratov	Soviet Union	124.957	39.20 (15)	7:31.97 (30)	2:01.68 (22)	–
NC27	Zsolt Zakarias	Austria	125.450	40.03 (27)	7:25.64 (24)	2:02.57 (28)	–
NC28	Timo Järvinen	Finland	125.630	40.65 (32)	7:20.97 (17)	2:02.65 (30)	–
NC29	Kiril Klisho	Soviet Union	125.648	38.83 (10)	7:41.48* (34)	2:02.01 (25)	–
NC30	Andrey Muratov	Soviet Union	125.756	39.95 (24)	7:33.16 (31)	2:01.47 (21)	–
NC31	Aleksandr Trushin	Soviet Union	126.300	40.97 (34)	7:22.67 (22)	2:03.19 (32)	–
NC32	Phillip Tahmindjis	Australia	126.531	40.28 (29)	7:31.58 (29)	2:03.28 (33)	–
NC33	Jiří Kyncl	Czechoslovakia	128.342	41.26 (35)	7:29.09 (28)	2:06.52 (34)	–
NC34	Dave Silk	United States	128.355	40.14 (28)	7:54.15* (36)	2:02.40 (27)	–
NC35	Liu Wei	China	128.466	39.32 (19)	7:48.86 (35)	2:06.78 (35)	–
NC36	Martin Feigenwinter	Switzerland	133.223	43.40 (36)	7:36.27 (33)	2:12.59 (36)	–
NC	Roberto Sighel	Italy	–	1:14.65* (37)	DNS	–	–

* = Fell
DNS = Did not start

== Attribution ==
In Dutch
