= 1989 World Allround Speed Skating Championships =

Sporting event

1989 World Allround Speed Skating Championships for Men
- Venue: Valle Hovin, Oslo, Norway
- Dates: 11–12 February
- Competitors: 36 skaters from 19 nations

Medalist men
1st place, gold medalist(s)		Leo Visser	NED
2nd place, silver medalist(s)		Gerard Kemkers	NED
3rd place, bronze medalist(s)		Geir Karlstad	NOR

The World Allround Speed Skating Championships for Men took place on 11 and 12 February 1989 in Oslo at the Valle Hovin ice rink.

Title holder was the American Eric Flaim.

== Classification ==
Rank	Skater	Country	Points Samalog	500m	5000m	1500m	10,000m
1st place, gold medalist(s)	Leo Visser	Netherlands	165.698	39.48 (14)	7:03.52 (gold)	2:00.06 (gold)	14:36.93 (2)
2nd place, silver medalist(s)	Gerard Kemkers	Netherlands	167.101	39.71 (19)	7:09.41 (4)	2:01.70 (7)	14:37.69 (3)
3rd place, bronze medalist(s)	Geir Karlstad	Norway	167.622	40.41 (25)	7:09.26 (3)	2:01.80 (8)	14:33.72 (gold)
4	Eric Flaim	United States	168.059	38.36 (2)	7:17.57 (11)	2:01.99 (9)	15:05.58 (9)
5	Michael Spielmann	East Germany	168.102	39.53 (15)	7:14.83(14)	2:01.45 (5)	14:52.12 (4)
6	Toru Aoyanagi	Japan	169.015	38.48 (4)	7:20.59 (19)	2:03.21 (13)	15:08.12 (11)
7	Christian Eminger	Austria	169.114	40.32 (24)	7:13.81 (6)	2:01.39 (4)	14:59.00 (6)
8	Johann Olav Koss	Norway	169.838	39.57 (16)	7:16.02 (9)	2:00.48 (2)	15:30.13 (15)
9	Michael Hadschieff	Austria	169.888	39.10 (6)	7:15.95 (8)	2:02.20 (10)	15:29.20 (14)
10	Bart Veldkamp	Netherlands	170.054	40.73 (30)	7:09.25 (2)	2:04.47 (19)	14:58.18 (5)
11	Ildar Garajev	Soviet Union	170.569	39.75 (21)	7:18.05 (13)	2:01.18 (3)	15:32.42 (16)
12	Munehisa Kuroiwa	Japan	170.613	39.44 (12)	7:19.04 (15)	2:05.02 (25)	15:11.93 (12)
13	Kazuhiro Sato	Japan	171.271	40.80 (31)	7:11.68 (5)	2:06.60 (32)	15:02.07 (8)
14	Rudi Jeklic	West Germany	172.047	41.17 (32)	7:16.07 (10)	2:05.89 (29)	15:06.14 (10)
15	Roberto Sighel	Italy	172.158	42.19 (33)	7:17.74 (12)	2:03.42 (15)	15:01.09 (7)
16	Jaromir Radke	Poland	173.736	42.25 (34)	7:18.12 (14)	2:04.50 (20)	15:23.49 (13)
NC17	Peter Adeberg	East Germany	124.341	39.11 (7)	7:27.38 (24)	2:01.48 (6)	–
NC18	Nikolay Gulyayev	Soviet Union	124.344	38.12 (gold)	7:30.81 (26)	2:03.43 (16)	–
NC19	Bronislav Snetkov	Soviet Union	124.512	39.33 (9)	7:20.06 (18)	2:03.53 (17)	–
NC20	Danny Kah	Australia	124.581	39.68 (18)	7:19.35 (16)	2:02.90 (11)	–
NC21	Georg Herda	West Germany	124.693	38.93 (5)	7:27.07 (23)	2:03.17 (12)	–
NC22	Tomas Gustafson	Sweden	124.945	39.44 (12)	7:19.35 (16)	2:04.71 (24)	–
NC23	Naoki Kotake	Japan	125.428	39.59 (17)	7:22.85 (21)	2:04.66 (23)	–
NC24	Mikko Mäkinen	Finland	126.609	40.69 (29)	7:22.06 (20)	2:05.14 (26)	–
NC25	Gregor Jelonek	Canada	126.786	39.15 (8)	7:42.53 (32)	2:04.15 (18)	–
NC26	Zsolt Zakarias	Austria	126.791	40.41 (25)	7:32.55 (28)	2:03.38 (14)	–
NC27	Jeff Klaiber	United States	126.844	40.53 (28)	7:27.98 (25)	2:04.55 (21)	–
NC28	Robert Dubreuil	Canada	126.881	38.38 (3)	7:47.75 (35)	2:05.18 (27)	–
NC29	Notker Ledergerber	Switzerland	127.135	40.56 (28)	7:27.02 (22)	2:05.62 (28)	–
NC30	Fabio Monti	Italy	127.378	39.42 (11)	7:35.72 (29)	2:07.16 (33)	–
NC31	Nat Mills	United States	127.884	39.41 (10)	7:37.34 (30)	2:08.22 (35)	–
NC32	Chris Shelley	United States	127.989	40.12 (23)	7:43.23 (33)	2:04.64 (22)	–
NC33	Kim Gwan-gyu	South Korea	128.001	40.08 (22)	7:37.81 (31)	2:06.42 (30)	–
NC34	Kevin Scott	Canada	128.295	39.72 (20)	7:44.25 (34)	2:06.45 (31)	–
NC35	Jiří Kyncl	Czechoslovakia	130.138	42.43 (35)	7:31.45 (27)	2:07.69 (34)	–
NC	Loukas Patsoulas	Greece	112.631	51.12 (36)	10:15.11 (36)	DNS	–

DNS = Did not start

== Attribution ==
In Dutch
