= 1991 World Allround Speed Skating Championships =

International speed skating competition

1991 World Allround Speed Skating Championships for Men
- Venue: Thialf, Heerenveen, Netherlands
- Dates: 9–10 February
- Competitors: 40 skaters from 21 nations

Medalist men
1st place, gold medalist(s)		Johann Olav Koss	NOR
2nd place, silver medalist(s)		Roberto Sighel	ITA
3rd place, bronze medalist(s)		Bart Veldkamp	NED

The World Allround Speed Skating Championships for Men took place on 9 and 10 February 1991 in Heerenveen at the Thialf ice rink.

Title holder was the Norwegian Johann Olav Koss.

== Classification ==
Rank	Skater	Country	Points Samalog	500m	5000m	1500m	10,000m
1st place, gold medalist(s)	Johann Olav Koss	Norway	157.396	38.46 (6)	6:41.73 (gold)	1:52.76 (gold)	13:43.54 (gold)
2nd place, silver medalist(s)	Roberto Sighel	Italy	160.125	38.27 (4)	6:49.04 (3)	1:55.11 (4)	14:11.63 (6)
3rd place, bronze medalist(s)	Bart Veldkamp	Netherlands	160.391	39.38 (23)	6:46.46 (2)	1:56.08 (11)	13:53.45 (2)
4	Leo Visser	Netherlands	160.392	38.81 (10)	6:50.34 (5)	1:55.18 (5)	14:03.10 (3)
5	Tomas Gustafson	Sweden	160.860	38.45 (5)	6:56.60 (9)	1:55.66 (9)	14:03.94 (4)
6	Thomas Bos	Netherlands	161.530	39.03 (17)	6:53.73 (7)	1:55.22 (7)	14:14.43 (7)
7	Danny Kah	Australia	161.575	38.95 (15)	6:53.37 (6)	1:55.21 (6)	14:17.70 (8)
8	Geir Karlstad	Norway	162.282	39.96 (30)	6:49.37 (4)	1:56.89 (17)	14:08.45 (5)
9	Peter Adeberg	Germany	163.042	37.52 (gold)	7:07.60 (28)	1:54.23 (2)	14:53.73 (15)
10	Markus Tröger	Germany	163.066	38.86 (13)	6:56.75 (10)	1:56.24 (12)	14:35.70 (12)
11	Uwe Tonat	Germany	164.461	39.90 (29)	6:56.95 (11)	1:57.66 (22)	14:32.93 (11)
12	Keiji Shirahata	Japan	164.477	39.52 (25)	6:59.24 (12)	1:59.20 (32)	14:26.00 (10)
13	Jaromir Radke	Poland	165.242	40.96 (35)	6:56.10 (8)	1:58.45 (27)	14:23.79 (9)
14	Per Bengtsson	Sweden	165.800	40.60 (34)	6:59.45 (14)	1:58.26 (26)	14:36.71 (14)
15	Toru Aoyanagi	Japan	171.057	47.04* (38)	6:59.30 (13)	1:54.80 (3)	14:36.43 (13)
NC	Naoki Kotake	Japan	120.015	39.10 (18)	7:00.02 (15)	1:56.74 (16)	~~14:40.33~~ DQ
NC16	Ildar Garayev	Soviet Union	119.316	38.61 (8)	7:02.06 (19)	1:55.50 (8)	–
NC17	Ben van der Burg	Netherlands	119.649	38.58 (7)	7:01.83 (18)	1:56.66 (14)	–
NC18	Michael Hadschieff	Austria	119.987	38.78 (9)	7:03.07 (21)	1:56.70 (15)	–
NC19	Ådne Søndrål	Norway	120.054	38.98 (16)	7:05.18 (24)	1:55.67 (10)	–
NC20	O Yong-seok	South Korea	120.334	38.87 (14)	7:06.18 (27)	1:56.54 (13)	–
NC21	Zsolt Zakarias	Austria	120.981	39.35 (22)	7:03.51 (22)	1:57.84 (24)	
NC22	Christian Eminger	Austria	121.147	39.77 (27)	7:01.24 (17)	1:57.76 (23)	–
NC23	Lee In-hun	South Korea	121.262	38.09 (3)	7:20.16 (37)	1:57.47 (19)	–
NC24	Rudi Jeklic	Germany	121.374	39.46 (24)	7:05.18 (24)	1:58.19 (25)	–
NC25	Brian Wanek	United States	121.387	39.16 (19)	7:10.64 (31)	1:57.49 (20)	–
NC26	Thor Olav Tveter	Norway	121.559	39.27 (20)	7:11.56 (32)	1:57.40 (18)	–
NC27	Craig McNicoll	United Kingdom	122.021	38.84 (11)	7:14.51 (34)	1:59.19 (31)	–
NC28	Jonas Schön	Sweden	122.313	39.77 (27)	7:06.17 (26)	1:59.78 (34)	–
NC29	Neal Marshall	Canada	122.348	40.47 (33)	7:02.28 (20)	1:58.95 (30)	–
NC30	Phillip Tahmindjis	Australia	122.401	39.30 (21)	7:15.51 (36)	1:58.65 (29)	–
NC31	Paweł Abratkiewicz	Poland	122.463	38.84 (11)	7:24.57 (38)	1:57.50 (21)	–
NC32	Mikko Mäkinen	Finland	122.878	40.13 (31)	7:04.22 (23)	2:00.98 (36)	–
NC33	Nate Mills	United States	124.622	37.87 (2)	7:09.09 (30)	2:11.53* (40)	–
NC34	Notker Ledergerber	Switzerland	124.862	41.30 (36)	7:14.66 (35)	2:00.29 (35)	–
NC35	Thierry Lamberton	France	125.741	40.43 (32)	7:28.08 (39)	2:01.51 (37)	–
NC36	Jiří Kyncl	Czechoslovakia	126.074	41.79 (37)	7:12.78 (33)	2:03.02 (38)	–
NC37	István Dolp	Hungary	127.611	39.66 (26)	7:41.08 (40)	2:05.53 (39)	–
NC	Kazuhiro Sato	Japan	81.520	DQ	7:00.20 (16)	1:58.50 (28)	–
NC	Desző Horváth	Romania	82.653	DQ	7:08.33 (29)	1:59.46 (33)	–

* = Fell
DQ = Disqualified

== Attribution ==
In Dutch
