= 1992 World Allround Speed Skating Championships =

International speed skating competition

1992 World Allround Speed Skating Championships for Men
- Venue: Olympic Oval, Calgary, Canada
- Dates: 21–22 March
- Competitors: 34 skaters from 17 nations

Medalist men
| 1st place, gold medalist(s) | | Roberto Sighel | ITA |
| 2nd place, silver medalist(s) | | Falko Zandstra | NED |
| 3rd place, bronze medalist(s) | | Johann Olav Koss | NOR |

The World Allround Speed Skating Championships for Men took place on 21 and 22 March 1992 in Calgary at the Olympic Oval ice rink.

Title holder was the Norwegian Johann Olav Koss.

== Classification ==
| Rank | Skater | Country | Points Samalog | 500m | 5000m | 1500m | 10,000m |
|---|---|---|---|---|---|---|---|
| 1st place, gold medalist(s) | Roberto Sighel | Italy | 157.150 WR | 37.38 (3) | 6:43.91 (2) | 1:52.38 (2) | 13:58.39 (4) |
| 2nd place, silver medalist(s) | Falko Zandstra | Netherlands | 157.565 | 37.98 (7) | 6:44.14 (3) | 1:52.17 (gold) | 13:55.63 (gold) |
| 3rd place, bronze medalist(s) | Johann Olav Koss | Norway | 157.827 | 38.17 (8) | 6:42.15 (gold) | 1:52.62 (3) | 13:58.05 (3) |
| 4 | Thomas Bos | Netherlands | 159.344 | 38.52 (12) | 6:44.24 (5) | 1:53.16 (6) | 14:13.61* (7) |
| 5 | Rintje Ritsma | Netherlands | 159.402 | 37.80 (5) | 6:50.98 (8) | 1:53.58 (8) | 14:12.89 (6) |
| 6 | Geir Karlstad | Norway | 160.203 | 39.47 (23) | 6:44.19 (4) | 1:55.24 (14) | 13:58.03 (2) |
| 7 | Eric Flaim | United States | 160.219 | 37.26 (2) | 6:55.11 (14) | 1:53.19 (7) | 14:34.37 (12) |
| 8 | Toru Aoyanagi | Japan | 160.915 | 37.58 (4) | 6:57.46 (20) | 1:52.91 (5) | 14:39.07 (14) |
| 9 | Jonas Schön | Sweden | 161.385 | 39.16 (19) | 6:50.35 (6) | 1:54.92 (13) | 14:17.69 (9) |
| 10 | Naoki Kotake | Japan | 161.698 | 37.87 (6) | 6:58.51 (21) | 1:54.47 (10) | 14:36.43 (13) |
| 11 | Kazuhiro Sato | Japan | 161.717 | 39.28 (20) | 6:50.42 (7) | 1:56.06 (17) | 14:14.19 (8) |
| 12 | Yevgeny Sanarov | CIS | 161.987 | 39.63 (24) | 6:52.65 (9) | 1:55.84 (16) | 14:09.59 (5) |
| 13 | Per Bengtsson | Sweden | 163.622 | 40.10 (27) | 6:53.11 (11) | 1:56.97 (20) | 14:24.42 (11) |
| 14 | Steinar Johansen | Norway | 173.85 | 50.75* (33) | 6:54.25 (13) | 1:56.21 (19) | 14:18.78 (10) |
| 15 | Ådne Søndrål | Norway | 180.606 | 57.04* (34) | 6:53.33 (12) | 1:54.03 (9) | 14:44.46* (15) |
| DQ | Markus Tröger | Germany | 118.307 | 38.85 (16) | 6:52.97 (10) | 1:54.48 (11) | ~~14:21.34~~ (DQ) |
| NC17 | Peter Adeberg | Germany | 117.898 | 37.07 (gold) | 7:12.58 (31) | 1:52.71 (4) | – |
| NC18 | Michael Hadschieff | Austria | 118.166 | 38.32 (9) | 6:56.33 (18) | 1:54.64 (12) | – |
| NC19 | Neal Marshall | Canada | 119.441 | 38.76 (13) | 7:01.45 (22) | 1:55.61 (15) | – |
| NC20 | Tomas Gustafson | Sweden | 120.475 | 38.44 (11) | 7:07.09 (27) | 1:57.98 (27) | – |
| NC21 | Frank Dittrich | Germany | 120.646 | 39.70 (25) | 6:56.26 (17) | 1:57.96 (26) | – |
| NC22 | Paweł Jaroszek | Poland | 120.941 | 39.15 (18) | 7:10.95 (29) | 1:56.09 (18) | – |
| NC23 | Rudi Jeklic | Germany | 120.951 | 39.39 (22) | 7:03.78 (23) | 1:57.55 (22) | – |
| NC24 | Christian Eminger | Austria | 120.985 | 40.17 (29) | 6:56.15 (15) | 1:57.60 (23) | – |
| NC25 | Notker Ledergerber | Switzerland | 121.03 | 39.30 (21) | 7:03.84 (24) | 1:58.04 (28) | – |
| NC26 | Andrey Krivosheyev | CIS | 121.367 | 40.16 (28) | 6:56.24 (16) | 1:58.75 (30) | – |
| NC27 | Danny Kah | Australia | 121.627 | 39.11 (17) | 7:11.64 (30) | 1:58.06 (29) | – |
| NC28 | Phillip Tahmindjis | Australia | 121.648 | 39.78 (26) | 7:07.32 (28) | 1:57.41 (21) | – |
| NC29 | Bart Veldkamp | Netherlands | 122.05 | 38.79 (15) | 7:14.17* (32) | 1:59.53 (32) | – |
| NC30 | Jiří Kyncl | Czech Republic | 122.085 | 40.26 (30) | 7:05.65 (25) | 1:57.78 (24) | – |
| NC31 | Timo Järvinen | Finland | 122.246 | 40.29 (31) | 7:06.53 (26) | 1:57.91 (25) | – |
| NC32 | Jaromir Radke | Poland | 122.293 | 40.72 (32) | 6:57.10 (19) | 1:59.59 (33) | – |
| NC33 | Keiji Shirahata | Japan | 122.751 | 38.78 (14) | 7:21.51* (33) | 1:59.46 (31) | – |
| NC | Alessandro De Taddei | Italy | – | 38.36 (10) | DNS | – | – |

* = Fell
DNS = Did not start

== Attribution ==
In Dutch
