= Germany at the 1992 Winter Olympics =

- IOC code: GER
- NOC: German Olympic Sports Confederation

in Albertville
- Competitors: 111 (75 men, 36 women) in 11 sports
- Flag bearer: Wolfgang Hoppe (bobsleigh)
- Medals Ranked 1st: Gold 10 Silver 10 Bronze 6 Total 26

Winter Olympics appearances (overview)
- 1928; 1932; 1936; 1948; 1952; 1956–1988; 1992; 1994; 1998; 2002; 2006; 2010; 2014; 2018; 2022; 2026

Other related appearances
- United Team of Germany (1956–1964); East Germany (1968–1988); West Germany (1968–1988)

Germany competed at the 1992 Winter Olympics in Albertville, France. It was the first time that the nation had competed at the Olympic Games following reunification in 1990 and for the first time as a single nation since 1936. Previously, West Germany and East Germany had sent independent teams to the Games.

== Competitors ==
The following is the list of number of competitors in the Games.

Sport	Men	Women	Total
Alpine skiing	5	9	14
Biathlon	6	4	10
Bobsleigh	12	–	12
Cross-country skiing	5	5	10
Figure skating	2	4	6
Freestyle skiing	1	3	4
Ice hockey	23	–	23
Luge	7	3	10
Nordic combined	4	–	4
Ski jumping	5	–	5
Speed skating	6	8	14
Total	75	36	111

== Medalists ==
Medal	Name	Sport	Event
Gold	Mark Kirchner	Biathlon	Men's 10 km sprint
Gold	Ricco Groß; Jens Steinigen; Mark Kirchner; Fritz Fischer	Biathlon	Men's 4 x 7.5 km relay
Gold	Antje Misersky	Biathlon	Women's 15 km
Gold	Georg Hackl	Luge	Men's individual
Gold	Stefan Krauße; Jan Behrendt	Luge	Men's doubles
Gold	Uwe-Jens Mey	Speed skating	Men's 500 m
Gold	Olaf Zinke	Speed skating	Men's 1000 m
Gold	Jacqueline Börner	Speed skating	Women's 1500 m
Gold	Gunda Niemann	Speed skating	Women's 3000 m
Gold	Gunda Niemann	Speed skating	Women's 5000m
Silver	Ricco Groß	Biathlon	Men's 10 km sprint
Silver	Mark Kirchner	Biathlon	Men's 20 km
Silver	Antje Misersky	Biathlon	Women's 7.5 km
Silver	Uschi Disl; Antje Misersky; Petra Schaaf	Biathlon	Women's 3 x 7.5 km relay
Silver	Rudi Lochner; Markus Zimmermann	Bobsleigh	Two-man
Silver	Wolfgang Hoppe; Bogdan Musioł; Axel Kühn; René Hannemann	Bobsleigh	Four-man
Silver	Yves Mankel; Thomas Rudolph	Luge	Men's doubles
Silver	Gunda Niemann	Speed skating	Women's 1500 m
Silver	Heike Warnicke	Speed skating	Women's 3000 m
Silver	Heike Warnicke	Speed skating	Women's 5000 m
Bronze	Katja Seizinger	Alpine skiing	Women's super-G
Bronze	Christoph Langen; Günther Eger	Bobsleigh	Two-man
Bronze	Susi Erdmann	Luge	Women's individual
Bronze	Christa Luding	Speed skating	Women's 500 m
Bronze	Monique Garbrecht	Speed skating	Women's 1000 m
Bronze	Claudia Pechstein	Speed skating	Women's 5000 m

== Alpine skiing ==
Men

Athlete	Event	Race 1	Race 2	Total	
Athlete	Event	Time	Time	Time	Rank
Berni Huber	Downhill			1:53.38	19
Hans-Jörg Tauscher	Downhill			1:51.49	7
Markus Wasmeier	Downhill			1:50.62	4
Berni Huber	Super-G			1:16.78	31
Hans-Jörg Tauscher	Super-G			1:15.98	21
Markus Wasmeier	Super-G			1:14.58	9
Markus Wasmeier	Giant Slalom	DNF	–	DNF	–
Armin Bittner	Giant Slalom	1:07.77	DNF	DNF	–
Peter Roth	Giant Slalom	1:07.68	DSQ	DSQ	–
Peter Roth	Slalom	54.07	54.68	1:48.75	16
Armin Bittner	Slalom	53.19	DNF	DNF	–

Men's combined

Athlete	Downhill	Slalom		Total	
Athlete	Time	Time 1	Time 2	Points	Rank
Markus Wasmeier	1:45.91	52.29	52.86	32.77	5

Women

Athlete	Event	Race 1	Race 2	Total	
Athlete	Event	Time	Time	Time	Rank
Michaela Gerg-Leitner	Downhill			1:54.99	18
Miriam Vogt	Downhill			1:53.89	9
Katrin Gutensohn	Downhill			1:53.71	6
Katja Seizinger	Downhill			1:52.67	4
Miriam Vogt	Super-G			1:25.40	18
Regine Mösenlechner	Super-G			1:24.85	14
Michaela Gerg-Leitner	Super-G			1:23.77	7
Katja Seizinger	Super-G			1:23.19	3rd place, bronze medalist(s)
Michaela Gerg-Leitner	Giant Slalom	1:08.69	DNF	DNF	–
Christina Meier-Höck	Giant Slalom	1:08.07	1:07.26	2:15.33	11
Katja Seizinger	Giant Slalom	1:07.40	1:07.56	2:14.96	8
Traudl Hächer-Gavet	Giant Slalom	1:07.26	1:08.87	2:16.13	14
Martina Ertl-Renz	Slalom	50.29	46.12	1:36.41	15

Women's combined

Athlete	Downhill	Slalom		Total	
Athlete	Time	Time 1	Time 2	Points	Rank
Regina Häusl	1:27.95	DSQ	–	DSQ	–
Miriam Vogt	1:27.35	36.61	36.29	48.52	9
Michaela Gerg-Leitner	1:27.26	DSQ	–	DSQ	–
Katja Seizinger	1:26.42	36.23	DNF	DNF	–

== Biathlon ==
Men

Event	Athlete	Misses ^{1}	Time	Rank
10 km Sprint	Frank-Peter Roetsch	2	26:54.1	9
10 km Sprint	Jens Steinigen	0	26:34.8	6
10 km Sprint	Ricco Groß	1	26:18.0	2nd place, silver medalist(s)
10 km Sprint	Mark Kirchner	0	26:02.3	1st place, gold medalist(s)

Event	Athlete	Time	Misses	Adjusted time ^{2}	Rank
20 km	Frank-Peter Roetsch	56:43.8	7	1'03:43.8	53
20 km	Jens Steinigen	58:01.8	3	1'01:01.8	29
20 km	Steffen Hoos	59:17.7	1	1'00:17.7	18
20 km	Mark Kirchner	54:40.8	3	57:40.8	2nd place, silver medalist(s)

Men's 4 x 7.5 km relay

Athletes	Race		
Athletes	Misses ^{1}	Time	Rank
Ricco Groß; Jens Steinigen; Mark Kirchner; Fritz Fischer	0	1'24:43.5	1st place, gold medalist(s)

Women

Event	Athlete	Misses ^{1}	Time	Rank
7.5 km Sprint	Uschi Disl	2	25:58.9	11
7.5 km Sprint	Inga Kesper	2	25:57.3	10
7.5 km Sprint	Petra Schaaf	1	25:10.4	6
7.5 km Sprint	Antje Misersky	2	24:45.1	2nd place, silver medalist(s)

Event	Athlete	Time	Misses	Adjusted time ^{2}	Rank
15 km	Uschi Disl	50:40.2	6	56:40.2	24
15 km	Inga Kesper	51:42.3	3	54:42.3	15
15 km	Petra Schaaf	50:56.3	3	53:56.3	13
15 km	Antje Misersky	50:47.2	1	51:47.2	1st place, gold medalist(s)

Women's 3 x 7.5 km relay

Athletes	Race		
Athletes	Misses ^{1}	Time	Rank
Uschi Disl; Antje Misersky; Petra Schaaf	1	1'16:18.4	2nd place, silver medalist(s)

^{1} A penalty loop of 150 metres had to be skied per missed target.
^{2} One minute added per missed target.

== Bobsleigh ==
Sled	Athletes	Event	Run 1		Run 2		Run 3		Run 4		Total	
Sled	Athletes	Event	Time	Rank	Time	Rank	Time	Rank	Time	Rank	Time	Rank
GER-1	Rudi Lochner; Markus Zimmermann	Two-man	1:00.69	11	1:01.00	4	1:00.90	2	1:00.96	1	4:03.55	2nd place, silver medalist(s)
GER-2	Christoph Langen; Günther Eger	Two-man	1:00.33	4	1:01.06	5	1:01.14	5	1:01.10	3	4:03.63	3rd place, bronze medalist(s)

Sled	Athletes	Event	Run 1		Run 2		Run 3		Run 4		Total	
Sled	Athletes	Event	Time	Rank	Time	Rank	Time	Rank	Time	Rank	Time	Rank
GER-1	Wolfgang Hoppe; Bogdan Musioł; Axel Kühn; René Hannemann	Four-man	58.00	3	58.52	1	58.68	7	58.72	2	3:53.92	2nd place, silver medalist(s)
GER-2	Harald Czudaj; Tino Bonk; Axel Jang; Alexander Szelig	Four-man	58.54	9	58.55	2	58.62	5	58.71	1	3:54.42	6

== Cross-country skiing ==
Men

Event	Athlete	Race	
Event	Athlete	Time	Rank
10 km C	Janko Neuber	30:29.8	32
10 km C	Johann Mühlegg	30:29.4	31
10 km C	Torald Rein	30:25.1	29
10 km C	Jochen Behle	29:58.2	24
15 km pursuit^{1} F	Janko Neuber	42:10.4	23
15 km pursuit^{1} F	Torald Rein	41:48.1	21
15 km pursuit^{1} F	Johann Mühlegg	41:11.8	16
30 km C	Janko Neuber	1'31:57.8	47
30 km C	Torald Rein	1'29:08.5	30
30 km C	Holger Bauroth	1'28:58.1	28
30 km C	Jochen Behle	1'25:59.8	15
50 km F	Janko Neuber	2'14:37.1	29
50 km F	Holger Bauroth	2'13:49.8	26
50 km F	Johann Mühlegg	2'07:45.2	7

^{1} Starting delay based on 10 km results.
C = Classical style, F = Freestyle

Men's 4 × 10 km relay

Athletes	Race	
Athletes	Time	Rank
Holger Bauroth; Jochen Behle; Torald Rein; Johann Mühlegg	1'43:41.7	6

Women

Event	Athlete	Race	
Event	Athlete	Time	Rank
5 km C	Manuela Oschmann	16:01.7	42
5 km C	Simone Opitz	15:24.9	27
5 km C	Heike Wezel	15:04.1	17
5 km C	Gabriele Heß	15:03.7	16
10 km pursuit^{2} F	Manuela Oschmann	30:52.5	38
10 km pursuit^{2} F	Heike Wezel	29:08.6	25
10 km pursuit^{2} F	Gabriele Heß	28:19.2	14
10 km pursuit^{2} F	Simone Opitz	28:17.3	12
15 km C	Heike Wezel	45:50.6	19
15 km C	Manuela Oschmann	45:28.8	15
30 km F	Ina Kümmel	1'36:48.2	46
30 km F	Heike Wezel	1'33:34.2	32
30 km F	Gabriele Heß	1'29:43.8	15
30 km F	Simone Opitz	1'27:17.4	8

^{2} Starting delay based on 5 km results.
C = Classical style, F = Freestyle

Women's 4 × 5 km relay

Athletes	Race	
Athletes	Time	Rank
Heike Wezel; Gabriele Heß; Simone Opitz; Ina Kümmel	1'02:22.6	8

== Figure skating ==
Women

Athlete	SP	FS	TFP	Rank
Patricia Neske	16	11	18.0	13
Marina Kielmann	15	19	16.5	10

Pairs

Athletes	SP	FS	TFP	Rank
Mandy Wötzel; Axel Rauschenbach	10	8	13.0	8
Peggy Schwartz; Alexander König	8	7	11.5	7

== Freestyle skiing ==
Men

Athlete	Event	Qualification			Final		
Athlete	Event	Time	Points	Rank	Time	Points	Rank
Klaus Weese	Moguls	33.16	21.63	19	did not advance		

Women

Athlete	Event	Qualification			Final		
Athlete	Event	Time	Points	Rank	Time	Points	Rank
Yvonne Seifert	Moguls	39.84	20.17	9	did not advance		
Birgit Keppler-Stein	Moguls	42.27	21.32	8 Q	41.79	21.44	5
Tatjana Mittermayer	Moguls	42.57	21.90	6 Q	40.84	22.33	4

== Ice hockey ==
=== Group A ===
Twelve participating teams were placed in two groups. After playing a round-robin, the top four teams in each group advanced to the Medal Round while the last two teams competed in the Consolation Round for the 9th to 12th places.

Team advanced to the Final Round
Team sent to compete in the Consolation Round

Team	GP	W	L	T	GF	GA	DIF	PTS
United States	5	4	0	1	18	7	11	9
Sweden	5	3	0	2	22	11	11	8
Finland	5	3	1	1	22	11	11	7
Germany	5	2	3	0	11	12	-1	4
Italy	5	1	4	0	18	24	-6	2
Poland	5	0	5	0	4	30	-26	0

Finland	5:1	Germany
United States	2:0	Germany
Sweden	3:1	Germany
Germany	5:2	Italy
Germany	4:0	Poland

=== Final round ===
Quarter-finals

Canada	4:3	Germany

Consolation Round 5th-8th Places

France	4:5	Germany

5th Place Match

Sweden	4:3	Germany 6th

- Team Roster
  - Karl Friesen
  - Helmut de Raaf
  - Josef Heiß
  - Mike Heidt
  - Udo Kiessling
  - Rick Amann
  - Uli Hiemer
  - Mike Schmidt
  - Jörg Mayr
  - Ron Fischer
  - Michael Rumrich
  - Georg Holzmann
  - Jürgen Rumrich
  - Bernd Truntschka
  - Gerd Truntschka
  - Dieter Hegen
  - Ernst Köpf
  - Peter Draisaitl
  - Andreas Brockmann
  - Raimund Hilger
  - Thomas Brandl
  - Axel Kammerer
  - Andreas Niederberger
- Head Coaches: Ludĕk Bukač and Franz Reindl

== Luge ==
Men

Athlete	Run 1		Run 2		Run 3		Run 4		Total	
Athlete	Time	Rank	Time	Rank	Time	Rank	Time	Rank	Time	Rank
René Friedl	45.609	8	45.503	6	46.274	9	46.157	9	3:03.543	8
Jens Müller	45.435	4	45.598	8	46.028	2	46.136	8	3:03.197	5
Georg Hackl	45.190	1	45.351	3	46.026	1	45.796	1	3:02.363	1st place, gold medalist(s)

(Men's) Doubles

Athletes	Run 1		Run 2		Total	
Athletes	Time	Rank	Time	Rank	Time	Rank
Stefan Krauße; Jan Behrendt	46.060	1	45.993	1	1:32.053	1st place, gold medalist(s)
Yves Mankel; Thomas Rudolph	46.125	3	46.114	2	1:32.239	2nd place, silver medalist(s)

Women

Athlete	Run 1		Run 2		Run 3		Run 4		Total	
Athlete	Time	Rank	Time	Rank	Time	Rank	Time	Rank	Time	Rank
Gabi Kohlisch	47.206	11	47.072	7	46.911	5	46.791	4	3:07.980	6
Sylke Otto	47.089	7	47.460	19	47.394	16	47.056	11	3:08.999	13
Susi Erdmann	47.020	6	46.866	3	46.627	2	46.602	1	3:07.115	3rd place, bronze medalist(s)

== Nordic combined ==
Men's individual

Events:

- normal hill ski jumping (Best two out of three jumps.)
- 15 km cross-country skiing (Start delay, based on ski jumping results.)

Athlete	Event	Ski Jumping		Cross-country		Total
Athlete	Event	Points	Rank	Start at	Time	Rank
Sven Leonhardt	Individual	197.2	26	+3:28.7	52:28.6	35
Thomas Dufter	Individual	210.8	10	+1:58.0	47:52.9	12
Hans-Peter Pohl	Individual	212.5	8	+1:46.7	48:41.7	16

Men's Team

Three participants per team.

Events:

- normal hill ski jumping (Best two out of three jumps per team member were counted.)
- 10 km cross-country skiing (Start delay, based on ski jumping results.)

Athletes	Ski jumping		Cross-country		Total
Athletes	Points	Rank	Start at	Time	Rank
Hans-Peter Pohl; Jens Deimel; Thomas Dufter	609.7	3	2:57.0	1'28:21.9	5

== Ski jumping ==
Athlete	Event	Jump 1		Jump 2		Total	
Athlete	Event	Distance	Points	Distance	Points	Points	Rank
Jens Deimel	Normal hill	80.0	92.0	81.5	94.4	186.4	34
Dieter Thoma	Normal hill	79.5	93.2	82.0	96.2	189.4	27
Jens Weißflog	Normal hill	84.0	104.9	83.5	103.6	208.5	9
Heiko Hunger	Normal hill	87.0	108.7	84.0	102.9	211.6	7
Heiko Hunger	Large hill	72.0	-2.2	DNF	–	DNF	–
Jens Weißflog	Large hill	90.0	60.5	99.5	80.8	141.3	33
Dieter Thoma	Large hill	96.0	68.9	93.0	63.7	132.6	39
Christof Duffner	Large hill	112.0	98.3	100.0	78.0	176.3	11

Men's team large hill

Athletes	Result	
Athletes	Points ^{1}	Rank
Dieter Thoma; Heiko Hunger; Jens Weißflog; Christof Duffner	544.6	5

^{1} Four teams members performed two jumps each. The best three were counted.

== Speed skating ==
Men

Event	Athlete	Race	
Event	Athlete	Time	Rank
500 m	Olaf Zinke	38.40	25
500 m	Peter Adeberg	38.33	23
500 m	Uwe-Jens Mey	37.14	1st place, gold medalist(s)
1000 m	Peter Adeberg	1:15.04	5
1000 m	Olaf Zinke	1:14.85	1st place, gold medalist(s)
1500 m	Peter Adeberg	1:57.54	15
1500 m	Markus Tröger	1:57.42	13
1500 m	Olaf Zinke	1:56.74	6
5000 m	Rudi Jeklic	7:33.15	34
5000 m	Markus Tröger	7:17.62	15
5000 m	Frank Dittrich	7:06.33	4
10,000 m	Rudi Jeklic	14:51.89	23
10,000 m	Frank Dittrich	14:50.23	20
10,000 m	Markus Tröger	14:45.41	15

Women

Event	Athlete	Race	
Event	Athlete	Time	Rank
500 m	Anke Baier	41.30	10
500 m	Angela Hauck	41.10	8
500 m	Monique Garbrecht	40.63	4
500 m	Christa Luding-Rothenburger	40.57	3rd place, bronze medalist(s)
1000 m	Angela Hauck	1:24.11	14
1000 m	Anke Baier	1:23.31	9
1000 m	Christa Luding-Rothenburger	1:23.06	8
1000 m	Monique Garbrecht	1:22.10	3rd place, bronze medalist(s)
1500 m	Heike Warnicke	2:08.52	8
1500 m	Monique Garbrecht	2:07.24	5
1500 m	Gunda Niemann	2:05.92	2nd place, silver medalist(s)
1500 m	Jacqueline Börner	2:05.87	1st place, gold medalist(s)
3000 m	Jacqueline Börner	4:28.52	8
3000 m	Heike Warnicke	4:22.88	2nd place, silver medalist(s)
3000 m	Gunda Niemann	4:19.90	1st place, gold medalist(s)
5000 m	Claudia Pechstein	7:39.80	3rd place, bronze medalist(s)
5000 m	Heike Warnicke	7:37.59	2nd place, silver medalist(s)
5000 m	Gunda Niemann	7:31.57	1st place, gold medalist(s)
