= 1988 World Allround Speed Skating Championships =

International speed skating competition

1988 World Allround Speed Skating Championships for Men
- Venue: Medeo, Alma-Ata, Soviet Union
- Dates: 5–6 March
- Competitors: 40 skaters from 20 nations

Medalist men
1st place, gold medalist(s)		Eric Flaim	USA
2nd place, silver medalist(s)		Leo Visser	NED
3rd place, bronze medalist(s)		Dave Silk	USA

The World Allround Speed Skating Championships for Men took place on 5 and 6 March 1988 in Alma-Ata at the Medeo ice rink.

Title holder was Nikolay Gulyayev from the USSR.

== Classification ==
Rank	Skater	Country	Points Samalog	500m	5000m	1500m	10,000m
1st place, gold medalist(s)	Eric Flaim	United States	162.849	37.14 (2)	7:09.56 (14)	1:53.92 (2)	14:55.61 (4)
2nd place, silver medalist(s)	Leo Visser	Netherlands	163.751	38.69 (15)	7:08.53 (12)	1:57.37 (21)	14:21.70 (gold)
3rd place, bronze medalist(s)	Dave Silk	United States	163.926	37.96 (7)	6:58.69 (6)	1:53.66 (gold)	15:24.22* (11)
4	Michael Hadschieff	Austria	164.518	38.75 (18)	7:11.57 (16)	1:54.35 (4)	14:49.91 (2)
5	Jean Pichette	Canada	164.770	38.35 (13)	6:56.16 (3)	1:54.09 (3)	15:35.48 (15)
6	Roberto Sighel	Italy	164.771	38.64 (14)	6:55.60 (gold)	1:58.11 (27)	15:04.02 (8)
7	Oleg Bozhev	Soviet Union	164.819	37.74 (4)	7:18.70 (27)	1:54.73 (5)	14:59.33 (6)
8	Hans van Helden	France	165.385	39.74 (30)	7:01.67 (7)	1:56.62 (17)	14:52.11 (3)
9	Danny Kah	Australia	165.619	39.54 (29)	6:56.97 (4)	1:57.08 (19)	15:07.12 (9)
10	Christian Eminger	Austria	166.493	40.16 (33)	6:55.76 (2)	1:54.96 (7)	15:28.75 (14)
11	Toru Aoyanagi	Japan	166.660	37.22 (3)	7:16.24 (25)	1:54.76 (6)	15:51.26* (16)
12	Mark Greenwald	United States	166.966	39.75 (31)	6:57.07 (5)	1:57.48 (23)	15:26.99 (12)
13	Georg Herda	West Germany	167.094	38.74 (17)	7:04.53 (9)	1:58.56 (29)	15:27.63 (13)
14	Notker Ledergerber	Switzerland	167.771	40.45 (36)	7:03.11 (8)	2:00.53 (35)	14:56.68 (5)
15	Ari Leppänen	Finland	168.690	40.49 (37)	7:08.40 (11)	2:01.13 (36)	14:59.68 (7)
16	Atle Vårvik	Norway	170.991	41.73 (40)	7:08.00 (10)	2:01.41 (37)	15:19.82 (10)
NC17	Viktor Shasherin	Soviet Union	120.212	38.28 (8)	7:12.09 (18)	1:56.17 (13)	–
NC18	Annejan Portijk	Netherlands	120.280	38.31 (10)	7:13.34 (20)	1:55.91 (9)	–
NC19	BenoîtLamarche	Canada	120.289	38.69 (15)	7:09.33 (13)	1:56.00 (12)	–
NC20	Yoshiyuki Shimizu	Japan	120.316	38.31 (10)	7:12.13 (19)	1:56.38 (14)	–
NC21	Rolf Falk-Larssen	Norway	120.388	37.88 (6)	7:16.05 (23)	1:56.71 (18)	–
NC22	Peter Adeberg	East Germany	120.793	37.85 (5)	7:24.77 (34)	1:55.40 (8)	–
NC23	Munehisa Kuroiwa	Japan	120.954	38.31 (10)	7:15.11 (22)	1:57.40 (22)	–
NC24	Brian Wanek	United States	121.746	38.90 (20)	7:16.50 (26)	1:57.59 (25)	–
NC25	Ildar Garajev	Soviet Union	121.940	39.03 (22)	7:22.47 (31)	1:55.99 (10)	–
NC26	Roland Freier	East Germany	121.989	38.87 (19)	7:24.56* (33)	1:55.99 (10)	–
NC27	Joakim Karlberg	Sweden	122.055	39.08 (25)	7:18.99 (28)	1:57.23 (20)	–
NC28	Dmitri Joerkov	Soviet Union	122.083	39.05 (24)	7:22.10 (30)	1:56.47 (15)	–
NC29	Ben van der Burg	Netherlands	122.187	39.38 (27)	7:16.14 (24)	1:57.58 (24)	–
NC30	Johann Olav Koss	Norway	122.665	38.90 (20)	7:25.19 (35)	1:57.74 (26)	–
NC31	Toni Meiböck	Austria	122.817	39.08 (25)	7:22.81 (32)	1:58.37 (28)	–
NC32	Piotr Krysiak	Poland	123.222	40.33 (35)	7:09.89 (15)	1:59.71 (33)	–
NC33	Mikko Mäkinen	Finland	123.241	39.78 (32)	7:14.08 (21)	2:00.16 (34)	–
NC34	Frode Syvertsen	Norway	123.340	39.46 (28)	7:22.04 (29)	1:59.03 (30)	–
NC35	Kim Gwan-gyu	South Korea	123.541	39.03 (22)	7:26.91 (36)	1:59.46 (31)	–
NC36	Jiří Kyncl	Czechoslovakia	123.776	40.78 (38)	7:11.76 (17)	1:59.46 (31)	–
NC37	Gerard Kemkers	Netherlands	124.614	38.30 (9)	7:54.84* (38)	1:56.49 (16)	–
NC38	Khurelbator Radnaagin	Mongolia	126.991	40.18 (34)	7:35.88 (37)	2:03.67 (38)	–
NC39	István Dolp	Hungary	134.883	41.50 (39)	8:10.20 (39)	2:13.09 (39)	–
NC	Bae Ki-tae	South Korea	36.890	36.89 (gold)	DNS	–	–

* = Fell
DNS = Did not start

== Attribution ==
In Dutch
