= 1993 World Allround Speed Skating Championships =

International speed skating competition

1993 World Allround Speed Skating Championships for Men
- Venue: Vikingskipet, Hamar, Norway
- Dates: 13–14 February
- Competitors: 36 skaters from 22 nations

Medalist men
1st place, gold medalist(s)		Falko Zandstra	NED
2nd place, silver medalist(s)		Johann Olav Koss	NOR
3rd place, bronze medalist(s)		Rintje Ritsma	NED

The World Allround Speed Skating Championships for Men took place on 13 and 14 February 1993 in Hamar at the Vikingskipet ice rink.

Title holder was the Italian Roberto Sighel.

== Classification ==
Rank	Skater	Country	Points Samalog	500m	5000m	1500m	10,000m
1st place, gold medalist(s)	Falko Zandstra	Netherlands	157.626	38.00 (4)	6:43.86 (gold)	1:53.06 (2)	13:51.09 (3)
2nd place, silver medalist(s)	Johann Olav Koss	Norway	157.961	38.17 (6)	6:47.44 (2)	1:52.53 (gold)	13:50.75 (2)
3rd place, bronze medalist(s)	Rintje Ritsma	Netherlands	159.042	37.99 (3)	6:50.01 (4)	1:53.51 (3)	14:04.31 (4)
4	Bart Veldkamp	Netherlands	160.711	39.39 (18)	6:47.91 (3)	1:57.64 (9)	13:46.34 (gold)
5	Steinar Johansen	Norway	162.495	38.86 (10)	6:58.77 (8)	1:55.81 (4)	14:23.11 (9)
6	Roberto Sighel	Italy	162.515	38.13 (5)	7:00.21 (11)	1:56.76 (6)	14:28.88 (12)
7	Yuri Shulga	Ukraine	163.612	39.05 (11)	7:00.32 (12)	1:57.38 (7)	14:28.09 (11)
8	Yevgeny Sanarov	Kazakhstan	163.634	39.86 (23)	6:57.05 (5)	1:57.46 (8)	14:18.33 (5)
9	Desző Horváth	Romania	163.756	39.52 (20)	6:58.22 (7)	1:57.91 (14)	14:22.23 (7)
10	Kazuhiro Sato	Japan	163.934	39.94 (24)	6:57.67 (6)	1:57.67 (10)	14:20.08 (6)
11	Toshihiko Itokawa	Japan	166.131	40.12 (28)	7:01.51 (13)	2:01.64 (30)	14:26.29 (10)
12	Per Bengtsson	Sweden	166.171	41.03 (35)	7:00.07 (10)	2:00.06 (27)	14:22.29 (8)
NC13	Mamoru Ishioka	Japan	119.746	38.22 (7)	7:08.00 (23)	1:56.18 (5)	–
NC14	Brian Smith	United States	120.455	38.83 (9)	7:03.12 (17)	1:57.94 (16)	–
NC15	Neal Marshall	Canada	120.762	39.25 (16)	7:02.49 (15)	1:57.79 (12)	–
NC16	Brian Wanek	United States	121.135	39.26 (17)	7:03.15 (18)	1:58.68 (19)	–
NC17	Oleg Pavlov	Russia	121.267	39.07 (12)	7:07.74 (22)	1:58.27 (17)	–
NC18	Danny Kah	Australia	121.415	39.85 (22)	7:02.55 (16)	1:57.93 (15)	–
NC19	Davide Carta	Italy	121.811	38.26 (8)	7:20.21 (34)	1:58.59 (18)	–
NC20	Uwe Tonat	Germany	122.092	39.11 (15)	7:13.06 (28)	1:59.03 (21)	–
NC21	Jonas Schön	Sweden	122.099	39.95 (22)	7:04.39 (19)	1:59.13 (23)	–
NC22	Rickard Garbell	Sweden	122.404	39.09 (14)	7:14.98 (30)	1:59.45 (26)	–
NC23	Christian Eminger	Austria	122.734	40.56 (30)	7:05.58 (20)	1:58.85 (20)	–
NC24	Zsolt Zakarias	Austria	122.905	40.59 (32)	7:10.82 (24)	1:57.70 (11)	–
NC25	Lee Jae-sik	South Korea	122.994	39.07 (12)	7:18.41 (31)	2:00.25 (28)	–
NC26	Frank Dittrich	Germany	123.042	39.46 (19)	7:18.86 (33)	1:59.09 (22)	–
NC27	Timo Järvinen	Finland	123.365	40.50 (29)	7:11.55 (25)	1:59.13 (23)	–
NC28	Cédric Kuentz	France	123.746	40.56 (30)	7:14.13 (29)	1:59.32 (25)	–
NC29	Cam Mackay	Canada	123.848	40.06 (27)	7:12.48 (26)	2:01.62 (29)	–
NC30	Andrey Muratov	Russia	124.869	40.88 (34)	7:12.79 (27)	2:02.13 (31)	–
NC31	Martin Feigenwinter	Switzerland	125.052	41.38 (36)	7:07.29 (21)	2:02.83 (33)	–
NC32	Jiří Kyncl	Czech Republic	125.662	40.87 (33)	7:18.76 (32)	2:02.75 (32)	–
NC33	Markus Tröger	Germany	131.177	40.00 (26)	7:02.41 (14)	2:26.81* (34)	–
NC	Ådne Søndrål	Norway	–	37.92 (2)	6:58.86 (9)	DQ	–
NC	Song Chen	China	–	37.68 (gold)	8:01.05 (35)	DNS	–
NC	Artur Szafrański	Poland	–	39.74 (21)	DQ	1:57.89 (13)	–

* = Fell
DNS = Did not start
DQ = Disqualified

== Attribution ==
In Dutch
