= Speed skating at the 1988 Winter Olympics – Men's 1500 metres =

Speed skating at the Olympics

Men's 1500 metres at the XV Olympic Winter Games
- Pictogram for speed skating
- Venue: Olympic Oval
- Dates: 20 February 1988
- Competitors: 40 from 20 nations
- Winning time: 1:52.06 WR

Medalists
1st place, gold medalist(s)		André Hoffmann; East Germany
2nd place, silver medalist(s)		Eric Flaim; United States
3rd place, bronze medalist(s)		Michael Hadschieff; Austria

The men's 1500 metres in speed skating at the 1988 Winter Olympics took place on 20 February, at the Olympic Oval.

== Records ==
Prior to this competition, the existing world and Olympic records were as follows:

World record	Igor Zhelezovsky (URS)	1:52.50	Calgary, Canada	5 December 1987
Olympic record	Eric Heiden (USA)	1:55.44	Lake Placid, United States	21 February 1980

The following new World and Olympic records was set during the competition.

Date	Pair	Athlete	Country	Time	OR	WR
20 February	Pair 1	Eric Flaim	United States	1:52.12	OR	WR
20 February	Pair 3	André Hoffmann	East Germany	1:52.06	OR	WR

== Results ==
Rank	Pair	Lane	Athlete	Country	Time	Time behind	Notes
1st place, gold medalist(s)	3	o	André Hoffmann	East Germany	1:52.06	-	(WR)
2nd place, silver medalist(s)	1	o	Eric Flaim	United States	1:52.12	+0.06	
3rd place, bronze medalist(s)	4	o	Michael Hadschieff	Austria	1:52.31	+0.25	
4	6	i	Igor Zhelezovski	Soviet Union	1:52.63	+0.57	
5	2	i	Toru Aoyanagi	Japan	1:52.85	+0.79	
6	3	i	Aleksandr Klimov	Soviet Union	1:52.97	+0.91	
7	2	o	Nikolay Gulyayev	Soviet Union	1:53.04	+0.98	
8	8	o	Peter Adeberg	East Germany	1:53.57	+1.51	
9	15	i	Gaétan Boucher	Canada	1:54.18	+2.12	
10	5	i	Jean Pichett	Canada	1:54.63	+2.57	
11	14	o	Mark Greenwald	United States	1:54.64	+2.58	
12	16	i	Mike Richmond	Australia	1:54.95	+2.89	
13	11	i	Claes Bengtsson	Sweden	1:55.16	+3.10	
14	12	i	Danny Kah	Australia	1:55.19	+3.13	
15	10	i	Dave Silk	United States	1:55.26	+3.20	
16	6	o	Munehisa Kuroiwa	Japan	1:55.42	+3.36	
17	11	i	Im Ri-Bin	North Korea	1:55.55	+3.49	
18	16	o	Ben Lamarche	Canada	1:55.59	+3.53	
19	20	i	Hans van Helden	France	1:55.61	+3.55	
20	18	o	John Baskfield	United States	1:55.88	+3.82	
21	5	o	Rolf Falk-Larssen	Norway	1:55.94	+3.88	
22	20	o	Yoshiyuki Shimizu	Japan	1:55.98	+3.92	
23	14	i	Gregor Jelonek	Canada	1:56.37	+4.31	
24	13	o	Hans Magnusson	Sweden	1:56.44	+4.38	
25	8	i	Pertti Niittylä	Finland	1:56.48	+4.42	
26	4	i	Hwang Ik-hwan	South Korea	1:56.50	+4.44	
27	1	i	Hein Vergeer	Netherlands	1:56.63	+4.57	
28	19	o	Hozumi Moriyama	Japan	1:56.84	+4.78	
29	17	i	Kim Gwan-gyu	South Korea	1:56.85	+4.79	
30	9	i	Hansjörg Baltes	West Germany	1:57.08	+5.02	
31	10	o	Liu Yanfei	China	1:57.38	+5.32	
32	18	i	Phillip Tahmindjis	Australia	1:57.63	+5.57	
33	9	o	Frode Syvertsen	Norway	1:58.37	+6.31	
34	19	i	Jiří Kyncl	Czechoslovakia	1:58.44	+6.38	
35	7	i	Andrey Bobrov	Soviet Union	1:58.97	+6.91	
36	17	o	Jerzy Dominik	Poland	1:59.03	+6.97	
37	13	i	Julian Green	Great Britain	1:59.41	+7.35	
38	11	i	Craig McNicoll	Great Britain	2:01.89	+9.83	
39	15	o	Behudin Merdović	Yugoslavia	2:06.11	+14.05	
-	7	o	Joakim Karlberg	Sweden	DNF		
