= Maurizio Marchetto =

Italian speed skater

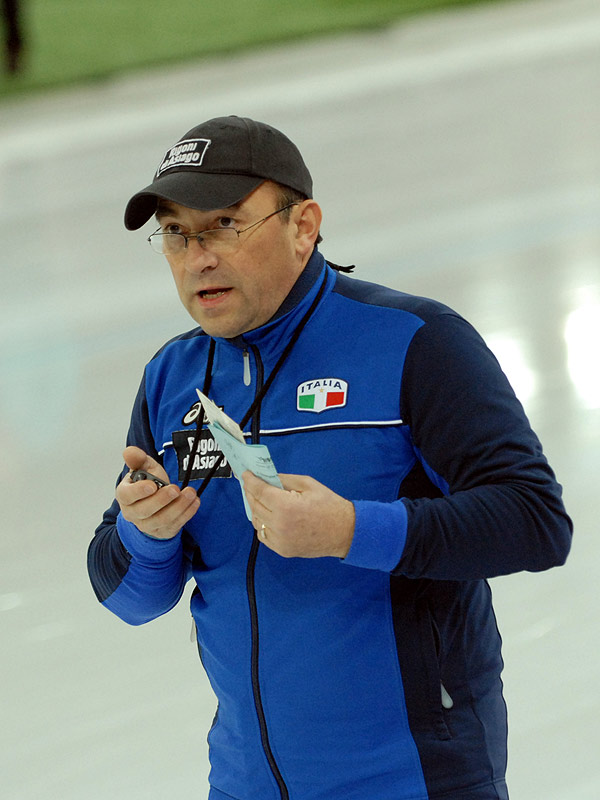
Maurizio Marchetto at the World Allround Championships in Hamar 2009.

Maurizio Marchetto (born 13 February 1956) is an Italian former ice speed skater, who represented his native country in three consecutive Winter Olympics, starting in 1976.

After his active career Marchetto has been coach for the Italian speed skating team, having success with skaters like Roberto Sighel (world champion 1992) and Enrico Fabris (olympic champion 2006). From 2009/2010, he has also coached Russian speed skater Ivan Skobrev and French speed skater Alexis Contin.
