= Falko Zandstra =

Dutch speed skater

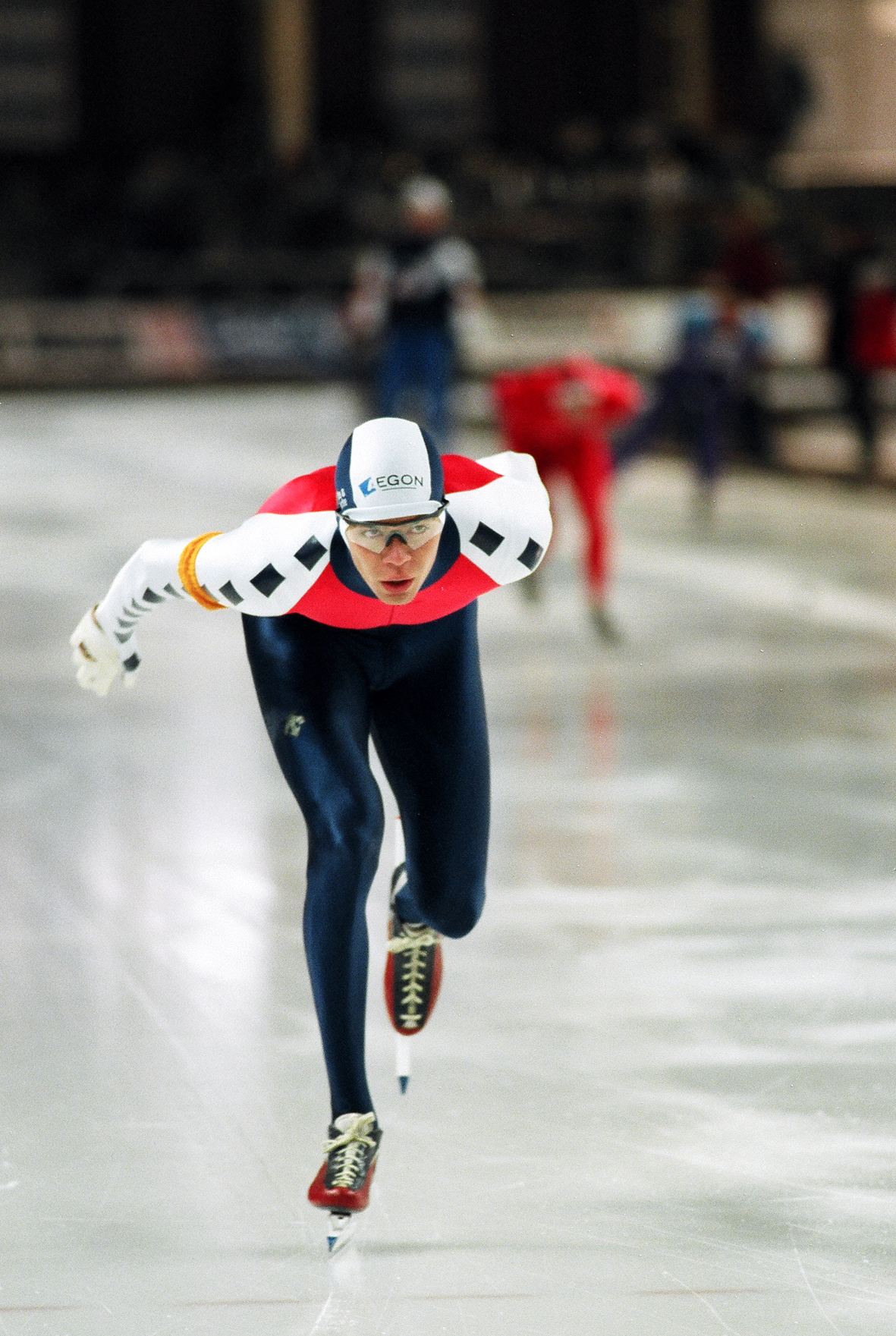
- Falko Zandstra

Personal information
- Nationality: Dutch
- Born: 27 December 1971 (age 54) Heerenveen, Netherlands
- Height: 1.89 m (6 ft 2 in)
- Weight: 76 kg (168 lb)

Sport
- Country: Netherlands
- Sport: Speed skating
- Turned pro: 1990
- Retired: 1998

Achievements and titles
- Personal best(s): 500 m: 37.89 (1994); 1000 m: 1:13.98 (1998); 1500 m: 1:50.90 (1997); 3000 m: 3:57.64 (1991); 5000 m: 6:39.57 (1998); 10 000 m: 13:46.96; 1993)
Medal record
Men's Speed Skating
Representing the Netherlands
Olympic Games
Silver medal – second place	1992 Albertville	5.000m
Bronze medal – third place	1994 Lillehammer	1.500m
World Allround Championships
Gold medal – first place	1993 Hamar	Allround
Silver medal – second place	1992 Calgary	Allround
European Championships
Gold medal – first place	1992 Heerenveen	Allround
Gold medal – first place	1993 Heerenveen	Allround
Silver medal – second place	1995 Heerenveen	Allround
Bronze medal – third place	1994 Hamar	Allround
Bronze medal – third place	1997 Heerenveen	Allround
World Junior Championships
Gold medal – first place	1990 Obihiro	Allround
Gold medal – first place	1991 Calgary	Allround

Falko Zandstra (born 27 December 1971) is a former Dutch speed skater. Because of his thin legs he was also called de Gespierde Spijker which translates to the Muscular Nail.

== Biography ==
Zandstra was born in Heerenveen, Friesland. He was a natural talent who had his career peak at a very young age. In 1990 and 1991 he became junior world champion. In 1991 he won with a world record in the small combination. In his international debut year 1992 he became European Champion Allround and finished second in the World Allround Championships, after Roberto Sighel. In that season he also won the World Cup at the 1500 meters and a silver medal at the Winter Olympics in the 5000 meters. A year later, in 1993 he became World champion and European champion again.

From 1994 on, his career went downwards. At the 1994 Winter Olympics in Lillehammer he won the bronze medal in the 1500 meters and finished fourth in the 5000 and 10000 meters. He also won the 1500 meters World Cup again. In 1995 he finished second in the European championships. At the World championships that year, he fell during the 1500 meters when he threw his arm band (which is used to indicate in which lane a skater has started) over his own skate. Because of this he didn't qualify for the 10,000 meters.

For 49 days, from 23 January until 13 March 1993, Falko Zandstra was the leader in the Adelskalender.

After his career, Zandstra switched to marathon skating with little success and he quit skating in 1999. Today he runs his own company in roof and wall plating called Falko Dak & Wand in Heerenveen. He is married to former Dutch speed skater Ellen Linnenbank.

== World records ==
In the course of his career, Zandstra skated nine world records, of which six were junior world records:

Event	Result	Date	Location
3000m junior	4:02.10	13 March 1990	Heerenveen
Small combination junior	159.753	17 February 1991	Heerenveen
Small combination	159.753	17 February 1991	Heerenveen
3000m junior	3:57.64	1 March 1991	Calgary
1500m junior	1.53,26	2 March 1991	Calgary
5000m junior	6:47.10	3 March 1991	Calgary
Small combination junior	156.059	3 March 1991	Calgary
Small combination	156.059	3 March 1991	Calgary
Big combination	156.882	23 January 1993	Heerenveen

Source: SpeedSkatingStats.com

=== Personal records ===
Personal records
Men's Speed skating
Event	Result	Date	Location	Notes
500m	37.89	7 January 1994	Hamar	
1000m	1:13.98	15 January 1998	Heerenveen	
1500m	1:50.90	20 December 1997	Heerenveen	
3000m	3:57.90	1 March 1991	Calgary	
5000m	6:39.57	18 December 1997	Heerenveen	
10000m	13:46.96	22 January 1993	Heerenveen	

Source: www.isu.org

== Tournament overview ==
Season	Dutch Championships Sprint	Dutch Championships Single Distances	Dutch Championships Allround	European Championships Allround	Olympic Games	World Championships Allround	World Championships Junior Allround
1988–89		HEERENVEEN 12th 1500m					
1989–90	ASSEN 11th 500m (gold) 1000m 8th 500m (silver) 1000m 5th overall	HEERENVEEN 8th 500m 4th 1000m 11th 1500m (silver) 5000m					OBIHIRO 7th 500m (gold) 3000m (silver) 1500m (gold) 5000m (gold) overall
1990–91			ALKMAAR 6th 500m 6th 5000m 11th 1500m 7th 10000m 5th overall				CALGARY (gold) 500m (gold) 3000m (gold) 1500m (gold) 5000m (gold) overall
1991–92		HEERENVEEN (gold) 1000m (bronze) 1500m 5th 5000m 4th 10000m	ALKMAAR (silver) 500m (silver) 5000m (gold) 1500m (silver) 10000m (gold) overall	HEERENVEEN 5th 500m 4th 5000m (gold) 1500m (bronze) 10000m (gold) overall	ALBERTVILLE 10th 1000m 7th 1500m (silver) 5000m	CALGARY 7th 500m (bronze) 5000m (gold) 1500m (gold) 10000m (silver) overall	
1992–93		DEVENTER NC 500m (silver) 1500m (silver) 5000m (gold) 10000m	ASSEN (silver) 500m (silver) 5000m (gold) 1500m (silver) 10000m (gold) overall	HEERENVEEN (gold) 500m (silver) 5000m (gold) 1500m (gold) 10000m (gold) overall		HAMAR ♦4th 500m (gold) 5000m (silver) 1500m (bronze) 10000m (gold) overall	
1993–94		HEERENVEEN 4th 1500m (silver) 5000m (gold) 10000m	THE HAGUE (silver) 500m 6th 5000m 5th 1500m 5th 10000m 4th overall	HAMAR 4th 500m (bronze) 5000m (silver) 1500m 5th 10000m (bronze) overall	LILLEHAMMER (bronze) 1500m 4th 5000m 4th 10000m		
1994–95		THE HAGUE (gold) 1500m (silver) 5000m (silver) 10000m	ASSEN (gold) 500m (silver) 5000m (gold) 1500m (silver) 10000m (gold) overall	HEERENVEEN 4th 500m (silver) 5000m (silver) 1500m (silver) 10000m (silver) overall		BASELGA di PINÈ 7th 500m 15th 5000m 35th 1500m DNQ 10000m NC overall(26th)	
1995–96			THE HAGUE 5th 500m 5th 5000m 5th 1500m 4th 10000m 4th overall				
1996–97			ASSEN 4th 500m (bronze) 5000m 4th 1500m (bronze) 10000m (silver) overall	HEERENVEEN 4th 500m 5th 5000m (bronze) 1500m 5th 10000m (bronze) overall		NAGANO 12th 500m 22nd 5000m 15th 1500m DNQ 10000m NC overall(14th)	
1997–98		HEERENVEEN 7th 1500m 5th 5000m (silver) 10000m	DEVENTER 24th 500m (gold) 5000m (silver) 1500m (silver) 10000m 11th overall	HELSINKI 5th 500m 9th 5000m 8th 1500m 8th 10000m 5th overall			

DNQ = Did not qualify for the final event
NC = No classification

== Medals won ==
Championship	Gold (gold)	Silver (silver)	Bronze (bronze)
Dutch Allround	3	1	0
European Allround	2	1	2
World Allround	1	1	0
World Junior Allround	2	0	0
Olympic Games	0	1	1

Awards
Preceded by (United States) Bonnie Blair	Oscar Mathisen Award; 1993	Succeeded by (Norway) Johann Olav Koss
Preceded by (Netherlands) Bart Veldkamp	Dutch Sportsman of the Year; 1993	Succeeded by (Netherlands) Regilio Tuur
Preceded by (Netherlands) Dries van Wijhe	Ard Schenk Award; 1992, 1993	Succeeded by (Netherlands) Rintje Ritsma
