= Ben van der Burg =

Dutch speed skater

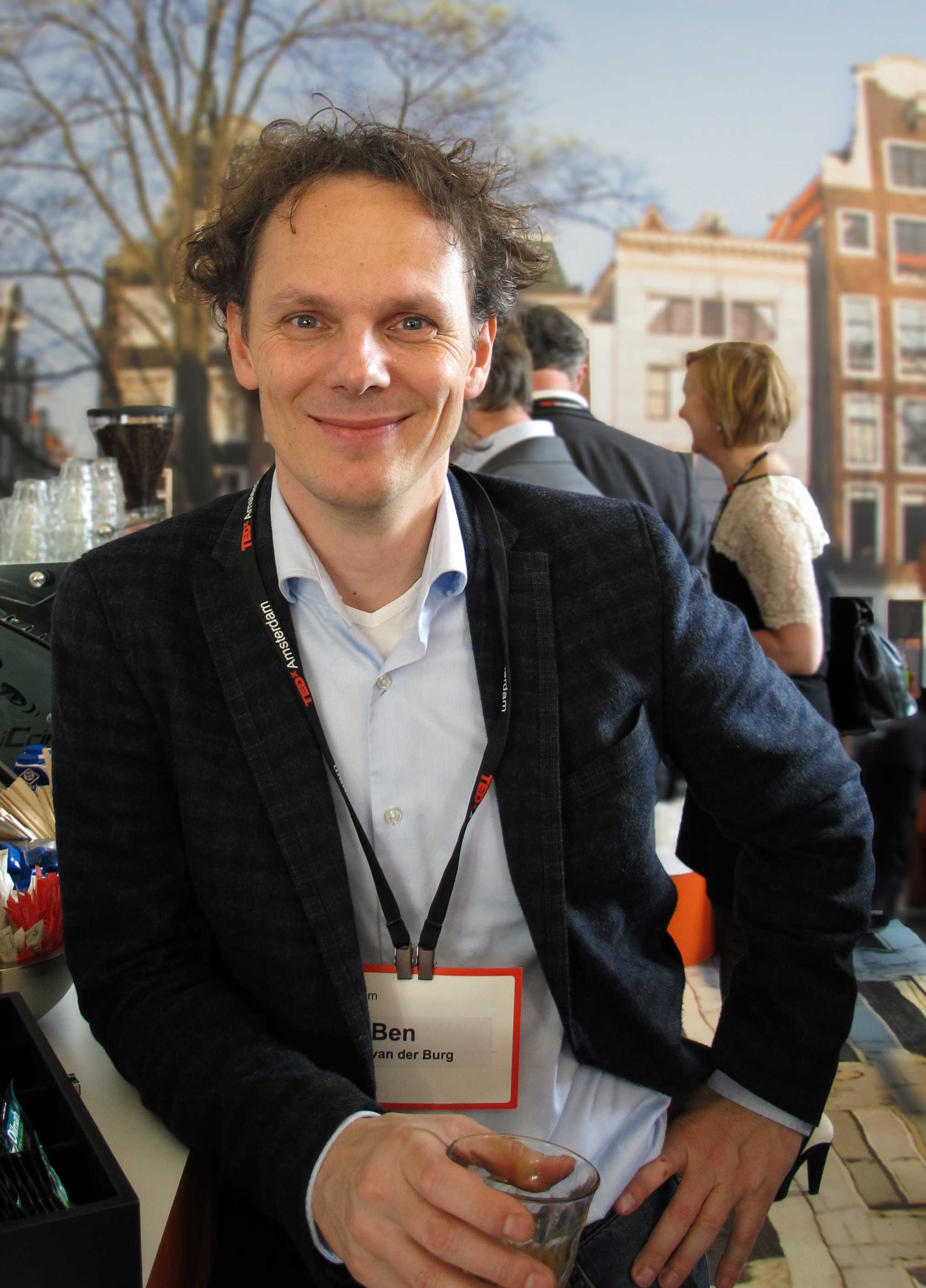
- Ben van der Burg in 2012

Personal information
- Born: 20 April 1968 (age 58) Schipluiden, the Netherlands

Sport
- Sport: Speed skating
Medal record
Representing the Netherlands
World Championships
| Silver medal – second place | 1990 Innsbruck | Allround |

Ben van der Burg (born 20 April 1968) is a retired speed skater from the Netherlands who was active between 1987 and 1992. He won a silver medal at the World All-Round Speed Skating Championships for Men in 1990. The same year he won three national titles, in the 1500 and 5000 m and allround.

== Personal records ==
Personal records
Men's speed skating
| Event | Result | Date | Location | Notes |
| 500 meter | 38.40 | 19 January 1990 | Heerenveen | |
| 1000 meter | 1:16.14 | 10 February 1990 | Collalbo | |
| 1500 meter | 1:54.00 | 20 January 1990 | Heerenveen | |
| 3000 meter | 3:58.00 | 13 March 1990 | Heerenveen | |
| 5000 meter | 6:45.48 | 2 December 1990 | Heerenveen | |
| 10000 meter | 14:22.00 | 12 December 1990 | Calgary | |

Van der Burg has a score of 160.048 points on the Adelskalender

== Tournament overview ==
| Season | Dutch Championships Single Distances | Dutch Championships Allround | European Championships Allround | World Cup | World Championships Allround | World Championships Allround Juniors |
|---|---|---|---|---|---|---|
| 1985–86 | | | | | | SAINTE–FOY 18th 500m 6th 3000m 26th** 1500m 10th 5000m 16th overall |
| 1986–87 | THE HAGUE 16th 1500m 8th 5000m 21st 10000m | DEVENTER 12th 500m 9th 5000m 10th 1500m 12th 10000m 10th overall | | | | |
| 1987–88 | HEERENVEEN 16th 500m 15th 1000m 7th 1500m 5th 5000m 11th 10000m | ALKMAAR 4th 500m 7th 5000m 10th 1500m (bronze) 10000m 4th overall | | | ALMA–ATA 27th 500m 24th 5000m 24th 1500m DNQ 10000m NC overall | |
| 1988–89 | HEERENVEEN 19th 500m 8th 1500m 6th 5000m 6th 10000m | THE HAGUE 5th 500m 13th 5000m 9th 1500m 8th 10000m 6th overall | | 18th 1500m 12th 5000/10000m | | |
| 1989–90 | HEERENVEEN 13th 500m (gold) 1500m (gold) 5000m 6th 10000m | ASSEN (silver) 500m (silver) 5000m (gold) 1500m (bronze) 10000m (gold) overall | HEERENVEEN 8th 500m 5th 5000m (gold) 1500m 9th 10000m 5th overall | (silver) 1500m 4th 5000/10000m | INNSBRUCK 7th 500m (bronze) 5000m (gold) 1500m 5th 10000m (silver) overall | |
| 1990–91 | | ALKMAAR (bronze) 500m 4th 5000m (silver) 1500m 5th 10000m (bronze) overall | SARAJEVO 4th 500m 7th 5000m 10th 1500m 6th 10000m 4th overall | 6th 1500m 8th 5000/10000m | HEERENVEEN 7th 500m 18th 5000m 14th 1500m DNQ 10000m NC overall | |
| 1991–92 | HEERENVEEN 6th 1500m | | | 17th 1500m 23rd 5000/10000m | | |

- DNQ = Did not qualify for the final distance
- NC = No classification
- ** = Fell but finished

== Medals won ==
| Championship | Gold (gold) | Silver (silver) | Bronze (bronze) |
|---|---|---|---|
| Dutch Championships Single Distances | 2 | 0 | 0 |
| Dutch Championships Allround | 2 | 3 | 4 |
| European Championships Allround | 1 | 0 | 0 |
| World Cup | 0 | 1 | 0 |
| World Allround | 1 | 1 | 1 |
| World Allround Juniors | 0 | 0 | 0 |
