= Andrey Bobrov =

Soviet speed skater (born 1964)

Personal information
- Nationality: Soviet
- Born: 13 June 1964 (age 61) Omsk, Russian SFSR, Soviet Union

Sport
- Sport: Speed skating

Andrey Bobrov (born 13 June 1964) is a Soviet speed skater. He competed in the men's 1500 metres event at the 1988 Winter Olympics.
