= John Baskfield =

American speed skater

Personal information
- Born: June 29, 1965 (age 61) Saint Paul, Minnesota, United States

Sport
- Sport: Speed skating

John Baskfield (born June 29, 1965) is an American speed skater. He competed in the men's 1500 metres event at the 1988 Winter Olympics.
