= Gregor Jelonek =

Canadian speed skater

Personal information
- Born: 16 September 1968 (age 56); Montreal, Quebec, Canada

Sport
- Sport: Speed skating

Gregor Jelonek (born 16 September 1968) is a Canadian speed skater. He competed in the men's 1500 metres event at the 1988 Winter Olympics. He went to the Olympics as a coach five times: Turin, Vancouver, Sotchi, PyeongChang and Pekin. His athlete, Laurent Dubreuil won the silver medal at the 2022 Olympics in the 1000m.
