= Yvonne Seifert =

German freestyle skier (born 1964)

Personal information
- Nationality: German
- Born: 27 July 1964 (age 61) Munich, West Germany

Sport
- Sport: Freestyle skiing

Yvonne Seifert (born 27 July 1964) is a German freestyle skier. She competed in the women's moguls event at the 1992 Winter Olympics.
