= Jens Deimel =

Nordic combined skier (born 1972)

Medal record

Men's Nordic combined

World Championships
Bronze medal – third place	1993 Falun	3 x 10 km team

Jens Deimel (born 14 September 1972 in Winterberg, North Rhine-Westphalia) is a former German Nordic combined skier who competed from 1992 to 2002. He won a bronze medal in the 3 x 10 km team event at the 1993 FIS Nordic World Ski Championships in Falun and had his best individual finish of 15th twice at the championships (1999 – 15 km individual, 2001 - 7.5 km sprint).

Competing at the 1998 Winter Olympics in Nagano, he finished sixth in the 4 x 5 km team event.

Deimel's best individual career finish was 3rd on three occasions (1992, 1993, 1994).

He later became an assistant coach on the German national ski jumping team under the direction of head coach Werner Schuster.
