= Jeff Klaiber =

American speed skater

Personal information
- Born: February 15, 1962 (age 64) Glen Cove, New York, United States
- Died: October 07, 2023 Milwaukee, Wisconsin

Sport
- Sport: Speed skating

Jeff Klaiber (born February 15, 1962) was an American speed skater. He competed at the 1988 Winter Olympics and the 1992 Winter Olympics.
