= Piotr Krysiak =

Polish investigative journalist and writer

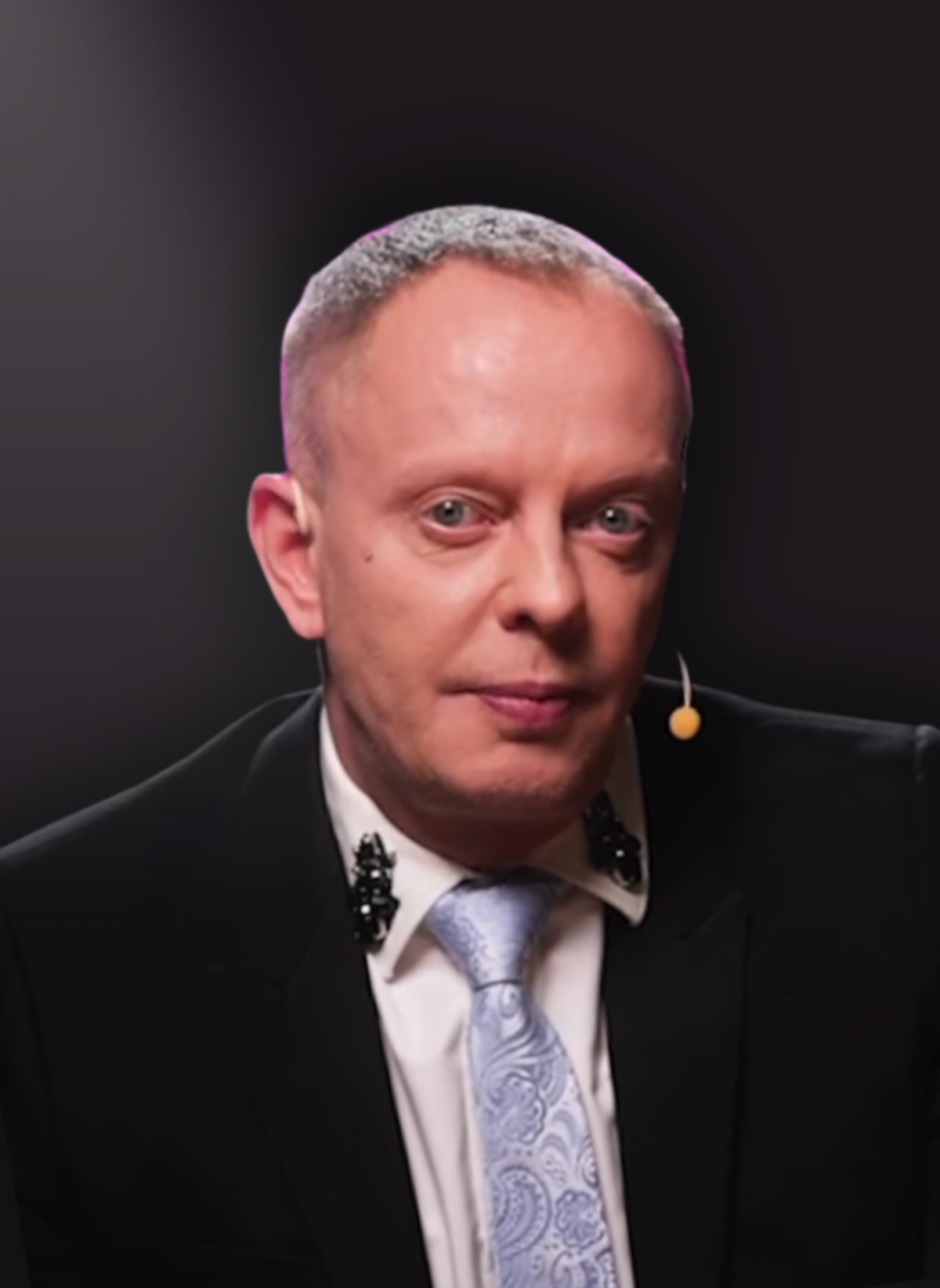
- Born: September 6, 1976 (age 50)

Piotr Tomasz Krysiak (born September 6, 1976) is a Polish investigative journalist and writer.

He works for the Polish weekly news magazine Wprost, TVP, and Deadline publishing house. He is also author of reportage books and creator of the program Bez Maski (Without Mask) on YouTube.

== Controversy ==
Piotr Krysiak is the author of controversial publications about people from the Polish show business. His work has often caused negative reactions. Edyta Górniak sued him for his unauthorized biography Edyta Górniak: Uncensored. The singer claimed that the content of the book is untrue and violates her personal rights. In 2009, the District Court in Warsaw banned the distribution of the publication and ordered the defendant to issue an apology and pay money to a charitable foundation. The Court of Appeal ruled that the sentence is legally binding.

Krysiak was also sued by Omenaa Mensah for violating her personal rights in connection with the publication of The Girl from Dubai. She demanded to block the sale of the book. In November 2023 the District Court in Warsaw imposed a ban on him from speaking about the presenter.

As reported by the Salon 24 website, Piotr Krysiak is hounded by bailiffs.

== Books ==
- 2005: Edyta Górniak. Uncensored
- 2010: Agent Tomek: Confession
- 2011: Children of the World (with Monika Witkowska)
- 2017: Blind Island
- 2018: Girls from Dubai
- 2018: Dealer of Stars
- 2021: Boys from Dubai
- 2023: Girls from Dubai 2
