= Rick Amann =

German ice hockey player

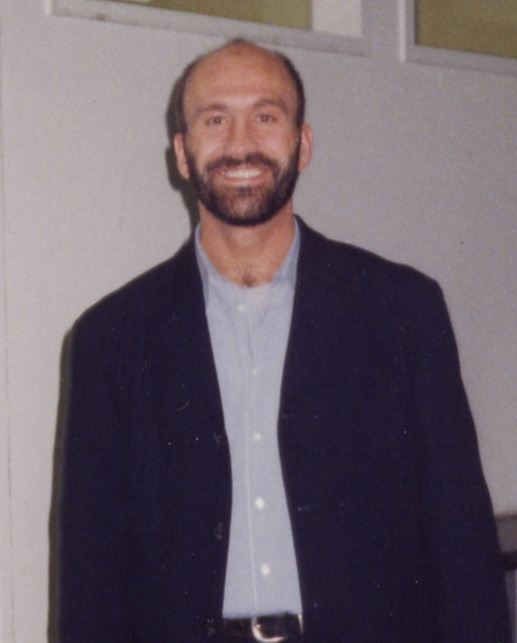
- Amann in 1997

Personal information
- Nationality: German
- Born: 30 December 1960 (age 65) MacGregor, Manitoba, Canada

Sport
- Sport: Ice hockey

Rick Amann (born 30 December 1960) is a German ice hockey player. He competed in the men's tournaments at the 1992 Winter Olympics and the 1994 Winter Olympics.
