= Timo Järvinen =

Finnish speed skater (born 1966)

Personal information
- Nationality: Finnish
- Born: 18 November 1966 (age 59) Helsinki, Finland

Sport
- Sport: Speed skating

Timo Järvinen (born 18 November 1966) is a Finnish speed skater. He competed at the 1988 Winter Olympics and the 1992 Winter Olympics.
