= Phillip Tahmindjis =

Australian speed skater

Phillip Tahmindjis (born 7 February 1968 in Kensington, New South Wales) is a former ice speed skater from Australia, who represented his native country in three consecutive Winter Olympics, starting in 1988 in Calgary, Canada.

Tahmindjis also competed in natural ice races during his time in Europe and is a life-long cyclist.

== Achievements ==
- World Allround Speed Skating Championships for Men (3 participations):
  - 1990, 1991, 1992
    - Best result 28th in 1992
- World Sprint Speed Skating Championships for Men (4 participations):
  - 1987, 1989, 1993, 1994
    - Best result 28th in both 1989 and 1993
- World Junior Speed Skating Championships (2 participations):
  - 1985, 1986
    - Best result 12th in 1986

== Personal records ==
Personal records
Men's Speed skating
Event	Result	Date	Location	Notes
500 m	38.67	1993-03-20	Calgary	
1,000 m	1:14.97	1993-11-20	Calgary	
1,500 m	1:55.65	1993-03-20	Calgary	
5,000 m	6:57.91	1990-12-29	Calgary	
10,00 m	14:58.00	1990-12-29	Calgary	
