= Rudi Jeklic =

German speed skater

Personal information
- Nationality: German
- Born: 5 November 1965 (age 59); Inzell, West Germany

Sport
- Sport: Speed skating

Rudi Jeklic (born 5 November 1965) is a German former speed skater. He competed in two events at the 1992 Winter Olympics.
