= Roberto Sighel =

Italian speed skater

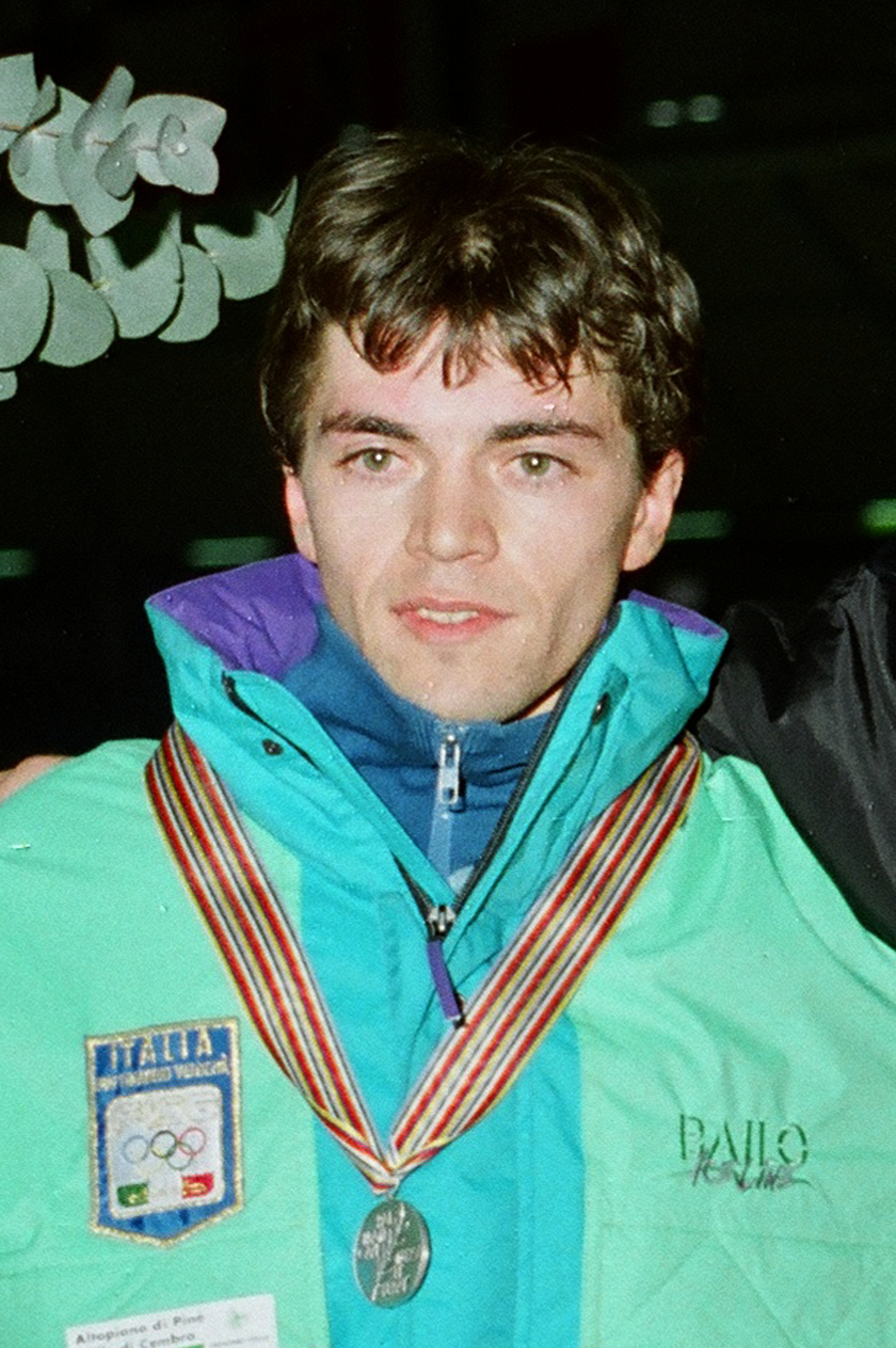
- Roberto Sighel

Personal information
- Nationality: Italian
- Born: 17 February 1967 (age 59) Baselga di Pinè, Italy
- Height: 1.68 m (5 ft 6 in)
- Weight: 66 kg (146 lb)

Sport
- Country: Italy
- Sport: Speed skating
- Turned pro: 1984
- Coached by: Maurizio Marchetto
- Retired: 2004

Achievements and titles
- Personal best(s): 500 m: 36.93 (2002); 1000 m: 1:12.92 (1999); 1500 m: 1:47.47 (1998); 3000 m: 3:46.80 (1999); 5000 m: 6:25.11 (2002); 10 000 m: 13:26.19 (2002)
Medal record
Men's speed skating
Representing Italy
World Championships
Gold medal – first place	1992	Allround
Silver medal – second place	1991	Allround
Bronze medal – third place	1995	Allround
Bronze medal – third place	1998	Allround
World Single Distances Championships
Bronze medal – third place	1998	1500 m
European Championships
Silver medal – second place	1998	Allround
Silver medal – second place	1999	Allround
Bronze medal – third place	1995	Allround

Roberto Sighel (born 17 February 1967) is an Italian former speedskater, with particularly strong achievements in the allround samalogue competitions.

Sighel was born in Trento. His skating career was unusually long, competing at top international level from 1988 to 2002. He participated in each of the 1988, 1992, 1994, 1998, 2002 Olympics, with 7th place his best result (10,000-m 1988, 5000-m 2002).

Sighel won the 1992 World Allround Championships, where he set a world record with 157.150 (37.38, 6:43,91, 1:52,38, 13:58,39). He also held the world record for one hour skating, with 41.041 km (25.502 mi), skated in Calgary 24 March 1999; this record lasted until Henk Angenent skated 41.669 km (25.892 mi) on 12 March 2004, also in Calgary.

In the World Allround Championships series, his results were 23 (1987), 6 (1988), 15 (1989), 2 (1991), 1 (1992), 6 (1993), 13 (1994), 3 (1995), 13 (1996), 22 (1997), 3 (1998), 4 (1999), 19 (2001), 7 (2002).

His son Pietro Sighel and daughter Arianna Sighel are both members of Italy's national short track speed skating team.

== Adelskalender ==
Very few skaters manage to stay within the top ten of the Adelskalender over several seasons. Sighel is among those few, as he was

- no. 14 after the 1989 season,
- no. 15 after 1990,
- no. 9 after 1991,
- no. 2 after 1992,
- no. 3 after 1993,
- no. 4 after 1994,
- no. 4 after 1995,
- no. 5 after 1996,
- no. 7 after 1997,
- no. 3 after 1998,
- no. 3 after 1999,
- no. 5 after 2000,
- no. 13 after 2001,
- and no. 10 at career finish at 2002.

== Records ==
=== Personal records ===
Personal records
Men's Speed skating
Event	Result	Date	Location	Notes
500 m	36.93	15 March 2002	Heerenveen	
1000 m	1:12.92	26 January 1999	Collalbo	
1500 m	1:47.47	29 March 1998	Calgary	
3000 m	3:46.80	19 March 1999	Calgary	
5000 m	6:25.11	9 February 2002	Salt Lake City	
10000 m	13:26.19	22 February 2002	Salt Lake City	

Source: SpeedskatingResults.com

=== World record ===
Event	Time	Date	Venue
Big combination	157.150	22 March 1992	Calgary

Source: SpeedSkatingStats.com
