= Markus Tröger =

German speed skater

Personal information
- Nationality: German
- Born: 16 April 1966 (age 58); Nuremberg, West Germany

Sport
- Sport: Speed skating

Markus Tröger (born 16 April 1966) is a German speed skater. He competed in three events at the 1992 Winter Olympics.
