= Peter Adeberg =

German speed skater

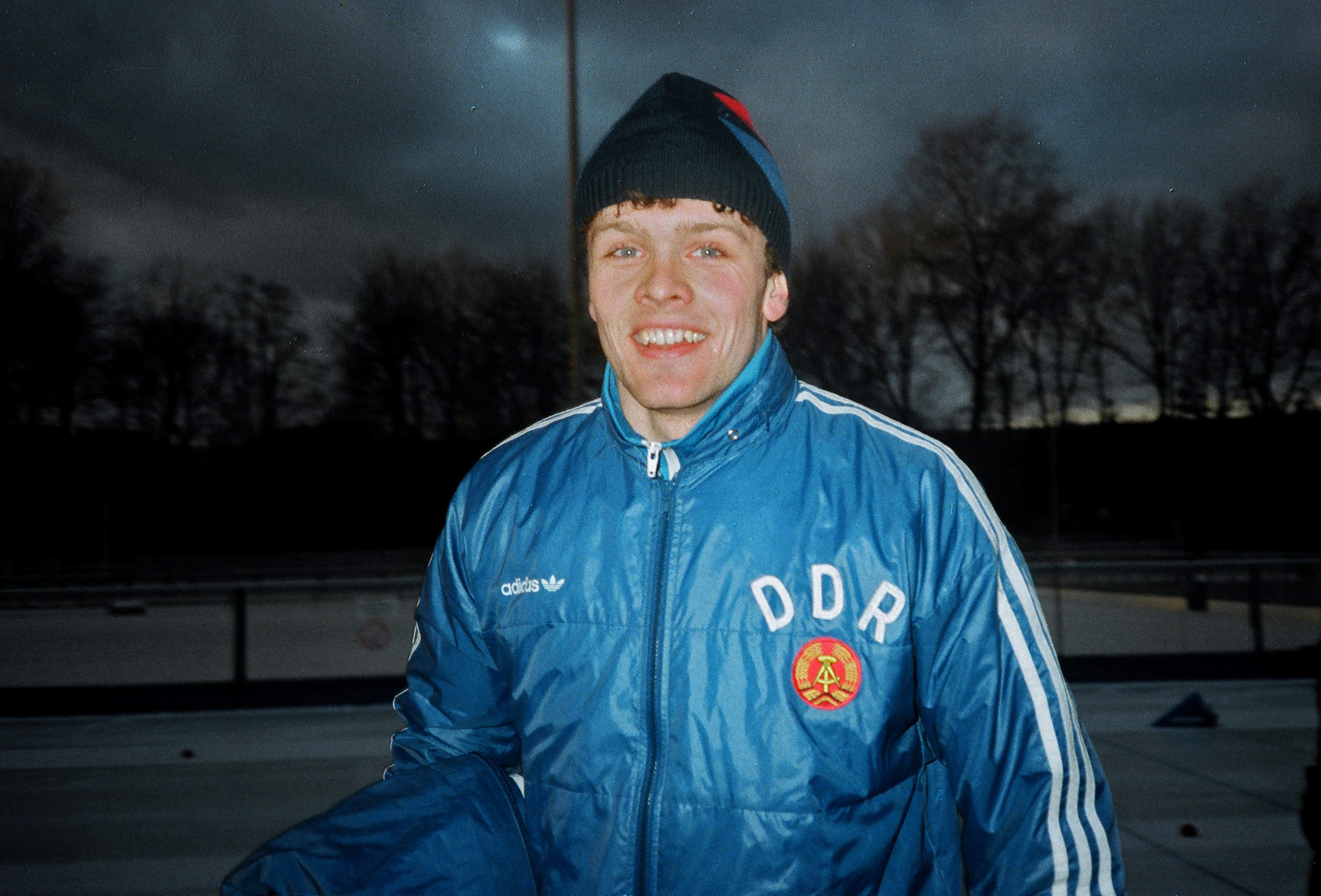
- Peter Adeberg in 1998

Personal information
- Nationality: East German; German
- Born: 23 May 1968 (age 56); Merseburg, East Germany
- Height: 1.85 m (6 ft 1 in)
- Weight: 75 kg (165 lb)

Sport
- Sport: Speed skating

Peter Adeberg (born 23 May 1968) is a German speed skater who also represented East Germany. He competed in the 1988, 1992, 1994, and 1998 Winter Olympics.
