= Jiří Kyncl =

Czech speed skater (1962–2022)

Personal information
- Nationality: Czech
- Born: 3 November 1962; Polička, Czechoslovakia
- Died: 31 January 2022 (aged 59)

Sport
- Sport: Speed skating

Jiří Kyncl (3 November 1962 – 31 January 2022) was a Czech speed skater. He competed at the 1988 Winter Olympics and the 1992 Winter Olympics. He died on 31 January 2022, at the age of 59.
