= Danny Kah =

Australian speed skater

Danny Kah (born 5 May 1967 in Two Wells, South Australia) is a former ice speed skater from Australia, who represented his native country in three consecutive Winter Olympics, starting in 1988 in Calgary, Canada.

Kah retired from speedskating in 1994 but still holds the national records on the 5,000 and 10,000 meters. By 11 January 2009, Kah was placed 463rd on the Adelskalender, the ranking list of all-time personal bests.

== Achievements ==
- World Allround Speed Skating Championships for Men (8 participations):
  - 1986, 1987, 1988, 1989, 1990, 1991, 1992, 1993
    - Best result 7th in 1991
- World Sprint Speed Skating Championships for Men (1 participation):
  - 1991
    - Best result 26th in 1991
- World Junior Speed Skating Championships (1 participation):
  - 1985
    - 18th in 1985

== Personal records ==
Personal records
Men's Speed skating
| Event | Result | Date | Location | Notes |
| 500 m | 38.95 | 1991-02-09 | Heerenveen | |
| 1,000 m | 1:16.30 | 1991-02-20 | Baselga di Pinè | |
| 1,500 m | 1:55.18 | 1990-12-08 | Calgary | |
| 5,000 m | 6:52.14 | 1988-02-17 | Calgary | Australian national record |
| 10,000 m | 14:17.70 | 1991-02-10 | Heerenveen | Australian national record |
